= List of songs recorded by the Doobie Brothers =

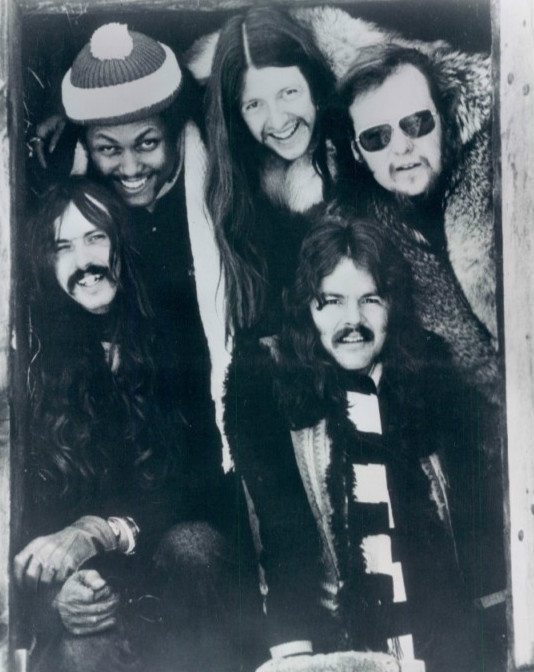
The Doobie Brothers in a 1974 promotional photo.

This is a list of songs recorded by the American rock band the Doobie Brothers.

This list excludes live performances, alternate takes, alternate mixes and remixes.

== List of songs ==
Key
| # | Indicates song not written or co-written by the Doobie Brothers |
| † | Indicates song released as a single |
| ‡ | Indicates reissues, compilations, and box sets |

Name of song, writer(s), original release, and year of release
| Song | Writer(s) | Original release | Year | Ref. |
|---|---|---|---|---|
| "45th Floor" | Bill Champlin; Tom Johnston | Sibling Rivalry | 2000 | |
| "8th Avenue Shuffle" | Patrick Simmons | Takin' It to the Streets | 1976 | |
| "A Brighter Day" | Johnston | World Gone Crazy | 2010 | |
| "Amen Old Friend" | Johnston; John Shanks | Liberté | 2021 | |
| "The American Dream" | Johnstone; Shanks | Liberté | 2021 | |
| "Angels & Mercy" † | Simmons; Shanks | Walk This Road | 2025 | |
| "Angels of Madness" | Guy Allison; Michael Hossack; John McFee | Sibling Rivalry | 2000 | |
| "Another Park, Another Sunday" † | Johnston | What Were Once Vices Are Now Habits | 1974 | |
| "Beehive State" † | Randy Newman # | The Doobie Brothers | 1971 | |
| "Better Days" | Simmons; Shanks | Liberté | 2021 | |
| "Black Water" † | Simmons | What Were Once Vices Are Now Habits | 1974 | |
| "Busted Down Around O'Connelly Cornerss" | James Earl Luft # | The Captain and Me | 1973 | |
| "Call Me" † | Johnston; Shanks | Walk This Road | 2025 | |
| "Cannonball" | Simmons; Shanks | Liberté | 2021 | |
| "Can't Let It Get Away" † | McFee; Nicolette Larson; Simmons | Japan only single | 1981 | |
| "Can't Stand to Lose" | John Cowan; Rusty Young # | Sibling Rivalry | 2000 | |
| "The Captain and Me" | Johnston | The Captain and Me | 1973 | |
| "Carry Me Away" | Simmons; Baxter; Michael McDonald | Takin' It to the Streets | 1976 | |
| "Chateau" | Simmons; Ted Templeman | World Gone Crazy | 2010 | |
| "Chicago" | Traditional # | The Doobie Brothers | 1971 | |
| "China Grove" † | Johnston | The Captain and Me | 1973 | |
| "Chinatown" | Simmons | Livin' on the Fault Line | 1977 | |
| "Clear as the Driven Snow" | Simmons | The Captain and Me | 1973 | |
| "Closer Every Day" | Simmons | The Doobie Brothers | 1971 | |
| "Cotton Mouth" | Seals & Crofts # | Toulouse Street | 1972 | |
| "Dangerous" † | Simmons | Brotherhood | 1991 | |
| "Dark-Eyed Cajun Woman" | Johnston | The Captain and Me | 1973 | |
| "Daughters of the Sea" | Simmons | Toulouse Street | 1972 | |
| "Dedicate This Heart" | McDonald; Paul Anka | One Step Closer | 1980 | |
| "Dependin' on You" † | McDonald; Simmons | Minute by Minute | 1978 | |
| "Disciple" | Johnston | Toulouse Street | 1972 | |
| "Divided Highway" | Simmons; Jimi Fox; Jim Peterik | Brotherhood | 1991 | |
| "The Doctor" † | Johnston; Charlie Midnight; Eddie Schwartz | Cycles | 1989 | |
| "Don't Be Afraid" | Simmons; Cris Sommer-Simmons; Bob Bangerter | Sibling Rivalry | 2000 | |
| "Don't Say Goodbye" | Simmons, Templeman | World Gone Crazy | 2010 | |
| "Don't Start Me to Talkin'" | Sonny Boy Williamson II # | Toulouse Street | 1972 | |
| "Don't Stop to Watch the Wheels" | Simmons; Baxter; Michael Ebert | Minute by Minute | 1978 | |
| "Don't Ya Mess with Me" | Johnston; Shanks | Liberté | 2021 | |
| "Double Dealin' Four Flusher" | Simmons | Stampede | 1976 | |
| "Down in the Track" | Johnston | What Were Once Vices Are Now Habits | 1974 | |
| "Easy" † | Johnston; Shanks | Liberté | 2021 | |
| "Echoes of Love" † | Simmons; Willie Mitchell; Earl Randle | Livin' on the Fault Line | 1977 | |
| "Evil Woman" | Simmons | The Captain and Me | 1973 | |
| "Excited" | Johnston; Jerry Lynn Williams | Brotherhood | 1991 | |
| "Eyes of Silver" † | Johnston | What Were Once Vices Are Now Habits | 1974 | |
| "Far from Home" | Simmons; Templeman | World Gone Crazy | 2010 | |
| "Feelin Down Father" † | Johnston | The Doobie Brothers | 1971 | |
| "Five Corners" | MeFee; Simmons | Sibling Rivalry | 2000 | |
| "Flying Cloud" | Tiran Porter | What Were Once Vices Are Now Habits | 1974 | |
| "For Someone Special" | Porter | Takin' It to the Streets | 1976 | |
| "Gates of Eden" | Allison; Keith Knudsen # | Sibling Rivalry | 2000 | |
| "Good Thang" | Simmons; Shanks | Liberté | 2021 | |
| "Greenwood Creek" | Johnston | The Doobie Brothers | 1971 | |
| "Growin' a Little Each Day" | Johnston | The Doobie Brothers | 1971 | |
| "Here to Love You" | McDonald | Minute by Minute | 1978 | |
| "Here to Stay" | Johnston; Shank | Walk This Road | 2025 | |
| "Higher Ground" | Champlin; Tamara Champlin; Johnston | Sibling Rivalry | 2000 | |
| "How Do the Fools Survive?" | McDonald; Carole Bayer Sager | Minute by Minute | 1978 | |
| "I Been Workin' on You" | Johnston | Stampede | 1976 | |
| "I Can Read Your Mind" | Bobby LaKind; McDonald | Cycles | 1989 | |
| "I Cheat the Hangman" † | Simmons | Stampede | 1976 | |
| "I Know We Won" | Willie Nelson; Simmons | World Gone Crazy | 2010 | |
| "Is Love Enough" | Lynn Williams; Walt Richmond # | Brotherhood | 1991 | |
| "It Keeps You Runnin'" † | McDonald | Takin' It to the Streets | 1976 | |
| "It Won't Be Right" | Johnston; Simmons | The Doobie Brothers | 1971 | |
| "Jericho" | Johnston | Sibling Rivalry | 2000 | |
| "Jesus Is Just Alright" (The Art Reynolds Singers cover) † | Arthur Reid Reynolds # | Toulouse Street | 1972 | |
| "Just Can’t Do This Alone" | Johnston; Shanks | Liberté | 2021 | |
| "Just in Time" | Simmons | One Step Closer | 1980 | |
| "Keep This Train A-Rollin" † | McDonald | One Step Closer | 1980 | |
| "The Kind That Lasts | McDonald; Shanks | Walk This Road | 2025 | |
| "Lahaina" † | McDonald; Simmons; Shanks | Walk This Road | 2025 | |
| "Larry the Logger Two-Step" | Simmons | Livin' on the Fault Line | 1977 | |
| "Learn to Let Go" | McDonald; Shanks | Walk This Road | 2025 | |
| "Leave My Heartache Behind" | Simmons | Sibling Rivalry | 2000 | |
| "Listen to the Music" † | Johnston | Toulouse Street | 1972 | |
| "Little Bitty Pretty One" (Thurston Harris and the Sharps cover) | Bobby Day # | Long Train Runnin': 1970–2000 ‡ | 1999 | |
| "Little Darling (I Need You)" (Marvin Gaye cover) † | Holland-Dozier-Holland # | Livin' on the Fault Line | 1977 | |
| "Little Prayer" | Simmons | World Gone Crazy (bonus track on some editions) | 2010 | |
| "Livin' on the Fault Line" | Simmons | Livin' on the Fault Line | 1977 | |
| "Long Train Runnin'" † | Johnston | The Captain and Me | 1973 | |
| "Losin' End" | McDonald | Takin' It to the Streets | 1976 | |
| "Mamaloi" | Simmons | Toulouse Street | 1972 | |
| "The Master" | Johnston | The Doobie Brothers | 1971 | |
| "Minute by Minute" † | McDonald; Lester Abrams | Minute by Minute | 1978 | |
| "Music Man" | Johnston | Stampede | 1976 | |
| "My Baby" | Johnston | World Gone Crazy | 2010 | |
| "Natural Thing" | Johnston | The Captain and Me | 1973 | |
| "Neal's Fandango" | Simmons | Stampede | 1976 | |
| "Need a Lady"" | Porter | Livin' on the Fault Line | 1977 | |
| "Need a Little Taste of Love" (The Isley Brothers cover) † | Marvin Isley; Ernie Isley; Ronald Isley; O'Kelly Isley; Rudolph Isley; Chris Jasper # | Cycles | 1989 | |
| "New Orleans" | Johnston; Shanks | Walk This Road | 2025 | |
| "New York Dream" | Johnston | World Gone Crazy (bonus track on some editions) | 2010 | |
| "Nobody" † | Johnston | The Doobie Brothers | 1971 | |
| "No Stoppin' Us Now" | Simmons; McDonald; Chris Thompson | One Step Closer | 1980 | |
| "Nothin' But a Heartache" † | McDonald | Livin' on the Fault Line | 1977 | |
| "Oh Mexico" | Johnston; Shanks | Liberté | 2021 | |
| "Olana" | McDonald | Long Train Runnin': 1970–2000 ‡ | 1999 | |
| "Old Juarez" | Johnston | World Gone Crazy | 2010 | |
| "One by One" | LaKind; McDonald | One Step Closer | 1980 | |
| "One Chain (Don't Make No Prison)" | Dennis Lambert; Brian Potter # | Cycles | 1989 | |
| "One Step Closer" † | Knudsen; Carlene Carter; McFee | One Step Closer | 1980 | |
| "On Every Corner" | Knudsen, Zeke Zirngiebel | Sibling Rivalry | 2000 | |
| "Open Your Eyes" | McDonald; Abrams; Patrick Henderson | Minute by Minute | 1978 | |
| "Ordinary Man" † | Bangerter; Michael Ruff; Neida Bequette | Sibling Rivalry | 2000 | |
| "Our Love" | Lynn Williams | Brotherhood | 1991 | |
| "People Gotta Love Again | Johnston | Sibling Rivalry | 2000 | |
| "Précis" | Baxter | Stampede | 1976 | |
| "Pursuit on 53rd St." | Johnston | What Were Once Vices Are Now Habits | 1974 | |
| "Rainy Day Crossroad Blues" | Johnston | Stampede | 1976 | |
| "Real Love" † | McDonald; Patrick Henderson | One Step Closer | 1980 | |
| "Rio" | Simmons; Baxter | Takin' It to the Streets | 1976 | |
| "Road Angel" | John Hartman; Hossack; Johnston; Porter | What Were Once Vices Are Now Habits | 1974 | |
| "Rockin' Down the Highway" † | Johnston | Toulouse Street | 1972 | |
| "Rocking Chair" | Allison; Knudsen | Sibling Rivalry | 2000 | |
| "Rollin' On" † | Johnston | Brotherhood | 1991 | |
| "Shine Your Light" | Johnston; Shanks | Liberté | 2021 | |
| "Showdown" | Johnston | Brotherhood | 1991 | |
| "Slack Key Soquel Rag" | Simmons | Stampede | 1976 | |
| "Slippery St. Paul" | Simmons | The Doobie Brothers | 1971 | |
| "Snake Man" | Johnston | Toulouse Street | 1972 | |
| "Something You Said" | Michael Lunn; Alan Gorrie | Brotherhood | 1991 | |
| "Song to See You Through" | Johnston | What Were Once Vices Are Now Habits | 1974 | |
| "South Bay Strut" | Chet McCracken; McFee | One Step Closer | 1980 | |
| "South City Midnight Lady" | Simmons | The Captain and Me | 1973 | |
| "South of the Border" † | Johnston | Cycles | 1989 | |
| "Speed of Pain" | McDonald; Shanks | Walk This Road | 2025 | |
| "Spirit" | Johnston | What Were Once Vices Are Now Habits | 1974 | |
| "State of Grace" | Simmons; Shanks | Walk This Road | 2025 | |
| "Steamer Lan Breakdown" | Simmons | Minute by Minute | 1978 | |
| "Sweet Feelin'" | Simmons; Templeman | Minute by Minute | 1978 | |
| "Sweet Maxine" † | Johnston; Simmons | Stampede | 1976 | |
| "Take Me in Your Arms (Rock Me a Little While) (Kim Weston cover) † | Holland-Dozier-Holland # | Stampede | 1976 | |
| "Take Me to the Highway" | Simmons; Dale Ockerman; Tom Fedele; Charlie Midnight; Eddie Schwartz | Cycles | 1989 | |
| "Takin' It to the Streets" † | McDonald | Takin' It to the Streets | 1976 | |
| "Tell Me What You Want (And I'll Give You What You Need)" | Simmons | What Were Once Vices Are Now Habits | 1974 | |
| "Texas Lullaby" | Johnston | Stampede | 1976 | |
| "Thank You Love" | Cornelius Bumpus # | One Step Closer | 1980 | |
| "There's a Light" | McDonald | Livin' on the Fault Line | 1977 | |
| "This Train I'm On" | Simmons, Dale Ockerman | Brotherhood | 1991 | |
| "Time is Here and Gone" | LaKind; McFee; Knudsen | Cycles | 1989 | |
| "Too High a Price" | LaKind; Zirngeibel, John Herron | Cycles | 1989 | |
| "Tonight I'm Coming Through (The Border) | LaKind; McDonald | Cycles | 1989 | |
| "Toulouse Street" | Simmons | Toulouse Street | 1972 | |
| "Travelin' Man" | Johnston | The Doobie Brothers | 1971 | |
| "Turn it Loose" | Johnston | Takin' It to the Streets | 1976 | |
| "Ukiah" | Johnston | The Captain and Me | 1973 | |
| "Under the Spell" | Peterik; Bill Syniar; Paul Wertico # | Brotherhood | 1991 | |
| "Walk This Road" † | McDonald; Shanks | Walk This Road | 2025 | |
| "We Are More Than Love" | Simmons; Shanks | Liberté | 2021 | |
| "What a Fool Believes" † | McDonald; Kenny Loggins | Minute by Minute | 1978 | |
| "Wheels of Fortune" † | Simmons; Baxter; Hartman | Takin' It to the Streets | 1976 | |
| "Wherever We Go" | Simmons; Shanks | Liberté | 2021 | |
| "White Sun" | Johnston | Toulouse Street | 1972 | |
| "Without You" | The Doobie Brothers | The Captain and Me | 1973 | |
| "World Gone Crazy" † | Johnston | World Gone Crazy | 2010 | |
| "Wrong Number" | Johnston | Cycles | 1989 | |
| "Wynken, Blynken, and Nod" † | Eugene Field # | In Harmony: A Sesame Street Record ‡ | 1980 | |
| "You Belong to Me" | Carly Simon; McDonald | Livin' on the Fault Line | 1977 | |
| "You Just Can't Stop it" | Simmons | What Were Once Vices Are Now Habits | 1974 | |
| "You Never Change" | Simmons | Minute by Minute | 1978 | |
| "Young Man's Game" | Johnston | World Gone Crazy | 2010 | |
| "You're Made That Way" | McDonald; Baxter; Knudsen | Livin' on the Fault Line | 1977 | |
