= Greatest Hits (The Doobie Brothers album) =

Greatest hits album by The Doobie Brothers
- Released: September 4, 2001
- Genre: Rock
- Length: 1:15:31
- Label: Warner Archives/Rhino
- Producer: Ted Templeman, Lenny Waronker, Eddie Schwartz, Charlie Midnight, Rodney Mills

The Doobie Brothers chronology
Sibling Rivalry (2000)	Greatest Hits (2001)	Doobie's Choice (2002)

Greatest Hits is a 2001 compilation album by the Doobie Brothers. Its 20 songs appear in chronological order of original release, except for their debut single "Nobody" being placed at track 7 because it was reissued in 1974 to greater chart success than its original release. Greatest Hits peaked at number 142 on the US Billboard 200 and it also peaked at number 45 on the UK Albums Chart.

== Reception ==
Professional ratings
Review scores
Source	Rating
AllMusic	4.5/5 stars

Stephen Thomas Erlewine from Allmusic says this collection has all the band's big songs and provides "an excellent introduction-cum-summary of one of the most popular singles-oriented pop/rock bands of the '70s."

== Track listing ==
No.	Title	Writer(s)	Original album	Length
1.	"Listen to the Music"	Tom Johnston	Toulouse Street, 1972	3:26
2.	"Jesus Is Just Alright"	Arthur Reid Reynolds	Toulouse Street, 1972	3:52
3.	"Rockin' Down the Highway"	Johnston	Toulouse Street, 1972	3:21
4.	"Long Train Runnin'"	Johnston	The Captain and Me, 1973	3:27
5.	"Without You"	Johnston, Patrick Simmons, Tiran Porter, John Hartman, Michael Hossack	The Captain and Me, 1973	5:00
6.	"China Grove"	Johnston	The Captain and Me, 1973	3:16
7.	"Nobody"	Johnston	The Doobie Brothers, 1971	3:29
8.	"Black Water"	Simmons	What Were Once Vices Are Now Habits, 1974	4:15
9.	"Take Me in Your Arms (Rock Me)"	Holland-Dozier-Holland	Stampede, 1975	3:40
10.	"It Keeps You Runnin'"	Michael McDonald	Takin' It to the Streets, 1976	4:16
11.	"Takin' It to the Streets"	McDonald	Takin' It to the Streets, 1976	3:47
12.	"You Belong to Me"	McDonald, Carly Simon	Livin' on the Fault Line, 1977	3:06
13.	"Echoes of Love"	Simmons, Willie Mitchell, Earl Randle	Livin' on the Fault Line, 1977	2:58
14.	"What a Fool Believes"	McDonald, Kenny Loggins	Minute by Minute, 1978	3:41
15.	"Minute by Minute"	McDonald, Lester Abrams	Minute by Minute, 1978	3:25
16.	"Dependin' on You"	Simmons, McDonald	Minute by Minute, 1978	3:16
17.	"One Step Closer"	Keith Knudsen, John McFee, Carlene Carter	One Step Closer, 1980	4:09
18.	"Real Love"	McDonald, Patrick Henderson	One Step Closer, 1980	4:18
19.	"The Doctor"	Johnston, Charlie Midnight, Eddie Schwartz	Cycles, 1989	3:46
20.	"Dangerous"	Simmons	Brotherhood, 1991	5:03
Total length:				1:15:31

== Personnel ==
Credits per AllMusic and original studio album liner notes:

=== The Doobie Brothers ===
- Tom Johnston – lead vocals (1, 3–7, 9, 19), backing vocals, guitars (1–9, 19–20), harmonica (4)
- Patrick Simmons – lead vocals (2, 8, 13, 16, 20), backing vocals, guitars (all tracks)
- John Hartman – drums, percussion (all but 15, 17, 18)
- Dave Shogren – bass, backing vocals (7)
- Tiran Porter – bass (all but 7), backing vocals
- Michael Hossack – drums, percussion (1–6, 8, 19–20)
- Jeff Baxter – guitars (9–14, 16)
- Keith Knudsen – drums, percussion, backing vocals (9–18)
- Michael McDonald – lead vocals (10–12, 14–15, 17–18), backing vocals, keyboards, synthesizers (10–18)
- Bobby LaKind – congas, backing vocals (10–19)
- John McFee – guitars, backing vocals (17–18)
- Cornelius Bumpus – lead vocals (17), backing vocals, tenor saxophone, organ (17–18)
- Chet McCracken – drums (17–18)

=== Additional musicians ===
- Bill Payne – piano (1, 6, 19), organ (2), synthesizers (14–15)
- Ted Templeman – percussion, drums (14)
- Novi Novog – viola (8)
- Bobbye Hall – congas (9)
- Sherlie Matthews, Venetta Fields, Jessie Smith – backing vocals (9)
- Jesse Butler – organ (11)
- The Memphis Horns – horns (11, 16, 19)
- Rosemary Butler – backing vocals (12, 16)
- Nicolette Larson – backing vocals (16, 18)
- Patrick Henderson – keyboards (18)
- Paul Riser – string and horn arrangements (9)
- David Paich – string and horn arrangements (12, 13)
- Jimmie Haskell – string arrangement (18)

== Charts ==
Chart (2001)	Position
US Billboard 200	142
UK UK Album Charts	45
