= The Doobie Brothers discography =

Cataloging of published recordings by The Doobie Brothers

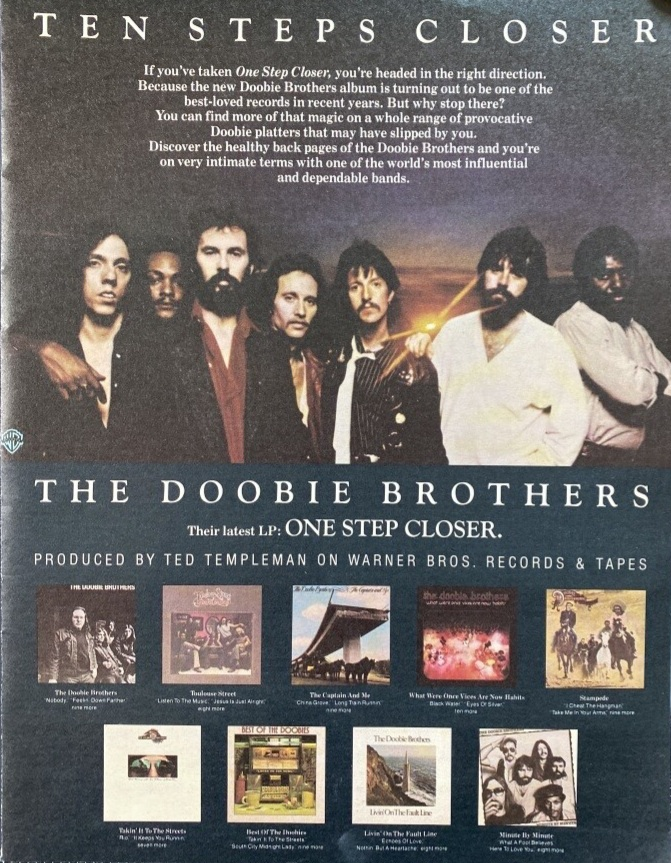
- Trade ad for One Step Closer, 1981
- Studio albums: 16
- Live albums: 6
- Compilation albums: 9
- Singles: 36

The following is a comprehensive discography of the Doobie Brothers, an American rock band. Ten of their albums were certified gold or platinum by the Recording Industry Association of America. Their first greatest hits album, released in 1976, Best of The Doobies, achieved diamond status. Two of the Doobie Brothers' singles hit number one on the Billboard Hot 100: "Black Water" in 1974 and "What A Fool Believes", the latter of which was ranked number 19 on the Billboard Year-End Hot 100 singles of 1979.

== Albums ==
=== Studio albums ===
Year	Album	Peak chart positions							Certifications
Year	Album	US	AUS	CAN	NLD	NZ	SWE	UK	Certifications
1971	The Doobie Brothers: Released: April 30, 1971; Label: Warner Bros.; Format: Vinyl, 8-Track, CS, CD, Digital	—	—	—	—	—	—	—	
1972	Toulouse Street: Released: July 1, 1972; Label: Warner Bros.; Format: Vinyl, 8-Track, CS, CD, Digital	21	57	24	—	30	—	—	US: Platinum; AUS: Gold
1973	The Captain and Me: Released: March 2, 1973; Label: Warner Bros.; Format: LP, Quad	7	—	10	—	12	—	—	US: 2× Platinum; AUS: Gold
1974	What Were Once Vices Are Now Habits: Released: February 1, 1974; Label: Warner Bros.; Format: LP, Quad	4	24	13	—	17	—	19	US: 2× Platinum; AUS: Gold; UK: Silver
1975	Stampede: Released: April 25, 1975; Label: Warner Bros.; Format: LP, Quad, CD	4	6	5	11	5	—	14	US: Gold; AUS: Gold; UK: Silver
1976	Takin' It to the Streets: Released: March 19, 1976; Label: Warner Bros.; Format: LP, cassette, CD	8	7	18	11	7	—	42	US: Platinum; UK: Silver
1977	Livin' on the Fault Line: Released: August 19, 1977; Label: Warner Bros.; Format: LP, cassette, CD	10	16	12	—	14	40	25	US: Gold
1978	Minute by Minute: Released: December 1, 1978; Label: Warner Bros.; Format: LP, cassette, CD	1	6	1	72	6	46	—	US: 3× Platinum; CAN: Platinum
1980	One Step Closer: Released: September 17, 1980; Label: Warner Bros.; Format: LP, cassette, CD	3	18	18	42	22	—	53	US: Platinum
1989	Cycles: Released: May 17, 1989; Label: Capitol; Format: CD, cassette, LP	17	44	8	69	32	—	—	US: Gold; CAN: Platinum
1991	Brotherhood: Released: April 15, 1991; Label: Capitol; Format: CD, cassette, LP	82	—	18	85	—	—	—	
2000	Sibling Rivalry: Released: October 3, 2000; Label: Pyramid / Rhino; Format: CD, LP	—	—	—	—	—	—	—	
2010	World Gone Crazy: Released: September 28, 2010; Label: DooBro Entertainment / HOR; Format: CD, LP, download	39	—	—	—	—	—	—	
2014	Southbound: Released: November 4, 2014; Label: Arista Nashville; Format: CD, LP, download	16	—	—	—	—	—	—	
2021	Liberté: Released: October 29, 2021; Label: DB Entertainment / Island; Format: CD, LP, download	—	—	—	—	—	—	—	
2025	Walk This Road: Released: June 6, 2025; Label: Warner Bros. / Rhino; Format: CD, LP, download	76	—	—	—	—	—	92	
"—" denotes releases that did not chart.

=== Live albums ===
Year	Album	Chart positions		Certifications
Year	Album	US	CAN	Certifications
1983	Farewell Tour: Released: June 1983; Label: Rhino Encore; Format: LP, Cassette, CD	79	87	
1996	Rockin' down the Highway: The Wildlife Concert: Released: July 25, 1996; Label: Sony Music Distribution; Format: CD, cassette, LP	—	—	
1999	Best of The Doobie Brothers Live: Released: June 1, 1999; Label: Sony; Format: CD, LP	—	—	
2004	Live at Wolf Trap: Released: October 26, 2004; Label: Sanctuary; Format: CD, DVD, download	—	—	AUS: Gold (DVD)
2011	Live at the Greek Theatre 1982: Released: June 28, 2011; Label: Eagle; Format: CD, DVD, download	—	—	
2019	Live from the Beacon Theatre: Released: June 28, 2019; Label: Rhino; Format: CD, DVD, Blu-ray, download	—	—	
"—" denotes releases that did not chart.

=== Compilation albums ===
Year	Album	Chart positions					Certifications
Year	Album	US	AUS	CAN	NZ	UK	Certifications
1976	Best of The Doobies: Released: October 29, 1976; Label: Warner Bros.; Format: LP, cassette, CD (later)	5	42	3	13	—	AUS: 3× Platinum; US: Diamond (10× Platinum); CAN: 2× Platinum; UK: Silver
1981	Best of The Doobies Volume II: Released: November 1981; Label: Warner Bros.; Format: LP, cassette, CD	39	46	—	—	—	AUS: Gold; US: Gold
1993	Listen to the Music: The Very Best of The Doobie Brothers: Released: May 24, 1993; Label: WEA; Format: CD, cassette, LP	—	10	41	19	—	AUS: 2× Platinum; CAN: Gold; NZ: 2× Platinum; UK: Gold
1999	Long Train Runnin': 1970–2000: Released: September 14, 1999; Label: Rhino; Format: 4xCD	—	—	—	—	—	
2001	Greatest Hits: Released: September 4, 2001; Label: Rhino; Format: CD	142	—	—	—	45	UK: Silver
2002	Doobie's Choice: Released: February 19, 2002; Label: Rhino; Format: CD, LP	—	—	—	—	—	
2003	Divided Highway: Released: February 25, 2003; Label: Simply the Best; Format: CD	—	—	—	—	—	
2007	The Very Best of The Doobie Brothers: Released: March 13, 2007; Label: Rhino/WEA; Format: CD	—	—	—	—	—	UK: Silver
"—" denotes releases that did not chart.

=== Unauthorized releases ===
There have been several unauthorized collections taken from the same set of 13 early demos, including On Our Way Up which was released in 2001.

== Singles ==
Year	Title	Peak chart positions							Certifications	Album
Year	Title	US Hot	US AC	US MR	AUS	CAN	NLD	UK	Certifications	Album
1971	"Nobody"	122	—	—	—	—	—	—		The Doobie Brothers
1972	"Listen to the Music"	11	—	—	50	3	7	29	BPI: Gold	Toulouse Street
1972	"Jesus Is Just Alright"	35	—	—	—	33	17	—		Toulouse Street
1973	"Long Train Runnin'"	8	—	—	58	8	10	7	BPI: Gold	The Captain and Me
1973	"China Grove"	15	—	—	61	9	21	—		The Captain and Me
1974	"Another Park, Another Sunday"	32	—	—	—	—	—	—		What Were Once Vices Are Now Habits
1974	"Eyes of Silver"	52	—	—	—	—	—	—		What Were Once Vices Are Now Habits
1974	"Nobody" (reissue)	58	—	—	—	—	—	—		The Doobie Brothers
1974	"Black Water"	1	38	—	22	9	—	—		What Were Once Vices Are Now Habits
1975	"Take Me in Your Arms (Rock Me)"	11	—	—	34	11	—	29		Stampede
1975	"Sweet Maxine"	40	—	—	—	—	—	—		Stampede
1975	"I Cheat the Hangman"	60	—	—	—	—	—	—		Stampede
1976	"Takin' It to the Streets"	13	—	—	94	7	—	—		Takin' It to the Streets
1976	"Wheels of Fortune"	87	—	—	—	—	—	—		Takin' It to the Streets
1976	"It Keeps You Runnin'"	37	—	—	—	39	—	—		Takin' It to the Streets
1977	"Little Darling (I Need You)"	48	—	—	55	—	—	—		Livin' on the Fault Line
1977	"Echoes of Love"	66	—	—	—	—	—	—		Livin' on the Fault Line
1977	"Nothin' But a Heartache"	—	—	—	—	—	—	—		Livin' on the Fault Line
1979	"What a Fool Believes"	1	22	—	12	1	10	31	BPI: Silver	Minute by Minute
1979	"Minute by Minute"	14	13	—	—	17	—	47		Minute by Minute
1979	"Dependin' on You"	25	37	—	—	35	—	—		Minute by Minute
1980	"Real Love"	5	10	—	53	12	—	—		One Step Closer
1980	"One Step Closer"	24	21	—	—	—	—	—		One Step Closer
1980	"Wynken, Blynken & Nod"	76	31	—	—	—	—	—		In Harmony: A Sesame Street Record
1981	"Keep This Train A-Rollin'"	62	—	—	—	—	—	—		One Step Closer
1981	"Can't Let It Get Away"	—	—	—	—	—	—	—		Can't Let It Get Away (Japan-only compilation)
1982	"Here to Love You"	65	—	—	—	—	—	—		Best of The Doobies Volume II (Minute by Minute)
1983	"You Belong to Me" (live)	79	—	—	—	—	—	—		Farewell Tour
1989	"The Doctor"	9	31	1	32	14	37	73		Cycles
1989	"Need a Little Taste of Love"	45	27	3	—	—	63	—		Cycles
1989	"South of the Border"	—	—	30	—	—	—	—		Cycles
1991	"Dangerous"	—	—	2	171	—	—	—		Brotherhood
1991	"Rollin' On"	—	—	12	—	—	—	—		Brotherhood
2001	"Ordinary Man"	—	29	—	—	—	—	—		Sibling Rivalry
2010	"Nobody"	—	—	—	—	—	—	—		World Gone Crazy
2011	"World Gone Crazy"	—	—	—	—	—	—	—		World Gone Crazy
2022	"Easy"	—	16	—	—	—	—	—		Liberté
2025	"Learn to Let Go"	—	23	—	—	—	—	—		Walk This Road
"—" denotes releases that did not chart.

== Other appearances ==
Year	Song	Album
1994	"What a Fool Believes" (live version)	Grammy's Greatest Moments Volume II
