= Rockin' down the Highway: The Wildlife Concert =

Rockin' Down the Highway: The Wildlife Concert

Live album by The Doobie Brothers
- Released: July 1996
- Recorded: May 6, 1996 New York, NY May 11, 1996 Nashville, TN
- Genre: Rock
- Label: Sony
- Producer: The Doobie Brothers; Charlie Midnight

The Doobie Brothers chronology
Listen to the Music: The Very Best of The Doobie Brothers (1993)	Rockin' Down the Highway: The Wildlife Concert (1996)	Sibling Rivalry (2000)

Professional ratings
Review scores
Source	Rating
Allmusic	2/5 stars
Entertainment Weekly	C−

Rockin' Down the Highway: The Wildlife Concert is the second double live album by American rock band The Doobie Brothers, released in 1996 (see 1996 in music). The concerts were performed to benefit the Wildlife Conservation Society, hence the album's title.

The album marked the first appearance on a Doobie Brothers album of guitarist John McFee and drummer Keith Knudsen since rejoining the group in 1993 after an eleven-year absence. Two other former members also appeared - keyboardist/singer/songwriter Michael McDonald performed on three tracks he had written and sung during his time with the group while saxophonist/keyboardist Cornelius Bumpus, who had been a member in the early 1980s, featured as a sidesman.

Two tracks had not previously appeared on the group's albums. "Slow Burn" was a new track while "Wild Ride" had been on Patrick Simmons' solo album Take Me to the Highway released the same year.

== Track listing ==
Disc 1

1. "Dangerous" (Patrick Simmons) – 5:58
2. "Jesus Is Just Alright" (Arthur Reid Reynolds) – 4:51
3. "Take Me in Your Arms (Rock Me a Little While)" (Holland-Dozier-Holland) – 3:48
4. "Slow Burn" (Tom Johnston, John McFee, Keith Knudsen, Michael Hossack) – 4:44
5. "Dependin' on You" (Simmons, Michael McDonald) – 4:13
6. "Another Park, Another Sunday" (Johnston) – 5:04
7. "The Doctor" (Johnston, Charlie Midnight, Eddie Schwartz) – 4:31
8. "Slack Key Soquel Rag" (Simmons) – 1:59
9. "South City Midnight Lady" (Simmons) – 5:37
10. "Eyes of Silver" (Johnston) – 3:12
11. "Black Water" (Simmons) – 4:32
12. "Takin' It to the Streets" (McDonald) – 4:42

Disc 2

1. "Rockin' Down the Highway" (Johnston) – 3:28
2. "Minute by Minute" (McDonald, Lester Abrams) – 4:22
3. "Wild Ride" (Simmons, Midnight) – 3:54
4. "China Grove" (Johnston) – 4:02
5. "Dark Eyed Cajun Woman" (Johnston) – 5:58
6. "Neal's Fandango" (Simmons) – 3:27
7. "Without You" (Johnston) (Note: On The Captain and Me and Best of The Doobies this song is credited to "The Doobie Brothers".) – 6:45
8. "Clear as the Driven Snow" (Simmons) – 5:22
9. "Excited" (Johnston, Jerry Lynn Williams) – 5:30
10. "What a Fool Believes" (McDonald, Kenny Loggins) – 3:54
11. "Long Train Runnin'" (Johnston) – 5:55
12. "Listen to the Music" (Johnston) – 5:29

== Personnel ==
The Doobie Brothers

- Tom Johnston – lead and backing vocals, guitars
- Patrick Simmons – lead and backing vocals, guitars
- John McFee – backing vocals, guitars, slide guitar, pedal steel guitar, violin
- Michael Hossack – drums
- Keith Knudsen – backing vocals, drums

Former Doobie Brothers appearing as guests

- Michael McDonald – lead vocals and keyboards on "Takin' It to the Streets", "Minute by Minute" and "What a Fool Believes"
- Cornelius Bumpus – backing vocals, lead vocal on "Jesus Is Just Alright", saxophones, flute, keyboards

Additional personnel

- Skylark – backing vocals, bass
- Danny Hull – backing vocals, saxophones, harmonica, keyboards, percussion
- Dale Ockerman – backing vocals, keyboards, guitar
- Guy Allison – keyboards
- Carlos Guaico – backing vocals, percussion
- Buck Johnson – backing vocals, percussion

== Production ==
- Producers: Charlie Midnight, The Doobie Brothers
- Executive Producers: Jeff Jones, Andy Kadison
- Engineer: John Harris
- Assistant Engineer: Tom Cadley
- Mastering: Gavin Lurssen, Doug Sax
- Mixing: Joel Soyffer
- Mixing Assistant: Joe Warlick
- Photography: Danny Clinch
- Design: Erwin Gorostiza
- Art Direction: Erwin Gorostiza
