= Jesus Is Just Alright =

1966 song written by Art Reynolds

Song by The Art Reynolds Singers

from the album Tellin' It Like It Is
- Released: 1966
- Recorded: 1965
- Genre: Gospel
- Length: 1:55
- Label: Capitol
- Songwriter: Arthur Reid Reynolds
- Producer: Gary Paxton

"Jesus Is Just Alright" is a gospel song written by American singer Art Reynolds and first recorded by Reynolds' group, The Art Reynolds Singers, for their 1966 album, Tellin' It Like It Is.

The song's title makes use of the American slang term "just alright", which during the 1960s was used to describe something that was considered cool or hip. The song has been covered by various bands and artists over the years, including the Byrds, Underground Sunshine, the Doobie Brothers, Alexis Korner, the Ventures, DC Talk, Stryper, Shelagh McDonald, and Robert Randolph (featuring Eric Clapton).

The first cover version of the song was recorded by the Byrds on their 1969 album Ballad of Easy Rider. The Doobie Brothers included their version on their 1972 album Toulouse Street. Released as a single in November 1972, this version peaked at No. 35 on the Billboard Hot 100. In 1973, American rock band Exile released their self titled debut album, which included a cover of the song. In 1992, the Christian rock and hip hop group DC Talk released a version of "Jesus Is Just Alright" on their Free at Last album. The song has also been covered by Robert Randolph on his Colorblind album, with guest artist Eric Clapton and Stryper's 2013 release, No More Hell to Pay.

== The Byrds version ==
"Jesus Is Just Alright"
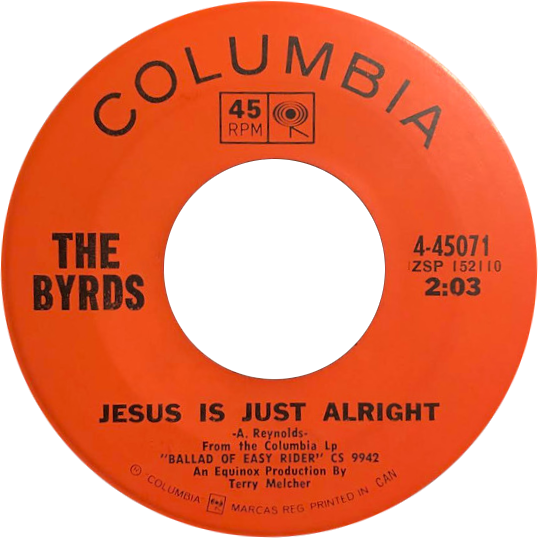
- Side A of the Canadian single

Single by The Byrds

from the album Ballad of Easy Rider
- B-side: "It's All Over Now, Baby Blue"
- Released: December 15, 1969
- Recorded: June 17, 1969
- Studio: Columbia Studios, Hollywood, CA
- Genre: Rock, gospel
- Length: 2:10
- Label: Columbia
- Songwriter: Arthur Reid Reynolds
- Producer: Terry Melcher

The Byrds singles chronology
"Ballad of Easy Rider" (1969)	"Jesus Is Just Alright" (1969)	"Chestnut Mare" (1970)

Official audio
- "Jesus Is Just Alright" by the Byrds on YouTube

The Byrds' version of "Jesus Is Just Alright" was recorded on June 17, 1969, during the sessions for the band's eighth studio album, Ballad of Easy Rider. It was first released as part of that album but was subsequently issued as a single on December 15, 1969. The single stalled at No. 97 on the Billboard Hot 100 and failed to chart in the United Kingdom. Despite this lack of commercial success, the Doobie Brothers' later hit version of the song featured an arrangement that was heavily influenced by the Byrds' recording.

The song was introduced to the Byrds by the band's drummer, Gene Parsons, who had been present in the studio when the Art Reynolds Singers had recorded it. The Byrds had added the song to their live concert repertoire some months before the start of the Ballad of Easy Rider recording sessions, and it had quickly become an audience favorite. In concert, the Byrds rendition of "Jesus Is Just Alright" began with a wordless vocal introduction that built up and led into the first iteration of the song's chorus. This distinctive vocal arrangement had been devised by Parsons. Still, once the band was in the studio, record producer Terry Melcher dispensed with the extended intro, giving the song a more pop-oriented arrangement.

Cash Box said, "dropping a good deal of their country trappings and accenting some blazing instrumental arrangements, the Byrds take flight with a marvel in the material department." Record World called it an "out-of-sight driving rocker." Billboard said that "the Terry Melcher production work is first rate."

"Jesus Is Just Alright" became a staple of the Byrds' concert repertoire between 1969 and 1971, but appears to have been performed only rarely after that. Additionally, the band performed the song on the U.S. television programs Memphis Talent Party and The Midnight Special in 1970 and 1972 respectively.

Besides its appearance on the Ballad of Easy Rider album, "Jesus Is Just Alright" can also be found on several Byrds compilations, including The Best of The Byrds: Greatest Hits, Volume II, History of The Byrds, The Byrds, The Essential Byrds, and There Is a Season. Live recordings of the song are included on the expanded edition of The Byrds' (Untitled) album as well as on Live at Royal Albert Hall 1971.

== The Doobie Brothers version ==
"Jesus Is Just Alright"
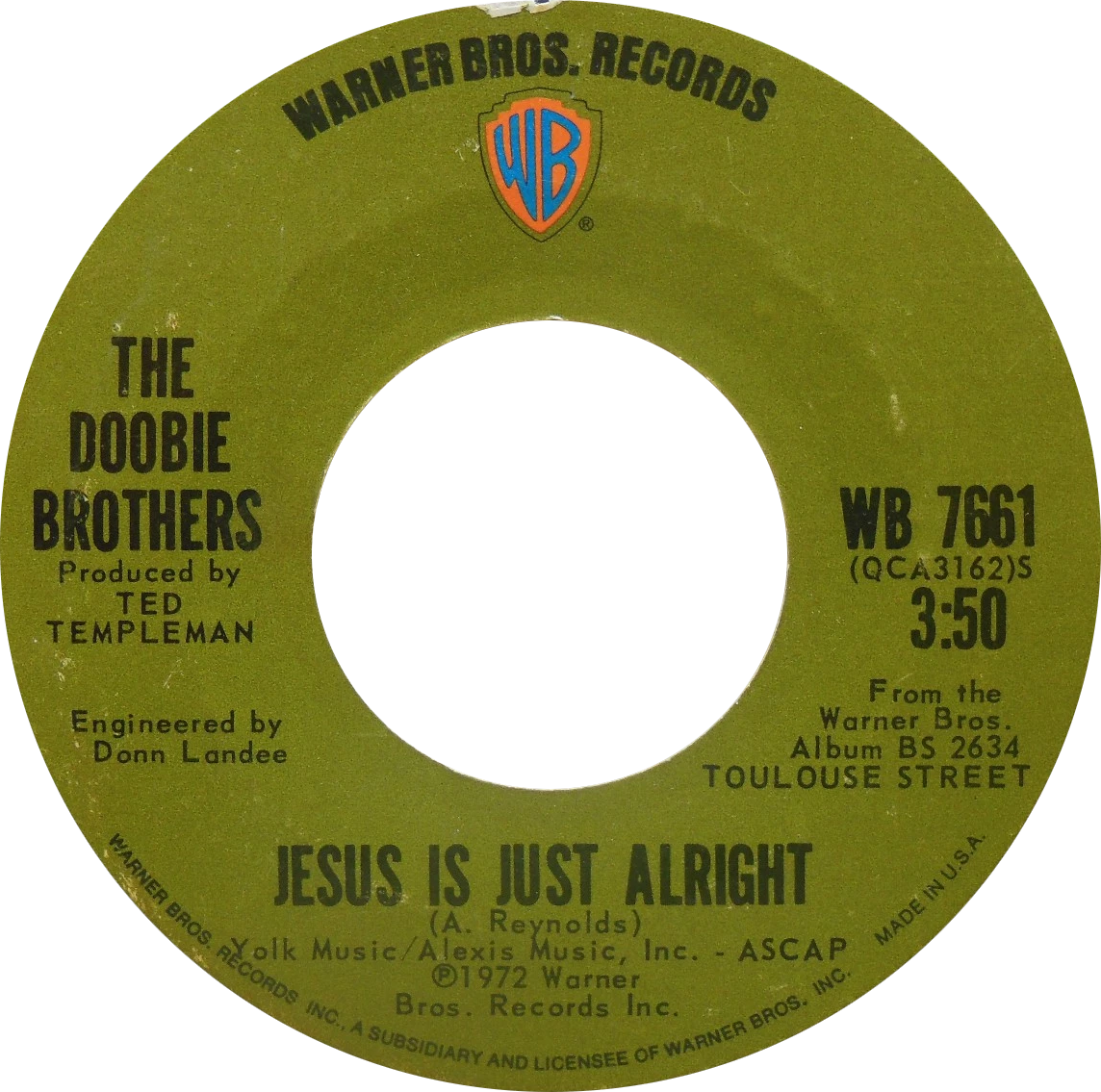
- US single of the Doobie Brothers recording

Single by The Doobie Brothers

from the album Toulouse Street
- B-side: "Rockin' Down the Highway"
- Released: November 15, 1972
- Recorded: 1972
- Studio: Warner Bros. Studios, Hollywood, CA
- Genre: Pop, rock, funk
- Length: 4:36 (Album version); 3:50 (Single edit)
- Label: Warner Bros.
- Songwriter: Arthur Reid Reynolds
- Producer: Ted Templeman

The Doobie Brothers singles chronology
"Listen to the Music" (1972)	"Jesus Is Just Alright" (1972)	"Long Train Runnin'" (1973)

Audio
- "Jesus Is Just Alright with Me" (2007 Remaster) on YouTube

The Doobie Brothers' version of "Jesus Is Just Alright" was first released on their second album, Toulouse Street, in 1972. It was subsequently released in November 1972 as the second single from the album (b/w "Rockin' Down the Highway") and went on to become a U.S. hit, peaking at No. 35 on the Billboard Hot 100 in February 1973. On the New Zealand Listener charts it reached No.8. The single featured a shorter, edited version of the song compared to the one included on the album. The Doobie Brothers' version of "Jesus Is Just Alright" was one of several religiously themed songs to reach the U.S. charts between 1969 and 1973. (Note: Other religiously-themed songs to reach the charts at this time included "Spirit in the Sky" by Norman Greenbaum, "Put Your Hand in the Hand" by Ocean, "Superstar" by Murray Head, "Morning Has Broken" by Cat Stevens, "Jubilation" by Paul Anka, "Speak to the Sky" by Rick Springfield, "Jesus Was a Capricorn" and "Why Me" by Kris Kristofferson, "My Sweet Lord" by George Harrison and "I Knew Jesus (Before He Was a Star)" by Glen Campbell.) The song, along with its B-side, continues to be a staple of playlists on classic rock radio stations.

The band first became aware of "Jesus Is Just Alright" after hearing the Byrds' version. Before long, the song had been added to the Doobie Brothers' live repertoire. As a result, the Doobies' musical arrangement is very similar to the one used by the Byrds. However, the Doobie Brothers' rendition includes an extra bridge that the band added themselves. In 2007, bassist Tiran Porter claimed that the idea of adding a slow bridge was his, including the lyrics "Jesus is my friend", but due to the high vocal range demanded, guitarist Patrick Simmons sang lead instead of him. Although none of the individual band members were religiously inclined, the song went on to become very popular among Christians during the early 1970s, particularly those within the hippie counterculture that were involved with the Jesus movement.

Record World said, "Vocally and musically, this is a strong record."

In addition to its appearance on Toulouse Street, the song can also be found on several Doobie Brothers compilations, including Best of The Doobies, Listen to the Music: The Very Best of The Doobie Brothers, Long Train Runnin': 1970–2000, Greatest Hits, and The Very Best of The Doobie Brothers. Live recordings of the song appear on the Farewell Tour, Rockin' down the Highway: The Wildlife Concert, and Live at Wolf Trap albums.

=== Personnel ===
- Patrick Simmons – lead vocals, guitars
- Tom Johnston – backing vocals, guitars
- Tiran Porter – backing vocals, bass
- John (Little John) Hartman – drums, percussion
- Michael Hossack – drums

=== Additional personnel ===
- Bill Payne – organ
- Ted Templeman – percussion

== DC Talk version ==
"Jesus Is Just Alright"

Single by DC Talk

from the album Free at Last
- Released: 1992
- Recorded: 1992
- Genre: Hip hop, Christian rock
- Length: 4:41 (album version)
- Label: ForeFront
- Songwriter: Arthur Reid Reynolds
- Producers: Toby McKeehan, Mark Heimermann

DC Talk singles chronology
"Can I Get a Witness" (1992)	"Jesus Is Just Alright" (1992)	"Lean on Me" (1993)

Music video
- "Jesus Is Just Alright" (Official Music Video) on YouTube

"Jesus Is Just Alright" is a Dove Award-winning single by Christian rock and hip hop band, DC Talk. It was the lead single for their 1992 platinum-selling and Grammy Award-winning album, Free at Last. The band's primary songwriter, TobyMac (Toby McKeehan), retained the song's chorus but added several new verses consisting of his lyrics. These lyrics were rapped, as was usual with DC Talk's songs of the period, with the lead vocal alternating between McKeehan's rapped verses and the sung chorus provided by Kevin Max (then known as Kevin Smith) and Michael Tait.

DC Talk's version also includes subtle lyric alterations by McKeehan, with the line "Jesus is just alright" being intermittently changed to "Jesus is still alright", which reflected the songwriter's feeling that Jesus was still alright with him, even if others did not share his beliefs. Thus, DC Talk's recording is an update on the previous version. The lyrics comment on the lack of acceptance and recognition faith-based music often receives from mainstream radio. In addition to being musically based upon the earlier Byrds and Doobie Brothers' recordings, DC Talk's version of the song also features samples of Madonna's hit single "Vogue" and the Snap! song "The Power".

In the audio commentary of the Free at Last – The Movie bonus DVD, Tait identified "Jesus Is Just Alright" as the song that DC Talk has performed most in their live shows. It has been played at every concert since 1992 and is the only song to be played on each of their four major headlining tours: Free At Last (1994), Jesus Freak – The Tour (Spring 1996), The Supernatural Experience (Spring 1999), and An Evening with DC Talk (Spring 2001).

The song's music video was shot entirely in muted sepia-tone and featured DC Talk singing around three crosses in a desert, surrounded by musicians and dancers. It concludes with the band walking off into the desert sunset.

At the 24th GMA Dove Awards in 1994, "Jesus Is Just Alright" was awarded the Dove Award for Best Rock Recorded Song. DC Talk also became one of the first contemporary Christian acts to perform on late-night television when, on November 12, 1993, the band performed "Jesus Is Just Alright" on The Tonight Show with Jay Leno.

"Jesus Is Just Alright" was also used in a Christian Television Association advertisement from 1994, which combined the music video with interview clips from their Rap, Rock, & Soul video. The ad ran for over a decade, and helped introduce DC Talk to Australian audiences.

=== CD single track listing ===
US radio promo

1. "Jesus Is Just Alright" (album version) – 4:41
2. "Jesus Is Just Alright" (Funky, Wit Less Rap) – 4:08
3. "Jesus Is Just Alright" (Still Funky, Wit No Rap) – 3:38
4. "Jesus Is Just Alright" (With Original Blues Bridge) – 4:51
5. "Jesus Is Just Alright" (Reprise) – 1:03
6. "Yo! Ho Ho" – 4:14
7. "Two Honks and a Negro" – 0:19
8. "Free at Last Album Spot" – 1:01

Japanese radio promo

1. "Jesus Is Just Alright" (album version) – 4:41
2. "Jesus Is Just Alright" (Funky, Wit Less Rap) – 4:08
3. "Jesus Is Just Alright" (Still Funky, Wit No Rap) – 3:38
4. "Jesus Is Just Alright" (With Original Blues Bridge) – 4:51
5. "Jesus Is Just Alright" (Reprise) – 1:03
