= Another Park, Another Sunday =

Single by The Doobie Brothers

from the album What Were Once Vices Are Now Habits
- B-side: "Black Water"
- Released: March 13, 1974
- Genre: Rock
- Length: 4:27
- Label: Warner Bros.
- Songwriter: Tom Johnston
- Producer: Ted Templeman

The Doobie Brothers singles chronology
"China Grove" (1973)	"Another Park, Another Sunday" (1974)	"Eyes of Silver" (1974)

"Another Park, Another Sunday" is a song by American rock band The Doobie Brothers. It was released as the lead single from their fourth studio album What Were Once Vices Are Now Habits on March 13, 1974. It peaked at number 32 on the Billboard Hot 100 the week of June 8, 1974. On the New Zealand Listener charts it peaked at number 18. The song was later included on the compilation The Very Best of the Doobie Brothers (2007).

Despite reaching the top 40, the song fell short of the band's previous singles, both of which had cracked the top 20. However, the single's B-side, "Black Water" started to receive more airplay. The band then released "Black Water" as an A-side (the third single from the album), and it eventually became the band's first number one hit.

== Background ==
Billboard has described "Another Park, Another Sunday" as a "tale of heartbreak and loss."

Music writer Steve Millward described the Doobie Brothers as being technically proficient without self-indulgence and noted that the songs on What Were Once Vices Are Now Habits are almost all up-tempo rockers. He considered "Another Park, Another Sunday" is a partial exception, stating that "even when they threaten to go in another direction – as on the reflective 'Another Park, Another Sunday'...the lure of returning to their comfort zone is too strong."

Songwriter and vocalist Tom Johnston blamed its relative lack of success on reaction from FM radio stations due to a certain line: "[the song] was doing real well [in single release], and then it got yanked off the radio for the line '…and the radio just seems to bring me down'".

In 1980, Pickwick International, Inc. released an album, entitled Introducing The Doobie Brothers, of the band's earliest songs recorded in 1970. The last song on side two, "I'll Keep On Giving", serves as a loose precursor to "Another Park, Another Sunday", featuring a near-identical melody.

== Reception ==
Cashbox called "Another Park, Another Sunday" an "almost lazy Summer Sunday afternoon type track" and found it likely to be a hit on pop and progressive radio stations. Record World said that it was "gentler fare" than previous Doobie Brothers' hits and "more melodic and easy-tempoed this time, in tune with the pastoral weekend setting." Allmusic critic Bruce Eder said it "[outdoes] the Eagles and Poco at their respective country-rock games (and [keeps] a certain soulful edge, too). Billboard ranked it fifth in their list of the ten best Doobie Brothers songs.

== Track listing ==
1. "Another Park, Another Sunday" (Tom Johnston) – 4:27
2. "Black Water" (Patrick Simmons) – 4:15

== Personnel ==
- Tom Johnston – rhythm guitar, vocals
- Patrick Simmons – guitar, vocals
- Tiran Porter – bass guitar, vocals
- John Hartman – drums, percussion
- Michael Hossack – drums
- Milt Holland – vibraphone
