= China Grove (song) =

- West German single sleeve

Single by The Doobie Brothers

from the album The Captain and Me
- B-side: "Evil Woman"
- Released: July 25, 1973
- Recorded: 1972
- Studio: Warner Bros. Studios, North Hollywood, Los Angeles
- Genre: Country rock; pop rock; power pop
- Length: 3:16
- Label: Warner Bros.
- Songwriter: Tom Johnston
- Producer: Ted Templeman

The Doobie Brothers singles chronology
"Long Train Runnin'" (1973)	"China Grove" (1973)	"Another Park, Another Sunday"/"Black Water" (1974)

Official audio
- "China Grove" on YouTube

"China Grove" is a song by American rock band the Doobie Brothers, released in 1973 on their third studio album, The Captain and Me. It was written and sung by the band's original lead singer and songwriter Tom Johnston. The song reached number 15 on the US Billboard Hot 100. While there is a real place named China Grove in Texas, Johnston's lyrics about the community are mostly fictional. The song spent eight weeks in the Top 40.

== Composition and recording ==
In 2010, examination of the master recording tape for the track by recording engineer Chris Baseford revealed that, as most bands did at the time, the band played together while tracking in the studio instead of overdubbing the instrumental elements.

The production on the song was described as "pretty standard". Aside from the drums, panned slightly off center, additional percussion like a tambourine and hand clapping overdubs were added. Baseford described the bass performance and sound on this song as "top notch" with Tiran Porter playing the melodic line using a pick and plugging directly into the mixing board.

The song uses a clavé rhythm. Lead singer and songwriter Tom Johnston plays the distinctive opening guitar riff.

== Origins ==
Like many songs by Johnston, the music was composed and developed before the lyrics were written. It started with a guitar riff that he and drummer John Hartman developed into a jam with a chord structure. Johnston said that the lyrics were influenced by a piano part in the performance. According to Johnston, "...I really owe Billy Payne for the words because he played this wacky bridge that started the thinking process with this wacky sheriff, samurai swords, and all that."

The lyrics by Johnston concern a sheriff in the fictional town of "China Grove" in Texas. It wasn't until a few years later that Johnston learned from a cab driver in Houston that there is a real China Grove, Texas. Johnson surmised he must have "seen" but didn't see a road sign with that name while traveling on tour in an RV near San Antonio. The name stuck in his mind and later emerged in the song, he thought, purely from imagination.

== Reception ==
Upon the single release, Record World said that the "group has now had three straight hit singles, and this mover will keep their streak alive." Ultimate Classic Rock critic Michael Gallucci rated "China Grove" as the Doobie Brothers' fifth-greatest song, praising the guitar riffs and calling it "the group's toughest-sounding song." The staff of Billboard rated it as the Doobie Brothers' fourth-best song, saying that the guitar riffs that begin the song are "the stuff of air guitar legend" and that "the 'sleepy little town' comes alive in clear detail".

== Appearances in other media ==
This was used as the theme song for the FOX primetime game show Don't Forget the Lyrics! hosted by Wayne Brady from 2007 until 2009.

== Personnel ==
=== The Doobie Brothers ===
- Tom Johnston – lead guitar, lead and backing vocals
- Patrick Simmons – rhythm guitar, backing vocals
- Tiran Porter – bass, backing vocals
- John Hartman – drums, percussion, backing vocals
- Michael Hossack – drums

=== Additional personnel ===
- Bill Payne – piano

== Chart performance ==
=== Weekly charts ===
Chart (1973)	Peak position
Australian (Kent Music Report)	61
Canada (RPM) Top Singles	9
Canada (RPM) Adult Contemporary	71
Netherlands (Single Top 100)	21
U.S. Billboard Hot 100	15
U.S. Cash Box Top 100	8

=== Year-end charts ===
Chart (1973)	Rank
Canada RPM Top Singles	124
U.S. Joel Whitburn's Pop Annual	116

== Certifications ==
Region	Certification	Certified units/sales
New Zealand (RMNZ)	Gold	15,000^{‡}
^{‡} Sales+streaming figures based on certification alone.
