= Black Water (song) =

Single by the Doobie Brothers

from the album What Were Once Vices Are Now Habits
- A-side: "Another Park, Another Sunday"
- Released: November 15, 1974
- Recorded: 1973
- Studio: Warner Bros. Studios, North Hollywood, CA, Burbank Studios, Burbank, CA
- Genre: Roots rock; country rock; Southern rock; bluegrass
- Length: 4:15
- Label: Warner Bros.
- Songwriter: Patrick Simmons
- Producer: Ted Templeman

The Doobie Brothers singles chronology
"Nobody (reissue)" (1974)	"Black Water" (1974)	"Take Me in Your Arms (Rock Me)" (1975)

Official audio
- "Black Water (2006 Remaster)" on YouTube

"Black Water" is a song recorded by the American music group the Doobie Brothers from their 1974 album What Were Once Vices Are Now Habits. The track features its composer Patrick Simmons on lead vocals and, in mid-March 1975, became the first of the Doobie Brothers' two No. 1 hit singles.

== Composition ==
Well, I built me a raft and she's ready for floatin'
Ol' Mississippi, she's callin' my name
Catfish are jumpin', that paddle wheel thumpin'
Black water keep rollin' on past just the same

— opening lyrics to "Black Water", written by P. Simmons

Patrick Simmons recalled that he chanced on the basic guitar lick for "Black Water" while at Warner Bros. Recording Studio (NoHo) for the recording sessions for the Doobie Brothers' 1973 album The Captain and Me: "I was sitting out in the studio waiting between takes and I played that part. All the sudden I heard the talk-back go on and [producer] Ted Templeman says: 'What is that?' I said: 'It’s just a little riff that I came up with that I’ve been tweaking with.' He goes: 'I love that. You really should write a song using that riff.'"

Simmons completed "Black Water" during a subsequent Doobie Brothers' sojourn in New Orleans; a lifelong aficionado of Delta blues, Simmons had first visited New Orleans for a 1971 Doobie Brothers gig: "When I got down there it was everything I had hoped it would be...The way of life and vibe really connected with me and the roots of my music." Simmons cites the song's opening section as "my childhood imaginings of the South from reading Huckleberry Finn and Tom Sawyer". The lyrics subsequent to the first chorus draw on his experience of New Orleans: "going down to the French Quarter as often as possible and going into the clubs and listening to Dixieland".

The lyric Well if it rains, I don't care/ Don't make no difference to me/ Just take that street car that's goin' uptown was jotted down by Simmons while riding through the University District on the St. Charles Streetcar Line en route to the Garden District in Uptown New Orleans to do laundry. He recalled that "the sun was shining while it was pouring rain the way it does down there sometimes. And the lyrics just came to me there [on the streetcar]."

"Black Water" is distinguished by its melodious a cappella section, whose lyrics are the song's prevalent hook lines: "I'd like to hear some funky Dixieland/ Pretty mama, come and take me by the hand." These lines are also featured in the Train song, "I Got You" (from Save Me San Francisco) on which Simmons received a co-writing credit. Producer Ted Templeman said of the a cappella section of "Black Water": "I stole the idea from my old producer", referencing his stint as lead singer of sunshine pop act Harpers Bizarre whose 1967 hit rendition of "The 59th Street Bridge Song (Feelin' Groovy)" had featured a harmonic a cappella section (Harpers Bizarre had been produced by Lenny Waronker). "Black Water" also features a viola performance by Ilene "Novi" Novog credited mononymously as Novi.

== Original B-side release ==
Ted Templeman said that "we never thought [of] it as a [potential hit] single." - "I put 'Black Water' on [a] B-side because I figured [it was] an acoustic thing." "Black Water" was utilized as the B-side for the lead single from the Doobie Brothers' 1974 album release What Were Once Vices Are Now Habits, the A-side being "Another Park, Another Sunday" whose June 1974 Billboard Hot 100 peaked at No. 32: regular group lead vocalist Tom Johnston said that "Another Park..." "was doing real well [in single release], and then it got yanked off the radio for the line 'And the radio just seems to bring me down'".

After the second single off What Were Once Vices...: "Eyes of Silver", was a Top 40 shortfall, Warner Bros. resorted to a re-release of the Doobie Brothers inaugural single "Nobody" a 1971 non-charter which in the autumn of 1974 rose into the top 60 before being phased out by the re-release of "Black Water" as an A-side single.

== Album track success/A-side release ==
From 11 September 1974 WROV-AM in Roanoke VA began airing "Black Water" off the album What Were Once Vices... - the Blackwater, a Roanoke River tributary, is a 25-minute drive from Roanoke city center - with listener response so positive as to cause music director Chuck Holloway to opine: "No one was requesting anything else." Hampton Roads broadcaster WQRK-FM was soon also airing "Black Water", and the track's intense regional success came to the attention of Warner Bros. national promotion director Gary Davis causing an A-side single release of "Black Water" in October 1974, five weeks after WROV had begun airing the track ("Song to See You Through", a Tom Johnston composition off What Were Once Vices..., was utilized as B-side). "Black Water" had its first major market breakout in the Twin Cities area, being reported as an add-on by KDWB in the 23 November 1974 issue of Billboard. Reaching No. 1 on the Billboard Hot 100 dated 15 March 1975, "Black Water" is one of the few records by any act released as a B-side to another Hot 100 hit before topping the Hot 100 itself. In the Billboard ranking of Hot 100 hits for the year 1975 "Black Water" would rank at No. 15.

The song is one of several performed by the Doobie Brothers during the band's two episode appearance in 1978 on the ABC sitcom What's Happening!!

== Reception ==
Cash Box praised the song, saying among other things that "trickling, bubbling acoustical guitars and flowing harmonies keep this track running true to course with a fiddle flashing just below the surface." Record World called it "an impressive change of pace item" and said that "spiced with acappella vocals coming out of an acoustic guitar and fiddle mood, it flows nicely." Ultimate Classic Rock critic Michael Gallucci rated "Black Water" as the Doobie Brothers' 3rd greatest song, commenting that it contains "a cappella breakdown, a viola solo and a bunch of acoustic instruments." The staff of Billboard rated it as the Doobie Brothers' 2nd best song, saying that the elements noted by Gallucci plus "a melody that meandered like a lazy, rolling river" made the song sound like you were on the Mississippi River and that the song had a unique sound for its time.

== Personnel ==
- Patrick Simmons – composer, acoustic guitars, lead vocals
- Tom Johnston – backing vocals
- Tiran Porter – bass guitar, backing vocals
- Keith Knudsen – backing vocals, dubbed-in drums
- John Hartman – drums
- Novi Novog – viola
- Arlo Guthrie – autoharp, wind chimes
- Ted Templeman – producer

== Chart performance ==
=== Weekly charts ===
Chart (1974–1975)	Peak position
Australian (Kent Music Report)	22
Canada RPM Top Singles	9
US Billboard Hot 100	1
US Adult Contemporary (Billboard)	38
US Cash Box Top 100	3

=== Year-end charts ===
Chart (1975)	Rank
Canada	91
US Billboard Hot 100	15
US Cash Box	13

== Other versions ==
Garth Brooks recorded "Black Water" for his 2013 multi-CD release Blame It All on My Roots: Five Decades of Influences. The Doobie Brothers remade "Black Water" with the Zac Brown Band for their 2014 album Southbound.
