= Take Me in Your Arms (Rock Me a Little While) =

1965 song written by Holland–Dozier–Holland

- Side A of the Canadian single

Single by Kim Weston
- B-side: "Don't Compare Me with Her"
- Released: September 1965
- Genre: R&B
- Length: 2:55
- Label: Gordy
- Songwriters: Brian Holland, Lamont Dozier, Eddie Holland
- Producers: Brian Holland, Lamont Dozier

Kim Weston singles chronology
"What Good Am I Without You" (1964)	"Take Me in Your Arms (Rock Me a Little While)" (1965)	"Helpless" (1966)

"Take Me in Your Arms (Rock Me a Little While)" is a song written by the premier Motown songwriting/production team of the 1960s Holland–Dozier–Holland. The first hit recording was sung by Kim Weston in 1965. It was most popular in 1975 when it was recorded by the Doobie Brothers.

== Early versions ==
Eddie Holland of Holland-Dozier-Holland made the original recording of "Take Me in Your Arms" in 1964. This version was not released commercially until 2005 on the compilation album A Cellarful of Motown! Volume 2. Holland-Dozier-Holland had Kim Weston record the song in 1965 and her version was released that September. Mike Terry is the baritone sax player. It peaked at number 4 on the R&B chart in Billboard and at number 50 on the Hot 100. In 1967, the Isley Brothers recorded the song. Their version released in March 1968 and bubbled under at number 121 in the U.S. and 22 on the R&B chart.

== The Doobie Brothers version ==
"Take Me in Your Arms (Rock Me)"
- Side A of the US single

Single by The Doobie Brothers

from the album Stampede
- B-side: "Slack Key Soquel Rag"
- Released: April 23, 1975
- Recorded: Fall 1974
- Studio: Warner Bros. Studios, North Hollywood
- Genre: Boogie rock
- Length: 3:42
- Label: Warner Bros.
- Songwriters: Brian Holland, Lamont Dozier, Eddie Holland
- Producer: Ted Templeman

The Doobie Brothers singles chronology
"Black Water" (1974)	"Take Me in Your Arms (Rock Me)" (1975)	"Sweet Maxine" (1975)

Music video
- "Take Me in Your Arms (Rock Me a Little While)" by the Doobie Brothers on YouTube

Official audio
- "Take Me in Your Arms (Rock Me a Little While)" by the Doobie Brothers on YouTube

The Doobie Brothers recorded "Take Me in Your Arms" for their 1975 Stampede album. Tom Johnston, who was then the Doobies' frontman, later recalled, "I had been a fan of that song since it came out somewhere in the '60s. I just loved that song. So somewhere around '72 I started lobbying to get the band to do a cover of that. And I didn't get anywhere until '75. Then finally in 1975 we actually did it."

Doobies member Jeff Baxter said of their recording, "That song was like a dream come true for us. Every musician I've ever known has at some point wanted to achieve Motown's technically slick soul sound - it's so dynamic. We sat down to try to duplicate it, and to see if our version could emerge as a successful single." According to Doobies member Patrick Simmons, "At first the band sounded like the Grateful Dead doing the Four Tops, but gradually it came together quite accurately." Motown veteran Paul Riser was enlisted to arrange the track.

Released as the lead single of Stampede on April 23, 1975, "Take Me in Your Arms" peaked at number 11 on the United States Billboard Hot 100 two months later on the weeks of June 21 and 28. "Take Me in Your Arms" gave the Doobie Brothers their only chart hit in France, where it reached number 37. The track also charted in the UK at number 29, matching the chart peak of the Doobie Brothers' only other original release Top 30 hit "Listen to the Music" (The Doobie Brothers reached number 7 in the UK in 1993 with a remixed version of their 1973 single "Long Train Runnin'") and in Australia at number 34.

== Other notable versions ==
"Take Me in Your Arms" was also released in 1975 by the Canadian singer Charity Brown whose version, produced by Harry Hinde, was arranged by the Motown veteran Tom Baird. The Charity Brown rendering reached number 5 in Canada in May 1975. The song was also recorded by Blood Sweat & Tears on BS&T 4. Brown's single was given a May 1975 release in the UK where it failed to chart. The track appeared on Brown's 1975 self-titled album.

== Chart performance ==
=== Kim Weston ===
Weekly chart performance for "Take Me in Your Arms (Rock Me a Little While)" by Kim Weston
Chart (1965)	Peak position
UK R&B (Record Mirror)	6
US Cashbox Top 100	48
US Billboard Hot 100	50
US Hot R&B/Hip-Hop Songs (Billboard)	4

=== Isley Brothers ===
Weekly chart performance for "Take Me in Your Arms (Rock Me a Little While)" by the Isley Brothers
Chart (1968)	Peak position
US Billboard Bubbling Under the Hot 100	121
US Billboard R&B	22
US Cash Box Top 100	97

=== Charity Brown ===
Weekly chart performance for "Take Me in Your Arms (Rock Me a Little While)" by Charity Brown
Chart (1975)	Peak position
Canada RPM Top Singles	5

Year-end chart performance for "Take Me in Your Arms (Rock Me a Little While)" by Charity Brown
Chart (1975)	Rank
Canada	65

=== Doobie Brothers ===
Weekly chart performance for "Take Me in Your Arms (Rock Me)" by the Doobie Brothers
Chart (1975)	Peak position
Australia (Kent Music Report)	34
Canada RPM Top Singles	35
New Zealand (RIANZ)	31
UK Singles Chart	29
US Billboard Hot 100	11
US Cash Box Top 100	10

Year-end chart performance for "Take Me in Your Arms (Rock Me)" by the Doobie Brothers
Chart (1975)	Rank
United States (Joel Whitburn's Pop Annual)	111
