= Cycles (The Doobie Brothers album) =

Studio album by The Doobie Brothers
- Released: May 17, 1989
- Recorded: 1988
- Studios: The Plant, Sausalito, CA
- Genre: Rock
- Length: 40:22
- Label: Capitol
- Producers: Rodney Mills, Charlie Midnight, Eddie Schwartz

The Doobie Brothers chronology
Farewell Tour (1983)	Cycles (1989)	Brotherhood (1991)

Professional ratings
Review scores
Source	Rating
AllMusic	2/5 stars
The Encyclopedia of Popular Music	3/5 stars
Los Angeles Times	2/5 stars
The Rolling Stone Album Guide	1.5/5 stars

Cycles is the tenth studio album by American rock band The Doobie Brothers. The album was released on May 17, 1989, by Capitol Records.

It marked the band's reunion after breaking up in 1982. Instead of the later configurations with Michael McDonald at the helm, the band reverted to their 1972-1974 lineup although Bobby LaKind who had played percussion with later configurations also rejoined. Tom Johnston, John Hartman and Michael Hossack returned to the lineup for the first time since 1977, 1979 and 1974 respectively.

The album was largely co-written with producers and sidesmen. LaKind collaborated with former Doobie members John McFee and Keith Knudsen on "Time is Here and Gone" and McDonald on "Tonight I'm Coming Through (The Border)". Two cover versions were included in the form of the Four Tops' "One Chain (Don't Make No Prison)" and the Isley Brothers' "Need a Little Taste of Love."

The title of the album was taken from an unused song written by Tiran Porter. Porter later recorded the song for his 1995 solo album Playing To An Empty House.

Lead track "The Doctor" was released as a single and stormed to No. 9 on Billboard's Hot 100 and No. 1 on the Mainstream Rock Chart. After this album, LaKind retired from the band because of terminal colorectal cancer, which claimed his life in 1992.

== Reception ==
Spin said, "Cycles lacks the solid-gold inlay of their past productions — the Rolls-Royce of American Bar Bands sounds more like a subcompact. The bulk of the work is quietly forgettable — just another audio colorization, another 70s group with 80s drum samples, digital reverb and hi-gain guitar."

== Reissue ==
The album was reissued in 2002 by One Way Records with two bonus tracks. The first was "Anything for Love", written by LaKind with Eddie Schwartz and Zeke Zirngiebel, which originally appeared on a CD single of "The Doctor". The second was an extended remix of "Need a Little Taste of Love," which had appeared on a CD single of "One Chain".

== Track listing ==
No.	Title	Writer(s)	Lead vocals	Length
1.	"The Doctor"	Tom Johnston, Charlie Midnight, Eddie Schwartz	Tom Johnston	3:47
2.	"One Chain (Don't Make No Prison)"	Dennis Lambert, Brian Potter	Johnston	4:03
3.	"Take Me to the Highway"	Patrick Simmons, Dale Ockerman, Tom Fedele, Midnight, Schwartz	Patrick Simmons	3:21
4.	"South of the Border"	Johnston	Johnston	4:23
5.	"Time Is Here and Gone"	Bobby LaKind, John McFee, Keith Knudsen	Johnston	3:52
6.	"Need a Little Taste of Love"	Marvin Isley, Ernie Isley, Ronald Isley, O'Kelly Isley, Rudolph Isley, Chris Jasper	Johnston	4:07
7.	"I Can Read Your Mind"	Simmons, Ockerman, Chris Thompson	Simmons	4:29
8.	"Tonight I'm Coming Through (The Border)"	LaKind, Michael McDonald	Johnston	4:29
9.	"Wrong Number"	Johnston	Johnston	4:09
10.	"Too High a Price"	LaKind, Zeke Zirngeibel, John Herron	Simmons	4:13
Total length:				40:22

== Personnel ==
The Doobie Brothers

- Tom Johnston – guitar, vocals
- Patrick Simmons – guitar, vocals
- Tiran Porter – bass, backing vocals
- John Hartman – drums, backing vocals
- Michael Hossack – drums, percussion
- Bobby LaKind – percussion, backing vocals

Additional musicians

- Bill Payne – keyboards
- Dave Tyson – keyboards
- Kim Bullard – keyboards
- Dale Ockerman – keyboards
- Phil Aaberg – keyboards
- Don Frank – electronic drums
- The Memphis Horns – horns
  - Wayne Jackson
  - Andrew Love
- Rem Smiers – keytar
- Shannon Eigsti – keyboards (3) (uncredited) (Note: Shannon Eigsti was a young pianist who met the Doobie Brothers when she was a patient at a children's hospital, dying of Ewing sarcoma. According to Patrick Simmons, she would play along with the band when they played at the hospital, and even once joined them at a live date nearby. After she expressed a desire to play on a record, the band arranged for her to record the keyboard part on "Take Me to the Highway" in her hospital room. The album credits include a dedication to her, but she was mistakenly not credited for playing. She died at age 17 in 1988, before the album was released.)

Technical personnel

- Rodney Mills – producer, engineer, additional production (1, 3, 5, 9)
- Charlie Midnight – producer (1, 3, 5, 9)
- Eddie Schwartz – producer (1, 3, 5, 9)
- Devon Bernadoni – co-engineer
- Jim Gaines – additional engineer
- Tom Sadzeck – additional engineer
- Jeffery Norman – additional engineer
- Bob Ludwig – mastering
- Brian Wayy – remixing, programming

Artistic personnel

- Suzanne Rubin – photo coordination, styling
- Joyce Ravid – photography
- Ellen Roebuck – art coordination
- Tom Nikosey – logo design
- Tom Keller – cover photography
- Tommy Steele – art direction
- Jeffery Fey – design

== Charts ==
=== Weekly charts ===
Chart (1989)	Peak position
Australian Albums (ARIA)	44
Canada Top Albums/CDs (RPM)	8
Dutch Albums (Album Top 100)	69
New Zealand Albums (RMNZ)	32
US Billboard 200	17

=== Year-end charts ===
Chart (1989)	Position
Canada Top Albums/CDs (RPM)	51
US Billboard 200	90
