= Long Train Runnin' =

1973 single by the Doobie Brothers

- Side A of US single

Single by the Doobie Brothers

from the album The Captain and Me
- B-side: "Without You"
- Released: March 28, 1973
- Recorded: 1972–1973
- Studio: Warner Bros. Studios, North Hollywood, California
- Genre: Country rock; Southern rock; boogie rock; pop rock
- Length: 3:27
- Label: Warner Bros.
- Songwriter: Tom Johnston
- Producer: Ted Templeman

The Doobie Brothers singles chronology
"Jesus Is Just Alright" (1972)	"Long Train Runnin'" (1973)	"China Grove" (1973)

Official audio
- "Long Train Runnin'" on YouTube

"Long Train Runnin'" (or "Long Train Running") is a song recorded by American rock band the Doobie Brothers and written by band member Tom Johnston. It was included on the band's third album, The Captain and Me (1973), and was released as a single by Warner Bros., becoming a hit and peaking at No. 8 on the US Billboard Hot 100.

It was covered by the Italian band Traks in 1982, and then by the British girl group Bananarama in 1991. In 1993, the Doobie Brothers' version was remixed and charted again in several countries, including reaching No. 7 on the UK Singles Chart.

== Origin ==
The tune evolved from an untitled and mostly ad-libbed jam that the Doobies developed onstage years before it was finally recorded. Its working title, according to Johnston, was "Rosie Pig Moseley" and later "Osborn". "I didn't want to cut it," Johnston later confessed. "...I just considered it a bar song without a lot of merit. Teddy [Templeman], on the other hand, thought it had some." Templeman convinced Johnston to write words to the song.

Johnston performed the lead vocal and the rhythmic guitar strumming that propels the song and also performs the harmonica solo.

== Reception ==
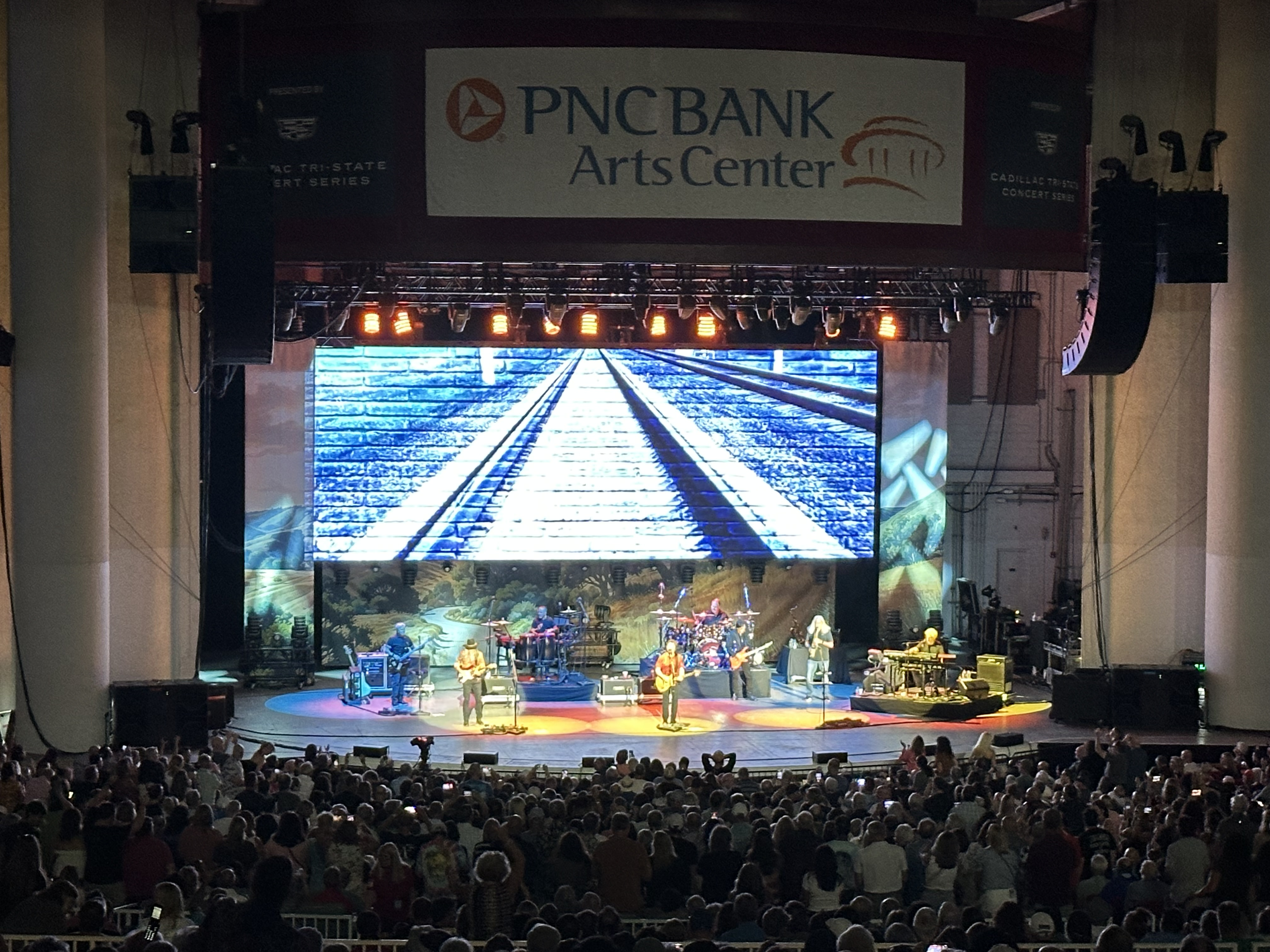
The Doobie Brothers, led by writer Tom Johnston (center, at microphone stand), performing "Long Train Runnin'" in 2025

Billboard magazine described it as "good-timey, good-harmony AM cooker." Cash Box named it one of the Picks of the Week, praising the Doobies' "fine harmony and musical prowess." Record World said that the "pulsating rocker should take the honors in 1973." Upon the release of the 1993 remix, Charles Aaron from Spin wrote, "This early-'70s, blue-eyed R&B annoyance always had a hair-raising guitar break (copied by X on 'True Love Pt. #2'), and the raving remix recasts it as the sinuously funky friend you never knew you missed. The harp bite is a setup, along with traces of the proto-techno intro to Sweet's 'Fox on the Run'."

Ultimate Classic Rock critic Michael Gallucci rated "Long Train Runnin'" the Doobie Brothers' second-greatest song, especially praising the guitar riff. The staff of Billboard rated it as the Doobie Brothers' sixth-best song, noting how Johnston's and Patrick Simmons' "punchy guitars" contrast with "the jammy polyrhythms" in the bass and drums.

== Personnel ==
- Tom Johnston – lead guitar, harmonica, ARP synthesizer, vocals
- Patrick Simmons – guitar, ARP synthesizer, vocals
- Tiran Porter – bass, vocals
- John Hartman – drums, percussion, vocals
- Michael Hossack – drums, congas, timbales

== Charts ==
=== Original release ===
==== Weekly charts ====
Chart (1973)	Peak position
Australia (Kent Music Report)	58
Canada Adult Contemporary (RPM)	20
Canada Top Singles (RPM)	8
Netherlands (Dutch Top 40)	12
Netherlands (Single Top 100)	10
New Zealand (Listener)	15
South Africa (Springbok Radio)	11
US Billboard Hot 100	8

==== Year-end charts ====
Chart (1973)	Position
Canada Top Singles (RPM)	85
US Billboard Year-End	41

=== Remixes ===
==== Weekly charts ====
Chart (1993–1994)	Peak position
Australia (ARIA)	67
Belgium (Ultratop 50 Flanders)	32
Europe (Eurochart Hot 100)	32
Europe (European Dance Radio)	16
Europe (European Hit Radio)	30
Finland (Suomen virallinen lista)	15
Germany (GfK)	64
Ireland (IRMA)	14
UK Singles (Official Charts)	7
UK Airplay (Music Week)	3
UK Dance (Music Week)	1
UK Club Chart (Music Week)	6

==== Year-end charts ====
Chart (1993)	Position
UK Singles (OCC)	90
UK Club Chart (Music Week)	52

=== Other reissues ===
Chart (2011)	Peak position
France (SNEP)	91

Chart (2013)	Peak position
France (SNEP)	104

== Certifications ==
Region	Certification	Certified units/sales
New Zealand (RMNZ)	3× Platinum	90,000^{‡}
Spain (Promusicae)	Gold	30,000^{‡}
United Kingdom (BPI)	Gold	400,000^{‡}
^{‡} Sales+streaming figures based on certification alone.

== Traks version ==
"Long Train Runnin'"

Single by Traks

from the album Long Train Runnin'
- B-side: "Drums Power"
- Released: August 1982
- Genre: Disco
- Length: 3:30; 7:02 (album version)
- Label: Polydor; Savoir-Faire
- Songwriter: Tom Johnston
- Producer: Traks

Traks singles chronology
"Long Train Runnin'" (1982)	"Get Ready" (1983)

Music video
- "Long Train Runnin' " on YouTube

In 1982, Italian band Traks covered the song. This version charted in France and in West Germany, where it peaked at No. 62 and No. 18, respectively.

=== Track listing ===
- 7" single Polydor 2040 365
1. "Long Train Runnin'" (short version) – 3:30
2. "Drums Power" – 4:27

=== Charts ===
Chart (1982)	Peak position
France (IFOP)	62
West Germany (GfK)	18

== Bananarama version ==
"Long Train Running"

Single by Bananarama

from the album Pop Life
- B-side: "Outta Sight"
- Released: April 8, 1991
- Genre: Dance-pop
- Length: 3:31
- Label: London
- Songwriter: Tom Johnston
- Producer: Youth

Bananarama singles chronology
"Preacher Man" (1990)	"Long Train Running" (1991)	"Tripping on Your Love" (1991)

Music video
- "Long Train Running" on YouTube

The English pop trio Bananarama's version of "Long Train Runnin'" appeared on their fifth studio album, Pop Life (1991), and was released as the album's third single in the UK in April 1991 by London Records. The group discovered the song when they were browsing through the record collection of Youth, producer of the Pop Life album. They needed one more tune to complete Pop Life and decided to go with a cover. The song reached No. 6 in Israel, No. 10 in Portugal, No. 18 in Ireland and No. 30 in the UK.

=== Critical reception ===
Larry Flick from Billboard magazine wrote, "Bananarama offers a pop/house version of the Doobie Brothers' classic rocker [...]. Produced by Youth, this first single from the forthcoming Pop Life album features guitar work from the Gipsy Kings, which provides a tough, rustic edge to an otherwise light and campy track. A fun one that could cross into radio territory." Chuck Eddy from Entertainment Weekly said that "those techno-flamenco gods" help engineer the song "into a scary locomotive blues." Everett True from Melody Maker commented, "They have a new single out. They've thought up a new, crap, out-of-time dance routine and they're gonna have another hit. All in all, Bananarama give this rather chaotic world a reassuring sense of order, don't they?"

=== Music video ===
The Bananarama music video for "Long Train Running", directed by British visual design artist and director Nick Egan, features the group members dressed in Spanish gowns while attending a soirée with various guests at a castle. Scenes at a decorated dining table alternate with shots from bedrooms.

=== Track listing ===
- UK CD single NANCD 24
1. "Long Train Running" (radio version) – 3:31
  Remixed by Mark 'Spike' Stent
2. "Long Train Running" (Alma De Noche Mix) – 6:40
  Remixed by Mark 'Spike' Stent
3. "Long Train Running" (Flamenco CD Mix) – 4:57
4. "Outta Sight" – 4:30

=== Charts ===
Weekly chart performance for "Long Train Runnin'"
Chart (1991)	Peak position
Australia (ARIA)	179
Europe (Eurochart Hot 100)	64
Europe (European Airplay Top 50)	43
Europe (European Hit Radio)	15
Belgium (Ultratop 50 Flanders)	47
Finland (Suomen virallinen lista)	13
Germany (GfK)	45
Ireland (IRMA)	18
Israel (IBA)	6
Luxembourg (Radio Luxembourg)	12
Portugal (AFP)	10
UK Singles (Official Charts)	30
UK Airplay (Music Week)	11
UK Dance (Music Week)	57

=== Release history ===
Region	Date	Format(s)	Label(s)	Ref.
United Kingdom	April 8, 1991	7-inch vinyl; 12-inch vinyl; CD; cassette	London	
United Kingdom	May 7, 1991	10-inch vinyl	London	
Japan	May 10, 1991	Mini-CD	London	
Japan	May 25, 1991	CD	London	
Australia	July 8, 1991	CD; cassette	London	
