= Sibling Rivalry (The Doobie Brothers album) =

Studio album by The Doobie Brothers
- Released: October 3, 2000
- Recorded: 1999–2000
- Genre: Rock
- Length: 60:01
- Label: Pyramid, Rhino
- Producer: Guy Allison, Terry Nelson, The Doobie Brothers

The Doobie Brothers chronology
Rockin' Down the Highway: The Wildlife Concert (1996)	Sibling Rivalry (2000)	Divided Highway (2003)

Professional ratings
Review scores
Source	Rating
AllMusic	3/5 stars
The Encyclopedia of Popular Music	3/5 stars
The New Rolling Stone Album Guide	1/5 stars

Sibling Rivalry is the twelfth studio album by American rock band The Doobie Brothers. The album was released on October 3, 2000, by Pyramid Records and Rhino Entertainment.

The album was the band's first studio recording since Brotherhood, in 1991. It was also the only Doobie Brothers studio album to feature a lead vocal by multi-instrumentalist John McFee and full lead vocals by drummer Keith Knudsen, both of whom had rejoined the group in 1993 after an eleven-year absence.

The group photograph in the inner booklet featured touring sidesmen Guy Allison (keyboards, backing vocals), Marc Russo (saxophone) and Skylark (bass, backing vocals). Allison and Russo also featured on the album, the former co-writing three tracks while occasional touring bassist John Cowan also featured and contributed the song "Can't Stand to Lose", written with Poco's Rusty Young.

== Critical reception ==
The New Rolling Stone Album Guide wrote that the band were "struggling vainly to put their formula to work again ... [Michael] McDonald wisely stayed far away." The Vancouver Sun deemed the album "vintage soft rock, but not an entirely painful experience."

== Track listing ==
No.	Title	Writer(s)	Vocals	Length
1.	"People Gotta Love Again"	Tom Johnston	Johnston	4:48
2.	"Leave My Heartache Behind"	Patrick Simmons	Simmons	3:54
3.	"Ordinary Man"	Bob Bangerter, Michael Ruff, Neida Bequette	Simmons	4:00
4.	"Jericho"	Johnston	Johnston	5:04
5.	"On Every Corner"	Keith Knudsen, Zeke Zirngiebel	Knudsen	4:11
6.	"Angels of Madness"	Guy Allison, Michael Hossack, John McFee	McFee	4:40
7.	"45th Floor"	Bill Champlin, Johnston	Johnston	5:09
8.	"Can't Stand to Lose"	John Cowan, Rusty Young	Simmons	3:56
9.	"Higher Ground"	Bill Champlin, Tamara Champlin, Johnston	Johnston	4:19
10.	"Gates of Eden"	Allison, Knudsen	Knudsen	4:59
11.	"Don't Be Afraid"	Simmons, Cris Sommer-Simmons, Bangerter	Simmons	5:47
12.	"Rocking Horse"	Allison, Knudsen	Johnston	6:27
13.	"Five Corners"	McFee, Simmons	instrumental	1:52

Japan bonus track
No.	Title	Writer(s)	Vocals	Length
14.	"Little Bitty Pretty One"	Bobby Day	Johnston	4:42

== Personnel ==
The Doobie Brothers

- Tom Johnston – guitars, vocals
- Patrick Simmons – guitars, banjo, vocals
- John McFee – guitars, dobro, pedal steel guitar, harmonica, violin, mandolin, vocals
- Keith Knudsen – drums, percussion, vocals
- Michael Hossack – drums, percussion

Additional personnel

- Guy Allison – keyboards, background vocals
- Mario Cippolina – bass on 1 & 9
- John Cowan – bass on 2
- George Hawkins Jr – bass on 5, 10 & 12
- Bob Bangerter – acoustic rhythm guitar on 3 & 11
- Marc Russo – horn, saxophone
- Chris Thompson – backing vocals on 5, 10 & 12
- Maxayn Lewis – background vocals on 4 & 9
- Yvonne Williams – background vocals on 4 & 9
- Bill Champlin – background vocals on 5 & 9
- Cris Sommer-Simmons – background vocals on 11
- Lil' Patrick Harley Simmons – background vocals on 11

== Production ==
- Producers: Guy Allison, Terry Nelson, The Doobie Brothers
- Production coordination: Terry Nelson
- Engineers: Guy Allison, John McFee, Lynn Peterson, Dave Russell, Terry Nelson
- Assistant engineer: Steve Genewick
- Mixing: Steve Genewick, Joe Peccerillo, Elliot Scheiner
- Mastering: Ted Jensen
- Recorder: Terry Nelson
- House sound: Terry Nelson
- Arranger: Guy Allison
- Creative consultant: Josh Leo
- Cover art: Stanley Mouse
- Art Director: Michael A. Beck
