= Keith Knudsen =

American musician (1948–2005)

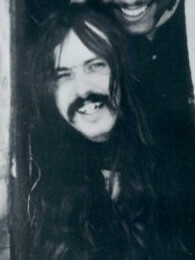
- Knudsen as part of the Doobie Brothers in 1974

Background information
- Born: Keith A. Knudsen; February 18, 1948; Le Mars, Iowa, U.S.
- Died: February 8, 2005 (aged 56) Kentfield, California, U.S.
- Genres: Rock; Country rock; Southern rock
- Occupations: Musician; songwriter
- Instruments: Drums; vocals

Keith A. Knudsen (/kəˈnuːdsən/ kə-NOOD-sən; February 18, 1948 – February 8, 2005) was an American rock drummer, vocalist, and songwriter. Knudsen was best known as a drummer and vocalist for The Doobie Brothers. In addition, he founded the band Southern Pacific with fellow Doobie Brother John McFee. He was posthumously inducted into the Rock and Roll Hall of Fame as a member of The Doobie Brothers in 2020.

== Biography ==
Knudsen was born in Le Mars, Iowa. He began drumming while attending Princeton High School in Princeton, Illinois, where he graduated in 1966. After short stints playing in a club band and the Blind Joe Mendlebaum Blues Band, he became the drummer for organist/vocalist Lee Michaels. He played in The Hoodoo Rhythm Devils from late 1972 through mid 1973. He never participated in any formal studio recording with them, but recorded a live Texas Special on KSAN-FM in San Francisco with the Hoodoos and Johnny Winter. His big break came in 1973 when he was invited to join The Doobie Brothers, replacing the departing Michael Hossack. Knudsen joined the band during the recording of the 1974 Top 10 platinum album, What Were Once Vices Are Now Habits. He made his recording debut with the Doobies on that album in 1974, performing backing vocals over instrumental tracks that included Hossack.

Knudsen did not get behind the drum kit in the recording studio until Stampede in 1975. Knudsen was co-drummer with John Hartman, (and later, Chet McCracken) until the Doobies disbanded in 1982. His contribution to the group's vocal harmonies in the studio and in concert was as crucial as his drumming.

After the Doobies disbanded in 1982, Knudsen and fellow Doobie John McFee formed the country rock band Southern Pacific. The group was successful in the country charts but disbanded in the early 1990s. By then, the two men had formed a writing partnership and despite not rejoining the group at that time, co-wrote the song Time Is Here And Gone with Doobies' percussionist Bobby LaKind, featured on the Doobies reunion album Cycles in 1989.

Knudsen organized a one-off Doobies reunion in 1987 to raise funds for the National Veterans Foundation. After Southern Pacific folded, both he and McFee rejoined the Doobie Brothers on a full-time basis in 1993. Ironically, Knudsen found himself drumming alongside Michael Hossack, whom he had once replaced. Of the multiple pairings of Doobie Brothers drummers over the decades, Knudsen's partnership with Hossack lasted the longest.

He featured prominently as a songwriter on the album Sibling Rivalry (2000). He also featured on the albums Rockin' Down the Highway: The Wildlife Concert (1996), and Live at Wolf Trap (2004). In 2005, he played drums on Emmylou Harris "Shores Of White Sand" off her All I Intend To Be album.

Though Knudsen was a frequent backing vocalist for the Doobie Brothers, he did not sing lead on many released Doobies tracks. On "Double Dealin' Four Flusher" (from Stampede) he is heard trading brief lead vocal lines with Pat Simmons and Tom Johnston. (The box set Long Train Runnin': 1970–2000 has an early rehearsal version of this song, called "Shuffle," with vocals only by Simmons and Knudsen.) Knudsen can also be heard singing lead on songs from the 1982 Doobie Brothers Farewell Tour ("Don't Start Me To Talkin'" from Farewell Tour; "Listen To The Music" from Live at the Greek Theatre 1982). Sibling Rivalry features two later, and very different sounding, Knudsen lead vocals.

Knudsen died of pneumonia at a rehabilitation hospital in Kentfield, California, at the age of 56. He was living in Sonoma County with his wife, artist Kate Knudsen, and his daughter, Dayna Keyes, a radio disc jockey and voiceover actor, at the time of his death.

== Discography ==
=== With the Doobie Brothers (studio albums) ===
- What Were Once Vices Are Now Habits (1974) (US #4)
- Stampede (1975) (US #4)
- Takin' It to the Streets (1976) (US #8)
- Livin' on the Fault Line (1977) (US #10)
- Minute by Minute (1978) (US #1)
- One Step Closer (1980) (US #3)
- Sibling Rivalry (2000)

=== With Southern Pacific ===
- Southern Pacific (1985)
- Killbilly Hill (1986)
- Zuma (1988)
- County Line (1989)
