= Listen to the Music =

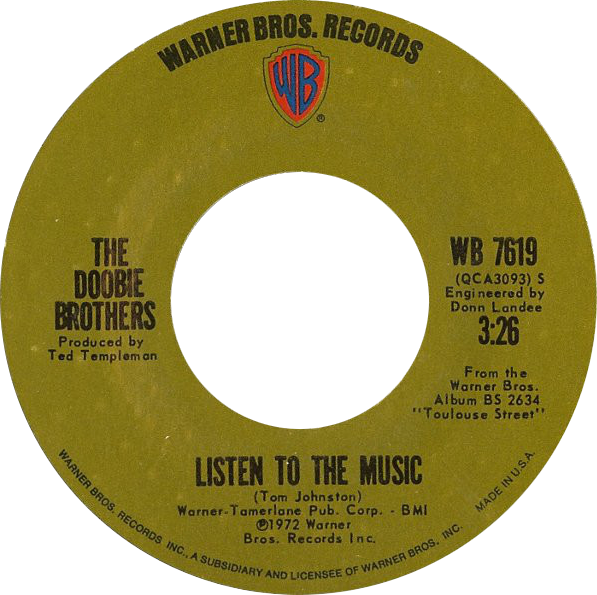
- Side A of the US single

Single by the Doobie Brothers

from the album Toulouse Street
- B-side: "Toulouse Street"
- Released: July 19, 1972
- Recorded: 1971–1972
- Studio: Warner Bros., North Hollywood, California
- Genre: Rock
- Length: 4:44 (album version); 3:47 (single edit); 3:26 (45 version)
- Label: Warner Bros.
- Songwriter: Tom Johnston
- Producer: Ted Templeman

The Doobie Brothers singles chronology
"Nobody" (1971)	"Listen to the Music" (1972)	"Jesus Is Just Alright" (1972)

Music video
- "Listen to the Music" on YouTube

"Listen to the Music" is a song by American rock band the Doobie Brothers, released on their second album, Toulouse Street (1972). The song was written by Tom Johnston and was the band’s first major hit. In 1994, it received a remix by Steve Rodway a.k.a. Motiv8, which eventually peaked at No. 37 in the UK and No. 3 in Iceland.

== Background ==
Writer Tom Johnston described the inspiration for the song as a call for world peace:

"The chord structure of it made me think of something positive, so the lyrics that came out of that were based on this utopian idea that if the leaders of the world got together on some grassy hill somewhere and either smoked enough dope or just sat down and just listened to the music and forgot about all this other bullshit, the world would be a much better place. It was very utopian and very unrealistic (laughs). It seemed like a good idea at the time."

The studio recording used both a banjo and a prominent flanging effect, audible from the bridge until the fadeout. When released as a single by Warner Bros. Records, the song peaked at number 11 on the Billboard Hot 100 in November 1972.

The commercial success of "Listen to the Music" helped the album Toulouse Street rise on the charts. The song remains a staple of adult contemporary and classic rock radio. The band also uses it as an encore song during live shows. Patrick Simmons, the second guitarist and vocalist in the group, sings the bridge of the song.

Upon the release of the single, Cash Box said that it's "the group's mellowest rockin' mood yet; one that could see them through to chart territory with AM play."

Ultimate Classic Rock critic Michael Gallucci rated "Listen to the Music" as the Doobie Brothers fourth-greatest song, praising the smooth, "soft, shuffling rhythm" and Johnston's vocal performance. The staff of Billboard rated it even higher, considering it the Doobie Brothers' best song, saying that it "ranks high in the pantheon of rock n’ roll feel-good hits" and should "get your foot tapping and bring a bit of a smile to your face."

In June 2020, four members of the band released an acoustic version of the song on YouTube, with each performing from his home during the COVID-19 pandemic; the recording included a more prominent banjo part, but no lead electric guitar or drums. At the end of the recording, lead singer Tom Johnston noted that it was a benefit performance, of sorts, for Feeding America, and gave the organization's URL, encouraging fans to donate.

== Personnel ==
=== The Doobie Brothers ===
- Tom Johnston – lead vocals, backing vocals, guitars
- Patrick Simmons – lead vocals (bridge), backing vocals, guitars, banjo
- Tiran Porter – backing vocals, bass
- John (Little John) Hartman – drums, tambourine
- Michael Hossack – drums, steel drums

=== Additional personnel ===
- Ted Templeman – percussion

== Charts ==
=== Weekly charts ===
Chart (1972–1974)	Peak position
Australian (Kent Music Report)	50
Belgium	27
Canada Top Singles (RPM)	3
Ireland (IRMA)	23
Netherlands (Single Top 100)	7
UK Singles (Official Charts)	29
US Billboard Hot 100	11
US Cash Box Top 100	9

Chart (1994)	Peak position
Iceland (Íslenski Listinn Topp 40)	3
UK Singles (OCC)	37
UK Airplay (Music Week)	38
UK Club Chart (Music Week)	29

=== Year-end charts ===
Chart (1972)	Rank
Canada Top Singles (RPM)	22
US Opus	78
US (Joel Whitburn's Pop Annual)	102

Chart (1994)	Rank
Iceland (Íslenski Listinn Topp 40)	48

== Certifications ==
Region	Certification	Certified units/sales
New Zealand (RMNZ)	8× Platinum	240,000^{‡}
United Kingdom (BPI)	Gold	400,000^{‡}
^{‡} Sales+streaming figures based on certification alone.

== Cover versions ==
"Listen to the Music" was covered by Sonny & Cher on their 1973 LP Mama Was a Rock and Roll Singer, Papa Used to Write All Her Songs, and by The Isley Brothers on their 1973 LP 3 + 3. The song was also copied and used as the theme song of All India Radio FM in 1996 sung by Shibani Kashyap.
