= Tom Johnston (musician) =

American musician (born 1948)

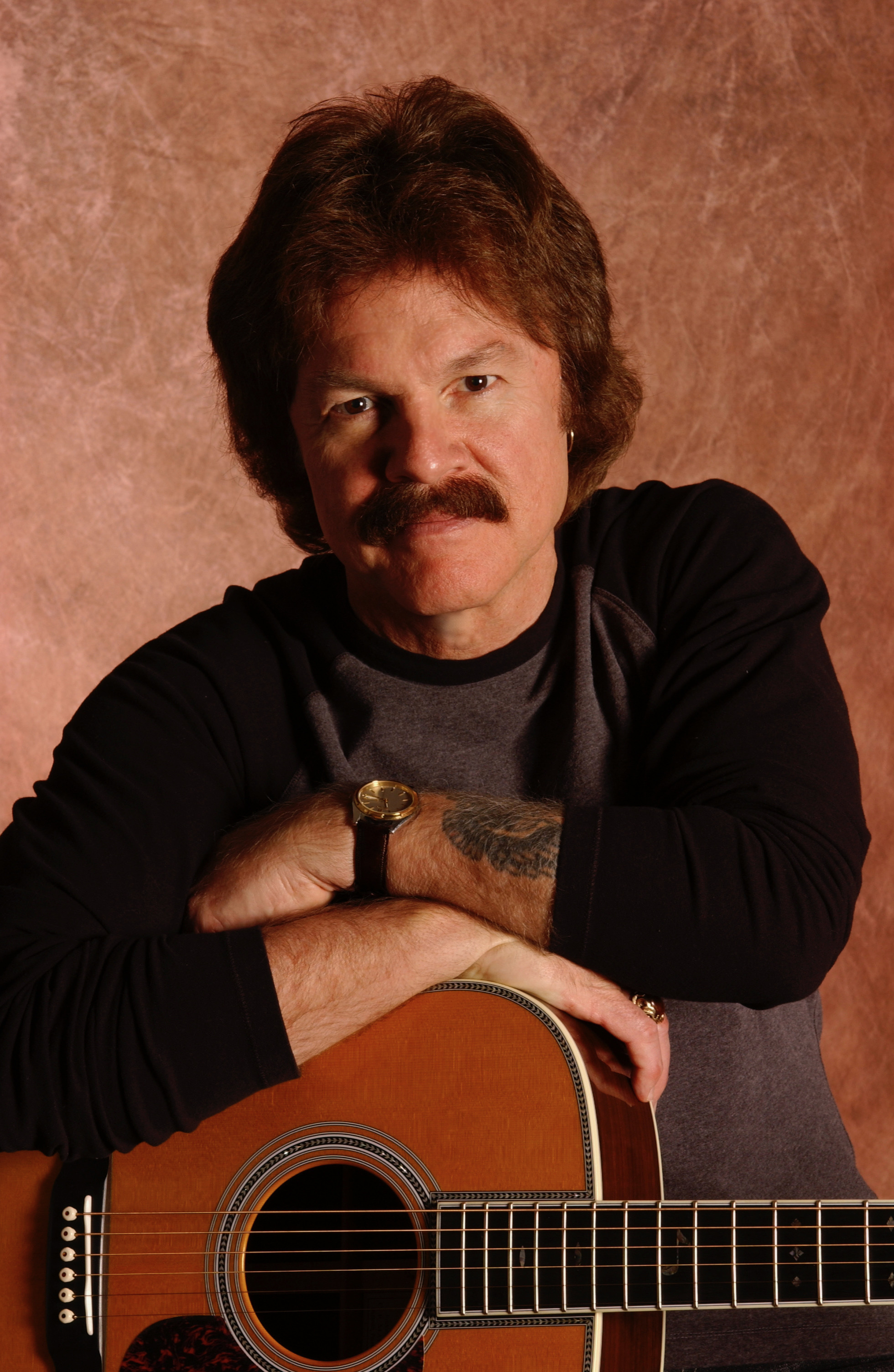
- Johnston in 2000

Background information
- Born: Charles Thomas Johnston; August 15, 1948 (age 78); Visalia, California, U.S.
- Genre: Rock
- Occupations: Musician; songwriter
- Instruments: Vocals; guitar; harmonica; keyboards
- Years active: 1970–present
- Labels: Warner Bros.; Elektra
- Website: doobiebros.com

Charles Thomas Johnston (born August 15, 1948) is an American musician. He is a guitarist and vocalist, known principally as a founder, guitarist, lead vocalist and songwriter for the rock group the Doobie Brothers, as well as for his own solo career. He has played off and on with the Doobie Brothers for 50 years, in several styles.

Johnston is most well known for both his lead guitar and vocal role in the Doobie Brothers, as well as for his adaptation of his own acoustic guitar style, blending a unique strum and percussive accented rhythm at the same time on one instrument. This style, interwoven with melodic hammer-ons, gave Johnston an early signature sound in popular 1970s rock music. All the rhythm structures behind "Long Train Runnin'" and "Listen to the Music" were formulated first for an acoustic guitar, and then re-applied in similar style on an electric guitar. He was inducted into the Rock and Roll Hall of Fame as a member of the Doobie Brothers in 2020.

== Early life ==
Johnston was born in Visalia, California. His greatest musical influences during his youth included Little Richard, Bo Diddley, Elvis Presley, James Brown, and other rhythm and blues artists featured on the radio in the 1950s. After brief school stints with the saxophone and clarinet, at the age of twelve Johnston took up guitar. He said, "I started out [on] the clarinet at seven, and I played that for eight years. I also played the saxophone for three years, drums for a year and a half, and took up the guitar when I was in the seventh grade. That was pretty much of a rebellion/image trip. But I felt at home on the guitar. I loved the saxophone and played tenor and baritone. But unfortunately, when I hung the clarinet up, I hung up all the reed instruments and just started playing guitar, and I never touched them again. I taught myself guitar and a little piano at home. I played piano on the first album The Doobie Brothers, and a little harmonica on a few others."

In his early career he played in a variety of bands, including a Mexican wedding band that played half soul and half Latin music. His interest in rhythm and blues led to his singing in a soul group from a neighboring town and, eventually, his own blues band.

[re: San Jose, 12th Street House] I was 22 at the time and I was paying the rent and having the time of my life. I was a happy camper in those days.

— Source Interview: Michael Cimino, CottageViews, January 31, 2001

Johnston moved to San Jose to finish college and started playing in bands around town. It was there that he met Skip Spence, a former drummer with Jefferson Airplane, and guitarist/founding member of a group that had a major influence on the Doobie Brothers – Moby Grape. Spence introduced Johnston to John Hartman. Johnston was a graphic design art major at San José State University and wound up living at 285 South 12th Street, which was a musical center for San Jose at the time.

== Career ==
=== The Doobie Brothers (1970–1976) ===
Johnston and Hartman soon formed their own band, Pud, featuring Greg Murphy on bass. Pud played many clubs in and around San Jose, including the Golden Horn Lounge (which no longer exists) in Cupertino, California. Here they met Pat Simmons. Hartman and Johnston lived in the 12th Street house for about four years; whereupon Dave Shogren joined them to replace Greg Murphy and Pat Simmons was recruited, they had the nucleus of a new band, and Pud gave way to the Doobie Brothers.

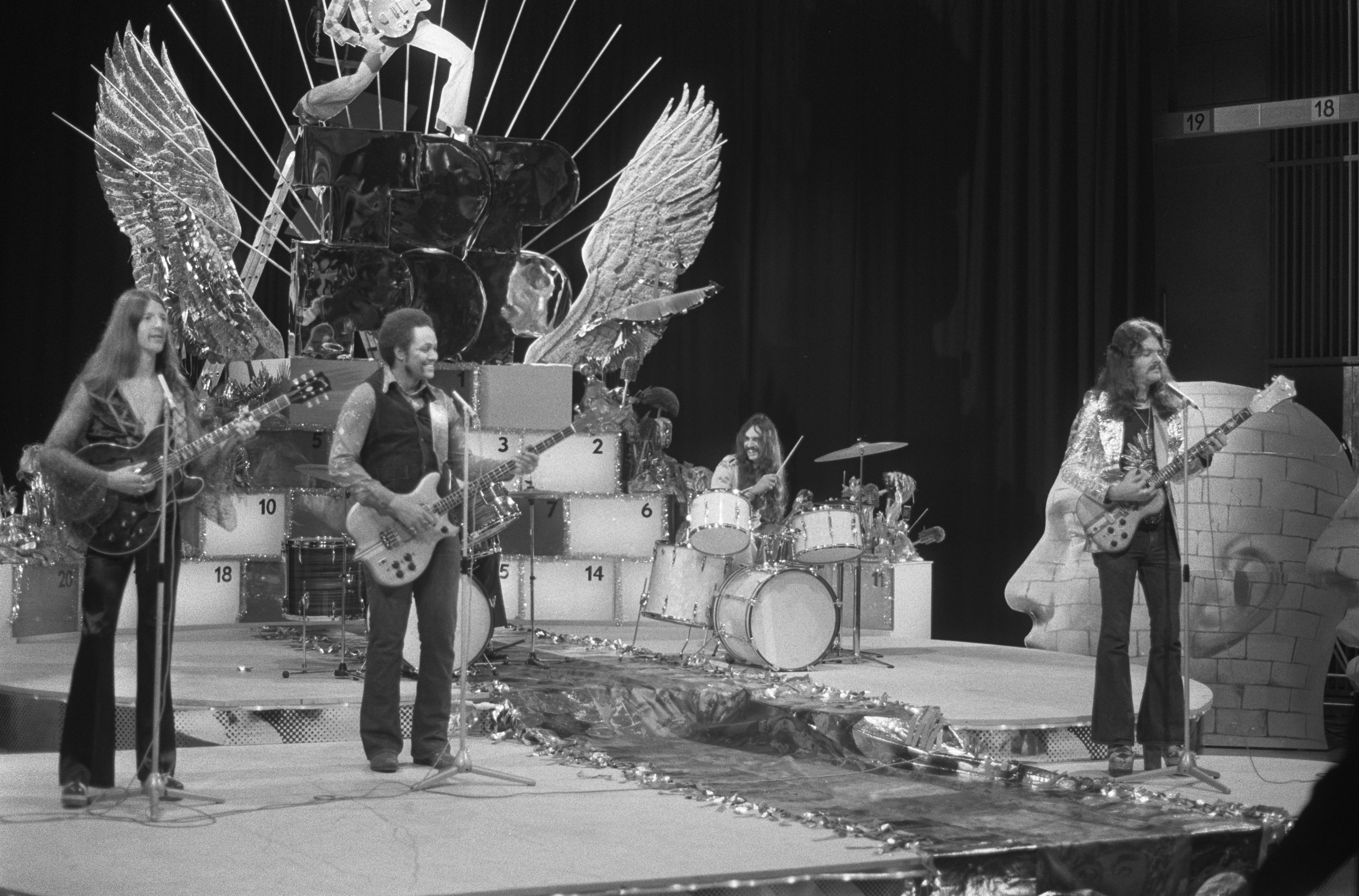
Johnston (far right) and the Doobie Brothers performing on the television show “TopPop” in 1974.

Throughout much of an initial seven-year and six-album discography, Johnston wrote and sang many of the Doobie Brothers' early hits, including "Listen to the Music" (#11 Top 100 Billboard Hit −1972), "Rockin' Down the Highway," "China Grove" (#15 Billboard Hot 100 Hit), "Long Train Runnin'" (#8 Billboard Hot 100 Hit), "Another Park, Another Sunday" (#32 Billboard Hot 100 Hit), and "Eyes of Silver" (#52 Billboard Hot 100 Hit). He also sang the hit song "Take Me in Your Arms" (#11 Billboard Hot 100 Hit −1975) (written by Holland-Dozier-Holland).

=== Mid and solo years (1976–1987) ===
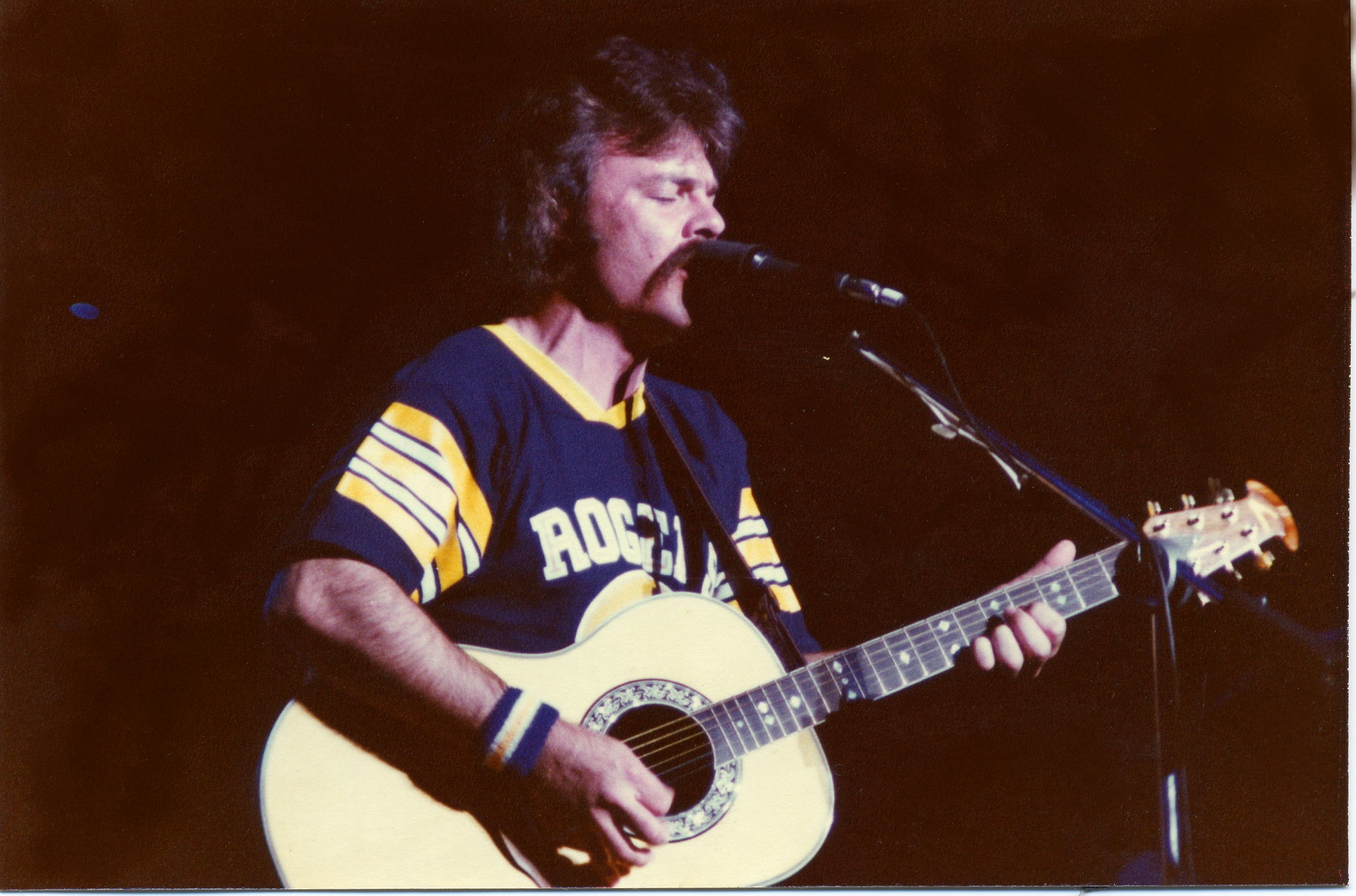
Tommy Johnston Toys for Tots Concert Atlanta, Georgia Dec 1980

In December 1973, the British music magazine NME reported the relatively trivial news that Johnston had been arrested in California on a charge of marijuana possession. More seriously however, following years of a road touring lifestyle and health issues surrounding stomach ulcers which stood as a challenge since high school, Johnston became severely ill on the eve of a major tour beginning in Memphis, Tennessee in 1975 to promote Stampede. Johnston's condition was so precarious that he required emergency hospitalization for a bleeding ulcer. With Johnston convalescing and the tour already underway, fellow Doobie Brother Jeff Baxter proposed recruiting a fellow Steely Dan alum to fill the hole. This led to the emergency hiring of Michael McDonald, who became the lead singer of the band. Restored to fitness in 1976 and briefly back in the band, Johnston contributed one original song to Takin' It to the Streets ("Turn It Loose"), and also added a vocal cameo to Pat Simmons' tune "Wheels of Fortune". He also made live appearances with the band in 1976 (appearing in a concert filmed that year at Winterland in San Francisco, excerpts from which appear occasionally on VH1 Classic), but was sidelined once again in the fall due to exhaustion. None of Johnston's songs appeared on Livin' on the Fault Line, though he had written and the band had recorded five of his compositions for the album. Finally, before Fault Line was released, Johnston had his songs removed and left the band that he co-founded (though he received credit for guitars and vocals and was pictured on the album's inner sleeve band photo). After a few years of restored health but growing differences in musical direction between band members, Johnston finally left the band in 1977 to pursue a solo career that produced two albums with Warner Bros.: Everything You've Heard Is True and Still Feels Good (reissued on compact disc by Wounded Bird Records), and Billboard Hot 100 hit "Savannah Nights" (#34 Top 100 Billboard Hit −1980).

Johnston toured in the late 1970s and early 1980s with the Tom Johnston Band, which featured fellow Doobie John Hartman on drums. While working on his solo projects, in 1982 Johnston rejoined the band for a farewell tour concert, after which the Doobie Brothers ceased performing as a band for the next five years.

In 1985, Johnston toured US clubs with a group called Border Patrol, that also included former Doobies Michael Hossack and briefly Patrick Simmons. This group toured but never recorded. In 1987, he contributed a tune to the Dirty Dancing soundtrack entitled "Where Are You Tonight?"

=== Current years (1987–present) ===
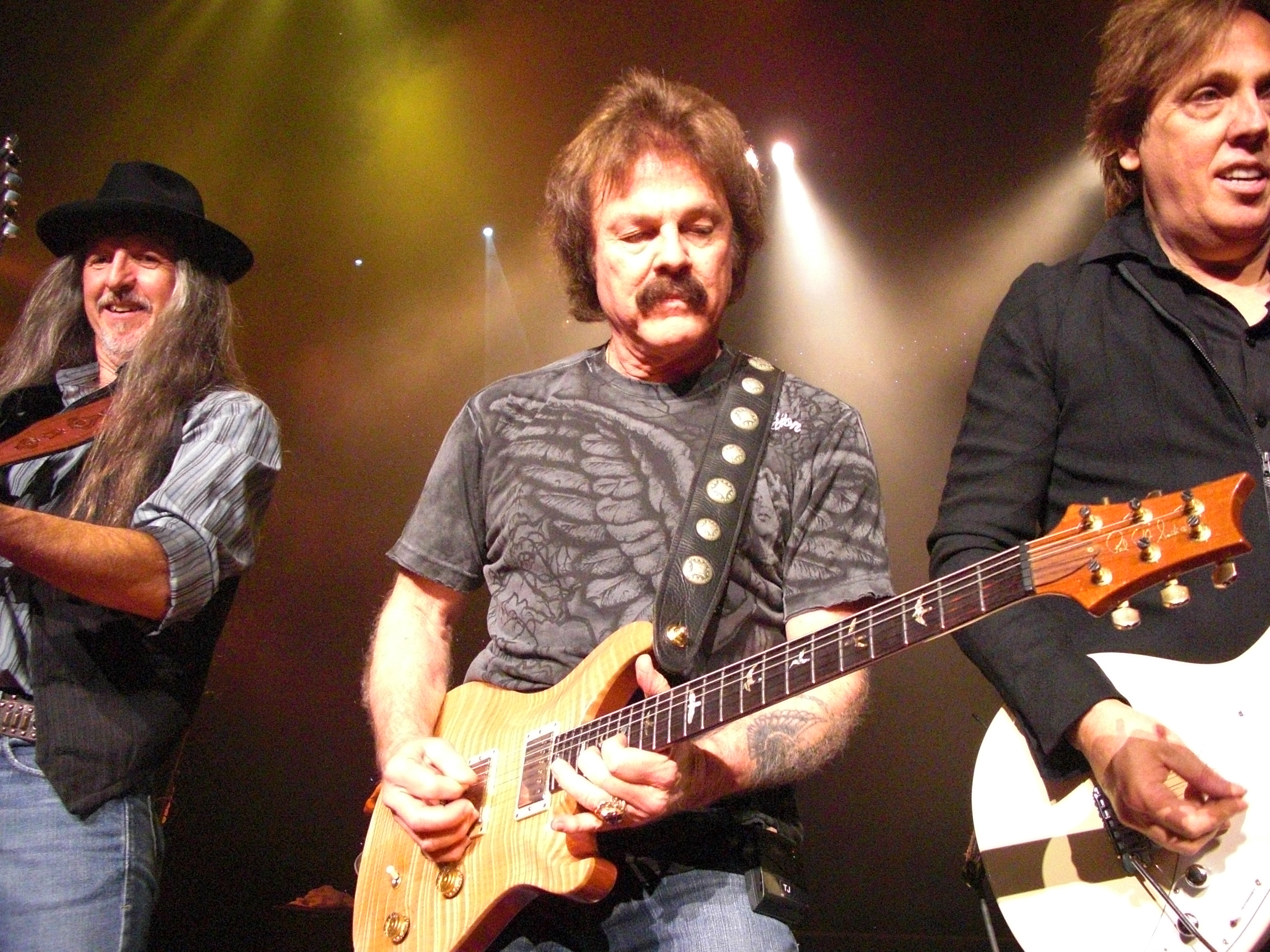
Doobie Brothers (Pat Simmons and John McFee, incl.) performing together (2009)

Johnston joined the Doobie Brothers when they reunited for a brief tour in 1987. This event led to the permanent reformation of the band, with Johnston again performing alongside co-founder Simmons. With Simmons, Johnston wrote Long Train Runnin': Our Story of the Doobie Brothers (2022).

== Road and studio gear outfitting ==
"Mine [first guitar] was an arch-back Harmony acoustic with f-holes. After that I got a Kay single-pickup electric with a cheap amplifier as that's all I could afford. Johnston now owns a mid-50s Fender Stratocaster that has been in his collection since the 1970s. He has a 1970 Les Paul Deluxe goldtop with classic white P-90 'soapbar' pickups affixed with an American Flag, that has been his primary Les Paul for 40 years. He also relies upon a 2008 PRS Custom 24 as a touring backup for his primary PRS. His primary touring guitar is a 2009 PRS 25th Anniversary Custom 24. It has a Modern Eagle inlay on the headstock and 57/08 pickups. "I've got a lot of guitars. Basically, everything I use on the road is PRS and that is what I play live. I use two basic guitars live that I trade off and I have a Martin acoustic that I play as well live. It is pretty much all about Paul Reed Smith right now. At home I have a Stratocaster and I have some older guitars I have had for a long time, an old Les Paul, an old 335, a couple Strats and a Telecaster. But live and when I am out on the road, it is strictly PRS."

While primarily an electric guitarist, Johnston also plays acoustic guitars for exploration and song writing. He started with a Gibson J-50 which was used to record all acoustic guitar parts on the first four Doobie Brother albums and after it was stolen moved to Martin guitars. In his personal collection are a 1962 Martin 00–18 and a 1975 Martin D-42, and he has written various songs on the 00-18. Johnston uses a variety of software in his home studio for writing, and Digital Performer by MOTU as his recording software program.

Johnston has employed traditionally a three finger Clapton-Hendrix lead fingerstyle, only using all four fingers for barre chords. He said, "I use my little finger to play chords, but not for playing solos. The direction in which I bend a string depends on where the string I'm bending is on the neck. The lower strings are going to be pulled down, and the high strings are going to be pushed up. I use a lot of vibrato when I play solo. And for picking, it has to be up and down if you want to do a lot of speed. It's also better for clarity. Anything faster than quarter notes, you either have to use alternating picking or play with a regular flatpick and fingers."

Johnston has traditionally employed Herco Nylon Flex 50 flatpicks (old "Herco mediums"), allowing for the right combination of flex and durability for his chukka-style rhythm. He said "I always use Herco medium because they don't break, and they take forever to wear out. Actually the worst thing you can do with a Herco is lose it. They are easy to hold on to as well and I do sweat a lot playing live. In fact, I usually eat the nickel off the strings right down to the brass (circa 1976)."

In 2007 C.F. Martin & Co. released a limited run of 35 Tom Johnston Signature Edition Doobie-42 Artist Edition guitars, and Elderly Music Tom Johnston Doobie 42.

== Songs written by Johnston ==
- "Listen to the Music" — 1972
- "Long Train Runnin'" — 1973
- "China Grove" — 1973
- "The Captain and Me" — 1973
- "Eyes of Silver" — 1974
- "Another Park, Another Sunday" — 1974
- "The Doctor" — 1989
- "A Watcher's Point of View (Don't 'Cha Think)" — 1991

== Discography ==
=== With The Doobie Brothers ===
- The Doobie Brothers (1971)
- Toulouse Street (1972)
- The Captain and Me (1973)
- What Were Once Vices Are Now Habits (1974)
- Stampede (1975)
- Takin' It to the Streets (1976)
- Cycles (1989)
- Brotherhood (1991)
- Sibling Rivalry (2000)
- World Gone Crazy (2010)
- Southbound (2014)
- Liberté (2021)

=== Solo ===
Albums

- Everything You've Heard Is True (1979) (AUS #97 (U.S. Billboard #100)
- Still Feels Good (1981) (U.S. Billboard #158)

Singles

Year	Label	A-side	B-side
1979	Warner Bros. Records	"Savannah Nights"	"Outlaw"
1980	Warner Bros. Records	"Reachin' Out For Lovin' From You"	"I Can Count On You"
1981	Warner Bros. Records	"Wastin' Time"	"One-Way Ticket"
1981	Warner Bros. Records	"Baby, Take Me In"	"Excuse Me Ma'am"
1981	Warner Bros. Records	"One-Way Ticket"	"Last Desperado"
