= The Captain and Me =

Studio album by The Doobie Brothers
- Released: March 2, 1973
- Recorded: 1972–1973
- Studios: Warner Bros. Studios, North Hollywood
- Genres: Hard rock; country rock; boogie rock
- Length: 41:53
- Label: Warner Bros.
- Producer: Ted Templeman

The Doobie Brothers chronology
Toulouse Street (1972)	The Captain and Me (1973)	What Were Once Vices Are Now Habits (1974)

Singles from The Captain and Me
- 1. "Long Train Runnin'" / "Without You" Released: March 28, 1973; 2. "China Grove" / "Evil Woman" Released: July 25, 1973

Professional ratings
Review scores
Source	Rating
AllMusic	4.5/5 stars
Encyclopedia of Popular Music	4/5 stars
The Great Rock Discography	7/10
MusicHound Rock	2.5/5
Record Collector	5/5 stars
Rolling Stone	(favorable)
The Rolling Stone Album Guide	3/5 stars

The Captain and Me is the third studio album by American rock band The Doobie Brothers, released on March 2, 1973, by Warner Bros. Records. It features some of the band's most popular songs, including "Long Train Runnin'", "China Grove" and "Without You". The album has been certified 2× Platinum by the Recording Industry Association of America (RIAA). It was voted number 835 in the third edition of Colin Larkin's All Time Top 1000 Albums (2000).

== Recording and content ==
There was pressure on the band to move quickly and to save time they began reworking old tunes. One of Tom Johnston's songs, "Osborn", had been an improvisational piece that the band played live. After laying down the track, according to producer Ted Templeman, "We still really didn't have it, and I said, 'Make it about a train, since you have this thing about 'Miss Lucy down along the track.' So he came up with "Long Train Runnin'."

Synthesizers and strings were brought in to record The Captain and Me. Synth programmers Malcolm Cecil and Robert Margouleff were brought in to engineer the opening track, "Natural Thing". Striving for a synthesized sound like that of The Beatles' "Being for the Benefit of Mr. Kite!", they would overdub individual notes to create chords for the song's bridge.

"Dark Eyed Cajun Woman" was a bluesy track (one of the band's earliest) and seen by Johnston as a tribute to the blues and B.B. King.

"Clear as the Driven Snow", according to Johnston, is a warning about recreational chemical abuse, which reflected the band members' lifestyles at that time.

The second side of the album opens with the rocker "Without You". This song, like many others, had begun as a jam. "That song had both drummers playing at the same time," Johnston stated. "It was kind of a tribute to The Who. We did it in concert for quite a while."

"South City Midnight Lady", while being about South San Francisco, is not about any woman in particular. Jeff Baxter of Steely Dan played pedal steel guitar on the track. Steely Dan was the opening act for the Doobie Brothers at a number of shows, and Baxter sat in with the Doobie Brothers on most of them, which lead to his guest appearance on The Captain and Me. He would become an official Doobie Brother in 1974. Cecil and Margouleff also added the synthesized effect of a woman whispering at the end.

Patrick Simmons' short solo guitar piece "Busted Down Around O'Connelly Corners" is followed by "Ukiah", which Johnston wrote in tribute to the area. Johnston said, "We played a few shows in Ukiah, and I used to camp out a lot in the area when I was going to college." The song's back-to-the-land sentiments also reflected some of his feelings at the time, although he admitted he probably couldn't make it as a farmer. This track segues into the album closer and title track, "The Captain and Me". According to Johnston, the captain is no one in particular and the lyrics were written at the last minute and have no real meaning. The song was released as a single in the Netherlands and received some airplay there. Ron Blomberg recalled he and Yankee captain Thurman Munson liking the song for its positive message "about people coming together to change things for the better," describing the song as having "pretty cosmic" words, and named his book about Munson after this song.

== Surround releases ==
The album was originally released in Quadraphonic sound on the CD-4 Quadradisc system and also on Quadraphonic 8-track tape. The album was also released in 2002 remixed into 5.1 multichannel DVD-Audio, and on 14 September 2011, on hybrid stereo-multichannel Super Audio CD by Warner Japan in their Warner Premium Sound series.

== Artwork ==
The artwork found on the front and back of the album features the band, including manager Bruce Cohn, dressed in 19th-century western garments and riding a horse-drawn stagecoach beneath an incomplete freeway overpass. "All that stuff came from the Warner Bros. film studios lot," Tom Johnston said. "It must've been a lot of work for the guys who brought up the horse team and the carriage and the clothes. It was fun to do—they had coffins out there, all kinds of crazy stuff." The photography was done by Michael and Jill Maggid. The setting for the cover was located at the Newhall Pass interchange of the Interstate 5 and California State Route 14 freeways near Sylmar, California, the incomplete bridge featured being one that partially collapsed during the 1971 San Fernando earthquake. This same section of freeway would collapse again during the 1994 Northridge earthquake.

== Track listing ==
Side one
No.	Title	Writer(s)	Vocals	Length
1.	"Natural Thing"	Tom Johnston	Tom Johnston	3:17
2.	"Long Train Runnin'"	Johnston	Johnston	3:25
3.	"China Grove"	Johnston	Johnston	3:14
4.	"Dark-Eyed Cajun Woman"	Johnston	Johnston	4:12
5.	"Clear as the Driven Snow"	Patrick Simmons	Patrick Simmons	5:18

Side two
No.	Title	Writer(s)	Vocals	Length
6.	"Without You"	John Hartman, Michael Hossack, Johnston, Tiran Porter, Simmons (Note: The album package credits this song to "The Doobie Brothers" rather than to the individual band members. This group credit is also used for the song on Best of The Doobies even though the band's lineup had changed by that time. The live album Rockin' Down the Highway: The Wildlife Concert credits the song to Johnston only.)	Johnston	4:58
7.	"South City Midnight Lady"	Simmons	Simmons	5:27
8.	"Evil Woman"	Simmons (Note: Early LP copies credit this song to "The Doobie Brothers." This is corrected on later copies of the album.)	Simmons	3:17
9.	"Busted Down Around O'Connelly Corners"	James Earl Luft	Instrumental	0:48
10.	"Ukiah"	Johnston	Johnston	3:04
11.	"The Captain and Me"	Johnston	Johnston	4:53

== Personnel ==
=== The Doobie Brothers ===
- Tom Johnston – guitars, ARP synthesizer, harmonica (2), vocals
- Pat Simmons – guitars, ARP, banjo (11), vocals
- Tiran Porter – bass, backing vocals
- John Hartman – drums, percussion, backing vocals
- Michael Hossack – drums, congas, timbales

==== Additional musicians ====
- Bill Payne – piano (3, 7, 10), electric piano (4), organ (6)
- Jeff "Skunk" Baxter – pedal steel guitar (7)
- Ted Templeman – percussion, backing vocals (6)
- Nick DeCaro – string arrangements (4, 7, 8)
- Malcolm Cecil – ARP programming (1, 5, 7, 10)
- Robert Margouleff – ARP programming (1, 5, 7, 10)

=== Technical ===
- Produced by Ted Templeman
- Engineered by Donn Landee
- Production coordination – Benita Brazier
- Art direction – Ed Thrasher
- Photography – Michael Maggid and Jill Maggid
- Design – John Casado and Barbara Casado
- Management – Bruce Cohn

== Charts ==
Chart (1973–1974)	Peak position
Canada (RPM)	10
New Zealand (RIANZ)	12
US (Billboard 200)	7

== Certifications ==
Region	Certification	Certified units/sales
Australia (ARIA)	Gold	20,000^{^}
^{^} Shipments figures based on certification alone.
