= Dangerous (The Doobie Brothers song) =

Single by The Doobie Brothers

from the album Brotherhood
- Released: April 15, 1991
- Recorded: 1990
- Genre: Rock
- Length: 5:06
- Label: Capitol
- Songwriter: Patrick Simmons
- Producer: Rodney Mills

The Doobie Brothers singles chronology
"South of the Border" (1989)	"Dangerous" (1991)	"Rollin' On" (1991)

"Dangerous" is a song by American rock band The Doobie Brothers, from their eleventh album, Brotherhood (1991), with Patrick Simmons singing the lead vocal. The song deals with riding down a road where danger surrounds the protagonist of the song at every turn. But the song tells that it's because of these dangers that the man continues to ride and loves every minute of it.

Writer Patrick Simmons included the lyric that the man in the song is riding a Harley-Davidson motorcycle, which is very common in the songs Simmons writes (he is fond of the brand of bikes himself). The song was featured on the soundtrack for the 1991 movie Stone Cold.

== Charts ==
Chart (1991)	Peak position
Australia (Kent Music Report)	171
US Mainstream Rock (Billboard)	2
US Cash Box Top 100	75
