= The Doctor (The Doobie Brothers song) =

Single by The Doobie Brothers

from the album Cycles
- B-side: "Too High a Price"
- Released: May 3, 1989
- Recorded: 1989
- Genre: Rock and Roll
- Length: 3:47
- Label: Capitol
- Songwriter: Tom Johnston/Charlie Midnight/Eddie Schwartz
- Producer: Charlie Midnight/Eddie Schwartz/Rodney Mills

The Doobie Brothers singles chronology
"You Belong to Me (live)" (1983)	"The Doctor" (1989)	"Need a Little Taste of Love" (1989)

"The Doctor" is a hit single released by The Doobie Brothers on their 1989 studio album, Cycles. The song, to date, is the last hit single that the band has released; it reached the number 1 spot on the Billboard mainstream rock chart and peaked at number 9 on the Billboard Hot 100.

The song was released with a music video that features the band playing to the tune with all of the members present. The video also got significant airplay on the music video channels throughout the US and helped propel the song into the spotlight. Guitarist and founding member Tom Johnston sang the lead vocal, after returning from years of being out of the band after Michael McDonald took over in the mid-1970s. Johnston told Songfacts that he wrote most of the song before the band re-formed when he was in a band called Border Patrol.

== Charts ==
=== Weekly charts ===
Chart (1989)	Peak position
Italy Airplay (Music & Media)	11

=== Year-end charts ===
Chart (1989)	Position
Canada Top Singles (RPM)	62
US (Joel Whitburn's Pop Annual)	112
