= Michael Hossack =

American drummer (1946–2012)

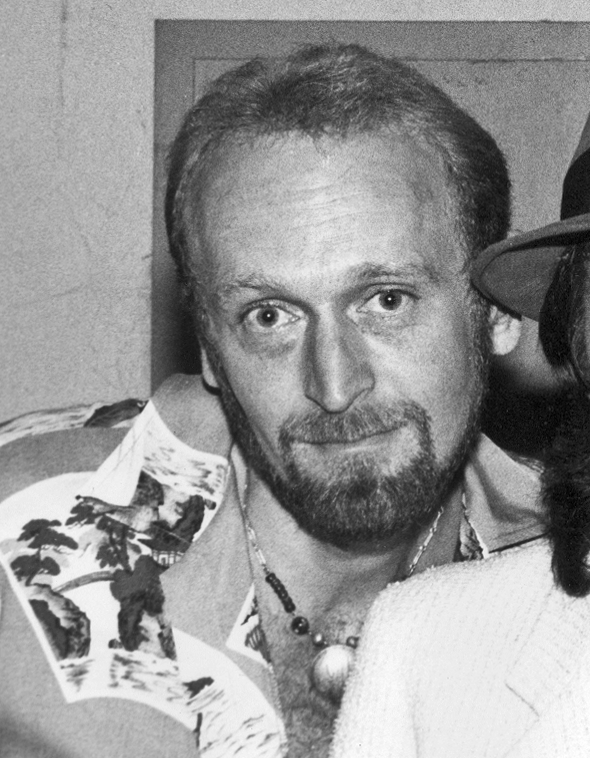
- Hossack in 1982

Background information
- Also known as: Big Mike
- Born: October 17, 1946; Paterson, New Jersey, U.S.
- Died: March 12, 2012 (aged 65) Dubois, Wyoming, U.S.
- Genres: Rock
- Occupation: Drummer
- Years active: 1969–2010

Michael Joseph Hossack (October 17, 1946 – March 12, 2012) was an American drummer for the rock band The Doobie Brothers.

== Biography ==
Born in Paterson, New Jersey, Hossack was known as "Big Mike" to his former band members. He started playing drums in the Little Falls Cadets, a Boy Scout drum and bugle corps, as well as Our Lady of Lourdes Cadets and Fair Lawn Cadets. He credited his discipline in playing alongside other drummers, to the teachings of his instructors Bob Peterson, George Tuthill and Joe Whelan.

After graduating high school, he served for four years in the United States Navy during the Vietnam War era. After being honorably discharged in 1969, he returned home to New Jersey to pursue a career in law enforcement. A close friend talked him into auditioning for a California-based band called Mourning Reign. After a difficult period in upstate New York the band relocated to the San Francisco bay area and signed with a production company that had also signed the newly formed rock band the Doobie Brothers.

Although Mourning Reign was short-lived, Hossack gained exposure and in 1971 was invited to jam with the Doobies in an audition at Bimbo's 365 Club. After hearing the founding drummer John Hartman perform with Hossack, the Doobies decided that having two drummers would enhance the rhythm section. They adopted the "dual drummers" sound pioneered by bands such as the Grateful Dead and Allman Brothers Band. Hossack played alongside Hartman on the band's breakthrough albums Toulouse Street in 1972, The Captain and Me in 1973 and What Were Once Vices are Now Habits in 1974, which spawned the band's first #1 hit, "Black Water".

After a busy ten-month tour in 1973, Hossack left the Doobies. He went on to join Bobby Winkelman's band Bonaroo, which released one album then disbanded shortly afterwards. In 1976, he had a brief stint with a band called DFK (or the Dudek Finnigan Krueger Band), with Les Dudek, Mike Finnigan and Jim Krueger. In 1977, Hossack became a partner in Chateau Recorders studio in North Hollywood. An avid outdoorsman, when Hossack was not in the studio or on tour, he was often riding his Harley-Davidson motorcycle, hunting or fishing.

In 1987, former band member Keith Knudsen called Hossack and asked if he would participate in a series of benefit concerts for veterans of the Vietnam War. A veteran himself, Hossack agreed and the Doobie Brothers (after a five-year hiatus) were back together again. Due to the success of these concerts, the Doobie Brothers decided to play together again with band members Pat Simmons, Tom Johnston, John Hartman, Tiran Porter, Bobby LaKind and Michael Hossack. Not long afterwards they were offered a recording contract from Capitol Records. Since then Hossack's style can be heard on the albums Cycles, Brotherhood, Rockin' down the Highway: The Wildlife Concert, Sibling Rivalry, Live at Wolf Trap and World Gone Crazy.

On June 22, 2001, while heading to a show at Caesars Tahoe in Lake Tahoe, Hossack suffered multiple fractures from a motorcycle accident on Highway 88 and had to be airlifted to a Sacramento-area hospital where he underwent surgery. After months of convalescence and difficult physical therapy, Hossack returned to the band permanently until he developed cancer in 2010 and had to take a leave of absence to focus on his health.

In 2012, Hossack died of cancer at his home in Dubois, Wyoming at the age of 65.

As a member of the Doobie Brothers, Hossack was posthumously inducted into the Rock and Roll Hall of Fame in 2020.

== Selected discography with the Doobie Brothers ==
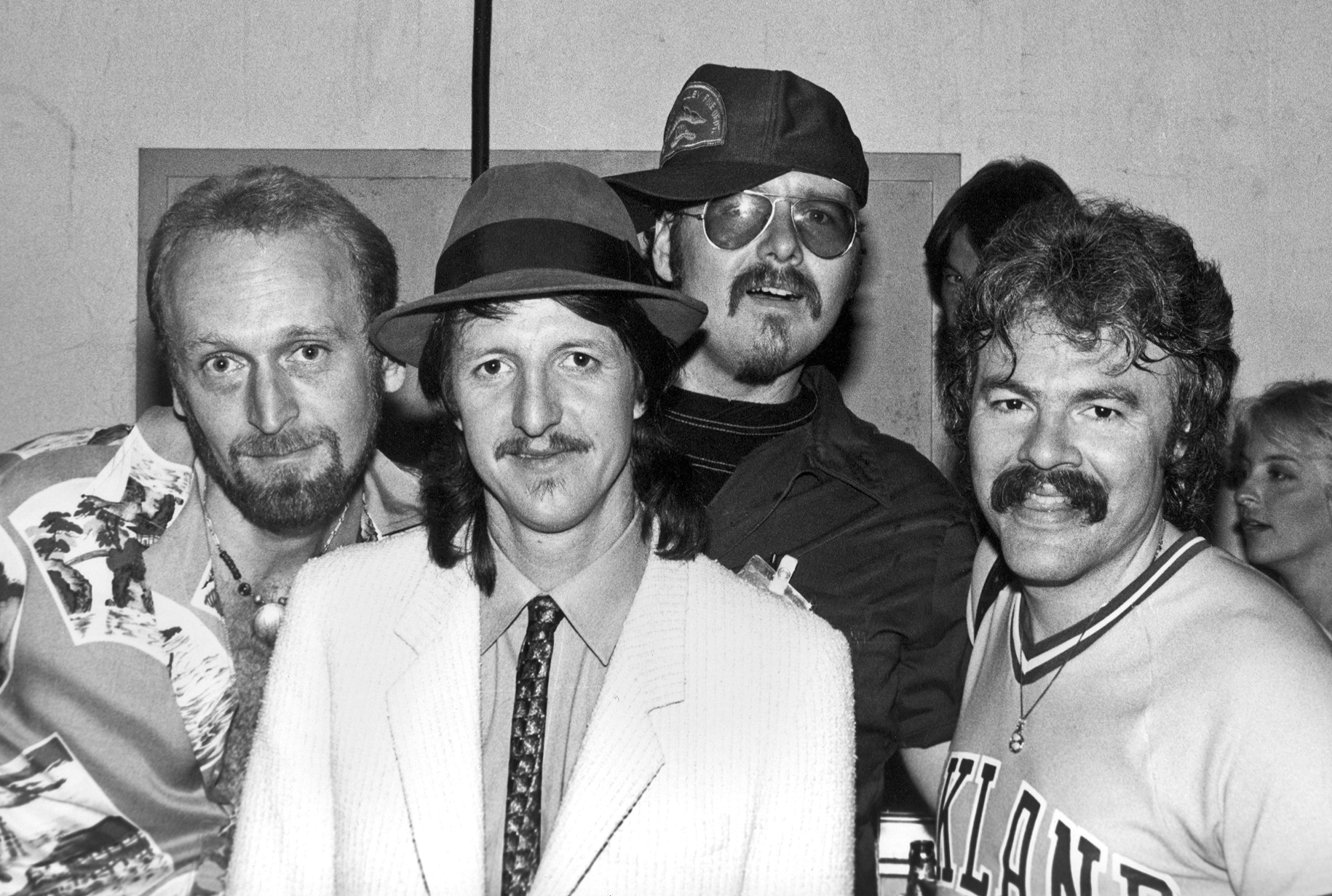
Hossack (far left) as part of the Doobie Brothers in 1982

- Toulouse Street
- The Captain and Me
- What Were Once Vices Are Now Habits
- Cycles
- Brotherhood
- Rockin' Down the Highway: The Wildlife Concert
- Best of the Doobie Brothers Live
- Sibling Rivalry
- Divided Highway
- Live at Wolf Trap
- Live at the Greek Theatre 1982 (guest appearance on one song)
