= John Hartman =

American drummer (1950–2021)

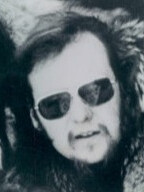
- Hartman in 1974

Background information
- Born: March 18, 1950; Falls Church, Virginia, U.S.
- Died: December 29, 2021 (aged 71)
- Genre: Rock
- Occupation: Drummer
- Formerly of: The Doobie Brothers

John Hartman (March 18, 1950 – December 29, 2021) was an American drummer who was a co-founder and original drummer of the Doobie Brothers. At the band's inception, Hartman was the sole drummer. However, in late 1971, the group added drummer Michael Hossack, and the dual-drummer formation remained until 2016 when Ed Toth became the band's sole drummer. Hossack was replaced in 1973 by Keith Knudsen.

== Early life ==
John Hartman was born in Falls Church, Virginia on March 18, 1950. He attended J.E.B. Stuart High School. He left before his Senior year going to California to find a career as a drummer.

== Career ==
Hartman formed The Doobie Brothers in 1970, and played on all of the band's major hits of the 1970s, with both Tom Johnston and Michael McDonald. He left early in 1979, following a promotional tour in support of the award-winning Minute by Minute, album to look after Arabian horses on his California ranch.

Hartman was enticed to join twelve Doobies alumni (including drummers Hossack, Knudsen, and Hartman's own 1979 replacement Chet McCracken) for a brief benefit tour in 1987. Hartman subsequently rejoined when the band was reconstituted the following year. He played on the reunion albums Cycles (1989) and Brotherhood (1991), as well as the accompanying promotional tours. However, following a 1992 alumni reunion for the benefit of terminally ill percussionist Bobby LaKind, Hartman retired permanently from the band. He was replaced by his former partner, Keith Knudsen.

In 2020, he was inducted into the Rock and Roll Hall of Fame as a member of The Doobie Brothers.

== Death ==
In September 2022, The Doobie Brothers announced Hartman's death. Hartman had died on December 29, 2021, at the age of 71. Because of the delayed announcement, Hartman's death was widely misreported as occurring in 2022.

== Discography ==
=== Albums ===
- The Doobie Brothers (1971)
- Toulouse Street (1972) (US #21)
- The Captain and Me (1973) (US #7)
- What Were Once Vices Are Now Habits (1974) (US #4)
- Stampede (1975) (US #4)
- Takin' It to the Streets (1976) (US #8)
- Livin' on the Fault Line (1977) (US #10)
- Minute by Minute (1978) (US #1)
- Cycles (1989) (US #17)
- Brotherhood (1991) (US #82)
- On Our Way Up (2001)
- Divided Highway (2003) (consisting of tunes from Cycles and Brotherhood)
- Live at the Greek Theatre 1982 [Live] (2011) (guest appearance on one song)
