= Listen to the Music: The Very Best of The Doobie Brothers =

Listen to the Music: The Very Best of the Doobie Brothers

Greatest hits album by The Doobie Brothers
- Released: May 24, 1993
- Recorded: 1972–1980
- Genre: Rock
- Length: 74:12
- Labels: WEA, Warner Bros.
- Producers: Ted Templeman, Rodney Mills

The Doobie Brothers chronology
| Brotherhood (1991) | Listen to the Music: The Very Best of the Doobie Brothers (1993) | Rockin' Down the Highway: The Wildlife Concert (1996) |

Listen to the Music: The Very Best of the Doobie Brothers is a compilation album by American rock band the Doobie Brothers, released in 1993. The album has 19 tracks, including a remix version of "Long Train Runnin'". The album reached at number 10 on the ARIA Charts and also peaked at number 19 on the Official New Zealand Music Chart.

== Reception ==
Professional ratings
Review scores
| Source | Rating |
|---|---|
| AllMusic | 4.5/5 stars |

Stephen Thomas Erlewine from AllMusic wrote: "Until the release of Rhino's 2001 collection, [this] was the most comprehensive Doobie Brothers overview on the market." He called it "a good collection" but the Rhino collection "is cheaper and easier to find".

== Track listing ==
Listen to the Music: The Very Best of The Doobie Brothers track listing
| No. | Title | Writer(s) | Original album | Length |
|---|---|---|---|---|
| 1. | "Long Train Runnin'" | Tom Johnston | The Captain and Me, 1973 | 3:27 |
| 2. | "China Grove" | Johnston | The Captain and Me, 1973 | 3:15 |
| 3. | "Listen to the Music" | Johnston | Toulouse Street, 1972 | 3:50 |
| 4. | "Takin' It to the Streets" | Michael McDonald | Takin' It to the Streets, 1976 | 3:39 |
| 5. | "Black Water" | Patrick Simmons | What Were Once Vices Are Now Habits, 1974 | 4:19 |
| 6. | "Jesus Is Just Alright" | Arthur Reid Reynolds | Toulouse Street, 1972 | 3:16 |
| 7. | "Rockin' Down the Highway" | Johnston | Toulouse Street, 1972 | 3:21 |
| 8. | "Take Me in Your Arms (Rock Me a Little While)" | Brian Holland, Lamont Dozier, Eddie Holland | Stampede, 1975 | 3:41 |
| 9. | "Without You" | Johnston, Simmons, Tiran Porter, John Hartman, Michael Hossack | The Captain and Me, 1973 | 5:02 |
| 10. | "South City Midnight Lady" | Simmons | The Captain and Me, 1973 | 5:31 |
| 11. | "It Keeps You Runnin'" | McDonald | Takin' It to the Streets, 1976 | 4:19 |
| 12. | "Little Darling (I Need You)" | Holland, Dozier, Holland | Livin' on the Fault Line, 1977 | 3:26 |
| 13. | "You Belong to Me" | McDonald, Carly Simon | Livin' on the Fault Line, 1977 | 3:06 |
| 14. | "Minute by Minute" | McDonald, Lester Abrams | Minute by Minute, 1978 | 3:28 |
| 15. | "Here to Love You" | McDonald | Minute by Minute, 1978 | 4:01 |
| 16. | "Real Love" | McDonald, Rev. Patrick Henderson | One Step Closer, 1980 | 4:14 |
| 17. | "What a Fool Believes" | McDonald, Kenny Loggins | Minute by Minute, 1978 | 3:44 |
| 18. | "Long Train Runnin'" (Locomotive Remix '93) | Johnston | | 3:32 |
| 19. | "Listen to the Music" (Motiv8 7" Edit) | Johnston | | 3:44 |
| Total length: | | | | 74:12 |

== Personnel ==
- Tom Johnston – lead and backing vocals, guitars, harmonica
- Patrick Simmons – lead and backing vocals, guitars, banjo
- Michael McDonald – lead and backing vocals, keyboards, synthesizers
- John McFee – backing vocals, guitars
- John Hartman – drums, percussion
- Michael Hossack – drums, percussion
- Tiran Porter – backing vocals, bass
- Keith Knudsen – backing vocals, drums, percussion
- Jeff "Skunk" Baxter – guitars
- Bobby LaKind – backing vocals, congas, bongos
- Chet McCracken – drums, percussion
- Cornelius Bumpus – backing vocals, saxophones, organ

== Charts ==
=== Weekly charts ===
Weekly chart performance for Listen to the Music: The Very Best of The Doobie Brothers
| Chart (1993–1996) | Peak position |
|---|---|
| Australian Albums (ARIA) | 10 |
| Canada Top Albums/CDs (RPM) | 41 |
| Dutch Albums (Album Top 100) | 34 |
| New Zealand Albums (RMNZ) | 19 |

=== Year-end charts ===
1994 year-end chart performance for Listen to the Music: The Very Best of The Doobie Brothers
| Chart (1994) | Position |
|---|---|
| Australian Albums (ARIA) | 80 |

== Certifications ==
Certifications and sales for Listen to the Music: The Very Best of The Doobie Brothers
| Region | Certification | Certified units/sales |
|---|---|---|
| Australia (ARIA) | 2× Platinum | 140,000^{^} |
| Canada (Music Canada) | Gold | 50,000^{^} |
| United Kingdom (BPI) | Gold | 100,000^{^} |
^{^} Shipments figures based on certification alone.
