= List of the Doobie Brothers band members =

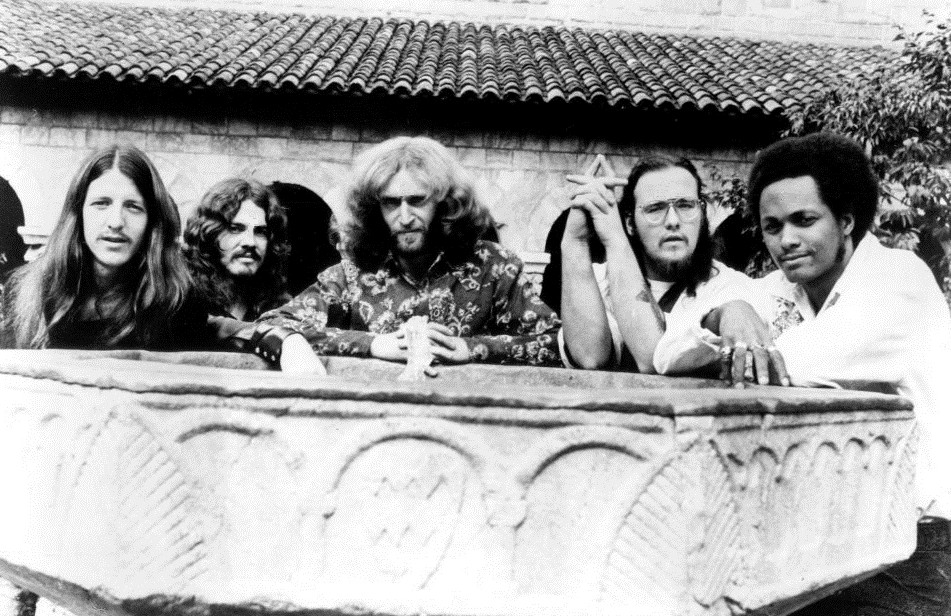
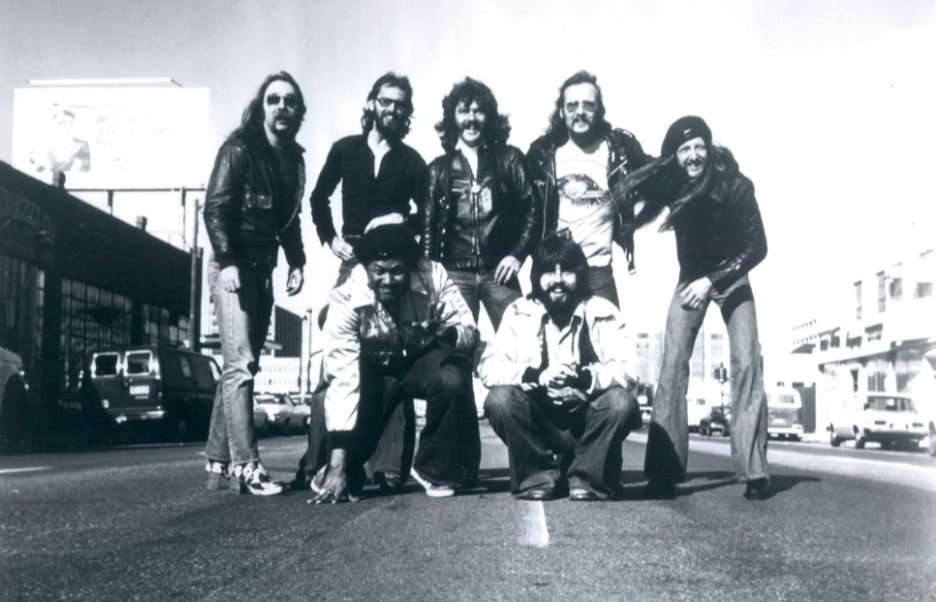
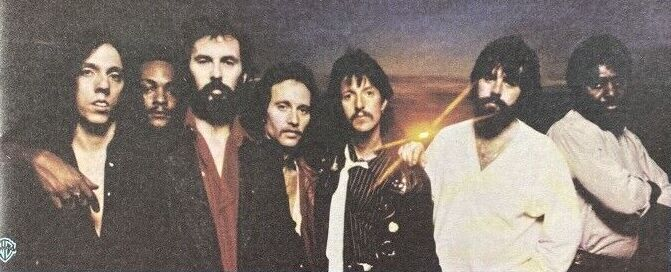
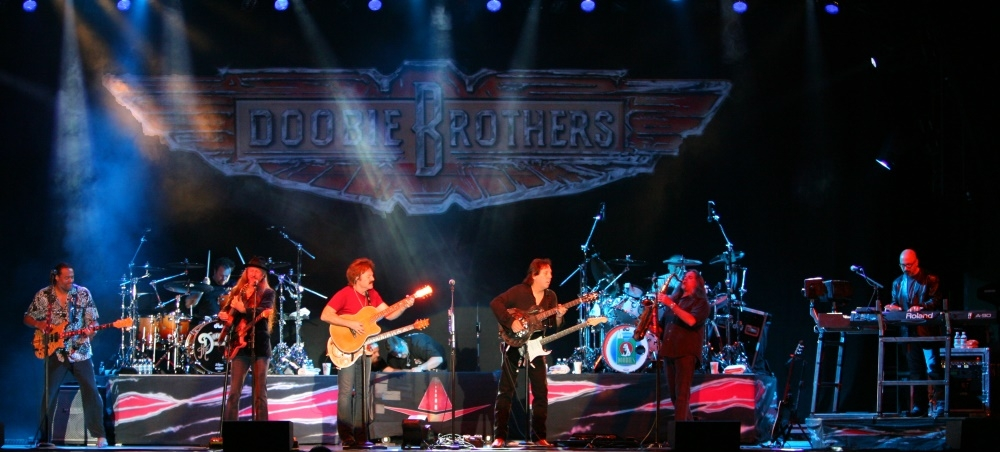
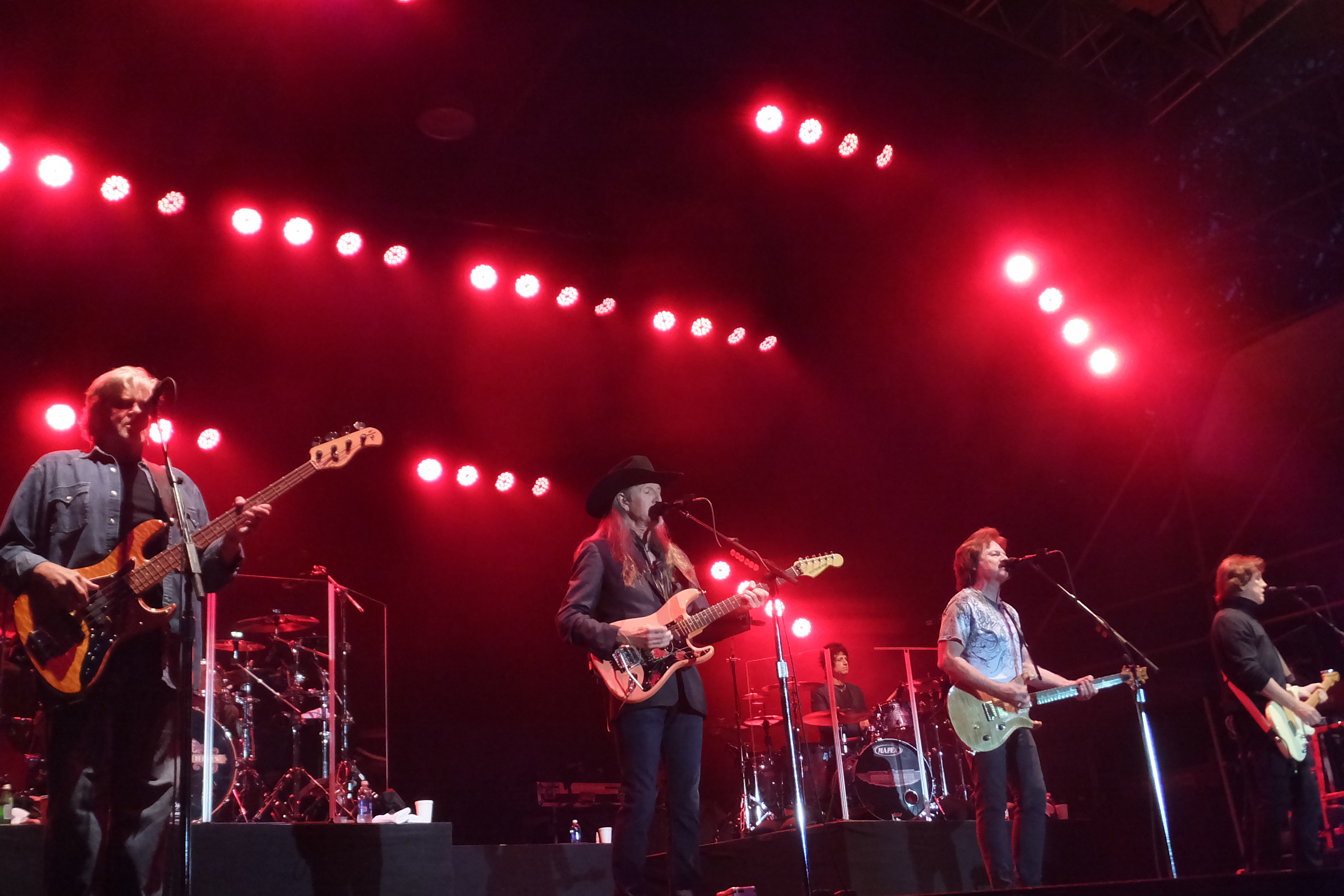
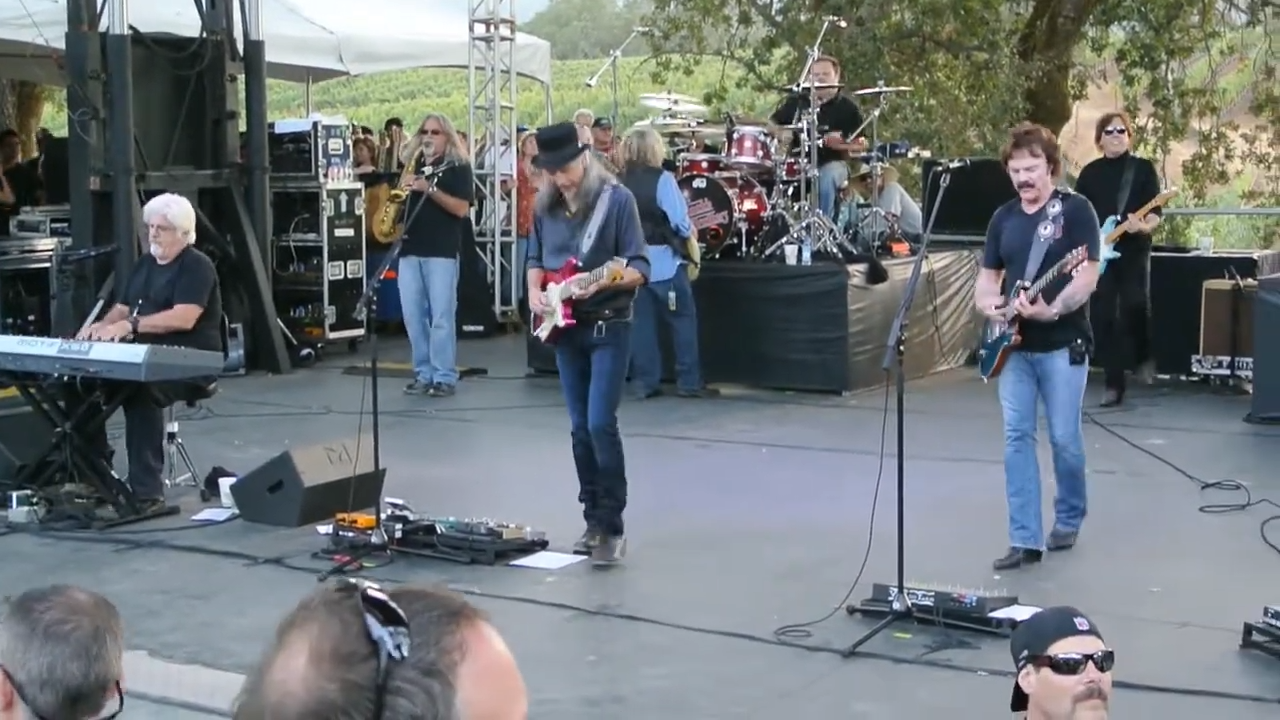
Six line-ups of The Doobie Brothers in 1972, 1976, 1980, 2006, 2013 and 2018

The Doobie Brothers are an American rock band from San Jose, California. Formed in the fall of 1970, the group was originally a quartet that featured lead vocalist and guitarist Tom Johnston, guitarist and second vocalist Patrick Simmons, bassist Dave Shogren, and drummer John Hartman. The current lineup features Johnston and Simmons alongside vocalist and keyboardist Michael McDonald (who originally joined in 1975), and guitarist/violinist John McFee (who originally joined in 1978). The group's touring lineup also features four additional performers: bassist John Cowan (from 1993 to 1995, and since 2010), saxophonist Marc Russo (since 1998), drummer Ed Toth (since 2005), and percussionist Marc Quiñones (since 2018).

== History ==
=== 1970–1982 ===
Tom Johnston, Patrick Simmons, Dave Shogren, and John Hartman founded the Doobie Brothers in the fall of 1970. After the band released its self-titled debut album and recorded two tracks for 1972's follow-up Toulouse Street, Shogren was replaced by Tiran Porter and Michael Hossack was added as a second drummer in December 1971. The Captain and Me followed, after which Hossack was replaced by Keith Knudsen in September 1973. What Were Once Vices Are Now Habits, released in 1974, featured both Hossack and Knudsen. In September 1974, the Doobie Brothers expanded to a six-piece when pedal steel guitarist Jeff "Skunk" Baxter left Steely Dan to join the group. During the tour in promotion of 1975's Stampede, Johnston was forced to take time off due to a stomach illness.

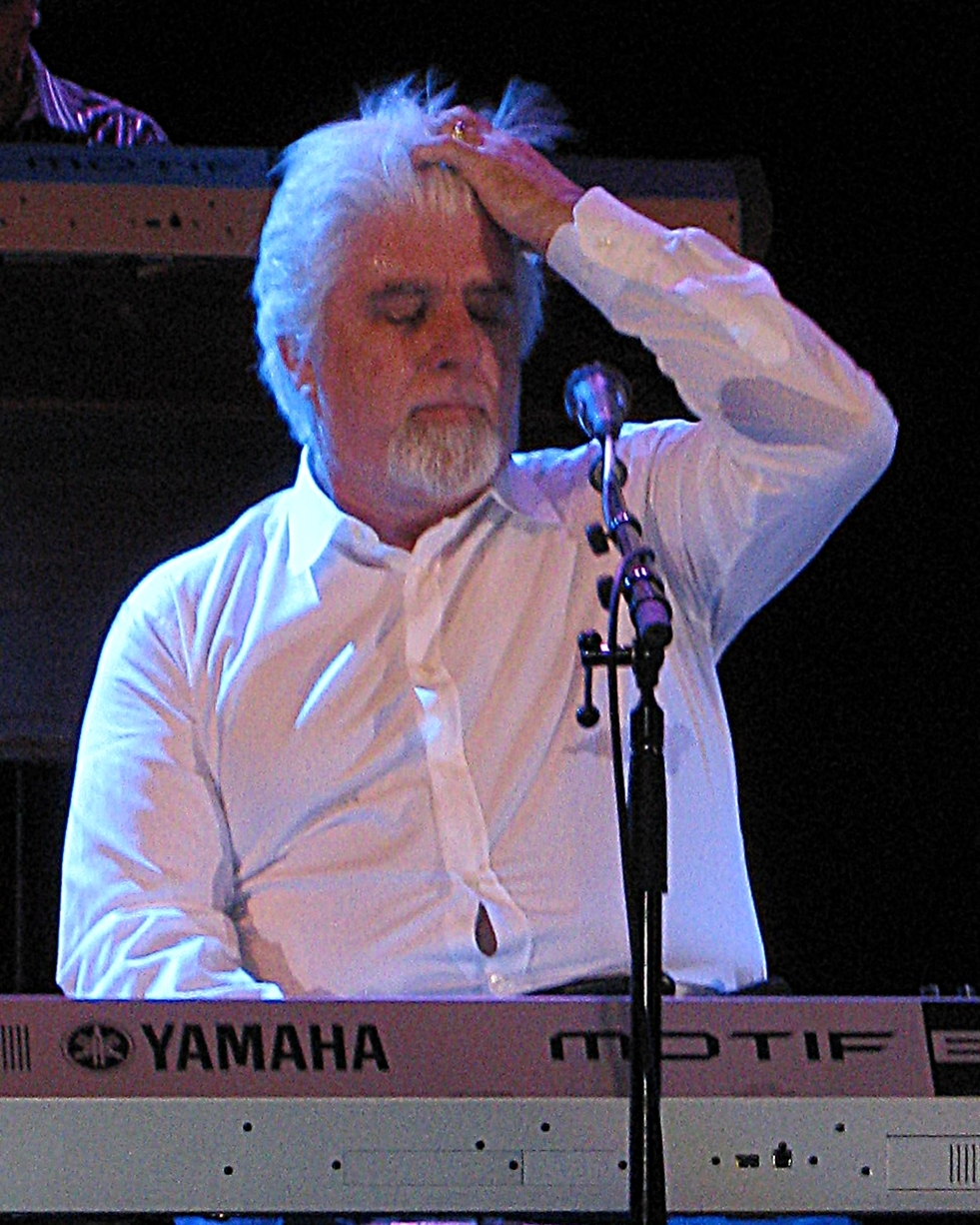
Michael McDonald joined the band in 1975, initially filling in for Tom Johnston on tour before becoming a full-time member.

With Johnston having to leave in the middle of a tour, Michael McDonald was brought in on keyboards and vocals. The group released Takin' It to the Streets in 1976. After the release of its follow-up Livin' on the Fault Line, Johnston decided to leave the group due to stylistic differences, and embarked on a solo career. He was not replaced, as McDonald subsequently took over as primary lead vocalist. Minute by Minute was released in 1978, before Jeff Baxter and founding drummer John Hartman left in April 1979 – the former to focus on record production, and the latter to pursue a career in veterinary medicine.

Baxter and Hartman were replaced by John McFee and Chet McCracken, respectively, while Cornelius Bumpus joined on saxophone and keyboards. After recording One Step Closer in 1980, Porter was replaced by Willie Weeks, and backup percussionist Bobby LaKind became an official band member. With both leading members Simmons and McDonald beginning to focus more on their respective solo careers, it was announced in March 1982 that the Doobie Brothers had disbanded. The group returned for a final concert tour in the summer, recordings from which were released the following year as Farewell Tour.

=== 1987–1998 ===
After a five-year absence, the Doobie Brothers reunited in May 1987 for a tour to benefit the Vietnam Veterans Aid Foundation, with a 12-piece lineup including Tom Johnston, Patrick Simmons, Michael McDonald, Jeff Baxter, John McFee, Tiran Porter, John Hartman, Michael Hossack, Keith Knudsen, Chet McCracken, Bobby LaKind, and Cornelius Bumpus. Following the tour, the group reformed permanently and signed with Capitol Records, with a six-piece lineup of Johnston, Simmons, Porter, Hartman, Hossack, and LaKind. The band's first studio album in nine years, Cycles, was released in May 1989.

After the release of Cycles, the group toured with saxophonist/keyboardist Bumpus and backup keyboardist Dale Ockerman. A few months into the tour, LaKind left due to medical issues and was replaced by Richard Bryant. Jimi Fox also joined as a second touring percussionist. For the tour in promotion of Brotherhood in 1991, Ockerman, Bryant and Fox remained as touring members. The group toured until November 1991, at which point it disbanded for a second time. In October 1992, the band reunited to perform two shows to benefit Bobby LaKind, who had been diagnosed with terminal colon cancer; the regular lineup was joined by former members Michael McDonald, Jeff Baxter, Bumpus, and LaKind himself. The percussionist died of his condition on December 24.

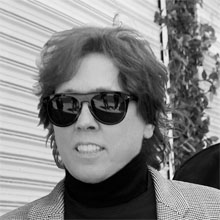
1979–82 guitarist/violinist John McFee rejoined the band in 1993 and has been a constant member ever since.

In the summer of 1993, the band reformed again with Johnston, Simmons, Hossack and Bumpus joined by John McFee, Willie Weeks and Keith Knudsen; after a few shows, Weeks and Bumpus were replaced by new touring members John Cowan and Danny Hull, respectively. By 1995, the group had been rejoined by McDonald and Bumpus. The tour also saw the introduction of new touring bassist Skylark, while McFee and Knudsen were substituted for select dates by Bernie Chiaravalle and Chet McCracken, respectively. After the recording of Rockin' Down the Highway: The Wildlife Concert, McDonald and Bumpus left, and Ockerman was replaced by Guy Allison.

=== Since 1998 ===
By summer 1998, Hull had been replaced by Marc Russo. The group released its first studio album in nine years, Sibling Rivalry, in October 2000. The following June, Hossack was sidelined after being injured in a motorcycle accident. He was temporarily replaced by Marvin "M.B." Gordy. After a few months, Hossack returned and Gordy remained as touring percussionist. Ed Wynne temporarily substituted for Russo during a tour in 2002.

In February 2005, Keith Knudsen died of pneumonia. In April, Gordy left the band. When they resumed touring, the group was joined by former Vertical Horizon drummer Ed Toth, who was introduced to them by Hossack. In the spring of 2010, Skylark was forced to leave after suffering a stroke, with John Cowan returning to take his place on tour; Hossack temporarily left around the same time, due to continuing effects stemming from his 2001 accident, with Tony Pia substituting. It later transpired that Hossack had contracted cancer, from which he later died in March 2012. Pia subsequently remained as second drummer.

Allison was replaced by Bill Payne of Little Feat in November 2015. The following summer, Pia left and Toth remained as the sole drummer. In May 2018, Marc Quiñones joined on percussion. In November 2019, it was announced that Michael McDonald would return for a 50th anniversary tour in 2020. However, due to the COVID-19 pandemic, the tour was postponed. In November 2021, after the tour concluded, Payne departed due to his commitment to Little Feat, and McDonald assumed his keyboard parts.

== Official members ==
=== Current members ===
Image	Name	Years active	Instruments	Release contributions
	Patrick Simmons	1970–1981; 1982; 1987–1991; 1992; 1993–present	guitar; banjo; flute; lead and backing vocals	all Doobie Brothers releases
	Tom Johnston	1970–1977; 1987–1991; 1992; 1993–present	guitar; harmonica; piano; lead and backing vocals	all Doobie Brothers releases from The Doobie Brothers (1971) to Takin' It to the Streets (1976), and from Farewell Tour (1983) – two tracks only onwards; Minute by Minute (1978) – one track only
	Michael McDonald	1975–1982; 1987; 1992; 1995–1996; 2014 (studio guest only); 2019–present	keyboards; piano; synthesizers; lead and backing vocals; mandolin	all Doobie Brothers releases from Takin' It to the Streets (1976) to Farewell Tour (1983); Rockin' Down the Highway: The Wildlife Concert (1996) – three tracks only; World Gone Crazy (2010) – one track only; Live at the Greek Theater 1982 (2011); Southbound (2014); Walk This Road (2025)
	John McFee	1979–1982; 1987; 1992; 1993–present	guitar; pedal steel guitar; violin; harmonica; banjo; mandolin; backing vocals	One Step Closer (1980); "Can't Let It Get Away" (1981); "Olana" (recorded in 1981, released in 2000); Farewell Tour (1983); all Doobie Brothers releases from Rockin' Down the Highway: The Wildlife Concert (1996) onwards

=== Former members ===
Image	Name	Years active	Instruments	Release contributions
	John Hartman	1970–1979; 1987–1991; 1992 (died 2021)	drums; percussion; backing vocals	all Doobie Brothers releases from The Doobie Brothers (1971) to Minute by Minute (1978); Cycles (1989); Brotherhood (1991); Live at the Greek Theater 1982 (2011)
	Dave Shogren	1970–1971 (died 1999)	bass; keyboards; guitar; backing vocals	The Doobie Brothers (1971); Toulouse Street (1972) – two tracks only
	Tiran Porter	1971–1980; 1987–1991; 1992	bass; backing and occasional lead vocals	all Doobie Brothers releases from Toulouse Street (1972) to One Step Closer (1980); Cycles (1989); Brotherhood (1991)
	Michael Hossack	1971–1973; 1987–1991; 1992; 1993–2012 (did not tour 2010–2012; until his death)	drums; percussion	Toulouse Street (1972); The Captain and Me (1973); What Were Once Vices Are Now Habits (1974); all Doobie Brothers releases from Cycles (1989) to Live at the Greek Theater 1982 (2011)
	Keith Knudsen	1973–1982; 1987; 1992; 1993–2005 (until his death)	drums; percussion; backing and occasional lead vocals	What Were Once Habits Are Now Vices (1974; backing vocals only); all Doobie Brothers releases from Stampede (1975) to Farewell Tour (1983); Rockin' Down the Highway: The Wildlife Concert (1996); Sibling Rivalry (2000); Live at Wolf Trap (2004); Live at the Greek Theater 1982 (2011)
	Jeff "Skunk" Baxter	1974–1979; 1987; 1992 (plus session contributions from 1972–73)	guitar; pedal steel guitar; live backing vocals	all Doobie Brothers releases from Stampede (1975) to Minute by Minute (1978) – excluding earlier guest appearances
	Bobby LaKind	1980–1982; 1987–1989; 1992 (touring/session from 1976–1980; died 1992)	percussion; congas; bongos; backing vocals	all Doobie Brothers releases from Takin' It to the Streets (1976) – three tracks only to Cycles (1989)
	Chet McCracken	1979–1982; 1987; 1992 (plus substitute in 1993 and 1995) (died 2022)	drums; percussion; vibraphone; marimba	One Step Closer (1980); "Can't Let It Get Away" (1981); "Olana" (recorded in 1981, released in 2000); Farewell Tour (1983); Live at the Greek Theater 1982 (2011)
	Cornelius Bumpus	1979–1982; 1987; 1989–1990; 1992; 1993; 1995–1996 (died 2004)	saxophone; Hammond organ; flute; synthesizers; backing and occasional lead vocals	One Step Closer (1980); "Can't Let It Get Away" (1981); "Olana" (recorded in 1981, released in 2000); Farewell Tour (1983); Rockin' Down the Highway: The Wildlife Concert (1996); Live at the Greek Theater 1982 (2011)
	Willie Weeks	1980–1982; 1993	bass; backing vocals	"Can't Let It Get Away" (1981); "Olana" (recorded in 1981, released in 2000); Farewell Tour (1983); Live at the Greek Theater 1982 (2011)

== Touring members ==
=== Current ===
Image	Name	Years active	Instruments	Release contributions
	John Cowan	1993–1995; 2010–present	bass; vocals	Sibling Rivalry (2010); Southbound (2014) – two tracks only; Live from the Beacon Theatre (2019) onwards
	Marc Russo	1998–present	saxophone	Sibling Rivalry (2000); Live at Wolf Trap (2004); World Gone Crazy (2010) – two tracks only; Live from the Beacon Theatre (2019) onwards
	Ed Toth	2005–present	drums; percussion	All Doobie Brothers releases from: World Gone Crazy (2010) onwards
	Marc Quiñones	2018–present	percussion; backing vocals	All Doobie Brothers releases from Live from the Beacon Theatre (2019), onwards

=== Former ===
Image	Name	Years active	Instruments	Details
	Wayne Jackson	1975–1976 (died 2016)	trumpet	Members of the Memphis Horns performed on Takin' It to the Streets and performed live with the band from late 1975 through 1976.
	Andrew Love	1975–1976 (died 2012)	tenor saxophone	Members of the Memphis Horns performed on Takin' It to the Streets and performed live with the band from late 1975 through 1976.
	Lewis Collins	1975–1976	tenor saxophone	Members of the Memphis Horns performed on Takin' It to the Streets and performed live with the band from late 1975 through 1976.
	James Mitchell	1975–1976	baritone saxophone	Members of the Memphis Horns performed on Takin' It to the Streets and performed live with the band from late 1975 through 1976.
	Jack Hale	1975–1976	trombone	Members of the Memphis Horns performed on Takin' It to the Streets and performed live with the band from late 1975 through 1976.
	Norton Buffalo	1977 (died 2009)	harmonica; backing vocals	Buffalo, Butler and McDonald appeared on the sessions for Livin' on the Fault Line.
	Rosemary Butler	1977	backing vocals	Buffalo, Butler and McDonald appeared on the sessions for Livin' on the Fault Line.
	Maureen McDonald	1977	backing vocals	Buffalo, Butler and McDonald appeared on the sessions for Livin' on the Fault Line.
	Dale Ockerman	1989–1991; 1993–1996	keyboards; backing vocals; guitar	In the absence of Michael McDonald, Ockerman began recording and touring from Cycles.
	Richard Bryant	1989–1991	percussion; backing vocals	After Bobby LaKind left due to medical issues, he was replaced by Bryant and Fox.
	Jimi Fox	1989–1991	percussion; backing vocals	After Bobby LaKind left due to medical issues, he was replaced by Bryant and Fox.
	Danny Hull	1993–1998	saxophone; harmonica; keyboards; percussion; backing vocals	Hull took over from Cornelius Bumpus after he left a few weeks into a tour in 1993.
	Skylark	1995–2010	bass; backing vocals	After previous touring bassist John Cowan declined to return in 1995, Skylark took over.
	Bernie Chiaravalle	1995 (substitute)	guitar	Chiaravalle temporarily substituted for the unavailable John McFee during a tour in 1995.
	Guy Allison	1996–2015	keyboards; backing vocals	Allison joined the band's touring lineup in summer 1996, taking over from Ockerman.
	Marvin "M.B." Gordy	2001–2005	percussion; drums (2001–02)	Gordy temporarily substituted for Michael Hossack, later remaining on percussion.
	Ed Wynne	2002 (substitute)	saxophone; trumpet; backing vocals	Wynne temporarily substituted for regular saxophonist Marc Russo during a tour in 2002.
	Tony Pia	2010–2016	drums; percussion	Pia substituted for Michael Hossack from 2010 to 2012, and remained after his death.
	Bill Payne	2015–2021 (plus session contributions in 1972–74, 1978, 1988 and 2009–10)	keyboards; backing vocals	Payne took over from Allison in 2015, and remained until 2021 when his main band, Little Feat, resumed.
	Michael Leonhart	2018	trumpet	Leonhart and Rosenberg played some shows in 2018 including the Live from the Beacon Theatre recording
	Roger Rosenberg	2018	saxophone	Leonhart and Rosenberg played some shows in 2018 including the Live from the Beacon Theatre recording

== Session ==
Image	Name	Years active	Instruments	Release contributions
	Ted Templeman	1972–1975; 1977–1978; 1980; 2007–2010	percussion; backing vocals; drums; tambourine; cowbell; maracas	Toulouse Street (1972); The Captain and Me (1973); What Were Once Vices Are Now Habits (1974); Stampede (1975); Takin' It to the Streets (1976); Livin' on the Fault Line (1977); Minute by Minute (1978); One Step Closer (1980); World Gone Crazy (2010)
	Jerry Jumonville	1972; 1980 (died 2019)	tenor saxophone	Toulouse Street (1972); One Step Closer (1980)
	Jon Robert Smith	1972	tenor saxophone	Toulouse Street (1972)
	Joe Lane Davis	1972	baritone saxophone	Toulouse Street (1972)
	Sherman Marshall Cyr	1972	trumpet	Toulouse Street (1972)
	Nick DeCaro	1972–1973	string arrangements	The Captain and Me (1973)
	Robert Margouleff	1972–1973	ARP synthesizer programming	The Captain and Me (1973)
	Malcolm Cecil	1972–1973 (died 2021)	ARP synthesizer programming	The Captain and Me (1973)
	Novi Novog	1973; 1974; 1978	viola; synthesizer solo	What Were Once Vices Are Now Habits (1974); Takin' It to the Streets (1976); Minute by Minute (1978)
	James Booker	1973 (died 1983)	piano	What Were Once Vices Are Now Habits (1974)
	Arlo Guthrie	1973	autoharp	What Were Once Vices Are Now Habits (1974)
	Eddie Guzman	1973	congas; timbales; percussion	What Were Once Vices Are Now Habits (1974)
	Milt Holland	1973 (died 2005)	tabla; vibraphone; marimba; pandeiro; percussion	What Were Once Vices Are Now Habits (1974)
	Maria Muldaur	1974; 1975	vocals	Stampede (1975); Takin' It to the Streets (1976)
	Victor Feldman	1974; 1977; (died 1987)	marimba; percussion; vibraphone	Stampede (1975); Livin' on the Fault Line (1977)
	Bobbye Hall Porter	1974	congas	Stampede (1975)
	Ry Cooder	1974	bottleneck guitar	Stampede (1975)
	Karl Himmel	1974	drums; percussion	Stampede (1975)
	Conte Candoli	1974 (died 2001)	trumpets	Stampede (1975)
	Pete Candoli	1974 (died 2008)	trumpets	Stampede (1975)
	Sherlie Matthews	1974	backing vocals	Stampede (1975)
	Venetta Fields	1974	backing vocals	Stampede (1975)
	Jessica Smith	1974	backing vocals	Stampede (1975)
	Harry Bluestone	1974 (died 1992)	concertmaster	Stampede (1975)
	Nick DeCaro	1974	string arrangements	Stampede (1975)
	Richard Tufo	1974	orchestration	Stampede (1975)
	Paul Riser	1974	string and horn arrangements	Stampede (1975)
	Curtis Mayfield	1974 (died 1999)	string and horn arrangements	Stampede (1975)
	Richie Hayward	1975 (died 2010)	drums	Takin' It to the Streets (1976)
	Jesse Butler	1975	organ	Takin' It to the Streets (1976)
	Dan Armstrong	1977 (died 2004)	electric sitar solo	Livin' on the Fault Line (1977)
	David Paich	1977	string and horn arrangements	Livin' on the Fault Line (1977)
	Nicolette Larson	1978; 1980 (died 1997)	vocals	Minute by Minute (1978); One Step Closer (1980)
	Byron Berline	1978 (died 2021)	fiddle	Minute by Minute (1978)
	Herb Pedersen	1978	banjo	Minute by Minute (1978)
	Lester Abrams	1978	electric piano	Minute by Minute (1978)
	Sumner Mering	1978	guitar	Minute by Minute (1978)
	Ben Cauley	1978 (died 2015)	trumpet	Minute by Minute (1978)
	Chris Thompson	1980; 1999–2000	backing vocals	One Step Closer (1980); Sibling Rivalry (2000)
	Patrick Henderson	1980 (died 2024)	keyboards	One Step Closer (1980)
	Lee Thornburg	1980	trumpet; flugelhorn	One Step Closer (1980)
	Joel Peskin	1980	baritone saxophone	One Step Closer (1980)
	Bill Armstrong	1980	trumpet	One Step Closer (1980)
	Jimmie Haskell	1980 (died 2016)	string arrangements	One Step Closer (1980)
	Kim Bullard	1988; 2007–2010	keyboards; synthesizer; piano	Cycles (1989); World Gone Crazy (2010)
	Shannon Eigsti	1988 (died 1988)	keyboards	Cycles (1989)
	Dave Tyson	1988	keyboards	Cycles (1989)
	Phil Aaberg	1988	keyboards	Cycles (1989)
	Don Frank	1988	electronic drums	Cycles (1989)
	Rem Smiers	1988	keytar	Cycles (1989)
	Steve Canali	1990	slide guitar	Brotherhood (1991)
	Vicki Randle	1990	backing vocals	Brotherhood (1991)
	Rem Smiers	1990	backing vocals	Brotherhood (1991)
	Yvonne Williams	1999–2000 (died 1997)	backing vocals	Sibling Rivalry (2000)
	Maxayn Lewis	1999–2000	backing vocals	Sibling Rivalry (2000)
	Bill Champlin	1999–2000	backing vocals	Sibling Rivalry (2000)
	Cris Sommer-Simmons	1999–2000	backing vocals	Sibling Rivalry (2000)
	Lil' Patrick Harley Simmons	1999–2000	backing vocals	Sibling Rivalry (2000)
	George Hawkins Jr	1999–2000	bass	Sibling Rivalry (2000)
	Bob Bangerter	1999–2000	acoustic rhythm guitar	Sibling Rivalry (2000)
	Bob Glaub	2007–2010; 2021; 2025	bass	World Gone Crazy (2010); Liberté (2021); Walk This Road (2025)
	James Hutchinson	2007–2010	bass	World Gone Crazy (2010)
	Willie Nelson	2007–2010	vocals	World Gone Crazy (2010)
	Ross Hogarth	2007–2010	guitar; drums; percussion	World Gone Crazy (2010)
	Tim Pierce	2007–2010	guitar	World Gone Crazy (2010)
	Gregg Bissonette	2007–2010	drums	World Gone Crazy (2010)
	Joey Waronker	2007–2010	drums	World Gone Crazy (2010)
	Karl Perazzo	2007–2010	percussion	World Gone Crazy (2010)
	Mic Gillette	2007–2010 (died 2016)	trumpets; trombones	World Gone Crazy (2010)
	Cameron Stone	2007–2010	cello	World Gone Crazy (2010)
	Siedah Garrett	2007–2010	backing vocals	World Gone Crazy (2010)
	Dorian Holley	2007–2010	backing vocals	World Gone Crazy (2010)
	Nayanna Holley	2007–2010	backing vocals	World Gone Crazy (2010)
	Darryl Phinnessee	2007–2010	backing vocals	World Gone Crazy (2010)
	Amy Holland-McDonald	2007–2010	backing vocals	World Gone Crazy (2010)
	Gail Swanson	2007–2010	backing vocals	World Gone Crazy (2010)
	Tim James	2007–2010	backing vocals	World Gone Crazy (2010)
	Zac Brown	2014	lead vocals	Southbound (2014)
	Sara Evans	2014	lead vocals	Southbound (2014)
	Tyler Farr	2014	lead vocals	Southbound (2014)
	Eric Gunderson	2014	lead vocals	Southbound (2014)
	Stephen Barker Liles	2014	lead vocals	Southbound (2014)
	Toby Keith	2014 (died 2024)	lead vocals	Southbound (2014)
	Jerrod Niemann	2014	lead vocals	Southbound (2014)
	Blake Shelton	2014	lead vocals	Southbound (2014)
	Amanda Sudano-Ramirez	2014	lead vocals	Southbound (2014)
	Chris Young	2014	lead vocals	Southbound (2014)
	Casey James	2014	lead vocals; guitar solo	Southbound (2014)
	Brad Paisley	2014	lead vocals; lead guitar	Southbound (2014)
	Charlie Worsham	2014	lead vocals; banjo	Southbound (2014)
	Tom Bukovac	2014	electric guitar	Southbound (2014)
	J. T. Corenflos	2014 (died 2020)	electric guitar	Southbound (2014)
	Jerry McPherson	2014	electric guitar	Southbound (2014)
	Vince Gill	2014	guitar solo	Southbound (2014)
	Dann Huff	2014	guitar solo	Southbound (2014)
	Hunter Hayes	2014	guitar	Southbound (2014)
	Bryan Sutton	2014	acoustic guitar; mandolin	Southbound (2014)
	Ilya Toshinsky	2014	acoustic guitar; banjo; bouzouki; mandolin	Southbound (2014)
	Tony Lucido	2014	bass	Southbound (2014)
	Tommy Sims	2014	bass	Southbound (2014)
	Jimmie Lee Sloas	2014	bass	Southbound (2014)
	Jimmy De Martini	2014	fiddle; backing vocals	Southbound (2014)
	Aubrey Haynie	2014	fiddle	Southbound (2014)
	Larry Hall	2014	violin; viola; cello; orchestration; trombone; trumpet	Southbound (2014)
	Dan Dugmore	2014	steel guitar; dobro	Southbound (2014)
	Charlie Judge	2014	keyboards	Southbound (2014)
	Michael Rojas	2014	keyboards	Southbound (2014)
	Shannon Forrest	2014	drums	Southbound (2014)
	Chris McHugh	2014	drums	Southbound (2014)
	Clay Cook	2014	backing vocals	Southbound (2014)
	Vicki Hampton	2014	backing vocals	Southbound (2014)
	John Driskell Hopkins	2014	backing vocals	Southbound (2014)
	Wendy Moten	2014	backing vocals	Southbound (2014)
	Huey Lewis	2014	harmonica	Southbound (2014)
	John Shanks	2021; 2025	electric and acoustic guitar; bass guitar; dobro; keyboards; synthesizer; piano; organ; programming; percussion; backing vocals	Liberté (2021); Walk This Road (2025)
	Victor Indrizzo	2021; 2025	drums; percussion	Liberté (2021); Walk This Road (2025)
	Bradley Giroux	2021; 2025	drum programming	Liberté (2021); Walk This Road (2025)
	Jeff Babko	2021; 2025	piano; synthesizer; Wurlitzer organ; Hammond organ; clavinet	Liberté (2021); Walk This Road (2025)
	Dan Keen	2021	string arrangements	Liberté (2021)
	Lucy Woodward	2021	backing vocals	Liberté (2021)
	Sharlotte Gibson	2025	backing vocals	Walk This Road (2025)
	Pino Palladino	2025	bass	Walk This Road (2025)
	Dean Parks	2025	electric guitar	Walk This Road (2025)
	Mavis Staples	2025	vocals	Walk This Road (2025)
	Henry Kapono	2025	vocals	Walk This Road (2025)
	Joel Jaffe	2025	horn arrangement	Walk This Road (2025)
	Jamie Hovorka	2025	trumpet	Walk This Road (2025)
	Marvin McFadden	2025	trumpet	Walk This Road (2025)
	Mike Rinta	2025	trombone	Walk This Road (2025)
	Woody Mankowski	2025	baritone and tenor saxophone	Walk This Road (2025)
	Johnnie Bamont	2025	baritone saxophone	Walk This Road (2025)
	Jamie Muhoberac	2025	keyboards	Walk This Road (2025)
	Sean Hurley	2025	bass	Walk This Road (2025)
	Mick Fleetwood	2025	drums	Walk This Road (2025)
	Jake Shimabukuro	2025	ukulele	Walk This Road (2025)

== Lineups ==
Period	Members	Releases
Fall 1970 – November 1971	Tom Johnston – lead vocals, guitar, harmonica, piano; Patrick Simmons – lead vocals, guitar, banjo; Dave Shogren – bass, organ, guitar, backing vocals; John Hartman – drums, percussion, backing vocals	The Doobie Brothers (1971); Toulouse Street (1972) – two tracks
December 1971 – September 1973	Tom Johnston – lead vocals, guitar, harmonica; Patrick Simmons – lead vocals, guitar, banjo; Tiran Porter – bass, backing vocals; John Hartman – drums, percussion, backing vocals; Michael Hossack – drums, percussion	Toulouse Street (1972) – remaining tracks; The Captain and Me (1973); What Were Once Vices Are Now Habits (1974)
September 1973 – September 1974	Tom Johnston – lead vocals, guitar, harmonica; Patrick Simmons – lead vocals, guitar, banjo; Tiran Porter – bass, backing vocals; John Hartman – drums, percussion, backing vocals; Keith Knudsen – drums, percussion, vocals	What Were Once Vices Are Now Habits (1974) – Knudsen's backing vocals
September 1974 – April 1975	Tom Johnston – lead vocals, guitar, harmonica; Patrick Simmons – lead vocals, guitar, banjo; Jeff Baxter – guitar, pedal steel guitar; Tiran Porter – bass, backing vocals; John Hartman – drums, percussion, backing vocals; Keith Knudsen – drums, percussion, vocals	Stampede (1975)
April 1975 – October 1977	Tom Johnston – lead vocals, guitar, harmonica; Patrick Simmons – lead vocals, guitar, banjo; Jeff Baxter – guitar, pedal steel guitar; Tiran Porter – bass, backing vocals; Michael McDonald – lead vocals, keyboards; John Hartman – drums, percussion, backing vocals; Keith Knudsen – drums, percussion, vocals; with: The Memphis Horns – horns (touring members 1976–77)	Takin' It to the Streets (1976); Livin' on the Fault Line (1977)
October 1977 – April 1979	Michael McDonald – lead vocals, keyboards; Patrick Simmons – lead vocals, guitar, banjo; Jeff Baxter – guitar, pedal steel guitar; Tiran Porter – bass, backing vocals; John Hartman – drums, percussion, backing vocals; Keith Knudsen – drums, percussion, vocals; with: Norton Buffalo – harmonica (touring member 1977–78); Rosemary Butler – vocals (touring member 1977–78); Maureen McDonald – vocals (touring member 1977–78)	Minute by Minute (1978)
May 1979 – August 1980	Michael McDonald – lead vocals, keyboards; Patrick Simmons – lead vocals, guitar, banjo; John McFee – guitar, violin, backing vocals; Tiran Porter – bass, backing vocals; Keith Knudsen – drums, percussion, vocals; Chet McCracken – drums, percussion, vibraphone; Cornelius Bumpus – saxophone, keyboards, vocals	One Step Closer (1980)
August 1980 – September 1982	Michael McDonald – lead vocals, keyboards; Patrick Simmons – lead vocals, guitar, banjo; John McFee – guitar, violin, backing vocals; Willie Weeks – bass, backing vocals; Keith Knudsen – drums, percussion, vocals; Chet McCracken – drums, percussion, vibraphone; Bobby LaKind – percussion, backing vocals; Cornelius Bumpus – saxophone, keyboards, vocals	Farewell Tour (1983)
Band inactive September 1982 – May 1987
May – July 1987	Tom Johnston – lead vocals, guitar; Michael McDonald – lead vocals, keyboards; Patrick Simmons – lead vocals, guitar, banjo; John McFee – guitar, violin, backing vocals; Jeff Baxter – guitar, pedal steel guitar; Tiran Porter – bass, backing vocals; John Hartman – drums, backing vocals; Michael Hossack – drums, percussion; Keith Knudsen – drums, percussion, vocals; Chet McCracken – drums, percussion, vibraphone; Bobby LaKind – percussion, backing vocals; Cornelius Bumpus – saxophone, keyboards, vocals	none
July 1987 – June 1989	Tom Johnston – lead vocals, guitar; Patrick Simmons – lead vocals, guitar, banjo; Tiran Porter – bass, backing vocals; John Hartman – drums, backing vocals; Michael Hossack – drums, percussion; Bobby LaKind – percussion, backing vocals	Cycles (1989)
June – September 1989	Tom Johnston – lead vocals, guitar; Patrick Simmons – lead vocals, guitar, banjo; Tiran Porter – bass, backing vocals; John Hartman – drums, backing vocals; Michael Hossack – drums, percussion; Bobby LaKind – percussion, backing vocals; Cornelius Bumpus – saxophone, keyboards; with: Dale Ockerman – keyboards, vocals (touring member)	none
September – December 1989	Tom Johnston – lead vocals, guitar; Patrick Simmons – lead vocals, guitar, banjo; Tiran Porter – bass, backing vocals; John Hartman – drums, backing vocals; Michael Hossack – drums, percussion; Cornelius Bumpus – saxophone, keyboards; with: Dale Ockerman – keyboards, vocals (touring member); Richard Bryant – percussion, vocals (touring member); Jimi Fox – percussion, vocals (touring member)	none
December 1989 – November 1991	Tom Johnston – lead vocals, guitar; Patrick Simmons – lead vocals, guitar, banjo; Tiran Porter – bass, backing vocals; John Hartman – drums, backing vocals; Michael Hossack – drums, percussion; with: Dale Ockerman – keyboards, vocals (touring member); Richard Bryant – percussion, vocals (touring member); Jimi Fox – percussion, vocals (touring member)	Brotherhood (1991)
Band inactive November 1991 – October 1992
October 1992 (two shows)	Tom Johnston – lead vocals, guitar; Patrick Simmons – lead vocals, guitar, banjo; Michael McDonald – lead vocals, keyboards; Jeff Baxter – guitar, pedal steel guitar; Tiran Porter – bass, backing vocals; John Hartman – drums, backing vocals; Michael Hossack – drums, percussion; Bobby LaKind – percussion, backing vocals; Cornelius Bumpus – saxophone, keyboards	none
Band inactive October 1992 – summer 1993
Summer – fall 1993	Tom Johnston – lead vocals, guitar; Patrick Simmons – lead vocals, guitar, banjo; John McFee – guitar, violin, backing vocals; Willie Weeks – bass, backing vocals; Michael Hossack – drums, percussion; Keith Knudsen – drums, percussion, vocals; Cornelius Bumpus – saxophone, keyboards; with: Dale Ockerman – keyboards, vocals (touring member)	none
Fall 1993 – early 1995	Tom Johnston – lead vocals, guitar; Patrick Simmons – lead vocals, guitar, banjo; John McFee – guitar, violin, backing vocals; Michael Hossack – drums, percussion; Keith Knudsen – drums, percussion, vocals; with: John Cowan – bass, backing vocals (touring member); Dale Ockerman – keyboards, vocals (touring member); Danny Hull – saxophone, keyboards (touring member)	none
Early 1995 – summer 1996	Tom Johnston – lead vocals, guitar; Patrick Simmons – lead vocals, guitar, banjo; Michael McDonald – lead vocals, keyboards; John McFee – guitar, violin, backing vocals; Michael Hossack – drums, percussion; Keith Knudsen – drums, percussion, vocals; Cornelius Bumpus – saxophone, keyboards; with: Skylark – bass, backing vocals (touring member); Dale Ockerman – keyboards, vocals (touring member); Danny Hull – saxophone, keyboards (touring member)	Rockin' Down the Highway: The Wildlife Concert (1996)
Summer 1996 – summer 1998	Tom Johnston – lead vocals, guitar; Patrick Simmons – lead vocals, guitar, banjo; John McFee – guitar, violin, backing vocals; Michael Hossack – drums, percussion; Keith Knudsen – drums, percussion, vocals; with: Skylark – bass, backing vocals (touring member); Guy Allison – keyboards, vocals (touring member); Danny Hull – saxophone, keyboards (touring member)	none
Summer 1998 – June 2001	Tom Johnston – lead vocals, guitar; Patrick Simmons – lead vocals, guitar, banjo; John McFee – guitar, violin, backing vocals; Michael Hossack – drums, percussion; Keith Knudsen – drums, percussion, vocals; with: Skylark – bass, backing vocals (touring member); Guy Allison – keyboards, vocals (touring member); Marc Russo – saxophone (touring member)	Sibling Rivalry (2000)
June 2001 – February 2005	Tom Johnston – lead vocals, guitar; Patrick Simmons – lead vocals, guitar, banjo; John McFee – guitar, violin, backing vocals; Michael Hossack – drums, percussion; Keith Knudsen – drums, percussion, vocals; with: Skylark – bass, backing vocals (touring member); Guy Allison – keyboards, vocals (touring member); M.B. Gordy – percussion, drums (touring member); Marc Russo – saxophone (touring member)	Live at Wolf Trap (2004)
April 2005 – spring 2010	Tom Johnston – lead vocals, guitar; Patrick Simmons – lead vocals, guitar, banjo; John McFee – guitar, violin, backing vocals; Michael Hossack – drums, percussion; with: Skylark – bass, backing vocals (touring member); Guy Allison – keyboards, vocals (touring member); Ed Toth – drums, percussion (touring member); Marc Russo – saxophone (touring member)	none
Spring 2010 – March 2012	Tom Johnston – lead vocals, guitar; Patrick Simmons – lead vocals, guitar, banjo; John McFee – guitar, violin, backing vocals; Michael Hossack – drums, percussion; with: John Cowan – bass, backing vocals (touring member); Guy Allison – keyboards, vocals (touring member); Ed Toth – drums, percussion (touring member); Tony Pia – drums, percussion (touring member); Marc Russo – saxophone (touring member)	World Gone Crazy (2010)
March 2012 – November 2015	Tom Johnston – lead vocals, guitar; Patrick Simmons – lead vocals, guitar, banjo; John McFee – guitar, violin, backing vocals; Michael McDonald – keyboards, vocals (studio only, seven tracks on Southbound (2014)); with: John Cowan – bass, backing vocals (touring member); Guy Allison – keyboards, vocals (touring member); Ed Toth – drums, percussion (touring member); Tony Pia – drums, percussion (touring member); Marc Russo – saxophone (touring member)	Southbound (2014)
November 2015 – summer 2016	Tom Johnston – lead vocals, guitar; Patrick Simmons – lead vocals, guitar, banjo; John McFee – guitar, violin, backing vocals; with: John Cowan – bass, backing vocals (touring member); Bill Payne – keyboards, vocals (touring member); Ed Toth – drums, percussion (touring member); Tony Pia – drums, percussion (touring member); Marc Russo – saxophone (touring member)	none
Summer 2016 – May 2018	Tom Johnston – lead vocals, guitar; Patrick Simmons – lead vocals, guitar, banjo; John McFee – guitar, violin, backing vocals; with: John Cowan – bass, backing vocals (touring member); Bill Payne – keyboards, vocals (touring member); Ed Toth – drums, percussion (touring member); Marc Russo – saxophone (touring member)	none
May 2018 – November 2019	Tom Johnston – lead vocals, guitar; Patrick Simmons – lead vocals, guitar, banjo; John McFee – guitar, violin, backing vocals; with: John Cowan – bass, backing vocals (touring member); Bill Payne – keyboards, vocals (touring member); Ed Toth – drums, percussion (touring member); Marc Quiñones – percussion, vocals (touring member); Marc Russo – saxophone (touring member)	Live from the Beacon Theatre (2019)
November 2019 – November 2021	Tom Johnston – lead vocals, guitar; Patrick Simmons – lead vocals, guitar, banjo; Michael McDonald – lead vocals, keyboards, mandolin; John McFee – guitar, violin, backing vocals; with: John Cowan – bass, backing vocals (touring member); Bill Payne – keyboards, vocals (touring member); Ed Toth – drums, percussion (touring member); Marc Quiñones – percussion, vocals (touring member); Marc Russo – saxophone (touring member)	Liberté (2021)
November 2021 – present	Tom Johnston – lead vocals, guitar; Patrick Simmons – lead vocals, guitar, banjo; Michael McDonald – lead vocals, keyboards, mandolin; John McFee – guitar, violin, backing vocals; with: John Cowan – bass, backing vocals (touring member); Ed Toth – drums, percussion (touring member); Marc Quiñones – percussion, vocals (touring member); Marc Russo – saxophone (touring member)	Walk This Road (2025)
