= Best of The Doobies =

Greatest hits album by the Doobie Brothers
- Released: October 29, 1976
- Recorded: 1972–1976
- Genres: Rock, pop
- Length: 45:08
- Label: Warner Bros.
- Producer: Ted Templeman

The Doobie Brothers chronology
Takin' It to the Streets (1976)	Best of The Doobies (1976)	Livin' on the Fault Line (1977)

Professional ratings
Review scores
Source	Rating
AllMusic	4.5/5 stars
Christgau's Record Guide	B+
Encyclopedia of Popular Music	3/5 stars
The Great Rock Discography	8/10
MusicHound Rock	3.5/5
Rolling Stone	3.5/5 stars
The Rolling Stone Album Guide	4/5 stars

Best of The Doobies is the first greatest hits album by the Doobie Brothers. The album has material from Toulouse Street through Takin' It to the Streets, and is also a diamond record. The album was released by Warner Bros. Records on October 29, 1976, and has been re-released numerous times.

== Track listing ==
Side one
No.	Title	Writer(s)	Original album	Length
1.	"China Grove"	Tom Johnston	The Captain and Me	3:14
2.	"Long Train Runnin'"	Johnston	The Captain and Me	3:23
3.	"Takin' It to the Streets"	Michael McDonald	Takin' It to the Streets	3:36
4.	"Listen to the Music"	Johnston	Toulouse Street	3:49
5.	"Black Water"	Patrick Simmons	What Were Once Vices Are Now Habits	4:14
6.	"Rockin' Down the Highway"	Johnston	Toulouse Street	3:19

Side two
No.	Title	Writer(s)	Original album	Length
7.	"Jesus Is Just Alright"	Arthur Reid Reynolds	Toulouse Street	4:30
8.	"It Keeps You Runnin'"	McDonald	Takin' It to the Streets	4:20
9.	"South City Midnight Lady"	Simmons	The Captain and Me	5:27
10.	"Take Me in Your Arms"	Holland-Dozier-Holland	Stampede	3:39
11.	"Without You"	John Hartman, Michael Hossack, Johnston, Tiran Porter, Simmons (Note: On both the original album (The Captain and Me) and this compilation, this song is credited to "The Doobie Brothers", rather than to individual band members, even though the band's lineup had changed in between the releases. The live album Rockin' Down the Highway: The Wildlife Concert credits the song to Johnston only.)	The Captain and Me	4:58

== Personnel ==
=== The Doobie Brothers ===
- Tom Johnston – lead (1–2, 4, 6, 10–11) and backing vocals, guitars, harmonica (2)
- Patrick Simmons – lead (4–5, 7, 9) and backing vocals, guitars, banjo (4), ARP synthesizer (9)
- Jeff "Skunk" Baxter – guitars, pedal steel guitar (9)
- Michael McDonald – lead (3, 8) and backing vocals, keyboards, synthesizer (8)
- Tiran Porter – backing vocals, bass guitar
- John Hartman – drums, percussion
- Michael Hossack – drums, percussion
- Keith Knudsen – backing vocals, drums, percussion

=== Additional personnel ===
- Bill Payne – piano (1, 6, 9–10), organ (7, 11)
- Jesse Butler – organ (3)
- Malcolm Cecil – ARP synthesizer programming (9)
- Robert Margouleff – ARP synthesizer programming (9)
- Ted Templeman – backing vocals (11), percussion
- Bobby LaKind – congas (3)
- Milt Holland – vibraphone (5)
- Bobbye Hall – congas (10)
- The Memphis Horns – horns (3)
- Novi Novog – viola (5)
- Sherlie Matthews – backing vocals (10)
- Venetta Fields – backing vocals (10)
- Jessie Smith – backing vocals (10)
- Nick DeCaro – string arrangement (9)
- Paul Riser – string and horn arrangements (10)

== Charts ==
=== Weekly charts ===
Weekly chart performance for Best of The Doobies
Chart (1976–1977)	Peak position
Australian Albums (Kent Music Report)	42
Canada Top Albums/CDs (RPM)	3
New Zealand Albums (RMNZ)	13
US Billboard 200	5

=== Year-end charts ===
Year-end chart performance for Best of The Doobies
Chart (1977)	Position
Canada Top Albums/CDs (RPM)	32
US Billboard 200	30

== Certifications ==
Certifications for Best of The Doobies
Region	Certification	Certified units/sales
Australia (ARIA)	3× Platinum	210,000^{^}
Canada (Music Canada)	2× Platinum	200,000^{^}
United States (RIAA)	10× Platinum	10,000,000^{^}
^{^} Shipments figures based on certification alone.

== See also ==
- List of best-selling albums in the United States
