= Echoes of Love (The Doobie Brothers song) =

- Japan picture sleeve

Single by The Doobie Brothers

from the album Livin' on the Fault Line
- B-side: "There's a Light"
- Released: September 21, 1977
- Recorded: 1977
- Studio: Sunset Sound Recorders, Hollywood, CA
- Genre: Pop rock, soft rock
- Length: 2:57
- Label: Warner Bros.
- Songwriters: Patrick Simmons, Willie Mitchell, Earl Randle
- Producer: Ted Templeman

The Doobie Brothers singles chronology
"Little Darling (I Need You)" (1977)	"Echoes of Love" (1977)	"Nothin' But a Heartache" (1977)

"Echoes of Love" is a song by the American rock band The Doobie Brothers. The song was written by band member Patrick Simmons in collaboration with Willie Mitchell and Earl Randle. This song served as the second single from their seventh studio album Livin' on the Fault Line.

== Background ==
Simmons had originally intended the song for Al Green, with whom both Mitchell and Randle had worked in the past. After the three of them completed the track, Green opted not to use it, resulting in Simmons keeping it for the Doobies' next album.

Cash Box said that "an unusual, synthesized introduction instantly lends a warm feeling" and that it contains "deep layers of vocal harmony." Record World said that the song "emphasizes synthesizer work and vocal harmonies, and bears [the Doobie Brothers'] melodic trademarks."

== Personnel ==
- Patrick Simmons – lead vocals, guitar
- Michael McDonald – backing vocals, keyboards, synthesizer
- Jeff Baxter – guitar
- Tiran Porter – backing vocals, bass
- Keith Knudsen – backing vocals, drums
- John Hartman – drums

=== Additional Personnel ===
- Bobby LaKind – backing vocals, congas
- Ted Templeman – percussion

== Charts ==
Year	Single	Chart	Position
1977	"Echoes of Love"	Pop Singles	66

== Other Versions ==
- The track was later covered by The Pointer Sisters on their 1978 album Energy. The two groups also performed it together in concert the following year.
