= Little Darling (I Need You) =

1966 single by Marvin Gaye

Single by Marvin Gaye

from the album Moods of Marvin Gaye
- B-side: "Hey Diddle Diddle"
- Released: July 26, 1966
- Recorded: March 22, April 2 and May 6, 1965
- Studio: Hitsville U.S.A., Detroit, Michigan
- Genre: Rhythm and blues, soul, pop rock
- Length: 2:35
- Label: Tamla
- Songwriter: Holland-Dozier-Holland
- Producers: Brian Holland; Lamont Dozier

Marvin Gaye singles chronology
"Take This Heart of Mine" (1966)	"Little Darling (I Need You)" (1966)	"It Takes Two" (1966)

"Little Darling (I Need You)" is a 1966 single written and produced by Holland-Dozier-Holland and recorded and released by Marvin Gaye on the Tamla label.

== Background ==
This song was released after the modest success of the Miracles-produced single "Take This Heart of Mine" in hopes that Gaye's work with the hit-making trio Holland-Dozier-Holland would bring him back to the pop top ten.

Similarly conceived with the same musical background as their previous collaboration, "How Sweet It Is (To Be Loved by You)", the song has the singer declaring to his woman to stay beside him promising her that he'll be "(her) number-one fool".

Billboard described the song as a "swinger that should have no trouble making a rapid chart climb," with "strong material and performance." Cash Box said that it is a "wailing throbber with a built-in zoom quality." Record World said that "The song has danceable beat and is just irresistible."

While it reached the top forty of the Billboard Top R&B Singles chart peaking at number sixteen, it did not perform as well as "Take This Heart of Mine" on the pop charts, peaking at number 47.

== Chart performance ==
Chart (1966)	Peak position
UK Singles (The Official Charts Company)	50
US Billboard Hot 100	47
US Billboard Top Selling R&B Singles	16

=== Marvin Gaye personnel ===
- Marvin Gaye – lead vocals
- The Andantes (Marlene Barrow, Jackie Hicks, Louvain Demps) – backing vocals
- The Funk Brothers and the Detroit Symphony Orchestra – instrumentation

== Doobie Brothers recording ==
"Little Darling (I Need You)"

Single by The Doobie Brothers

from the album Livin' on the Fault Line
- B-side: "Losin' End"
- Released: July 1977
- Studio: Sunset Sound Recorders, Hollywood, California
- Genre: Blue-eyed soul, pop rock
- Length: 3:24 (album version); 2:58 (single version)
- Label: Warner Bros.
- Songwriter: Holland-Dozier-Holland
- Producer: Ted Templeman

The Doobie Brothers singles chronology
"It Keeps You Runnin'" (1976)	"Little Darling (I Need You)" (1977)	"Echoes of Love" (1977)

In 1977, The Doobie Brothers, included their recording on their Livin' on the Fault Line LP. In the US, this recording went to No. 48 on the Hot 100.

=== Chart performance ===
Chart (1977)	Peak position
US Billboard Hot 100	48

=== The Doobie Brothers personnel ===
- Michael McDonald – keyboards, vocals
- Patrick Simmons – guitar, backing vocals
- Jeff "Skunk" Baxter – guitar
- Tiran Porter – bass guitar, backing vocals
- Keith Knudsen – drums, backing vocals
- John Hartman – drums

=== Additional musicians ===
- Ted Templeman – tambourine
- Bobby LaKind – congas, backing vocals
- Rosemary Butler – backing vocals
- David Paich – horn and string arrangement
