= Wheels of Fortune (song) =

- Portuguese cover

Single by The Doobie Brothers

from the album Takin' It to the Streets
- B-side: "Slat Key Soquel Rag"
- Released: August 4, 1976
- Studio: Warner Bros. Studios
- Genre: Pop rock
- Length: 4:57 (album); 3:48 (single)
- Label: Warner Bros.
- Songwriter(s): Patrick Simmons; Jeff Baxter; John Hartman
- Producer(s): Ted Templeman

The Doobie Brothers singles chronology
"Takin' It to the Streets" (1976)	"Wheels of Fortune" (1976)	"It Keeps You Runnin'" (1976)

"Wheels of Fortune" is a song written by Patrick Simmons, Jeff Baxter and John Hartman, and recorded by the Doobie Brothers. The song was released as the second single from their 1976 album Takin' It to the Streets.

== Music and lyrics ==
According to Billboard magazine, "Wheels of Fortune" has a similar theme to Blood, Sweat & Tears' 1969 single "Spinning Wheel." The lyrics describe how the wheels of fortune keep changing so that sometimes you lose and sometimes you win.

Nevada State Journal critic Pat O'Driscoll found "Wheels of Fortune" to be generally in the typical Doobie Brothers' style, with "layers of strumming rhythm guitars", but that it also incorporated jazz elements. J. Greg Robertson of the Hartford Courant similarly found the song to be in the Doobie Brothers' traditional style, with "fast tempo, multiple drumming, standard guitar riffs and group vocals." On the other hand, David Guo of the Pittsburgh Post-Gazette remarked that the song's "warbling and syncopated rhythms" were reminiscent of Steely Dan. Likewise, Terry Anderson of The Daily Journal heard jazz influences from Steely Dan. AllMusic critic Bruce Eder also saw "Wheels of Fortune" as an example of the Doobie Brothers being influenced by Steely Dan.

Patrick Simmons and Tom Johnston shared the lead vocals on "Wheels of Fortune". This was one of Johnston's last lead vocal performances for the Doobie Brothers before being forced to leave the band for health reasons.

== Reception ==
"Wheels of Fortune" was released as the second single from Takin' It to the Streets as a follow-up to the title song. Although the previous single reached No. 13 on the Billboard Hot 100, "Wheels of Fortune" was far less successful, peaking at No. 87.

Billboard rated "Wheels of Fortune as a "worthy follow-up to 'Taking It to the Streets'", describing it as combining "funky instrumental tracks and country-rockish vocalizing into a stunning sound." Los Angeles Times critic Steve Pond found that although it incorporates new elements for the band such as the Steely Dan influences, it was "every bit as appealing as the early hits the Doobies once seemed content to merely rewrite." Despite its lack of chart success, Brian Kay of Classic Rock History rated "Wheels of Fortune" as the Doobie Brothers all-time greatest song, praising its composition, production values and performance. Chris Epting of Ultimate Classic Rock described the song as "powerful."

== Appearances ==
"Wheels of Fortune" was included on the 2007 compilation album The Very Best of the Doobie Brothers.

The Doobie Brothers played "Wheels of Fortune" on Dinah! on July 24, 1976.

== Personnel ==
The Doobie Brothers

- Patrick Simmons – rhythm guitar, lead and backing vocals
- Tom Johnston – co-lead vocals
- Jeff "Skunk" Baxter – lead guitar
- Michael McDonald – electric piano, backing vocals
- Tiran Porter – bass, backing vocals
- John Hartman – drums
- Keith Knudsen – backing vocals

Additional personnel

- The Memphis Horns – horns
- Richie Hayward – drums
- Ted Templeman – percussion
