= Rockin' Down the Highway =

1972 song by the Doobie Brothers

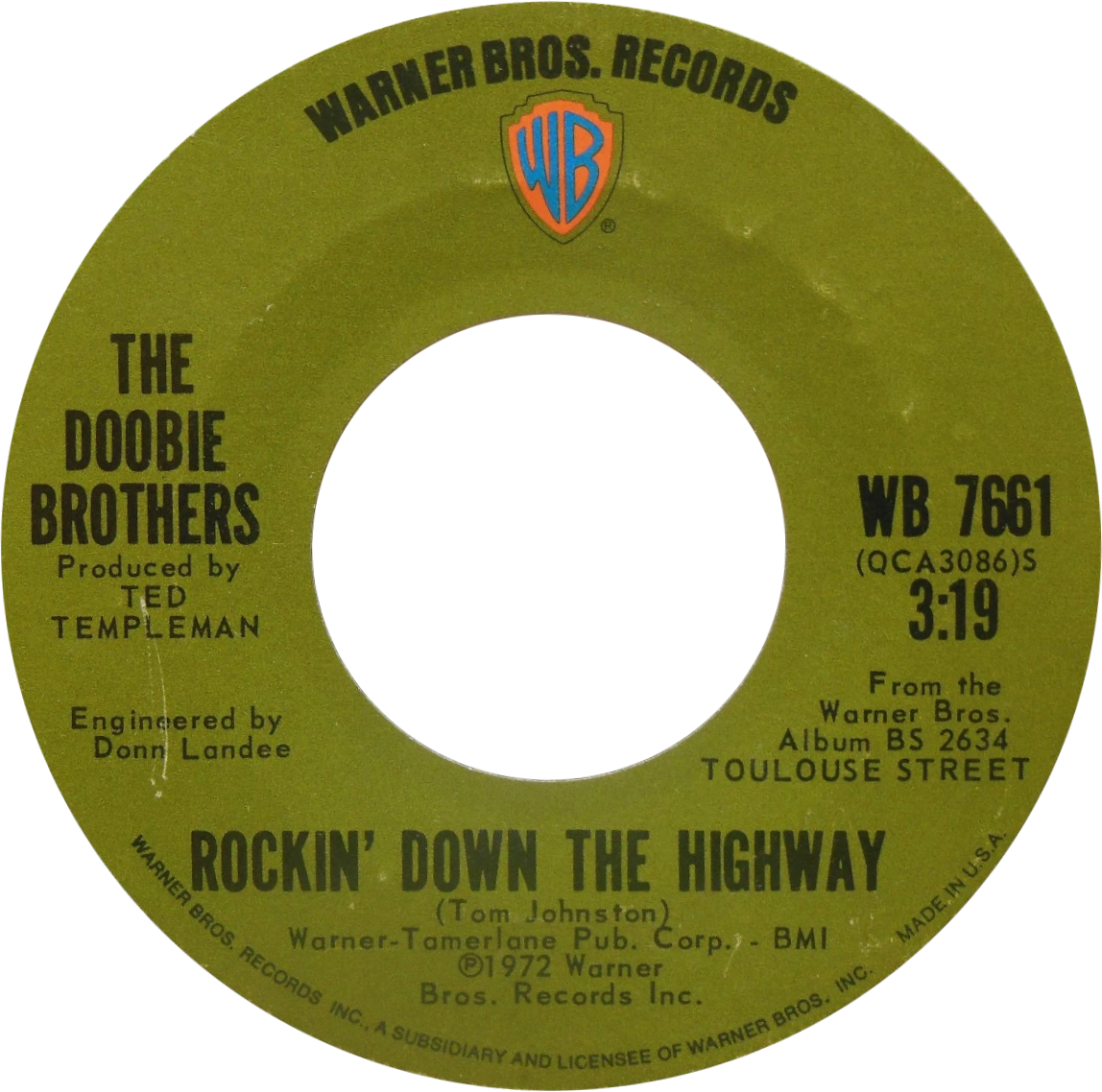
- Side B of the US single

Single by The Doobie Brothers

from the album Toulouse Street
- A-side: "Jesus Is Just Alright"
- Released: November 15, 1972
- Genre: Hard rock
- Length: 3:18
- Label: Warner Bros.
- Songwriter: Tom Johnston
- Producer: Ted Templeman

"Rockin' Down the Highway" is a song written by Tom Johnston that was first released by the American rock band the Doobie Brothers on their second studio album Toulouse Street (1972). It was also released as the B-side to the album's second single "Jesus Is Just Alright" on November 15, 1972.

The song was included on the Doobie Brothers greatest hits albums Best of The Doobies (1976), The Very Best of The Doobie Brothers (1977), Listen to the Music: The Very Best of The Doobie Brothers (1993), and Greatest Hits (2001). A staple of the band's live shows, it was the namesake of the 1996 live album Rockin' down the Highway: The Wildlife Concert. In 2014, the song was re-recorded by the band featuring Brad Paisley for the album Southbound.

== Background ==
Johnston wrote "Rockin' Down the Highway" in a room he was renting in San Jose in which he also wrote the Doobie Brothers' classics "Listen to the Music" and "China Grove".

In an interview with Songfacts, Johnston said of the song:

'Rockin' Down The Highway' was a good times song. It's just what it sounds like. It's about being in a car with the top down flying down the road, which was not uncommon. I lived in San Jose, but I spent a lot of time in the Santa Cruz Mountains and driving up and down Highway 1 down by Santa Cruz. You know, we hadn't signed with a label at that particular time, and I would imagine that the words came out of those experiences: it was footloose, fancy free, and just groovin' up and down the coast, partying. I don't think there was anything more in depth about it as far as the words. I don't think there's any major story to be told there. I mention a motorcycle in there, and it's not a direct mention, but it kind of glances off motorcycling and riding around in cars. I was motorcycle nuts in those days, so there's a reference to that.

Johnston also said:

I think I’d had “Rockin’ Down the Highway,” those chords, for maybe two years. I just hadn’t written the rest of it. I had that before the Doobie Brothers even started. I just never turned it into a song. Eventually, I put in the rest of the chords, which are pretty straight-ahead stuff and turned it into what it became.

Music critic Bud Newman described "Rockin' Down the Highway" as a "rocker" that uses "the same type of lyrical repetition and the same good foot-stamping rhythm" as the Doobie Brothers' hit "Listen to the Music". Berwyn Life critic Steve Sparacio also commented on the stylistic similarity to "Listen to the Music", calling it a "free-wheeling cut." Ultimate Classic Rock critic Matt Wardlaw commented that "when you think of classic Doobie Brothers hits like “Listen to the Music” and “Rockin’ Down the Highway,” the vocal harmonies usually come to mind."

Music professor Drew Nobile noted that the song uses an unusual chord progression. He noted that the progression from the dominant to the subtonic back to the dominant is an atypical progression but is sometimes used because the subtonic is a chromatic third away from the dominant. However, "Rockin' Down the Highway" uses a chord progression that moves from dominant to subtonic to tonic.

Press-Gazette staff writer Mark Moran commented on the importance of the song's "galloping percussion", stating that the song "could easily get stalled in first" without it.

== Reception ==
Although it was not released as a single A-side, "Rockin' Down the Highway" became a popular album-oriented rock radio song.

Writing for Rolling Stone in 1972, Steve Ditlea praised the "piano-driven" "Rockin' Down the Highway" as one of multiple "fine songs" that the Doobie Brothers added to the rock genre on Toulouse Street.

Despite his overall criticism of the album in Musichound Rock: The Essential Album Guide (1996), Gil Asakawa praised the balance of hard rock and folk respectively represented by "Rockin' Down the Highway" and its A-side "Jesus Is Just Alright".

Christian Hoard, writing in The New Rolling Stone Album Guide (2004), was more disparaging of "Rockin' Down the Highway", calling it a "virtual clone" of some of the band's other work, but conceded its undeniable popularity.

In a retrospective review of Toulouse Street for AllMusic, Bruce Eder noted that ""Rockin' Down the Highway" shows the band working at a higher wattage and moving into Creedence Clearwater Revival territory". In another review for AllMusic, Matthew Greenwald praised the song in comparison to the "rock leanings" of Moby Grape and the "on-the-road imagery" of Chuck Berry, calling it "A true good-time rocker, it took the audience back to a more innocent, pre-Beatles era with its infectious, soul-rock-inspired groove."

== Track listing ==
=== 1972 international single ===
- "Jesus Is Just Alright" – 3:50
- "Rockin' Down the Highway" – 3:18

== Personnel ==
- Tom Johnston – lead vocals, acoustic and electric guitars
- Patrick Simmons – backing vocals, acoustic and electric guitars
- Tiran Porter – bass, backing vocals
- John Hartman – drums, percussion
- Michael Hossack – drums
- Bill Payne – piano

== Legacy ==
"Rockin' Down the Highway" was included on the Time-Life various artists compilations Sounds of the Seventies: FM Rock, Vol. 1 (1992) and Guitar Rock: The Early 70's: The Hard Stuff (1995). The melody in the instrumental break of the song was interpolated by Canadian music group Bran Van 3000 in their 2001 song "Astounded". It was the namesake of the 2006 book Rockin' Down the Highway: The Cars and People That Made Rock Roll by Paul Grushkin. The song was also featured in the episode "Devil May Care" of the ninth season of the dark fantasy series Supernatural.
