= List of best-selling albums in the United States =

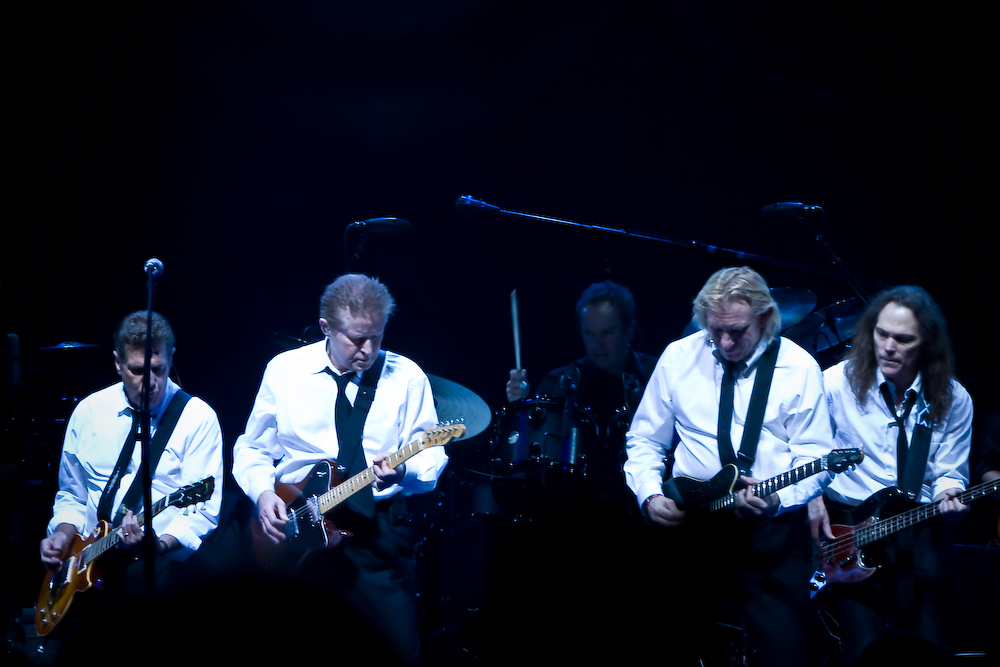
Their Greatest Hits (1971–1975) by the Eagles is the best-selling album of all time in the U.S.

The following is a list of the best-selling albums in the United States based on RIAA certification and Nielsen SoundScan sales tracking. The criteria are that the album must have been published (including self-publishing by the artist), and the album must have achieved at least a diamond certification from the RIAA. The albums released prior to March 1991 should be included with their certified units only, as their Nielsen SoundScan sales are not complete.

Since February 2016, album certifications include "on-demand audio and video streams and a track sale equivalent" units.

Groupings are based on different benchmarks; the highest being for at least 20 million units, and the lowest being for multi-disc albums certified at least 10 times platinum and single-disc albums that have been certified at least 10 times platinum but with sales figures lower than 10,000,000. Albums are listed in order of units certified, or sales figures when available, by greatest to least.

As a result of the RIAA's methodology of counting each disc in a multi-disc set as one unit toward certification, most double albums on the list—such as Pink Floyd's The Wall and Outkast's Speakerboxxx/The Love Below—have been certified with a number double the number of copies sold. Such albums have the shipments of copies, not discs, indicated. Conversely, the certification level for double albums that fit onto one compact disc such as the Saturday Night Fever soundtrack reflect the actual number of copies sold.

The albums in this list are ordered first by number of units, then by platinum awards received, and finally by artist name and album title.

Albums with two references for their estimated actual sales include sales through BMG Music Club. Albums with three references for their estimated actual sales include sales through BMG Music Club and Columbia House.

The best-selling album in the United States is Their Greatest Hits (1971–1975) by the Eagles.

== 20 million or more copies ==
| Year | Artist | Album | Label | Shipments (Sales) | Certification |
|---|---|---|---|---|---|
| 1976 | Eagles | Their Greatest Hits (1971–1975) | Asylum | 40,000,000 | 40× Platinum^{‡} |
| 1982 | Michael Jackson | Thriller | Epic | 34,000,000 | 34× Platinum^{‡} |
| 1976 | Eagles | Hotel California | Asylum | 28,000,000 | 28× Platinum^{‡} |
| 1980 | AC/DC | Back in Black | Atlantic | 27,000,000 | 27× Platinum^{‡} |
| 1971 | Led Zeppelin | Untitled ("Led Zeppelin IV") | Atlantic | 24,000,000 | 24× Platinum^{‡} |
| 1977 | Fleetwood Mac | Rumours | Warner Bros. | 21,000,000 | 21× Platinum^{‡} |

== 15–19 million copies ==
| Year | Artist | Album | Label | Shipments (Sales) | Certification |
|---|---|---|---|---|---|
| 1984 | Bob Marley & The Wailers | Legend | Island | 18,000,000 | 18× Platinum^{‡} |
| 1987 | Guns N' Roses | Appetite for Destruction | Geffen | 18,000,000 | 18× Platinum |
| 1988 | Journey | Greatest Hits | Columbia | 18,000,000 | 18× Platinum^{‡} |
| 1990 | Garth Brooks | No Fences | Capitol Nashville | 18,000,000 | 18× Platinum^{‡} |
| 1991 | Metallica | Metallica | Elektra | (17,810,000) | 20× Platinum^{‡} |
| 1997 | Shania Twain | Come On Over | Mercury Nashville | (17,720,000) | 20× Platinum |
| 1974 | Elton John | Greatest Hits | Polydor | 17,000,000 | 17× Platinum^{‡} |
| 1976 | Boston | Boston | Epic | 17,000,000 | 17× Platinum |
| 1984 | Bruce Springsteen | Born in the U.S.A. | Columbia | 17,000,000 | 17× Platinum^{‡} |
| 1977 | Soundtrack / Bee Gees | Saturday Night Fever | RSO | 16,000,000 | 16× Platinum^{‡} |
| 1978 | Steve Miller Band | Greatest Hits 1974–78 | Capitol | 16,000,000 | 16× Platinum^{‡} |
| 1995 | Alanis Morissette | Jagged Little Pill | Maverick | (15,550,000) | 17× Platinum^{‡} |
| 1973 | Pink Floyd | The Dark Side of the Moon | Harvest/Capitol | 15,000,000 | 15× Platinum |
| 1986 | Bon Jovi | Slippery When Wet | Mercury | 15,000,000 | 15× Platinum^{‡} |

== 10–14 million copies ==
| Year | Artist | Album | Label | Shipments (Sales) | Certification |
|---|---|---|---|---|---|
| 1994 | Hootie & the Blowfish | Cracked Rear View | Atlantic | (14,580,000) | 22× Platinum^{‡} |
| 1971 | Carole King | Tapestry | Ode | 14,000,000 | 14× Platinum^{‡} |
| 1972 | Simon & Garfunkel | Simon and Garfunkel's Greatest Hits | Columbia | 14,000,000 | 14× Platinum |
| 1977 | Meat Loaf | Bat Out of Hell | Epic | 14,000,000 | 14× Platinum |
| 1985 | Whitney Houston | Whitney Houston | Arista | 14,000,000 | 14× Platinum^{‡} |
| 1987 | Soundtrack | Dirty Dancing | RCA | 14,000,000 | 14× Platinum |
| 1999 | Backstreet Boys | Millennium | Jive | (13,890,000) | 13× Platinum |
| 1992 | Soundtrack / Whitney Houston | The Bodyguard | Arista | (13,450,000) | 19× Platinum^{‡} |
| 1999 | Santana | Supernatural | Arista | (13,110,000) | 15× Platinum |
| 2000 | The Beatles | 1 | Apple/EMI/Capitol | (13,000,000) | 11× Platinum (as of 2010) |
| 1978 | Soundtrack | Grease | RSO | 13,000,000 | 13× Platinum^{‡} |
| 1984 | Prince and the Revolution | Purple Rain | Warner | 13,000,000 | 13× Platinum |
| 2000 | Eminem | The Marshall Mathers LP | Aftermath | (12,940,000) | 11× Platinum^{‡} (as of 2022) |
| 2000 | NSYNC | No Strings Attached | Jive | (12,680,000) | 12× Platinum^{‡} |
| 1999 | Britney Spears | ...Baby One More Time | Jive | (12,300,000) | 14× Platinum |
| 2011 | Adele | 21 | Columbia/XL | (12,100,000) | 17× Platinum^{‡} |
| 1968 | The Beatles | The Beatles ("The White Album") | Apple | 12,000,000 | 24× Platinum^{‡} (2-disc album) |
| 1969 | The Beatles | Abbey Road | Apple | 12,000,000 | 12× Platinum |
| 1969 | Led Zeppelin | Led Zeppelin II | Atlantic | 12,000,000 | 12× Platinum |
| 1976 | Creedence Clearwater Revival | Chronicle, Vol. 1 | Fantasy | 12,000,000 | 12× Platinum^{‡} |
| 1977 | Billy Joel | The Stranger | Columbia | 12,000,000 | 12× Platinum^{‡} |
| 1980 | Aerosmith | Greatest Hits | Columbia | 12,000,000 | 12× Platinum^{‡} |
| 1980 | Kenny Rogers | Greatest Hits | Liberty | 12,000,000 | 12× Platinum |
| 1985 | Phil Collins | No Jacket Required | Atlantic | 12,000,000 | 12× Platinum |
| 1987 | Def Leppard | Hysteria | Mercury | 12,000,000 | 12× Platinum |
| 1992 | Kenny G | Breathless | Arista | 12,000,000 | 12× Platinum |
| 2000 | Linkin Park | Hybrid Theory | Warner Bros. | (11,956,000) | 12× Platinum^{‡} |
| 1997 | Backstreet Boys | Backstreet Boys | Jive | (11,920,000) | 14× Platinum |
| 1996 | Celine Dion | Falling into You | Epic | (11,887,000) | 12× Platinum |
| 1999 | Creed | Human Clay | Wind-up | (11,700,000) | 11× Platinum |
| 1991 | Nirvana | Nevermind | DGC | (11,640,000) | 13× Platinum^{‡} |
| 1979 | Pink Floyd | The Wall | Columbia/Harvest | 11,500,000 | 23× Platinum (2-disc album) |
| 1985 | Billy Joel | Greatest Hits – Volume I & Volume II | Columbia | 11,500,000 | 23× Platinum (2-disc album) |
| 1997 | Soundtrack | Titanic | Sony Classical | (11,146,000) | 11× Platinum |
| 2002 | Norah Jones | Come Away with Me | Blue Note | (11,100,000) | 12× Platinum^{‡} |
| 1967 | The Beatles | Sgt. Pepper's Lonely Hearts Club Band | Capitol | 11,000,000 | 11× Platinum |
| 1973 | Led Zeppelin | Houses of the Holy | Atlantic | 11,000,000 | 11× Platinum |
| 1976 | James Taylor | Greatest Hits | Warner Bros. | 11,000,000 | 11× Platinum |
| 1982 | Eagles | Eagles Greatest Hits, Vol. 2 | Asylum | 11,000,000 | 11× Platinum |
| 1987 | Michael Jackson | Bad | Epic | 11,000,000 | 11× Platinum^{‡} |
| 1990 | Madonna | The Immaculate Collection | Sire | 11,000,000 | 11× Platinum^{‡} |
| 1991 | Pearl Jam | Ten | Epic | (10,790,000) | 13× Platinum |
| 1997 | Celine Dion | Let's Talk About Love | Epic | (10,711,000) | 11× Platinum^{‡} |
| 2002 | Eminem | The Eminem Show | Aftermath | (10,700,000) | 12× Platinum^{‡} |
| 1998 | Kid Rock | Devil Without a Cause | Atlantic | (10,610,000) | 11× Platinum |
| 2000 | Britney Spears | Oops!... I Did It Again | Jive | (10,411,000) | 10× Platinum |
| 1998 | NSYNC | *NSYNC | RCA | (10,300,000) | 10× Platinum |
| 2004 | Usher | Confessions | Arista | (10,300,000) | 14× Platinum^{‡} |
| 1998 | Dixie Chicks | Wide Open Spaces | Monument | (10,121,000) | 13× Platinum^{‡} |
| 1994 | Green Day | Dookie | Reprise | (10,005,000) | 20× Platinum^{‡} |
| 1967 | Patsy Cline | Patsy Cline's Greatest Hits | Decca | 10,000,000 | 10× Platinum |
| 1970 | Elvis Presley | Elvis' Christmas Album (budget reissue of 1957 LP with altered track listing) | RCA Camden/Pickwick | 10,000,000 | 10× Platinum |
| 1976 | The Doobie Brothers | Best of The Doobies | Warner Bros. | 10,000,000 | 10× Platinum |
| 1978 | Van Halen | Van Halen | Warner Bros. | 10,000,000 | 10× Platinum |
| 1979 | Michael Jackson | Off the Wall | Epic | 10,000,000 | 10× Platinum^{‡} |
| 1980 | REO Speedwagon | Hi Infidelity | Epic | 10,000,000 | 10× Platinum^{‡} |
| 1981 | Journey | Escape | Columbia | 10,000,000 | 10× Platinum^{‡} |
| 1983 | Def Leppard | Pyromania | Mercury | 10,000,000 | 10× Platinum |
| 1983 | Lionel Richie | Can't Slow Down | Motown | 10,000,000 | 10× Platinum |
| 1983 | ZZ Top | Eliminator | Warner Bros. | 10,000,000 | 10× Platinum |
| 1984 | Soundtrack | Footloose | Columbia | 10,000,000 | 10× Platinum^{‡} |
| 1984 | Madonna | Like a Virgin | Sire | 10,000,000 | 10× Platinum |
| 1984 | Van Halen | 1984 (MCMLXXXIV) | Warner Bros. | 10,000,000 | 10× Platinum |
| 1986 | Beastie Boys | Licensed to Ill | Def Jam | 10,000,000 | 10× Platinum |
| 1987 | Whitney Houston | Whitney | Arista | 10,000,000 | 10× Platinum^{‡} |
| 1987 | George Michael | Faith | Columbia | 10,000,000 | 10× Platinum |
| 1987 | U2 | The Joshua Tree | Island | 10,000,000 | 10× Platinum |
| 1989 | Garth Brooks | Garth Brooks | Capitol | 10,000,000 | 10× Platinum |
| 1990 | MC Hammer | Please Hammer Don't Hurt 'Em | Capitol | 10,000,000 | 10× Platinum |
| 1993 | Garth Brooks | In Pieces | Capitol | 10,000,000 | 10× Platinum^{‡} |

== Fewer than 10 million copies ==
| Year | Artist | Album | Label | Shipments (Sales) | Certification |
|---|---|---|---|---|---|
| 1994 | Boyz II Men | II | Motown | (9,890,000) | 12× Platinum |
| 1991 | Garth Brooks | Ropin' the Wind | Capitol Nashville | (9,600,000) | 14× Platinum |
| 2015 | Adele | 25 | Columbia/XL | (9,600,000) | 12× Platinum^{‡} |
| 1995 | No Doubt | Tragic Kingdom | Trauma/Interscope | (9,520,000) | 10× Platinum |
| 1996 | Matchbox Twenty | Yourself or Someone Like You | Atlantic | (9,358,000) | 12× Platinum |
| 1994 | Bob Seger | Greatest Hits | Capitol | (9,062,000) | 10× Platinum^{‡} |
| 1994 | TLC | CrazySexyCool | LaFace | (8,970,000) | 12× Platinum^{‡} |
| 1995 | Shania Twain | The Woman in Me | Mercury Nashville | (8,894,000) | 12× Platinum |
| 1995 | Jewel | Pieces of You | Atlantic | (8,800,000) | 12× Platinum |
| 2000 | Nelly | Country Grammar | Universal | (8,581,000) | 10× Platinum^{‡} |
| 1995 | Mariah Carey | Daydream | Columbia | (8,505,000) | 11× Platinum |
| 1973 | The Beatles | 1967–1970 | Apple | 8,500,000 | 17× Platinum (2-disc album) |
| 1999 | Dixie Chicks | Fly | Monument | (8,396,000) | 11× Platinum^{‡} |
| 1993 | Tom Petty and the Heartbreakers | Greatest Hits | MCA | (8,200,000) | 12× Platinum |
| 1998 | Lauryn Hill | The Miseducation of Lauryn Hill | Columbia | (8,078,477) | 10× Platinum^{‡} |
| 1993 | Mariah Carey | Music Box | Columbia | (8,012,000) | 10× Platinum |
| 2003 | Evanescence | Fallen | Wind-up | (8,000,000) | 10× Platinum^{‡} |
| 1975 | Led Zeppelin | Physical Graffiti | Swan Song | 8,000,000 | 16× Platinum (2-disc album) |
| 2005 | Nickelback | All the Right Reasons | Roadrunner | (7,960,000) | 10× Platinum^{‡} |
| 1994 | Soundtrack | The Lion King | Walt Disney | (7,879,000) | 10× Platinum |
| 1994 | Garth Brooks | The Hits | Liberty | (7,821,000) | 10× Platinum |
| 1992 | Eric Clapton | Unplugged | Reprise | (7,617,000) | 10× Platinum |
| 1973 | The Beatles | 1962–1966 | Apple | 7,500,000 | 15× Platinum (2-disc album) |
| 2008 | Taylor Swift | Fearless | Big Machine | (7,286,000) | 11× Platinum^{‡} |
| 1996 | Sublime | Sublime | MCA | (7,000,000) | 10× Platinum^{‡} |
| 1997 | The Notorious B.I.G. | Life After Death | Bad Boy/Arista | (6,480,000) | 11× Platinum^{‡} (2-disc album, as of 2018) |
| 2014 | Taylor Swift | 1989 | Big Machine | (6,472,000) | 14× Platinum^{‡} |
| 2003 | Linkin Park | Meteora | Warner Bros. | (6,234,000) | 10× Platinum^{‡} |
| 1998 | Garth Brooks | Double Live | Capitol Nashville | (6,017,000) | 25× Platinum^{‡} (2-disc album) |
| 1971 | The Rolling Stones | Hot Rocks 1964–1971 | London | 6,000,000 | 12× Platinum (2-disc album) |
| 2003 | Outkast | Speakerboxxx/The Love Below | LaFace, Arista | (5,702,000) | 13× Platinum^{‡} (2-disc album) |
| 1994 | Mariah Carey | Merry Christmas | Columbia | (5,700,000) | 10× Platinum^{‡} |
| 1997 | Garth Brooks | Sevens | Capitol | (5,700,000) | 10× Platinum^{‡} |
| 2002 | Shania Twain | Up! | Mercury Nashville | (5,409,000) | 11× Platinum (2-disc album) |
| 1992 | Garth Brooks | The Chase | Liberty | (5,100,000) | 10× Platinum^{‡} |
| 1998 | 2Pac | Greatest Hits | Interscope | (5,100,000) | 10× Platinum (2-disc album) |
| 1976 | Stevie Wonder | Songs in the Key of Life | Motown | 5,000,000 | 10× Platinum (2-disc album) |
| 1985 | The Doors | The Best of The Doors | Elektra | 5,000,000 | 10× Platinum (2-disc album) |
| 1996 | 2Pac | All Eyez On Me | Death Row | 5,000,000 | 10× Platinum (2-disc album) |
| 2007 | Garth Brooks | The Ultimate Hits | Pearl | 5,000,000 | 10× Platinum^{‡} (2-disc album) |
| 1995 | The Smashing Pumpkins | Mellon Collie and the Infinite Sadness | Virgin | (4,900,000) | 11× Platinum^{‡} (2-disc album) |
| 1994 | Soundtrack | Forrest Gump | Epic | (4,400,000) | 12× Platinum (2-disc album) |
| 1986 | Bruce Springsteen | Live/1975–85 | Columbia | 4,333,333 | 13× Platinum (3-disc album) |
| 2019 | Garth Brooks | Triple Live | Pearl | 4,333,333 | 13× Platinum^{‡} (3-disc album) |
| 2013 | Soundtrack | Frozen | Walt Disney | (4,002,000) | 10× Platinum^{‡} |
| 2005 | Eminem | Curtain Call: The Hits | Aftermath | (3,782,000) | 10× Platinum^{‡} |
| 2010 | Katy Perry | Teenage Dream | Capitol | (3,100,000) | 10× Platinum^{‡} |
| 1990 | Led Zeppelin | Led Zeppelin Boxed Set | Atlantic | 2,500,000 | 10× Platinum (4-disc album) |
| 2011 | Drake | Take Care | Young Money/Cash Money/Republic | (2,338,000) | 10× Platinum^{‡} |
| 2016 | Drake | Views | Young Money/Cash Money/Republic | (1,730,000) | 10× Platinum^{‡} |
| 2015 | Cast Recording | Hamilton | Atlantic | (1,970,000) | 10× Platinum^{‡} (2-disc album) |

== Notes ==
- ^{†}Only includes sales tracked by Nielsen SoundScan since March 1, 1991 and BMG Music Club sales, where available.
  When tracking began, Nielsen SoundScan only had about 40% coverage of album sales. SoundScan initially did not track albums sold in supermarkets, and never tracked those sold through mail-order music clubs such as Columbia House or BMG Music Club.
- ^{‡}Album certifications from February 1, 2016 onward include "on-demand audio and video streams and a track sale equivalent."

== See also ==
- List of best-selling singles in the United States
  - List of highest-certified digital singles in the United States
- List of best-selling music artists
  - List of highest-certified music artists in the United States
- List of best-selling albums
  - List of best-selling albums in the United States of the Nielsen SoundScan era
  - List of best-selling albums by year in the United States
  - List of best-selling Latin albums in the United States
  - List of best-selling albums of the 21st century
  - Lists of best-selling albums by country
- List of best-selling films in the United States
