= Takin' It to the Streets (song) =

1976 single by The Doobie Brothers

Single by The Doobie Brothers

from the album Takin' It to the Streets
- B-side: "For Someone Special"
- Released: March 17, 1976
- Recorded: 1975
- Studio: Warner Bros. Studios, North Hollywood, California
- Genre: Blue-eyed soul
- Length: 3:56 (album version); 3:36 (Best of the Doobies version); 3:20 (single version)
- Label: Warner Bros.
- Songwriter: Michael McDonald
- Producer: Ted Templeman

The Doobie Brothers singles chronology
"I Cheat the Hangman" (1975)	"Takin' It to the Streets" (1976)	"Wheels of Fortune" (1976)

"Takin' It to the Streets" is a song by American rock band the Doobie Brothers from the album of the same name. It was their first single with Michael McDonald on vocals and was written by McDonald. The song peaked at number 13 in the US and number 7 in Canada.

== Reception ==
Cash Box stated that "both instrumentally and vocally this is the best thing the Doobie Brothers have done to date," adding that "the melody is based around a strong chordal structure" and that the repetition of the song title in the chorus has "maximum hook potential." Record World said that the song "has all the essential qualities that have contributed to making this group a dominating chart force" and that "all these ingredients are wrapped together in an appealing package."

Ultimate Classic Rock critic Michael Gallucci rated "Takin' It to the Streets" as the Doobie Brothers' 6th greatest song, praising McDonald's "soulful rasp" on the vocal. The staff of Billboard rated it as the Doobie Brothers' 3rd best song, saying that it "hits an elemental theme and drives it home with soulful urgency."

== Personnel ==
- Michael McDonald – piano, lead vocals
- Patrick Simmons – guitar, backing vocals
- Jeff "Skunk" Baxter – guitar
- Tiran Porter – bass, backing vocals
- John Hartman – drums
- Keith Knudsen – drums, backing vocals

Additional personnel

- Jesse Butler – organ
- Bobby LaKind – congas
- Ted Templeman – tambourine, handclaps
- The Memphis Horns – saxophones

== Chart performance ==
=== Weekly charts ===
Chart (1976)	Peak position
Australian (Kent Music Report)	94
Canada RPM Top Singles	7
US Billboard Hot 100	13

=== Year-end charts ===
Chart (1976)	Rank
Canada	86
US (Joel Whitburn's Pop Annual)	111

== Christine Anu and Deni Hines version ==
"Takin' It to the Streets"

Single by Christine Anu and Deni Hines
- Released: November 15, 2008
- Length: 3:33
- Label: Heritage
- Songwriter: Michael McDonald

Christine Anu singles chronology
"Chrissy's Island Family" (2007)	"Takin' It to the Streets" (2008)	"Come Home" (2010)

Deni Hines singles chronology
"I Only Have Eyes for You" (2007)	"Takin' It to the Streets" (2008)	"Love Is in Control (Finger on the Trigger)" (2012)

In November 2008, Australian singers Christine Anu and Deni Hines recorded and released a version of the song. 50% of net profits of the song went to the Salvation Army's Oasis Youth Support Network and the Everyone Is Homeless Fund. Anu and Hines promoted the single with a tour throughout May and June 2009.

=== Track listing ===
1. "Takin It to the Streets" – 3:33
2. "Nak E Ba Na Na" by Christine Anu – 3:01
3. "Freedom" by Deni Hines – 3:43
