= Livin' on the Fault Line =

Studio album by the Doobie Brothers
- Released: August 19, 1977
- Recorded: 1977
- Studios: Sunset Sound Recorders (Hollywood); Western Recorders (Hollywood); Warner Bros. Recording Studios (North Hollywood)
- Genres: Pop rock; soft rock; R&B
- Length: 34:26
- Label: Warner Bros.
- Producer: Ted Templeman

The Doobie Brothers chronology
Best of The Doobies (1976)	Livin' on the Fault Line (1977)	Minute by Minute (1978)

Singles from Livin' on the Fault Line
- 1. "Little Darling (I Need You)" / "Losin' End" Released: July 1977; 2. "Echoes of Love" / "There's a Light" Released: September 21, 1977; 3. "Nothin' But a Heartache" / "Livin' on the Fault Line" Released: November 9, 1977

Livin' on the Fault Line is the seventh studio album by the American rock band the Doobie Brothers. The album was released on August 19, 1977, by Warner Bros. Records. It is one of the few Doobie Brothers albums of the 1970s which did not produce a Top 40 hit on the Billboard Hot 100 (although "You Belong to Me" was a hit as recorded by co-author Carly Simon). Tom Johnston (guitar, vocals) left the band early in the sessions. He is listed as part of the band (appearing in the inside group photo) but appears on little or none of the actual album. He wrote and sang five songs during the sessions for the album, but subsequently quit the band and withdrew his permission for the Doobie Brothers to use these songs. The track "Little Darling (I Need You)" is a remake of the Marvin Gaye 1966 hit.

== Reception ==
Professional ratings
Review scores
Source	Rating
AllMusic	4/5 stars
The Encyclopedia of Popular Music	3/5 stars
The Great Rock Discography	5/10
Rolling Stone	(mixed)
The Rolling Stone Album Guide	2.5/5 stars

Rolling Stone said, "This half-effort lacks the energy of their previous albums. The Doobie Brothers continue to produce smooth, adult rock (more consistently than before, in fact), but without the threat of at least a little bite, their music slips too easily into the background."

== Track listing ==
Side one
No.	Title	Writer(s)	Lead vocals	Length
1.	"You're Made That Way"	Michael McDonald, Jeff Baxter, Keith Knudsen	Michael McDonald	3:30
2.	"Echoes of Love"	Patrick Simmons, Willie Mitchell, Earl Randle	Pat Simmons	2:57
3.	"Little Darling (I Need You)"	Holland–Dozier–Holland	McDonald	3:24
4.	"You Belong to Me"	Carly Simon, McDonald	McDonald	3:04
5.	"Livin' on the Fault Line"	Simmons	Simmons, McDonald	4:42

Side two
No.	Title	Writer(s)	Lead vocals	Length
6.	"Nothin' But a Heartache"	McDonald	McDonald	3:05
7.	"Chinatown"	Simmons	Simmons, McDonald	4:55
8.	"There's a Light"	McDonald	McDonald	4:12
9.	"Need a Lady"	Tiran Porter	Tiran Porter (w/cameos by Simmons, McDonald)	3:21
10.	"Larry the Logger Two-Step"	Simmons	None	1:16

== Personnel ==
=== The Doobie Brothers ===
- Pat Simmons – guitars, lead vocals (2, 5, 7), backing vocals
- Michael McDonald – piano, keyboards, organ, clavinet, synthesizer, lead vocals (1, 3–8), backing vocals
- Jeff Baxter – guitars, Roland guitar synthesizer
- Tiran Porter – bass, lead vocals (9), backing vocals
- Keith Knudsen – drums, percussion, backing vocals
- John Hartman – drums, percussion

Tom Johnston is listed as a band member in the credits but does not play on the album.

==== Additional musicians ====
- Bobby LaKind – congas, backing vocals
- Dan Armstrong – electric sitar solo (9)
- Randy Brecker – trumpet solo (4)
- Norton Buffalo – harmonica (8)
- Victor Feldman – vibes (5)
- Rosemary Butler – backing vocals (3, 4, 8)
- Maureen McDonald – backing vocals (1)
- Ted Templeman – percussion
- David Paich – string and horn arrangements (1, 3, 4, 8), string arrangements (6)

=== Technical ===
- Produced by Ted Templeman
- Engineered by Donn Landee
- Production coordination – Beth Naranjo
- Second engineer – Kent Nebergall
- Cover photography and album design – Bruce Steinberg
- Inner sleeve photo – Michael Zagaris
- Aerial photo pilot – Roger Glenn
- Hand-tinting – Kristin Sundbom
- Management – Bruce Cohn

== Charts ==
Chart (1977)	Peak position
Australia (Kent Music Report)	16
Canada Top Albums/CDs (RPM)	12
New Zealand Albums (RMNZ)	14
Swedish Albums (Sverigetopplistan)	40
UK Albums (Official Charts)	25
US Billboard 200	10
