= Jerry Jumonville =

American saxophonist (1941–2019)

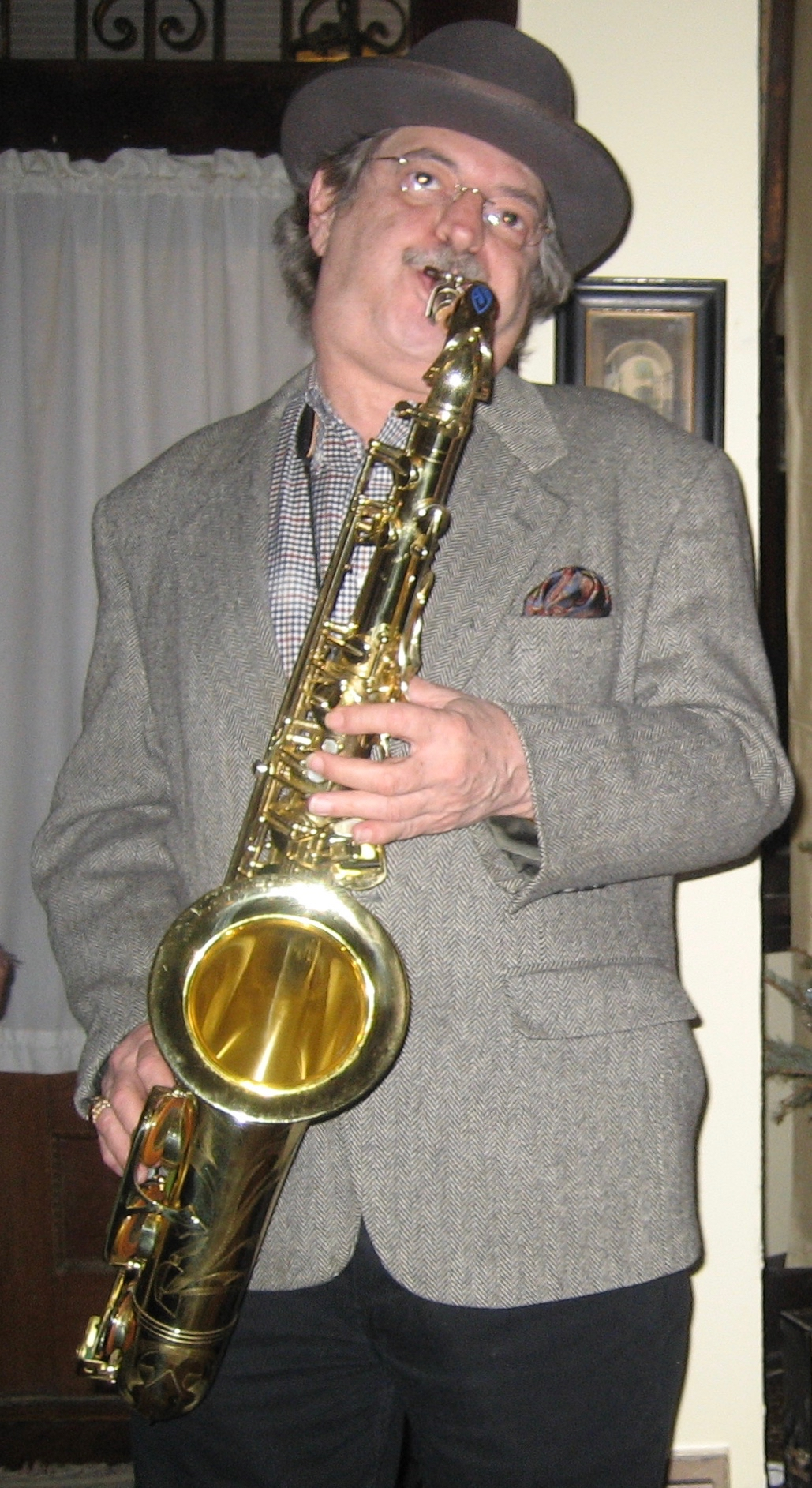
Jumonville in 2008

Jerome Noel Jumonville (December 5, 1941 – December 7, 2019), better known as Jerry Jumonville, was an American jazz, rhythm and blues, and rock and roll saxophonist, arranger, and composer. He began playing the saxophone as teenager. Jumonville was a musician for albums and television series.

== Personal life and early career ==
Jumonville was born on December 5, 1941, as Jerome Noel Jumonville, and he grew up in the Carrollton section of New Orleans. His father was a hobby shop owner. During his summer vacation, before attending his first year of high school, his mother borrowed a saxophone from a friend for Jumonville to play. He played his first alto with that saxophone. As a teenager during the late 1950s, Jumonville was a fan of New Orleans musicians including Fats Domino and Smiley Lewis. He was interested in playing the saxophone due to how prominent it was on many rhythm and blues and bebop jazz records during the 1950s. When he was in high school, Jumonville started a R&B band called the Matadors. Jumonville backed Ray Charles and James Brown while they played in New Orleans.

Jerry was married four times and spent his final years surrounded by many loving friends.

== Professional career ==
Jumonville started his music career by emulating jazz musician David "Fathead" Newman. Jumonville gave credit to Ray Charles for telling him to stop trying to copy Newman, which Jumonville followed. While he was a session musician, Jumonville played the saxophone for Rod Stewart's song "Tonight's the Night (Gonna Be Alright)". He played the saxophone for the soundtrack to the film The Rose, for the album Toulouse Street by The Doobie Brothers, and various other tracks by significant artists. His music was influenced by tenor players Eddie "Lockjaw" Davis and Gene Ammons, as well as swing players Illinois Jacquet and Ben Webster.

When the 1970s television series Happy Days and Laverne & Shirley featured a band, Jumonville was usually part of it. Jumonville was based in Los Angeles for much of the 1960s through the 1980s. His album Jump City was released in 1986. Jumonville's 2004 recordings for the 2008 album You Are My Dream were not destroyed during Hurricane Katrina due to the ADAT tapes being up high in a recording studio. After returning to New Orleans, he frequently played in local clubs.

== Death ==
Jumonville died on December 7, 2019, in New Orleans. A celebration of his life was held at Buffa's Bar and Restaurant on December 21, 2019.
