= Brotherhood (The Doobie Brothers album) =

Studio album by The Doobie Brothers
- Released: April 15, 1991
- Recorded: 1990
- Studio: The Plant, Sausalito, CA, Except A4: recorded & mixed Image Recording, Hollywood, CA.
- Genre: Rock
- Length: 44:52
- Label: Capitol
- Producer: Rodney Mills

The Doobie Brothers chronology
Cycles (1989)	Brotherhood (1991)	Listen to the Music: The Very Best of The Doobie Brothers (1993)

Professional ratings
Review scores
Source	Rating
AllMusic	2.5/5 stars
The Rolling Stone Album Guide	2/5 stars

Brotherhood is the eleventh studio album by American rock band The Doobie Brothers. The album was released on April 15, 1991, by Capitol Records. It was their second and final album for Capitol. It also marked the final appearances on a Doobie Brothers album by bassist Tiran Porter and original drummer John Hartman.

Four of the ten tracks were written entirely by outside musicians, though two of these, songwriter Jerry Lynn Williams and Jim Peterik of Survivor, also collaborated with Tom Johnston and Patrick Simmons on some of their compositions.

The album contained no major hit singles, but "Dangerous", Simmons' anthem to his passion for Harley-Davidson motorcycles, peaked at #2 on the Hot Mainstream Rock Tracks chart and is still performed live by the band. Johnston's "Rollin' On" charted at #12 on the same listing.

== Aftermath ==
The album was a critical and commercial failure, stalling at #82. Shortly after the album's release, the band was dropped by Capitol. There was also a shift in personnel as Tiran Porter left to pursue a brief solo career, frustrated that his own compositions were deemed unsuitable for the band, while John Hartman quit music altogether. Two other former members, drummer Keith Knudsen and guitarist John McFee, were recruited, but for the next nine years, the band concentrated entirely on live work, frustrated by the lack of support they had received from Capitol. The Doobie Brothers would not release another studio album until Sibling Rivalry in 2000, a period of time that was three years longer than the gap between the Doobies' "Farewell Tour" album and Cycles, their reunion album with Tom Johnston.

== Track listing ==
No.	Title	Writer(s)	Length
1.	"Something You Said"	Michael Lunn, Alan Gorrie	4:48
2.	"Is Love Enough"	Jerry Lynn Williams, Walt Richmond	4:40
3.	"Dangerous"	Patrick Simmons	5:06
4.	"Our Love"	Williams	4:32
5.	"Divided Highway"	Simmons, Jimi Fox, Jim Peterik	3:50
6.	"Under the Spell"	Peterik, Bill Syniar, Paul Wertico	4:23
7.	"Excited"	Tom Johnston, Williams	5:02
8.	"This Train I'm On"	Simmons, Dale Ockerman	3:55
9.	"Showdown"	Johnston	4:20
10.	"Rollin' On"	Johnston	4:15

== Personnel ==
The Doobie Brothers

- Tom Johnston – guitars, vocals
- Patrick Simmons – guitars, vocals
- Tiran Porter – bass, vocals
- John Hartman – drums
- Michael Hossack – drums, percussion

Additional players

- Steve Canali – slide guitar
- Jimi Fox – percussion
- Dale Ockerman – keyboards
- Richard Bryant – background vocals
- Vicki Randle – background vocals
- Rem Smiers – background vocals

== Production ==
- Producer and Engineer – Rodney Mills
- Assistant Producer – Kathy Nelson
- Co-Engineer – Devon Rietveld
- Mixing – Rodney Mills and Chris Lord-Alge
- Recorded and Mixed at The Record Plant (Sausalito, California); Track 4 recorded and mixed at Image Recording Studios (Hollywood).
- Mastered by Bob Ludwig at Masterdisk (New York).
- Design – John Kehe
- Photography – Peter Darley Miller
- Front Cover Photo – Robert Doisneau
- Art Direction – Tommy Steele
- Management – Bruce Cohn
- Tour Manager – Tim McCormick

== Charts ==
Chart (1991)	Peak position
Canada (RPM)	18
US (Billboard 200)	82
