= It Keeps You Runnin' =

1976 single by the Doobie Brothers

- Side A of the original US single

Single by The Doobie Brothers

from the album Takin' It to the Streets
- B-side: "Turn It Loose"
- Released: October 5, 1976
- Recorded: 1975
- Studio: Warner Bros. Studios, North Hollywood, California
- Genre: Blue-eyed soul
- Length: 4:20 (Album version); 4:07 (Single version)
- Label: Warner Bros.
- Songwriter: Michael McDonald
- Producer: Ted Templeman

The Doobie Brothers singles chronology
"Wheels of Fortune" (1976)	"It Keeps You Runnin'" (1976)	"Little Darling (I Need You)" (1977)

"It Keeps You Runnin'" is a song by the American rock band The Doobie Brothers. It was written by band member Michael McDonald, and served as the third single from their sixth studio album Takin' It to the Streets (1976). It was also covered by Carly Simon the same year and released as the lead single from her sixth studio album Another Passenger.

The Doobie Brothers' version was featured in the 1994 Oscar-winning film Forrest Gump, and was included on the film's multi-platinum selling soundtrack album.

The song was also featured in the soundtrack of the 1978 film FM.

== Lyrics and music ==
According to AllMusic critic Jason Elias, the music of "It Keeps You Runnin'" reflects a "jazzy R&B influence" and "gospel-based keyboard shading."

Elias described the lyrics as the singer "trying to talk some woman into listening to what her heart is trying to say -- the oldest trick in the book."

== Reception ==
Ultimate Classic Rock critic Michael Gallucci rated "It Keeps You Runnin'" as the Doobie Brothers' 10th greatest song, describing it as being "California-funky."

== Track listing ==
7" single

1. "It Keeps You Runnin'" – 4:07
2. "Turn It Loose" – 3:53

== Personnel ==
- Michael McDonald – keyboards, vocals
- Patrick Simmons – guitar, backing vocals
- Jeff "Skunk" Baxter – guitar
- Tiran Porter – bass, backing vocals
- Keith Knudsen – drums, backing vocals
- John Hartman – drums

=== Additional Personnel ===
- Ted Templeman – percussion, producer
- Bobby LaKind – congas

== Charts ==
Chart (1977)	Peak position
Canada Top Singles (RPM)	39
Billboard Pop Singles (Hot 100)	37

== Carly Simon version ==
"It Keeps You Runnin'"
- UK single sleeve

Single by Carly Simon

from the album Another Passenger
- B-side: "Look Me in the Eyes" (US); "Be With Me" (UK)
- Released: May 1976
- Recorded: Early–mid 1976
- Genre: Rock, blue-eyed soul
- Length: 3:56
- Label: Elektra
- Songwriter: Michael McDonald
- Producer: Ted Templeman

Carly Simon singles chronology
"Waterfall" (1975)	"It Keeps You Runnin'" (1976)	"Half a Chance" (1976)

American singer-songwriter and musician Carly Simon covered "It Keeps You Runnin'" for her sixth studio album Another Passenger, and the song served as the lead single the month prior, the first version of the song to be released as a single. Simon's version charted on both the Billboard Pop singles (Hot 100) chart and the Billboard Adult Contemporary chart.

The Doobie Brothers played and provided backing vocals on the track. Ted Templeman produced both Simon's and The Doobie's versions, as well as each of their albums from which the song is featured.

=== Reception ===
Billboard described it as an "interesting mid -tempo rocker" with a "jazzy feel" that has a powerful vocal performance by Simon. Billboard specifically praised the guitar playing and the hook. Cash Box said that Simon's "vocal is always clean and sensuous, and sensitive to the excellent backing," calling the song "an upbeat cut, with attractive chord changes and hook-filled lyric." Record World called it "a refreshing change of pace for the songstress who sounds very comfortable with the palpitating percussive Doobies beat."

=== Personnel ===
- Carly Simon – lead vocals, backing vocals
- Michael McDonald – keyboards
- Jeff Baxter – slide guitar
- Patrick Simmons – electric guitar
- Tiran Porter – bass
- John Hartman – drums
- Keith Knudsen – drums
- The Doobie Brothers – backing vocals

=== Track listing ===
7" single (US)

1. "It Keeps You Runnin'" – 3:56
2. "Look Me In The Eyes" – 3:34

7" single (UK)

1. "It Keeps You Runnin'" – 3:56
2. "Be with Me" – 1:53

=== Charts ===
Chart (1976)	Peak position
Canada (RPM)	47
US Billboard Pop Singles (Hot 100)	46
US Billboard Adult Contemporary	27
