= What Were Once Vices Are Now Habits =

Studio album by The Doobie Brothers
- Released: February 1, 1974
- Recorded: 1973
- Studios: Warner Bros. Studios, North Hollywood; Wally Heider Studios, San Francisco; Burbank Studios, Burbank
- Genres: Hard rock; country rock
- Length: 44:29
- Label: Warner Bros.
- Producer: Ted Templeman

The Doobie Brothers chronology
The Captain and Me (1973)	What Were Once Vices Are Now Habits (1974)	Stampede (1975)

Singles from What Were Once Vices Are Now Habits
- 1. "Another Park, Another Sunday" Released: March 13, 1974; 2. "Eyes of Silver" Released: June 26, 1974; 3. "Black Water" Released: November 15, 1974

Professional ratings
Review scores
Source	Rating
AllMusic	3.5/5 stars
Christgau's Record Guide	C−
The Encyclopedia of Popular Music	3/5 stars
The Great Rock Discography	6/10
Rolling Stone	(mixed)
The Rolling Stone Album Guide	2.5/5 stars

What Were Once Vices Are Now Habits is the fourth studio album by American rock band the Doobie Brothers. The album was released on February 1, 1974, by Warner Bros. Records.

== Recording and content ==
Tom Johnston's "Another Park, Another Sunday" was the album's first single. "It's about losing a girl," stated Johnston. "I wrote the chords and played it on acoustic, and then Ted [Templeman] had some ideas for it, like running the acoustic guitar through a Leslie." The song did moderately well on the charts, peaking at No. 32. Record World said that it was "more melodic and easy-tempoed [than previous Doobie Brothers' hits], in tune with the pastoral weekend setting."

The second single released was "Eyes of Silver", another Johnston-penned tune. According to him, "Wordwise, that one really isn't that spectacular. I wrote them at the last minute." Cash Box said that it was "very similar to their smash 'Listen To The Music'" and "features every lick the Doobies have featured in their great patented sound". Record World said that the group was "back into their chuggin' folk-rock groove, fitting more easily into their 'Listen to the Music' bag". That song did not have much success on the charts either, peaking at only No. 52.

Grasping for chart action, Warner Brothers re-released the band's first single, "Nobody", backed with Tiran Porter's instrumental "Flying Cloud". This release was soon overshadowed when radio stations discovered "Black Water". Other stations joined in and the song was officially released as a single that went on to sell over a million copies and became the Doobie Brothers' first No. 1 hit. "Black Water" had been featured as the B-side of "Another Park, Another Sunday" eight months earlier.

== Artwork ==
The unusual lettering on the album cover was suggested by drummer John Hartman after visiting his high school alma mater, J.E.B. Stuart in Falls Church, Virginia. The school's newspaper, Raiders Digest, had just changed its masthead to include those stylized fonts. The cover photo is by Dan Fong, their touring Media Coordinator. The cover photo was taken at a concert on December 4, 1973, at E.A. Diddle Arena, Western Kentucky University, Bowling Green, Kentucky. He also did the cover photo for their album Takin' It to the Streets.

== Track listing ==
Side one
No.	Title	Writer(s)	Length
1.	"Song to See You Through"	Tom Johnston	4:06
2.	"Spirit"	Johnston	3:15
3.	"Pursuit on 53rd St."	Johnston	2:33
4.	"Black Water"	Patrick Simmons	4:15
5.	"Eyes of Silver"	Johnston	2:57
6.	"Road Angel"	John Hartman, Michael Hossack, Johnston, Tiran Porter	4:49

Side two
No.	Title	Writer(s)	Length
7.	"You Just Can't Stop It"	Simmons	3:28
8.	"Tell Me What You Want (And I'll Give You What You Need)"	Simmons	3:53
9.	"Down in the Track"	Johnston	4:15
10.	"Another Park, Another Sunday"	Johnston	4:27
11.	"Daughters of the Sea"	Simmons	4:29
12.	"Flying Cloud"	Porter	2:00

== Personnel ==
=== The Doobie Brothers ===
- Tom Johnston – guitars, lead vocals (1–3, 5, 6, 9, 10), backing vocals
- Patrick Simmons – guitars, lead vocals (4, 7, 8, 11), backing vocals
- Tiran Porter – bass, backing vocals
- John Hartman – drums, percussion
- Michael Hossack – drums (Note: Hossack left the band after recording his drum parts and was replaced by Knudsen. In spite of not actually playing drums on it, Knudsen was officially considered a full member for the album, being pictured along with the other Doobie Brothers on the cover, while Hossack was listed in the credits as a guest musician.)

Keith Knudsen is listed as a band member in the credits but does not play on the album.

==== Additional musicians ====
- Jeff "Skunk" Baxter – pedal steel guitar (8)
- Bill Payne – organ (1, 5), piano (3), clavinet (7)
- James Booker – piano (9)
- Arlo Guthrie – autoharp (8)
- Eddie Guzman – congas (6, 7, 11), timbales (11), and various other percussion instruments
- Milt Holland – tabla (8), vibraphone (4, 8, 10), marimba (11), pandeiro (11), and various other percussion instruments
- The Memphis Horns – horns (1, 5, 7)
  - Wayne Jackson – trumpet, horn arrangements
  - Andrew Love – tenor saxophone, horn arrangements
  - James Mitchell – baritone saxophone
  - Jack Hale – trombone
- Novi Novog – viola (2, 4)
- Ted Templeman – additional percussion
- uncredited – synthesizer (12)

=== Technical ===
- Produced by Ted Templeman
- Engineered by Donn Landee
- Additional engineering – Lee Herschberg
- Mastered by Lee Herschberg
- Production coordinator – Benita Brazier
- Photography – Dan Fong
- Art direction and album design – Chas Barbour for Lotus
- Management – Bruce Cohn

== Charts ==
Chart (1974)	Peak position
Australian (Kent Music Report)	24
Canada (RPM)	13
New Zealand (RIANZ)	17
UK Albums (Official Charts)	19
US (Billboard 200)	4

== Certifications ==
Region	Certification	Certified units/sales
Australia (ARIA)	Gold	20,000^{^}
^{^} Shipments figures based on certification alone.
