= Stampede (The Doobie Brothers album) =

Studio album by the Doobie Brothers
- Released: April 25, 1975
- Recorded: September 9 – October 6, 1974
- Studios: Warner Bros. Studios, North Hollywood; Burbank Studios, Burbank; Curtom Studios, Chicago; The Record Plant, Sausalito; "I Been Workin' on You" recorded at Creative Workshop, Nashville
- Genres: Rock; country rock
- Length: 40:50
- Label: Warner Bros.
- Producer: Ted Templeman

The Doobie Brothers chronology
What Were Once Vices Are Now Habits (1974)	Stampede (1975)	Takin' It to the Streets (1976)

Singles from Stampede
- 1. "Take Me in Your Arms (Rock Me)" / "Slat Key Soquel Rag" Released: April 23, 1975; 2. "Sweet Maxine" / "Double Dealin' Four Flusher" Released: July 8, 1975; 3. "I Cheat the Hangman" / "Music Man" Released: November 12, 1975

Professional ratings
Review scores
Source	Rating
AllMusic	4.5/5 stars
The Encyclopedia of Popular Music	3/5 stars
The Great Rock Discography	5/10
Rolling Stone	(mixed)
The Rolling Stone Album Guide	2/5 stars

Stampede is the fifth studio album by American rock band the Doobie Brothers. The album was released on April 25, 1975, by Warner Bros. Records. It was the final album by the band before Michael McDonald replaced Tom Johnston as lead vocalist and primary songwriter. The album has been certified gold by the RIAA.

== Recording and content ==
Stampede showed the Doobie Brothers diversifying elements of their sound more than ever before, combining elements of their old sound as well as country-rock, funk and folk music. Many guest musicians contributed on the album including Maria Muldaur, Ry Cooder and Curtis Mayfield.

This was the first album featuring Jeff "Skunk" Baxter as a full-fledged member of the band, although he is absent from the cover photo, since it was taken before he joined. He had played on a couple of songs as a guest on the two previous albums and often sat in with the Doobie Brothers during concerts where Baxter's band at the time, Steely Dan, were their opening act.

The first and most successful single released from this album was "Take Me in Your Arms (Rock Me)" on April 23, 1975, a classic Motown tune written by the legendary songwriting trio of Holland-Dozier-Holland. Tom Johnston had wanted to record the song for several years. "I thought that would be a killer track to cover," he said. "It's probably one of my favorite songs of all time. I thought our version came out great."

The next single, released on July 8, 1975, was "Sweet Maxine" which was more akin to the Doobie Brothers' earlier hits style-wise. "Pat wrote the music to this and I wrote the words," Johnston recalled. "And Billy Payne had a lot to do with the sound of the song, because of his incredible keyboard playing." The track stalled at #40 on the Billboard charts. Record World said that "after a barrelhouse piano intro, the boys zoom back into that familiar rockin' groove."

The third and final single was Patrick Simmons' "I Cheat the Hangman", released November 12, 1975. It is a somber outlaw ballad that was inspired by the story An Occurrence at Owl Creek Bridge by Ambrose Bierce. "It's about a ghost returning to his home after the Civil War and not realizing he's dead," said Simmons about the song. The album version of the song is a progressive rock-style composition ending in a twisted collage of strings, horns and synthesizers made to sound like ghostly wails. "We'd cut the track, and we kicked around how to develop the ending—I thought about synthesizers and guitar solos. Ted [Templeman] got to thinking about it, and he ran it past [arranger] Nick DeCaro for some orchestration ideas. 'Night on Bald Mountain' by Mussorgsky really inspired the wildness of the strings, and Nick came up with the chorale thing at the end." The ambitious "I Cheat the Hangman" only managed to reach #60 on the music charts. Cash Box said it was a "rather lengthy piece quite unlike any previous single release from this super-group" and "a low-key ballad carried by a single, melodic voice against flowing guitar picking that grows into beautiful vocal harmony from the group, soon to segue into sustained orchestration holding a sweeping power chord under which some jazz improvisation goes on." Record World said that "the Doobies stretch out with a searing ballad that relies on a strong vocal harmony sound."

"Neal's Fandango" was inspired by the Santa Cruz mountains and was an homage to Neal Cassady, Merry Prankster bus driver and former Jack Kerouac sidekick in On the Road. It was occasionally played on San Francisco Bay Area classic rock station KFOX "K-FOX" (that means KUFX) because of the Doobie Brothers' South Bay roots.

== Track listing ==
Side one
No.	Title	Writer(s)	Lead vocals	Length
1.	"Sweet Maxine"	Tom Johnston, Patrick Simmons	Johnston	4:26
2.	"Neal's Fandango (Note: On all CD reissues this track's length is about 3:09 due to the section before the final guitar solo being edited out.)"	Simmons	Simmons	3:20
3.	"Texas Lullaby"	Johnston	Johnston	5:00
4.	"Music Man"	Johnston	Johnston	3:34
5.	"Slack Key Soquel Rag (Note: This was originally listed incorrectly as "Slat Key Soquel Rag".)"	Simmons	None	1:54

Side two
No.	Title	Writer(s)	Lead vocals	Length
6.	"Take Me in Your Arms (Rock Me)"	Holland–Dozier–Holland	Johnston	3:39
7.	"I Cheat the Hangman"	Simmons	Simmons	6:38
8.	"Précis"	Jeff Baxter	None	0:56
9.	"Rainy Day Crossroad Blues"	Johnston	Johnston	3:45
10.	"I Been Workin' on You"	Johnston	Johnston	4:22
11.	"Double Dealin' Four Flusher"	Simmons	Simmons, Knudsen, Johnston	3:30

== Personnel ==
=== The Doobie Brothers ===
- Tom Johnston – guitars, lead vocals (1, 3, 4, 6, 9–11), backing vocals
- Patrick Simmons – guitars, lead vocals (2, 7, 11), backing vocals
- Jeff "Skunk" Baxter – guitars, pedal steel guitar
- Tiran Porter – bass guitar, backing vocals
- John Hartman – drums, percussion
- Keith Knudsen – drums, percussion, lead vocals (11), backing vocals

==== Additional musicians ====
- Billy Payne – piano (1–3, 6, 7, 11), organ (4, 10), electric piano (11), keyboards
- Ry Cooder – bottleneck guitar (9)
- Maria Muldaur – backing vocals (7)
- Karl Himmel – drums and percussion (10)
- Conte Candoli – trumpet (7)
- Pete Candoli – trumpet (7)
- Bobbye Hall Porter – congas (6)
- Victor Feldman – marimba, percussion
- Harry Bluestone – concertmaster (9)
- Sherlie Matthews – backing vocals (6, 10)
- Venetta Fields – backing vocals (6, 10)
- Jessica Smith – backing vocals (6, 10)
- Curtis Mayfield – string and horn arrangements (4)
- Paul Riser – string and horn arrangements (6), horn arrangements (1, 11)
- Nick DeCaro – string arrangements (3, 7, 9)
- Richard Tufo – orchestration (4)
- Ted Templeman – additional percussion

=== Technical ===
- Produced by Ted Templeman
- Engineered by Donn Landee (1–9, 11) and Travis Turk (10)
- Art direction – Ed Thrasher
- Photography – Michael Maggid and Jill Maggid
- Design – John Casado and Barbara Casado
- Management – Bruce Cohn

== Charts ==
Chart performance for Stampede
Chart (1975)	Peak position
Australian Albums (Kent Music Report)	6
Canadian Albums (RPM)	5
Dutch Albums (Album Top 100)	11
New Zealand Albums (RMNZ)	5
UK Albums (Official Charts)	14
US Billboard 200	4

== Certifications ==
Certifications for Stampede
Region	Certification	Certified units/sales
Australia (ARIA)	Gold	50,000^{^}
^{^} Shipments figures based on certification alone.
