= Toulouse Street =

Studio album by the Doobie Brothers
- Released: July 1, 1972
- Recorded: 1972
- Studios: Warner Bros. Studios, North Hollywood; Wally Heider Studios, San Francisco (tracks 4, 8, 10)
- Genres: Rock; boogie rock; country rock; folk rock
- Length: 35:33
- Label: Warner Bros.
- Producer: Ted Templeman

The Doobie Brothers chronology
The Doobie Brothers (1971)	Toulouse Street (1972)	The Captain and Me (1973)

Singles from Toulouse Street
- 1. "Listen to the Music" / "Toulouse Street" Released: July 19, 1972; 2. "Jesus Is Just Alright" / "Rockin' Down the Highway" Released: November 15, 1972

Toulouse Street is the second studio album by American rock band the Doobie Brothers. It was released in July 1, 1972 by Warner Bros. Records. It was the band's first album with bassist Tiran Porter and also the first with drummer Michael Hossack to augment existing drummer John Hartman, putting in place their trademark twin-drummer sound. Toulouse Street is the name of a street in New Orleans. The cover and inside centerfold photos were taken at a former brothel on Toulouse Street. The album includes the singles "Listen to the Music" and "Jesus Is Just Alright".

The album peaked at number 21 on the Billboard Top LPs & Tape chart.

The song "Mamaloi" was written by guitarist and vocalist Patrick Simmons and featured Tom Johnston on lead vocals. The song is unlike the others on the album, with Toulouse Street being a rock record and this song being reggae. Allmusic critic Bruce Eder described "Mamaloi" as a "laid-back Caribbean idyll".

== Reception ==
Professional ratings
Review scores
Source	Rating
AllMusic	4/5 stars
Christgau's Record Guide	C
The Encyclopedia of Popular Music	3/5 stars
The Great Rock Discography	6/10
MusicHound Rock: The Essential Album Guide	3.5/5
Rolling Stone	(favorable)
The Rolling Stone Album Guide	3/5 stars

== Track listing ==
All songs written and sung by Tom Johnston unless otherwise noted.

Side one
No.	Title	Writer(s)	Vocals	Length
1.	"Listen to the Music"		Johnston, Patrick Simmons	4:44
2.	"Rockin' Down the Highway"			3:18
3.	"Mamaloi"	Simmons		2:28
4.	"Toulouse Street"	Simmons	Simmons	3:20
5.	"Cotton Mouth"	James Seals, Darrell Crofts		3:44

Side two
No.	Title	Writer(s)	Vocals	Length
6.	"Don't Start Me to Talkin'"	Sonny Boy Williamson II		2:41
7.	"Jesus Is Just Alright"	Arthur Reid Reynolds	Simmons, Johnston	4:33
8.	"White Sun"			2:28
9.	"Disciple"			6:42
10.	"Snake Man"			1:35

== Personnel ==
=== The Doobie Brothers ===
- Tom Johnston – guitars, lead vocals (1–3, 5–10), backing vocals
- Patrick Simmons – guitars, lead vocals (1, 4, 7), backing vocals, banjo (1), recorder (4)
- Tiran Porter – bass (1–3, 5–10), backing vocals
- John Hartman – drums, percussion
- Michael Hossack – drums, steel drums (1)

==== Additional musicians ====
- Dave Shogren – bass (4), acoustic guitar (4), backing vocals (8)
- Bill Payne – piano (2, 6), organ (5, 7)
- Jerry Jumonville – tenor saxophone (5, 6), horn arrangements (5, 6)
- Jon Robert Smith – tenor saxophone (5, 6)
- Joe Lane Davis – baritone saxophone (5, 6)
- Sherman Marshall Cyr – trumpet (5, 6)
- Ted Templeman – additional percussion

=== Technical ===
- Produced by Ted Templeman
- Engineered by Donn Landee
- Associate producers and engineers – Stephen Barncard and Marty Cohn (4, 8, 10)
- Production coordination – Benita Brazier
- Photography – Michael Maggid and Jill Maggid
- Art direction – Ed Thrasher
- Design – John Casado and Barbara Casado
- Management – Bruce Cohn

== Charts ==
Chart (1972–1973)	Peak position
Australia (Kent Music Report)	57
Canada (RPM)	24
New Zealand Albums (RMNZ)	30
US (Billboard 200)	21

== Certifications ==
Region	Certification	Certified units/sales
Australia (ARIA)	Gold	20,000^{^}
^{^} Shipments figures based on certification alone.
