= Takin' It to the Streets (The Doobie Brothers album) =

Studio album by The Doobie Brothers
- Released: March 19, 1976
- Recorded: 1975
- Studios: Warner Bros. Recording Studios, North Hollywood; Mixed at Sunset Sound, Hollywood
- Genres: Rock; soft rock; R&B
- Length: 38:23
- Label: Warner Bros.
- Producer: Ted Templeman

The Doobie Brothers chronology
Stampede (1975)	Takin' It to the Streets (1976)	Best of The Doobies (1976)

Singles from Takin' It to the Streets
- 1. "Takin' It to the Streets" b/w "For Someone Special" Released: March 17, 1976; 2. "Wheels of Fortune" b/w "Slat Key Soquel Rag" Released: August 4, 1976; 3. "It Keeps You Runnin'" b/w "Turn It Loose" Released: October 5, 1976

Professional ratings
Review scores
Source	Rating
AllMusic	4.5/5 stars
The Encyclopedia of Popular Music	4/5 stars
The Great Rock Discography	7/10
MusicHound Rock: The Essential Album Guide	4/5 stars
Rolling Stone	(favorable)
The Rolling Stone Album Guide	3/5 stars
The Village Voice	C+

Takin' It to the Streets is the sixth studio album by American rock band The Doobie Brothers. The album was released on March 19, 1976, by Warner Bros. Records. It was the first to feature Michael McDonald on lead vocals and keyboards.

== Background ==
By late 1974, touring was beginning to take its toll on the band, especially leader Tom Johnston. Things became worse during touring in support of Stampede, when he was diagnosed with stomach ulcers. His condition worsened and several shows were cancelled. With Johnston forced to reduce his involvement with the band, the other members considered breaking up but, while in Baton Rouge, Louisiana, member Jeff Baxter suggested calling up friend and fellow Steely Dan graduate Michael McDonald, who at the time was between gigs and living in a garage apartment.

McDonald was reluctant at first, feeling he was not what they wanted. According to him, "...they were looking for someone who could play Hammond B-3 organ and a lot of keyboards, and I was just a songwriter/piano hacker. But more than anything, I think they were looking for a singer to fill Tommy's shoes." He agreed to join them and met them at the Le Pavillon Hotel in New Orleans. They moved into a warehouse to rehearse for the next two days. Expecting to be dispensed with when touring was completed, McDonald was surprised when the band invited him to the studio to work on their next album.

== Recording ==
With Johnston on the sidelines, the band was unsure how to proceed; they doubted being able to make an album without him.

"I knew the record company was panicked about any change in the band," McDonald admitted. "They were leery about getting a new guy. I was thrilled to have had the gig, but I wasn't expecting all that much."

With encouragement from producer Ted Templeman, the band began poring over the songs they had available. They knew they needed more, so McDonald brought in his own demos. Templeman told them, according to Patrick Simmons, "You've got a real diamond in the rough here that you can make into something if you want to go ahead." They decided to record his songs knowing it would take them in a completely different direction.

While Johnston was absent for most of the sessions, he contributed one song – "Turn It Loose" – as well as back-up vocals and duet vocals with Simmons on "Wheels of Fortune." "I hadn't quit the band", he later stated. "I just wasn't physically able to do it. I needed to get off the road and get away from that whole scene for a while." "For Someone Special" was written and sung by bassist Tiran Porter in reference to Johnston's absence.

== Track listing ==
Side one
No.	Title	Writer(s)	Lead vocals	Length
1.	"Wheels of Fortune"	Patrick Simmons, Jeff Baxter, John Hartman	Simmons, Tom Johnston	4:54
2.	"Takin' It to the Streets"	Michael McDonald	McDonald	3:56
3.	"8th Avenue Shuffle"	Simmons	Simmons	4:39
4.	"Losin' End"	McDonald	McDonald	3:39

Side two
No.	Title	Writer(s)	Lead vocals	Length
5.	"Rio"	Simmons, Baxter	Simmons, McDonald	3:49
6.	"For Someone Special"	Tiran Porter	Porter	5:04
7.	"It Keeps You Runnin'"	McDonald	McDonald	4:20
8.	"Turn It Loose"	Johnston	Johnston	3:53
9.	"Carry Me Away"	Simmons, Baxter, McDonald	McDonald	4:09

== Personnel ==
=== The Doobie Brothers ===
- Tom Johnston – guitars, lead vocals (1, 8), backing vocals
- Patrick Simmons – guitars, lead vocals (1, 3, 5), backing vocals
- Jeff "Skunk" Baxter – guitars, acoustic guitar (6)
- Michael McDonald – piano, keyboards, clavinet, synthesizers, lead vocals (2, 4, 5, 7, 9), backing vocals
- Tiran Porter – bass, lead vocals (6), backing vocals
- John Hartman – drums, percussion
- Keith Knudsen – drums, percussion, backing vocals

==== Additional musicians ====
- The Memphis Horns
  - Wayne Jackson – trumpet (1–3, 5, 6, 9)
  - Andrew Love – tenor saxophone (1–3, 5, 6, 9)
  - James Mitchell – baritone saxophone (1–3, 5, 9)
  - Lewis Collins – tenor saxophone (1–3, 5, 9)
  - Jack Hale – trombone (1–3, 5, 9)
- Bobby LaKind – congas (2, 4, 5)
- Richie Hayward – drums (1)
- Novi Novog – viola (4)
- Jesse Butler – organ (2)
- Maria Muldaur – cameo vocal (5)
- Ted Templeman – additional percussion

=== Technical ===
- Produced by Ted Templeman
- Engineered by Donn Landee
- Production coordination – Beth Naranjo
- Photography – Dan Fong
- Art direction – Ed Thrasher
- Management – Bruce Cohn

== Charts ==
Chart (1976)	Peak position
Australian Albums (Kent Music Report)	7
Canadian Albums (RPM)	18
Dutch Albums (Album Top 100)	11
New Zealand Albums (RMNZ)	7
UK Albums (OCC)	42
US Billboard 200	8
