= Tiran Porter =

American musician (born 1948)

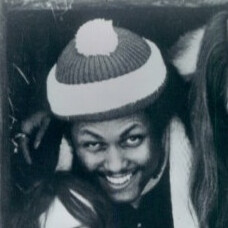
- Porter with The Doobie Brothers in 1974

Background information
- Born: Tiran Calvin Porter; September 26, 1948 (age 78); Los Angeles, California, United States
- Genre: Rock
- Occupation: Musician
- Instruments: Bass guitar; guitar; vocals
- Label: Warner Bros. Records

Tiran Calvin Porter (born September 26, 1948) is an American bassist, vocalist and composer, best known as a member of The Doobie Brothers from 1972 to 1980 and 1987 to 1992.

== Biography ==
=== Early life ===
Born in Los Angeles, California, Porter graduated from Leuzinger High School in Lawndale, California, in 1966. He was playing in LA in a garage band called Six Penny Opera when he got a call from a friend named Mike Mindell to play with Mindell and future Doobie Brother bandmate Patrick Simmons in a San Jose based trio called Scratch. Scratch disbanded when Simmons left the band to join the Doobies.

=== The Doobie Brothers ===
He rose to fame as a member of the Doobie Brothers, replacing bassist Dave Shogren on their second album Toulouse Street in 1972.

His vocals were mostly restricted to the background in the studio, although he wrote and sang "For Someone Special" (a tribute to ill bandleader Tom Johnston) on the album Takin' It To The Streets (1976) and the creatively syncopated "Need A Lady" on the album Livin' On The Fault Line (1977). In concert, Porter usually performed lead vocals on one or two songs.

Porter left the Doobies in 1980, citing frustration with the hectic and constant touring schedule. His replacement was session man Willie Weeks, later famous for his collaboration with Michael Jackson and other Quincy Jones protégés. After guesting onstage with his former bandmates briefly during the 1982 farewell tour, he rejoined the Doobies in 1987. Porter played on Cycles (1989), whose title was taken from an unused song he wrote, and Brotherhood (1991). Neither album featured a Porter composition or lead vocal, and his bass is often buried in the mix. After five years of touring in support of Cycles and Brotherhood, Porter finally quit the Doobies for good in 1992. He was reportedly still frustrated with constant touring and the band's preference for recording familiar-sounding material instead of his own, more diverse compositions.

Porter released a self-produced solo album, Playing to an Empty House, in 1995. It is a mix of rock, progressive, and jazz spotlighting Porter on all of the instruments and vocals. The album features jazz solos and little or no bass guitar, focusing instead on lead guitar and sequenced keyboards.

More recently, Porter played bass with singer-songwriter Keith Greeninger from the Santa Cruz, California, Beatles tribute band White Album Ensemble, Stormin' Norman and the Cyclones, and Moby Grape during its occasional reunions.

In 2020, Porter was inducted into the Rock and Roll Hall of Fame as a member of The Doobie Brothers.

=== Playing technique ===
Porter's most notable contributions to the Doobie Brothers' sound were his busy and punchy bass lines; his distinctive tone permeates all of the band's classic compositions and hits.

His early technique, with rich chordal attack, was based mostly on his picking style, favoring the guitar pick over fingerstyle playing. The hit title track from Takin' It to the Streets, which prominently features Porter's thundering, picked notes, is a prime example of this technique. More recently, even performing the old repertoire with the Doobies, Porter has been playing new, custom-made instruments almost exclusively finger style.

=== Equipment ===
Often pictured with Alembic or Gibson basses during the seventies (usually with a Thunderbird or Ripper bass and earlier with an EB-0L), Porter played Fender instruments, most notably the Fender Jazz Bass, along with BC Rich Eagles and Mockingbirds (Minute by Minute video) and Rickenbackers.

== Albums ==
=== Solo ===
- Playing To An Empty House (1995)

=== With the Doobie Brothers ===
- Toulouse Street (1972) (US No. 21)
- The Captain and Me (1973) (US No. 7)
- What Were Once Vices Are Now Habits (1974) (US No. 4)
- Stampede (1975) (US No. 4)
- Takin' It to the Streets (1976) (US No. 8)
- Livin' on the Fault Line (1977) (US No. 10)
- Minute by Minute (1978) (US No. 1)
- One Step Closer (1980) (US No. 3)
- Cycles (1989) (US No. 17)
- Brotherhood (1991) (US No. 82)
- Live at the Greek Theatre 1982 [Live] (2011) (guest appearance on one song)
