= Best of The Doobies Volume II =

Compilation album by The Doobie Brothers
- Released: November 1981
- Genre: Rock
- Length: 36:50
- Label: Warner Bros.
- Producer: Ted Templeman

The Doobie Brothers chronology
One Step Closer (1980)	Best of The Doobies Volume II (1981)	Farewell Tour (1983)

Best of the Doobies, Vol. II is a compilation album by the Doobie Brothers released in November 1981. It features ten songs from the three albums the band released between 1977 and 1980. The album peaked at No. 39 on the Billboard Top LPs chart and was certified Gold by the RIAA.

== Track listing ==
Side one
No.	Title	Writer(s)	Original album	Length
1.	"Little Darling (I Need You)"	Holland-Dozier-Holland	Livin' on the Fault Line	3:27
2.	"Echoes of Love"	Patrick Simmons, Willie Mitchell, Earl Randle	Livin' on the Fault Line	2:58
3.	"You Belong to Me"	Michael McDonald, Carly Simon	Livin' on the Fault Line	3:05
4.	"One Step Closer"	Keith Knudsen, John McFee, Carlene Carter	One Step Closer	4:12
5.	"What a Fool Believes"	McDonald, Kenny Loggins	Minute by Minute	3:40

Side two
No.	Title	Writer(s)	Original album	Length
6.	"Dependin' on You"	Simmons, McDonald	Minute by Minute	3:44
7.	"Here to Love You"	McDonald	Minute by Minute	3:28
8.	"One by One"	McDonald, Bobby LaKind	One Step Closer	3:45
9.	"Real Love"	McDonald, Patrick Henderson	One Step Closer	4:19
10.	"Minute by Minute"	McDonald, Lester Abrams	Minute by Minute	3:28

== Personnel ==
=== The Doobie Brothers ===
- Jeff Baxter – guitars
- Cornelius Bumpus – lead (4) and backing vocals, saxophones, organ
- John Hartman – drums, percussion
- Keith Knudsen – backing vocals, drums, percussion
- Bobby LaKind – backing vocals, percussion
- Chet McCracken – drums, percussion, mallets
- Michael McDonald – lead (1, 3–5, 7–10) and backing vocals, keyboards, synthesizers
- John McFee – backing vocals, guitars
- Tiran Porter – backing vocals, bass guitar
- Patrick Simmons – lead (2, 6, 8) and backing vocals, guitars

=== Additional personnel ===
- Rosemary Butler – backing vocals (1, 3, 6–7)
- Ben Cauley – trumpet (6–7)
- Jimmie Haskell – string arrangement (9)
- Patrick Henderson – keyboards (8–9)
- Nicolette Larson – backing vocals (6, 9)
- Andrew Love – saxophone (6–7)
- David Paich – string and horn arrangements (1, 3)
- Bill Payne – synthesizers (5, 10)
- Ted Templeman – backing vocals (4), percussion, drums (5)

== Charts ==
Chart (1981–1982)	Peak position
Australia (Kent Music Report)	46
US Top LPs & Tape (Billboard)	39

== Certifications ==
Region	Certification	Certified units/sales
Australia (ARIA)	Gold	35,000^{^}
United States (RIAA)	Gold	500,000^{^}
^{^} Shipments figures based on certification alone.
