= The Very Best of The Doobie Brothers =

Greatest hits album by The Doobie Brothers
- Released: March 13, 2007
- Genre: Rock
- Length: 124:29
- Label: FMR; Warner Bros.

The Doobie Brothers chronology
Live at Wolf Trap (2004)	The Very Best of The Doobie Brothers (2007)	World Gone Crazy (2010)

The Very Best of The Doobie Brothers is a two-disc greatest hits album by The Doobie Brothers released on March 13, 2007.

== Reception ==
Stephen Thomas Erlewine from AllMusic gave the album 4.5/5 stars, writing:

...for the average listener, this may be just a little too generous at 33 tracks. That's a long running time, providing room for all the hits plus a bunch of album tracks that weren't necessarily on album rock radio, so this may be too much for listeners who just want the hits; they should stick to that 2001 Greatest Hits. But for fans who want a lot of the Doobies' best without investing in either the original albums or the box, this Very Best is welcome.

Professional ratings
Review scores
Source	Rating
AllMusic	4.5/5 stars

== Track listing ==
Disc 1
No.	Title	Writer(s)	Original album	Length
1.	"Listen to the Music" (Single version)	Tom Johnston	Toulouse Street, 1972	3:26
2.	"Jesus Is Just Alright" (Single version)	Arthur Reid Reynolds	Toulouse Street	3:51
3.	"Rockin' Down the Highway"	Johnston	Toulouse Street	3:21
4.	"Long Train Runnin'"	Johnston	The Captain and Me, 1973	3:28
5.	"China Grove"	Johnston	The Captain and Me	3:15
6.	"South City Midnight Lady"	Patrick Simmons	The Captain and Me	5:29
7.	"Another Park, Another Sunday"	Johnston	What Were Once Vices Are Now Habits, 1974	4:27
8.	"Eyes of Silver"	Johnston	What Were Once Vices Are Now Habits	2:59
9.	"Nobody" (Single version)	Johnston	The Doobie Brothers, 1971	3:29
10.	"Black Water"	Simmons	What Were Once Vices Are Now Habits	4:15
11.	"Take Me in Your Arms (Rock Me a Little While)"	Holland–Dozier–Holland	Stampede, 1975	3:39
12.	"Sweet Maxine" (Single version)	Johnston, Simmons	Stampede	3:44
13.	"I Cheat the Hangman"	Simmons	Stampede	6:35
14.	"Takin' It to the Streets"	Michael McDonald	Takin' It to the Streets, 1976	3:50
15.	"Wheels of Fortune" (Single version)	Simmons, Jeff Baxter, John Hartman	Takin' It to the Streets	3:50
16.	"It Keeps You Runnin'"	McDonald	Takin' It to the Streets	4:16

Disc 2
No.	Title	Writer(s)	Original album	Length
1.	"Little Darling (I Need You)"	Holland–Dozier–Holland	Livin' on the Fault Line, 1977	3:25
2.	"Echoes of Love"	Simmons, Willie Mitchell, Earl Randle	Livin' on the Fault Line	2:59
3.	"What a Fool Believes"	McDonald, Kenny Loggins	Minute by Minute, 1978	3:42
4.	"Minute by Minute"	McDonald, Lester Abrams	Minute by Minute	3:26
5.	"Dependin' on You" (Single version)	McDonald, Simmons	Minute by Minute	3:15
6.	"Real Love"	McDonald, Patrick Henderson	One Step Closer, 1980	4:18
7.	"One Step Closer"	Keith Knudsen, Carlene Carter, John McFee	One Step Closer	4:11
8.	"Wynken, Blynken, and Nod"	Eugene Field, Lucy Simon	In Harmony: A Sesame Street Record, 1980	3:20
9.	"Keep This Train A-Rollin'"	McDonald	One Step Closer	3:28
10.	"Here to Love You" (Single version)	McDonald	Minute by Minute	3:26
11.	"You Belong to Me" (Live) (Early fade-out)	McDonald, Carly Simon	Farewell Tour, 1983; originally from Livin' on the Fault Line	3:04
12.	"The Doctor"	Johnston, Charlie Midnight, Eddie Schwartz	Cycles, 1989	3:46
13.	"South of the Border"	Johnston	Cycles	4:20
14.	"Need a Little Taste of Love"	Marvin Isley, Ernie Isley, Ronald Isley, O'Kelly Isley, Rudolph Isley, Chris Jasper	Cycles	4:03
15.	"Dangerous"	Simmons	Brotherhood, 1991	5:03
16.	"Rollin' On"	Johnston	Brotherhood	4:14
17.	"Ordinary Man"	Bob Bangerter, Michael Ruff, Neida Bequette	Sibling Rivalry, 2000	3:59

== Certifications ==
Region	Certification	Certified units/sales
United Kingdom (BPI)	Silver	60,000^{‡}
^{‡} Sales+streaming figures based on certification alone.
