= Real Love (Doobie Brothers song) =

Single by Doobie Brothers

from the album One Step Closer
- B-side: "Thank You Love"
- Released: August 21, 1980
- Recorded: 1980
- Studio: Sunset Sound Recorders, Hollywood, California
- Genre: Pop, soft rock
- Length: 4:16
- Label: Warner Bros.
- Songwriters: Michael McDonald, Patrick Henderson
- Producer: Ted Templeman

Doobie Brothers singles chronology
"Dependin' on You" (1979)	"Real Love" (1980)	"One Step Closer" (1980)

"Real Love" is a hit song by The Doobie Brothers, the first of three singles from their 1980 LP, One Step Closer.

"Real Love" became the greatest hit from the album, reaching No. 5 on the U.S. Billboard Hot 100 during the fall of the year. It is the group's third highest-charting U.S. single after their two number-one hits, "Black Water" and "What a Fool Believes". The song reached No. 12 in Canada. It was also a Top 20 Adult Contemporary hit in both nations.

Record World said that its "blue-eyed soul and melodic keyboard finesse translate into another multi-format charttopper."

The song became the second of nine songs entitled "Real Love" charting on the U.S. Billboard Hot 100 between 1980 and 1996, with the final being the Beatles hit. It is also the second biggest hit with this title, behind Jody Watley's.

== Personnel ==
- Michael McDonald — keyboards, organ, synthesizers, vocals
- Patrick Simmons — guitar, background vocals
- John McFee — guitar, background vocals
- Cornelius Bumpus — tenor saxophone, background vocals
- Tiran Porter — bass guitar
- Keith Knudsen — drums, background vocals
- Chet McCracken – drums

=== Additional personnel ===
- Bobby LaKind — congas, bongos, background vocals
- Nicolette Larson – background vocals
- Patrick Henderson – keyboards
- Jimmie Haskell – string arrangements

== Charts ==
=== Weekly charts ===
Chart (1980–81)	Peak position
Australian (Kent Music Report)	53
Canada RPM Top Singles	12
Canada RPM Adult Contemporary	15
US Billboard Hot 100	5
US Adult Contemporary (Billboard)	10
US Cash Box Top 100	7

=== Year-end charts ===
Chart (1980)	Rank
Canada	84
US (Joel Whitburn's Pop Annual)	49
US Cash Box Top 100	54
