= Amy Holland (album) =

Studio album by Amy Holland
- Released: 1980
- Recorded: 1980
- Studio: Cherokee Studios (Hollywood, California); Warner Bros. Recording Studios (North Hollywood, California); Wizard Recording Studios (Los Angeles, California)
- Genre: Pop, country
- Label: Capitol
- Producer: Michael McDonald; Patrick Henderson

Amy Holland chronology
| Amy Holland (1980) | On Your Every Word (1983) |

Amy Holland is singer Amy Holland's self-titled debut album. The album was released on LP record in 1980, and was produced by Amy's future husband Michael McDonald. One of the songs on the album "How Do I Survive" (a song originally sung by The Paul Bliss Band) became a big hit and made it to the Top 30 chart. Amy Holland would often perform "How Do I Survive" live on music TV shows such as Music Fair (a Japanese music show) and Young Oh! Oh!. Those live performances of the song can be found on YouTube. Holland mostly recorded some song covers for this album, with one of them being Annette Hanshaw's 1928 jazz-standard Forgetting You. The success of the song How Do I Survive helped Amy earn a Grammy Nomination for Best New Artist in 1981, but she did not win the award. Some of the songs on the album were written by Michael McDonald, such as "Here In The Light" and "Show Me the Way Home". "How Do I Survive" was a hit peaking at #22 on the Billboard Hot 100. Three years later Amy would release another studio album called On Your Every Word.

== Track listing ==
Side A
| No. | Title | Writer(s) | Length |
|---|---|---|---|
| 1. | "How Do I Survive" | Paul Bliss | 4:00 |
| 2. | "Strengthen My Love" | Timothy H. Moore | 3:58 |
| 3. | "Here in the Light" | Michael McDonald, Patrick Henderson | 3:56 |
| 4. | "Stars" | Dan Fogelberg | 4:11 |
| 5. | "Don't Kid Yourself" | Amy Holland, Patrick Henderson | 3:48 |

Side B
| No. | Title | Writer(s) | Length |
|---|---|---|---|
| 1. | "I'm Wondering" | Stevie Wonder, Henry Cosby, Sylvia Moy | 3:01 |
| 2. | "Looking for Love" | Matthew Moore, Tom Kosta | 3:37 |
| 3. | "Holding on to You" | Bill Martin | 3:46 |
| 4. | "Show Me the Way Home" | Michael McDonald | 3:36 |
| 5. | "Forgetting You" | B.G DeSylva, Lew Brown, Ray Henderson | 2:33 |

== Personnel ==
Musicians

- Amy Holland – lead vocals, and backing vocals (1, 3–8)
- Patrick Henderson – acoustic piano (1, 2, 5–9) electric piano (3, 4, 10), rhythm arrangements
- Michael McDonald – electric piano (1, 2, 5–9), backing vocals (1, 3, 4, 6), acoustic piano (3, 10), clavinet (6), rhythm arrangements
- Bill Payne – synthesizers (3, 4)
- Brian Mann – accordion (10)
- Hadley Hockensmith – guitars (1–5, 8–10)
- Jim Petteway – guitars (6, 7)
- John McFee – acoustic guitar (7), steel guitar (7, 8)
- John Pierce – bass (1, 3, 4, 8), fretless bass (10)
- Don Boyette – bass (2, 9)
- Mike Porcaro – bass (5)
- Trey Thompson – bass (6, 7)
- Mike Baird – drums (1–5, 8–10)
- Michael Hossack – drums (6, 7)
- Lenny Castro – percussion (1, 3, 4, 6, 7)
- Chet McCracken – vibraphone (2, 4)
- Plas Johnson – saxophones (1, 5, 9)
- Tom Scott – saxophones (1, 5, 9), horn arrangements (1, 5, 9), Lyricon solo (4), sax solo (8)
- Cornelius Bumpus – sax solo (2)
- Dick Hyde – trombone (1, 5, 9)
- Gary Grant – trumpet (1, 5, 9)
- Ollie Mitchell – trumpet (1, 5, 9)
- Norton Buffalo – harmonica (5, 6)
- Nick DeCaro – strings (3–5, 10), string arrangements (3–5, 10)
- Wendy Waldman – backing vocals (1)
- Charity McCrary – backing vocals (2)
- Linda McCrary – backing vocals (2)
- Bill Martin – backing vocals (3, 7, 8)
- Maureen MacDonald – backing vocals (3)

Production

- Patrick Henderson – producer
- Michael McDonald – producer
- Rob Schaper – engineer (1, 4, 5)
- Jeremy Smith – engineer (2, 3, 8–10)
- Don Landee – engineer (6, 7)
- Al Schmitt – mixing, mastering
- Don Henderson – mix assistant
- Mike Reese – mastering assistant
- The Mastering Lab (Hollywood, California) – mastering location
- Roy Kohara – art direction
- Henry Marquez – art direction
- Joe Heiner – cover illustration
- Norman Seeff – cover phototography
- John Woolley – inside photography
- Paul Cheslaw – management
- Karen Handman – managing assistant
