= Farewell Tour (album) =

Live album by The Doobie Brothers
- Released: June 1983
- Recorded: September 3, 1982; September 4, 1982; September 10–11, 1982
- Venues: Irvine Meadows Amphitheatre, Laguna Hills, CA; Universal Amphitheatre, Los Angeles, CA; Hearst Greek Theatre, Berkeley, CA
- Genre: Rock
- Length: 67:06
- Label: Warner Bros.
- Producer: Ted Templeman

The Doobie Brothers chronology
Best of The Doobies Volume II (1981)	Farewell Tour (1983)	Cycles (1989)

Singles from Farewell Tour
- 1. "You Belong to Me (live)" / "South City Midnight Lady (live)" Released: July 6, 1983

Professional ratings
Review scores
Source	Rating
AllMusic	2.5/5 stars
The Encyclopedia of Popular Music	3/5 stars
The Great Rock Discography	4/10
The Rolling Stone Album Guide	2/5 stars

Farewell Tour is the first live album by American rock band The Doobie Brothers, released in 1983. It documents the group's 1982 Farewell Tour and is a double album set.

By the early 1980s, the Doobie Brothers had evolved from the guitar-boogie sound under original band frontman Tom Johnston to a soulful keyboard-driven AOR sound under Michael McDonald. Despite the many personnel changes in the group, Patrick Simmons remained from the original incarnation of the group.

In 1982, Simmons decided to retire from the group after years of constant touring and recording. When the band decided to break up in light of his impending departure, Simmons encouraged the group to make one last tour during the summer of 1982 as a way of thanking the group's loyal fanbase. This tour became known as the "Farewell Tour."

The front cover shows drummer Keith Knudsen cutting the strings on John McFee's guitar as a symbolic gesture. The last two songs on the album were recorded at the final concert of the tour in Berkeley, California, on September 11, 1982, with vocals by original lead vocalist and guitarist Tom Johnston. For a long time the album was available on CD only in Japan, but ultimately it was re-released on CD by Rhino/WEA on August 26, 2008. The reissue deleted approximately 1½ minutes of onstage talk from Patrick Simmons between 'Jesus' and 'Minute by Minute', including mentioning that the band were going to "light up a 'doobie'" during intermission, suggesting the audience do the same.

== Track listing ==
Side one
No.	Title	Writer(s)	Lead vocals	Length
1.	"Slippery St. Paul (excerpt from The Doobie Brothers, 1971)"	Patrick Simmons	Tom Johnston	0:51
2.	"Takin' It to the Streets"	Michael McDonald	McDonald	4:26
3.	"Jesus Is Just Alright"	Arthur Reid Reynolds	Cornelius Bumpus	4:20
4.	"Minute by Minute"	McDonald, Lester Abrams	McDonald	4:25
5.	"Can't Let It Get Away"	Simmons, John McFee, Nicolette Larson	Simmons	3:46

Side two
No.	Title	Writer(s)	Lead vocals	Length
6.	"Listen to the Music"	Johnston	McDonald, Simmons	3:25
7.	"Echoes of Love"	Simmons, Willie Mitchell, Earl Randle	Simmons	2:35
8.	"What a Fool Believes"	McDonald, Kenny Loggins	McDonald	3:43
9.	"Black Water"	Simmons	Simmons	4:04

Side three
No.	Title	Writer(s)	Lead vocals	Length
10.	"You Belong to Me"	McDonald, Carly Simon	McDonald	3:16
11.	"Slack Key Soquel Rag"	Simmons	instrumental	1:51
12.	"Steamer Lane Breakdown"	Simmons	instrumental	3:34
13.	"South City Midnight Lady"	Simmons	Simmons	5:43

Side four
No.	Title	Writer(s)	Lead vocals	Length
14.	"Olana"	McDonald	McDonald	2:42
15.	"Don't Start Me Talkin'"	Sonny Boy Williamson	Keith Knudsen	2:37
16.	"Long Train Runnin'"	Johnston	Johnston	4:54
17.	"China Grove"	Johnston	Johnston	3:14

- "Can't Let It Get Away" and "Olana" are songs that the band had recorded in the studio but not released on albums. The studio version of "Can't Let It Get Away" was released only in Japan in 1981, while the studio version of "Olana" remained unreleased until it appeared on Long Train Runnin': 1970-2000.

== Personnel ==
- Patrick Simmons – guitars, lead and backing vocals
- Michael McDonald – keyboards, synthesizers, lead and backing vocals
- John McFee – guitars, pedal steel (12, 13), violin (9), backing vocals
- Keith Knudsen – drums, tambourine (9), backing vocals, lead vocals (15)
- Chet McCracken – drums, vibraphone and marimba (10, 13)
- Willie Weeks – bass, backing vocals
- Cornelius Bumpus – tenor saxophone, soprano saxophone (9), organ, synthesizers, backing vocals, lead vocals (3)
- Bobby LaKind – congas, percussion, backing vocals

Guests

- Tom Johnston – electric guitar and lead vocals (16, 17)
- Joe Crowley – harmonica (15)

=== Technical ===
- Produced by Ted Templeman
- Engineered by Jim Isaacson
- Management – Bruce Cohn
- Mastered by Bobby Hata at Warner Bros. Recording Studios, North Hollywood
- Production coordinator – Joan Parker
- Publicity – David Gest & Associates
- Album recorded by The Record Plant
- Record Plant technicians – Jack Crymes, Mark Eschelman, Gary Singleman, Jim Scott
- Tour manager – Joe Crowley
- Assistant tour manager – Jeff Mills
- Production manager – Lol Halsey
- Assistant production manager – Rollie Clasen
- Live sound mixer – David Morgan
- Monitor mixer – Mike Kelley
- Stage manager – Mark Brown
- Technicians – Mark Brown (guitars), David Bowers (guitars, violin, pedal steel), Alan Bartz (keyboards), Greg Winter (drums)
- Live sound technicians (Innovative Audio) – Mark Drale, Alan Bonomo, Philip Ashley
- Lighting director – Martin Wolff
- Art direction and design – Jay Vigon
- Photography – Chris Callis
- Photography assistant – Michael Simpson

== Charts ==
Chart (1983)	Peak position
Canada Albums (RPM)	87
US Top LPs & Tape (Billboard)	79
