= Minute by Minute (disambiguation) =

Minute by Minute is a 1978 album by The Doobie Brothers.

Minute by Minute may also refer to:

- "Minute by Minute" (The Doobie Brothers song), the title song from the album
- "Minute by Minute" (Grinspoon song), a 2007 song
- Minutt for minutt ("Minute by Minute"), a Norwegian series of "slow television" programs broadcast by NRK starting in 2009
