= Walking on a Wire (disambiguation) =

Walking on a Wire is a 2009 compilation album by Richard Thompson.

Walking on a Wire may also refer to:

- Walking on a Wire, an album by Lowen & Navarro 1990
- Walking on a Wire, an album by Skipper Wise
- "Walking on a Wire", a song by Amy Holland from Light on My Path
- "Walking on a Wire", a song by The Get Up Kids from On a Wire
- "Walking on a Wire", a song by Lost Lander
