= On Your Every Word =

Studio album by Amy Holland
- Released: 1983
- Studio: Hollywood Sound Recorders (Hollywood, California); The Complex (Los Angeles, California)
- Genre: Pop; rock
- Label: Capitol
- Producer: Michael McDonald

Amy Holland chronology
Amy Holland (1980)	On Your Every Word (1983)	The Journey to Miracle River (2008)

On Your Every Word is the second studio album by American singer Amy Holland, released in 1983 by Capitol Records. This was her last studio album, before she spent the rest of the 1980s recording songs for film soundtracks such as Scarface, Teen Wolf, Night of the Comet, St. Elmo's Fire, K-9, and much more. In one of the songs on the album, she sings a duet with David Pack (ex-Ambrosia) on the song "I Still Run to You". There is a cover version of the Four Tops' song "Shake Me, Wake Me (When It's Over)" sung by Holland. Steve Lukather collaborates on the album and does a guitar solo during an instrumental break on the last song of the album, "Rollin' By". In addition to the album's release, 1983 was the year when Holland and Michael McDonald got married. Holland did not release another studio album until 2008, when she released The Journey to Miracle River.

"(I Hang) On Your Every Word" was later covered by McDonald on his second solo studio album No Lookin' Back (1985).

== Track listing ==
No.	Title	Writer(s)	Length
1.	"Anytime You Want Me"	Paul Bliss	3:23
2.	"(I Hang) On Your Every Word"	Michael McDonald, Amy Holland	3:48
3.	"I'll Never Give Up"	Amy Holland, Jeff Day	3:32
4.	"Shake Me, Wake Me (When It's Over)"	Ed Holland, Lamont Dozier, Brian Holland	3:05
5.	"Hurts a Little Bit"	Melissa Lundgren, Lauren Wood	3:43
6.	"You & I"	Richard Page, John Lang, Steve George	3:11
7.	"So Sentimental"	Robert Akers Terry, Michael McDonald	3:12
8.	"I Still Run to You (Duet with David Pack)"	David Pack, Michael McDonald	4:15
9.	"Rollin' By"	Michael McDonald, Ed Sanford	4:35

== Personnel ==
- Amy Holland – lead vocals
- Brian Mann – keyboards (1), synthesizers (2–7), acoustic piano (3, 5, 9), accordion (3), Fender Rhodes (7, 8)
- Michael McDonald – backing vocals (1–8), acoustic piano (2, 6–8), synthesizers (2, 4–6, 8, 9), Fender Rhodes (3, 5, 9)
- Patrick Henderson – Fender Rhodes (2, 6)
- James Newton Howard – synthesizers (3, 8), string arrangements (3, 8)
- Robben Ford – guitars (1, 7), guitar solo (7)
- John McFee – guitars (1–3, 6, 9)
- Steve Lukather – guitars (2–5, 7–9), guitar solo (9)
- Robert Akers Terry – guitar solo (4)
- Mark Leonard – bass guitar (1)
- Bob Glaub – bass guitar (2, 6)
- Louis Johnson – bass guitar (3)
- Nathan East – bass guitar (4, 5, 7, 8)
- Willie Weeks – bass guitar (9)
- Jeff Porcaro – drums (1, 3, 9)
- Chet McCracken – Simmons drums (1), vibraphone (8)
- Mike Baird – drums (2, 4–8)
- Paul Medeiros – handclaps (3)
- Tom Scott – saxophone solo (1), Lyricon (3), horn arrangements (7, 9), horns (7, 9)
- Vince Denham – saxophone solo (8)
- Pete Christlieb – horns (7, 9)
- Jim Horn – horns (7, 9)
- Ernie Watts – horns (7, 9)
- Larry Williams – horns (7, 9)
- Dick Hyde – horns (7, 9)
- Charles Loper – horns (7, 9)
- Bill Reichenbach Jr. – horns (7, 9)
- Chuck Findley – horns (7, 9)
- Jerry Hey – horns (7, 9)
- Maureen McDonald – backing vocals (1)
- Denny Henson – backing vocals (2)
- David Pack – backing vocals (2, 4, 8), lead vocals (8)
- Jeff Day – backing vocals (4)
- Kathy Walker – backing vocals (5, 9)
- Steve George – backing vocals (6)
- Richard Page – backing vocals (6)
- Ed Sanford – backing vocals (7)
- Patrick Simmons – backing vocals (7)

=== Production ===
- Michael McDonald – producer
- Tom Perry – engineering and mixing (1–3, 6, 9)
- Ross Pallone – engineering and mixing (4, 5, 7, 8)
- The Mastering Lab (Hollywood, California) – mastering location
- Susan McGonigle – production assistant
- Jim Shea – photography
- Jeff Adamoff – design
- Front Line Management – management
- Irving Azoff – direction
