= What You Got =

What You Got may refer to:

- "What You Got" (Abs song), 2002
- "What You Got" (Colby O'Donis song), 2008
- "What You Got" (Grinspoon song), 2007
- "What You Got" (John Lennon song), 1974
- "What You Got", a song by Reveille from Bleed the Sky, 2001

== See also ==
- What Cha Got, an album by Al Kapone, 1997
- "Whatchugot", a song by Caro Emerald from Emerald Island, 2017
