= The Journey to Miracle River =

Studio album by Amy Holland
- Released: September 15, 2008
- Recorded: 2000–2008
- Genre: Pop; country
- Label: Chonin
- Producer: Bernie Chiaravalle

Amy Holland chronology
On Your Every Word (1983)	The Journey to Miracle River (2008)	Light on My Path (2016)

The Journey to Miracle River is the third studio album by American singer Amy Holland. It was released on September 15, 2008.

Holland's first studio album in 25 years, it was released under the Chonin Records label, with Bernie Chiaravalle being the producer for the album. Holland and Chiaravalle have written some songs for the album, but the first track on the album is a cover of a Robben Ford song called "Don't Lose Your Faith in Me". Holland wrote most of the songs for this album.

== Track listing ==
No.	Title	Writer(s)	Length
1.	"Don't Lose Your Faith in Me"	Robben Ford	4:47
2.	"Backdown"	Amy Holland, Bernie Chiaravalle	3:18
3.	"Miracle River"	Amy Holland, John Goodwin, Bernie Chiaravalle	4:04
4.	"Hate Love a Little"	Amy Holland, Bernie Chiaravalle, Michael McDonald	4:52
5.	"A Few Short Hours"	Amy Holland, John Goodwin, Bernie Chiaravalle	4:42
6.	"Witness"	Amy Holland, Bernie Chiaravalle	4:29
7.	"You Move Me That Way"	Amy Holland, John Goodwin, Bernie Chiaravalle	4:05
8.	"Everybody Wants to Be Your Friend"	Amy Holland, Jon Vezner, Bernie Chiaravalle	3:42
9.	"Surrender"	Amy Holland, Jon Vezner, Bernie Chiaravalle	4:01
10.	"Nothin' Left to Believe In"	Bernie Chiaravalle, Charles Frichtel	5:10
11.	"My Little Rebel"	Amy Holland, John Goodwin, Bernie Chiaravalle	4:23
12.	"Honest Emotion"	Michael McDonald, John Goodwin, Charles Frichtel	4:53

== Personnel ==
- Amy Holland – vocals
- Bernie Chiaravalle – keyboards, guitars, slide guitar, mandolin, autoharp, bass, percussion, vocals
- Tim Akers – organ (2, 6)
- Michael McDonald – vocals (2, 4, 6), organ (3)
- John Deaderick – acoustic piano (11, 12), organ (11, 12)
- Jon Vezner – guitars (8), acoustic piano (9)
- Dylan Morrison – fretless bass (7)
- Shannon Forrest – drums, percussion (2, 4, 6, 8, 9)
- Tollak Ollestad – harmonica (9)
- Stuart Duncan – violin (1, 4)
- Jonathan Yudkin – cello (3, 12), viola (12), violin (12)
- Tim Lorsch – cello (7, 10), violin (7, 10)
- Vince Gill – vocals (8)
- Dylan McDonald – vocals (10)

=== Production ===
- Bernie Chiaravalle – producer, engineer
- Gary Cirimelli – recording, mixing
- Shannon Forrest – engineer, mixing
- Grady Walker – engineer
- Wailani Hipilito – design
- Scott Johnson – design
- Anne Goetze – photography
