= One Step Closer (The Doobie Brothers album) =

Studio album by the Doobie Brothers
- Released: September 17, 1980
- Recorded: 1980
- Studios: Sunset Sound Recorders, Hollywood; Warner Bros. Recording Studio, North Hollywood; United Sound Recorders, Detroit; A&R Recorders, New York
- Genres: Soft rock; R&B; jazz rock
- Length: 37:41
- Label: Warner Bros.
- Producer: Ted Templeman

The Doobie Brothers chronology
Minute by Minute (1978)	One Step Closer (1980)	Best of The Doobies Volume II (1981)

Singles from One Step Closer
- 1. "Real Love" / "Thank You Love" Released: August 21, 1980; 2. "One Step Closer" / "South Bay Strut" Released: November 5, 1980; 3. "Keep This Train A-Rollin'" / "Just in Time" Released: January 28, 1981

Professional ratings
Review scores
Source	Rating
AllMusic	2/5 stars
Robert Christgau	B−
The Encyclopedia of Popular Music	3/5 stars
The Great Rock Discography	4/10
Rolling Stone	(mixed)
The Rolling Stone Album Guide	2/5 stars

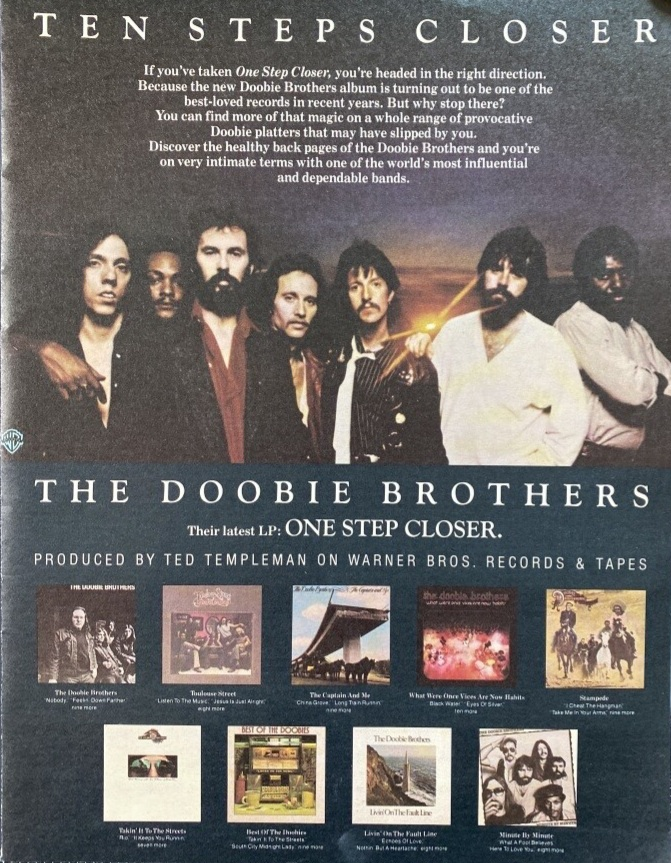
Trade ad for the album, 1981

One Step Closer is the ninth studio album by American rock band the Doobie Brothers. The album was released on September 17, 1980, by Warner Bros. Records. The album included the hit "Real Love", which reached No. 5 on the Billboard Hot 100. This album was the band's last studio album to be released before their initial 1982 breakup and last to feature Michael McDonald until 2014's Southbound. It is also their first studio album to feature John McFee as a member of the band although he would not feature on another until Sibling Rivalry in 2000.

== Track listing ==
Side one
No.	Title	Writer(s)	Vocals	Length
1.	"Dedicate This Heart"	Michael McDonald, Paul Anka	McDonald	4:07
2.	"Real Love"	McDonald, Patrick Henderson	McDonald	4:18
3.	"No Stoppin' Us Now"	Patrick Simmons, McDonald, Chris Thompson	Simmons	4:40
4.	"Thank You Love"	Cornelius Bumpus	Bumpus	6:22

Side two
No.	Title	Writer(s)	Vocals	Length
5.	"One Step Closer"	Keith Knudsen, Carlene Carter, John McFee	Bumpus, McDonald	4:10
6.	"Keep This Train A-Rollin"	McDonald	McDonald	3:29
7.	"Just in Time"	Simmons	Simmons	2:43
8.	"South Bay Strut"	Chet McCracken, McFee	instrumental	4:05
9.	"One by One"	Bobby LaKind, McDonald	Simmons, McDonald	3:47

== Personnel ==
=== The Doobie Brothers ===
- Michael McDonald – keyboards, synthesizers, lead vocals (1, 2, 5, 6, 9), backing vocals
- Patrick Simmons – guitars, lead vocals (3, 6, 9), backing vocals
- John McFee – guitars, backing vocals
- Cornelius Bumpus – tenor saxophone, soprano saxophone, organ, lead vocals (4, 5), backing vocals
- Tiran Porter – bass
- Keith Knudsen – drums, backing vocals
- Chet McCracken – drums, vibraphone, marimbas

==== Additional personnel ====
- Bobby LaKind – congas, bongos, backing vocals
- Nicolette Larson – backing vocals (1, 2, 7)
- Patrick Henderson – keyboards (2, 5, 6)
- Lee Thornburg – trumpet (6, 8), flugelhorn (1)
- Jimmie Haskell – string arrangements (2, 8)
- Chris Thompson – backing vocals (3)
- Jerome Jumonville – tenor saxophone, horn arrangements (6)
- Joel Peskin – baritone saxophone (6)
- Bill Armstrong – trumpet (6)
- Ted Templeman – tambourine, cowbell, maracas, backing vocals (5)

=== Production ===
- Produced by Ted Templeman
- Engineered by Jim Isaacson
- Second engineer – Gene Meros
- Mastered by Kent Duncan at Kendun Recorders (Burbank, CA)
- Art direction and design – Jim Welch
- Photography – Norman Seeff
- Production coordinator – Susyn Schope
- Production assistant – Joan Parker
- Publicity – David Gest
- Management – Bruce Cohn

== Charts ==
Chart (1980–81)	Peak position
Australian Albums (Kent Music Report)	18
Canadian Albums (RPM)	18
Dutch Albums (Album Top 100)	42
New Zealand Albums (RMNZ)	22
Norwegian Albums (VG-lista)	32
UK Albums (OCC)	53
US Billboard 200	3
