= Connie Price and the Keystones =

American cross-genre music project

- Origin: Los Angeles, California, U.S.
- Genres: Funk, hip-hop, soul
- Years active: 2004–present
- Labels: Now-Again Records, Ubiquity Records, A Man Called Horse Records
- Members: Dan Ubick
- Website: conniepriceandthekeystones.com

Connie Price and the Keystones is a project helmed by guitarist/multi-instrumentalist Dan Ubick from Los Angeles, California, combining influences of funk, hip-hop, psych and soul. Besides Ubick, it had a revolving membership while they performed as a backing band to Big Daddy Kane from 2008 to 2012. As a studio artist, Connie Price and the Keystones have released original recordings on three albums, two EPs and a number of singles.

== Career ==
In 2004, Connie Price put out an EP, Blood's Haul, on the Stones Throw imprint Now Again with UK drummer Malcom Catto, and that same year the instrumental album Wildflowers was released featuring members of Funk Inc., Poets Of Rhythm and L.A. Carnival. A second EP, Sticks & Stones, was released in 2005. It was a collection of live performances, a b-side, and a dub remix of the first cut from the LP. Three years later, Connie Price and the Keystones put out the Tell Me Something album on Ubiquity Records, which featured guest appearances from Percee P, Ohmega Watts, Wildchild, Soup/Zaakir from Jurassic 5, Aloe Blacc and Freestyle Fellowship's Myka Nyne among others.

From 2007 to 2009, Connie Price & the Keystones became one of two main backing bands on Scion's Live Metro series. In 2014, Connie Price and the Keystones digitally released four songs under the title "Lucas High EP", a tribute to Euro jazz-funk session man Doug Lucas, who helped create the sound for some rare studio instrumental bands and jazz-funk concept groups, including Chakachas, Superfunkydiscotheque, Plus, JJ Band, S.S.O. Orchestra, and Mombasa. The EP also featured Zach Lucas, son of the late jazz funk composer and trumpet player. Following the positive response to the EP, producers Dan Ubick and Matt Fife remastered the original four tracks with Dave Cooley and expanded the session to a full LP release called Lucas High with seven new originals (A Man Called Horse Records). Lucas High featured artists from the golden age of hip-hop, including Big Daddy Kane, Talib Kweli, Brand Nubian, M.O.P., Imani and Brown of The Pharcyde with DJ Rhettmatic, Soup and Marc 7 of Jurassic 5, Brother J of X-Clan, Wildchild of Lootpack, Llgl Tndr. This was along with a roster of female artists including Macy Gray, Rapsody, the Lady of Rage, Nini Monore and Jovi Rockwell. Mixed by Steve Kaye with Dan Ubick and recorded at The Lion's Den in Topanga, California, Lucas High has received critical praise from funk and hip-hop artists including Peanut Butter Wolf, DJ Numark, Colin Wolfe, Mazik, DJ Platurn, DJ Format, and rare music enthusiasts, including Gilles Peterson who named the record's opening track "Turn it Loose" as one of his "Best of 2019" favorite tracks list.

== Discography ==
=== Singles ===
- 2003 - "The Badger b/w "Sweet Soul Music" (Now Again NA7001-A)
- 2003 - "Highland Park b/w Time to Kill" (Now Again NA7008-A)
- 2003 - "Get Thy Bearings" (Donovan Cover) feat. Chris Manak (Now Again NA7006-A)
- 2014 - "Waterloo Sunset" feat. Gretchen Parlato (Digital Download)
- 2017 - "Four on the Floor" feat. Soup and Marc 7
- 2021 - "All Night" feat. Bootie Brown

=== Albums ===
- 2004 - Wildflowers (Now-Again Records)
- 2008 - Tell Me Something (Ubiquity Records)
- 2019 - Lucas High (Fat Beats/A Man Called Horse Records)

=== EPs ===
- 2006 - "Sticks & Stones" EP (NA5020)
- 2014 - "Lucas High" EP (Digital Download/Promo CD - A Man Called Horse Records)
