= How Do I Survive =

How Do I Survive may refer to:

- "How Do I Survive" (Amy Holland song)
- "How Do I Survive?" (Superfly song)
