= You Belong to Me (The Doobie Brothers song) =

1977 song by the Doobie Brothers

Song by the Doobie Brothers

from the album Livin' on the Fault Line
- Released: August 19, 1977
- Recorded: 1977
- Genre: Soft rock; R&B
- Length: 3:04
- Label: Warner Bros.
- Composer: Michael McDonald
- Lyricist: Carly Simon
- Producer: Ted Templeman

Audio
- "You Belong to Me" on YouTube

"You Belong to Me"

Single by Carly Simon

from the album Boys in the Trees
- B-side: "In a Small Moment"
- Released: April 1978 (U.S.)
- Recorded: 1978
- Genre: Jazz fusion; soft rock; blue-eyed soul
- Length: 3:52 (Album version); 3:12 (Single version)
- Label: Elektra
- Composer: Michael McDonald
- Lyricist: Carly Simon
- Producer: Arif Mardin

Carly Simon singles chronology
"Nobody Does It Better" (1977)	"You Belong to Me" (1978)	"Devoted to You" (1978)

Audio
- "You Belong to Me" on YouTube

"You Belong to Me (live)"

Single by the Doobie Brothers

from the album Farewell Tour
- B-side: "South City Midnight Lady" (live)
- Released: July 6, 1983
- Recorded: September 1982
- Genre: Soft rock
- Length: 3:16
- Label: Warner Bros.
- Composer: Michael McDonald
- Lyricist: Carly Simon
- Producer: Ted Templeman

The Doobie Brothers singles chronology
"Here to Love You" (1982)	"You Belong to Me (live)" (1983)	"The Doctor" (1989)

Audio
- "You Belong to Me" (live) on YouTube

"You Belong to Me" is a song written by American singer-songwriters Carly Simon and Michael McDonald. Simon wrote the lyrics, and McDonald composed the music. Originally recorded by McDonald's rock group The Doobie Brothers for their seventh studio album, Livin' on the Fault Line (1977), the song was made famous by Simon when she recorded it for her seventh studio album, Boys in the Trees (1978). The Doobie Brothers' recording has also been featured in various of the band's compilation albums, including Best of The Doobies Volume II (1981), Listen to the Music: The Very Best of The Doobie Brothers (1993), and Greatest Hits (2001). A live version of the song from The Doobie Brothers' 1983 album Farewell Tour would be released as a single and charted on the Pop Singles chart as a minor hit at No. 79 in August 1983. The Doobie Brothers later re-recorded the song with Amanda Sudano and Vince Gill on their 2014 album Southbound. McDonald also re-recorded the song with Spanish singer Concha Buika as a non-album single in 2022.

== Overview ==
Released as the lead single and opening track from Simon's seventh studio album, Boys in the Trees (1978), "You Belong to Me" reached the top 10 of the Billboard Pop Singles chart, peaking at No. 6, and remained on the chart for 18 weeks. It also peaked at No. 4 on the Billboard Adult Contemporary chart and stayed on the chart for 19 weeks. At the 21st Annual Grammy Awards in 1979, the track earned Simon a nomination for Best Female Pop Vocal Performance. Cash Box particularly praised the lead and backing vocals and "lilting sax solo." Record World said it "blends [Simon's] style with The Doobie Brothers' in a sultry, rather dream-like way, and some appropriate sax work adds to the effect."

One of Simon's biggest hits, "You Belong to Me”, has been featured on many compilations of her work, including the three-disc box set Clouds in My Coffee (1995), the UK import The Very Best of Carly Simon: Nobody Does It Better (1998), the two-disc retrospective Anthology (2002), and the single-disc Reflections: Carly Simon's Greatest Hits (2004). It is also featured in Simon's 1987 HBO concert special Live from Martha's Vineyard and the accompanying Greatest Hits Live (1988). The track is also featured in the romantic comedy films Desperately Seeking Susan (1985) and Little Black Book (2004).

In 2009, Simon re-recorded the song, with guest vocalist John Forté, for her album of acoustic performances of many of her past hits, Never Been Gone.

== Personnel ==
- Carly Simon – lead vocals, backing vocals
- Richard Tee – Fender Rhodes electric piano
- Cornell Dupree – electric guitar
- Eric Gale – electric guitar
- Gordon Edwards – bass
- Steve Gadd – drums
- David Sanborn – alto saxophone solo
- James Taylor – backing vocals
- Jonathan Abramowitz, Lamar Alsop, Julien Barber, Alfred Brown, Fredrick Buldrini, Paul Gershman, Ted Hoyle, Theodore Israel, Harold Kohon, Jesse Levy, Charles Libove, Guy Lumia, Joe Malin, Yoko Matsuo, Homer Mensch, Kermit Moore, Marvin Morgenstern, Alan Shulman, Mitsue Takayama and Gerald Tarack – strings

== Track listing ==
7" single

- "You Belong to Me" – 3:12
- "In A Small Moment" – 3:05

== Chart performance ==
Weekly chart (1978)	Peak position
Australia	43
Canada Top Singles (RPM)	5
Canada RPM Adult Contemporary	7
US Billboard Hot 100	6
US Billboard Adult Contemporary	4
US Cash Box Top 100	9
Quebec (ADISQ)	8

Year-end chart (1978)	Peak position
Canada	31
US Billboard Hot 100	59
US Cash Box	74

== Awards ==
Year	Award	Category	Work	Result	Ref.
1979	Grammy Awards	Best Pop Vocal Performance, Female (Simon)	"You Belong To Me"	Nominated	

== The Doobie Brothers version ==
"You Belong to Me" originally appeared on The Doobie Brothers' seventh studio album, Livin' on the Fault Line (1977). The live version from their 1983 album Farewell Tour would later chart on the Pop Singles chart at No. 79 in August 1983. An edit of the live version appears on the band's 2007 two-disc greatest hits album The Very Best of The Doobie Brothers.

=== Personnel ===
- Michael McDonald – vocals, keyboards
- Keith Knudsen – drums, backing vocals
- Maureen McDonald – backing vocals
- Rosemary Butler – backing vocals
- Tiran Porter – bass, backing vocals
- Bobby LaKind – congas, backing vocals
- John Hartman – drums
- Jeff Baxter – guitar
- Patrick Simmons – guitar, backing vocals
- Randy Brecker – trumpet solo
- David Paich – string arranger

=== Production ===
- Donn Landee – engineer
- Kent Nebergall – assistant engineer

=== Track listing ===
1983 live single

- "You Belong to Me" – 3:06
- "South City Midnight Lady" – 5:48

=== Chart performance ===
Weekly chart (1983)	Peak position
US Billboard Hot 100	79

== Anita Baker versions ==
"You Belong to Me"

Single by Anita Baker

from the album Rhythm of Love
- Released: 1995
- Recorded: 1994
- Genre: R&B; soul jazz
- Length: 4:41
- Label: Elektra
- Composer: Michael McDonald
- Lyricist: Carly Simon
- Producers: Michael J. Powell; Anita Baker (exec.)

Anita Baker singles chronology
"It's Been You" (1995)	"You Belong to Me" (1995)	"My Funny Valentine" (1995)

In 1994, American R&B/soul singer Anita Baker re-recorded her version of the song originally recorded for the compilation album Rubáiyát: Elektra's 40th Anniversary (produced by Lenny Kaye) in 1990. She re-released the track in 1995 as the fourth single from her fifth studio album, Rhythm of Love. The cover is not to be confused with another song recorded by Baker of the same name (co-written by Terry Britten, Billy Livsey and Graham Lyle), the closing track of her 1988 album Giving You the Best That I Got (also produced by Michael J. Powell).

== Jennifer Lopez version ==
In 2002, American singer Jennifer Lopez re-recorded her version of the song for her third studio album, This Is Me... Then (2002) as the ninth track on that album, was produced by Cory Rooney and Dan Shea, who produced the majority of the album. It had a more urban soul sound than Simon's recording, lasting three minutes and thirty seconds. Lopez's version contains an interpolation of "Catch the Beat," written by G. Andrews, K. Nix, Brad Osborne, and T. Ski Valley and performed by T. Ski Valley.
