= Dependin' on You =

- German single cover

Single by The Doobie Brothers

from the album Minute by Minute
- B-side: "How Do the Fools Survive"
- Released: July 25, 1979
- Recorded: 1978
- Studio: Warner Bros. Studios, North Hollywood, CA
- Genre: Pop rock, soft rock
- Length: 3:44
- Label: Warner Bros.
- Songwriters: Michael McDonald, Patrick Simmons
- Producer: Ted Templeman

The Doobie Brothers singles chronology
"Minute by Minute" (1979)	"Dependin' on You" (1979)	"Real Love" (1980)

"Dependin' on You" is a song co-written by Michael McDonald and Patrick Simmons, first released by the Doobie Brothers on their 1978 album Minute by Minute and subsequently released as the third single from the album and released on live and compilation albums.

== Background ==
"Dependin' on You" was co-written by Michael McDonald and Patrick Simmons. Simmons was the primary writer of the song. Unlike the previous singles from Minute by Minute, "What A Fool Believes" and "Minute by Minute", in which McDonald takes the entire lead vocal, Simmons takes the primary lead vocal on "Dependin' on You." Nicolette Larson and Rosemary Butler provide backing vocals.

== Reception ==
Cash Box said of the single "Dependin' on You" that it has "brass flourishes," "an infectious piano and bass boogie beat." Billboard praised the "arresting" hook and the use of the horns, saying that the song "is closer in spirit and tone to 'What A Fool Believes' than the jazz flavor of the album's title track." Record World said that it "features call & response vocals over a double time beat" giving it "instant, unlimited appeal."

Ultimate Classic Rock critic Michael Gallucci rated "Dependin' on You" to be the Doobie Brothers' all-time 9th greatest song. The staff of Billboard also rated the song as the Doobie Brothers' 9th greatest, rating it higher than the previous two singles from the album and saying that it is "a more genuine synthesis of Doobies old and new [than the prior two singles]" and that "Simmons’ gruff(er) vocal roughens up the track’s yacht rock polish, and McDonald’s insistent piano hook blends with [Jeff] Baxter's biting solos, straight out of Steely Dan’s Can’t Buy a Thrill playbook, to give the song a bit more muscle.

On the other hand, Rolling Stone critic Stephen Holden, who classified it as a Cubano number, considered the song to be "no better than second-rate lounge fare." Hartford Courant critic J. Greg Robertson called the song "soppy."

The single release reached #25 on the Billboard Hot 100, not quite as high as "What a Fool Believes," which reached #1, or "Minute by Minute," which reached #14. It also reached #37 on the Billboard Adult Contemporary chart. In Canada, it reached #33 on the Canada RPM Top 100 Singles chart.

In 1981 it was included on the Doobie Brothers' compilation album Best of The Doobies Volume II. It was later released on the 2001 compilation album Greatest Hits and on the 2007 compilation album The Very Best of the Doobie Brothers. It was also included on the 1999 box set Long Train Runnin' 1970-2000.

== Live performances ==
"Dependin' on You" has been in the Doobie Brothers' live concert repertoire into the 2020s. A live performance from 1996 benefit concert was released on the Doobie Brothers' live album Rockin' Down the Highway: The Wildlife Concert. Sun Herald critic Tim Islbell praised the way Danny Hull's saxophone playing interacts with Simmons' guitar playing on the track.
