= Light on My Path =

2016 studio album by Amy Holland

Studio album by Amy Holland
- Released: May 23, 2016
- Label: Chonin
- Producer: Fred Mollin

Amy Holland chronology
The Journey to Miracle River (2008)	Light on My Path (2016)

Light on My Path is Amy Holland's fourth studio album, released on May 23, 2016. It features chorus vocals by her husband Michael McDonald, and her son Dylan McDonald is also doing chorus here. She also sings a duet with her husband, "Prove That by Me". The album was produced by Fred Mollin.

== Track listing ==
No.	Title	Writer(s)	Length
1.	"Bridge of Sighs"	Louise Goffin, Reid Savage	3:49
2.	"I Must Have Left My Heart"	Marc Jordan, Steven MacKinnon	4:22
3.	"Walking on a Wire (Featuring Joseph Williams)"	Rick Boston, Eric Lowen, Dan Navarro	4:11
4.	"Stained Glass Love"	Marcus Hummon	3:12
5.	"Me, My Heart and I"	Joe H. Hunter, Grady Walker, Jim Whitehead	3:51
6.	"Gravity (Featuring David Crosby and David Pack)"	Jack Routh, Randy Sharp	4:22
7.	"We're All Strangers Here"	Michael McDonald, Danny O'Keefe	5:35
8.	"Impossible Love"	Bernie Chiaravalle, John Goodwin, Amy Holland-McDonald	4:27
9.	"Prove That by Me (Duet with Michael McDonald)"	Routh, Sharp	4:32
10.	"Holiday"	Richard Stekol	3:51
11.	"Hat Full of Stars"	Cyndi Lauper, Nicola Jane Lovell Holland	4:16
12.	"The Same Mistake"	Jordan, John Capek	5:03
13.	"Just Like Always"	Jimmy Webb	3:48
14.	"Light on My Path"	Chiaravalle, Goodwin, Holland-McDonald	2:34

== Personnel ==
- Amy Holland – vocals
- Pat Coil – pianos, synthesizers
- Fred Mollin – synthesizers, percussion
- Jeff Taylor – accordion
- Larry Beaird – acoustic guitars, mandolin
- Kerry Marx – electric guitars, acoustic guitars
- Bernie Chiaravalle – electric guitars, acoustic guitars
- Larry Paxton – bass, upright bass
- Greg Morrow – drums, percussion
- Stuart Duncan – fiddle, mandolin
- Jim Hoke – saxophones
- Steve Herrman – trumpet
- Matthew McCauley – string arrangements and conductor
- Jaime Babbitt – backing vocals
- Perry Coleman – backing vocals
- Troy Johnson – backing vocals
- Dylan McDonald – backing vocals
- Michael McDonald – backing vocals, lead vocals (9)
- Maureen Murphy – backing vocals
- Kevin Whalum – backing vocals
- Joseph Williams – backing vocals (3)
- David Crosby – backing vocals (6)
- David Pack – backing vocals (6)

=== Production ===
- Fred Mollin – producer
- Dave Salley – basic track recording, string recording, vocal recording, additional recording, mixing (3–6, 9, 11)
- Grady Walker – vocal recording
- Kyle Lehning – mixing (1, 2, 7, 8, 10, 12–14)
- Jarad Clement – additional recording
- Kevin Sokolnicki – additional recording
- Ethan Nichols – assistant engineer
- Greg Calbi – mastering
- Kathy Walker – production coordinator
- Heather Porcaro – art direction, design, photography
- Victoria Reid – design concept assistant

Studios

- Basic tracks recorded at The Sound Kitchen (Franklin, Tennessee).
- Vocals recorded at Bingham Band Studios (Leipers Fork, Tennessee).
- Strings recorded at Ronnie's Place (Nashville, Tennessee).
- Additional recordings at Zoomar South Studio (Nashville, Tennessee).
- Tracks #1, 2, 7, 8, 10 & 12-14 mixed at The Compound (Nashville, Tennessee); Tracks 3–6, 9 & 11 mixed at The Fort House (Nashville, Tennessee).
- Mastered at Sterling Sound (New York City, New York).
