= How Do I Survive (Amy Holland song) =

1980 single by Amy Holland

Single by Amy Holland

from the album Amy Holland
- B-side: "Don't Kid Yourself"
- Released: September 1980
- Recorded: 1980
- Genre: Pop rock
- Length: 3:59
- Label: Capitol
- Songwriter: Paul Bliss
- Producers: Michael McDonald, Patrick Henderson

"How Do I Survive"

Song by the Nolans

from the album Portrait
- Released: 19 March 1982
- Recorded: 1981
- Genre: Pop
- Length: 4:00
- Label: Epic
- Songwriter: Paul Bliss
- Producer: Nicky Graham

"How Do I Survive" is a song originally sung by the Paul Bliss Band and written by Paul Bliss.

In 1980, American pop singer Amy Holland recorded her own version for her debut album. Holland often performed this song live on TV programs, such as Music Fair and Young Oh! Oh!. This song is her only top 40 hit to date, peaking at number 22 on the US Billboard Hot 100 and number 34 on the Adult Contemporary chart. The release of Holland's debut album (and this song) helped her earn a Grammy Award nomination for Best New Artist in 1981.

In that same year, Dan Seals recorded this song and featured it on his album Stones. The song was later covered by The Nolans; their version of the song appears on their 1982 album Portrait.
