= Boys in the Trees =

Studio album by Carly Simon
- Released: April 1978
- Recorded: December 1977 – March 1978
- Studios: Atlantic and A & R, New York City
- Genres: Rock; pop; blue-eyed soul; disco
- Length: 35:46
- Label: Elektra
- Producer: Arif Mardin

Carly Simon chronology
| Another Passenger (1976) | Boys in the Trees (1978) | Spy (1979) |

Singles from Boys in the Trees
- 1. "You Belong to Me" Released: April 1978; 2. "Devoted to You" Released: August 1978; 3. "Tranquillo (Melt My Heart)" Released: November 1978

Boys in the Trees is the seventh studio album by American singer-songwriter Carly Simon, released by Elektra Records in April 1978.

The lead single, "You Belong to Me", reached No. 6 on the Billboard Pop Singles chart, becoming Simon's fifth Top 10 pop hit, and earned her a Grammy Award nomination for Best Pop Vocal Performance, Female. The second single, a remake of the Everly Brothers' 1958 hit "Devoted to You" (sung as a duet with then-husband James Taylor), also reached the Top 40, peaking at No. 36. The singles also hit the Top 10 on the Billboard Adult Contemporary chart, peaking at No. 4 and No. 2, respectively. The track "Tranquillo (Melt My Heart)" reached No. 86 on the US Cashbox Pop chart. Boys in the Trees became one of Simon's biggest selling albums, and was officially certified Platinum by the Recording Industry Association of America (RIAA) on August 7, 1978, for sales of over one million copies in the United States alone.

== Reception and packaging ==
Professional ratings
Review scores
| Source | Rating |
|---|---|
| AllMusic | 3/5 stars |
| Christgau's Record Guide | C+ |
| The Rolling Stone Album Guide | 3/5 stars |

Janet Maslin, writing in Rolling Stone, stated "Boys in the Trees is Carly Simon's most serene accomplishment to date, but its moods vary dramatically enough to indicate that peace of mind comes at a high price." When praising the single "You Belong to Me", Maslin went on to write, "It's a number that could easily have been belted out or growled à la "You're So Vain", but this time Simon prefers to sound more like a cat who's been dining on canary. Somehow, she's a lot more compelling using a gently chiding tone than she is striking a come-hither-or-else pose."

In a retrospective review for AllMusic, William Ruhlmann wrote that "what really made the album a winner was that Simon had had a couple of years to write some strong songs in her unflinching, reflective style, and she continued to explore the loves and mores of her age and class movingly." Cash Box said of the single "Tranquillo (Melt My Heart)" that a "funky arrangement of guitars, horns and strings follow a stepping beat" and praised Simon's "clean" vocal. "Boys in the Trees" is often played live by Tori Amos. "I used to listen to this song over and over, wishing I'd wrote it," Amos once said of the track.

The photo featured on the front cover of the album was expertly airbrushed to paint a Danskin top on what was a topless photo of Simon. The album won the Grammy Award for Best Album Package, which was awarded to Johnny Lee and Tony Lane.

== Awards ==
| Year | Award | Category | Work | Recipient(s) | Result | Ref. |
|---|---|---|---|---|---|---|
| 1979 | Grammy Awards | Best Pop Vocal Performance, Female | "You Belong to Me" | Carly Simon | Nominated | |
| 1979 | Grammy Awards | Best Album Package | Boys in the Trees | Johnny Lee and Tony Lane | Won | |

== Track listing ==
Credits adapted from the album's liner notes.

Side one
| No. | Title | Writer(s) | Length |
|---|---|---|---|
| 1. | "You Belong to Me" | Carly Simon; Michael McDonald | 3:52 |
| 2. | "Boys in the Trees" | Simon | 3:13 |
| 3. | "Back Down to Earth" | Simon | 3:08 |
| 4. | "Devoted to You" | Felice and Boudleaux Bryant | 2:29 |
| 5. | "De Bat (Fly in Me Face)" | Simon | 2:28 |
| 6. | "Haunting" | Simon | 2:28 |

Side two
| No. | Title | Writer(s) | Length |
|---|---|---|---|
| 1. | "Tranquillo (Melt My Heart)" | Simon; James Taylor; Arif Mardin | 4:02 |
| 2. | "You're the One" | Simon | 3:38 |
| 3. | "In a Small Moment" | Simon | 3:08 |
| 4. | "One Man Woman" | Taylor | 3:39 |
| 5. | "For Old Times Sake" | Simon; Jacob Brackman | 3:41 |
| Total length: | | | 35:46 |

== Personnel ==
=== Musicians ===
- Carly Simon – lead vocals, backing vocals (1, 7, 8, 11), acoustic guitar (2, 3, 11)
- Cornell Dupree – electric guitar (1, 8, 10)
- Eric Gale – electric guitar (1)
- Jeff Mironov – acoustic guitar (2), electric guitar (3)
- John Hall – electric guitar (3), backing vocals (5)
- Hugh McCracken – electric guitar solo (4)
- Hamish Stuart – guitar (7), backing vocals (7, 8)
- Onnie McIntyre – guitar (7)
- Stuart Scharf – electric guitar (9), acoustic guitar (11), autoharp (11)
- Gordon Edwards – bass (1, 8, 10)
- Will Lee – bass (3, 4)
- Tony Levin – bass (7, 8, 9)
- Richard Tee – Fender Rhodes, (1, 4), acoustic piano (3, 8, 10)
- Ken Bichel – acoustic piano (6), Fender Rhodes (9), ARP synthesizer (9)
- Don Grolnick – Fender Rhodes (7), ARP String Ensemble (7)
- Steve Gadd – drums (1–4, 6–10)
- David Carey – marimba (2)
- Rubens Bassini – percussion (5)
- Errol "Crusher" Bennett – bass drum (5), congas (5), percussion (10)
- David Sanborn – alto saxophone (1)
- Harvey Estrin – soprano and tenor recorders (2)
- George Marge – soprano and tenor recorders (2)
- Phil Bodner – oboe (6)
- Gloria Agostini – harp (6)
- Margaret Ross – harp (6)
- Joe Farrell – flute (9)
- Michael Brecker – tenor saxophone (10)
- Arif Mardin – horn and string arrangements, conductor, glass harmonica (11)
- Gene Orloff – concertmaster
- James Taylor – backing vocals (1, 2, 5, 7), acoustic guitar (2–5), vocal arrangement (5), horn arrangements (7)
- Harvey Estrin – alto saxophone
- George Young – alto saxophone
- Ronnie Cuber – baritone saxophone
- Jaroslav Jakubovič – baritone saxophone
- Eddie Bert – trombone
- Barry Rogers – trombone
- Randy Brecker – trumpet
- James Buffington – French horn
- Brooks Tillotson – French horn
- Roderick George – backing vocals (5)
- Luther Vandross – backing vocals (5)
- Ken Williams – backing vocals (5)
- Steven Dickson – backing vocals (6)
- Marc Embree – backing vocals (6)
- Alyia Orme – backing vocals (6)
- Joanna Simon – backing vocals (6)
- Lucy Simon – backing vocals (6)
- Cissy Houston – backing vocals (7)
- Alex Ligertwood – backing vocals (8)
- Jonathan Abramowitz, Lamar Alsop, Julien Barber, Alfred Brown, Fredrick Buldrini, Paul Gershman, Ted Hoyle, Theodore Israel, Harold Kohon, Jesse Levy, Charles Libove, Guy Lumia, Joe Malin, Yoko Matsuo, Homer Mensch, Kermit Moore, Marvin Morgenstern, Alan Shulman, Mitsue Takayama and Gerald Tarack – strings

=== Production ===
- Producer – Arif Mardin
- Recorded and Mixed by Lew Hahn
- Engineer – Bobby Warner
- Assistant Engineers – Ollie Cotton, Bill Dooley, Tom Heid and Mike O'Reilly.
- Mastered by George Piros at Atlantic Studios (New York, NY).
- Art Direction and Design – Tony Lane and Johnny Lee
- Photography – Deborah Turbeville

== Charts ==
| Chart (1978) | Peak position |
|---|---|
| Australian Albums (Kent Music Report) | 27 |
| Canada Top Albums/CDs (RPM) | 4 |
| US Billboard 200 | 10 |
| US Cash Box Top 200 Albums | 8 |

== Certifications ==
| Region | Certification | Certified units/sales |
|---|---|---|
| United States (RIAA) | Platinum | 1,000,000^{^} |
^{^} Shipments figures based on certification alone.
