= Tony Lane =

American graphic designer(1944-2016)

- Born: Anthony Samuel Lane; May 2, 1944; New York City, U.S.
- Died: January 1, 2016 (aged 71); Oakland, California, U.S.
- Education: High School of Art and Design, Philadelphia College of Art
- Known for: Photography and Graphic Design
- Children: Siiri Lane, Sebastian Lane

Anthony Samuel Lane (May 2, 1944 – January 1, 2016) was an American graphic artist best known for his album art for various musicians and bands. He began his career as an assistant to Alexey Brodovitch at Harper's Bazaar, and became an early art director for Rolling Stone magazine. He was the designer of iconic album covers for Simon & Garfunkel (Bridge over Troubled Water), Michael Jackson (Bad), and Creedence Clearwater Revival (Mardi Gras). His cover for Carly Simon's Boys in the Trees earned him a Grammy Award. He provided art direction for major record labels Columbia, Fantasy and Elektra, and developed branding for Pacific Telesis, LaCroix Sparkling Water, Wrangler and Kia. For two issues he was art director of Gnosis magazine.

Lane died of brain cancer on New Year's Day, 2016 in Oakland, California.
