= Minute by Minute (The Doobie Brothers song) =

Single by the Doobie Brothers

Single by the Doobie Brothers

from the album Minute by Minute
- B-side: "Sweet Feelin'"
- Released: April 25, 1979
- Recorded: 1978
- Studio: Warner Bros. Studios, North Hollywood, CA
- Genre: Pop rock; soft rock; R&B; pop-soul; yacht rock
- Length: 3:26
- Label: Warner Bros.
- Songwriters: Michael McDonald; Lester Abrams
- Producer: Ted Templeman

The Doobie Brothers singles chronology
"What a Fool Believes" (1979)	"Minute by Minute" (1979)	"Dependin' on You" (1979)

Music video
- "Minute by Minute" on YouTube

"Minute by Minute" is a song written by Michael McDonald and Lester Abrams and originally released by the Doobie Brothers on their 1978 album Minute by Minute. The single was released in April 1979, and reached number 14 on June 23 on the Billboard Hot 100 chart. It was nominated for a Grammy Award for Song of the Year, but lost out to the Doobie Brothers' own "What a Fool Believes". "Minute by Minute" did win a Grammy for Best Pop Vocal Performance by a Duo, Group or Chorus at the 22nd Annual Grammy Awards.

== Lyrics and music ==
AllMusic critic Matthew Greenwald describes "Minute by Minute" as one of the songs that reflects the Doobie Brothers' transformation to "a light, soul-oriented outfit." Keyboards are more prominent in the song than in some of the Doobie Brothers' earlier hits. Greenwald praises the "simple and literate" lyrics and notes possible influence from Booker T. & the M.G.'s in the music. In their book Inside the Hits, authors Wayne Wadhams, David Nathan, and Susan Lindsay describe the tempo as a "medium shuffle". AXS contributor Bill Craig describes the song as a soulful, mid-tempo, piano-driven song that he compares to Motown songs. Most of "Minute by Minute" is in the key of C major, but the bridge is in E minor and the last refrains are in G major.

== Reception ==
The New Rolling Stone Album Guide praises McDonald's "suave vocal mastery" on the song. Billboard described the vocal performance as "soulful." Billboard described the song as an "amalgam of rock and jazz styles with swaying rhythms and catchy melodies." Cash Box said that it utilizes the band's "identifiable bass -conga rhythm sound" and has a "nice organ-guitar fade-in." Record World called it a "solid group effort with strong blues flavor." Spin's Rich Stim describes the sound of the song as "phlegmatic". Ultimate Classic Rock critic Michael Gallucci rated "Minute by Minute" as the Doobie Brothers 7th greatest song, calling it "laid-back, blue-eyed soul at its best" and praising McDonald's vocal and organ performances.

"Minute by Minute" was nominated for a Grammy Award for Song of the Year but lost to the Doobie Brothers' prior single, "What a Fool Believes". Co-writer Michael McDonald was surprised by the song's success after a friend had told him that the song "just doesn't have it." Craig rated it as the Doobie Brothers' 6th greatest song.

== Chart performance ==
In the US, "Minute by Minute" was the follow-up single to their number 1 hit "What a Fool Believes". "Minute by Minute" did not repeat its predecessor's success, but reached the Top 20, peaking at number 14 on the Billboard Hot 100 chart. It also reached number 74 on Billboard's R&B singles chart as well as number 13 on the Adult Contemporary chart.

The song also had some chart success outside the US, reaching number 34 in New Zealand and 47 in the UK.

=== Chart history ===
The Doobie Brothers

Chart (1979)	Peak position
Canada Top Singles (RPM)	23
New Zealand	34
UK Singles (Official Charts Company)	47
US Billboard Hot 100	14
US Adult Contemporary (Billboard)	13
US Hot R&B/Hip-Hop Songs (Billboard)	74
US Cash Box Top 100	13

Peabo Bryson

Chart (1980)	Peak position
US Billboard R&B	12

== Personnel ==
- Michael McDonald – keyboards, synthesizers, lead vocals
- Tiran Porter – bass guitar, vocals
- Keith Knudsen – drums, vocals

Additional Personnel

- Bill Payne – synthesizer (with Michael McDonald)
- Bobby LaKind – congas

== Production ==
- Michael Zagaris - photography [inner sleeve]

== Other appearances ==
"Minute by Minute" has appeared on a number of Doobie Brothers' compilation albums since its initial release. It was included on Best of the Doobies, Vol. 2 in 1981, Greatest Hits in 2001 and The Very Best of the Doobie Brothers in 2007. It has also appeared on a number of live albums, including Farewell Tour in 1983, The Best of the Doobie Brothers Live in 1999 and Live at the Greek Theatre 1982 in 2011. On July 30, 1979, the Doobie Brothers performed "Minute by Minute" on the Dinah! show.

== Cover versions ==
- Helen Reddy covered the song on her 1979 album Reddy. Billboard picked Reddy's version as one of the best cuts on the album, calling it "a super single possibility."
- Peabo Bryson covered "Minute by Minute" on his 1980 LP Paradise and it reached No. 12 on the U.S. R&B chart. He also included it on his 2001 album Anthology.
- Larry Carlton's instrumental cover, released on his 1987 album Discovery, won Best Pop Instrumental Performance at the 30th Annual Grammy Awards.
- Stanley Clarke's cover, released on the 1993 album Live at the Greek, was described by JazzTimes as "straight pop joy".
