= Help (band) =

American rock band

- Origin: California, United States
- Genres: Psychedelic rock, acid rock, hard rock
- Years active: 1970-71
- Label: Decca
- Past members: Chet McCracken; Jack Merrill; Bob Rochan

Help were a 1970s psychedelic, acid, hard rock power trio from California.

The band comprised Jack Merrill (vocals, guitar, formerly of The Echos, Candy Johnson and the Exciters, Sumpin' Else, & Hot Chocolate), Bob Rochan (vocals, bass guitar, percussion, formerly of The Sentinels, Sumpin' Else, and Hot Chocolate), and Chet McCracken (vocals, drums, percussion, formerly of the Evergreen Blueshoes).

They released two albums on Decca Records in 1970 and 1971.

McCracken went on to drum with The Doobie Brothers.

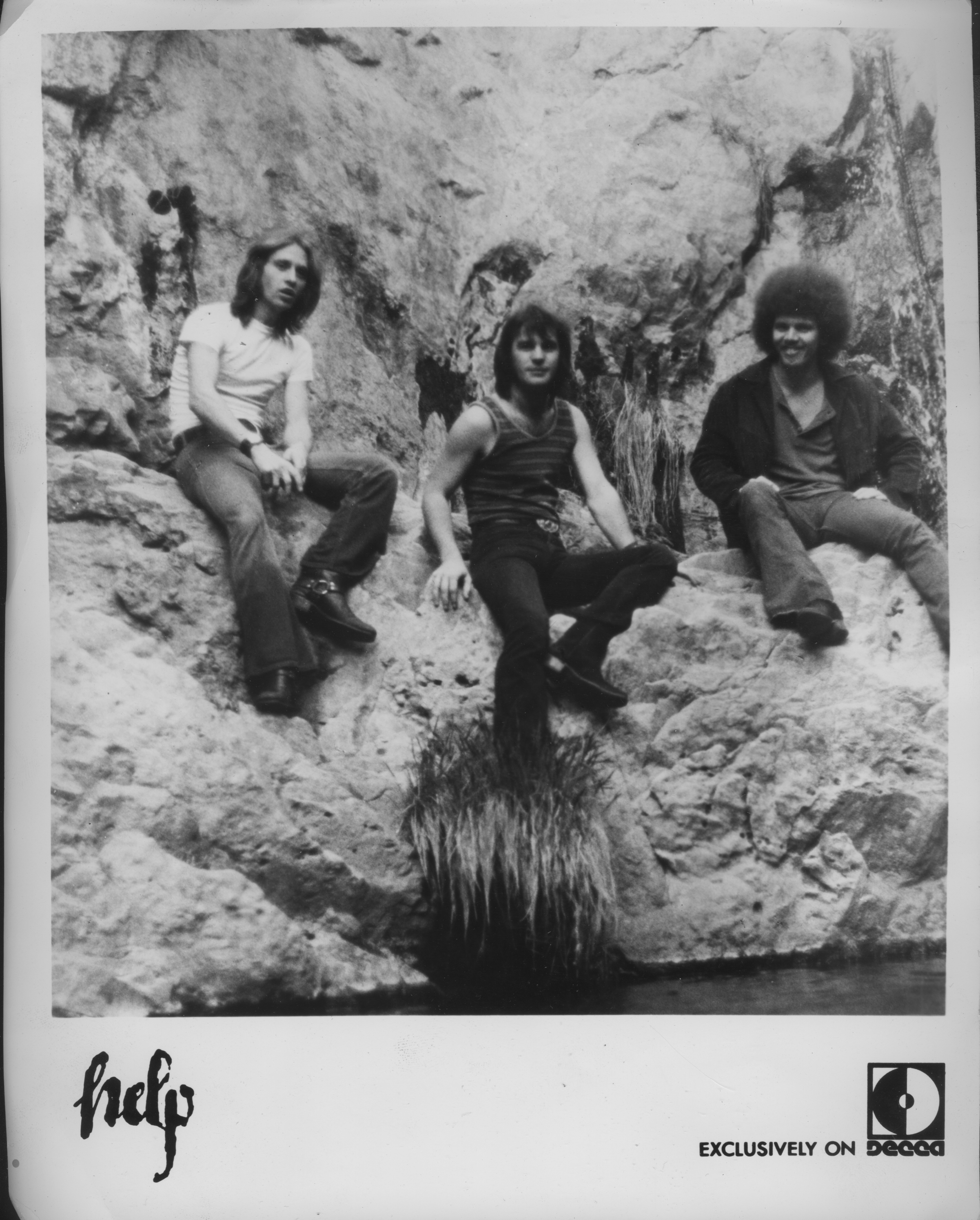
Help! in 1971. Left to right, Chet McCracken, Bob Rochan, Jack Merrill

== Discography ==
=== Albums ===
- Help (1970), Decca
- Second Coming (1971), Decca

=== Singles ===
- "Keep in Touch" (1971), Decca
- "Good Time Music" (1971), Decca
