= Lester Abrams =

- Born: 1945 (age 80–81)
- Genres: Funk, rock
- Occupation: Musician
- Instruments: Drums, vocals, organ, acoustic piano, percussion

Lester Abrams (born 1945) is a singer, songwriter, musician and producer who has played with such artists as B.B. King, Stevie Wonder, Peabo Bryson, Quincy Jones, Manfred Mann, Brian Auger, The Average White Band, The Doobie Brothers, Rufus and many others. Two of his co-compositions appeared on the Grammy Award–winning Doobie Brothers’ album Minute by Minute. He has also composed songs for film and television; two of his works can be heard in the Oliver Stone–produced movie South Central.

Lester Abrams was also a member of and/or associated with several other bands and people, including Leslie Smith, Arno Lucas, Rick Chudacoff, The Les Smith Soul Band, L.A. Carnival, Crackin' and more recently, Connie Price and the Keystones.

== Biography ==
Lester's maternal grandmother moved the Abrams family from the Southwest to Omaha in the early 1900s; Lester's multi-racial father met his bi-racial mother there. Lester was born in 1945, and, as a child, had serious problems explaining his cultural background, which included ancestry from both Native and Black America.

Lester's introduction to music was sitting next to his grandmother at her piano. However, although he "tinkered around" with the piano, his instrument of choice was the drums. His skill was such that his junior high bandleader, Harold Smith, allowed him to play with the high school dance band. By the time he started at the Omaha Technical High School in 1960, he had been playing in the dance band for nearly two years.

== Career ==
=== Early years ===
Abrams' first band was the El Doradoes, with Michael Hatfield on rhythm guitar, Louie Walker on lead guitar, Danny Williams on tenor sax and Greg Williams on baritone sax. Through his teen years he developed his own style of drumming, adding a funk rhythm to established riffs, and playing in clubs in Omaha's Near North Side.

In his early twenties, he took the lead of The Fabulous Impacts, with Joe Olivo on bass, Dave “Barney” Barnhart on guitar, Ed Finney on organ, Harry Roberts on trumpet and sax and ex–El Dorado Mike Hatfield on lead vocals. Funded by Olivo's father, and recorded at Sears Recording Studio by local label owner Eddie Haddad, the group crafted two 45s – the Abrams-composed “A Thousand Years” b/w “Cry Cry” (both featuring Lester on lead vocals) and Allen Toussaint's "Get Out of My Life, Woman" backed with “Tell Me”.

=== The Les Smith Soul Band ===
As Lester was developing the Fabulous Impacts and a reputation as "the baddest drummer in town", Leslie Orlando Smith (born 1949 in Detroit) was attending North High School and singing lead in the band Sights and Sounds with, amongst others, schoolmate Ron Cooley on guitar and a bass player from Central High, Rick Chudacoff. After a series of personnel and name changes, including the addition of Arno Lucas, they became the Les Smith Soul Band.

After some time, Leslie invited Lester to a performance at a local high school, and subsequently to sit in on a rehearsal. At the rehearsal, Lester joined in, and by the end of the sessions was part of the band. He immediately took over control of the band, and it went from being a soul band to being a funk band with the lineup:

- Lester Abrams – drums, vocals, organ, acoustic piano, percussion
- Arno Lucas – vocals, percussion
- Leslie Smith – vocals
- Rick Chudacoff – electric bass, backup vocals
- Ron Cooley – electric and acoustic guitar
- Geno DeVaughn – trumpet
- Percy Marion – tenor saxophone, flute
- Michael Patterson – alto saxophone

In 1969, the band cut three tracks, all written by Abrams: the soulful “Blind Man”, the Arno Lucas lead “Bad Luck”, and an instrumental funk number, “Blues for LA”.

=== L.A. Carnival ===
In 1969, Leslie Smith was drafted into the army and stationed in Seoul. Abrams changed the band's name to L.A. Carnival (L.A. as in Lester Abrams). Vocal duties were assumed mainly by Arno, with Abrams singing backup from behind the drum kit.

Under that name, they released only one single, "Blind Man" b/w "Color" on Skip Wilson's Pacific Avenue label. Abrams arranged for an appearance in California on Johnny Otis’ show, but Rick, Ron, and Percy had student deferments and couldn't leave Omaha. ("Had we left school in Omaha, we would have been drafted and sent to Vietnam.”)

By the time their single was released, the band members had other priorities. Leslie had returned from the army and signed on for HAIR’s nationwide tour, Rick and Arno were readying to join funk-rock outfit Crackin’, and Ron had joined a rock band called Pilot. As Rick Chudacoff recalls, "L.A. Carnival quietly faded away".

=== Crackin' ===
In the mid-70's, Lester became involved with Crackin', who released four LPs between 1975 and 1978. Lester played on the first three of these LPs.

- 1975 Crackin'-1 (Polydor PD6044)
- 1977 Makings of a Dream (Warner Bros. BS2989)
- 1977 Crackin' (Warner Bros. BS3123 )
- 1978 Special Touch (Warner Bros. wb3235)

Performers common to all four of the LPs were Rick Chudacoff (bass), Leslie Smith (vocals), Arno Lucas (vocals and percussion), Bob Bordy (guitars), and George T. Clinton (keyboards). Lester Abrams (vocals & keyboards) performed on the first three, Peter Bunetta (drums) performed on the last three, and Brian Ray (guitars) on the last two.

Rick Chudacoff and Peter Bunetta went on to produce many albums. Often, Rick, Peter, Leslie, Arno, and Bob also performed on the albums. Chudacoff has also been referred to as "Noted Nashville hitmaker Rick Chudacoff (The Temptations, Smokey Robinson, Alison Krauss)".

On 30 September 2006, a performance at the Casino de Paris (in Paris) involved many of these artists.

=== The Doobie Brothers ===
In the late '70s, Abrams moved to California and became involved with The Doobie Brothers' 1979 Grammy Award–winning Minute by Minute album. He arranged "What a Fool Believes", which won two 1979 Grammys for Record of the Year and Song of the Year. He is credited with piano and vocals on the album. He co-wrote the "Minute by Minute" single with McDonald, and "Open Your Eyes" with McDonald and Henderson.

=== 1980s ===
- 1982 Leslie Smith released his first album, Heartache (Elektra), produced by Peter Bunetta and Rick Chudacoff, which contains cover versions such as Airplay's "Nothin' You Can Do About It" and Ned Doheny's "Love's A Heartache".
- 1988 The song "Love Light", written, produced and arranged by Lester Abrams, appeared on the soundtrack to the 1988 movie The Party.

=== 1990s ===
- 1992 Leslie Smith releases Les Is More, Polydor (POCP-1271).
- 1992 Lester Abrams became involved with the film South Central.

=== 2000s – Resurgence of L.A. Carnival ===
- In 2002, four of the members of L.A. Carnival reunited in Malibu Canyon, resulting in the complete set of L.A. Carnival / Les Smith Soul Band songs being re-released by Now-Again Records in 2003. As part of that process, "Egon" (and friends) from Now-Again Records produced a 6-minute "feature film" on YouTube which includes an interview with Lester, and two partial renditions of "Flyin'", one of which also includes Les Smith.
- Also in 2003, Abrams composed "Bring It On" as a charity single in support of the Juvenile Diabetes Research Foundation.
- "On 30 May 2004, Abrams and Smith joined forces with young funkateers Connie Price and the Keystones to bring the L.A. Carnival sound back to life, with a live performance at the Independent in San Francisco".
- Abrams and Smith appear on Connie Price and the Keystones' 2004 album Wildflowers.
- In 2005, Lester, along with Arno Lucas and Leslie Smith (ex–L.A. Carnival and Crackin' members), were inducted into the Omaha Black Music Hall of Fame.

== Compositions ==
- 1967 "A Thousand Years" - performed by The Fabulous Impacts
- 1969-71: A dozen songs performed by L.A. Carnival and/or The Les Smith Soul Band: "Bad Luck", “Black Man’s March”, "Blind Man", "Blues for LA", "Can You Hum a Tune", "Color", “Flying”, “Pose A Question”, "Scratchin'", “Seven Lonely Steps” (also titled "7 Steps to Nowhere"), “The Klan” and “We Need Peace” (also titled "We Need Peace and Love")
- 1975-77: Over a dozen songs appearing on various Crackin' LPs, including "Wanna Dance", "Fall in Line", "Starring You", "Turn It Over", "The Force is Watching You" (with Michael Omartian and Leslie Orlando Smith), "Fallen Dancer", "I Know You Can" (with Rick Chudacoff and L. Lovingood), "Do You Need More Time" (with Arno Lucas and Leslie Orlando Smith), and "The World's A Fool for You".
- 1979 "Minute by Minute" (with Michael McDonald)
  - Performed by The Doobie Brothers: Appears on several Doobie Brothers albums, and on many compilation albums.
  - Others who have recorded a performance of "Minute by Minute" include Stanley Clarke, Larry Carlton, Bobby Lyle, Kim Pensyl and Peabo Bryson.
  - Larry Carlton won a Grammy in 1987 for his version of the song.
- 1979 "Open Your Eyes" (with McDonald and Henderson) - performed by The Doobie Brothers, and also by Maria Muldaur
- 1986 "You Want It Your Way, Always" (with Sandee Burnett) - performed by Fizzy Qwick
- 1988 "Love Light"
- 2003 "Bring It On"

== Discography ==
=== 1967 The Fabulous Impacts ===
Two 45s

- “A Thousand Years” b/w “Cry Cry”
- "Get Out of My Life, Woman" backed with “Tell Me”

=== 1969 The Les Smith Soul Band ===
The band cut three tracks

- “Blind Man”
- “Bad Luck”
- “Blues for LA”

=== 1971 L.A. Carnival ===
One single: "Blind Man" b/w "Color" on Skip Wilson's Pacific Avenue label.

=== 1975–1978 Crackin' ===
==== Crackin'–1 ====
- Format: LP
- Released: 1975
- Label: Polydor
- Catalog No: PD 6044
- Playing Time: 33:21
- Track list
- A1. "Wanna Dance" (3:41) (Lester Abrams)
- A2. "Nothin' to Fear" (4:30) (Rick Chudacoff, Leslie Orlando Smith)
- A3. "Fall in Line" (4:23) (Lester Abrams)
- A4. "Starring You" (2:50) (Lester Abrams)
- A5. "Turn It Over" (0:53) (Lester Abrams)
- B1. "Right as Rain" (3:24) (David S. Andersen)
- B2. "What Ta Day" (4:41) (Rick Chudacoff)
- B3. "Live Life Simple" (3:58) (Leslie Orlando Smith, Rick Chudacoff, Arno Lucas)
- B4. "Jump Up" (3:24) (David S. Andersen)
- B5. "Get Crackin'" (1:37) (Lester Abrams, Bob Bordy, Rick Chudacoff, George Clinton, Lou Gordon, Arno Lucas, Leslie Orlando Smith)

==== Makings of a Dream ====
- Format: LP
- Released: 1977
- Label: Warner Bros.
- Catalog No: BS2989

==== Crackin' ====
- Format: LP
- Released: 1977
- Label: Warner Brothers
- Catalog No: BS 3123
- Playing Time: 35:23
- Track list
- A1. "It Just Takes Awhile" (3:29) (Rick Chudacoff, Arno Lucas)
- A2. "The Force is Watching You" (4:32) (Lester Abrams, Michael Omartian, Leslie Orlando Smith)
- A3. "Fallen Dancer" (3:55) (Lester Abrams)
- A4. "I Know You Can" (3:00) (Rick Chudacoff, Lester Abrams, L. Lovingood)
- A5. "Do You Need More Time" (3:37) (Arno Lucas, Lester Abrams, Leslie Orlando Smith)
- B1. "Don't You Wish You Could Be There" (4:46) (Rick Chudacoff, Arno Lucas, Leslie Orlando Smith)
- B2. "You Know Where I Am" (3:50) (Arno Lucas, Michael Omartian, Leslie Orlando Smith)
- B3. "The World's a Fool for You" (4:24) (Lester Abrams)
- B4. "You'll Feel Better" (3:50) (Rick Chudacoff, Arno Lucas, Peter Bunetta)

==== Special Touch ====
- Format: LP
- Released: 1978
- Label: Warner Brothers
- Catalog No: BS 3235
- Track list
- A1. "Double Love" (3:25) (Michael Omartian, Arno Lucas, Bob Bordy)
- A2. "Too Young" (3:59) (Rick Chudacoff, Arno Lucas, Bob Bordy, Michael Omartian)
- A3. "Heavenly Day" (4:05) (Arno Lucas, Rick Chudacoff, Michael Omartian, Bob Bordy)
- A4. "Nobody Else" (3:05) (Robert Dupis)
- A5. "I Could Be Anything" (3:55) (G.T. Clinton, Peter Bunetta)
- B1. "I Can't Wait Forever" (4:02) (Rick Chudacoff, Peter Bunetta, Arno Lucas, Bob Bordy)
- B2. "In Between" (3:54) (Michael Omartian, Stormie Omartian)
- B3. "Don't Cha Love Me" (3:48) (L.O. Smith, Arno Lucas, Ray White, John Carter)
- B4. "On The Wing" (4:15) (L.O. Smith, Ray White, John Carter)
- B5. "Kalalee" (5:09) (Rick Chudacoff, Arno Lucas)

=== 2003 L.A. Carnival / Les Smith Soul Band re-releases ===
In 2003, the complete set of L.A. Carnival / Les Smith Soul Band songs, all written by Abrams, were re-released by Now-Again Records.

==== "Color" b/w "Blind Man" ====
- NA7003 / STH7024 – 7" single – 2003 – produced by Scott Abrams
- Track list
  1. Color
  2. Blind Man

==== "Blind Man" ====
- NA2003 / STH2053 – 12" single – 2003 – produced by Lester Abrams
- Track list
- A1. Blind Man (vocal)
- A2. Blind Man (instrumental)
- A3. Blind Man (acapella)
- B1. Blind Man (Cut Chemist remix)
- B2. Blind Man (original version)

==== "Pose a Question" b/w "Can You Hum a Tune" ====
- NA7011 – 7" single – 2003 – produced by Lester Abrams
- Track list
  1. Pose a Question
  2. Can You Hum a Tune?

==== "Would Like to Pose a Question" ====
- NA5009 – 2LP/CD – 2003 – produced by Lester Abrams
- Track list
- A1. Flyin'
- A2. We Need Peace and Love
- B1. (We'd Like To) Pose a Question
- B2. Seven Steps to Nowhere
- B3. Blind Man
- C1. Can You Hum a Tune?
- C2. Color
- C3. The Klan
- D1. Black Man's March
- D2. Ron's Tune
- CD track list
  1. Flyin' 4:48
  2. We Need Peace and Love 4:03
  3. (We'd Like To) Pose a Question 3:22
  4. 7 Steps to Nowhere 4:57
  5. Blind Man 2:59
  6. Can You Hum a Tune 2:00
  7. Color 2:30
  8. The Klan 7:42
  9. Black Man's March 3:14
  10. Ron's Tune 4:34
  11. Scratchin' [Live] 5:41
  12. Ron's Tune [Alternate Take – live] 6:34
  13. Bad Luck [Live] 3:06
  14. Blues for L.A. [Live] 2:49

== Filmography credits ==
- 1988 The Party – Song ("Love Light")
- 1992 South Central – Songs
- 1992 South Central – Song Performer ("Love Light", "Drink the Water")
- 2005 The 40-Year-Old Virgin - Song ("Minute by Minute")
