= Amy Holland =

American singer (born 1953)

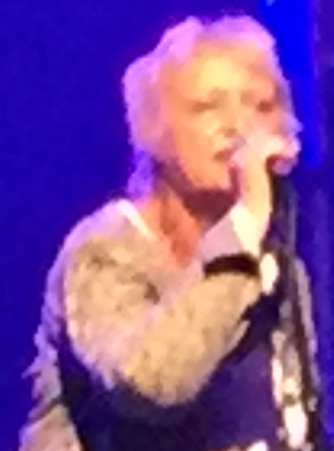
- Holland performing in 2016
- Born: Amy Celeste Boersma; August 15, 1953 (age 73); Palisades, New York, U.S.
- Occupation: Singer
- Years active: 1980–present
- Spouse: Michael McDonald (m. 1983)
- Children: 2
- Musical career
- Genres: Pop; rock; country pop; adult contemporary
- Labels: Capitol; EMI; Chonin
- Website: amyhollandmusic.com

Amy Celeste Boersma (born August 15, 1953), known professionally as Amy Holland, is an American pop and rock singer. Her career spans more than 40 years. She received a Grammy Award nomination for Best New Artist in 1981, following her self-titled debut album containing the single "How Do I Survive".

== Early life ==
Amy Celeste Boersma was born in Palisades, New York, into a musical family. Her mother was country singer Esmereldy and her father was opera singer Harry Boersma. Holland is of Dutch descent and changed her name from Boersma to Holland (after her ancestors' origin country), because she thought it would make a better stage name.

As a teenager, Holland moved to Los Angeles in hope of making a career as a singer-songwriter. At the age of 15 she auditioned for the Beach Boys' Brother Records, but after the company folded, she signed with Capitol Records instead.

== Career ==
Holland's eponymous debut studio album, produced by the Doobie Brothers' co-frontman and her later husband Michael McDonald, was released in 1980 and featured the hit "How Do I Survive", which peaked at No. 22 on the U.S. Billboard Hot 100 chart. Her second studio album titled On Your Every Word followed in 1983, featuring the single "Ain't Nothing Like the Real Thing" a duet with Chris Christian, which peaked at No. 88 on the Billboard Hot 100, and it also peaked at No. 21 on the Adult Contemporary chart. That same year, she contributed two songs to the soundtrack to the film Scarface. One of the songs Holland recorded for Scarface, "She's on Fire", was also featured in the video game Grand Theft Auto III. Holland went on to sing backing vocals on McDonald's albums, in addition to singing backing vocals on albums by other artists and bands such as First Call.

In 2008, Holland released her third studio album, The Journey to Miracle River, on Chonin Records. Produced by her long-time friend Bernie Chiaravalle (singer/guitarist for McDonald since 1988), the album was recorded in Nashville over an eight-year period. Holland co-wrote 10 of the 12 songs with Chiaravalle along with other writers John Goodwin, Jon Vezner, and McDonald. Other songs were also penned by Robben Ford and Chazz Frichtel. This album marked Holland's return to the music industry after several years of hiatus to raise a family and deal with health issues.

In 2016, she released her fourth studio album, Light on My Path. The album features a duet, "Prove That by Me" with Michael McDonald, in addition to background vocals by David Pack (Ambrosia), Joseph Williams (Toto), and David Crosby.

== Personal life ==
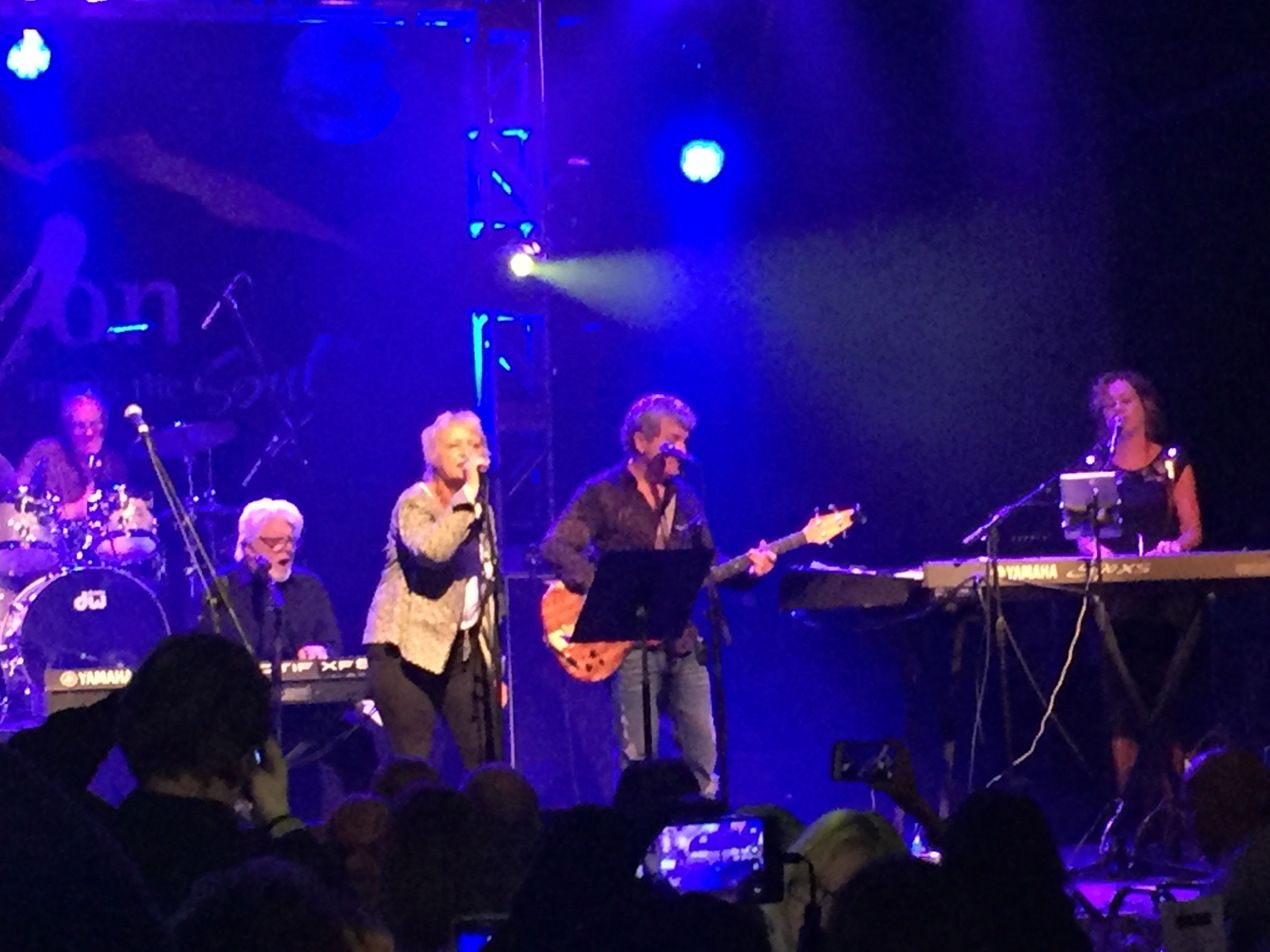
Holland performing with her husband and fellow musician Michael McDonald and Ambrosia in 2016

Holland has been married to musician Michael McDonald since 1983. The couple live in Santa Barbara, California, and they have two children.

In 1995, Holland was diagnosed with cancer, and after many years of therapy, she is now in good health.

== Discography ==
=== Studio albums ===
- Amy Holland (Capitol, 1980) U.S. #146
- On Your Every Word (Capitol, 1983) (re-released by EMI in 2005)
- The Journey to Miracle River (Chonin, 2008)
- Light on My Path (Choni, 2016)

=== Singles ===
- "How Do I Survive?" US #22, US AC #34
- "Ain't Nothing Like the Real Thing/You're All I Need to Get By" (duet with Chris Christian) US #88, US AC #21
- "Anytime You Want Me" US #110
- "Shake Me, Wake Me (When It's Over)"
- "(I Hang) On Your Every Word"
- "I'll Never Give Up"
- "She's on Fire"
- "Turn Out the Night"
- "Learn to Love Again" (duet with Chris Farren)
- "Shootin' For the Moon"

== Filmography ==
=== Film soundtracks ===
- Scarface (1983) — "Turn Out the Night" (miscredited as "Turn Out the Light") and "She's on Fire"
- Night of the Comet (1984) — "Learn to Love Again" (duet with Chris Farren)
- Love Lives On (1985) — "Lullaby" (duet with David Palmer)
- Teen Wolf (1985) — "Shootin' for the Moon"
- St. Elmo's Fire (1985) — "For Just a Moment (Love Theme from St. Elmo's Fire)" (duet with Donny Gerrard)
- Square Dance (1987) — "Home"
- The Lion of Africa (1987) — "Nothin' We Can Do" (duet with Chris Farren)
- K-9 (1989) — "Iko Iko"

=== Television ===
- Young Oh! Oh! (1980) — "How Do I Survive"
- Solid Gold (1980) — "How Do I Survive"
- Auf Los Geht's Los (1980) — "Strengthen My Love", "How Do I Survive", "Stars"
- Toppop (1980) — "How Do I Survive", "Stars"
- The Kenny Everett Video Show (1980) — "Strengthen My Love", "How Do I Survive", "Show Me the Way Home"
- Music Fair (1980) — "How Do I Survive"
- American Bandstand (1983) — "(I Hang) On Your Every Word", "Shake Me, Wake Me (When It's Over)"
- One Life to Live (1994) — "All I Know" (duet with Michael McDonald)
