= Walking on a Wire =

Compilation album by Richard Thompson
- Released: August 26, 2009
- Label: Shout! Factory

Walking on a Wire is a 2009 compilation CD set of songs by Richard Thompson. It was released on August 26, 2009, a set of four CDs. The set contains the bulk of Thompson's songs, but contains no unreleased material.

== Track listing ==
=== Disc: 1 ===
1. Time Will Show The Wiser - Fairport Convention
2. Meet On The Ledge - Fairport Convention
3. Genesis Hall - Fairport Convention
4. Crazy Man Michael - Fairport Convention
5. Sloth - Fairport Convention
6. Roll Over Vaughn Williams
7. Poor Ditching Boy
8. The Angels Took My Racehorse Away
9. The Great Valerio - Richard & Linda Thompson
10. When I Get To The Border - Richard & Linda Thompson
11. Withered And Died - Richard & Linda Thompson
12. I Want To See The Bright Lights Tonight - Richard & Linda Thompson
13. Down Where The Drunkards Roll - Richard & Linda Thompson
14. Calvary Cross - Richard & Linda Thompson
15. I'll Regret It All In The Morning - Richard & Linda Thompson
16. Old Man Inside A Young Man - Richard & Linda Thompson
17. For Shame Of Doing Wrong - Richard & Linda Thompson
18. Night Comes In - Richard & Linda Thompson

=== Disc: 2 ===
1. Dimming Of The Day/Dargai - Richard & Linda Thompson
2. A Heart Needs A Home - Richard & Linda Thompson
3. Don't Let A Thief Steal Into Your Heart - Richard & Linda Thompson
4. Strange Affair - Richard & Linda Thompson
5. Sunnyvista - Richard & Linda Thompson
6. Sisters - Richard & Linda Thompson
7. Rockin' In Rhythm
8. Did She Jump Or Was She Pushed - Richard & Linda Thompson
9. Man In Need - Richard & Linda Thompson
10. Shoot Out The Lights - Richard & Linda Thompson
11. Wall Of Death - Richard & Linda Thompson
12. Walking On A Wire - Richard & Linda Thompson
13. Tear Stained Letter
14. How I Wanted To
15. Hand Of Kindness
16. Beat The Retreat
17. I Ain't Going To Drag My Feet No More

=== Disc: 3 ===
1. Little Blue Number
2. She Twists The Knife Again
3. Valerie
4. Turning Of The Tide
5. I Still Dream
6. Waltzing's For Dreamers
7. Read About Love
8. I Feel So Good
9. I Misunderstood
10. 1952 Vincent Black Lightning
11. Put Your Trust In Me
12. From Galway To Graceland
13. I Can't Wake Up To Save My Life
14. MGB GT
15. Mingus Eyes
16. Beeswing
17. Taking My Business Elsewhere
18. King Of Bohemia
19. Don't Roll Those Bloodshot Eyes At Me - with Danny Thompson
20. Razor Dance

=== Disc: 4 ===
1. Hide It Away
2. Last Shift - with Danny Thompson
3. Big Chimney - with Danny Thompson
4. Lotteryland - with Danny Thompson
5. Persuasion
6. Cooksferry Queen
7. Bathsheba Smiles
8. Hard On Me
9. Gethsemane
10. A Love You Can't Survive
11. A Legal Matter
12. Grizzly Man
13. Al Bowlly's In Heaven
14. I'll Never Give It Up
15. Dad's Gonna Kill Me
16. She Sang Angels To Rest

== Reception ==
Critical reception for the CD set was mixed to positive, with the majority of reviews praising Thompson's work as a whole while criticizing the lack of unreleased material. BBC Music and Pitchfork Media both echoed this sentiment, with Pitchfork Media remarking that it was "the closest thing Thompson's got to the career-spanning greatest-hits album he deserves-- but if you're not already part of his cult, it's more a moat than a drawbridge."
