= Minute by Minute (Grinspoon song) =

Single by Grinspoon

from the album Alibis & Other Lies
- Released: 8 December 2007
- Recorded: 2006
- Genre: Post-grunge; acoustic; soft rock
- Length: 4:07
- Label: Universal Records
- Songwriter(s): Phil Jamieson
- Producer(s): Ramesh Sathiah, Grinspoon

Grinspoon singles chronology
"'What You Got'" (2007)	"Minute by Minute" (2007)	"'Dogs'" (2009)

"Minute by Minute" is a song by Australian rock band Grinspoon and is the third single from the studio album Alibis & Other Lies. The single was initially a digital release however a CD single was released on 8 December 2007. The track "Blind Lead Blind" also features on a compilation CD titled Caution: Life Ahead, making the song available on hard disk. "Minute by Minute" is included in the various artists' 3× CD, Flood Relief: Artists for the Flood Appeal (January 2011), which raised money for victims of the Queensland floods of that year.

During his solo shows in March 2014, the song's writer, Phil Jamieson, performed a "funked-up version" of the track.

== Reception ==
In a review of Alibis & Other Lies, in August 2007, TheDwarf's LilBirdy looked for "slow, gentle Grinspoon tracks" with "Minute by Minute" receiving "the award" with its "beautiful string section, the track really pulls at the heart strings. It's an excellent example of the band's diversity. They're not that uncompromising straight up rock 'n' roll band they started out as over 13 years ago." Michael Olivotto of FasterLouder also praised the album's "Diversity is something this record has plenty of. Whether it's straws, strings and acoustics on 'Minute by Minute'..." SameSame's Nate C felt "Strings adds depth and heart as they swell behind lead singer Phil Jamieson in acoustic ballad 'Minute by Minute' – though it suffers when held up against 'Chemical Heart', their last notable dalliance with strings."

== Track listing ==
All tracks are written by Phil Jamieson

CD single
No.	Title	Length
1.	"Minute by Minute"	3:27
2.	"Blind Lead Blind" (unreleased version)	4:18
