= Bernie Chiaravalle =

American guitarist and singer-songwriter (born 1953)

Bernie Chiaravalle (born August 11, 1953) is an American guitarist and singer-songwriter. He is known for backing up Michael McDonald.

== Career ==
Chiaravalle was born in Port Hueneme, California. He studied piano as a child and still plays it. According to Chiaravalle, "I shifted my focus when I saw the Beatles on Ed Sullivan and that inspired me to want to be in a band." He then began to play the guitar.

He is the singer and guitarist for singer Michael McDonald, and has also written songs with McDonald since the late 1980s. He has been recording and touring with McDonald since 1988. Chiaravalle's career with McDonald started out by meeting singer-songwriter David Pack from the group Ambrosia who later introduced him to McDonald. He and McDonald collaborated on several songs which are on McDonald's 2000 album Blue Obsession. When the Doobie Brothers reunited with McDonald for a co-headlining tour with the Steve Miller Band in 1995, Chiaravalle filled in on guitar for the absent John McFee.

Chiaravalle has had success as a solo artist as well with a 1999 single, "Speak", and with the single "Till I Hurt You" on Larry Carlton's Fingerprints CD which he co-wrote with Larry Carlton and Michael McDonald. He also co-wrote "No Love To Be Found" with McDonald which can be found on Michael McDonald: The Ultimate Collection released in 2005. "From Now On", a blues song written with Steve Leland, has been used in TV jingles. "One More Word", another song written with McDonald, was a regional hit on KTWV in Los Angeles in the early 90s. The song was recorded under the name Silent Partner, a band with his friend Chazz Frichtel.

In 2013 Chiaravalle released the album All or Nothing, and continues to tour with McDonald. He also produced an album of 12 songs for singer Amy Holland (McDonald's wife) called "The Journey To Miracle River". Chiaravalle co-wrote much of the album along with her and other writers including Jon Vezner, John Goodwin, Frichtel and McDonald. He also plays guitar, bass, keyboards, drums and percussion on the record. It was released on McDonald's record label Chonin Records. The song "Miracle River" was later recorded by singer Judy Collins as a duet with Michael McDonald.

In 2018 Bernie had 2 new songs co-written with Michael McDonald "Wide Open". "Beautiful Child" (McDonald, Chiaravalle, Sabatino) and "Blessing in Disguise" (McDonald, Chapman, Peppard, Chiaravalle). In 2020, Chiaravalle released his tenth solo album entitled "This Is What I See".
