= What You Got (Grinspoon song) =

Single by Grinspoon

from the album Alibis & Other Lies
- Released: 15 September 2007
- Recorded: 2006
- Genre: Post-grunge
- Length: 2:53
- Label: Universal Music Australia
- Songwriters: Phil Jamieson and Matthew Strong
- Producers: Ramesh Sathiah, Grinspoon

Grinspoon singles chronology
"'Black Tattoo'" (2007)	"What You Got" (2007)	"'Minute By Minute'" (2007)

"What You Got" is the second single by Australian rock band Grinspoon from their fifth studio album Alibis & Other Lies. The song was co-written by Phil Jamieson and Matthew Strong (Custard), who is the bass player in Jamieson’s side project, Lost Gospel. The single was only released in a digital format on iTunes.

== Reception ==
Australian music website, The Dwarf, describes "What You Got" as being musically closer to "Hard Act to Follow" stating "It's short, sharp and 100% killer. Just how it should be."

Michael Olivotto of FasterLouder believes that the song "instantly wreaks of The Lost Gospel" and that whilst the song is good in its own right, it "stick(s) out from the rest of the album and would have been better left as B-side(s)s or for some other project."

SameSame's Nate C felt that ""What You Got" also sound(s) like the ‘debauched rock and roll’ of vintage Grinners and is sure to appeal to the band’s devoted and faithful.."

== Video ==
The video was filmed in the school gymnasium of Viewbank College. It features the band playing in a gymnasium while the screen flashes to people in still life. The video was produced by Lacey Fitzgerald and directed by James Teh (Peace Charger Productions).

== Track listing ==
All tracks are written by Phil Jamieson, Matt Strong

Digital single
No.	Title	Length
1.	"What You Got?"	3:27
2.	"What You Got?" (Live)	4:18
