= Mazik =

Mazyak مزيك
- Village
- Location within Iran
- Coordinates: 32°52′07″N 52°46′36″E
- Country: Iran
- Province: Isfahan
- County: Nain
- Bakhsh: Central
- Rural District: Kuhestan

Population (2006)
  - Total: 37
- Time zone: UTC+3:30 (IRST)
  - Summer (DST): UTC+4:30 (IRDT)

Mazyak (Persian: مزيك, also Romanized as Mazīk, Maziak, Mazik, and Mazyek) is a village in Kuhestan Rural District, in the Central District of Nain County, Isfahan Province, Iran. At the 2006 census, its population was 37, in 15 families.
