= John McFee =

American musician (born 1950)

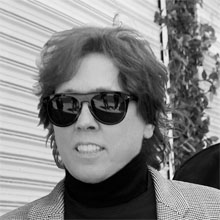
- McFee in 2010

Background information
- Born: September 9, 1950 (age 76); Santa Cruz, California, U.S.
- Genres: Rock; country; blues; jazz
- Occupations: Musician; singer; songwriter; record producer; recording engineer
- Instruments: Guitar; banjo; mandolin; violin; cello; harmonica; vocals
- Years active: 1966–present
- Website: Doobie Brothers official website

John McFee (born September 9, 1950) is an American singer, songwriter, guitarist, record producer, and multi-instrumentalist, and long-time member of The Doobie Brothers.

== Biography ==
Some of McFee's early and non-Doobie Brothers work includes playing pedal steel guitar on Van Morrison's Tupelo Honey and Saint Dominic's Preview albums, and recording with many other artists, including Steve Miller on his Fly Like An Eagle album, the Grateful Dead on their From the Mars Hotel album, and Boz Scaggs, Emmylou Harris, Link Wray, Rick James, Janis Ian, Ricky Skaggs, The Brothers Four, Nick Lowe, Wanda Jackson, Bill Wyman of the Rolling Stones, Crystal Gayle, Mike Bloomfield, John Michael Montgomery, the Beach Boys, Norton Buffalo, Twiggy, Eikichi Yazawa, Chicago, and The Kendalls.

McFee played for a number of years with Huey Lewis in the group Clover and also played on Huey Lewis and the News' Sports and Hard at Play albums. McFee also played with Glen Campbell, for his Meet Glen Campbell live video performance.

McFee has played on a number of Elvis Costello's albums, beginning with all the lead and pedal steel guitar work on My Aim is True; he played lead guitar on "Alison". He has also continued to perform live with Costello periodically through the years.

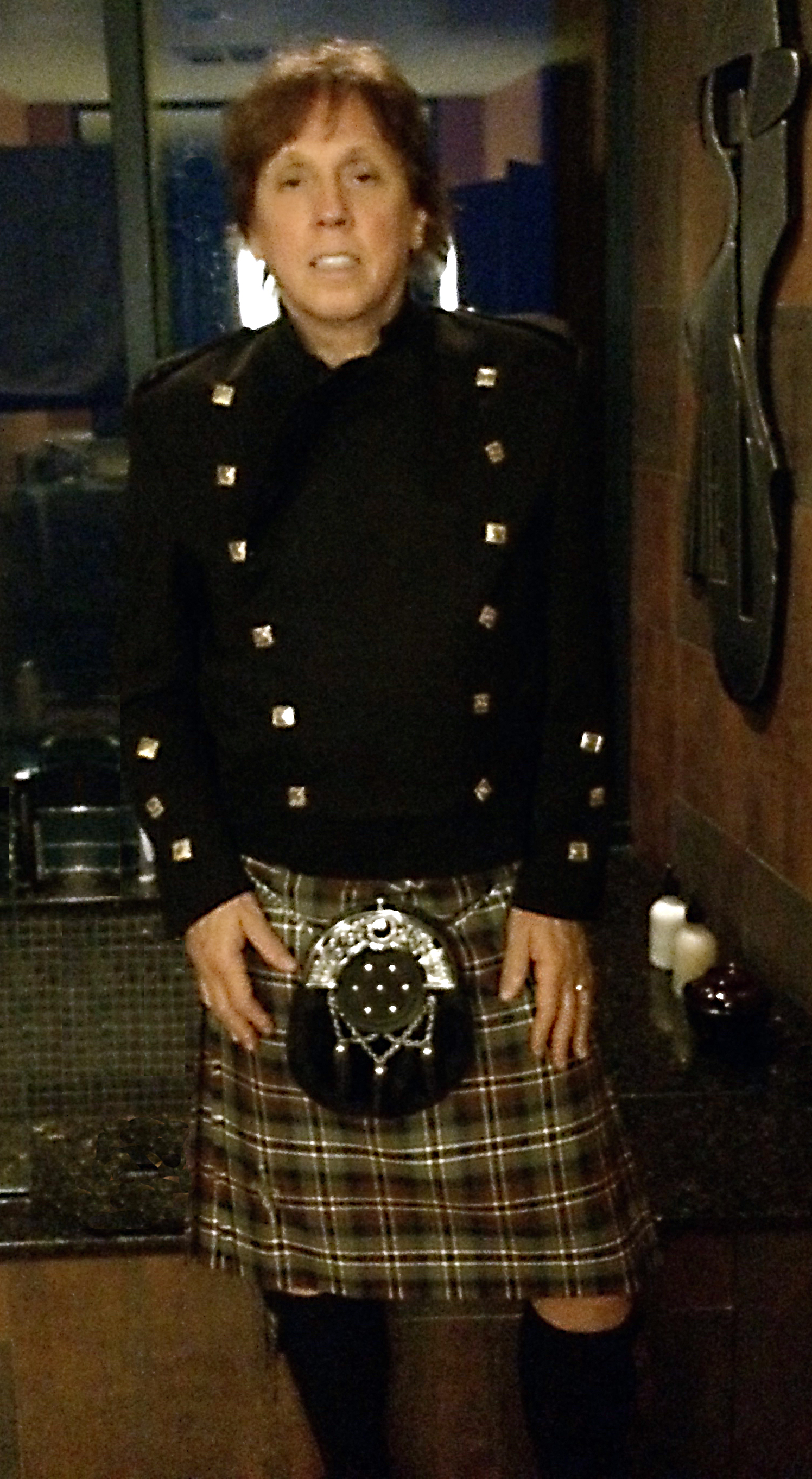
McFee in Big Sur, California, 2017

In early 1979, McFee joined the Doobie Brothers, replacing departing guitarist Jeff Baxter. McFee was first featured on the Doobies' ninth studio album One Step Closer, which achieved RIAA platinum album status, yet performed poorly compared to prior efforts with Baxter. Although McFee did not sing lead vocals on the song, he co-wrote the title track with Doobies drummer Keith Knudsen and Carlene Carter, as well as writing the Grammy-nominated instrumental "South Bay Strut" with co-drummer Chet McCracken. The album also reunited McFee with Doobies producer Ted Templeman, McFee having played on Templeman's first hit record as a producer (Van Morrison's "Wild Night" from the Tupelo Honey album).

After the Doobie Brothers disbanded in late 1982, McFee and Knudsen formed the country-rock group Southern Pacific, which also included ex-Creedence Clearwater Revival bassist Stu Cook, former Pablo Cruise vocalist David Jenkins, and keyboardist Kurt Howell. The group achieved a high level of success limited to national country charts, starting with their debut single reaching the top ten – a duet with Emmylou Harris on the Tom Petty composition "Thing About You", and going on to numerous other top ten records, including the number one songs "New Shade of Blue" and "Honey I Dare You", both of which McFee wrote. Southern Pacific was named New Country Group of the Year when they debuted and have been honored by having their name added to the Country Music Association's Walkway of Stars in Nashville, Tennessee.

In 1983, McFee played pedal steel guitar on the song "Honky Tonk Blues" from Huey Lewis and the News's Sports album, a song which was made famous by country legend Hank Williams Sr. In 1989, Southern Pacific had two songs – "Reno Bound" and "Any Way The Wind Blows" – appear in the Clint Eastwood film Pink Cadillac. McFee co-wrote both of the songs. The songs reached the top five on the country charts, and McFee can be heard on lead vocals on both tracks in the movie. Though McFee and Knudsen were committed to Southern Pacific, they co-wrote the song "Time Is Here And Gone" on the Doobies' 1989 reunion album Cycles with late Doobies percussionist Bobby LaKind. McFee has received numerous BMI awards as a songwriter.

By 1993, Southern Pacific had disbanded and both men had rejoined the Doobie Brothers. McFee and Knudsen contributed to 2000's Sibling Rivalry, on which McFee sings the lead vocal on the song "Angels of Madness", of which he was a co-writer, and McFee also co-wrote "Five Corners" with Patrick Simmons. In 2007, McFee assumed a role onstage as a relief lead vocalist for Tom Johnston because of Johnston's throat ailment.

In 1995, McFee produced an album by Moby Grape founding member Peter Lewis. Moby Grape was a major influence on the Doobie Brothers, as well as on many other bands including Led Zeppelin and McFee's former group Clover. The collaboration of McFee (who, besides producing and engineering, contributed background vocals, guitars, violin, harmonica, mandolin, and pedal steel) and Lewis resulted in the album Peter Lewis, released by the German record label Taxim. Also making appearances on the album were former Eagle Randy Meisner, Creedence Clearwater Revival's Stu Cook, Doobie Brothers drummer Keith Knudsen, and Cornelius Bumpus (formerly with the Doobie Brothers and Steely Dan). The album received a rarely seen five star review from Rolling Stone magazine. McFee's long-term partnership with Knudsen ended with Knudsen's death from pneumonia in 2005.

In 2007, McFee produced and engineered Carlene Carter's album Stronger, playing almost all the instruments himself.

In 2010, he produced and engineered Hawaiianized by singer Pamela Polland. McFee also contributed on eight-string tenor ukulele, slack key guitar, acoustic and electric Hawaiian steel guitars, nylon string guitar, acoustic bass, keyboards, percussion, vocal arrangements, and background vocals for this project.

Also in 2010, the Doobie Brothers released World Gone Crazy, on which McFee contributed as recording engineer, as well as playing acoustic guitars, banjo, slide guitar, mandolin, percussion, violin, drums, electric guitars, vocals, and resonator guitars. The New York Post suggested that this album should be "Album of the Year", saying "Now they're back on track, with a smokin' mix of roadhouse boogies, classic rock and country."

In 2011, McFee played acoustic and electric guitars, pedal steel, banjo, Dobro, mandolin, and slide guitar on French singer/songwriter Hugues Aufray's project, Troubador Since 1948. Aufray is widely known as a compatriot of Bob Dylan since the folk era, having translated many of Dylan's songs into French.

In 2014, McFee played violin on the band Chicago's single release, "Naked In The Garden Of Allah".

Also in 2014, the John Cowan album Sixty was released, produced by McFee. Cowan was the lead vocalist and bass guitarist for the legendary progressive bluegrass group New Grass Revival, and in recent years has been touring and recording with the Doobie Brothers. The album Sixty features guest appearances by Alison Krauss, Leon Russell, Ray Benson, Chris Hillman, Rodney Crowell, Bonnie Bramlett, Jim Messina, Alison Brown, Sam Bush, John Jorgenson, Viktor Krauss, Bernie Leadon, Huey Lewis, Jay Dee Maness (Buck Owens and the Buckaroos), Josh Williams (Rhonda Vincent and the Rage), and others. On this project McFee also plays acoustic and electric guitars, pedal steel, Dobro, mandolin, violin, and other instruments as well as singing background vocals. Sixty was listed as one of the top Americana albums of 2014, and has been hailed as Cowan's "masterpiece" album.

2014 also saw the release of the Doobie Brothers album Southbound, a Nashville-based project which features high-profile country artists collaborating with the Doobie Brothers on historic Doobie Brothers songs. Examples would be Blake Shelton performing "Listen To The Music" (with Hunter Hayes on guitar), Zac Brown Band doing "Black Water”, Toby Keith singing "Long Train Running" (with Huey Lewis on harmonica), Chris Young performing "China Grove", Brad Paisley doing "Rocking Down The Highway". On this project McFee can be heard on banjo, slide resonator guitar, pedal steel, violin, autoharp, and electric and acoustic guitars, as well as background vocals. This project also saw Michael McDonald reunited with his fellow Doobie Brothers.

In 2015 McFee teamed up with John Jorgenson (Desert Rose Band, Hellecasters, Elton John) to co-produce singer-songwriter Lewis Storey for the project Storey Road. Lewis Storey was nominated for the Horizon Award (Best New Artist) by the Academy of Country Music Awards in 1988 and has won several Songwriters Guild of America awards.

The year 2016 involved extensive touring with the Doobie Brothers, co-headlining with the group Journey, and with Rock and Roll Hall of Fame inductee Dave Mason on the bill as well.

McFee was also involved with the artist Jeremiah Richey, on the recording project Northridge, on which McFee played electric guitar, pedal steel guitar, violin, Dobro, among other instruments, and was a co-writer of the song "Pretty Girl" produced by Rob Arthur.

Also in 2016, McFee played on Timothy B. Schmit's solo project Leap Of Faith, playing violin on the first single from the recording, "Red Dirt Road". Although McFee had performed in concert with Schmit on numerous occasions, this project was the first time the two had worked together on a studio recording project. McFee also toured with Schmit in January 2017, as well as performing again on tour dates in November and December 2017.

In 2020, McFee was inducted into the Rock and Roll Hall of Fame as a member of The Doobie Brothers.

== Discography ==
=== with The Doobie Brothers ===
- One Step Closer
- No Nukes
- In Harmony: A Sesame Street Record
- Farewell Tour
- Best Of The Doobies, Vol. 2
- Listen to the Music: The Very Best of The Doobie Brothers
- Rockin' down the Highway: The Wildlife Concert
- Best of the Doobie Brothers Live
- Greatest Hits
- Doobie's Choice
- Sibling Rivalry
- Long Train Runnin’: 1971–2000
- Live at Wolf Trap
- The Very Best of The Doobie Brothers
- World Gone Crazy
- Live at the Greek Theatre 1982
- Southbound
- Cycles
- Brotherhood
- Liberté

=== with others (incomplete) ===
- Hugues Aufray – Troubador Since 1948
- Mike Bloomfield – Bloomfield: A Retrospective
- Norton Buffalo – Lovin' In The Valley Of The Moon
- Norton Buffalo – Desert Horizon
- Carlene Carter – Musical Shapes
- Carlene Carter – Two Sides to Every Woman
- Carlene Carter – Stronger
- Chicago – Naked In The Garden Of Allah
- Elvis Costello – My Aim Is True
- Elvis Costello – Taking Liberties
- Elvis Costello – Almost Blue
- Elvis Costello – The Very Best Of Elvis Costello
- Elvis Costello – The Delivery Man
- John Cowan – Sixty
- Crystal Gayle – Straight To The Heart
- Crystal Gayle – The Best Of Crystal Gayle
- The Grateful Dead – Grateful Dead from the Mars Hotel
- The Grateful Dead – Beyond Description
- Emmylou Harris – White Shoes
- Emmylou Harris – All I Intended To Be
- Janis Ian – Present Company
- Wanda Jackson – Heart Trouble
- Rick James – Throwin' Down
- Rick James – Anthology
- The Kendalls – Movin' Train
- Nicolette Larson – Radioland
- Nicolette Larson – All Dressed Up and No Place to Go
- Huey Lewis and the News – Sports
- Huey Lewis and the News – Hard at Play
- Huey Lewis and the News – Weather
- Peter Lewis – Peter Lewis
- Nick Lowe – Jesus Of Cool aka Pure Pop for Now People
- Steve Miller – Fly Like An Eagle
- Steve Miller – Greatest Hits: 1974–78
- John Michael Montgomery – What I Do The Best
- John Michael Montgomery – The Very Best Of John Michael Montgomery
- Van Morrison – Tupelo Honey
- Van Morrison – Saint Dominic's Preview
- Van Morrison – The Essential Van Morrison
- Van Morrison – At the Movies: Soundtrack Hits
- Jeremiah Richey – Northridge
- Boz Scaggs – Moments
- Ricky Scaggs – Solid Ground
- Timothy B. Schmit – Leap Of Faith
- Southern Pacific – Southern Pacific
- Southern Pacific – Killbilly Hill
- Southern Pacific – County Line
- Southern Pacific – Zuma
- Southern Pacific – Greatest Hits
- Southern Pacific – Pink Cadillac Original Motion Picture Soundtrack
- Lewis Storey – Storey Road
- Twiggy – Please Get My Name Right
- Link Wray – Be What You Want To
- Bill Wyman – Stone Alone
- Eikichi Yazawa – Anytime Woman
- Eikichi Yazawa – Rock 'n' Roll
- Eikichi Yazawa – Subway Express
