= Minute by Minute =

Studio album by the Doobie Brothers
- Released: December 1, 1978
- Recorded: 1978
- Studios: Warner Bros. Studios, North Hollywood; Mixed at Sunset Sound Recorders, Hollywood
- Genres: Pop rock; soft rock; blue-eyed soul; R&B
- Length: 36:16
- Label: Warner Bros.
- Producer: Ted Templeman

The Doobie Brothers chronology
Livin' on the Fault Line (1977)	Minute by Minute (1978)	One Step Closer (1980)

Singles from Minute by Minute
- 1. "What a Fool Believes" b/w "Don't Stop to Watch the Wheels" Released: January 1979; 2. "Minute by Minute" b/w "Sweet Feelin'" Released: April 25, 1979; 3. "Dependin' on You" b/w "How Do the Fools Survive?" Released: July 25, 1979

Minute by Minute is the eighth studio album by American rock band the Doobie Brothers, released on December 1, 1978, by Warner Bros. Records. It was their last album to include members John Hartman (until 1989's Cycles) and Jeff "Skunk" Baxter.

The album spent 87 weeks on the Billboard 200 chart. In the spring of 1979 Minute by Minute was the best-selling album in the U.S. for five non-consecutive weeks. It was certified 3× Platinum by the RIAA.

The song "What a Fool Believes" hit No. 1 on the Billboard Hot 100 in April 1979 and became the band's biggest hit. The title track and "Depending on You" were also released as singles and reached the top 30.

Minute by Minute made the Doobie Brothers one of the big winners at the 22nd Grammy Awards. The album got the trophy for Best Pop Vocal Performance by a Duo or Group and received a nomination for Album of the Year. The single "What a Fool Believes" earned them three Grammys, including Song and Record of the Year.

== Critical reception ==
Professional ratings
Review scores
Source	Rating
AllMusic	4/5 stars
Christgau's Record Guide	B
The Encyclopedia of Popular Music	4/5 stars
The Great Rock Discography	7/10
(The New) Rolling Stone Album Guide	3/5 stars

Rolling Stone concluded that, "with all the firepower this band has—one of rock's strongest rhythm sections, several writers and vocalists, an excellent lead guitarist and a remarkable lead singer—the Doobie Brothers shouldn't be content merely to skirt greatness."

== Track listing ==
Side one
No.	Title	Writer(s)	Lead vocals	Length
1.	"Here to Love You"	Michael McDonald	Michael McDonald	3:58
2.	"What a Fool Believes"	McDonald; Kenny Loggins	McDonald	3:41
3.	"Minute by Minute"	McDonald; Lester Abrams	McDonald	3:26
4.	"Dependin' on You"	McDonald; Patrick Simmons	Patrick Simmons	3:44
5.	"Don't Stop to Watch the Wheels"	Simmons; Jeff Baxter; Michael Ebert	Simmons	3:26

Side two
No.	Title	Writer(s)	Lead vocals	Length
6.	"Open Your Eyes"	McDonald; Abrams; Patrick Henderson	McDonald	3:18
7.	"Sweet Feelin'"	Simmons; Ted Templeman	Simmons, Nicolette Larson	2:41
8.	"Steamer Lane Breakdown"	Simmons	instrumental	3:24
9.	"You Never Change"	Simmons	McDonald, Simmons	3:26
10.	"How Do the Fools Survive?"	McDonald; Carole Bayer Sager	McDonald	5:12

== Personnel ==
=== The Doobie Brothers ===
- Michael McDonald – piano, keyboards, organ, synthesizers, lead vocals (1–3, 6, 9, 10), backing vocals
- Patrick Simmons – guitars, lead vocals (4, 5, 7, 9), backing vocals
- Jeffrey Baxter – guitars
- Tiran Porter – bass, backing vocals
- John Hartman – drums, percussion
- Keith Knudsen – drums, percussion, backing vocals

==== Additional musicians ====
- Ted Templeman – drums (2), additional percussion
- Bobby LaKind – congas, backing vocals
- Tom Johnston – backing vocals (5)
- Nicolette Larson – duet vocals (7), backing vocals (4)
- Rosemary Butler – backing vocals (1, 4)
- Norton Buffalo – harmonica (5, 8)
- Herb Pedersen – banjo (8)
- Byron Berline – fiddle (8)
- Lester Abrams – electric piano (10)
- Bill Payne – synthesizer (2, 3)
- Andrew Love – saxophone (1, 4, 10)
- Ben Cauley – trumpet (1, 4, 10)
- Novi Novog – synthesizer solo (6)
- Sumner Mering – guitar (6)

=== Technical ===
- Produced by Ted Templeman
- Engineered by Donn Landee
- Additional engineers – Loyd Clifft and Steve Malcolm
- Photography – David Alexander
- Design coordination – Bruce Steinberg
- Production coordination – Beth Naranjo
- Publicity – David Gest

== Charts ==
=== Weekly charts ===
Chart (1978–79)	Peak position
Australian Albums (Kent Music Report)	6
Canada Top Albums/CDs (RPM)	1
Dutch Albums (Album Top 100)	72
New Zealand Albums (RMNZ)	6
Swedish Albums (Sverigetopplistan)	46
US Billboard 200	1

=== Year-end charts ===
Chart (1979)	Position
Canada Top Albums/CDs (RPM)	7
New Zealand Albums (RMNZ)	29
US Billboard 200	3

== Certifications ==
Region	Certification	Certified units/sales
Canada (Music Canada)	Platinum	100,000^{^}
New Zealand (RMNZ)	Gold	7,500^{‡}
United States (RIAA)	3× Platinum	3,000,000^{^}
^{^} Shipments figures based on certification alone.^{‡} Sales+streaming figures based on certification alone.
