= Chet McCracken =

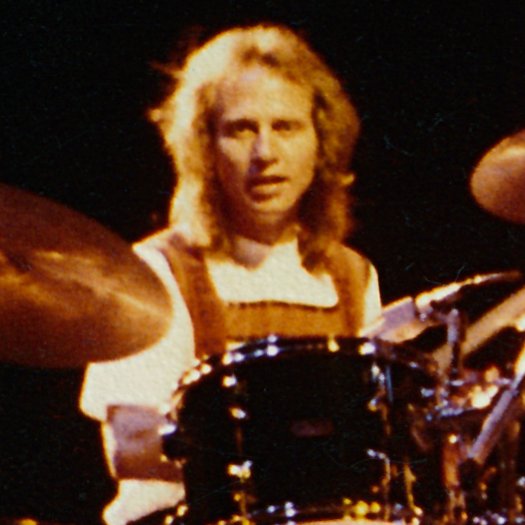
- McCracken with the Doobie Brothers in 1981.

Background information
- Born: Chester Eugene McCracken; September 20, 1946; Tacoma, Washington, U.S.
- Died: February 11, 2022 (aged 75) West Hills, California, U.S.
- Occupations: Musician; drummer; songwriter; recording engineer
- Instruments: Drums; percussion
- Years active: 1972–2022
- Formerly of: Evergreen Blueshoes; Help; The Doobie Brothers
- Spouse: Deborah Walley (m. 1968; div. 1975)

Chester Eugene McCracken (September 20, 1946 – February 11, 2022) was an American drummer and recording, mixing, and mastering engineer. He was a former member and contributing songwriter of American rock band the Doobie Brothers. In 1981, his song "South Bay Strut" (from the album One Step Closer) was nominated for a Grammy at the 23rd Annual Grammy Awards. Also a recording studio owner, he was a recording engineer who was experienced in mixing and mastering records.

== Career ==
McCracken's professional career began in 1969 as a member of the band Evergreen Blueshoes. They released one album. He was then a member of the psychadelic trio Help, releasing two albums. He toured with singer/songwriter Danny O'Keefe in 1972 and Rare Earth in 1975. As a session musician, he recorded with America, Snail, Hank Williams Jr., Helen Reddy, Amy Holland, Eikichi Yazawa, Stevie Nicks, Rita Coolidge, Joe Walsh, Tina Turner, Pat Boone, and many others.

In 1979, McCracken joined the Doobie Brothers replacing original drummer John Hartman. He remained in the band until their first hiatus in 1982. In the following years, he performed with the band in 1987 for their brief 12-city reunion tour benefiting the Vietnam Veterans Aid Foundation, organized by former Doobie Brothers bandmate Keith Knudsen. He also filled in for drummer Michael Hossack after he suffered an injury in July 1993. Additionally, he joined the Doobie Brothers on their 1995 "Dreams Come True" tour, co-headlining with the Steve Miller Band.

In 1999, McCracken was part of a Doobie Brothers tribute band with fellow former members Cornelius Bumpus and Dave Shogren. This tribute band included Billy Martin (keyboards/vocals), Allen Carman (bass/vocals) and Todd Plant (lead vocals). Chris Pinnick (former guitarist of Chicago) was also added at a later date. The Doobie Brothers obtained an injunction preventing this band from performing under any variation of the "Doobie Brothers" name.

== Personal life ==
On December 6, 1968, McCracken married actress Deborah Walley. They divorced in 1975.

McCracken died on February 11, 2022, in West Hills, California.

== Solo Discography ==
- Flight to Moscow – 1990
- Partners – 1991 (featuring Chris Pinnick)
- After the Rain – 1994
- Tequila – 1996 (featuring Sam Riney)
