= Cornelius Bumpus =

American musician (1945–2004)

Background information
- Born: Cornelius Bumpus, Jr. May 7, 1945; Dallas, Texas, U.S.
- Origin: Santa Cruz, California
- Died: February 3, 2004 (aged 58) Sioux City, Iowa, U.S.
- Genres: Jazz; rock
- Occupation: Musician
- Instruments: Saxophone; flute; keyboards; vocals
- Formerly of: Doobie Brothers; Steely Dan
- Website: corneliusbumpus.com

Cornelius Bumpus (May 7, 1945 – February 3, 2004) was an American woodwind, brass and keyboard player and vocalist from Santa Cruz, California.

== Biography ==
Bumpus began his musical career playing alto saxophone at ten for his school band, and by age twelve he was playing at Luso-American dances. He attended Santa Cruz High School where he performed in the band and won the John Philip Sousa Award. He also played school dances with his own band, Corny and the Corvettes. In 1966 he was in Bobby Freeman's band and after that he began his association with many well-known groups.

His role in these bands was primarily as a saxophonist and organist. His most notable touring was with the Doobie Brothers and Steely Dan. Bumpus toured with Steely Dan from 1993 to 2003. In 2002, he worked on the Big Blue Earth project sponsored by the Church of Christ, Scientist. During the 1980s, Bumpus enjoyed a short tenure with Café Society, a Los Angeles pop band, in which he played in a horn section with the trombonist Dan Levine and trumpeter Anne Petereit King.

In 1981, Bumpus issued his first solo LP, A Clear View, which featured his singing, writing and sax playing, stretching out with the band on several, long, jazzy jams over six minutes each.

In 1999 Bumpus was part of a Doobie Brothers tribute band with fellow former members Chet McCracken and Dave Shogren. Also in that band was Billy Martin (keyboards/vocals), Allen Carman (bass/vocals) and Todd Plant (lead vocals). Chris Pinnick, former guitarist for Chicago, was added at a later date. The Doobie Brothers obtained an injunction preventing this band from performing under any variation of the "Doobie Brothers" name.

Bumpus suffered a heart attack on February 3, 2004, while on an airline flight from New York to California, where he was scheduled to perform at the Columbia College Jazz Series. The plane made an emergency landing in Sioux City, Iowa, so he could get medical assistance, but Bumpus had died by the time the plane reached the ground. He was 58 at the time of his death.

== Discography ==
Solo

- A Clear View – 1981
- Known Fact – 1999

With the Cornelius Bumpus Quartet

- Beacon – 1983

With Clifford Coulter

- East Side San Jose (Impulse!, 1970)

With The Doobie Brothers

- One Step Closer (Warner Bros., 1980)
- Farewell Tour (Warner Bros., 1983)
- Rockin' down the Highway: The Wildlife Concert (Sony, 1996)
- Live at the Greek Theatre 1982 (Eagle, 2011)

With Donald Fagen

- Rock and Soul Revue, Live at the Beacon (Giant, 1991)
- Kamakiriad (Reprise, 1993)

With Moby Grape

- Live Grape (Escape, 1978)

With Steely Dan

- Alive in America (Giant, 1995)
