= What a Fool Believes =

1978 song by Kenny Loggins

Song by Kenny Loggins

from the album Nightwatch
- Released: July 12, 1978
- Studio: Sound Mixers (New York City, New York)
- Genre: Soft rock
- Length: 3:37
- Label: Columbia
- Songwriters: Kenny Loggins; Michael McDonald
- Producer: Bob James

Audio
- "What a Fool Believes" on YouTube

"What a Fool Believes" is a song written by Michael McDonald and Kenny Loggins and first recorded and released by Loggins on his 1978 album Nightwatch. The best-known version was recorded by the American rock band the Doobie Brothers (with McDonald singing lead vocals) for their eighth album Minute by Minute (1978). Debuting at number 73 on January 20, 1979, the single reached number 1 on the Billboard Hot 100 on April 14, 1979, for one week. The song received Grammy Awards in 1980 for both Song of the Year and Record of the Year. In 2024, the song was inducted into the Grammy Hall of Fame.

== Composition ==
Michael McDonald and Kenny Loggins, who had wanted to collaborate for some time, wrote the song together in Los Angeles. Loggins went to McDonald's house and heard him playing a tune on piano, and suggested they work on that as he already had a hook line, "She had a place in his life" in mind. The song they wrote was influenced by songs they grew up listening to such as the Four Seasons' "Sherry" and "Walk Like a Man". They finished the song by the following day.

== Kenny Loggins recording ==
Both Loggins and McDonald recorded the song around the same time. Loggins' version was a creative arrangement with record producer Bob James. Loggins released his version of "What a Fool Believes" five months prior to the Doobie Brothers' version on his second studio album Nightwatch, released on July 12, 1978.

== The Doobie Brothers version ==
"What a Fool Believes"
- U.S. 7-inch vinyl picture sleeve (also used for the parent album)

Single by the Doobie Brothers

from the album Minute by Minute
- B-side: "Don't Stop to Watch the Wheels"
- Released: January 1979
- Recorded: August 1978
- Studio: Warner Bros. Recording Studios (North Hollywood, Los Angeles)
- Genre: Soft rock; yacht rock; blue-eyed soul; synth-pop
- Length: 3:41
- Label: Warner Bros.
- Songwriters: Michael McDonald; Kenny Loggins
- Producer: Ted Templeman

The Doobie Brothers singles chronology
"Nothin' But a Heartache" (1977)	"What a Fool Believes" (1979)	"Minute by Minute" (1979)

Audio
- "What a Fool Believes" on YouTube

The Doobie Brothers, with McDonald on lead vocals, recorded a version with record producer Ted Templeman. They recorded numerous takes of its rhythm track over five or six days, but had a problem finding a version that they liked, so Templeman ended up playing drums with Keith Knudsen to try to achieve a "floppy feel" with the song. Templeman eventually decided, to the band's horror, to cut up the master tape of a recording into sections, and put together a usable version. McDonald came up with the rest of the arrangement, adding keyboards, vocals and strings to the song. The resulting song was stylistically unlike any song the Doobie Brothers had done before. Templeman was still not satisfied with the result; when he played the song to the executives of Warner Bros., he suggested discarding the song, but they said: "Are you crazy? That's great!"

In December 1978, five months after Loggins' original recording was released, the Doobie Brothers included their version on their eighth studio album Minute by Minute, with their version being released as a single the following month. This is the best-known version of the song, debuting at number 73 on the Billboard Hot 100 on January 20, 1979, and then reaching number one on April 14, 1979, for one week.

This version received Grammy Awards in 1980 for both Song of the Year and Record of the Year.

Apparently as a joke, Michael Jackson claimed in a videotaped phone conversation with British and American actress Elizabeth Taylor in 2003 that he contributed at least one backing track to the original Doobie Brothers recording, but was not credited for having done so. Entertainment Tonight broadcast this claim with viewers being unaware that Jackson was joking. The band later denied his participation.

This version of the song appeared in the action-adventure game Grand Theft Auto V (2013), on the fictional radio station Los Santos Rock Radio, which also featured Loggins as the radio host. The song was later featured in the season 3 finale of Lioness.

=== Critical reception ===
Billboard praised the vocal performance, synthesizers and production. The reviewer described the song as building from a melodic first verse "to a heart warming hook chorus". Cashbox said it has an "easy funk backing, strings overhead and characteristically unique vocals which soar upwards." Record World said that in the song the Doobie Brothers go to "an easy-going beat with distinctive lead and high harmony hook."

Ultimate Classic Rock critic Michael Gallucci rated "What a Fool Believes" as the Doobie Brothers all-time greatest song, particularly praising "McDonald's soulful vocals and soft and warm keyboard riffs." In 2021, it was listed at No. 344 on Rolling Stone's list of the "500 Greatest Songs of All Time".

The song was named by the 2005 Yacht Rock web series as a key example of the yacht rock genre. Web comedians J. D. Ryznar, Hunter Stair, David B. Lyons and Steve Huey gave "What a Fool Believes" a top score of 100 as having the highest possible amount of "yacht", setting the standard for yacht rock songs.

=== Personnel ===
- Patrick Simmons – guitar, backing vocals
- Jeff "Skunk" Baxter – guitar
- Michael McDonald – lead and backing vocals, piano, Oberheim Polyphonic Eight Voice synthesizers
- Tiran Porter – bass guitar, backing vocals
- Keith Knudsen – drums, backing vocals

Additional players

- Ted Templeman – drums
- Bill Payne – Oberheim Polyphonic Eight Voice (with Michael McDonald)
- Bobby LaKind – congas, backing vocals

=== Charts ===
==== Weekly charts ====
Chart (1979)	Peak position
Australia (Kent Music Report)	12
Belgium (Ultratop 50 Flanders)	16
Canada RPM Top Singles	1
Canada RPM Adult Contemporary	1
Ireland (IRMA)	28
Netherlands (Single Top 100)	10
New Zealand (RIANZ)	5
UK Singles (Official Charts)	31
US Billboard Hot 100	1
US Adult Contemporary (Billboard)	22
US Billboard Dance Club Songs	40
US Cash Box Top 100	1

==== Year-end charts ====
Chart (1979)	Rank
Australia (Kent Music Report)	75
Canada	31
New Zealand	37
US Billboard Hot 100	19
US Cash Box Top 100	5

=== Certifications ===
Region	Certification	Certified units/sales
New Zealand (RMNZ)	2× Platinum	60,000^{‡}
United Kingdom (BPI)	Silver	200,000^{‡}
United States (RIAA)	Gold	1,000,000^{^}
^{^} Shipments figures based on certification alone.^{‡} Sales+streaming figures based on certification alone.

== Other versions by Loggins and McDonald or the Doobie Brothers ==
In 1978, Warner Brothers released a 12-inch single disco version by the Doobie Brothers (backed with "Don't Stop to Watch the Wheels"), which peaked at number 40 on Billboard's National Disco Action chart in April 1979. Mixed by disco record producer Jim Burgess, at 5:31 the song is considerably longer than the 3:41 versions on the 7-inch single and the Minute by Minute LP. The 12-inch version also has a more pronounced bass-driven drumbeat.

A reissue of the single was released in 1987 credited to the Doobie Brothers featuring Michael McDonald. It was included on McDonald's compilation album Sweet Freedom (1986) and was credited as Michael McDonald with the Doobie Brothers. It reached No. 57 on the UK singles chart in January 1987.

A version featuring Sara Evans is included on the Doobie Brothers' album Southbound (2014).

== Other notable versions ==
In 1980, the song was covered by Aretha Franklin for her album Aretha. This version hit number 46 on the UK pop chart. Franklin's version also reached Number 17 on the US R&B chart and Number 39 on the US Dance chart in 1981.

The British band Matt Bianco released a cover of "What a Fool Believes" on their fourth album Samba in Your Casa in 1991. The song served as the album's final single, and reached number 23 on the Irish Singles Chart in early 1992.

In 1998, Peter Cox of Go West had a top 40 hit in the UK, with his version coming from the 1998 reissue of his self-titled debut album.

The American pop rock band Self covered the song on their fourth album Gizmodgery, released on September 5, 2000. Although not released as a single, the cover reached number 69 on Japan's Top 100 Alternative Songs in 2020. Carlos Ramirez of No Echo praised Matt Mahaffey's ability to differentiate himself from the Doobie Brothers' version.
