= Bobby LaKind =

American musician (1945–1992)

- Born: Robert Jay LaKind; November 3, 1945; New York, U.S.
- Died: December 24, 1992 (aged 47) Los Angeles, California, U.S.
- Genres: Rock
- Occupations: Musician; vocalist; songwriter
- Instruments: Percussion; drums; vocals
- Formerly of: The Doobie Brothers

Robert Jay LaKind (November 3, 1945 – December 24, 1992) was an American conga player, vocalist, songwriter and occasional backup drummer with the Doobie Brothers. Originally a stage manager and lighting roadie for the band, he was invited to join as a sideman for studio sessions after band members noticed his talent when LaKind goofed around on the congas after a concert.

LaKind was from Teaneck, New Jersey and graduated from Teaneck High School as part of the class of 1963. He attended the University of Kentucky and was a member of Sigma Nu fraternity, the Animal House of the university's fraternities during the 1960s. Also a member of Sigma Nu during this time was basketball player and future coach Pat Riley.

LaKind was a session man with the Doobie Brothers from 1976 and joined them onstage as well. When the band appeared as guest stars on What's Happening!! in early 1978, he was portrayed as a full member. However, he was not actually credited as such on an album until the release of Farewell Tour in 1983. On Live at the Greek Theatre 1982, recorded on the Farewell Tour, he sings lead on "Sweet Maxine".

When the band reformed in 1988, he rejoined and was featured on the album Cycles, but he was soon forced into retirement by illness.

During the Doobie Brothers hiatus, and with some overlap, between approximately 1985 to 1991, he was also a member of local Santa Monica Afro-Cuban band, The Bonedaddys. He played congas and other percussion and recorded at least two albums with them: A-Koo-De-A (1988) and Worldbeatniks (1991).

LaKind's former bandmates performed two benefit concerts in 1992 to raise money for a trust fund set up for LaKind's two sons, Nicky and Cutter. He died from colon cancer on December 24 that year, at age 47.
