= Patrick Henderson =

American musician (1949–2024)

Reverend Patrick Henderson (January 15, 1949 – January 14, 2024) was an American gospel keyboard player, songwriter and producer. He has written several songs in collaboration with Michael McDonald, playing on a number of his and the Doobie Brothers albums. Henderson has long associations with many other artists as well, including Leon Russell, Michael Bolton, Nils Lofgren and Freddie King. He won a Gospel Music Association "Dove Award" for Best Contemporary Gospel Record Song of the Year in 1990.

== Biography ==
Patrick Henderson was born in Dallas, Texas, in January 15, 1949.

Henderson contributed the story of how his hand was cut off by an insane fan to the 2006 book by David Ritz.

Henderson died on January 14, 2024, at the age of 74, a day shy of his 75th birthday.
