= The First of Me =

Studio album by Dennis Robbins
- Released: May 5, 1986
- Genre: Country
- Length: 37:57
- Label: MCA
- Producer: Eddie Kilroy; Dennis Robbins

Dennis Robbins chronology
The First of Me (1986)	Man with a Plan (1992)

Singles from Man with a Plan
- 1. "Hard Lovin' Man" Released: April 1986; 2. "The First of Me" Released: August 1986

The First of Me is the debut solo studio album by American country music singer-songwriter Dennis Robbins. It was released on May 5, 1986, via MCA Records. This is the only album Robbins released with MCA.

"Setting Me Up" was written by Mark Knopfler of Dire Straits, who recorded this song first, but the song became a hit for country group Highway 101, when released it as a single off their second album, 101².

"You're Not Drinking Enough" was written by Danny Krotchmar, who recorded this song first, but the song became a hit for Earl Thomas Conley, when released it as a single and peaked at number 26 on the Billboard Hot Country Songs chart, under the title "You Must Not Be Drinking Enough."

"Watermelon Time in Georgia" was written by Harlan Howard and has been recorded by several artists. Vernon Oxford was the first artist to record this song in 1966. Lefty Frizzell and Levon Helm are among some of the other artists who recorded this song.

"Rollin' Dice" co-written by Robbins was later re-recorded by Robbins and the other co-writers, Bob DiPiero and John Scott Sherrill, when they formed the country group Billy Hill on the album I Am Just a Rebel. It was also released on the soundtrack to the film Pink Cadillac starring Clint Eastwood.

== Critical reception ==
Billboard gave the album a review stating "Robbins draws on some heavyweight material from both the rock and country idioms for this uniformly strong launch project."

== Track listing ==
No.	Title	Writer(s)	Length
1.	"The First of Me"	Dennis Robbins, Bob DiPiero, John Scott Sherrill	3:09
2.	"Hard Lovin' Man"	Robbins, Bruce McTaggart, Warren Haynes	2:53
3.	"Setting Me Up"	Mark Knopfler	3:18
4.	"You're Not Drinking Enough"	Danny Krotchmar	4:19
5.	"Rollin' Dice"	Robbins, DiPiero, Sherrill	3:26
6.	"Watermelon Time in Georgia"	Harlan Howard	4:44
7.	"The Mountain Man and Me"	Robbins, Haynes, DeWayne Mize	5:32
8.	"Baby It's You"	Robbins, Haynes	4:38
9.	"Sweet Sweet Lovin'"	Robbins, Haynes	2:38
10.	"Full Moon Rising"	Robbins, McTaggart, Haynes, Steve Dansby, Ron Reynolds	3:20

== Personnel ==
- Donnie Backus – piano
- Richard Bennett – acoustic guitar (tracks 1, 2, 7, 8)
- David Briggs – Hammond organ (track 10), DX7 (track 4)
- Paul Davis – background vocals
- Bob DiPiero – background vocals
- Warren Haynes – electric guitar, background vocals
- Tommy Irwin – steel guitar
- Dave Kiswiney – bass guitar, background vocals
- Mark O'Connor – fiddle, mandolin
- Cindy Richardson – background vocals
- Dennis Robbins – lead vocals, background vocals, acoustic guitar, electric guitar, slide guitar
- Frankie Robbins – drums, percussion, background vocals
- John Scott Sherrill – background vocals
- Donna Wright – background vocals
