= Man with a Plan (Dennis Robbins album) =

Studio album by Dennis Robbins
- Released: June 16, 1992
- Genre: Country
- Length: 32:07
- Label: Giant
- Producer: Richard Landis; James Stroud

Dennis Robbins chronology
The First of Me (1986)	Man with a Plan (1992)	Born Ready (1994)

Singles from Man with a Plan
- 1. "Home Sweet Home" Released: April 1992; 2. "My Side of Town" Released: August 17, 1992; 3. "Good News, Bad News" Released: November 1992

Man with a Plan is the second solo studio album by American country music singer-songwriter Dennis Robbins. It was released on June 16, 1992 via Giant Records. The album includes the hit single "Home Sweet Home".

"Paris, Tennessee" was previously recorded by Tracy Lawrence on his 1991 debut album Sticks and Stones, and also by Kenny Chesney on his 1995 album All I Need to Know.

"I Am Just a Rebel" was previously recorded by Robbins when he and fellow songwriters, Bob DiPiero and John Scott Sherrill, formed the group Billy Hill on the 1989 album of the same name. It would later be recorded twice in 1994 by Confederate Railroad on their second album Notorious and by Joy Lynn White on her second album Wild Love.

== Critical reception ==
Billboard gave the album a "New & Noteworthy Review" calling it "Rebel-rousing, blue-collar country music in its finest form."

Robert Christgau gave the album an A− rating, comparing the work to John Anderson.

Brian Mansfield of AllMusic called it "Redneck rock that lives and dies by the slide guitar, think of Hank Williams Jr. with a sneakier sense of humor."

== Track listing ==
All tracks are written by Dennis Robbins, Bob DiPiero, and John Scott Sherrill, except as noted.

No.	Title	Writer(s)	Length
1.	"Home Sweet Home"		2:26
2.	"Paris, Tennessee"		2:24
3.	"Good News, Bad News"		2:53
4.	"My Side of Town"		3:28
5.	"I Am Just a Rebel"		3:57
6.	"Man with a Plan"	Robbins, Curtis Wright, Warren Haynes	3:08
7.	"Hi O Silver"		3:03
8.	"The Chapel of the Friendly Bells"		3:09
9.	"The Only Slide I Ever Played On"	Robbins, Dean Dillon	3:28
10.	"All the Way to San Antone"		4:11

== Personnel ==
- Jay Boy Adams – rhythm guitar (track 5)
- Bob Bailey – background vocals (track 10)
- Barry Beckett – piano, synthesizer
- Larry Byrom – acoustic guitar
- Glen Duncan – fiddle
- Vicki Hampton – background vocals (track 10)
- Dann Huff – electric guitar
- Jana King – background vocals (tracks 4, 10)
- Paul Leim – drums
- Donna McElroy – background vocals (track 10)
- Dennis Robbins – lead vocals, acoustic guitar, electric guitar, slide guitar
- Lisa Silver – background vocals (tracks 4, 10)
- James Stroud – drums
- Dennis Wilson – background vocals (tracks 4, 10)
- Glenn Worf – bass
- Curtis Wright – background vocals
- Curtis Young – background vocals
- Rusty Young – steel guitar
