= Pink Cadillac (film) =

1989 film by Buddy Van Horn

- Theatrical release poster
- Directed by: Buddy Van Horn
- Written by: John Eskow
- Produced by: David Valdes; Michael Gruskoff
- Starring: Clint Eastwood; Bernadette Peters
- Cinematography: Jack N. Green
- Edited by: Joel Cox
- Music by: Steve Dorff
- Production company: Malpaso Productions
- Distributed by: Warner Bros.
- Release date: May 26, 1989
- Running time: 122 minutes
- Country: United States
- Language: English
- Budget: $19 million
- Box office: $12.1 million

Pink Cadillac is a 1989 American action comedy film directed by Buddy Van Horn about a bounty hunter and a group of white supremacists chasing after an innocent woman who tries to outrun everyone in her husband's prized pink Cadillac. The film stars Clint Eastwood and Bernadette Peters, and also has small cameo appearances by Jim Carrey and Bryan Adams. Pink Cadillac is the final film directed by Van Horn, although he continued to work with Eastwood as stunt coordinator on several of his later films.

== Plot ==
A white supremacist group is chasing Lou Ann, whose husband, Roy, is a member. She has inadvertently taken counterfeit money from them by running away with his car (the pink Cadillac), which held the supremacists' stash.

Tommy Nowak is a skip-tracer whose speciality is dressing up in disguises, such as a rodeo clown, to fool whomever he is after. Tommy takes on the job of finding Lou Ann because she skipped bail.

When he finally finds her in Reno, Nevada, Tommy slowly becomes enamored. Roy and his gang kidnap her baby, whom Lou Ann has left with her sister, so Tommy decides to help Lou Ann get the baby back instead of turning her in. While driving through the West, seeking the baby, romance blossoms. They eventually fight the white supremacists and retrieve the baby.

== Cast ==
- Clint Eastwood as Tommy Nowak
- Bernadette Peters as Lou Ann McGuinn
- Timothy Carhart as Roy McGuinn
- John Dennis Johnston as Waycross
- Michael Des Barres as Alex
- Jimmie F. Skaggs as Bill Dunston
- Bill Moseley as Darrell
- Gerry Bamman as Buddy
- Michael Champion as Ken Lee
- William Hickey as Mr. Barton
- Geoffrey Lewis as Ricky Z
- Dirk Blocker as Policeman #1
- Frances Fisher as Dinah
- Paul Benjamin as Judge
- Bryan Adams as Gas Station Attendant
- Mara Corday as Stick Lady
- Jim Carrey as Lounge Entertainer
- James Cromwell as Motel Desk Clerk
- Bill McKinney as Coltersville Bartender

== Production ==
Filming began in late 1988, and took place in Utah, Nevada, and California. Parts filmed in Quincy, Crescent Mills, Chester’s west shore of Lake Almanor, all Plumas County in the state of California.

== Soundtrack ==
Pink Cadillac

Soundtrack album by various artists
- Released: May 23, 1989
- Genres: Country; Rock
- Length: 32:49
- Label: Warner Bros.
- Producer: Jim Ed Norman

The film's soundtrack features ten songs, all done by various country and rock artists. The album peaked at number 45 on the Billboard Top Country Albums in July 1989.

=== Track listing ===
No.	Title	Writer(s)	Artist	Length
1.	"Never Givin' Up on Love"	Micheal Smotherman	Michael Martin Murphey	3:48
2.	"There's a Tear in My Beer"	Hank Williams	Hank Williams Jr. and Hank Williams	2:48
3.	"If It Wasn't for the Heartache"	Chris Waters, Kix Brooks	Jill Hollier	2:38
4.	"Card Carryin' Fool"	Byron Hill, Tim Bays	Randy Travis	2:24
5.	"Any Way the Wind Blows"	John McFee, André Pessis	Southern Pacific	3:36
6.	"Reno Bound"	McFee, Pessis	Southern Pacific	3:07
7.	"Beneath the Texas Moon"	J.C. Crowley, Jack Wesley Routh	J.C. Crowley	3:45
8.	"Rollin' Dice"	Dennis Robbins, Bob DiPiero, John Scott Sherrill	Billy Hill	3:24
9.	"Drive All Night"	Dion DiMucci	Dion	3:00
10.	"Born Under a Bad Sign"	Booker T. Jones, William Bell	Robben Ford	3:41
Total length:				32:49

== Reception ==
The film received generally poor reviews. Roger Ebert gave it a1of a possible 4, saying "There's little that's new in the material, and nobody seems to have asked whether the emotional charge of blatant racism belongs in a lightweight story like this- even if the racists are villains." Caryn James wrote: "When it's time to look back on the strange sweep of Clint Eastwood's career, from his ambitious direction of Bird to his coarse, classic Dirty Harry character, Pink Cadillac will probably settle comfortably near the bottom of the list. It is the laziest sort of action comedy, with lumbering chase scenes, a dull-witted script and the charmless pairing of Mr. Eastwood and Bernadette Peters." (New York Times, May 26, 1989.)

Hal Hinson praised the performers: Peters "...plays her comic scenes with a vivacious abandon..." She "loosens him (Eastwood) up... and humanizes him. These two make a nifty comic team."

Pink Cadillac was released in May 1989, opening against Indiana Jones and the Last Crusade. The film eventually grossed $12,143,484. In contrast, the movie Eastwood made just prior to Pink Cadillac, the fifth Dirty Harry movie, The Dead Pool, grossed $37,903,295. Perhaps due to the poor reviews and meager box office, the film is, as of 2021, Eastwood's last action comedy.

It has a 24% rating on Rotten Tomatoes from 21 reviews with a mean of 3.7 of a possible 10. It also went direct to video in the United Kingdom, without a cinema release.

== Bibliography ==
- Hughes, Howard (2009). Aim for the Heart. London: I.B. Tauris. ISBN 978-1-84511-902-7.
