= I Am Just a Rebel =

Studio album by Billy Hill
- Released: 1989
- Genres: Country, country rock
- Label: Reprise
- Producer: Billy Hill

Singles from I Am Just a Rebel
- 1. "Too Much Month at the End of the Money" Released: June 1989; 2. "I Can't Help Myself (Sugar Pie Honey Bunch)" Released: November 1989; 3. "Nickel to My Name" Released: March 1990

I Am Just a Rebel is the debut studio album by American country music band Billy Hill. Released by Reprise Records in 1989, the album contains the hit song "Too Much Month at the End of the Money". It was the band's only album.

"Rollin' Dice" was originally recorded by lead singer Dennis Robbins in 1986 for his MCA Records album, The First of Me. It was also featured on the soundtrack to the film Pink Cadillac. Billy Hill's version of "I Can't Help Myself (Sugar Pie Honey Bunch)" made an appearance in the 1990 film My Blue Heaven.

== Critical reception ==
Professional ratings
Review scores
Source	Rating
AllMusic Guide to Country	4/5 stars
Chicago Tribune	3/4 stars

The Chicago Tribune deemed I Am Just a Rebel a "rollicking album," writing that "Billy Hill delivers heat, humor and heart." The Advocate wrote: "Imagine Levon Helm getting together with Little Feat to play some hillbilly music and you have some idea of what Billy Hill sounds like ... There's lots of hot playing, and the songs are good, too."

The Buffalo News concluded that Billy Hill "have a big, fun, 'bloozy' sound that is heavy on slide guitar, somewhat similar to the Rolling Stones' occasional forays into country." The Orange County Register stated that the "music is down and dirty, R&B-influenced barroom country rock with a ballad or two thrown in for good measure." USA Today listed I Am Just a Rebel as the 25th best country album of 1989.

== Track listing ==
All tracks are written by Bob DiPiero, Dennis Robbins, and John Scott Sherrill, except as noted.

No.	Title	Writer(s)	Length
1.	"Too Much Month at the End of the Money"		2:21
2.	"Nickel to My Name"		2:35
3.	"I Can't Help Myself (Sugar Pie Honey Bunch)"	Lamont Dozier, Brian Holland, Edward Holland, Jr.	3:34
4.	"These Lonely Blues"	Sherrill, DiPiero	4:03
5.	"Rollin' Dice"		3:26
6.	"What's a Boy to Do"		2:56
7.	"Just in Case You Want to Know"		3:31
8.	"I Am Just a Rebel"		3:32
9.	"Drive On By"		3:59
10.	"Gettin' On Down the Road"		3:33

== Personnel ==
Compiled from liner notes.

Billy Hill

- John Scott Sherrill — lead and backing vocals, acoustic and electric guitars
- Dennis Robbins — lead and backing vocals, acoustic and electric guitars, slide guitar
- Bob DiPiero — backing vocals, acoustic and electric guitars, Chet Atkins classical electric guitar
- Reno Kling — bass
- Martin Parker — drums, percussion

Additional musicians

- Bucky Baxter — steel guitar
- Barry Beckett — piano, Hammond B-3 organ
- Bessyl Duhon — accordion
- Glen Duncan — fiddle, mandolin

== Chart performance ==
Chart (1989)	Peak position
U.S. Top Country Albums (Billboard)	55
