= Liberty Township, Trumbull County, Ohio =

Township in Ohio, US

Liberty Township, Ohio
- Township
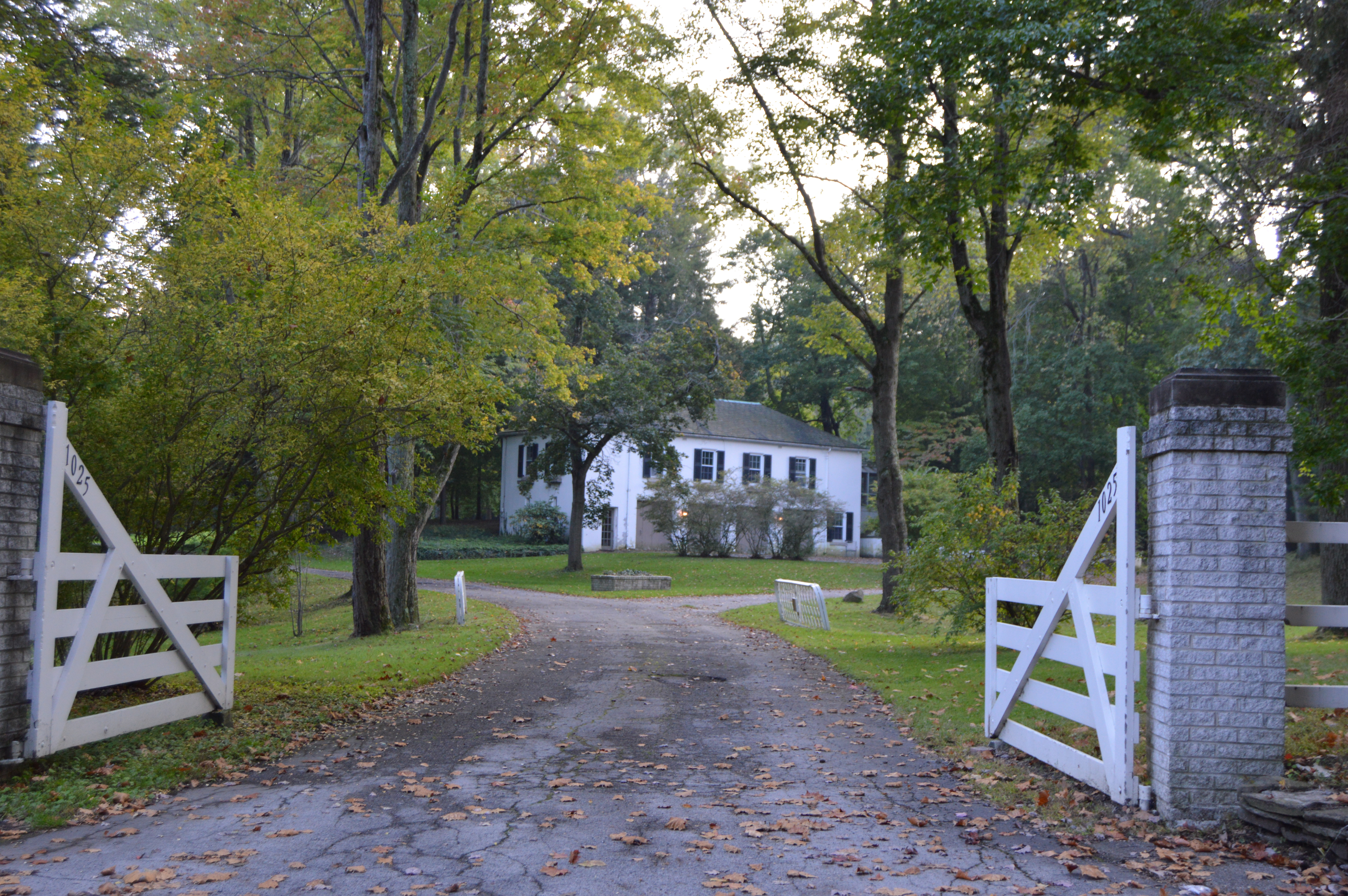
- Richard Garlick House north of Youngstown
- Motto: "Preserving Our Heritage...Planning Our Future!"
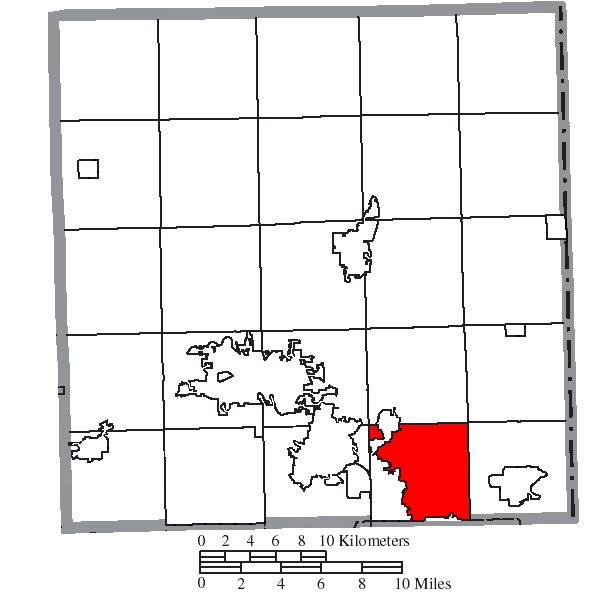
- Location of Liberty Township in Trumbull County
- Coordinates: 41°9′25″N 80°40′40″W
- Country: United States
- State: Ohio
- County: Trumbull

Area
  - Total: 23.1 sq mi (59.9 km^{2})
  - Land: 22.7 sq mi (58.9 km^{2})
  - Water: 0.39 sq mi (1.0 km^{2})
- Elevation: 1,030 ft (314 m)

Population (2020)
  - Total: 21,514
  - Density: 946/sq mi (365.3/km^{2})
- Time zone: UTC-5 (Eastern (EST))
  - Summer (DST): UTC-4 (EDT)
- FIPS code: 39-43344
- GNIS feature ID: 1087037
- Website: https://libertytwp.com/

Liberty Township is one of the twenty-four townships of Trumbull County, Ohio, United States. The 2020 census found 21,514 people within the geographical area of the township.

== History ==
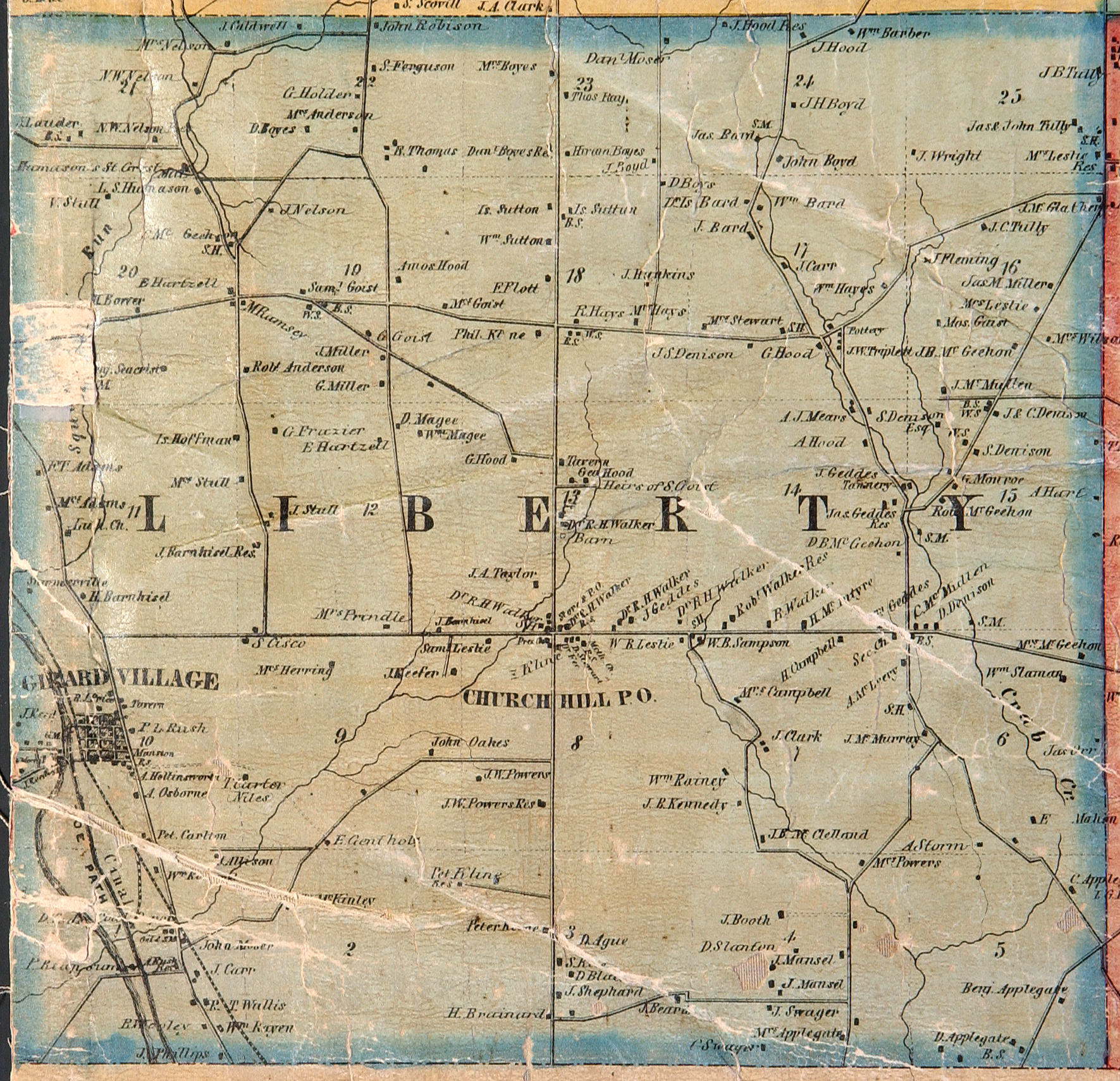
1856 map of Liberty Township, Trumbull County, Ohio

It is one of twenty-five Liberty Townships statewide.

Liberty Township was formed from the Connecticut Western Reserve. It was established as a township in 1806. The first settler in the township was thought to be Henry Swager in 1798. Four villages grew within its borders: Girard, Churchill, Sodom, and Seceders Corners. In 1860, coal was discovered on Alexander McCleery's farm becoming a major industry in the area for the next forty years.

== Geography ==
Located at 41°9′25″N 80°40′40″W (41.156944, -80.677778) in the southeastern part of Trumbull County, Liberty Township borders the following townships, city, and village:

- Vienna Township, Trumbull County on the north
- Brookfield Township, Trumbull County on the northeast corner
- Hubbard Township, Trumbull County on the east
- Youngstown on the south
- Austintown Township, Mahoning County on the southwest corner
- Weathersfield Township, Trumbull County on the west
- Howland Township, Trumbull County on the northwest corner
- McDonald on the west

Liberty Township is one of two urban townships in Trumbull County, along with Howland Township. It is located on the southern edge of the county.

Most of the city of Girard is located in western Liberty Township, and the census-designated place of Churchill is located in the township's center.

== Demographics ==
According to the 2010 Census numbers, Liberty Township (the unincorporated areas, excluding the city of Girard) had 5,029 households and 3,337 families.

The racial makeup of the unincorporated areas of the township was roughly 78.4% White, 17.7% Black or African American, 1.0% Asian, 0.26% American Indian or Alaska Native, 2.2% of two or more races. 2.2% identify themselves as Hispanic or Latino of any race.

Records suggest that in the township (excluding Girard), 26.1% of the households had children under the age of 18. Of households with children under the age of 18, 59.8% were married couples living together, 30.1% had a female householder with no husband present, and 2.1% were non-families. Meanwhile, 28.1% of all households comprise a single person, and 12.3% of households comprised a person over 65 years of age living alone. For every 100 females, there were 92.7 males. The median age was 46 years. The average household size was 2.35 and the average family size was 2.86.

== Government ==
The township is governed by a three-member board of trustees, who are elected in November of odd-numbered years to a four-year term beginning on the following January 1. Two are elected in the year after the presidential election and one is elected in the year before it. There is also an elected township fiscal officer, who serves a four-year term beginning on April 1 of the year after the election, which is held in November of the year before the presidential election. Vacancies in the fiscal officership or on the board of trustees are filled by the remaining trustees.

== Education ==
Public education in the township (excluding the city of Girard) is managed by the Liberty Local Schools. The school district mascot is the leopard. The Liberty Township school district comprises three schools:

- E. J. Blott Elementary School
- William S. Guy Middle School
- Liberty High School

Average district daily enrollment during the 2010–2011 school year was 1427 pupils. 59.2% of pupils were white (non-Hispanic), 31.7% were black (non-Hispanic), 2.9% were Hispanic, and 5.3% were multiracial. 60.2% of pupils come from economically disadvantaged households. 12.2% of pupils were students with disabilities.

== Transportation ==
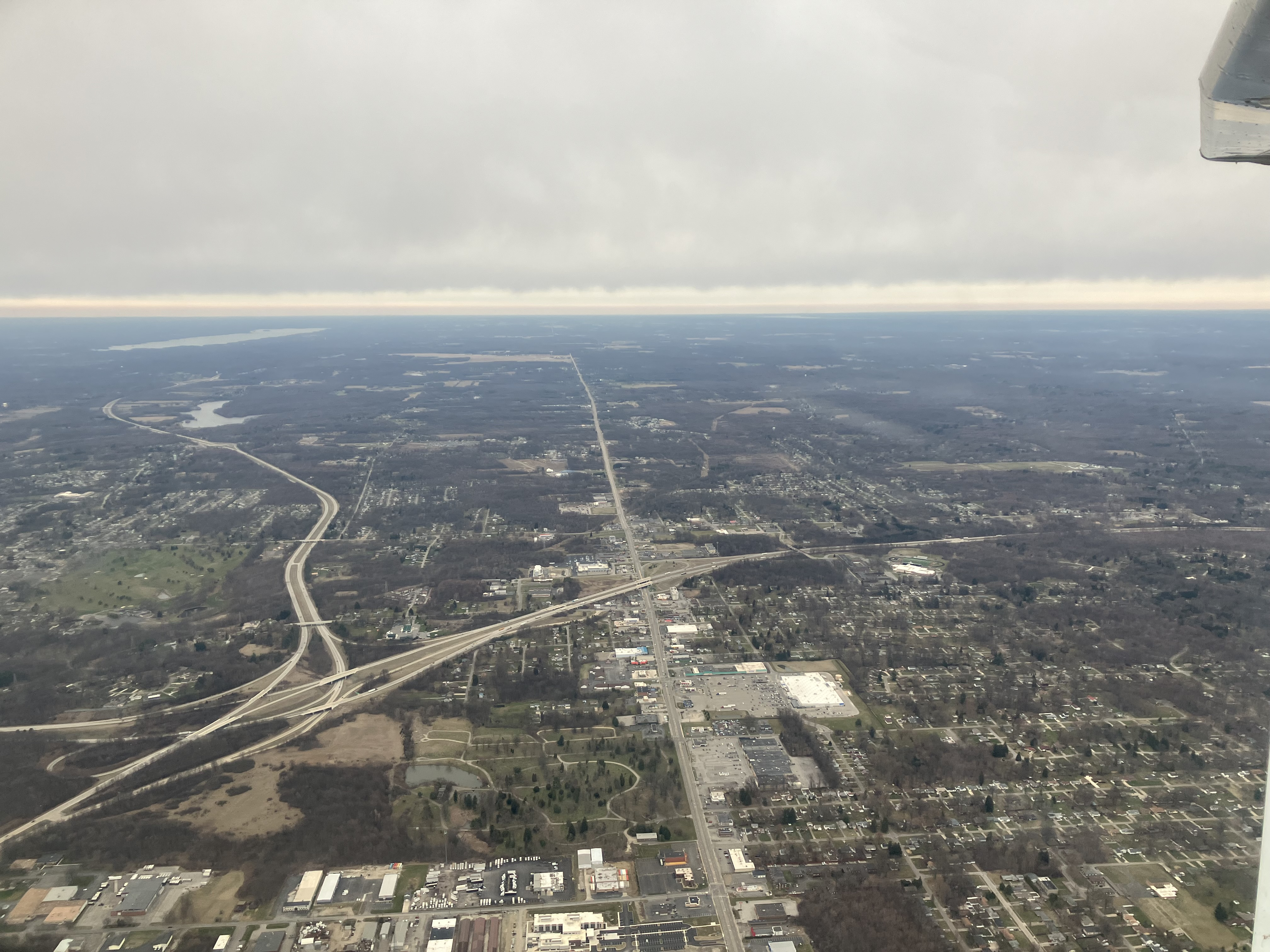
Aerial image taken 3000ft above the ground, with Belmont Avenue goes through the middle, Interstate 80 running bottom left to right, and State Route 11 running to top left

State Route 193 is a significant transportation artery in Liberty Township.

== Notable people ==
- Amy Acton, former director of the Ohio Department of Health of Ohio during the COVID-19 pandemic
- Marc Dann, former attorney general of Ohio
- John Q. Emery, Wisconsin Superintendent of Public Instruction
- Bradley Fletcher, former NFL cornerback
- Jerry DePizzo, saxophonist and guitaristist
- Bob DiPiero, songwriter
- Dave Malkoff - CBS News National Correspondent
- David C. Smith (author), author of fantasy, horror, and suspense fiction, medical editor, and essayist
- Fitzgerald Toussaint, former NFL running back

== See also ==
- Youngstown, Ohio is the main metropolitan area bordering Liberty Township.
