= My Side of Town (Dennis Robbins song) =

Single by Dennis Robbins

from the album Man with a Plan
- B-side: "Hi O Silver"
- Released: August 17, 1992
- Genre: Country
- Length: 3:28
- Label: Giant
- Songwriter(s): Dennis Robbins; Bob DiPiero; John Scott Sherrill
- Producer(s): Richard Landis; James Stroud

Dennis Robbins singles chronology
"Home Sweet Home" (1992)	"My Side of Town" (1992)	"Good News, Bad News" (1992)

"My Side of Town" is a song co-written and recorded by American country music singer-songwriter Dennis Robbins. It was released as the second single off of his 1992 album Man with a Plan. The song peaked at No. 59 on the Billboard Hot Country Singles & Tracks chart.

== Content ==
The lyrics of the song portray a lonely man who wonders about his former lover and where she is.

== Critical reception ==
A review on Billboard gave the song a "Critic's Choice" review, calling it "a number that begs to be loved from its vocals to the musicianship and production."

== Chart performance ==
Chart (1992)	Peak position
US Hot Country Songs (Billboard)	59
