= Born Ready =

Studio album by Dennis Robbins
- Released: July 19, 1994
- Genre: Country
- Length: 33:34
- Label: Giant
- Producer: Richard Landis, Dennis Robbins (tracks 1–8, 10); James Stroud (tracks 1–10); Lynn Peterzell (track 9)

Dennis Robbins chronology
Man with a Plan (1992)	Born Ready (1994)

Singles from Born Ready
- 1. "Looking for a Thing Called Love" Released: July 1993; 2. "Mona Lisa on Cruise Control" Released: November 1993; 3. "Travelin' Music" Released: May 1994

Born Ready is the third solo studio album by American country music singer-songwriter Dennis Robbins. It was released on July 19, 1994, via Giant Records. This was the most recent album released by Dennis Robbins.

"Blowin' Smoke" was previously recorded by David Ball (one of its co-writers) on his 1994 album Thinkin' Problem.

"Looking for a Thing Called Love" was featured on the soundtrack The Thing Called Love from the 1993 movie of the same name.

== Critical reception ==
The Beaver County Times gave the album a review stating "Dennis Robbins doesn't trade in the most original subject matter."

Ken Rosenbaum of The Blade of Toledo, Ohio, gave the album a review calling Dennis Robbins "more of a honky-tonker with a western feel of pedal steel".

== Track listing ==
No.	Title	Writer(s)	Length
1.	"Mona Lisa on Cruise Control"	Dennis Robbins, Michael Dan Ehmig, John Scott Sherrill	2:49
2.	"Travelin' Music"	Robbins, Troy Seals, J.P. Pennington	2:57
3.	"Born Ready"	Robbins, Bob DiPiero, John Scott Sherrill	3:10
4.	"Wild Rebel Love"	Robbins, Seals, Pennington	3:47
5.	"Where There's a Wheel There's a Way"	Robbins, DiPiero, Sherrill	3:20
6.	"Ride Ride Ride"	Robbins, Ehmig, Seals	4:26
7.	"Blowin' Smoke"	Billy Spencer, David Ball, Tommy Polk	2:52
8.	"Before We Reach the Crossroads"	Robbins, Ehmig, Seals	4:19
9.	"Looking for a Thing Called Love"	Robbins, Seals	2:55
10.	"Walkin' on the Edge"	Robbins, Ehmig	2:59

== Personnel ==
- Larry Byrom – acoustic guitar
- Glenn Duncan – mandolin
- Sonny Garrish – steel guitar
- Dann Huff – electric guitar, 12-string
- Jana King – background vocals
- Terry McMillan – harmonica
- Steve Nathan – synthesizer
- Donna Rhoades – background vocals
- Cindy Richardson-Walker – background vocals
- Dennis Robbins – lead vocals, acoustic guitar, electric guitar, slide guitar
- Matt Rollings – piano
- Lonnie Wilson – drums
- Glenn Worf – bass
- Curtis Wright – background vocals
- Curtis Young – background vocals

=== Personnel on "Looking for a Thing Called Love" ===
- Eddie Bayers – drums
- Larry Byrom – acoustic guitar
- Paul Franklin – steel guitar
- Steve Nathan – synthesizer
- Dennis Robbins – lead vocals, acoustic guitar, electric guitar, slide guitar
- Leland Skylar – bass
- Michael Thompson – electric guitar
- Curtis Wright – background vocals
- Curtis Young – background vocals
