= Thing About You =

Single by Southern Pacific with Emmylou Harris

from the album Southern Pacific
- B-side: "Reno Bound"
- Released: August 3, 1985
- Genre: Country, country rock
- Length: 3:52
- Label: Warner Bros.
- Songwriter(s): Tom Petty
- Producer(s): Jim Ed Norman, Southern Pacific

Southern Pacific singles chronology
"Someone's Gonna Love Me Tonight" (1985)	"Thing About You" (1985)	"Perfect Stranger" (1985)

Emmylou Harris singles chronology
"White Line" (1985)	"Thing About You" (1985)	"Rhythm Guitar" (1985)

"Thing About You" is a song written by Tom Petty, and recorded by American rock music group Tom Petty and the Heartbreakers for their 1980 album Hard Promises. In 1985, it was covered by American country music group Southern Pacific, featuring Emmylou Harris, and was released in August 1985 as the second single from the band's self-titled debut album. The song reached number 14 on the Billboard Hot Country Singles & Tracks chart.

== Chart performance ==
Chart (1985)	Peak position
US Hot Country Songs (Billboard)	14
Canadian RPM Country Tracks	14
