= Mona Lisa on Cruise Control =

1993 Dennis Robbins song

Single by Dennis Robbins

from the album Born Ready
- B-side: "Walkin' on The Edge"
- Released: November 1993
- Genre: Country
- Length: 2:49
- Label: Giant
- Songwriters: Dennis Robbins; Michael Dan Ehmig; John Scott Sherrill
- Producers: Richard Landis; James Stroud

Dennis Robbins singles chronology
"Looking for a Thing Called Love" (1993)	"Mona Lisa on Cruise Control" (1993)	"Travelin' Music" (1994)

"Mona Lisa on Cruise Control" is a song co-written and recorded by American country music singer-songwriter Dennis Robbins. It was released as the second single to his 1994 album Born Ready. This song is Robbins' last charting single to date, peaking at No. 68 on the Billboard Hot Country Singles & Tracks chart.

== Critical reception ==
A review on Billboard stated that "whenever Robbins and former Billy Hill band mate John Scott Sherrill get together to write, wonderful things happen."

== Music video ==
The music video, directed by Marc Ball, features Robbins singing and playing his guitar while a young woman (who is portraying as Mona Lisa) is seen dancing, blowing bubbles, letting go of a balloon, and riding in a car. The ending of the video shows a picture of the Mona Lisa in the back seat of a moving car. The video was filmed in the town of Mesilla, New Mexico.

== Chart performance ==
Chart (1993–1994)	Peak position
US Hot Country Songs (Billboard)	68
