= Home Sweet Home (Dennis Robbins song) =

Single by Dennis Robbins

from the album Man with a Plan
- B-side: "The Only Slide I Ever Played On"
- Released: April 1992
- Genre: Country
- Length: 2:26
- Label: Giant
- Songwriters: Dennis Robbins; Bob DiPiero; John Scott Sherrill
- Producers: Richard Landis; James Stroud

Dennis Robbins singles chronology
"Two of a Kind (Workin' on a Full House)" (1987)	"Home Sweet Home" (1992)	"My Side of Town" (1992)

"Home Sweet Home" is a song co-written and recorded by American country music singer-songwriter Dennis Robbins, his first solo single release since 1987. It was released in April 1992 as the lead single from his second studio album Man with a Plan. It was also Robbins' only solo Top 40 hit, peaking at No. 34 on the Billboard Hot Country Singles & Tracks chart. Robbins wrote the song, along with Bob DiPiero and John Scott Sherrill.

== Critical reception ==
A review on Billboard gave the song a "New & Noteworthy" review, stating that "Robbins snaps listeners to attention with a convincing country vocal that is etched with a bluesy quality."

== Chart performance ==
Chart (1992)	Peak position
US Hot Country Songs (Billboard)	34
Canadian RPM Country Tracks	73
