= County Line (Southern Pacific album) =

Studio album by Southern Pacific
- Released: January 5, 1990
- Recorded: 1989
- Studio: Lizard Rock Studio (Solvang, California); Ocean Way Recording (Hollywood, California); Digital Recorders and The Loft (Nashville, Tennessee)
- Genre: Country
- Length: 37:56
- Label: Warner Bros.
- Producer: Southern Pacific; Jim Ed Norman

Southern Pacific chronology
Zuma (1988)	County Line (1990)	Greatest Hits (1991)

Singles from County Line
- 1. "Time's Up" Released: December 2, 1989; 2. "I Go to Pieces" Released: April 1990; 3. "Reckless Heart" Released: August 1990; 4. "Memphis Queen" Released: December 1990

County Line is the fourth and final studio album by American country music group Southern Pacific. It was released in 1990 via Warner Bros. Records. The album includes the singles "Any Way the Wind Blows", "Time's Up" "I Go to Pieces" and "Reckless Heart". The album featured a guest appearance from the Beach Boys on backing vocals on "GTO."

== Track listing ==
No.	Title	Writer(s)	Length
1.	"Any Way the Wind Blows"	John McFee, Andre Pessis	3:37
2.	"I Can't Complain"	Kurt Howell, McFee	2:21
3.	"Beyond Love"	McFee, Keith Knudsen	3:24
4.	"Time's Up" (with Carlene Carter)	Kevin Welch, Wendy Waldman, Harry Stinson	3:21
5.	"Memphis Queen"	Howell, McFee	3:18
6.	"Side Saddle"	Howell, Stu Cook	3:45
7.	"One That Got Away"	McFee, Pessis	3:06
8.	"Reckless Heart"	McFee, Pessis	3:35
9.	"Mary Lou"	Obie Jessie, Sam Ling	2:28
10.	"Help Wanted"	Cook, Howell	3:28
11.	"GTO"	John Buck Wilkin	2:49
12.	"I Go to Pieces"	Del Shannon	2:34

== Personnel ==
Southern Pacific

- Kurt Howell – keyboards, vocals, lead vocals (1–3, 5–7, 10, 11)
- John McFee – guitars, steel guitar, banjo, dobro, mandolin, fiddle, harmonica, vocals, lead vocals (1–5, 7, 9, 11, 12)
- Stu Cook – bass, vocals
- Keith Knudsen – drums, percussion, vocals

Guest musicians

- David Humphreys – Fairlight programming (6)
- Craig Krampf – percussion programming (6)
- Jim Horn – saxophone (6)
- The Snapping Turtles – finger popping
- Carlene Carter – lead vocals (4)
- The Beach Boys – lead vocals (11)

Production

- Doug Grau – A&R direction
- Southern Pacific – producers, arrangements
- Jim Ed Norman – producer, arrangements
- Mark Ettel – recording
- Chris Hammond – recording
- Csaba Pectoz – recording
- Lee Groitzsch – additional recording
- Steve Holroyd – recording assistant
- John Hurley – recording assistant
- Clif Norrell – recording assistant
- Michael C. Ross – recording assistant
- Scott Hendricks – mixing at The Castle (Franklin, Tennessee)
- Mark Nevers – mix assistant
- Mike McKnight – MIDI technician
- Denny Purcell – mastering at Georgetown Masters (Nashville, Tennessee)
- Danny Kee – production assistant
- Laura LiPuma – art direction, design
- Glenn Parsons – design, logo design
- Jeff Katz – photography

== Chart performance ==
Chart (1990)	Peak position
US Top Country Albums (Billboard)	42
