= Southern Pacific (album) =

Studio album by Southern Pacific
- Released: 1985
- Studio: Lizard Rock Studio (Solvang, California); One On One Studios (North Hollywood, California); Sound Stage Studios (Nashville, Tennessee)
- Genre: Country
- Length: 38:29
- Label: Warner Bros.
- Producer: Jim Ed Norman; Southern Pacific

Southern Pacific chronology
Southern Pacific (1985)	Killbilly Hill (1986)

Singles from Southern Pacific
- 1. "Someone's Gonna Love Me Tonight" Released: April 1985; 2. "Thing About You" Released: August 3, 1985; 3. "Perfect Stranger" Released: November 16, 1985; 4. "Reno Bound" Released: April 19, 1986

Southern Pacific is the debut studio album by American country music group Southern Pacific. It was released in 1985 via Warner Bros. Records. The album includes the singles "Someone's Gonna Love Me Tonight", "Thing About You", "Perfect Stranger" and "Reno Bound".

== Track listing ==
No.	Title	Writer(s)	Length
1.	"First One to Go"	Chuck Pyle	3:32
2.	"Someone's Gonna Love Me Tonight"	Bruce Gowdy, Tim Goodman	3:36
3.	"Thing About You"	Tom Petty	3:50
4.	"Perfect Stranger"	Goodman, John McFee	4:06
5.	"Send Me Somebody to Love"	Tim Krekel	3:23
6.	"Reno Bound"	McFee, Andre Pessis	3:23
7.	"The Blaster"	Goodman, McFee, Keith Knudsen, Glen Hardin, Jerry Scheff	4:47
8.	"Luanne"	Lou Gramm, Mick Jones	3:18
9.	"Bluebird Wine"	Rodney Crowell	3:55
10.	"Heroes"	Jennifer Kimball, Tom Kimmel	4:25

== Personnel ==
Southern Pacific

- Tim Goodman – lead vocals, backing vocals, synthesizers, acoustic guitars
- Glen Hardin – acoustic piano, electric piano, synthesizers, backing vocals
- John McFee – electric guitars, pedal steel guitar, dobro, violin, backing vocals
- Jerry Scheff – electric bass, electric upright bass, backing vocals
- Keith Knudsen – drums, percussion, backing vocals

Additional musicians

- Rhett Lawrence – synthesizers (5), Fairlight programming (5)
- Jim Ed Norman – cymbal crashes (4)
- Emmylou Harris – lead vocals (3)

Production

- Southern Pacific – producers
- Jim Ed Norman – producer
- Bradley Hartman – co-producer, recording
- John McFee – recording
- Eric Prestidge – mixing, mastering
- Lee Groitzsch – mix assistant
- Glenn Meadows – mastering
- Masterfonics (Nashville, Tennessee) – mastering location
- Gabrielle Raumberger – art direction, design
- Lori Lohstoeter – illustration

== Chart performance ==
Chart (1985)	Peak position
US Top Country Albums (Billboard)	25
