= Any Way the Wind Blows (Southern Pacific song) =

Single by Southern Pacific

from the album County Line / Pink Cadillac (soundtrack)
- B-side: "Reno Bound"
- Released: June 1989
- Genre: Country
- Length: 3:38
- Label: Warner Bros.
- Songwriters: John McFee, Andre Pessis
- Producers: Southern Pacific, Jim Ed Norman

Southern Pacific singles chronology
"All is Lost" (1989)	"Any Way the Wind Blows" (1989)	"Time's Up" (1990)

"Any Way the Wind Blows" is a song written by John McFee and Andre Pessis, and recorded by American country music group Southern Pacific. It was released in June 1989 as the first single from the album County Line. The song reached No. 4 on the Billboard Hot Country Singles & Tracks chart. It was featured in the 1989 movie Pink Cadillac.

== Personnel ==
- Keith Knudsen – drums, background vocals
- John McFee – lead vocals, lead guitar
- Stu Cook – bass guitar, background vocals
- Kurt Howell – synthesizer, lead vocals, background vocals

== Chart performance ==
Chart (1989)	Peak position
Canada Country Singles (RPM)	5
US Hot Country Songs (Billboard)	4

=== Year-end charts ===
Chart (1989)	Position
Canada Country Tracks (RPM)	72
US Country Songs (Billboard)	65
