= Southern Pacific (band) =

American country rock band (1983–1991)

- Southern Pacific (left to right: Knudsen, Cook, McFee, Howell), 1989.

Background information
- Origin: San Francisco, California, United States
- Genre: Country rock
- Years active: 1983–1991
- Labels: Warner Bros., Wounded Bird
- Spinoffs: Burnin' Daylight
- Spinoff of: TCB Band; The Doobie Brothers; Pablo Cruise
- Past members: Keith Knudsen; John McFee; Jerry Scheff; Tim Goodman; Glen Hardin; Stu Cook; Kurt Howell; David Jenkins

Southern Pacific was an American country rock band which existed from 1983 to 1991. It are best known for hits such as "Any Way the Wind Blows" (1989), which was used in the soundtrack for the film Pink Cadillac starring Clint Eastwood and Bernadette Peters, and "New Shade of Blue" (1988, its highest-ranking single on the country charts in November of that year). Southern Pacific was named New Country Group of the Year when it debuted and has been honored by having its name added to the Country Music Association's Walkway of Stars in Nashville, Tennessee.

== History ==
The band was formed in 1983 with former Doobie Brothers members Keith Knudsen and John McFee and bassist Jerry Scheff. Additional founding members include Tim Goodman on vocals and keyboardist Glen Hardin. The group signed with Warner Bros. Records in 1984 through which their debut album, Southern Pacific was released the following year. Scheff left after the album debuted and was replaced by Stu Cook of Creedence Clearwater Revival, while Kurt Howell replaced Hardin on keyboards. Cook and Howell would join the others in the release of Killbilly Hill in 1986. This album would feature the cover of Bruce Springsteen's "Pink Cadillac". Goodman left after the second album to pursue a solo career and was replaced by David Jenkins (formerly of Pablo Cruise) in 1987 in time for the production of the group's third album Zuma (1988) where their highest ranking single "New Shade of Blue" was included. Jenkins left after Zuma and the group remained a quartet for the final album County Line (1990) which included the single "Any Way The Wind Blows" that was used in the Pink Cadillac soundtrack and film that same year. County Line also featured a guest appearance from The Beach Boys on backing vocals on a cover of "GTO" by the Beach Boys' contemporaries Ronny & the Daytonas. Southern Pacific covered the Roky Erickson song "It's a Cold Night For Alligators" for the tribute album Where the Pyramid Meets the Eye: A Tribute to Roky Erickson. (Cook had produced more than a dozen of Erickson's songs in 1979, which became Erickson's album The Evil One.) The group disbanded and Warner Bros. released their Greatest Hits album in 1991.

After Southern Pacific's breakup, Knudsen and McFee and Cook formed the super group, Jackdawg, and recorded one album. Subsequently both McFee and Knudsen returned to The Doobie Brothers (who had already reunited in 1987). Knudsen died in 2005 while McFee continues to tour with The Doobies. Cook toured with fellow Creedence Clearwater Revival band member Doug Clifford with the group Cosmo's Factory (now Creedence Clearwater Revisited). Goodman continued to tour and record with The Magic Music Band and his solo project, The Tim Goodman Band. Howell formed his own music group, called Burnin' Daylight. This group also included former Exile member Sonny LeMaire and Nashville songwriter Marc Beeson.

Southern Pacific's four studio albums were reissued in 2003 by specialty label Wounded Bird Records in two double-CD packages.

Cook was inducted into the Rock and Roll Hall of Fame with Creedence Clearwater Revival in 1993. Both Knudsen (posthumous) and McFee were inducted with the Doobie Brothers in 2020.

== Band members ==
Final lineup

- Keith Knudsen – drums, percussion, backing vocals (1983–1991)
- John McFee – lead guitar, steel guitar, mandolin, banjo, fiddle, resonator guitar, electric sitar, harmonica, lead and backing vocals (1983–1991)
- Stu Cook – bass, backing vocals (1986–1991)
- Kurt Howell – piano, synthesizer, lead and backing vocals (1986–1991)

Former members

- Tim Goodman – lead vocals, rhythm guitar, synthesizer (1983–1986)
- Glen D. Hardin – piano, synthesizer, backing vocals (1983–1986)
- Jerry Scheff – bass, backing vocals (1983–1986)
- David Jenkins – rhythm guitar, lead and backing vocals (1987–1989)

== Discography ==
=== Studio albums ===
Title	Album details	Peak positions
Title	Album details	US Country
Southern Pacific	Release date: 1985; Label: Warner Bros. Records	25
Killbilly Hill	Release date: November 1986; Label: Warner Bros. Records	35
Zuma	Release date: June 21, 1988; Label: Warner Bros. Records	27
County Line	Release date: January 5, 1990; Label: Warner Bros. Records	42

=== Compilation albums ===
Title	Album details
Greatest Hits	Release date: July 9, 1991; Label: Warner Bros. Records
Rhino Hi-Five: Southern Pacific	Release date: 2007; Label: Rhino Entertainment

=== Singles ===
Year	Single	Peak positions			Album
Year	Single	US Country	US AC	CAN Country	Album
1985	"Someone's Gonna Love Me Tonight"	60	—	40	Southern Pacific
1985	"Thing About You" (with Emmylou Harris)	14	—	14	Southern Pacific
1985	"Perfect Stranger"	18	—	24	Southern Pacific
1986	"Reno Bound"	9	—	19	Southern Pacific
1986	"A Girl Like Emmylou"	17	—	19	Killbilly Hill
1986	"Killbilly Hill"	37	—	20	Killbilly Hill
1987	"Don't Let Go of My Heart"	26	—	27	Killbilly Hill
1988	"Midnight Highway"	14	—	16	Zuma
1988	"New Shade of Blue"	2	—	1	Zuma
1988	"Honey I Dare You"	5	—	3	Zuma
1989	"All Is Lost"	—	19	—	Zuma
1989	"Any Way the Wind Blows"	4	—	5	Pink Cadillac (soundtrack) / County Line
1989	"Time's Up" (with Carlene Carter)	26	—	19	County Line
1990	"I Go to Pieces"	31	—	17	County Line
1990	"Reckless Heart"	32	—	23	County Line
1990	"Memphis Queen"	—	—	—	County Line
"—" denotes releases that did not chart

=== Music videos ===
Year	Video	Director
1986	"Killbilly Hill"	Ethan Russell
1989	"Any Way the Wind Blows"	—N/a
1990	"I Go to Pieces"	Gerry Wenner

=== Album appearances ===
Year	Song	Album
1987	"Shoot for the Top"	Police Academy 4: Citizens on Patrol
1990	"It's a Cold Night For Alligators"	Where the Pyramid Meets the Eye: A Tribute to Roky Erickson
