= Killbilly Hill (album) =

Studio album by Southern Pacific
- Released: November 1986
- Studio: Lizard Rock Studio (Solvang, California); The Loft (Nashville, Tennessee)
- Genre: Country
- Length: 37:07
- Label: Warner Bros.
- Producer: Southern Pacific; Jim Ed Norman

Southern Pacific chronology
Southern Pacific (1985)	Killbilly Hill (1986)	Zuma (1988)

Singles from Killbilly Hill
- 1. "A Girl Like Emmylou" Released: August 9, 1986; 2. "Killbilly Hill" Released: December 6, 1986; 3. "Don't Let Go of My Heart" Released: March 21, 1987

Killbilly Hill is the second studio album by American country music group Southern Pacific. It was released in 1986 via Warner Bros. Records. The album includes the singles "A Girl Like Emmylou", "Killbilly Hill" and "Don't Let Go of My Heart".

== Track listing ==
No.	Title	Writer(s)	Length
1.	"Road Song"	Tim Goodman, Stu Cook, Kurt Howell, Keith Knudsen, John McFee	3:38
2.	"A Girl Like Emmylou"	Goodman, Cook, Knudsen, McFee	3:36
3.	"Pink Cadillac"	Bruce Springsteen	4:53
4.	"I Still Look for You"	Carl Struck, Michael Noble	3:00
5.	"Pull Your Hat Down Tight"	Lewis Storey	3:06
6.	"Killbilly Hill"	Goodman, McFee	3:07
7.	"Don't Let Go of My Heart"	Howell, Harry Maslin	4:12
8.	"What's It Gonna Take"	Cook, Howell, Knudsen, McFee	3:18
9.	"Hearts on the Borderline"	Pat Bunch, Pam Rose, Mary Ann Kennedy	3:39
10.	"Bluegrass Blues"	Jamie O'Hara, Kieran Kane	3:50

== Personnel ==
Southern Pacific

- Kurt Howell – keyboards, vocals, lead vocals (7)
- Tim Goodman – acoustic guitar, electric guitar, vocals, lead vocals (1–4, 8–10)
- John McFee – acoustic guitar, electric guitar, banjo, dobro, electric sitar, mandolin, pedal steel guitar, violin, vocals, lead vocals (5, 6)
- Stu Cook – bass, vocals
- Keith Knudsen – drums, percussion, vocals, lead vocals (1)

Production

- Southern Pacific – producers, arrangements
- Jim Ed Norman – producer, arrangements
- Chris Hinshaw – recording
- John McFee – recording
- Eric Prestidge – mixing, mastering
- Lee Groitzsch – mix assistant
- Denny Purcell – mastering
- Georgetown Masters (Nashville, Tennessee) – mastering location
- Gabrielle Raumberger – art direction, design
- Lori Lohstoeter – illustration
- Randee St. Nicholas – back cover photography
- Scott Bonner – dust sleeve photography

== Chart performance ==
Chart (1986)	Peak position
US Top Country Albums (Billboard)	35
