= Killbilly Hill =

Single by Southern Pacific

from the album Killbilly Hill
- B-side: "Bluegrass Blues"
- Released: December 6, 1986
- Genre: Country
- Length: 3:11
- Label: Warner Bros.
- Songwriter(s): Tim Goodman, John McFee
- Producer(s): Southern Pacific, Jim Ed Norman

Southern Pacific singles chronology
"A Girl Like Emmylou" (1986)	"Killbilly Hill" (1986)	"Don't Let Go of My Heart" (1987)

"Killbilly Hill" is a song written by Tim Goodman and John McFee, and recorded by American country music group Southern Pacific. It was released in December 1986 as the second single and title track from the album Killbilly Hill. The song reached number 37 on the Billboard Hot Country Singles & Tracks chart.

== Chart performance ==
Chart (1986–1987)	Peak position
US Hot Country Songs (Billboard)	37
Canadian RPM Country Tracks	20
