= A Girl Like Emmylou =

Single by Southern Pacific

from the album Killbilly Hill
- B-side: "Hearts on the Borderline"
- Released: August 9, 1986
- Genre: Country
- Length: 3:41
- Label: Warner Bros.
- Songwriter(s): Tim Goodman; John McFee; Stu Cook; Keith Knudsen
- Producer(s): Southern Pacific, Jim Ed Norman

Southern Pacific singles chronology
"Reno Bound" (1986)	"A Girl Like Emmylou" (1986)	"Killbilly Hill" (1986)

"A Girl Like Emmylou" is a song recorded by American country music group Southern Pacific. It was released in August 1986 as the first single from the album Killbilly Hill. The song reached number 17 on the Billboard Hot Country Singles & Tracks chart. It was written by group members Tim Goodman, John McFee, Stu Cook and Keith Knudsen.

== Chart performance ==
Chart (1986)	Peak position
US Hot Country Songs (Billboard)	17
Canadian RPM Country Tracks	19
