= Dave Malkoff =

American journalist

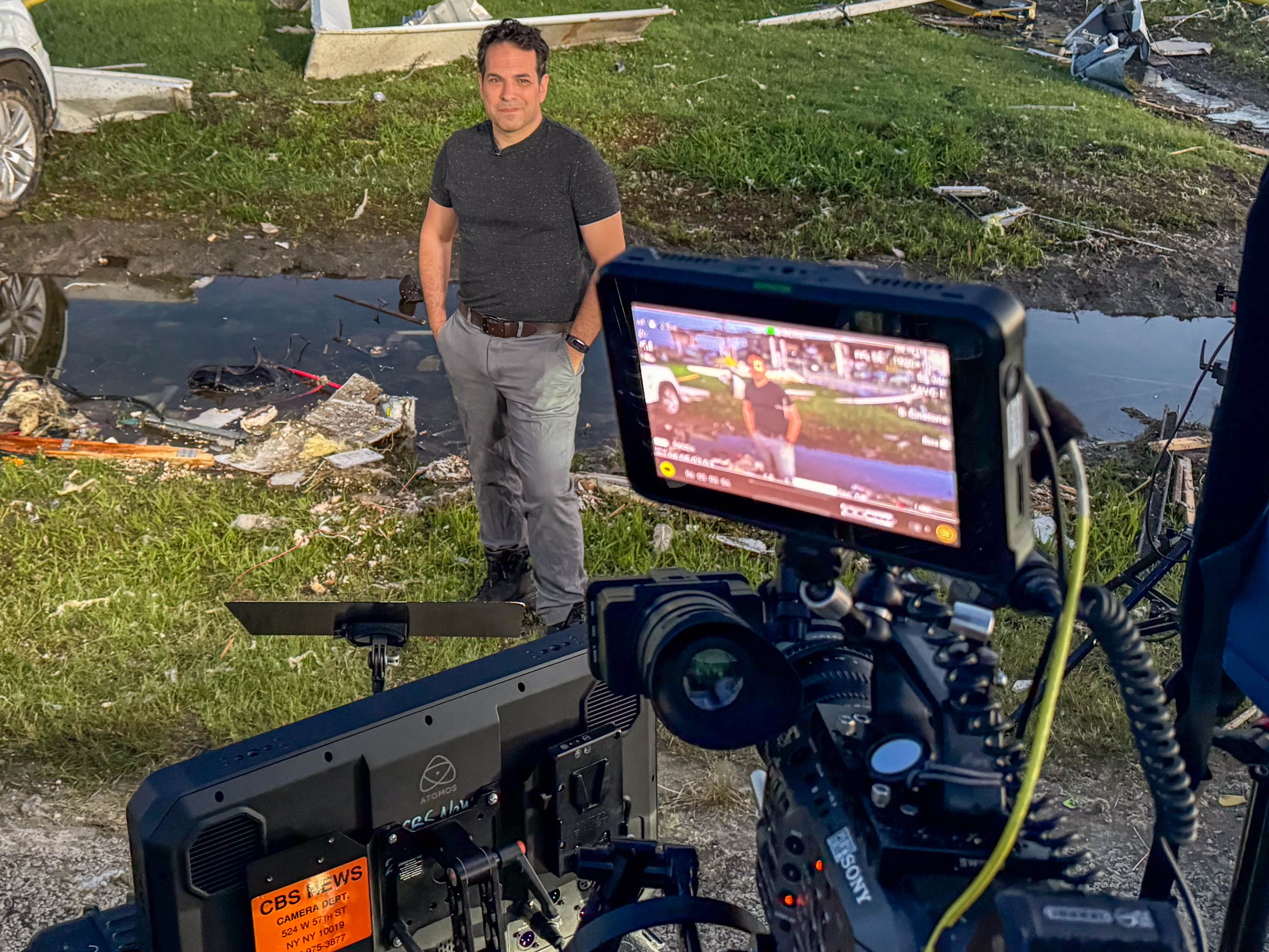
- Dave Malkoff covering a tornado outbreak
- Born: March 1, 1976 (age 50); Youngstown, Ohio
- Occupation: Television journalist
- Years active: 1994 – present
- Notable credit(s): CBS News; The Weather Channel; KTLA-TV; KCBS-TV; KCAL-TV; WFOR-TV; KRON-TV; KTNV-TV; WICD-TV; WBNS-TV; WKBN-TV; WYTV-TV
- Title: CBS News National Correspondent
- Website: Official website

Dave Malkoff (born March 1, 1976) is an American television journalist with CBS News. He has covered some of the most destructive hurricanes in US history. He has hosted more than a dozen documentaries that air on the network under the title "The Weather Channel Explores". He reported from Iraq at the end of Operation Iraqi Freedom in 2010. Malkoff produced an Emmy Award winning documentary about the war in Iraq.

== Career ==
Malkoff is a National Correspondent at CBS News based in Atlanta.

Malkoff was previously the Chief Environmental Correspondent for The Weather Channel. He reported on major weather events, science and technology. He frequently appeared on The Today Show, MSNBC, CNBC, CNBC Europe and NBC television stations nationwide.

Malkoff formerly reported for KTLA in Los Angeles, California. His daily "Malkoff on a Mission segments at 10PM were feature reports with a tech edge. In April 2007, he joined KCBS-TV and KCAL-TV, the CBS west coast-owned stations based in Los Angeles. His extended feature story reports would often appear as the "6:15 Spotlight" segment on KCBS's weekday-evening newscast.

His focus is science, technology and features along with general assignment and news reporting. His reporting career began at WICD-TV in Champaign, Illinois. Malkoff has been a reporter in Las Vegas, Miami and San Francisco. Early in his career, he was an associate producer in Columbus, Ohio.

== Personal life ==
Malkoff was born in Youngstown, Ohio where he got his start in broadcasting by running a low-power radio station in his Liberty Twp. basement.

He also built and ran the television station for Liberty High School before moving onto commercial radio and television. This was all before he started college at The Ohio State University.

Malkoff is married with a son and a daughter.

== Emmy Awards and nominations ==
- 2025 News & Documentary Emmy nomination: Outstanding Live News Special
- 2018 News & Documentary Emmy nomination: Outstanding Coverage of a Breaking News Story in a Newscast
- 2013 Los Angeles Regional Emmy nomination: Light News Story - Single Report
- 2013 Los Angeles Regional Emmy nomination: Outstanding News Feature Reporting
- 2012 Los Angeles Regional Emmy Award: Outstanding News Feature Reporting
- 2012 Los Angeles Regional Emmy Award: Medical News Story - Multi-Part Report
- 2012 Los Angeles Regional Emmy nomination: Light News Story - Single Report
- 2011 Los Angeles Regional Emmy Award: News Special
- 2011 Los Angeles Regional Emmy nomination: Light News Story - Single Report
- 2010 Los Angeles Regional Emmy nomination: Serious News Story - Single Report
- 2010 Los Angeles Regional Emmy nomination: Outstanding News Feature Reporting
- 2009 Los Angeles Regional Emmy nomination: Outstanding News Feature Reporting
- 2008 Los Angeles Regional Emmy nomination: Light News Story
- 2006 Suncoast Regional Emmy nomination: Spot News
- 2006 Suncoast Regional Emmy nomination: Reporter Features/Human Interest
- 2005 Suncoast Regional Emmy Award: Feature Segment
- 2004 Pacific Southwest Regional Emmy Award: News Feature (Same Day)
- 2004 Suncoast Regional Emmy Nomination: Spot News
- 2004 Suncoast Regional Emmy Nomination: Reporting
- 2001 Pacific Southwest Regional Emmy Nomination: Documentary
- 1998 Ohio Valley Regional Emmy Nomination: Newscast
- 1998 Ohio Valley Regional Emmy Award: Team Effort on News Event Coverage
