= Liberty High School (Ohio) =

Location
- 1 Leopard Way; Youngstown, Ohio 44505; United States; 41°09′22″N 80°39′18″W

Information
- Type: Public, coeducational
- Established: 1922
- School district: Liberty Local School District
- NCES School ID: 390501903871
- Principal: Thomas Zetts
- Teaching staff: 27.00 (FTE)
- Grades: 7–12
- Enrollment: 492 (2024–25)
- Student to teacher ratio: 18.22
- Colors: Maroon and gold
- Athletics conference: Mahoning Valley Athletic Conference
- Team name: Leopards
- Newspaper: The Leopard's Roar
- Yearbook: Oracle
- Website: www.libertylocalschools.org

Liberty High School is a public high school in Liberty Township, near Youngstown, Ohio. It is the only high school in the Liberty Local School District. Athletic teams are known as the Leopards, and they compete as a member of the Ohio High School Athletic Association in the Mahoning Valley Athletic Conference.

== History ==
Several small one-room schools serving Liberty Township, consolidated to form Liberty High School and the Liberty Local School District in 1922, with Liberty building its first high school on Churchill-Hubbard Road.

By the late 1990s, increasing educational needs and the aging infrastructure of the original high school, led to the construction of a new high school campus. Liberty's current high school was opened in 1999 adjacent to Leopard Stadium, replacing the former Churchill-Hubbard Road building. The former high school was sold in 2018, being transformed into a recreation and community center.

== Athletics ==
=== State championships ===
- Boys cross country – 1975
- Girls track and field – 1978

==== Associated Press poll winners ====
- Boys basketball – 1988, 1990

=== Facilities ===
==== Leopard Stadium ====
Leopard Stadium is an outdoor athletic complex adjacent to the high school building. Opened in 1979, the stadium features a six-lane all-weather track with an artificial turf field and is able to fit up to 3,000 people. The stadium is used for the high school's track and field, soccer, and football teams.

== Notable alumni ==
- Amy Acton - former director of the Ohio Department of Health
- Jerry DePizzo - musician in O.A.R.
- Bob DiPiero - country music song writer
- Bradley Fletcher - former professional football player in the National Football League (NFL)
- Dave Malkoff - CBS News National Correspondent
- Fitzgerald Toussaint - former professional football player in the National Football League (NFL)
- Jimmy Weller III - former NASCAR driver
