= Perfect Stranger (Southern Pacific song) =

Single by Southern Pacific

from the album Southern Pacific
- B-side: "Bluebird Wine"
- Released: November 16, 1985
- Genre: Country
- Length: 4:08
- Label: Warner Bros.
- Songwriter(s): Tim Goodman, John McFee
- Producer(s): Jim Ed Norman, Southern Pacific, Brad Hartman

Southern Pacific singles chronology
"Thing About You" (1985)	"Perfect Stranger" (1985)	"Reno Bound" (1986)

"Perfect Stranger" is a song written by Tim Goodman and John McFee, and recorded by American country music group Southern Pacific. It was released in November 1985 as the second single from the album Southern Pacific. The song reached number 18 on the Billboard Hot Country Singles & Tracks chart.

== Chart performance ==
Chart (1985–1986)	Peak position
US Hot Country Songs (Billboard)	18
Canadian RPM Country Tracks	24
