= Zuma (Southern Pacific album) =

Studio album by Southern Pacific
- Released: 1988
- Studios: Conway, Capitol and The Grey Room (Hollywood, California); Lion Share (Los Angeles, California); The Plant (Sausalito, California); O'Henry (Burbank, California); Lizard Rock (Solvang, California); Sixteenth Avenue Sound (Nashville, Tennessee)
- Genre: Country rock
- Length: 37:12
- Label: Warner Bros.
- Producers: Southern Pacific; Jim Ed Norman

Southern Pacific chronology
Killbilly Hill (1986)	Zuma (1988)	County Line (1990)

Singles from Zuma
- 1. "Midnight Highway" Released: April 9, 1988; 2. "New Shade of Blue" Released: July 1988; 3. "Honey I Dare You" Released: January 1989; 4. "All Is Lost" Released: 1989

Zuma is the third studio album by American country music group Southern Pacific. It was released in 1988 via Warner Bros. Records. The album includes the singles "Midnight Highway", "New Shade of Blue", and "Honey I Dare You" and "All Is Lost". It was the band's first album with David Jenkins. Huey Lewis plays harmonica on the songs "Wheels on the Line" and "Bail Out".

== Critical reception ==
The Toronto Star wrote that "what these guys have in their favor is a sense of the romance of West Coast country-rock; they're not just Nashvillers on a lark or neo-country twangers, but genuine inheritors of a tradition."

== Track listing ==
No.	Title	Writer(s)	Length
1.	"Midnight Highway"	Kurt Howell, John McFee	3:46
2.	"Honey I Dare You"	David Jenkins, Stu Cook, John McFee, Dave Gibson, Craig Karp	3:48
3.	"New Shade of Blue"	McFee, Andre Pessis	3:44
4.	"Dream On"	McFee, Pessis	3:51
5.	"The Invisible Man"	Mac McAnally	3:14
6.	"Wheels on the Line"	McFee, Pessis	3:58
7.	"Just Hang On"	Howell, McFee	3:54
8.	"All Is Lost"	Cook, Howell, Gibson, Karp	3:49
9.	"Bail Out"	Craig Bickhardt, Bill LaBounty	3:18
10.	"Trail of Tears"	McFee, Pessis	3:50

== Personnel ==
Southern Pacific

- Kurt Howell – keyboards, vocals, lead vocals (3, 8)
- David Jenkins – guitars, vocals, lead vocals (1, 2, 5, 7, 9)
- John McFee – guitars, pedal steel guitar, mandolin, fiddle, vocals, lead vocals (4, 6, 10)
- Stu Cook – bass, vocals
- Keith Knudsen – drums, vocals

Guest musicians

- Huey Lewis – harmonica (6, 9)
- The Nashville String Machine – strings (10)
- Carl Gorodetzky – concertmaster (10)

Production

- Southern Pacific – producers, arrangements
- Jim Ed Norman – producer, arrangements
- Csaba Pectoz – recording, mixing
- Robert Missbach – additional engineer
- Eric Prestidge – additional engineer
- Will Rogers – additional engineer
- Sally Browder – assistant engineer
- Jim Dineen – assistant engineer
- Peter Doell – assistant engineer
- Jared Held – assistant engineer
- Stuart Hirotsu – assistant engineer
- Danny Johnston – assistant engineer
- Richard McKernan – assistant engineer
- Dan Marnien – assistant engineer
- Ray Pyle – assistant engineer
- Larry Walsh – assistant engineer
- Bob Ludwig – mastering at Masterdisk (New York City, New York)
- Gabrielle Raumberger – art direction
- Carol Roy – design
- Lori Lohstoeter – illustration
- Jeff Katz – photography

== Chart performance ==
Chart (1988)	Peak position
US Top Country Albums (Billboard)	27
