= Don't Let Go of My Heart =

"Don't Let of My Heart"

Single by Southern Pacific

from the album Killbilly Hill
- B-side: "What's It Gonna Take"
- Released: March 21, 1987
- Genre: Country
- Length: 4:16
- Label: Warner Bros.
- Songwriter(s): Kurt Howell, Harry Maslin
- Producer(s): Southern Pacific, Jim Ed Norman

Southern Pacific singles chronology
"Killbilly Hill" (1986)	"Don't Let of My Heart" (1987)	"Midnight Highway" (1988)

"Don't Let Go of My Heart" is a song recorded by American country music group Southern Pacific. It was released in March 1987 as the third single from their 1986 album Killbilly Hill. The song reached No. 26 on the Billboard Hot Country Singles & Tracks chart. The song was written by Kurt Howell and Harry Maslin.

== Chart performance ==
Chart (1987)	Peak position
US Hot Country Songs (Billboard)	26
Canadian RPM Country Tracks	27
