= Time's Up (Southern Pacific and Carlene Carter song) =

Single by Southern Pacific and Carlene Carter

Single by Southern Pacific and Carlene Carter

from the album County Line
- B-side: "Memphis Queen"
- Released: December 2, 1989
- Genre: Country
- Length: 3:22
- Label: Warner Bros.
- Songwriters: Kevin Welch, Wendy Waldman, Harry Stinson
- Producers: Southern Pacific, Jim Ed Norman

Southern Pacific singles chronology
"Any Way the Wind Blows" (1989)	"Time's Up" (1989)	"I Go to Pieces" (1990)

Carlene Carter singles chronology
"Heart to Heart" (1983)	"Time's Up" (1989)	"I Fell in Love" (1990)

"Time's Up" is a song written by Kevin Welch, Wendy Waldman and Harry Stinson, and recorded by American country music group Southern Pacific and country singer Carlene Carter. It was released in December 1989 as the second single from Southern Pacific's album County Line. The song reached number 26 on the Billboard Hot Country Singles & Tracks chart.

== Chart performance ==
Chart (1989–1990)	Peak position
Canada Country Singles (RPM)	19
US Hot Country Songs (Billboard)	26
