= Honey I Dare You =

Single by Southern Pacific

from the album Zuma
- B-side: "Trail of Tears"
- Released: January 1989
- Genre: Country
- Length: 3:51
- Label: Warner Bros.
- Songwriter(s): David Jenkins; Stu Cook; John McFee; Dave Gibson; Craig Karp
- Producer(s): Southern Pacific, Jim Ed Norman

Southern Pacific singles chronology
"New Shade of Blue" (1988)	"Honey I Dare You" (1989)	"All is Lost" (1989)

"Honey I Dare You" is a song recorded by American country music group Southern Pacific. It was released in January 1989 as the third single from the album Zuma. The song reached number 5 on the Billboard Hot Country Singles & Tracks chart. The song was written by band members David Jenkins, Stu Cook, and John McFee with Nashville songwriters Dave Gibson and Craig Karp.

== Content ==
The song is composed in the key of E major, with a modulation to F major in the last verse.

== Chart performance ==
Chart (1989)	Peak position
US Hot Country Songs (Billboard)	5

=== Year-end charts ===
Chart (1989)	Position
Canada Country Tracks (RPM)	41
US Country Songs (Billboard)	72
