= Reckless Heart =

Single by Southern Pacific

from the album County Line
- B-side: "Side Saddle"
- Released: August 11, 1990
- Genre: Country
- Length: 3:35
- Label: Warner Bros.
- Songwriter(s): John McFee, Andre Pessis
- Producer(s): Southern Pacific, Jim Ed Norman

Southern Pacific singles chronology
"I Go to Pieces" (1990)	"Reckless Heart" (1990)	"Memphis Queen" (1990)

"Reckless Heart" is a song recorded by American country music group Southern Pacific. It was released in August 1990 as the fourth single from the album County Line. The song reached #32 on the Billboard Hot Country Singles & Tracks chart. The song was written by John McFee and Andre Pessis.

== Chart performance ==
Chart (1990)	Peak position
US Hot Country Songs (Billboard)	32
Canadian RPM Country Tracks	23
