= Midnight Highway =

Single by Southern Pacific

from the album Zuma
- B-side: "What's It Gonna Take"
- Released: April 9, 1988
- Genre: Country
- Length: 3:47
- Label: Warner Bros.
- Songwriter(s): John McFee, Kurt Howell
- Producer(s): Southern Pacific, Jim Ed Norman

Southern Pacific singles chronology
"Don't Let Go of My Heart" (1987)	"Midnight Highway" (1988)	"New Shade of Blue" (1988)

"Midnight Highway" is a song written by John McFee and Kurt Howell, and recorded by American country music group Southern Pacific. The single features former Pablo Cruise member David Jenkins on the lead vocal. The song was released in April 1988 as the first single from the album Zuma. The song reached number 14 on the Billboard Hot Country Singles & Tracks chart.

== Chart performance ==
Chart (1988)	Peak position
US Hot Country Songs (Billboard)	14
Canadian RPM Country Tracks	16
