= Churchill, Ohio =

- Census-designated place
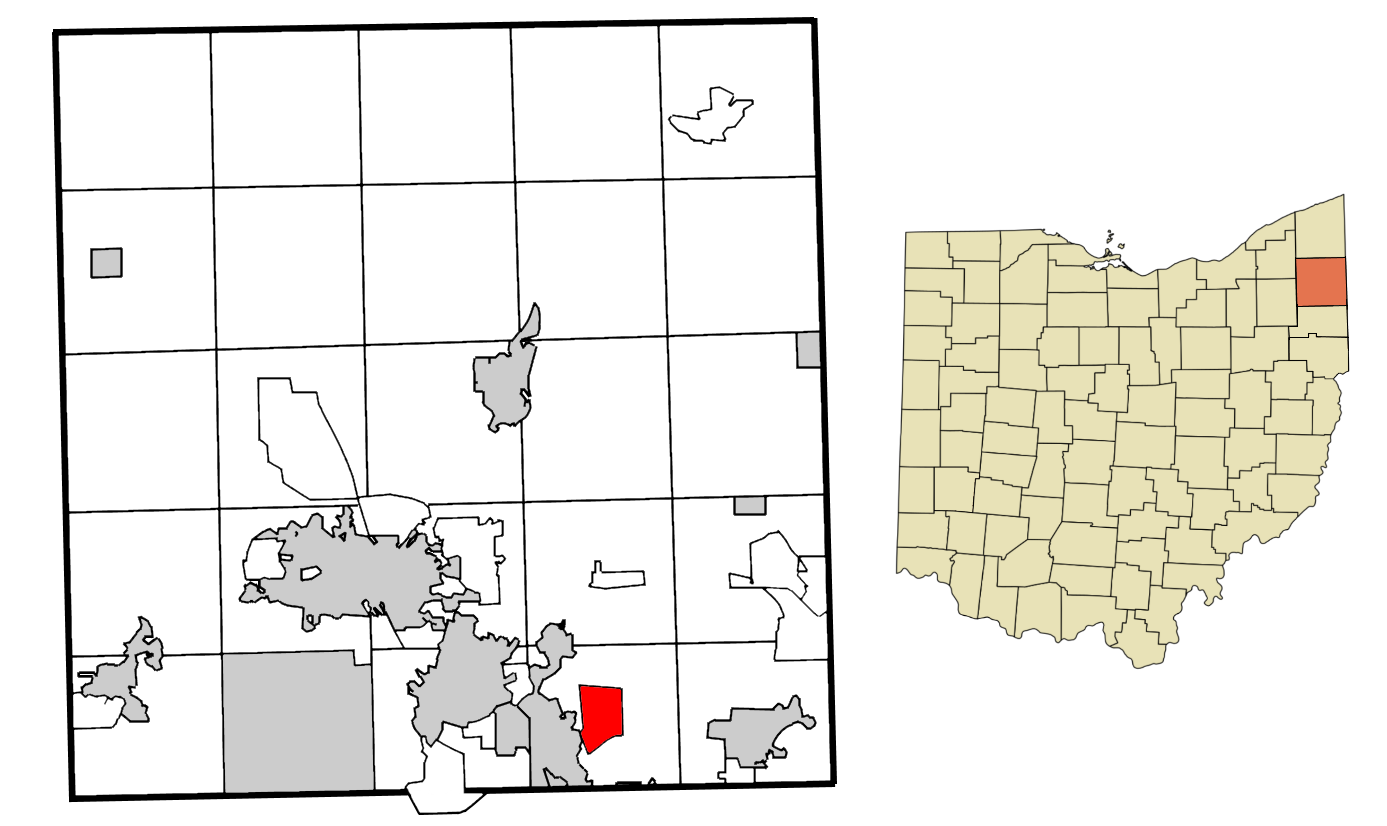
- Location of Churchill in Trumbull County, Ohio.
- Coordinates: 41°10′10″N 80°39′58″W
- Country: United States
- State: Ohio
- County: Trumbull
- Township: Liberty

Area
  - Total: 2.52 sq mi (6.52 km^{2})
  - Land: 2.52 sq mi (6.52 km^{2})
  - Water: 0 sq mi (0.00 km^{2})
- Elevation: 1,076 ft (328 m)

Population (2020)
  - Total: 2,176
  - Density: 865.0/sq mi (333.97/km^{2})
- Time zone: UTC-5 (Eastern (EST))
  - Summer (DST): UTC-4 (EDT)
- FIPS code: 39-14324
- GNIS feature ID: 2393378

Churchill is a census-designated place in Liberty Township, Trumbull County, Ohio, United States. The population was 2,176 at the 2020 census. It is part of Youngstown–Warren metropolitan area. The community was named for a hilltop church near the original townsite.

== Geography ==
According to the United States Census Bureau, the CDP has a total area of 2.5 square miles (6.5 km^{2}), all land.

== Demographics ==
Historical population
Census	Pop.	Note	%±
2020	2,176		—
U.S. Decennial Census

As of the census of 2000, there were 2,601 people, 1,057 households, and 755 families residing in the CDP. The population density was 1,043.1 inhabitants per square mile (402.7/km^{2}). There were 1,165 housing units at an average density of 467.2 per square mile (180.4/km^{2}). The racial makeup of the CDP was 87.77% White, 10.07% African American, 0.04% Native American, 0.42% Asian, 0.42% from other races, and 1.27% from two or more races. Hispanic or Latino of any race were 1.35% of the population.

There were 1,057 households, out of which 28.2% had children under the age of 18 living with them, 53.5% were married couples living together, 13.5% had a female householder with no husband present, and 28.5% were non-families. 24.1% of all households were made up of individuals, and 10.4% had someone living alone who was 65 years of age or older. The average household size was 2.46 and the average family size was 2.91.

In the CDP the population was spread out, with 21.7% under the age of 18, 7.8% from 18 to 24, 26.3% from 25 to 44, 28.0% from 45 to 64, and 16.1% who were 65 years of age or older. The median age was 41 years. For every 100 females there were 97.5 males. For every 100 females age 18 and over, there were 89.7 males.

The median income for a household in the CDP was $36,667, and the median income for a family was $44,485. Males had a median income of $36,618 versus $21,150 for females. The per capita income for the CDP was $22,973. About 9.0% of families and 11.2% of the population were below the poverty line, including 13.7% of those under age 18 and 9.0% of those age 65 or over.
