= New Shade of Blue =

Single by Southern Pacific

from the album Zuma
- B-side: "Just Hang On"
- Released: July 1988
- Genre: Country
- Length: 3:45
- Label: Warner Bros.
- Songwriter(s): John McFee, Andre Pessis
- Producer(s): Southern Pacific, Jim Ed Norman

Southern Pacific singles chronology
"Midnight Highway" (1988)	"New Shade of Blue" (1988)	"Honey I Dare You" (1989)

"New Shade of Blue" is a song written by John McFee and Andre Pessis, and recorded by American country music group Southern Pacific. It was released in July 1988 as the second single from the album Zuma. The song reached number 2 on the Billboard Hot Country Singles & Tracks chart.

== Charts ==
=== Weekly charts ===
Chart (1988)	Peak position
US Hot Country Songs (Billboard)	2
Canadian RPM Country Tracks	1

=== Year-end charts ===
Chart (1988)	Position
Canadian RPM Country Tracks	5
US Hot Country Songs (Billboard)	39
