= Fitzgerald Toussaint =

American football player (born 1990)

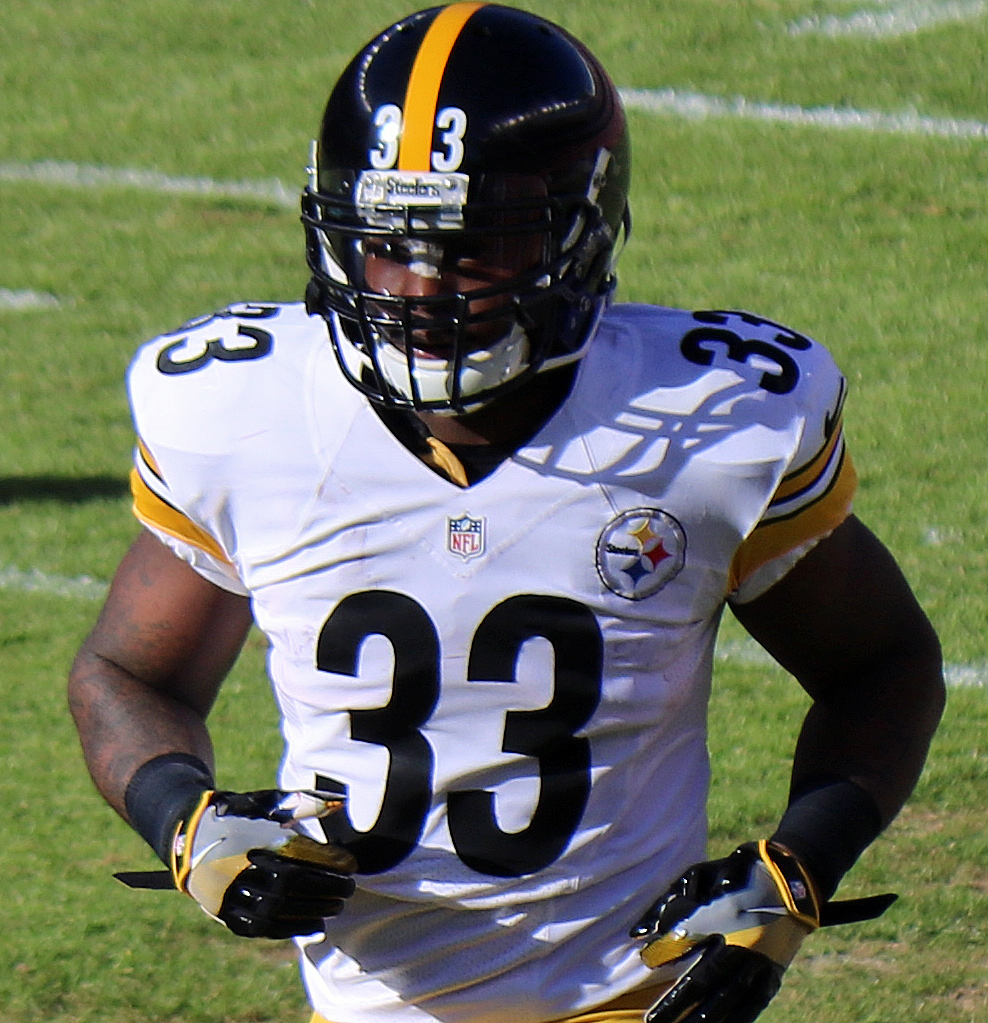
- Toussaint with the Pittsburgh Steelers in 2016

No. 33, 43
- Position: Running back

Personal information
- Born: May 4, 1990 (age 36); East Orange, New Jersey, U.S.
- Listed height: 5 ft 9 in (1.75 m)
- Listed weight: 204 lb (93 kg)

Career information
- High school: Liberty (Youngstown, Ohio)
- College: Michigan
- NFL draft: 2014: undrafted

Career history
- Baltimore Ravens (2014); Pittsburgh Steelers (2015–2017)

Career NFL statistics
- Rushing yards: 137
- Rushing average: 3.1
- Receptions: 8
- Receiving yards: 69
- Stats at Pro Football Reference

Fitzgerald D'Andre Toussaint (born May 4, 1990) is an American former professional football player who was a running back in the National Football League (NFL). He played college football for the Michigan Wolverines and signed with the Baltimore Ravens as an undrafted free agent in 2014. He also played for the Pittsburgh Steelers for three seasons.

== Early life ==
Toussaint grew up in Youngstown, Ohio, to a Haitian father and to an African American mother. He graduated from Liberty High School, where as a senior in 2009, he rushed for 2,229 yards (10.4 per carry) and 28 touchdowns and was named Ohio's co-offensive player of the year in Division III. Toussaint committed to the University of Michigan after his senior year. After committing to Michigan, Toussaint donned the scarlet uniform of the Ohio high school all-star team for the annual Big 33 Football Classic against the Pennsylvania high school all-star team.

Toussaint was also on the school's track & field team, where he competed as a sprinter. At the 2007 OHSAA Regional Track and Field Championships, he won the 100 meters by running a personal-best time of 10.74 seconds. He also won the 60 meters at the 2009 Kent State HS Open, recording a career-best time of 6.89 seconds.

On September 23, 2022, Toussaint was inducted into the Liberty High School Hall of Fame.

== College career ==
Toussaint enrolled at the University of Michigan on a football scholarship in 2009. He was redshirted during the 2009 season. Toussaint missed the first three games of the 2010 season with a knee injury. In his first appearance for the Wolverines, Toussaint rushed for 129 yards on six carries, including a 61-yard gain in the fourth quarter, against Bowling Green. He suffered a shoulder injury in October 2010.

=== 2011 season ===
After spending the 2010 season as a back-up to Michael Shaw, Toussaint challenged Shaw for the starting running back position during 2011 summer practice. In the end, head coach Brady Hoke named Toussaint as the Wolverines' No. 1 running back at the start of the 2011 season. After gaining 80 yards on 11 carries (7.3 yards per carry) and scoring two touchdowns in Michigan's 2011 season opener against Western Michigan, Hoke confirmed that Toussaint remained the team's No. 1 running back.

After suffering a shoulder injury, he did not play against Notre Dame in the second week of the season. He returned to the lineup the following week and went on to record his second 100-yard rushing game in the Battle for the Little Brown Jug against Minnesota in the fifth game of the season, totaling 108 yards on 11 carries for an average of 9.8 yards per carry.

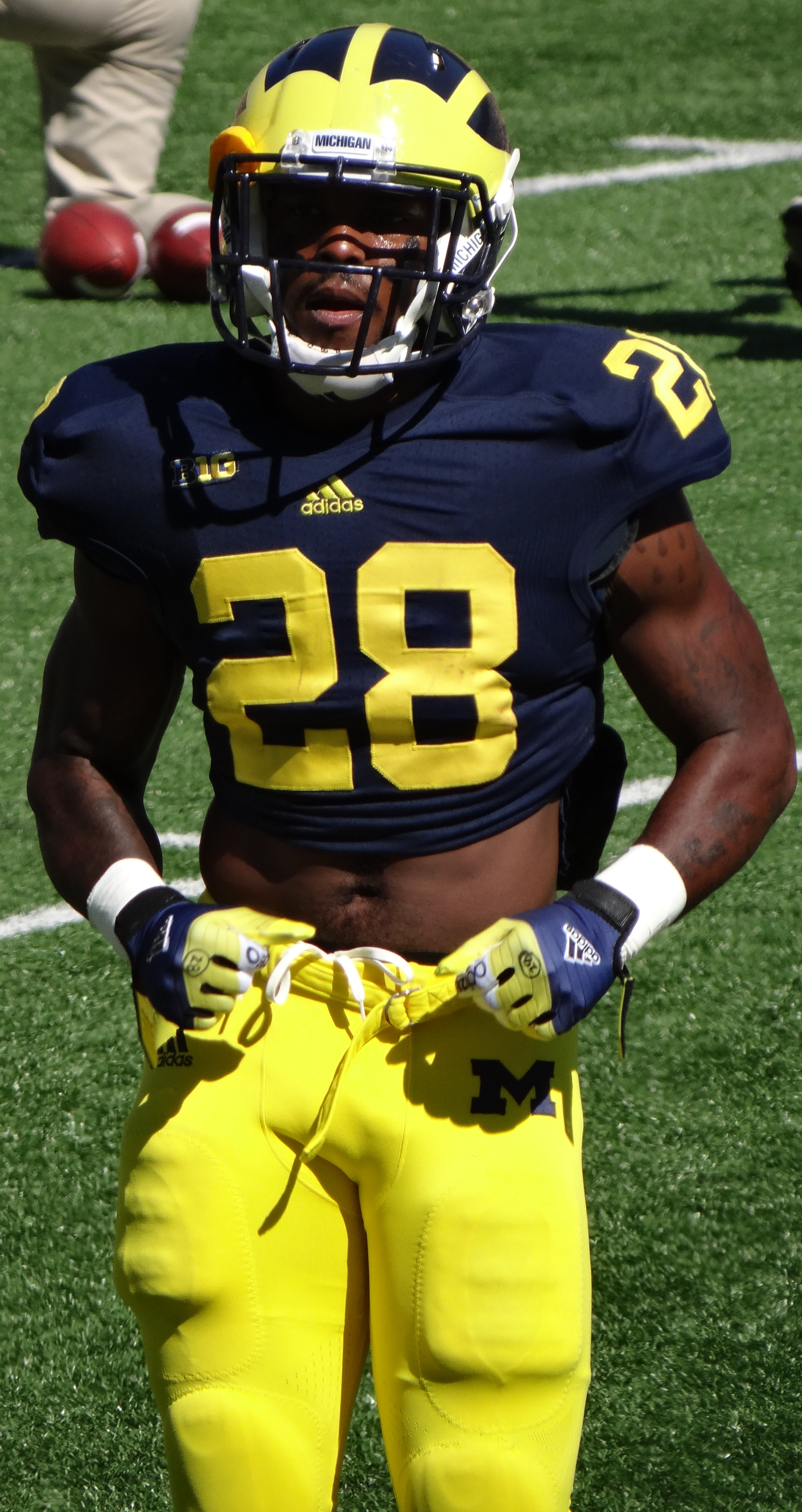
Toussaint at Michigan Stadium in September 2012

On October 29, Toussaint ran for 170 yards and two touchdowns on 20 carries in a 36–14 victory over Purdue. He had career highs in both yards gained and carries. On November 12, Toussaint set new career highs with 27 carries, a 65-yard run, and 192 rushing yards against Illinois. In the subsequent two weeks, he followed up with 138 rushing yards against Nebraska on November 19, 2011, and 120 yards rushing against Ohio State on November 26, in "The Game".

Toussaint rushed for 1,041 yards in the 2011 season. With quarterback Denard Robinson also rushing for over 1,000 yards, the Wolverines had a tandem of 1,000-yard rushers for the first time since 1975. Toussaint averaged 5.6 yards per carry during the season. He ranked second in the Big Ten Conference in yards per carry behind Wisconsin running back Montee Ball. He earned All-Big Ten Conference honorable mention recognition from both the coaches and the media. At the end of the regular season, Michigan offensive coordinator Al Borges praised Toussaint's late season performance (100-plus rushing yards in four of the last five games) and compared him to USC Heisman Trophy winner Charles White: "You put the (USC) jersey on him, you would hardly be able to tell the difference. That's who he reminds me of."

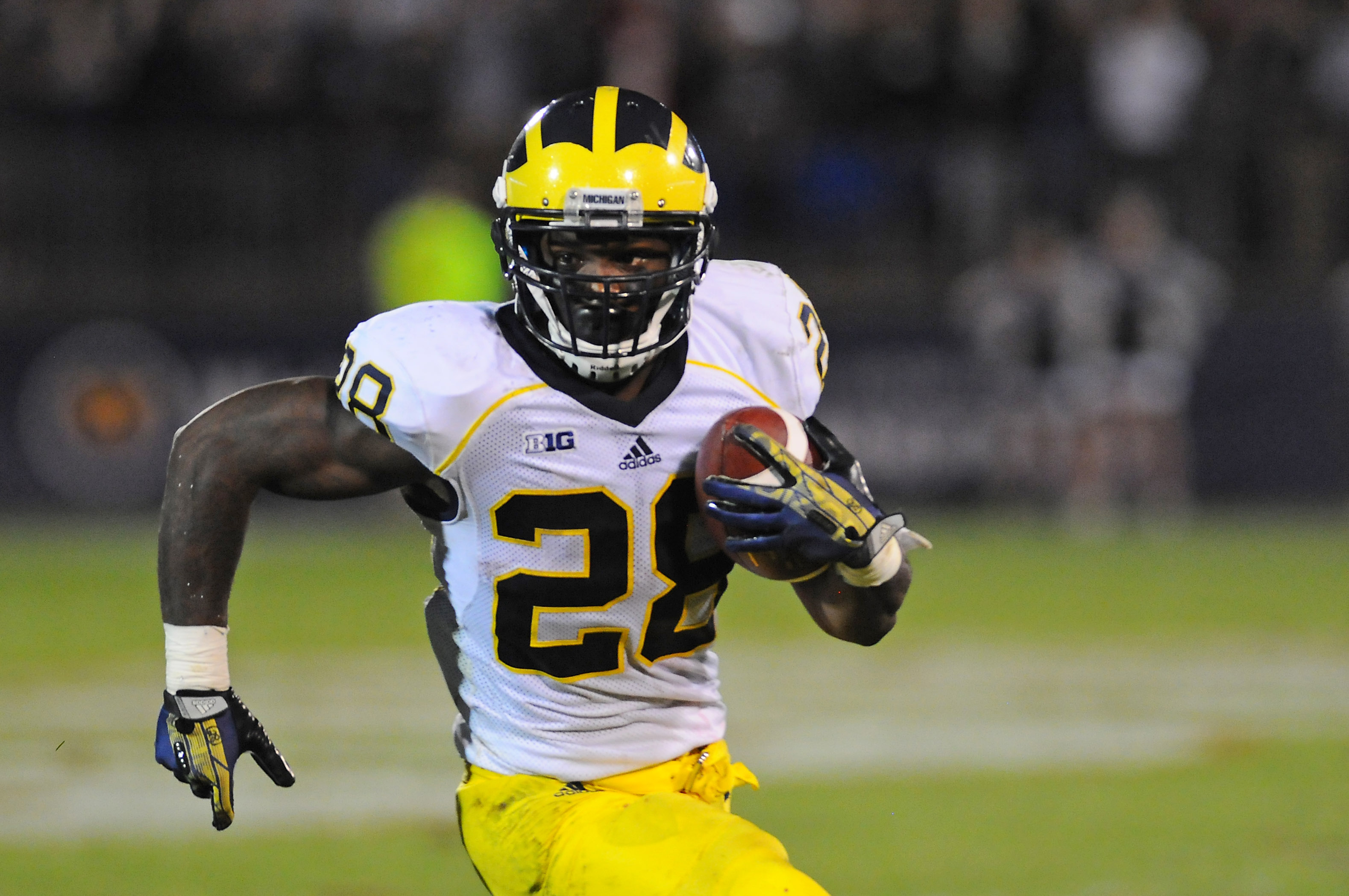
Troussaint in 2013

=== 2012 season ===
At the time of Michigan's spring practice in April 2012, Borges said there was no running back controversy for the 2012 team: "Fitz is our tailback. If he isn't, I'm not very smart."

On July 21, 2012, Toussaint was arrested in Ann Arbor after running a red light and charged with driving under the influence. On July 23, he was suspended from the team. In late August, Toussaint pleaded guilty to operating a vehicle while visibly impaired, after telling the court that he had been drinking brandy before driving. On October 23, he was sentenced to 10 months probation and ordered by the Court to attend 10 Alcoholics Anonymous meetings, pay $1,500 in fees and fines, and undergo random drug and alcohol tests.

Toussaint remained suspended from the team for the opening game of the 2012 season, but returned to the lineup as Michigan's lead running back in the second week of the season against Air Force. Through the tenth game of the 2012 season, Toussaint had gained 483 yards and scored five touchdown on 127 carries, an average of 3.8 yards per carry.

On November 17, 2012, during a first quarter run in the game against the Iowa Hawkeyes, Toussaint sustained a broken leg, ending his season.

=== 2013 season ===
After successful rehabilitation on his leg injury, Toussaint returned as the starting running back for the 2013 Michigan Wolverines football team. Through the first two games of the season, he had 128 rushing yards on 36 carries, including 71 rushing yards on 22 carries in Michigan's 41–30 victory over Notre Dame on September 7, 2013. On October 19, against Indiana, he had 32 carries for 151 rushing yards and four rushing touchdowns. He finished his final season with the Wolverines with 185 carries for 648 rushing yards and 13 rushing touchdowns.

== Professional career ==
=== Pre-draft ===
Pre-draft measurables
| Height | Weight | Arm length | Hand span | 40-yard dash | 10-yard split | 20-yard split | 20-yard shuttle | Three-cone drill | Vertical jump | Broad jump | Bench press |
|---|---|---|---|---|---|---|---|---|---|---|---|
| 5 ft 8 7/8 in (1.75 m) | 204 lb (93 kg) | 30 7/8 in (0.78 m) | 9 5/8 in (0.24 m) | 4.53 s | 1.59 s | 2.56 s | 4.10 s | 6.59 s | 35 1/2 in (0.90 m) | 10 ft 2 in (3.10 m) | 24 reps |
All values from Michigan's Pro Day

=== Baltimore Ravens ===
==== 2014 ====
On May 29, 2014, Toussaint was signed as an undrafted free agent by the Baltimore Ravens of the National Football League. Toussaint rushed for 20 yards on four attempts during the Ravens' first preseason game against the San Francisco 49ers. He did not play again until the fourth preseason game against the New Orleans Saints, where he rushed for a game-high 103 yards on 17 carries and caught his only targeted pass for another nine yards. Despite his successful play in the final game of the preseason, Toussaint was released by the Ravens on August 30, 2014, in the final round of cuts before the regular season. Toussaint was re-signed to the Ravens practice squad on August 31, 2014. Toussaint was promoted to the Ravens roster on September 6, 2014, after fellow running back Lorenzo Taliaferro was placed on injured reserve.

On September 21, 2014, he made his professional regular season debut during the Ravens' 23–21 victory over the Cleveland Browns. On December 21, 2014, Toussiant had his first career carry for a two-yard gain and had his first career reception on a five-yard pass from Joe Flacco. He finished the 25–13 loss to the Houston Texans with a total of four carries for 11-yards and two receptions for 20-yards. He finished his rookie season with six carries for 12 rushing yards and three receptions for 27 receiving yards in four games. Throughout his rookie campaign, Toussaint was the Baltimore Ravens' fourth-string running back, behind Justin Forsett, Lorenzo Taliaferro, and Bernard Pierce.

On January 3, 2015, Toussaint appeared in his first career postseason game after the Baltimore Ravens finished the 2014 season with a 10–6 record. Although he appeared exclusively on special teams, the Ravens defeated the Pittsburgh Steelers 30–17 in the AFC Wild Card Round. The following game, he had two carries for five rushing yards and one reception or −7 receiving yards as the Ravens lost to the New England Patriots 31–35 in the Divisional Round.

==== 2015 ====
He entered training camp competing with Javorius Allen and Terrence Magee to be the Ravens' third running back.

On September 5, 2015, he was released by the Ravens after losing the third string running back position to Javorius Allen.

=== Pittsburgh Steelers ===
On September 7, 2015, Toussaint was signed to the Pittsburgh Steelers' practice squad. On November 27, Toussaint was promoted to the active roster.

He earned the Steelers' second-string running back position from Jordan Todman as the regular season came to a close. Toussaint caught the Steelers' eighth two-point conversion of the season against the Cleveland Browns in Week 17, setting the NFL record for most successful two-point conversion attempts by a team in a season.

On January 8, 2016, Toussaint was announced as the starter for Steelers' Wild Card Round playoff game against the Cincinnati Bengals due to an injury to DeAngelo Williams. Toussaint and Todman combined for 123 rushing yards, and Toussaint added four receptions for 60 yards. In the second round of the playoffs, on January 17, Toussaint scored his first touchdown as a professional but also had a fumble late in the 4th quarter which eventually resulted in the Denver Broncos' game-winning drive.

==== 2016 ====
Toussaint competed with Brandon Brown-Dukes, Daryl Richardson, Cameron Stingily, and Brandon Johnson for the third string backup running back position. He was named the Pittsburgh Steelers third running back on their depth chart to begin the regular season.

He finished the season with 14 carries for 58 rushing yards and three receptions for 33 receiving yards while appearing in all 16 regular season games.

==== 2017 ====
Toussaint signed a one-year deal to remain with the Steelers on January 31, 2017. Toussaint competed with Terrell Watson, Knile Davis, Brandon Brown-Dukes, and Trey Williams to be the third running back on the depth chart.

On September 2, Toussaint was waived by the Steelers, and was then re-signed to the practice squad the next day. He was promoted to the active roster on November 25. In the regular season, he had six carries for 25 rushing yards in six games.

==== 2018 ====
On September 1, 2018, Toussaint was released by the Steelers.
