= Mike McKnight =

- Occupations: Keyboardist, composer, programmer
- Instrument: Keyboards
- Website: www.mcknightsoundsinc.com

Mike McKnight is an American keyboardist, musical director, music programmer, and journalist who is best known for his work on live tours of major artists such as Madonna, Mariah Carey, Janet Jackson, Shakira, and many more. He is also a columnist for Keyboard Magazine.
