= Bradley Fletcher =

American football player (born 1986)

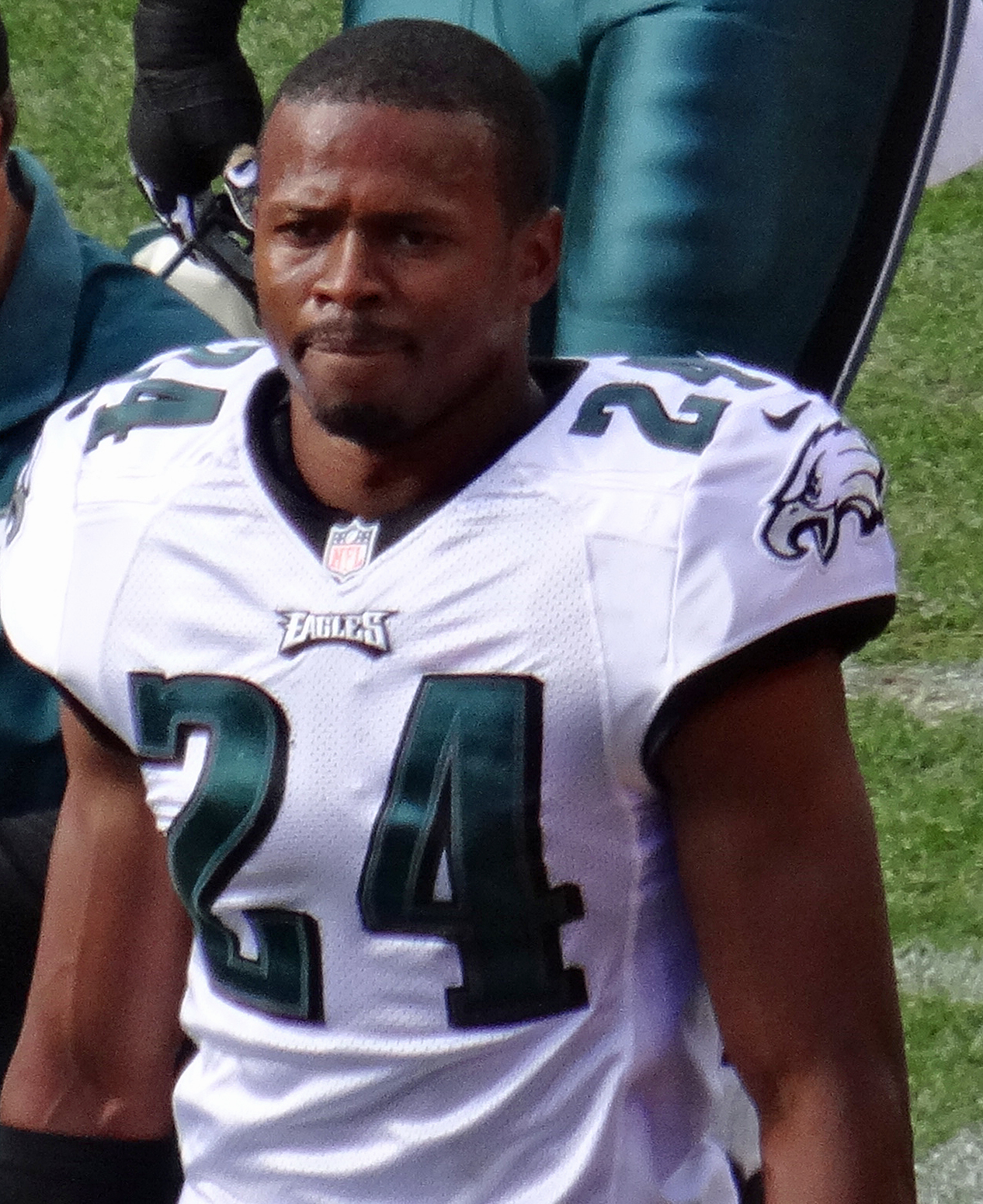
- Fletcher with the Philadelphia Eagles in 2013

No. 24, 32
- Position: Cornerback

Personal information
- Born: June 25, 1986 (age 40); Youngstown, Ohio, U.S.
- Listed height: 6 ft 0 in (1.83 m)
- Listed weight: 196 lb (89 kg)

Career information
- High school: Liberty (Youngstown)
- College: Iowa
- NFL draft: 2009: 3rd round, 66th overall pick

Career history
- St. Louis Rams (2009–2012); Philadelphia Eagles (2013–2014); New England Patriots (2015)

Career NFL statistics
- Total tackles: 291
- Sacks: 1
- Forced fumbles: 4
- Fumble recoveries: 4
- Interceptions: 8
- Defensive Touchdowns: 1
- Stats at Pro Football Reference

Bradley Fletcher (born June 25, 1986) is an American former professional football player who was a cornerback in the National Football League (NFL). He was selected by the St. Louis Rams of the National Football League (NFL) in the third round of the 2009 NFL draft. He played college football for the Iowa Hawkeyes.

Fletcher also played for the Philadelphia Eagles and New England Patriots.

== Early life ==
At Liberty High School, in Youngstown, Ohio, Fletcher was First-team All-Conference, All-District, and All-State as a senior, where he had 74 tackles, 43 solo tackles, two interceptions and six pass break-ups on defense and on offense, as a running back, rushed 143 times for 815 yards 12 touchdowns as a senior. As a junior, he was named First-team All-Conference and honorable mention All-State. He recorded 207 tackles, 81 solo tackles, 13 pass break-ups and four interceptions in prep career along with 17 receptions for 314 yards. Fletcher was also an All-State basketball player.

== College career ==
As a senior at Iowa in 2008 Fletcher recorded 60 tackles, including 42 solo stops and 18 assists and led team with 10 pass break-ups while intercepting three passes. Fletcher redshirted as a freshman in 2004 and saw action as a backup in 2005, recording one tackle in the ten games he played. He was again a backup in 2006 playing in 13 games with 4 starts, recording 38 tackles (24 solo) and a forced fumble. As a junior in 2007 he played the same role as 2006, a backup cornerback. In 2007, he played in 11 games, starting four, recording 52 tackles (30 solo) and intercepted two passes, forced a fumble and recovered one as well while breaking up three passes.

== Professional career ==
Pre-draft measurables
Height	Weight	Arm length	Hand span	40-yard dash	10-yard split	20-yard split	20-yard shuttle	Three-cone drill	Vertical jump	Broad jump	Bench press	Wonderlic
6 ft 0 3/8 in (1.84 m)	196 lb (89 kg)	33 1/2 in (0.85 m)	9 1/4 in (0.23 m)	4.44 s	1.53 s	2.59 s	4.22 s	7.04 s	40 in (1.02 m)	10 ft 7 in (3.23 m)	20 reps	13
All values from NFL Combine/Pro Day

=== St. Louis Rams ===
Fletcher was selected by the St. Louis Rams in the third round of the 2009 NFL draft with the 66th overall pick.

=== Philadelphia Eagles ===
Fletcher signed with the Philadelphia Eagles on March 12, 2013. In 2014, he allowed the most yards in the NFL (1,072) and the second most touchdowns allowed (9). After two years with the team, the Eagles decided not to re-sign Fletcher and he left in free agency.

=== New England Patriots ===
Fletcher signed with the New England Patriots on March 18, 2015. He played in two games with New England and was released on October 10.

== NFL career statistics ==
Legend
	Led the league
**Bold**	Career high

=== Regular season ===
Year	Team	Games		Tackles					Interceptions					Fumbles			
Year	Team	GP	GS	Cmb	Solo	Ast	Sck	TFL	Int	Yds	TD	Lng	PD	FF	FR	Yds	TD
2009	STL	7	3	23	23	0	0.0	2	0	0	0	0	1	0	**1**	-2	0
2010	STL	16	15	**75**	**65**	**10**	0.0	**3**	**4**	**41**	0	28	11	0	**1**	**43**	0
2011	STL	4	4	24	23	1	0.0	0	0	0	0	0	1	0	0	0	0
2012	STL	16	4	28	23	5	**1.0**	0	1	2	0	2	8	**1**	0	0	0
2013	PHI	13	13	70	62	8	0.0	0	2	30	0	25	15	**1**	**1**	0	0
2014	PHI	15	15	61	54	7	0.0	1	1	34	**1**	**34**	**22**	**1**	**1**	0	0
2015	NWE	2	0	10	8	2	0.0	0	0	0	0	0	0	**1**	0	0	0
		73	54	291	258	33	1.0	6	8	107	1	34	58	4	4	41	0

=== Postseason ===
Year	Team	Games		Tackles					Interceptions					Fumbles			
Year	Team	GP	GS	Cmb	Solo	Ast	Sck	TFL	Int	Yds	TD	Lng	PD	FF	FR	Yds	TD
2013	PHI	1	1	4	4	0	0.0	0	1	24	0	24	1	0	0	0	0
		1	1	4	4	0	0.0	0	1	24	0	24	1	0	0	0	0
