= Reno Bound =

Single by Southern Pacific

from the album Southern Pacific
- B-side: "Someone's Gonna Love Me Tonight"
- Released: April 19, 1986
- Genre: Country rock, western swing, rockabilly
- Length: 3:24
- Label: Warner Bros.
- Songwriter(s): John McFee, Andre Pessis
- Producer(s): Jim Ed Norman, Southern Pacific, Brad Hartman

Southern Pacific singles chronology
"Perfect Stranger" (1985)	"Reno Bound" (1986)	"A Girl Like Emmylou" (1986)

"Reno Bound" is a song written by John McFee and Andre Pessis, and recorded by American country music group Southern Pacific. It was released in April 1986 as the third single from the album Southern Pacific. The song reached number 9 on the Billboard Hot Country Singles & Tracks chart.

== Personnel ==
- Keith Knudsen – drums, percussion, background vocals
- John McFee – lead guitar, harmonica, background vocals
- Tim Goodman – lead vocals, rhythm guitar, synthesizer
- Glen D. Hardin – piano, synthesizer, background vocals
- Jerry Scheff – bass guitar, background vocals

== Chart performance ==
Chart (1986)	Peak position
US Hot Country Songs (Billboard)	9
Canadian RPM Country Tracks	19
