= Dennis Robbins =

American musician

- Born: Dennis Anthony Robbins; August 23, 1949 (age 77); Hazelwood, North Carolina, U.S.
- Genres: Country; Rock
- Occupation: Singer-songwriter
- Instruments: Vocals electric guitar slide guitar acoustic guitar
- Years active: 1978–1994
- Labels: NSD; MCA; Reprise; Giant
- Formerly of: The Rockets, Billy Hill

Dennis Anthony Robbins (born August 23, 1949) is an American musician who first made himself known as a guitarist in the band Rockets. After his departure from The Rockets, he began a career in country music, recording three major-label albums and several singles of his own, in addition to writing hit singles for Highway 101, Shenandoah and Garth Brooks.

== Biography ==
Robbins was born in Hazelwood, North Carolina on August 23, 1949. He learned to play guitar while in his teens, taking his influences from both rock & roll and bluegrass. After a brief stint in the United States Marine Corps, he moved to Detroit, Michigan, where he found work in several bands before joining a group known as Rockets.

After retiring from Rockets, Robbins moved to Nashville, Tennessee, where he was signed to MCA in 1986, recording his debut album The First of Me that year. Later the same year, he founded the supergroup Billy Hill with songwriters Bob DiPiero and John Scott Sherrill. This group recorded one album on Reprise Records and charted three singles before disbanding in 1990. The three members of Billy Hill also co-wrote "The Church on Cumberland Road", a Number One single for Shenandoah in early 1989, and Highway 101's "(Do You Love Me) Just Say Yes."

== Solo career & Billy Hill ==
After retiring from Rockets, Robbins moved to Nashville, Tennessee, where he was signed to MCA in 1986, recording his debut album The First of Me that year. Later, as success was starting to lack on him, he founded the supergroup Billy Hill with songwriters Bob DiPiero and John Scott Sherrill. This group recorded one album on Reprise Records and charted three singles before disbanding in 1990. The three members of Billy Hill also co-wrote "The Church on Cumberland Road", a Number One single for Shenandoah in early 1989, and Highway 101's "(Do You Love Me) Just Say Yes."

Giant Records, a subsidiary label of Warner, opened a country music branch in 1990, and Robbins was the first act signed to this newly formed division. Also that year, he contributed to another Number One single, when Garth Brooks topped the country music charts with "Two of a Kind, Workin' on a Full House" (which Robbins himself had charted with three years previous).

Robbins' second album overall, Man with a Plan, was issued in 1992. Included on it was the single "Home Sweet Home", his only solo Top 40 hit on the country charts. Also found on this album was his own rendition of "I Am Just a Rebel" (which was later cut by both Confederate Railroad and Joy Lynn White), as well as the track "Paris, Tennessee", which was later cut by both Kenny Chesney and Tracy Lawrence. In 1993, he was named one of the New Faces of Country Music by the Country Radio Seminar.

A second album for Giant, Born Ready, was issued in 1994, producing one more chart single "Mona Lisa On Cruise Control" (#68). He has not recorded any more albums ever since.

== Songwriting ==
A few other of Robbins' penned material were later cut by other artists, such as: "Finally Friday" was recorded by Earl Thomas Conley on his 1988 album The Heart of It All and also by George Jones on his 1992 album Walls Can Fall.

"No Chance To Dance" was first cut by Johnny Rodriguez in 1988 for his album Gracias and his version was released as a single in early 1989, but it peaked at No. 72 on the Billboard country singles chart. Then, Robbins later cut the song along with the co-writers of the song (Bob DiPiero and John Scott Sherrill) when they formed Billy Hill and it was released as a single in 1990, but their version didn't reach the charts. And then Highway 101 recorded the song in 1993 for their album The New Frontier, but their version wasn't released as a single.

"Too Much Month at the End of the Money" was originally cut by Robbins when he formed the band Billy Hill, it peaked at No. 25 on Billboard in 1989 and it was later cut by Marty Stuart on his 2003 album Country Music, and he too would release it as a single where it would at No. 54.

The Church on Cumberland Road was first recorded by Robbins in 1987, which served as the B-side to his MCA single Two of a Kind, Workin' on a Full House, which would later become a No. 1 hit for Garth Brooks, Cumberland Road would later become a No. 1 hit for the band Shenandoah in 1989.

== Discography ==
=== Albums ===
| Title | Album details |
|---|---|
| The First of Me | Release date: May 5, 1986; Label: MCA Records |
| Man with a Plan | Release date: June 16, 1992; Label: Giant Records |
| Born Ready | Release date: July 19, 1994; Label: Giant Records |

=== Singles ===
| Year | Single | Peak chart positions | | Album |
| Year | Single | US Country | CAN Country | Album |
|---|---|---|---|---|
| 1983 | "If I Could Get Over You" | — | — | —N/a |
| 1986 | "Hard Lovin' Man" | — | — | The First of Me |
| 1986 | "The First of Me" | — | — | The First of Me |
| 1987 | "Long Gone Lonesome Blues" | 63 | — | —N/a |
| 1987 | "Two of a Kind (Workin' on a Full House)" | 71 | — | —N/a |
| 1992 | "Home Sweet Home" | 34 | 73 | Man With a Plan |
| 1992 | "My Side of Town" | 59 | — | Man With a Plan |
| 1992 | "Good News, Bad News" | — | — | Man With a Plan |
| 1993 | "Looking for a Thing Called Love" | — | — | Born Ready |
| 1994 | "Mona Lisa on Cruise Control" | 68 | — | Born Ready |
| 1994 | "Travelin' Music" | — | — | Born Ready |
"—" denotes releases that did not chart

=== Music videos ===
| Year | Video | Director |
|---|---|---|
| 1992 | "Home Sweet Home" | Roger Pistole |
| 1992 | "My Side of Town" | |
| 1993 | "Looking for a Thing Called Love" | |
| 1993 | "Mona Lisa on Cruise Control" | Marc Ball |

== Chart Singles written by Dennis Robbins ==
The following is a list of Dennis Robbins compositions that were chart hits.

| Year | Single Title | Recording Artist | Chart Positions | | |
| Year | Single Title | Recording Artist | Billboard Country | Billboard Hot 100 | RPM Country |
|---|---|---|---|---|---|
| 1980 | Desire co-written with John Badanjek | The Rockets | | 70 | |
| 1988 | (Do You Love Me) Just Say Yes co-written with Bob DiPiero and John Scott Sherrill | Highway 101 | 1 | | 1 |
| 1989 | The Church on Cumberland Road co-written with Bob DiPiero and John Scott Sherrill | Shenandoah | 1 | | 1 |
| 1989 | No Chance to Dance co-written with Bob DiPiero and John Scott Sherrill | Johnny Rodriguez | 72 | | |
| 1989 | Too Much Month at the End of the Money co-written with Bob DiPiero and John Scott Sherrill | Billy Hill | 25 | | |
| 1990 | Nickel to My Name co-written with Bob DiPiero and John Scott Sherrill | Billy Hill | | | 76 |
| 1991 | Two of a Kind, Workin' on a Full House co-written with Warren Haynes and Bobby Boyd | Garth Brooks | 1 | | 1 |
| 1998 | When You Get to Be You co-written with Curtis Wright and Michael Dan Ehmig | Lisa Brokop | 64 | | 57 |
| 2003 | Too Much Month (At the End of the Money) co-written with Bob DiPiero and John Scott Sherrill | Marty Stuart and the Fabulous Superlatives | 54 | | |
