= Billy Hill (band) =

American country music group

- Origin: Nashville, Tennessee, U.S.
- Genres: Country, country rock
- Years active: 1989–1990
- Label: Reprise
- Past members: Bob DiPiero; Reno Kling; Martin Parker; Dennis Robbins; John Scott Sherrill

Billy Hill was an American country music group founded by singer/songwriter/guitarists Dennis Robbins, Bob DiPiero and John Scott Sherrill, along with Reno Kling (bass guitar) and Martin Parker (drums). Before the group's foundation, Robbins had been a member of The Rockets, and Kling played bass for Steve Earle. Sherrill and Robbins alternated as lead vocalists, but credited the frontman role to a fictional character named Billy Hill and wrote a biography on the character.

The band recorded one album for Reprise Records and charted two singles on the Billboard country charts. Their biggest hit was "Too Much Month at the End of the Money" which reached No. 25 on the Billboard country charts. After disbanding in 1990, Robbins became a solo artist for Giant. DiPiero and Sherrill have continued working as songwriters.

In 2003, Marty Stuart recorded "Too Much Month at the End of the Money" for his 2003 album Country Music; his version reached No. 54 on the Billboard country charts.

== Discography ==
=== Albums ===
Title	Album details	Peak positions
Title	Album details	US Country
I Am Just a Rebel	Release date: July 11, 1989; Label: Reprise Records; Producer: Billy Hill	55

=== Singles ===
Year	Single	Peak chart positions		Album
Year	Single	US Country	CAN Country	Album
1989	"Too Much Month at the End of the Money"	25	—	I Am Just a Rebel
1989	"I Can't Help Myself (Sugar Pie Honey Bunch)"	58	61	I Am Just a Rebel
1990	"Nickel to My Name"	—^{A}	76	I Am Just a Rebel
1990	"No Chance to Dance"	—	—	—N/a
1990	"Blue Angel"	—	—	—N/a
"—" denotes releases that did not chart

Notes:

- ^{A} "Nickel in My Name" did not chart on Hot Country Songs, but peaked at No. 10 on Hot Country Radio Breakouts.

=== Guest singles ===
Year	Single	Artist	Peak positions	Album
Year	Single	Artist	US Country	Album
1990	"Tomorrow's World"	Various artists	74	—N/a
