= Tim Goodman =

American singer-songwriter

- Also known as: Tim Goodman
- Born: Timothy Goodman; June 3, 1950 (age 76)
- Origin: Toledo, Ohio, United States
- Genres: Country, folk, folk rock, Outlaw country, jam, bluegrass
- Occupations: Singer, songwriter
- Instruments: Vocals, guitar
- Years active: 1972–present
- Labels: Warner Brothers, RCA, Columbia
- Website: Official Website for Tim Goodman's current group, Magic Music Band

Timothy Goodman (born September 10, 1950) is an American country music singer-songwriter, guitarist, vocalist and producer who has recorded for RCA, Columbia Records and Warner Brothers and performed on numerous sessions for other recording artists.

Goodman was born in Toledo, Ohio in 1950 and briefly spent his high school years attending the American School in London. Upon returning to San Francisco, Goodman began touring and performing during the late 1970s, becoming a mainstay in the genres of Country, country rock and Bluegrass music. Goodman was a regular on the country music touring circuit in California, Colorado, Texas, New Mexico and Arizona.

Goodman released the solo album "Footsteps" for Columbia in 1981. This album was produced by guitarist John McFee of The Doobie Brothers and also included keyboardist Sean Hopper of Huey Lewis and the News, vocalist/keyboardist Michael MacDonald and drummer Keith Knudsen from The Doobie Brothers. During this time, Goodman also made several studio and live recordings with New Grass Revival, a progressive bluegrass band which featured notable musicians Béla Fleck and Sam Bush. These collaborations featured Tim Goodman on vocals and led to numerous live performances with the group.

== Southern Pacific ==
Goodman co-founded the country-rock band Southern Pacific in 1983 with guitarist John McFee and drummer Keith Knudsen, both of The Doobie Brothers, and bassist Jerry Scheff and keyboardist Glen Hardin, both of Elvis Presley's TCB Band. They signed with Warner Bros. Records in 1984. Their debut album Southern Pacific was released the following year. In 1986, Southern Pacific released the album "Killbilly Hill," which featured country-rock oriented cover versions of Bruce Springsteen's 'Pink Cadillac' and the Tom Petty song 'Thing About You,' a duet with Emmylou Harris, in which she and Goodman shared vocal duties. Southern Pacific then performed at Farm Aid on September 22, 1985, with Bob Dylan, Tom Petty, Bon Jovi, Roy Orbison, Lou Reed, John Fogerty, Merle Haggard, Neil Young and Willie Nelson. Southern Pacific was named New Country Group of the Year when they debuted and have been honored by having their name added to the Country Music Association's Walkway of Stars in Nashville, Tennessee.

After an extensive world tour as an opening act with Neil Young, Goodman parted ways with Southern Pacific after the second album and formed The Tim Goodman Band. The Tim Goodman Band gave Goodman more freedom to focus on writing and recording Bluegrass music. As a solo act with his own band, Tim Goodman continued to tour and perform live at clubs and music festivals including the annual Telluride Bluegrass Festival in Telluride, Colorado, with longtime friends Emmylou Harris and John Prine.

== Magic Music Band ==
Goodman currently tours and records with Magic Music Band, a long-running country-rock band which Goodman originally co-founded during the 1970s with Will Luckey. Goodman and Luckey had been childhood friends and developed an interest in music while attending boarding school together in Martha's Vineyard, Massachusetts. Magic Music Band formed in Boulder, Colorado and performed with an impressive list of similar acts including Old & In the Way, Grateful Dead, New Grass Revival, Jackson Browne, New Riders of the Purple Sage and Nitty Gritty Dirt Band.

Magic Music Band represented the acoustic music movement of the early 1970s, also associated with James Taylor, Crosby Stills Nash & Young, Old & In The Way, and Pentangle. Formed in 1970, the band's celebrated highlights included performances at Tulagi on Hill, Ebbets Field, the 2nd and 3rd Telluride Bluegrass Festival, The Denver Folklore Center, touring with Navarro ( from Carole King's band), and playing shows with David Bromberg, The Nitty Gritty Dirt Band, Cat Stevens, The Youngbloods, Michael Martin Murphey, Doc Watson, and others. Magic Music played their last gig in 1976 at The Blue River in Breckenridge, Colorado. During the early period of their career, the band was living in the mountains above Boulder in school buses, tee pees, and even a doughnut truck, Magic Music wrote a sizable amount of material, in between opening for many famous acts of the time on shows produced by Barry Fey and Chuck Morris.

Currently, Magic Music Band are preparing to release a new studio album which was produced by Goodman and recorded in Los Angeles in 2015 at East West Studios. These sessions feature original members Tim Goodman, Will Luckey, Chris Daniels, George Cahill, Tommy Major and Jimmy Haslip, founding member of The Yellowjackets. The album also features numerous special guests including Sam Bush of New Grass Revival, Bob Dylan's fiddle player Scarlet Rivera and The Doobie Brothers' guitarist John McFee, formerly of Southern Pacific.
