= Bob DiPiero =

American songwriter (born 1951)

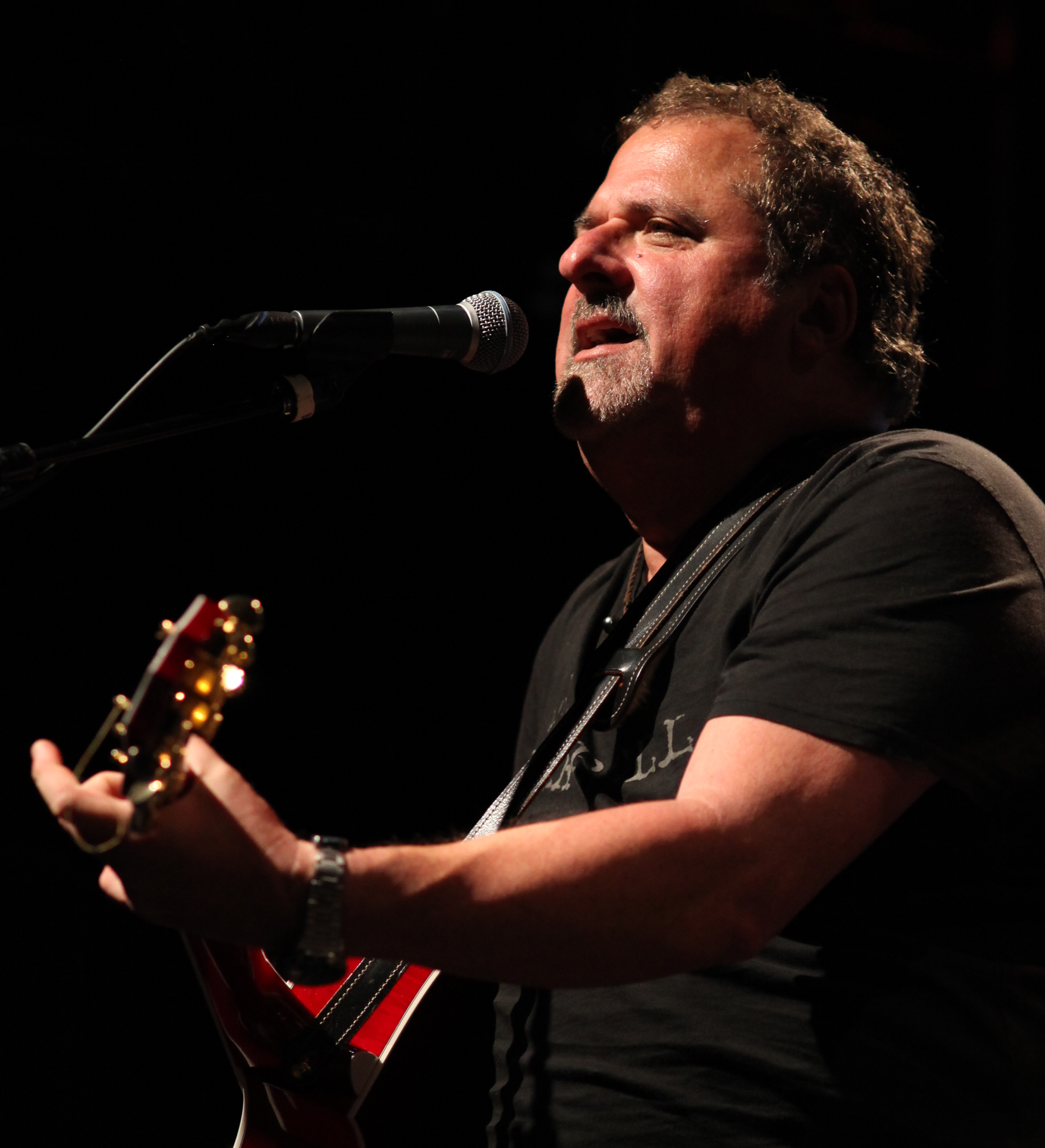
- DiPiero performing at the CMA Songwriters' Series in 2014

Background information
- Born: Robert John DiPiero
- Origin: March 3, 1951 (age 75); Youngstown, Ohio, U.S.
- Genre: Country
- Occupation: Songwriter
- Years active: 1983–present
- Formerly of: Billy Hill
- Spouse: Pam Tillis (m. 1991; div. 1998)

Robert John DiPiero (born March 3, 1951) is an American country music songwriter. He has written 15 US number one hits and several Top 20 singles for Tim McGraw, The Oak Ridge Boys, Reba McEntire, Vince Gill, Faith Hill, Shenandoah, Neal McCoy, Highway 101, Restless Heart, Ricochet, John Anderson, Montgomery Gentry, Brooks & Dunn, George Strait, Pam Tillis, Martina McBride, Trace Adkins, Travis Tritt, Bryan White, Billy Currington, Etta James, Delbert McClinton, Van Zant, Tanya Tucker, Patty Loveless, and many others.

== Early life ==
DiPiero was born in the steel-manufacturing center of Youngstown, Ohio. His family moved to the suburban township of Liberty, Ohio. DiPiero graduated from Liberty High School in 1969. He graduated from Youngstown State University's Dana School of Music. He participated in hard rock bands in northeastern Ohio throughout the late 1960s and 1970s. In 1979, DiPiero moved to Nashville. He worked as a session player and traveling musician, then moved into songwriting.

== Career ==
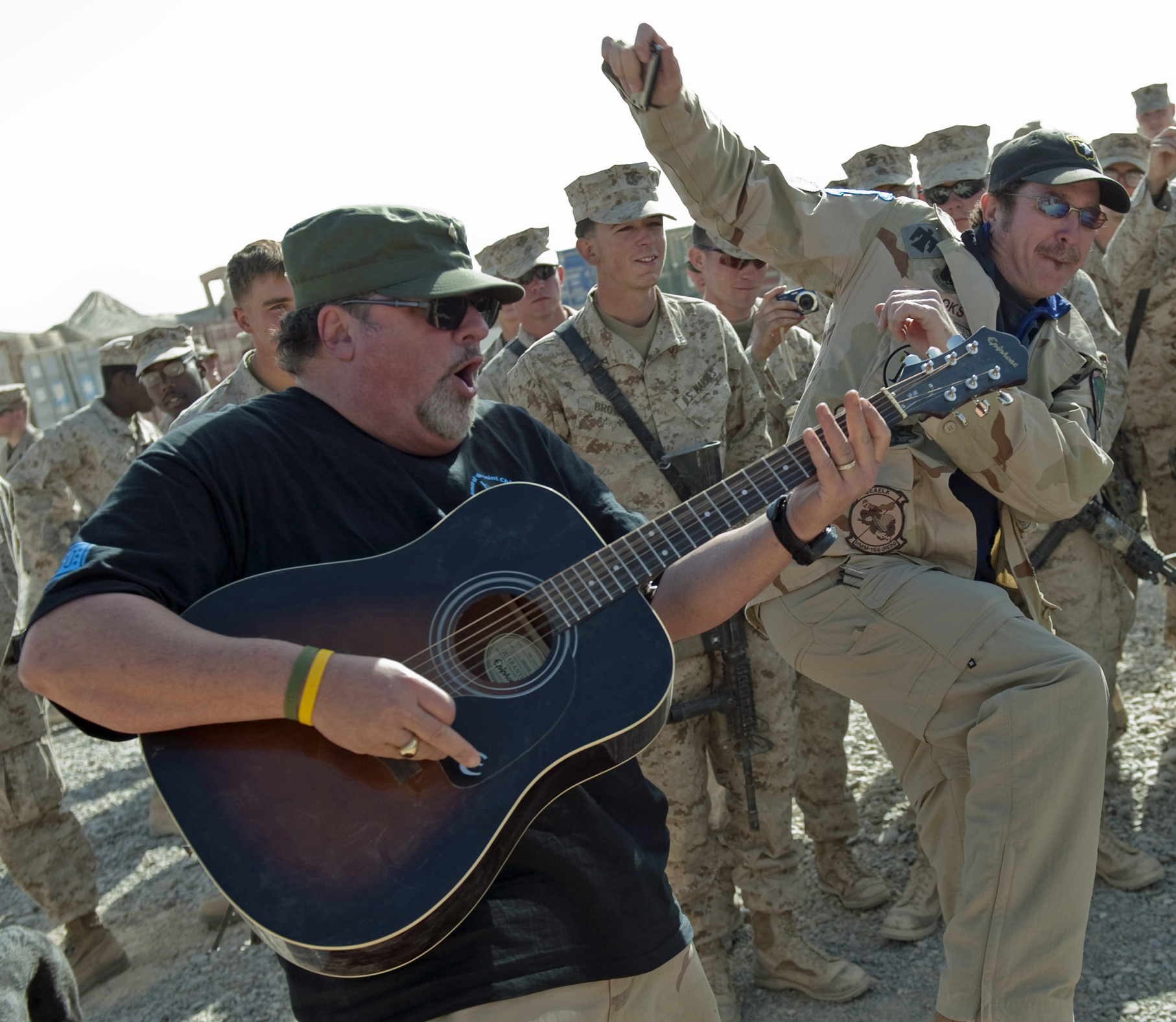
DiPiero performing with Kix Brooks for U.S. troops in Afghanistan on behalf of the USO in December 2010

DiPiero's first number one hit as a songwriter was 1983's "American Made" by The Oak Ridge Boys; it also became a national advertisements jingle for Miller Beer and Baby Ruth candybar. Since then, DiPiero co-wrote countless hit singles for other country music artists, with 15 of his songs reaching No. 1 on the country music charts. In 1995 and 1996, he received the Triple Play award from the Country Music Association for 3 number one singles charted in each of those years. In addition, he has 36 awards from BMI for his contributions as a songwriter. He was also one third of the country music supergroup Billy Hill; members included Dennis Robbins and John Scott Sherrill.

He helped make Nashville a port-of-call for legendary performers from all genres, writing with Neil Diamond, Carole King, Johnny Van Zant, and Delbert McClinton, among many others.

DiPiero launched a music industry-based reality series called "The Hitmen of Music Row" premiering September 26, 2007, on the Great American Country cable station. Songwriter participants in the series include Tony Mullins, Jeffrey Steele, and Craig Wiseman.

== Personal life ==
At one point, DiPiero was married to country music artist Pam Tillis, the daughter of singer Mel Tillis. The couple divorced. In June 2006, he married music publisher Leslie Tomasino.

== Awards ==
- 1984: Music City News Top Country Hit of the Year- "American Made-The Oak Ridge Boys"
- 1990: NSAI Award for Superior Creativity-"The Church On Cumberland Road-Shenandoah"
- 1993: NSAI Award for Superior Creativity-"Cleopatra, Queen of Denial-Pam Tillis"
- 1994: The Songwriters Guild Of America in recognition of the success of the hit song "Wink-Neal McCoy"
- 1994: NSAI Award for Superior Creativity-"Walking Away A Winner-Kathy Mattea"
- 1995: CMA Triple Play Award (Three No. 1 songs in a 12-month period) "Wink-Neal McCoy," "Take Me As I Am-Faith Hill," Till You Love Me-Reba McEntire"
- 1995: BMI Robert J. Burton Award Most Performed Country Song of the Year-"Wink-Neal McCoy"
- 1996: CMA Triple Play Award (Three No. 1 songs in a 12-month period) "Blue Clear Sky-George Strait," "Daddy's Money-Ricochet," "World's Apart-Vince Gill"
- 1997: Country Music Radio Awards – Song of the Year ("Worlds Apart" by Vince Gill)
- 1998: Nashville Music Awards – Songwriter of the Year
- 2000: Sony / A TV, Nashville – Songwriter of the Year.
- 2001: BMI 50 Most Performed Songs of the Year
- 2004: BMI 50 Most Performed Songs of the Year-"Cowboy's Like Us-George Strait" "You Can't Take The Honky Tonk Out Of The Girl-Brooks & Dunn"
- 2005: BMI Most Performed Songs of the Year-"Gone-Montgomery Gentry," "If You Ever Stop Loving Me-Montgomery Gentry"
- 2006: BMI 50 Most Performed Songs of the Year-"She Don't Tell Me To-Montgomery Gentry"
- 2007: Nashville Songwriters Hall of Fame inductee
- 2007: Nashville Walk of Fame inductee
- 2010: 17 Million-Air Honors (BMI)
- 2017: BMI Icon

== Singles written or co-written by Bob DiPiero ==
- 1983 "American Made" – The Oak Ridge Boys
- 1983 "Sentimental Ol' You" – Charly McClain
- 1986 "That Rock Won't Roll" – Restless Heart
- 1986 "The First Of Me" - Dennis Robbins
- 1986 "Little Rock" – Reba McEntire
- 1988 "(Do You Love Me) Just Say Yes" – Highway 101
- 1989 "No Chance To Dance" - Johnny Rodriguez
- 1989 "The Church on Cumberland Road" – Shenandoah
- 1989 "Too Much Month at the End of the Money" - Billy Hill
- 1990 "Nickel To My Name" - Billy Hill
- 1990 "No Chance To Dance" - Billy Hill
- 1990 "Blue Angel" - Billy Hill
- 1992 "Anywhere but Here" – Sammy Kershaw
- 1992 "Blue Rose Is" – Pam Tillis
- 1992 "Mirror, Mirror" – Diamond Rio
- 1992 "Home Sweet Home" - Dennis Robbins
- 1992 "My Side Of Town" - Dennis Robbins
- 1992 "Good News, Bad News" - Dennis Robbins
- 1993 "Money in the Bank" – John Anderson
- 1993 "Cleopatra, Queen of Denial" – Pam Tillis
- 1994 "Kiss Me, I'm Gone" – Marty Stuart
- 1994 "Take Me as I Am" – Faith Hill
- 1994 "Wink" – Neal McCoy
- 1994 "Till You Love Me" – Reba McEntire
- 1994 "Walking Away a Winner" – Kathy Mattea
- 1995 "They're Playin' Our Song" – Neal McCoy
- 1995 "Should've Asked Her Faster" – Ty England
- 1996 "Blue Clear Sky" – George Strait
- 1996 "It's Lonely Out There" – Pam Tillis
- 1996 "Love You Back" – Rhett Akins
- 1996 "Daddy's Money" – Ricochet
- 1996 "See Rock City" – Rick Trevino
- 1996 "Do You Wanna Make Something of It" – Jo Dee Messina
- 1997 "Worlds Apart" – Vince Gill
- 1998 "Bad Day to Let You Go" – Bryan White
- 1998 "Poor Me" – Joe Diffie
- 1998 "The Other Side of This Kiss" – Mindy McCready
- 1999 "Give My Heart to You" – Billy Ray Cyrus
- 1999 "Ordinary Love" – Shane Minor
- 2000 "There You Are" – Martina McBride
- 2000 "We're So Good Together" – Reba McEntire
- 2003 "Cowboys Like Us" – George Strait
- 2003 "I'll Take Love Over Money" – Aaron Tippin
- 2003 "You Can't Take the Honky Tonk Out of the Girl" – Brooks & Dunn
- 2003 "Too Much Month (At the End of the Money)" – Marty Stuart and His Fabulous Superlatives
- 2004 "If You Ever Stop Loving Me" – Montgomery Gentry
- 2004 "The Girl's Gone Wild" – Travis Tritt
- 2005 "Gone" – Montgomery Gentry
- 2005 "Hillbilly Nation" – Cowboy Crush
- 2005 "So Good for So Long" – Beccy Cole (Feel This Free)
- 2005 "XXL" – Keith Anderson
- 2006 "Local Girls" – Ronnie Milsap
- 2006 "She Don't Tell Me To" – Montgomery Gentry
- 2006 "Tennessee Girl" – Sammy Kershaw
- 2009 "Indian Summer" – Brooks & Dunn
- 2009 "Southern Voice" – Tim McGraw
- 2010 "From a Table Away" – Sunny Sweeney
- 2012 "Lovin' You Is Fun" – Easton Corbin
- 2012 "It's My Life" – Connie Britton
- 2014 "Drunk Americans" - Toby Keith
- 2014 "Headlights" – Montgomery Gentry
- 2015 "Boys Like You" – Who Is Fancy featuring Meghan Trainor and Ariana Grande
- 2018 "Tacoma" cowritten with Caitlin Smith, also performed by Garth Brooks
- 2020 "Me About Me" – RaeLynn
