= John Scott Sherrill =

American songwriter

- Origin: Nashville
- Genres: Country
- Occupation: Songwriter
- Years active: 1982–present
- Labels: Portrait; Reprise
- Formerly of: Billy Hill

John Scott Sherrill is an American songwriter whose work is primarily in the field of country music. His brother, Donn Sherrill, was a student at Vanderbilt, where he introduced John Scott to his fraternity brother, Scott Siman, who recorded demos of his music. He pitched the music to Bob Beckham at Combine Music, and Beckham signed him to a worldwide publishing deal. He also got a record deal with Portrait Records in the early 1980s and released a few solo singles of his own.

He has written songs for such artists as John Anderson, Brooks & Dunn, Jimmy Buffett, Johnny Lee, George Strait, Steve Wariner, Patty Loveless, Josh Turner, Waylon Jennings, Alison Krauss, Peter Wolf, Mick Jagger, Michael McDonald and Willie Nelson and Kris Kristofferson. He is the son of Christian writers John and Elizabeth Sherrill. In the 1980s, Sherrill recorded on Reprise Records with Bob DiPiero and Dennis Robbins as the band Billy Hill.

== Discography ==
=== Singles ===
Year	Single	Peak positions
Year	Single	US Country
1982	"Out of the Blue"	—
1982	"Some Fools Never Learn"	—
"—" denotes releases that did not chart

== Awards and nominations ==
=== Academy of Country Music Awards ===
Year	Nominee / work	Award	Result
1986	"Some Fools Never Learn"^{[A]}	Song of the Year	Nominated
2007	"Would You Go with Me"^{[B]}	Song of the Year	Nominated

^[A] Nominated alongside recording artist Steve Wariner
^[B] Nominated alongside co-writer Shawn Camp and recording artist Josh Turner
