= The Psychedelic World of the 13th Floor Elevators =

2002 compilation album by the 13th Floor Elevators

Box set by The 13th Floor Elevators
- Released: 2002
- Genre: Psychedelic rock; garage rock; acid rock
- Label: Charly Records
- Producer: Various

Professional ratings
Review scores
Source	Rating
Allmusic	4/5 stars

The Psychedelic World of the 13th Floor Elevators is a 3 disc box set by the American rock band the 13th Floor Elevators. The set collects the band's studio output, with live cuts, alternate versions, and the two original singles as The Spades.

== Track listing ==
=== CD 1 ===
1. You're Gonna Miss Me
2. Roller Coaster
3. Splash 1
4. Reverbation (Doubt)
5. Don't Fall Down
6. Fire Engine
7. Thru the Rhythm
8. You Don't Know
9. Kingdom of Heaven
10. Monkey Island
11. Tried to Hide
12. Everybody Needs Somebody to Love
13. Before You Accuse Me
14. You Don't Know
15. I'm Gonna Love You Too
16. You Really Got Me
17. Splash 1
18. Fire Engine
19. Roll Over Beethoven
20. The Word
21. Monkey Island
22. Roller Coaster

Tracks 1–11 are The Psychedelic Sounds of the 13th Floor Elevators. Tracks 12–22 were recorded live in San Francisco, 1966.

=== CD 2 ===
1. Slip Inside This House
2. Slide Machine
3. She Lives (In a Time of Her Own)
4. Nobody to Love
5. Baby Blue
6. Earthquake
7. Dust
8. Levitation
9. I Had to Tell You
10. Pictures (Leave Your Body Behind)
11. Splash 1
12. Kingdom of Heaven
13. You're Gonna Miss Me
14. She Lives (In a Time of Her Own)
15. Reverbation
16. You're Gonna Miss Me
17. We Sell Soul
18. Fire in My Bones
19. Levitation Blues (Instrumental)
20. Slip Inside This House (Single Edited Version)

Tracks 1–10 were released in 1967 as Easter Everywhere. Track 10 was listed as "Postures (Leave Your Body Behind)" on Easter Everywhere. Tracks 11–15 were recorded live in Texas, 1967 and released ten years later. Tracks 16 and 17 are 1965-released single sides by The Spades. Track 18 was unreleased until 1991's "Unreleased Masters" compilation was made available. Track 19 appeared on the expanded version of Easter Everywhere titled "Levitation (Instrumental)".

=== CD 3 ===
1. Before You Accuse Me
2. She Lives in a Time of Her Own
3. Tried to Hide
4. You Gotta Take That Girl
5. I'm Gonna Love You Too
6. Everybody Needs Somebody to Love
7. I've Got Levitation
8. You Can't Hurt Me Anymore
9. Roller Coaster
10. You're Gonna Miss Me
11. Livin' On
12. Barnyard Blues
13. Till Then
14. Never Another
15. Rose and the Thorn
16. Down by the River
17. Scarlet and Gold
18. Street Song
19. Doctor Doom
20. With You
21. May the Circle Remain Unbroken
22. Wait for My Love
23. Splash
24. Right Track Now
25. Radio Spot for Bull of the Woods Album.

Tracks 1–10 are from the album Live. Tracks 11–21 are from the album Bull of the Woods. Tracks 23 and 24 are by Roky Erickson & Clementine Hall.

== See also ==
- The Psychedelic Sounds of the 13th Floor Elevators
- Easter Everywhere
- Red Krayola
