= Slip Inside This House =

1967 song by the 13th Floor Elevators

Single by the 13th Floor Elevators

from the album Easter Everywhere
- B-side: "Splash 1"
- Released: November 1967
- Recorded: September 1967
- Genre: Acid rock; psychedelic rock
- Length: 8:03 (album version); 3:53 (single version)
- Label: International Artists
- Songwriters: Roky Erickson; Tommy Hall
- Producer: Lelan Rogers

"Slip Inside This House" is a song originally released by the psychedelic rock band the 13th Floor Elevators as the first track on their 1967 sophomore album Easter Everywhere. At 8:03 in length, it is the longest track the band released on a studio album; a single version edited to just under four minutes was released by International Artists.

The song contains many of the band's distinct musical elements, including the electric jug of Tommy Hall, a repetitive fuzz guitar riff, and impassioned vocals by Roky Erickson. Lyricist Hall attempted to express many of his philosophical influences in the song, including elements of Eastern religions, Christian mysticism, general semantics, and the ideas of mystic George Gurdjieff.

"Slip Inside This House" has been covered by Scottish alternative rock band Primal Scream on their album Screamadelica, by Norwegian band Madrugada, by New York noise rock band Oneida on their album Come on Everybody Let's Rock, and by Scottish electronic band the Shamen on a 1992 promo for "Make It Mine". In a 2019 Pitchfork interview, Stephen Malkmus deemed it "a song I wish I wrote."
