= Ray Rush =

American songwriter and record producer

Ray Rush is an American songwriter and record producer. After early collaborations with Buddy Holly and Roy Orbison, Rush moved into producing and promoting records of Texas musicians.

== Music career ==
Rush's music career began while a student at Odessa College, where he sang in a trio called the Roses, serving as a backup vocals on "Think It Over" by Buddy Holly in 1958. The Roses accompanied Holly and his band to New York in support of the song. Rush and the Roses sang backup vocals on other Crickets songs, such as "Wild One", ( a.k.a. ' Real Wild Child '), in 1958. Rush was promotions manager of an early recording and publishing company formed by Holly, Prism Records.

Rush introduced Roy Orbison to Joe Melson, one of Orbison's most important early collaborators. Rush co-wrote "Mama" in 1962 with Orbison.

Rush was one of the founders of Zenith Productions. From 1966 to 1968, Zenith was in litigation with Scepter Records in a contractual dispute over B. J. Thomas. Zenith had recorded one of Thomas's early singles, and claimed contractual interference. Zenith settled in 1968 for $7,500, and Thomas signed with Scepter.

In 1968, Rush was hired by International Artists to revamp their operation. Rush produced several psychedelic rock albums with International Artists in the late 1960s, including The Thirteenth Floor Elevators', Bull of the Woods, and songs by Bubble Puppy in 1969. Rush produced records and also managed artists and repertoire with International.

== Singles discography ==
- A: "So What" / B: "Can This Be Love" (1962)
- A: "Lucky Star" / B: "A Hole in My Rockin' Shoes" (1963)
