= The Psychedelic Sounds of the 13th Floor Elevators =

1966 album by the 13th Floor Elevators

Studio album by the 13th Floor Elevators
- Released: October 17, 1966
- Recorded: January 3 – October 11, 1966
- Studios: Sumet Sound, Dallas
- Genres: Psychedelic rock; garage rock; acid rock; R&B
- Length: 34:31
- Label: International Artists
- Producer: Lelan Rogers

The 13th Floor Elevators chronology
The Psychedelic Sounds of the 13th Floor Elevators (1966)	Easter Everywhere (1967)

Singles from The Psychedelic Sounds of the 13th Floor Elevators
- 1. "You're Gonna Miss Me" / "Tried to Hide" Released: January 1966; 2. "Reverberation (Doubt)" / "Fire Engine" Released: 31 October 1966

The Psychedelic Sounds of the 13th Floor Elevators is the debut studio album by the American psychedelic rock band the 13th Floor Elevators. The album showcases the earliest known use of the word "psychedelic" on an album title.

The album is notable for Roky Erickson, along with Tommy Hall's use of an electric jug as featured on the band's only hit, "You're Gonna Miss Me", which reached number 55 on the Billboard Hot 100 with "Tried to Hide" as a B-side. Another single from the album, "Reverberation (Doubt)", reached number 129 on the Billboard's Bubbling Under chart.

== Background ==
The album showcases the earliest known use of the word "psychedelic" on an album title. Additionally, the band used the term "psychedelic rock" on business cards from January 1966. The album was followed by releases from New York acts such as the Deep's Psychedelic Moods and Blues Magoos' Psychedelic Lollipop in November that same year.

In 2009, the original mono version was released as part of the "Sign of the 3-Eyed Men" box set. The set also featured a new, alternate stereo version which retained the band's original intended track listing, as well as false starts on some of the tracks (the International Artists label had altered the track listing without the band's consent when the album was first released). Both versions on the box set featured different bonus tracks, some that were previously unreleased.

== Music and lyrics ==
The album contains elements of garage rock and R&B, and its overall mood is described as "skewed". The tracks are described as exhibiting a "dark, eerie quality." The vocals of Roky Erickson have been likened to "banshee wailing," and have been described as sounding like "yelp[ing] and [howling] like a man possessed." According to Stephen M. Deusner of Pitchfork, "Erickson's wild-man vocals create an atmosphere where unfettered mayhem reigns." Tommy Hall's amplified jug sounds are described as "alien." Deusner said that Hall "provided the psychedelic sound that evokes the chemical weightlessness of a trip. It's the wiggedly-wiggedly of a dream sequence, the sound of your hands melting or of a dimensional door squeaking open [...] [translated] into an aural sensation."

Mark Deming of AllMusic said: "while the sensuous twists of the melodies and the charming psychobabble of the lyrics make it sound like these folks were indulging in something stronger than Pearl Beer, at this point the Elevators sounded like a smarter-than-average folk-rock band with a truly uncommon level of intensity." Music historian Jeff Gold said the album is "roaring, intense [and] at times frightening," adding that it "does come close to conjuring the rollercoaster run of emotions of the drug trip." He described the tracks "Fire Engine" and "Reverberation" as "ominous", and the track "Splash 1" as "almost delicate". Pitchfork wrote: "Erickson's psychedelia was not passive aural wallpapers-- all pretty shapes and colors to listen to while tripping-- but an active force of social, musical, and psychological change."

The album's lyrics have been described as "spaced out," and Stephen M. Deusner of Pitchfork said the album's lyrics were "awash in narcotic philosophy." The lyrics to the song "Splash 1 (Now I'm Home)" reflect a mystical connection between Erickson and a woman, inspired by a meeting with Janis Joplin.

== Release ==
The song "Splash 1 (Now I'm Home)" was released in 1966 as a single from The Psychedelic Sounds of the 13th Floor Elevators. It was a minor regional hit in Texas but became a bigger (albeit still relatively minor) regional hit a year later when covered by the Clique. It has also been covered by Bongwater and The Mighty Lemon Drops.

== Artwork ==
The album's interior sleeve notes espouse the supposed benefits of psychedelic drug use. The album's back cover reads: "The quest for pure sanity... forms the basis of this songs on this album."

== Reception and legacy ==
Professional ratings
Review scores
Source	Rating
AllMusic	4.5/5 stars
Encyclopedia of Popular Music	4/5 stars
The Great Rock Discography	7/10
Pitchfork	9.1/10
Spin Alternative Record Guide	8/10

The album was included in Robert Dimery's 1001 Albums You Must Hear Before You Die.

In 2005, Pitchfork gave the album a score of 9.1 out of 10 in a retrospective review. Staff writer Stephen M. Deusner wrote: "What makes these songs so kick-ass is that it's the sound of someone going right off the page of the rock script-- like so many B-movie auteurs of the '60s, he's doing whatever he wants with no one to tell him that's not how it's done. As a result, very few of the songs on I Have Always Been Here Before depend for their impact on the listener's knowledge of Erickson's mental health at the time. This is perhaps the singer's true achievement, which this compilation generously spotlights: even when he was suffering, his strange music sounds wholly idiosyncratic and spiritually curious, the sound of a man who won't let the world's ugliness diminish his enjoyment of life or hinder his search for something solid and secure."

Ryan Bort of Paste wrote: "It’s hard to think of any one record that has influenced an entire genre as much as the 13th Floor Elevators’ seminal debut influenced psych rock. Since its release in 1966, countless bands have tried to imitate the album’s sound, and every psych-oriented group from The Jesus and Mary Chain to The Black Angels are in some way indebted to The Elevators and their visionary frontman Roky Erickson. Though they would continue to record and tour following the release of The Psychedelic Sounds..., nothing they did came remotely close to having the impact and ferocious psychedelic energy of their debut and its incendiary single and leadoff track, 'You’re Gonna Miss Me.'"

Mark Deming of AllMusic gave the album four and a half stars out of five. He wrote: "The 13th Floor Elevators were trailblazers in the psychedelic rock scene, and in time they'd pay a heavy price for exploring the outer edges of musical and psychological possibility, but along the way they left behind a few fine albums, and The Psychedelic Sounds of the 13th Floor Elevators remains a potent delight."

In 2026, Em Casalena of American Songwriter named the album one of "3 Psychedelic Rock Albums ... Undeniably Perfect From Start To Finish."

== Track listing ==
Side one
No.	Title	Writer(s)	Length
1.	"You're Gonna Miss Me"	Roky Erickson	2:24
2.	"Roller Coaster"	Erickson, Tommy Hall	5:00
3.	"Splash 1 (Now I'm Home)"	Erickson, Clementine Hall	3:50
4.	"Reverberation (Doubt)"	Erickson, T. Hall, Stacy Sutherland	2:46
5.	"Don't Fall Down"	T. Hall, Erickson	3:00

Side two
No.	Title	Writer(s)	Length
6.	"Fire Engine"	T. Hall, Sutherland, Erickson	3:22
7.	"Thru the Rhythm"	T. Hall, Sutherland	3:05
8.	"You Don't Know"	Powell St. John	2:38
9.	"Kingdom of Heaven"	St. John	3:05
10.	"Monkey Island"	St. John	2:38
11.	"Tried to Hide"	T. Hall, Sutherland	2:46
Total length:			34:31

2005 Charly Records bonus tracks
No.	Title	Writer(s)	Length
12.	"Everybody Needs Somebody to Love"	Bert Russell, Jerry Wexler, Solomon Burke	5:15
13.	"Before You Accuse Me"	Ellas McDaniel	2:33
14.	"I'm Gonna Love You Too"	Joe B. Mauldin, Niki Sullivan, Norman Petty	1:53
15.	"You Really Got Me"	Ray Davies	6:17
16.	"Roll Over Beethoven"	Chuck Berry	2:46
17.	"The Word"	John Lennon, Paul McCartney	2:49
18.	"Gloria"	Van Morrison	3:55
19.	"She Lives (In a Time of Her Own)"	Erickson, T. Hall	3:03
20.	"We Sell Soul"	Erickson	3:21
21.	"You're Gonna Miss Me"	Erickson	3:25

- Tracks 12–17 were recorded live at the Avalon in San Francisco, September 1966
- Tracks 18–19 were recorded live in Texas
- Tracks 20–21 were The Spades singles released in 1965

Original band track listing
No.	Title	Writer(s)	Length
1.	"You Don't Know (How Young You Are)"	St. John	2:38
2.	"Through the Rhythm"	T. Hall, Sutherland	3:05
3.	"Monkey Island"	St. John	2:38
4.	"Roller Coaster"	T. Hall, Erickson	5:00
5.	"Fire Engine"	T. Hall, Sutherland, Erickson	3:22
6.	"Reverberation (Doubt)"	T. Hall, Sutherland, Erickson	2:46
7.	"Tried to Hide" (false start)	T. Hall, Sutherland
8.	"Tried to Hide"	T. Hall, Sutherland	2:43
9.	"You're Gonna Miss Me"	Erickson	2:24
10.	"I've Seen Your Face Before (Splash 1)"	C. Hall, Erickson	3:50
11.	"Don't Fall Down"	T. Hall, Erickson	3:00
12.	"The Kingdom of Heaven (Is Within You)"	St. John	3:05

This version was included in the "Sign of the 3-Eyed Men" box set on CD 4 with the following bonus tracks.

No.	Title	Length
13.	"You Don't Know (How Young You Are)" (alternate backing track)
14.	"Roller Coaster" (alternate backing track)
15.	"Don't Fall Down" (alternate backing track)
16.	"Don't Fall Down / band introduction" (Larry Kane show)

== Personnel ==
- Roky Erickson – vocals, rhythm guitar, harmonica
- Stacy Sutherland – lead guitar
- Tommy Hall – amplified jug
- Benny Thurman – bass guitar (1, 3)
- Ronnie Leatherman – bass guitar (2, 4–11)
- John Ike Walton – drums, percussion

Production

- Produced by Lelan Rogers, except track 1 produced by Gordon Bynum
- Recorded, engineered and mixed by Bob Sullivan
- John Cleveland – cover design

== See also ==
- Nuggets: Original Artyfacts from the First Psychedelic Era, 1965–1968
