= Live (13th Floor Elevators album) =

1968 compilation album by the 13th Floor Elevators

Compilation album by The 13th Floor Elevators
- Released: August 1968
- Genre: Psychedelic rock; garage rock; blues rock; pop rock
- Length: 35:01
- Label: International Artists
- Producer: Lelan Rogers

The 13th Floor Elevators chronology
Easter Everywhere (1967)	Live (1968)	Bull of the Woods (1969)

Professional ratings
Review scores
Source	Rating
AllMusic	2.5/5 stars
Mass Media	favorable

Live is a compilation album by the American psychedelic rock band the 13th Floor Elevators, released in 1968. Despite being marketed as a live album, it is actually a compilation of studio outtakes with cheering and applause overdubbed.

The album is held in low regard and was put together by the International Artists label to make extra money with little to no input from the band.

At the time of its release it was hailed as "one of the finest releases of the year" in Mass Media. AllMusic gave it a two and a half stars rating, describing it as "an often laughable collection" but also noting that it contained "several excellent early performances".

== Track listing ==
1. "Before You Accuse Me" – (Ellas McDaniel) - 3:58
2. "She Lives (In a Time of Her Own)" – (Roky Erickson, Tommy Hall) - 3:09
3. "Tried to Hide" – (Stacy Sutherland, Tommy Hall) - 3:06
4. "You Gotta Take That Girl" – (Powell St. John) - 3:17
5. "I'm Gonna Love You Too" – (Norman Petty, Niki Sullivan, Joe B. Mauldin) - 2:10
6. "Everybody Needs Somebody to Love" – (Bert Russell, Jerry Wexler, Solomon Burke) - 4:10
7. "I've Got Levitation" – (Stacy Sutherland, Tommy Hall) - 2:58
8. "You Can't Hurt Me Anymore" – (Roky Erickson, Tommy Hall) - 4:03
9. "Roller Coaster" – (Roky Erickson, Tommy Hall) - 5:23
10. "You're Gonna Miss Me" – (Roky Erickson) - 2:33
