= Bull of the Woods =

1969 album by The 13th Floor Elevators

Studio album by The 13th Floor Elevators
- Released: March 21, 1969
- Recorded: 1968
- Genre: Psychedelic rock
- Length: 35:20
- Label: International Artists
- Producer: Ray Rush

The 13th Floor Elevators chronology
Live (1968)	Bull of the Woods (1969)

Professional ratings
Review scores
Source	Rating
AllMusic	3.5/5 stars

Bull of the Woods is the third and final studio album by the American psychedelic rock band The 13th Floor Elevators, and the last on which they worked as a group. The album is noted for its moody, dreamy, and fuzzed-out psychedelic sound, and was released by International Artists.

== Background ==
The album project commenced shortly after the completion of Easter Everywhere. It featured two bass players: the 1968 lineup of Roky Erickson, Stacy Sutherland, Tommy Hall, Danny Thomas, and Duke Davis was amended with Ronnie Leatherman replacing Davis on some tracks. The band was disintegrating while recording was taking place. Only four songs feature Roky Erickson and Duke Davis. The remaining seven tracks only feature Sutherland, Thomas, and Leatherman. Most of the tracks recorded early in 1968 were discarded and the album was completed later that year. Sutherland holds sole songwriting credits on five tracks, co-writing a further four with Tommy Hall. When it was released in March 1969 as Bull of the Woods the group had effectively disbanded.

In 2009, the album was released with bonus tracks as part of the "Sign of the 3-Eyed Men" box set. The set also included a reconstruction of the "lost" third album, A Love That's Sound, which consisted of mostly previously unreleased tracks, and early versions of songs later included on Bull of the Woods.

== Track listing ==
1. "Livin' On" (Stacy Sutherland, Tommy Hall) – 3:23
2. "Barnyard Blues" (Sutherland) – 2:52
3. "Til Then" (Sutherland, Hall) – 3:18
4. "Never Another" (Roky Erickson, Hall) – 2:27
5. "Rose and the Thorn" (Sutherland) – 3:40
6. "Down by the River" (Sutherland) – 1:55
7. "Scarlet and Gold" (Sutherland) – 4:50
8. "Street Song" (Sutherland) – 4:55
9. "Dr. Doom" (Sutherland, Hall) – 3:10
10. "With You" (Ronnie Leatherman) – 2:10
11. "May the Circle Remain Unbroken" (Erickson) – 2:40

=== Bonus tracks from 2009 CD ===
12. "Livin' On" (Sutherland, Hall) – 3:25 (Single version)
13. "Scarlet and Gold" (Sutherland) – 4:59 (Single version)
14. "May the Circle Remain Unbroken" (Erickson) – 2:41 (Single version)
15. "Livin' On" (Sutherland, Hall) – 3:23 (Alternate horn version)

== Personnel ==
=== Musicians ===
- Roky Erickson – vocals & rhythm guitar on tracks 1, 4, 9, 11
- Stacy Sutherland – lead guitar, vocals on tracks 2–3, 5–8, 10
- Tommy Hall – electric jug
- Ronnie Leatherman – bass on tracks 2–3, 5–8, 10
- Duke Davis – bass on tracks 1, 4, 9, 11
- Danny Thomas – drums, horn arrangements

=== Technical ===
- Ray Rush – producer
- Fred Carroll – engineer
- Jim Duff – engineer
- Hank Poole – engineer
- Lloyd Sepulveda – cover
