= Free Form Patterns =

Studio album by Lightnin' Hopkins
- Released: 1968
- Recorded: February 1, 1968
- Studio: International Artists Studio, Houston, TX
- Genre: Blues
- Length: 43:11
- Label: International Artists; IA LP 6
- Producer: Lelan Rogers

Lightnin' Hopkins chronology
Talkin' Some Sense (1968)	Free Form Patterns (1968)	The Great Electric Show and Dance (1969)

Free Form Patterns (also released as Reflections) is an album by the blues musician Lightnin' Hopkins backed by the rhythm section of the 13th Floor Elevators, recorded in Texas in 1968 and released on the International Artists label.

== Reception ==
Professional ratings
Review scores
Source	Rating
AllMusic	3/5 stars
The Penguin Guide to Blues Recordings	2.5/4 stars
Record Collector	4/5 stars

AllMusic's Al Campbell stated: "While not as revolutionary as John Lee Hooker's sessions with Canned Heat, Free Form Patterns steers clear of the late-'60s psychedelic trappings that screwed up such similar sessions as Electric Mud. No one tried to bend Hopkins to fit a foreign musical approach on Free Form Patterns; he made the music bend to him". Record Collector observed that "Free Form Patterns isn't some hippy hybrid, it's a pure blues album – actually, scrub that; it's a pure Lightnin’ Hopkins album". The Penguin Guide to Blues Recordings wrote: "Despite these interpolations it's a rather lacklustre affair".

== Track listing ==
All compositions by Sam "Lightnin'" Hopkins except where noted

1. "Mr. Charlie" – 7:02
2. "Give Me Time to Think" – 3:49
3. "Fox Chase" (Billy Bizor, Marty Rubenstein) – 2:53
4. "Mr. Ditta's Grocery Store" – 5:30
5. "Open Up Your Door" – 3:54
6. "Baby Child" (Bizor, Rubenstein) – 3:35
7. "Cooking's Done" – 3:48
8. "Got Her Letter This Morning" – 4:57
9. "Rain Falling" – 4:33
10. "Mini Skirt" – 3:10

== Personnel ==
=== Performance ===
- Lightnin' Hopkins – electric guitar, vocals
- Duke Davis – bass
- Danny Thomas – drums
- Billy Bizor – harmonica and vocals

=== Production ===
- Lelan Rogers – producer
- Jim Duff – engineer
