= Easter Everywhere =

1967 album by the 13th Floor Elevators

Studio album by The 13th Floor Elevators
- Released: October 25, 1967
- Recorded: September 1967
- Studio: Walt Andrus Studios
- Genre: Psychedelic rock; garage rock
- Length: 41:29
- Label: International Artists
- Producer: Lelan Rogers

The 13th Floor Elevators chronology
The Psychedelic Sounds of the 13th Floor Elevators (1966)	Easter Everywhere (1967)	Live (1968)

Singles from Easter Everywhere
- 1. "I've Got Levitation" Released: 1967; 2. "She Lives (In a Time of Her Own) / It's All Over Now, Baby Blue" Released: 1967; 3. "Slip Inside This House" Released: 1968

Easter Everywhere is the second studio album by the American psychedelic rock band the 13th Floor Elevators. It was released on 25 October 1967, through record label International Artists. The album was packaged with lyrics printed on the inner sleeve, gold ink on the cover, and full color pictures on the reverse. The packaging was quite expensive at the time of release.

In 2012, NME ranked the album number 5 on their list of "10 Best Psychedelic Albums of All Time".

Professional ratings
Review scores
Source	Rating
AllMusic	4.5/5 stars
The Lama Reviews	10/10 (stereo)

== Background ==
=== Symbolism ===
The front cover, hand-drawn by George Banks, prominently features a primeval Eastern sun, intended to represent the open blazing third eye. Above this is the seventh chakra, the ultimate realm of Nirvana. The gold color on which this is printed was chosen as a symbolic color for the divine. Below the sun is the band's name, colored red and formatted to look like the eyebrows of Buddha. This image concept was selected by lyricist and jug player Tommy Hall, along with the rear cover image of a meditating yogi, which is from a photograph of an eighteenth-century painting hanging in the National Museum of Indian Art in New Delhi. Hall selected these images from a Tantric art book, intending to communicate that evolution is obtainable through alignment of the chakras and opening of the third eye (corresponding to the pineal gland); thus a soul coalesces with the collective primeval life force and retains a latent knowledge of its previous existence, therefore consciously achieving immortality.

=== Title ===
While the use of the term Easter in the album's title is often misconstrued as implying the album to be of primarily Christian merit, the album's composition melds the beliefs of multiple religions, combining Buddhist, Hindu, and Gnostic scriptures into a single unifying spiritual concept evaluated from a Western, Christian perspective. In the band's first and only interview, given to Houston fanzine Mother on November 20, 1967, Tommy Hall explained the correct interpretation of the title:

Well, [the title] comes from the idea of Christ Consciousness. And realizing that you can be born again; that you can constantly change and be reformed into a better and better person. It's like a progressive perfection, and Easter Everywhere is sort of the combination or culmination of this idea as echoed in the public. It's like everyone is snapping to this; that there is a middle ground between the Eastern trip and the Western trip, and that is by learning to use your emotion and realizing what emotion is and why it is there and how to control it from a pleasure point of view so that you don't get hung up in a down place. It's just the idea of rising from the dead all over, everywhere.

== Release ==
The album features songs ranging from their own psychedelic "Slip Inside this House" to a psychedelic cover version of Bob Dylan's "It's All Over Now, Baby Blue". "Levitation," which was also released as a single—the latter ranks among the band's well-known songs. As on the previous album, Tommy Hall's electric jug is prominent in the music. The album was met with lukewarm reviews upon initial release, with a review in Billboard Magazine writing "call it intellectual-rock or call it musical flights of fancy, except for tunes that sound almost like each other, this group is inventive over-all".

The master tapes are considered missing (or presumed destroyed). The International Artists label was revived by Lelan Rogers in the late 1970s, who reissued Easter Everywhere along with the label's entire LP catalog in 1979. The album was again reissued on vinyl in 1988 and for the first time on CD in 1991 by Charly Records UK under the Decal imprint.

Following a lawsuit filed by the family of Roky Erickson against Lelan Rogers in 1993 for unpaid royalties, Charly Records purchased the licensing to the full International Artists catalog from Rogers in 1995, which included Easter Everywhere. Some of the surviving analog tapes were delivered to Charly Records. In 2007 Richard Allen and Paul Drummond submitted a proposal to Snapper Music PLC to produce a box set, as a result the International Artists label was once again reactivated for this release (sub-licensed from Charly who were not involved in its production,). In 2009, the original mono version (sourced from vinyl) and an alternate stereo version were released as part of the Sign Of The 3-Eyed Men box set- sourced from Drummond's collection of tapes and Charly's holdings. In 2010, Snappper Music re-released the album in a limited edition CD set featuring "Fire In My Bones", originally released in 1985 on an outtakes album of the same name. The album was again released on vinyl in 2012 as part of the Music Of The Spheres box set, which Snapper Music advertised as "mastered from the original tape source".

In April 2024, the band’s biographer Paul Drummond produced a half-speed master of the album, cut by Miles Showell at Abbey Road Studios. This is the only reissue available that replicates the original 1967 stereo pressing – cut from a tape source. Fans have incorrectly assumed that previous reissues were made from a “1970s phased tape”, they were not, the original cutting engineer in 1967 switched the left and right channels. The half-speed mastered version meticulously replicates all the decisions made by the original engineer who cut the lacquer at Columbia Mastering in 1967.

== Reception ==
Pitchfork, praised the album, describing "Slip Inside This House" as "a masterpiece of psychedelic inventiveness, a spacey blues jam that circles back on itself and eats its tail". They also described 'I Had to Tell You' as heartbreaking, noting that Erickson opted for "a much more direct, reflective approach."

BrooklynVegan ranked the album number 17 on their list of "Top 50 psychedelic rock albums of the Summer of Love," adding: "Easter Everywhere is a transportive album to a higher plane that can still take you there today."

Paste Magazine stated: "Easter Everywhere isn’t as raw or prickly as The Psychedelic Sounds, but it’s a weirder, more expansive record that shows one direction garage rock would head in as it lurched into the late ’60s." He also said that stylistically, the album "straddles the (not particularly wide) gap between garage and psych rock even more than the first one."

Mark Deming of AllMusic felt the "strange patterns of Tommy Hall's electric jug playing are as gloriously bewildering as ever, merging the music of the spheres with an alien attack, and Roky Erickson's vocals make even the most acid-damaged poesy sound passionate, graceful, and wildly alive." and concluded, "Even if less influential than The Psychedelic Sounds of the 13th Floor Elevators, Easter Everywhere is every bit as compelling and a true benchmark of early psychedelic rock"

== Track listing ==
Side A
No.	Title	Writer(s)	Length
1.	"Slip Inside This House"	Roky Erickson, Tommy Hall	8:03
2.	"Slide Machine"	Powell St. John	3:43
3.	"She Lives (In a Time of Her Own)"	Erickson, Hall	2:58
4.	"Nobody to Love"	Stacy Sutherland	3:00
5.	"It's All Over Now, Baby Blue"	Bob Dylan	5:17

Side B
No.	Title	Writer(s)	Length
1.	"Earthquake"	Erickson, Hall	4:51
2.	"Dust"	Erickson, Hall	4:02
3.	"I've Got Levitation"	Hall, Sutherland	2:41
4.	"I Had to Tell You"	Erickson, Clementine Hall	2:28
5.	"Postures (Leave Your Body Behind)"	Erickson, Hall	6:30

== Personnel ==
- Roky Erickson – lead vocal, rhythm guitar, harmonica
- Tommy Hall – electric jug
- Stacy Sutherland – lead guitar, lead vocal ("Nobody To Love")
- Dan Galindo – bass guitar
- Danny Thomas – drums
- John Ike Walton – drums ("She Lives (In a Time of Her Own)", "Levitation")
- Ronnie Leatherman – bass guitar ("She Lives (In a Time of Her Own)", "Levitation")
- Clementine Hall – backing vocals ("I Had to Tell You")

Technical

- Lelan Rogers – production
- Frank Davis – engineering
- Walt Andrus – engineering
- Guy Clark – sleeve photography
- Russell Wheelock – sleeve photography

== Sources ==
- Drummond, Paul (2009). Liner notes to The 13th Floor Elevators - Easter Everywhere, Snapper Music.
