= The Golden Dawn (American band) =

George Kinney of the former Golden Dawn psychedelic rock band

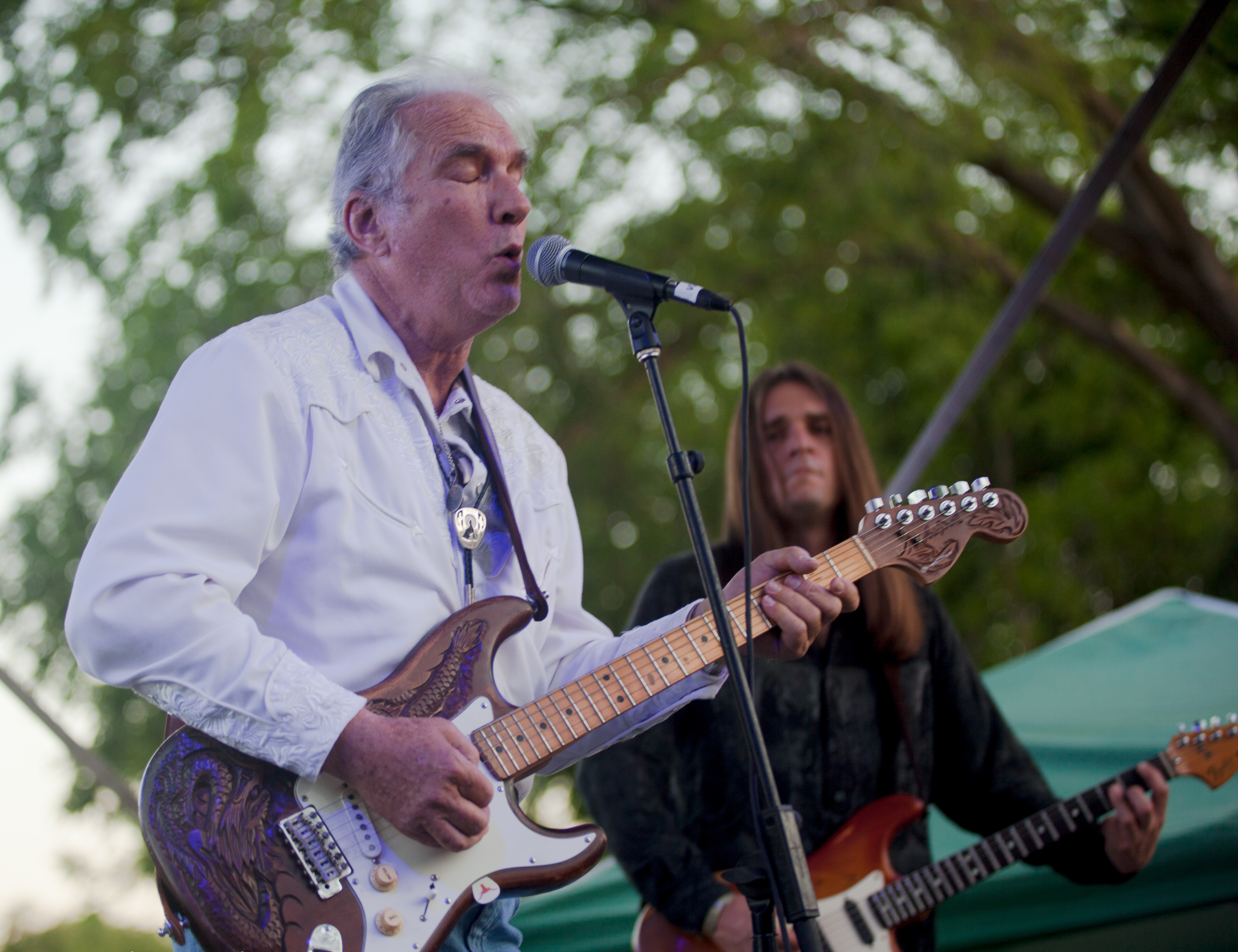
- The Golden Dawn playing at Austin Psych Fest, 2014

Background information
- Origin: Austin, Texas, United States
- Genres: Psychedelic rock
- Years active: 1966–68; 2001–present
- Label: International Artists
- Past members: George Kinney; Tom Ramsey; Jimmy Bird; Bill Hallmark; Bobby Rector

The Golden Dawn are an American psychedelic rock band formed in Austin, Texas, United States, in 1966. The band released one album, titled Power Plant, before breaking up soon after the album's release in 1968. The 1966 release of the album was withheld by International Artists, until after The 13th Floor Elevators' album Easter Everywhere was released, even though Power Plant was recorded nearly a year earlier. As a result, the Power Plant 's reviews tagged it as a copycat record, unworthy of positive consideration. George Kinney remained a recluse figure in the music world for decades until a reemergence in 2001, when Power Plant became an iconic psychedelic recording.

Though the early break up of the original band was unfortunate, this was not the end of the band's influence. George Kinney, lead singer and lyric writer for the band, went on to renew the band with several incarnations up to the present day version resulting in the latest recording, Rebel Heart (2017).

Kinney has also published two full-length novels, The Bandit King and Brave New Texas.

Bobby Rector died in 2007, and Jimmy Bird in 2008. The band's original bassist, Bill Hallmark, died in February 2020. George Kinney died in July 2022. Lead guitarist, Tom Ramsey, resides in Austin, TX.

== Band members ==
Original:

- George Kinney – vocals, guitar
- Tom Ramsey – lead guitar
- Jimmy Bird – rhythm guitar
- Bill Hallmark – bass
- Bobby Rector – drums

Since 2010:

- George Kinney – vocals, guitar
- James Henry – lead guitar
- Michael Morris – drums
- Miranda Morris – backing vocals, flute
- William von Reichbauer – bass, vocals

== Discography ==
- Power Plant (1968)
