= Cegléd water jug =

Hungarian container for water

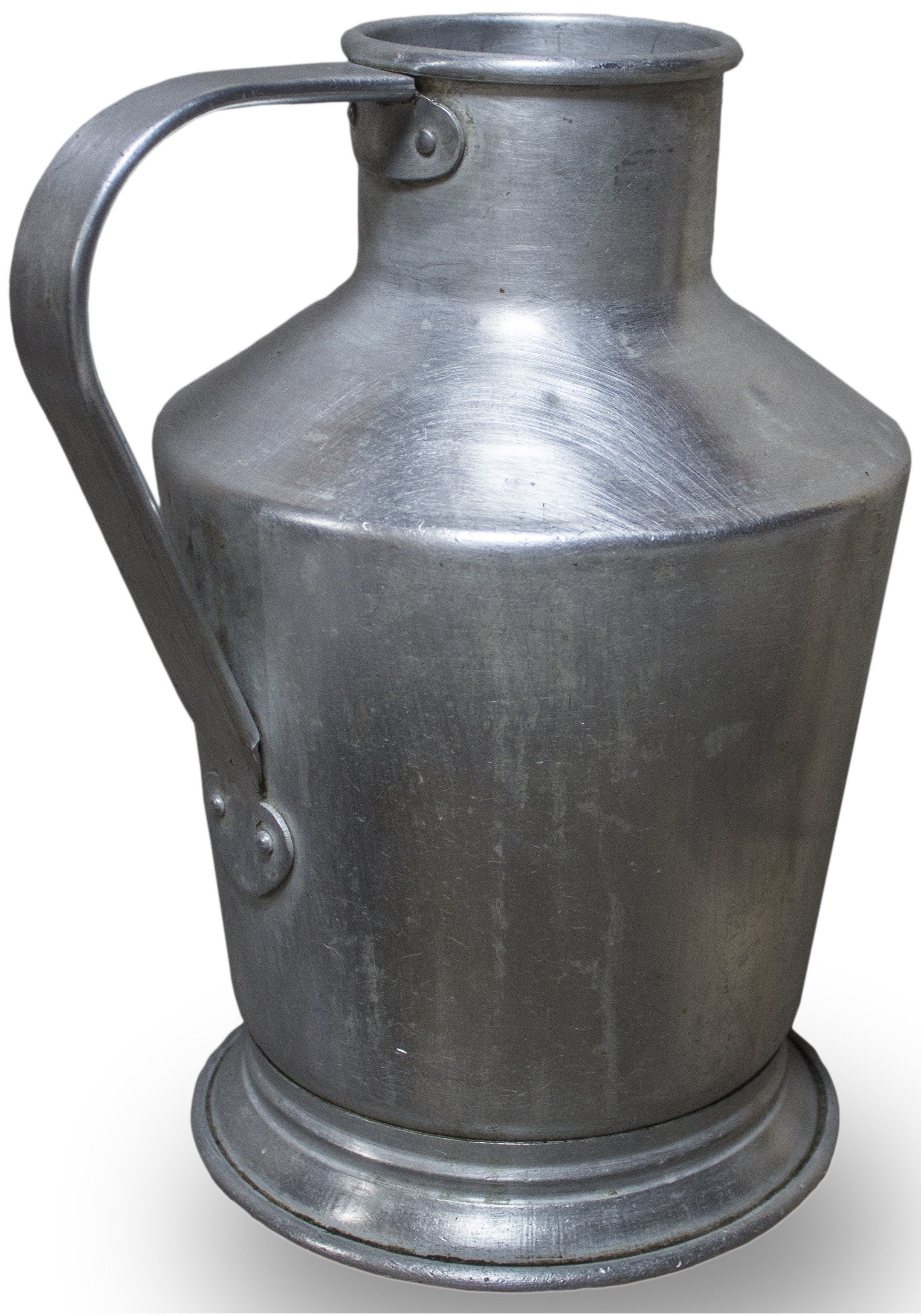
Ceglédi kanna (without lid)

The Cegléd water jug (Hungarian: Ceglédi kanna) is a container for water named after the city of Cegléd, Hungary. It is also used as a musical instrument in folk music, in particular, in Romani music of Hungary. In such cases it is often called simply kanna.

== Container ==
A Cegléd jug is a 7–9 liter metal jug for water, with a handle and a lid. It is a relatively modern invention. They were first manufactured by a János Rónai in Cegléd in the 1910s. Before the wide distribution of water pipelines, Cegléd jugs were popular for delivery of water to farmers during harvest, construction and other workers away from residential places. They quickly became popular, because they were not fragile like pottery jugs, easy to carry by hand, on bicycle or in a car, and were easy to clean. Since there was only one manufacturer for a long time, the name stuck.

Originally Cegléd jugs were made of galvanized tin. Later they were made of aluminium and steel, both bare metal and enamel-covered, typically of red, blue or white color. Despite the complicated shape, the jug (without handle) was made of a single metal sheet. For sturdiness, the mouth and bottom rims were doubly folded. The handle was attached by rivets.

== Musical instrument ==
Cegléd jugs became a rhythm musical instrument among Romani in 1970 through the 1980s. The first usage of the jug is attributed to Károly Rostás ("Huttyán"). Later it was perfected by other Roma musicians, such as Kalyi Jag. When hit by palms, Cegléd jugs produce a wide variety of sounds, depending on the place hit (handle, body, rim), whether it is struck or slapped, whether the jug mouth is muffled, etc. The combination of metal sound and deep dull sound of the air cavity puts the instrument in categories of idiophones and wind instruments.

In 2008 and 2009, two Ceglédi KannaBál festivals, that highlighted this musical instrument, took place. In addition to traditional Romani music, the festival featured reggae, jazz and blues music bands which used Ceglédi jugs. The kanna pioneer József Nagy of Kalyi Jag told the history of the instrument and taught how to play it.

== See also ==
- Jug (instrument)
