= Danny Thomas (drummer) =

American drummer (born 1948)

Danny Thomas (born 1948 in Charlotte, North Carolina) was the drummer for the 13th Floor Elevators from 1967 to 1969, replacing John Ike Walton. Danny played drums and sang backup vocals on the band's final two studio albums, Easter Everywhere and Bull of the Woods. In an interview in 2001, when asked why he had quit the band, his reply was "I never quit".

Whilst part of the 13th Floor Elevators, he was hired as drummer for Delta blues guitarist Sam "Lightnin'" Hopkins to perform and record with Hopkins on the album Free Form Patterns.

After leaving Texas and returning to North Carolina, he played from 1970 to 1997 with the following bands: Lou Curry Band, Dogmeat, and Bessie Mae's Dream with Gene Norman, Rich Carlson, Marcus Cheek, and Jerry Shaver. During this time, he owned his own delivery company called Gophers. Prior to that, he worked in accounting at Carolinas Medical Center.

A vegetarian and humanitarian, he retired in 2006, but had many hobbies including buying and selling antiques and gardening. He retired to Charlotte, North Carolina, with his wife, Juanette. He has three children: two daughters, Christina Thomas Davis and Tiffany Thomas Johnson, and one adopted son, Jason Vincent Brock, an author of horror fiction.
