= Jug (instrument) =

Musical instrument, based on an empty jug

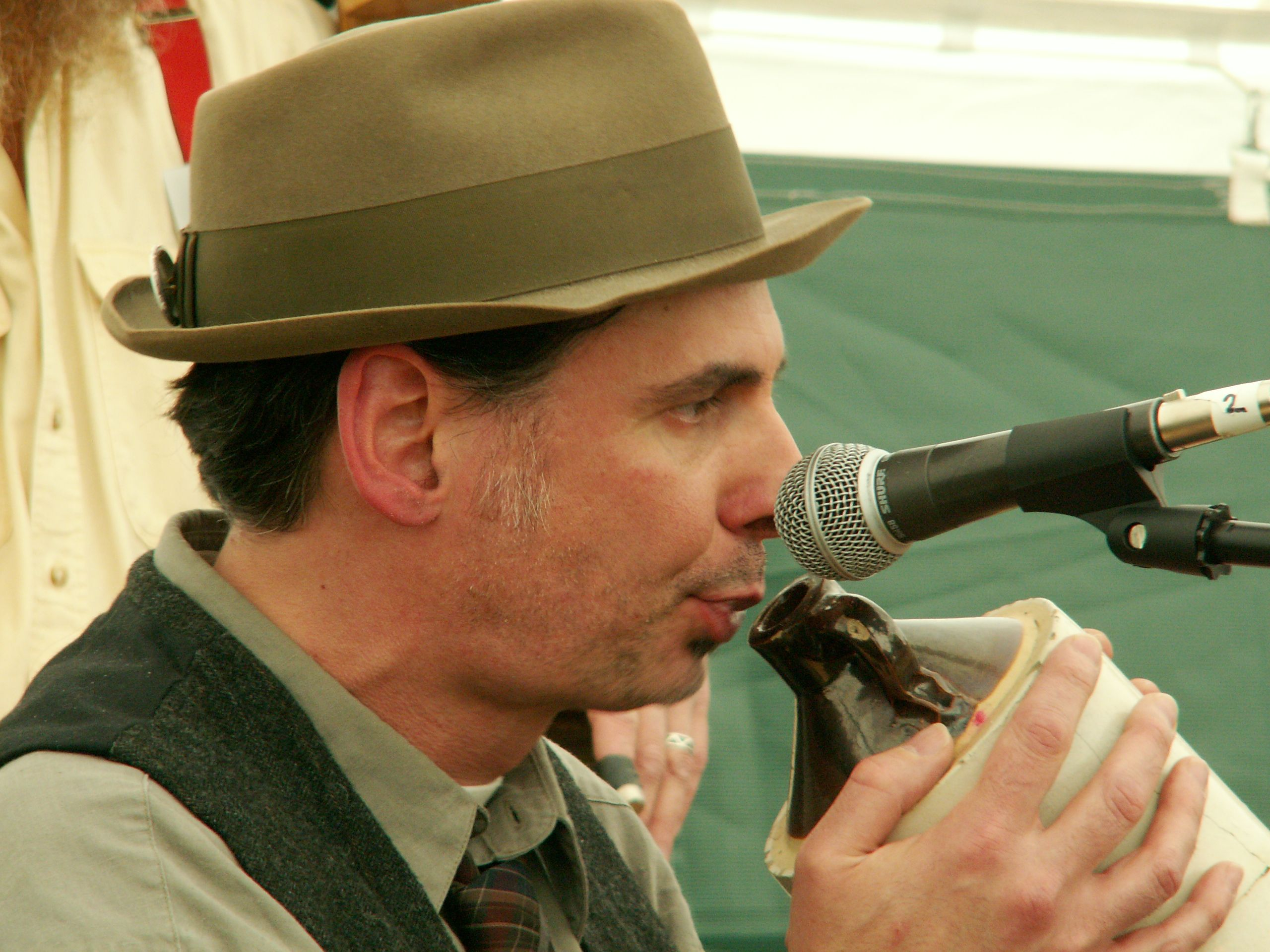
- A jug player

Woodwind instrument
- Other names: Jug
- Classification: Woodwind; Wind Instrument; Aerophone; Vessel flute
- Hornbostel–Sachs classification: 421.13 (Vessel flute (without distinct beak))

Playing range
- typically only a few notes

Related instruments
- Ocarina

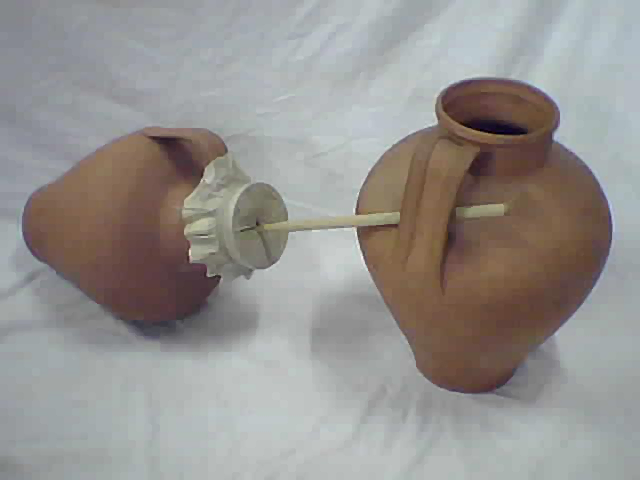
A Spanish cántaro (right), a wine jug used for musical purposes

The jug used as a musical instrument is an empty jug (usually made of glass or stoneware) played with buzzed lips to produce a trombone-like tone. The characteristic sound of the jug is low and hoarse, below the higher pitch of the fiddle, harmonica, and the other instruments in the band.

== Performance ==
With an embouchure like that used for a brass instrument, the musician holds the mouth of the jug about an inch from their mouth and emits a blast of sound, made by a buzzing of the lips, directly into it. The jug does not touch the musician's mouth, but serves as a resonating chamber to amplify and enrich the sound made by the musician's lips. Changes in pitch are controlled by loosening or tightening the lips. An accomplished jug player might have a two-octave range. Some players augment this sound with vocalizations, didgeridoo style, and even circular breathing. In performance, the jug sound is enhanced if the player stands with his back to a wall, which will reflect the sound towards the audience.

The stovepipe (usually a section of tin pipe, 3" or 4"/75 or 100 mm in diameter) is played in much the same manner, with the open-ended pipe being the resonating chamber. There is some similarity to the didgeridoo, but there is no contact between the stovepipe and the player's lips.

As a bass instrument, the jug is part of the band's rhythm section, but jug solos are common. Most jug bands use a single jug player, but there are recordings of period bands that used jug sections of two or more players.

Jugs will also produce sound at their main resonance frequency when air is blown across the top opening. This method is not used in bands, since it is relatively quiet and produces only a single pitch. It is typically used for making glass bottles whistle. A larger bottle produces a lower musical pitch while smaller ones produce higher pitches. The pitch of a bottle played in this way may be controlled by changing its volume by adding or emptying contents. Loudness is a function of the speed of the air blown across the top.

== History ==
The jug as a musical instrument reached its height of popularity in the 1920s, when jug bands, such as Cannon's Jug Stompers flourished. The jug was also popular because it was cheap and easy to carry around.

In addition to the most common ceramic jug, containers of many different materials have been used for musical jugs, e.g. glass jugs and bottles, plastic bleach bottles, tin kerosene cans, etc. Different materials produce different sounds, as do different sizes. The jug is primarily an acoustic instrument, although amplified and "electric jugs" appear from time to time, and have even been used in recordings, such as by Tommy Hall in the 1960s psychedelic band 13th Floor Elevators.

A version of the jug known as the botija was played in early Cuban musical forms such as the son.

In recent times, Fritz Richmond (1939–2005) was a well-known and successful jug player, and his work, found on numerous commercial recordings, provides many examples of jug playing. Josh Smith, (1979–present) of the Glade City Rounders, is one of the most famous jug players touring and playing live.

== See also ==
- Blown bottle
- Cegléd water jug
