= Lelan Rogers =

American record company executive (1928–2002)

Lelan Edward Rogers (June 9, 1928 – July 22, 2002) was an American record producer and record company executive.

He was born in Cherokee County, Texas, United States, the eldest of his parents' eight children, which included his brother, singer Kenny Rogers. He set up several record labels in Texas, beginning in the early 1960s, including Lynn and Sabra. In 1966, he joined the International Artists label, for which he signed and produced artists including the 13th Floor Elevators, the Red Crayola, Bubble Puppy, and the Golden Dawn. His other labels included Lenox, Silver Fox and House of the Fox. He produced recordings for Elderberry Jak, Bettye LaVette and Big Al Downing.

Rogers died of respiratory failure in Nashville, Tennessee, in 2002, at the age of 74.
