= The 13th Floor Elevators =

American rock band

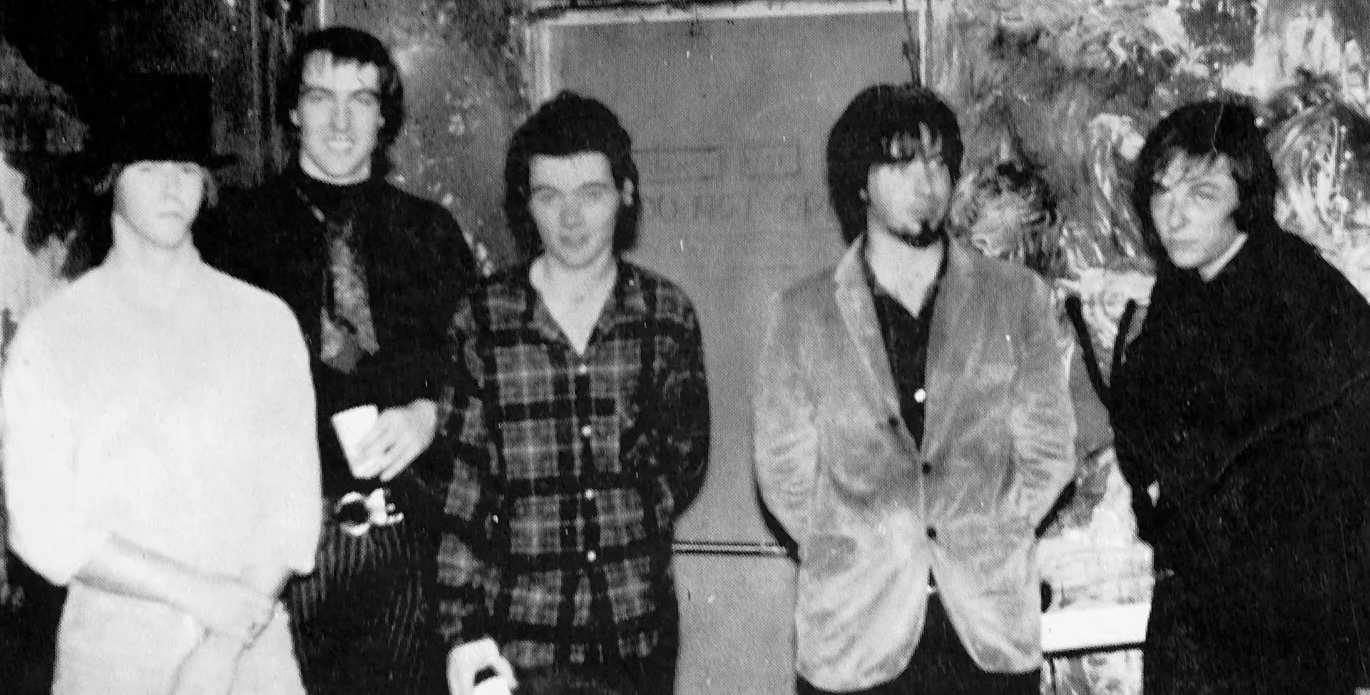
- The 13th Floor Elevators in the 1960s. From left to right, Ronnie Leatherman, John Ike Walton, Roky Erickson, Stacy Sutherland, Tommy Hall.

Background information
- Also known as: The Elevators
- Origin: Austin, Texas, U.S.
- Genres: Psychedelic rock; garage rock; acid rock; proto-punk
- Years active: 1965–1969, 1977, 1984, 2015
- Labels: International Artists, Radar, Charly
- Past members: Roky Erickson; Tommy Hall; Stacy Sutherland; John Ike Walton; Benny Thurman; Ronnie Leatherman; Danny Thomas; Danny Galindo; Duke Davis

The 13th Floor Elevators was an American rock band from Austin, Texas, United States, formed by guitarist and vocalist Roky Erickson, electric jug player Tommy Hall, and guitarist Stacy Sutherland. The band was together from 1965 to 1969, and during that period released four albums and seven singles for the International Artists record label. Their debut single "You're Gonna Miss Me" was a national Billboard No. 55 hit in 1966.

Considered pioneers of psychedelic rock, the Elevators were the first band to refer to their music as such, with the first-known use of the term appearing on their business card in January 1966, likely coined by member Tommy Hall. As open proponents of drugs such as LSD, the group was targeted by local law enforcement, resulting in the 1969 arrest of Erickson for drug possession, effectively ending the group. With their inclusion on the 1972 compilation Nuggets: Original Artyfacts from the First Psychedelic Era, 1965-1968, they also came to be recognized as precursors of punk rock. Their contemporary influence has been acknowledged by a wide range of artists.

In 2009, International Artists released a ten-CD box set entitled Sign of the 3-Eyed Men, which included the mono and new, alternative, stereo mixes of the original albums, together with two albums of previously unreleased material and a number of rare live recordings.

== History ==
=== Formation ===
The 13th Floor Elevators emerged on the local Austin music scene in December 1965. The band formed when guitarist and singer Roky Erickson left his group the Spades, and joined up with guitarist Stacy Sutherland, bassist Benny Thurman, and drummer John Ike Walton who had been playing Texas coastal towns as the Lingsmen. Tommy Hall was instrumental in bringing the band members together, and joined the group as lyricist and electric jug player.

Walton has said the band's name developed from a suggestion by him to use the name "Elevators" and then Clementine Hall (Tommy's wife) added "13th Floor". Whereas Clementine Hall has said both parts were her suggestions. In addition to an awareness that a number of tall buildings in the US lack a designated 13th floor, it was noted that the letter "M" (for marijuana) is the thirteenth letter of the alphabet.

=== 1966–1967: Psychedelic Sounds and Easter Everywhere ===
In early January 1966, producer Gordon Bynum brought the band to Walt Andrus' Studios Houston to record two songs to release as a single on his newly formed Contact record label. The songs were Erickson's "You're Gonna Miss Me", and Hall-Sutherland's "Tried to Hide". Bynum released them as a single on his own label, Contact, on 17 January, and it became a local hit.

On 27 January, the vice squad raided Hall's home and found two pounds of marijuana in the garage. They arrested Hall, Erickson, Sutherland, and Walton who were all present. Erickson's old apartment was raided also, and more was found there. All four were charged with possession. Their bail conditions forbade them from leaving the state, causing them to temporarily lose out on gigs further afield.

Around this time, Erickson met Janis Joplin at a party, while she was back in Texas between stints in San Francisco. After which Erickson wrote the line "I’ve seen your face before, I’ve known you all my life" about her. It would be included in the band's song "Splash 1", which was otherwise written by Hall's wife Clementine. After both Joplin and the Elevators played the same concert at the Methodist Student Centre on March 12th 1966, Hall asked Joplin to join the Elevators, though nothing came of it.

The band were now regularly playing in Houston and Dallas. They also played on live teen dance shows on TV, such as Sumpin Else in 1966, and The Larry Kane Show in 1967.

In May 1966, the band were invited to a meeting with Houston Record label International Artists, who then re-released "You're Gonna Miss Me". Thurman left the band around this time and was replaced by Sutherland's school friend Ronnie Leatherman. During the summer, the IA re-release became popular outside Texas, especially in the San Francisco Bay Area. It peaked on the national Billboard chart at the No. 55 position. Prompted by the success of the single, the Elevators toured the West Coast, made two nationally televised appearances on Where The Action Is and American Bandstand with Dick Clark, and played several dates at the San Francisco ballrooms The Fillmore and The Avalon.

The band members' trial for their earlier arrests came to court on 8 August. Hall and Sutherland were given two years' probation, Erickson got off on a technicality due to the warrant for his apartment having the wrong address, and Walton's charges were dismissed due to lack of evidence.

IA signed the Elevators to a record contract in the summer and released the album The Psychedelic Sounds of the 13th Floor Elevators in November 1966, preceding it with the single "Reverberation" which charted at 129 for one week only.

On returning to Texas in early 1967, they released a single, "(I've Got) Levitation", on 7 February and played shows in Austin and Houston shortly after. In November 1967, the band released a second album, Easter Everywhere. The album featured a cover of Bob Dylan's "It's All Over Now, Baby Blue".

However, shortly before work began on Easter Everywhere, Walton and Leatherman left the band and were replaced by Danny Thomas on drums and Dan Galindo on bass, because of disputes over mismanagement of the band's career by International Artists and a fundamental disagreement between Walton and Hall over the latter's advocacy of the use of LSD in the pursuit of achieving a higher state of human consciousness. As a result, they were not credited in the Easter Everywhere sleevenotes, despite having appeared on "(I've Got) Levitation" and "She Lives (In a Time of Her Own)".

At one point around 1967, Erickson was a roommate of future cult musician Townes Van Zandt. Erickson insisted that he join the Elevators on bass, even though he was a guitarist who had never played bass before. He auditioned for Hall, but Hall rejected him.

An edited down version of "Slip Inside This House", backed with "Splash 1", was released as a single in early 1968. Meanwhile, the Elevators had lost their bass player Danny Galindo. Duke Davis briefly replaced Galindo, before the band's earlier bassist Ronnie Leatherman returned in the summer of 1968.

=== 1968–1969: Bull of the Woods and breakup ===
Following Easter Everywhere, Hall became disengaged from the band and relaxed his position as defacto leader. It was mutually understood that Sutherland would be allowed to record his stockpile of material for the third album. Sutherland took complete control of the third album sessions effectively banishing Erickson and Hall from the studio until he had finished the initial music tracking, and then they would be invited to join and add their contributions. These final sessions largely consisted of Sutherland on guitar, Ronnie Leatherman on bass, and Danny Thomas on drums.

When Sutherland had finished enough material to enlist Erickson and Hall, they all attended a session on February 22, which was the only time the band collectively collaborated on the new album. The next day Erickson returned to the studio at midday to find only the IA bosses there, who talked him into recording material on his own. In three hours, Roky laid down several takes of "May the Circle Remain Unbroken".

The band's next album, Bull of the Woods, is generally believed to have started life under the working title Beauty and the Beast, which was to be Hall's next project after Sutherland's album. Though artwork was produced with this title, Hall denies that it was started.

In late April, after being found screaming and talking gibberish next to Deep Eddy Pool in the early hours of the morning, Erickson was hospitalised and heavily sedated, before being discharged in May. The label, eager for an album to release with Erickson's vocals, commissioned a fake "live" album with some existing recordings. International Artists put out a Live LP in August 1968, which was composed of old demo tapes and outtakes dating back to 1966 for the most part, with fake applause and audience noise added.

IA wanted Erickson to rest in a private hospital and rehabilitation centre, he was voluntarily admitted in July. While there he received shock treatment, with his stay including his 21st birthday. Hall became suspicious of the treatment Erickson was receiving and broke him out of the facility.

During this period Sutherland, Leatherman, and Thomas played a handful of shows around Texas with Steve Webb on vocals. In August the trio recorded some more songs. A last single, "Livin' On", was released in February 1969, preceding the final album Bull of the Woods in March 1969 - which failed to chart.

Drug overuse and related legal problems had left the band in a state of constant turmoil, which took its toll, both physically and mentally, on the members. On March 12 1969, facing a felony marijuana possession charge, Roky Erickson plead insanity and chose to be admitted to a psychiatric hospital rather than serve a prison term.

Sutherland was arrested for parole violation and sent to Huntsville Prison on January 28, 1970.

Several partial reunions took place after the band's 1969 demise. Sutherland and Leatherman played 13 Floor Elevator songs at the Ol' Dog Saloon in Ingram, Texas on April 28, 1977. Another partial reunion occurred at Liberty Lunch in Austin in 1984, with Roky alongside John Ike Walton on drums and Ronnie Leatherman on bass, with Sutherland's place taken by guitarist Greg Forest. Tommy Hall did not participate.

On May 10, 2015, members of the band (Erickson, Hall, Leatherman, and Walton) joined for a 50th Anniversary reunion concert appearance at the psychedelic music festival Levitation 2015. Stacy Sutherland's guitar duties were covered by Fred Mitchim and Eli Southard.

== Musical style ==
The band's sound has been described as "offbeat spiritualism with crude R&B." During the initial months of their existence as a band, the electric guitars used both by Roky Erickson and Stacy Sutherland were Gibson ES-330s. Sutherland's pioneering use of reverb and echo, and bluesy, acid-drenched guitar predates such bands as ZZ Top, Butthole Surfers, and the Black Angels. According to Billy Gibbons of ZZ Top, in the documentary You're Gonna Miss Me, the guitars were run through Fender Blackface Twin Reverbs, Fender Reverb Units (referred to as a "tube reverb" or "reverb tank"), and Gibson Maestro FZ-1 Fuzz-Tones.

A special aspect of the Elevators' sound came from Tommy Hall's innovative electric jug, which was a clay whiskey jug. In contrast to traditional musical jug technique, Hall did not blow into the jug to produce a low percussive sound. Instead, he vocalized musical runs into the mouth of the jug, using the jug to add resonance and reverb to his voice. When playing live, he held the microphone up to the mouth of the jug, but when recording the Easter Everywhere album, the recording engineer placed a microphone inside the jug to enhance the sound.

At Tommy Hall's urging, the band often played their live shows while under the influence of LSD, though John Ike Walton was the exception as he found he couldn't keep time. Intellectual and esoteric influences helped shape their work, which shows traces of Gurdjieff, the General Semantics of Alfred Korzybski, the psychedelic philosophy of Timothy Leary, and Tantra.

The 13th Floor Elevators are considered to be pioneers of psychedelic rock. Mark Deming of AllMusic assessed, "if they weren't [the first true psychedelic rock band], they certainly predated most of the San Francisco bands that gave the sound a global audience." Bill Pearis of BrooklynVegan said: "As far as psychedelic music goes, there are Johnny Come Latelies, bandwagoners, and scene-stealers, and then there’s The 13th Floor Elevators."

== Band members ==
The original 13th Floor Elevators line-up was built around singer/guitarist Roky Erickson, electric jug player Tommy Hall, and guitarist Stacy Sutherland. The rhythm section went through several changes, with drummer John Ike Walton and bass player Ronnie Leatherman being replaced in July 1967. Walton and Leatherman left the band; in their stead were new recruits Danny Thomas (drums, piano) and Dan Galindo (bass) which completed the classic Elevators line-up. Hall remained the band's primary lyricist and philosopher, with Sutherland and Erickson both contributing lyrics as well as writing music, and, later, working with Danny Thomas to arrange the group's more challenging music. In addition to Erickson's powerful vocals, Hall's "electric jug" became the band's signature sound. Later, Ronnie Leatherman returned for the third and final studio album, Bull of the Woods along with Thomas, and Sutherland.

- Roky Erickson – rhythm guitar, lead vocals, songwriter (1965–1968, 1984, 2015; died 2019)
- Tommy Hall – electric jug, vocals, songwriter (1965–1968, 2015)
- Stacy Sutherland – lead guitar, vocals, songwriter (1965–1969; died 1978)
- John Ike Walton – drums (1965–1967, 1984, 2015)
- Benny Thurman – bass, vocals (1965–1966; died 2008)
- Ronnie Leatherman – bass, vocals (1965–1966, 1967, 1968, 1984, 2015)
- Danny Galindo – bass (1966–1968; died 2001)
- Danny Thomas – drums, vocals, arrangements (1967–1969)
- Duke Davis – bass (1968)
- Fred Mitchim – guitar, vocals (2015)
- Eli Southard – guitar (2015)

Other collaborators and contributors

- Powell St. John – member of Mother Earth, songwriter ("Slide Machine", "You Don't Know", "Monkey Island", "Take That Girl", "Kingdom of Heaven", "Right Track Now")
- Clementine Hall – wife of Tommy Hall, vocals and songwriting collaborations with Erickson ("Splash 1" and "I Had to Tell You")

== Other projects ==
=== Roky Erickson ===
After pleading insanity in response to drug charges—he was arrested for possession of a single marijuana joint—Roky Erickson was committed to a mental hospital in 1969. Jason Ankeny of AllMusic has written that the treatments Erickson received during his three-and-a-half-year confinement may have contributed to his subsequent mental troubles. At that point the Elevators had already dissolved, although local promoters, along with their record label, International Artists, made some attempts to keep the band's name alive. Erickson attempted a sporadic solo career, burdened by management who exploited his instability and involved him in contracts that left him no control or profit from his music. After staying mostly out of sight in the 1980s, Erickson gradually returned to music in the 1990s, especially when the tribute album Where the Pyramid Meets the Eye—featuring players from ZZ Top, the Jesus and Mary Chain, and R.E.M., all of whom claimed Erickson's or the Elevators' influence—was released. He recorded All That May Do My Rhyme for the Trance Syndicate label, owned by the Butthole Surfers's King Coffey, who claimed Erickson told him it was the first time he'd ever been given a royalty check for his music. By 2001, Erickson's brother Sumner had been awarded custody of the troubled musician and helped him receive better psychological treatment, restore his physical health, and connect with a legal team that helped him untangle his complicated past contracts and begin receiving more royalties for his music. I Have Always Been Here Before, a 43-track compilation of his post-Elevators music, was released in 2005, and Erickson receives full royalties for the set. In 2010, he released True Love Cast Out All Evil, a full-length collaboration with indie rock band Okkervil River. Erickson died in Austin on May 31, 2019.

=== Stacy Sutherland ===
Stacy Sutherland formed his own band, Ice, which performed only in Houston and never released any material. In 1969, after a battle with heroin addiction, he was imprisoned in Texas on drug charges, the culmination of several years of drug-related trouble with the law. After his release Sutherland began to drink heavily. He continued to sporadically play music throughout the 1970s, occasionally with former members of the Elevators. Sutherland was shot and killed by his wife Bunni on August 24, 1978, during a domestic dispute, and is buried in Center Point, Texas.

=== Danny Galindo ===
Danny Galindo played bass with Jimmie Vaughan's (Stevie Ray's older brother) band Storm in Austin, Texas, during the 1970s. He died in 2001 from complications of Hepatitis C.

=== Danny Thomas ===
Danny Thomas left the 13th Floor Elevators in 1968 and was hired to perform with blues guitarist Lightnin' Hopkins. After leaving Texas and returning to North Carolina, he played from 1970 to 1997 with: Lou Curry Band, Dogmeat, Arthur "Guitar Boogie" Smith, and Bessie Mae's Dream. During this time, he owned his own delivery company called Gophers, Inc. Prior to that he worked in accounting at Carolinas Medical Center (formerly Charlotte Memorial Hospital). He lives in Charlotte, North Carolina with his wife, Juanette, and they have two daughters, Christina Juanette Thomas Davis, and Tiffany Joan Thomas Johnson, and son Jason V. Brock, an author of horror fiction.

=== Benny Thurman ===
Benny Thurman joined a string of other bands, most notably Mother Earth, with Powell St. John, and played with Plum Nelly in the 1970s.

Thurman died on June 22, 2008, at the age of 65.

=== Tommy Hall ===
Tommy Hall currently lives in downtown San Francisco. In the 1980s, he was rumored to be the true identity of Texas outsider musician Jandek, but this has since been disproved. He became a devout follower of Scientology in the 1970s. He has told interviewers that he is no longer interested in music or thinks of himself as a musician, and that "I lost my jug a long time ago."

=== Ronnie Leatherman ===
Bassist Leatherman lives in Kerrville, Texas, where he plays occasionally with local bands and fellow Elevator John Ike Walton.

=== John Ike Walton ===
Drummer Walton, like Leatherman, also settled in his hometown of Kerrville, Texas.

== Legacy ==
"You're Gonna Miss Me" was included on Lenny Kaye's compilation of 1960's garage rock, Nuggets, released in 1972. This led to the Elevators becoming an influence on the nascent punk rock scene. Multiple first wave punk bands were inspired by the Elevators' music. New York band Television covered the Elevator's song "Fire Engine" live in the mid-1970s. "You're Gonna Miss Me" was covered by Australian group Radio Birdman on their debut album and it has been suggested by the Austin Chronicle that The Clash adapted the introductory chords of the song into "Clash City Rockers".

In 1986 multiple underground bands from the U.K. covered songs by the Elevators. Spacemen 3 covered "Rollercoaster" on their debut album, the Shamen recorded "Fire Engine", and Julian Cope covered "Levitation" on the B-side of his biggest hit, "World Shut Your Mouth".

In 1990, 21 contemporary bands—including R.E.M., ZZ Top, Richard Lloyd, the Jesus and Mary Chain, and Primal Scream—recorded covers of Elevators and solo Erickson songs on Where the Pyramid Meets the Eye: A Tribute to Roky Erickson, one of the first tribute albums. The next year, Primal Scream included their cover, "Slip Inside This House", on their breakthrough album Screamadelica.

In the 2000 movie High Fidelity, "You're Gonna Miss Me" is heard in the opening scene, and is the first song on the movie soundtrack album.

The Black Angels, inspired by the Elevators, used an electric jug on "Sunday Afternoon" in 2008.

The song "The Kingdom of Heaven (Is Within You)" was used on the soundtrack of the "Seeing Things" episode of True Detective in 2014.

Parquet Courts included a cover of "Slide Machine" on their 2014 album Content Nausea.

== Discography ==
=== Studio albums ===
Title	Album details
The Psychedelic Sounds of the 13th Floor Elevators	Released: October 17, 1966; Label: International Artists
Easter Everywhere	Released: October 25, 1967; Label: International Artists
Bull of the Woods	Released: March 21, 1969; Label: International Artists

=== Selected compilation albums ===
Title	Album details
Live (Note: Marketed as a live album, Live is actually a compilation of studio outtakes with overdubbed cheering and applause.)	Released: August 1968; Label: International Artists
The Best of the 13th Floor Elevators	Released: 1994; Label: Eva
Absolutely the Best of the 13th Floor Elevators	Released: January 29, 2002; Label: Fuel 2000
We Are Not Live	Released: April 18, 2026; Label: Charly Records

- Live: I've Seen Your Face Before (1988)
- 13 of the Best (2022)

=== Box sets ===
Title	Album details
The Collection	Released: 1991; Label: Decal; Format: CD
4 CD Box Set	Released: 1993; Label: Collectables; Format: CD
The Psychedelic World of the 13th Floor Elevators	Released: March 5, 2002; Label: Charly; Format: CD
The Complete Elevators IA Singles Collection	Released: 2007; Label: Acme; Format: Vinyl
Sign of the 3 Eyed Men	Released: 2009; Label: Charly; Format: CD
The Albums Collection	Released: 2011; Label: Charly; Format: CD
Music of the Spheres	Released: 2011; Label: International Artists; Format: Vinyl

=== Singles ===
List of singles, with selected chart positions, showing year released and album name
Title	Year	Peak chart positions			Album
Title	Year	Billboard Hot 100	Bubbling Under Hot 100	Cashbox	Album
"You're Gonna Miss Me" "Tried to Hide"	1966	55	—	50	The Psychedelic Sounds of the 13th Floor Elevators
"Reverberation (Doubt)" "Fire Engine"	1966	—	129	—	The Psychedelic Sounds of the 13th Floor Elevators
"I've Got Levitation" "Before You Accuse Me"	1967	—	—	—	Easter Everywhere
"I've Got Levitation" "Before You Accuse Me"	1967	—	—	—	non-album single
"She Lives (In a Time of Her Own)" "Baby Blue"	1967	—	—	—	Easter Everywhere
"Slip Inside This House" "Splash 1"	1968	—	—	—	Easter Everywhere
"Slip Inside This House" "Splash 1"	1968	—	—	—	The Psychedelic Sounds of the 13th Floor Elevators
"May the Circle Remain Unbroken" "I'm Gonna Love You Too"	1968	—	—	—	Bull of the Woods
"May the Circle Remain Unbroken" "I'm Gonna Love You Too"	1968	—	—	—	non-album single
"Livin' On" "Scarlet and Gold"	1969	—	—	—	Bull of the Woods

== See also ==
- Music of Austin
- List of psychedelic rock artists
