= Tommy Hall (musician) =

American member of the 13th Floor Elevators

- Born: 1942 or 1943 (age 83–84); Memphis, Tennessee, USA
- Instrument: Jug
- Formerly of: The 13th Floor Elevators

James Thomas Hall (born 1942 or 1943) is a lyricist and electric jug player from Texas. He was a founding member of the American psychedelic rock band the 13th Floor Elevators.

== Early life ==
Hall was born in Memphis, Tennessee to Dr. Thomas James Hall and Margaret "Perky" Perkins, a nurse. Starting in 1961, he studied philosophy and psychology at the University of Texas at Austin, and also discovered psychedelic drugs such as LSD, which would form a major part of his philosophy. In Austin, he also met his future wife and occasional Elevators songwriter Clementine Hall (née Tausch), who he married in 1964. They divorced in 1973.

== Musical career ==
Hall played an amplified electric jug, which became a distinctive element of the band's sound. The jug, a crock-jug with a microphone held up to it while it was being blown, sounded somewhat like a cross between a Minimoog and cuica drum. In contrast to traditional musical jug technique, Hall did not blow into the jug to produce a tuba-like sound. Instead, he vocalized musical runs into the mouth of the jug, using the jug to create echo and distortion of his voice. When playing live, he held the microphone up to the mouth of the jug, but when recording the Easter Everywhere album, the recording engineer placed a microphone inside the jug to enhance the sound.

== Personal life ==
Hall currently lives in downtown San Francisco. In the 1980s, he was rumored to be the true identity of Texas outsider musician Jandek, although this was incorrect.

He became a devout follower of Scientology in the 1970s.

Hall has told interviewers that he is no longer interested in music or thinks of himself as a musician, and that he "lost [his] jug a long time ago."
