= International Artists =

- Founded: 1965
- Defunct: 1971
- Status: Revived 1978
- Genre: Psychedelic rock Blues rock
- Country of origin: United States
- Location: Houston, Texas

International Artists (IA) was an American independent record label based in Houston, Texas, United States, that originally existed from 1965 to 1970. It is not to be confused with International Artists Records, a classical music record label founded in New York City in 1956.

== History ==
During its existence IA, owned by a group of businessmen in Houston, released 13 albums and 39 singles. Among its staff was producer Lelan Rogers, brother of country singer Kenny Rogers. The label is famous for its roster of well-known Texas psychedelic rock bands, including The 13th Floor Elevators, The Red Crayola, and Bubble Puppy, as well as lesser known bands such as The Golden Dawn, Lost And Found, and Endle St. Cloud. International Artists also released an album by blues guitarist Lightnin' Hopkins, Free Form Patterns, that featured session work by the 13th Floor Elevators' rhythm section. An additional album was released on the label Introducing the Boyles Brothers under catalog number IASC #6801 in 1968. International Artist was based out of Gold Star Studios in Houston, Texas, and leased the studio, which for a brief period of time in 1969 and 1970 was known as International Artists Studios. The recording studio, which was renamed SugarHill Recording Studios in 1972, is still in operation.

The label originally folded in 1971 but was revived by Lelan Rogers in 1978. Rogers released a box-set of all 12 reissued albums. In 1980 the double-LP Epitaph for a Legend (IA #13) reissued rare International Artists tracks from Roky Erickson's first band, The Spades; early demos by the Red Crayola; and forgotten relics from other Texas blues and psychedelic artists. A six-CD box set, The Best of International Artists, was released in 2003 and included the entire Epitaph compilation, along with reissues of the debut albums by the Thirteenth Floor Elevators, Red Krayola, Lost & Found, and Bubble Puppy.

In 2008, under Charly Records, the label began to re-issue all of its past albums, together with some rarities and previously unheard recordings, including a 10-CD box set dedicated solely to the 13th Floor Elevators.

== See also ==
- List of record labels
