= Psychedelic rock =

Music genre

- Other names: Psych-rock; acid rock
- Stylistic origins: Rock; psychedelia; folk; garage rock; jazz; blues; electronic; raga; surf; freakbeat
- Cultural origins: Mid 1960s, United States and United Kingdom
- Derivative forms: Art rock; hard rock; heavy metal; jam band; progressive rock; proto-prog; occult rock; krautrock; neo-psychedelia; paisley underground; dream pop; shoegaze; hypnagogic pop

Subgenres
- Acid rock (Note: "Acid rock" may also be a synonym.); raga rock; space rock; synthedelia; garage psych; heavy psych; freakbeat

Fusion genres
- Psychedelic soul; Psychedelic funk; Psychedelic pop; Psychedelic folk; Psychedelic rap; Stoner rock

Regional scenes
- Turkey; Australia; Latin America; New Zealand; Zambia

Local scenes
- Canterbury scene; San Francisco Sound; Bosstown Sound

Other topics
- British underground; experimental rock; folk rock; freak scene; Haight-Ashbury; hippies; jam band; freak-out

Psychedelic rock is a subgenre of rock music that originally emerged during the mid-1960s, inspired by psychedelic culture and centered primarily around the influence of psychoactive and hallucinogenic drugs. The music incorporated new electronic sound effects and recording techniques, extended instrumental solos, and improvisation. Many psychedelic groups differ in style, with the label often applied inconsistently.

Originating in the mid-1960s among British and American musicians, the sound of psychedelic rock invokes three core effects of LSD: depersonalization, dechronicization (the bending of time), and dynamization (when fixed, ordinary objects dissolve into moving, dancing structures), all of which detach the user from everyday reality. Musically, the effects may be represented via novelty studio tricks, electronic or non-Western instrumentation, disjunctive song structures, and extended instrumental segments. Some of the earlier 1960s psychedelic rock musicians were based in folk, jazz, and the blues, while others showcased an explicit Indian classical influence called "raga rock". In the 1960s, there were two main variants of the genre: the more whimsical, surrealist British psychedelia and the harder American West Coast "acid rock". While "acid rock" is sometimes used interchangeably with the term "psychedelic rock", it also refers more specifically to the heavier, harder, and more extreme ends of the genre.

The peak years of psychedelic rock were 1967 to 1969, with milestone events including the 1967 Summer of Love and the 1969 Woodstock Festival, spearheading an international phenomenon that birthed a widespread counterculture and the hippie movement before declining as changing attitudes, the loss of some key individuals, and a back-to-basics approach led surviving performers to move into new musical areas. The genre bridged the transition from early blues and folk-based rock to progressive rock and hard rock, and as a result contributed to the development of sub-genres such as heavy metal. Since the late 1970s it has been revived in various forms of neo-psychedelia.

== Characteristics ==
=== Etymology ===
The term "psychedelic" was coined in 1956 by psychiatrist Humphry Osmond in a letter to LSD exponent Aldous Huxley and used as an alternative descriptor for hallucinogenic drugs in the context of psychedelic psychotherapy. The New York-based folk group the Holy Modal Rounders would use the term "psychedelic" on their version of Lead Belly's "Hesitation Blues" in 1964. In May 1965, drummer John Densmore joined guitarist Robby Krieger in a band called the Psychedelic Rangers which was formed in Los Angeles, California. The duo took LSD legally and wrote only two songs, one of them called "Paranoia". The group was one of the earliest instances of a rock band referring to themselves as "psychedelic". However, John Townley and David Blue formed a short-lived group of the same name that same year in New York. Townley compared the band to the Holy Modal Rounders and had also been roommates with Steve Weber. Densmore and Krieger later joined the Doors in late 1965. In January 1966, Texan band the 13th Floor Elevators would coin the term "psychedelic rock" on business cards which contained an image of a third eye. That same year, the band released The Psychedelic Sounds of the 13th Floor Elevators in October, which was later recognized as the earliest known use of the term "psychedelic" in an album title. This was followed by New York acts the Deep and Blues Magoos releasing Psychedelic Moods and Psychedelic Lollipop in November.

As the countercultural scene developed in San Francisco, the terms acid rock and psychedelic rock were used in 1966 to describe the new drug-influenced music and were being widely used by 1967. The two terms are often used interchangeably, but acid rock may be distinguished as a more extreme variation that was heavier, louder, relied on long jams, focused more directly on LSD, and made greater use of distortion.

=== Musical style ===
Psychedelic rock incorporated new electronic sound effects and recording effects, extended solos, and improvisation. Features mentioned in relation to the genre include:

- electric guitars, often used with feedback, wah-wah and fuzzbox effects units;
- certain studio effects (principally in British psychedelia), such as backwards tapes, panning, flanging, tape loops, and extreme reverb;
- elements of Indian music and other Eastern music, including Middle Eastern modalities;
- non-Western instruments (especially in British psychedelia), specifically those originally used in Indian classical music, such as sitar, tambura and tabla;
- elements of free-form jazz;
- a strong keyboard presence, especially electronic organs, harpsichords, or the Mellotron (an early tape-driven sampler);
- extended instrumental segments, especially guitar solos, or jams;
- disjunctive song structures, occasional key and time signature changes, modal melodies and drones;
- droning quality in vocals;
- electronic instruments such as synthesizers and the theremin;
- lyrics that made direct or indirect reference to hallucinogenic drugs;
- surreal, whimsical, esoterically or literary-inspired lyrics with (especially in British psychedelia) references to childhood;
- Victorian-era antiquation (exclusive to British psychedelia), drawing on items such as music boxes, music hall nostalgia and circus sounds.

== Original psychedelic era ==
=== 1960–1965: Precursors and influences ===
The first mention of LSD on a rock record was the Gamblers' 1960 surf instrumental "LSD 25". (Note: Their keyboardist, Bruce Johnston, went on to join the Beach Boys in 1965. He would recall: "[LSD is] something I've never thought about and never done.") Music critic Richie Unterberger says that attempts to "pin down" the first psychedelic record are "nearly as elusive as trying to name the first rock & roll record". Some of the "far-fetched claims" include the instrumental "Telstar" (produced by Joe Meek for the Tornados in 1962) and the Dave Clark Five's "massively reverb-laden" "Any Way You Want It" (1964). A 1962 single by the Ventures, "The 2000 Pound Bee", issued forth the buzz of a distorted, "fuzztone" guitar, and the quest into "the possibilities of heavy, transistorised distortion" and other effects, like improved reverb and echo, began in earnest on London's fertile rock 'n' roll scene. By 1964 fuzztone could be heard on singles by P.J. Proby, and the Beatles had employed feedback in "I Feel Fine", their sixth consecutive number 1 hit in the UK.

According to AllMusic, the emergence of psychedelic rock in the mid-1960s resulted from British groups who made up the British Invasion of the US market and folk rock bands seeking to broaden "the sonic possibilities of their music". Writing in his 1969 book The Rock Revolution, Arnold Shaw said the genre in its American form represented generational escapism, which he identified as a development of youth culture's "protest against the sexual taboos, racism, violence, hypocrisy and materialism of adult life".

American folk singer Bob Dylan's influence was central to the creation of the folk rock movement in 1965, and his lyrics remained a touchstone for the psychedelic songwriters of the late 1960s. Virtuoso sitarist Ravi Shankar had begun in 1956 a mission to bring Indian classical music to the West, inspiring jazz, classical and folk musicians. By the mid-1960s, his influence extended to a generation of young rock musicians who soon made raga rock part of the psychedelic rock aesthetic and one of the many intersecting cultural motifs of the era. In the British folk scene, blues, drugs, jazz and Eastern influences blended in the early 1960s work of Davy Graham, who adopted modal guitar tunings to transpose Indian ragas and Celtic reels. Graham was highly influential on Scottish folk virtuoso Bert Jansch and other pioneering guitarists across a spectrum of styles and genres in the mid-1960s. (Note: According to Stewart Home, Graham was "the key early figure ... Influential but without much commercial impact, Graham's mix of folk, blues, jazz, and eastern scales backed on his solo albums with bass and drums was a precursor to and ultimately an integral part of the folk rock movement of the later sixties. ... It would be difficult to underestimate Graham's influence on the growth of hard drug use in British counterculture.") Jazz saxophonist and composer John Coltrane had a similar impact, as the exotic sounds on his albums My Favorite Things (1960) and A Love Supreme (1965), the latter influenced by the ragas of Shankar, were source material for guitar players and others looking to improvise or "jam".

Folk/avant-garde guitarist John Fahey recorded several songs in the early 1960s experimented with unusual recording techniques, including backwards tapes, and novel instrumental accompaniment including flute and sitar. His nineteen-minute "The Great San Bernardino Birthday Party" "anticipated elements of psychedelia with its nervy improvisations and odd guitar tunings". Similarly, folk guitarist Sandy Bull's early work "incorporated elements of folk, jazz, and Indian and Arabic-influenced dronish modes". His 1963 album Fantasias for Guitar and Banjo explores various styles and "could also be accurately described as one of the very first psychedelic records". In 1965, New York band the Fugs would make mention of LSD on their song "I Couldn't Get High".

=== 1965: Formative psychedelic scenes and sounds ===
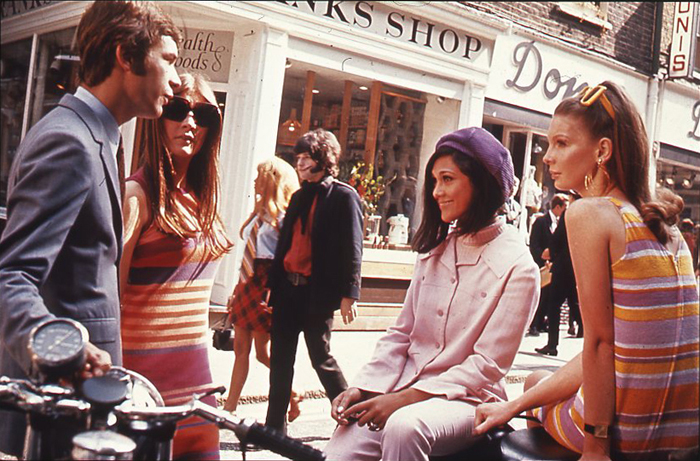
"Swinging London", Carnaby Street, c. 1966

Barry Miles, a leading figure in the 1960s UK underground, says that "Hippies didn't just pop up overnight" and that "1965 was the first year in which a discernible youth movement began to emerge [in the US]. Many of the key 'psychedelic' rock bands formed this year." On the US West Coast, underground chemist Augustus Owsley Stanley III and Ken Kesey (along with his followers known as the Merry Pranksters) helped thousands of people take uncontrolled trips at Kesey's Acid Tests and in the new psychedelic dance halls. In Britain, Michael Hollingshead opened the World Psychedelic Centre and Beat Generation poets Allen Ginsberg, Lawrence Ferlinghetti and Gregory Corso read at the Royal Albert Hall. Miles adds: "The readings acted as a catalyst for underground activity in London, as people suddenly realized just how many like-minded people there were around. This was also the year that London began to blossom into colour with the opening of the Granny Takes a Trip and Hung On You clothes shops." Thanks to media coverage, use of LSD became widespread. (Note: The growth of underground culture in Britain was facilitated by the emergence of alternative weekly publications like IT (International Times) and Oz which featured psychedelic and progressive music together with the counterculture lifestyle, which involved long hair, and the wearing of wild shirts from shops like Mr Fish, Granny Takes a Trip and old military uniforms from Carnaby Street (Soho) and King's Road (Chelsea) boutiques.)

According to music critic Jim DeRogatis, writing in his book on psychedelic rock, Turn on Your Mind, the Beatles are seen as the "Acid Apostles of the New Age". Producer George Martin, who was initially known as a specialist in comedy and novelty records, responded to the Beatles' requests by providing a range of studio tricks that ensured the group played a leading role in the development of psychedelic effects. Anticipating their overtly psychedelic work, "Ticket to Ride" (April 1965) introduced a subtle, drug-inspired drone suggestive of India, played on rhythm guitar. Musicologist William Echard writes that the Beatles employed several techniques in the years up to 1965 that soon became elements of psychedelic music, an approach he describes as "cognate" and reflective of how they, like the Yardbirds, were early pioneers in psychedelia. As important aspects the group brought to the genre, Echard cites the Beatles' rhythmic originality and unpredictability; "true" tonal ambiguity; leadership in incorporating elements from Indian music and studio techniques such as vari-speed, tape loops and reverse tape sounds; and their embrace of the avant-garde.

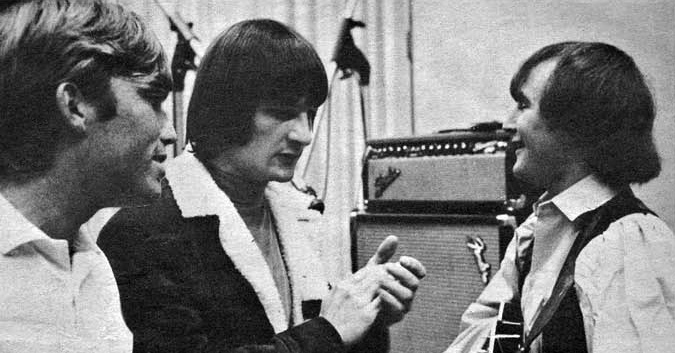
Producer Terry Melcher in the studio with the Byrds' Gene Clark and David Crosby, 1965

In Unterberger's opinion, the Byrds, emerging from the Los Angeles folk rock scene, and the Yardbirds, from England's blues scene, were more responsible than the Beatles for "sounding the psychedelic siren". Drug use and attempts at psychedelic music moved out of acoustic folk-based music towards rock soon after the Byrds, inspired by the Beatles' 1964 film A Hard Day's Night, adopted electric instruments to produce a chart-topping version of Dylan's "Mr. Tambourine Man" in the summer of 1965. (Note: In the song's lyric, the narrator requests: "Take me on a trip upon your magic swirling ship". Whether this was intended as a drug reference was unclear, but the line would enter rock music when the song was a hit for the Byrds later in the year.) On the Yardbirds, Unterberger identifies lead guitarist Jeff Beck as having "laid the blueprint for psychedelic guitar", and says that their "ominous minor key melodies, hyperactive instrumental breaks (called rave-ups), unpredictable tempo changes, and use of Gregorian chants" (Still I'm Sad) helped to define the "manic eclecticism" typical of early psychedelic rock. The band's "Heart Full of Soul" (June 1965), which includes a distorted guitar riff that replicates the sound of a sitar, peaked at number 2 in the UK and number 9 in the US. In Echard's description, the song "carried the energy of a new scene" as the guitar-hero phenomenon emerged in rock, and it heralded the arrival of new Eastern sounds. That same month, Los Angeles, California-based musician Kim Fowley released the single "The Trip". Additionally, the Kinks provided the first example of sustained Indian-style drone in rock when they used open-tuned guitars to mimic the tambura on "See My Friends" (July 1965), which became a top 10 hit in the UK.

In 1984, English music journalist Phil Smee coined the term "freakbeat" when compiling reissues of obscure mid-1960s records for the Rubble series, which featured heavily distorted mod music derived from British beat that used psychedelic studio experimentation. Sometimes described as "more punk than punk itself", freakbeat has been considered the psychedelic, British response to US garage rock and proto-punk, and thus a direct predecessor of British psychedelia.

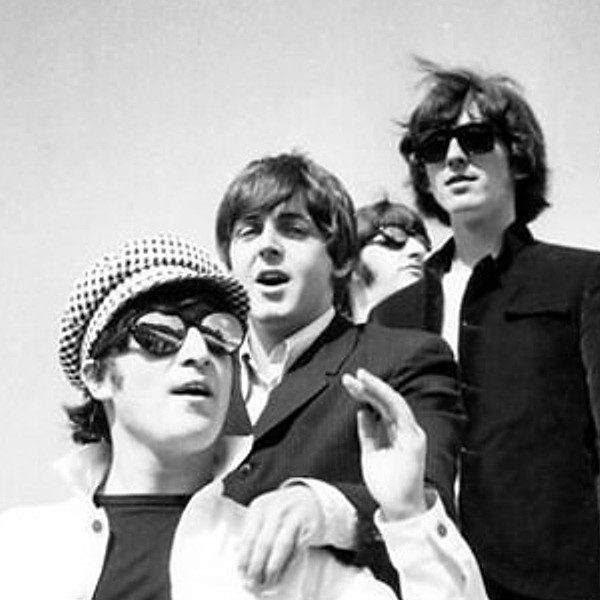
The Beatles on tour, July 1965

The Beatles' "Norwegian Wood" from the December 1965 album Rubber Soul marked the first released recording on which a member of a Western rock group played the sitar. (Note: While Beck's influence had been Ravi Shankar records, the Kinks' Ray Davies was inspired during a trip to Bombay, where he heard the early morning chanting of Indian fisherman. The Byrds were also delving into the raga sound by late 1965, their "music of choice" being Coltrane and Shankar records. That summer they shared their enthusiasm for Shankar's music and its transcendental qualities with George Harrison and John Lennon during a group acid trip in Los Angeles. The sitar and its attending spiritual philosophies became a lifelong pursuit for Harrison, as he and Shankar would "elevate Indian music and culture to mainstream consciousness".) The Yardbirds had experimented with the instrument earlier, alongside the tabla, during recording sessions for "Heart Full of Soul" in April 1965, but dissatisfied with the results, guitarist Jeff Beck ultimately opted for a fuzz-driven electric guitar instead. Norwegian Wood sparked a craze for the sitar and other Indian instrumentation – a trend that fueled the growth of raga rock as the India exotic became part of the essence of psychedelic rock. (Note: Previously, Indian instrumentation had been included in Ken Thorne's orchestral score for the band's Help! film soundtrack.) Music historian George Case recognises Rubber Soul as the first of two Beatles albums that "marked the authentic beginning of the psychedelic era", while music critic Robert Christgau similarly wrote that "Psychedelia starts here". San Francisco historian Charles Perry recalled the album being "the soundtrack of the Haight-Ashbury, Berkeley and the whole circuit", as pre-hippie youths suspected that the songs were inspired by drugs.

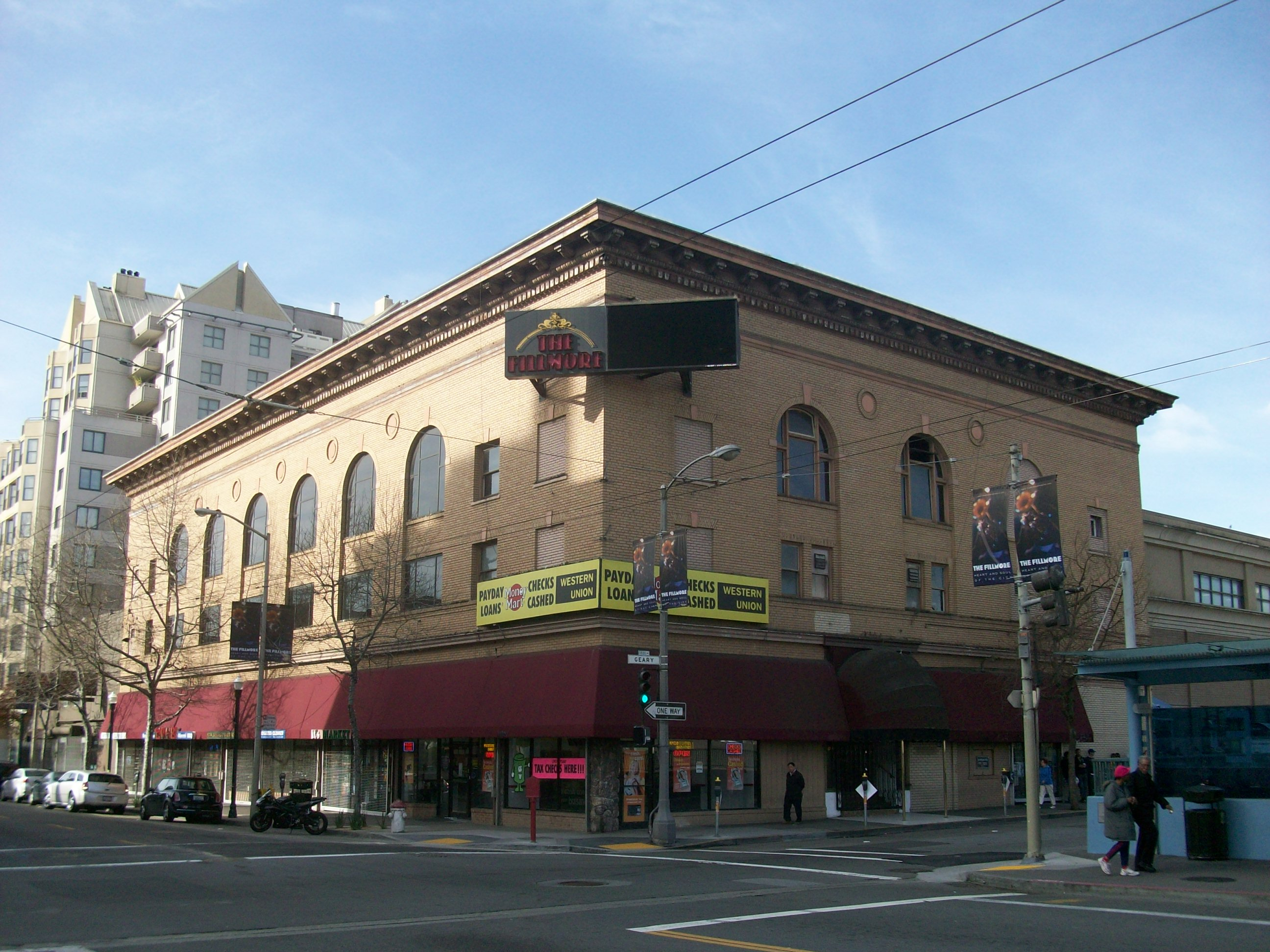
The Fillmore, San Francisco (pictured in 2010)

Although psychedelia was introduced in Los Angeles through the Byrds, according to Shaw, San Francisco emerged as the movement's capital on the West Coast. Several California-based folk acts followed the Byrds into folk rock, bringing their psychedelic influences with them, to produce the "San Francisco Sound". (Note: Particularly prominent products of the scene were the Grateful Dead (who had effectively become the house band of the Acid Tests), Country Joe and the Fish, the Great Society, Big Brother and the Holding Company, the Charlatans, Moby Grape, Quicksilver Messenger Service and Jefferson Airplane.) Music historian Simon Philo writes that although some commentators would state that the centre of influence had moved from London to California by 1967, it was British acts like the Beatles and the Rolling Stones that helped inspire and "nourish" the new American music in the mid-1960s, especially in the formative San Francisco scene. The music scene there developed in the city's Haight-Ashbury neighborhood in 1965 at basement shows organised by Chet Helms of the Family Dog; and as Jefferson Airplane founder Marty Balin and investors opened The Matrix nightclub that summer and began booking his and other local bands such as the Grateful Dead, the Steve Miller Band and Country Joe & the Fish. Helms and San Francisco Mime Troupe manager Bill Graham in the fall of 1965 organised larger scale multi-media community events/benefits featuring the Airplane, the Diggers and Allen Ginsberg. By early 1966 Graham had secured booking at The Fillmore, and Helms at the Avalon Ballroom, where in-house psychedelic-themed light shows replicated the visual effects of the psychedelic experience. Graham became a major figure in the growth of psychedelic rock, attracting most of the major psychedelic rock bands of the day to The Fillmore. (Note: When this proved too small he took over Winterland and then the Fillmore West (in San Francisco) and the Fillmore East (in New York City), where major rock artists from both the US and the UK came to play.)

According to author Kevin McEneaney, the Grateful Dead "invented" acid rock in front of a crowd of concertgoers in San Jose, California on 4 December 1965, the date of the second Acid Test held by novelist Ken Kesey and the Merry Pranksters. Their stage performance involved the use of strobe lights to reproduce LSD's "surrealistic fragmenting" or "vivid isolating of caught moments". The Acid Test experiments subsequently launched the entire psychedelic subculture.

=== 1966: Growth and early popularity ===
Psychedelia. I know it's hard, but make a note of that word because it's going to be scattered round the in-clubs like punches at an Irish wedding. It already rivals "mom" as a household word in New York and Los Angeles ...

— Melody Maker, October 1966

Echard writes that in 1966, "the psychedelic implications" advanced by recent rock experiments "became fully explicit and much more widely distributed", and by the end of the year, "most of the key elements of psychedelic topicality had been at least broached." DeRogatis says the start of psychedelic (or acid) rock is "best listed at 1966". Music journalists Pete Prown and Harvey P. Newquist locate the "peak years" of psychedelic rock between 1966 and 1969. In 1966, media coverage of rock music changed considerably as the music became reevaluated as a new form of art in tandem with the growing psychedelic community.

The Byrds' "Eight Miles High" (1966)
Excerpt of intro with guitar figure and part of first verse

In February and March, two singles were released that later achieved recognition as the first psychedelic hits: the Yardbirds' "Shapes of Things" and the Byrds' "Eight Miles High". (Note: Brian Boyd of The Irish Times credits the Byrds' Fifth Dimension (July 1966) with being the first psychedelic album. Unterberger views it as "the first album by major early folk-rockers to break ... into folk-rock-psychedelia".) The former reached number 3 in the UK and number 11 in the US, and continued the Yardbirds' exploration of guitar effects, Eastern-sounding scales, and shifting rhythms. (Note: Beatles' historian Ian MacDonald comments that Paul McCartney's guitar solo on "Taxman" from Revolver "goes far beyond anything in the Indian style Harrison had done on guitar, the probable inspiration being Jeff Beck's ground-breaking solo on the Yardbirds' astonishing 'Shapes of Things'".) Writer David Simonelli stated the single showcased "a long drone that gave the song a psychedelic feel". By overdubbing guitar parts, Beck layered multiple takes for his solo, which included extensive use of fuzz tone and harmonic feedback. The song's lyrics, which Unterberger describes as "stream-of-consciousness", have been interpreted as pro-environmental or anti-war. On "Eight Miles High", Roger McGuinn's 12-string Rickenbacker guitar provided a psychedelic interpretation of free jazz and Indian raga, channelling Coltrane and Shankar, respectively. The song's lyrics were widely taken to refer to drug use, although the Byrds denied it at the time. (Note: The result of this directness was limited airplay, and there was a similar reaction when Dylan released "Rainy Day Women ♯12 & 35" (April 1966), with its repeating chorus of "Everybody must get stoned!") "Eight Miles High" peaked at number 14 in the US and reached the top 30 in the UK. In April 1966, British band the Pretty Things released "Come See Me" backed with "£. s. d.", the b-side used the abbreviation for Pounds, Shillings, and Pence as a double entendre for the drug LSD, which led to the song being banned by the BBC for drug references. In June 1966, Frank Zappa's the Mothers of Invention released the album Freak Out! which originally made use of the word "psychedelic" on the track "Help, I'm a Rock (Third Movement: It Can't Happen Here)" though later censored by their label Verve Records.

Donovan's July 1966 single "Sunshine Superman" became one of the first psychedelic rock singles to top the Billboard charts in the US. Influenced by Aldous Huxley's The Doors of Perception, and with lyrics referencing LSD, it contributed to bringing psychedelia to the mainstream. Contributing to psychedelia's emergence into the pop mainstream was the release of the Beach Boys' Pet Sounds (May 1966) and the Beatles' Revolver (August 1966). Pet Sounds contained many elements that would be incorporated into psychedelia, with its artful experiments, psychedelic lyrics based on emotional longings and self-doubts, elaborate sound effects and new sounds on both conventional and unconventional instruments. The album track "I Just Wasn't Made for These Times" contained the first use of theremin sounds on a rock record. Scholar Philip Auslander says that even though psychedelic music is not normally associated with the Beach Boys, the "odd directions" and experiments in Pet Sounds "put it all on the map. ... basically that sort of opened the door – not for groups to be formed or to start to make music, but certainly to become as visible as say Jefferson Airplane or somebody like that." Subsequently, the Beach Boys' October 1966 single "Good Vibrations" was another early pop song to incorporate psychedelic lyrics and sounds. The single's success prompted an unexpected revival in theremins and increased the awareness of analog synthesizers. As psychedelia gained prominence, Beach Boys-style harmonies would be ingrained into the newer psychedelic pop.

The Beatles' "Rain" (1966)
23-second segment of chorus

DeRogatis views Revolver as another of "the first psychedelic rock masterpieces", along with Pet Sounds. The Beatles' May 1966 B-side "Rain", recorded during the Revolver sessions, was the first pop recording to contain reversed sounds. Together with further studio tricks such as varispeed, the song includes a droning melody that reflected the band's growing interest in non-Western musical form and lyrics conveying the division between an enlightened psychedelic outlook and conformism. Philo cites "Rain" as "the birth of British psychedelic rock" and describes Revolver as "[the] most sustained deployment of Indian instruments, musical form and even religious philosophy" heard in popular music up to that time. Author Steve Turner recognises the Beatles' success in conveying an LSD-inspired worldview on Revolver, particularly with "Tomorrow Never Knows", as having "opened the doors to psychedelic rock (or acid rock)". In author Shawn Levy's description, it was "the first true drug album, not [just] a pop record with some druggy insinuations", while musicologists Russell Reising and Jim LeBlanc credit the Beatles with "set[ting] the stage for an important subgenre of psychedelic music, that of the messianic pronouncement". (Note: Sam Andrew of Big Brother and the Holding Company recalled that the album resonated with musicians in San Francisco, in that the Beatles "had definitely come 'on board'" with regard to the counterculture. In the 1995 documentary series Rock & Roll, Phil Lesh of the Grateful Dead recalled thinking that with Revolver the Beatles had embraced the "psychedelic avant-garde".) Echard highlights early records by the 13th Floor Elevators and Love among the key psychedelic releases of 1966, along with "Shapes of Things", "Eight Miles High", "Rain" and Revolver.

==== Garage psychedelia ====
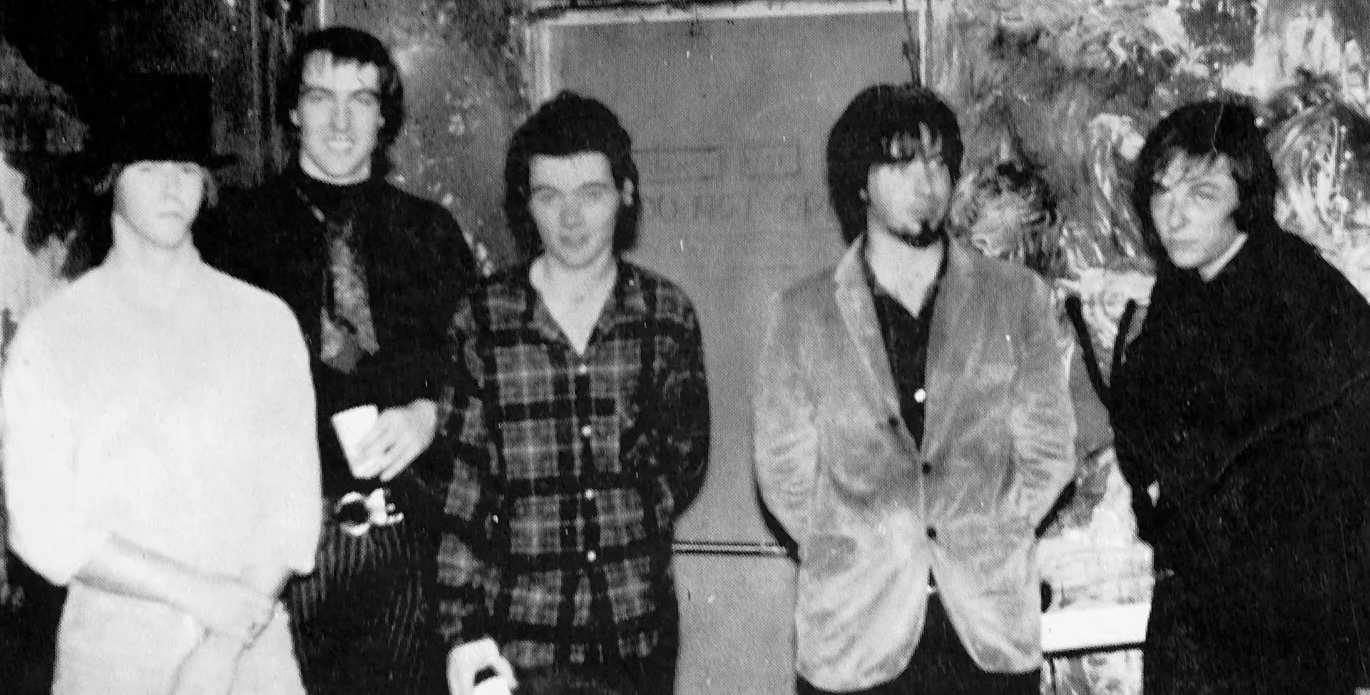
The 13th Floor Elevators have been described as the leading band of the 1960s Texas psychedelic scene.

Originating from Austin, Texas, the 13th Floor Elevators formed in late 1965 with the aim of spreading LSD consciousness, they commissioned business cards containing an image of the third eye and one of the earliest known uses of the term "Psychedelic rock" in January 1966. That same month, they released their debut single "You're Gonna Miss Me" which peaked at number 55 on the Billboard Hot 100, the song featured an electric jug performed by band member Tommy Hall. (Note: The term was used in an article about the band titled "Unique Elevators Shine with 'Psychedelic Rock'", in the 10 February 1966 edition of the Austin American-Statesman.) The band later released their debut album, The Psychedelic Sounds of the 13th Floor Elevators in October that year. It was the first rock album to include the adjective in its title. Rolling Stone highlights the 13th Floor Elevators as arguably "the most important early progenitors of psychedelic garage rock".

Music critic Lester Bangs writing in 1981 in his essay "Protopunk: The Garage Bands" noted that during the mid-1960s, American garage rock bands such as the Count Five, the Seeds, the Standells, the Music Machine and the Electric Prunes began to draw influences from the early psychedelic music scene: "The next phase of protopunk coincided with the rise of psychedelia and the fall of folk rock in 1966. Now the garage bands entered their golden age, as new technical developments like fuzztone and the electric 12-string guitar put truly awesome sonic possibilities within the reach of the most limited musicians. What's more, just about the time they were also discovering acid, all these guys found out about instant ragas: to approximate the sounds of the mystic East, all they had to do was play scales up and down their fretboards".

=== 1967–1969: Continued development ===
==== Peak era ====
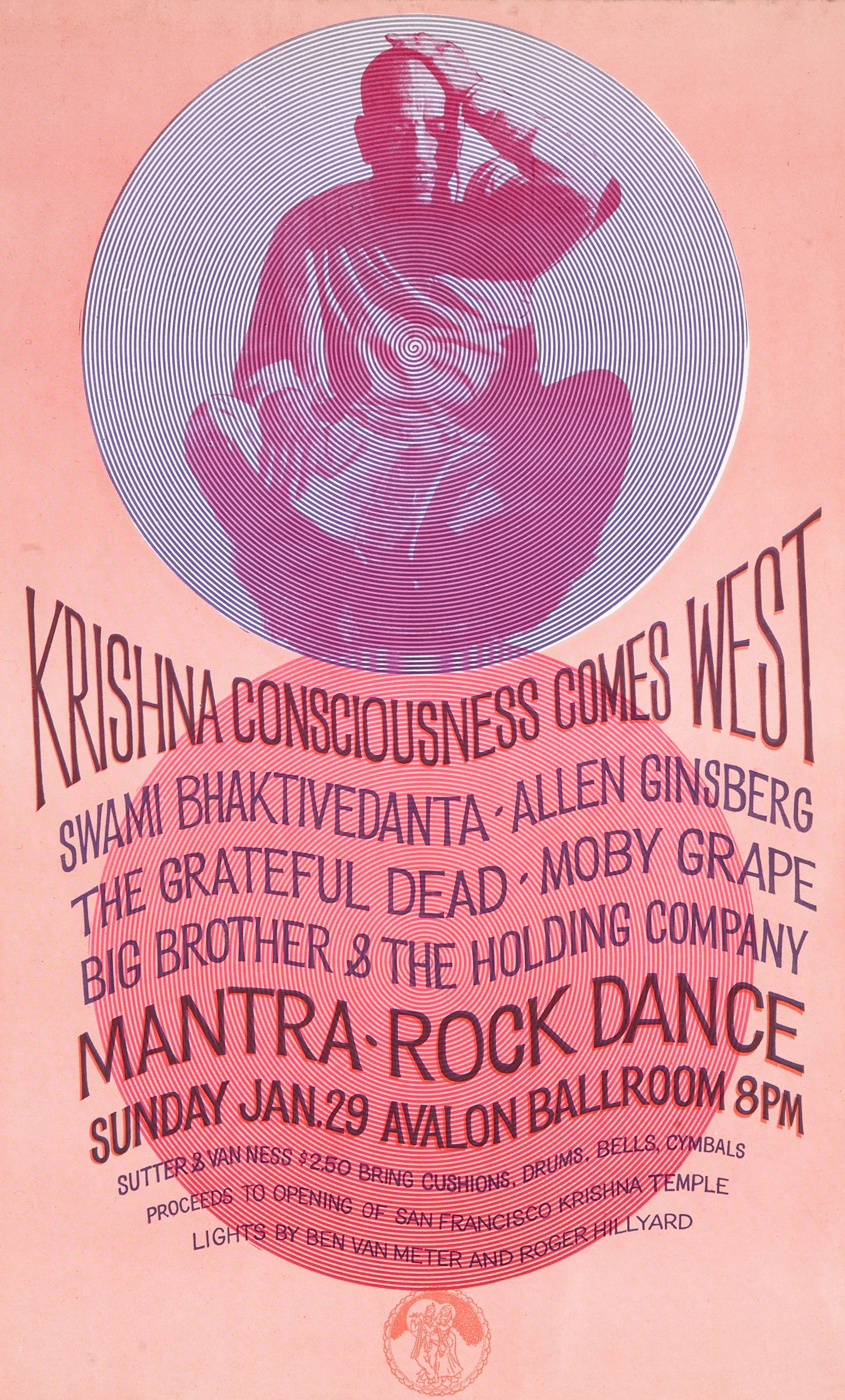
Poster for the Mantra-Rock Dance event held at San Francisco's Avalon Ballroom in January 1967. The headline acts included the Grateful Dead, Big Brother and the Holding Company and Moby Grape.

In 1967, psychedelic rock received widespread media attention and a larger audience beyond local psychedelic communities. From 1967 to 1968, it was the prevailing sound of rock music, either in the more whimsical British variant, or the harder American West Coast acid rock. Music historian David Simonelli says the genre's commercial peak lasted "a brief year", with San Francisco and London recognised as the two key cultural centres. Compared with the American form, British psychedelic music was often more arty in its experimentation, and it tended to stick within pop song structures. Music journalist Mark Prendergast writes that it was only in US garage-band psychedelia that the often whimsical traits of UK psychedelic music were found. He says that aside from the work of the Byrds, Love and the Doors, there were three categories of US psychedelia: the "acid jams" of the San Francisco bands, who favoured albums over singles; pop psychedelia typified by groups such as the Beach Boys and Buffalo Springfield; and the "wigged-out" music of bands following in the example of the Beatles and the Yardbirds, such as the Electric Prunes, the Nazz, the Chocolate Watchband and the Seeds. (Note: Writing in 1969, Shaw said New York's Tompkins Square Park was the East Coast "center of hippiedom". He cited the Blues Magoos as the main psychedelic act and as "a group that outdoes the west coasters ... in decibels".)

The Doors' self-titled debut album (January 1967) is notable for possessing a darker sound and subject matter than many contemporary psychedelic albums, which would become very influential to the later gothic rock movement. Aided by the No. 1 single, "Light My Fire", the album became very successful, reaching number 2 on the Billboard chart.

In February 1967, the Beatles released the double A-side single "Strawberry Fields Forever" / "Penny Lane", which Ian MacDonald says launched both the "English pop-pastoral mood" typified by bands such as Pink Floyd, Family, Traffic and Fairport Convention, and English psychedelia's LSD-inspired preoccupation with "nostalgia for the innocent vision of a child". The Mellotron parts on "Strawberry Fields Forever" remain the most celebrated example of the instrument on a pop or rock recording. According to Simonelli, the two songs heralded the Beatles' brand of Romanticism as a central tenet of psychedelic rock.

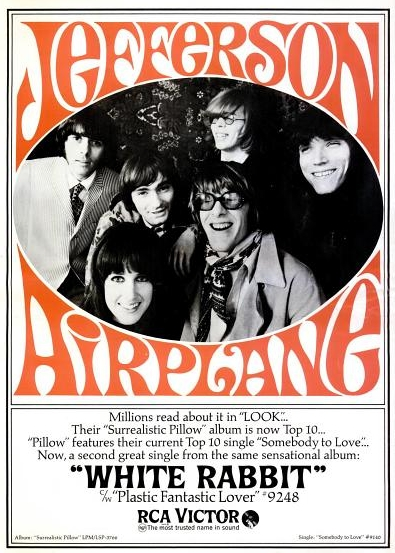
Poster for Jefferson Airplane's song "White Rabbit", which describes the surreal world of Alice in Wonderland

Jefferson Airplane's Surrealistic Pillow (February 1967) was one of the first albums to come out of San Francisco that sold well enough to bring national attention to the city's music scene. The LP tracks "White Rabbit" and "Somebody to Love" subsequently became top 10 hits in the US.

The Hollies psychedelic B-side "All the World Is Love" (February 1967) was released as the flipside to the hit single "On a Carousel".

Pink Floyd's "Arnold Layne" (March 1967) and "See Emily Play" (June 1967), both written by Syd Barrett, helped set the pattern for pop-psychedelia in the UK. There, "underground" venues like the UFO Club, Middle Earth Club, The Roundhouse, the Country Club and the Art Lab drew capacity audiences with psychedelic rock and ground-breaking liquid light shows. A major figure in the development of British psychedelia was the American promoter and record producer Joe Boyd, who moved to London in 1966. He co-founded venues including the UFO Club, produced Pink Floyd's "Arnold Layne", and went on to manage folk and folk rock acts including Nick Drake, the Incredible String Band and Fairport Convention.

Psychedelic rock's popularity accelerated following the release of the Beatles' album Sgt. Pepper's Lonely Hearts Club Band (May 1967) and the staging of the Monterey Pop Festival in June. Sgt. Pepper was the first commercially successful work that critics recognised as a landmark aspect of psychedelia, and the Beatles' mass appeal meant that the record was played virtually everywhere. The album was highly influential on bands in the US psychedelic rock scene and its elevation of the LP format benefited the San Francisco bands. Among many changes brought about by its success, artists sought to imitate its psychedelic effects and devoted more time to creating their albums; the counterculture was scrutinised by musicians; and acts adopted its non-conformist sentiments.

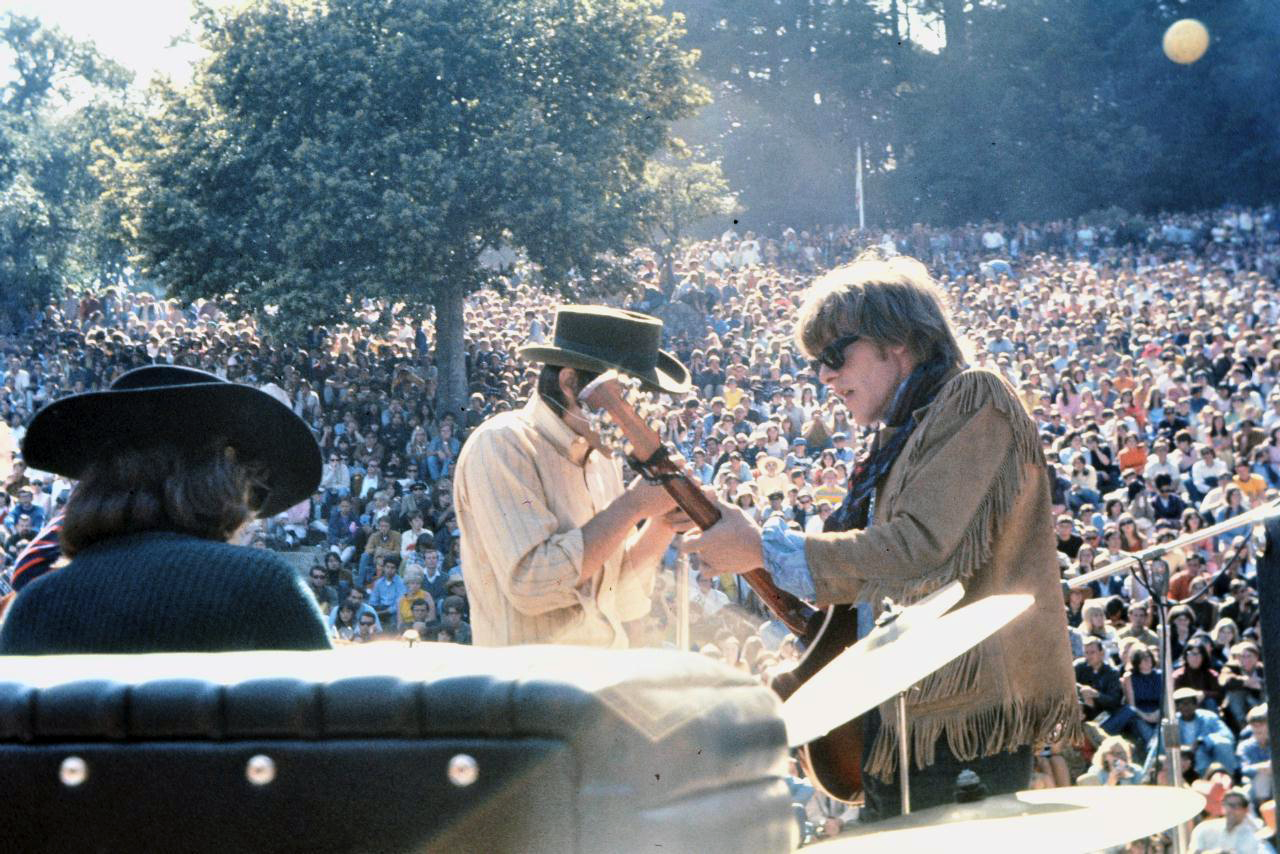
Spencer Dryden, Marty Balin, and Paul Kantner of Jefferson Airplane performing at the Fantasy Fair, early June 1967

The 1967 Summer of Love saw a huge number of young people from across America and the world travel to Haight-Ashbury, boosting the area's population from 15,000 to around 100,000. It was prefaced by the Human Be-In event in January and reached its peak at the Monterey Pop Festival in June, the latter helping to make major American stars of Janis Joplin, lead singer of Big Brother and the Holding Company, Jimi Hendrix, and the Who. Several established British acts joined the psychedelic revolution, including Eric Burdon (previously of the Animals) and the Who, whose The Who Sell Out (December 1967) included the psychedelic-influenced "I Can See for Miles" and "Armenia City in the Sky". Other major British Invasion acts who absorbed psychedelia in 1967 include the Hollies with the album Butterfly, and The Rolling Stones album Their Satanic Majesties Request. The Incredible String Band's The 5000 Spirits or the Layers of the Onion (July 1967) developed their folk music into a pastoral form of psychedelia.

Many famous established recording artists from the early rock era also fell under psychedelia and recorded psychedelic-inspired tracks, including Del Shannon's "Color Flashing Hair", Bobby Vee's "I May Be Gone", The Four Seasons' "Watch the Flowers Grow", Roy Orbison's "Southbound Jericho Parkway" and The Everly Brothers' "Mary Jane".

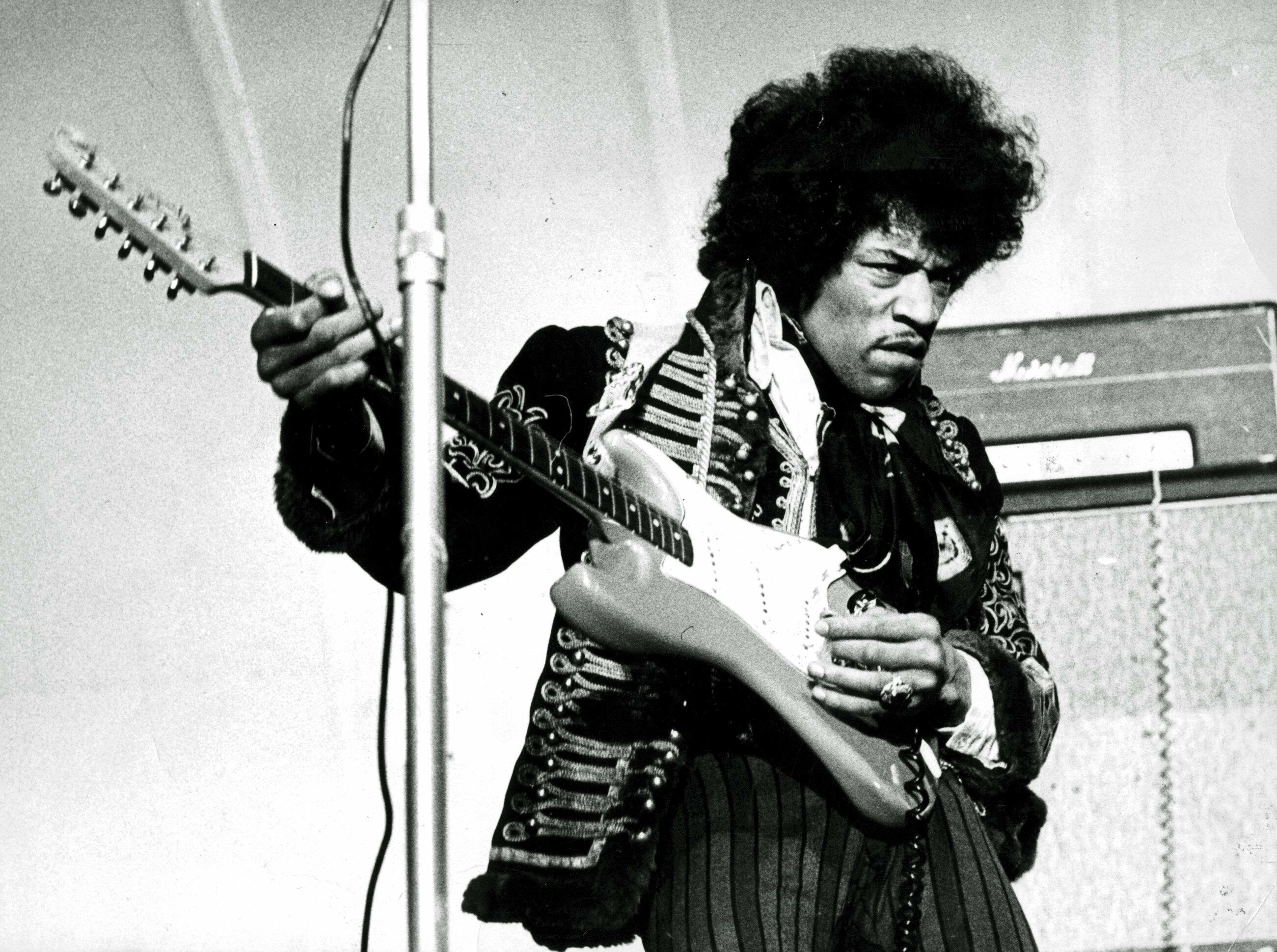
Jimi Hendrix on stage at Gröna Lund in Stockholm, Sweden in May 1967

According to author Edward Macan, there ultimately existed three distinct branches of British psychedelic music. The first, dominated by Cream, the Yardbirds and Hendrix, was founded on a heavy, electric adaptation of the blues played by the Rolling Stones, adding elements such as the Who's power chord style and feedback. The second, considerably more complex form drew strongly from jazz sources and was typified by Traffic, Colosseum, If, and Canterbury scene bands such as Soft Machine and Caravan. The third branch, represented by the Moody Blues, Pink Floyd, Procol Harum and the Nice, was influenced by the later music of the Beatles. Several of the post-Sgt. Pepper English psychedelic groups developed the Beatles' classical influences further than either the Beatles or contemporaneous West Coast psychedelic bands. Among such groups, the Pretty Things abandoned their R&B roots to create S.F. Sorrow (December 1968), one of the earliest examples of a rock opera. (Note: Prendergast cites Family's Music in a Doll's House (July 1968) as a "quintessential UK psychedelic album", combining a wealth of orchestral and rock instrumentation.)

==== International variants ====
The US and UK were the major centres of psychedelic music, but in the late 1960s scenes developed across the world, including continental Europe, Australasia, Asia and south and Central America. In the later 1960s psychedelic scenes developed in a large number of countries in continental Europe, including the Netherlands with bands like The Outsiders, Denmark, where it was pioneered by Steppeulvene, Yugoslavia, with bands like Kameleoni, Dogovor iz 1804., Pop Mašina and Igra Staklenih Perli, and Germany, where musicians fused music of psychedelia and the electronic avant-garde. 1968 saw the first major German rock festival, the Internationale Essener Songtage in Essen, and the foundation of the Zodiak Free Arts Lab in Berlin by Hans-Joachim Roedelius, and Conrad Schnitzler, which helped bands like Tangerine Dream and Amon Düül achieve cult status.

A thriving psychedelic music scene in Cambodia, influenced by psychedelic rock and soul broadcast by US forces radio in Vietnam, was pioneered by artists such as Sinn Sisamouth and Ros Serey Sothea. In South Korea, Shin Jung-Hyeon, often considered the godfather of Korean rock, played psychedelic-influenced music for the American soldiers stationed in the country. Following Shin Jung-Hyeon, the band San Ul Lim (Mountain Echo) often combined psychedelic rock with a more folk sound. In Turkey, Anatolian rock artist Erkin Koray blended classic Turkish music and Middle Eastern themes into his psychedelic-driven rock, helping to found the Turkish rock scene with artists such as Cem Karaca, Mogollar, Barış Manço and Erkin Koray. In Brazil, the Tropicalia movement merged Brazilian and African rhythms with psychedelic rock. Musicians who were part of the movement include Caetano Veloso, Gilberto Gil, Os Mutantes, Gal Costa, Tom Zé, and the poet/lyricist Torquato Neto, all of whom participated in the 1968 album Tropicália: ou Panis et Circencis, which served as a musical manifesto.

=== 1969–1971: Decline ===
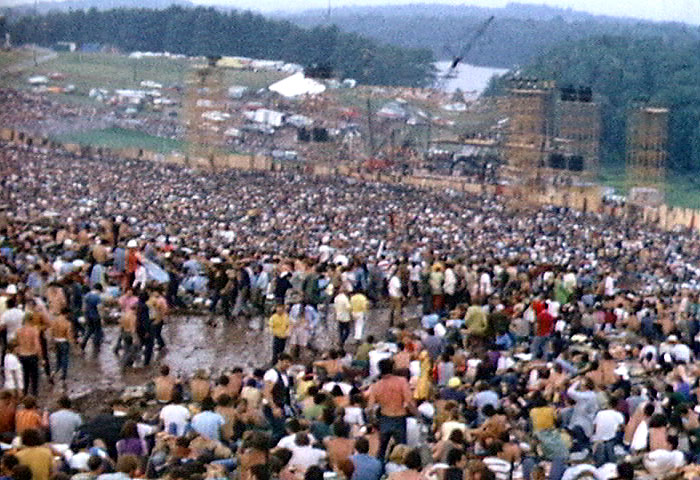
The stage at the Woodstock Festival in 1969

By the end of the 1960s, psychedelic rock was in retreat. Psychedelic trends climaxed in the 1969 Woodstock Festival, which saw performances by most of the major psychedelic acts, including Jimi Hendrix, Jefferson Airplane and the Grateful Dead. LSD had been made illegal in the United Kingdom in September 1966 and in California in October; by 1967, it was outlawed throughout the United States. In 1969, the murders of Sharon Tate and Leno and Rosemary LaBianca by Charles Manson and his cult of followers, claiming to have been inspired by The Beatles' songs such as "Helter Skelter", has been seen as contributing to an anti-hippie backlash. At the end of the same year, the Altamont Free Concert in California, headlined by the Rolling Stones, became notorious for the fatal stabbing of black teenager Meredith Hunter by Hells Angels security guards.

George Clinton's ensembles Funkadelic and Parliament and their various spin-offs took psychedelia and funk to create their own unique style, producing over forty singles, including three in the US top ten, and three platinum albums.

Brian Wilson of the Beach Boys, Brian Jones of the Rolling Stones, Peter Green and Danny Kirwan of Fleetwood Mac, Skip Spence of Jefferson Airplane and Moby Grape, and Syd Barrett of Pink Floyd suffered permanent brain damage from the use of hallucinogens, with their departures helping to shift the focus of the respective bands of which they had been leading figures. Some groups, such as the Beatles, the Jimi Hendrix Experience and Cream, broke up. Hendrix died in London in September 1970, shortly after recording Band of Gypsys (1970), Janis Joplin died of a heroin overdose in October 1970 and they were closely followed by Jim Morrison of the Doors, who died in Paris in July 1971. By this point, many surviving acts had moved away from psychedelia into either more back-to-basics "roots rock", traditional-based, pastoral or whimsical folk, the wider experimentation of progressive rock, or riff-based heavy rock.

Record executive Mike Curb was instrumental in having musicians who were promoting drug use dropped from or forced out of MGM Records, where Curb was employed in 1970, replacing them with acts not known for drug use but were known for their conservative appeal, most prominently the Osmonds.

== Revivals and successors ==
=== Psychedelic soul ===
Following the lead of Hendrix in rock, psychedelia influenced African American musicians, particularly the stars of the Motown label. This psychedelic soul was influenced by the civil rights movement, giving it a darker and more political edge than much psychedelic rock. Building on the funk sound of James Brown, it was pioneered from about 1968 by Sly and the Family Stone and The Temptations. Acts that followed them into this territory included Edwin Starr and the Undisputed Truth. George Clinton's interdependent Funkadelic and Parliament ensembles and their various spin-offs took the genre to its most extreme lengths, making funk almost a religion in the 1970s, producing over forty singles, including three in the US top ten, and three platinum albums.

While psychedelic rock wavered at the end of the 1960s, psychedelic soul continued into the 1970s, peaking in popularity in the early years of the decade, and only disappearing in the late 1970s as tastes changed. Songwriter Norman Whitfield wrote psychedelic soul songs for The Temptations and Marvin Gaye.

=== Prog, heavy metal, and krautrock ===
Many of the British musicians and bands that had embraced psychedelia went on to create progressive rock in the 1970s, including Pink Floyd, Soft Machine and members of Yes. The Moody Blues album In Search of the Lost Chord (1968), which is steeped in psychedelia, including prominent use of Indian instruments, is noted as an early predecessor to and influence on the emerging progressive movement. King Crimson's album In the Court of the Crimson King (1969) has been seen as an important link between psychedelia and progressive rock. While bands such as Hawkwind maintained an explicitly psychedelic course into the 1970s, most dropped the psychedelic elements in favour of wider experimentation. The incorporation of jazz into the music of bands like Soft Machine and Can also contributed to the development of the jazz rock of bands like Colosseum. As they moved away from their psychedelic roots and placed increasing emphasis on electronic experimentation, German bands like Kraftwerk, Tangerine Dream, Can, Neu! and Faust developed a distinctive brand of electronic rock, known as kosmische musik, or in the British press as "Kraut rock". The adoption of electronic synthesisers, pioneered by Popol Vuh from 1970, together with the work of figures like Brian Eno (for a time the synth player with Roxy Music), would be a major influence on subsequent electronic rock.

Psychedelic rock, with its distorted guitar sound, extended solos and adventurous compositions, has been seen as an important bridge between blues-oriented rock and later heavy metal. American bands whose loud, repetitive psychedelic rock emerged as early heavy metal included the Amboy Dukes and Steppenwolf. From England, two former guitarists with the Yardbirds, Jeff Beck and Jimmy Page, moved on to form key acts in the genre, The Jeff Beck Group and Led Zeppelin respectively. Other major pioneers of the genre had begun as blues-based psychedelic bands, including Black Sabbath, Deep Purple, Judas Priest and UFO. Psychedelic music also contributed to the origins of glam rock, with Marc Bolan changing his psychedelic folk duo into rock band T. Rex and becoming the first glam rock star from 1970. From 1971 David Bowie moved on from his early psychedelic work to develop his Ziggy Stardust persona, incorporating elements of professional make up, mime and performance into his act.

The jam band movement, which began in the late 1980s, was influenced by the Grateful Dead's improvisational and psychedelic musical style. The Vermont band Phish developed a sizable and devoted fan following during the 1990s, and were described as "heirs" to the Grateful Dead after the death of Jerry Garcia in 1995.

Emerging in the 1990s, stoner rock combined elements of psychedelic rock and doom metal. Typically using a slow-to-mid tempo and featuring low-tuned guitars in a bass-heavy sound, with melodic vocals, and 'retro' production, it was pioneered by the Californian bands Kyuss and Sleep. Modern festivals focusing on psychedelic music include Austin Psych Fest in Texas, founded in 2008, Liverpool Psych Fest, and Desert Daze in Southern California.

=== Neo-psychedelia ===
There were occasional mainstream acts that dabbled in neo-psychedelia, a style of music which emerged in late 1970s post-punk circles. Although it has mainly been an influence on alternative and indie rock bands, neo-psychedelia sometimes updated the approach of 1960s psychedelic rock. Neo-psychedelia may include forays into psychedelic pop, jangly guitar rock, heavily distorted free-form jams, or recording experiments. Some of the scene's bands, including the Soft Boys, the Teardrop Explodes, Wah!, Echo & the Bunnymen, became major figures of neo-psychedelia. In the US in the early 1980s it was joined by the Paisley Underground movement, based in Los Angeles and fronted by acts such as The Three O'Clock, Dream Syndicate, the Bangles and Rain Parade.

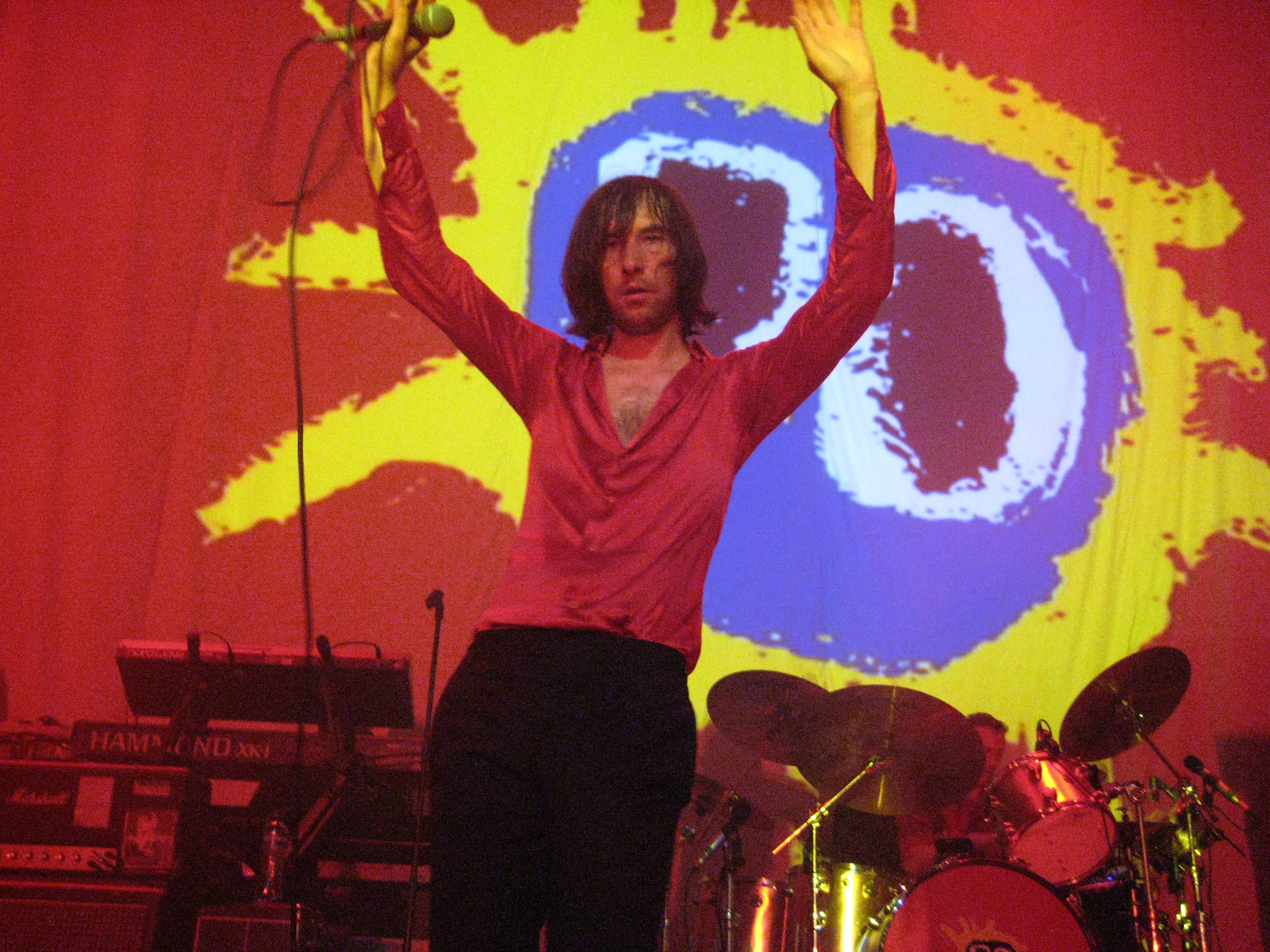
Primal Scream performing live with the cover of their album Screamadelica in the back

In the late '80s in the UK the genre of Madchester emerged in the Manchester area, in which artists merged alternative rock with acid house and dance culture as well as other sources, including psychedelic music and 1960s pop. The label was popularised by the British music press in the early 1990s. Erchard talks about it as being part of a "thread of 80s psychedelic rock" and lists as main bands in it the Stone Roses, Happy Mondays and Inspiral Carpets. The rave-influenced scene is widely seen as heavily influenced by drugs, especially ecstasy (MDMA), and it is seen by Erchard as central to a wider phenomenon of what he calls a "rock rave crossover" in the late '80s and early '90s UK indie scene, which also included the Screamadelica album by Scottish band Primal Scream.

In the 1990s, Elephant 6 collective bands such as The Olivia Tremor Control and The Apples in Stereo mixed the genre with lo-fi influences.

Later according to Treblezine's Jeff Telrich: "Primal Scream made [neo-psychedelia] dancefloor ready. The Flaming Lips and Spiritualized took it to orchestral realms. And Animal Collective—well, they kinda did their own thing."

== See also ==
- List of electric blues musicians
- List of psychedelic rock artists

== Notes, references, sources ==
=== Bibliography ===
- Bellman, Jonathan (1998). The Exotic in Western Music. Lebanon, NH: University Press of New England. ISBN 1-55553-319-1.
- Bennett, Graham (2005). Soft Machine: Out-bloody-rageous. SAF. ISBN 978-0-946719-84-6.
- Bogdanov, Vladimir; Woodstra, Chris; Erlewine, Stephen Thomas, eds. (2002). All Music Guide to Rock: The Definitive Guide to Rock, Pop, and Soul. Backbeat Books. ISBN 978-0-87930-653-3.
- Brend, Mark (2005). Strange Sounds: Offbeat Instruments and Sonic Experiments in Pop. Hal Leonard Corporation. ISBN 978-0-87930-855-1.
- Butler, Jan (2014). "Album Art and Posters: The Psychedelic Interplay of Rock Art and Art Rock". In Shephard, Tim; Leonard, Anne (eds.). The Routledge Companion to Music and Visual Culture. New York: Routledge. ISBN 978-0-415-62925-6.
- Case, George (2010). Out of Our Heads: Rock 'n' Roll Before the Drugs Wore Off. Milwaukee, WI: Backbeat Books. ISBN 978-0-87930-967-1.
- DeRogatis, Jim (2003). Turn on Your Mind: Four Decades of Great Psychedelic Rock. Milwaukee, WI: Hal Leonard. ISBN 978-0-634-05548-5.
- Echard, William (2017). Psychedelic Popular Music: A History through Musical Topic Theory. Bloomington, IN: Indiana University Press. ISBN 978-0-253-02659-0.
- Gilliland, John (1969). "The Acid Test: Psychedelics and a sub-culture emerge in San Francisco" (audio). Pop Chronicles. University of North Texas Libraries.
- Hicks, Michael (2000). Sixties Rock: Garage, Psychedelic, and Other Satisfactions. Urbana, IL: University of Illinois Press. ISBN 978-0-252-06915-4.
- Hoffmann, Frank (2004). Encyclopedia of Recorded Sound. Routledge. ISBN 978-1-135-94950-1.
- Hoffmann, Frank (2016). Chronology of American Popular Music, 1900-2000. Routledge. ISBN 978-1-135-86886-4.
- Hoffmann, Frank W.; Bailey, William G. (1990). Arts & Entertainment Fads. Binghamton, New York: The Haworth Press. ISBN 0-86656-881-6.
- Jackson, Andrew Grant (2015). 1965: The Most Revolutionary Year in Music. New York: Thomas Dunne Books. ISBN 978-1-250-05962-8.
- Kitts, Jeff; Tolinski, Brad (2002). Guitar World Presents Nu-metal. Hal Leonard Corporation. ISBN 9780634032875 – via Internet Archive.
- Lambert, Philip (2007). Inside the Music of Brian Wilson: The Songs, Sounds, and Influences of the Beach Boys' Founding Genius. Bloomsbury Publishing. ISBN 978-1-4411-0748-0.
- Larson, Tom (2004). History of Rock and Roll. Kendall Hunt. ISBN 978-0-7872-9969-9.
- Lavezzoli, Peter (2006). The Dawn of Indian Music in the West. New York: Continuum. ISBN 0-8264-2819-3.
- Levy, Shawn (2002). Ready, Steady, Go!: Swinging London and the Invention of Cool. London: Fourth Estate. ISBN 978-1-84115-226-4.
- Macan, Edward (1997). Rocking the Classics: English Progressive Rock and the Counterculture. Oxford University Press. ISBN 978-0-19-509887-7.
- MacDonald, Ian (1998). Revolution in the Head: The Beatles' Records and the Sixties. London: Pimlico. ISBN 978-0-7126-6697-8.
- McEneaney, Kevin T. (2009). Tom Wolfe's America: Heroes, Pranksters, and Fools. ABC-CLIO. ISBN 978-0-313-36545-4.
- Miles, Barry (2005). Hippie. Sterling. ISBN 978-1-4027-2873-0.
- Misiroglu, Gina (2015). American Countercultures: An Encyclopedia of Nonconformists, Alternative Lifestyles, and Radical Ideas in U.S. History. Routledge. ISBN 9781317477297.
- Nagelberg, Kenneth M. (2001). "Acid Rock". In Browne, Ray B.; Browne, Pat (eds.). The Guide to United States Popular Culture. Madison, Wisconsin: University of Wisconsin Press. ISBN 978-0-87972-821-2.
- Perry, Charles (1984). The Haight-Ashbury: A History. New York: Random House/Rolling Stone Press. ISBN 978-0-394-41098-2.
- Philo, Simon (2015). British Invasion: The Crosscurrents of Musical Influence. Lanham, Maryland: Rowman & Littlefield. ISBN 978-0-8108-8627-8.
- Pinch, Trevor; Trocco, Frank (2009). Analog Days: The Invention and Impact of the Moog Synthesizer. Cambridge, MA: Harvard University Press. ISBN 978-0-674-04216-2.
- Power, Martin (2011). Hot Hired Guitar: The Life of Jeff Beck. London: Omnibus Press. ISBN 978-1-84938-869-6.
- Prendergast, Mark (2003). The Ambient Century: From Mahler to Moby – The Evolution of Sound in the Electronic Age. New York: Bloomsbury. ISBN 1-58234-323-3.
- Prown, Pete; Newquist, Harvey P. (1997). Legends of Rock Guitar: The Essential Reference of Rock's Greatest Guitarists. Hal Leonard. ISBN 978-0-7935-4042-6.
- Reising, Russell (2002). "Introduction: 'Of the beginning'". In Reising, Russell (ed.). 'Every Sound There Is': The Beatles' Revolver and the Transformation of Rock and Roll. Farnham, UK: Ashgate Publishing. ISBN 978-0-7546-0557-7.
- Reising, Russell; LeBlanc, Jim (2009). "Magical Mystery Tours, and Other Trips: Yellow submarines, newspaper taxis, and the Beatles' psychedelic years". In Womack, Kenneth (ed.). The Cambridge Companion to the Beatles. Cambridge, UK: Cambridge University Press. ISBN 978-0-521-68976-2.
- Romanowski, Patricia; George-Warren, Holly, eds. (1995). The New Rolling Stone Encyclopedia of Rock & Roll. New York: Fireside/Rolling Stone Press. ISBN 0-684-81044-1.
- Russo, Greg (2016). Yardbirds: The Ultimate Rave-Up. Floral Park, New York: Crossfire Publications. ISBN 978-0-9791845-7-4.
- Savage, Jon (2015). 1966: The Year the Decade Exploded. London: Faber & Faber. ISBN 978-0-571-27763-6.
- Shaw, Arnold (1969). The Rock Revolution. New York: Crowell-Collier Press. ISBN 978-0-02-782400-1.
- Simonelli, David (2013). Working Class Heroes: Rock Music and British Society in the 1960s and 1970s. Lanham, Maryland: Lexington Books. ISBN 978-0-7391-7051-9.
- Smith, Chris (2009). 101 Albums That Changed Popular Music. New York: Oxford University Press. ISBN 978-0-19-537371-4.
- Turner, Steve (2016). Beatles '66: The Revolutionary Year. New York: Ecco. ISBN 978-0-06-247558-9.
- Unterberger, Richie (2002). "Psychedelic Rock". In Bogdanov, Vladimir; Woodstra, Chris; Erlewine, Stephen Thomas (eds.). All Music Guide to Rock: The Definitive Guide to Rock, Pop, and Soul (3rd ed.). San Francisco: Backbeat Books. ISBN 978-0-87930-653-3.
- Unterberger, Richie (2003). Eight Miles High: Folk-Rock's Flight from Haight-Ashbury to Woodstock. San Francisco: Backbeat Books. ISBN 0-87930-743-9.
