= Hebraization of surnames =

Adoption of Hebrew-language Jewish surnames

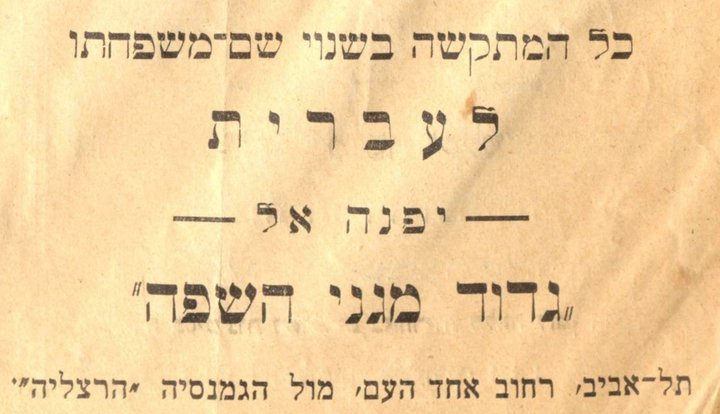
Poster in the Yishuv offering assistance to Palestinian Jews in choosing a Hebrew name for themselves, 2 December 1926

The Hebraization of surnames (also Hebraicization; Hebrew: עִבְרוּת Ivrut) is the act of amending one's Jewish surname, so that it is tied to the Hebrew language, which was natively spoken by Jews and Samaritans until it died out of everyday use by around 200 CE. For many Jews of diaspora and Palestinian origin, immigration to the land of Israel and taking up a Hebrew surname has long been conceptualized as a way to erase remnants of their diaspora oppression, particularly since the inception of Zionism in the 19th century. This notion, which was part of what drove the revival of the Hebrew language, was further consolidated after the founding of Israel in 1948.

Hebraizing surnames has been an especially common practice among Ashkenazi Jews; many Ashkenazi families had acquired permanent surnames (rather than patronyms) only when surnames were forced upon them by Emperor Joseph II of the Holy Roman Empire following an official decree on 12 November 1787. Sephardic Jews often had hereditary family names (e.g., Cordovero, Abrabanel, Shaltiel, de Leon, Alcalai, Toledano, Lopez) since well before the Spanish expulsion of Jews near the end of the Reconquista, which had begun after the Muslim conquest of the Iberian Peninsula in the 8th century.

After the extinction of Hebrew as a day-to-day spoken language, Hebrew surnames were not the norm among Jews in parts of the diaspora and the Holy Land, to a debated extent. Common examples of those that persisted include Cohen (כֹּהֵן, lit. 'kohen'), Moss (מֹשֶׁה, lit. 'Moses'), and Levi (לוי, lit. 'Levite'). Several Hebrew surnames, such as Katz (כּ״ץ, abbr. ‘kohen tzedek’, ‘cohen Zedek’, or ‘kahane tzedek’ or kohen tzadok, lit. 'righteous Kohen (or Cohen)' or 'Kahane the just' or 'priest of Zadok') and Bogoraz (abbr. Ben ha-Rav Zalman, from בן הרב זאַלמאַן, lit. 'son of Rabbi Zalman') are, in fact, Hebrew acronyms, despite being commonly perceived as being of non-Jewish origin (in these cases, from German and Russian, respectively).

Hebraization began as early as the days of the First Aliyah. The widespread trend towards Hebraization of surnames in the days of the Yishuv (i.e., Palestinian Jews) and after Israel's founding was based on the idea of returning to an authentic Jewish identity and thus having a stronger sense of one's Jewishness. Likewise, it was also tied in with the desire among diaspora Jews to distance themselves from the lost and dead past of exile and also from the imposition upon Jews of foreign names in previous centuries.

The process of Hebraization among the Jews of Diaspora and Palestinian origin has continued since Israel's founding in 1948; among the thousands of olim and olot who currently apply for legal name changes in Israel each year, many do so to adopt Hebrew names and thereby assimilate into a shared Jewish national identity.

== History ==
=== In the Yishuv ===
Among the Yishuv (the first to return to the land of Israel), there was a strong feeling of sh'lilat ha-golah (Hebrew: שלילת הגולה "negation of the diaspora/Exile"), which often included the exchange of Diaspora surnames for purely Hebrew ones. In addition to aliyah, the Zionist movement also wanted to create an image of an empowered Israeli Jew that would be different from the stereotypical perception of oppressed Yiddish-speaking, shtetl-living Diaspora Jews, and these things were a significant part of the people of the First and Second Aliyot. Some of the immigrants of the First Aliyah (1882–1903) Hebraized their surnames, and the practice became widespread during the Second Aliyah (1904–1914).

==== Booklet by the Jewish Agency ====
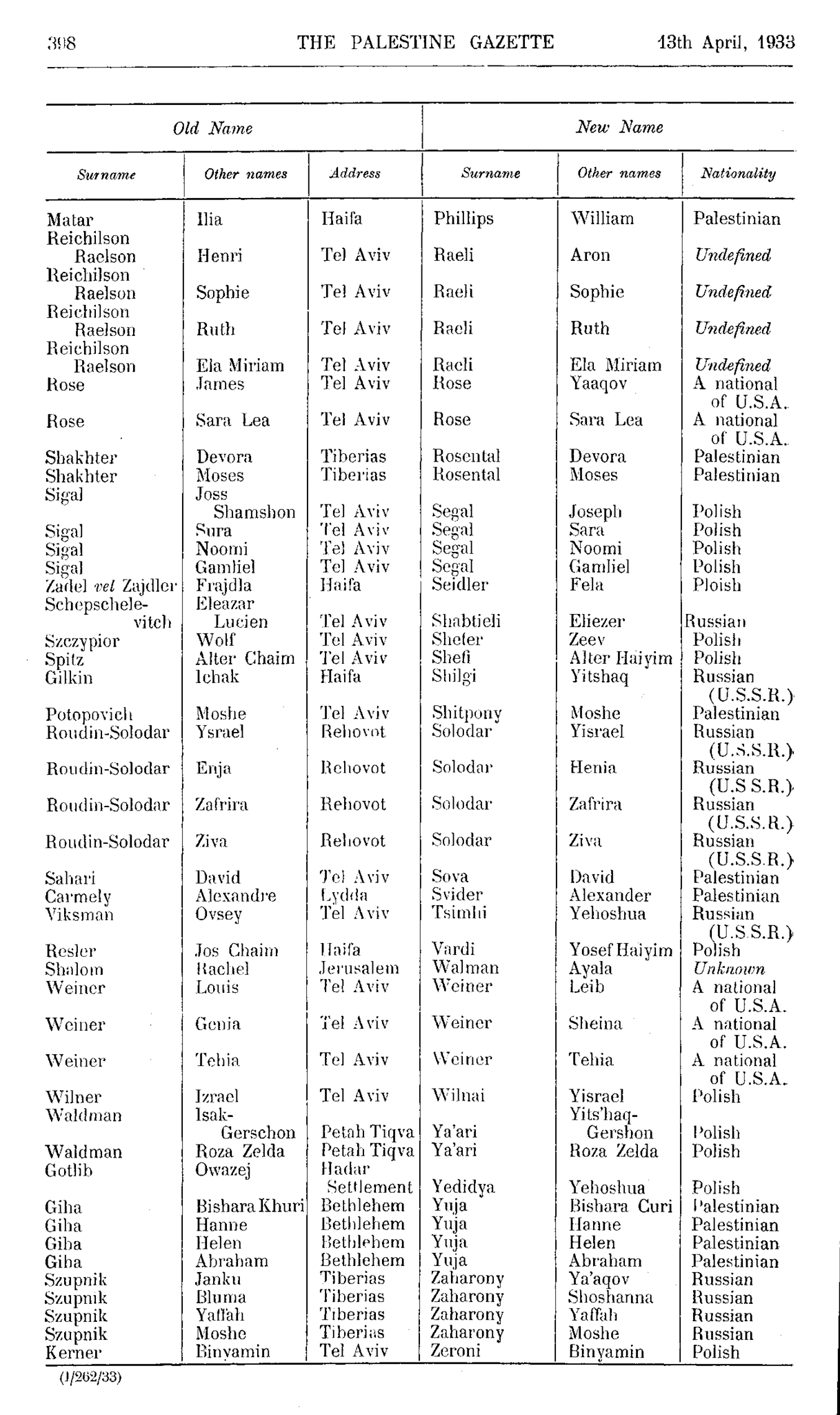
Some but not all name changes were recorded in the Palestine Gazette

This process started with individuals like Eliezer Ben-Yehuda (Perelman) and was adopted by the New Yishuv. In 1944, before the founding of the State of Israel, the Zionist leadership and the Jewish National Council proclaimed it the "Year of naturalization and the Hebrew name". A special committee under the chairmanship of Mordechai Nemzabi, the Jewish Agency advisor on matters of civilian defense, published a booklet which contained guidelines on the creation on new Hebrew surnames.

Changing a diaspora surname to Hebrew

1. Change of vocalization: Leib becomes Lev
2. Change of consonants: Borg or Brog becomes Barak
3. Shortening by omitting the ending: Rosenberg becomes Rosen
4. Shortening a name with a Hebrew meaning, by omitting the foreign suffix: Yakobovitch (Jacobowitz, Jacobowicz) becomes Ya'akovi
5. Translating the foreign name into Hebrew according to the meaning: Abramovich (Abramowicz, Abramowitz) becomes Ben Avraham.

First names as surnames

1. Name of a father or mother who was murdered during the Shoah, thus: Bat Miriam, Ben Moshe, Devorin
2. Son or daughter who fell in battle: Avinoam
3. Brother or sister who was killed or fell: Achimeir
4. Beloved or admired biblical figure: Shaul, Davidi

Change of names by names of places, plants, or sites in the Land of Israel

1. Places or sites: Hermoni, Eilat, Gilad
2. Plants, especially plants of the Land of Israel: Eshel ("orchard", "garden"), Rotem ("retama")

=== After the Israeli Declaration of Independence ===
After the Israeli Declaration of Independence, there was still the attitude that the Hebraization of family names should continue, in order to get rid of names with a diaspora sound. Hebraization of names became a typical part of the integration process for new immigrants among Ashkenazi Jews. It also occurred among Sephardi and Mizrahi Jewish immigrants from Arab and Muslim lands, though it was less common among them than among Ashkenazi Jews; Sephardi and Mizrahi children were typically given new Hebrew first names in school, often without permission from their parents.

David Ben-Gurion, the first Prime Minister of Israel, was committed to the use of the Hebrew language (he changed his surname from Grün to Ben-Gurion, a reference to Judean provisional government leader Joseph ben Gurion). He tried to convince as many people to change their surnames into "real" Hebrew ones. Ben-Gurion got Herzl Rosenblum to sign the Israeli Declaration of Independence as Herzl Vardi, his pen name (later changed to his legal name), as Ben-Gurion wanted more Hebrew names on the document. Nine more of the signatories of the document would then go on to Hebraize their names, as well.

Ben-Gurion, in an order to the Israel Defense Forces soldiers, wrote, "It is desirable that every commanding officer (from Squadron Commander to Chief of Staff) should change his surname, whether German, English, Slavic, French or foreign in general, to a Hebrew surname, in order to be a role model for his soldiers. The Israel Defense Forces must be Hebrew in spirit, vision, and in all internal and external expressions." For a while it was widespread for new conscripts into the Israel Defense Forces with Ashkenazi surnames to Hebraize their names upon entering service. For example, former Israeli Prime Minister Ehud Barak changed his surname from Brog to Barak in 1972.

A binding order of the same issue was issued to the officials of the state in 1950, and particularly to those who represented the State abroad. A "Committee for Hebrew Names" was established to supervise the implementation of the order, whose task was to assist and advise the choice of a Hebrew name.

In addition to pressure from the state, tensions between Jewish ethnic groups caused some people to Hebraize their names to dis-identify with a "stigmatized" ethnic group or to merge into a "collective Israeli identity" and therefore created a desire to Hebraize.

== Supporters and opponents ==
The Hebraization of surnames was a source of debate in the days of the Yishuv and after the establishment of the State of Israel.

=== Pro-Hebraization ===
Among the most significant supporters was Yitzhak Ben-Zvi (née Shimshelevich), leader of the Labor movement, historian and second president of the State of Israel. He was born in Ukraine on 24 November 1884. He studied law in Istanbul together with David Ben-Gurion. In 1906 he attended the founding conference of the Poale Zion and in 1907 he settled in the Land of Israel. He belonged to the founders of the Ahdut ha-Avodah Party, was active in the Haganah, a member of the Jewish National Council, and signed the Israeli Declaration of Independence. Ben-Zvi died in 1963.

Ben-Zvi wrote:

Our surnames are mostly of foreign origin, which cling to exile [...] even names based on Hebrew first names were damaged and distorted from the original [...] by German and English suffixes, like "son" or "sohn" and the Slavic "in", "ovich", "ovsky" and "shvili". These surnames fill the air and the pages of our newspaper, the posters and announcements in our streets and public squares [...] it is indeed not really clear if the hardship of this inheritance which remained with us as a result of the Middle Ages and subsequent ghettoization should be tolerated...

— Yitzhak Ben-Zvi in Collected Writings, vol. 4, pp. 11–14

All rabbinic authorities encourage hebraizing first names (VaYikra Rabba 32, and Kor'ei Sh'mo, pp. 173–181), and some actively encourage last names, as well (Rabbi Shlomo Aviner, Resp. She'elat Shlomo VIII, 67–68), and even did so themselves: among them: Rabbis Menashe HaKatan (née Klein), Maharam Schick, Shlomo Goren (née Goronchick), Shaul Yisraeli (née Izraelit), Moshe-Zvi Neria (née Menkin), Shlomo Aviner (née Langenauer).

=== Anti-Hebraization ===
One of the opponents of the Hebraization of surnames was Moses Calvary, a writer and teacher. Born in Germany in 1883, he received a traditional, general, and rabbinical education. He was a member of Ahdut Ha'avodah, an educator in the Meir Shfeya youth village, principal of Gymnasia Rehavia in Jerusalem, and educator in the "Ahava" youth village in Kiryat Bialik.

Yitzhak Ben Zvi demands we disqualify all the foreign names which are close to us. His assumption was that our immigration to Eretz Yisrael is a revolutionary act, a return to one's origins. Let the memory of the Diaspora therefore be erased so that the crown be returned to ancient times, by wrapping our names in the envelope of our language. I have my doubts if this zealousness is appropriate. Our names are part—a significant part—of our history. Bearers of historical names are still alive and among us; the names of figures who mark our history—names like Sasportas or Benbenisti, Abrabanel or Don Yehia, Rappaport or Eibeschitz—there is no reason to delete the chronicle of our national life. Let us preserve the faith of our fathers also in our revival. Do not betray our memories by radical action; and the text does not only relate to the famous: the variety in our names is a sign of our colorful history, a two-thousand year-old history, whose traces cannot be wiped out light-handedly.

— Moses Calvary, Between Sowing and Harvest, p. 339

Some people were emotionally attached to their diaspora last name, for reasons such as it having noble yichus (origins), or for a desire to continue to identify with their ethnic group. There is a story of an Israeli diplomat who told David Ben-Gurion, "I will change my name if you can find me one non-Jew named Lifshitz." Others had names that were entirely Hebrew to begin with.

The disagreement about the Hebraization of surnames continued. Many people preserved their foreign surname, such as first President of Israel Chaim Weizmann, President of the Supreme Court of Israel Shimon Agranat, and others.

== Decline in Israel ==
This trend moderated with time. However, even today, people continue to Hebraize their surnames, especially those serving in the IDF and Israel's diplomatic missions, representing the State of Israel. The number of those who do is small but significant; about 15% of American and British immigrants to Israel who come on Nefesh B'Nefesh flights Hebraize their names on arrival.

There is also a trend of reverting to ancestral, non-Hebrew names to return to one's roots and preserve traditions unique to each ethnic group. There are people who re-adopt the name their family previously abandoned for the sake of "Israeliness", such as Israeli writer Yitzhak Orpaz who restored his family's original family name of "Averbuch".

== Processes of Hebraizing Jewish surnames ==
There were several ways people Hebraized their names.

Some names were words that were directly translated from the corresponding Diaspora name.

Old	New	English
Kirschenbaum	Duvdevani (Hebrew: דובדבני)	cherry tree (y)
Goldberg	Har-Zahav (הר־זהב)	gold mountain
Herbst	Stavi (סתווי)	autumn, fall
Her(t)z	Levavi (לבבי)	heart(y), cordial
Mostovski	Gashri (גשרי)	bridge(y)
Rosenstein	Even-Vered (אבן־ורד)	rose stone
Schlossberg	Har-Tira (הר־טירה)	castle mountain
Silver(man)	Kaspi (כספי)	silver, silversmith
Steinberg	Har-Even (הר־אבן)	stone mountain

Others were direct translations of patronymic names or names based on biblical figures.

Old	New
Benjamin	Binyamin (בנימין)
Davidson	Ben-David (בן־דוד)
Mendelson	Ben-Menachem (בן־מנחם) (Yiddish diminutive: Mendel)
Meyerson	Ben-Meir (בן־מאיר) (Yiddish: Meyer)
Reuben	Reuven (ראובן)
Simmons	Shimoni (שמעוני) (variant of Simeon)

Other names were translated from toponyms.

Old	New	English
Deutsch(er)	Ashkenazi (אשכנזי)	from Germany
Wilner	Vilnai (וילנאי)	from Wilno

Other names were the negation of so-called "Ekelnamen" (literally "disgusting names" in German, deliberately insulting or demeaning last names forced upon ancestors by non-Jewish officials).

Old	New
Ausuebel: "from evil"	Ben-Tov (בן־טוב): "from good", "born of goodness", "good son"
Luegner: "liar"	Amithai (אמיתי): "honest"

Other names were Hebraized on their similar sounding to a Hebrew word or name, though sometimes their phonetic similarity was far-fetched.

Old	New
Berkovitz: "son of Dov Ber"	Barak (ברק): "lightning"
Boris	Barukh (ברוך): "blessed"
Brotzlewsky	Bar-Lev (בר־לב): "able of Lev/heart"
Epstein (place name)	Eilat (אילת) (place name)
Gruen: "green"	Ben-Gurion (בן־גוריון): "son of the lion cub"
Kalb: "calf"	Gilboa (גלבוע) (place name)
Neumann: "new man"	Ne'eman (נאמן): "loyal"
Torczyner : "from Torczyn"	Tur-Sinai (טור־סיני): "columns of Sinai"

Sometimes, there were prevalent options between either translating it, or choosing a name based on similar sound (homophone).

Old	Direct translation choice	Phonetic similarity choice
Feld	Sadeh (שדה): "field"	Peled (פלד): "steel"
Rosen	Vardi (ורדי): "my rose"	Rozen (רוזן): "count/earl"
Shkolnik	Lamdan (למדן): "yeshiva student/learner"	Eshkol (אשכול): "cluster of grapes"
Gruen	Yarok (ירוק): "green"	Ben-Gurion (בן־גוריון): "son of the lion cub"

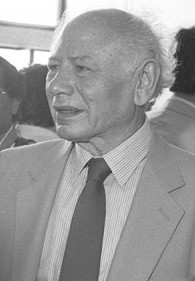
The historian Benzion Netanyahu, father of the eponymous Prime Minister, adopted the surname Netanyahu (meaning "given by God") as a replacement for his birth name Mileikowsky.

In some cases, a false cognate could satisfy both options at once.

Old	New
Loewe: "lion"	Lavi (לביא): "lion"
Lempel: "little lamp"	Lapid (לפיד): "torch"

Others chose completely newly chosen names, many times symbolic in nature.

Hebrew	English
Ben-Artzi (בן־ארצי)	"son of my land"
Nir (ניר)	"plowed field", as dug by a farmer

Others kept their name for several reasons. Sometimes, the reason it was kept was because of its religious nature. For examples, names connected with the kohen (priesthood) such as Cohen, Kohn, Kaplan, Sacerdoti, Katz, Azoulai, etc. Other times it indicated Levite descent such as Levi, Levy, Weil (anagram), and Segal (Hebrew acronym). Other times it was synagogue or Jewish community functions such as Gabbai, Chazan, or Rabin. Sometimes the surname was already Hebrew (Sarfati).

Others kept their name for its yichus (meaning that the person descends from something akin to "good stock"), which gave the bearer more reason not to Hebraize it. Examples include Horowitz (famous rabbinical dynasty), Rothschild (famous Jewish banking dynasty), Einstein (famous bearer), or Shaltiel (ancient Sephardic family tracing its origins to King David—and it is already Hebrew).

Others kept their name but the name underwent some mutation because they contained sounds that do not exist in Hebrew. Examples include Lando (from "Landau"), and Glober (from "Glauber").

Other "Diaspora" Jewish names are Hebrew to begin with (such as Ashkenazi and Yerushalmi), corruptions of Hebrew words (such as Heifetz, from Chafetz), Hebrew acronyms (such as Shalit, from "Sheyihye le'orekh yamim tovim"), or of Aramaic origin (such as Kahane, or Raban).

== See also ==
- Jewish name and Jewish surname
  - Hebrew name
- Jewish name change
