= Kassebaum =

Kassebaum is a surname of German origin. It may refer to:

- Kendra Kassebaum (born 1973), American actress
- Nancy Kassebaum (1932–2026), American politician
- Richard Kassebaum (1960–2008), American documentary filmmaker
- William Kassebaum (born 1962), American lawyer and politician

== See also ==
- Kirschbaum (disambiguation)
