= 1978 United States Senate election in Kansas =

- November 7, 1978
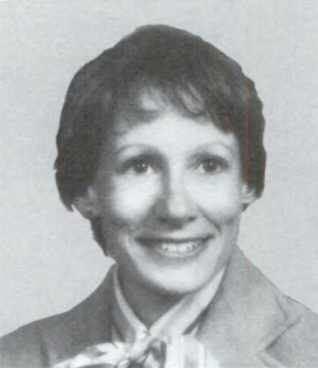

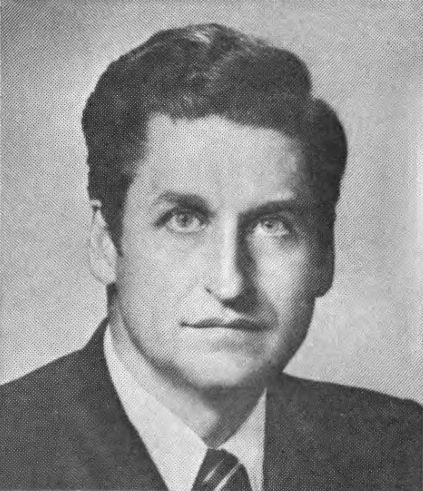
Nominee	Nancy Kassebaum	William R. Roy
Party	Republican	Democratic
Popular vote	403,354	317,602
Percentage	53.86%	42.41%
- County results Kassebaum: 40–50% 50–60% 60–70% 70–80% Roy: 40–50% 50–60%
U.S. senator before election
James B. Pearson
Republican
Elected U.S. Senator
Nancy Kassebaum
Republican

The 1978 United States Senate election in Kansas took place on November 7, 1978. Incumbent Republican Senator James B. Pearson did not run for re-election to a third full term.

Nancy Landon Kassebaum, the daughter of former Governor Alf Landon, won the election, defeating a large field of Republican candidates in the primary and Democratic former U.S. Representative William R. Roy in the general election.

Roy lost by a much smaller margin four years earlier against Kansas' other U.S. Senator, Bob Dole.

Kassebaum became the first woman elected to a full term in the Senate without her husband having previously served in Congress. In fact, at the time of the election, she was separated from her husband John Philip Kassebaum. Their divorce was finalized in 1979, making Kassebaum the first single divorcée to serve in the U.S. Senate.

== Republican primary ==
=== Candidates ===
- Wayne Angell, former State Representative from Ottawa
- L. C. Fitzjarrell, resident of Stilwell
- Norman Gaar, State Senator from Westwood
- Bill Gibbs, resident of Overland Park
- Sam Hardage, hotel executive from Wichita, Kansas
- Ken Henderson
- Nancy Landon Kassebaum, aide to retiring Senator Pearson and daughter of Alf Landon
- Jan Meyers, State Senator from Overland Park
- Deryl K. Schuster, resident of Shawnee

=== Results ===
1978 Republican Senate primary
Party	Candidate	Votes	%
Republican	Nancy Landon Kassebaum	67,324	30.58%
Republican	Wayne Angell	54,161	24.60%
Republican	Sam Hardage	30,248	13.74%
Republican	Jan Meyers	20,933	9.51%
Republican	Deryl K. Schuster	18,568	8.44%
Republican	Norman Gaar	14,502	6.59%
Republican	Ken Henderson	8,826	4.01%
Republican	Bill Gibbs	3,123	1.42%
Republican	L. C. Fitzjarrell	2,457	1.12%
Total votes		220,142	100.00%

== Democratic primary ==
=== Candidates ===
- James R. Maher, resident of Overland Park
- Roland Preboth, nominee for Secretary of State in 1964
- Bill Roy, former U.S. Representative and nominee for Senate in 1974
- Dorothy K. White, resident of Wichita

=== Results ===
1978 Democratic Senate primary
Party	Candidate	Votes	%
Democratic	Bill Roy	100,508	76.68%
Democratic	Dorothy K. White	13,865	10.58%
Democratic	James R. Maher	11,556	8.82%
Democratic	Roland W. Preboth	5,138	3.92%
Total votes		131,067	100.00%

Though he was defeated in the Democratic primary, James Maher ran in the general election as the nominee of the Conservative Party.

== General election ==
=== Results ===
General election results
Party	Candidate	Votes	%	±%
Republican	Nancy Kassebaum	403,354	53.86%	▼17.56
Democratic	Bill Roy	317,602	42.41%	▲19.38
Conservative	James R. Maher	22,497	3.00%	▼1.07
Prohibition	Russell Mikels	5,386	0.72%	▼0.76
Total votes		748,839	100.00%	

== See also ==
- 1978 United States Senate elections
