= Keith David on screen and stage =

The following is a list of performances done by American actor Keith David, who has done numerous roles across various films, television series, voice work, video games, and stage productions.

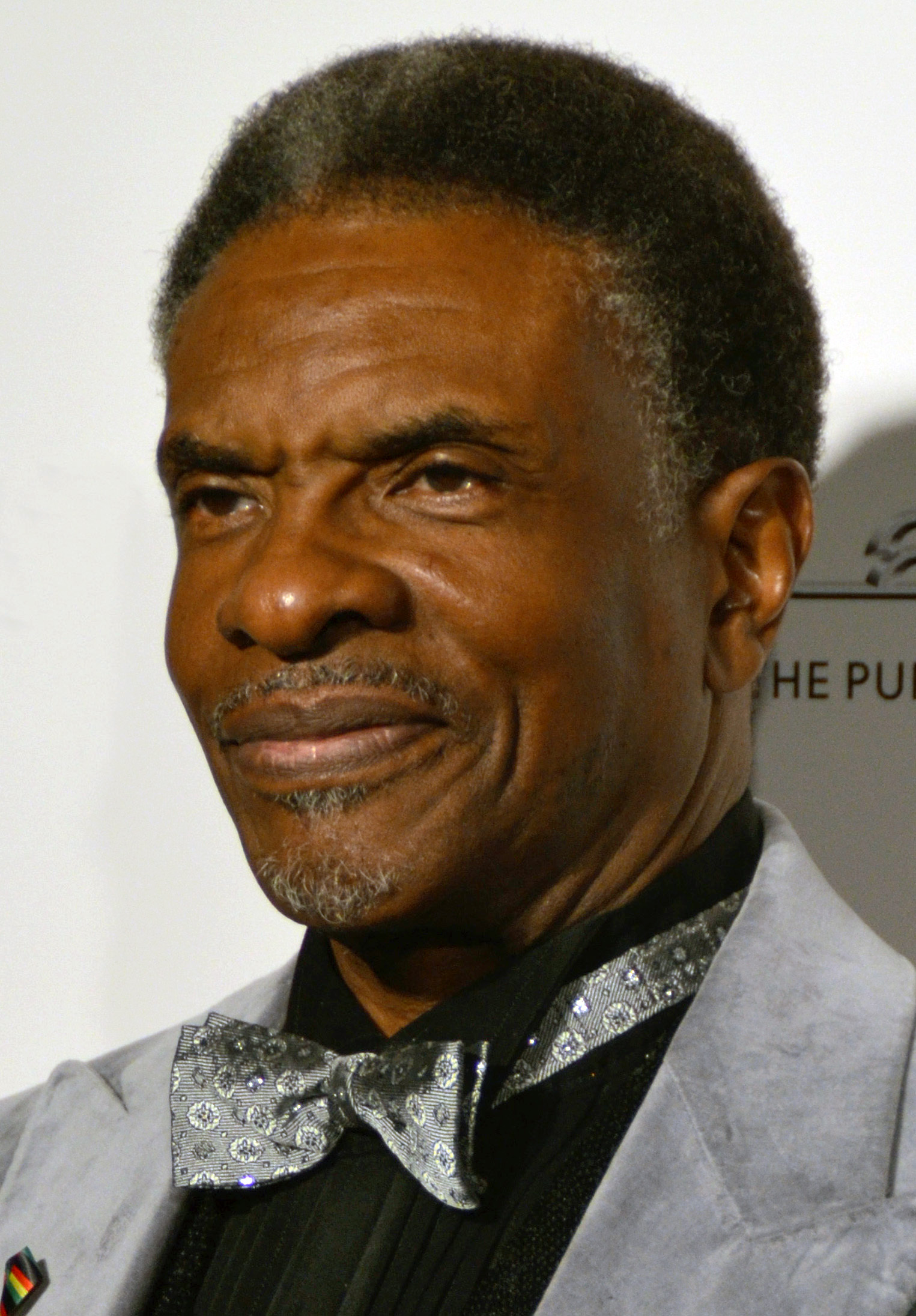
David in 2015

== Film ==
Key
†	Denotes films that have not yet been released

Year	Title	Role	Notes
1979	Disco Godfather	Club Patron	Uncredited
1982	The Thing	Childs	
1986	Platoon	King	
1986	The Whoopee Boys	Washington Square Peddler	
1987	Hot Pursuit	Alphonso	
1988	Braddock: Missing in Action III	Embassy Gate Captain	
1988	Off Limits	Maurice	
1988	Stars and Bars	Eugene Teagarden	
1988	Bird	Buster Smith	
1988	They Live	Frank	
1989	Road House	Ernie Bass	
1989	Always	"Powerhouse"	
1990	Men at Work	Louis Fedders	
1990	Marked for Death	Max Keller	
1992	Final Analysis	Detective Huggins	
1992	Nails	Noah Owens	
1992	Article 99	Luther Jermoe	
1994	Reality Bites	Roger	
1994	The Puppet Masters	Alex Holland	
1995	Clockers	Andre "The Giant" Ashley	
1995	Dead Presidents	Kirby	
1995	The Quick and the Dead	Sergeant Cantrell	
1995	Blue in the Face	Jackie Robinson	
1996	Loose Women	Stylist	
1996	The Grave	The Priest	
1996	Eye for an Eye	Martin	
1996	Larger than Life	Hurst	
1996	Never Met Picasso	Larry	
1996	Johns	Homeless John	
1997	Volcano	Police Lieutenant Ed Fox	
1997	Hercules	Apollo (voice)	
1997	Executive Target	Lamar	
1997	Flipping	Leo Richards	
1998	Armageddon	General Kimsey	
1998	There's Something About Mary	Charlie	
1999	Princess Mononoke	Okkoto (voice)	English dub
2000	Dark Summer	Detective Davis	
2000	Pitch Black	Abu "Imam" Al-Walid	
2000	Requiem for a Dream	Big Tim	
2000	Where the Heart Is	Moses Whitecotten	
2000	The Replacements	Lindell	
2001	Final Fantasy: The Spirits Within	Council Member #1 (voice)	
2001	Novocaine	Detective Lunt	
2001	Pretty When You Cry	Detective Charles Desett	
2002	29 Palms	The Sheriff	
2002	Barbershop	Lester Wallace	
2003	Kaena: The Prophecy	Voxem (voice)	English dub
2003	Agent Cody Banks	CIA Director	
2003	Head of State	Bernard Cooper	
2003	Hollywood Homicide	Captain Leon	
2003	The Hard Road	Narrator (voice)	Documentary
2003	Horatio's Drive: America's First Road Trip	Narrator (voice)	Documentary
2004	Agent Cody Banks 2: Destination London	CIA Director	
2004	The Chronicles of Riddick	Imam Abu Al-Walid (voice)	
2004	The Chronicles of Riddick: Dark Fury	Imam Abu Al-Walid (voice)	Direct-to-video
2004	Crash	Lieutenant Dixon	
2004	Beef II	Narrator (voice)	Documentary
2005	Mr. & Mrs. Smith	Father	
2005	Transporter 2	FBI Agent Stappleton	
2005	Dirty	Captain Spain	
2006	The Oh in Ohio	Coach Popovitch	
2006	Behind Enemy Lines II: Axis of Evil	MCPO Scott Boytano	Direct-to-video
2006	ATL	John Garnett	
2007	If I Had Known I Was a Genius	Dad	
2007	Delta Farce	Sergeant Kilgore	
2007	The Last Sentinel	Colonel Norton, Gun Voice 2 (voice)	
2008	Beautiful Loser	Morgan - Adult	
2008	First Sunday	Judge B. Bennet Galloway	
2008	Justice League: The New Frontier	The Centre (voice)	Direct-to-video
2008	Superhero Movie	The Chief of Police	
2008	My Mom's New Boyfriend	FBI Chief Conrad	
2008	The Fifth Commandment	Max "Coolbreeze" Templeton	
2008	No Bad Days	Terrence	
2008	The Sensei	The Minister	
2009	Behind Enemy Lines: Colombia	Commander Scott Boytano	Direct-to-video
2009	Coraline	The Cat (voice)	
2009	Against the Dark	Lieutenant Waters	Direct-to-video
2009	Charlie Valentine	Sal	
2009	Don McKay	Otis Kent	
2009	The Butcher	Larry Cobb	
2009	The Princess and the Frog	Doctor. Facilier (voice)	
2009	Gamer	Agent Keith	
2009	All About Steve	Corbitt	
2009	Pastor Brown	Pastor Brown	
2010	Death at a Funeral	Reverend Davis	
2010	Lottery Ticket	"Sweet Tee"	
2010	Chasing 3000	Officer L.	
2010	Stomp the Yard: Homecoming	Terry Harris	
2010	Something Like a Business	Sebastian	
2010	Chain Letter	Detective Jim Crenshaw	
2010	Meet Monica Velour	Claude	
2011	The Inheritance	Uncle Melvin	Also executive producer
2011	No Saints for Sinners	Victor	
2011	Spork	Coach Jenkins	
2011	The Greening of Whitney Brown	Clerk	
2011	Snowflake, the White Gorilla	Anvil	Voice, direct-to-video
2011	Hopelessly In June	Dalbert Myers	
2012	Cloud Atlas	Kupaka, Joe Napier, An-kor Apis, Prescient	
2012	Smiley	Diamond	
2012	Highway	Mustafa	
2012	Don't Pass Me By	David Knox	
2012	The Last Fall	Sydney Bishop	
2012	The Undershepherd	Brother Wilks	
2012	Christmas in Compton	Earl "Big Earl"	
2013	Assault on Wall Street	Freddy	
2013	Free Birds	Chief Broadbeak (voice)	
2013	The Frog Kingdom	Frog King (voice)	
2013	Sons of Liberty	Nathan Reynolds	
2013	H4	Worcester	
2014	Field of Lost Shoes	Old Judge	
2014	Secrets of the Magic City	Mr. Daniels	
2014	Birds of Paradise	Old Buzzard (voice)	Direct-to-video
2015	Kids vs Monsters	Barry	
2015	Boiling Pot	Agent Long	
2015	Huevos: Little Rooster's Egg-cellent Adventure	Don Alfonso (voice)	English dub
2015	Union Furnace	Pin Stripe	
2016	Range 15	Colonel Holloway	
2016	The Nice Guys	Older Guy	
2016	Nina	Clifton's Father	
2016	Dirty Lies	Doc	
2017	Savage Dog	Valentine	
2018	American Dresser	Charlie Wild	
2018	Tales from the Hood 2	Portifoy Simms	Direct-to-video
2018	Night School	Gerald Walker	
2018	You Might Be the Killer	Sheriff James (voice)	
2018	Love Jacked	Ed	
2018	Sharon 1.2.3.	Tyrone	
2019	Horror Noire: A History of Black Horror	Himself	Documentary
2019	The Wedding Year	Preston	
2019	In Search of Darkness	Himself	Documentary
2019	21 Bridges	Deputy Chief Spencer	
2020	Horizon Line	Wyman	
2020	In Search of Darkness: Part II	Himself	Documentary
2020	Most Guys Are Losers	Al	
2021	The Seventh Day	Father Louis	
2021	The Gateway	Terry	
2021	Black as Night	Babineaux	
2021	Pups Alone	The Wise Bartender	
2022	Catwoman: Hunted	Tobias Whale (voice)	Direct-to-video
2022	The Prank	Principal Henderson	
2022	Unplugging	T-Bone	
2022	Nope	Otis Haywood Sr.	
2022	DC League of Super-Pets	Dog-El (voice)	
2022	Remember Me: The Mahalia Jackson Story	Ink Williams	
2023	A Snowy Day in Oakland	Mr. Monroe	
2023	American Fiction	Willy the Wonker	Nominated – Outstanding Performance by a Cast in a Motion Picture
2023	Heist 88	Buddha Ray	
2024	Tim Travers & The Time Traveler's Paradox	The Simulator	
2024	Shelby Oaks	Morton Jacobson	
2024	Mufasa: The Lion King	Masego (voice)	
2025	Sneaks	O.G. (voice)	
2025	Portal to Hell	Mr. Bobshank	
2026	Mike & Nick & Nick & Alice	Sosa	
2026	Spider-Man: Brand New Day	Narrator of Spider Video (voice)	
TBA	Dreams of the Moon †	TBA	Post-production
TBA	My New Friend Jim †	TBA	Filming

== Television ==
Year	Title	Role	Notes
1983–85	Mister Rogers' Neighborhood	Himself, The Handyman	9 episodes
1988	The Equalizer	Cristo	Episode: "Sea of Fire"
1988	Ladykillers	Abe	Television film
1988	Christmas in Tattertown	Saxophone, additional characters	Voice, television film
1989	A Man Called Hawk	Jesse	Episode: "Vendetta"
1990	Murder in Black and White	Martin	Television film
1990	Against the Law	Otis Turnbull	Episode: "Requiem in B Flat"
1991	3×3 Eyes	Mama, additional characters	English dub
1993	The Young Indiana Jones Chronicles	King Oliver	Episode: "Mystery of the Blues"
1993	TriBeCa	The Reader	Episode: "Honor"
1993	The Last Outlaw	Lovecraft	Television film
1993	American Playhouse	Big Willie	Episode: "Hallelujah"
1993	There Are No Children Here	John Paul Rivers	Television film
1994–95	Aladdin	Minos, King Zahbar	Voice, 3 episodes
1994–97	Gargoyles	Officer Morgan, Goliath, Thailog	Voice, 78 episodes
1995	Fantastic Four	Black Panther	Voice, episode: "Prey of the Black Panther"
1996	New York Undercover	Reverend Harris	2 episodes
1996	Timon & Pumbaa	Mr. Pig	Voice, episode: "Animal Barn"
1997	Vanishing Point	Warren Taft	Television film
1997	Murder, She Wrote: South by Southwest	Algric Bartles	Television film
1997	Don King: Only in America	Jabir Herbert Muhammad	Television film
1997–99	Todd McFarlane's Spawn	Lieutenant Colonel Al Simmons / Spawn	Voice, 18 episodes
1998	Hercules	Apollo	Voice, 2 episodes
1998	The Tiger Woods Story	Earl Woods	Television film
1999	A.T.F.	F.B.I. Director Richard Long	Television film
2000	The Outer Limits	Captain Ira Merit	Episode: "Abaddon"
2000	The Race for the Poles	Narrator	Voice, documentary
2001	Law & Order	John Robertson	Episode: "Bronx Cheer"
2001	Semper Fi	Gunnery Sergeant Brinkloff	Television film
2001	Going to California	Paradise	Episode: "I Know Why the Caged Rhino Sings"
2001	Jazz	Narrator	Voice, 10 episodes
2001	The Legend of Tarzan	Tublat	Voice, 3 episodes
2001	House of Mouse	Card Soldier	Voice, episode: "The Stolen Cartoons"
2001–02	The Job	Lieutenant Williams	9 episodes
2002	Arliss	Cecil Pickett	Episode: "Standards and Practices"
2003	CSI: Crime Scene Investigation	Matt Phelps	Episode: "Random Acts of Violence"
2003	Spider-Man: The New Animated Series	Agent Mosely	Voice, 2 episodes
2003	Kingdom of David: The Saga of the Israelites	Narrator	Voice, documentary
2003	Justice League	Despero	Voice, episode: "Hearts and Minds"
2003	Inside Mecca	Narrator	Voice, documentary
2004	The Big House	Clarence Cleveland	5 episodes
2004	Teen Titans	Atlas	Voice, episode: "Only Human"
2004	Unforgivable Blackness: The Rise and Fall of Jack Johnson	Narrator	Voice, documentary
2004–05	City Confidential	Narrator	Voice
2005	Grey's Anatomy	Lloyd Mackie	2 episodes
2005	Everwood	Brian	Episode: "Pro Choice"
2005	The Proud Family Movie	BeBe Clone	Voice, television film
2005	The Crusades: Crescent and the Cross	Narrator	Voice, documentary
2006–07	ER	Pastor Watkins	5 episodes
2006–07	7th Heaven	Stanley Sunday	4 episodes
2007	The War	Narrator	Voice, documentary
2007	After Hours with Daniel Boulud	Self	Episode: "Ford's Filling Station"
2008	The Spectacular Spider-Man	Big Man	Voice, episode: "Survival of the Fittest"
2008	Canterbury's Law	Miles Grant	2 episodes
2008	World War II Behind Closed Doors	Narrator	Voice, documentary
2008	SIS	Joseph Armstrong	Television film
2008	Psych	Mr. Guster	Episode: "Christmas Joy"
2009	Numbers	Jeremiah Miller	Episode: "Hydra"
2010	Funny or Die Presents	Sleeping Celebrity	Episode: "Episode Six"
2010	Ken Burns' Baseball: The Tenth Inning	Narrator	Voice; 2 episodes
2011	The Cape	Max Malini	10 episodes
2011	Hawaii Five-0	Jimmy Cannon	Episode: "Ho'opa'i"
2011	Allen Gregory	Carl Trent D'Avis "Cole Train"	Voice, 5 episodes
2011	WWE The True Story of WrestleMania	Narrator	Voice, special
2012	Robot Chicken	Various characters	Voice, episode: "Hemlock Gin and Juice"
2012	WWE WrestleMania XXVIII	Narrator	Voice, special
2012	Community	Narrator	Voice, Episode: "Pillows and Blankets"
2012–17	Adventure Time	Flame King, Balthus	Voice, 8 episodes
2013	Belle's	William "Big Bill" Cooper	6 episodes
2013	Young Justice	Mongul	Voice, episode: "War"
2013	Touch	Dutch	Episode: "Ghosts"
2013	The Bible	Narrator	Voice, 10 episodes
2013	Once Upon a Time in Wonderland	Cheshire Cat	Voice, episode: "Down the Rabbit Hole"
2014	Things You Shouldn't Say Past Midnight	Dean	2 episodes
2014	Enlisted	Sergeant Major Donald Cody	13 episodes
2014	Scorpion	Warden	Episode: "Father's Day"
2015	Archer	Lemuel Kane	Voice, episode: "The Kanes"
2015	Big Time in Hollywood, FL	Agent Everett Malloy	6 episodes
2015	Community	Elroy Patashnik	12 episodes
2015	Mr. Robot	Qwerty	Voice, episode: "eps1.3_da3m0ns.mp4"
2015	Extant	Nicholas Calderon	Episode: "Zugzwang"
2015	Black Jesus	Reverend Otis	3 episodes
2015	Uncle Grandpa	Santa Claus	Voice, episode: "Secret Santa"
2015–present	Rick and Morty	The President / Andre Curtis, Reverse Giraffe	Voice, 9 episodes
2015–16	Teenage Mutant Ninja Turtles	Sal Commander	Voice, 4 episodes
2016	Person of Interest	Terence Beale	Episode: "Truth Be Told"
2016	Kulipari	Lord Marmoo	Voice, 13 episodes
2016	The 600: The History of NASCAR's Toughest Race	Narrator	Voice, documentary
2016–20	Greenleaf	Bishop James Greenleaf	60 episodes
2017	Regular Show	Streaming	Voice, episode: "A Regular Epic Final Battle"
2017	OK K.O.! Let's Be Heroes	Crinkly Wrinkly	Voice, episode: "Legends of Mr. Gar"
2017	Ben 10	Yawk	Voice, episode: "Mayhem in Mascot"
2017	BoJack Horseman	Lion Musician	Voice, episode: "Hooray! Todd Episode"
2017	Future Man	Dr. Kronish	5 episodes
2017	We Bare Bears	Barry's Dad	Voice, episode: "Icy Nights II"
2017	Speechless	Colonel Clements	Episode: "B-r-i-- British I-n-v-- Invasion"
2017	Superior Donuts	John	Episode: "Homeless for the Holidays"
2017–20	The Flash	Solovar	Voice, 3 episodes
2017–18	Stretch Armstrong and the Flex Fighters	Malcolm Kane	Voice, 20 episodes
2018–21	Final Space	Bolo	Voice, 10 episodes
2018	SpongeBob SquarePants	Gary's Collar	Voice, episode: "Chatterbox Gary"
2018	New Warriors	Ernest Vigman / MODOK	Voice, pilot
2018	Rapunzel's Tangled Adventure	Captain Quaid	Voice, 2 episodes (additional dialogue)
2018	Champaign ILL	Lafonso	10 episodes
2018–19	Star vs. the Forces of Evil	Glossaryck	Voice, 12 episodes
2019	Avengers Assemble	T'Chaka	Voice, episode: "Bashenga"
2019	Fresh Off the Boat	Clyde Roses	Episode: "Grandma's Boys"
2019	Craig of the Creek	Narrator	Voice, episode: "Craig and the Kid's Table"
2019–20	The Last Kids on Earth	Thrull	Voice, 6 episodes
2020, 2025	Family Guy	Various	Voice, 2 episodes
2020	NCIS: New Orleans	Gene Holloway	2 episodes
2020	MacGyver	Agent Burke	Episode: "Father + Son + Father + Matriarch"
2020	Black-ish	Loose Craig	Episode: "Earl, Interrupted"
2020	JJ Villard's Fairy Tales	Lionel	Voice, episode: "Rumpelstiltskin"
2020	Woke	Bible	Voice, episode: "Prayers for Kubby"
2020	The Good Lord Bird	Herbert	Episode: "Meet the Lord"
2020–22	Amphibia	King Andrias Leviathan	Voice, 15 episodes
2020–21	Summer Camp Island	Lithophone, Tummy	Voice, 2 episodes
2021	Close Enough	Campbell's Mug	Voice, episode: "Time Hooch/World's Greatest Teacher"
2021	DuckTales	Manny the Headless Man-Horse	Voice, episode: "The Last Adventure!"
2021	Creepshow	Mr. Murdoch	Episode: "Pesticide"
2021	Central Park	Ward Wittlinger	Voice, episode: "Of Course You Realize This Means Ward"
2021	Muhammad Ali	Narrator	Voice, documentary
2021	Love Life	Narrator	Voice, 10 episodes
2021–22	Stargirl	Mister Bones	Voice, 3 episodes
2022	The Wonderful World of Mickey Mouse	Narrator	Voice, episode: "The Wonderful Spring of Mickey Mouse"
2022	Entergalactic	Mr. Rager	Voice, television special
2022	From Scratch	Hershel Wheeler	8 episodes
2022	Leverage: Redemption	Billy Spencer	Episode: "The Fractured Job"
2022–23	American Dad!	Fire Chief	Voice, 2 episodes
2022–24	Firebuds	Manny Kablamee	Voice, 3 episodes
2023	The Proud Family: Louder and Prouder	Clone BeBe	Voice, episode: "Us Again"
2023	True Lies	Albert "Al" Gibson Sr.	Episode: "Independent Dependents"
2023	Justified: City Primeval	Judge Alvin Guy	Episode: "City Primeval"
2023	Transformers: EarthSpark	Grimlock	Voice, 5 episodes
2023	My Dad the Bounty Hunter	B'Caala	Voice, 3 episodes
2023	Pluto	Dr. Tenma	English dub, 5 episodes
2023–present	Chibiverse	King Andrias Leviathan, Goliath	Recurring role
2023–present	Krapopolis	Asskill	Voice, 9 episodes
2024	Masters of the Universe: Revolution	Hordak	Voice, 3 episodes
2024	Kite Man: Hell Yeah!	Darkseid	Voice, 4 episodes
2024	Hit-Monkey	Mephisto	Voice, 5 episodes
2024	Invincible Fight Girl	Scouter	Voice, 5 episodes
2024–25	Abbott Elementary	Frank	3 episodes
2024–present	Hazbin Hotel	Husk	Voice, 15 episodes
2025	High Potential	Captain Pacheco	Episode: "The Sauna at the End of the Stairs"
2025	Gremlins: Secrets of the Mogwai	Bass Reeves	Voice, 2 episodes
2025	Duster	Ezra Saxton	8 episodes
2025	Haunted Hotel	Mortoth	Voice, episode: "Welcome to the Undervale"
2025	Charlotte's Web	Old Sheep	Voice, 3 episodes
2025	Teen Titans Go!	Narrator	Voice, episode: "Unmasking - The Teen Titans Story"
2025	The American Revolution	Theodore Romeyn	Voice, episode: "The Times That Try Men's Souls (July 1776 - January 1777)"
2025	I Love LA	Leon Marcus	Episode: "I Love NY"
2025	King of the Hill	Brian Robertson	Voice, 4 episodes
2025–present	The Lowdown	Marty Brunner	8 episodes
2026	Strip Law	Steve Nichols	Voice, 10 episodes
2026	The Gray House	Henry H. Garnet	4 episodes
2026	Devil May Cry	Lucan	Voice, 1 episode
2026	Crime and Punishment in America	Narrator	Voice, documentary
2026–present	President Curtis	President Andre Curtis	Voice, Lead role

== Video games ==
Year	Title	Voice role	Notes
1997	Fallout	Decker	
1998	Disney's Hades Challenge	Apollo	
1999	Planescape: Torment	Vhailor	
2003	Lords of EverQuest	Lord Vekk	
2004	Halo 2	Arbiter Thel 'Vadamee / Thel 'Vadam	
2006	Saints Row	Julius Little	Also motion capture
2007	Transformers: The Game	Barricade	
2007	Halo 3	Arbiter Thel 'Vadam	
2007	Mass Effect	David Anderson	
2008	Saints Row 2	Julius Little	Also motion capture
2008	Dissidia Final Fantasy	Chaos	
2009	Call of Duty: Modern Warfare 2	Sergeant Foley	
2009	The Princess and the Frog	Dr. Facilier	
2009	Coraline	Narrator, The Cat	
2010	Mass Effect 2	David Anderson	
2010	Megamind: Ultimate Showdown	Psycho Dellic	
2010	Megamind: Mega Team Unite	Psycho Dellic	
2011	Dissidia 012 Final Fantasy	Chaos	
2012–2013	Mass Effect 3	David Anderson	
2013	Marvel Heroes	Nick Fury	
2013	Saints Row IV	Vice President Keith David / Julius Little	
2015	Halo 5: Guardians	Arbiter Thel 'Vadam	
2019	Darksiders: Genesis	Moloch	
2020	Mortal Kombat 11	Al Simmons / Spawn	
2022	Pocket Mortys	The President / Andre Curtis	
2024	Destiny 2: The Final Shape	Commander Zavala	Replaced Lance Reddick
2025	Ark: Survival Ascended	Lost King / Darius Anthom	Present in Lost Colony

== Theme parks ==
Year	Title	Role	Notes
2012	Sorcerers of the Magic Kingdom	Dr. Facilier	Voice

== Theatre ==
Year	Title	Role	Notes
1979	The Haggadah	Performer	Original Off-Broadway Production
1980	The Lady from Dubuque	Oscar	Broadway
1982	Alec Wilder - Clues To A Life	Performer	Original Off-Off-Broadway Production
1986	The Tale of Madame Zora	Performer	Original Off-Off-Broadway Production
1986	Romeo and Juliet	Capulet	Broadway Revivals (performed in repertory)
1986	As You Like It	Jaques	Broadway Revivals (performed in repertory)
1986	Macbeth	Macbeth (alternate)	Broadway Revivals (performed in repertory)
1991	Jelly's Last Jam	Chimney Man	World Premiere
1992	Jelly's Last Jam	Chimney Man	Original Broadway Production
1994	Hedda Gabler	Judge Brack	Broadway Revival
1996	Seven Guitars	Floyd Barton	Broadway
2006	Hot Feet	Victor	Original Broadway Production
2013	Joe Turner's Come and Gone	Seth Holly	Los Angeles Revival
2014	Paul Robeson	Paul Robeson	Los Angeles
2015	ToasT	Dolomite	Off-Broadway
2025	The Nightmare Before Christmas	Oogie Boogie	Los Angeles
