= Gramley =

Gramley is a surname. Notable people with the surname include:

- Joseph Gramley (born 1970), American composer
- Lyle Gramley (1927–2015), American economist
