= Ben Ford =

Ben or Benjamin Ford may refer to:

- Ben Ford (politician) (1925–2022), British Labour Party member of parliament for Bradford North 1964–1983
- Ben Ford (chef) (born 1966), American restaurateur, chef and son of actor Harrison Ford
- Ben Ford (baseball) (born 1975), American Major League Baseball right-handed pitcher
