= You're Gonna Miss Me =

You're Gonna Miss Me may refer to:

- "You're Gonna Miss Me" (song), by the 13th Floor Elevators
- You're Gonna Miss Me (film), documentary about Roky Erickson
- "You're Gonna Miss Me", song by Eddie Curtis, recorded by Connie Francis in 1959

== See also ==
- "Cups" (song), a 2012 song by Anna Kendrick for the movie Pitch Perfect, prominently featuring the line, "You're gonna miss me"
- "You're Gonna Miss Me When I'm Gone", a 1995 country song by Brooks & Dunn
- "You're Gonna Miss This", a 2008 country song by Ashley Gorley and Lee Thomas Miller, and recorded by Trace Adkins
- "You'll Miss Me When I'm Not Around", a 2020 song by Canadian musician Grimes
