= Kirschenbaum =

Kirschenbaum is a German surname of Lutheran or Ashkenazic origin meaning "cherry tree", written Kirschbaum in modern German (Kirschen means "cherries"; Baum means "tree").

An orthographic variation of the name is Kirshenbaum. Yiddish spelling variations include Karshenboym and Korshenboim. Notable people with the surname include:

- Alan Kirschenbaum, American television producer and writer
- Alan Kirschenbaum, primary contributor and the namesake of the Usenet ASCII-IPA transcription
- Binnie Kirshenbaum, American novelist and short story writer
- Faina Kirschenbaum, Israeli politician
- Marc Kirschenbaum, American origami artist
- Moti Kirschenbaum, Israeli media personality and documentarian
- Sheril Kirshenbaum, American science writer
- Susan Kirshenbaum, American television writer

== See also ==
- Kirschbaum
- Kirshbaum
- Duvdevani, Hebraization of "cherry tree" surnames
