= Tzedek =

Tzedek may refer to:

- Tzedek (charity), a UK-based Jewish charity targeting global poverty
- Tzedek Centers, an Israeli non-governmental organization that aims to promote democracy, equality, and social justice.
- Shir Tzedek (born 1989), Israeli footballer

== See also ==
- Tzedek ve-Shalom, historic synagogue in Paramaribo, Suriname
- Tzadik (disambiguation)
