= Yitzhak Orpaz =

Israeli writer (1921–2015)

- יצחק אורפז
- Born: October 15, 1921; Zinkiv, Soviet Ukraine
- Died: 14 August 2015 (aged 93)
- Children: 4

Yitzhak Orpaz (né Averbuch, Hebrew: יצחק אוורבוך אורפז; 15 October 1921 – 14 August 2015) was an Israeli writer.

== Biography ==
Yitzhak Averbuch was born in Zinkiv in Soviet Ukraine. He immigrated to Mandatory Palestine in 1938 at the age of 17.

In 1942, Averbuch found out that his parents and sister had all died in the Holocaust. Afterwards, he enlisted in the British Army and served in the Jewish Brigade during the Second World War. After returning to British Palestine, he shortly worked as a diamond polisher before returning to the battlefield, this time as an artillery officer in the Israel Defense Forces during the 1947–1949 Palestine war. After the war he served in the regular army.

He studied philosophy and Hebrew literature at Tel Aviv University.

In 1949, he published his first story in the military journal Ba-Mahaneh. During readings of the story on the radio, he was asked to Hebraize his name, and he changed his last name from "Averbuch" to "Orpaz".

His first book Wild Grass was published in 1959.

As part of his process of "returning to the roots", Orpaz re-adopted the original surname of Averbuch, previously abandoned by his family for the sake of "Israeliness".

== Awards ==
Orpaz has received the following awards:

- Asher Barash Prize (1962)
- Miriam Talpir Prize (1969)
- Fichman Prize (1975)
- Prime Minister's Prize (1976, 1999, 2004)
- Israel Efrat Award (1985)
- Bialik Prize (1986)
- Neuman Prize (1997)
- President's Prize for Lifetime Achievement (1999)
- In 2005, Orpaz was awarded the Israel Prize for literature.

== See also ==
- List of Israel Prize recipients
