= Woodrow Wilson and the Birth of the American Century =

- Directed by: Carl Byker; Mitch Wilson
- Narrated by: Linda Hunt
- Music by: David Vanacore; Vic Vanacore
- Country of origin: United States
- Original language: English

Production
- Producers: Carl Byker; Richard Kassebaum; Isaac Mizrahi; David Mrazek
- Cinematography: Mitch Wilson
- Editors: Victor Livingston; Isaac Mizrahi

Original release
- Network: PBS
- Release: 2002

Woodrow Wilson and the Birth of the American Century is a 2002 American documentary film, narrated by Linda Hunt, that was aired in the United States as a two-part limited television series starting on January 6, 2002. The documentary won an IDA Award for its directors Carl Byker and Mitch Wilson in the category of "Limited Series".
