= 1984 United States Senate election in Kansas =

- November 6, 1984
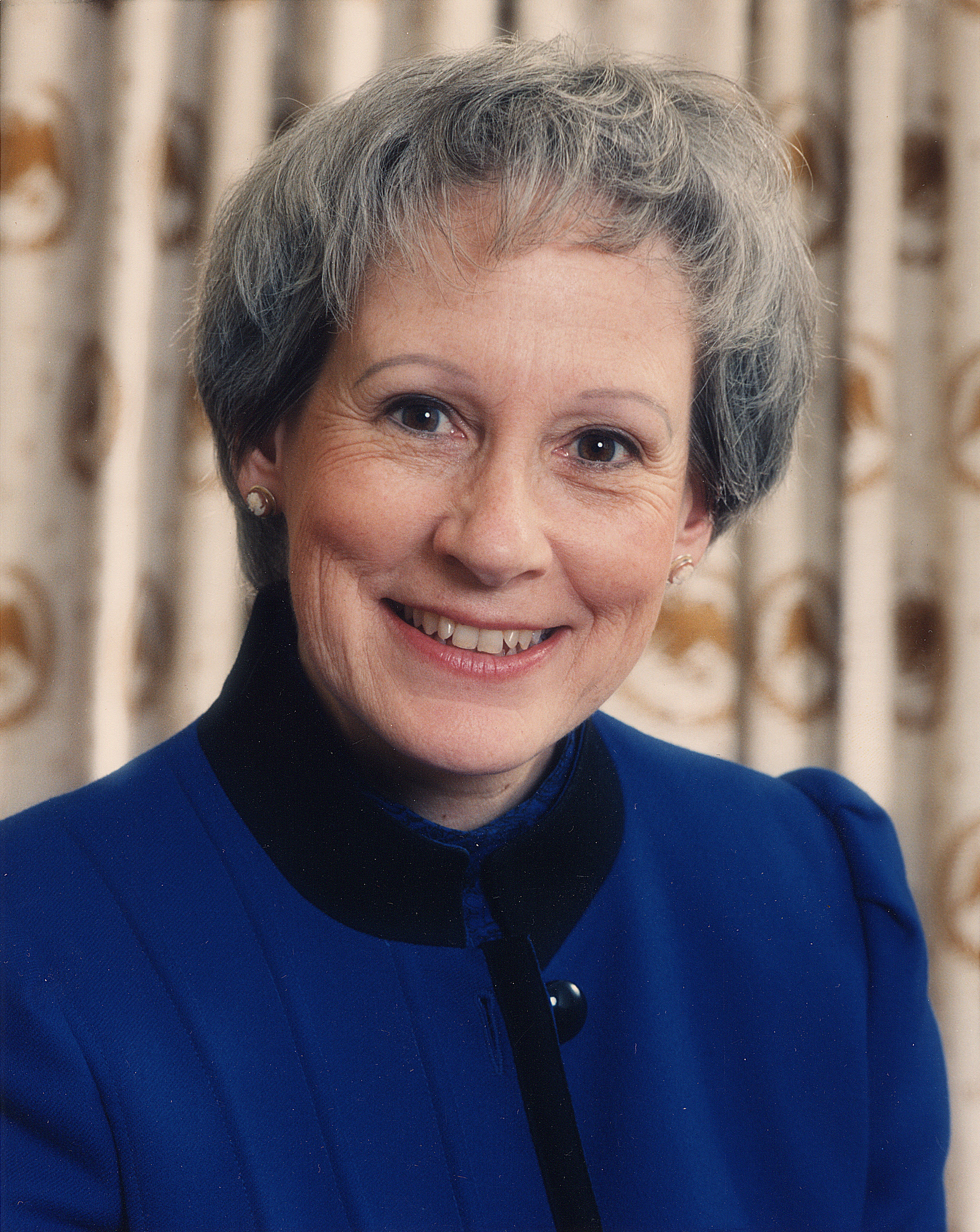

Nominee	Nancy Kassebaum	James R. Maher
Party	Republican	Democratic
Popular vote	757,402	211,664
Percentage	75.99%	21.24%
- County results Kassebaum: 50–60% 60–70% 70–80% 80–90%
U.S. senator before election
Nancy Kassebaum
Republican
Elected U.S. Senator
Nancy Kassebaum
Republican

The 1984 United States Senate election in Kansas was held on November 6, 1984.

Incumbent Senator Nancy Kassebaum was re-elected to a second term in office.

== Republican primary ==
=== Candidates ===
- Nancy Kassebaum, incumbent Senator

=== Results ===
Senator Kassebaum was unopposed for renomination by the Republican Party.

== Democratic primary ==
=== Candidates ===
- James R. Maher, financial consultant and Conservative Party nominee for Senate in 1978

=== Results ===
Maher was unopposed for the Democratic nomination.

== Independents and third parties ==
=== American ===
- Marian Ruck Jackson, nominee for Lt. Governor in 1978 and 1982

=== Conservative ===
- Lucille Bieger, resident of Russell

=== Libertarian ===
- Douglas N. Merritt, resident of Atchison

=== Prohibition ===
- Freda H. Steele, resident of Alta Vista

== General election ==
=== Results ===
General election results
Party	Candidate	Votes	%	±%
Republican	Nancy Kassebaum (incumbent)	757,402	75.99%	▲22.13
Democratic	James R. Maher	211,664	21.24%	▼21.17
Conservative	Marian R. Jackson	9,380	0.94%	▼2.06
American	Marian R. Jackson	6,918	0.69%	▲0.69
Libertarian	Douglas N. Merritt	6,755	0.68%	▲0.68
Prohibition	Freda H. Steele	4,610	0.46%	▼0.26
Total votes		996,729	100.00%	
Republican hold		Swing		

== See also ==
- 1984 United States Senate elections
