= Kirshbaum =

Kirshbaum is a Jewish surname derived from the German word literally meaning "cherry tree". Notable people with the surname include:

- Howard Kirshbaum (born 1938), associate justice of the Colorado Supreme Court
- Larry Kirshbaum (born 1944), American publishing executive
- Ralph Kirshbaum (born 1946), American cellist

== See also ==
- Kirschbaum
- Kirschenbaum
