= Zinkiv, Khmelnytskyi Oblast =

Zinkiv Зіньків
- Village
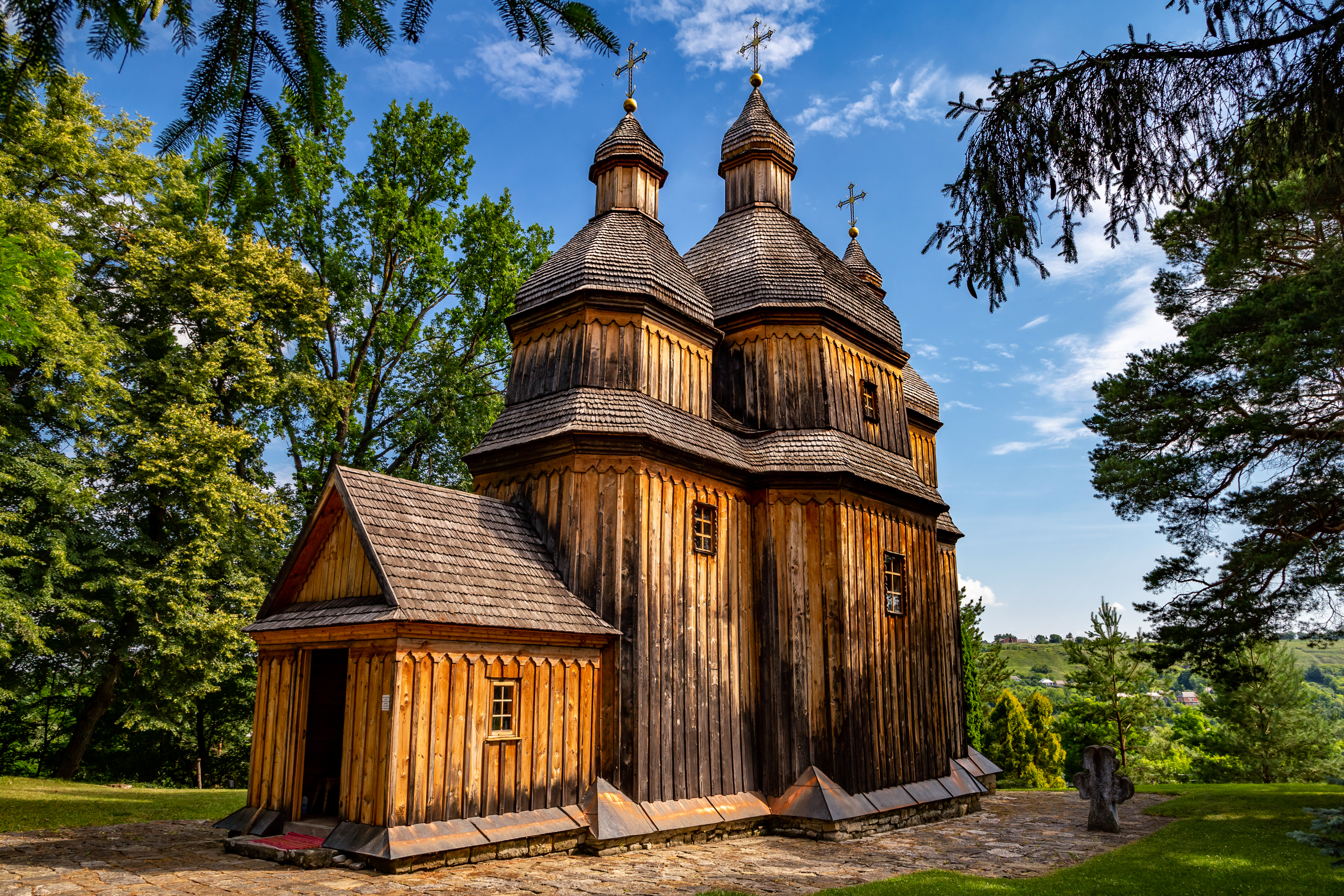
- St. Michael's Church in Zinkiv

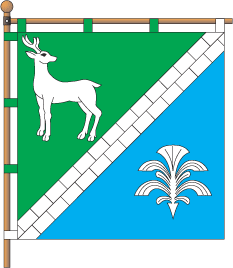
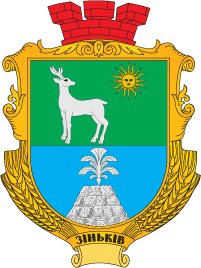
- Flag Coat of arms
- Interactive map of Zinkiv
- Location within Ukraine
- Coordinates: 49°5′37″N 27°4′31″E
- County: Ukraine
- Oblast: Khmelnytskyi
- Raion: Khmelnytskyi
- Hromada: Zinkiv rural hromada
- Village council: Zinkiv village council (Pysarenka str., 46)

Area
  - Land: 6,867 km^{2} (2,651 sq mi)

Population
  - Total: 1,686
  - Density: 245.52/km^{2} (635.9/sq mi)
- Postal code: 32514
- Area code: +380 3846
- KOATUUI: 6820683501

Zinkiv (Ukrainian: Зіньків [ˈz⁽ʲ⁾nʲkiu̯]; Russian: Зиньков, romanized: Zin'kov; Yiddish: זינקיוו, romanized: Zinkiv) is a village in western Ukraine, located upon the Ushytsia river in Khmelnytskyi Raion of Khmelnytskyi Oblast. It serves as the centre of Zinkiv rural hromada. As of 2001, it had a population of 1,822.

== History ==
=== Early history ===
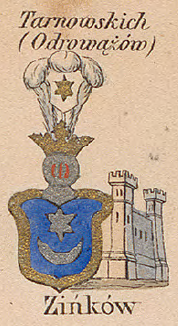
Zinkiv Castle on Zygmund Gerstmann's 1863 map

Between the 15th and 17th centuries Zinkiv served as a fortified town. A castle was established there in the 16th century, and the stone Trinity Church, established in 1521, became the first three-nave religious building in Ukraine. A Catholic church existed in the city from 1450, and a synagogue in a transitional Gothic-Renaissance style was erected.

Jews had resettled in Zinkiv by the early 18th century, but were murdered by the haidamaks, anti-Polish Ukrainian insurgents, in 1734. The arrival of Polish rabbi Avraham Yehoshua Heshel and his son Yitzchak Meir in the second half of the 18th century reinvigorated the Jewish presence, and Zinkiv became a leading center of Hasidic Judaism in the Podolia area.

In 1897, the city's population was 7,017, 53 percent of whom were Jews.

=== 20th century ===
After the establishment of the Soviet Union, a kolkhoz collective farm was established in the city. Many of the city's Jews, who comprised 35 percent of the population, worked as artisans and craftsmen in state-owned cooperatives.

At the outbreak of World War II in 1939, the city was home to 2,248 Jews.

On June 22, 1941, Nazi Germany and many of its Axis allies invaded the Soviet Union as part of Operation Barbarossa. By July 10, the Nazis had occupied Zinkiv. In August, the Nazis established a Judenrat, an administrative body that would oversee affairs of the city's Jews and coordinate dealings with the Nazi authorities.

One of the Judenrat's responsibilities was to coordinate the Jews' sequestration into a ghetto, which in Zinkiv consisted only of a single house. The Nazi authorities imposed a series of discriminatory measures against the Jewish population. Jews were also forced to pay ransoms and systematically dispossessed of their belongings and gold. Those over the age of 10 were required to wear a yellow badge on their chest and backs and were forbidden to walk on sidewalks. To humiliate the Jews, the Germans and their Ukrainian collaborators cut the beards and payos of religious Jews, including the city's rabbi, in a practice reportedly called "taking the Jews to the barber."

In 1942, the Nazis ramped up their killing operations against Zinkiv's Jews. On May 9, 1942, approximately 600 Jews, many infirm, elderly, and women with children, were shot to death and buried in a mass grave approximately 1.5 kilometers outside the city. On August 4, an additional 1,882 Jews were shot to death at the same site. Able-bodied men were sent to forced labor camps at Proskurov and Leznyevo, leaving 150 Jewish workers in the ghetto.

The Soviet Red Army liberated Zinkov in March 1944, ending the Nazi occupation of Zinkiv. Only approximately 30 Jews in Zinkiv survived the war.

Under the Soviet rule, Zinkiv belonged to the Vinkivtsi Raion. Following its abolition in 2020 the village was incorporated into Khmelnytskyi Raion.

== Demographics ==
=== Languages ===
According to the 2001 Ukrainian Census, the following languages were spoken in Zinkiv:

Language	Persons	Percentage
Ukrainian	1,797	98.63%
Russian	19	1.04%
Romanian	2	0.11%
Yiddish	1	0.05%
Other/NA	3	0.17%
Total	1,822	100%

== Gallery ==
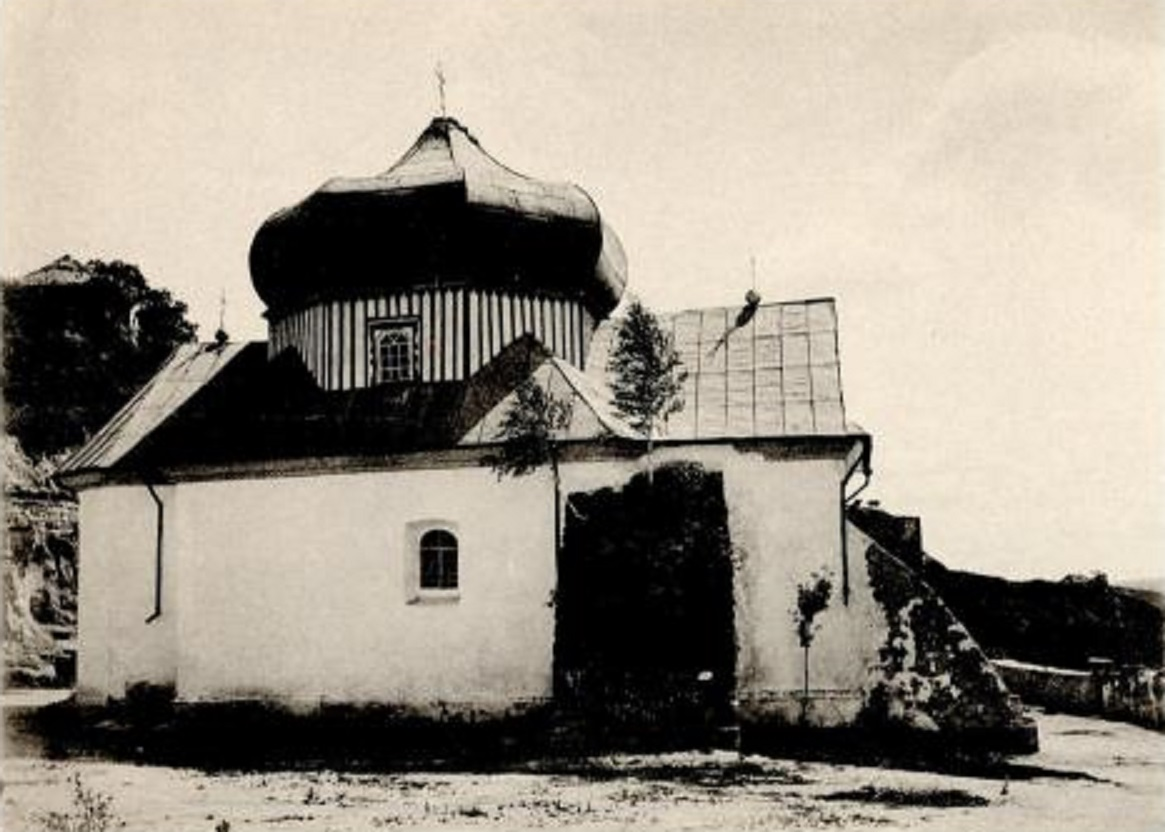
Trinity Church in Zinkiv, established 1450, photographed circa 1880- 1905

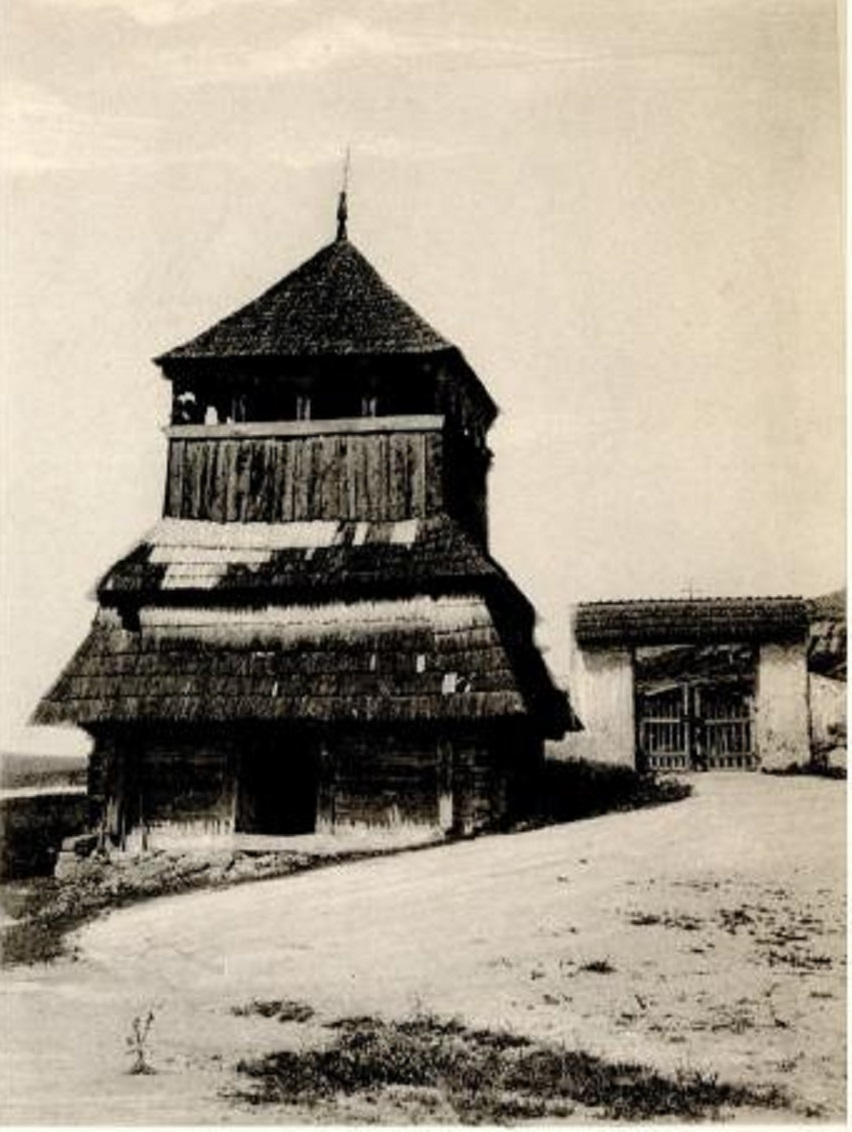
Belfry of the Trinity Church in Zinkiv, established in 1726, photographed circa 1880-1905

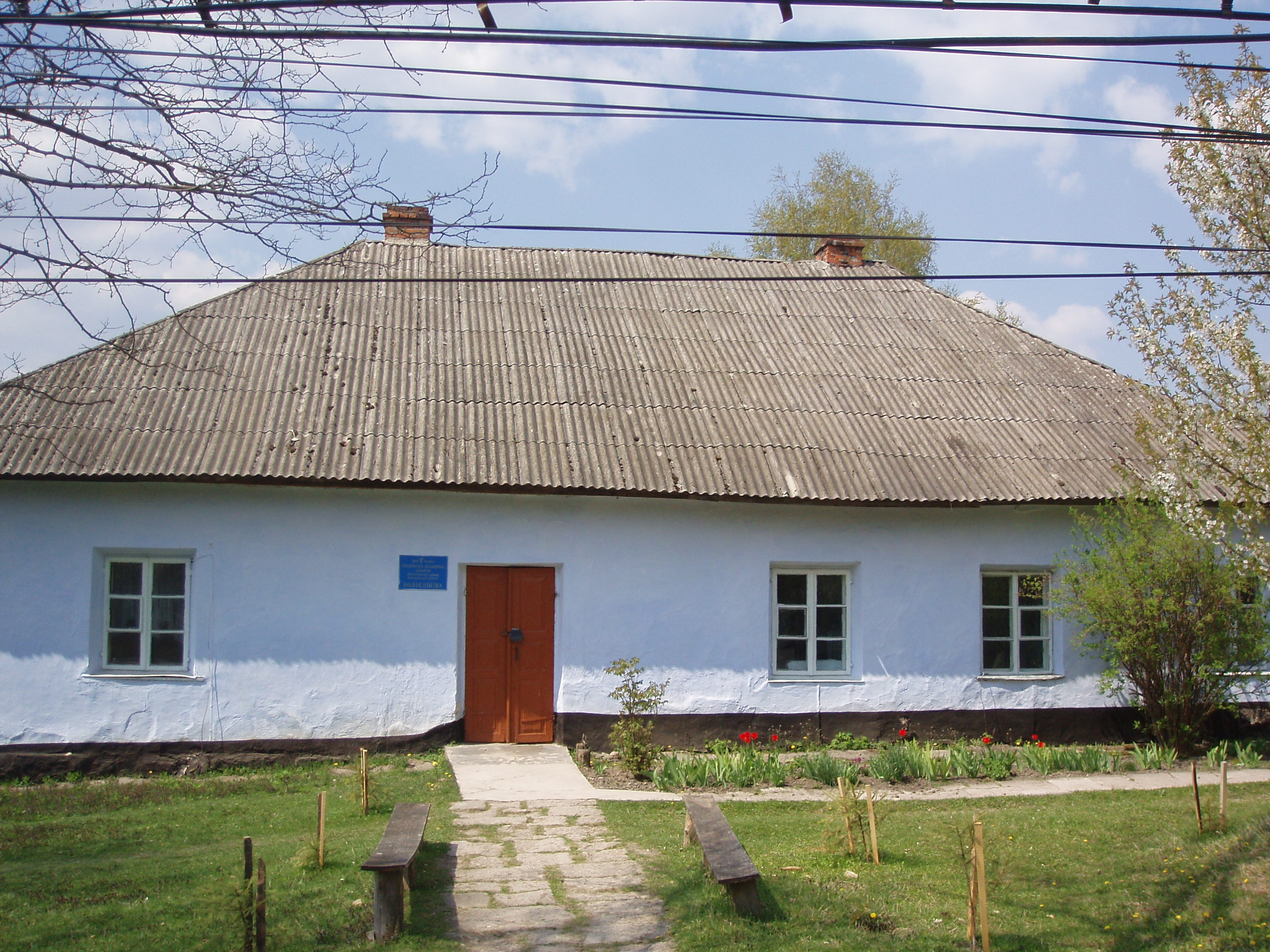
Zinkiv District Hospital

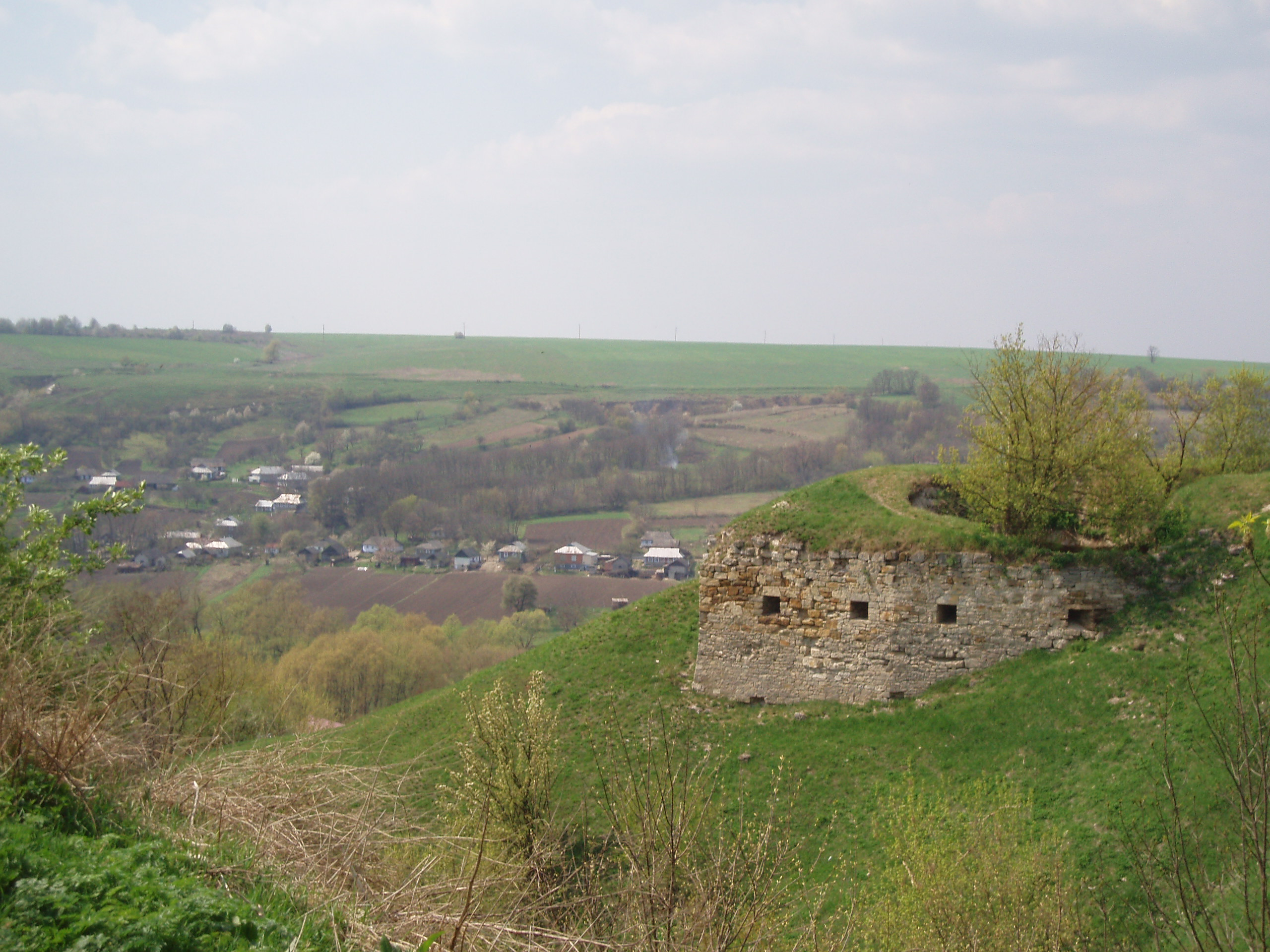
Remains of a fortress in Zinkiv

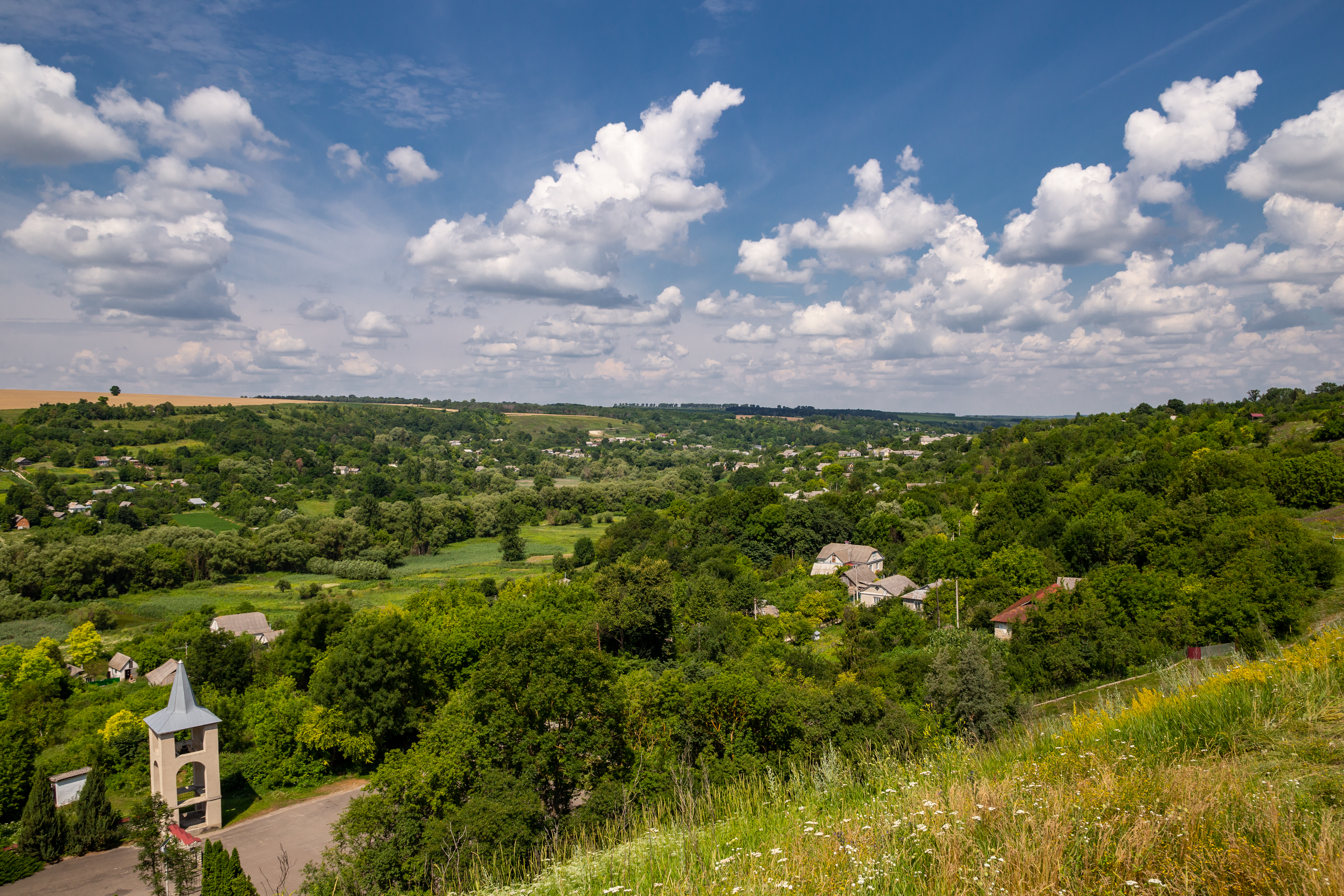
Landscape of Zinkiv

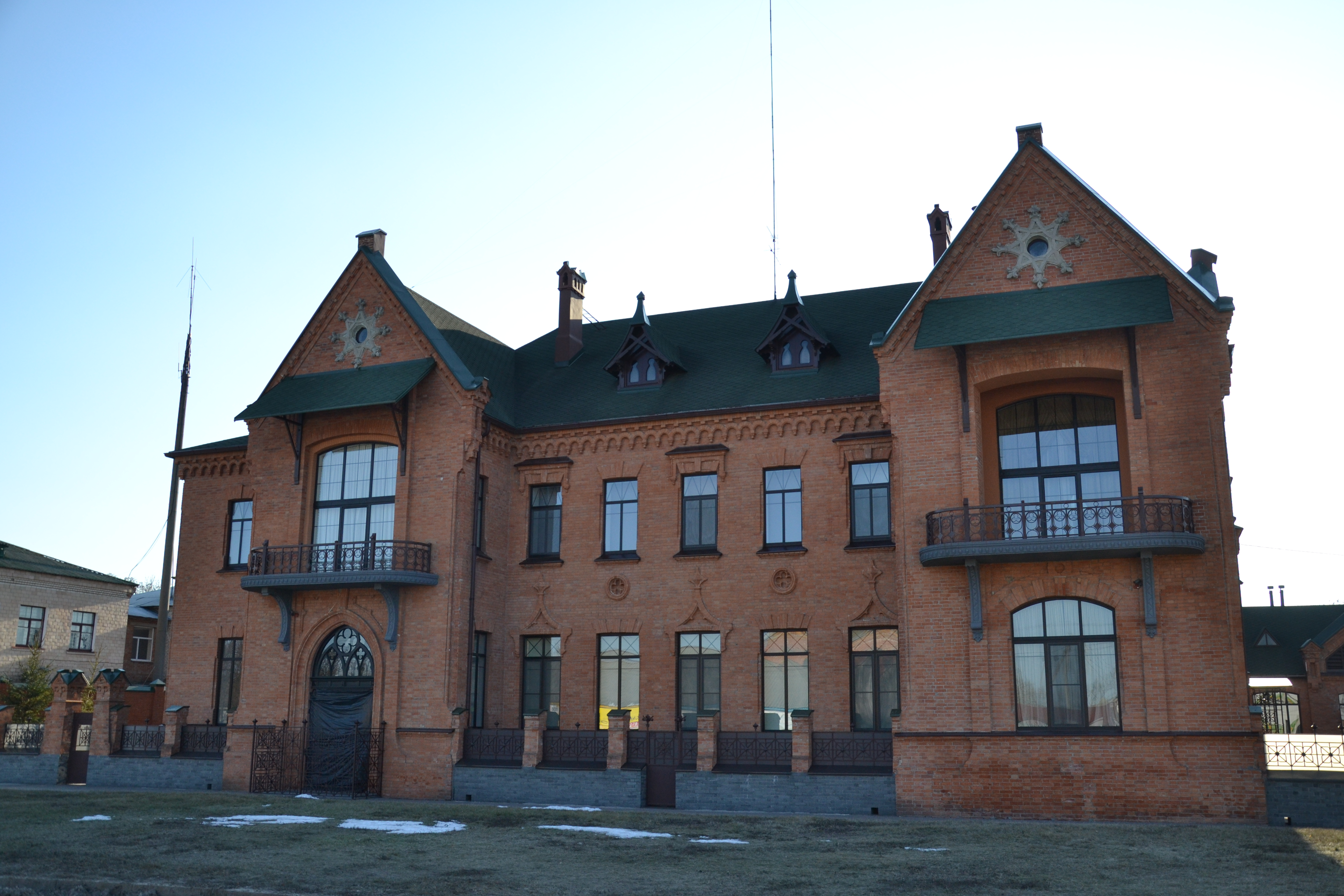
A city mansion in Zinkiv, 2016

== Births ==
- Yitzhak Orpaz, Israeli writer
- Alla Mazur, Ukrainian journalist

== See also ==
- List of villages and towns depopulated of Jews during the Holocaust
