= Duvdevani =

Duvdevani (Hebrew: דובדבני, also דֻּבדבני) is a Hebrew-language surname. It is a Hebraization of the Yiddish surname Kirshenbaum: the latter means literally "cherry tree", while "cherry" is דובדבן in Hebrew. Notable people with the surname include:

- Amit Duvdevani (born 1974), Israeli musician and music producer
- Avraham Duvdevani (born 1945), Israeli public figure, Chairman of the World Zionist Organization (2010–2020)
- Lior Duvdevani (born 1979), Israeli comedian
- Yehiel Duvdevani (1896–1988), Zionist activist and politician
- Yehuda Duvdevani, brigadier general of the Israeli Defence Force
