= Carl Byker =

American TV producer, writer, and director

Carl Byker is the founder of Red Hill Productions and an American television producer, writer, and director. He has written, directed and produced multiple hours for the PBS series Frontline and American Experience. He has also made 12 limited series and science specials for PBS. Among his accolades are the 1997 Prime-Time Emmy Award (shared with Blaine Baggett and Jay Winter) for The Great War and the Shaping of the 20th Century in the category of Outstanding Informational Series, the Peabody Award, two Alfred I. duPont–Columbia University Award silver batons, two International Documentary Association awards for best limited series, and the Investigative Reporters and Editors award for best multi-platform project of the year for collaboration with NPR, ProPublica and Frontline. Carl’s films have also been nominated six times by the Writers Guild of America for best non-fiction television script of the year and have won the award twice.

== Filmography ==
Filmography for Carl Byker
Title	Program	Year	Notes	Ref.
Power in the Pacific		1988		
"Inside Japan Inc."	The Pacific Century	1992	Co-written with Alex Gibney and Andrea Malin	
"The Fight for Democracy"	The Pacific Century	1992		
The Human Quest		1996	Co-producer; Co-writer	
The Great War and the Shaping of the 20th Century		1996		
The Tree of Life		1999		
"The Duel"	American Experience	2000	Co-directed with Mitch Wilson	
Woodrow Wilson and the Birth of the American Century	American Experience	2002	Co-directed with Mitch Wilson	
Kingdom of David: The Saga of the Israelites		2003	Co-directed with Mitch Wilson	
The New Heroes		2004		
"The Meth Epidemic"	Frontline	2005		
Uncommon Heroes		2006		
Andrew Jackson: Good, Evil and The Presidency		2008	Co-directed with Mitch Wilson	
When Worlds Collide		2010		
"Post Mortem: Death Investigation in America"	Frontline	2011		
"Money and March Madness"	Frontline	2011		
"Dollars and Dentists"	Frontline	2012		
"Life and Death in Assisted Living"	Frontline	2013		
Hacking Your Mind		2020	Director; Producer; Writer	

== Personal life ==
Carl grew up near Grand Rapids, MI. He went to film school at Montana State University in Bozeman, where he won the American Cinema Editors award as best student editor in the nation. He now lives in Los Angeles with his wife Sue Horton, an editor at the Los Angeles Times. His son, Sam Byker, is the CEO of Atticus.
