= Wayne Angell =

American economist, politician and bank executive (1930–2025)

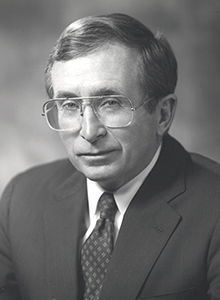

Member of the Federal Reserve Board of Governors
- In office February 7, 1986 – February 9, 1994
- President: Ronald Reagan; George H. W. Bush; Bill Clinton
- Preceded by: Lyle Gramley
- Succeeded by: Janet Yellen

Personal details
- Born: June 28, 1930 Liberal, Kansas, U.S.
- Died: April 19, 2025 (aged 94) Laguna Beach, California, U.S.
- Party: Republican
- Education: Ottawa University (BA); University of Kansas, Lawrence (MA, PhD)

Wayne D. Angell (June 28, 1930 – April 19, 2025) was an American economist, politician and academic who served as a member of the Federal Reserve Board of Governors from 1986 to 1994.

== Life and career ==
Angell was born in Liberal, Kansas on June 28, 1930. He graduated from Ottawa University, from the University of Kansas with an M.A. in 1953, and a Ph.D. in 1954. He taught at Ottawa University from 1959 to 1985. He was elected to the Kansas State House of Representatives, in 1960. He ran for the U.S. House of Representatives in 1966 and the U.S. Senate in 1978, losing in the Republican primaries to Larry Winn and Nancy Landon Kassebaum, respectively.

Angell served as a Governor of the Federal Reserve Board from 1986 to 1994. He left to become a Chief Economist and Senior Managing Director for Bear Sterns & Co., Inc., where he served until 2002. He opened a consultancy, Angell Economics.

Angell was a frequent economics commentator on CNBC's "Kudlow & Company", "Fast Money", and appeared on "Charlie Rose". A chair in economics has been named for him at Ottawa University.

Angell and his wife, Betty, lived in Laguna Beach, California, and had four children and nine grandchildren. He died at his home in Laguna Beach, on April 19, 2025, at the age of 94.

Government offices
Preceded by Lyle Gramley	Member of the Federal Reserve Board of Governors; 1986–1994	Succeeded by Janet Yellen
