= Victor Livingston =

American film and television editor

- Born: Los Angeles, California
- Occupation(s): Film and television editor

Victor Livingston is an American film and television editor known for his work on documentaries. He majored in English at Cornell University in the 1960s before moving to San Francisco to pursue film, initially inspired by Joseph Strick's Ulysses. After dropping out of San Francisco State's film program, Livingston was hired as an apprentice editor on The Wanderers (1979). Livingston later became known for Crumb (1994), for which he was nominated an Eddie Award.

== Partial filmography ==
=== Film ===
- Crumb (1994)
- Bukowski: Born into This (2003)
- You're Gonna Miss Me (2005)
- The Dungeon Masters (2008)

=== Television ===
- David Blaine: Street Magic (1996)
- Woodrow Wilson and the Birth of the American Century (2002)
- Real World (1994–2010), various episodes
- Starting Over (2005), several episodes
- Greensburg (2008), several episodes
