= Bogorad =

Bogorad is a Russian-language surname of Jewish origin, a Hebrew abbreviation for ben haRav Dovid (Hebrew: בן הרב דוד, lit. 'son of rabbi David'). Notable people with the surname include:

- F. A. Bogorad, Russian neuropathologist, the namesake of Bogorad's syndrome
- Grigoriy Bogorad (1914–1996), Soviet military officer and emigrant to Israel
- Lawrence Bogorad (1921–2003), American botanist
- Samuel Bogorad (1907–1996), Jewish Hero of the Soviet Union
- Viktor Bogorad (born 1949), Russian cartoonist
- Yakov Bogorad (1879–1941), Russian composer and Holocaust victim

== See also ==
- Bogoraz, a surname of similar etymology
