= Gilboa =

Gilboa may refer to:

- Mount Gilboa, a biblical site in Israel, where King Saul's sons were killed by the Philistines, and Saul killed himself (1 Samuel 31:4)
- Gilboa Regional Council
- Two towns in the United States are named for the mountain:
  - Gilboa, New York
  - Gilboa, Ohio
- Gilboa Fossil Forest, New York state, USA
- The fictional kingdom of Gilboa, in the American TV series Kings
- Gilboa (surname)
- Gilboa Prison in Israel
