= Richard Kassebaum =

American documentary filmmaker

- Born: November 15, 1960; Wichita, Kansas, U.S.
- Died: August 27, 2008 (aged 47); Knoxville, Tennessee, U.S.
- Education: Kansas State University; University of Southern California
- Occupation: Filmmaker
- Parent(s): Nancy Landon Kassebaum; Philip Kassebaum
- Relatives: William Kassebaum (brother); Alf Landon (grandfather)

Richard Kassebaum (November 15, 1960 – August 27, 2008) was an American documentary filmmaker. He is best remembered for producing television documentaries, including the 2002 award-winning Limited Series Woodrow Wilson and the Birth of the American Century. Born in Wichita, Kansas, Kassebaum was the son of Republican Senator Nancy Landon Kassebaum. Kassebaum graduated from Maize High School in Maize, Kansas. He received his bachelor's degree in radio and television from Kansas State University and did graduate work in the film school at the University of Southern California. He died from a brain tumor on August 27, 2008, in Knoxville, Tennessee, at the age of 47.

== Filmography as a producer ==
- The American Experience - two episodes (2000, 2002)
- Woodrow Wilson and the Birth of the American Century (2002)
- Kingdom of David: The Saga of the Israelites (2003)
