= Gilboa (surname) =

Gilboa is a surname. Notable people with the surname include:

- Amir Gilboa (1917–1984), Ukrainian-born Israeli poet
- Jacob Gilboa (1920–2007), Israeli classical composer
- Itzhak Gilboa (born 1963), Israeli economist
- Tal Gilboa (born 1978), Israeli animal liberation and vegan activist
