= Ben Ford (chef) =

American chef and restaurateur

- Born: Benjamin Ford; September 22, 1966 (age 59); United States
- Spouse: Emily Ford (2009-2024)
- Children: 2, Waylon and Ethan
- Parents: Harrison Ford (father); Mary Marquardt (mother)
- Relatives: Willard Ford (brother); Malcolm Ford (brother); Georgia Ford (sister); Liam Flockhart Ford (brother)
- Culinary career
- Current restaurants: Ford's Filling Station; Doorstep Market
- Television shows: After Hours with Daniel; Iron Chef America

Ben Ford is an American celebrity chef, restaurateur and the oldest son of actor Harrison Ford.

Ben Ford's mother, illustrator Mary Marquardt, was Harrison Ford's first wife.

In the 1980s, Ford attended culinary school and later opened a number of restaurants such as the gastropub Ford's Filling Station and Doorstep Market.

Ford's Filling Station closed its original Culver City location in 2014 after 8 years of business and reopened in Los Angeles inside the J.W. Marriott Hotel in the fall of 2014. It was later reported that the Los Angeles location had closed.

One Ford's Filling Station remains at the Los Angeles International Airport, Terminal 5.

In 2014, he published the cookbook, Taming the Feast.

Ford and his wife Emily Ford were wed in 2009 and were married for 14 years. The two divorced in 2024.
