= Tzedek (charity) =

British surgery

- Type: INGO
- Purpose: Judaism, charity, Education poverty reduction
- Headquarters: Golders Green, London, United Kingdom
- Region served: Worldwide
- Key people: Kira Blumer (CEO), Steve Miller (Founder)
- Affiliations: Make Poverty History

Tzedek is a UK-based registered charity organisation which aims to provide a Jewish response to the problem of extreme global poverty. Registered as a charity in 1993, Tzedek has a number of overseas development programmes, working closely with local NGOs to alleviate extreme poverty in Northern Ghana and Northeast & Southeast India. As well as supporting local NGOs within these regions, Tzedek aims to develop the leadership skills of young Jewish leaders within the community to provide a long-term, sustainable solution to global poverty.

== Vision and mission ==
Tzedek's framework is based on the concept of tzedek, a Hebrew linguistic root word for justice. The word does not merely indicate legal rights but also compassion and humanity. That is why, in the Jewish tradition, the word for charity is tzedakah. The Jewish values reflected in Tzedek's work include Ahavtah et HaGer (you shall love the stranger), which teaches a view of a global world without racial or religious boundaries; and, Naaseh v'nishma (we will do and we will understand), which holds that awareness and knowledge lead to actions with deeper commitment. It is because of this that Tzedek believes that the UK Jewish community can be at the forefront of the challenge to reduce extreme poverty abroad.

Tzedek seeks to provide a point of contact between the Jewish and non-Jewish worlds, by engaging the UK Jewish community with sustainable development projects overseas to non-Jewish beneficiaries. The charity's work particularly focuses on impacting the livelihoods of women and young people, as research suggests that this provides the longest lasting impact within communities.

Tzedek believes that poverty is a man-made problem and can only be solved by fighting for social justice. Tzedek's initiatives, therefore, are twofold:

1. Developing strong, sustainable partnerships with local NGOs to empower communities and tackle poverty. These projects are predominantly focused in Northern Ghana and Northeast & Southeast India and focus on increasing access to education and improving vocational skills of the local population.
2. To raise awareness within the UK Jewish community of global poverty to increase a sense of global social responsibility. Through education and developing the leadership skills of young Jewish leaders, Tzedek can provide a platform for social responsibility ambassadors within the community to organise and create meaningful change.

== Present work ==
=== Ghana ===
Tzedek's primary work in Ghana involves reducing extreme poverty in the Tolon District of Northern Ghana. Their work within this region aims to create sustainable changes in livelihood, by improving the standards of education and youth empowerment within the communities. There is a strong emphasis on working in coordination with local individuals and organisations within the region in order to understand and to the most significant local issues

Examples of initiatives Tzedek have supported in Ghana include:

- Providing access to finance and seed funds in rural locations through saving schemes.
- Delivering vocational training to improve livelihoods.
- Setting up a cooperative for disabled women.
- Providing mentoring to school students to guide them through careers, advise on study practice and how to access scholarship funds.
- Driving targeted improvements in educational quality in primary schools.
- Building youth empowerment initiatives to improve livelihood opportunities and also to develop young community leaders

=== India ===
Tzedek's work in India focuses on four main regions: Bihar, West Bengal, Andhra Pradesh and Tamil Nadu. The majority of the charity's work within India consists of funding sustainable poverty relief by partnering with and supporting local NGOs. By empowering these local organisations with self-sustaining livelihood projects, this has a long-term impact on the communities.

The projects that Tzedek fund in India fall into the following categories:

- Virtual savings and loans associations
- Vocational skills training
- Agriculture
- Livestock
- Microcredit
- Livelihood

=== Programmes ===
- The Ben Azzai Programme - an immersive learning experience, run in association with the Office of the Chief Rabbi, for university students on a trip abroad to one of Tzedek's focus regions in the developing world. The participants meet with local organisations and communities to greater understand the concept of social responsibility and Jewish obligation. Participants of the programme have gone on to set up Social Responsibility Weeks (SRW) at their Universities, with cooperation from Tzedek.
- Go Develop - an opportunity for individuals to volunteer in communities in Ghana and India, taking part in responsible development work. There is a particular focus on education, microfinance, women, youth empowerment and health.
- The Overseas Project Team (OPT) - the OPT operates Tzedek's Partnership Project Grants scheme, supporting creative grassroots projects that seek to improve the livelihood of poor and marginalised communities in Ghana and India. In 2018, Tzedek funded 20 partnership projects, lifting 3,600 individuals out of extreme poverty by tripling their average incomes. The OPT meets 4-6 times a year in London to discuss current applications and present new projects. Typical projects include vocational training, microcredit, livelihood start-ups, livestock, agriculture and more.
- Schools Twinning Programme - an initiative to connect primary schools in the UK and Ghana with the purpose of communicating and connecting with children of the same age in a different country, breaking down stereotypes and improving points of cultural exchange. Tzedek provides schools in both countries with a year-long curriculum, which can be applied to many subject areas and themes, sharing work, letter and photos with the twinned school.
- Schlep! - an initiative to encourage children in the UK to walk to school one morning, to raise funds in order to improve the quality of education children receive in Ghana and India.

== History ==
Tzedek's beginnings trace back to the spring of 1990, when a group of activists held a series of open seminars on global issues entitled 'Tzedek'. As a result of these seminars, in the autumn of 1990, Tzedek was launched as an organisation with a commitment to adhering to Jewish values and engaging with sustainable development work. In the early stages of Tzedek, projects were supported in South India, Zimbabwe, Sudan and Swaziland (now known as Eswatini) and a series of public seminars were held to improve awareness of these issues within the UK.

Being officially recognised as a charity in 1993 and continuing to expand, by 1995, Tzedek organised their inaugural volunteering expedition, where five volunteers travelled to Zimbabwe to co-ordinate and work alongside the local community. In the following years, the scope of Tzedek work's expanded to West Bengal, Kenya, Ghana, Bangladesh, Sri Lanka, Uganda and Nigeria.

In 2007, Tzedek won a significant three-year grant from the Department of International Development (DFID) for their work in education, that was later matched by the Pears Foundation.

In 2017, Tzedek made the decision to solely focus their overseas work in Northern Ghana and Northeast & Southeast India, in order to provide more sophisticated and detailed sustainable development projects for local communities.

Tzedek's work has been widely recognised around the world. The charity's founder, Steve Miller, was nominated for the Charity Times Outstanding Individual Achievement Award in 2010 for his work in setting up Tzedek and he was also quoted at a multifaith conference as part of the Jubilee Debt Campaign. The Chair of Tzedek, Jonathan Middleburgh, was also awarded for outstanding leadership at the Jewish Volunteering Network's Heartbeat of the Community Awards in 2018. The Jewish Chronicle have often recognised and applauded the work of Tzedek.

Tzedek also hold regular fundraising events, such as an annual comedy evening at the Arts Depot showcasing the best of UK Jewish comedy. Tzedek is also a member of the Make Poverty History coalition.
