= Kirschbaum =

Kirschbaum is the German surname literally meaning "cherry tree". It may refer to:

- Bill Kirschbaum (1902–1953), U.S. Olympic swimmer
- Carl Ludwig Kirschbaum (1812–1880), German entomologist, professor of biology, and museum director
- Charlotte von Kirschbaum (1899–1975), German theologian
- Eliezer Simon Kirschbaum (1797–1860), Austrian physician and writer
- Thorsten Kirschbaum (born 1987), German football player
- Walter Kirschbaum (fl. mid-20th century), West German slalom canoer

== See also ==
- Kirschenbaum
- Kirshbaum
