= Marc Kirschenbaum =

American origami artist and designer

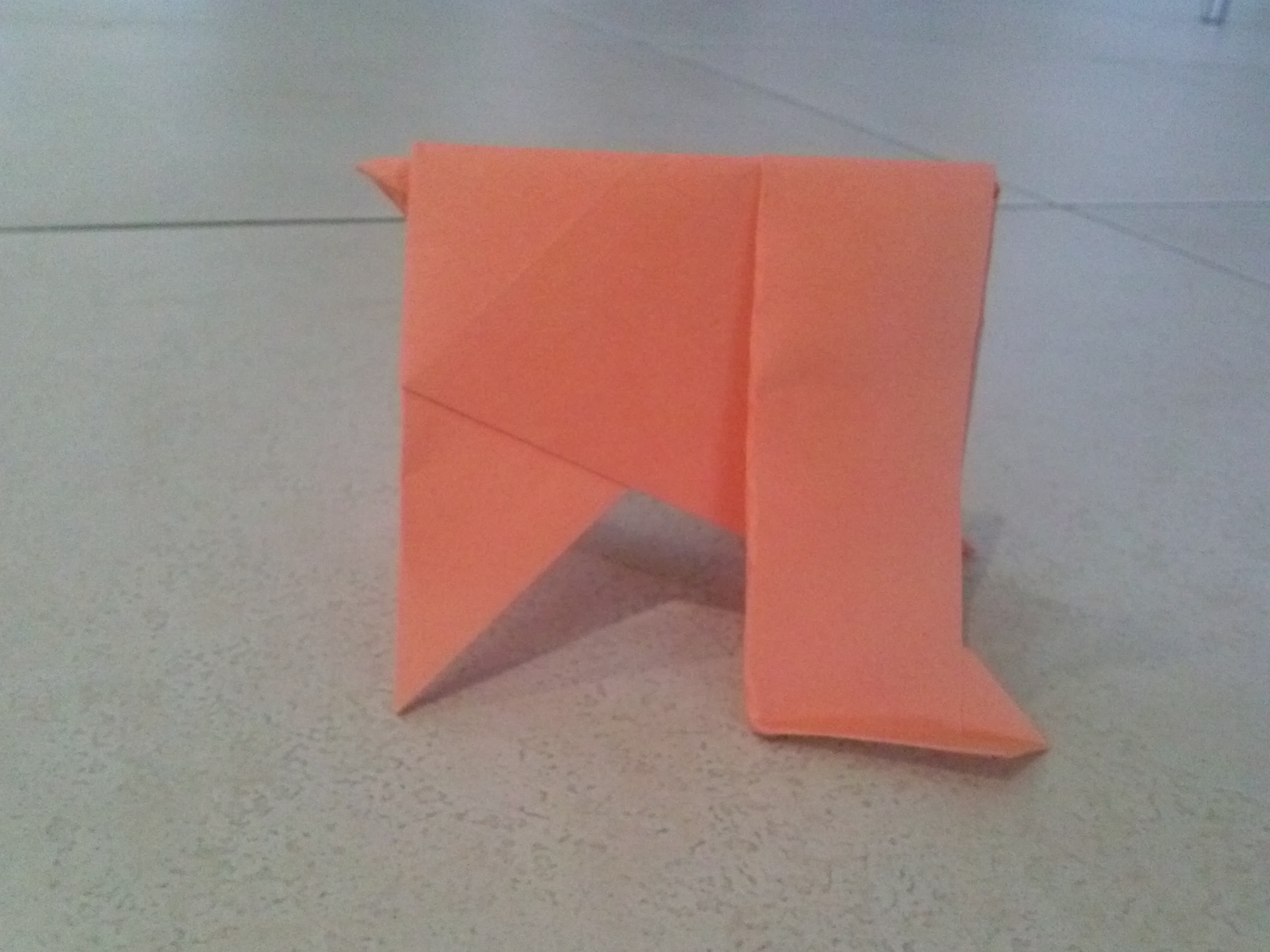
"Anally receptive", an example of erotic origami based on Marc Kirschenbaum's work.

Marc Kirschenbaum (born 1969) is an American origami artist, designer, and board member of OrigamiUSA. He is known for creation of complex origami models, including various instrumentalists, insects, and erotic origami works, called "pornigami". He has three books on how to do some of the origami pieces that he has made. The books are titled Paper in Harmony, Origami Bugs, Erotic Origami, and Pure and Simple Origami.

Erotic Origami contains instructions on how to create 12 different pieces.

== Biography ==
Marc Kirschenbaum was born in New York City in 1969. He began folding paper when he was 3 and started designing his own origami models during childhood. Kirschenbaum lives in New York City and works as an IT industry recruiter.

== Publications ==
- Paper in Harmony (2000)
- Origami Bugs (2007)
- Erotic Origami (2008)
