= Yichus =

Jewish concept of family lineage

Yichus (יִחוּס yḥws), a Hebrew-based Yiddish word meaning "lineage". In some past and present Jewish communities, good yichus—meaning descent from a family of high reputation—is necessary for a person to be considered as a potential marriage partner. Colloquially, the term refers to the chain of origin for a statement, creative work or object.

== Etymology ==
Yichus first appeared in the Hebrew Bible in the Book of Ezra. It appears in Ezra 2:62 and Nehemiah 7:5), where the Hebrew root (yud-chet-sin) means "relation to" or "related to." In the later rabbinic Hebrew, the last letter of the root changed from sin (ש) to samekh (ס), though the pronunciation and meaning remained unchanged. The latter spelling (yud-hey-samech) appears frequently in rabbinic literature.

Although the word yichus originated in Hebrew, the term is generally accepted as a Yiddish word that has flowed into modern English. The anglicized word has been transliterated as yichus, yikhes, yiches, and yikhus.

== History ==
As far back as the Talmudic era, being son-in-law to someone widely respected was valued. Subsequently, even the yichus of being son-in-law to the son-in-law and similar lineage links were valued. From the 14th century onwards, yichus was an important concern for Eastern European Jews. Good yichus could refer to Torah scholarship or wealth, while bad yichus resulted from the suspicion of illegitimate descent. However, many rabbis disapproved of the concept of yichus, instead insisting on judging individuals based on their personal merits. "In Lithuania some Jewish families hid their Yikhus (lineage)". There was a tension between yichus on one hand, and "meritocratic leadership based on scholarship" on the other. Judgments of yichus became one of the mechanisms which determined social hierarchies. From the 19th century, the significance of yichus declined as more marriages were based on romantic love, and reformers criticized yichus for leading to inbreeding within small circles of "acceptable" families. However, nowadays yichus is still an important qualification for marriage in charedi communities.

The family trees, or pedigree charts, of Jewish families, listing genealogy and family history records, have been identified with several names, among which are yichus book, yichus brief, and yichus record. To help a child trace lineage, some families would write a "yichus book". The focus of a yichus brief (letter of relationship) is not as extensive as a yichus book whereas a yichus book or yichus record/"sefer yuchsin"/registry is community-oriented. Some families also kept a separate "Register of Circumcisions".

== Types ==
Being the mechutan (מְחוּתָּן, father of one's child's spouse) of a notable person is sometimes considered important enough to include in a wedding invitation and in giving other credentials. Although primarily used for same generation relatives, it can be used beyond that generation. Being a ben achar ben (literally son-after-son, i.e. patrilineal) descendant is sometimes considered more notable than other forms of descent.

For various reasons, surnames/family names were changed, and sometimes reverted. Thus, Jewish family names have not always been a reliable indicator of ancestry. For example: certain family names, such as Cohen, are not as strongly indicative of being a Kohen as Katz.
