= Ford's Filling Station =

Restaurant information
- Established: 2006
- Owner: Ben Ford
- Head chef: Ben Ford
- Location: Los Angeles, Los Angeles County, California, United States
- Other locations: Culver City; Los Angeles International Airport

Ford's Filling Station' was a gastropub originally opened in 2006 in Culver City, California.

In a 2008 LAist interview, Ford's Filling Station owner and head chef Ben Ford, oldest son of actor Harrison Ford, spoke of what drew him to the gastropub's Culver City location, saying Culver City "had the studio, the cool hotel, this great city hall, they had developed the streets and it looked nice. I knew a movie theater was going in, I knew Kirk Douglas Theatre was going in, and so in that way, I wasn’t worried about the neighborhood."

In 2012, Ford's Filling Station won the Cochon 555 culinary competition.

In 2014, Ford announced that every third Wednesday of the month, the bars and restaurants of downtown Culver City held a "neighborhood-wide Happy Hour."

In 2014, Ford's Filling Station closed its original Culver City location.

The restaurant reopened at the J.W. Marriott Hotel in Los Angeles in fall of 2014.

The Los Angeles location eventually closed leaving a single Ford's Filling Station location at the Los Angeles International Airport.
