= Lyle Gramley =

American economist and government official (1927–2015)

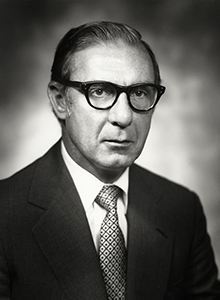

Member of the Federal Reserve Board of Governors
- In office May 28, 1980 – September 1, 1985
- President: Jimmy Carter; Ronald Reagan
- Preceded by: Philip Coldwell
- Succeeded by: Wayne Angell

Personal details
- Born: Lyle Elden Gramley; January 27, 1927 Aurora, Illinois, U.S.
- Died: March 22, 2015 (aged 88) Potomac, Maryland, U.S.
- Political party: Democratic
- Education: Beloit College (BA); Indiana University Bloomington (MA, PhD)

Lyle Elden Gramley (January 14, 1927 – March 22, 2015) was an American economist who served as a member of the Federal Reserve Board of Governors from 1980 to 1985. He previously served as a member of the Council of Economic Advisers from 1977 to 1980.

== Early life, military service and education ==
Gramley was born in Aurora, Illinois. He was in the United States Navy from 1944 to 1947 and became an electronics technician in the submarine force. He served on the USS Requin from 1946 to 1947. After serving in the Navy, he attended Aurora University and graduated from Beloit College in 1951.

== Career ==
He was a member of the Council of Economic Advisors during Carter administration until nominated to sit on the Fed Board as governor. After leaving the Fed, Gramley was a financial consultant for several corporations. He then earned his Ph.D. from Indiana University Bloomington.

Government offices
Preceded by Philip Coldwell	Member of the Federal Reserve Board of Governors; 1980–1985	Succeeded by Wayne Angell
