= You're Gonna Miss Me (film) =

- Film poster
- Directed by: Keven McAlester
- Produced by: Keven McAlester; Adrienne Gruben
- Starring: Roky Erickson; Patti Smith; Evelyn Erickson; Gibby Haynes; Billy Gibbons
- Cinematography: Lee Daniel
- Edited by: Victor Livingston
- Music by: Roky Erickson
- Production company: Sobriquet Productions
- Distributed by: Palm Pictures (US)
- Release date: March 15, 2005; (SXSW Film Festival)
- Running time: 94 minutes
- Country: United States
- Language: English

You're Gonna Miss Me is a 2005 American documentary film by Keven McAlester. It focuses on Roky Erickson, the former frontman for the rock band The 13th Floor Elevators. The band is cited as pioneers of the psychedelic rock genre.

== Content ==
The film covers Erickson's rise to fame, his excessive use of LSD, struggles with schizophrenia, and his 1969 marijuana arrest that led to stays at Austin State Hospital and Rusk State Hospital for the Criminally Insane. Erickson was irrevocably changed after the onset of his illness and he went long stretches with little interest in making or performing music. The film opens with Erickson, who had been living as a total recluse for over a decade. What follows is a closer look at how he came to live in poverty and isolation, struggles to receive effective treatments, and how he manages to return to music and life.

== Title ==
The film takes its name from the debut single by The 13th Floor Elevators.

== Honours ==
The documentary was nominated for a 2007 Independent Spirit Award for Best Documentary.

== Production ==
It took McAlester 6 years to make the film.

== Reception ==
A review in the New York Times noted, ’Also noteworthy is the film's superb cinematography, by Lee Daniel, a frequent Richard Linklater collaborator. His striking compositions and purposeful camera moves mirror Sumner Erickson's quest to create order from chaos.’

The Chicago Sun-Times found that ’The film, which premiered at SXSW in March, not only documents Erickson's legacy, it tells the broader human story of his battle with mental illness and its roots in his troubled upbringing, using a vivid but non-intrusive style as powerful as Terry Zwigoff's in the award-winning documentary, "Crumb."’

On review aggregator website Rotten Tomatoes, the film holds an approval rating of 85% based on 20 reviews, with an average rating of 6.9/10.
