= John Philip Kassebaum =

American attorney and art collector

- Born: October 24, 1932; Kansas City, Missouri, US
- Died: February 28, 2016 (aged 83); Charleston, South Carolina, US
- Education: University of Michigan
- Occupations: Attorney and art collector
- Spouses: Nancy Landon (m. 1956; div. 1979) Llewellyn Hood (m. 1979)
- Children: 4, including William and Richard

John Philip Kassebaum (October 24, 1932 – February 28, 2016) was an American attorney and art collector and former husband of U.S. Senator Nancy Kassebaum.

Kassebaum was born in Kansas City, Missouri. He received a Juris Doctor from the University of Michigan Law School. He met Nancy Landon while attending the University of Michigan. They married in 1956 and settled in Maize, Kansas, where they raised four children. They separated in 1975 and divorced in March 1979. Kassebaum then married Llewellyn Hood in August 1979, with whom he remained for the last 40 years of his life.

Beginning in the late 1950s, Kassebaum began collecting Medieval and Renaissance ceramics, including "lead- and tin-glazed pieces from Persia, Spain, Italy, France, Germany, the Netherlands and England".

Kassebaum later moved to Mount Pleasant, South Carolina, and became involved in historical preservation projects in Charleston, South Carolina, and Wichita, Kansas. He maintained law offices in Wichita and New York City and was "a frequent lecturer on ceramics and authored various articles on the subject".

His son William Kassebaum is a former member of the Kansas House of Representatives. Another son, filmmaker Richard Kassebaum, died of a brain tumor on August 27, 2008, at the age of 47. His daughter Dr. Linda Johnson died of supranuclear palsy in 2020 at the age of 61.

Kassebaum died in Charleston, South Carolina, on February 28, 2016, at the age of 83.
