= Kingdom of David: The Saga of the Israelites =

- Directed by: Carl Byker; Mitch Wilson
- Written by: Isaac Mizrahi; Carl Byker; Mitch Wilson
- Produced by: Jack Combs; Richard Kassebaum
- Narrated by: F. Murray Abraham; René Auberjonois; Keith David; Jeremy Irons; Derek Jacobi
- Music by: Erik Friedlander
- Distributed by: PBS Home Video
- Release date: 2003
- Country: United States
- Language: English

Kingdom of David: The Saga of the Israelites is a 2003 historical documentary that was produced for PBS. The documentary features original music by Erik Friedlander, and is narrated by an all-star voice-cast which includes F. Murray Abraham, René Auberjonois, Keith David, Jeremy Irons, and Derek Jacobi.

Written by Isaac Mizrahi, along with Carl Byker and Mitch Wilson who also directed the film, the film was produced by Oregon Public Broadcasting and Devillier Donegan Enterprises, and is distributed by PBS Home Video.

== Episodes ==
1. By the Rivers of Babylon - The Jews deported to Babylon look back to the stories of Abraham, Moses and David to see what went wrong to cause their fall from God's favor.
2. The Book and The Sword - The Jews are sent back to their homeland by the Persians. Years later the Jews must fight to maintain their religious freedom from the Greeks.
3. The End of Days - The Jews are subjects of Rome. Religious fanaticism reaches a boiling point which leads to the great Jewish rebellion.
4. The Gifts of the Jews - The rebellion is crushed. The Temple is in ruins. The Jews are expelled from Judea. How will they rebuild their religious heritage?
