= Tzadik (disambiguation) =

Tzadik may mean one of the following:

- Tzadik, the Hebrew word for "righteous one", and a title given to a Hasidic spiritual leader
- Tzadikim Nistarim are saintly people who are hidden from view
- The Yiddish name for Tsade, the eighteenth letter of the Hebrew alphabet
- Tzadik Records, a New York-based not-for-profit record label founded by John Zorn that specializes in many music styles, including jazz, avant-garde, classical, and radical Jewish culture (and more)
- Zadik–Barak–Levin syndrome, named after Zadik, Barak, and Levin

== See also ==
- Tzedek
- Zadok
