= Bogoraz =

Bogoraz is a surname of Russian-Jewish origin which is an acronym of "Ben ha-rav Zalman" (בן הרב זאַלמאַן) (son of rabbi Zalman), with /h/ becoming /g/ in Russian spelling and, subsequently, pronunciation. It may refer to:

- Vladimir Bogoraz (1865–1936), Russian anthropologist
- Larisa Bogoraz (1929–2004), Soviet dissident
- Nikolai Alekseevich Bogoraz (1874–1952), Russian and Soviet surgeon, urologist, professor, honored worker of science of the RSFSR,

== See also ==
- Bogorad, a surname of similar etymology
