= William Kassebaum =

American politician

Member of the Kansas House of Representatives from the 68th district
- In office January 13, 2003 – January 10, 2005
- Preceded by: Shari Weber
- Succeeded by: Shari Weber

Personal details
- Born: February 11, 1962 (age 64)
- Party: Republican
- Parent(s): Nancy Kassebaum; John Philip Kassebaum
- Relatives: Alf Landon (grandfather); Richard Kassebaum (brother)

William "Bill" Kassebaum (born February 11, 1962) is an American Republican politician who served as a member of the Kansas House of Representatives from 2003 to 2005.

== Career ==
In 2002, Kassebaum ran to serve in the sixty-eighth district of the Kansas House of Representatives, centered in Burdick, Kansas, in Morris County, Kansas. In the Republican primary on August 30, 2002, he challenged incumbent representative Shari Weber, and narrowly won, carrying 51.88 percent of the 3,851 ballots cast.

== Family ==
His mother was Nancy Landon Kassebaum, former United States Senator. His maternal grandfather was Alf Landon, Governor of Kansas. His brother was Richard Kassebaum, a documentary filmmaker.
