= Nancy Kassebaum =

American politician (1932–2026)

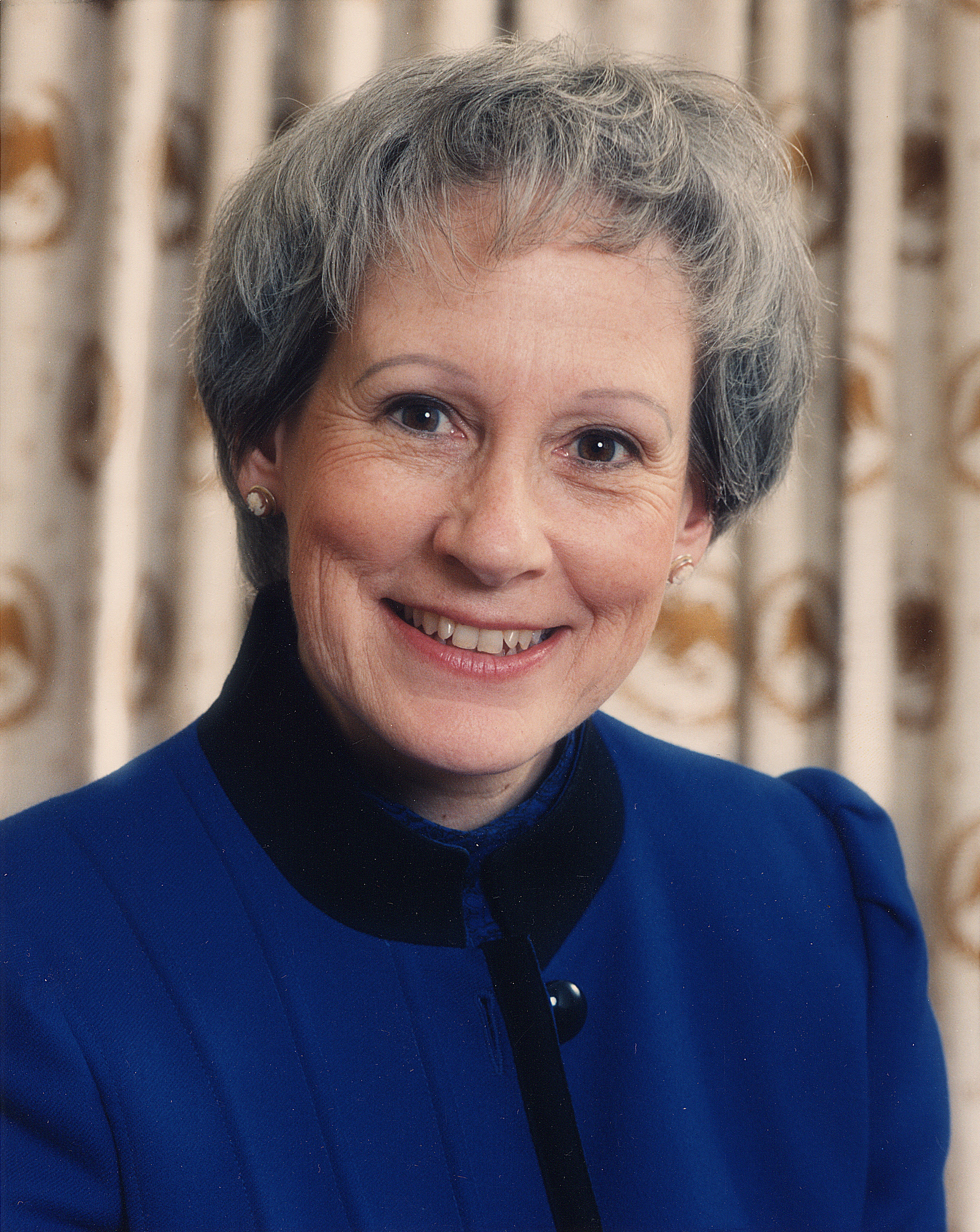
- Senate portrait

United States Senator from Kansas
- In office December 23, 1978 – January 3, 1997
- Preceded by: James B. Pearson
- Succeeded by: Pat Roberts
Senate positions
Chair of the Senate Labor Committee
In office January 3, 1995 – January 3, 1997
Preceded by	Ted Kennedy
Succeeded by	Jim Jeffords
Ranking Member of the Senate Labor Committee
In office January 3, 1993 – January 3, 1995
Preceded by	Orrin Hatch
Succeeded by	Ted Kennedy

Personal details
- Born: Nancy Josephine Landon; July 29, 1932 Topeka, Kansas, U.S.
- Died: August 21, 2026 (aged 94) Manhattan, Kansas, U.S.
- Party: Republican
- Spouses: John Philip Kassebaum (m. 1955; div. 1979) Howard Baker (m. 1996; died 2014)
- Children: 4, including William and Richard
- Parent: Alf Landon (father)
- Education: University of Kansas (BA); University of Michigan (MA)
- Nancy Kassebaum's voice Kassebaum on a proposed balanced budget amendment Recorded February 27, 1995

Nancy Josephine Kassebaum Baker (née Landon; July 29, 1932 – August 21, 2026) was an American politician who served as a Republican member of the United States Senate from Kansas from 1978 to 1997. She was the daughter of Alf Landon, who was governor of Kansas from 1933 to 1937 and the Republican nominee in the 1936 presidential election, and the wife of former U.S. Senate majority leader and diplomat Howard Baker.

With her election to the Senate in 1978, Kassebaum entered the national spotlight as the only woman in the U.S. Senate at the time, and as the first woman to represent Kansas in that chamber. She was also the first woman ever elected to a full term in the Senate without succeeding her spouse.

In her three terms in the Senate, Kassebaum demonstrated a political independence that made her a key figure in building bipartisan coalitions in foreign affairs and domestic policy. As chair of the Senate Subcommittee on African Affairs, she played a limited role in legislation to sanction apartheid South Africa. The 1986 Comprehensive Anti-Apartheid Act, enacted over Ronald Reagan's presidential veto, was drafted by senators Richard Lugar, William Roth, Mitch McConnell, and Bob Dole, although later in life Kassebaum claimed credit for it. As chair of the Senate Committee on Labor and Human Resources, she led the fight for major health care reforms that, for the first time, assured health insurance coverage for people changing jobs with pre-existing medical conditions.

== Early life and education ==
Nancy Josephine Landon was born in Topeka, Kansas, on July 29, 1932, the daughter of Kansas first lady Theo (née Cobb) and Governor Alf Landon. She attended Topeka High School, and graduated in 1950. She graduated from the University of Kansas in Lawrence in 1954, where she was a member of Kappa Alpha Theta, and where she met her first husband, John Philip Kassebaum. In 1956, she received a master's degree in diplomatic history from the University of Michigan.

She worked as vice president of Kassebaum Communications, a family-owned company that operated several radio stations. Kassebaum also served on the Maize School Board. In 1975, she and Philip were legally separated; their divorce became final in March 1979. Kassebaum worked in Washington, D.C. as a caseworker for Senator James B. Pearson of Kansas in 1975, but returned to Kansas the following year.

== Career ==
=== Elections ===
In late 1977, Senator Pearson announced he would not seek re-election to a third full term. The unexpected announcement of a rare open seat immediately drew a flood of candidates into the 1978 Republican primary, including two highly respected state senators, three successful businessmen, three others, and Nancy Kassebaum.

At the time that she entered the race, Kassebaum was legally separated from her husband, Philip, but not yet divorced. She chose to use the name Nancy Landon Kassebaum, to capitalize on her father's political reputation in the state. She defeated eight other Republicans in the 1978 primary elections to replace Pearson, and then defeated former Democratic representative William R. Roy (who narrowly lost a previous election bid to Kansas's junior senator, Bob Dole, in 1974) in the general election. For the rest of her political career, she was primarily known as Nancy Kassebaum. She was the first woman ever elected to a full term in the Senate without succeeding her spouse. She was re-elected to her Senate seat in 1984 and 1990, but did not seek re-election in 1996.

=== Tenure ===
==== Key issues ====
From the start of her Senate tenure, Kassebaum defied stereotypes, voting moderate to liberal on most social issues, but conservative on federal spending and government mandates. She helped lead an unsuccessful bi-partisan effort to curb soaring U.S. federal deficits in the early years of the presidency of Ronald Reagan. But she developed a reputation as a centrist broker, with significant impact on key issues in both foreign policy and domestic affairs. Kassebaum was known for her health care legislation, known as the Kennedy–Kassebaum Health Insurance Portability and Accountability Act, which was co-sponsored by U.S. senator Ted Kennedy from Massachusetts, a Democrat. She was also active in foreign policy. She expressed strong support of anti-apartheid measures against South Africa in the 1980s.

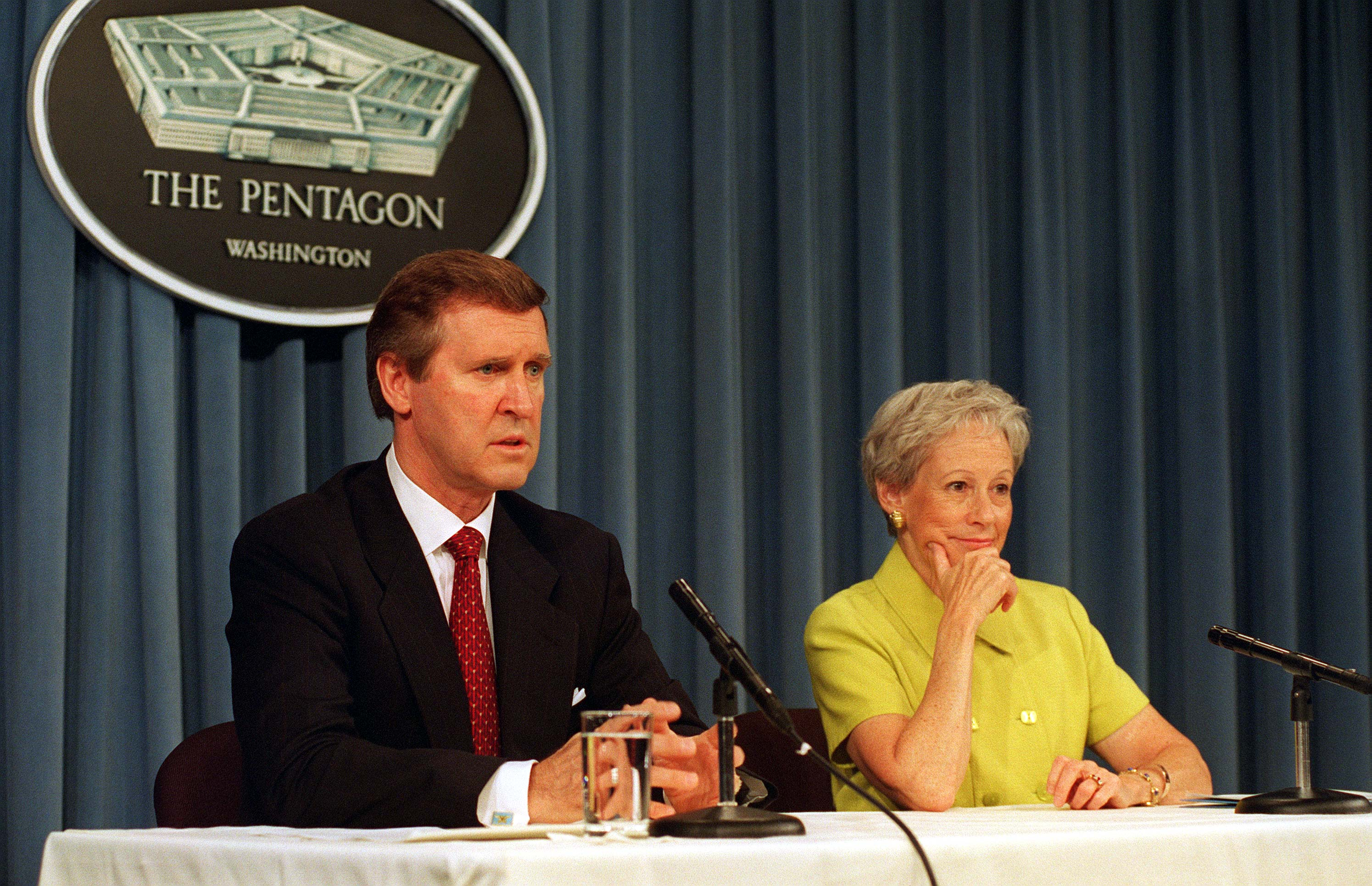
Secretary of Defense William Cohen and Nancy Kassebaum answer a reporter's question during a joint press briefing in 1997.

==== Foreign relations ====
In 1981, Kassebaum became chair of the Senate Subcommittee on African Affairs, and entered the growing controversy surrounding the policy of apartheid in South Africa. She issued a public call for President Reagan and other Republicans to toughen U.S. policy toward the white minority government in Pretoria.

Although President Reagan condemned apartheid, he strongly opposed economic sanctions in favor of a policy of "constructive engagement" despite growing pressure from Congress, including Kassebaum and Senator Richard Lugar (R-IN), the chair of the U.S. Senate Foreign Relations Committee. To break the impasse, the two senators joined key Democrats in supporting targeted sanctions against the South African government, setting specific anti-apartheid goals and conditions, including a demand that South Africa release African National Congress leader Nelson Mandela from prison.

The bi-partisan Comprehensive Anti-Apartheid Act passed the House and Senate by overwhelming margins in 1986, but was then vetoed by President Reagan, forcing Kassebaum and Lugar into a battle against the president and leadership of their own party. On September 29, 1986, the House voted 315–84 to override Reagan's veto. The Senate followed suit three days later on a 78–21 vote, passing the bill into law.

In March 1982, Kassebaum headed a U.S. delegation to observe elections in El Salvador, where the U.S.-backed Revolutionary Government Junta military regime was battling leftist Farabundo Martí National Liberation Front guerrillas in a civil war, while being unable to control far-right paramilitary groups. The heavy turnout on Election Day convinced Kassebaum that the FMLN lacked popular support. Kassebaum became a key member of bi-partisan efforts to support the Salvadoran government with economic and military aid, while pressuring the government on human rights, land reforms, and more effective steps to prevent a FMLN victory. She repeatedly urged the Reagan administration to set a clear policy for a political solution to the civil war while avoiding deeper U.S. military involvement in the region.

==== Domestic policy ====
When Republicans won control of Congress in the 1994 elections, Kassebaum became chair of the U.S. Senate Labor Committee, with broad jurisdiction over federal domestic policy. One of her first actions was to introduce health insurance reform legislation, co-sponsored by the committee's senior Democrat, Ted Kennedy. The bill focused on helping some 25 million workers get health insurance coverage regardless of pre-existing conditions, even when changing or losing a job.

In a year of heated debate, Kassebaum found herself at times opposing amendments from fellow Republicans, including her Kansas colleague, U.S. Senate Majority Leader Bob Dole, and pressuring Kennedy and Democrats to reach compromises. As a result, House and Senate conferees ultimately settled on a final version of the legislation, known as the Kassebaum-Kennedy Act, or the Health Insurance Portability and Accountability Act. The legislation passed overwhelmingly in both houses, and was signed into law by President Bill Clinton, on August 21, 1996.

In her last months in the Senate, Kassebaum also won passage of a new law preserving a beautiful tract of Kansas tallgrass prairie in the national park system. After more than 50 years of controversy, the Tallgrass Prairie National Preserve became a reality just two months before Kassebaum left office. The preserve covered 10,876 acres of land in the Flint Hills. Under Kassebaum's bill, signed into law by President Clinton, the Tallgrass Prairie Preserve is the only NPS unit dedicated to preserving and providing public access to untamed tallgrass prairie that once covered more than 400,000 square miles of the American heartland.

==== Other issues ====
Early in her career, Kassebaum was tapped to serve as Temporary Chairman of the 1980 Republican National Convention. Presiding over the first two days of the convention, her appointment to that role was seen by many as a nod from the Reagan campaign to the moderate and liberal wings of the party. In 1991, Kassebaum was mentioned by Time magazine as a possible running mate for President George H. W. Bush in the 1992 United States presidential election if he chose to replace incumbent Vice President Dan Quayle.

Kassebaum voted for the successful Supreme Court nominations of Sandra Day O'Connor, Antonin Scalia, Anthony M. Kennedy, David H. Souter, Clarence Thomas, Ruth Bader Ginsburg, and Stephen G. Breyer. She also voted for the nomination of Robert Bork, which was rejected by the Senate after controversial nomination hearings. Kassebaum later expressed regret for voting to confirm Thomas to the U.S. Supreme Court in 1991, expressing disappointment in his performance. The year after the hearings, she noted: "I was never once asked by anyone at the White House or by any of my colleagues about how I reacted to Anita Hill's public allegations of sexual harassment, or how I thought the allegations should be handled."

She voted against a proposed U.S. Constitutional amendment that would have allowed Congress and the states to ban or restrict abortions.

Kassebaum voted in favor of establishing Martin Luther King Jr. Day as a federal holiday and the Civil Rights Restoration Act of 1987, including overriding Reagan's veto of the latter.

Prior to completing her third term, on December 7, 1996, Kassebaum married former Republican Senator Howard Baker, who had retired from the U.S. Senate after serving three terms in 1985, including terms as both majority and minority leader.

== Post-political career ==
Kassebaum was elected to the American Philosophical Society in 1996.

After leaving the Senate, Kassebaum served on the Board of Trustees for the Robert Wood Johnson Foundation and the Kaiser Family Foundation. She was Chairman of the National Advisory Committee on Rural Health to the Secretary of Health and Human Services, the George C. Marshall Foundation and the American-Turkish Council. Senator Kassebaum also served on the Board of Directors of the National Committee on U.S.-China Relations, the African Law Institute Council-ABA, and the International Medical Corps.

She remained active on issues such as campaign finance reform. She served on the Americans for Campaign Reform Advisory Committee, and in 1997 President Clinton asked Kassebaum and former Vice President Walter Mondale "to assist in the cause of bipartisan campaign finance reform". Their work resulted in recommendations to revamp campaign finance laws that were delivered to Congress in October.

In 2000, Kassebaum was appointed co-chair of the Presidential Appointee Initiative Advisory Board, a Brookings Institution commission that delivered reform recommendations to the Senate Governmental Affairs Committee.

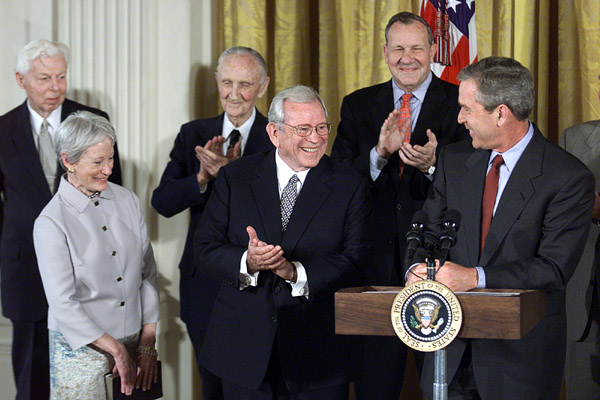
Kassebaum and Howard Baker with President George W. Bush in 2001 at the White House, during the announcement of Baker as the new ambassador to Japan

From 2001 to 2005, Senator Baker served as the United States Ambassador to Japan and Kassebaum accompanied him to Japan, living in Tokyo during this time. Kassebaum was recognized for her work with Baker in Japan, including organizing a regional conference in Tokyo to combat human trafficking in Asia in 2004.

Kassebaum was an Advisory Board member for the Partnership for a Secure America, a not-for-profit organization dedicated to recreating the bipartisan center in American national security and foreign policy. She was also a member of the ReFormers Caucus of Issue One.

She was a noted critic of President Donald Trump. In 2018, she, alongside other incumbent and former Republican politicians, endorsed Laura Kelly, the Democratic candidate and eventual victor, in the 2018 Kansas gubernatorial election. She also endorsed Kelly's successful reelection in 2022. Kassebaum also endorsed Republican-turned-Democrat Barbara Bollier for the 2020 Senate election in Kansas over her Republican opponent Roger Marshall. In 2014, Kassebaum expressed support for same-sex marriage. In 2024, she endorsed Kamala Harris for president.

== Awards ==
Kassebaum was awarded an honorary doctorate from Kansas State University in 2015. Kansas State University also offers the Kassebaum Scholarship, to recognize students who aspire to careers in public service, and up to five students receive this award annually. Her ties to Kansas State University date from 1966, when the Landon Lecture Series on public issues was inaugurated as a tribute to her father, Kansas Gov. Alfred Landon.

Kassebaum was honored by the Native Sons and Daughters of Kansas as a "Distinguished Kansan" in 1978, and she received the Citation for Distinguished Statesmanship in 2000.

In 1985, Kassebaum received the Distinguished Service Citation from her alma mater, the University of Kansas. In 1996, she was awarded the American Library Association Honorary Membership.

In January 2025, Kassebaum was one of twenty recipients of the Presidential Citizens Medal. President Joe Biden cited her bipartisan work in the United States Senate, especially on health care reform.

== Personal life and death ==
In 1955, Kassebaum married John Philip Kassebaum, and they had four children. They separated in 1975, and divorced in March 1979. She then married former U.S. Senator and diplomat Howard Baker of Tennessee on December 7, 1996. After leaving Tokyo in 2005 at the end of his appointment as U.S. Ambassador to Japan, they split time between his home in Huntsville, Tennessee, and her home in Burdick, Kansas. Baker died on June 26, 2014.

Her son, William Kassebaum, is a former member of the Kansas House of Representatives. Her other son, filmmaker Richard Kassebaum, died of a brain tumor on August 27, 2008, at the age of 47. Her daughter, Linda Johnson, died of supranuclear palsy in 2020 at the age of 61.

Nancy Kassebaum died in Manhattan, Kansas, on August 21, 2026, at the age of 94.

== See also ==
- Women in the United States Senate

Party political offices
Preceded by James Pearson	Republican nominee for U.S. Senator from Kansas (Class 2); 1978, 1984, 1990	Succeeded by Pat Roberts
U.S. Senate
Preceded by James Pearson	U.S. Senator (Class 2) from Kansas; 1978–1997; Served alongside: Bob Dole, Sheila Frahm, Sam Brownback	Succeeded by Pat Roberts
Preceded by Orrin Hatch	Ranking Member of the Senate Labor Committee; 1993–1995	Succeeded by Ted Kennedy
Preceded by Ted Kennedy	Chair of the Senate Labor Committee; 1995–1997	Succeeded by Jim Jeffords
