= Great Grape =

Compilation album by Moby Grape
- Released: November 1971
- Recorded: 1967–1969
- Genres: Psychedelic rock; folk rock
- Length: 27:31
- Label: Columbia
- Producer: David Rubinson

Moby Grape chronology
20 Granite Creek (1971)	Great Grape (1971)	Live Grape (1978)

Professional ratings
Review scores
Source	Rating
Allmusic	3/5 stars

Great Grape is a compilation album released by Columbia Records in 1971 that compiles songs from three of Moby Grape's Columbia albums - Moby Grape, Wow, and Moby Grape '69. It has been speculated that Columbia's decision to release this album was based solely on trying to capitalize on any interest generated in Moby Grape by the then-recent release of a new studio album, 20 Granite Creek, on Reprise Records. For some unknown reason the album was never issued on a cassette tape, although it was issued on an 8-Track tape.

== Track listing ==
=== Side one ===
1. "Omaha" (Skip Spence) – 2:22
2. "Murder in My Heart for the Judge" (Jerry Miller, Don Stevenson) – 2:57
3. "Bitter Wind" (Bob Mosley) – 3:04
4. "It's a Beautiful Day Today" (Bob Mosley) – 3:06
5. "Changes" (Jerry Miller, Don Stevenson) – 3:21

=== Side two ===
1. "Motorcycle Irene" (Skip Spence) – 2:23
2. "Trucking Man" (Bob Mosley) – 2:00
3. "Someday" (Jerry Miller, Don Stevenson) – 2:39
4. "8:05" (Jerry Miller, Don Stevenson) – 2:19
5. "Ooh Mama Ooh" (Jerry Miller, Don Stevenson) – 2:25
6. "Naked, If I Want To" (Jerry Miller) – 0:55

== Personnel ==
- Peter Lewis – rhythm guitar, vocals
- Jerry Miller – lead guitar, vocals
- Bob Mosley - bass, vocals
- Skip Spence - rhythm guitar, vocals
- Don Stevenson – drums, vocals
