= The Place and the Time =

Compilation album by Moby Grape
- Released: April 2009
- Recorded: 1967–68
- Genre: Psychedelic rock; folk rock
- Label: Sundazed
- Producer: David Rubinson

Moby Grape chronology
Listen My Friends! The Best of Moby Grape (2007)	The Place and the Time (2009)	Moby Grape Live (2010)

The Place and the Time is a compilation album of demos, outtakes, alternative versions and live versions of songs by Moby Grape, released by Sundazed Music in 2009 in CD and double LP format.

== History ==
The album was released in April 2009, almost ten years to the day after the death of founding band member Skip Spence. Many of the songs were previously released as bonus tracks to CD releases of Moby Grape albums by Sundazed Music. The compilation was produced by David Rubinson, who was also the band's original producer. The title is from a song written by Jerry Miller and Don Stevenson on the Wow/Grape Jam album set, originally released in 1968.

== Reception ==
Professional ratings
Review scores
Source	Rating
Allmusic	4.5/5 stars
Mojo	4/5 stars
Rolling Stone	favorable

As described by one reviewer, "If you’re not convinced Moby Grape (was) one of the hippest, baddest, realest, and rawest bands of the late 1960s, then grab this new outtakes and live cuts compilation from Sundazed and try to explain otherwise." As described by David Fricke of Rolling Stone, "these rarities - among them rowdy audition tracks and Moby Grape outtakes - are a dynamic alternate portrait of the star-crossed San Francisco band at work, fusing pop, soul, blues and country with psychedelic zeal." As described in Mojo, "...the imperfections accentuate Grape's never-played-safe, gutsy rock'n'roll. There are moments when it sounds like the music is going to explode into chaos, but these professionals could take it to the edge and pull it back at the abyss. Jerry Miller is a guitar god, Peter Lewis a folk-rock master, Bob Mosley a muscular bassist and blue-eyed soulman extraodinaire, Don Stevenson a driver of a drummer and more, and Skip Spence is a one of rock's most original madmen. Why they don't make 'em like Moby Grape any more is arguable- but they don't."

Mark Deming of Allmusic wrote:

(...) these outtakes, demos, live recordings, and stray items cohere [sic] into a fine portrait of what made Moby Grape one of the great (if underappreciated [sic]) bands of their era. (...) the live tapes capture Moby Grape in full flight before the dream began to collapse, and offer a tantalizing picture of how powerful they must have been on a good night. (...) this music demonstrates why Moby Grape still matters to so many all these years later.

== Track listing ==
=== Disc 1 ===
1. "Indifference" Columbia Records audition recording (1967)
2. "Looper" Columbia Records audition recording (1967)
3. "Stop" Demo recording (1967)
4. "Rounder" Instrumental outtake recording from the Moby Grape sessions (1967)
5. "Sweet Ride (Never Again)" Unedited version, recorded for the motion picture The Sweet Ride (1967)
6. "Loosely Remembered" Demo recording (1967)
7. "The Place and the Time" Alternate version from the Wow album sessions (1967)
8. "Bitter Wind" Demo recording (1967)
9. "Seeing" Alternate version from the Wow album sessions (1968)
10. "What's to Choose" Alternate version from the Wow album sessions (1968)
11. "Miller's Blues"* Alternate version from the Wow album sessions (1968)
12. "Soul Stew" Outtake recording from the Moby Grape '69 album sessions (1968)
13. "If You Can't Learn From My Mistakes" Demo recording (1968)

=== Disc 2 ===
1. "You Can Do Anything" Demo recording (1967)
2. "Skip's Song" Demo recording (1967)
3. "It's a Beautiful Day Today" Demo recording (1968)
4. "What's to Choose" Demo recording (1967)
5. "Hoochie" Demo recording (1968)
6. "Big" Demo recording (1968)
7. "Rounder" Live recording (1968)
8. "Miller's Blues" Live recording (1968)
9. "Changes" Live recording (1968)
10. "Looper" Demo recording (1967)
11. "Soul Stew" Instrumental outtake recording from the Moby Grape '69 album sessions (1968)
12. "Cockatoo Blues (Tongue-Tied)" Demo recording (1968)
  - Bonus track available only on double LP

== Personnel ==
- Peter Lewis – rhythm guitar, vocals
- Bob Mosley – bass, vocals
- Jerry Miller – lead guitar, vocals
- Skip Spence – rhythm guitar, vocals
- Don Stevenson – drums, vocals
