= Listen My Friends! The Best of Moby Grape =

Greatest hits album by Moby Grape
- Released: 2007
- Genre: Psychedelic rock; folk rock
- Label: Columbia

Moby Grape chronology
Crosstalk: The Best of Moby Grape (2004)	Listen My Friends! The Best of Moby Grape (2007)	The Place and the Time (2009)

Professional ratings
Review scores
Source	Rating
Allmusic	4/5 stars

Listen My Friends! The Best of Moby Grape is a compilation album by Moby Grape, released in 2007 by Columbia Records as part of its "Legacy" series. The title of the album is a reference to lyrics repeated in the song "Omaha" on the group's debut album.

== History ==
The compilation was released in the year following a final judicial determination that the members of Moby Grape had a right to ownership of the band name and related royalties, rather than their former manager, Matthew Katz. As noted rock music reviewer Richie Unterberger commented, "...almost every track is impressive, making a case for the band as one of the '60s outfits who most adeptly blended rock, folk, blues, and country with touches of psychedelia, also showing their post-1967 stuff (at least the best of it) to be sturdier than it is usually remembered as."

== Track listing ==
1. "Hey Grandma" (Miller, Stevenson) – 2:46
2. "Mr. Blues" (Mosley) – 2:01
3. "8:05" (Miller, Stevenson) – 2:22
4. "Omaha" (Spence) – 2:46
5. "Sitting by the Window" (Lewis) – 2:46
6. "Indifference" (Spence) – 4:16
7. "Bitter Wind" [Version One] (Mosley) – 2:40
8. "Murder in My Heart for the Judge" (Miller, Stevenson) – 3:00
9. "Can't Be So Bad" (Miller, Stevenson) – 3:27
10. "He" (Lewis) – 3:39
11. "Motorcycle Irene" (Spence) – 2:26
12. "Rose Colored Eyes" (Mosley) – 4:03
13. "Sweet Ride (Never Again)" (Lewis, Miller, Mosley, Spence, Stevenson) – 5:57
14. "Ooh Mama Ooh" (Miller, Stevenson) – 2:30
15. "Ain't That a Shame" (Lewis, Miller, Stevenson) – 2:32
16. "If You Can't Learn from My Mistakes" (Lewis) – 2:36
17. "Going Nowhere" (Miller, Stevenson) – 2:05
18. "Seeing" (Spence) – 3:47
19. "Changes, Circles Spinning" (Lewis) – 2:27
20. "Truly Fine Citizen" (Dell'Ara) – 2:48

== Personnel ==
- Peter Lewis – rhythm guitar, vocals
- Bob Mosley – bass, vocals
- Jerry Miller – lead guitar, vocals
- Skip Spence – rhythm guitar, vocals
- Don Stevenson – drums, vocals
