= Legendary Grape =

Studio album by Moby Grape
- Released: 1989
- Genre: Country rock; roots rock
- Length: 33:18
- Producer: Mindy Giles, Dennis Newhall

Moby Grape chronology
Moby Grape '84 (1984)	Legendary Grape (1989)	Vintage: The Very Best of Moby Grape (1993)

Legendary Grape is the seventh and final studio album by American rock band Moby Grape. It was originally released as a limited edition cassette tape in 1989, and subsequently reissued on vinyl record and compact disc in 2003.

== History ==
The original album was issued in 1989 as a five hundred copy, cassette-only release on Herman Records. The album was at the time credited to The Melvilles, being one of the names used by Moby Grape during the course of their protracted dispute with former manager Matthew Katz over ownership of the band name and related royalties. The tapes were remastered by Dig Music, and eight additional songs were added for the release of Legendary Grape.

The album was recorded by original Moby Grape members Peter Lewis, Jerry Miller, Bob Mosley and Don Stevenson. All group members contributed songs, as had been the case during all of the band's history. However, whereas in the past Jerry Miller and Don Stevenson had generally written together, including some of Moby Grape's best known songs, both were now writing exclusively separately. Founding member Skip Spence was not well enough to perform, though one of his songs was included on the recording. It was the practice of Spence's bandmates to try to include at least one of his songs on every Moby Grape recording, irrespective of Spence's ability to participate in the recording.

Shortly after the album's original release, Bob Mosley, who was subject to the challenges of schizophrenia, as was Spence, commenced a period of homelessness that lasted approximately five years, until recovering through the assistance of bandmate Peter Lewis, among others.

== Track listing ==
1989 release

Side A
No.	Title	Writer(s)	Length
1.	"Give It Hell"	Jerry Miller	2:55
2.	"On The Dime"	Miller	3:50
3.	"Bitter Wind in Tanganika"	Bob Mosley	3:33
4.	"Lady of the Night"	Miller	3:42
5.	"Took It All Away"	Mosley	3:06
Total length:			17:09

Side B
No.	Title	Writer(s)	Length
6.	"Nighttime Rider"	Mosley	3:07
7.	"Talk About Love (I'm Talking About You"	Chuck Berry	1:57
8.	"All My Life"	Skip Spence	3:36
9.	"You'll Never Know"	Miller	4:15
10.	"You Can Depend on Me"	Mosley	3:09
Total length:			16:09

== Personnel ==
- Peter Lewis – rhythm guitar, vocals
- Jerry Miller – lead guitar, vocals
- Bob Mosley - bass, vocals
- Don Stevenson – drums, vocals

Additional personnel

- Dan Abernathy - rhythm guitar

== Other Credits ==
- Mindy Giles - Associate Producer
- Dennis Newhall - Reissue Producer
- Don Stevenson - Engineer
- Robert Farrell - Mastering
- Martin de Anda - Artwork, Graphic Design, Design
- David Fricke - Liner Notes
