= Fine Wine (Fine Wine album) =

Studio album by Fine Wine
- Released: 1976
- Label: Polydor

Fine Wine is an album released in 1976 by Polydor Records in Germany, by a group of the same name. The four-person group included two members of Moby Grape, Jerry Miller and Bob Mosley, who also wrote or co-wrote most of the songs on the album. For these reasons, the album is often regarded as a Moby Grape album.

== History ==
After the 1971 release of 20 Granite Creek, Moby Grape broke up for the second time in as many years. Jerry Miller and Bob Mosley later joined with Michael Been on rhythm guitar and John Craviotto on drums to form Fine Wine. The band toured for several years and released one eponymous album, prior to Miller joining another reformation of Moby Grape, with Peter Lewis and Skip Spence. Mosley and Craviotto joined with Neil Young to form The Ducks, which performed in the Santa Cruz area during much of 1977, as did the reformed Moby Grape during the same period.

Despite having never been released in North America or later released on CD, the album is notable in particular as a continuation of the musical directions of Miller and Mosley, as well as for the developing musical directions of Been.

== Track listing ==
1. "Got To Get Back Home" (Mosley) 3:11
2. "As Near As I Can Tell" (Been) 2:49
3. "If You Feel Like Dancin'" (Miller) 2:37
4. "Cold Heart" (Miller) 4:06
5. "Heaven Knows" (Been) 2:56
6. "8:05" (Miller, Stevenson) 2:24
7. "I'll Never Be Lonely Again" (Been) 3:47
8. "Step Right Up" (Miller) 2:14
9. "Shadow of Yourself" (Mosley) 3:08
10. "Talkin' 'Bout You" (Miller) 2:39
11. "Everything's Gonna Be Alright" (Been) 2:09
12. "I Wonder If It's All Worth It?" (Miller, Been) 3:33
