= Live Grape =

Live album by Moby Grape
- Released: 1978
- Recorded: 1977–1978
- Venue: The Shady Grove, San Francisco; The Inn of the Beginning, Cotati, California
- Genre: Country rock; folk rock; blues rock
- Length: 48:44
- Label: Escape Records
- Producer: John Chesleigh

Moby Grape chronology
Great Grape (1972)	Live Grape (1978)	Moby Grape '84 (1984)

Professional ratings
Review scores
Source	Rating
Allmusic	3/5 stars

Live Grape is a 1978 album by Moby Grape, released by Escape Records, of live performances of the band at two venues in California, the Shady Grove in San Francisco and the Inn of the Beginning in Cotati.

== History ==
The album features core members Peter Lewis, Jerry Miller and Skip Spence. Original members Bob Mosley and Don Stevenson did not participate in the recordings, though Bob Mosley did appear with the band on occasion during this period. At the time, band members were in a protracted legal dispute with former manager Matthew Katz over ownership of the Moby Grape band name. As a result, Moby Grape is not named anywhere on the cover.

The album was originally released by Escape Records in 1978. It was reissued on CD by Line Records in 1994 and Akarma Records in 2007.

== Track listing ==
1. "That Lost Horizon" (Lewis) – 4:52
2. "Here I Sit" (Miller) – 2:38
3. "Honky Tonk" (Butler, Bill Doggett, Clifford Scott, Shep Shepherd) – 5:20
4. "Cuttin' In" (Johnny "Guitar" Watson) – 4:54
5. "Must Be Goin' Now Dear" (Spence) – 3:34
6. "Your Rider" (Lewis, Powell) – 3:12
7. "Up In The Air" (Lewis) – 3:53
8. "Set Me Down Easy" (Bumpus) – 5:00
9. "Love You So Much" (Miller) – 3:36
10. "You Got Everything I Need" (Miller) – 11:27

== Personnel ==
- Peter Lewis - rhythm guitar, vocals
- Jerry Miller - lead guitar, vocals
- Skip Spence - rhythm guitar, drums, vocals

Additional personnel

- Cornelius Bumpus - keyboards, saxophone, vocals
- John Oxendine - drums
- Chris Powell - bass
- Daniel Spencer - drums

== Other Credits ==
- John Chesleigh - Producer
- John Timms – Engineer
- Richard Curtis – Design
