= Moby Grape '84 =

Studio album by Moby Grape
- Released: 1984
- Genre: Country rock; folk rock
- Length: 43:40
- Producer: Matthew Katz

Moby Grape chronology
Live Grape (1978)	Moby Grape '84 (1984)	Legendary Grape (1989)

Professional ratings
Review scores
Source	Rating
Allmusic	3/5 stars

Moby Grape '84 is a 1984 album released by Moby Grape on the San Francisco Sound label. It is also known as "Silver Wheels" album, after the introductory song on the album, and as the "Heart Album", as referenced to the album cover.

== History ==
The album is notable in that it is produced by the band's former manager Matthew Katz, who also owned the San Francisco Sound label. Paradoxically, since the early 1970s, Moby Grape had been in litigation with Katz over ownership of the band name and related royalties; at the time of recording the album, matters had not been resolved.

== Track listing ==
1. "Silver Wheels" (Peter Lewis, Vince Megna) 3:24
2. "Better Day" (Bob Mosley, Skip Spence) 2:50
3. "Hard Road to Follow" (Lewis, Mosley) 3:59
4. "Sitting and Watching" (Mosley) 3:36
5. "City Lights" (Mosley) 3:35
6. "Queen of the Crow" (Mosley) 3:29
7. "Lost Horizon" (Lewis) 3:47
8. "I Didn't Lie to You" (Mosley) 3:43
9. "Suzzam" (Richard Dean, Sue Lebow) 2:59
10. "Too Old to Boogie" (Jerry Miller, Don Stevenson) 3:00
11. "Think It Over" (Lewis) 3:32
12. "American Dream" (Dean, Lebow) 4:29
13. "Reprise" 1:49

== Personnel ==
- Peter Lewis – rhythm guitar, vocals
- Jerry Miller – lead guitar, vocals
- Bob Mosley - bass, vocals
- Don Stevenson – drums, vocals
- Richard Phillip Dean - (piano, arranger, vocals)
