= Dale Ockerman =

American keyboardist, guitarist and songwriter

Dale Ockerman is an American keyboardist, guitarist and songwriter, who has worked with a variety of internationally recognized musicians since the late 1960s. He is best known for his association with the Doobie Brothers, where he was principal keyboardist and a guitarist with the reformed version of the band during the 1988–1996 period.

== History ==
Prior to joining the Doobie Brothers, Ockerman had toured and co-written songs with Doobie Brothers' guitarist Patrick Simmons during the latter's solo tours. Two of his songs have been recorded by The Doobie Brothers and he appears on three of the CDs issued by the band. He also has a long-standing association with members of Moby Grape, and has contributed to the solo work of Jerry Miller and Bob Mosley. The Grape's Peter Lewis thought highly enough of 16-year-old Ockerman's talent that Lewis loaned him some of his prized guitars, a Martin D-28 and a Black Les Paul custom for a year, to further develop his playing skills.

Ockerman's first professional performance was with the Quicksilver Messenger Service in 1971, when the band performed during the last weekend of Bill Graham's Fillmore West in San Francisco. After Quicksilver Messenger Service, Ockerman played with a number of California-based acts, including IAM, Snail, Airtight, The Ducks, Bill Champlin, Rita Coolidge, Steve Marriott, Tom Johnston, Michael McDonald and Coco Montoya. He also played with New Orleans musicians Zigaboo Modeliste, George Porter, The Wild Magnolias and Cyril Neville. He also recorded with many of these performers, as well as working as a session musician with Bill Champlin and Jim Keltner, including a re-recording of "Nature Boy", the 1940s number one hit for Nat King Cole, with song author, Eden Ahbez. Dale played piano, Prophet 5. guitar, melodica, and trumpet solo.

== Recent activities ==
In recent years, Ockerman has been based in Santa Cruz, California, and has appeared regularly playing piano, guitar, trumpet, mandolin, and harmonica with the White Album Ensemble, a group devoted to recreating Beatles music that was not performed by The Beatles in concert. The White Album Ensemble, as described by Dale Ockerman: "Since 2003, an eight to fifteen piece ensemble performing live versions of Beatles albums that the fabs themselves never performed live, beginning with Rubber Soul, through Revolver, Sgt. Pepper's, Magical Mystery Tour, The White Album, Let It Be, and Abbey Road. They use sitar, tablas, dilrhuba, tamboura, string quartets, choirs, whatever it takes to get the vibe across of the 'classics of our time'". The group has played numerous concerts with the Santa Cruz County Symphony.

In 2008, members of the White Album Ensemble (Dale Ockerman, Doobie Bros bassist Tiran Porter and Stephen Krilanovich) joined Omar Spence in tribute concerts featuring the music of his late father, Moby Grape co-founder Skip Spence. The two concerts, at the Rio Theatre in Santa Cruz, and Don Quixote's International Music Hall in Felton, were recorded in anticipation of later 2009 release. Ockerman and Omar Spence met at Skip's memorial, where they jammed with Moby Grape. Skip was a founder and lead vocalist on the hit "Omaha". In 2012 Dale had Omar sing a few "John" songs on his latest album "What if...?" which also features ex-Doobie singer Richard Bryant as the "Paul" singer. Inspired by the success of the White Album Ensemble, Ockerman went on to form a Rolling Stones music group, the Beggar Kings, focusing strictly on the "golden age" of Stones albums, the Jimmy Miller produced Beggars Banquet, Let It Bleed, Sticky Fingers, and Exile On Main Street. The quick success of that has led to "Stones opening for Beatles" tongue-in-cheek concerts with strings, horns and choir.

Ockerman is also associated with Musicscool in Capitola, California, which was inspired by the film School of Rock. Ockerman teaches guitar, keyboards and other instruments, as well as bandcoaching, and using the school as a recording studio for two CDs. The school features a Hammond B3 organ and Leslie, once played by Booker T. Jones and Jimmy Smith, as well as a vintage Wurlitzer piano, Clavinet, and numerous guitars basses and percussion instruments.

A group of Ockerman's young guitar and keyboard students, ages 11 and up, have performed concerts in Santa Cruz as GuitArmy - an "army of guitars", performing mostly Led Zeppelin songs, replicating all song parts and overdubs, such as blending electric, acoustic, slide, and twelve string guitars, as well as piano, organ and clavinet. GuitArmy features professional musicians Tiran Porter on bass and David Tucker, former (Maria Muldaur,([Tommy Castro]) drummer and Musicscool teacher) on drums. Lead vocalist James Durbin, then 19, also guested with the White Album Ensemble's "Across the Universe" concert in December 2008 and received a standing ovation for his vocal on "While My Guitar Gently Weeps". Durbin was the focus of the Musicscool's Guitarmy, doing mostly ([Led Zeppelin]) songs. Next Durbin passed the audition and whizzed up to the finals, rose to #3 on American Idol in 2011. The "Homecoming concert" had American Idol calling Dale to put together a backup group for James, so Dale used the White Album Ensemble, adding horns and female vocalists. It was at 30,000 people the largest concert in Santa Cruz history. After some touring, Durbin called Ockerman from Turkey, with an idea to put GuitArmy back together, and perform a Doors / Led Zeppelin concert, which sold out (the band was all Musicscool Alumni).
