= Truly Fine Citizen =

Studio album by Moby Grape
- Released: July 30, 1969
- Recorded: May 27–29, 1969
- Studio: Columbia (Nashville, Tennessee)
- Genre: Folk rock; country rock
- Length: 29:54
- Label: Columbia
- Producer: Bob Johnston

Moby Grape chronology
Moby Grape '69 (1969)	Truly Fine Citizen (1969)	20 Granite Creek (1971)

Truly Fine Citizen is the fourth studio album by American rock band Moby Grape. It was released on July 30, 1969, by Columbia Records. After completing the album, the band went on hiatus until 1971 when they reunited with Skip Spence and Bob Mosley to record the reunion album, 20 Granite Creek.

== Background ==
After the departure of Bob Mosley, the remaining trio headed to Nashville where they cut this album in just three days with legendary Columbia Records producer Bob Johnston. This album fulfilled the band's contract with Columbia Records. At the time, the band was in the midst of legal disputes with their manager, Matthew Katz, with the result that certain songs written by band members were instead credited to their road manager, Tim Dell'Ara. In particular, songs written by Jerry Miller and Don Stevenson became Tim Dell'Ara songs, to counter Matthew Katz withholding royalties on previous recordings.

Replacing Bob Mosley on bass was famed Nashville session musician Bob Moore, who had played bass on many Elvis Presley sessions and was one of the founders of Monument Records, for many years the recording home of Roy Orbison.

== Critical reception ==
Professional ratings
Review scores
Source	Rating
Allmusic	3/5 stars
Rolling Stone original	negative
Rolling Stone	1.5/5 stars

In a contemporary review for The Village Voice, music critic Robert Christgau gave the album a "C+" and wrote, "In which what should have been America's greatest rock group gasps its last. Quite mediocre, despite a couple of lovely Peter Lewis songs."

== Track listing ==
=== Side one ===
1. "Changes, Circles Spinning" (Peter Lewis) – 2:27
2. "Looper" (Lewis) – 3:02
3. "Truly Fine Citizen" (Tim Dell'Ara) – 1:47
4. "Beautiful Is Beautiful" (Dell'Ara) – 2:29
5. "Love Song" (Dell'Ara) – 2:22

=== Side two ===
1. "Right Before My Eyes" (Lewis) – 2:02
2. "Open Up Your Heart" (Dell'Ara) – 2:36
3. "Now I Know High" (Lewis) – 6:10
4. "Treat Me Bad" (Dell'Ara) – 2:17
5. "Tongue-Tied" (Jerry Miller, Skip Spence) – 2:01
6. "Love Song, Part Two" (Dell'Ara) – 2:41

=== Bonus tracks on 2007 CD edition ===
1. "Rounder" [Live] (Spence) – 2:02
2. "Miller’s Blues" [Live] (Miller, Bob Mosley) – 6:06
3. "Changes" [Live] (Miller, Don Stevenson) – 4:17
4. "Skip’s Song" ["Seeing" Demo] (Spence) – 3:26
5. "Looper" [Demo, previously unreleased] (Lewis) – 2:06
6. "Soul Stew" [Instrumental, previously unreleased] (Mosley) – 2:18
7. "Cockatoo Blues" ["Tongue-Tied" Demo, previously unreleased] (Miller, Spence) – 3:41

== Personnel ==
- Peter Lewis - rhythm guitar, vocals
- Jerry Miller - lead guitar, vocals
- Don Stevenson - drums, vocals

Additional personnel

- Bob Moore - bass

== Charts ==
Album - Billboard

Year	Chart	Position
1969	Pop Albums	157
