= Crosstalk: The Best of Moby Grape =

Greatest hits album by Moby Grape
- Released: 2004
- Genre: Psychedelic rock; folk rock
- Length: 60:04
- Label: Sony International

Moby Grape chronology
Vintage: The Very Best of Moby Grape (1993)	Crosstalk: The Best of Moby Grape (2004)	Listen My Friends! The Best of Moby Grape (2007)

Crosstalk: The Best of Moby Grape is a 2004 compilation album by Moby Grape, released by Sony International. It was released at a time when the legal status of ownership of Moby Grape recordings was uncertain.

== Track listing ==
1. "Hey Grandma" (Miller, Stevenson) – 2:45
2. "Fall on You" (Lewis) – 1:55
3. "8.05" (Miller, Stevenson) – 2:21
4. "Come in the Morning" (Mosley) – 2:17
5. "Omaha" (Spence) – 2:45
6. "Rounder" [instrumental] (Spence) – 2:03
7. "Changes" (Miller, Stevenson) – 3:24
8. "Murder in My Heart for the Judge" (Miller, Stevenson) – 2:59
9. "Bitter Wind" (Mosley) – 3:07
10. "Can't Be So Bad" Miller, Stevenson – 3:26
11. "He" (Lewis) – 3:37
12. "Motorcycle Irene" (Spence) – 2:26
13. "Ooh Mama Ooh" (Miller, Stevenson) – 2:28
14. "Ain't That a Shame" (Lewis, Miller, Stephenson) – 2:30
15. "Captain Nemo" (Miller, Stevenson) – 1:46
16. "What's to Choose" (Lewis) – 1:57
17. "Going Nowhere" (Miller, Stevenson) – 2:04
18. "I Am Not Willing" (Lewis) – 3:00
19. "It's a Beautiful Day Today" (Mosley) – 3:07
20. "Right Before My Eyes" (Lewis) – 2:05
21. "Changes, Circles, Spinning" [Album Version] (Lewis) – 2:27
22. "Truly Fine Citizen" (Tim Dell'Ara) – 1:49
23. "Looper" [Album Version] (Lewis) – 3:02
24. "Hoochie" (Mosley) – 4:24

== Personnel ==
- Peter Lewis – rhythm guitar, vocals
- Jerry Miller – lead guitar, vocals
- Bob Mosley - bass, vocals
- Skip Spence – rhythm guitar, vocals
- Don Stevenson – drums, vocals
