= Vintage: The Very Best of Moby Grape =

Greatest hits album by Moby Grape
- Released: May 11, 1993
- Recorded: 1967–1969
- Genre: Psychedelic rock; folk rock
- Length: 133:33
- Label: Columbia, Legacy
- Producer: Bob Johnston

Moby Grape chronology
Legendary Grape (1990)	Vintage: The Very Best of Moby Grape (1993)	Crosstalk: The Best of Moby Grape (2004)

Professional ratings
Review scores
Source	Rating
Allmusic	4.5/5 stars
Robert Christgau	B+
Encyclopedia of Popular Music	5/5 stars

Vintage: The Very Best of Moby Grape is a retrospective collection of Moby Grape songs, many previously unreleased, originally issued in 1993 as part of Columbia Records' "Rock Artifacts" series. Included in the collection was the entire eponymous first album of the group, generally considered to be one of the most important albums of its era. Noted rock critic David Fricke wrote the liner notes to the compilation.

== Track listing ==
=== Disc One ===
1. "Hey Grandma" (Miller, Stevenson) 2:45
2. "Mr. Blues" (Mosley) 2:00
3. "Fall on You" (Lewis) 2:50
4. 8:05 (Miller, Stevenson) 2:33
5. "Come in the Morning" (Mosley) 2:17
6. "Omaha" (Spence) 2:45
7. "Naked, If I Want To" (Miller) :57
8. Rounder [instrumental] (Spence) 2:03
9. "Someday" (Miller, Spence, Stevenson) 3:31
10. "Ain't No Use" (Miller, Stevenson) 1:40
11. "Sitting by the Window" (Lewis) 2:47
12. "Changes" (Miller, Stevenson) 3:24
13. "Lazy Me" (Mosley) 1:47
14. "Indifference" (Spence) 4:15
15. "Looper" [Audition Version] (Lewis) 2:39
16. "Sweet Ride" (Lewis, Miller, Mosley, Spence, Stevenson) 3:12
17. "Bitter Wind" [Alternate Version] (Mosley) 2:39
18. "The Place and the Time" [Alternate Version] (Miller, Stevenson)
19. "Rounder" [live at the Winterland Ballroom, San Francisco - March 22, 1968] (Spence) 2:02
20. "Miller's Blues" [live at the Winterland Ballroom, San Francisco - March 22, 1968] (Miller) 6:07
21. "Changes" [live at the Winterland Ballroom, San Francisco - March 22, 1968] (Miller, Stevenson) 4:20
22. "Hey Grandma" [mono single version] (Miller, Stevenson) 2:32
23. "Omaha" [mono single version] (Spence) 2:23
24. "Big" (Miller, Stevenson) 4:44
- Tracks 1, 2, 3, 4, 5, 6, 7, 9, 10, 11, 12, 13, 14 taken from Columbia CS 9494 Moby Grape

=== Disc Two ===
1. "Skip's Song" [demo version] (Spence) 3:24
2. "You Can Do Anything" [demo version] (Spence) 2:50
3. "Murder in My Heart for the Judge" (Miller, Stevenson) 2:59
4. "Bitter Wind" (Mosley) 3:07
5. "Can't Be So Bad" (Miller, Stevenson) 3:26
6. "Just Like Gene Autry: A Foxtrot" (Spence) 2:56 With Lou Waxman and His Orchestra
7. "He" (Lewis) 3:37
8. "Motorcycle Irene" (Spence) 2:25
9. "Funky-Tunk" (Spence) 2:13
10. "Rose Colored Eyes" (Mosley) 4:20
11. "If You Can't Learn From My Mistakes" [Peter Lewis Solo Version] )(Lewis) 1:26
12. "Ooh Mama Ooh" (Miller, Stevenson) 2:28
13. "Ain't That a Shame" (Lewis, Miller, Stevenson) 2:30
14. "Trucking Man" (Mosley) 2:02
15. "Captain Nemo" (Miller, Stevenson) 1:46
16. "What's to Choose" (Lewis) 1:57
17. "Going Nowhere" (Miller, Stevenson) 2:04
18. "I Am Not Willing" (Lewis) 3:00
19. "It's a Beautiful Day Today" (Mosley) 3:07
20. "Right Before My Eyes" (Lewis) 2:05
21. "Truly Fine Citizen" (Dell'Ara) 1:49
22. "Hoochie" (Mosley) 4:25
23. "Soul Stew" (Mosley) 2:20
24. "Seeing" (Spence) 8:06*
- Following a few seconds of silence there are two hidden tracks on Disc Two. One is an out-take from the recording sessions of "Just Like Gene Autry: A Foxtrot" where Arthur Godfrey records his spoken introduction to the song. The second is an original radio advertisement for the album Truly Fine Citizen.
- Tracks 3, 4, 5, 6, 7, 8, 9, 10 taken from Columbia CS 9613 Wow
- Tracks 12, 13, 14, 15, 16, 17, 18, 19, 22, 24 taken from Columbia CS 9696 Moby Grape '69
- Tracks 20, 21 taken from Columbia CS 9912 Truly Fine Citizen
