= Oar (album) =

Studio album by Alexander Spence
- Released: May 19, 1969
- Recorded: December 3–12, 1968
- Studio: Columbia (Nashville, Tennessee)
- Genre: Psychedelic folk; folk rock; psychedelic rock
- Length: 44:38
- Label: Columbia
- Producer: Alexander Spence

Alternative cover
- Cover of 2018 deluxe box set AndOarAgain

Oar is the only studio album by American singer-songwriter Alexander "Skip" Spence, released on May 19, 1969, by Columbia Records. It was recorded over seven days in December 1968 in Nashville, and features Spence on all of the instruments.

== Background ==
Described as "one of the most harrowing documents of pain and confusion ever made", the album was recorded after Spence had spent six months in Bellevue Hospital. Spence had been committed to Bellevue following a delusion-driven attempt to attack Moby Grape bandmates Don Stevenson and Jerry Miller with a fire axe.

At the time of Spence's release from hospital, he had written a number of songs that he wanted to record. Producer David Rubinson suggested that Spence record at the Columbia Studios in Nashville, where there was a particularly patient recording engineer, Mike Figlio. Rubinson instructed Figlio to keep the tapes running at all times, to record everything that Spence did. The majority of the tracks were recorded using a three-track recorder. Rubinson chose to stay away from the studio, concerned that Spence's recording activities would be distracted by the presence of a producer.

According to Spence, the Nashville sessions were intended by him to only be a demo, which he gave to Rubinson with the intent that the songs would be fleshed out with full production for the actual album. Instead, Rubinson had the demo recordings released by Columbia.

== Release and reception ==
Professional ratings
Review scores
Source	Rating
Allmusic	4.5/5 stars
Crawdaddy!	(favorable)
Rolling Stone	(favorable)
Robert Christgau	C−

When first released, Oar was not promoted by Columbia Records, despite pleadings from Rubinson. It was at the time the lowest-selling album in Columbia Records history and was deleted from the Columbia catalogue within a year of its release.

In June of 1968, Alexander "Skip" Spence was admitted into the Psychiatric Ward of New York's Bellevue Hospital in lower Manhattan, putting an end to a highly creative period of his life. Oddly, it also signalled the beginning of his most prolific writing cycle. Unbeknownst to everyone involved with his career at that point, Bellevue provided Spence the safety he needed and the time to create what was to become his best-known work.

— Andrew Lau, "Oar After 40 Years: Brilliant or Mere Ramblings?"

As described by critic Ross Bennett:

Combining the ramblings of a man on the brink of mental collapse with some real moments of flippancy and laughter, Oar is a genuinely strange record. Unsurprisingly, the journey from "Little Hands"' Grape-esque guitar grooves to "Grey / Afro"'s terrifying nine minutes of mantric drone, isn't an easy one. Even when Spence builds his songs around a familiar sound (primarily minimalist country-folk) unsettling oddities and ominous modulations creep in.

The album is viewed by critic Lindsay Planer as follows:

A common motif to this album is the presence of saints and demons. Even the straightforward narratives such as the love ballad "Broken Heart" or "Cripple Creek" — which feature vocal treatments reminiscent of folkie Fred Neil — are bathed in unusual chord sequences and lyrical double-entendre. The majority of the sounds on this long-player remain teetering near the precipice of sanity.

The album is viewed by critic John Reed in the Boston Globe:

When former Moby Grape guitarist/singer Alexander "Skip" Spence died in April, it was another sad footnote in the unfruitful saga of one of rock's most multi-talented, but terminally inauspicious, bands. Spence's lone solo disc, Oar, is a quickly recorded document of songs he penned during a 6-month stay at Bellevue Hospital. The dour tone of that time in Spence's life may explain the album's large amount of nondiscernible lyrics. He seems at times to purposely muffle them, making him a pioneer of unintelligible vocal chic long before R.E.M. And Spence's guitar—once unbridled during Moby Grape sessions—is understated, yet ethereal enough to echo the pained state of his soul. "Weighted Down (The Prison Song)" is a seemingly distant cousin of "Hey Joe," with Spence jealously asking a mate, "Whose socks were you darning, darling, while I've been gone so long?" A generous 10 bonus tracks have been added to the original 12. Chronic health issues kept Spence from being creatively active as a solo artist, but overall, Oar is a radiant endeavor.

Subsequent reissues have added ten more songs, in different stages of completion, to the original dozen. The original release ended with a fade out of "Grey / Afro". The 1999 Sony / Sundazed reissue appends "This Time He Has Come" to a fade-less "Grey / Afro", which reflects how the two songs appeared on the master tapes.

The first CD reissue of Oar was released by Sony Special Products in 1991 and was totally remixed from the multitrack masters. This was the first release of the fadeless "Grey / Afro" along with four outtakes from the sessions. The newer Sundazed reissue uses the original 1968 mix master tapes for the first time and added a further six unreleased tracks.

In 1999, the Birdman label of Burbank, California released a tribute album titled More Oar: A Tribute To The Skip Spence Album. It featured covers of the original record's tracks by Robert Plant, Robyn Hitchcock, Tom Waits, Greg Dulli, Mark Lanegan, Beck, Diesel Park West, Mudhoney, and others.

In September 2018, another reissue, of a three-CD / three-LP boxed set, titled AndOarAgain was released by label Modern Harmonic. It included two discs / LPs of previously unreleased tracks; 36 tracks on discs 2 and 3 were previously unreleased at all.

In 2019, for Record Store Day, a 7" single of "I Want A Rock & Roll Band" backed with a previously unreleased version of "I Got A Lot To Say / Mary Jane" was released by label Modern Harmonic.

It was voted number 510 in the third edition of Colin Larkin's All Time Top 1000 Albums (2000).

In November 2009, as part of his "Record Club" series, Beck began posting the videos of his complete version of Oar on his website (www.beck.com), recorded with members of Wilco, Feist, Jamie Lidell, James Gadson, Brian LeBarton, and others the previous June.

In 2013, the album was listed at number 8 on Ballast's list of top 50 Canadian albums of all time. The album was also included in the book 1001 Albums You Must Hear Before You Die. In 1998, The Wire included Oar in their list of "100 Records That Set the World on Fire (While No One Was Listening)". The staff described the "brilliant" album as "a progenitor of both the loner/stoner and lo-fi movements", further adding: "Recorded on three track(!), absolutely solo, Oar represents a type of internalized psychedelic exploration that would not find a real audience for decades." CBS News write that despite the album's initial poor sales, leading to it being deleted, it "was later hailed as one of the greatest outsider albums ever released on a major label."

== Track listing ==
All tracks composed by Alexander "Skip" Spence

1. "Little Hands" – 3:44
2. "Cripple Creek" – 2:16
3. "Diana" – 3:32
4. "Margaret/Tiger Rug" – 2:17
5. "Weighted Down (The Prison Song)" – 6:27
6. "War in Peace" – 4:05
7. "Broken Heart" – 3:29
8. "All Come to Meet Her" – 2:04
9. "Books of Moses" – 2:42
10. "Dixie Peach Promenade (Yin for Yang)" – 2:53
11. "Lawrence of Euphoria" – 1:31
12. "Grey/Afro" – 9:38

Extra Oar (1999 CD reissue bonus tracks)

1. "This Time He Has Come" – 4:42
2. "It's the Best Thing for You" – 2:48
3. "Keep Everything Under Your Hat" – 3:06
4. "Furry Heroine (Halo of Gold)" – 3:35
5. "Givin' Up Things" – 0:59

Unissued Oar

1. "If I'm Good" – 0:47
2. "You Know" – 1:47
3. "Doodle" – 1:02
4. "Fountain" – 0:34
5. "I Think You and I" – 1:14

Or (2018 AndOarAgain CD2 reissue tracks)

1. "Little Hands (Take 2)" - 3:40
2. "Cripple Creek (Basic)" - 2:16
3. "Diana (Take 3)" - 4:36
4. "Furry Heroine (Halo Of Gold) (Alternate)" - 3:26
5. "My Friend" - 2:49
6. "War In Peace (Alternate)" - 3:46
7. "Broken Heart (Voc & Acoustic)" - 4:44
8. "All Come To Meet Her (Alternate 1)" - 2:14
9. "I Want A Rock & Roll Band" - 3:10
10. "Dixie Peach Promenade (Yin For Yang) (Alternate)" - 2:06
11. "Lawrence Of Euphoria (Alternate)" - 2:01
12. "Mary Jane / Steamboat" - 4:59
13. "I Got A Lot To Say (Version 1)" - 1:50
14. "Diana (Alternate 1)" - 2:38
15. "War In Peace (Instrumental)" - 3:27
16. "Diana (Alternate 2)" - 5:55

More (2018 AndOarAgain CD3 reissue tracks)

1. "Little Hands (Vocal Overdub)" - 3:47
2. "Diana (Version 2)" - 1:10
3. "Weighted Down (The Prison Song) (Rehearsal)" - 1:11
4. "The Shape You're In" - 0:54
5. "I Want A Rock & Roll Band (Instrumental)" - 1:47
6. "It's A Hard Life (Version 1)" - 0:32
7. "I Got Something For You" - 2:00
8. "Diana (12 String Version)" - 3:58
9. "I Got A Lot To Say (Version 2)" - 0:49
10. "It Ain't Nice (Version 1)" - 1:16
11. "She Don't Care" - 0:55
12. "All Come To Meet Her (Alternate 2)" - 2:13
13. "It Ain't Nice (Version 2)" - 1:04
14. "It's A Hard Life (Version 2)" - 0:38
15. "All Come To Meet Her (Rehearsal)" - 2:59
16. "Diana (Overdub)" 4:01
17. "War In Peace (Take 2)" - 4:16
18. "Broken Heart (Extended Master)" - 4:36
19. "War In Peace (Guitar Overdub)" - 4:45
20. "Diana (Basics)" - 3:42

I Want A Rock & Roll Band (2019 Record Store Day 7" tracks)

1. "I Want A Rock & Roll Band" - 3:27
2. "I Got A Lot To Say / Mary Jane" - 2:02

== Personnel ==
- Alexander "Skip" Spence – vocals, acoustic guitar, electric guitar, bass guitar, drums

Technical

- Charlie Bradley, Don Meehan, Mike Figlio – engineer
- David Rubinson, Don Meehan – mixing
