= The Frantics (instrumental band) =

1950s-60s American rock and roll group

The Frantics or The Four Frantics were an American rock and roll group based in Seattle, Washington in the 1950s and 1960s. They signed to Dolton Records in 1959 and had several songs on the Billboard Hot 100.

== History ==
The group began as a duo called the Hi-Fis, with Ron Peterson on guitar and Chuck Schoning on saxophone. After recruiting a bassist and a drummer, they were known as the Four Frantics. Members that passed through the band in addition to Peterson and Schoning during their time were Denise Kaufman, Don Fulton, Eddie Lowell Goodman, Jim Manolides and three members of Moby Grape — Jerry Miller, Don Stevenson and Bob Mosley.

Manolides (born on March 19, 1940, in Seattle) died on May 9, 2016, aged 76. He had suffered a stroke three weeks earlier. Miller (born on July 10, 1943, in Tacoma) died on July 20, 2024, at the age of 81.
