= Land of the Sun =

Land of the Sun may refer to:

- Land of the Sun (Middle-earth), an area of Arda, in J. R. R. Tolkien's Middle-earth legendarium
- Land of the Sun (album), an album by American jazz musician Charlie Haden
- "Land of the Sun" (song), a song by Alexander "Skip" Spence
