= Fine Wine =

Fine Wine may refer to:

- Fine wine
- Fine Wine (Fine Wine album), a 1976 album by a group of the same name
- Fine Wine (Bill Anderson album), a 1998 album by Bill Anderson
- Fine Wine (film), a 2021 Nigerian romantic comedy film
- The World of Fine Wine, a quarterly publication for wine enthusiasts and collectors
- "Fine Wine", song by Kylie Minogue from the album Disco (2020)
