= Land of the Sun (song) =

Single by Skip Spence
- B-side: "All My Life (I Love You)"
- Released: 1999
- Recorded: 1996
- Genre: Rock, psychedelic rock
- Label: Sundazed
- Songwriter: Skip Spence

Land of The Sun is one of the last recordings, if not the last known recording by Alexander "Skip" Spence, a founding member of Moby Grape, whose promising career was largely finished by the mid-1970s, due to schizophrenia, compounded with drug addiction and alcoholism. Spence died of lung cancer in 1999, at the age of 52, after many years of transient accommodation, third party care and homelessness.

== History ==
The song, recorded in 1996, was originally released in 1999 by Sundazed Music as a 7-inch vinyl single, along with another rare Spence recording from 1972, "All My Life (I Love You)".

The song is noteworthy as an illustration of Spence's attempts to overcome his significant obstacles in the later years of his life. The song was commissioned for inclusion in the spinoff soundtrack to the X-Files, Songs in the Key of X, but were not used.

The song is included as a hidden track on More Oar: A Tribute to the Skip Spence Album, being a tribute album by Beck, Tom Waits, Mudhoney and others to Spence's only solo album, Oar, released in 1969. As described by Raoul Hernandez, "(i)t's Spence himself, who died at the age of 52...who saves the back end of More Oar with the mumbled, spacey, bongo madness of "Land of the Sun." A hidden bonus track deemed unworthy of 1996's X-Files spinoff, Songs in the Key of X, "Land of the Sun" brings More Oar full circle...(to) bookend an obscure chapter of rock & roll history that is finally becoming public record."
