= Wow/Grape Jam =

- Cover art for Wow

Studio album by Moby Grape
- Released: April 3, 1968
- Recorded: August 30, 1967 – February 5, 1968 (Wow); January 16 – February 13, 1968 (Grape Jam)
- Genre: Psychedelic rock; folk rock; blues rock; jam band
- Length: 38:23 (Wow) LP, 37:31 (Grape Jam) LP
- Label: Columbia LP; CS 9613 (Wow); MGS 1 (Grape Jam); Sundazed CD
- Producer: David Rubinson

Moby Grape chronology
Moby Grape (1967)	Wow/Grape Jam (1968)	Moby Grape '69 (1969)

Alternative cover
- Cover art for Grape Jam.

Wow/Grape Jam is the second album by the rock band Moby Grape. It was first released in April 1968. It is different from most double album releases in that it was released as two different albums in separate covers, but packaged together and sold for only one dollar more than price of a single LP.

This was Moby Grape's highest charting release in the U.S., peaking at #20 on the Billboard 200 album chart.

Wow had a color gatefold sleeve, while Grape Jam had a color non-gatefold sleeve. Early copies of Wow omit the band's name from the record label, for unknown reasons.

Original US copies of the two-album package had a large blue sticker on the front of shrink wrap which identified the albums and showed the songs of Wow in the correct order. The song titles for Grape Jam were only shown on the back of that album and were not visible on the outside of the sealed package. The back cover of Wow also showed the song titles in an incorrect order, and again, this was not visible on the sealed package.

Guitarist Mike Bloomfield and keyboardist Al Kooper recorded on several songs on the album, most notably, "Never", which has been cited as a source for the Led Zeppelin song "Since I've Been Loving You".

== The albums ==
Wow has a more heavily produced sound than the first Moby Grape album. String and horn arrangements were added to many of the songs by producer David Rubinson. Recording started in Los Angeles in late 1967, but most of the album was recorded in New York City in late 1967 and early 1968.

"Murder in My Heart for the Judge" is a blues rock tune written by drummer Don Stevenson that was later recorded by other rock musicians such as Lee Michaels, Three Dog Night and Chrissie Hynde. "Bitter Wind", written and sung by Bob Mosley, has remained one of the group's most popular songs. The acoustic version here contains an ending that includes harsh wind noises and backward vocals. Other stand-out tracks include Jerry Miller's rocking shuffle "Can't Be So Bad", Skip Spence's darkly comedic roots rocker "Motorcycle Irene" and Peter Lewis's lush ballad "He". The album also includes an electrified re-arranged version of "Naked, If I Want To", which was on the first album as an acoustic track. "Just Like Gene Autry: A Foxtrot" is the most unusual song on the album, a 1930s-style tune written and sung by Spence. It was given a spoken introduction from Arthur Godfrey and cut onto the LP at 78 RPM with added scratchy sound effects to give it an authentic period effect.

Grape Jam has been criticized for its rather loose and mostly improvised performances, which contrast sharply with the heavily produced material on Wow. However, Grape Jam is also notable in that it features guest appearances on piano by Al Kooper and Mike Bloomfield. This studio album was recorded in New York City in January and February 1968. Skip Spence plays guitar on "Never" and piano on "Boysenberry Jam". Peter Lewis does not appear on this album. "The Lake" is a strange combination of poetry submitted by a fan (Michael Hayworth, the winner of a KFRC San Francisco songwriting contest) and avant-garde psychedelic Musique concrète sound effects somewhat like side four of Freak Out! or "Revolution 9". The opening track "Never" is the best known song and has often been cited as the source for Led Zeppelin's song "Since I've Been Loving You", the opening lyrics, bluesy arrangement and some melodic elements are virtually identical. The album was the inspiration for a number of other studio "jam" albums during the late 1960s and early 1970s. Later examples of this trend included Al Kooper's Super Session and the third LP of George Harrison's All Things Must Pass.

== Critical reception ==
Professional ratings
Review scores
Source	Rating
Allmusic	4/5 stars
Robert Christgau	B+
Rolling Stone (1968)	negative
Rolling Stone (2007)	(Wow) (Grape Jam)

In a retrospective review for Rolling Stone magazine, music critic Robert Christgau felt that the album suffered from "Pepper-itis" because of how worthy songs such as "Can't Be So Bad" and "Murder in My Heart for the Judge" were diminished by superfluous effects such as horns, strings, stereo separations, and musique concrète. Christgau went further on Grape Jam, referring to it as "hippie self-indulgence" and "wooden groove instrumentals". Rob Hughes of Louder Sound, meanwhile, has referred to Wow as "a disjointed affair," but "hardly a disaster," highlighting "Bitter Wind," the "creepily-hypnotic Rose Colored Eyes," the "funked-up Murder In My Heart For The Judge" and "Spence’s clap of dirty thunder, Motorcycle Irene" as "classic Grape". A retrospective review of Wow by Mark Deming of AllMusic is mostly positive, arguing that it is "a far more ambitious album" than the band’s debut, that it "has plenty of strengths despite the excess gingerbread" and that while it lacks the "rev-it-up spirit" of the debut, the "guitar work is just as impressive and richly layered, and the group's harmonies and songwriting chops are still in solid shape." Deming praises the "tough, funky blues" of "Murder in My Heart for the Judge" and the "horn-driven boogie" of "Can't Be So Bad" and refers to "Bitter Wind", "He," and "Rose Colored Eyes" as "lovely folk-rock tunes with shimmering harmonies." His colleague, Matthew Greenwald, calls "Bitter Wind" "a beautifully written ballad" and "one of Bob Mosley's finest early period compositions", also praising the songs "He", "Rose Colored Eyes" and "Miller’s Blues" and calling "Murder In My Heart For The Judge" “a fabulously hilarious story of being dressed down in a court by a judge while paying parking tickets.”

== CD editions ==
The first CD of Wow/Grape Jam was a single-disc edition on the San Francisco Sound label, owned by Moby Grape's former manager Matthew Katz. It has edited versions of "Bitter Wind" and "Marmalade," while also omitting "Just Like Gene Autry: A Foxtrot" and "The Lake" entirely. This edition has been criticized for its mediocre sound quality and poor packaging. The group has never been properly compensated for this CD release.

Many of the songs from Wow also appear on the two-CD collection Vintage: The Very Best of Moby Grape released in 1993. This collection includes "Foxtrot" and the complete acoustic version of "Bitter Wind". It also includes a few Wow out-takes, notably an alternate earlier version of "Bitter Wind" in a completely different rock arrangement.

The complete version of Wow was first released on CD in Japan in 1997. A newly remastered version was released by Sundazed Music on October 9, 2007 featuring a number of bonus tracks, most of which were previously unreleased. At the same time Sundazed also released separately the CD debut of Grape Jam in its entirety, with three previously unreleased bonus tracks.

Both Wow and Grape Jam were taken out of print on November 3, 2007, along with Moby Grape for reasons that were not officially specified. It has been widely circulated on the Moby Grape mailing list that Katz, whom the band has been in legal battles with since the late 1960s, threatened to file a lawsuit against Sundazed claiming ownership of the albums' artwork.

== Artwork ==
Artwork of the Wow album (design and illustration) was done by Bob Cato. Cato proposed a surreal image without any input from the band. Cato was influenced by various Victorian woodcuts. According to Peter Lewis the title was left off the cover because "What was in the box was more important than the box." It was nominated for the Grammy Award for Best Recording Package in 1969.

== Track listing Wow ==
=== Side one ===
1. "The Place and the Time" (Miller, Stevenson) - 2:07
2. "Murder in My Heart for the Judge" (Stevenson) - 2:58
3. "Bitter Wind" (Mosley) - 3:09
4. "Can't Be So Bad" (Miller, Stevenson) - 3:41
  Complete LP and CD versions of the album conclude with a brief, spoken message from David Rubinson reminding the listener to change the turntable speed to 78 RPM for the next track.
5. "Just Like Gene Autry: A Foxtrot" (Spence) - 3:05
  This track is featured on a separate band of the LP, cut at 78 RPM. It includes a guest appearance by Arthur Godfrey, who reads the introduction and plays ukulele.

=== Side two ===
1. "He" (Lewis) - 3:36
2. "Motorcycle Irene" (Spence) - 2:24
3. "Three-Four" (Mosley) - 5:01
4. "Funky-Tunk" (Spence) - 2:11
5. "Rose Colored Eyes" (Mosley) - 4:00
6. "Miller's Blues" (Miller, Mosley) - 5:22
7. "Naked, If I Want To" (Miller) - 0:52

=== Bonus tracks on 2007 CD edition ===
13. "The Place and the Time" [Alternate Take] (Miller, Stevenson) - 2:27
14. "Stop" [Demo] (Lewis) - 2:24
15. "Loosely Remembered" (Mosley) - 3:27
16. "Miller's Blues" [Alternate Take] (Miller, Mosley) - 5:23
17. "What's to Choose" (Lewis) - 2:03
18. "Seeing" (Spence) - 5:11
  - Tracks 14–18 previously unreleased

(total CD time for Wow: 59:04)

== Track listing Grape Jam ==
=== Side one ===
1. "Never" (Mosley) - 6:16
2. "Boysenberry Jam" - 6:03
3. "Black Currant Jam" - 7:11

=== Side two ===
1. "Marmalade" - 14:05
2. "The Lake" (Michael Hayworth, Moby Grape) - 4:01

=== Bonus tracks on 2007 CD edition ===
1. "Grape Jam #2" (previously unissued) - 9:24
2. "Grape Jam #9" (previously unissued) - 9:14
3. "Bags' Groove" (previously unissued) - 13:24

(total CD time for Grape Jam 69:30)

Al Kooper plays piano on "Black Currant Jam". Mike Bloomfield plays piano on "Marmalade". Michael Hayworth wrote the lyrics and sings on "The Lake".

== Personnel ==
- Peter Lewis - rhythm guitar, vocals
- Jerry Miller - lead guitar, vocals
- Bob Mosley - bass, vocals
- Skip Spence - rhythm guitar, vocals
- Don Stevenson - drums, vocals
- Lou Waxman and his orchestra - backing track for "Just Like Gene Autry: a Foxtrot".

== Charts ==
Year	Chart	Position
1968	US Billboard 200	20
