= Moby Grape Live =

Live album by Moby Grape
- Released: April 20, 2010
- Recorded: 1966, 1967 and 1969
- Genres: Psychedelic rock; folk rock
- Length: 72:32
- Label: Sundazed

Moby Grape chronology
The Place and the Time (2009)	Moby Grape Live (2010)

Professional ratings
Review scores
Source	Rating
Allmusic	4.5/5 stars
Noisey	A−

Moby Grape Live is a 2010 album, released by Sundazed Music, of previously unissued live recordings of the band Moby Grape. Included are recordings of the band in its prime in 1966 and 1967, as well as 1969 recordings, subsequent to the 1968 collapse and departure of founding member Skip Spence. A particularly notable inclusion is the band's performance at the historic Monterey International Pop Festival. According to critic Mark Deming, "While Moby Grape's studio work might offer a clearer picture of the strength of their songs, Moby Grape Live does a brilliant job of revealing what made them great as a band, and the best tracks here should prompt any serious fan of late-'60s rock to reaffirm Moby Grape's status as one of the finest acts of their time." According to another reviewer, "After the essential debut record, this is the Moby Grape record I would recommend next."

== Track listing ==
Side 1
Avalon Ballroom, San Francisco, 1967

1. "Ain't No Use" (Miller, Stevenson) - 1:32
2. "Rounder" (Spence) - 1:59
3. "Looper" (Lewis) - 2:04
4. "Bitter Wind" (Mosley) - 2:04
5. "Changes" (Miller, Stevenson) – 4:33
6. "Indifference" (Spence) - 2:45
7. "Someday" (Miller, Stevenson, Spence) - 3:16

Side 2
Monterey International Pop Festival, 1967

1. "Introduction" 1.16
2. "Indifference" (Spence) - 3:07
3. "Mr. Blues" (Bob Mosley) - 1:56
4. "Sitting By The Window" (Lewis) - 2:53
5. "Omaha" (Skip Spence) - 2:43

San Francisco, 1967

1. "Sweet Little Angel" (Lucille Bogan) - 4:46

Side 3
RNW Radio, Amsterdam, Netherlands, 1969

1. "Murder In My Heart For The Judge" (Miller, Stevenson) - 4:48
2. "I Am Not Willing" (Lewis) - 5:21
3. "Trucking Man" (Mosley) - 2:05
4. "Fall On You" (Lewis) - 2:14
5. "Omaha" (Skip Spence) - 5:55

Side 4
Avalon Ballroom, San Francisco, 1966

1. "Dark Magic" (Moby Grape) 17:15

== Compact Disc ==
The compact disc edition was released on a single CD.
