= Mister Blues =

Mister Blues may refer to:

- Wynonie Harris (1915–1969) (aka Mister Blues), an American blues shouter and rhythm and blues singer
- "Mister Blues", a song by Moby Grape from their 1967 album Moby Grape
