= The Cornells =

1960s Los Angeles band

If you are looking for the band that composed the hit song '74-'75 see The Connells

The Cornells were a 1960s Los Angeles band that played mostly surf music. Four of the five members had a parent who was a well-known celebrity.

The band appeared on the television show I've Got A Secret in 1963 with the secret "We're all the sons of Hollywood Celebrities". They played "Caravan" live on the show.

According to Richie Unterberger,"Whatever interest this L. A. surf combo generates stems from the fact that future Moby Grape guitarist Peter Lewis was a member. (...) Lewis was the only member destined to make a mark on rock history."

== Members ==
- Peter Lewis, lead guitar; is the son of Loretta Young and screenwriter Tom Lewis. He was later a member of Moby Grape, and subsequently developed a career as a solo artist, which continues to this day.
- Bob Linkletter, rhythm guitar; son of Art Linkletter
- Jim O'Keefe, saxophone; son of Dennis O'Keefe, a famous All-American footballer and 1940s and '50s movie leading man
- Charlie Correll, drums; son of Charlie Correll, who portrayed Andy on the Amos and Andy radio program
- Tom Crumplar, bass; the only member without a famous parent
