= The Ducks =

American rock band

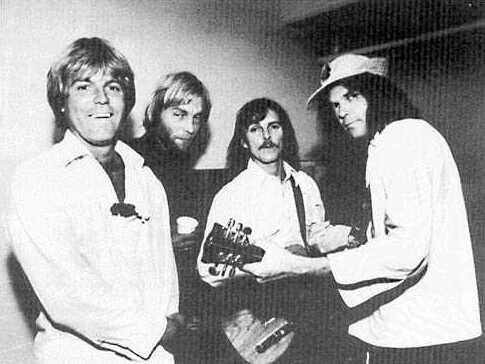
- The Ducks in 1977. From left to right: Johnny Craviotto, Bob Mosley, Jeff Blackburn, Neil Young.

Background information
- Origin: Santa Cruz County, California, U.S.
- Genres: Rock and roll, country rock, hard rock, folk rock, rock
- Years active: 1977
- Label: Bootleg
- Past members: Neil Young; Bob Mosley; Jeff Blackburn; Johnny Craviotto

The Ducks (formerly known as the Jeff Blackburn Band) were a short-lived American rock group formed in the summer of 1977 by singer-songwriter Jeff Blackburn. The band included Bob Mosley (an original member of Moby Grape), Canadian singer-songwriter Neil Young, and Johnny Craviotto. The band played a series of impromptu bar gigs around the Santa Cruz area in 1977.

== History ==
In the spring of 1977, former Moby Grape vocalist and guitarist Jerry Miller was working with various musicians, and Young found his way on stage one night with Miller (whom he knew from his Fillmore days) and a singer-songwriter named Jeff Blackburn (who co-wrote "My My, Hey Hey (Out of the Blue)"). Young began hanging out and jamming with Blackburn in the days that followed with Blackburn on rhythm guitar, Bob Mosley on bass, and session musician Johnny Craviotto on drums, who had been the drummer for Moby Grape when they reformed in 1974, along with Blackburn from the same reformation.. Craviotto had previously played on tracks for Arlo Guthrie, Ry Cooder, and Buffy Sainte-Marie and would go on to found The Craviotto Drum Company. They decided to call themselves the Ducks, and within weeks every duck call within miles had been purchased.

The local entertainment tabloid got wind that something was up and had a conversation with the group. They announced that they were forming a band called the Ducks, which would play local clubs for cover charges of less than $3. Further, Young was moving to Santa Cruz and would stay "as long as it remains cool." This exchange was later written up as a front-page story in a local newspaper. Young also said they could play "Mr. Soul" better than Buffalo Springfield. By mid-June the Ducks began to play, normally two sets a night, three or four times a week. Sometimes there was enough heads-up that they would be listed in Santa Cruz County's weekly newspaper The Good Times. The Ducks had become a local sensation.

The set lists for their shows were very democratic. All four could sing and had material, so they took turns throughout the sets in a strict manner. Highlights included "Mr. Soul," a Blackburn tune entitled "Silver Wings," a soul/R&B tune of Mosley's entitled "Gypsy Wedding," and hard Chuck Berry-esque rock and roll sessions sung by Johnny Craviotto. "Comes a Time" was played as a country rocker before turning up in its country-folk studio authenticity. They also did "Homegrown," a cover of Ian and Sylvia's "Four Strong Winds" with Young singing lead, and an instrumental guitar showcase entitled "Windward Passage." Early in the summer "Windward Passage" was done in a kind of psychedelic/surf manner, but it grew into a more traditional Young guitar piece as the weeks went on. Young played his "Old Black" guitar. In the smaller clubs the band would shake hands with the crowd at the end. Even in larger venues like The Catalyst, which had a maximum capacity of 1,000 people, people would often bump into Young and company waiting in line at the bar between sets. Young was spending money that summer on the band, and by midsummer they were doing exceptional projections of animations overhead and large mobile recording vans were usually spotted in the alley during most shows.

They played venues all over the Santa Cruz area, including the Catalyst, Crossroads, and the Veteran's Hall. Near the end of the summer they played two larger shows, one at the Civic Auditorium with the then current edition of Moby Grape, which turned out to be their final performance with Young, and an outdoor performance at Cabrillo Community College opening for Elvin Bishop.

More than 45 years later, in April 2023, Young officially released a double album culled from the band's performances at multiple venues as well as from sessions at a local recording studio. The double album was part of the Neil Young Archives project, positioned within the Official Bootleg Series, and titled High Flyin'.

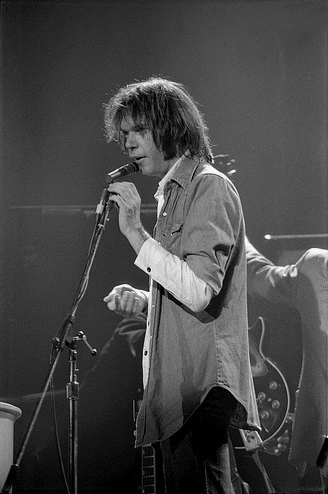
Neil Young in Austin, Texas on November 9, 1976

== Breakup ==
Young had a contract with Crazy Horse that specified he could only tour with them, and so the Ducks were required to confine themselves within the city limits so as not to tour. One interesting moment came when Crosby & Nash came into town for a concert, and Young took the stage with them.

The Ducks managed to end a mere seven weeks after they began. Young's rented house was burglarized and he lost a number of instruments and other items of great sentimental value. As word had spread in the national media about Young joining a local group, crowds increased with out of town "Duck Hunters" less content to let the band have its own identity and more inclined to yell for old perennial Neil Young concert favorites. The Ducks continued on for a while without Young and held out hope that he might return, but it did not come to pass.

The Ducks played a total of 22 shows and 178 performances. Their longest show featured 28 songs, which took place at the Crossroads Club in Santa Cruz, California. Their shortest, at Santa Cruz's Civic Auditorium, featured 18 songs.

== The Ducks at The Catalyst, Santa Cruz, California August 22, 1977 ==
Part One

- "A Deeper Mystery"
- "Gypsy Wedding" (Moby Grape)
- "Sail Away"
- "Slow Down"
- "Helplessly Hoping" (Crosby, Stills & Nash)
- "Take Me Down Behind the Sun"
- "Only Loving You"
- "Cryin' Eyes" (Neil Young)
- "Bye Bye Johnny" (Chuck Berry)
- "Your Time Will Come Around"
- "Do Me Right"
- "Are You Ready for the Country?" (Neil Young)
- "Silver Wings" (Jeff Blackburn)

Part Two

- "Two Riders"
- "Your Love"
- "Gone Dead Train" (Crazy Horse)
- "Mr. Soul" (Buffalo Springfield)
- "Hold on Boys"
- "My, My, My"
- "I'm Ready" (Fats Domino)
- "Comes a Time" (Neil Young)
- "Windward Passage"
- "Younger Days"

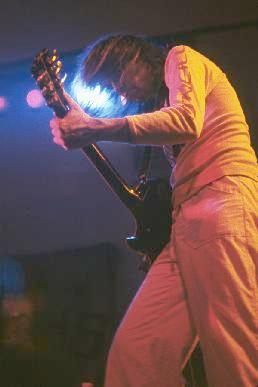
Neil Young at The Catalyst, Santa Cruz, 1977

== Gigs of 1977 ==
Dates and VenuesAll venues located in Santa Cruz, California
(July 1977)	7-09 – The Back Room at The New Riverside; 7–15 – Crossroads Club; 7–16 – Crossroads Club; 7–22 – The Back Room at The New Riverside; 7–23 – The Back Room at The New Riverside
(August 1977)	8-01 – The Steamship; 8-02 – Crossroads Club; 8-03 – The Catalyst; 8-05 – Crossroads Club; 8-06 – Veterans Auditorium; 8–11 – The Catalyst; 8–12 – Civic Auditorium; 8–22 – The Catalyst; 8–23 – The Catalyst; 8–24 – Crossroads Club; 8–25 – The Catalyst; 8–27 – The Catalyst; 8–30 – The Catalyst
(September 1977)	9-01 – Civic Auditorium; 9-02 – Civic Auditorium

== See also ==
- Music of California
- Neil Young
- Jerry Miller
- Moby Grape
- Crazy Horse
