= Moby Grape '69 =

Studio album by Moby Grape
- Released: January 30, 1969
- Recorded: April 22–November 24, 1968
- Genre: Psychedelic rock; country rock; folk rock
- Length: 29:17
- Label: Columbia
- Producer: David Rubinson

Moby Grape chronology
Wow/Grape Jam (1968)	Moby Grape '69 (1969)	Truly Fine Citizen (1969)

Professional ratings
Review scores
Source	Rating
AllMusic	3.5/5 stars
Robert Christgau	3/5 stars
Rolling Stone	(positive)

Moby Grape '69 is the third album by the psychedelic rock band Moby Grape, released on January 30, 1969.

It is the first album after the departure of co-founder Skip Spence. Spence nonetheless is heard on one song, "Seeing", presumably from the Wow/Grape Jam sessions, and positioned as the final song on Moby Grape '69. As Peter Lewis describes the album, "We made Moby Grape '69, in an attempt to rebound from the Wow album, which was over-produced. And it's a cool album. Although we could have rehearsed it a little more, we still believed in it. But I think we were waiting for Skippy to come back, and he never did".

The album peaked at number 113 on the Billboard chart. Nevertheless, it is noteworthy as an early endeavor into country rock.

The album was re-released on CD and Vinyl in 2007 by Sundazed, but as with their previous albums, it has been pulled.

== Track listing ==
=== Side one ===
1. "Ooh Mama Ooh" (Jerry Miller, Don Stevenson) – 2:26
2. "Ain't That a Shame" (Jerry Miller, Don Stevenson, Peter Lewis) – 2:28
3. "I Am Not Willing" (Peter Lewis) – 2:58
4. "It's a Beautiful Day Today" (Bob Mosley) – 3:06
5. "Hoochie" (Bob Mosley) – 4:21

=== Side two ===
1. "Trucking Man" (Bob Mosley) – 2:00
2. "If You Can't Learn from My Mistakes" (Peter Lewis) – 2:33
3. "Captain Nemo" (Jerry Miller, Don Stevenson) – 1:43
4. "What's to Choose" (Peter Lewis) – 1:57
5. "Going Nowhere" (Jerry Miller, Don Stevenson) – 2:01
6. "Seeing" (Skip Spence) – 3:44

=== Bonus tracks on 2007 CD edition ===
1. "Soul Stew" (Bob Mosley) – 2:16
2. "If You Can't Learn from My Mistakes" [Demo] (Peter Lewis) – 1:23
3. "You Can Do Anything" [Demo] (Skip Spence) – 3:35
4. "It's a Beautiful Day Today" [Demo] (Bob Mosley) – 4:12
  - Previously unreleased
5. "What's to Choose" [Demo] (Peter Lewis) – 3:19
  - Previously unreleased
6. "Big" [Demo] (Jerry Miller, Don Stevenson) – 2:19
7. "Hoochie" [Demo] (Bob Mosley) – 3:18
  - Previously unreleased

== Personnel ==
- Peter Lewis - rhythm guitar, vocals
- Jerry Miller - lead guitar, vocals
- Bob Mosley - bass, vocals
- Don Stevenson - drums, vocals
- Skip Spence - vocals and unknown instruments (on "Seeing")

== Charts ==
Album - Billboard

Year	Chart	Position
1969	Pop Albums	113
