= 20 Granite Creek =

Studio album by Moby Grape
- Released: September 1971
- Recorded: 1971
- Studio: Pacific, San Mateo; Moby Grape's House
- Genre: Folk rock; country rock
- Length: 32:53
- Label: Reprise
- Producer: David Rubinson, Moby Grape Productions

Moby Grape chronology
Truly Fine Citizen (1969)	20 Granite Creek (1971)	Great Grape (1972)

20 Granite Creek is the rock band Moby Grape's fifth album. After recording their last album for Columbia Records, Truly Fine Citizen, the band went on hiatus until 1971 when they reunited with Skip Spence and Bob Mosley and recorded this reunion album for Reprise Records; their only album for the label. David Rubinson, who produced most of the band's Columbia albums, was back as producer here, as well as serving as the band's manager.. The album title refers to an address near Santa Cruz, CA but there is no record that any band member ever lived there. The rights to this album are now owned by the band after previous manager, Matthew Katz, lost them when the band successfully sued him in 2007.

== Critical reception ==
Retrospective professional reviews
Review scores
Source	Rating
AllMusic	4.5/5 stars
Christgau's Record Guide	B+

Reviewing for Rolling Stone in 1971, music critic Richard Meltzer found the album remarkable and said that it "proves that without an audience and with all the members of the original Grape aboard ship they can outdo Truly Fine Citizen with their eyes closed." By contrast, Robert Christgau of The Village Voice found it drab and marred by kotos, but warmed to the album over time; in Christgau's Record Guide: Rock Albums of the Seventies (1981), he said Moby Grape sounds intense and hopeful for a band in decline: "You can hear the country undertone now, but you can also hear why you missed it—at their most lyrical these guys never lay back, and lyricism is something they're usually rocking too hard to bother with, though their compact forms guarantee poetic justice."

== Track listing ==
Side one

1. "Gypsy Wedding" (Bob Mosley) – 2:30
2. "I'm the Kind of Man That Baby You Can Trust" (Jerry Miller) – 2:38
3. "About Time" (Don Stevenson) – 2:52
4. "Goin' Down to Texas" (Peter Lewis) – 2:00
5. "Road to the Sun" (Mosley) – 2:48
6. "Apocalypse" (Lewis) – 2:11

Side two

7. "Chinese Song" (Spence) – 5:42
8. "Roundhouse Blues" (Miller) – 2:45
9. "Ode to the Man at the End of the Bar" (Carl Andrew Tyler Mosley) – 3:43
10. "Wild Oats Moan" (Miller, Stevenson) – 3:12
11. "Horse Out in the Rain" (Lewis) – 2:20

== Personnel ==
- Peter Lewis - rhythm guitar, vocals
- Jerry Miller - lead guitar, vocals
- Bob Mosley - bass; drums (track #9); vocals
- Skip Spence - rhythm guitar; koto; vocals
- Don Stevenson - drums; electric guitar (#3); vocals
- Gordon Stevens - electric viola, dobro, mandolin

Additional personnel

- Jeffrey Cohen - bass (#9)
- Andy Narell - steel drums
- David Rubinson - electric piano, congas

== Charts ==
Album – Billboard

Year	Chart	Position
1971	Pop Albums	177
