= Skip Spence =

Canadian-American musician (1946–1999)

Alexander "Skip" Spence
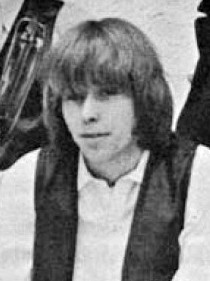
- Spence in 1966

Background information
- Born: Alexander Lee Spence, Jr. April 18, 1946; Windsor, Ontario, Canada
- Origin: San Francisco, California, U.S.
- Died: April 16, 1999 (aged 52) Santa Cruz, California, U.S.
- Genres: Psychedelic rock; folk rock; psychedelic folk
- Occupations: Singer; songwriter; musician
- Instruments: Vocals; guitar; drums
- Years active: 1965–1971, sporadically until 1999
- Label: Columbia
- Formerly of: Moby Grape; Jefferson Airplane; Quicksilver Messenger Service; The Other Side

Alexander "Skip" Spence (born Alexander Lee Spence, Jr.; April 18, 1946 – April 16, 1999) was a Canadian singer-songwriter and musician. He was co-founder of Moby Grape, and played guitar with them until 1969. In the same year, he released his only solo album, Oar, and then largely withdrew from the music industry. He had started his career as a guitarist in an early line-up of Quicksilver Messenger Service, and was the drummer on Jefferson Airplane's debut album, Jefferson Airplane Takes Off. He has been described on the AllMusic website as "one of psychedelia's brightest lights"; however, his career was plagued by drug addiction coupled with mental health problems, and he has been described by a biographer as a man who "neither died young nor had a chance to find his way out."

== Biography ==
=== Early life: 1946–1965 ===
Alexander Lee Spence was born in Windsor, Ontario, Canada, on April 18, 1946. His father, Alexander Lett "Jock" Spence (1914–1965), was a machinist, a salesman, and played Route 66 as a solo singer-songwriter and piano player. He was also a decorated Canadian World War II bomber pilot, having been awarded the Distinguished Flying Cross.

In the late 1950s, the family relocated from Windsor to San Jose, California, when Spence's father found work in the aircraft industry. His parents gave him his first guitar when he was 10.

=== Music career: 1966–1969 ===
Spence was a guitarist in the band The Other Side before Marty Balin recruited him to be the drummer for Jefferson Airplane (apparently because he looked the part). He has been described as "a key member of the psychedelic 60s San Francisco Bay Area scene." Spence drummed on their debut, Jefferson Airplane Takes Off, which was recorded before Grace Slick joined the group. The band dismissed him after he took an unannounced vacation in Mexico. He wrote the song "My Best Friend", which was released on Jefferson Airplane's second album Surrealistic Pillow and as a single, although Spence didn't play on the song. He briefly considered joining Buffalo Springfield as a drummer before returning to the guitar to co-found Moby Grape.

During the recording session of Moby Grape's second album, Wow in 1968, Spence attempted to break down a bandmate's hotel room door with a fire axe while under the influence of LSD. Spence's deterioration in New York and the "fire axe incident" are described by bandmate Jerry Miller as follows:

Skippy changed radically when we were in New York. There were some people there that were into harder drugs and a harder lifestyle, and some very weird shit. And so he kind of flew off with those people. Skippy kind of disappeared for a little while. Next time we saw him, he had cut off his beard, and was wearing a black leather jacket, with his chest hanging out, with some chains and just sweating like a son of a gun. I don't know what the hell he got a hold of, man, but it just whacked him. And the next thing I know, he axed my door down in the Albert Hotel. (Note: Located at University Place and East 11th Street, New York City and now an apartment building, it was at the time a famous hotel originally owned by the brother of artist Albert Pinkham Ryder. The hotel was named in his honour. Robert Louis Stevenson used one of the hotel's rooms as his studio. Other famous guests included Thomas Wolfe and Patrick Bunyan) They said at the reception area that this crazy guy had held an axe to the doorman's head.

Bandmate Peter Lewis describes Don Stevenson as also being the target of Spence, and what happened to him afterwards:

We had to do [the album] in New York because the producer [David Rubinson] wanted to be with his family. So we had to leave our families and spend months at a time in hotel rooms in New York City. Finally I just quit and went back to California. I got a phone call after a couple of days. They'd played a Fillmore East gig without me, and Skippy took off with some black witch afterward who fed him full of acid. It was like that scene in The Doors movie. He thought he was the anti-Christ. He tried to chop down the hotel room door with a fire axe to kill Don [Stevenson] to save him from himself. He went up to the 52nd floor of the CBS building where they had to wrestle him to the ground. And Rubinson pressed charges against him. They took him to The Tombs [notorious prison in New York] and that's where he wrote Oar. When he got out of there, he cut that album in Nashville. And that was the end of his career. They shot him full of Thorazine for six months. They just take you out of the game.

In June 1968 Spence was admitted to Bellevue Hospital in New York; during his six-month stay he was diagnosed with schizophrenia. According to an urban myth, on the day of his release, clad in pajamas he drove a motorcycle directly to Nashville to record his only solo album, with the help of no other musicians, the now-classic psychedelic/folk album Oar (1969, Columbia Records). (Note: This commonly accepted version of events has recently been challenged as being mythical. It is asserted, without citation, that Spence first returned to his wife and family in Santa Cruz and that his family accompanied him to Nashville; see Moby Grape.)

=== Decline: 1970–1999 ===
During the early 1970s Spence also founded and experimented with a three-man rock band called Pachuca and later a larger ensemble called The Rhythm Dukes. He continued to have minor involvement in later Moby Grape projects and reunions. He contributed to 20 Granite Creek (1971) and Live Grape (1978), though his bandmates always included at least one of his songs on group recordings, irrespective of whether he was capable of performing with the group at the time. He had been similarly remembered by Jefferson Airplane, whereby his song "My Best Friend" was included on the group's Surrealistic Pillow album (1967), despite his departure from the group.

Due to his deteriorating state and notwithstanding that he was no longer functioning in the band, Spence was supported by Moby Grape band members for extended periods. Voluminous consumption of heroin and cocaine resulted in a further involuntary committal for Spence. As described by Peter Lewis, "Skippy was just hanging around. He hadn't been all there for years, because he'd been into heroin all that time. In fact he actually OD'ed once and they had him in the morgue in San Jose with a tag on his toe. All of a sudden he got up and asked for a glass of water. Now he was snortin' big clumps of coke, and nothing would happen to him. We couldn't have him around because he'd be pacing the room, describing axe murders. So we got him a little place of his own. He had a little white rat named Oswald that would snort coke too. He'd never washed his dishes, and he'd try to get these little grammar school girls to go into the house with him. He was real bad. One of the parents finally called the cops, and they took him to the County Mental Health Hospital in Santa Cruz. Where they immediately lost him, and he turned up days later in the women's ward."

Mental illness, drug addiction, and alcoholism thus prevented Spence from sustaining a career in the music industry. He spent many of his years in third-party care, as a ward of the State of California, and either homeless or in transient accommodations in his later years. He remained in and around San Jose and Santa Cruz. Peter Lewis regularly visited Spence during the latter years of his life: "The last five years I'd go up‚ he lived in a trailer up there‚ Capitola. I used to hang around with him; we'd spend the weekends together. But he just basically kind of hit the...he was helpless in a way in terms of being able to define anything or control his feelings."

In 1994, he participated in a music program for the mentally ill, sponsored by the City of San Jose. Two years later, in 1996, he was commissioned to write a song for The X-Files soundtrack, Songs in the Key of X; it wasn't used, but it was included on the More Oar tribute record as "Land of the Sun".

Spence's final performance with Moby Grape occurred on August 9, 1996, at Palookaville in Santa Cruz. At this final show, Spence led the group through a rendition of "Sailing" (a song performed during the 1971 reunion run) and an impromptu performance of "J.P.P. McStep B. Blues", which he'd written for Jefferson Airplane in 1966.

=== Death ===
Spence died of lung cancer on April 16, 1999, two days short of his 53rd birthday. He was survived by his four children, eleven grandchildren, half-brother Rich Young, and sister Sherry Ferreira. More Oar: A Tribute to the Skip Spence Album, an album featuring contributions from Robert Plant, Tom Waits, and Beck, among others, was released a few weeks after his death. Prior to its release, the CD was played for Spence at the hospital, in his final stages before death. Spence is interred at Soquel Cemetery in Santa Cruz County.

== Legacy ==
Spence has been described on the Allmusic website as "one of psychedelia's brightest lights". Spence wrote "Omaha" for Moby Grape's first album which Rolling Stone listed in 2008 as one of the 100 greatest guitar songs of all time.

In June 2008, a Skip Spence tribute concert was held in Santa Cruz. The concert featured Spence's son Omar, who has sung with various configurations of Moby Grape in recent years. Omar Spence, singing his father's songs, was backed by the Santa Cruz White Album Ensemble, with Dale Ockerman and Tiran Porter, both formerly of the Doobie Brothers, and both of whom have played with various members of Moby Grape in several bands over the past three decades. Don Stevenson (an original Moby Grape member) also performed. Keith Graves of Quicksilver Messenger Service played drums.

Peter Lewis joined the group onstage for the finale. An additional Skip Spence tribute concert was held in October 2008.

William Gibson paid tribute to Spence in his collection of essays, Distrust That Particular Flavor, in which he marvelled at his tailor-adjusted jeans.

In April 2024, a new biography about Spence's life, by Cam Cobb and Robin Spence, was published, titled Weighted Down: The Complicated Life of Skip Spence.

In June 2024, multiple artists of the San Francisco psychedelic and alternative rock scenes paid tribute to Spence with a tribute concert.

== Discography ==
=== With Jefferson Airplane ===
- Jefferson Airplane Takes Off (RCA, 1966)

Compilations

- Early Flight (RCA, 1974)
- Jefferson Airplane Loves You (RCA, 1992)

=== With Moby Grape ===
Original albums

- Moby Grape (Columbia, 1967)
- Wow/Grape Jam (Columbia, 1968)
- Moby Grape '69 (Columbia, 1969)
- 20 Granite Creek (Reprise, 1971)
- Live Grape (Escape, 1978)
- The Place and the Time (Sundazed, 2009)
- Moby Grape Live (Sundazed, 2010)

Compilations

- Omaha (Harmony, 1971)
- Great Grape (Columbia, 1972)
- Murder in My Heart (Edsel, 1986)
- Vintage: The Very Best of Moby Grape (Columbia/Legacy, 1993)
- Crosstalk: The Best of Moby Grape (Sony International, 2004)
- Listen My Friends! The Best of Moby Grape (Columbia/Legacy, 2007)

=== Solo ===
==== Studio album ====
- Oar (Columbia, 1969), remastered and expanded in 1999 by Sundazed

==== Other release ====
- AndOarAgain (Columbia, 1969), remastered and expanded "Oar" with three discs (Modern Harmonic/Sundazed) (2018)

==== Single releases ====
- "Land of the Sun" (Sundazed, 1999)
- "After Gene Autry" b/w "Motorcycle Irene" (aka Previously Unissued Demo Recordings) (Sundazed, 2009)
- "I Want A Rock & Roll Band" b/w " I Got A Lot To Say / Mary Jane" (Modern Harmonic/Columbia, 2019)

==== Compilation appearances ====
- Psychodelia (MCI, 1994) - "War in Peace"
- Psychodelic Frequencies (Temple, 1996) - "War in Peace"
- L'odyssee Du Rock (Sony Music Media/Sony, 2004) 4XLP - "Cripple Creek"
- Meridian 1970 (Protest, Sorrow, Hobos, Folk and Blues) (Forever Heavenly/EMI, 2005) - "Cripple Creek"
- Woodstock Generation (Sony Music, 2009) MP3 - "War in Peace"
- Pure...Psychedelic Rock (Sony Music), 2010) 4XCD - "War in Peace"
- Come on Back to The War (Mississippi, 2011) cassette - "Margret Tiger Rug"
- The Anniversary of Light (Mississippi, 2013) cassette - "Weighted Down"
- Bobby Gillespie Presents Sunday Mornin' Comin' Down (Ace, 2015) - "War in Peace"
- Institute-A Mixed Tape Made By Institute (Sacred Bones, 2015) ltd. edition cassette - "Cripple Creek"
- Between the Music Vol. One (End of the Road, 2022) 2XLP - "Cripple Creek"
- Music For The Stars (Celestial Music 1960-1979) (Two Piers, 2022) 2XLP/CD - "Broken Heart"
- Who Has Seen The Wind (Mississippi) cassette - "Broken Heart"

== Tribute album ==
- More Oar: A Tribute to the Skip Spence Album (Birdman, 1999)
