= Moby Grape =

American rock band

- Columbia Records promotional photo, 1967. (Left to right) Skip Spence, Jerry Miller, Bob Mosley, Peter Lewis, Don Stevenson

Background information
- Origin: San Francisco, California, U.S.
- Genres: Rock and roll; psychedelic rock; acid rock; country rock
- Years active: 1966–1969; 1971; 1973–1975; 1977–1979; 1983–1984; 1987–1991; 1996–2001; 2006–present
- Labels: Columbia; Reprise; Polydor; Legacy; Dig Music; Sundazed; Escape Records
- Members: Peter Lewis; Bob Mosley
- Past members: Jerry Miller; Skip Spence; Don Stevenson
- Website: mobygrape.us

Moby Grape is an American rock band founded in 1966. Part of San Francisco's psychedelic music scene, the band merged elements of rock and roll, folk music, pop, blues, and country. They were one of the few groups of which all members were lead vocalists and songwriters. The group's first incarnation ended in 1969, in part due to members Bob Mosley and Skip Spence suffering from mental illness. The group has reformed many times afterwards and continues to perform occasionally.

Moby Grape's success was accompanied by decades-long legal disputes with their former manager, Matthew Katz. Legal difficulties originated shortly after the group's formation, when Katz insisted on ownership of the group name. The dispute with Katz became more acute after the group members' rights to their songs were signed away in 1973, in a settlement made without their knowledge.

As described by Jeff Tamarkin, "The Grape's saga is one of squandered potential, absurdly misguided decisions, bad luck, blunders and excruciating heartbreak, all set to the tune of some of the greatest rock and roll ever to emerge from San Francisco. Moby Grape could have had it all, but they ended up with nothing, and less."

== Career ==
=== 1966–1967 ===
The group was formed in September 1966 in San Francisco at the instigation of Skip Spence and Matthew Katz. Both had previously been associated with Jefferson Airplane, Spence as the band's first drummer, playing on their first album, Jefferson Airplane Takes Off, and Katz as the band's manager, but the group had dismissed both of them. Katz encouraged Spence to form a band similar to Jefferson Airplane, with varied songwriting and vocal work by several group members, and with Katz as the manager. According to band member Peter Lewis, "Matthew (Katz) brought the spirit of conflict into the band. He didn't want it to be an equal partnership. He wanted it all." At the time, various group members were indebted to Katz, who had been paying for apartments and various living costs prior to the release of the group's first album. Despite objecting, group members signed without seeking outside legal advice, believing in part that there would be no further financial support from Katz unless they did so. Neil Young, then of Buffalo Springfield, was in the room at the time, and kept his head down, playing his guitar, and saying nothing. According to Peter Lewis, "I think Neil knew, even then, that this was the end. We had bought into this process that we should have known better than to buy into."

The band name, chosen by Bob Mosley and Spence, came from the punch line of the joke "What's big and purple and lives in the ocean?" Lead guitarist Jerry Miller and drummer Don Stevenson (both formerly of the Frantics, originally based in Seattle) joined guitarist (and son of actress Loretta Young) Peter Lewis (of the Cornells), bassist Bob Mosley (of the Misfits, based in San Diego), and Spence, now on guitar instead of drums. Miller and Stevenson had moved the Frantics from Seattle to San Francisco after a 1965 meeting with Jerry Garcia, then playing with the Warlocks at a bar in Belmont, California. Garcia encouraged them to move to San Francisco. Once the Frantics were settled in San Francisco, Mosley joined the band.

While Miller was the principal lead guitarist, all three guitarists played lead at various points, often playing off against each other, in a guitar form associated with Moby Grape as "crosstalk". The other major three-guitar band at the time was Buffalo Springfield. Moby Grape's music has been described by Geoffrey Parr as follows: "No rock and roll group has been able to use a guitar trio as effectively as Moby Grape did on Moby Grape. Spence played a distinctive rhythm guitar that really sticks out throughout the album. Lewis, meanwhile, was a very good guitar player overall and was excellent at finger picking, as is evident in several songs. And then there is Miller. The way they crafted their parts and played together on Moby Grape is like nothing else I've ever heard in my life. The guitars are like a collage of sound that makes perfect sense."

All band members wrote songs and sang lead and backup vocals for their debut album, Moby Grape (1967). Mosley, Lewis, and Spence generally wrote alone, while Miller and Stevenson generally wrote together. In 2003, Moby Grape was ranked at number 121 in Rolling Stone's "500 Greatest Albums of All Time". Noted rock critic Robert Christgau listed it as one of the 40 "Essential Albums of 1967". In 2008, Spence's song "Omaha", from the first Moby Grape album, was listed as number 95 in Rolling Stone's "100 Greatest Guitar Songs of All Time". The song was described as follows:

On their best single, Jerry Miller, Peter Lewis and Skip Spence compete in a three-way guitar battle for two and a quarter red-hot minutes, each of them charging at Spence's song from different angles, no one yielding to anyone else."

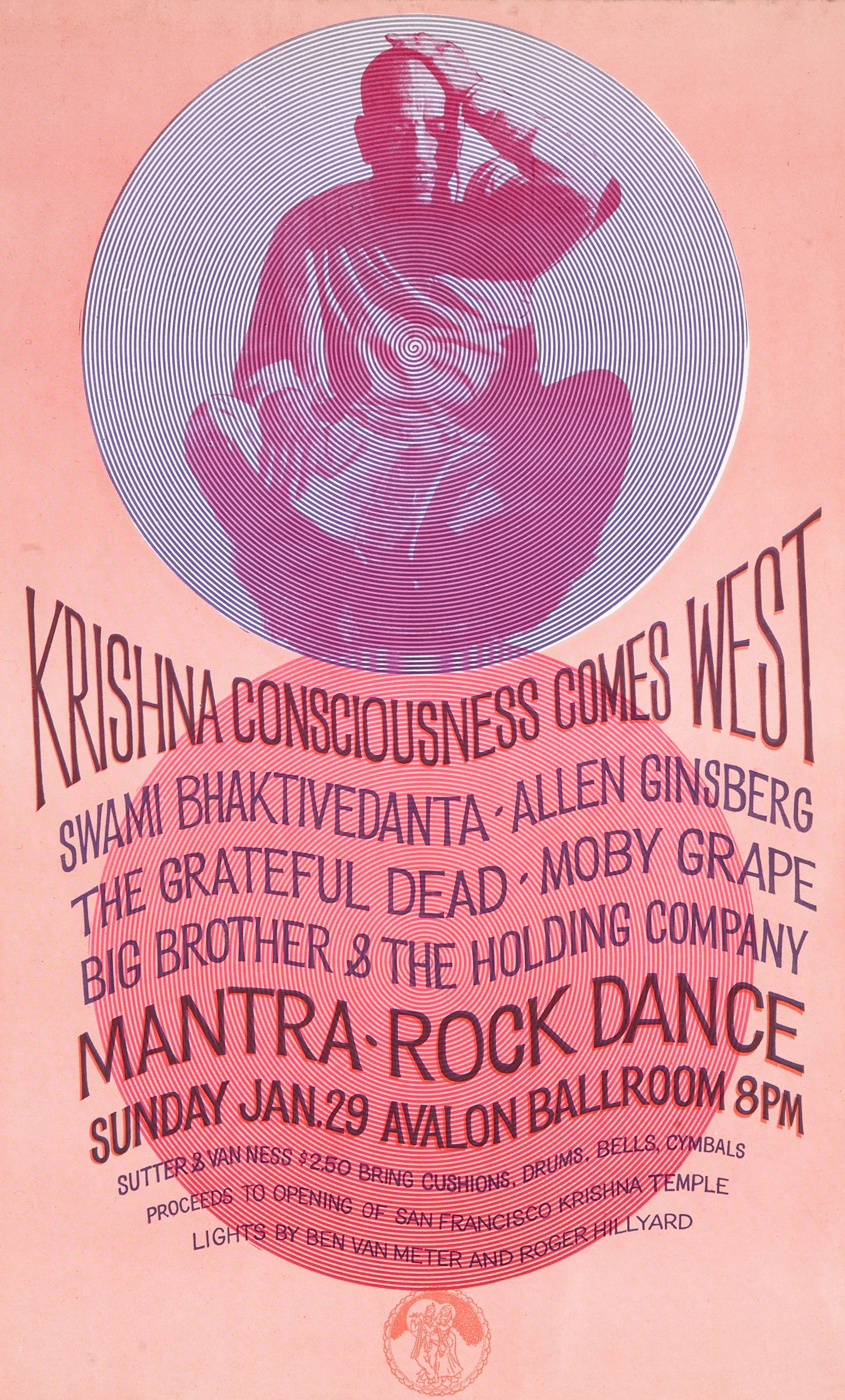
The Mantra-Rock Dance promotional poster featuring Moby Grape

In a marketing stunt, Columbia Records immediately released five singles at once, and the band was perceived as being over-hyped. This was during a period in which mainstream record labels heavily promoted what were then considered counter-cultural music genres. The record was critically acclaimed and fairly successful commercially, with The Move covering the album's "Hey Grandma" (a Miller-Stevenson composition) on their self-titled first album "Hey Grandma" was also included in the soundtrack to the 2005 Sean Penn-Nicole Kidman film, The Interpreter, as well as being covered in 2009 by the Black Crowes, on Warpaint Live. Spence's "Omaha" was the only one of the five singles to chart, reaching number 88 in the US in 1967 and number 87 in Canada. Miller-Stevenson's "8:05" became a country rock standard (covered by Robert Plant, Guy Burlage, and others).

One of Moby Grape's earliest major onstage performances was the Mantra-Rock Dance — a musical event held on January 29, 1967, at the Avalon Ballroom by the San Francisco Hare Krishna temple. At the event Moby Grape performed along with the Bhaktivedanta Swami, founder of the International Society for Krishna Consciousness, beat poet Allen Ginsberg, and fellow rock bands Grateful Dead and Big Brother and the Holding Company donating proceeds to the temple. The group appeared at the Monterey Pop Festival on June 17, 1967. Due to legal and managerial disputes, the group was not included in the D.A. Pennebaker-produced film of the event, Monterey Pop. Moby Grape's Monterey recordings and film remain unreleased, allegedly because Katz demanded one million dollars for the rights. According to Lewis, Katz "told Lou Adler they had to pay us a million bucks to film us at the Monterey Pop Festival. So instead of putting us on Saturday night right before Otis Redding, they wound up putting us on at sunset on Friday when there was nobody in the place."

The Moby Grape footage was shown in 2007 as part of the 40th anniversary celebrations of the film. Miller recalled that Laura Nyro was given Moby Grape's original position opening for Redding, "because everybody was arguing. Nobody wanted to play first and I said that would be fine for me." In addition to the marketing backlash, band members found themselves in legal trouble for charges (later dropped) of consorting with underage girls, and the band's relationship with their manager rapidly deteriorated.

=== 1968 ===
The second album, Wow/Grape Jam, released in 1968, was generally viewed as a critical and commercial disappointment, even though the album charted at No. 20 on the Billboard Pop Albums charts, partially due to the special low price double-album packaging. The album included the track "Just Like Gene Autry, a Foxtrot", a tribute to the big band era which was tracked only to be played back properly at the speed of 78 RPM. The Grape Jam LP was one of loose, improvised studio jams with outside musicians. Also in 1968, the band contributed to the soundtrack of the movie The Sweet Ride, and appeared, credited, in the film.

The band was also introduced to a wide group of UK listeners in 1968 through the inclusion of "Can't Be So Bad", from the Wow album, on the sampler album The Rock Machine Turns You On (CBS).

But, amidst this success, troubled times plagued the band when founding member Spence began abusing LSD, which led to increasingly erratic behavior. According to Miller: "Skippy changed radically when we were in New York. There were some people there (he met) who were into harder drugs and a harder lifestyle, and some very weird shit. And so he kind of flew off with those people. Skippy kind of disappeared for a little while. Next time we saw him, he had cut off his beard, and was wearing a black leather jacket, with his chest hanging out, with some chains and just sweating like a son of a gun. I don't know what the hell he got a hold of, man, but it just whacked him. And the next thing I know, he axed my door down in the Albert Hotel. They said at the reception area that this crazy guy had held an ax to the doorman's head." After spending time in the infamous Tombs jail in New York, Spence was committed to New York's Bellevue Hospital, where he spent six months under psychiatric care.

Recalling this troubled time for Spence, Lewis said, "We had to do (the album) in New York because the producer (David Rubinson) wanted to be with his family. So we had to leave our families and spend months at a time in hotel rooms in New York City. Finally I just quit and went back to California. I got a phone call after a couple of days. They'd played a Fillmore East gig without me, and Skippy took off with some black witch afterward who fed him full of acid. It was like that scene in The Doors movie. He thought he was the anti-Christ. He tried to chop down the hotel room door with a fire axe to kill Don [Stevenson] to save him from himself. He went up to the 52nd floor of the CBS building where they had to wrestle him to the ground. And Rubinson pressed charges against him. They took him to the Tombs (and then to Bellevue) and that's where he wrote Oar. When he got out of there, he cut that album in Nashville. And that was the end of his career. They shot him full of Thorazine for six months. They just take you out of the game."

=== 1969–1970 ===
After the forced departure of Spence, the remaining four members continued recording throughout 1968 and released Moby Grape '69 in January 1969. Spence's "Seeing" (also known as "Skip's Song") was finished by the foursome, and it is one of the highlights. Despite the collaborative effort to complete the song, the songwriting credit was left solely with Spence. After a tour of the UK and the Netherlands in February 1969 as a four piece, Bob Mosley left the group, shocking the remaining members by joining the Marines. The remaining three released their final album for Columbia, Truly Fine Citizen, in late 1969, with session bassist Bob Moore filling in for the departed Mosley during the sessions for the album. Truly Fine Citizen would be the final work conducted by the band prior to their initial dissolution.

Miller and Stevenson then formed The Rhythm Dukes, later joined by Bill Champlin. The band achieved a degree of success as a second-billed act during much of the latter part of 1969 to 1971, and recorded one album, not released until 2005.

=== 1970s–1980s ===
In 1971, the original five members reunited and, along with violinist Gordon Stevens, recorded 20 Granite Creek for Reprise Records. The group performed a few concerts to support the album, most notably during the last days of the Fillmore East before Spence left and the group broke up. These concerts were described by contemporary accounts as disastrous, and circulating recordings do little to challenge that assessment. These shows are noteworthy, however, due to their inclusion of original material that did not appear on their albums proper. Mosley contributed "When You're Down The Road" and "Just A Woman", Lewis "There Is No Reason", and Spence brought along a song referred to as "We Don't Know Now" (a misinterpretation of Miller on an audience recording telling them that they were "going to do Omaha now" before launching into the song) and "Sailing", a song which would be all but forgotten until Spence performed it with Moby Grape at a 1996 gig near Spence's home in Santa Cruz, California, at the Palookaville nightclub. They also performed songs cut for 20 Granite Creek. A Fillmore East gig saw Mosley doing an a capella rendition of "Ode To The Man At The End of The Bar".

Following the departure of Spence, and the band's consequent dissolution, the band reformed several times over the following years; featuring different combinations of the members. In 1973, Lewis, Miller, and Mosley reformed the band for some live shows; with guitarist Jeff Blackburn and drummer Johnny Craviotto filling the roles vacated by Spence and Stevenson. Following the end of the shows in 1975, Miller, Mosley, and Craviotto were joined by Michael Been (later of The Call), under the name Fine Wine, and recorded an LP under the same name on Polydor Records in Germany in 1976. Following the end of Fine Wine, Mosley and Craviotto joined with Jeff Blackburn and Neil Young to form The Ducks, which played in and around the Santa Cruz area during 1977, and were popular during the band's brief life; whilst Miller and Been went on to form The Original Haze, also originating around the Santa Cruz area, before joining Lewis and Spence in another reformation of Moby Grape; this time joined by keyboardist/sax Cornelius Bumpus, drummers John Oxendine and Daniel Spencer, and bassist Chris Powell. The band released 1978's Live Grape album on Escape Records before again splitting in 1979.

The 1980s saw the band reform again on two occasions; firstly in 1983 with a line-up consisting of Lewis, Miller, Mosley, and Stevenson, which released the Moby Grape '84 album before dissolving in 1984. Then, in February 1987, the full original line-up of Moby Grape, along with It's a Beautiful Day, Fraternity of Man, and the Strawberry Alarm Clock, got together for a couple of shows. They performed their debut tunes "Hey Grandma", "Naked, If I Want To", "Omaha", "Fall on You", and "8:05", among others, before fans at the Marin Civic and Cupertino's DeAnza College. Following these shows Spence departed the band (for the final time), and his role within the group was filled by Dan Abernathy for recording and touring purposes.

Due to continued legal battle between the band and Matthew Katz over ownership of the "Moby Grape" name, other names were used during this period for performance or recording purposes; including Mosley Grape, Legendary Grape, Maby Grope, the previously used Fine Wine, and The Melvilles. This led to the band's 1989 Legendary Grape album being considered by some to be a Melvilles recording, as, while it was originally issued as a Moby Grape cassette-only release, the tape eventually had to be withdrawn due to pressure from Katz's legal team; and it was subsequently repackaged and reissued as being by The Melvilles. Despite Jerry Miller, Bob Mosley and Peter Lewis continuing to release solo records in the 1990s and 2000s, Moby Grape has not released an album of new material since the release of Legendary Grape in 1989. Jerry Miller considers the 2003 remastered and supplemented CD version of Legendary Grape to be an essential Moby Grape album.

=== 1990s–2000s ===
The debut album and Wow/Grape Jam were first released on CD during the late 1980s by the San Francisco Sound label, a company owned by their former manager, Matthew Katz. These releases suffer from mediocre sound and poor quality packaging. It is also contended that Moby Grape has never been properly compensated for recordings released by this label. The double CD 1993 Legacy Recordings compilation Vintage: The Very Best of Moby Grape includes their entire first album and most of Moby Grape '69, selected tracks from Wow and Truly Fine Citizen, as well as studio outtakes and alternate versions, in much better quality. This compilation attracted new attention to the band and helped introduce their music to a new audience. In 1994, the group members commenced an action against Matthew Katz, Columbia Records and parent company Sony Music, seeking to have the settlement overturned. This settlement from 1973 meant that the group members would receive no royalties whatsoever from Vintage.

The band had folded again in 1991 due to the deteriorating emotional state of Bob Mosley; who ultimately ended up being homeless in San Diego. This led Lewis, Miller, and Stevenson to regroup with Mosley and reform the band in 1996 as a means to help him resolve his problems; with health problems preventing Skip Spence from also joining the band. Spence lived in a residential care facility in northern California, and despite an extended period of homelessness and suffering from mental illness, there was a marked improvement in his domestic life in his later years before he died from lung cancer in 1999, two days before his 53rd birthday.

=== 2000s–present ===
Amid the ongoing legal proceedings between Moby Grape and Katz, the surviving members of the band decided to dissolve the group once again in 2001. Finally, in 2006, and after three decades of court battles, the band finally won back its name; and subsequently reformed. As described in 1998 by David LaFlamme of It's A Beautiful Day, "Yes (Moby Grape) did, eventually they did win their case. In that case and in the (Jefferson) Airplane case, in both cases, the judge determined that (Matthew Katz) did business in a fraudulent and deceptive manner and that over the years he had continued to, what they call, 'muddy the water' by continually firing attorneys, making postponements and that these decisions could have been made years ago but he was making it impossible for that to happen. Now they have regained the rights to their songs and so on. Thank God. But most of the money that he has made doing to them what he has been doing to me is money he has already made. You can't get that. It's gone! It's gone!" To celebrate, in September 2007, a reunited Moby Grape performed for over 40,000 fans at the Summer of Love 40th Anniversary Celebration in San Francisco's Golden Gate Park. In October 2007, Sundazed Music reissued Moby Grape's first five albums (with bonus tracks) on CD and vinyl. The following month, the label was forced to both withdraw and recall Moby Grape, Wow and Grape Jam from print on both vinyl and CD because of a new lawsuit by former manager Katz. Sundazed stated on their website that they were directed to withdraw the three titles by Sony, from whom Sundazed had licensed the recordings. Following the reunion performance, Stevenson departed the band and semi-retired from the music industry. Moby Grape continues to perform occasionally, performing with core members Bob Mosley and Peter Lewis, and in such incarnations as with Skip Spence's son Omar joining on vocals and Jerry Miller's son Joseph on drums. New recording commenced in 2009, following the release of The Place and the Time, a well-received collection of demos, outtakes, alternate versions and otherwise unreleased material from the band's 1960s recording period.

In 2018 a detailed biography - What's Big And Purple And Lives In The Ocean?: The Moby Grape Story by Cam Cobb was published in the U.S. and the U.K. by Jawbone.

Guitarist and co-founder Alexander "Skip" Spence died April 16, 1999, at age 52.

Matthew Katz died on September 30, 2023, at the age of 93.

Guitarist and co-founder Jerry Miller died on July 20, 2024, at the age of 81.

=== Later releases ===
Subsequent to the withdrawal of Vintage, Sony released Cross Talk: The Best of Moby Grape (2004), followed by Listen My Friends! The Best of Moby Grape (2007). Legendary Grape was issued for the first time in CD by Dig Music in 2003. In 2009, Sundazed Music issued The Place and the Time, a two-disc collection of alternate takes, live versions and other previously unreleased material. In February 2010, Sundazed released the First Official Live Moby Grape 'Live' Album on Vinyl and Compact Disc formats.

=== Tribute albums ===
Moby Grape has been the subject of five fan-initiated tribute albums, whereby Moby Grape songs are covered by fans of the band. The series commenced with Mo'Grape (2000) and Even Mo'Grape (2002) and has been followed by Still Mo' Grape, Forever Mo and Just Say Mo.

== Work outside of Moby Grape ==
Lewis, Miller, Mosley and Stevenson continued to perform and record, contributing to various artist's projects.

Peter Lewis released a debut CD in 1995 and formed an acoustic duo with David West (released Live in Bremen, 2003). Lewis also spent three years (2000–2003) as a guitarist with the reformed Electric Prunes, contributing to the band's albums Artifact (2002) and California (2004).

Jerry Miller appeared as both a solo artist and as a member of the Jerry Miller Band, and played regularly prior to his death in 2024 in the Seattle/Tacoma, Washington area.

Bob Mosley's relocation to the Santa Cruz area was noteworthy for weekly guest appearances with country music artist Larry Hosford, and in occasional duos with ex-Doobie Brothers keyboardist Dale Ockerman. Don Stevenson, who has rejoined Moby Grape for occasional performances, has developed business interests outside of the music industry, including time share sales of recreational property in Whistler, British Columbia, Canada, where he maintains a residence.

In 2010, Don Stevenson, Jerry Miller and Omar Spence performed at the South by Southwest music festival (the performance at the Dirty Dog was recorded by Eric Sigsbey), while Peter Lewis appeared separately.

== Personnel ==
=== Members ===
Current members

- Peter Lewis – rhythm guitars, vocals (1966–1971, 1973–1975, 1977–1979, 1983–1984, 1987–1991, 1996–2001, 2006–present)
- Bob Mosley – bass, vocals (1966–1969, 1971, 1973–1975, 1983–1984, 1987–1991, 1996–2001, 2006–present)

Former members

- Jerry Miller – lead guitars, vocals (1966–1971, 1973–1975, 1977–1979, 1983–1984, 1987–1991, 1996–2001, 2006–2024; died 2024)
- Skip Spence – rhythm guitars, vocals (1966–1968, 1971, 1977–1979, 1987; died 1999)
- Don Stevenson – drums, vocals (1966–1971, 1983–1984, 1987–1991, 1996–2001, 2006–2007; occasional guest appearances after 2007)

Supporting musicians

- Joseph Miller – drums (2007–present)
- Omar Spence – vocals (2007–present)

Former supporting musicians

- Bob Moore – bass (1969; died 2021)
- Gordon Stevens – viola, dobro, mandolin (1971)
- Jeff Blackburn – rhythm guitars, vocals (1973–1975; died 2023)
- Johnny Craviotto – drums, vocals (1973–1975; died 2016)
- Cornelius Bumpus – keyboards, saxophone (1977–1979; died 2004)
- John Oxendine – drums (1977–1979)
- Chris Powell – bass (1977–1979)
- Daniel Spencer – drums (1977–1979)
- Dan Abernathy – rhythm guitars (1987–1991)

=== Line-ups ===
1966–1968	1968–1969	1969	1969–1971
Peter Lewis – rhythm guitars, vocals; Jerry Miller – lead guitars, vocals; Bob Mosley – bass, vocals; Skip Spence – rhythm guitars, vocals; Don Stevenson – drums, vocals	Peter Lewis – rhythm guitars, vocals; Jerry Miller – lead guitars, vocals; Bob Mosley – bass, vocals; Don Stevenson – drums, vocals	Peter Lewis – rhythm guitars, vocals; Jerry Miller – lead guitars, vocals; Don Stevenson – drums, vocals; with: Bob Moore – bass (studio tracks)	Disbanded
1971	1971–1973	1973–1975	1975–1977
Peter Lewis – rhythm guitars, vocals; Jerry Miller – lead guitars, vocals; Bob Mosley – bass, vocals; Skip Spence – rhythm guitars, vocals; Don Stevenson – drums, vocals; with: Gordon Stevens – viola, dobro, mandolin	Disbanded	Peter Lewis – rhythm guitars, vocals; Jerry Miller – lead guitars, vocals; Bob Mosley – bass, vocals; with: Jeff Blackburn – rhythm guitars, vocals; Johnny Craviotto – drums, vocals	Disbanded
1977–1979	1979–1983	1983–1984	1984–1987
Peter Lewis – rhythm guitars, vocals; Jerry Miller – lead guitars, vocals; Skip Spence – rhythm guitars, vocals; with: Cornelius Bumpus – keyboards, saxophone; John Oxendine – drums; Chris Powell – bass; Daniel Spencer – drums	Disbanded	Peter Lewis – rhythm guitars, vocals; Jerry Miller – lead guitars, vocals; Bob Mosley – bass, vocals; Don Stevenson – drums, vocals	Disbanded
1987	1987–1991	1991–1996	1996–2001
Peter Lewis – rhythm guitars, vocals; Jerry Miller – lead guitars, vocals; Bob Mosley – bass, vocals; Skip Spence – rhythm guitars, vocals; Don Stevenson – drums, vocals	Peter Lewis – rhythm guitars, vocals; Jerry Miller – lead guitars, vocals; Bob Mosley – bass, vocals; Don Stevenson – drums, vocals; with: Dan Abernathy – rhythm guitars	Disbanded	Peter Lewis – rhythm guitars, vocals; Jerry Miller – lead guitars, vocals; Bob Mosley – bass, vocals; Don Stevenson – drums, vocals
2001–2006	2006–2007	2007–2024	2024–present
Disbanded	Peter Lewis – rhythm guitars, vocals; Jerry Miller – lead guitars, vocals; Bob Mosley – bass, vocals; Don Stevenson – drums, vocals	Peter Lewis – rhythm guitars, vocals; Jerry Miller – lead guitars, vocals; Bob Mosley – bass, vocals; with: Joseph Miller – drums; Omar Spence – vocals; Don Stevenson – drums, vocals (guest appearances)	Peter Lewis – rhythm guitars, vocals; Bob Mosley – bass, vocals; with: Joseph Miller – drums; Omar Spence – vocals; Don Stevenson – drums, vocals (guest appearances)

== Discography ==
Contains Billboard (BB) and Cashbox (CB) chart peak positions.

=== Studio albums ===
- 1967 – Moby Grape - No. 24 US
- 1968 – Wow/Grape Jam - No. 20 US
- 1969 – Moby Grape '69 No. 113 US
- 1969 – Truly Fine Citizen No. 157 US
- 1971 – 20 Granite Creek No. 177 US
- 1984 – Moby Grape '84 (also known as "Silver Wheels" or "The Heart Album")
- 1989 – Legendary Grape

=== Live albums ===
- 1978 – Live Grape
- 2010 – Moby Grape Live

=== Compilations ===
- 1971 – Omaha (features '69 album without tracks "Ooh Mama Ooh" and 'Seeing'; plus "Omaha" from 1st album)
- 1971 – Great Grape
- 1986 – Murder in My Heart – compilation album of selections from Wow, Moby Grape '69 and Truly Fine Citizen.
- 1993 – Vintage: The Very Best of Moby Grape
- 2004 – Crosstalk: The Best of Moby Grape
- 2007 – Listen My Friends! The Best of Moby Grape
- 2009 – The Place and the Time

=== Singles ===
- 1967 – "Fall On You" / "Changes" — Columbia 44170
- 1967 – "Sitting By The Window" / "Indifference" (2:46 edit) – Columbia 44171
- 1967 – "8:05" / "Mister Blues" — Columbia 44172
- 1967 – "Omaha" (BB No. 88, CB No. 70, RPM No. 87) / "Someday" — Columbia 44173
- 1967 – "Hey Grandma" (BB No. 127, CB No. 94) / "Come In The Morning" — Columbia 44174
- 1968 – "Can't Be So Bad" / "Bitter Wind" — Columbia 44567
- 1969 – "Trucking Man" / "If You Can't Learn From My Mistakes" — Columbia 44789
- 1969 – "Ooh Mama Ooh" / "It's A Beautiful Day Today" — Columbia 44885
- 1971 – "Gypsy Wedding" / "Apocalypse" — Reprise 1040
- 1971 – "Goin' Down To Texas" / "About Time" — Reprise 1055
- 1972 – "Gone Fishin'" / "Gypsy Wedding" — Reprise 1096 (Mosley solo single)

== Other notable records ==
=== Fine Wine ===
- 1976 – Fine Wine (by band of the same name; featuring Miller and Mosley with Michael Been and Johnny Craviotto)

== See also ==
- Summer of Love
- List of bands from the San Francisco Bay Area
