= Moby Grape (album) =

Studio album by Moby Grape
- Released: June 6, 1967
- Recorded: March 11 – April 25, 1967
- Studios: CBS, Hollywood
- Genres: Psychedelic rock; power pop; country rock
- Length: 30:47
- Label: Columbia
- Producer: David Rubinson

Moby Grape chronology
Moby Grape (1967)	Wow/Grape Jam (1968)

Singles from Moby Grape
- 1. "Fall on You / Changes" Released: June 6, 1967; 2. "Sitting By the Window / Indifference" Released: June 6, 1967; 3. "8:05 / Mr. Blues" Released: June 6, 1967; 4. "Omaha / Someday" Released: June 6, 1967; 5. "Hey Grandma / Come In The Morning" Released: June 6, 1967

Moby Grape is the 1967 debut studio album by rock band Moby Grape. Coming from the San Francisco scene, their reputation quickly grew to immense proportions, leading to a bidding war and a contract with Columbia Records. The album peaked at #24 on the Billboard 200 albums chart in September 1967.

== Production ==
Production began on Moby Grape in Los Angeles in March 1967. Produced by David Rubinson, the thirteen tracks were recorded over six weeks, from March 11 to April 25, at a cost of $11,000. Another song "Rounder" was also recorded, but no lyrics or vocals were completed for it at the time.

== Artwork ==
The cover photograph is by rock photographer Jim Marshall. On the original release, Don Stevenson is shown "flipping the bird" (making an obscene gesture) on the washboard. It was airbrushed out on subsequent pressings, but the UK reissue on Edsel/Demon restored it.

The flag behind Skip Spence is actually a United States flag that Columbia Records decided to obscure through airbrushing, presumably due to the political climate of the times. On the original release, the flag is colored red. When the cover was revised to remove the offending finger mentioned above, the flag was changed from red to black, again presumably due to possible political interpretations (the association of the color red with communism). The Edsel vinyl (1984) and CD (1989) re-issues restored the photo to its original state, with Don Stevenson's displayed finger and an un-airbrushed United States flag. Other CD re-issues use the cover from the first pressing, with the finger intact and the flag tinted red.

== Reception ==
Professional ratings
Review scores
Source	Rating
AllMusic	5/5 stars
Rolling Stone	5/5 stars
The Village Voice	A−
Encyclopedia of Popular Music	5/5 stars

Released by Columbia on June 6, 1967, simultaneously with ten of the thirteen songs on five singles: "Fall on You"/"Changes", "Sitting By the Window"/"Indifference" (2:46 edit), "8:05"/"Mister Blues", "Omaha"/"Someday" and "Hey Grandma"/Come in the Morning". Of these five, only "Omaha" and "Hey Grandma" charted. All five records were issued with picture sleeves showing the same album cover photo.

Nevertheless, as Gene Sculatti and Davin Seay write in their book San Francisco Nights, Moby Grape "remains one of the very few psychedelic masterpieces ever recorded." The original Billboard review noted the unusual promotion campaign behind the group before simply stating "it has what it takes." Justin Farrar considered that "(i)t's no understatement to hail the group's 1967 debut as the ancestral link between psychedelia, country rock, glam, power pop and punk." In addition, the 1983 Rolling Stone Record Guide said their "debut LP is as fresh and exhilarating today as it was when it exploded out of San Francisco during 1967's summer of love." In 2003, the album was ranked number 121 on Rolling Stone magazine's list of the 500 greatest albums of all time, and 124 in a 2012 revised listing. It was also voted number 98 in Colin Larkin's All Time Top 1000 Albums 3rd Edition (2000).

The album was included in Robert Christgau's "Basic Record Library" of 1950s and 1960s recordings, published in Christgau's Record Guide: Rock Albums of the Seventies (1981). As reviewed by Mark Deming in AllMusic, "Moby Grape is as refreshing today as it was upon first release, and if fate prevented the group from making a follow-up that was as consistently strong, for one brief shining moment Moby Grape proved to the world they were one of America's great bands. While history remembers the Grateful Dead and Jefferson Airplane as being more important, the truth is neither group ever made an album quite this good."

In 2008, Skip Spence's song "Omaha" was listed as number 95 in Rolling Stone's "100 Greatest Guitar Songs of All Time". The song was described there as follows: "On their best single, Jerry Miller, Peter Lewis and Skip Spence compete in a three-way guitar battle for two and a quarter red-hot minutes, each of them charging at Spence's song from different angles, no one yielding to anyone else." Writing in 1967, shortly after the album's release, Crawdaddy! creator Paul Williams described "Omaha" as "the toughest cut on the album (and) one of the finest recorded examples of the wall-of-sound approach in rock. It surges and roars like a tidal wave restrained by a seawall."

In 2017, Bill Pearis of BrooklynVegan said the album was "full of breezy jams, killer harmonies, impeccable musicianship and a whole bunch of instant classics."

== 2007 Sundazed reissue ==
On October 9, 2007, Sundazed Music released a remastered CD version of the album's stereo mix containing bonus tracks, some of which were previously unreleased. In addition, Sundazed also released the album's mono mix on LP, but with no bonus tracks. Both the CD and LP versions were taken out of print, along with Wow and Grape Jam, on November 3, 2007, for reasons not officially stated. It has been widely circulated among the Moby Grape mailing list that former manager Matthew Katz, with whom the band has been in legal battles since the late 1960s, threatened to file a lawsuit against Sundazed claiming ownership of the album artwork.

== Notable covers and soundtrack inclusions ==
Robert Plant covered "8:05" and "Naked If I Want To" as B-sides to 1993 singles; "8:05" is also included on the expanded reissue of his Fate of Nations album on Rhino Records. Robert Plant also performed "Hey Grandma" live when with his pre-Led Zeppelin Band of Joy, during the 1967-1968 period. The Move covered "Hey Grandma" on their self-titled first album, released in 1968. More recently, "Hey Grandma" was included in the soundtrack to the 2005 Sean Penn-Nicole Kidman film, The Interpreter, as well as being covered in 2009 by the Black Crowes, on Warpaint Live.

Cat Power has recorded two covers of "Naked, If I Want To" which appeared on her 2000 album The Covers Record and on the limited edition of her 2008 album Jukebox.

"Omaha" has been covered by The Golden Palominos in 1985 on their Visions of Excess album, with Michael Stipe on lead vocal. The song has also occasionally been performed live in concert by Bruce Springsteen.

"Ain't No Use" has been covered by bluegrass band Long Road Home.

"8:05" appears on Christy McWilson's 2002 album Bed of Roses, as a duet with Dave Alvin, and on the 2013 album Have Harmony, Will Travel as a duet by Peter Case and Carla Olson.

British band Diesel Park West have covered many Moby Grape songs both on record and live. From this album, they covered "Lazy Me" on their outtakes album Flipped from 1990. They have covered "Fall On You" live and based the opening track, "Charlotte, It’s All Over" from their latest album Do Come In, Excuse The Mess around the guitar riff.

In 2015, band member Peter Lewis's daughter Arwen recorded a track-by-track cover of the album. It released October 2, 2015.

== Track listing ==
Side one
No.	Title	Writer	Length
1.	"Hey Grandma"	Jerry Miller, Don Stevenson	2:43
2.	"Mr. Blues"	Bob Mosley	1:58
3.	"Fall on You"	Peter Lewis	1:53
4.	"8:05"	Miller, Stevenson	2:17
5.	"Come in the Morning"	Mosley	2:20
6.	"Omaha"	Skip Spence	2:19
7.	"Naked, If I Want To"	Miller	0:55

Side two
No.	Title	Writer	Length
1.	"Someday"	Miller, Stevenson, Spence	2:41
2.	"Ain't No Use"	Miller, Stevenson	1:37
3.	"Sitting by the Window"	Lewis	2:44
4.	"Changes"	Miller, Stevenson	3:21
5.	"Lazy Me"	Mosley	1:45
6.	"Indifference"	Spence	4:14

Bonus Tracks, 2007 Sundazed CD edition
No.	Title	Writer	Length
14.	"Rounder" (Instrumental)	Spence	2:02
15.	"Looper" (Audition recording)	Lewis	2:36
16.	"Indifference" (Audition recording)	Spence	2:51
17.	"Bitter Wind" (Previously unreleased)	Mosley	2:38
18.	"Sweet Ride (Never Again)" (Long version previously unreleased; from the motion picture The Sweet Ride, 1968)	Spence, Miller, Mosley, Stevenson, Lewis	5:56

== Personnel ==
Moby Grape

- Peter Lewis – rhythm guitar, vocals
- Jerry Miller – lead guitar, vocals
- Bob Mosley – bass, vocals
- Skip Spence – rhythm guitar, vocals
- Don Stevenson – drums, vocals

== Charts ==
Album - Billboard

Year	Chart	Position
1967	Pop Albums	24

Singles - Billboard

Year	Single	Chart	Position
1967	"Omaha"	Pop Singles	88
1967	"Hey Grandma"	Pop Singles	127
