= Matthew Katz =

American music producer (1929–2023)

Matthew Katz (December 20, 1929 – September 30, 2023) was an American music manager and producer, most notably as the manager of Jefferson Airplane, Moby Grape and It's a Beautiful Day. He was the owner of the record label San Francisco Sound, and the owner of Matthew Katz Productions.

== Career ==
Katz started his career in music in the 1960s, as the manager of three San Francisco-based bands, Jefferson Airplane, Moby Grape and It's A Beautiful Day. He is known for controversial practices that were criticized for not being in the best interest of the artists he managed. In October 1966, when CBS Records offered a contract to Moby Grape, Katz coerced the band into giving up ownership of their name and all of their publishing rights or else he would block them from signing with the label. Moby Grape fired Katz in late 1967.

His acrimonious relationship with the band would continue to deteriorate for decades as Katz continued to collect all of their royalties for himself. In 2005, the Superior Court Of California decreed that all ownership rights relating to recordings and songs prior to 1973 are the sole property of Moby Grape. It also stipulated that Katz was to pay back royalties, and that the band members now owned the Moby Grape name. Katz appealed, but the Court Of Appeal upheld the original verdict in 2006. When Sundazed Music tried to bring the band's catalog back into print, Katz threatened them with litigation over ownership of the album artwork. The band's work remained out-of-print as of 2007 largely due to his efforts.

In addition to the long-standing legal issues with Moby Grape, lawsuits between Katz and Jefferson Airplane were in the courts for 21 years, and an even longer period with It's a Beautiful Day.

Katz was also the owner of San Francisco Sound Records, which has released original or licensed material by Jefferson Airplane, Moby Grape, It's a Beautiful Day and Tim Hardin, among others. The company released Hardin's Unforgiven in 1981, his last recordings.

Other groups that Katz worked with included Tripsichord Music Box and a group from Seattle originally named West Coast Natural Gas, which Katz renamed Indian Puddin' and Pipe.

Katz opened two different music showcases named San Francisco Sound: the Seattle location was in a building on Capitol Hill originally named The Encore Ballroom and operated between 1967 and 1969; the other location was in Tottenville, Staten Island, in New York City.

Katz died on September 30, 2023, at the age of 93.
