= Peter Lewis (musician) =

American musician

- Born: July 15, 1945 (age 81)
- Genres: Rock
- Occupation: Musician
- Instruments: Singing, guitar
- Labels: Taxim; OMAD
- Member of: Moby Grape
- Formerly of: Electric Prunes; The Explosives
- Mother: Loretta Young
- Relatives: Christopher Lewis (brother); Judy Lewis (half-sister); David Lindley (cousin); Polly Ann Young (aunt); Sally Blane (aunt); Ricardo Montalban (uncle)

Peter Charles Lewis (born July 15, 1945) is one of the founding members of the band Moby Grape. Three of his better known songs with Moby Grape are "Fall on You" and "Sitting by the Window" from the self-titled first Moby Grape album and "If You Can't Learn from My Mistakes" from Moby Grape '69.

== Background ==
The younger of the two sons of actress Loretta Young (1913–2000) and writer-producer Tom Lewis (1901–1988), Peter Lewis spent much of his childhood in Hollywood. His elder brother, Christopher (1944–2021), was a writer and television producer. The brothers were the nephews of actors Polly Ann Young, Sally Blane, and Ricardo Montalban (husband of Loretta Young's half-sister, Georgiana Young), and were the half-brothers of Judy Lewis (d. 2011), their mother's child by Clark Gable. Musician David Lindley was a cousin.

As a youth, Lewis attended military school. Following a stint in the Air Force, he became a commercial pilot, initially working for Shell Oil. As for his musical career, Lewis cited Tim Hardin and Fred Neil as important influences, and credited Linda McCartney (née Eastman) with introducing him to their music.

== Moby Grape bandmates ==
Beyond his work as a musician, Lewis has been noted for his efforts in assisting fellow Moby Grape bandmates Skip Spence (d. 1999) and Bob Mosley in battling the challenges of schizophrenia. At age 11, while his parents were embroiled in an acrimonious divorce and custody dispute, he suffered a nervous breakdown in New York City and was involuntarily hospitalized for a period. In 1969, he recalled, "I was under the care of a psychiatrist, taking all this Librium so I could stay with the band."

Mosley credited Lewis with helping him end approximately five years of homelessness in the 1990s. Mosley describes the circumstances as follows: "In 1996, Peter Lewis picked me up along the side of a San Diego freeway where I was living, to tell me a ruling by San Francisco Judge Garcia gave Moby Grape their name back. I was ready to go to work again." Lewis was skeptical about Spence being labeled a schizophrenic because recognized treatments were not resulting in any noticeable improvements. As a result, Lewis sought and participated in alternative healing therapies with Spence involving metaphysics. "Through my dad, who'd become a born-again Christian, I'd met these monks in Lucia above Big Sur, who were really serious about rational metaphysics. Their faith beyond reason overwhelms you every time. Since the doctors couldn't help Skippy - they kept objectifying his problem: 'He's a paranoid schizophrenic' and were never going to heal him. All they were interested in was keeping him out of McDonald's with a machine gun, so it (the monastery) was the only place I could think of to take him."

== Recent career ==
In addition to performing occasionally with Moby Grape, Lewis was a guitarist with the reformed Electric Prunes (2000–2003), contributing to their Artifact album. His connection to The Electric Prunes commenced in the 1960s, through the late guitarist Ron Morgan (1945-1989). Morgan, originally from Colby, Kansas, had relocated to Los Angeles and played with Lewis in one of Lewis' early bands, Peter and The Wolves. Morgan then went on to join The West Coast Pop Art Experimental Band, as well as an early version of Three Dog Night and, thereafter, a reformed version of The Electric Prunes, playing on the Just Good Old Rock and Roll album. He developed a career as a solo artist, and released three albums on the Taxim label: Peter Lewis, Peter Lewis with David West Live in Bremen, and Peter Lewis with David West Live at the Lobero Theatre. Lewis occasionally performs as a duo with David West, his collaborator on Live in Bremen and Live at the Lobero Theatre. For a series of pictures of Peter Lewis and David West, performing in 2003, see here.

In 2010, Lewis appeared with Stu Cook at the SXSW festival, performing with The Explosives. Jerry Miller, Don Stevenson and Omar Spence, son of Skip Spence, also appeared at a different venue, but on the same day, at SXSW, performing as "New Wine". For reasons not publicly known, Lewis did not join his former bandmates in performance. As of 2011, Lewis was writing songs and performing with poet M.L. Liebler.

== Solo discography ==
- Peter Lewis (1995)
- Live in Bremen (2003, with David West)
- "Live at the Lobero Theatre" (2013, with David West)
- Just Like Jack (2017)
- The Road To Zion (2019)
- Imagination (2023)
