= Bob Mosley =

American musician (born 1942)

James Robert "Bob" Mosley
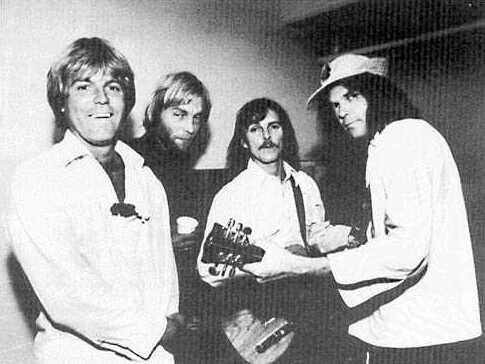
- Mosley (2nd from the left) as part of The Ducks band in 1977

Background information
- Born: December 4, 1942 (age 83); San Diego, California, U.S.
- Member of: Moby Grape
- Formerly of: The Vejtables; The Ducks

James Robert "Bob" Mosley (born December 4, 1942) is an American musician principally known as the bass player and one of the songwriters and vocalists for the band Moby Grape. Some of his best-known songs with Moby Grape are "Mr. Blues", "Come In The Morning", and "Lazy Me" from the first Moby Grape album (1967), and "Gypsy Wedding" from the 20 Granite Creek (1971) album.

== Biography ==
Mosley spent his adolescence in San Diego, where he graduated from Kearny High School. One of the first bands that he organized in San Diego was called The Misfits, who had one single on Imperial Records (Imperial61054) and one on Troy Records (Troy222) in the early 1960s. After playing with the Joel Scott Hill Trio, he relocated to San Francisco, where he played with The Vejtables for a brief period. He also played and sang with Jerry Miller and Don Stevenson in The Frantics, "Someday" (not the Moby Grape song) and "Human Monkey" on Action Records (AF1113) in 1966. Mosley has had a varied musical career, including a prominent but interrupted role in Moby Grape during the 1967-1971 period, and the commencement of a solo career in 1972. The following year he formed the Darrow Mosley Band with Chris Darrow (formerly of Nitty Gritty Dirt Band and Kaleidoscope) and issued one album, Desert Rain.

In 1977 Mosley played with Neil Young in a band called The Ducks, with Jeff Blackburn (guitar and vocals) and John Craviotto (drums and vocals), which had a brief life during that year.

Mosley's career has been plagued by the challenges of schizophrenia, as was the case with Moby Grape bandmate Skip Spence. Both musicians were homeless for several years. Mosley's schizophrenia was first diagnosed in 1968. Mosley shocked the remaining band members by leaving the band to enlist in the Marines. It was during basic training that Mosley was first diagnosed with paranoid schizophrenia. He was discharged from the Marines nine months after basic training.

In 1996, three of Mosley's fellow band members, Jerry Miller, Peter Lewis and Don Stevenson, in part reformed Moby Grape with the objective of helping Mosley recover emotionally and financially. Bob Mosley describes the circumstances as follows: "In 1996, Peter Lewis picked me up along the side of a San Diego freeway where I was living, to tell me a ruling by San Francisco Judge Garcia gave Moby Grape their name back. I was ready to go to work again" in relation to the circumstances ultimately leading to the recording of True Blue. Earlier attempts by Moby Grape band members to help Mosley out of homelessness had been less successful. One such attempt is described by Peter Lewis as follows: "We went to find Bob, and there he was, living in this cardboard box. He had these friends, the squirrels and the lizards that he had. And I brought this guitar, cost me a hundred bucks, you know, and I left that with him and a tape of Moby Grape songs and a tape recorder with batteries in it and some extra batteries. So the next weekend, I came back, and there was no guitar, but the cassette case... He had tried to tear all the tape out of it and had left it, you know, down there in the bushes. And that's all that was left. Bob was gone, you know," as per article by Paul Conley. The reformation was troubled for some time as Mosley believed Stevenson was trying to kill him. Stevenson eventually left the band.

Mosley's bass preference is a Fender Precision bass.

Unlike bandmate Skip Spence, whose musical output largely ceased within a few years of the onset of schizophrenia, Bob Mosley has been able to continue to write songs and record music for much of his life. His most recent solo release is True Blue (2005), released on the Taxim label. True Blue was reissued on Steadyboy Records in 2024. His debut album Bob Mosley was reissued by OMAD Records in 2024.

== Solo discography ==
- Bob Mosley (Reprise, 1972)
- The Darrow Mosley Band (Shagrat, 1973) [3 Song EP]
- Wine and Roses (Nightshift, 1986) [acoustic 5 song mini-album]
- Mosley Grape Live at Indigo Ranch (San Francisco Sound, 1989)
- Never Dreamed (Taxim, 1999)
- True Blue (Taxim, 2005) (Steadyboy, 2024)
- Bob Mosley (Omad, 2024) (Remastered and remixed)
