= Don Stevenson =

American drummer (born 1941)

Don Stevenson (born October 15, 1941) is the American drummer and a singer and songwriter for Moby Grape, a band which was formed in San Francisco in 1966 and continues to perform occasionally today.

== Biography ==
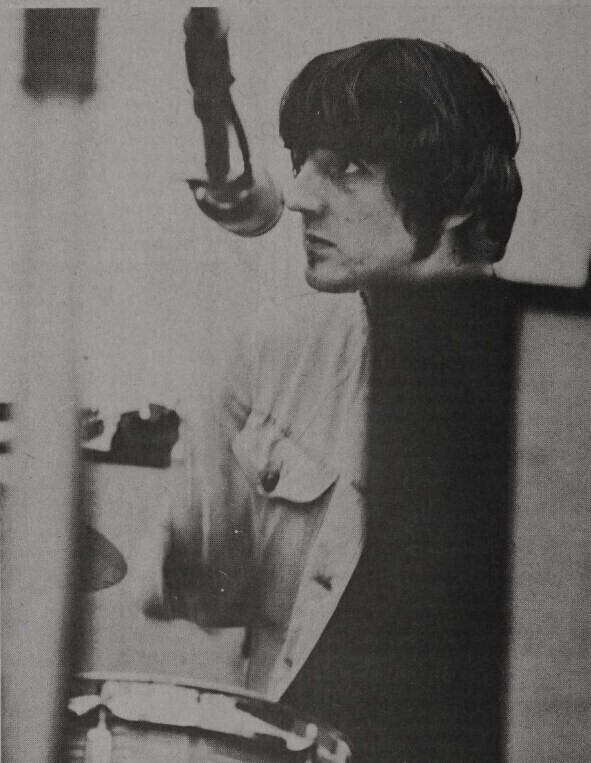
Stevenson in 1967

Born October 15, 1941, in Seattle, Stevenson first obtained local recognition as a member of The Frantics, a band based in Seattle and including fellow Washingtonian Jerry Miller (from Tacoma) on guitar. The band relocated to San Francisco in 1966 and formed the nucleus of what became Moby Grape.

Stevenson's position in Moby Grape is similar to, but predates that of Don Henley of The Eagles, in that Stevenson was a drummer and a principal songwriter and lead singer.

With Jerry Miller, Stevenson is the co-writer of three of Moby Grape's best known songs, "Hey Grandma" and "8:05", both from Moby Grape's self-titled first album (1967) and "Murder In My Heart for The Judge", from the Wow album (1968). The latter song was covered by both Three Dog Night and Lee Michaels, while Robert Plant covered "8:05" and The Move covered "Hey Grandma". He continued to write with Jerry Miller during the course of Moby Grape's four albums with Columbia Records (1967-1969). In later years, such as on Moby Grape's Legendary Grape album (1989) and beginning with 20 Granite Creek (1971), Stevenson contributed songs that were solely composed.

Stevenson is the only member of Moby Grape to continue in music while at the same time developing occupational interests outside of music. Stevenson has become well known in real estate circles, such as in relation to the sale of time shares in Whistler, British Columbia, Canada, a resort location where he maintains a residence. As of 2006, Stevenson, with over twenty years of industry experience, was the National Sales Director of Club Intrawest, owned by the Intrawest Corporation.

In 2007, Stevenson appeared with Moby Grape at the 40th anniversary San Francisco "Summer of Love" reunion. In 2010, Stevenson performed with Jerry Miller and Omar Spence (son of deceased Moby Grape bandmate Skip Spence) at the South by Southwest festival. Stevenson shared lead vocals with Miller and performed a number of Moby Grape "classics", in addition to new material developed and recorded with Miller in 2009.

Despite success as a singer, songwriter and musician, Stevenson was, until 2010, the only member of Moby Grape not to have released a solo album. In late 2010, his first solo album was released. As described by noted critic David Fricke, "(t)he music is an engaging blend of country, blues and R&B, like Jerry Garcia's solo records, but with a rougher-timber feel in the singing and playing, plus Miller contributing guitars and harmonies".
