= Jerry Miller =

American musician (1943–2024)

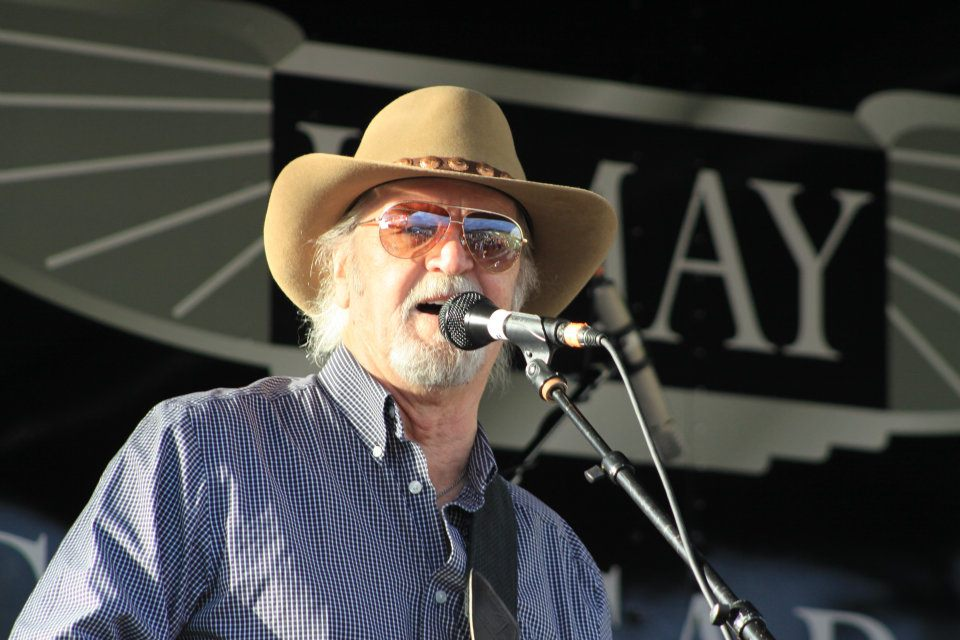
- Miller in 2012

Background information
- Born: July 10, 1943; Tacoma, Washington, U.S.
- Died: July 20, 2024 (aged 81) Tacoma, Washington, U.S.
- Genres: Rock; folk rock; psychedelic rock
- Occupations: Musician; songwriter
- Instruments: Guitar; vocals
- Formerly of: Moby Grape; The Frantics; The Rhythm Dukes

Jerry Miller (July 10, 1943 – July 20, 2024) was an American songwriter, guitarist and vocalist. He performed as a solo artist and as a member of the Jerry Miller Band. He was also a founding member of the 1960s San Francisco band Moby Grape, which continues to perform occasionally. Rolling Stone included Miller at number 68 on their list of the 100 greatest guitarists of all time and Moby Grape's album Moby Grape at number 124 on their 2012 list of 500 greatest albums of all time. Miller's longtime (since the early 1960s) guitar was a Gibson L-5 CES Florentine guitar which he called "Beulah".

== Early life and education ==
Miller was born in Tacoma, Washington on July 10, 1943. He attended Lincoln High School in Tacoma through the mid-1960's.

== Career ==
=== Early years: late 1950s–1966 ===
His career began in the late 1950s, playing and recording with popular Northwest dance-rock bands including the Elegants and the Frantics. He contributed guitar work to an early version of the hit record "I Fought the Law" by The Bobby Fuller Four, and toured with Bobby Fuller in his predecessor group to The Bobby Fuller Four.

While both were playing locally in Seattle, prior to becoming internationally famous, Jerry Miller befriended Jimi Hendrix. Along with Larry Coryell, who was developing his reputation as a guitarist while attending the University of Washington in Seattle, they would regularly get together to watch touring bands visiting the Seattle area. One particular club was the Spanish Castle, in Des Moines, Washington, between Seattle and Tacoma. The later Hendrix song, "Spanish Castle Magic", was based on his experiences with fellow guitarists at the Spanish Castle in Des Moines.

=== Formation and evolution of Moby Grape, 1966–1969 ===
Before co-founding Moby Grape, Miller and bandmate Don Stevenson were members of The Frantics, a Pacific Northwest bar band based in Seattle, who had some local fame with records on Dolton, a Seattle record company. The band relocated to San Francisco and, with the addition of Bob Mosley, formed the nucleus of what would become Moby Grape. Moby Grape was formed in San Francisco in 1966. Jerry Miller was the lead guitarist in the three-guitar band. The Grape signed with Columbia and recorded four albums for that label, released between 1967 and 1969. During this period, Miller co-wrote (with Don Stevenson) three of Moby Grape's best known songs, "Hey Grandma" and "8.05", both from the self-titled first Moby Grape album (1967) and "Murder In My Heart for The Judge", from the Wow album (1968). The latter song was covered by both Three Dog Night and Lee Michaels, while Robert Plant covered "8:05" and The Move covered "Hey Grandma". More recently, "Hey Grandma" was included in the soundtrack to the 2005 film, The Interpreter, as well as being covered in 2009 by the Black Crowes, on Warpaint Live.

Moby Grape toured the U.S. and Europe, but fell apart in 1970. Members regrouped for the album 20 Granite Creek on Reprise Records in 1971 and played and recorded intermittently thereafter, in various configurations. Moby Grape continues to perform occasionally.

=== The Rhythm Dukes, 1969–1971 ===
In the late summer of 1969, subsequent to the release of Truly Fine Citizen, Moby Grape's last album for Columbia, Jerry Miller and Don Stevenson joined with John Barrett (bass) and John "Fuzzy" Oxendine (drums) to form The Rhythm Dukes. Don Stevenson played guitar, rather than drums. It is speculated that he left the band shortly after its formation for that reason, preferring to remain a drummer. The band came together at Jerry Miller's initiative, at a time when the future of Moby Grape was uncertain. The band lived together in Santa Cruz, and was later joined by Bill Champlin on organ and vocals. Champlin, along with Miller, became the group's principal songwriters. The Rhythm Dukes shared the stage with such artists as Albert Collins, Lee Michaels, The Flying Burrito Brothers, Canned Heat, The Grateful Dead and Cat Mother & the All Night Newsboys, generally being second-billed. They recorded one album in 1970, which saw release in 2005 as Flashback, featuring three Jerry Miller songs. The Rhythm Dukes disbanded in 1971, when Moby Grape reformed to record 20 Granite Creek.

=== Continuing career: 1971–1995 ===
Miller went on to share the stage with Jimi Hendrix, Eric Clapton, B.B. King, and The Doors. His admirers include Jimmy Page, Stephen Stills, David Crosby, Taj Mahal, David Fricke, Eric Clapton, and Robert Plant. Clapton called Jerry the "best guitar player in the world" when he first came to the U.S. Plant cites Miller as a major influence for Led Zeppelin – the band even played Moby Grape songs at its first rehearsal. Led Zeppelin and the Grateful Dead are just two of the bands that have covered Miller songs live and on record.

He was #68 on Rolling Stone's 2003 list of the 100 greatest guitarists of all time, ahead of Eddie Van Halen (#70), Johnny Winter (#74), Robbie Robertson (#78), David Gilmour (#82), Neil Young (#83), Robbie Krieger (#91), Angus Young (#96) and Leigh Stephens (#98). In being so ranked, he was described as follows: "His playing was never self-indulgent, and his soloing was propulsive, always aware of where the song was headed." "Hey Grandma", from Moby Grape's first album, is cited as an essential recording of Jerry Miller.

=== After 1995: return to Tacoma ===
Beginning in 1995, Miller was based in Tacoma, Washington, for the most part living a few blocks from his childhood home. He fronted The Jerry Miller Band, with Tom Murphy and Darin Watkins on drums and Kim Workman on bass, among other musicians. In July 2007, the Jerry Miller Band performed in Monterey for the 40th Anniversary of the Monterey Pop Festival.

In July 2008, Miller participated in a benefit to raise funds for medical care for Rick Burton, a bassist with the Jerry Miller Band and a close personal friend, whose days of playing with Jerry was about four years. They had been in The Elegants together. In the 1990s and early 2000s, Burton had been in another band fronted by Jerry Miller, DiaBando. He had also contributed to a 2005 benefit when Miller himself was in need of assistance to fund the Jerry A. Miller Foundation for the Advancement of The Arts, with an objective of using local facilities to provide practice and teaching space for local musicians. In the fall of 2007, the 60-year-old Burton had been assaulted and gravely injured in what was viewed as a random, gang-oriented attack, where those responsible have not yet been found. The benefit, "Harm None" was also intended to raise awareness about violence in Tacoma.

In the summer of 2009, Miller joined the "California '66" package tour, featuring reformed versions of The Electric Prunes and Love. Miller substituted for Sky Saxon, who had been scheduled to perform with The Seeds, but who died unexpectedly a month before the tour was set to begin. Miller performed with his own band, rather than with a Moby Grape configuration.

== Personal life and death ==
In January 2009, Miller lost almost all of his personal possessions and career memorabilia to flood damage. Included in the loss were numerous concert tapes and photographs of Miller with musicians including Jimi Hendrix and Robert Plant. Local Tacoma musicians held two benefit concerts to assist Miller financially.

Miller died in Tacoma on July 20, 2024, at the age of 81.

== Solo discography ==
- Now I See (1993)
- Life Is Like That (1995; Jerry Miller Band)
- Live At Cole's (1998; Jerry Miller & Co.)
