= Bill Bentley (music producer) =

American music industry executive

- Born: August 24, 1950 (age 76); Houston, Texas
- Occupations: Music industry executive, journalist
- Years active: 1970s-present
- Notable work: Tribute albums including Where the Pyramid Meets the Eye, More Oar, and Keep Your Soul

Bill Bentley (born August 24, 1950, Houston, Texas, United States) is an American music industry executive, particularly notable for having produced tribute albums of the music of significant cult artists Roky Erickson (1990), Skip Spence (1999), Doug Sahm (2009) and Lou Reed (2024), in addition to other recording projects.

== Early life ==
Bill Bentley was born in Houston, Texas in 1950 and attended Lamar High School. He commenced playing drums at an early age. His music career started at the age of fifteen, when he interned at the KYOK-AM radio station in Houston. While in high school, he formed a band called The Aggregation, the local rivals of which were The Coachmen, from neighbouring Lee High School and featuring guitarist Billy Gibbons, later of ZZ Top. Bentley grew up in the newspaper business; his father, Bud Bentley, was a cartoonist and later the art director at the Houston Post.

Bentley attended Southwestern University in Georgetown, Texas and later the University of Texas at Austin, where he joined a band of English majors called The Bizarros. The band was notable for including Velvet Underground founding member Sterling Morrison. Bentley had also developed an admiration for the 13th Floor Elevators during the Sixties, following the band extensively to dozens of Houston concerts starting at La Maison in 1965 on through to their last performances at Love Street Light Circus and Feel Good Machine in 1968.

== Career ==
=== Journalism ===
Bentley had developed typesetting skills, and was able to use these as an entry to a position in 1974 as the music editor at the Austin Sun bi-weekly newspaper. In 1978, Bentley became the in-house publicist for KLRN-TV in Austin, as well as for the stations' long-running television show, Austin City Limits.

In 1980, he became the music editor at the L.A. Weekly, being one of six people forming the core of the first editorial staff at that paper.

=== Music industry ===
Entering the record business, Bentley became the director of publicity at Slash Records and rose to become a senior vice president of media relations at Warner Bros. Records. In his role as a publicist, he has worked with such artists as Los Lobos, Elvis Costello, The Blasters, Green Day, X, Lou Reed, The Red Hot Chili Peppers and R.E.M. As a record company executive, he has provided guidance to the careers of such artists as Doug Sahm, ZZ Top and Wilco. In addition, throughout a career in music that spans over forty years, he has been a writer of liner notes to numerous record releases.

In 1990, upon learning of the financial distress of Roky Erickson, founder of the 13th Floor Elevators, Bentley organized a tribute album for him, for the purpose of raising funds. The result was Where the Pyramid Meets the Eye: A Tribute to Roky Erickson, released on Sire Records, part of the Warner Bros. Records group with which Bentley was then associated. Similarly, in 1999, when Bentley learned that Moby Grape co-founder Skip Spence was seriously ill with cancer and facing mounting medical bills, Bentley again organized a tribute album: More Oar: A Tribute to the Skip Spence Album, released on Birdman Records. In 1992, Bentley was instrumental in restarting the career of Jimmy Scott, acting as executive producer and writing the liner notes for Scott's comeback album, All The Way, which was also released on Sire Records.

Bentley is also notable for his efforts to enhance public appreciation of the contributions of particular artists. For example, he is the executive producer of a retrospective Roky Erickson compilation, I Have Always Been Here Before: The Roky Erickson Anthology (Shout! Factory, 2005) and a tribute album to Doug Sahm, Keep Your Soul: A Tribute to Doug Sahm (Vanguard, 2009), recorded and released nearly ten years after Sahm's death. Similarly, Bentley was associated with the 1992 compilation of O.V. Wright material, Soul of O.V. Wright, released 12 years after Wright's death, at the age of 41.

Bentley was with Warner Bros. Records from 1986 to 2006, at which point he became the personal public relations representative of Neil Young, as well as the chief executive officer of Sonic Boomers Inc., an internet-based music news and information site, modeled "as something like Pitchfork Media for the older set, or maybe something like No Depression on the Web." He also became the A & R Director at Vanguard Records, where his first signing was Merle Haggard. He joined Concord Records's A&R department in 2015, and was A&R director for Alejandro Escovedo's Burn Something Beautiful release. He also co-produced the 6-CD set Otis Redding Live at the Whisky a Go Go: The Complete Recordings. Bentley remains a longtime contributor of music reviews and music articles to the Austin Chronicle. and writes the monthly reviews column "Bentley's Bandstand" at www.americanahighways.org.

Bentley's first book, Smithsonian Rock & Roll: Live and Unseen, was published by Smithsonian Books in October 2017. He is presently writing for Neil Young Archives, and started Water Bros. Films in 2019. The company is developing a documentary on longtime music manager Elliot Roberts (Joni Mitchell, Neil Young, Geffen-Roberts Management, Bob Dylan, Tom Petty and others), who died in 2019. Bentley produced a second tribute album for the late singer Roky Erickson, titled May the Circle Remain Unbroken, released by Light in the Attic Records July 2021. Bill Bentley also produced the Lou Reed tribute album The Power of the Heart, released by Light in the Attic Records on April 20, 2024, featuring Keith Richards, Rufus Wainwright, Rickie Lee Jones and other artists.

== Selected credits ==
- 1989 Joe "King" Carrasco and The Crowns Joe "King" Carrasco (Stiff/Tornado) Liner Notes, Reissue Producer
- 1990 Where the Pyramid Meets the Eye: A Tribute to Roky Erickson Various Artists (Sire) Liner Notes, Executive Producer, Album Supervision
- 1992 All the Way Jimmy Scott (Sire) Liner Notes, Executive Producer
- 1994 Words + Music Ry Cooder (Warner Bros./Reprise) Interviewer
- 1996 4 Aces Texas Tornados (Reprise) Executive Producer
- 1997 Little Bit Is Better Than Nada: The Nada Mixes Texas Tornados (Reprise) Executive Producer
- 1997 Live on Letterman: Music from the Late Show Various Artists (Reprise) Producer, Associate Producer
- 1999 More Oar: A Tribute to the Skip Spence Album Various Artists (Birdman) Producer, Liner Notes
- 2004 Animal Serenade Lou Reed (RCA) Executive Producer

Concord Music:

- 2016 Live at the Whisky a Go Go: The Complete Recordings Otis Redding, Co-Producer (Stax Records)
- 2016.Burn Something Beautiful Alejandro Escovedo, A&R (Fantasy Records)

Light in the Attic Records:

- 2021 May the Circle Remain Unbroken: A Tribute to Roky Erickson, Album Producer
- 2024 The Power of the Heart: A Tribute to Lou Reed, Album Producer

Smithsonian Books:

- 2017 Smithsonian Rock & Roll: Live and Unseen by Bill Bentley (October 24, 2017)
