= All That May Do My Rhyme =

Studio album by Roky Erickson
- Released: 1995
- Recorded: 10/93–4/94
- Studio: Arlyn, Austin
- Genre: Folk rock, roots rock
- Label: Trance Syndicate
- Producer: Speedy Sparks, Stuart Sullivan, Casey Monahan

Roky Erickson chronology
Beauty and the Beast (1993)	All That May Do My Rhyme (1995)	Demon Angel: A Day and a Night with Roky Erickson (1995)

All That May Do My Rhyme is an album by the American musician Roky Erickson. It was released in 1995 on Trance Syndicate Records, an independent record label founded in 1990 by King Coffey, drummer of Austin, Texas, band the Butthole Surfers.

The album was a packaging of new songs with ones issued on the 1985 Clear Night for Love EP (tracks 3, 5, 9–11). An unlisted track, "We Sell Soul", is a 1965 song by Erickson's band the Spades. All That May Do My Rhyme was Erickson's first studio album in about a decade.

== Production ==
The album was produced by Speedy Sparks, Stuart Sullivan, and Casey Monahan. Paul Leary, Barry "Frosty" Smith, and Charlie Sexton contributed to All That May Do My Rhyme. Lou Ann Barton sang on one of the two versions of "Starry Eyes". Sumner Erickson, Roky's brother, played tuba on the album. The album was released at the same time as a book, Openers II: The Lyrics of Roky Erickson, that collected Erickson's poems and lyrics.

== Critical reception ==
Professional ratings
Review scores
Source	Rating
AllMusic	3/5 stars
Chicago Tribune	3.5/4 stars
The Encyclopedia of Popular Music	3/5 stars
MusicHound Rock: The Essential Album Guide	4/5 stars
Lincoln Journal Star	3.5/5 stars
Record Collector	3/5 stars
Rolling Stone	3.5/5 stars
Spin Alternative Record Guide	8/10

Rolling Stone determined that, "if Erickson covers a lot of territory, it is because his music has always functioned as a living archive of musical form, exploring the seams between supposedly incongruous genres." The Boston Globe wrote that "Erickson looks at loves lost and sought in ballads given a light, melodic touch." The Austin American-Statesman deemed the album "arguably his most accessible and listener-friendly to date, with the sort of buoyant melodicism, lyrical invention and shimmering jangle that the R.E.M. generation can accept as a kindred musical spirit."

The Philadelphia Daily News stated that "the psychedelic pioneer brings his Bob Dylanesque phrasing and charmingly vulnerable voice to a mixed bag of old and new material that focuses more on love than on his past themes of demons and aliens." The Santa Fe New Mexican concluded that "We Are Never Talking" "could almost be mistaken for a long-lost Blood on the Tracks outtake." The Chicago Tribune determined that "best of all is the plaintive 'Please Judge', in which Erickson pleads, 'Don't send or keep the boy away'."

AllMusic wrote that "Roky's most excessive traits are mostly absent; he sounds sort of like an eccentric, updated Buddy Holly." Record Collector thought that his "dishevelled yowl elevates [the songs] into the otherworldly realm, spookily channelling both his fractured mind and convincingly extra-terrestrial soul."

== Track listing ==
No.	Title	Length
1.	"I'm Gonna Free Her"
2.	"Starry Eyes"
3.	"You Don't Love Me Yet"
4.	"Please Judge"
5.	"Don't Slander Me"
6.	"We Are Never Talking"
7.	"For You (I'd Do Anything)"
8.	"For You"
9.	"Clear Night for Love"
10.	"Haunt"
11.	"Starry Eyes"
12.	"We Sell Soul"
