= Roky Erickson =

American musician (1947–2019)

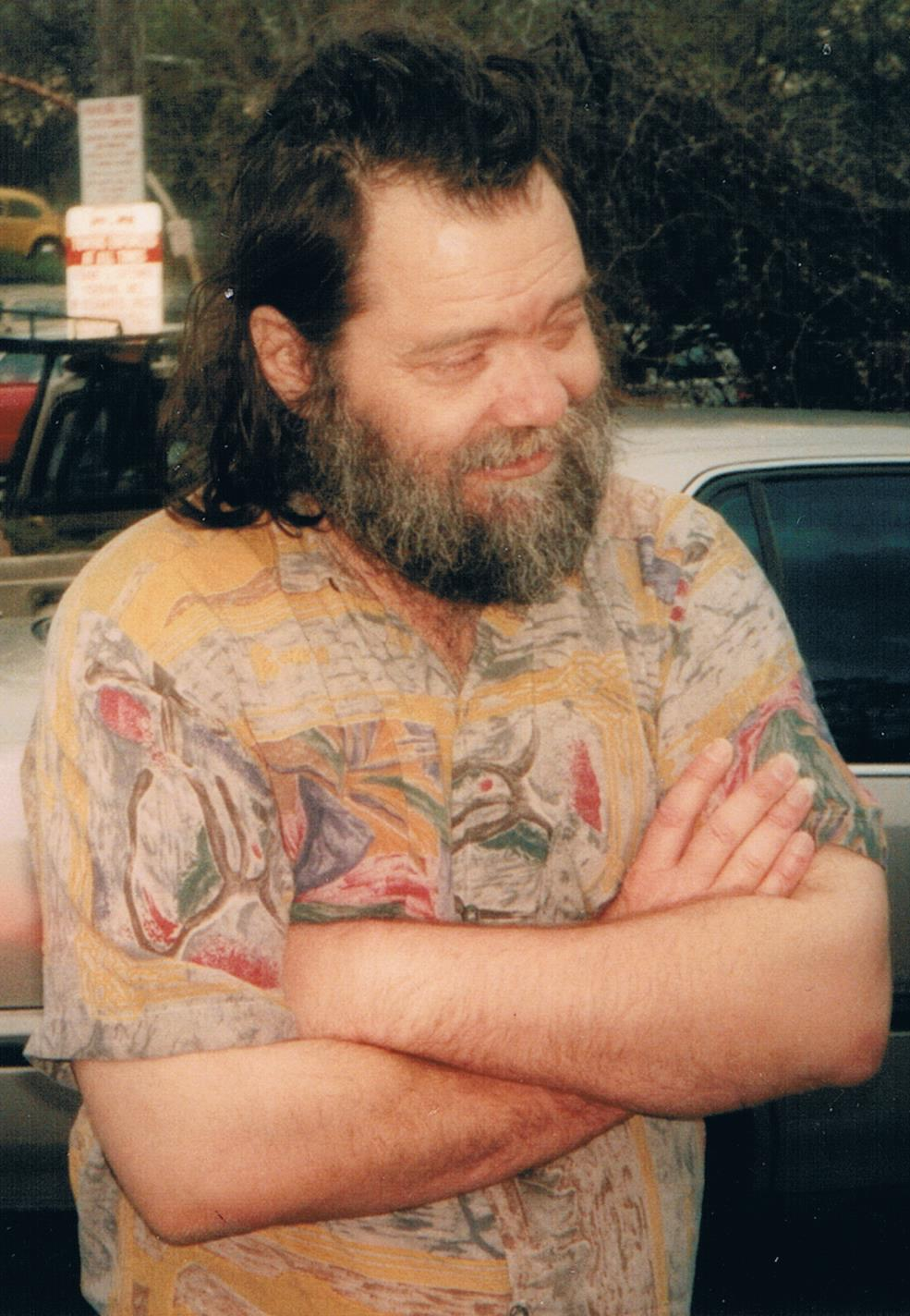
- Erickson in 1995

Background information
- Born: Roger Kynard Erickson; July 15, 1947; Dallas, Texas, U.S.
- Died: May 31, 2019 (aged 71) Austin, Texas, U.S.
- Genres: Psychedelic rock; garage rock; acid rock; horror rock; • roots rock
- Occupations: Musician; singer; songwriter
- Instruments: Guitar; vocals; harmonica; piano
- Years active: 1964–2019
- Labels: Columbia; CBS; Restless; Pink Dust; Enigma Records; Five Hours Back; Fan Club; Sympathy for the Record Industry; Triple X; Emperor Jones; Norton; New Rose; Swordfish
- Formerly of: The Spades; 13th Floor Elevators; Roky Erickson and the Aliens

Roger Kynard "Roky" Erickson (July 15, 1947 – May 31, 2019) was an American musician and singer-songwriter. Called an "outsider genius", he was a founding member and leader of the 13th Floor Elevators, as well as a pioneer of psychedelic rock music during the mid to late 1960s. Additionally, he founded the band Roky Erickson and the Aliens in the late 1970s.

== Biography ==
=== Early life ===
Erickson was born at the Nightingale Hospital in Dallas, Texas, on 15 July 1947 to Roger Laverne Erickson and Evelyn Elaine (Kynard). He had four younger brothers. The nickname "Roky", a contraction of his first and middle names, was given to him by his parents. Though Erickson's father had named his son after himself, Roger did not want Roky to be known as "Roger Junior". His father, an architect and civil engineer, was stern and disapproving of Erickson's countercultural attitudes, once forcibly cutting his son's hair rather than allow him to grow it out Beatles-style. His mother was an amateur artist and opera singer, and encouraged Erickson's musical talent by taking guitar lessons herself so she could teach him.

Interested in music from his youth, he played piano from age five and took up guitar at 10. He attended school in Austin and dropped out of Travis High School in 1965, one month before graduating, rather than cut his hair to conform to the school dress code.

He also acted as a child, and was enrolled in the Civic Children’s Theatre School in Austin from an early age. He appeared in several local productions between 1958-59, including roles as the Mad Hatter in Alice in Wonderland, Sonny in Cat on a Hot Tin Roof and Indian Joe in a dramatization of Tom Sawyer.

Erickson had an early fascination with horror films, and would make unaccompanied trips to the cinema to watch them.

=== The Spades ===
Erickson wrote his first songs, "You're Gonna Miss Me" and "We Sell Soul", at age 15. His first band was The Roulettes, later renamed The Missing Links, before joining The Spades when their original singer left. They would travel round Texas performing at frat events on San Antonio and Dallas. The Spades scored a regional hit with "We Sell Soul", released in November 1965.

The song is included as an unlisted bonus track on Erickson's 1995 album All That May Do My Rhyme and was adapted as "Don't Fall Down" by the 13th Floor Elevators for their debut album.

=== The 13th Floor Elevators ===
In late 1965, at age 18, Erickson co-founded the 13th Floor Elevators. Electric jug player Tommy Hall had introduced him to guitarist Stacy Sutherland, drummer John Ike Walton, and original bassist Benny Thurman, who were all previously members of Texas band The Lingsmen.

At a party in 1966, Erickson met Janis Joplin who was back in Texas between stints in San Francisco, and wrote the line "I’ve seen your face before, I’ve known you all my life" about her. It would be included in the band's song "Splash 1", which was otherwise written by Hall's wife Clementine.

The band released their debut album The Psychedelic Sounds of the 13th Floor Elevators in 1966. It contained the band's only charting single, Erickson's "You're Gonna Miss Me". A stinging breakup song, the single was a major hit on local charts in the U.S. southwest and appeared at lower positions on national singles charts as well. Critic Mark Deming writes that "If Roky Erickson had vanished from the face of the earth after The 13th Floor Elevators released their epochal debut single, "You're Gonna Miss Me", in early 1966, in all likelihood he'd still be regarded as a legend among garage rock fanatics for his primal vocal wailing and feral harmonica work."

In 1967, Erickson appeared on labelmate Red Krayola's debut album The Parable of Arable Land, playing electric organ on "Hurricane Fighter Plane" and harmonica on "Transparent Radiation".

The same year, The 13th Floor Elevators released their second album, Easter Everywhere, perhaps the band's most focused effort. It featured "Slip Inside This House", and a noted cover of Bob Dylan's "It's All Over Now, Baby Blue". The album Live was released in 1968 by the band's record label International Artists, with little to no input from the band. It featured audience applause dubbed over studio recordings of cover versions, alternate takes, and older material.

Bull of the Woods (1969) was the 13th Floor Elevators' final album on which they worked as a group and was largely the work of Stacy Sutherland. Erickson—due to health and legal problems—and Tommy Hall were only involved with a few tracks, including "Livin' On" and "May the Circle Remain Unbroken".

=== Mental illness and legal problems ===
In 1968, while performing at HemisFair, Erickson began speaking gibberish. He was diagnosed with paranoid schizophrenia and sent to a Houston psychiatric hospital, where he involuntarily received electroconvulsive therapy.

The Elevators were vocal proponents of marijuana and psychedelic drug use, and were subject to extra attention from law enforcement agencies. In February 1969, Erickson was arrested for possession of a single marijuana joint in Austin. Facing a potential ten-year incarceration, Erickson pleaded not guilty by reason of insanity to avoid prison. He was bailed but became a fugitive, returning to Austin to play a comeback show in August, where he was arrested onstage after completing his first set. A riot ensued, during which two police cars were trashed, as enraged fans tried to protect Erickson from the police. After several escapes, he was sent to the Rusk State Hospital in Rusk, Texas, where he was subjected to more electroconvulsive therapy and Thorazine treatments, ultimately remaining in custody until 1972.

During his time at Rusk, he continued writing songs and poetry. Family and friends managed to smuggle some of these poems, and in 1972, self-published the book Openers, intending to use the proceeds to hire a lawyer. (Various sources claim approximately 1,000 copies of Openers were printed; how many copies were actually sold remains unknown.) Six tracks from the 1999 Erickson collection Never Say Goodbye were also recorded during his time at Rusk.

=== Roky Erickson and The Aliens ===
In 1974, after having been released from the state hospital, Erickson formed a new band which he called "Bleib Alien". Bleib being an anagram of Bible, and/or German for "remain", and "Alien" being a pun on the German word allein ("alone") – the phrase in German, therefore, being "remain alone". His new band exchanged the psychedelic sounds of The 13th Floor Elevators for a more hard rock sound that featured lyrics on old horror film and science fiction themes.

The band's other members were Billy Miller (playing an adapted electric autoharp), Hugh Patton (drums) and Mike Richey (bass). They played their first proper show at the opening of the Austin Ritz on April 25, 1975. The night was also the opening of the Texas Film Festival, with Tobe Hooper as guest and a screening of Texas Chainsaw Massacre.

After guesting with The Sir Douglas Quintet for three dates at the Palamino Club in North Hollywood in July 1975, Erickson persuaded their manager Craig Luckin to manage him also. Returning to Austin that August for a four-hour recording session at Pecan Street Studios, the Blieb Alien lineup recorded "Two Headed Dog (Red Temple Prayer)" (produced by The Sir Douglas Quintet's Doug Sahm and inspired by Vladimir Demikhov's 1950s head transplant experiments). It was released as a single in 1976.

In San Francisco, where Luckin lived, he and Erickson set about forming a new lineup. This would be Duane Aslaksen on guitar, Morgan Burgess on bass, Jeff Sutton on drums. After five or six shows around the Bay Area, Billy Miller rejoined, and rechristened the band The Aliens. The Aliens released two 7" records in 1977; the single "Bermuda" b/w "The Interpreter" produced by John X Reed, and an EP on the French Sponge label produced by Sutton.

By the end of the year they had begun recording demos with Stu Cook, former bass player of Creedence Clearwater Revival, at his studio space Cosmo's Factory. Jeff Sutton left, to be replaced by John Oxendine, aka Fuzzy Furioso. Recordings produced by Cook would be released in two "overlapping" LPs – Roky Erickson and the Aliens (released in the UK by CBS, 1980) - also called TEO, Five Symbols, or Runes - and The Evil One (415 Records, 1981). In between recording sessions, Erickson was repeatedly slipped drugs by fans at the shows they would play in San Francisco. Luckin had to send Erickson back to Austin where he found himself forcibly hospitalised once again.

Erickson coined the term "horror rock" in 1980, when describing the music of this band.

A year after the release of The Evil One, Erickson's mental health again took a downward turn, believing that a Martian had taken over his body. Peggy Underwood, Erickson's lawyer, had a fake legal contract drawn up for him to sign in public, proclaiming his official status as being an Alien.

In 1984 an observational documentary was produced in Austin for Swedish television, titled Demon Angel: A Day and Night with Roky Erickson. It featured Erickson in plugged and unplugged performances, solo and with local musician/producer Mike Alvarez on additional guitar, in an underground creek beneath the Congress Street Bridge on Halloween. Alvarez later released the film on VHS, updating it with interviews of some of Erickson's friends and relatives; it was toured to several cities including Pittsburgh, where the screening was followed by a set of Erickson covers by Alvarez and others, as well as a performance by the Mount McKinleys with guest vocalist Sumner Erickson (Roky's brother). A soundtrack of the film also was issued on CD, receiving positive reviews.

=== Other backing bands ===
Roky performed with The Nervebreakers as his backup band at The Palladium in Dallas in July 1979. A recording was issued on the French label New Rose and was recently re-issued elsewhere. The Austin-based band the Explosives served as Roky's most frequent back-up band during the early Raul's era, between 1978 and the early 1980s. Billed as Roky Erickson and the Explosives, they were regulars at Raul's, the Continental Club, and other Austin venues. It was this incarnation that contributed two live tracks to the first Live at Raul's LP, released in 1980, with other Raul's top bands: The Skunks, Terminal Mind, The Next, Standing Waves, and The Explosives (without Roky Erickson). The Roky Erickson tracks ("Red Temple Prayer" and "Don't Shake Me Lucifer") were not included on the initial release for contractual reasons, but were included on a later release.

=== First solo albums and renewed interest ===
In 1986 he released Don't Slander Me, of which his manager Luckin has said "I’ve never seen him be so together and sober during those sessions". The same year Gremlins Have Pictures, a selection of live takes ranging from 1975-82, was released. His mental health declined further, he developed an obsession with collecting and cataloguing junk mail, as well as writing countless letters to people. He was arrested for mail theft in 1989, although charges were dropped.

Several live albums of his older material have been released since the mid-1980s, and in 1990 Sire Records/Warner Bros. Records released the tribute album Where the Pyramid Meets the Eye, produced by Bill Bentley. It featured versions of Erickson's songs performed by The Jesus and Mary Chain, R.E.M., ZZ Top, Poi Dog Pondering, Julian Cope, Butthole Surfers, Bongwater, John Wesley Harding, Doug Sahm, and Primal Scream. According to the liner notes, the title of the album came from a remark Erickson made to a friend who asked him to define psychedelic music, to which Erickson reportedly replied "It's where the pyramid meets the eye, man", an apparent reference to the Eye of Providence, which appears on the album cover.

=== Return to music and later life ===
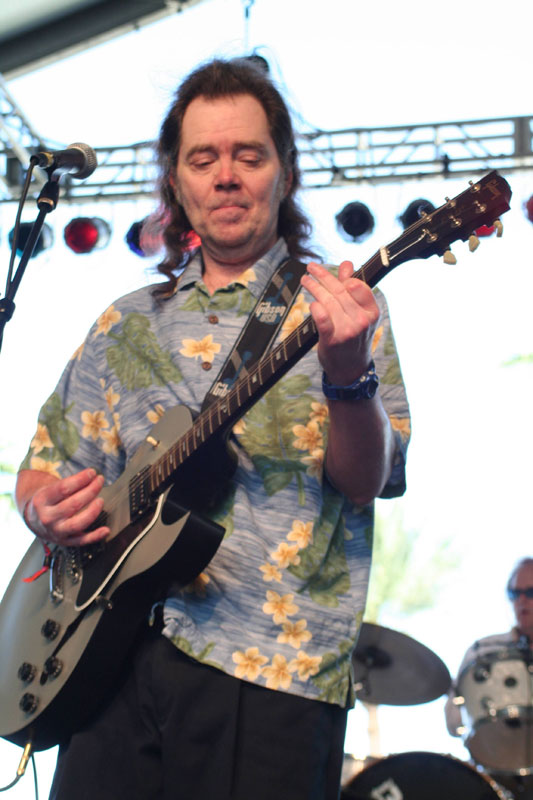
Erickson performing at the 2007 Coachella Valley Music and Arts Festival

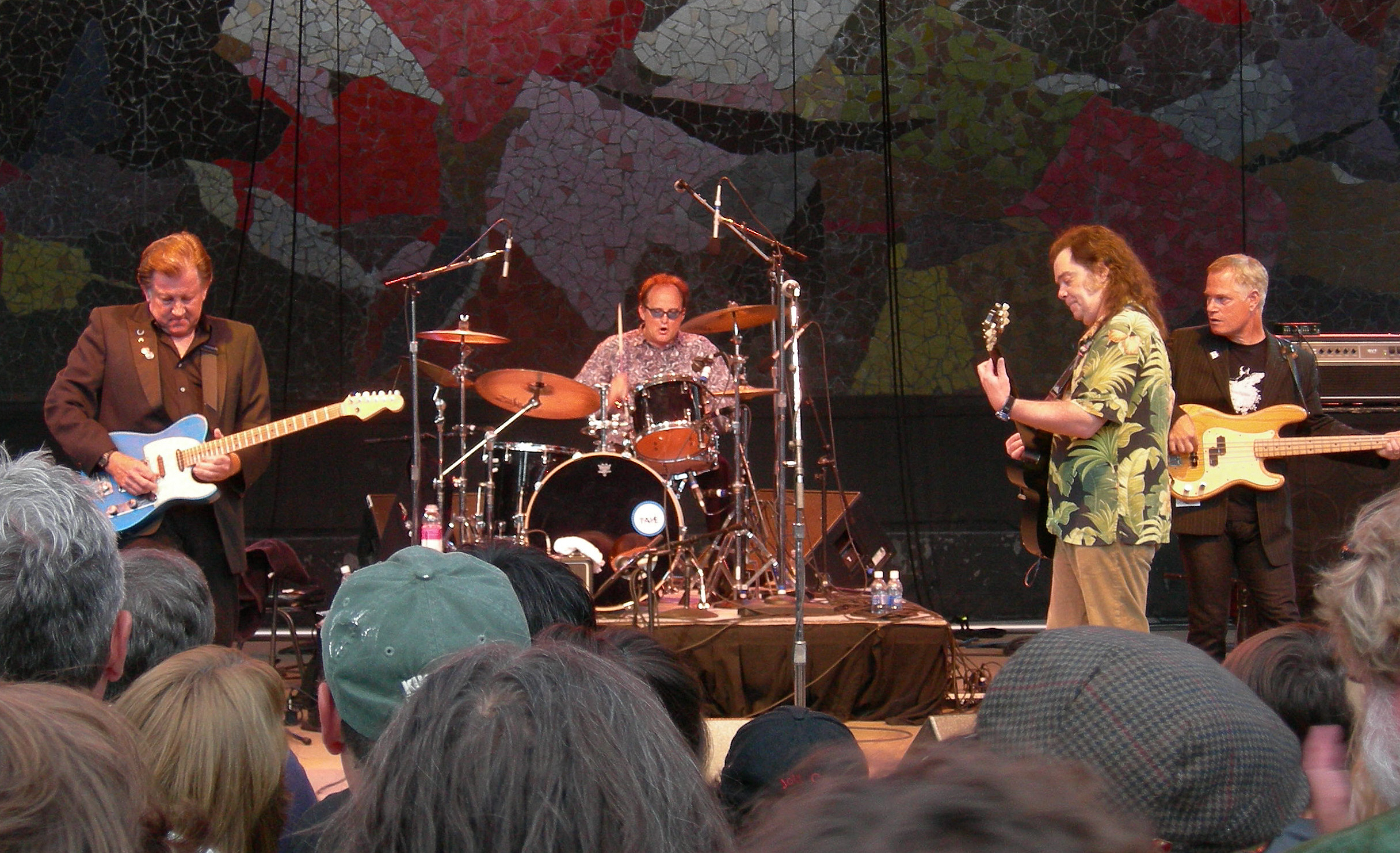
Erickson and the Explosives at Bumbershoot festival (2007)

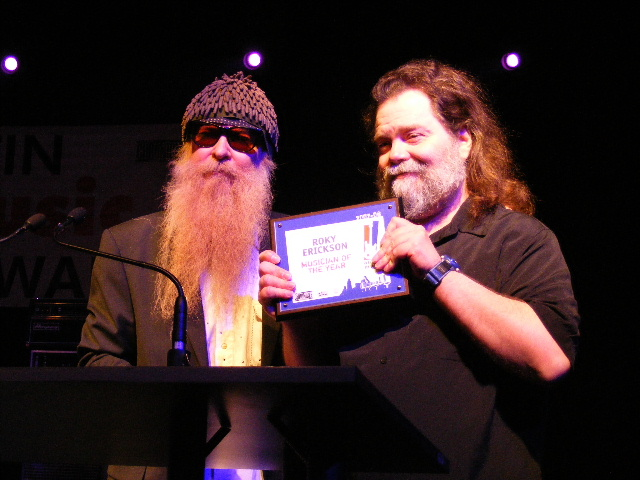
Erickson receiving a lifetime achievement award from Billy Gibbons at the Austin Music Awards (2008)

In 1995, Erickson released All That May Do My Rhyme on Butthole Surfers drummer King Coffey's label Trance Syndicate Records. Produced by Texas Tornados bassist Speedy Sparks, Austin recording legend Stuart Sullivan, and Texas Music Office director Casey Monahan, the release coincided with the publication of Openers II, a complete collection of Erickson's lyrics. Published by Henry Rollins's 2.13.61 Publications, it was compiled and edited by Monahan with assistance from Rollins and Erickson's youngest brother Sumner Erickson, a classical tuba player. All That May Do My Rhyme was reissued in 2017 on black vinyl and CD, and again in 2023 on white vinyl by the Berlin-based label play loud! productions.

Sumner was granted legal custody of Roky in 2001, and established a legal trust to aid his brother. As a result, Roky received some of the most effective medical and legal aid of his life, the latter useful in helping sort out the complicated tangle of contracts that had reduced royalty payments to all but nothing for his recorded works. He also started taking medication to better manage his schizophrenia.

A documentary film on the life of Roky Erickson titled You're Gonna Miss Me was made by director Keven McAlester and screened at the 2005 SXSW film festival. In September of the same year, Erickson performed his first full-length concert in 20 years at the annual Austin City Limits Music Festival with The Explosives with special guest and longtime associate Billy Gibbons of ZZ Top.

In the December 30, 2005, issue of the Austin Chronicle, an alternative weekly newspaper in Austin, Texas, Margaret Moser chronicled Erickson's recovery, stating that Erickson had weaned himself off his medication, played at 11 gigs in Austin that year, obtained a driver's license, bought a car, and voted.

In 2007, Erickson played his first ever gigs in New York City at Southpaw in Brooklyn, NY, as well as California's Coachella Festival and made a debut performance in England to a capacity audience at the Royal Festival Hall, London. Roky continued to play in Europe, performing for the first time in Finland at Ruisrock festival. The performance was widely considered the highlight of the festival day.

On September 8, 2008, Scottish post-rock band Mogwai released the Batcat EP. Erickson is featured on "Devil Rides". Erickson performed alongside Austin-based indie rock band Okkervil River at the Austin Music Awards in 2008 and then again at the 2009 South by Southwest music festival.

Erickson returned to the stage in 2008 to perform songs from the 13th Floor Elevators catalog that had not been performed in decades with fellow Austinites The Black Angels as his backing band. They performed a show in Dallas followed by a West Coast tour. The Black Angels played a regular set and then backed Erickson as his rhythm section, playing 13th Floor Elevators songs as well as songs from Erickson's solo albums.

On April 20, 2010, Erickson released True Love Cast Out All Evil, his first album of new material in 14 years. Okkervil River serves as Erickson's backing band on the album.

In March 2012 Erickson toured New Zealand and Australia for the first time headlining Golden Plains Festival in Meredith, Victoria and playing sold-out side shows in Sydney and Melbourne.

On May 10, 2015, he performed with the reunited 13th Floor Elevators at Levitation (formerly Austin Psych Fest, the event was renamed "Levitation" after the song of the same title). The band consisted of original band members Erickson, Tommy Hall, John Ike Walton, and Ronnie Leatherman, joined by Roky's son Jegar Erickson on harmonica, Roky's lead guitarist Eli Southard, and rhythm guitarist Fred Mitchim. On October 7, 2018, Erickson performed outdoors to an audience of thousands at the Hardly Strictly Bluegrass Festival in San Francisco.

== Death ==
Erickson died in Austin on May 31, 2019. His death was made public through a Facebook post by his brother Mikel, who wrote "My brother Roky passed away peaceably today. Please allow us time." No cause of death was announced.

== Discography ==
- Red Temple Prayer (Two Headed Dog) / Starry Eyes [as "R.Ericson and Bliebalien"] (1975, Mars Records)
- Mine, Mine, Mind (1977, EP, Sponge)
- Bermuda / The Interpreter (1977, Virgin [UK]/Rhino [USA])
- "Burn the Flames" (1985, Return of the Living Dead)
- Clear Night For Love (1985, EP, New Rose)
- Don't Slander Me (1986)
- Gremlins Have Pictures (1986)
- Casting the Runes (Roky Erickson & The Explosives, 1987)
- Holiday Inn Tapes (1987)
- Click Your Fingers Applauding The Play (1988)
- Openers (1988)
- Live at the Ritz 1987 (1988)
- Live Dallas 1979 (1992)
- All That May Do My Rhyme (1995)
- Demon Angel: A Day and a Night with Roky Erickson (1995)
- Roky Erickson and Evilhook Wildlife (1995)
- Never Say Goodbye (1999)
- Don't Knock the Rok! (2004)
- I Have Always Been Here Before (2005)
- Halloween (2008)
- True Love Cast Out All Evil (2010)

Roky Erickson and the Aliens

- Roky Erickson and the Aliens (1980)
- The Evil One (1981)

Roky Erickson and the Resurrectionists

- Beauty and the Beast (1993)

Tribute albums

- Where the Pyramid Meets the Eye (1990)
- We're Gonna Miss You: A Tribute to Roky Erickson (2020)
- May the Circle Remain Unbroken: A Tribute to Roky Erickson (2021)

== Filmography ==
- Demon Angel: A Day and Night with Roky Erickson (1984)
- You're Gonna Miss Me (2005)

== Legacy and influence ==
The 1980s post-punk band Red Temple Spirits chose their name in honor of Erickson's song "Two Headed Dog (Red Temple Prayer)."

Author Jonathan Lethem titled his 2007 novel You Don't Love Me Yet in honor of two (otherwise unconnected) songs of the same title by Erickson and The Vulgar Boatmen. Lethem called Erickson's song "irresistible" and "one of those incredibly versatile songs."

The X-Files episode "Jose Chung's From Outer Space" features a character named Roky Crikenson in homage to Erickson. Crikenson, like the original Roky, believes himself to be an alien abductee.

A plotline in an episode of 1990s sitcom The John Larroquette Show revolved around a sighting of reclusive novelist Thomas Pynchon. Pynchon did not appear, but agreed to allow his name to be used on the condition that it was specifically mentioned that Pynchon was seen wearing a T-shirt showing a picture of Erickson. This spurred an increase in sales of Erickson's albums.

The album It's Spooky by Daniel Johnston and Jad Fair features the song "I Met Roky Erickson", named after an encounter Johnston had with the artist.

If You Have Ghost is the first EP by Swedish rock band Ghost. It was produced by Dave Grohl and released on 20 November 2013 by Republic Records. The first track is a cover of "If You Have Ghosts" as tribute to Roky Erickson. Ghost also included a live version on their musical film Rite Here Rite Now in 2024.

True Love Cast Out All Evil: The Songwriting Legacy of Roky Erickson by author Brian T. Atkinson was released by Texas A&M University Press in 2021. The book includes forewords by ZZ Top's Billy Gibbons and legendary punk rock icon Henry Rollins.
