= May the Circle Remain Unbroken: A Tribute to Roky Erickson =

2021 tribute album to Roky Erickson

Compilation album by various artists
- Released: July 17, 2021
- Genre: Psychedelic rock
- Length: 44:04
- Label: Light in the Attic
- Producer: Bill Bentley

Various artists chronology
Where the Pyramid Meets the Eye: A Tribute to Roky Erickson (1999)	May the Circle Remain Unbroken: A Tribute to Roky Erickson (2021)

May the Circle Remain Unbroken: A Tribute to Roky Erickson is an album by various artists, released July 17, 2021, on indie record label Light in the Attic. It is the first posthumous tribute album for Erickson (who died in 2019) and is produced by Bill Bentley, who also assembled the 1990 Erickson tribute album Where the Pyramid Meets the Eye for Sire Records.

It was an exclusive Record Store Day vinyl release, and was also released digitally and on CD.

Artists featured on the album include ZZ Top's Billy Gibbons; Charlie Sexton and Alison Mosshart (as Mosshart Sexton); Jeff Tweedy of Wilco; Neko Case; Gary Clark Jr. and Eve Monsees; and Lucinda Williams. The songs are drawn from Erickson's time with Texas psychedelic rock group the 13th Floor Elevators and his subsequent solo career.

== Reception ==
May the Circle Remain Unbroken: A Tribute to Roky Erickson ratings
Review scores
Source	Rating
American Songwriter	4.5/5 stars
Cover Me	3.5/5 stars
Mojo	4/5 stars

Early critical reaction to the album was positive. In Mojo, Stevie Chick said some of the artists' interpretations suffered from their reverence for the source material, but added: "The more radical reimaginings fare better, like Alison Mosshart and Charlie Sexton redressing 'Starry Eyes' as a reverb-drenched '50s ballad, or The Black Angels recasting 'Don't Fall Down' as a lo-fi Velvets lullaby, or Chelsea Wolfe delivering 'If You Have Ghosts' as yearning, widescreen piano-ballad".

Hal Horowitz suggested in American Songwriter that "perhaps this can be an ongoing project. Erickson's largely unheard catalog, both solo and with the Elevators, deserves the attention".

In the Austin American-Statesman, Peter Blackstock compared the new tribute album with the old, describing its feel as "more underground than its comparatively flashier predecessor. That makes it perhaps a harder sell for a broad audience, but it may resonate more deeply with hardcore Erickson fans who appreciate the participants' willingness to immerse themselves in Roky's otherworldly realm".

Writing in Cover Me, a publication covering cover songs, Seuras Og similarly made an A/B comparison, describing May the Circle Remain Unbroken as a mix of "simpatico recreations and righteous reenvisionings" that "hangs together better" than Where the Pyramid Meets the Eye.

== Track listing ==
All tracks are written by Roky Erickson.

May the Circle Remain Unbroken: A Tribute to Roky Erickson track listing
No.	Title	Covering artist(s)	Length
1.	"(I've Got) Levitation"	Billy F Gibbons	2:55
2.	"Starry Eyes"	Mosshart Sexton	5:10
3.	"For You (I'd Do Anything)"	Jeff Tweedy	2:26
4.	"Clear Night for Love"	Lynn Castle & Mark Lanegan	2:44
5.	"Don't Fall Down"	The Black Angels	4:22
6.	"Be and Bring Me Home"	Neko Case	4:23
7.	"Red Temple Prayer (Two-Headed Dog)"	Margo Price	3:22
8.	"Roller Coaster"	Gary Clark Jr. & Eve Monsees	4:10
9.	"Night of the Vampire"	Ty Segall	3:53
10.	"You're Gonna Miss Me"	Lucinda Williams	2:38
11.	"If You Have Ghosts"	Chelsea Wolfe	4:45
12.	"May the Circle Remain Unbroken"	Brogan Bentley	3:10
Total length:			44:04

Bonus RSD-Only Flexi Disc

- Roky Erickson — Love Hieroglyphics
