= Keep Your Soul: A Tribute to Doug Sahm =

Studio album by Various Artists
- Released: March 24, 2009
- Recorded: 2008 and 2009
- Genre: Rock, Tex-Mex
- Label: Vanguard
- Producer: Bill Bentley; Stephen Brower; David Katznelson; Shawn Sahm

Keep Your Soul: A Tribute to Doug Sahm is a 2009 tribute album to the late Doug Sahm, released on Vanguard Records.

== History and critical reception ==
Professional ratings
Review scores
Source	Rating
AllMusic	3.5/5 stars
The Austin Chronicle	4/5 stars
Entertainment Weekly	B+
Los Angeles Times	3/4 stars
PopMatters	7/10

Sahm died of a heart attack, in Taos, New Mexico, on November 18, 1999, twelve days after his 58th birthday. As co-producer Bill Bentley recalls, "Shawn Sahm and I tried to do a tribute album right after Doug Sahm died in 1999, but it was just too soon. Ten years later, we found a partner in Vanguard Records, through David Katznelson, and it all fell together."

The album, described as "a warm evocation of Sahm's spirit and sensibility, how he effortlessly encompassed almost every element of Texan music", was favourably reviewed:

Bookended by Sir Doug's two best-known songs — "She's About a Mover", here performed by Little Willie G., the vocalist for Thee Midniters and Malo, supported by Ry Cooder among others, and "Mendocino," performed by Sahm's son Shawn...(t)he order of the day isn't reinterpretation, it's celebration, and there are many joyful performances here, highlighted by Los Lobos' relaxed, breezy "It Didn't Even Bring Me Down", Delbert McClinton's easy-rolling "Texas Me", Jimmie Vaughan's glorious slow crawl through "Why, Why, Why" (and) Joe "King" Carrasco's rollicking "Adios Mexico" supported by the Texas Tornados...

According to another reviewer,

...it would be difficult to imagine a more deserving candidate (for a tribute album) than Doug Sahm. ...Sahm’s vision, which coupled the tangled roots of rock ‘n’ roll with the rhythms and spirit of Tex-Mex, is both broad enough to facilitate the tributes of a diverse range of artists, and specific enough to make it all hang together. ...As a tribute album, this set does the intended work of sending us back to the original recordings with fresh ears—and that may well be the best possible measure of its success.

== Track listing ==
1. She's About a Mover - Little Willie G.
2. It Didn't Even Bring Me Down - Los Lobos
3. Too Little Too Late - Alejandro Escovedo
4. You Was For Real - Greg Dulli
5. Dynamite Woman - Dave Alvin
6. Ta Bueno Compadre (It's OK Friend) - Flaco Jiménez with the West Side Horns
7. Texas Me - Delbert McClinton
8. I'm Not That Kat Anymore - Terry Allen
9. Why, Why, Why - Jimmie Vaughan
10. You're Doin' It Too Hard - Charlie Sexton & the Mystic Knights of the Sea
11. Nuevo Laredo - The Gourds
12. Be Real - Freda & the Firedogs
13. Adios Mexico - Joe "King" Carrasco & Texas Tornados
14. Mendocino - Shawn Sahm
15. I Wanna Be Your Mama Again Sarah Borges and The Broken Singles
