= More Oar: A Tribute to the Skip Spence Album =

Compilation album by Various Artists
- Released: July 6, 1999
- Recorded: 1999
- Genre: Rock
- Label: Birdman
- Producer: Bill Bentley

Various Artists chronology
Oar (1969)	More Oar: A Tribute to the Skip Spence Album (1999)

More Oar: A Tribute to the Skip Spence Album is a 1999 tribute album completed shortly before and released shortly after the death of Moby Grape founding member Skip Spence. The album contains cover versions by various artists of Spence's music from his Oar album, released in 1969, presented in the same order as on the original album. The album also contains a hidden bonus track of Spence's last known recording, "Land of the Sun", which was originally commissioned for the X-Files soundtrack, Songs in the Key of X, but not used.

== History and critical reaction ==
The album was planned and produced by Bill Bentley, a music industry executive then associated with Warner Bros. Records, who had previously produced Where the Pyramid Meets the Eye: A Tribute to Roky Erickson (Warner Bros. Records/Sire, 1990).

More Oar has been described as a "heartfelt, eclectic homage" that "pays tribute to one of psychedelia's brightest lights, Skip Spence." In relation to the inclusion of Spence's "Land of the Sun" as a hidden bonus track, critic Raoul Hernandez commented:

...(i)t's Spence himself, who died at the age of 52...who saves the back end of More Oar with the mumbled, spacey, bongo madness of "Land of the Sun." A hidden bonus track deemed unworthy of 1996's X-Files spinoff, Songs in the Key of X, "Land of the Sun" brings More Oar full circle...(to) bookend an obscure chapter of rock & roll history that is finally becoming public record."

Critic Rob Brunner views the more successful covers as being those by artists with a particular appreciation of Spence's spirit.

== Track listing ==
1. "Little Hands" - Robert Plant 4:22
2. "Cripple Creek" - Mark Lanegan 2:12
3. "Diana" - Alejandro Escovedo 4:08
4. "Margaret/Tiger-Rug" - The Dūrocs 2:27
5. "Weighted Down (The Prison Song)" - Jay Farrar & The Sir Omaha Quintet
6. "War In Peace" - Mudhoney 3:15
7. "Broken Heart" - Robyn Hitchcock 3:48
8. "All Come To Meet Her" - Diesel Park West 4:06
9. "Books Of Moses" - Tom Waits 3:01
10. "Dixie Peach Promenade (Yin For Yang)" - Greg Dulli 3:03
11. "Lawrence Of Euphoria" - The Ophelias 1:40
12. "Grey - Afro" - Flying Saucer Attack 4:24
13. "This Time He Has Come" - Alastair Galbraith 5:18
14. "It's The Best Thing For You" - Engine 54 5:02
15. "Keep Everything Under Your Hat" - Outrageous Cherry 3:18
16. "Halo Of Gold" - Beck 4:32
17. "Doodle" Minus 5 - 13:18
18. "Land of the Sun" - Skip Spence (hidden track)

== Credits ==
- David Katznelson Executive Producer
- Bill Bentley Producer, Liner Notes
- Stanley Mouse Artwork
- Jimmy Hole Artwork, Art Direction
- André Knect Mastering
