= Don't Slander Me =

1986 album by Roky Erickson

Studio album by Roky Erickson
- Released: 1986
- Recorded: 1982 or 1983
- Genres: Psychedelic rock, garage rock, punk rock, power pop
- Length: 46:55
- Label: Pink Dust
- Producer: Duane Aslaksen

Roky Erickson chronology
| Roky Erickson & The Aliens (The Evil One) (1981) | Don't Slander Me (1986) | Gremlins Have Pictures (1986) |

Don't Slander Me is an album by the American musician Roky Erickson, recorded in 1982 or 1983 and released in 1986. Bassist Jack Casady performs on the album as part of Erickson's backing band.

The recording of the album took two months, from May 14 to July 16, 1982. The song "Burn the Flames", recorded on the last day, was featured on the soundtrack for the 1985 horror movie The Return of the Living Dead. "Haunt" would later appear in the 1999 film Boys Don't Cry.

A different version of the title track came out as a single in 1984, with a new version of Erickson's "Starry Eyes" on its B-side.

== Background ==
After recording his album The Evil One with California-based band the Aliens in 1979, Roky Erickson was released from Austin State Hospital where he had been held several years for psychiatric treatment. He went into the care of his mother.

Staying in Texas, Erickson enlisted a number of local punk rock acts to be his backing band: first a couple of pickup gigs with the Reversible Cords and Sterling Morrison's group the Bizarrors, then more extensively with Austin bands the Explosives and the Resurrectionists, as well as the Nervebreakers in Dallas. The material they played largely drew from the Aliens' arrangements of songs from The Evil One and the handful of Erickson's 1970s singles that had preceded the album, plus a couple of hits by Erickson’s early group 13th Floor Elevators and material from Erickson's larger body of unreleased songs. Of these bands, the Explosives would stick with Erickson the longest, touring behind him through 1981 until they could no longer tolerate the singer's erratic behavior due to deteriorating mental health.

A new lineup of the Aliens were playing in the Bay Area. The drummer, D.H. Peligro, left to join the Dead Kennedys and was replaced by Paul Zahl of Tuxedomoon and the Flamin' Groovies. Band manager Craig Luckin eventually reunited the core of the group to record a follow-up to The Evil One, with Erickson on vocals and guitar, Billy Miller on electric autoharp, Motown artist Andre "Mandré" Lewis on keyboards, and lead guitarist Duane Aslaksen handling musical arrangements and production as Stu Cook had on the previous album. Zahl also recruited bassist Jack Casady, his former bandmate in SVT bandmate and early member of Jefferson Airplane.

The basic tracks and overdubs were done at Site Studios in San Rafael, California. The recording process went smoothly and quickly in comparison to the previous album's long, difficult, and often interrupted sessions. Originally titled Burn the Flames, CBS UK funded the album's recording, planning to release the record as a follow-up to their 1980 Roky Erickson and the Aliens/TEO album, but upon hearing the finished product, CBS executives balked. Luckin managed to secure CBS's funding, but was forced to shop the record to a new buyer.

In the interim, Erickson had backup bands for live gigs, including a reunited version of the 13th Floor Elevators. In 1984 he recorded five songs with a group of Austin-based musicians fronted by producer Speedy Sparks, including three tracks that he'd done for the unreleased Burn the Flames album. Two of these saw release as the single "Don't Slander Me" b/w "Starry Eyes" that year for Sparks' tiny Dynamic Records label, followed by the full five-song Clear Night for Love EP on French label New Rose in 1985. In 1986, Enigma Records subsidiary Pink Dust eventually picked up the Burn the Flames album three years after it was recorded, releasing it as Don't Slander Me alongside a repackaged compact disc of The Evil One and the live compilation Gremlins Have Pictures culled from seven years worth of Erickson backed up by his various bands. Demon Records issued Don't Slander Me in the U.S., added three tracks from The Evil One's session not previously available outside the U.S.

== Songs ==
Many songs on Don't Slander Me were in Erickson's live sets for several years. He had been performing "Bermuda," "Can't Be Brought Down," "Starry Eyes," and the album's title track as early as 1975 with his band Blieb Alien, and then the Aliens, Nervebreakers, and Explosives. An early Blieb Alien version of "Starry Eyes" had been a local country radio staple when it first appeared as a B-side in 1975, and the Aliens' first recording of "Bermuda" made waves within the punk movement as a single in 1977. A version of "Can't Be Brought Down" was recorded for The Evil One but never finished.

Although the album contains spooky, sinister, and vampiric songs like "Burn the Flames," "Haunt," and the re-recorded "Bermuda," Don't Slander Me marks a departure from the pure horror rock of The Evil One. A new version of "Starry Eyes" inserts itself as a sentimental love song while the both "You Drive Me Crazy" and "Nothing in Return" show Erickson returning to his rockabilly roots of Buddy Holly fandom.

== Reception ==
Professional ratings
Review scores
| Source | Rating |
|---|---|
| AllMusic | 3.5/5 stars |
| The Austin Chronicle | 4/5 stars |
| Robert Christgau | B+ |
| The Encyclopedia of Popular Music | 2/5 stars |
| Pitchfork | 7.9/10 |
| The Rolling Stone Album Guide | 3/5 stars |
| Spin Alternative Record Guide | 6/10 |

Upon its release, Don't Slander Me garnered mixed reviews. The Village Voice's Robert Christgau called it "a garage rant about blues theology" and said that the album "sounds like a bunch of would-be old farts (with genuine article Jack Casady lending a touch of authenticity) latching onto the old wildman for the kind of magic carpet ride other music lovers only collect." Ira Robbins' 1987 New Music Record Guide called it "typically gripping," adding that, "the inclusion of two [Buddy] Holly-inspired pop tunes makes for a bizarrare contrast to "Burn the Flames." In a 1988 column for Spin, underground music critic Byron Coley dedicated a page to reviewing a roundup of several Erickson releases that were flooding the market. While praising most of them, he called Don't Slander Me "Roky's least satisfying effort ever," saying that it was "a bland, bored set of tunes." The Los Angeles Times noted, "There's a menacing edginess underlying some of the tunes—for all the bouncy garage-rock spunk of the title track, you wouldn`t want to ignore its repeated warning."

In retrospective reviews, Austin Chronicle writer Scott Schinder called Erickson's 1980s albums, released after his half-decade involuntary stay in a Texas psychiatric hospital, "the clearest glimpse into his raging musical soul." He described Don't Slander Me as more ragged and less focused than Erickson's previous album, 1981's The Evil One, but a grabber nonetheless, anchored by such classics as 'Bermuda' and the title track, and revealing a romantic edge in the Buddy Holly pastiches 'Starry Eyes' and 'Nothin' in Return.'" Pitchfork reviewer Jason Heller said that Don’t Slander Me's "cleanliness and control ... makes for a more palatable but less vital Erickson" than on the 1981 disc The Evil One, but that its mix of "souped-up garage rock" and "ringing, jangly " power-pop were still powerful, calling the song "Burn the Flames" "good, clean, Halloweenish fun".

After Erickson's death, Billboard writer Morgan Enos called Don't Slander Me Erickson's "attempt to embrace the punk era," and praised the love song "Starry Eyes" as "a heartfelt jangler worthy of the Byrds. It proved Erickson’s music stretched far beyond horror-show tomfoolery: like his hero Buddy Holly, he was a consummate melodic master, and he could write ballads with the best of them." Mark Deming of AllMusic called the album "one of Erickson's strongest rock albums, with his voice sharp as a switchblade... While Erickson was at the height of his legendary eccentricity when Don't Slander Me was recorded, this album sounds passionate, focused, and coherent on all tracks."

== Track listing ==
All tracks are written by Roky Erickson.

Side one
| No. | Title | Length |
|---|---|---|
| 1. | "Don't Slander Me" | 3:25 |
| 2. | "Haunt" | 2:50 |
| 3. | "Crazy Crazy Mama" | 2:04 |
| 4. | "Nothing in Return" | 2:50 |
| 5. | "Burn the Flames" | 6:09 |

Side two
| No. | Title | Length |
|---|---|---|
| 6. | "Bermuda" | 3:12 |
| 7. | "You Drive Me Crazy" | 2:30 |
| 8. | "Can't Be Brought Down" | 5:02 |
| 9. | "Starry Eyes" | 3:07 |
| 10. | "The Damn Thing" | 4:57 |

=== Bonus tracks ===
Added to the 1987 UK LP release on Demon Records

Side one
| No. | Title | Length |
|---|---|---|
| 6. | "Click Your Fingers Applauding the Play" | 3:31 |
| 7. | "If You Have Ghosts" | 3:08 |

Side two
| No. | Title | Length |
|---|---|---|
| 13. | "Sputnik" | 4:36 |

The three bonus tracks had appeared on 1981's U.S. version of The Evil One but not on any releases in the U.K. Together with the 1987 U.K. 12-track TOE reissue retitled I Think of Demons, they encompassed all 15 songs from Roky Erickson and the Aliens' TOE sessions.

Added to the 2005 CD reissue on Restless Records

| No. | Title | Length |
|---|---|---|
| 11. | "Hasn't Anyone Told You" | 2:39 |
| 12. | "Realize You're Mine" | 4:35 |
| 13. | "Haunt (alternate take)" | 3:35 |

The tracks also appear as side three of Light in the Attic's 2013 double-LP re-release of the album with an etching by artist Travis Millard on side four.
