= Party Weekend =

Studio album by Joe "King" Carrasco
- Released: 1983
- Genre: Tex-Mex, rock
- Label: MCA
- Producer: Richard Gottehrer

Joe "King" Carrasco chronology
Synapse Gap (Mundo Total) (1982)	Party Weekend (1983)	Nuevo Wavo (1984)

Party Weekend is an album by the American musician Joe "King" Carrasco, released in 1983. He was backed by his band, the Crowns. A video was shot for the title track, which contains an appearance by the conservationist Ila Loetscher. Carrasco supported the album with North American and European tours.

== Production ==
MCA Records was hoping for a hit and brought in the producer Richard Gottehrer; the band did not enjoy the recording sessions, as they felt that he had too great an influence. Carrasco had asked MTV viewers to help pick the album title, and briefly considered using "Sombrero Fudge". "Tears Been A-Fallin'" incorporates elements of reggae music. The structure of "Lupe" was influenced by the McCoys' "Hang On Sloopy", which was also produced by Gottehrer. The title track and "Buena" were among the older songs that Carrasco rerecorded for Party Weekend.

== Critical reception ==
Professional ratings
Review scores
Source	Rating
AllMusic	3/5 stars
Arizona Daily Star	A−
Robert Christgau	B
Duluth News Tribune	9/10
Houston Chronicle	3.5/5 stars
Lincoln Journal Star	4/5 stars
MusicHound Rock: The Essential Album Guide	1.5/5 stars
Omaha World-Herald	3.5/5 stars
The Philadelphia Inquirer	4/4 stars
Ventura County Star	A

The Lincoln Journal Star stated that "the primary influence on Carrasco is the Mexican-influenced, punchy rock 'n' roll distinguished by a syncopated beat and a cheesy organ sound." The Duluth News Tribune called the album "another irresistible slab of happiness from one of rock's genuinely delightful acts." The Buffalo News labeled Carrasco "the monarch of the rinky-dink Farfisa organ sound". The Kansas City Times said that Gottehrer "is able to brighten up the band's sound and emphasize its strengths without robbing it of its wacky exuberance."

The Houston Chronicle noted that "for all its ingrained musicality and rich culture, it forces the party to formulaic proportions". The Philadelphia Inquirer said admiringly that the songs "sound slick and tacky all at once". Robert Christgau wrote that Carrasco seemed too "hyper and overextended". The StarPhoenix likened "Lupe" to the Archies, "all pumped up on mescal, beer, and suntan lotion".

Trouser Press called the album "murderously infectious and upbeat—attitudinally the Southwest's answer to the Ramones."

== Track listing ==
No.	Title	Length
1.	"Let's Go"
2.	"Dance Republic"
3.	"Kantina"
4.	"Get Off"
5.	"Buena"
6.	"Tears Been A-Fallin'"
7.	"Party Weekend"
8.	"Let's Go Nutz"
9.	"Lupe"
10.	"Perfect Spot"
11.	"Burnin' It Down"
12.	"Gracias"
