= Synapse Gap (Mundo Total) =

Studio album by Joe "King" Carrasco & the Crowns
- Released: 1982
- Genre: Tex-Mex, new wave
- Label: MCA
- Producer: Tony Ferguson

Joe "King" Carrasco & the Crowns chronology
| Party Safari (1981) | Synapse Gap (Mundo Total) (1982) | Party Weekend (1983) |

Synapse Gap (Mundo Total) is an album by Joe "King" Carrasco & the Crowns, released in 1982.

== Production ==
Produced by Tony Ferguson, the album was recorded at Studio 55, in Los Angeles. The Jackson 5 were also recording at the studio; Carrasco became friendly with Michael and asked him to contribute harmony vocals to "Don't Let a Woman (Make a Fool Out of You)". Some of the album's songs were co-written with keyboardist Kris Cummings.

== Critical reception ==
Professional ratings
Review scores
| Source | Rating |
|---|---|
| AllMusic | 4.5/5 stars |
| Robert Christgau | A− |
| Lincoln Journal Star | 3.5/4 stars |
| The New Rolling Stone Record Guide | 3/5 stars |

Robert Christgau wrote that "nothing drags, nothing protrudes, and the Zorba solo and reggae number could come off a Sam the Sham album." The Oklahoman deemed the album "a mixture of danceable Tex-Mex melodies, Jamaican rhythms and Carrasco's energetic vocals centered around an old fashioned Farfisa organ." Texas Monthly thought that Carrasco's "music has an edge on most New Wave: his sound is positive, humorous, and upward-moving." The Lincoln Journal Star noted that the album quells "the peppy Tex-Mex slightly in favor of a heavier beat."

== Track listing ==
| No. | Title | Length |
|---|---|---|
| 1. | "Imitation Class" |
| 2. | "Person–Person" |
| 3. | "Don't Let a Woman (Make a Fool Out of You)" |
| 4. | "Where We At" |
| 5. | "Senor Lover" |
| 6. | "Wanna Get That Feel (Again)" |
| 7. | "Bad Rap" |
| 8. | "Front Me Some Love" |
| 9. | "Rip It Up, Shake It Up, (Go-Go)" |
| 10. | "That's the Love" |
| 11. | "Man Overboard" |

== Personnel ==
- Joe "King" Carrasco – vocals, guitar
- Kris Cummings – keyboards, vocals
- Brad Kizer – bass
- Dick Ross – drums
- Michael Jackson – backing vocals on "Don't Let a Woman (Make a Fool Out of You)"
