= Gremlins Have Pictures =

1986 compilation album by Roky Erickson

Compilation album by Roky Erickson
- Released: 1986
- Recorded: 1975–1982
- Genre: Psychedelic rock, garage rock, punk rock, outsider music
- Length: 53:12
- Producer: Patrick McGarrigle, Billy Steele, Derek Tracy

Roky Erickson chronology
Don't Slander Me (1986)	Gremlins Have Pictures (1986)	Casting the Runes (1987)

Professional ratings
Review scores
Source	Rating
AllMusic	2.5/5 stars
The Austin Chronicle	4/5 stars
Pitchfork	8.7/10
Robert Christgau	C+

Gremlin Have Pictures is a solo album by American singer Roky Erickson, released in 1986. Described by Billboard writer Morgan Enos as "a grab-bag of acid rockers, acoustic ballads and assorted oddities", it compiles material recorded between 1975 and 1982 in various venues, and with three backing bands, the Aliens, the Explosives, and Blieb Alien. It includes a cover of the Velvet Underground's "Heroin".

== Reception ==
Pitchfork reviewer Jason Heller said that "Gremlins provides a candid peek under Erickson’s hood during his most potent years as a solo artist. Top to bottom, it’s a revelation ... jagged and unhinged enough for the chaos of Erickson’s subconscious to bleed through." He particularly praised the acoustic songs, especially "I’m a Demon," which he called "an eternal, elemental performance, a roughhewn mass of outsider self-exorcism that echoes alongside Hasil Adkins, Syd Barrett, Jonathan Richman, Daniel Johnston, and Alex Chilton." Austin Chronicle writer Scott Schinder called Erickson's 1980s albums, released after his half-decade involuntary stay in a Texas psychiatric hospital, "the clearest glimpse into his raging musical soul." He described Gremlins Have Pictures as "in some ways the most compelling" album of this era, "a stylistic and chronological scattering of live tracks, alternate versions, and stray songs (that) offers a vivid, unvarnished account of Roky Erickson's singular talent and vision." Billboard's Enos said that "I Have Always Been Here Before" "may be the most gorgeous, primeval ballad (Erickson) ever wrote." Jason Ankeny of AllMusic was less positive, saying that of the three backing bands, "only the Explosives are remotely competent, although Roky himself is surprisingly together." He also praises the song "I Have Always Been Here Before," noting that on it, "Erickson acknowledges a connection between himself and fellow walking casualty Syd Barrett."

== Track listing ==
All tracks are written by Roky Erickson except "Heroin" by Lou Reed.

Gremlins Have Pictures track listing
No.	Title	Length
1.	"Night of the Vampire"	5:35
2.	"The Interpreter"	2:41
3.	"Song to Abe Lincoln"	2:26
4.	"John Lawman"	2:47
5.	"Anthem (I Promise)"	4:24
6.	"Warning (Social & Political Injustices)"	2:10
7.	"Sweet Honey Pie"	2:45
8.	"Cold Night for Alligators"	3:31
9.	"I Am"	2:28
10.	"Heroin"	4:28
11.	"I Have Always Been Here Before"	3:08
12.	"Before in the Beginning"	6:36
13.	"Bermuda"	3:15
14.	"Burn the Flames"	1:34
15.	"I'm a Demon"	1:14
16.	"The Beast"	4:10
