= The Evil One =

1980 album by Roky Erickson and The Aliens

- 1980 UK release

Studio album by Roky Erickson and the Aliens
- Released: 1980 (UK); 1981 (US)
- Recorded: 1978–1979
- Genres: Psychedelic rock, horror rock, punk rock, hard rock
- Length: 51:46
- Labels: CBS (UK); 415 (US)
- Producer: Stu Cook

Roky Erickson chronology
| The Evil One (1980) | Don't Slander Me (1986) |

US edition cover
- 1981 US release

The Evil One (also known as Roky Erickson and the Aliens or I Think of Demons officially, and as TEO, Five Symbols or Hieroglyph) is the first album by American psychedelic horror rock band Roky Erickson and the Aliens. The album was Erickson's first after his time with the band the 13th Floor Elevators and several years of personal problems.

The recording sessions took place in 1978 and 1979, with 15 songs completed. A U.K. version was released in 1980, followed by a U.S. version in 1981, each with a different 10-song track listing. Subsequent digital releases and expanded vinyl editions of the album comprise all 15 songs.

In the years since its release, several of The Evil One's songs have been covered and re-popularized by modern rock acts, including Ghost, Foo Fighters, and Queens of the Stone Age.

== Background ==
Roky Erickson wrote much of the material that would make up The Evil One during his incarceration at the Rusk State Hospital for the Criminally Insane between 1969 and 1972. Friends would visit him at Rusk, bringing him musical instruments, and with fellow inmates he founded a band called the Missing Links. On visits to his incarcerated friend, Golden Dawn guitarist George Kinney collected Erickson's lyrics, often smuggling them out in bits, and published them as a book called Openers in April 1972. This first edition was full of references to love, peace, God, and totems of Christian mysticism that Kinney hoped he could use as evidence that Erickson was fit for release and able to pursue gainful employment as a poet.

After his release in November 1972, Erickson attempted to reunite his psychedelic rock band the 13th Floor Elevators. After rehearsals and a handful of gigs, the partial reunion soon dissolved. Wanting to distance himself from his hippie-era associations, Erickson turned to his fandom for B-movies as source material and dubbed his new music horror rock. When asked about his departure from the 13th Floor Elevators' material, he told the Fort Worth Star Telegram:

I have good memories of those days. But that really wasn't my bag. I'm a horror lover and that's what I'm into now. I'm trying to horrify them, demonize them, and "possessionize" them. I guess that would be a really good way to describe what I do. All my life I've run into people who said, "If you read too much of that horror, it's going to hurt you." They were always trying to take it away from me. But people love monsters. They love horror movies and I just figured it would be kind of neat to put it all into music.

Erickson began to edit the lyrics he had written in Rusk, reshaping their Christian overtones as horror-themed lyrics by swapping out any mention of God and Jesus for Satan and Lucifer, explaining that God and the Devil were two sides of the same coin. He assembled a band with the help of electric autoharpist and Elevators fan Billy Miller, naming the group "Blieb Alien" from the pairing of an anagram for "Bible" with Erickson's claim that he was from outer space. The first lineup of Blieb Alien featured members of Miller's previous band Cold Sun and played their first gig as the opening act for the world premiere of The Texas Chainsaw Massacre at 1974's Texas Film Festival. The set debuted Erickson's horror rock songs "Red Temple Prayer (Two Headed Dog)," "The Wind And More" and "Stand For The Fire Demon," among others. Blieb Alien continued to gig into 1975 playing Erickson's new songs with occasional dips into hits from The 13th Floor Elevators' repertoire.

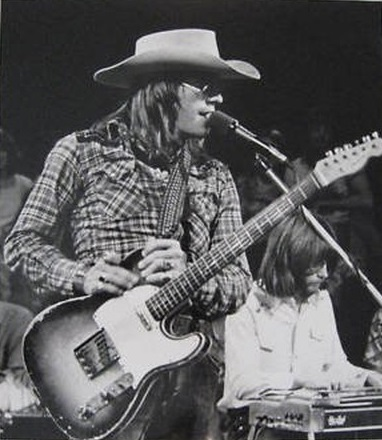
Blieb Alien lead guitarist Doug Sahm

Early recordings of songs that would later make up The Evil One saw release on singles and EPs from various sessions between 1975 and 1977. The first of these was "Red Temple Prayer (Two Headed Dog)" recorded with Blieb Alien and issued in 1975 by Mars Records, a label run by Sir Douglas Quintet frontman Doug Sahm who also played lead guitar on the A-side." While the single's B-side, the Buddy Holly-inspired "Starry Eyes", enjoyed airplay on local country music stations, Rolling Stone's review of the record paired its A-side with the Sex Pistols' "Anarchy in the U.K." to define the emerging punk rock subgenre. Writing for NME, Nick Kent called it "A vision of psychotic dread."

At this time, Craig Luckin became Erickson's manager, bringing in a new rhythm section and co-publishing the songs that would make up The Evil One through his company Orb Productions. Doug Sahm's guitar tech, Duane Aslaksen, took up lead guitar as well as musical arranging duties for the band. This new incarnation of Blieb Alien dropped the "Blieb" part from its name in order to be more accessible to radio DJs, and simply became "The Aliens.

Various Aliens lineups featuring Aslaksen on lead guitar and Miller on autoharp continued to record demos, copies of which traded hands around North America and Europe. "Bermuda" and "The Interpreter," two songs that would feature on Roky Erickson's LP Don't Slander Me a decade later, were recorded in 1976 and released on both sides of the Atlantic by a handful of labels in 1977. Another session from 1976 was picked up by French journalist Philippe Garnier of Rock & Folk magazine for a release on his short-lived Sponge Records label. In 1977, Sponge issued debut versions of "Mine, Mine, Mind" and "Click Your Fingers, Applauding The Play," and a new recording of "Two-Headed Dog" as a 7" EP along with the quieter "I Have Always Been Here Before" that Erickson recorded solo. The EP would later be issued on 12" format as Two Head Dog in 1988.

Erickson further developed material for The Evil One while fronting live gigs with Austin punk band the Explosives. Much of his work with the Explosives has surfaced on live albums and video footage in the years since.

== Album recording ==
The recording sessions began in December 1978 with producer Stu Cook, former bass player of Creedence Clearwater Revival, who would end up overdubbing bass parts on the songs "Sputnik" and "Bloody Hammer". In addition to Aslaksen and Miller, Cook and Luckin brought in Moby Grape drummer John "Fuzzy Furioso" Oxendine, bassist Steven Morgan Burgess, and Motown keyboardist Andre Lewis. The band recorded basic tracks and overdubs in a Marin County studio called The Church interspersed with rehearsals at Cook's Cosmo's Factory warehouse.

Over the course of the month, Erickson's mental health began to deteriorate, often exacerbated by drug use, and his ability to sing, play guitar, and cooperate in recording became unreliable. With the rest of the band playing well but Erickson's performance being erratic in the studio, Cook had to resort to "wild-synching" vocal tracks—capturing what he could of Erickson and then splicing tape to make it match up with what the Aliens has already recorded. In this way Cook, with the help of Luckin, ended up helping arrange songs into verses and choruses when Erickson's lyrics did not fit into a conventional rock music structure. Shakeups in the band resulted in various session musicians playing on different songs.

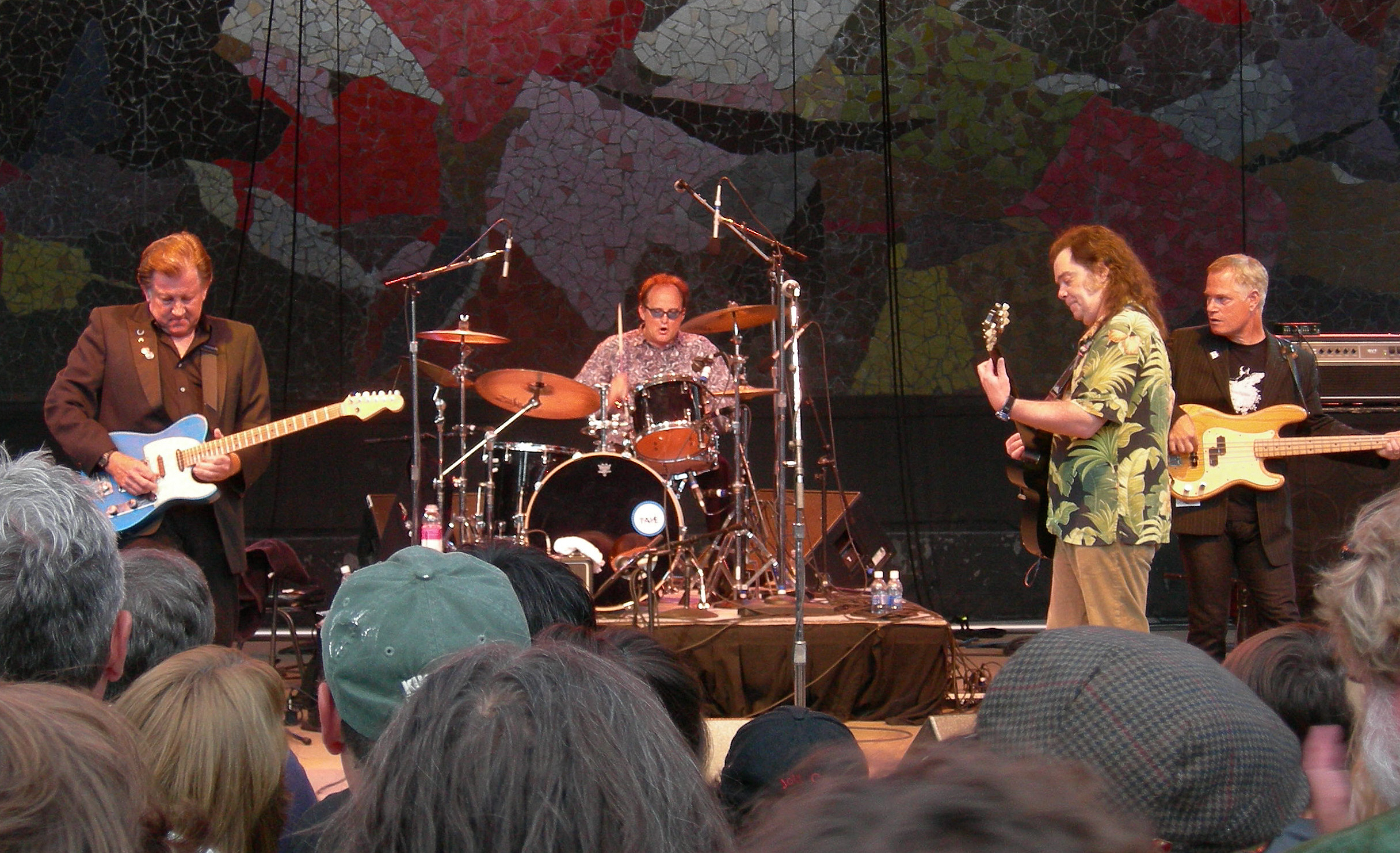
Roky Erickson playing with The Explosives

During this time, Erickson's first wife, Dana, left him. Erickson had been dividing his time between California where his manager, producer, and bandmates were based, and his home state of Texas. The album's recording process was ultimately interrupted when police arrested Erickson during a psychotic episode near his mother's home in Austin and he was sentenced to 90 days of incarceration in the Austin State Hospital. Erickson regained some faculties under treatment and called Cook and Luckin, saying that he was ready to finish the album. Flying to Texas in April 1979 with the unfinished 16-track reels, Cook and Luckin took turns signing Erickson out of the hospital on day passes and brought him to Austin's Hound Sound studio so that he could complete his vocal tracks. Some songs, like Erickson's "Can't Be Brought Down," were worked on but unfinished for The Evil One, appearing instead on later releases.

After serving 90 days at Austin State Hospital, Erickson moved on to enlist Texas punk bands Reversible Cords, the Explosives, and the Nervebreakers to perform as his backing group for live gigs around Texas. Meanwhile, the album was finished in its author's absence. Producer Stu Cook later told historian Joe Nick Patoski, "By the time the record came out, Roky was gone. I never got to say, 'Heres the album.' We never really said goodbye."

== Releases ==
CBS Records' UK A&R representative Howard Thompson signed Erickson for a one-record deal. A 10-song album was released in early 1980 by CBS in both the United Kingdom and Netherlands. The original front cover design by artist Captain Colorz, an abstract painter from California who had been the Aliens' defacto artist during Erickson's time in the Bay Area. Colorz's cover art bore no words on it and came with a removable sticker that titled it eponymously as Roky Erickson and the Aliens. The band had wanted to name the album The Evil One, but CBS executives dismissed the idea and the only reference on the U.K. release appears in the album's liner notes, announcing the album's title by the acronym TEO. The original UK vinyl editions also present five rune-like symbols (revealed, at a later date, to spell out the word ALIEN in some other alphabet) under the band's name on the LP's labels and more prominently on the cover of the album's cassette version, causing many to refer to the album as Five Symbols or Hieroglyphs.

To support the LP, CBS UK issued the singles "Creature with the Atom Brain" b/w "The Wind and More" in August 1980, followed by "Mine Mine Mind" b/w "Bloody Hammer" in October. These singles' A-sides appeared on the LP, while the B-sides did not, despite A&R rep Howard Thompson's wishes. Other unreleased material from the Stu Cook session, such as the song "Sputnik", appeared on a different 10-song LP released in 1981 by San Francisco label 415 Records after Epic Records passed on the option to sign the Aliens. This US edition was more clearly titled The Evil One.

In 1987, Edsel Records reissued the CBS album under the title I Think of Demons and expanded its track listing to 12 songs from the original 10. In the US, CD reissues through Restless Records and other labels stuck with The Evil One as the album's title and included all 15 tracks from the 1979 Stu Cook session. Many other reissues have followed on various formats, often rearranging the album's track order. The 2002 version released by Austin label Sympathy for the Record Industry spread the 15 tracks over four sides of a double LP and issued its CD version with a bonus disc packaged as The Evil One (Plus One) featuring a 48-minute appearance of Roky Erickson and the Aliens from August 1979 on San Jose radio station KSJO's The Modern Humans Show. In addition to interview clips and listener phone calls with Erickson talking about music and horror films, the Modern Humans disc features many of The Aliens' earlier demo recordings of songs from The Evil One..

== Songs ==
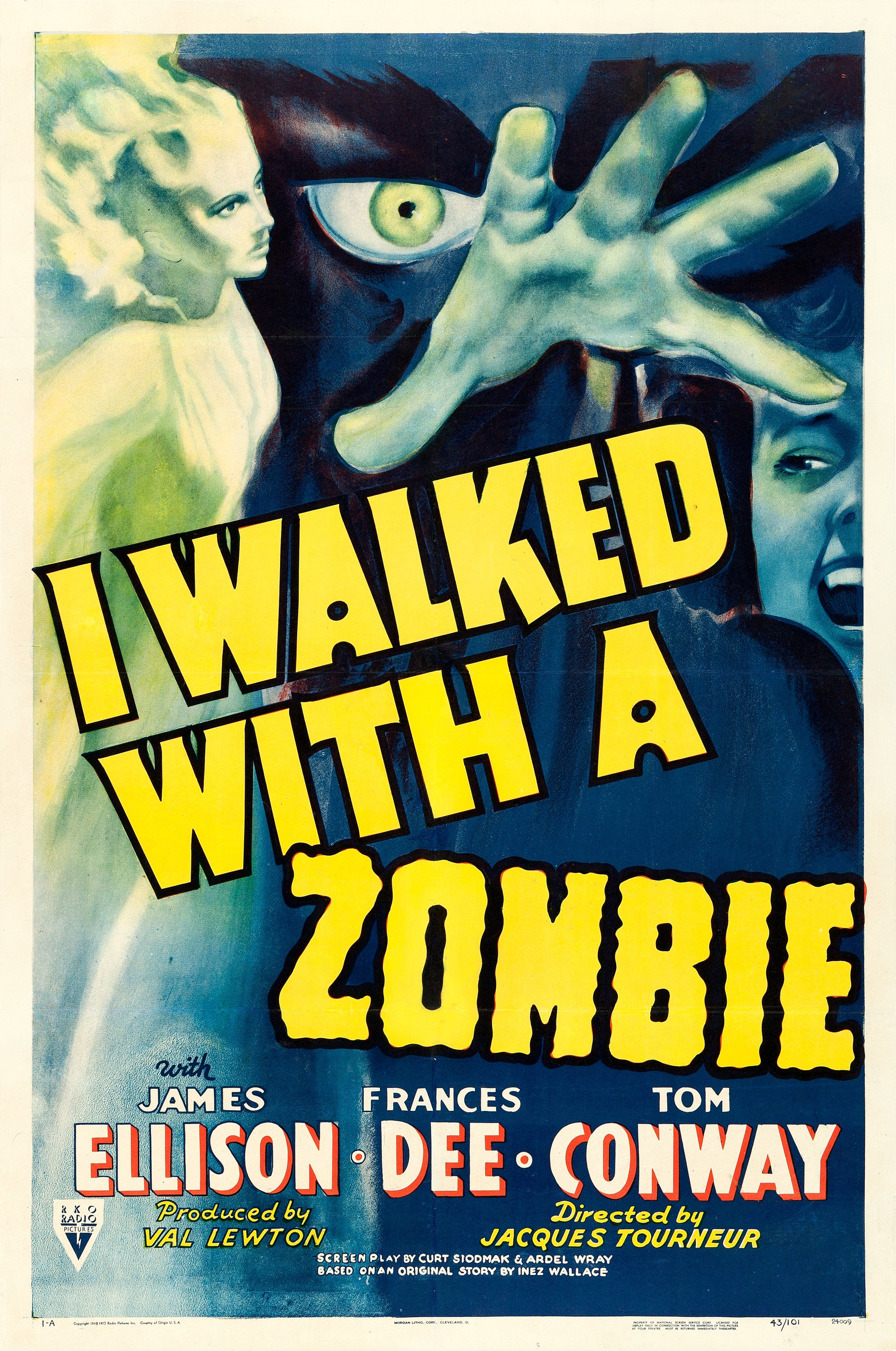
Poster for I Walked with a Zombie (1943), one of many films that inspired Roky Erickson's songs

Many of The Evil One's songs, such as "White Faces" and "The Wind and More", evoke Erickson's fandom of vintage horror movies in general, while others refer to specific films. 1943's I Walked with a Zombie and 1955's Creature with the Atom Brain—both screenwritten by Curt Siodmak—provided titles for songs on the album. For the latter song, Erickson recites patches of dialogue from the film. Other song titles were lifted from different media: "Night of the Vampire" is a slowed down and lyricized reimagining of The Moontrekkers' 1961 instrumental hit of the same name, produced by Erickson's hero Joe Meek. Erickson also sings that his vampire was born on Saint Swithin's Day (July 15), which is also Roky Erickson's date of birth. More obtusely, the song "Sputnik" aligns its name with Erickson's quasi-acronymical subtitle, "Spelling Your Theory, Alien I Creator," along with the Soviet Union's first man-made satellite.

Erickson's horror rock lyrics are also layered with the personal horror he endured while locked up and subjected to electroshock and drug therapy at Rusk. "Don't Shake Me Lucifer" and "I Walked with a Zombie" describe Erickson's experiences being dosed with Fluphenazine and Thorazine. The song "Bloody Hammer" evokes "Doctors and psychiatrists / Demons and vampires" in the same list while Erickson insists repeatedly, "I never hammered my mind out / I never had that bloody hammer" in an indictment of a certain Doctor O'Chane.

In interviews, Erickson told differing versions of what his songs were about, often claiming they were based on true stories. In a 1979 appearance on The Modern Humans radio show, he attributed the narrative of "Bloody Hammer" to a fraternity hazing ritual gone awry from a story published by Bennett Cerf in the 1944 Random House anthology Famous Ghost Stories. In the same Modern Humans interview, Erickson explained his impetus for writing "Two Headed Dog," saying, "I found this article about this little girl who'd been nailed to a cross by her father." Aliens autoharpist Billy Miller claims that the song was about atrocities committed by U.S. soldiers during the Viet Nam War, saying, "Roky saw a picture of a little girl that had been crucified by American GIs, and that's what inspired him to write that song."

== Reception ==
Professional ratings
Review scores
| Source | Rating |
|---|---|
| AllMusic | 3/5 stars |
| The Austin Chronicle | 5/5 stars |
| Robert Christgau | B+ |
| Tom Hull | B |
| Pitchfork | 8.5/10 |

=== Contemporaneous ===
A year before The Evil One's release, there was already a buzz among the music press about the album. Austin American-Statesman music writer Joe Nick Patoski sat in on one sessions at Hound Sound in April 1979 and praised what he heard. Erickson and his handlers made numerous radio appearances and offered listeners snippets of the album through demo tapes that were also trading hands amongst fans and the press.

Upon the album's U.K. release, CBS allocated a scant press budget to support it, affording Erickson a trip to England for some 20 interviews, but not enough to fly a supporting band over for a U.K. or European tour. A trip to Stonehenge left Erickson in a weird headspace and these meetings with the press did not go as hoped by the label. Tom Hibbert's transcript of his interview depicts Erickson turning every question around on his interviewer:

hibbert: You once wrote a song called "President Ford Is a Square Queer."
erickson: No, I think you did.
hibbert: I did?
erickson: Yeah.
hibbert: Did I?
erickson: Yeah.
hibbert: Oh, well, you once wrote a song about Bo Diddley.
erickson: A song about Billy?
hibbert: Bo Diddley.
erickson: You wrote a song about Bo Diddley?
hibbert: No, you did.

After meeting with and attempting to interview Erickson on two separate occasions during the singer's visit to London, Nick Kent wound up subtitling his article for New Musical Express "I Talked with a Zombie." Kent, a fan of all the 13th Floor Elevators and Blieb Alien material, had been privy to the demo tapes that preceded the album. Soured by Erickson's erratic demeanor, Kent reported that whereas the demos "sound alive with menacing magnificence," he called the album "tame and rather insignificant" in comparison, having "production that makes Erickson sound like a side-show freak spewing forth Hammer-horror mind-scrambles."

Botched interviews notwithstanding, the album received some favorable reviews upon its release. Sandy Robertson of Sounds called it "Led Zeppelin for psychotics." Closer to home, Dallas-based disc jockey George Gimarc hailed the UK edition as an "album of swamp-riddled songs" while praising CBS's two Aliens singles with their non-album B-sides as well.

=== Retrospective ===
Though not widely heard at the time of its release, the album grew to be an eccentric cult classic in the following decades. In retrospective journalism, Pitchfork reviewer Jason Heller called the album "brilliant. ... In a spasms of feral, lip-twisted fury, he snarls about demons, zombies, vampires, ghosts, and demons again with all the intensity of a rabies victim." Heller noted that Erickson's interest in horror and sci-fi imagery drew comparisons with the progressive hard rock of Blue Öyster Cult and Alice Cooper, as well as punk rock. Mark Deming of AllMusic wrote that "The Evil One shows just how strong a rocker (Erickson) could be – and how good a band he could put together. Great stuff, and certainly the best representation of Roky's "latter-day punk" period."

Austin Chronicle writer Scott Schinder called Erickson's 1980s albums, released after his half-decade involuntary stay in a Texas psychiatric hospital, "the clearest glimpse into his raging musical soul." He described The Evil One as "the mother lode. It's the disc on which Erickson comes across most clear-eyed, and the source of many of his best-loved solo songs." Tony Bennett of the Duluth News Tribune noted that Erickson's personal troubles did not diminish the passion and intensity of his music, saying that "while his songs are unusual, indeed, the man could sing like a banshee. ... His voice possesses the traits that the greatest rock singers own. Energy, passion, good pitch, soul – he's got it all."

On its website, Trouser Press sorts out the particulars of the album's various additions, saying, "The Evil One ... takes five tracks from the UK release (overlooking the awesome 'Two-Headed Dog') and adds five more, including the ghastly (that's good) 'Bloody Hammer.' Which LP is better? They're both wonderfully ominous and frightening splatter-film soundtracks done with real rock'n'roll conviction. The best bet, however, is the Pink Dust CD, which collects the contents of both albums. I Think of Demons, created as an expanded reissue of the first LP, is another fine choice, as it contains a dozen of the CD's fifteen songs."

=== Posthumous ===
When Erickson died in 2019, his life's work garnered an outpouring of praise. Both longtime Aliens devotees and publications who had snubbed or overlooked Erickson in the past wrote lovingly about The Evil One.

Billboard writer Morgan Enos said that The Evil One "brims over with propulsive bangers about harrowing visions. ... Every moment slams with a galvanic precision." Rolling Stone writer Hank Shteamer called the album "soulful and assured," noting that Erickson seemed fully at home even on the darkest material.

In an obituary for Erickson after his 2019 death, British music magazine Kerrang! singled out The Evil One as perhaps Erickson's most influential album, calling it "an important precursor to the psychobilly and horror metal genres" for its "strange, cinematic approach to psychedelia." The magazine also praised "Night of the Vampire" as "easily the greatest vampire song in history. ... Roky paints on the vampire as he lives in the cultural subconscious, a being of film, literature, and ancient myth all at once."

== Track listings ==
=== 1980 CBS Records LP ===
Titled as Roky Erickson and the Aliens†

All tracks are written by Roky Erickson.

Side one
| No. | Title | Length |
|---|---|---|
| 1. | "Two-Headed Dog (Red Temple Prayer)" | 3:18 |
| 2. | "I Think of Demons" | 2:44 |
| 3. | "I Walked With a Zombie" | 2:47 |
| 4. | "Don't Shake Me Lucifer" | 2:50 |
| 5. | "Night of the Vampire" | 4:16 |

Side two
| No. | Title | Length |
|---|---|---|
| 1. | "White Faces" | 2:34 |
| 2. | "Cold Night for Alligators" | 3:02 |
| 3. | "Creature with the Atom Brain" | 4:12 |
| 4. | "Mine Mine Mind" | 2:34 |
| 5. | "Stand for the Fire Demon" | 5:25 |

†Though a removable sticker on the 1980 U.K. release read "Roky Erikson and the Aliens," its lyric sheet was titled "TEO" for "The Evil One." Pressings of the original LP and cassette also featured five rune-like symbols below the band's name, and for this reason many official listings call the album "Five Symbols" while some fans call it "Hieroglyphs."

=== 1981 415 Records LP ===
Titled as The Evil One

All tracks are written by Roky Erickson.

Side one
| No. | Title | Length |
|---|---|---|
| 1. | "Don't Shake Me Lucifer" | 2:49 |
| 2. | "Click Your Fingers Applauding the Play" | 2:31 |
| 3. | "If You Have Ghosts" | 3:08 |
| 4. | "Cold Night for Alligators" | 3:00 |
| 5. | "Stand for the Fire Demon" | 5:23 |

Side two
| No. | Title | Length |
|---|---|---|
| 1. | "Sputnik" | 4:36 |
| 2. | "I Think of Demons" | 2:43 |
| 3. | "Creature with the Atom Brain" | 4:10 |
| 4. | "The Wind and More" | 3:57 |
| 5. | "Bloody Hammer" | 4:19 |

Edsel Records 1987 I Think of Demons LP and CD reprises the CBS UK tracklist with the insertion of CBS's two non-album B-sides—"Bloody Hammer" and "The Wind and More"—at the end of each album side.

=== 1987 15-track combined release ===
Titled The Evil One with artwork from the 1980 Roky Erickson and the Aliens LP. First released by Restless Records on CD, comprising all tracks from both the CBS and 415 releases.

All tracks are written by Roky Erickson.

| No. | Title | Length |
|---|---|---|
| 1. | "Two Headed Dog (Red Temple Prayer)" | 3:20 |
| 2. | "I Think of Demons" | 2:47 |
| 3. | "Creature with the Atom Brain" | 4:13 |
| 4. | "The Wind and More" | 4:00 |
| 5. | "Don't Shake Me Lucifer" | 2:53 |
| 6. | "Bloody Hammer" | 4:22 |
| 7. | "Stand for the Fire Demon" | 5:26 |
| 8. | "Click Your Fingers Applauding the Play" | 2:34 |
| 9. | "If You Have Ghosts" | 3:11 |
| 10. | "I Walked with a Zombie" | 2:49 |
| 11. | "Night of the Vampire" | 4:19 |
| 12. | "It's a Cold Night for Alligators" | 3:04 |
| 13. | "Mine Mine Mind" | 2:34 |
| 14. | "Sputnik" | 4:39 |
| 15. | "White Faces" | 2:34 |

Subsequent digital releases have featured these 15 tracks in varying order. Expanded vinyl reissues also contain all 15 songs with varied track sequences spread over three or four sides of a double LP. Light in the Attic Records' 2013 edition of the double-LP features the CBS U.K. LP as its first two sides, the remaining five Evil One songs on its third side, and an etching of a two-headed dog by artist Travis Millard on its fourth side, as well as a 20-page booklet with liner notes by Texas historian Joe Nick Patoski.

=== 2002 "Plus One" bonus disc ===
The second disc from The Evil One (Plus One) released by Sympathy for the Record Industry. The interview with Roky Erickson and the Aliens, interspersed with songs and Erickson fielding calls from radio listeners, originally aired in 1979 while The Evil One was still in production. The song versions here predate the 1979 Stu Cook studio sessions and had been circulating as demos.

All tracks are written by Roky Erickson.

| No. | Title | Length |
|---|---|---|
| 1. | "Click Your Fingers Applauding the Play" | 3:15 |
| 2. | "Modern Humans Show 1" | 0:38 |
| 3. | "It's a Cold Night For Alligators" | 4:36 |
| 4. | "Modern Humans Show 2" | 1:38 |
| 5. | "Creature With the Atom Brain" | 3:02 |
| 6. | "Modern Humans Show 3" | 0:45 |
| 7. | "The Night of the Vampire" | 1:51 |
| 8. | "Modern Humans Show 4" | 1:52 |
| 9. | "White Faces" | 2:37 |
| 10. | "Bloody Hammer" | 4:44 |
| 11. | "Modern Humans Show 5" | 1:21 |
| 12. | "Sputnik" | 4:26 |
| 13. | "Two Headed Dog (Red Temple Prayer)" | 3:23 |
| 14. | "Modern Humans Show 6" | 0:51 |
| 15. | "Modern Humans Show 7" | 1:01 |
| 16. | "Modern Humans Show 8" | 0:44 |
| 17. | "Modern Humans Show 9" | 1:38 |
| 18. | "Mine Mine Mind" | 2:33 |
| 19. | "Modern Humans Show 10" | 2:17 |
| 20. | "I Walked With a Zombie" | 3:40 |

== Personnel ==
=== 1979 sessions ===
The Aliens

- Roky Erickson: Vocals and guitars
- Duane Aslaksen: Guitars and vocals
- Bill Miller: Electric autoharp
- Steven Morgan Burgess: Bass
- Fuzzy Furioso: Drums

Additional musicians

- Andre Lewis: Synthesizers and electronic keyboards on "Night of the Vampire," "I Think of Demons," "Mine Mine Mind," "Stand for the Fire Demons," "Cold Night for Alligators" and "I Walked with a Zombie"
- Link Davis: Hammond organ on "Night of the Vampire"
- Stu Cook: Bass on "Bloody Hammer" and "Sputnik"
- Jeff Sutton: Drums on "Bloody Hammer" and "Sputnik"
- Scott Matthews: Drums on "White Faces"
- Brian Marnell: Background vocals on "Creature With the Atom Brain" and "I Walked With a Zombie"

Production

- Stu Cook: Producer
- Duane Aslaksen: Musical director

=== Sessions appearing on the Plus One disc ===
Additional musicians

- Jeff Sutton: Drums on "Click Your Fingers Applauding the Play," "Cold Night for Alligators," "White Faces," "Bloody Hammer," "Sputnik," "Two Headed Dog" and "Mine Mine Mind"
- John Maxwell: Bass on "Cold Night for Alligators," "White Faces," "Bloody Hammer" and "Sputnik"
- Chris Johnson: Bass on "Click Your Fingers Applauding the Play," "Two Headed Dog" and "Mine Mine Mind"
- Randy Thornton: Backing vocals on "Sputnik"

Production

Duane Aslaksen and Jeff Sutton produced the 1976 session that yielded these versions of "Click Your Fingers Applauding the Play," "Two Headed Dog" and "Mine Mine Mind."

Aslaksen acted as producer on the 1977 session that yielded these version of "Cold Night for Alligators," "White Faces," "Bloody Hammer" and "Sputnik."

== Legacy and influence ==
In the years after The Evil One's release, many musicians began paying tribute to Roky Erickson and recording cover versions of his songs. One the first bands to do so were a post-punk neo-psychedlia act from France called Vietnam Veterans, recording "I Walked with a Zombie" for their 1983 album On the Right Track. Los Angeles punk denizen Jeff Dahl covered "Two Headed Dog" on his band's 1989 album Scratch Up Sonic Action. That same year, Daniel Johnston's song "I Met Roky Erickson" saw release on his album with Jad Fair. In mentions hearing "Don't Shake Me Lucifer" on the radio and then seeing Erickson play "Bloody Hammer," and "Two Headed Dog" at a concert backed by fellow Austin band True Believers.

The 1990 release of Where the Pyramid Meets the Eye: A Tribute to Roky Erickson featured 22 artists playing Erickson's songs including five that appeared on The Evil One. Several other tribute compilations to Erickson followed in the next decades, including Children of the Night: What Music They Make (Elsound, 1997), Scandinavian Friends: A Tribute to Roky Erickson (Big Dipper Records, 2007), I Think Of The Demon (Horror-Punks, 2011), We're Gonna Miss You: An Aussie Tribute to Roky Erickson & 13th Floor Elevators (Third Eye Stimuli Records, 2020), May The Circle Remain Unbroken: A Tribute To Roky Erickson (Light in the Attic Records, 2021), and I Think Of Demons: A Tribute to Roky Erickson. (Gruselthon, 2024), adding to the massive catalog covering songs by Roky Erickson and the Aliens.

The song "Two Headed Dog (Red Temple Prayer)" inspired the name of 1980s Los Angeles psychedelic/post-punk band Red Temple Spirits.

In 2013, Dave Grohl produced the EP If You Have Ghost for Swedish band Ghost, titled after Erickson's song. The following year, Grohl played the song "Two Headed Dog" with his band Foo Fighters on the TV program Austin City Limits and again in an episode of his HBO music documentary series Foo Fighters: Sonic Highways in which he also chatted with Erickson. When assembling the Sonic Highways studio album, the Foo Fighters recorded the song, but only included it a bonus flexi disc with the record's vinyl release.

In 2016, "Creature with the Atom Brain" topped Rob Zombie's "5 Songs I Wish I'd Written" list that appeared in Rolling Stone. "It's a very big-sounding rock song," he wrote, saying that Erickson had "a really big voice," and added that "The song itself isn't particularly creepy – it's the lyrics and delivery."

Below is a partial listing of artists covering songs from The Evil One:

"Bloody Hammer"

- Antiseen (2001)
- Queens of the Stone Age (2003)
- Mondo Generator (2004)

"Click Your Fingers Applauding the Play"

- Electric Six (2021)

"Creature With the Atom Brain"

- Quintron & Miss Pussycat (2018)

"Don't Shake Me Lucifer"

- Bates Motel (1997)
- The Meatmen (2009)

"If You Have Ghosts"

- John Wesley Harding & The Good Liars (1990)
- Ghost (2013)
- Chelsea Wolfe (2021)

"It's a Cold Night for Alligators"

- Southern Pacific (1990)
- The Hellacopters (2000)

"I Walked with a Zombie"

- The Vietnam Veterans (1983)
- R.E.M. (1990)
- Alice Donut (1995)
- U.K. Subs (1991)
- Elf Power (2002)
- Turbonegro (2005)
- Dead City feat. Cheetah Chrome (2006)

"Night of the Vampire"

- The Fuzztones (1992)
- Entombed (1995)
- Ty Segall (2021)

"Two Headed Dog (Red Temple Prayer)"

- Jeff Dahl Group (1989)
- Antiseen (1990)
- Sister Double Happiness (1990)
- The Barracudas (2010)
- The Screaming Tribesmen (2011)
- Foo Fighters (2014)
- Margo Price (2021)

"White Faces"

- Angry Samoans (1990)
- The Devil's Blood (2008), from their EP Come Reap
- Me and that Man (2024)
