= Joe "King" Carrasco and the Crowns =

Studio album by Joe Carrasco
- Released: 1980
- Genre: Tex Mex
- Labels: Stiff (UK); Hannibal (US)
- Producer: Billy Altman

Joe "King" Carrasco and the Crowns is an album by Joe Carrasco. It was released by Stiff Records (SEEZ 28) on October 10, 1980, in the United Kingdom. An American version with a different track listing and cover design was released by Hannibal Records (HNBL 1308) around the same time.

== Critical reception ==
Professional ratings
Review scores
Source	Rating
AllMusic	3/5 stars
Robert Christgau	A−
MusicHound Rock: The Essential Album Guide	4/5 stars
The Rolling Stone Album Guide	2/5 stars

Trouser Press wrote that the band's forte "is performing '96 Tears' under a variety of thin guises, all of them delightful ('Let’s Get Pretty', 'Betty’s World', you name it). The tempos are revved-up punk, the feeling, Southwestern mestizo." Robert Christgau deemed the album "minimalism with roots, kind of--the irony in these calls to fun is a lot sweeter, a lot surer of its ground, than New Yorkers commonly get away with."

== Stiff album track listing ==
All listed tracks were composed by Joe "King" Carrasco and Johnny Perez; except where indicated

Side 1

1. "Buena"
2. "Betty's World"
3. "I Get My Kicks on You" (Joe "King" Carrasco)
4. "One More Time" (Roy Head)
5. "Don't Bug Me Baby" (Joe "King" Carrasco, Johnny Perez, Brad Kizer)
6. "Nervoused Out"

Side 2

1. "Caca de Vaca" (Joe "King" Carrasco)
2. "Susan Friendly"
3. "Party Doll" (Buddy Knox, Dave Alldred, Donny Lanier, Jimmy Bowen)
4. "Federales"
5. "Wild 14"
6. "Let's Get Pretty"

== Hannibal album track listing ==
Side 1

1. "Houston El Mover"
2. "One More Time"
3. "Caca de Vaca"
4. "Let's Get Pretty"
5. "Bad, Bad Girl"
6. "Don't Bug Me Baby"
7. "Federales"

Side 2

1. "Buena"
2. "Nervoused Out"
3. "Betty's World"
4. "I Get My Kicks on You"
5. "Party Doll"
6. "Gimme Sody, Judy"

== Personnel ==
- Joe "King" Carrasco – guitar, vocals
- Kris Cummings – keyboards
- Brad Kizer – bass
- Mike Navarro – drums
