= Joe Carrasco =

Joe "King" Carrasco
- Born: Joseph Charles Teutsch; December 6, 1953 (age 72); Moore County, Texas, U.S.
- Origin: Dumas, Texas, U.S.
- Genres: Tejano music; New wave music
- Years active: 1985–2011
- Labels: Anaconda; New Rose; MCA; Stiff

Joe "King" Carrasco (born Joseph Charles Teutsch; December 6, 1953) is an American musician, guitarist, vocalist, and songwriter currently based in Puerto Vallarta, Mexico.

== Biography ==
Joe King Carrasco, who is known as the "King of Tex-Mex rock 'n' roll", mixes Nuevo Wavo rock and Latin rhythms. Carrasco was born Joseph Charles Teutsch on December 6, 1953, in Moore County, Texas, the son of Tucker and Virginia Stovall Teutsch. In the 7th grade, he started playing in garage bands in the west Texas town of Dumas, Texas. He was often found on the beaches of Mexico, falling in love with the Mexican music. Back in Texas he formed the band Joe King Carrasco and El Molino, which included many of the future members of the Texas Tornados. He released "Tex-Mex Rock & Roll", his first LP in 1979.

In late 1979, he joined up with Kris Cummings (née Kristine Anne Cummings; born 1951), Brad Kizer and Mike Navarro to form Joe King Carrasco and the Crowns in Los Angeles, California, and soon after releasing their first single, "Party Weekend", "the band was playing chic New York venues and generating lines around the block". The band signed to England's Stiff Records and toured extensively throughout Europe, Central America, Bolivia, US and Canada.

Carrasco was interviewed in Rolling Stone Magazine and appeared on Saturday Night Live. His song "Party Weekend" was rerecorded by MTV as "Party Christmas".

Influenced by the British-born Jamaican band, The Equators, Joe wrote the reggae song "Don't Let a Woman (Make a Fool Out of You)" and recorded it on Synapse Gap with Michael Jackson, singing background harmonies.

In the mid-1980s, Joe moved to Nicaragua and his songs turned more political as they addressed the political climate of Central America. In 1987, he put out his CD, Pachuco Hop, whose title song was later recorded by Manu Chao.

During the 1990s, Carrasco's songwriting moved into a cumbia and reggae groove with a little Tex-Mex thrown in for spice, a combination he called "tequila reggae". This musical blend can be heard on Dia de Los Muerto, Hot Sun, and Hay Te Guacho Cucaracho.

His songs can be heard in several films, including "Caca De Vaca" in the 1983 film Breathless with Richard Gere. They were also played on The Rockford Files and numerous independent films.

He has acted in many movies. In 2009, he released his first film, Rancho No Tengo, a romantic comedy, which he also directed and played the lead role. The movie soundtrack was released in 2008.

He has received numerous awards through the years. In 2002, he was inducted into the Austin Music Hall of Fame. In March 2012, he was honored by The Texas Music Academy with a Lifetime Achievement Award. At the Austin Music Awards in 2012, he was inducted a second time into the Austin Music Hall of Fame, this time as "Joe King Carrasco and The Crowns."

A lifetime lover of dogs, Joe founded a non profit group Viva Perros, which raises money to support homeless, abused, and neglected dogs and to help them find a better life. A portion of the profits from his last live CD, Concierto Para Los Perros, released in 2011, will go to various dog rescue groups via Viva Perros, LLC.

Carrasco regularly plays at Nacho Daddy, a Mex-Tex restaurant and club in Puerto Vallarta, when he is not out on tour.

He reunited with the original Crowns, organist and accordionist Kris Cummings, bassist Brad Kizer, and drummer Mike Navarro in June 2011. They toured together for the first time in 30 years during the summer and then went back to the studio to record a new CD. "Que Wow" with "Joe King Carrasco y Los Crowns Originales," was released during their showcase at the 2012 SXSW Music Festival in Austin, Texas.

== History ==
Carrasco founded the band "Joe 'King' Carrasco and El Molino" in Texas in the late 70s. Their album, Tex-Mex Rock & Roll, was self-released and later picked up by Big Beat Records.

As Joe 'King' Carrasco and the Crowns, Carrasco and his band released a self-titled album on Stiff Records in 1981. They then signed with major label MCA Records, releasing Synapse Gap (Mundo Total) in 1982 (with harmonies by Michael Jackson on one song), and Party Weekend in 1983.

Since the mid-1980s, Carrasco has released many CDs under his own independent label, Anaconda Records.

== Stage name ==
He adopted the surname of drug kingpin Fred Gomez Carrasco, who died during the 1974 Huntsville Prison Siege.

== Discography ==
- Joe King Carrasco & El Molino (1978, Lisa Records)
- Tales of the Crypt (1979, Roir Records)
- Joe "King" Carrasco & The Crowns (1980, Indio Records/Recovery Recordings)
- Party Safari (1981, Hannibal Records)
- Joe King Carrasco & The Crowns (1981, Hannibal Records USA)
- Joe King Carrasco & The Crowns (1980, Stiff Records Europe)
- Synapse Gap (Mundo Total) (1982, MCA Records)
- Party Weekend (1983, MCA Records)
- Nuevo Wavo (1984, Anaconda Records)
- Bordertown (1985, Big Beat Records USA)
- Bordertown (1985, New Rose Records (Europe)
- Bandido Rock (1987, Roir Records)
- Royal Loyal & Live (1990, Royal Texacali Records)
- Dia De Los Muertos (1993, Royal Texacali Records)
- Anthology (1995, MCA records)
- Hot Sun (1999, Anaconda Records)
- Hay Te Guacho Cucaracho (2001, Anaconda Records)
- El Rey (2008, Anaconda Records)
- Rancho No Tengo (2008, Anaconda Records)
- Concierto Para Los Perros (2011, Anaconda Records)
- Chalupa's Choice - Gran Exitos (2011, Anaconda Records)
- Tattoo Laredo (2011, Anaconda Records)
- Vamos A Get Down (2011, Anaconda Records)
- Que Wow (2012, Anaconda Records)
- Tlaquepaque (2013, Anaconda Records)
- Chiliando (2015, Anaconda Records)

== Film ==
- Rancho No Tengo (2009, Anaconda)
