= Stuart Sullivan =

Stuart Sullivan is an American record producer and recording engineer, based in Austin, Texas, United States. He is founder, owner and engineer of Wire Recording in south central Austin where he has recorded and worked with talent including Willie Nelson, Sublime, Butthole Surfers, and Meat Puppets.

== Early life ==
Sullivan was born in Michigan but grew up in West Lafayette, Indiana. He attended Indiana University (1979–83) in Bloomington and earned a bachelor's degree from the Marketing and Advertising School of Business. During his time as an undergrad Sullivan enrolled in the Electronic Music program which evolved into the university's official Audio Program. While making his way through school, Sullivan worked a number of sound/recording production gigs including Opera and Orchestra recordist (becoming the crew manager for two years), teaching a class on the studio environment, and running PA systems in clubs and piano bars for a professor who owned a PA company in town. Sullivan was also involved in a number of music projects including Contemporary Sounds Band, with drum major/doctoral student of composition Paul Sturm.

After college, Sullivan moved to Austin in late 1983 and began interviewing for audio related jobs. He ended up getting a job at Texas French Bread to survive before landing an additional job with Bass Concert Hall at the University of Texas as the main sound person. Sullivan took on a third job with Lonestar Studio where he worked for $5/hr cleaning while paying $45/hr to use the studio. Sullivan managed nine hours of cleaning for one hour of studio time (only at night) and made his first record, Life is Grand (Life in Soul City), with the Wild Seeds in 1984. Soon after, Sullivan began a project with The Hickoids making a record. Years later in 2002 Bud Gaugh (drummer, Sublime), Krist Novoselic (bassist, Nirvana) and Curt Kirkwood (guitarist, Meat Puppets) formed a group called Eyes Adrift and came to Sullivan at Wire to record an album. During conversation between sessions Krist mentioned one of their favorite inspiring records from childhood was the record he made with The Hickoids.

== Career as producer ==
Still working at Lonestar Studio in 1985, Sullivan became a staple in the scene and was asked to be house assistant for a new place, Arlyn Studio in Austin, assisting in the building and wiring design of the new studio. By 1985 Arlyn was up and running and local bluesman Clifford Antone asked Sullivan to make records for a new label he started called Antone's Records. From 1985 to '89 Sullivan made a variety of blues records, country records and even tejano records. Sullivan's first gold record was with Little Joe y Familia which sold 50,000 copies (50,000 copies is gold in the tejano music world). Sullivan was also doing work at Willie Nelson's studio (Perdenales Studio) before the Perdanales was shut down for tax issues. Sullivan worked with Nick Lowe and producer Colin Farely who ran Power Plant Studios and Mason Ruogse Studios in England. Shortly after that, Sullivan was offered management and spent a year working in England .

Sullivan returned to the US as the grunge scene was just starting to catch momentum and linked up with critically acclaimed producer Paul Leary of the Butthole Surfers. Their first record together was a bluegrass record by the Bad Livers and by 1993 Curt Kirkwood of Meat Puppets asked Paul and Sullivan to make a record called "Too High To Die", which went to gold status and promoted them within the developing grunge movement. Leary and Sullivan were found by major label work and recorded and produced a number of albums by bands including Sublime, Meat Puppets, Daniel Johnston, The Reverend Horton Heat, Pepper, The Refreshments and Slightly Stoopid.

== Work in Austin, Texas ==
After some time in the Los Angeles music scene of the 1990s, Sullivan began buying up recording gear with intentions of opening a studio in Austin, which he did so in 2001. Wire Recording Studio opened for business under the direction of Sullivan and brought in acts from different genres and people from different parts of the world. In 2005 he began booking with outside engineers to use the studio.
