= Where the Pyramid Meets the Eye: A Tribute to Roky Erickson =

1990 tribute album to Roky Erickson

Where the Pyramid Meets the Eye

Compilation album by various artists
- Released: October 31, 1990
- Recorded: 1990
- Genre: Rock
- Label: Sire
- Producer: Bill Bentley

Professional ratings
Review scores
Source	Rating
AllMusic	3/5 stars

Where the Pyramid Meets the Eye is a 1990 tribute album to singer-songwriter Roky Erickson, founder of the 13th Floor Elevators and solo artist, whose career was subject to significant periods of challenge from schizophrenia. The album was released by Sire Records in the United States, and by WEA International in Europe. The album was produced by Bill Bentley, who also produced a 1999 tribute album to Moby Grape co-founder Skip Spence, who, like Erickson, was subject to the challenges of schizophrenia. The album's title is said to be Erickson's definition of psychedelic music.

The album was produced with the intention of raising money for Erickson and exposing his music to a wider audience.

In 2017, 2000 copies of a two-LP edition of the album were released exclusively for Record Store Day 2017, which marked its first appearance on vinyl.

== Production ==
The bands on the compilation were a mix of Austin, Texas musicians, Erickson fans or associates, and groups on the roster of major labels Warner Bros. and Sire. Due to the maximum-length difference between compact discs, cassettes, and LPs, several songs had to be left off the original CD release, but were included on the cassette and LP versions: The Mighty Lemon Drops' "Splash #1", Lyres' "We Sell Soul," and Angry Samoans' "White Faces." R.E.M. appears twice: Credited under the band's real name on "I Walked With a Zombie," and under the alias "Vibrating Egg," with their manager Jefferson Holt on vocals, for the song "Bermuda."

Stu Cook, a bassist of the country-rock band Southern Pacific, which covered "It's a Cold Night For Alligators" for the tribute album, had produced more than a dozen of Erickson's songs in 1979, which became Erickson's album The Evil One.

== Critical reception ==
AllMusic reviewer Mark Deming wrote that "there are several moments of very real beauty and power here, especially from the artists who share Erickson's Texas heritage — Doug Sahm and ZZ Top rock out on their contributions, the Butthole Surfers' version of 'Earthquake' is one of their finest moments on wax, and T-Bone Burnett's take on 'Nothing in Return' is a heart-tugging gem." Joe Nick Patoski of Texas Monthly called it "the best rock and roll album I've heard in years," praising the musicians' "unbridled passion" for Erickson's songwriting. The Rolling Stone Album Guide called the album "an eloquent tribute to the enduring strength of Erickson's songwriting."

== Track listing ==
1. "Reverberation (Doubt)" – ZZ Top
2. "If You Have Ghosts" – John Wesley Harding & The Good Liars
3. "I Had to Tell You" – Poi Dog Pondering
4. "She Lives (In a Time of Her Own)" – Judybats
5. "Slip Inside This House" – Primal Scream
6. "You Don't Love Me Yet" – Bongwater
7. "I Have Always Been Here Before" – Julian Cope
8. "You're Gonna Miss Me" – Doug Sahm & Sons
9. "It's a Cold Night for Alligators" – Southern Pacific
10. "Fire Engine" – Richard Lloyd
11. "Bermuda" – Vibrating Egg
12. "I Walked with a Zombie" – R.E.M.
13. "Earthquake" – Butthole Surfers
14. "Don't Slander Me" – Lou Ann Barton
15. "Red Temple Prayer (Two Headed Dog)" – Sister Double Happiness
16. "Burn the Flames" – Thin White Rope
17. "Postures (Leave Your Body Behind)" – Chris Thomas featuring Tabby Thomas
18. "Nothing in Return" – T-Bone Burnett
19. "Splash #1" – The Mighty Lemon Drops
20. "We Sell Soul" – Lyres
21. "White Faces" – Angry Samoans
22. "Reverberation (Doubt)" – The Jesus and Mary Chain

Tracks 19–21 appear only on the original cassette release and the 2017 double LP reissue.
