= The Best of Bonnie Raitt =

Greatest hits album by Bonnie Raitt
- Released: September 30, 2003
- Genre: Rock
- Length: 76:27
- Label: Capitol

Bonnie Raitt chronology
Silver Lining (2002)	The Best of Bonnie Raitt (2003)	Souls Alike (2005)

Professional ratings
Review scores
Source	Rating
AllMusic	4.5/5 stars

The Best of Bonnie Raitt is a 2003 compilation album by Bonnie Raitt, released by Capitol Records.

== Reception ==
Thom Jurek of AllMusic wrote in his review, "Here is the astonishing range, from deep blue-eyed bluesy soul, sheeny reggae-tinged pop, and adult rock & roll that moves and inspires anyone with an open mind."

== Track listing ==
No.	Title	Writer(s)	Original album	Length
1.	"Thing Called Love"	John Hiatt	Nick of Time (1989)	3:50
2.	"Nick of Time"	Bonnie Raitt	Nick of Time	4:06
3.	"Love Letter"	Bonnie Hayes	Nick of Time	4:06
4.	"Have a Heart"	Hayes	Nick of Time	4:48
5.	"Something to Talk About"	Shirley Eikhard	Luck of the Draw (1991)	3:47
6.	"I Can't Make You Love Me"	Mike Reid; Allen Shamblin	Luck of the Draw	5:32
7.	"Not the Only One" (radio edit)	Paul Brady	Luck of the Draw	4:11
8.	"Love Sneakin' Up On You"	Tom Snow; Jimmy Scott	Longing in Their Hearts (1994)	3:41
9.	"You"	Bob Thiele Jr.; John Shanks; Tonio K	Longing in Their Hearts	4:28
10.	"Dimming of the Day"	Richard Thompson	Longing in Their Hearts	3:40
11.	"Love Me Like a Man" (Live)	Chris Smither; lyrics adapted by Raitt	Road Tested (1995); original version on Give It Up (1972)	4:49
12.	"Spit of Love"	Raitt	Fundamental (1998)	4:41
13.	"One Belief Away" (radio edit)	Raitt; Paul Brady; Dillon O'Brian	Fundamental	3:58
14.	"Lover's Will" (radio edit)	Hiatt	Fundamental	3:37
15.	"I Can't Help You Now"	Gordon Kennedy; Wayne Kirkpatrick; Tommy Sims	Silver Lining (2002)	3:13
16.	"Gnawin' on It"	Raitt; Roy Rogers	Silver Lining	4:48
17.	"Silver Lining" (radio edit)	David Gray	Silver Lining	3:38
18.	"Hear Me Lord"	Oliver Mtukudzi	Silver Lining	5:34
Total length:				76:27

== Charts ==
Chart performance for The Best of Bonnie Raitt
Chart (2003)	Peak position
Scottish Albums (Official Charts)	25
UK Albums (Official Charts)	37
UK Jazz & Blues Albums (Official Charts)	2

Chart (2025–2026)	Peak position
US Top Blues Albums (Billboard)	4

== Certifications ==
Certifications for The Best of Bonnie Raitt
Region	Certification	Certified units/sales
United Kingdom (BPI)	Silver	60,000^{‡}
^{‡} Sales+streaming figures based on certification alone.
