= Not the Only One (Bonnie Raitt song) =

Single by Bonnie Raitt

from the album Luck of the Draw
- Released: January 1992
- Length: 5:04 (album version); 4:07 (single edit)
- Label: Capitol
- Songwriter: Paul Brady
- Producers: Bonnie Raitt; Don Was

Bonnie Raitt singles chronology
"Slow Ride" (1991)	"Not the Only One" (1992)	"Come to Me" (1992)

Music video
- "Not the Only One" on YouTube

"Not the Only One" is a song performed by Bonnie Raitt, written by Paul Brady and produced by Don Was from the album Luck of the Draw. The single reached No. 34 in the United States and No. 13 in Canada, topping the latter country's Adult Contemporary chart.

The musicians credited are Bonnie Raitt (vocals, background vocals), Paul Brady, David Lasley and Arnold McCuller (background vocals), Debra Dobkin (percussion), Ricky Fataar (drums), Mark Goldenberg (acoustic guitar), James ‘Hutch’ Hutchinson (bass), Benmont Tench (piano) and Richard Thompson (electric guitar).

== Charts ==
=== Weekly charts ===
Chart (1992)	Peak position
Canada Top Singles (RPM)	13
Canada Adult Contemporary (RPM)	1
US Billboard Hot 100	34
US Adult Contemporary (Billboard)	2
US Cash Box Top 100	23

=== Year-end charts ===
Chart (1992)	Position
Canada Adult Contemporary (RPM)	25
US Adult Contemporary (Billboard)	19
