= Decades Rock Live: Bonnie Raitt and Friends =

Live album by Bonnie Raitt
- Released: August 15, 2006
- Recorded: September 30, 2005
- Venue: Trump Taj Majal, Atlantic City, New Jersey
- Genre: Pop/Rock
- Length: 52:14
- Label: Capitol

Bonnie Raitt chronology
Souls Alike (2005)	Decades Rock Live: Bonnie Raitt and Friends (2006)	Slipstream (2012)

Decades Rock Live: Bonnie Raitt and Friends is a DVD/CD combo, recorded live on September 30, 2005, at Trump Taj Majal, Atlantic City, New Jersey. Joining Bonnie Raitt on stage are Norah Jones, Ben Harper, Alison Krauss, Keb' Mo' and Jon Cleary. All of the songs on the CD are repeated on the DVD plus five that are exclusive to the DVD.

== Reception ==
Professional ratings
Review scores
Source	Rating
AllMusic	3.5/5 stars

== Track listing ==
CD
No.	Title	Writer(s)	Length
1.	"Introduction"		0:48
2.	"Unnecessarily Mercenary" (feat. Jon Cleary)	Jon Cleary	4:03
3.	"I Will Not Be Broken"	Gordon Kennedy; Wayne Kirkpatrick; Tommy Sims	3:41
4.	"God Was in the Water"	Randall Bramblett; Davis Causey	5:50
5.	"Gnawin' on It"	Bonnie Raitt; Roy Rogers	4:30
6.	"You" (feat. Alison Krauss)	John Shanks; Bob Thiele Jr.; Steven M. Krikorian	5:39
7.	"Love Letter" (feat. Keb' Mo')	Bonnie Hayes	4:48
8.	"Two Lights in the Nighttime" (feat. Ben Harper)	Lee Clayton; Pat McLaughlin	4:53
9.	"Well, Well, Well" (feat. Ben Harper)	Bob Dylan; Danny O'Keefe	3:55
10.	"Something to Talk About"	Shirley Eikhard	4:11
11.	"I Don't Want Anything to Change" (feat. Norah Jones)	Maia Sharp; Liz Rose; Stephanie Chapman	5:00
12.	"Love Sneakin' Up On You" (feat. Alison Krauss, Ben Harper, Jon Cleary, Keb' Mo' & Norah Jones)	Jimmy Scott; Tom Snow	4:56
Total length:			52:14

DVD
No.	Title	Writer(s)	Length
1.	"Unnecessarily Mercenary" (feat. Jon Cleary)	Jon Cleary	4:50
2.	"I Will Not Be Broken"	Gordon Kennedy; Wayne Kirkpatrick; Tommy Sims	3:43
3.	"God Was In The Water"	Randall Bramblett; Davis Causey	6:17
4.	"Gnawin' On It"	Bonnie Raitt; Roy Rogers	4:14
5.	"You" (feat. Alison Krauss)	John Shanks; Bob Thiele Jr.; Steven M. Krikorian	6:16
6.	"Papa Come Quick" (feat. Alison Krauss)	Billy Vera; Chip Taylor; Richard Hirsch	3:00
7.	"No Gettin' Over You" (feat. Keb' Mo')	Bonnie Raitt	6:06
8.	"Love Letter" (feat. Keb' Mo')	Bonnie Hayes	4:39
9.	"Crooked Crown"	David Batteau; Maia Sharp	4:32
10.	"Trinkets"	Emory Joseph	4:44
11.	"Two Lights In The Nighttime" (feat. Ben Harper)	Lee Clayton; Pat McLaughlin	5:33
12.	"Well, Well, Well" (feat. Ben Harper)	Bob Dylan; Danny O'Keefe	4:17
13.	"Something To Talk About"	Shirley Eikhard	3:55
14.	"Hear Me Lord"	Oliver Mtukudzi	5:57
15.	"I Don't Want Anything To Change" (feat. Norah Jones)	Maia Sharp; Liz Rose; Stephanie Chapman	5:03
16.	"Tennessee Waltz" (feat. Norah Jones)	Redd Stewart; Pee Wee King	5:21
17.	"Love Sneakin' Up On You" (feat. Alison Krauss, Ben Harper, Jon Cleary, Keb' Mo' & Norah Jones)	Jimmy Scott; Tom Snow	5:47
Total length:			84:14

== Personnel ==
- Bonnie Raitt: Vocals, Slide & Acoustic Guitar
- James "Hutch" Hutchinson: Bass & Vocals
- Ricky Fataar: Drums & Vocals
- George Marinelli: Guitar & Vocals
- Jon Cleary: Keyboards, Percussion & Vocals
- Norah Jones: Vocals & Wurlitzer Electric Piano on tracks 11 & 12
- Ben Harper: Vocals & Lap Slide Guitar on tracks 8, 9 & 12)
- Alison Krauss: Vocals & Fiddle on tracks 6 & 12
- Keb' Mo': Vocals & Electric Guitar on tracks 7 & 12

Production

- Project Producer: Kathy Kane
- Executive Producer: Barry Summers, Bonnie Raitt & Eric Sherman
- Supervising Producer: Barry Ehrmann
- Associate Producers: Annie Heller-Gutwillig & Rick Camino
- Mastered by Jeff King
- Mixed by Peter A. Barker
- Video Editor: Marc Schrobilgen
- Assistant Editors: Hannah Mayberry & Carmen Del Toro

Credits for musicians are for the CD. All track information and credits were taken from the DVD/CD liner notes.

== Certifications ==
Region	Certification	Certified units/sales
United States (RIAA)	Gold	50,000^{^}
^{^} Shipments figures based on certification alone.
