= Road Tested =

Live album by Bonnie Raitt
- Released: November 7, 1995
- Venues: Paramount Theatre (Oakland, California); Schnitzer Auditorium (Portland, Oregon)
- Genre: Rock
- Length: 100:19
- Label: Capitol
- Producers: Bonnie Raitt, Don Was

Bonnie Raitt chronology
Longing in Their Hearts (1994)	Road Tested (1995)	Fundamental (1998)

Professional ratings
Review scores
Source	Rating
Allmusic	4.5/5 stars
Entertainment Weekly	B
Q	3/5 stars
Robert Christgau	A−
Rolling Stone	3/5 stars

Road Tested is a live album and first live album by Bonnie Raitt, released in 1995.

== Track listing ==
CD One

1. "Thing Called Love" (John Hiatt) – 4:48
2. "Three Time Loser" (Don Covay, Ronald Dean Miller) – 3:39
3. "Love Letter" (Bonnie Hayes) – 4:37
4. "Never Make Your Move Too Soon" (Stix Hooper, Will Jennings) – 3:32
5. "Something to Talk About" (Shirley Eikhard) – 3:43
6. "Matters of the Heart" (Michael McDonald) – 4:58
7. "Shake a Little" (Michael Ruff) – 4:38
8. "Have a Heart" (Bonnie Hayes) – 5:45
9. "Love Me Like a Man" (Chris Smither) – 5:11
10. "The Kokomo Medley" (Mississippi Fred McDowell) – 4:59
11. "Louise" (Paul Siebel) – 3:46
12. "Dimming of the Day" (Richard Thompson) – 4:19

CD Two

1. "Longing in Their Hearts" (Bonnie Raitt, Michael O'Keefe) – 5:02
2. "Come to Me" (Raitt) – 5:02
3. "Love Sneakin' Up On You" (Jimmy Scott, Tom Snow) – 3:52
4. "Burning Down the House" (David Byrne, Chris Frantz, Jerry Harrison, Tina Weymouth) – 4:21
5. "I Can't Make You Love Me" (Mike Reid, James Allen Shamblin) – 6:00
6. "Feeling of Falling" (Raitt) – 6:45
7. "I Believe I'm in Love with You" (Kim Wilson) (with Kim Wilson)– 5:24
8. "Rock Steady" (Bryan Adams, Gretchen Peters) – 4:12
9. "My Opening Farewell" (Jackson Browne) – 4:57
10. "Angel from Montgomery" (John Prine) – 5:37

== Personnel ==
- Bonnie Raitt – vocals, slide guitar, acoustic guitar, keyboards (18)

Band

- Glen Clark – keyboards, harmonica, vocals, harmony vocals (13)
- Mark T. Jordan – keyboards, vocals, mandolin (5), harmony vocals (12)
- Benmont Tench – Hammond B3 organ
- Jamie Muhoberac – additional keyboards (15)
- Marty Grebb – acoustic piano (19)
- George Marinelli – acoustic guitar, electric guitar, vocals, mandolin (11)
- Keith Scott – tremolo guitar (20)
- James "Hutch" Hutchinson – bass guitar, vocals
- Ricky Fataar – drums
- Debra Dobkin – percussion, vocals

Guests

- Bruce Hornsby – accordion (1, 22), vocals (1, 22), acoustic piano (17)
- Charles Brown – acoustic piano (4), vocals (4)
- Ruth Brown – vocals (4)
- Kim Wilson – harmonica (4, 19), vocals (19, 22)
- Bryan Adams – guitar (20), vocals (20, 22)
- Jackson Browne – guitar (21), vocals (21, 22)

== Production ==
- Bonnie Raitt – producer
- Don Was – producer
- Ed Cherney – recording, mixing (1–19, 21, 22)
- Bob Clearmountain – mixing (20)
- Dan Bosworth – additional engineer
- Steve Beatty – recording assistant
- Phil Gitomer – recording assistant
- David Hewitt – recording assistant
- Sean McClintock – recording assistant
- Tom Banghart – mix assistant (1–19, 21, 22)
- Recorded live using Remote Recording Services' Silver Truck
- Chomsky Ranch (Los Angeles, California) – engineering location
- Brooklyn Recording Studio (Los Angeles, California) – mixing location
- Doug Sax – mastering at The Mastering Lab (Hollywood, California)
- Norman Moore – art direction, design, artwork
- Tommy Steele – art direction
- Jennifer George – design
- Lorraine Day – cover photography, additional photography
- Ken Friedman – additional photography
- Jeffrey Hersh – management
- Ron Stone – management

Stage and Tour Crew

- Robert Bennett – tour manager
- Lisa Van Valkenburgh – assistant tour manager
- Dan Cook – stage manager
- Doug Gherna – monitor engineer
- Paul Middleton – house sound engineer
- Peter Kudas – audio systems engineer
- John Tanasi – audio systems engineer
- Terry Lawless – keyboard technician
- John Gonzales – guitar technician
- John Cregar – drum technician
- John Cormier – lighting director
- Tom Thompson – lighting technician
- Mike Wheeler – lighting technician

== Charts ==
Album

Chart (1995–96)	Peak position
Australian Albums (ARIA)	142
Dutch Albums (MegaCharts)	62
Swiss Albums (Swiss Hitparade)	40
US Billboard 200	44

Album (Year-end)

Chart (1996)	Position
US Billboard 200	199

== Certifications ==
Region	Certification	Certified units/sales
Canada (Music Canada)	Gold	50,000^{^}
United States (RIAA)	Gold	500,000^{^}
^{^} Shipments figures based on certification alone.
