= James Hutchinson (musician) =

American session bassist (born 1953)

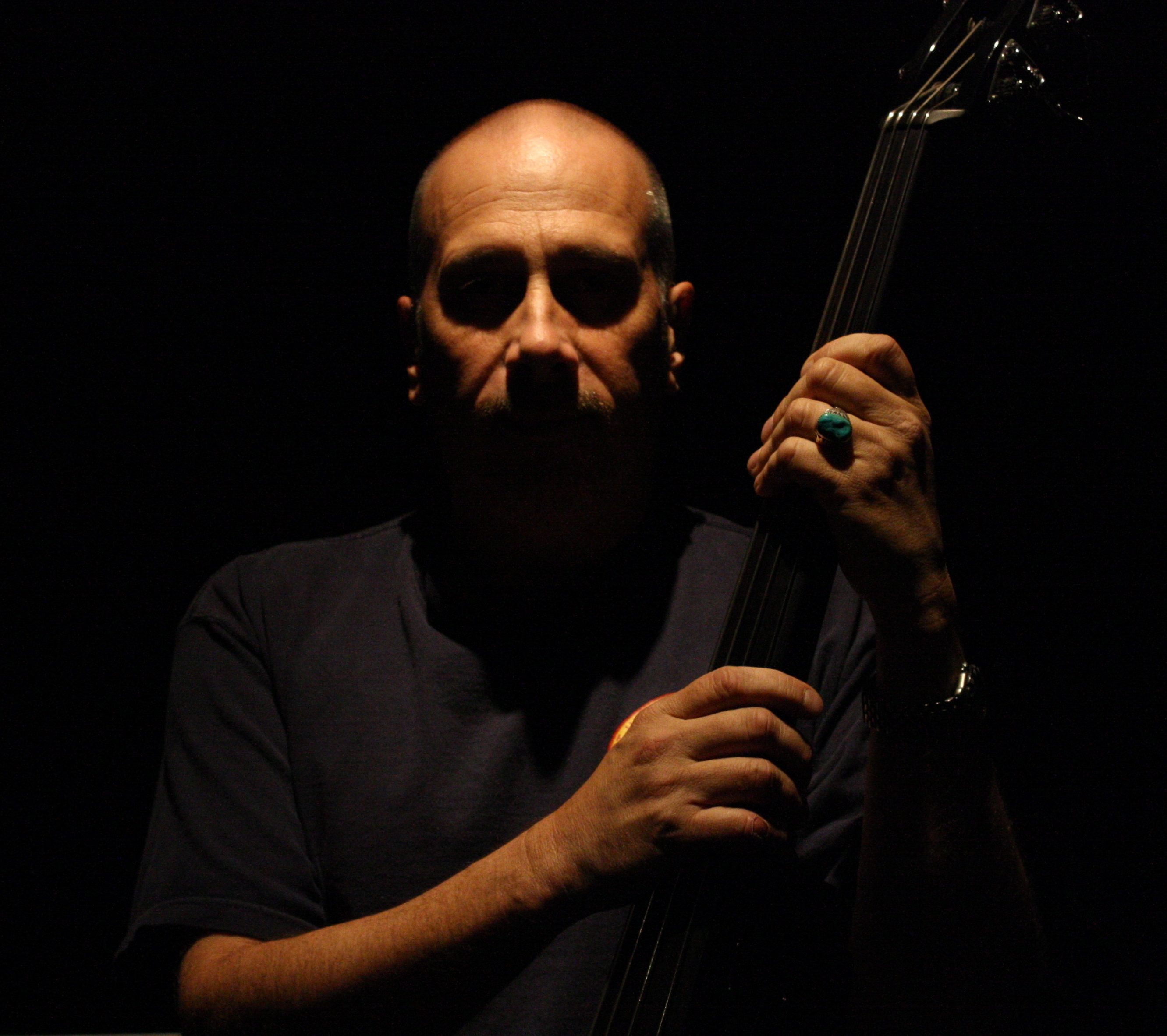

Background information
- Born: January 24, 1953 (age 73); Lynn, Massachusetts, U.S.
- Origin: Cambridge, Massachusetts; Somerville, Massachusetts; New Orleans, Louisiana, U.S.
- Genres: Rock; Blues-rock; World; Jazz; R&B; Country and Western
- Instruments: Bass guitar, double bass, guitar
- Years active: 1960s–present

James "Hutch" Hutchinson (born January 24, 1953) is an American session bassist best known for his work with Bonnie Raitt. Though his work takes him nearly everywhere he primarily resides in Studio City, Los Angeles, California, and Haiku-Pauwela, Hawaii.

Hutchinson has worked on hundreds of recordings, films and television shows and with artists as diverse as Willie Nelson, Joe Cocker, Bryan Adams, Ryan Adams, Jackson Browne, Ruth Brown, Charles Brown, Al Green, B. B. King, Earl King, The Neville Brothers, The Doobie Brothers, Ringo Starr, Ziggy Marley, Ozzy Osbourne and many more.

== Career ==
=== Early years ===
Hutchinson attended some classes at Berklee College of Music in the late 1960s. He always had an affinity for music and practiced various instruments as a child. After seeing Wilson Pickett's band, at age 12, he focused on the bass. His talent and drive allowed him the opportunity to play in a variety of New England bands throughout high school.

With his mother's blessing, he moved to San Francisco after completing high school. He eventually met John Cipollina (of Quicksilver Messenger Service) and Mickey Hart (of the Grateful Dead). Hutchinson joined Cipollina's band, Copperhead in 1972. He recorded an album with them in 1973 on Columbia Records. The band broke up in 1974. Later, he played in Link Wray's band with Copperhead drummer, David Weber, and performed with in a short lived project with both Wray and Cipollina.

=== Breakthrough ===
While living in Guatemala, Hutchinson worked in a multitude of Central American studios. He and violinist Sid Page formed a Latin jazz fusion group called The Point. After he brought the band to Austin, Texas, they would win Jazz Group of the year at the Austin Music Awards in 1977.

Meanwhile, in Austin in 1975, he was introduced to The Meters by a mutual friend. He later got a call from Charles and Art Neville about playing with their new band. He then moved to New Orleans and joined The Neville Brothers Band. While playing with the Neville Brothers on the Rolling Stones' Tattoo You tour (1981), he started a friendship with former Faces keyboardist Ian McLagan (who was then playing with The Rolling Stones) who shortly thereafter introduced him to Bonnie Raitt in New Orleans in 1982. He moved to Los Angeles in 1983 and joined her band after her previous bassist left days before a tour. He has been playing and recording with her ever since, contributing to every recording of hers since Nine Lives.

In 1992, while working in the studio with Bryan Adams in Paris, Hutchinson was invited by producer Don Was and Mick Jagger to head to Ron Wood's farm and studio in County Kildare, Ireland, to play and work on demos for the Voodoo Lounge record which he did as reported in the New York Post.

=== Later years ===
In 2006, Hutchinson was featured along with drummer Jim Keltner on the Jerry Lee Lewis recording Last Man Standing. Later that year he played shows with Bonnie Raitt opening for the Rolling Stones in Las Vegas, Los Angeles and Vancouver, British Columbia.

On February 2, 2009, he performed as bassist and co-music director (along with Chuck Leavell) at the Surf Ballroom in Clear Lake, Iowa, with an all-star band featuring Leavell, Stones sax man Bobby Keys, drummer Kenny Aronoff and Buddy Holly/Bob Wills guitarist Tommy Allsup at the Rock and Roll hall Of Fame's "50 Winters Later" concert in tribute to Buddy Holly, Ritchie Valens and the Big Bopper.

During the summer of 2009, Hutchinson joined BK3, a band led by Grateful Dead drummer Bill Kreutzmann, and completed a tour with them. During the summer and fall of 2009, he toured with Bonnie Raitt and Taj Mahal playing with both artists on The BonTaj Roulet tour.

In 2010, he completed a North American tour with the Hawaiian band Hapa, starting with them at Club Passim in Cambridge, Massachusetts, on St. Patrick's Day 2010 and finishing on April 17 that year at The Maui Arts and Cultural Center.

On April 10, 2011, he, Willie Nelson, Mick Fleetwood, Michael McDonald, and Patrick Simmons performed together, along with Hawaiian artists Jack Johnson, Jake Shimabukuro, Cecilio & Kapono, and many others on The Great Lawn of the Hawaiian Gardens in Honolulu at the benefit, Kokua For Japan, raising $1.6 million for the American Red Cross and survivors of the March 2011 earthquake, tsunami and resulting nuclear disaster in Japan.

On August 13, 2013, Hutchinson, along with drummer Steve Gadd was featured at the Paia Jam in Paia, Maui. In late October 2013, once again between legs of Raitt's Slipstream tour, Hutchinson along with Ricky Fataar returned to Hawaii for a pair of Halloween-themed shows with Allen Toussaint.

In July 2014, after finishing Raitt's summer tour, Hutchinson appeared on a number of west and east coast dates with Pegi Young and her band the Survivors (featuring Muscle Shoals writer and keyboard man Spooner Oldham) culminating with an appearance at the 2014 Newport Folk Festival. On October 25/26, 2014, he appeared again with Pegi Young and the Survivors at the Bridge School Benefit concert at Shoreline Amphitheatre. The same year, he also featured on Neil Diamond's Melody Road, Looking Into You: A Tribute to Jackson Browne (w/David Lindley and Bonnie Raitt), Jerry Lee Lewis's Rock and Roll Time, and the Grouch & Eligh's The Tortoise and the Crow.

In 2015, Hutchinson again toured with Raitt and on August 6, 2015, performed at Fenway Park in Boston with Raitt and James Taylor. The same year he played bass on Karen Lovely's album, Ten Miles of Bad Road.

In 2016, he played bass on Raitt's Dig In Deep and toured extensively in support the album. He also appeared on This Mountain, an EP by Pat Simmons Jr. which was produced by Patrick Simmons of the Doobie Brothers.

Hutchinson toured in 2017 with Raitt in Australia, New Zealand, Canada and throughout North America, including July–August with James Taylor. He also appeared on recordings by Curtis Salgado, Deb Ryder, Johnny Ray Jones, and others. In November he conducted a clinic at Bass Player Live, produced by Bass Player magazine and held annually at Studio Instrument Rentals in Hollywood. On New Year's Eve 2017 he performed again at Shep Gordon and Alice Cooper's Maui Food Bank Benefit in Wailea, Hawaii, playing with Steve Cropper, Dave Mason, Michael McDonald, Patrick Simmons, Ray Benson, Glen Sobel, and others.

During 2018, Hutchinson toured the U.S. extensively with Raitt, and in Europe with Raitt and Taylor. On July 15 they performed along with Paul Simon in Hyde Park, London, for a crowd in excess of 70,000 before heading off to Italy where they performed in the ancient amphitheater in Pompeii.

In 2019, Taylor and Raitt once more hit the road early in the year. Raitt and her band were featured performers for the third year in a row at The New Orleans Jazz & Heritage Festival as well as doing a series of their own dates including The Willie Nelson Outlaw Tour which culminated at Farm Aid held that year at the Alpine Valley Music Theatre in Wisconsin. Hutchinson was a featured Artist in the Playing for Change video "The Weight" along with Ringo Starr, Robbie Robertson, and others. Hutchinson finished the year performing at Shep's Maui Food Bank Benefit.

While working in the studio in early 2020 with Bonnie Raitt, Hutchinson appeared at Phil Lesh's Terrapin Crossroads in San Rafael, California, with the band Doobie Decimal System fronted by Roger McNamee and featuring multi-instrumentalist Jason Crosby. 2020 also saw the creation of Hokolele Studios in Haiku, Maui and collaborations with a number of artists in the US and overseas.

In 2021, he released a joint single and video entitled "Mighty Big Sur" with UK folk-rock singer Holly Lerski (formerly of the band Angelou) on which he wrote the music and played all of the instruments aside from the keyboards (performed by Glenn Patscha). He also recorded another record with Bonnie Raitt, (their 11th together) entitled Just Like That.... He also played both upright and electric bass on David Knopfler's Shooting for the Moon LP and electric bass on LP Fresh Bear Tracks by Richard T. Bear.

In 2022, Hutchinson toured the U.S. with Raitt in support of the album Just Like That... which debuted at number one on six different Billboard charts and sat atop the Americana charts for months after its release in April 2022. He also appeared on a new recording by Canadian artist Devin Townsend entitled Lightwork and on the David Knopfler records Shooting For The Moon and Skating On The Lake, both of which were released in 2022.

Raitt & Band along with Hutchinson continued to tour the U.S. and in 2023 also headed to Ireland, UK, Canada, Hawaii and Australia. "Just Like That..." on February 5, 2023, won three 2022 Grammy Awards for Song of The Year. Americana Performance and Americana Song of The Year. He also once again in late December performed at Shep Gordon and Alice Cooper's Annual Maui benefit concert performing with Sammy Hagar, Alice Cooper, Mick Fleetwood, Richie Sambora and Mike Myers.

In 2024, Hutchinson continued to tour across the U.S. with Raitt & Her Band in support of the Grammy winning album Just Like That. He also along with drummer Abe Laboriel Jr. recorded new material for former Bon Jovi guitarist Richie Sambora with producer Bob Rock at the helm, including the single "Miracles". He also appeared on a new recording by UK artist David Knopfler entitled Crow Gifts. playing electric and double bass.

== Influences ==
Some of Hutchinson's main influences are Percy Heath, Paul Chambers, Chuck Rainey, Carl Radle, Klaus Voormann, Tommy Cogbill, Rick Danko, George Porter Jr., John Entwistle, Carol Kaye, and Jack Casady.

== Partial discography ==
With Ryan Adams

- Love Is Hell (Lost Highway Records, 2004)

With Jann Arden

- Happy (A&M Records, 1997)

With The B-52s

- Good Stuff (Reprise Records, 1992)

With Garth Brooks

- The Life of Chris Gaines (Capitol Records, 1999)

With Jackson Browne

- I'm Alive (Elektra Records, 1993)

With Pieta Brown

- In the Cool (Valley Entertainment, 2005)

With Eric Burdon

- My Secret Life (SPV, 2004)
- Soul of a Man (SPV, 2006)

With Felix Cavaliere

- Dreams in Motion (MCA Records, 1994)

With Joe Cocker

- Organic (550 Music, 1996)
- Across from Midnight (CMC International, 1997)

With Marc Cohn

- The Rainy Season (Atlantic Records, 1993)

With David Crosby

- It's All Coming Back to Me Now... (Atlantic Records, 1995)
- CPR (Sampson, 1998)

With Crosby, Stills & Nash

- After the Storm (Atlantic Records, 1994)

With Crosby, Stills, Nash & Young

- Looking Forward (Atlantic Records, 1999)

With Neil Diamond

- Melody Road (Capitol Records, 2014)

With The Doobie Brothers

- World Gone Crazy (HOR, 2010)

With Tim Easton

- Break Your Mother's Heart (New West Records, 2003)

With Terry Evans

- Blues for Thought (Point Blank Records, 1994)

With Colin James

- Bad Habits (Warner Music Canada, 1995)
- Limelight (MapleMusic Recordings, 2005)
- 15 (EMI Records, 2012)

With Etta James

- Seven Year Itch (Island Records, 1989)

With Elton John

- Duets (Geffen, 1993)

With B.B. King

- Deuces Wild (MCA Records, 1997)

With David Knopfler

- Wishbones (Edel, 2001)
- Shooting For The Moon (Paris Records, 2022)
- Skating On The Lake (Paris Records, 2022)
- Crow Gifts (Paris Records, 2024)

With Taj Mahal

- Phantom Blues (RCA Victor, 1996)

With Ziggy Marley and the Melody Makers

- Spirit of Music (Elektra Records, 1999)

With Delbert McClinton

- Never Been Rocked Enough (Curb, 1992)
- One of the Fortunate Few (Rising Tide, 1997)
- Nothing Personal (New West, 2001)

With Keb' Mo'

- Keb' Mo' (Epic Records, 1994)
- Just like You (Epic Records, 1996)

With Maria Muldaur

- Meet Me at Midnite (Black Top Records, 1994)
- Fanning the Flames (Telarc, 1996)
- Southland of the Heart (Telarc, 1998)
- Maria Muldaur's Music for Lovers (Telarc, 2000)
- Heart of Mine: Maria Muldaur Sings Love Songs of Bob Dylan (Telarc, 2006)

With Anne Murray

- Anne Murray (EMI, 1996)

With Willie Nelson

- Across the Borderline (Columbia Records, 1993)
- Outlaws and Angels (Lost Highway, 2004)

With Ivan Neville

- If My Ancestors Could See Me Now (Polydor Records, 1988)
- Thanks (Iguana Records, 1995)
- Saturday Morning Music (UpTop Entertainment, 2002)
- Scrape (Evangeline Recorded Works, 2004)

With Randy Newman

- Randy Newman's Faust (Reprise Records, 1995)
- Toy Story (soundtrack) (Walt Disney Records, 1995)

With Roy Orbison

- King of Hearts (Virgin Records, 1992)

With Bonnie Raitt

- Nick of Time (Capitol Records, 1989)
- Luck of the Draw (Capitol Records, 1991)
- Longing in Their Hearts (Capitol Records, 1994)
- Road Tested (Capitol Records, 1995)
- Fundamental (Capitol Records, 1998)
- Silver Lining (Capitol Records, 2002)
- Souls Alike (Capitol Records, 2005)
- Decades Rock Live: Bonnie Raitt and Friends (Capitol Records, 1996)
- Slipstream (Redwing Records, 2012)
- Dig In Deep (Redwing Records, 2016)
- Just Like That... (Redwing Records, 2022)

With Johnny Rivers

- Last Train to Memphis (Soul City, 1998)

With Linda Ronstadt

- We Ran (Elektra Records, 1998)

With Richie Sambora

- Undiscovered Soul (Mercury Records, 1998)

With Boz Scaggs

- Some Change (Virgin Records, 1994)
- Fade Into Light (MVP Japan, 1996)
- Come on Home (Virgin Records, 1997)

With Bob Seger

- The Fire Inside (Capitol Records, 1991)

With Pops Staples

- Peace to the Neighborhood (Point Blank Records, 1992)

With Ringo Starr

- Time Takes Time (Private Music, 1992)

With Brian Wilson

- I Just Wasn't Made for These Times (MCA Records, 1995)

With Paul Young

- The Crossing (Columbia Records, 1993)
