= Just Like That (Bonnie Raitt song) =

Song by Bonnie Raitt

from the album Just Like That...
- Released: April 22, 2022
- Genre: Folk
- Length: 5:05
- Label: Redwing
- Songwriter: Bonnie Raitt
- Producer: Bonnie Raitt

Lyric video
- "Bonnie Raitt - Just Like That" on YouTube

"Just Like That" is a song by American singer and multi-instrumentalist Bonnie Raitt and is the title track of her eighteenth studio album, Just Like That..., which was released on April 22, 2022, by Redwing Records. The song was written and produced by Raitt and lyrically details the story of a woman who is visited by the recipient of her son's heart, which he received in a life-saving organ donation operation.

The song won Best American Roots Song and Song of the Year at the 65th Annual Grammy Awards, with the latter award regarded as an upset over several higher-charting songs. Following the ceremony, the song experienced a surge in streams and digital sales, leading it to enter several Billboard charts the following week. It gave Raitt her first number one single on the Rock Digital Song Sales chart and peaked at number 26 on the Hot Rock & Alternative Songs chart.

== Composition ==
In an interview with American Songwriter, Raitt explained that her initial inspiration for the song came after she saw a human interest piece on the news in 2018 about a woman who donated her deceased child's organs and was meeting the man who received his heart. The segment moved Raitt to the degree that she was compelled to write a song about the selfless act, noting "I just lost it. It was the most moving and surprising thing. I wasn't expecting it. I vowed right then that I wanted to write a song about what that would take. Every time I hear about a family donating organs when their child has been killed, or there's some sort of sudden death — as if you're not in grief and shock enough — to have the view and the compassion and the love to be able to pay it forward like that is so incredible". During her Grammy acceptance speech, she explained "I was so inspired for this song by the incredible story of the love and the grace and the generosity of someone that donates their beloved's organs to help another person live and this story was so simple and so beautiful for these times".

Raitt stated that the song was inspired by the death of her longtime friend and fellow performer John Prine, who died in 2020 after complications from COVID-19. She singled out his song "Angel of Montgomery" as particularly inspiring, noting that he "crept into the heart of the woman that was singing" the song when he was a 21-year old man. Raitt composed the guitar part of the song while on tour, shortly after Prine's passing, and reflected to The New York Times that she had Prine "in my heart. I just started fingerpicking, and I had the lyrics in front of me, and the song poured through me without any thinking about it." While reviewing Just Like That…, critic Robert Christgau commented that both the title track and "Down the Hall" suggested that "Raitt is missing John Prine even more than the rest of us". In another interview with American Songwriter, Raitt commented that she tends to focus on her personal experiences when writing story songs, so for "Just Like That" and "Down the Hall", she sought to look to the experiences of others.

== Accolades ==
"Just Like That" won both the Best American Roots Song and the all-genre Song of the Year at the 65th Annual Grammy Awards. Raitt's win in the latter category made her the first person to win with a solo composition since Amy Winehouse's "Rehab" in 2008, and was noted by critics as a shock victory, as she beat out popular frontrunners Adele, Taylor Swift, Beyoncé, Lizzo, and Harry Styles. At the time of the awards ceremony, the song had one-sixtieth the number of Spotify streams of the second-least streamed Song of the Year nominee, DJ Khaled's "God Did", and was the only one out of the ten nominees not to have peaked within the top 20 of the Billboard Hot 100. The Guardian referred to Raitt as "the unexpected winner… over modern titans such as Beyoncé and Taylor Swift." The week after her victory, Raitt published an open letter thanking listeners for sharing their own experiences with organ donation.

Almost eight months later, Raitt also won Song of the Year for "Just Like That" at the 2023 Americana Music Honors & Awards. With the win, Raitt became the first solo songwriter to win Song of the Year since 2018, when Jason Isbell's "If We Were Vampires" won.

== Commercial performance ==
Following the Grammy Awards, "Just Like That" experienced large gains in sales and streaming figures. On February 6, the day after the Grammys, daily US streams of the song rose by 6,700 percent to 697,000 from a pre-Grammy total of about 10,000 per day. The song's daily sales rose by over 10,000 percent, to 4,550 copies the day after the Grammys, reaching number 2 on the iTunes real-time sales chart. The song ultimately sold 9,000 digital downloads in the tracking week from 3 to 9 February, an increase of 9,947 percent over the prior week, as well as recording 1.4 million US streams, an increase of 2,955 percent. The song also experienced gains in airplay, with Raitt releasing a shortened radio edit, which received 144 spins in the two weeks following the win. Raitt's manager noted that, in contrast with their strategy for Just Like That…, they decided against a promotional campaign for the song at radio, instead simply releasing the radio edit and allowing stations to put it in rotation.

The week following her Grammy win, "Just Like That" entered multiple Billboard charts. On the Hot Rock & Alternative Songs chart dated 18 February 2023, the song debuted at number 26, giving Raitt her second entry on the chart. The song debuted at number one on the Rock Digital Song Sales chart, giving Raitt her second number-one song on a Billboard chart, following "One Belief Away", which topped the Adult Alternative Airplay chart in 1998. It also debuted within the top 10 of the all-genre Digital Song Sales chart, her second entry and first top 10 on that chart. The song's win also led to increased sales of Raitt's album, Just Like That..., which moved 7,000 equivalent album units and re-entered the Top Rock & Alternative Albums chart. Outside of the US, it debuted at number 11 on the Canadian Digital Song Sales chart and number 20 on the Japan Hot Overseas chart. Billboard estimated that in the two weeks following the Grammy Awards, Raitt had earned about $6,000 in publishing royalties from the song, as much as it had earned in the nine months preceding the awards ceremony.

== Charts ==
Chart performance for "Just Like That"
| Chart (2023) | Peak position |
|---|---|
| Canadian Digital Song Sales (Billboard) | 11 |
| Japan Hot Overseas (Billboard Japan) | 20 |
| US Digital Song Sales (Billboard) | 6 |
| US Hot Rock & Alternative Songs (Billboard) | 26 |
