= Rock Steady (Bonnie Raitt and Bryan Adams song) =

1995 single by Bonnie Raitt with Bryan Adams

Single by Bonnie Raitt with Bryan Adams

from the album Road Tested
- Released: October 23, 1995
- Genre: Rock
- Length: 4:12
- Label: Capitol
- Songwriters: Bryan Adams; Gretchen Peters
- Producers: Don Was; Bonnie Raitt

Bonnie Raitt singles chronology
"You Got It" (1995)	"Rock Steady" (1995)	"One Belief Away" (1998)

Bryan Adams singles chronology
"Have You Ever Really Loved a Woman?" (1995)	"Rock Steady" (1995)	"The Only Thing That Looks Good on Me Is You" (1996)

"Rock Steady" is a song from American blues singer Bonnie Raitt's first live album, Road Tested (1995), written by Bryan Adams and Gretchen Peters. The song was written as a duet with Adams and Raitt for her Road Tested Tour, which also became one of her albums. The original demo version of the song appears on Adams' 1996 single "Let's Make a Night to Remember". It was officially released via Capitol Records on October 23, 1995, to AOR radio. The song reached number 17 in Adams' native Canada and entered the top 50 in the Flanders region of Belgium and the United Kingdom.

== Critical reception ==
Pan-European magazine Music & Media named "Rock Steady" Single of the Week, writing, "What a brilliant idea to put these two together! A moaning bottleneck riff rips open this track, which has "classic" stomped all over it. Rait's bluesy feel and Adams' R&R pedigree fuse into a perfect rock song, which will energise radio listeners at any time of the day."

== Charts ==
=== Weekly charts ===
Chart (1995–1996)	Peak position
Australia (ARIA)	117
Belgium (Ultratop 50 Flanders)	45
Canada Top Singles (RPM)	17
Canada Adult Contemporary (RPM)	5
Europe (European Hit Radio)	23
Netherlands (Dutch Top 40 Tipparade)	10
UK Singles (Official Charts)	50
US Billboard Hot 100	73
US Adult Contemporary (Billboard)	30
US Adult Pop Airplay (Billboard)	25
US Cash Box Top 100	50

=== Year-end charts ===
Chart (1996)	Position
Canada Adult Contemporary (RPM)	81

== Release history ==
Release dates and format(s) for "Rock Steady"
Region	Date	Format(s)	Label(s)	Ref.
United States	October 23, 1995	Album-oriented rock radio	Capitol	
United Kingdom	October 30, 1995	CD; cassette single	Capitol	
