= Dig In Deep =

Studio album by Bonnie Raitt
- Released: February 26, 2016
- Studios: Henson Recording Studios (Hollywood, California); Stampede Origin (Culver City, California); The Garfield House (Pasadena, California)
- Genres: Blues rock, blues, Americana
- Length: 52:24
- Label: Redwing Records
- Producers: Bonnie Raitt; Joe Henry

Bonnie Raitt chronology
| Slipstream (2012) | Dig In Deep (2016) | Just Like That... (2022) |

Dig In Deep is the seventeenth studio album by American singer and songwriter Bonnie Raitt. The album was released on February 26, 2016. The album once again primarily features her longtime band composed of Ricky Fataar on drums, George Marinelli on guitars and James "Hutch" Hutchinson on bass with newer member Mike Finnigan on keyboards.

== Critical reception ==
Professional ratings
Aggregate scores
| Source | Rating |
|---|---|
| Metacritic | 82/100 |
Review scores
| Source | Rating |
| AllMusic | 4/5 stars |
| American Songwriter | 4/5 stars |
| Chicago Tribune | 3/5 stars |
| Consequence of Sound | B |
| Exclaim! | 8/10 |
| Entertainment Weekly | B+ |
| Paste | 8.8/10 |
| PopMatters | 7/10 |
| Rolling Stone | 3.5/5 stars |

Dig In Deep received generally positive reviews from music critics and at Metacritic, which assigns a normalized rating out of 100 to reviews from mainstream critics, the album received an average score of 82 based on 17 reviews, which indicates "universal acclaim". The album earned Raitt a nomination for "Artist of the Year" at the 2016 Americana Music Honors & Awards.

=== Accolades ===
| Publication | Accolade | Year | Rank |
|---|---|---|---|
| American Songwriter | Top 50 Albums of 2016 | 2016 | 25 |

== Track listing ==
| No. | Title | Writer(s) | Length |
|---|---|---|---|
| 1. | "Unintended Consequence of Love" | Jon Cleary, Bonnie Raitt | 4:49 |
| 2. | "Need You Tonight" | Andrew Farriss, Michael Hutchence | 3:19 |
| 3. | "I Knew" | Pat McLaughlin | 4:00 |
| 4. | "All Alone with Something to Say" | Steven Dale Jones, Gordon Kennedy | 3:11 |
| 5. | "What You're Doin' to Me" | Raitt | 4:53 |
| 6. | "Shakin' Shakin' Shakes" | T Bone Burnett, Cesar Rosas | 4:50 |
| 7. | "Undone" | Bonnie Bishop | 4:12 |
| 8. | "If You Need Somebody" | George Marinelli, Raitt | 5:10 |
| 9. | "Gypsy in Me" | Gordon Kennedy, Wayne Kirkpatrick | 4:09 |
| 10. | "The Comin' Round Is Going Through" | Marinelli, Raitt | 5:28 |
| 11. | "You've Changed My Mind" | Joseph Lee Henry | 4:08 |
| 12. | "The Ones We Couldn't Be" | Raitt | 4:14 |

== Personnel ==
- Bonnie Raitt – lead vocals, electric slide guitar (1–3, 6–10), electric guitar (4), acoustic piano (5, 12), percussion (8), backing vocals (8), arrangements (12)
- Mike Finnigan – Hammond B3 organ (1–3, 5–10), clavinet (2), keyboards (3, 7), backing vocals (5, 6, 9), electric piano (9)
- George Marinelli – electric guitars (1–10), backing vocals (3, 6, 9, 10), acoustic guitar (4), finger snaps (4)
- James "Hutch" Hutchinson – bass guitar (1–10)
- Ricky Fataar – drums (1–10), percussion (1–9, 11), finger snaps (4), backing vocals (10)

with:

- Jon Cleary – electric piano (1), backing vocals (1, 5)
- Patrick Warren – keyboards (11, 12), arrangements (12)
- Bill Frisell – electric guitar (11)
- Greg Leisz – acoustic guitar (11)
- Joe Henry – acoustic guitar (11)
- David Piltch – acoustic bass (11)
- Jay Bellerose – drums (11)
- Arnold McCuller – backing vocals (4, 8, 9)
- Maia Sharp – backing vocals (4, 8)

== Production ==
- Producers – Bonnie Raitt (Tracks 1–10 & 12); Joe Henry (Track 11).
- Recorded and Mixed by Ryan Freeland
- Second Engineer – Pablo Hernandez
- Third Engineer – Josh Simmons
- Digital Technician – Boyz Bieber
- Mixed at Stampede Origin (Culver City, California)
- Mastered by Kim Rosen at Knack Mastering (Ringwood, NJ).
- Project Coordinator – Kathy Kane
- Art Direction and Design – Norman Moore at DesignartLA.com.
- Photography – Marina Chavez, Molly Bosted, Linda Posnick and Jason Farrell.
- Video Editor – Jason Farrell
- Make-up – Lori Depp
- Stylist – Kate Lindsey
- Prop Stylists – David Browne and Eddie Burke
- Management and Label – Kathy Kane, assisted by Annie Heller-Gutwillig and Chloe Monahan.
- Bass and Guitar Wrangler – Manny Alvarez

== Charts ==
| Chart | Peak position |
|---|---|
| Australian Albums (ARIA) | 70 |
| Belgian Albums (Ultratop Flanders) | 29 |
| Canadian Albums (Billboard) | 37 |
| Dutch Albums (MegaCharts) | 23 |
| Swiss Albums (Schweizer Hitparade) | 80 |
| UK Albums (OCC) | 35 |
| UK Americana (OCC) | 1 |
| US Billboard 200 | 11 |
| US Americana (AMA) | 1 |
| US Blues (Billboard) | 1 |
| US Folk (Billboard) | 1 |
| US Rock (Billboard) | 3 |
