= The Bros. Landreth =

Canadian country/folk music group

- Origin: Winnipeg, Manitoba, Canada
- Genres: Alternative country; folk rock; rock
- Years active: 2013–present
- Labels: Slate Creek Records; Birthday Cake Records
- Members: Joey Landreth; David Landreth
- Past members: Alex Campbell; Cody Iwasiuk; Ryan Voth; Ariel Posen
- Website: thebroslandreth.com

The Bros. Landreth are a Canadian alternative country and folk music group. Their debut album Let It Lie won the Juno Award for Roots & Traditional Album of the Year – Group at the Juno Awards of 2015.

The group was first formed in 2013 by brothers Joey and David Landreth, the sons of Winnipeg musician Wally Landreth. The brothers share vocal duties, while Joey plays guitar and David plays bass. The initial band lineup also included Alex Campbell on piano and Ryan Voth on drums. The band has also toured with musicians Ariel Posen on second guitar, Cody Iwasiuk, Curtis Nowosad and Michael Carbone on drums, and Liam Duncan and Darryl "Duke" Havers on keys.

Let It Lie was released independently in 2013. In 2014, the band signed an American distribution deal with Slate Creek Records, who rereleased the album in the United States and Europe in January 2015.

At the 10th Canadian Folk Music Awards in 2014, the band won the award for New/Emerging Artist of the Year, and Let It Lie was a nominee for Contemporary Album of the Year. The band was nominated for Songwriter Of The Year and Roots Group Recording Of The Year at the Western Canadian Music Awards.

The band have toured both Canada and the United States. They attracted additional media attention when American rock icon John Oates agreed to perform as an opening act for the band at a 2015 tour stop in Nashville.

In 2019 the band released their album 87.

On February 24, 2022, Bonnie Raitt released a cover of "Made Up Mind", which appears on her album Just Like That.... Her recording of the song won a Grammy Award for Best Americana Performance at the 65th Annual Grammy Awards in 2023.

The band released the album Dog Ear on 14 November 2025. The album features two collaborations with Bonnie Raitt.

== Personal lives ==
David Landreth is married to Roberta Hansen, an artist and designer who also won a Juno Award in 2015, in the Recording Package of the Year category, for her work on Steve Bell's album Pilgrimage.
