= Some Change =

Studio album by Boz Scaggs
- Released: 1994
- Genres: Rock, pop
- Label: Virgin
- Producers: Boz Scaggs; Ricky Fataar

Boz Scaggs chronology
Other Roads (1988)	Some Change (1994)	Fade into Light (1996)

Some Change is an album by the American musician Boz Scaggs, released in 1994.

== Critical reception ==
Professional ratings
Review scores
Source	Rating
AllMusic	4.5/5 stars
Entertainment Weekly	B−
(The New) Rolling Stone Album Guide	3.5/5 stars

Entertainment Weekly deemed the album "a competent snooze for closet New Age fans."

AllMusic's retrospective review called Some Change "a very honest and natural-sounding collection of pop, pop/rock, and soul-influenced pop" and "his best album since 1976's Silk Degrees."

== Track listing ==
All songs are written by Boz Scaggs unless noted.

1. "You Got My Letter" - 4:23
2. "Some Change" - 6:11
3. "I'll Be the One" - 5:29
4. "Call Me" (Robben Ford, Michael Omartian, Scaggs) - 3:18
5. "Fly Like a Bird" - 3:35
6. "Sierra" - 5:21
7. "Lost It" - 5:52
8. "Time" - 4:18
9. "Illusion" (Marcus Miller, Scaggs) - 5:28
10. "Follow That Man" - 5:51

== Personnel ==
- Boz Scaggs – vocals, keyboards, guitars, bass (5)
- Michael Rodriguez – programming
- Ricky Fataar – keyboards, drums, accordion (5), organ (5)
- Austin de Lone – acoustic piano (1)
- Booker T. Jones – Hammond B3 organ (2)
- William "Smitty" Smith – organ solo (5)
- Barry Beckett – acoustic piano (7)
- Michael Omartian – synthesizers (7), organ solo (7)
- Kevin Bents – Rhodes electric piano (7, 9, 10)
- Fred Tackett – rhythm guitar (2), acoustic guitar (6)
- James "Hutch" Hutchinson – bass guitar (2, 8)
- Nathan East – bass guitar (6, 9, 10)
- Neil Stubenhaus – bass guitar (7)

== Production ==
- Producers – Boz Scaggs and Ricky Fataar
- Co-producer on Tracks 4 & 7 – Barry Beckett
- Engineers – Richard Dodd (Track 1), Dan Garcia and Paul McKenna (Tracks 2–10)
- Digital Editing and Additional Engineering – Michael Rodriguez
- Mixed by Richard Dodd
- Mix Assistant – Karl Derfler
- Mastered by Bernie Grundman at Bernie Grundman Mastering (Hollywood, California)
- Art Direction – Len Peltier
- Design – Tom Dolan
- Photography – Jean-Baptiste Mondino
