= Silver Lining (Bonnie Raitt album) =

Studio album by Bonnie Raitt
- Released: April 9, 2002
- Studio: The Sound Factory (Hollywood, California); Real World Studios (Wiltshire, England)
- Genre: Rock
- Length: 51:12
- Label: Capitol
- Producer: Bonnie Raitt; Tchad Blake; Mitchell Froom

Bonnie Raitt chronology
Fundamental (1998)	Silver Lining (2002)	Souls Alike (2005)

Alternate cover

Professional ratings
Aggregate scores
Source	Rating
Metacritic	(74/100)
Review scores
Source	Rating
Allmusic	3.5/5 stars
Billboard	(favorable)
Blender	2/5 stars
New Zealand Herald	3/5 stars
Los Angeles Times	3/5 stars
PopMatters	(favourable)
Los Angeles Daily News	4/5 stars
Robert Christgau	B−
Rolling Stone	3.5/5 stars
USA Today	3/4 stars

Silver Lining is the fourteenth studio album by Bonnie Raitt, released in 2002 on Capitol Records. The album peaked at No. 13 on the US Billboard 200. Silver Lining has also been certified Gold in the US by the RIAA.

== Critical reception ==
Silver Lining received generally positive reviews from music critics. At Metacritic, which assigns a normalized rating out of 100 to reviews from mainstream critics, the album received an average score of 74 based on 11 reviews, which indicates "generally favourable reviews".

Edna Gundersen of USA Today wrote, "Silver Lining, produced by Mitchell Froom and Tchad Blake, showcases Raitt's knack for pop elegance in such tunes as the title track (by David Gray) and aching ballad Wounded Heart. But it also proves Raitt isn't afraid to get a little Delta mud under her fingernails in pursuit of pure funk and earthy grooves. Less polished than recent efforts, the album has a loose, raucous party vibe that never resorts to sloppy shortcuts. Slabs of boogie, gospelized R&B and raw blues recall the organic might of the Meters and Little Feat yet crackle with freshness and vitality." Jason MacNeil of PopMatters proclaimed "While it doesn't contain the radio friendly tracks of past classics like "Thing Called Love" or "Something To Talk About", the album as a whole is definitely one of her strongest to date."

Natalie Nichols of Los Angeles Times claimed "Raitt continues to explore common threads in music across cultures with her 16th album. Yet "Silver Lining" is no academic exercise, but a varied collection incorporating her trademark Delta-influenced blues-rock, African styles, New Orleans boogie and modern adult-pop elements."

What's more two songs from Silver Lining, Gnawin' On It and Time of Our Lives, earned Grammy nominations in the category of Best Female Rock Vocal Performance.

== Singles ==
Singles "I Can't Help You Now" peaked at No. 15 and "Silver Lining" got to No. 21 on the US Billboard Adult Contemporary Songs chart. Another song from the album, called "Time of Our Lives", also got to No. 27 on that said chart.

== Track listing ==
1. "Fool's Game" (Jon Cleary) – 4:08
2. "I Can't Help You Now" (Gordon Kennedy, Wayne Kirkpatrick, Tommy Sims) – 3:13
3. "Silver Lining" (David Gray) – 6:19
4. "Time of Our Lives" (Teron Beal, Tommy Sims) – 4:00
5. "Gnawin' on It" (Raitt, Roy Rogers) – 4:44
6. "Monkey Business" (Jon Cleary) – 3:36
7. "Wherever You May Be" (Alan Darby, Gavin Hodgson) – 5:31
8. "Valley of Pain" (Rob Mathes, Allen Shamblin) – 4:27
9. "Hear Me Lord" (Oliver "Tuku" Mtukudzi) – 5:09
10. "No Gettin' Over You" (Raitt) – 4:45
11. "Back Around" (Habib Koité, Raitt) – 5:15
12. "Wounded Heart" (Jude Johnstone) – 4:13

== Personnel ==
- Bonnie Raitt – vocals, electric guitar, slide guitar, backing vocals (1), organ arrangements (3), horn arrangements (5)
- Jon Cleary – keyboards, acoustic piano, Wurlitzer electric piano, clavinet, synthesizers, Hammond B3 organ, Moog synthesizer, backing vocals (1, 2), duet vocals (6)
- George Marinelli – acoustic guitar, electric guitar, harmony vocals (3), backing vocals (9), mandolin (10)
- James "Hutch" Hutchinson – bass guitar (1–10, 12), acoustic bass (11)
- Ricky Fataar – drums, percussion, backing vocals (9)

Additional musicians

- Mitchell Froom – Moog synthesizer (2), clavinet (2), marxophone (3), additional acoustic piano (3), reed organ (3), Wurlitzer electric piano (4), organ (4, 7, 8, 12), synthesizers (7)
- Benmont Tench – acoustic piano (12)
- Roy Rogers – slide guitar (5)
- Andy Abad – lead guitar (9)
- Habib Koité – gut-string guitar (11)
- Andrew Scheps – drum loops (2)
- Gary Gold – drum loops (2–4, 7), snare drum (5)
- Pete Thomas – percussion (8)
- Alex Acuña – congas (9), talking drum (9)
- Souleymane Ann – calabash (11)
- Mahamadou Kone – talking drum (11)
- Kélétigui Diabaté – balafon (11)
- Steve Berlin – baritone saxophone (5, 6)
- Freebo – tuba (10)
- Steve Raitt – backing vocals (1)
- Bernard Fowler – backing vocals (2, 4)
- Tommy Sims – backing vocals (2, 4, 9), electric guitar (4)
- Arnold McCuller – backing vocals (7)
- Fred White – backing vocals (7)

== Production ==
- Bonnie Raitt – producer
- Mitchell Froom – producer
- Tchad Blake – producer, recording (1–10, 12), mixing, black and white photography
- Jacquie Blake – recording assistant (1–10, 12), mix assistant (1, 3–12), ProTools engineer
- John Paterno – additional overdub recording (2), recording (11)
- Craig Conrad – overdub assistant (2)
- Claire Lewis – mix assistant (2)
- Adam Samuels – recording assistant (11)
- Tom Corwin – pre-production assistant
- Bob Ludwig – mastering at Gateway Mastering (Portland, Maine)
- Kathy Kane – production coordinator, management
- Ky Cabot – production manager
- Norman Moore – art direction, design
- Ann Cutting – cover photography, additional photography
- Henry Diltz – additional photography
- Pat Johnson – additional photography
- Kate Lindsay – stylist
- Lucienne Zammit – make-up
- Ron Stone – management
- Annie Heller-Gutwillig – management assistance
- Melissa Masi – management assistance

== Charts ==
=== Weekly charts ===
Chart (2002)	Peak position
US Billboard 200	13

=== Year-end charts ===
Chart (2002)	Position
US Billboard 200	182

== Certifications ==
Region	Certification	Certified units/sales
United States (RIAA)	Gold	500,000^{^}
^{^} Shipments figures based on certification alone.
