= Fade into Light =

Fade Into Light

Studio album by Boz Scaggs
- Released: November 19, 1996 (Japan); September 27, 2005 (U.S.)
- Recorded: MEAC Studio (San Francisco, California): Skywalker Sound (Nicasio, California); The Sound House (Hollywood, California); O'Henry Sound Studios (Burbank, California)
- Genre: Pop, rock
- Length: 54:23
- Label: MVP Japan
- Producer: Boz Scaggs: Michael Omartian; Ricky Fataar

Boz Scaggs chronology
Some Change (1994)	Fade Into Light (1996)	Come On Home (1997)

Professional ratings
Review scores
Source	Rating
Allmusic	4.5/5 stars
Rolling Stone	3.5/5 stars

Fade into Light is the twelfth studio album by American musician Boz Scaggs, released in Japan in 1996 and the U.S. in 2005. The album was a mix of new original compositions and new recordings of Scaggs' classic hits.

== 1996 release track list ==
All songs are written by Boz Scaggs unless noted.

1. "Lowdown" (Unplugged) (Boz Scaggs, David Paich) - 5:35
2. "Some Things Happen" (Boz Scaggs, Marcus Miller) - 4:47
3. "Just Go" - 2:59
4. "Fade Into Light" - 4:32
5. "Harbor Lights" (Unplugged) - 6:45
6. "Lost It" (Valley Version) - 5:05
7. "Time" - 4:16
8. "Sierra" - 5:21
9. "We're All Alone" (Unplugged) - 4:02
10. "Simone" (Boz Scaggs, David Foster) - 6:57
11. "I'll Be the One" (Remix) - 3:49

== 2005 release track list ==
1. "Lowdown" (Unplugged) (Boz Scaggs, David Paich) - 5:38
2. "Some Things Happen" (Boz Scaggs, Marcus Miller) - 4:51
3. "Just Go" - 3:00
4. "Love T.K.O." (Cecil Womack, Linda Womack, Gip Noble) - 4:36
5. "Fade Into Light" - 4:36
6. "Harbor Lights" - 6:49
7. "Lost It" - 5:11
8. "Time" - 4:16
9. "Sierra" - 5:21
10. "We're All Alone" - 4:03
11. "Simone" (Boz Scaggs, David Foster) - 7:00
12. "I'll Be the One" - 3:50

== Personnel ==
CD credits

- Boz Scaggs – lead vocals, guitars (1–4, 8, 12), keyboard programming (3), drum programming (3), keyboards (9), lead guitar (9), backing vocals (12)
- David Paich – keyboards (1), additional arrangements (1), organ (4), Wurlitzer electric piano (4)
- Greg Phillinganes – electric piano (1), keyboards (4), backing vocals (4)
- Randy Kerber – keyboards (2), acoustic piano (5, 6, 10), string arrangements and conductor (5)
- Aaron Zigman – keyboards (2), synth string arrangements (2)
- Michael Rodriguez – keyboard programming (3), drum programming (3), programming (12)
- Michael Omartian – keyboards (7)
- William "Smitty" Smith – organ (7)
- Ricky Fataar – keyboards (8, 9, 12), guitars (8, 9, 12), drums (8, 9, 12), percussion (8, 9, 12)
- Kevin Bents – acoustic piano (9)
- Booker T. Jones – Hammond B3 organ (9)
- Jai Winding – acoustic piano (11)
- Dean Parks – acoustic guitar (1, 4), electric guitar (4)
- Fred Tackett – guitars (2, 6, 10, 11), acoustic guitar (9)
- Ray Parker Jr. – electric guitar (4), backing vocals (4)
- Robben Ford – guitars (7)
- Dave Carpenter – bass guitar (1, 2, 6, 10, 11)
- Nathan East – bass guitar (1, 4, 8, 9)
- Neil Stubenhaus – bass guitar (5)
- Roscoe Beck – bass guitar (7)
- James "Hutch" Hutchinson – bass guitar (8)
- Jim Keltner – drums (7)
- Curt Bisquera – percussion (1, 6, 11), drums (2, 4, 5)
- Lenny Castro – percussion (1, 4)
- Tom Scott – tenor saxophone (1)
- Norbet Stachel – saxophone (11)
- Kathy Merrick – backing vocals (1, 6, 11)
- Lisa Fraizer – backing vocals (1, 2, 6, 11)

DVD credits

- Boz Scaggs – lead vocals, guitars
- Jim Cox – keyboards
- Drew Zing – guitars
- Matt Bissonette – bass
- John Ferraro – drums
- Charles McNeal – saxophones, flute
- Rich Armstrong – trumpets
- Barbara Wilson – backing vocals
- Conesha Monét Owens – backing vocals

== Production ==
CD credits

- Producers – Boz Scaggs; David Paich (Tracks 1 & 4); Ricky Fataar (Tracks 7, 8 & 12).
- Recorded by Michael Rodriguez
- Mixing – Steve MacMillan (Tracks 1–11); Michael Rodriguez (Track 12).
- Mastered by Bernie Grundman at Bernie Grundman Mastering (Hollywood, California).

DVD credits

- Director – Lawrence Jordan
- Producers – Daniel E. Catullo, Jack Gulick and David Paich.
- Executive Producers – Daniel E. Catullo, Jack Gulick and Craig Fruin.
- Recorded by Michael Rodriguez
- Mixed by Steve MacMillan
- Editors – Guy Harding and Chris Lovett
- Filmed at The Great American Music Hall (San Francisco, CA).

Other credits

- Art Direction and Design – Lex Peltier and Rex Sforza
- Photography – Walter Chin
