= Just Like That... =

Studio album by Bonnie Raitt
- Released: April 22, 2022
- Studios: Studio D (Sausalito, California); Henson (Hollywood, California); Reid Brody (Chicago, Illinois)
- Genres: Blues rock; folk rock
- Length: 46:13
- Label: Redwing
- Producer: Bonnie Raitt

Bonnie Raitt chronology
Dig In Deep (2016)	Just Like That... (2022)

Singles from Just Like That...
- 1. "Made Up Mind" Released: February 25, 2022; 2. "Something's Got a Hold of My Heart" Released: March 25, 2022; 3. "Livin' for the Ones" Released: April 19, 2022

Just Like That... is the eighteenth studio album by American singer, songwriter, and guitarist Bonnie Raitt. Released on April 22, 2022, it is her first studio album since 2016's Dig In Deep. The album was nominated for a Grammy award for Best Americana Album in 2023. Its title track won the Grammy Award for Song of the Year and Best American Roots Song and lead single "Made Up Mind" won Best Americana Performance.

== Background and release ==
Recorded and mixed by Ryan Freeland, Just Like That... is her third for her own Redwing Records. It is her 11th recording with her longtime drummer Ricky Fataar and 12th with longtime bassist James "Hutch" Hutchinson. "Made Up Mind" was released as a single on February 25, 2022, reaching number 17 on the US Adult album alternative (AAA) chart. "Made Up Mind" was followed by the singles "Something's Got a Hold of My Heart" and "Livin' for the Ones" prior to the album's release. Upon its release on April 22, 2022, Just Like That... reached number 44 on the Billboard 200.

== Critical reception ==
Professional ratings
Aggregate scores
Source	Rating
Metacritic	76/100
Review scores
Source	Rating
AllMusic	4/5 stars
American Songwriter	3.5/5 stars
Classic Rock	4/5 stars
Pitchfork	7.0/10
Rolling Stone	3.5/5 stars
Uncut	4/5 stars
New York Times	(favourable)

On AllMusic, Stephen Thomas Erlewine wrote: "The blend of rock, blues, soul, reggae, folk, and pop that fuels Just Like That – her 18th album and first since 2016's Dig In Deep – is deeply familiar, evoking memories of her classic 1970s LPs while sounding of a piece with such relaxed latter-day records as Slipstream... It all adds up to an album that slowly works its way into the subconscious, sounding deeper and richer with each successive play." Music critic Robert Christgau ranked Just Like That... at number 39 on his "Dean's List" of the best albums of 2022.

The album was nominated for a Grammy award for Best Americana Album in 2023.

== Track listing ==
Just Like That... track listing
No.	Title	Writer(s)	Length
1.	"Made Up Mind"	David Landreth, Joseph Sidney Landreth, Jonathan Singleton	3:40
2.	"Something's Got a Hold of My Heart"	Al Anderson	4:51
3.	"Livin' for the Ones"	Bonnie Raitt, George Marinelli	3:05
4.	"Just Like That"	Raitt	5:05
5.	"When We Say Goodnight"	Jonah S. Smith	5:01
6.	"Waitin' for You to Blow"	Raitt	5:27
7.	"Blame It on Me"	Andrew Matheson, John Capek	5:48
8.	"Love So Strong"	Frederick "Toots" Hibbert	4:31
9.	"Here Comes Love"	Antoni Lech Wierzynski	4:15
10.	"Down the Hall"	Raitt	4:30
Total length:			46:13

== Personnel ==
- Bonnie Raitt – vocals, electric slide guitar (1–3, 5, 7, 8), acoustic guitar (4, 10), arrangements (8, 9), electric guitar (9)
- Glenn Patscha – Rhodes electric piano (1, 2, 5, 6), Hammond B3 organ (1, 4–8, 10), backing vocals (1–3, 5, 8), acoustic piano (3, 8), electric piano (3), clavinet (3, 8), Wurlitzer electric piano (8)
- Jon Cleary – electric piano (9), percussion (9), backing vocals (9)
- Mike Finnigan – Hammond B3 organ (9), backing vocals (9)
- Kenny Greenberg – electric guitar (1–8), acoustic guitar (8)
- George Marinelli – electric guitar (3, 9), backing vocals (3), percussion (9)
- James "Hutch" Hutchinson – bass guitar (1–9)
- Ricky Fataar – drums (1–9), percussion (1–9), backing vocals (1–3, 8, 9)

=== Production ===
- Bonnie Raitt – producer, styling, staging, liner notes
- Ryan Freeland – recording, mixing
- Derek Williams – second engineer (1–8, 10)
- Pablo Hernandez – second engineer (9)
- Josh Simmons – third engineer (9)
- Jeff Jaffe – vocal session overdubs
- Matt Reagen – assistant engineer (1–8, 10), overdub assistant
- Kim Rosen – mastering at Knack Mastering (Ringwood, New Jersey)
- Ray Fernandez – label coordinator
- Brian Porizek – art direction, design
- Molly Bosted – photo whisperer
- Ken Friedman – photography
- Tim Konrad – performance photography
- Ed Rode – performance photography
- Kathy Kane – management
- Annie Heller-Gutwillig – management

=== Crew ===
- Derek Williams – pre/post recording, production manager
- McKenzee Morley – reshersal monitor engineer
- Ross Lahey – technician (keyboards, guitars, bass)

== Charts ==
Chart performance
Chart (2022)	Peak position
Australian Jazz and Blues Albums (ARIA)	4
Belgian Albums (Ultratop Flanders)	194
German Albums (Offizielle Top 100)	54
Scottish Albums (Official Charts)	16
Swiss Albums (Schweizer Hitparade)	28
UK Independent Albums (Official Charts)	8
US Billboard 200	44
US Americana/Folk Albums (Billboard)	1
US Top Blues Albums (Billboard)	1
US Top Rock Albums (Billboard)	6
