= Longing in Their Hearts =

Studio album by Bonnie Raitt
- Released: March 22, 1994
- Studios: Ocean Way Recording (Hollywood, California); Chomsky Ranch, The Convent and Record Plant (Los Angeles, California); Power Station (New York City, New York)
- Genres: Blues rock, country pop
- Length: 51:11
- Label: Capitol
- Producers: Bonnie Raitt; Don Was

Bonnie Raitt chronology
Luck of the Draw (1991)	Longing in Their Hearts (1994)	Road Tested (1995)

Singles from Longing in Their Hearts
- 1. "Love Sneakin' Up On You" Released: 1994

Professional ratings
Review scores
Source	Rating
AllMusic	4.5/5 stars
Robert Christgau	(neither)
Entertainment Weekly	B
Music Week	3/5 stars
Orlando Sentinel	3/5 stars
Rolling Stone	4/5 stars

Longing in Their Hearts is the twelfth album by American singer-songwriter Bonnie Raitt, released in 1994. The album gave Raitt a mainstream hit with "Love Sneakin' Up On You," which reached #19 on the US Billboard singles chart, and "You", which remains to date her only UK Top 40 hit, peaking at No. 31.

== Track listing ==
1. "Love Sneakin' Up On You" (Tom Snow, Jimmy Scott) – 3:41
2. "Longing in Their Hearts" (Bonnie Raitt, Michael O'Keefe) – 4:48
3. "You" (John Shanks, Bob Thiele Jr., Tonio K.) – 4:27
4. "Cool, Clear Water" (Raitt) – 5:27
5. "Circle Dance" (Raitt) – 4:11
6. "I Sho Do" (Teenie Hodges, Billy Always) – 3:38
7. "Dimming of the Day" (Richard Thompson) – 3:39
8. "Feeling of Falling" (Raitt) – 6:17
9. "Steal Your Heart Away" (Paul Brady) – 5:44
10. "Storm Warning" (Terry Britten, Lea Maalfrid) – 4:31
11. "Hell to Pay" (Raitt) – 4:03
12. "Shadow of Doubt" (Gary Nicholson) – 4:26

== Personnel ==
- Bonnie Raitt – vocals, backing vocals (1, 3, 6), slide guitar (1, 6, 10, 11), acoustic guitar (2, 3), keyboards (4), electric piano (5), string and woodwind arrangements (5), horn arrangements (6), organ (8), slide acoustic guitar (12), foot sounds (12), arrangements (12)
- Scott Thurston – keyboards (1, 6, 11), keyboard programming (5)
- Bob Thiele, Jr. – synth accordion (3), synth pad (3), arrangements (3)
- Benmont Tench – Hammond C3 organ (5, 7, 9), keyboards (9, 10)
- Mitchell Froom – harmonium (7)
- George Marinelli – electric guitar (1–3), mandolin (2, 4), guitars (4), lead guitar (9)
- Mark Goldenberg – electric guitar (3), oud (3), "first" acoustic guitar (7)
- Randy Jacobs – lead guitar (6), rhythm guitar (6, 9), electric guitar (11)
- Richard Thompson – "second" acoustic guitar (7)
- Stephen Bruton – electric guitar (8)
- James "Hutch" Hutchinson – bass guitar (1–4, 6, 8–11)
- Don Was – acoustic bass (5)
- Buell Neidlinger – acoustic bass (7)
- Ricky Fataar – drums (1, 2, 4, 6, 8–11)
- Paulinho da Costa – percussion (1–6, 8–11)
- Debra Dobkin – Celtic bass drum (4)
- Jon Clarke – alto flute (5), bass flute (5), English horn (5)
- David Campbell – string and woodwind arrangements (5)
- Larry Corbett – cello (5)
- Suzie Katayama – cello (5)
- Daniel Smith – cello (5)
- Scott Haupert – viola (5)
- Cynthia Morrow – viola (5)
- Marty Grebb – baritone saxophone (6), horn arrangements (6)
- The Memphis Horns
  - Andrew Love – tenor saxophone (6), horn arrangements (6)
  - Wayne Jackson – trombone (6), trumpet (6), horn arrangements (6)
- Charlie Musselwhite – harmonica (12)
- Sweet Pea Atkinson – backing vocals (1, 4, 6, 9, 10)
- Sir Harry Bowens – backing vocals (1, 3, 4, 6, 9, 10)
- David Lasley – backing vocals (1, 3, 4, 9, 10)
- Arnold McCuller – backing vocals (1, 3, 4, 6, 9, 10)
- Levon Helm – harmony vocals (2)
- Paul Brady – harmony vocals (4, 7), penny whistle (4), acoustic guitar (9)
- David Crosby – harmony vocals (5)

== Production ==
- Producers – Bonnie Raitt and Don Was
- Engineer and Mixing – Ed Cherney
- Assistant Engineer – Dan Bosworth
- Additional Engineers – Chris Albert, Dan Bosworth, Brad Cook and James Saez.
- Mix Assistant – Michael Reiter
- Mastered by Doug Sax at The Mastering Lab (Hollywood, CA).
- Production Coordination – Marsha Burns, assisted by Carrie McConkey.
- Art Direction – Jeffrey Fey and Tommy Steele
- Design – Jeffrey Fey
- Photography – John Casado
- Centerspread Painting – Clayton Campbell
- Lettering Design and Logo – Tim Girvin Design, Inc.
- Management – Jeffrey Hersh, Ron Stone and Jane Oppenheimer.

== Other information ==
Stevie Nicks covered "Circle Dance" on her first live album, The Soundstage Sessions, which was released on March 31, 2009.

== Charts ==
=== Weekly charts ===
Chart (1994)	Peak position
Australian Albums (ARIA)	27
Canada Top Albums/CDs (RPM)	13
Dutch Albums (Album Top 100)	34
German Albums (Offizielle Top 100)	70
New Zealand Albums (RMNZ)	7
Swedish Albums (Sverigetopplistan)	36
Swiss Albums (Schweizer Hitparade)	40
UK Albums (Official Charts)	26
US Billboard 200	1

=== Year-end charts ===
Chart (1994)	Position
Canada Top Albums/CDs (RPM)	75
US Billboard 200	55

== Certifications ==
Region	Certification	Certified units/sales
Canada (Music Canada)	Platinum	100,000^{^}
United States (RIAA)	2× Platinum	2,000,000^{^}
^{^} Shipments figures based on certification alone.

== Awards ==
Grammy Awards

Year	Winner	Category
1994	Longing in Their Hearts	Best Engineered Album, Non-Classical
1994	Longing in Their Hearts	Best Pop Vocal Album
