= Slipstream (Bonnie Raitt album) =

Studio album by Bonnie Raitt
- Released: April 10, 2012
- Studios: Ocean Way (Hollywood, California); Garfield House (Pasadena, California)
- Length: 57:49
- Label: Redwing
- Producers: Bonnie Raitt; Joe Henry

Bonnie Raitt chronology
| Souls Alike (2005) | Slipstream (2012) | Dig In Deep (2016) |

Slipstream is the sixteenth studio album by Bonnie Raitt, released on April 10, 2012 on Redwing Records. The album reached number 6 on the US Billboard 200 and topped the US Top Blues Albums, Top Rock Albums, and Top Independent Albums charts. Slipstream received positive reviews from critics and won the Grammy Award for Best Americana Album at the 2013 Grammy Awards.

== Release ==
Two singles were released from Slipstream: a cover of Gerry Rafferty's "Right Down the Line", and "Used to Rule the World", both of which charted on the US Triple A chart. The album's accompanying concert tour, the Slipstream Tour, was the 82nd best-selling American tour of 2012, earning 11.3 million dollars and selling 201,313 tickets.

== Critical reception ==
Professional ratings
Aggregate scores
| Source | Rating |
|---|---|
| Metacritic | 74/100 |
Review scores
| Source | Rating |
| AllMusic | 4/5 stars |
| American Songwriter | 4/5 stars |
| Blurt | 7/10 stars |
| The Boston Globe | (favourable) |
| Chicago Tribune | 3/4 stars |
| Daily Express | 4/5 stars |
| Entertainment Weekly | A− |
| Paste | (8.5/10) |
| Robert Christgau | (2-star Honorable Mention) |
| Rolling Stone | 4/5 stars |

Slipstream received generally positive reviews from music critics. At Metacritic, which assigns a normalized rating out of 100 to reviews from mainstream critics, the album received an average score of 74 based on 13 reviews, which indicates "generally favourable reviews".

Ken Tucker of Entertainment Weekly called Slipstream a "superb...mix of rock, blues, folk, and funk" and "the singer's best album since 1975's underrated Home Plate". Allen Morrison of American Songwriter similarly wrote, "Slipstream is Bonnie Raitt’s best album in years and one of the best of her 40-year career." The Columbus Dispatch noted "Slipstream does represent a split decision, between the quiet anguish of the Joe Henry-produced tracks and the rockers written by Al Anderson and other bluesy compatriots. But this combination of musical approaches doesn't seem frenzied. In Raitt's hands, it's all chicken soup for the middle-aged-rocker soul."

Holly Gleason of Paste wrote, "It's been seven years since Bonnie Raitt released Souls Alike, and a lot of life has happened. Losing her parents, brother and a best friend has left the veteran blues/soul rocker with plenty to think about—and that pensiveness colors Slipstream with knowing acceptance, nuanced takes on loss and a grace that finds splendor in the raw places." Thom Jurek of AllMusic wrote, "There are a few lesser moments, but they don't distract; Slipstream reveals Raitt at another creative peak." Simon Gage of the Daily Express declared, "this eclectic album, her first in seven years..touches on blues, reggae, old-school soul and rock....The voice is as loaded with emotion as ever and the songs of the highest calibre with work by Bob Dylan and Loudon Wainwright III among them."

The album was placed at No. 22 on Rolling Stone's list of the 50 best albums of 2012, with the magazine remarking: "As young stars like Adele and Katy Perry cover her songs, Raitt continues what she’s been doing, more or less, for 40-plus years: Pick a bunch of smart, tender tunes by great writers (Slipstream includes a pair by Bob Dylan), add one or two of her own, and sing them in a soulful ache, dotted by her casual slideguitar punctuations.."

Slipstream won the Grammy Award for Best Americana Album at the 2013 Grammy Awards.

== Commercial performance ==
Debuting at No. 6 on the Billboard 200, Slipstream became Raitt's highest-charting album in 18 years. It also debuted at No. 1 on both the Rock Albums and Blues Albums charts. selling around 63,000 copies. The album has sold 334,000 albums in the US as of January 2016.

Slipstream became the 106th best-selling album and 9th best-selling independent album in the United States in 2012. Slipstream was also the best-selling Blues album of 2012, and Bonnie Raitt was the best-selling Blues artist of 2012.

== Track listing ==
| No. | Title | Writer(s) | Length |
|---|---|---|---|
| 1. | "Used to Rule the World" | Randall Bramblett | 4:17 |
| 2. | "Right Down the Line" | Gerry Rafferty | 5:29 |
| 3. | "Million Miles" | Bob Dylan | 6:26 |
| 4. | "You Can't Fail Me Now" | Loudon Wainwright III, Joseph Lee Henry | 4:18 |
| 5. | "Down to You" | George Marinelli, lyrics Bonnie Raitt, Bramblett | 3:59 |
| 6. | "Take My Love with You" | Gordon Kennedy, Wayne Kirkpatrick, Kelly Price | 4:24 |
| 7. | "Not Cause I Wanted To" | Al Anderson, Bonnie Bishop | 3:37 |
| 8. | "Ain't Gonna Let You Go" | Anderson, Bonnie Bramlett | 5:59 |
| 9. | "Marriage Made in Hollywood" | Paul Brady, Michael O'Keefe | 4:55 |
| 10. | "Split Decision" | Anderson, Gary Nicholson | 4:35 |
| 11. | "Standing in the Doorway" | Dylan | 5:24 |
| 12. | "God Only Knows" | Joseph Lee Henry | 4:26 |
| Total length: | | | 57:49 |

== Credits and personnel ==
The credits were adapted from the liner notes.

- Bonnie Raitt – vocals, electric slide guitar (1–3, 5, 8, 10, 11), arrangements (2), acoustic guitar (3), tambourine (10)
- Mike Finnigan – Hammond B3 organ (1, 2, 6–10), backing vocals (1), clavinet (2), acoustic piano (5), organ (5), Wurlitzer electric piano (6, 8, 9)
- Patrick Warren – acoustic piano (3, 11, 12), Wurlitzer electric piano (4), pump organ (7), keyboards (11, 12)
- Johnny Lee Schell – electric guitar (1)
- George Marinelli – electric guitar (1, 2, 5–7, 9), harmony vocals (2, 5), acoustic guitar (6, 9), backing vocals (6), shakers (8), mandolin (9)
- Bill Frisell – electric guitar (3, 4, 11)
- Greg Leisz – acoustic guitar (3, 4), pedal steel guitar (11)
- Al Anderson – acoustic guitar (6–8), lead guitar solo (7), electric guitar (10), harmony vocals (10)
- James "Hutch" Hutchinson – bass guitar (1, 2, 5, 6, 8–10), upright bass (7)
- David Piltch – upright bass (3, 4, 11)
- Ricky Fataar – drums (1, 2, 5, 6, 8–10), timbales (2), tambourine (9, 10)
- Jay Bellerose – drums (3, 4, 11)
- Luis Conte – percussion (1, 2, 6)
- Gang – handclaps (5)
- Maia Sharp – backing vocals (2, 6, 9), harmony vocals (7)
- Jeff Young – backing vocals (6)
- Paul Brady – harmony vocals (9)

=== Production ===
- Producers – Bonnie Raitt (Tracks 1, 2 & 5–10); Joe Henry (Tracks 3, 4, 11 & 12).
- Recorded and Mixed by Ryan Freeland
- Second Engineer – Wesley Seidman
- Various overdubs on Tracks 6, 7, 9, 10 & 12 recorded by Scott Baggett.
- Mixed at Stampede Origin Studio (Culver City, CA).
- Mastered by Bob Ludwig at Gateway Mastering (Portland, ME).
- Project Coordinator – Kathy Kane
- Art Direction and Design – Norman Miller and DesignartLA.com.
- Photography – Matt Mindlin
- Background Photos – Norman Miller
- Assistant Photography – Omar Gaieck and Chris Soule
- Management – Kathy Kane, assisted by Annie Heller-Gutwillig, Chloe Monahan and Mary Skerritt.
- Hair – Gunn Espegard
- Make-up – Kate Lindsay

== Charts ==
=== Weekly charts ===
| Chart (2012) | Peak position |
|---|---|
| Belgian Albums (Ultratop Flanders) | 51 |
| Canadian Albums (Billboard) | 14 |
| Dutch Albums (Album Top 100) | 24 |
| New Zealand Albums (RMNZ) | 34 |
| Swedish Albums (Sverigetopplistan) | 49 |
| UK Albums (Official Charts) | 64 |
| US Billboard 200 | 6 |
| US Top Blues Albums (Billboard) | 1 |
| US Independent Albums (Billboard) | 1 |
| US Top Rock Albums (Billboard) | 1 |
| US Indie Store Album Sales (Billboard) | 1 |

=== Year-end charts ===
| Chart (2012) | Position |
|---|---|
| US Billboard 200 | 106 |
| US Top Blues Albums (Billboard) | 1 |
| US Top Rock Albums (Billboard) | 30 |

| Chart (2013) | Position |
|---|---|
| US Top Blues Albums (Billboard) | 5 |
