= Bonnie Raitt =

American singer-songwriter (born 1949)

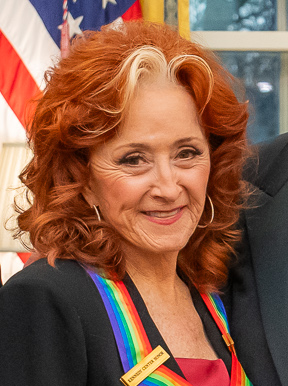
- Raitt in 2024

Background information
- Born: Bonnie Lynn Raitt; November 8, 1949 (age 76); Burbank, California, U.S.
- Genres: Rock; blues; country; folk
- Occupations: Singer; musician; songwriter
- Instruments: Vocals; guitar
- Years active: 1971–present
- Labels: Warner Bros.; Capitol; Redwing; Proper
- Website: bonnieraitt.com

Signature
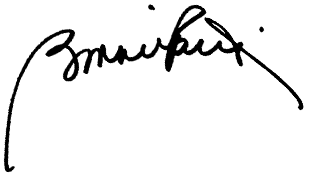

Bonnie Lynn Raitt (/reɪt/; born November 8, 1949) is an American singer and songwriter. In 1971, Raitt released her self-titled debut album. Following this, she released a series of critically acclaimed roots-influenced albums that incorporated elements of rock, blues, country, and folk. She was also a frequent session player and collaborator with other artists, including Warren Zevon, Little Feat, Jackson Browne, the Pointer Sisters, John Prine, and Leon Russell.

In 1989, after several years of limited commercial success, she had a major hit with her tenth studio album, Nick of Time, which included the song "Nick of Time". The album reached number one on the Billboard 200 chart, and won the Grammy Award for Album of the Year. It has since been selected by the Library of Congress for preservation in the United States National Recording Registry. Her following two albums, Luck of the Draw (1991) and Longing in Their Hearts (1994), were multimillion sellers, generating several hit singles, including "Something to Talk About", "Love Sneakin' Up On You", and the ballad "I Can't Make You Love Me" (with Bruce Hornsby on piano). Her 2022 single "Just Like That" won the Grammy Award for Song of the Year.

As of 2025, Raitt has received 13 competitive Grammy Awards, from 31 nominations, as well as a Grammy Lifetime Achievement Award. She ranked No. 50 on Rolling Stone's list of the "100 Greatest Singers of All Time" and ranked No. 89 on the magazine's list of the "100 Greatest Guitarists of All Time." Australian country music artist Graeme Connors has said "Bonnie Raitt does something with a lyric no one else can do; she bends it and twists it right into your heart."

In 2000, Raitt was inducted into the Rock and Roll Hall of Fame. She has received the Icon Award from the Billboard Women in Music Awards and the MusiCares Person of the Year Award from The Recording Academy. In 2024, she was a recipient of the Kennedy Center Honor.

== Early life ==
Bonnie Lynn Raitt was born on November 8, 1949, in Burbank, California. Her mother, Marge Goddard (née Haydock), was a pianist, and her father, John Raitt, was a professional actor and singer in musicals, including the original Broadway lead roles in Carousel and The Pajama Game. Raitt is of Scottish ancestry, a descendant of the Rait Clan that built Rait Castle near Nairn in the 13th Century. As a child, Raitt would often play with her two brothers, Steve and David, and was a self-described tomboy. John Raitt's job as a theatre actor meant that Bonnie did not interact with him as much as she would have liked. She came to resent her mother, who became the main authority figure in the family whenever John was away.

Raitt's musically inclined parents had a strong influence on her life. From a young age, she and her brothers were encouraged to pursue music. Initially, Bonnie played the piano, but she felt intimidated by her mother's abilities. Instead, she began playing a Stella guitar, which she received as a Christmas gift in 1957 at the age of eight. Raitt did not take lessons, and instead fashioned her style after musicians from the American folk music revival of the 1950s. She was also influenced by the beatnik movement of that period, stating "It represented my whole belief [...] I'd grow my hair real long so I looked like a beatnik."

From ages eight through fifteen, Raitt and her brothers attended an annual summer camp in the Adirondack Mountains called Camp Regis. It was there that Raitt learned of her musical talents, when camp counselors would ask her to play in front of the campers. Learning how to play songs then became a hobby for Raitt. As a teenager, Raitt was self-conscious about her weight and her freckles, and saw music as an escape from reality. "That was my saving grace. I just sat in my room and played my guitar," said Raitt. At age 14, she listened to the album Blues at Newport 63, which instilled an interest in blues music and the slide guitar technique.

In 1967, Raitt enrolled at Radcliffe College in Massachusetts, majoring in social relations and African studies. While at Radcliffe, she joined a musical group called the Revolutionary Music Collective, which played for striking students from neighboring Harvard University during the national anti-Vietnam War student strike of 1970. Despite her abilities, Raitt did not consider music to be anything more than a hobby. Her plan after graduation was to travel to Tanzania, and work to improve the government under president Julius Nyerere. During her first year of college, Raitt befriended blues promoter Dick Waterman, and in her second year, left school for a semester to travel to Philadelphia with Waterman and other local musicians. Raitt said it was an "opportunity that changed everything."

== Career ==
=== 1970–1976 ===
In the summer of 1970, she played with her brother David on stand-up bass with Mississippi Fred McDowell at the Philadelphia Folk Festival as well as opening for John Hammond at the Gaslight Cafe in New York. She was seen by a reporter from Newsweek, who began to spread the word about her performance. Scouts from major record companies were soon attending her shows to watch her play. She eventually accepted an offer from Warner Bros., who soon released her debut album, Bonnie Raitt, in 1971. The album was warmly received by the music press, with many writers praising her skills as an interpreter and as a bottleneck guitarist; at the time, few women in popular music had strong reputations as guitarists.

While admired by those who saw her perform and respected by her peers, Raitt gained little public acclaim for her work. Her critical stature continued to grow, but record sales remained modest. Her second album, Give It Up, was released in 1972 to positive reviews. One journalist described the album as "an excellent set" and "established the artist as an inventive and sympathetic interpreter". However, it did not change her commercial fortunes. 1973's Takin' My Time was also met with critical acclaim, but these notices were not matched by the sales.

Raitt began to receive greater press coverage, including a 1975 cover story for Rolling Stone, but with 1974's Streetlights, reviews for her work were becoming increasingly mixed. By this point, Raitt was already experimenting with different producers and different styles, and she began to adopt a more mainstream sound that continued through 1975's Home Plate. In 1976, Raitt made an appearance on Warren Zevon's eponymous album.

She was influenced by the playing style of Lowell George, of the band Little Feat, particularly his use of an MXR Dyna Comp pre-amp compressor with a slide guitar. B.B. King once called Raitt the "best damn slide player working today".

=== 1977–1988 ===
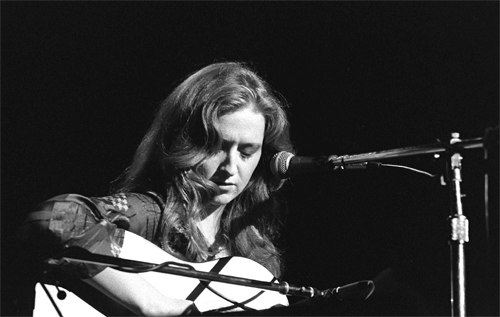
Raitt performing at the Berkeley Community Theater, 1976–1977

1977's Sweet Forgiveness album gave Raitt her first commercial breakthrough, when it yielded a hit single in her remake of "Runaway". Recast as a heavy rhythm and blues recording based on a rhythmic groove inspired by Al Green, Raitt's version of "Runaway" was disparaged by many critics. However, the song's commercial success prompted a bidding war for Raitt between Warner Bros. and Columbia Records. "There was this big Columbia–Warner war going on at the time", recalled Raitt in a 1990 interview. "James Taylor had just left Warner Bros. and made a big album for Columbia... And then, Warner signed Paul Simon away from Columbia, and they didn't want me to have a hit record for Columbia – no matter what! So, I renegotiated my contract, and they basically matched Columbia's offer. Frankly the deal was a really big deal."

Warner Brothers held higher expectations for her next album, The Glow, in 1979, but it was released to poor reviews as well as modest sales. Raitt had one commercial success in 1979 when she helped organize the five concerts of Musicians United for Safe Energy (MUSE) at Madison Square Garden in New York City. Those shows spawned the three-record gold album No Nukes, as well as a Warner Brothers feature film No Nukes, and featured co-founders Jackson Browne, Graham Nash, John Hall, and Raitt as well as Bruce Springsteen, Tom Petty and the Heartbreakers, the Doobie Brothers, Carly Simon, James Taylor, Gil Scott-Heron, and others.

In 1980, she appeared as herself in the Paramount film Urban Cowboy where she sang "Don't It Make You Wanna Dance".

For her next record, 1982's Green Light, Raitt made a conscious attempt to revisit the sound of her earlier records. However, to her surprise, many of her peers and the media compared her new sound to the burgeoning new wave movement. The album received her strongest reviews in years, but her sales did not improve and this had a severe impact on her relationship with Warner Brothers.

==== Tongue and Groove and release from Warner Brothers ====
In 1983, Raitt was finishing work on her follow-up album, Tongue and Groove. The day after mastering was completed on Tongue & Groove, the record company dropped Raitt from its roster, not being happy with her commercial performance up to that point. The album was shelved and not released, and Raitt was left without a record contract. At this time, Raitt was also struggling with alcohol and drug abuse problems.

Despite her personal and professional problems, Raitt continued to tour and participate in political activism. In 1985, she sang and appeared in the video of "Sun City", the anti-apartheid song written and produced by guitarist Steven Van Zandt. Along with her participation in Farm Aid and Amnesty International concerts, Raitt traveled to Moscow, Russia in 1987 to participate in the first joint Soviet/American Peace Concert, later shown on the Showtime cable network. Also in 1987, Raitt organized a benefit in Los Angeles for Countdown '87 to Stop Contra Aid. The benefit featured herself, along with Don Henley, Herbie Hancock, and others.

Two years after Warner Brothers Records dropped Raitt from their label, they notified her of their plans to release the Tongue and Groove album. "I said it wasn't really fair," recalled Raitt. "I think at this point they felt kind of bad. I mean, I was out there touring on my savings to keep my name up, and my ability to draw was less and less. So they agreed to let me go in and recut half of it, and that's when it came out as Nine Lives." That album, released in 1986 to critical and commercial disappointment, was Raitt's last new recording for Warner Brothers.

In late 1987, Raitt joined singers k.d. lang and Jennifer Warnes as background vocalists for Roy Orbison's television special, Roy Orbison and Friends, A Black and White Night. Following this highly acclaimed broadcast, Raitt began working on new material. By then, she was clean and sober, having resolved her problems with substance abuse. She later credited Stevie Ray Vaughan for his help in a Minnesota State Fair concert the night after Vaughan's 1990 death. During this time, Raitt considered signing with the Prince-owned Paisley Park Records, but they could not come to an agreement and negotiations fell through. Instead, she began recording a bluesy mix of pop and rock songs under the production guidance of Don Was at Capitol Records.

Raitt had met Was through Hal Willner, who was putting together Stay Awake, a tribute album to Disney music for A&M. Was and Willner both wanted Raitt to sing lead on an adult-contemporary arrangement created by Was for "Baby Mine", the lullaby from Dumbo. Raitt was very pleased with the sessions, and she asked Was to produce her next album.

=== 1989–1999: Commercial breakthrough ===
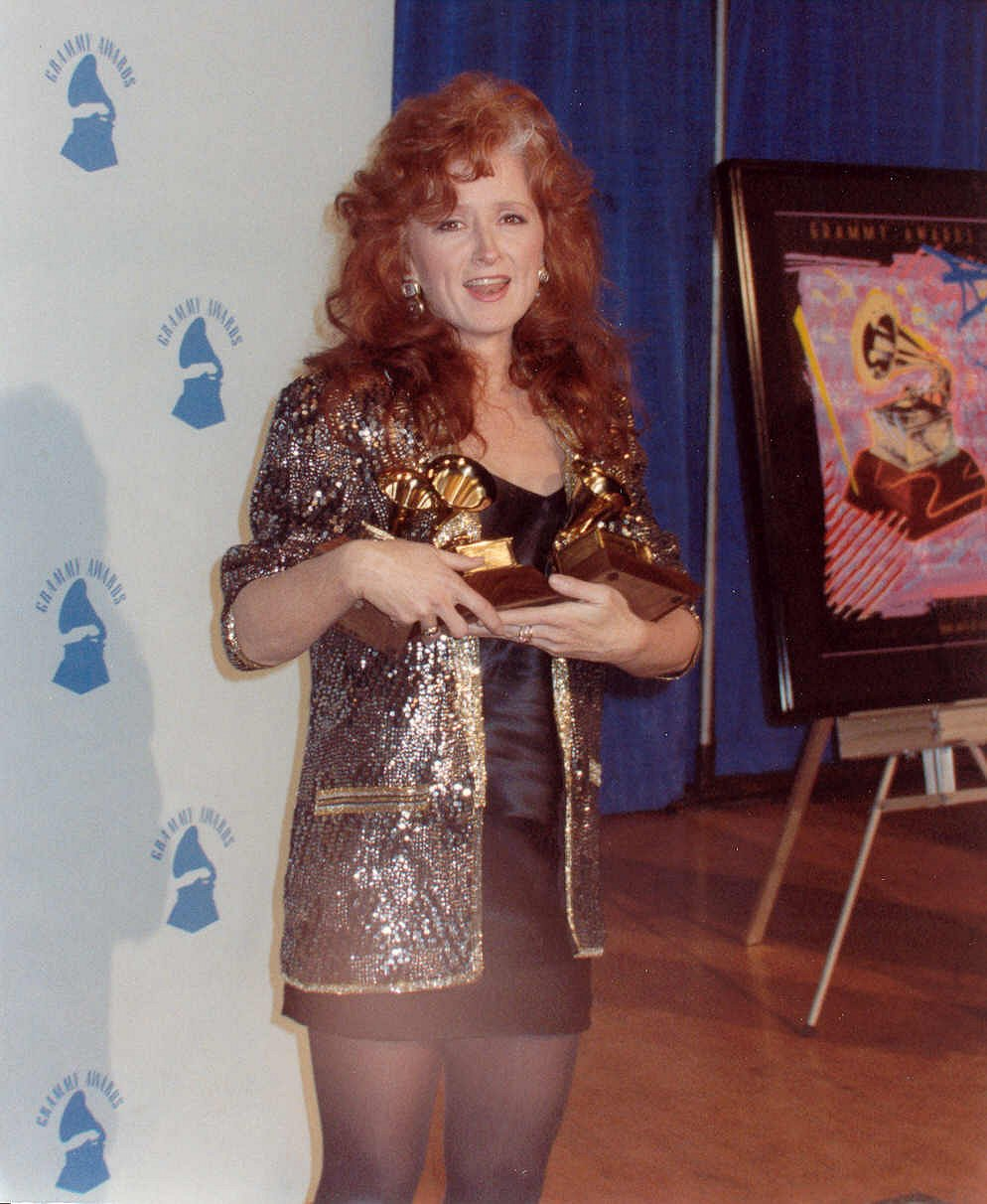
Raitt at the 1990 Grammy Awards

After working with Was on the Stay Awake album, Raitt's management, Gold Mountain, approached numerous labels about a new record deal and found interest from Capitol Records. Raitt was signed to Capitol by A&R executive Tim Devine. With her first Capitol Records release, and after nearly twenty years in the business, Raitt achieved commercial success with Nick of Time, her tenth overall album of her career. Released in the spring of 1989, Nick of Time went to number one on the U.S. album chart following Raitt's Grammy sweep in early 1990. This album has also been voted number 230 in the Rolling Stone list of 500 Greatest Albums of All Time. Raitt later stated that her tenth try was "my first sober album."

At the same time, Raitt received a fourth Grammy Award for her duet "I'm in the Mood" with John Lee Hooker on his album The Healer. Nick of Time was also the first of many of her recordings to feature her longtime rhythm section of Ricky Fataar and James "Hutch" Hutchinson (although previously Fataar had played on her Green Light album and Hutchinson had worked on Nine Lives), both of whom continue to record and tour with her. Since its release in 1989, Nick of Time has currently sold over five million copies in the US alone.

Raitt followed up this success with three more Grammy Awards for her next album, 1991's Luck of the Draw, which sold seven million copies in the United States. Three years later, in 1994, she added two more Grammys with her album Longing in Their Hearts, her second number one album, that sold two million copies in the US. Raitt's collaboration with Don Was amicably came to an end with 1995's live release Road Tested. Released to solid reviews, it was certified gold in the US.

"Rock Steady" was a hit written by Bryan Adams and Gretchen Peters in 1995. The song was written as a duet with Bryan Adams and Bonnie Raitt for her Road Tested tour, which also became one of her albums. The original demo version of the song appears on Adams' 1996 single "Let's Make a Night to Remember".

For her next studio album, Raitt hired Mitchell Froom and Tchad Blake as her producers. "I loved working with Don Was but I wanted to give myself and my fans a stretch and do something different," Raitt stated. Her work with Froom and Blake was released on Fundamental in 1998.

=== 2000–2007 ===
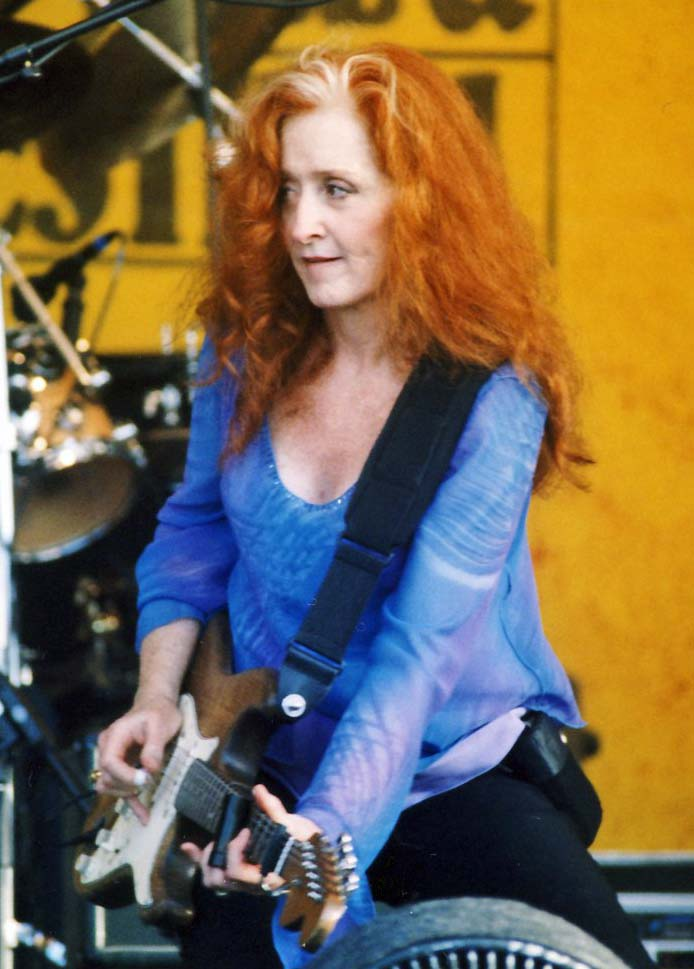
Raitt performing at the New Orleans Jazz & Heritage Festival, April 23, 2004

In March 2000, Raitt was inducted into the Rock and Roll Hall of Fame in Cleveland, Ohio. Silver Lining was released in 2002. In the US, it reached number 13 on the Billboard chart and was later certified Gold. It contains the singles "I Can't Help You Now", "Time of Our Lives", and the title track (a cover version of David Gray's original song). All three singles charted within the top 40 of the US Adult Contemporary chart.

On March 19, 2002, Raitt received a star on the Hollywood Walk of Fame for her contributions to the recording industry, located at 1750 N. Vine Street. In 2003 Capitol Records released the compilation album The Best of Bonnie Raitt. It contains songs from her prior Capitol albums from 1989 to 2002 including Nick of Time, Luck of the Draw, Longing in Their Hearts, Road Tested, Fundamental, and Silver Lining. Raitt was featured on the album True Love by Toots and the Maytals, which won the Grammy Award in 2004 for Best Reggae Album.

Souls Alike was released in September 2005. In the US, it reached the top 20 on the Billboard chart. It contains the singles "I Will Not Be Broken" and "I Don't Want Anything to Change", which both charted in the top 40 of the US Adult Contemporary chart. In 2006, she released the live DVD/CD Bonnie Raitt and Friends, which was filmed as part of the critically acclaimed VH1 Classic Decades Rock Live! concert series, featuring special guests Keb' Mo', Alison Krauss, Ben Harper, Jon Cleary, and Norah Jones. The DVD was released by Capitol Records on August 15. Bonnie Raitt and Friends, which was recorded live in Atlantic City, NJ on September 30, 2005, features never-before-seen performance and interview footage, including four duets not included in the VH1 Classic broadcast of the concert. The accompanying CD features 11 tracks, including the radio single "Two Lights in the Nighttime", featuring Ben Harper. In 2007, Raitt contributed to Goin' Home: A Tribute to Fats Domino. With Jon Cleary, she sang a medley of "I'm in Love Again" and "All by Myself" by Fats Domino.

Raitt is interviewed and appears in performance footage in the 2005 documentary film Make It Funky!, which presents a history of New Orleans music and its influence on rhythm and blues, rock and roll, funk and jazz. In the film, Raitt performs "What is Success" with Allen Toussaint and band, a song he wrote and that Raitt included on her 1974 album Streetlights.

=== 2008–present ===
Raitt appeared on the June 7, 2008 broadcast of Garrison Keillor's radio program A Prairie Home Companion. She performed two blues songs with Keb' Mo': "No Getting Over You" and "There Ain't Nothin' in Ramblin'". Raitt also sang "Dimming of the Day" with Richard Thompson. This show, along with another one with Raitt and her band in October 2006, is archived on the Prairie Home Companion website. Raitt appeared in the 2011 documentary Reggae Got Soul: The Story of Toots and the Maytals, which was featured on the BBC and described as "The untold story of one of the most influential artists ever to come out of Jamaica".

In February 2012, Raitt performed a duet with Alicia Keys at the 54th Annual Grammy Awards, honoring Etta James. In April 2012, Raitt released her first studio album since 2005, entitled Slipstream. It charted at Number 6 on the US Billboard 200 chart marking her first top ten album since 1994's Longing in Their Hearts. The album was described as "one of the best of her 40-year career" by American Songwriter magazine. In September 2012, Raitt was featured in a campaign called "30 Songs / 30 Days" to support Half the Sky: Turning Oppression into Opportunity for Women Worldwide, a multi-platform media project inspired by a project outlined in a book by Nicholas Kristof and Sheryl WuDunn. In 2013, she appeared on Foy Vance's album Joy of Nothing.

On May 30, 2015, Raitt, Leon Russell, and Ivan Neville gave a performance at The Canyon Club in Agoura Hills, California to raise money for Marty Grebb, who was battling cancer. Grebb had played on some of their albums.

In February 2016, Raitt released her seventeenth studio album Dig In Deep. The album charted at number 11 on the US Billboard 200 chart and received favorable reviews. The album features the single "Gypsy in Me" as well as a cover of the INXS song "Need You Tonight".

Raitt cancelled the first leg of her 2018 spring-summer touring schedule due to a recently discovered medical issue requiring surgical intervention. She reported that a "full recovery" is expected and that she planned to resume touring with already scheduled dates in June 2018.

In 2022, Raitt announced the title of her 21st studio album would be Just Like That.... The record was released on April 22, 2022, and coincided with the beginning of a nationwide tour that ran through November 2022. Preceding the album, Raitt released "Made Up Mind", a song originally written by Canadian roots duo The Bros. Landreth, as the lead single. The title track of the album won for Song of the Year at the 65th Annual Grammy Awards in February 2023. The song also won in the Best American Roots Song category.

In 2025, Raitt appeared in the feature documentary Lilith Fair: Building a Mystery – The Untold Story, which reflects on the legacy of the all-female music festival.

== Artistry ==
Raitt possesses a contralto vocal range. Music journalist Robert Christgau described Raitt's voice as "not particularly beautiful" but "textured", capable of "shouting, crooning, carry[ing] a tune or fill[ing] a room". Christgau likened her vocal style to "a loving woman who has the touch, soft and hard at the right times in the right places". Journalist Will Hermes described Raitt's voice as warm and precise. Describing her as a "master interpreter of other writers' songs", Chris Hansen Orf of The Arizona Republic noted that Raitt is equally skilled at singing blues, folk, country, rock and pop music. Kevin McKeough of the Chicago Tribune observed that blues has "remained the bedrock of all of Raitt's musical excursions", with her voice alternating between "sigh to a call to a sustained cry". Discussing the ability of a singer to make use of her voice, singer Linda Ronstadt stated "Of my own peers, Bonnie Raitt has way more musicianship than I do." Singer and guitarist David Crosby has said that Raitt is his favorite singer of all time.

== Personal life ==
Raitt has taken sabbaticals, including after the deaths of her parents, brother, and best friend. She has said, "When I went through a lot of loss, I took a hiatus." Raitt and actor Michael O'Keefe were married on April 27, 1991. They announced their divorce on November 9, 1999, with a factor appearing to be that their careers caused considerable time apart.

=== Drug and alcohol use and recovery ===
Raitt was a user of alcohol and drugs, but began psychotherapy and joined Alcoholics Anonymous in the late 1980s. "I thought I had to live that partying lifestyle in order to be authentic," she said, "but in fact if you keep it up too long, all you're going to be is sloppy or dead." She has been sober since 1987. She has credited Stevie Ray Vaughan for breaking her substance abuse, saying that what gave her the courage to admit her alcohol problem and stop drinking was seeing that Vaughan was an even better musician when sober. She has also said that she stopped because she realized that the "late night life" was not working for her. In 1989, she said, "I really feel like some angels have been carrying me around. I just have more focus and more discipline, and consequently more self-respect."

== Activism ==
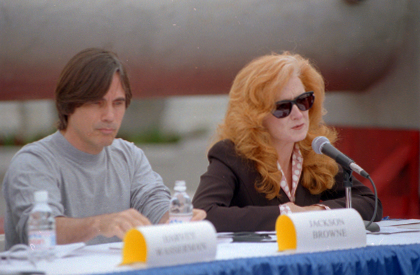
Raitt with musician Jackson Browne at a 1997 press conference opposing the proposed Yucca Mountain nuclear waste repository

Reflecting her anti-war sentiments, Raitt's 1972 album Give It Up featured a dedication "to the people of North Vietnam ..." printed on the back of the album. She was a founding member of Musicians United for Safe Energy in 1979, and a catalyst for the larger anti-nuclear power movement. She worked with anti-nuclear groups like the Abalone Alliance and the Southern California Alliance for Survival, performing at Survival Sunday benefit concerts at the Hollywood Bowl.

In 1994 at the urging of Dick Waterman, Raitt funded the replacement of a headstone for one of her mentors, blues guitarist Fred McDowell through the Mount Zion Memorial Fund. Raitt later financed memorial headstones in Mississippi for musicians Memphis Minnie, Sam Chatmon, and Tommy Johnson again with the Mount Zion Memorial Fund.

In 2002, Raitt signed on as an official supporter of Little Kids Rock, a nonprofit organization that provides free musical instruments and free lessons to children in public schools throughout the U.S. She has visited children in the program and sits on the organization's board of directors as an honorary member.

At the Stockholm Jazz Festival in July 2004, Raitt dedicated a performance of "Your Good Thing (Is About to End)", from her 1979 album The Glow, to sitting (and later re-elected) U.S. President George W. Bush. She was quoted as saying "We're gonna sing this for George Bush because he's out of here, people!".

In 2008, Raitt donated a song to the Aid Still Required's CD to assist with relief efforts in Southeast Asia from the 2004 tsunami. Raitt worked with Reverb, a non-profit environmental organization, for her 2005 fall/winter and 2006 spring/summer/fall tours. Raitt is part of the No Nukes group, which opposes the expansion of nuclear power. In 2007, No Nukes recorded a music video of a new version of the Buffalo Springfield song "For What It's Worth". During the 2008 Democratic primary campaign, Raitt, along with Jackson Browne and bassist James "Hutch" Hutchinson, performed at campaign appearances for candidate John Edwards.

During the 2016 Democratic primary campaign, Raitt endorsed Vermont Senator Bernie Sanders.

== Discography ==
- Bonnie Raitt (1971)
- Give It Up (1972)
- Takin' My Time (1973)
- Streetlights (1974)
- Home Plate (1975)
- Sweet Forgiveness (1977)
- The Glow (1979)
- Green Light (1982)
- Nine Lives (1986)
- Nick of Time (1989)
- Luck of the Draw (1991)
- Longing in Their Hearts (1994)
- Fundamental (1998)
- Silver Lining (2002)
- Souls Alike (2005)
- Slipstream (2012)
- Dig In Deep (2016)
- Just Like That... (2022)

== Guitar ==
Raitt's principal touring guitar is a customized Fender Stratocaster that she nicknamed Brownie. This became the basis for a signature model in 1996. Raitt was the first female musician to receive a signature Fender line.

My brown Strat—the body is a '65 and the neck is from some time after that. It's kind of a hybrid that I got for $120 at 3 o' clock in the morning in 1969. It's the one without the paint, and I've used that for every gig since 1969.

== Awards ==
Grammy Awards

†: Not a Grammy Award, but awarded by The Recording Academy

Year	Nominee / work	Award	Result
1980	"You're Gonna Get What's Coming"	Best Female Rock Vocal Performance	Nominated
1983	"Green Light"	Best Female Rock Vocal Performance	Nominated
1987	"No Way to Treat a Lady"	Best Female Rock Vocal Performance	Nominated
1990	Nick of Time	Album of the Year	Won
1990	Nick of Time	Best Female Rock Vocal Performance	Won
1990	"Nick of Time"	Best Female Pop Vocal Performance	Won
1990	"I'm in the Mood" (with John Lee Hooker)	Best Traditional Blues Recording	Won
1992	Luck of the Draw	Album of the Year	Nominated
1992	Luck of the Draw	Best Rock Vocal Solo Performance	Won
1992	"Something to Talk About"	Record of the Year	Nominated
1992	"Something to Talk About"	Best Female Pop Vocal Performance	Won
1992	"Good Man, Good Woman"	Best Rock Performance by a Duo or Group With Vocal	Won
1992	Bonnie Raitt	MusiCares Person of the Year^{†}	Won
1995	Longing in Their Hearts	Album of the Year	Nominated
1995	Longing in Their Hearts	Best Pop Vocal Album	Won
1995	"Love Sneakin' Up On You"	Record of the Year	Nominated
1995	"Love Sneakin' Up On You"	Best Female Rock Vocal Performance	Nominated
1995	"Longing in Their Hearts"	Best Female Pop Vocal Performance	Nominated
1996	"You Got It"	Best Female Pop Vocal Performance	Nominated
1997	Road Tested	Best Rock Album	Nominated
1997	"Burning Down the House"	Best Female Rock Vocal Performance	Nominated
1997	"SRV Shuffle"	Best Rock Instrumental Performance	Won
1999	"Kisses Sweeter Than Wine" (with Jackson Browne)	Best Pop Collaboration with Vocals	Nominated
2003	"Gnawin' on It"	Best Female Rock Vocal Performance	Nominated
2004	"Time of Our Lives"	Best Female Rock Vocal Performance	Nominated
2006	"I Will Not Be Broken"	Best Female Pop Vocal Performance	Nominated
2013	Slipstream	Best Americana Album	Won
2022	Herself	Grammy Lifetime Achievement Award	Won
2023	"Just Like That"	Song of the Year	Won
2023	"Just Like That"	Best American Roots Song	Won
2023	Just Like That...	Best Americana Album	Nominated
2023	"Made Up Mind"	Best Americana Performance	Won

Americana Music Honors and Awards

Year	Nominee / work	Award	Result
2012	Herself	Lifetime Achievement Award for Performance	Won
2016	Herself	Artist of the Year	Nominated
2023	"Just Like That"	Song of the Year	Won

Rock and Roll Hall of Fame

Year	Nominee / work	Award	Result
2000	Herself	Hall of Fame induction	Won

Other awards

- In 1992, Raitt was awarded an Honorary Doctorate of Music from Berklee College of Music.
- In 1997, Raitt was awarded the Harvard Arts Medal.
- In 2017, Raitt was honored with a Lifetime Achievement Award from the National Guitar Museum.
- In 2018, Raitt received the People's Voice Award from the Folk Alliance International Awards in recognition of her activism.
- In 2022, Raitt received the Icon Award at the Billboard Women in Music Awards.
- In 2024, Raitt received the Kennedy Center Honor.
