= Luck of the Draw (album) =

Studio album by Bonnie Raitt
- Released: June 25, 1991
- Recorded: September 1990 – February 1991
- Studios: Ocean Way Recording, Capitol Studios, and Conway Studios (Hollywood, California)
- Genre: Blues rock
- Length: 53:39
- Label: Capitol
- Producers: Bonnie Raitt; Don Was

Bonnie Raitt chronology
Nick of Time (1989)	Luck of the Draw (1991)	Longing in Their Hearts (1994)

Singles from Luck of the Draw
- 1. "Something to Talk About" Released: May 20, 1991; 2. "I Can't Make You Love Me" Released: October 22, 1991; 3. "Not the Only One" Released: January 1992

Professional ratings
Review scores
Source	Rating
AllMusic	4.5/5 stars
Calgary Herald	A−
Chicago Tribune	3.5/4 stars
Robert Christgau	A
Entertainment Weekly	A
Los Angeles Times	3.5/5 stars
Orlando Sentinel	5/5 stars
Rolling Stone	4/5 stars
The Windsor Star	A

Luck of the Draw is the eleventh studio album by Bonnie Raitt, released in 1991.

After being nominated for Grammy awards in four different categories for the album Nick of Time, Raitt went for a creative retreat in Northern California to begin work on Luck of the Draw. "I did it on purpose to see if I could come up with anything," Raitt said in 1991. "In case I won, I wanted to make sure that I had done some writing and didn't feel that Nick of Time was a fluke. I didn't want to win just 'cause I quit drinking and spent twenty years not making any money, you know? There wasn't enough. So I basically forced myself to go to songwriting boot camp. There were three of four days when it didn't happen — but because I didn't have alcohol or unhappiness or anything to get in the way, it started to open up and I started three of the four songs of mine that are on this album. And then it didn't matter if I won or not, because I had proved to myself that it was okay."

The album surpassed Nick of Time's commercial success, having sold seven million copies in the United States alone by 2010, and was supported by a 180-date tour from 1991 to 1993. It replicated much of her U.S. success overseas as well, selling two million in France and Italy. It remains Raitt's biggest-selling recording to date.

In the liner notes, Raitt dedicated this album to blues guitarist Stevie Ray Vaughan, who died in 1990 and had encouraged her to stop abusing alcohol, writing: "still burning bright".

== Track listing ==
Luck of the Draw
No.	Title	Writer(s)	Length
1.	"Something to Talk About"	Shirley Eikhard	3:47
2.	"Good Man, Good Woman"	Cecil Womack; Linda Womack	3:33
3.	"I Can't Make You Love Me"	Mike Reid; Allen Shamblin	5:32
4.	"Tangled and Dark"	Bonnie Raitt	4:52
5.	"Come to Me"	Raitt	4:20
6.	"No Business"	John Hiatt	4:24
7.	"One Part Be My Lover"	Raitt; Michael O'Keefe	5:06
8.	"Not the Only One"	Paul Brady	5:03
9.	"Papa Come Quick (Jody and Chico)"	Billy Vera; Chip Taylor; Richard Hirsch	2:43
10.	"Slow Ride"	Bonnie Hayes; Larry John McNally; André Pessis	3:59
11.	"Luck of the Draw"	Brady	5:17
12.	"All at Once"	Raitt	5:03
Total length:			53:39

Notes

- "Good Man, Good Woman" is a Grammy Award-winning duet with Delbert McClinton and also appears on his album, Never Been Rocked Enough.

== Personnel ==
- Bonnie Raitt – vocals, backing vocals (1, 3, 4, 7, 8, 10), acoustic guitar (1, 2, 5, 6, 9, 11), electric guitar (1), slide guitar (1, 2, 4, 10), horn arrangements (4), electric piano (7, 12)
- Scott Thurston – keyboards (1, 11), acoustic guitar (10), electric guitar (10, 11)
- Ivan Neville – Hammond B3 organ (2), keyboards (4)
- Bruce Hornsby – acoustic piano (3), additional keyboards (3)
- Benmont Tench – Hammond C3 organ (3, 7, 8, 11), acoustic piano (8)
- Ian McLagan – Hammond B3 organ (5)
- Steve Conn – accordion (9)
- Stephen Bruton – acoustic guitar (1), backing vocals (9)
- Randy Jacobs – electric guitar (2)
- Johnny Lee Schell – electric guitar (5)
- John Hiatt – guitars (6), backing vocals (6)
- Mark Goldenberg – acoustic guitar (8, 10)
- Richard Thompson – electric guitar (8, 11), backing vocals (11)
- Billy Vera – electric guitar (9)
- Robben Ford – lead guitar (10)
- James "Hutch" Hutchinson – bass guitar (1–6, 8, 10, 11)
- Don Was – jug bass (9)
- Curt Bisquera – drums (1, 2)
- Ricky Fataar – drums (1, 4–6, 8–10)
- Tony Braunagel – drums (3)
- Jeff Porcaro – drums (11)
- Debra Dobkin – percussion (1, 2, 4–6, 8–10), backing vocals (10)
- Paulinho da Costa – percussion (3, 7, 11, 12)
- Delbert McClinton – harmonica (2), vocals (2)
- Tower of Power Horns – horns (4)
  - Stephen "Doc" Kupka – baritone saxophone
  - Emilio Castillo – tenor saxophone
  - Steve Grove – tenor saxophone
  - Greg Adams – trumpet, horn arrangements
  - Lee Thornburg – trumpet
- Phil Cunningham – penny whistle (7)
- Aaron Shaw – bagpipes (12)
- David Campbell – string arrangements and conductor (12)
- Larry Corbett – cello (12)
- Ernest Ehrhardt – cello (12)
- Dennis Karmazyn – cello (12)
- Carole Castillo – viola (12)
- Rick Gerding – viola (12)
- Pamela Goldsmith – viola (12)
- Novi Novog – viola (12)
- Sweet Pea Atkinson – backing vocals (1, 5, 10)
- Sir Harry Bowens – backing vocals (1, 5, 10)
- David Lasley – backing vocals (1, 3, 7, 8)
- Arnold McCuller – backing vocals (3, 5, 7, 8, 10)
- Kris Kristofferson – backing vocals (5)
- Paul Brady – backing vocals (8, 11)
- Glen Clark – backing vocals (9)
- Daniel Timms – backing vocals (9)

== Production ==
- Bonnie Raitt – producer
- Don Was – producer
- Ed Cherney – recording, mixing
- Bryant Arnett – assistant engineer
- Ray Blair – assistant engineer
- Dan Bosworth – assistant engineer
- Charlie Paakkari – assistant engineer
- Doug Sax – mastering at The Mastering Lab (Hollywood, California)
- Paul Jamieson – drum catering
- Marsha Burns – production coordinator
- Tommy Steele – art direction
- Jeffery Fey – design
- Merlyn Rosenberg – photography
- Margo Chase – logo, lettering
- Danny Goldberg – management
- Jeffrey Hersh – management

== Charts ==
=== Album ===
==== Weekly charts ====
Chart (1991–92)	Peak position
Australian Albums (ARIA)	16
Canada Top Albums/CDs (RPM)	5
German Albums (Offizielle Top 100)	55
New Zealand Albums (RMNZ)	6
Dutch Albums (Album Top 100)	26
Norwegian Albums (VG-lista)	16
Swedish Albums (Sverigetopplistan)	37
Swiss Albums (Schweizer Hitparade)	16
UK Albums (Official Charts)	38
US Billboard 200	2
US Top Catalog Albums (Billboard)	15

==== Year-end charts ====
Chart (1991)	Position
Canada Top Albums/CDs (RPM)	26
US Billboard 200	36
Chart (1992)	Position
New Zealand Albums (RMNZ)	42
US Billboard 200	16

==== Decade-end charts ====
Chart (1999)	Peak position
US Billboard 200	72

=== Singles ===
Year	Single	Peak positions			
Year	Single	US	US AC	US Rock	UK
1991	"Something to Talk About"	5	5	12	—
1991	"I Can't Make You Love Me"	18	9	—	50
1991	"Slow Ride"	—	—	28	—
1992	"Not the Only One"	34	2	—	—
1992	"Come to Me"	—	10	—	—
1993	"All At Once"	—	17	—	—

== Certifications ==
Region	Certification	Certified units/sales
Canada (Music Canada)	4× Platinum	400,000^{^}
New Zealand (RMNZ)	Gold	7,500^{^}
United States (RIAA)	7× Platinum	7,000,000^{^}
^{^} Shipments figures based on certification alone.

== Awards ==
Grammy Awards

Year	Winner	Category
1991	"Good Man, Good Woman"	Best Rock Performance By A Duo Or Group With Vocal
1991	Luck of the Draw	Best Female Rock Vocal Performance
1991	"Something to Talk About"	Best Female Pop Vocal Performance
