= Something to Talk About (Bonnie Raitt song) =

1991 single by Bonnie Raitt

Single by Bonnie Raitt

from the album Luck of the Draw
- Released: May 20, 1991
- Recorded: November 1990−February 1991
- Genre: Blues-pop
- Length: 3:47
- Label: Capitol
- Songwriter: Shirley Eikhard
- Producers: Bonnie Raitt, Don Was

Bonnie Raitt singles chronology
"Love Letter" (1990)	"Something to Talk About" (1991)	"I Can't Make You Love Me" (1991)

"Something to Talk About" is a song written by Canadian singer-songwriter Shirley Eikhard and recorded by American singer Bonnie Raitt for her 1991 album Luck of the Draw. It was serviced to US radio on June 3, 1991. Two single versions were released: a 7-inch single with the B-side "One Part Be My Lover" and a 12-inch single with these two songs and "I Ain't Gonna Let You Break My Heart Again". In turn, this song was included on the EP version of Raitt’s 2000 single of "The Fundamental Things" taken from her 1998 album Fundamental. It was also included in 2003’s greatest hits compilation The Best of Bonnie Raitt. Live versions appear on 1995's Road Tested and 2006's Bonnie Raitt and Friends.

== Background ==
Anne Murray wanted to record this song in 1985, but her producers did not think it would be a hit. She still called the album that she released that year Something to Talk About even though it did not include this song.

== Chart performance ==
The song was popular on multiple formats of radio: it peaked at number five on the US Billboard Adult Contemporary chart, number 12 on the Album Rock Tracks chart, and number five on the Hot 100, becoming Raitt's highest-charting hit and is her only single to reach the top 10 on the chart. It was also a success in Canada, where it rose to number three on the RPM 100 Hit Tracks chart, and in New Zealand, where it reached number 33.

== Music video ==
The video for the song was directed by Matt Mahurin. It features Raitt with two guitarists performing the song at a community event, while other scenes show older couples dancing, people in costumes, and many people in a swimming pool.

== Nominations and awards ==
Raitt won the Grammy Award for Best Female Pop Vocal Performance at the Grammy Awards of 1992 for her recording of this song (Oleta Adams, Mariah Carey, Amy Grant and Whitney Houston were the other finalists). The track also received a nomination for Record of the Year, losing to "Unforgettable" by Nat King Cole and Natalie Cole.

Eikhard received a Juno Award nomination as Songwriter of the Year at the Juno Awards of 1992, and later a SOCAN Classics award from the Society of Composers, Authors and Music Publishers of Canada.

== Charts ==
=== Weekly charts ===
Chart (1991)	Peak position
Australia (ARIA)	57
Canada Top Singles (RPM)	3
Canada Adult Contemporary (RPM)	4
Germany (GfK)	57
Netherlands (Single Top 100)	59
New Zealand (Recorded Music NZ)	33
US Billboard Hot 100	5
US Adult Contemporary (Billboard)	5
US Mainstream Rock Airplay (Billboard)	12
US Cash Box Top 100	8

=== Year-end charts ===
Chart (1991)	Position
Canada Top Singles (RPM)	18
Canada Adult Contemporary (RPM)	33
US Billboard Hot 100	55
US Adult Contemporary (Billboard)	27

== Certifications ==
Region	Certification	Certified units/sales
New Zealand (RMNZ)	Platinum	30,000^{‡}
^{‡} Sales+streaming figures based on certification alone.

== Release history ==
Region	Date	Format(s)	Label(s)	Ref.
United States	May 20, 1991	Album rock; adult contemporary radio	Capitol	
Japan	June 21, 1991	Mini-CD	Capitol	
Australia	July 8, 1991	7-inch vinyl; CD; cassette	Capitol	

== Cover versions ==
Year	Singer/group	Album	Comments
1998	Willie Clayton	Something to Talk About	
2000	Tom Ball, Kenny Blackwell, Dennis "Cannonball" Caplinger, Tom Corbett, Rudi Ekstein, Curtis Jones, John Moore, Bob Nichols, David West and Gabe Witcher	Angel from Montgomery: Bluegrass Celebrates Bonnie Rait	instrumental bluegrass version on Raitt tribute album
2003	St. Lawrence University Sinners	Sing	a cappella version
2005	Wenche	I’m a Country Girl	
2006	Yester, Belland & Somerville	Triple Gold	
2007	Eddie Levert Sr. & Gerald Levert	Something to Talk About	
2007	SHeDAISY	The Guardian Soundtrack	
2007	Melanie Joy Hall	Falling to the Moon	
2007	Sanjaya Malakar	American Idol Season 6: Greatest Hits: Collector's Edition	
2009	Heidi Ellis	Maritime Idol 2008	
2010	Note-oriety	Get Gone	a cappella version
2012	X-Factors	The Pink Album	a cappella version
2013	Jennifer Love Hewitt	N/A	sung on her show "The Client List"
2017	Britney Spears	N/A	sung on her "Piece Of Me" residency.

"Something to Talk About" was utilized as the theme for the 1995 sitcom Women of the House (CBS-TV): this version was sung by the song's composer Shirley Eikhard.

In 2007, the country music group SHeDAISY recorded a cover of "Something to Talk About" for the soundtrack to the film The Guardian.

The song has been performed numerous times on American Idol, including by Kimberly Caldwell in season 2, Fantasia Barrino in season 3, Kellie Pickler in season 5 and Sanjaya Malakar in season 6. Sanjaya changed "how about love" from the chorus to "other than hair" during his farewell performance.

David Cross and Jon Benjamin perform a live duet on the 2007 DVD The Comedians Of Comedy: Live at the Troubadour. It was sung by Will Ferrell in the 2008 film Step Brothers and also featured in the 1995 film Something to Talk About starring Julia Roberts and Dennis Quaid.

Also, in 2008, the song was covered by Daryl Hall on his video podcast show, Live From Daryl's House with special guest, KT Tunstall.

In August 2017, Britney Spears covered the song during her Las Vegas residency show Britney: Piece of Me.
