= Fundamental (Bonnie Raitt album) =

Album by Bonnie Raitt

Studio album by Bonnie Raitt
- Released: April 7, 1998
- Studios: Sound Factory, Hollywood, California
- Genre: Rock
- Length: 44:03
- Label: Capitol
- Producers: Bonnie Raitt; Tchad Blake; Mitchell Froom

Bonnie Raitt chronology
| Road Tested (1995) | Fundamental (1998) | Silver Lining (2002) |

Professional ratings
Review scores
| Source | Rating |
|---|---|
| AllMusic | 2.5/5 stars |
| Chicago Tribune | 3/4 stars |
| Robert Christgau | A− |
| Entertainment Weekly | B |
| Rolling Stone | 4/5 stars |

Fundamental is the thirteenth studio album by Bonnie Raitt, released on April 7, 1998, by Capitol Records.

== Track listing ==
1. "The Fundamental Things" (David Batteau, John Cody, Lawrence Klein) – 3:45
2. "Cure for Love" (David Hidalgo, Louie Pérez) – 4:11
3. "Round & Round" (Willie Dixon, J. B. Lenoir) – 3:16
4. "Spit of Love" (Raitt) – 4:44
5. "Lover's Will" (John Hiatt) – 4:30
6. "Blue for No Reason" (Paul Brady, Raitt) – 4:13
7. "Meet Me Half Way" (Beth Nielsen Chapman, Raitt, Annie Roboff) – 4:16
8. "I'm on Your Side" (Raitt) – 3:44
9. "Fearless Love" (Dillon O'Brian) – 4:06
10. "I Need Love" (Joey Spampinato) – 2:41
11. "One Belief Away" (Paul Brady, Dillon O'Brian, Raitt) – 4:37

== Personnel ==
- Bonnie Raitt – lead vocals, slide guitar, horn arrangements (1, 5, 11), keyboards (4, 8), acoustic guitar (8)
- Mitchell Froom – keyboards (1–5, 7–11), Moog bass (4), additional keyboards (6), accordion (9)
- David Hidalgo – guitars, bass (1, 2, 6–9), backing vocals (2)
- Steve Donnelly – rhythm guitar, backing vocals (3)
- Joey Spampinato – bass guitar (3, 10), backing vocals (3, 10)
- Pete Thomas – drums, percussion

with:

- Scott Thurston – keyboards (5)
- Terry Adams – keyboards (10), backing vocals (10)
- James "Hutch" Hutchinson – bass guitar (5, 11)
- Tony Braunagel – tambourine (5)
- Marty Grebb – tenor saxophone (1), baritone saxophone (5)
- Jimmy Roberts – saxophones (5)
- Joe Sublett – tenor saxophone (11)
- Nick Lane – trombone (5), euphonium (5)
- Darrell Leonard – trumpet (1, 11)
- Rick Braun – trumpet (5)
- Sir Harry Bowens – backing vocals (1)
- Terence Forsythe – backing vocals (1)
- Renée Geyer – backing vocals (4)
- Dillon O'Brian – backing vocals (9)
- Mark Shark – harmony vocals (11)
- Jeff Young – harmony vocals (11)

== Production ==
- Producers – Bonnie Raitt, Tchad Blake and Mitchell Froom.
- Recorded and Mixed by Tchad Blake
- Home Studio Engineer – Tom Corwin
- Assistant Engineer – S. Husky Höskulds
- Mastered by Bob Ludwig at Gateway Mastering (Portland, ME).
- Art Direction and Design – Norman Moore
- Photography – Dana Tynan
- Make-up – Robin Fredriksz
- Stylist – Kate Lindsay
- Tour Oversight – Tim Bennett
- Management – Jeffrey Hersh, Ron Stone and Renata Kanclerz.

== Charts ==
Chart performance for Fundamental
| Chart (1998) | Peak position |
|---|---|
| Australian Albums (ARIA) | 149 |
| United States (Billboard 200) | 17 |

== Certifications ==
| Region | Certification | Certified units/sales |
|---|---|---|
| Canada (Music Canada) | Gold | 50,000^{^} |
| United States (RIAA) | Gold | 500,000^{^} |
^{^} Shipments figures based on certification alone.
