= Souls Alike =

Studio album by Bonnie Raitt
- Released: September 13, 2005
- Studios: The Sound Factory (Hollywood, California); Studio D Recording (Sausalito, California); Lairiope Studios (Santa Monica, California)
- Genre: Rock
- Length: 46:36
- Label: Capitol
- Producers: Bonnie Raitt; Tchad Blake

Bonnie Raitt chronology
Silver Lining (2002)	Souls Alike (2005)	Slipstream (2012)

Professional ratings
Aggregate scores
Source	Rating
Metacritic	(72/100)
Review scores
Source	Rating
Allmusic	4/5 stars
Philadelphia Daily News	(A−)
Chicago Tribune	(mixed)
Morning Call	3/5 stars
musicOMH	(favourable)
Paste	(favourable)
Philadelphia Inquirer	3/4 stars
Rolling Stone	3.5/5 stars
Associated Press	4/5 stars
The Mercury News	3.5/5 stars
USA Today	3.5/4 stars

Souls Alike is the fifteenth studio album by Bonnie Raitt, released in 2005 on Capitol Records. The album peaked at No. 19 on the US Billboard 200.

== Critical reception ==
Souls Alike received generally positive reviews from music critics. At Metacritic, which assigns a normalized rating out of 100 to reviews from mainstream critics, the album received an average score of 72 based on 6 reviews, which indicates "generally favourable reviews".

Edna Gunderson of USA Today wrote "Full of poignant ballads and rootsy romps, Souls draws on Raitt's defiance, grace and earthy authenticity, allowing her to stretch stylistically without crowding the signature attractions of her brandied vocals and stinging slide guitar." Brad Kava of The Mercury News proclaimed, "There are some touches of world music, but no real surprises. What you have is an album that is rock solid all the way through and continues her run as an uncompromising classic artist in the vein of Bob Dylan and Tom Petty."

== Singles ==
"I Will Not Be Broken" peaked at No. 27 on the US Billboard Adult Contemporary chart. This tune was also Grammy nominated in the category of Best Female Pop Vocal Performance.

== Track listing ==
No.	Title	Writer(s)	Length
1.	"I Will Not Be Broken"	Gordon Kennedy, Wayne Kirkpatrick, Tommy Sims	3:41
2.	"God Was in the Water"	Randall Bramblett, Davis Causey	5:17
3.	"Love on One Condition"	Jon Cleary	3:43
4.	"So Close"	Tony Arata, George Marinelli, Pete Wasner	3:22
5.	"Trinkets"	Emory Joseph	5:02
6.	"Crooked Crown"	David Batteau, Maia Sharp	3:49
7.	"Unnecessarily Mercenary"	Jon Cleary	3:51
8.	"I Don't Want Anything to Change"	Stephanie Chapman, Liz Rose, Maia Sharp	4:29
9.	"Deep Water"	John Capek, Marc Jordan	3:58
10.	"Two Lights in the Nighttime"	Lee Clayton, Pat McLaughlin	4:22
11.	"The Bed I Made"	David Batteau, Maia Sharp	4:59

== Personnel ==
- Bonnie Raitt – lead vocals, slide guitar, acoustic guitar (8)
- Jon Cleary – acoustic piano (1–8, 10, 11), Hammond B3 organ, Wurlitzer organ, rhythm guitar (3), backing vocals (3, 4, 7, 9)
- Mitchell Froom – Minimoog (1), additional acoustic piano (2), Rhodes piano (2), dolceola (4), additional Wurlitzer organ (6), additional baritone saxophone (6), additional Hammond B3 organ (8), additional orchestration (9)
- John Capek – acoustic piano (9), strings (9), bass guitar (9), drum loops (9), percussion (9)
- George Marinelli – electric guitar, acoustic guitar, backing vocals (4, 10)
- David Batteau – synth guitar (6)
- James "Hutch" Hutchinson – bass guitar (1–8, 10, 11)
- Ricky Fataar – drums, percussion
- Maia Sharp – backing vocals (1, 2, 6), baritone saxophone (6), tenor saxophone (11)
- Arnold McCuller – backing vocals (1, 5, 7, 9)
- Sweet Pea Atkinson – backing vocals (5, 7)

== Production ==
- Producer – Bonnie Raitt
- Co-Producer, Recording and Mixing – Tchad Blake
- Additional Recording and Mixing – Kevin Dean
- Assistant Engineers – David Boucher, Ryan Doordan, Michael Rodriguez and Scott Wiley.
- Mastered by Bob Ludwig at Gateway Mastering (Portland, ME).
- Project Coordinator – Kathy Kane
- Art Direction, Design and Background Photography – Norman Moore
- Photography – Sam Jones
- Stylist – Kate Lindsay
- Make-Up – Joanna Schlip
- Management – Annie Heller-Gutwillig and Chloe Monahan

== Charts ==
Chart (2005)	Peak position
US Billboard 200	19
