= Ricky Fataar =

South African musician (b. 1952)

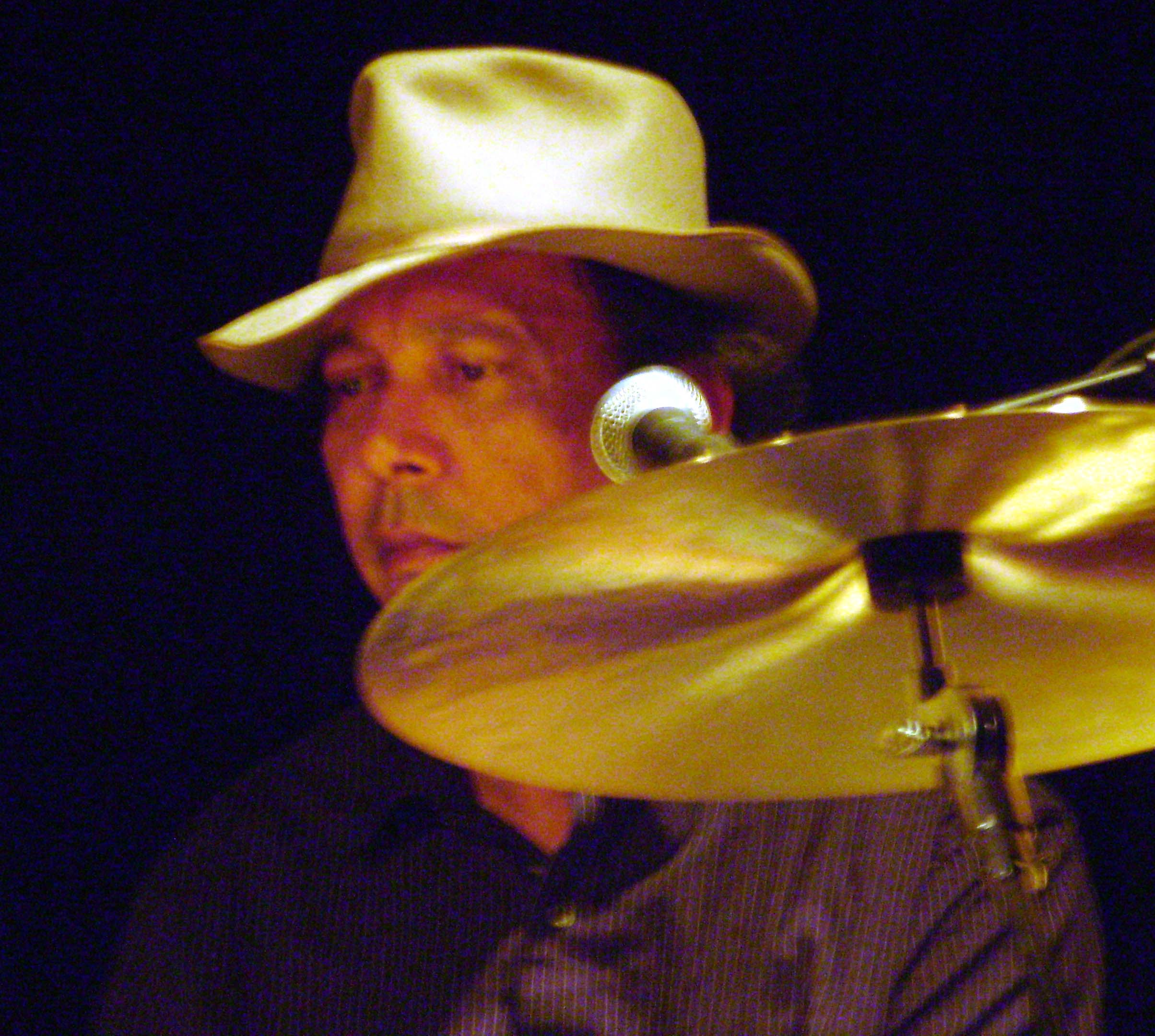
- Fataar in 2008

Background information
- Born: 5 September 1952 (age 74); Durban, Natal, Union of South Africa
- Genres: Rock; blues; jazz
- Occupations: Musician; songwriter; record producer
- Instruments: Drums; guitar; keyboards; vocals
- Years active: 1963–present
- Member of: Bonnie Raitt
- Formerly of: The Flames; The Beach Boys; The Rutles
- Spouse: Penelope Tree

Ricky Fataar (born 5 September 1952) is a South African musician of Malay descent who has performed as both a drummer and a guitarist. He gained fame as an actor in The Rutles: All You Need Is Cash, a spoof on the Beatles, in which he performed as a member of the Rutles. He was also a member of the Beach Boys between 1971 and 1974, and has been the drummer for Bonnie Raitt for the last 35 years. Fataar is also a record producer, and has worked on projects scoring music to film and television.

== Career ==
=== The Flames ===
Fataar's first childhood band was the Flames, a band from his birthplace of Durban, South Africa. He joined the band at the age of nine. The band made several recordings as well as touring all over southern Africa and before long they became quite popular in South Africa. By the time he was twelve years old he had already won the honour of being voted as the "Best Rock Drummer in South Africa".

In 1968, the band moved to London and began touring in the United Kingdom. On one of their tours, they were spotted by a founding member of the Beach Boys, Carl Wilson. He was impressed by their talent and offered to sign them to the Beach Boys new record label, Brother Records. The band moved to Los Angeles and they recorded and released their 1970 album The Flame with Carl Wilson producing the album.

=== The Beach Boys ===
The Flames disbanded in late 1970, and Fataar and his former Flame bandmate Blondie Chaplin were recruited by the Beach Boys, in March 1972. Fataar was asked to play drums for the band after drummer Dennis Wilson suffered a debilitating hand accident. The duo recorded two albums with the Beach Boys, and began touring with them in 1971. The 1972 Beach Boys album Carl and the Passions – "So Tough" featured musical and vocal contributions from Chaplin and Fataar. It also included two songs written by the duo, "Here She Comes" and "Hold On Dear Brother". On the band's next album, Holland, released a year later, both musicians recorded, and provided backing vocals, including the hit single "Sail On, Sailor", on which Chaplin sang as lead vocalist.

They also collaborated with Carl Wilson and Mike Love on the song "Leaving This Town". 1973 saw the first live album The Beach Boys in Concert, upon which Fataar performed. It featured a live version of the previously unreleased Chaplin/Fataar/Love collaboration "We Got Love", which was originally intended to be released on the Holland album, but was removed from the running order to make way for single "Sail On, Sailor". Both Fataar and Chaplin would later depart the band, with Fataar only appearing on the tracks "It's OK" and "That Same Song" off the Beach Boys' next studio album, 1976's 15 Big Ones.

In March 2019, Big Noise's Al Gomes and Connie Watrous presented a plaque from Roger Williams University to Fataar in Providence, RI at a sold-out Bonnie Raitt/James Taylor concert. The plaque commemorates the Beach Boys' 22 September 1971 concert at The Ramada Inn in Portsmouth, Rhode Island, now Roger Williams University's Baypoint Inn & Conference Center. The concert was the first-ever appearance of Fataar as an official member of the band, essentially changing the Beach Boys' live and recording line-up into a multi-cultural group.

=== The Rutles ===
In 1978, Fataar starred in All You Need Is Cash, a mockumentary film known more commonly as The Rutles, a spoof on the real life history of the Beatles, which was a follow-up to a Saturday Night Live television sketch. The Beatlesque music for the Rutles was written by Neil Innes, formerly of the Bonzo Dog Doo-Dah Band and musical collaborator with Monty Python. Fataar's character was Stig O'Hara, the band's guitarist (analogous to George Harrison). He speaks no dialogue in the film, being sent up as "the quiet one" in it. Fataar's then wife, Penelope Tree, also appeared in All You Need Is Cash, as Stig's wife, Penelope. The band's two records, The Rutles and Archeology, featured him playing guitar, bass, sitar, drums, and singing. He would also go on to record a single with Eric Idle as 'Dirk & Stig' titled, "Mr. Sheene" / "Ging Gang Goolie".

== Personal life ==
Fataar was married to Penelope Tree, English fashion model prominent in the sixties, who played his character's wife in The Rutles. The couple moved from Los Angeles to Sydney in 1981. They have a daughter together, Paloma Fataar, who is now a graduate of Bard College and a student of Tibetan Buddhism and music.

== Collaborations ==
With Ryan Adams

- Love Is Hell (Lost Highway Records, 2004)

With David Cassidy

- The Higher They Climb (RCA Records, 1975)
- Home Is Where the Heart Is (RCA Records, 1976)

With Peter Cetera

- Peter Cetera (Warner Bros. Records, 1981)

With Crowded House

- Woodface (Capitol Records, 1991)

With Tim Finn

- Escapade (Mushroom Records, 1983)
- Before & After (Capitol Records, 1993)

With Tim Hardin

- Unforgiven (San Francisco Sound, 1980)

With Steve Harley

- Hobo with a Grin (EMI, 1978)

With Etta James

- Seven Year Itch (Island Records, 1989)

With Elton John

- Duets (Geffen, 1993)

With Wendy Matthews

- Émigré (rooArt, 1990)
- Lily (rooArt, 1992)

With Delbert McClinton

- Nothing Personal (New West, 2001)

With Jenny Morris

- Body and Soul (Warner Bros. Records, 1987)
- Shiver (Warner Bros. Records, 1989)
- Honeychild (East West Records, 1991)

With Keb' Mo'

- Just like You (Epic Records, 1996)

With Anne Murray

- Anne Murray (EMI, 1996)

With Robert Palmer

- Heavy Nova (Manhattan Records, 1988)

With Bonnie Raitt

- Green Light (Warner Bros. Records, 1982)
- Nick of Time (Capitol Records, 1989)
- Luck of the Draw (Capitol Records, 1991)
- Longing in Their Hearts (Capitol Records, 1994)
- Silver Lining (Capitol Records, 2002)
- Souls Alike (Capitol Records, 2005)
- Slipstream (Redwing Records, 2012)
- Dig In Deep (Redwing Records, 2016)
- Just Like That... (Redwing Records, 2022)

With Carrie Rodriguez

- The New Bye & Bye (Ninth Street Opus, 2010)

With Boz Scaggs

- Some Change (Virgin Records, 1994)
- Fade Into Light (MVP Japan, 1996)
- Come on Home (Virgin Records, 1997)
- Out of the Blues (Concord Records, 2018)

With John Scofield

- Piety Street (Universal Classics, 2009)

With Broderick Smith

- Broderick Smith (Wheatley, 1984)

With Phoebe Snow

- Something Real (Elektra Records, 1989)

With Pops Staples

- Peace to the Neighborhood (Point Blank Records, 1992)

With Jennifer Warnes

- Shot Through the Heart (Arista Records, 1979)

With Dennis Wilson

- Pacific Ocean Blue (Caribou Records, 1977)

With Womack & Womack

- Conscience (Island Records, 1988)

== Awards and nominations ==
=== ARIA Music Awards ===
The ARIA Music Awards is an annual awards ceremony that recognises excellence, innovation, and achievement across all genres of Australian music. They commenced in 1987.

Year	Nominee / work	Award	Result	Ref.
1993	Spotswood	Best Original Soundtrack, Cast or Show Album	Nominated	

=== Countdown Australian Music Awards ===
Countdown was an Australian pop music TV series on national broadcaster ABC-TV from 1974 to 1987, it presented music awards from 1979 to 1987, initially in conjunction with magazine TV Week. The TV Week / Countdown Awards were a combination of popular-voted and peer-voted awards.

Year	Nominee / work	Award	Result
1983	himself (with Mark Moffatt) for work with Tim Finn, Renée Geyer & Pat Wilson)	Best Record Producer of the Year	Won
1984	himself (with Mark Moffatt)	Best Producer	Nominated

== Other projects ==
=== Film and television scores ===
Fataar has also combined his talents as an actor and a musician, developing musical scores for both film and television. An example includes the composition of the score for an Australian film Spotswood.

=== As recording producer ===
Working in his capacity as producer, Fataar has produced the music for various films that include High Tide and Les Patterson Saves the World.

=== Other work ===
Fataar has worked as a session musician, notably for Ian McLagan as well as other artists, as a drummer. Fataar emigrated to Australia in 1978 where he recorded with and co-produced albums for Tim Finn, played the drums on the Split Enz song "Message To My Girl", and also worked with Crowded House, Jenny Morris, Peter Blakeley, and Wendy Matthews as well as various other artists.

In 1979, Fataar was introduced to Bonnie Raitt, and recorded on her Green Light album (1982) as a member of The Bump Band: contributing drums, percussion, and backing vocals on "Keep This Heart in Mind" and a writing credit on "I Can't Help Myself." Nick of Time (1989) was the first of her recordings to feature Fataar, along with James "Hutch" Hutchinson, the two becoming her longtime rhythm section. He continues to record and tour with her as a member of her band. Fataar continued to work in between other projects as a sideman for many artists, also on Peter Cetera's first album, usually as a drummer.

In 1985, he teamed up with Tim Finn once again, appearing in the Australian film The Coca-Cola Kid where they play in a band performing a jingle in the studio.

== See also ==
- The Monitors (Australian band)
