= Romeo discography =

Maserati Rome discography
- Studio albums: 4
- Extended plays: 5
- Singles: 14
- Music videos: 22
- Collaboration albums: 4
- Mixtapes: 4

This is the discography of American rapper and actor Romeo Miller, formerly known as Lil' Romeo, Romeo, or Maserati Rome. It consists of three studio albums, one independent album, three soundtracks, five Extended plays, five mixtapes, thirteen singles, two compilation albums, four collaboration albums, and twenty-two music videos. His music has been released on No Limit Records, Soulja Music Entertainment, The New No Limit, Priority Records, Universal Records, Koch Records, UrbanDigital Records, GoDigital Music Group & LPD Music along with his former record labels Guttar Music, Take A Stand, The Next Generation Entertainment and his current label No Limit Forever.

In 2001, Miller's debut album Lil 'Romeo charted on the US Billboard 200 at number six selling 200,000 copies making it Romeo's first top ten album and was later certified 2× Platinum in 2002. The album contained Romeo's most successful single to date "My Baby". A music video was made featuring cameos from a Michael Jackson imitator, Silkk Tha Shocker and Master P. In 2002, his next album Game Time, though not as successful as his previous effort (chart wise) charted at number thirty-three on the US Billboard 200. His next album Romeoland charted on the Billboard 200 at number seventy.

In 2005, Miller along with his father Master P & his Uncle Silkk the Shocker, reformed the pioneer rap group TRU and released their final album entitled The Truth. It charted on the US Billboard 200 at number fifty-four. The same year, Romeo would also release another collaboration entitled Young Ballers: The Hood Been Good to Us with his newly formed group at the time Rich Boyz. In 2006, Romeo would release his independent album entitled Lottery it charted on the Billboard 200 at number forty. Also In 2006, Miller released the soundtrack to his movie God's Gift, it was his first album released under his name changed to Romeo. In 2007, Romeo would collaborate again on a new album with his father Master P as the Miller Boyz entitled Hip Hop History, it did not chart on any Billboard charts. In 2009, Romeo released his second compilation album entitled Get Low it charted on the Billboard 200 at one-hundred-forty, making it Miller's first album to chart in four years.

In 2010, Miller formed his new group College Boyys and created a new label called The Next Generation Entertainment, and they released their debut album entitled Spring Break.

== Albums ==
=== Studio albums ===
List of studio albums, with selected chart positions and certifications
| Title | Album details | Peak chart positions | | Certifications |
| Title | Album details | US | US R&B | Certifications |
|---|---|---|---|---|
| Lil 'Romeo (as Lil' Romeo) | Released: July 3, 2001; Label: No Limit, Soulja Music, Priority; Formats: CD, MD, LP | 6 | 5 | RIAA: Gold |
| Game Time (as Lil' Romeo) | Released: December 17, 2002; Label: The New No Limit, Universal; Formats: CD, MD, LP | 33 | 10 | |
| Romeoland (as Lil' Romeo) | Released: September 21, 2004; Label: The New No Limit, Koch; Formats: CD, MD, LP | 70 | 29 | |
| Hidden Treasure | Released: December 15, 2019; Label: No Limit Forever; Formats: MD | — | — | |

=== Collaboration albums ===
List of collaboration albums, with selected details
| Title | Album details |
|---|---|
| Young Ballers: The Hood Been Good to Us (as Lil' Romeo) (with Rich Boyz) | Released: November 22, 2005; Label: Guttar Music; Format: MD, LP |
| Hip Hop History (as Romeo) (with Master P as Miller Boyz) | Released: September 4, 2007; Label: Take a Stand, UrbanDigital, GoDigital; Format: MD, LP |
| Spring Break (as Romeo) (with College Boyys) | Released: May 25, 2010; Label: The Next Generation, Hollywood Dream; Format: MD, LP |

=== Soundtrack albums ===
List of soundtrack albums
| Title | Album details |
|---|---|
| Romeo! TV Show (The Season) (as Lil' Romeo) | Released: November 8, 2005; Label: The New No Limit, Koch; Formats: CD, MD, LP |
| God's Gift: Music from the Motion Picture (as Romeo) | Released: December 12, 2006; Label: Guttar Music, H. Hood Cinema, UrbanDigital, GoDigital; Formats: MD, LP |
| Crush On U: Music from the Motion Picture (as Romeo) (with Forrest Lipton) | Released: April 3, 2007; Label: Little Big; Formats: MD, LP |

=== Mixtapes ===
Maserati Rome's mixtapes and details
| Title | Album details |
|---|---|
| Lottery (as Romeo) | Released: April 4, 2006; Label: Guttar Music, UrbanDigital, GoDigital; Formats: MD, LP |
| Patience Is a Virtue (as Romeo) | Released: February 16, 2010; Label: The Next Generation |
| I Am No Limit (as Maserati Rome) | Released: August 19, 2011; Label: No Limit Forever; Hosted by No Limit Forever |
| Inception (as Maserati Rome) | Released: August 19, 2012; Label: No Limit Forever; Hosted by No Limit Forever |
| We All We Got (as Maserati Rome) (with Money Mafia) | Released: January 5, 2015; Label: No Limit Forever; Retail Mixtape |
| Hustlin (as Maserati Rome) (with Money Mafia) | Released: April 20, 2015; Label: No Limit Forever |
| Fighting Monsters (as Maserati Rome) | Released: January 7, 2016; Label: No Limit Forever; Hosted by DJ €$¢Ø; Retail mixtape |

=== Compilation albums ===
List of compilation albums, with details
| Title | Album details |
|---|---|
| Greatest Hits (as Lil' Romeo) | Released: October 17, 2006; Label: Koch; Formats: CD, MD, LP |
| Gutta Music All-Stars (as Romeo) (with Various artist) | Released: May 15, 2007; Label: Guttar Music, UrbanDigital, GoDigital; Formats: MD, LP |
| Get Low (as Romeo) | Released: March 3, 2009; Label: The New No Limit, Take a Stand, UrbanDigital, GoDigital; Formats: MD, LP |

== Extended plays ==
| Year | Title |
|---|---|
| 2006 | God's Gift (Digital Exclusive) (as Romeo): Released: November 14, 2006; Label: Guttar Music, UrbanDigital, GoDigital; Format: digital download, EP |
| 2008 | Get Low Wit It (as Romeo): Released: June 17, 2008; Label: The New No Limit, Take A Stand, UrbanDigital, GoDigital; Format: Digital download, EP |
| 2010 | Famous Girl (as Romeo): Released: March 2, 2010; Label: The Next Generation, LPD Music; Format: Digital download, EP |
| 2010 | Monster (featuring Tempo)/Practice (as Romeo): Released: March 2, 2010; Label: The Next Generation, LPD Music; Format: Digital download, EP |
| 2011 | Don't Push Me (as Romeo): Released: January 11, 2011; Label: The Next Generation; Format: Digital download |

== Singles ==
=== As lead artist ===
List of singles as lead artist, with selected chart positions, showing year released and album name
| Title | Year | Peak chart positions | | | Album |
| Title | Year | US | US R&B | US Rap | Album |
|---|---|---|---|---|---|
| "My Baby" | 2001 | 3 | 1 | 1 | Lil' Romeo |
| "Where They At" (featuring Master P) | 2001 | — | — | — | Lil' Romeo |
| "Little Star" (featuring Allusion) | 2001 | — | — | — | Lil' Romeo |
| "The Girlies" | 2001 | — | 62 | — | Lil' Romeo |
| "2-Way" (featuring Master P & Silkk the Shocker) | 2002 | — | 65 | — | Game Time |
| "True Love" (with Solange Knowles) | 2002 | — | 116 | — | Game Time and Solo Star |
| "Play Like Us" (featuring Tyrone & Lil' D) | 2003 | — | — | — | Game Time |
| "My Cinderella" | 2004 | — | — | — | Romeoland |
| "My Girlfriend" (featuring Intyana) | 2004 | — | — | — | Romeoland |
| "U Can't Shine Like Me" (featuring Young-V & C-Los) | 2006 | — | — | — | Lottery and God's Gift: Music from the Motion Picture |
| "Special Girl" (featuring Marques Houston) | 2007 | — | 58 | — | Get Low |
| "Get Low Wit It" (featuring Akon, Young-V & C-Los) | 2008 | — | — | — | Get Low Wit It (EP) and Get Low |
| "Till the Club Close" (featuring Ace B) | 2015 | — | — | — | Fighting Monsters |
| "Bent" (featuring Ace B & Silkk the Shocker) | 2015 | — | — | — | Fighting Monsters |
| "B, All, In'" (featuring Young Vee) | 2016 | — | — | — | Non-album singles |
| "Shoulder" (featuring DeCarlo & Ace B) | 2016 | — | — | — | Non-album singles |

=== Promotional singles ===
| Year | Title | Album |
|---|---|---|
| 2001 | "That's Kool" (Remix) (with Silkk the Shocker featuring Little D) | Lil' Romeo |
| 2006 | "Wont Stop, Cant Stop" | God's Gift: Music from the Motion Picture |
| 2009 | "Pullin Up" (featuring Bobby V) | God's Gift: Music from the Motion Picture and Get Low |
| 2009 | "She Likes Me" (featuring Colby O'Donis) | Get Low |
| 2010 | "Famous Girl" (featuring Sean Kingston & Black Don) | Famous Girl (EP) |
| 2010 | "Tell You a Million Times" (featuring Tempo) | Non-album singles |
| 2010 | "Ice Cream Man Jr." (featuring Valentino & Black Don) | Non-album singles |
| 2010 | "They Don't Know" | Non-album singles |
| 2010 | "You" (featuring D'anna & Lil Twist) | Non-album singles |
| 2010 | "She Bad" (featuring Black Don & Lil' D) | Non-album singles |
| 2011 | "Famous Girl" (Remix) (featuring Sean Kingston & Black Don) | Non-album singles |

=== As featured artist ===
List of singles as featured artist, with selected chart positions and certifications, showing year released and album name
| Title | Year | Peak chart positions | | Album |
| Title | Year | US | US R&B | Album |
|---|---|---|---|---|
| "Tell Me a Story (About the Night Before)" (Hilary Duff featuring Lil' Romeo) | 2002 | — | — | Santa Claus Lane |
| "Hush Lil' Lady" (Lil' Corey featuring Lil' Romeo & Lil' Reema) | 2002 | 63 | 37 | I'm Just Corey |
| "Tight Whips" (504 Boyz featuring Slay Sean, 5th Ward Weebie, Lil' Romeo, Little D & Papa Reu) | 2002 | — | 51 | Ballers |
| "I Need Dubs" (Master P featuring Lil' Romeo) | 2005 | — | — | Ghetto Bill |
| "I Need an Armored Truck" (Master P featuring Romeo) | 2013 | — | — | The Gift |

=== Collaboration singles ===
List of collaboration singles, with selected details, showing year released and album name
| Title | Year | Album |
|---|---|---|
| "Parents Just Don't Understand" (with 3LW & Nick Cannon) | 2001 | Jimmy Neutron: Music from the Motion Picture |
| "Cutt" (with Rich Boyz) | 2005 | Young Ballers: The Hood Been Good to Us |
| "My Life" (with Master P as Miller Boyz featuring Miss Kitty & Playa) | 2006 | Hip Hop History |
| "Let the Kids Grow" (with Master P as Miller Boyz) | 2007 | Hip Hop History |
| "Side Kick" (with Master P as Miller Boyz featuring Playa) | 2007 | Hip Hop History |
| "I'm So Fly" (with Master P as Miller Boyz featuring Young-V) | 2008 | Hip Hop History |
| "Black History" (with Master P as Miller Boyz) | 2008 | Hip Hop History |
| "Foot Work" (with College Boyys) | 2009 | Spring Break |
| "Hold Me Down" (with College Boyys featuring D'Anna & Black Don) | 2010 | Spring Break |
| "Road to Riches" (with College Boyys featuring Tempo & Black Don) | 2010 | Spring Break |
| "The Only One" (with Resq3) | 2012 | Non-album single |

== Videography ==
=== Studio album music videos ===
| Year | Song | Album | Director |
|---|---|---|---|
| 2001 | "My Baby" | Lil' Romeo | Nick Quested, Master P |
| 2002 | "The Girlies" | Lil' Romeo | —N/a |
| 2002 | "2-Way" | Game Time | Nick Quested |
| 2003 | "True Love" | Game Time | —N/a |
| 2003 | "Play Like Us" | Game Time | —N/a |
| 2004 | "My Cinderalla" | Romeoland | Nick Cannon |
| 2004 | "My Girlfriend" | Romeoland | —N/a |
| 2006 | "U Can't Shine Like Me" | Lottery | Lucas Heyne, Master P |
| 2006 | "Shine" | Lottery | —N/a |

=== EPs/Mixtape music videos ===
| Year | Song | EP/Mixtape | Director |
|---|---|---|---|
| 2010 | "Practice" | Monster (featuring Tempo)/Practice | Andrew Sandler |
| 2011 | "How We Do" | Don't Push Me | Chaaz Williams |
| 2011 | "Scheduled Appointment" | I Am No Limit | Waymon Boone |
| 2012 | "Hug Me Forever" | Inception | Creative Dream Productions, Corey Cruz Molina |
| 2012 | "On a Bubble" | Inception | Creative Dream Productions, Corey Cruz Molina |

== Guest appearances ==
- 2002: Hilary Duff - "Tell Me a Story (About the Night Before)" (featuring Lil' Romeo)
- 2002: Lil' Corey - "Hush Lil' Lady" (featuring Lil' Romeo & Lil' Reema)
- 2002: 504 Boyz - "Tight Whips" (featuring Slay Sean, 5th Ward Weebie, Lil' Romeo, Little D & Papa Reu)
- 2005: Master P - "I Need Dubs" (featuring Romeo)
- 2006: Bengie B - "Everyday Im Shinin" (featuring Gangsta, C-Los & Romeo)
- 2006: C-Los - "If" (featuring Romeo)
- 2008: Colby O'Donis - "Take You Away" (featuring Romeo)
- 2010: K. Smith - "Runaway" (featuring Romeo & Black Don)
- 2010: K. Smith - "Money Flow" (featuring Black Don, Six & Romeo)
- 2011: Master P as Monstahh - "Meagon Good" (featuring Bengie B, Valentino & Romeo)
- 2011: Master P as Monstahh - "Trending" (featuring Gucci Mane & Romeo)
- 2011: Ay - "Speak With Ya Body" (featuring Lamiya & Romeo)
- 2011: Master P - "TMZ (Too Many Zeroes)" (featuring Romeo, Bengie B, T.E.C. & Miss Chee)
- 2011: Master P - "I Can Smell The Money" (featuring T.E.C., Eastwood, G5-J, Romeo, Bengie B & Miss Chee)
- 2012: Cymphonique - "All That" (featuring Romeo & P-Nut)
- 2013: Master P - "I Need An Armored Truck" (featuring Rome)
- 2013: Master P - "Makes You Stronger" (featuring Rome, Dee-1 & Silkk The Shocker)
- 2013: Master P - "Next Shooting Star" (featuring Rome & Dee-1)
- 2013: Master P - "Ghost" (featuring Rome)
- 2014: Master P - "Real From Day One" (featuring Maserati Rome & Silkk The Shocker)
