= Lil' Romeo (album) =

Studio album by Lil' Romeo
- Released: July 3, 2001
- Recorded: 2000–2001
- Genres: Hip hop; pop rap
- Length: 59:23
- Labels: No Limit; Soulja; Priority
- Producers: Master P (exec.); Carlos Stephens (exec.); Sean "Barney" Thomas

Lil' Romeo chronology
Lil' Romeo (2001)	Game Time (2002)

Singles from Lil' Romeo
- 1. "My Baby" Released: April 13, 2001; 2. "That's Cool (remix)" Released: November 4, 2001; 3. "The Girlies" Released: February 20, 2002

Lil' Romeo is the debut studio album by American rapper, Lil' Romeo. It was released July 3, 2001, by No Limit Records, Soulja Music and Priority Records. The album has features production by Master P, Carlos Stephens and Sean "Barney" Thomas; the album also has guest appearances by Silkk the Shocker, Lil' Zane, Little D, Allusion, Afficial, 6 Piece and Freequan.

The album garnered mixed reviews from music critics. It spawned the singles "My Baby" and "The Girlies". The album debuted at number 6 on the Billboard 200 and was certified Gold the next year. It was the last No Limit album to be distributed through Priority.

== Reception ==
=== Critical reception ===
Professional ratings
Review scores
Source	Rating
AllMusic	3.5/5 stars
Robert Christgau	(2-star Honorable Mention)
HipHopDX	2/5 stars
Rolling Stone	2.5/5 stars

Lil' Romeo received a mixed reception from music critics. AllMusic editor Jason Birchmeier praised the album for its "great pop-rap productions" and credited Master P for providing hooks that grabbed your attention. Music critic Robert Christgau gave the album a two-star honorable mention, indicating a "likable effort consumers attuned to its overriding aesthetic or individual vision may well enjoy." He highlighted "My Baby" and "Where They At" as "gangsta pop at its funniest, sickest, and safest." Kathryn McGuire of Rolling Stone commented on how the album was like a creation that Master P made in between his various business projects. An editor from HipHopDX criticized the album for its repetitive material in the songs and Romeo's flow for being "lackluster and underdeveloped."

=== Commercial performance ===
The album peaked at number 6 on the Billboard 200 and number 5 on the Top R&B/Hip-Hop Albums, selling 200,000 copies in its first week and spawned the hit single "My Baby", which reached number 3 on the Billboard Hot 100 and number one on the Hot R&B/Hip-Hop Songs music charts. The album was certified Gold by the RIAA for selling over 500,000 copies in the United States of America on July 5, 2001.

== Track listing ==
Lil' Romeo track listing
No.	Title	Writer(s)	Producer(s)	Length
1.	"Intro"	Lil' Romeo	Myke Diesel	0:38
2.	"Little Star" (featuring Allusion)	Lil' Romeo	Myke Diesel	4:00
3.	"My Baby"	Freddie Perren; Alphonzo Mizell; Berry Gordy; Dennis Lussier	Myke Diesel; Carlos Stephens; Master P	3:41
4.	"The Girlies"	Master P; Lil' Romeo; P.K.; Dwight Meyers; Marlon Williams; Joseph Modeliste; Leo Noeentelli; Arthur Neville; George Porter	Sean Barney Thomas	3:15
5.	"That's Kool" (remix featuring Silkk the Shocker & Lil' D)	Lil' Romeo; Silkk the Shocker; Lil D; Kurtis Walker; Darren Robinson; Damon Wimbley; Mark Morales	Myke Diesel	3:57
6.	"Somebody's in Love" (featuring Freequan)	Lil' Romeo	Myke Diesel	3:11
7.	"Make You Dance" (featuring Lil' Zane and Afficial)	Chip Taylor; Harry W. Casey; Richard Finch	Myke Diesel	3:55
8.	"My First" (remix featuring 6 Piece)	Master P; Lil' Romeo; Maurice Starr	Anthony President; Branz Dimilo	4:04
9.	"I Want to Be Like You"	Lil' Romeo; Master P	Myke Diesel	3:09
10.	"Little Souljas Need Love Too"	Lil' Romeo; Ricky Walters; Eric Sadler; James Boxley; Naheim Johnson; Martin Sunderland	Myke Diesel; Master P	3:14
11.	"Your ABC's"	Master P; Lil' Romeo	Myke Diesel; Carlos Stephens	2:36
12.	"When I Get Grown"	Lil' Romeo; Master P; P.K.; Gip Noble; Cecil Womack; Linda Womack; Ahmad Lewis; Stefan Gordy	Sean Barney Thomas	3:10
13.	"Remember"	Lil' Romeo	Myke Diesel	3:16
14.	"Where They At" (featuring Master P and Little D)	Master P; Lil' Romeo	Myke Diesel	3:19
15.	"Game" (featuring Afficial)	Lil' Romeo; Afficial	Carlos Stephens	3:30
16.	"Don't Want To"	Lil' Romeo	Myke Diesel	3:31
17.	"What" (featuring Master P and Slay Sean)	Lil' Romeo; Master P; Slay Sean; Eve Jeffer; Michael Gomez; Kasseem Dean	Myke Diesel	3:30
18.	"Take My Pain Away"	Lil' Romeo; Lil' Zane; Giorgio Moroder; Tom Whitlock	Carlos Stephens	3:29

Sample credits

- "My Baby" contains a sample of "I Want You Back" by The Jackson 5
- "The Girlies" contains a sample of "Girlz, They Love Me" by Marley Marl
- "That's Kool (Remix)" contains a sample of "Stick'em" by The Fat Boys
- "Make You Dance" contains samples of "Angel of the Morning" by Chip Taylor and "That's the Way (I Like It)" by KC and the Sunshine Band
- "Little Souljas Need Love Too" contains a sample of "Teenage Love" by Slick Rick
- "When I Get Grown" contains samples of "Love T.K.O." by Teddy Pendergrass and "Back in the Day" by Ahmad
- "What" contains a sample of "What Y'all Want (Remix)" by Eve
- "Take My Pain Away" contains a sample of "Take My Breath Away" by Berlin

== Personnel ==
Adapted from the Lil' Romeo liner notes.

- Colin Jahn – art direction
- Giulio Costanzo – additional graphic design
- Tim Alexander and Leslie Henderson – photography
- Bernie Grundman – mastering
- Howard DeLoach – project coordinator
- Music Resources – sample clearance

== Charts ==
=== Weekly charts ===
Chart (2001)	Peak position
Canadian R&B Albums (Nielsen SoundScan)	34
US Billboard 200	6
US Top R&B/Hip-Hop Albums (Billboard)	5

=== Year-end charts ===
Chart (2001)	Position
Canadian R&B Albums (Nielsen SoundScan)	177
Canadian Rap Albums (Nielsen SoundScan)	91
US Billboard 200	147
US Top R&B/Hip-Hop Albums (Billboard)	81

== Certifications ==
Region	Certification	Certified units/sales
United States (RIAA)	Gold	500,000^{^}
^{^} Shipments figures based on certification alone.
