= Radio M.U.S.C. Man =

Studio album by Womack & Womack
- Released: 1985
- Genres: Soul, pop
- Label: Elektra

Womack & Womack chronology
Love Wars (1983)	Radio M.U.S.C. Man (1985)	Starbright (1986)

Radio M.U.S.C. Man is an album by the American soul duo Womack & Womack, released in 1985. The pair were dropped by Elektra Records shortly after the release of the album.

The album peaked at No. 56 on the UK Albums Chart.

== Production ==
The album contains a cover of George Harrison's "Here Comes the Sun". The composition of the album's sixth track, "Love's Calling", was started by the soul singer Sam Cooke (the father of Linda Womack). Many members of the Womack family contributed to the making of Radio M.U.S.C. Man.

== Critical reception ==
Professional ratings
Review scores
Source	Rating
AllMusic	3/5 stars
Robert Christgau	B+
The Encyclopedia of Popular Music	3/5 stars
The Philadelphia Inquirer	4/4 stars
The Rolling Stone Album Guide	3/5 stars

Robert Christgau praised the "relaxed groove and wavering back-porch harmonies that go into their unique sound—lazy, tender, patient, long-suffering, tired of fighting." Billboard wrote that the album "showcased this couple's extraordinary writing skills and enticing vocal interplay." The Gazette called the album "brave and beautiful," writing that the duo "make the sweetest music in the whole world, propelled by effortless, hip-deep dance grooves, ballads to swoon over, and vocals—duets!—that make you wonder how this wonderful music ever went out of style."

The Philadelphia Inquirer deemed it "excellent," praising how "Linda's smokily ethereal tenor rubs against the rough edges of Cecil's craggy baritone." The Washington Post wrote that the Womacks "[tear] apart all the conflicts, temptations, betrayals and insecurities of marriage, swapping lines, verses and songs, always espousing two clear points of view in danceable, classic soul style."

NME listed Radio M.U.S.C. Man as the 34th best album of 1985.

== Track listing ==
No.	Title	Length
1.	"No Relief"	4:27
2.	"Maze"	5:52
3.	"Night Rider"	4:58
4.	"Eyes"	4:13
5.	"Radio M.U.S.C. Man"	4:10
6.	"Love's Calling"	5:48
7.	"Strange and Funny"	4:30
8.	"Romeo & Juliet (Where Are You?)"	5:37
9.	"Here Comes the Sun"	3:06

== Personnel ==
- Cecil Womack – vocals
- Linda Womack – vocals
