= King Kunta =

2015 single by Kendrick Lamar

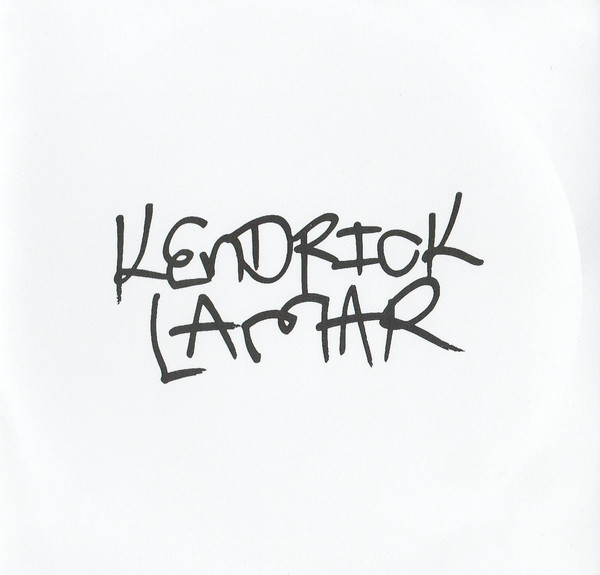

Single by Kendrick Lamar

from the album To Pimp a Butterfly
- Released: March 24, 2015
- Recorded: 2013–2014
- Genre: G-funk
- Length: 3:54
- Label: TDE; Aftermath; Interscope
- Songwriters: Stephen Bruner; Johnny Burns; Kendrick Duckworth; Stefan Gordy; Michael Jackson; James Brown; David Blake; Fred Wesley; John Starks; Ahmad Lewis
- Producers: Terrace Martin; Michael Kuhle; Sounwave

Kendrick Lamar singles chronology
"The Blacker the Berry" (2015)	"King Kunta" (2015)	"Bad Blood" (2015)

Music video
- "King Kunta" on YouTube

"King Kunta" is a song by American hip-hop recording artist Kendrick Lamar, from his third album, To Pimp a Butterfly (2015). It was released as the album's third single on March 24, 2015. Lamar co-wrote the song with Thundercat, while Terrace Martin, Michael Kuhle, and Sounwave served as producers. The song features interpolations and references to lyrics written by Michael Jackson, James Brown, Fred Wesley, John Starks, Ahmad, Redfoo, and Johnny Burns, who are all credited as songwriters.

== Writing and composition ==
"King Kunta" is a reference to the archetypal rebellious slave Kunta Kinte, the basis of the main character from the Alex Haley novel, Roots: The Saga of an American Family. The song also contains references to Chinua Achebe's novel Things Fall Apart and Ralph Ellison's novel Invisible Man. The song contains an interpolation of "Get Nekkid" (2000), written by Johnny Burns (a.k.a. Mausberg), performed by Mausberg, and produced by DJ Quik; resung lyrics from "Smooth Criminal" (1987), written and performed by Michael Jackson; elements of the 1974 James Brown song "The Payback", written by Brown, Fred Wesley, and John Starks; and a sample from the 1994 song "We Want the Funk", written and performed by Ahmad Lewis. Background vocals are provided by Whitney Alford.

== Critical reception ==
"King Kunta" was met with critical acclaim for its production and lyricism. This led to it being placed at number seven on Rolling Stone's "50 Best Songs of 2015" list, with the editors commenting, "The fiercest and most funkadelic track on To Pimp a Butterfly takes aim at everything from Lamar's haters to "the power that be." We already knew Kendrick was a great lyricist; turns out he's kind of a badass, too." Additionally, Pitchfork ranked the song at number four on its "The 100 Best Tracks of 2015" list. Village Voice named "King Kunta" the second-best single released in 2015 on their annual year-end critics' poll, Pazz & Jop. It came in 2nd on the annual Triple J Hottest 100 for 2015.

== Music video ==
The song's music video was directed by Director X and filmed in Compton, California. Lamar stated in an interview with New York City radio station Hot 97 that the majority of the people in the video are friends of his who still reside in Compton. It was inspired by the video for Dr. Dre's "Still D.R.E.", and also makes reference to the video for "California Love" by 2Pac. The video premiered on Vevo and YouTube on April 1, 2015.

== Live performances ==
Lamar has performed "King Kunta" on The Damn Tour, as well as on The Big Steppers Tour. He most recently performed it on The Grand National Tour.

== Charts ==
=== Weekly charts ===
Chart (2015–16)	Peak position
Australia (ARIA)	32
Belgium (Ultratop 50 Flanders)	15
Belgium Urban (Ultratop Flanders)	4
Belgium (Ultratip Bubbling Under Wallonia)	2
Canada Hot 100 (Billboard)	52
France (SNEP)	80
Ireland (IRMA)	47
Netherlands (Single Top 100)	70
New Zealand (Recorded Music NZ)	24
Sweden (Sverigetopplistan)	90
UK Singles (Official Charts)	56
US Billboard Hot 100	58
US Hot R&B/Hip-Hop Songs (Billboard)	20
US Hot Rap Songs (Billboard)	11
US Rhythmic Airplay (Billboard)	22

=== Year-end charts ===
Chart (2015)	Position
Belgium (Ultratop Flanders)	61
France (SNEP)	187
Chart (2016)	Position
Australia Urban (ARIA)	23

== Certifications ==
Region	Certification	Certified units/sales
Australia (ARIA)	7× Platinum	490,000^{‡}
Belgium (BRMA)	Gold	10,000^{‡}
Brazil (Pro-Música Brasil)	Gold	30,000^{‡}
Canada (Music Canada)	4× Platinum	320,000^{‡}
Denmark (IFPI Danmark)	Platinum	90,000^{‡}
New Zealand (RMNZ)	5× Platinum	150,000^{‡}
United Kingdom (BPI)	Platinum	600,000^{‡}
United States (RIAA)	Platinum	1,000,000^{‡}
^{‡} Sales+streaming figures based on certification alone.
