= Mind Magic =

Mind Magic can refer to:

- Mind Magic (album), an album by David Oliver
- Mind Magic (magazine), a 1931 American pulp magazine

== See also ==
- "Mind Is the Magic"
