= Death of Me =

Death of Me may refer to:

- Death of Me (EP), a 2026 extended play by Evan
- Death of Me (film), a 2020 horror film
- "Death of Me" (Red song), a 2008 song on Red's album Innocence & Instinct
- The Death of Me (Ahmad album), 2010
- The Death of Me, a 2020 album by Australian metalcore band Polaris
- The Death of Me (City and Colour EP), 2004
- "The Death of Me" (Asking Alexandria song), a 2013 song from Asking Alexandria's album From Death to Destiny
- "Death of Me", a 2026 song by Dean Brody from the album The Tenth Album (Side A)
