= Womack & Womack =

American musical duo

- Cecil & Linda Womack

Background information
- Also known as: The House of Zekkariyas
- Genres: R&B; soul; funk; dance
- Years active: 1983–2004
- Labels: Elektra; Manhattan; 4th & B'way; RCA; Warner Bros.; Spectrum; PolyGram; Z Life Grooves; S.A.R. Starship
- Past members: Cecil Womack; Linda Womack

Womack & Womack was the singing and songwriting partnership of married American musicians Linda Womack and Cecil Womack. The duo were successful as songwriters for other artists and had several international hits as a singing duo in the 1980s and 1990s. Later recordings with other members of their family were credited to The House of Zekkariyas.

== Background ==
Cecil Womack was born in 1947 in Cleveland, Ohio, and performed with his older brothers Bobby (1944–2014), Harry (1945–1974), Friendly, and Curtis (born Howard Curtis Womack on 22 October 1942, died 21 May 2017 in a Bluefield, West Virginia, hospital of respiratory heart failure), as a gospel group. After meeting Sam Cooke, they changed their name to the Valentinos and in 1961 began to sing and record "the devil's music" for secular audiences, to the horror of their religious father. The Valentinos had a hit record with "Lookin' for a Love", selling two million copies, later becoming a No. 39 U.S. hit for the J. Geils Band in 1971. They toured with James Brown and scored another crossover hit with "It's All Over Now", a song which subsequently reached No. 1 in the UK when covered by The Rolling Stones in 1964. But the fall-out from Cooke's death – he was shot by a motel manager in Los Angeles in December 1964 – and Bobby Womack's subsequent marriage to Cooke's widow months later halted their progress.

In the 1960s, Cecil Womack worked primarily as a songwriter and producer. He first met Linda, who is Sam Cooke's daughter, born in 1953, when he was thirteen and she was eight. Although Linda and Cecil were close, particularly after her father's death in 1964, he married singer Mary Wells in 1967 and wrote material for her, including the hit "The Doctor", released on Jubilee Records. They had three children, and he managed her career until their break-up in 1977. Linda Cooke also worked as a songwriter, co-writing Bobby Womack's "Woman's Gotta Have It." Bobby Womack was her stepfather, having married Sam Cooke's widow, Barbara. Bobby began a sexual relationship with Linda, which her mother discovered when Linda was 17.

Cecil Womack and Mary Wells divorced in 1977, and he and Linda married shortly afterwards, and had four more children together (three of whom have gone on to form "The Womack Sisters" vocal trio as of 2022).

== Performers ==
In 1983, Cecil and Linda began performing and recording together as Womack & Womack, and released a successful album, Love Wars, produced by Stewart Levine on Elektra Records. The first single from the album, "T.K.O.", reached the Billboard R&B chart; the next single, "Love Wars", reached no.14 on the UK singles chart in early 1984, and the third single from the album, "Baby I'm Scared of You", charted in both the US (no. 25, R&B chart) and the UK (no. 72). As with most of the tracks they recorded together, the songs were written by the pair. Their next album, the self-produced Radio M.U.S.C. Man, released in 1986, included songs which Sam Cooke had started to write and which Cecil and Linda completed, along with a cover of the Beatles' "Here Comes the Sun". The album only produced one hit, "Strange & Funny", the pair's last chart entry in the US, and they left Elektra to record for the Manhattan label. Their only release for the label, 1986's "Starbright," an ill-fated stab at the charts with little of their past sound, was barely released in the U.S., but produced a single, "Soul Love/Soul Man" that reached no. 58 in the U.K. Always popular in England, they headlined at the Royal Albert Hall in 1987.

Their success in the UK and other parts of the world was rekindled in 1988 with the "naggingly catchy" single "Teardrops", taken from their fourth album (and first for the Fourth & Broadway label), Conscience. The single reached no. 3 in the U.K., no. 1 in the Netherlands, Australia, and New Zealand; and no. 2 in Germany and Switzerland. Two other album tracks charted in England, "Life's Just a Ballgame" (U.K. no. 32) and "Celebrate the World" (U.K. no. 19). The album itself went gold in ten countries and platinum in three. An eleven-song VHS, Womack & Womack: Live in Concert was released in 1989, filmed during their "Celebrate the World" tour in Australia, America, England, Spain and France. It was re-released on DVD in 2009 by Cherry Red Films.

Their next album, 1991's Family Spirit, was released on RCA in the U.S., and BMG/Arista in the rest of the world. It didn't chart, but the single "Uptown" was a club and radio hit. After traveling to Nigeria, they discovered ancestral ties to the Zekkariyas tribe, and adopted African names. Now recording for Warner Bros. Records, in 1993 they released what was to be their last album of new material under the name of Womack & Womack, Transformation to the House of Zekkariyas. It produced their last charting single, "Secret Star," which reached no. 46 in the U.K. A compilation, Tear Drops: Greatest Hits, was released in 1993 in the U.K. on the Spectrum/PolyGram label and re-released on CD in 1998 as Greatest Hits. Rather than being career-spanning retrospectives, the compilations contain single/remix versions taken from the singles off Conscience, and live versions of "Love Wars," John Denver's "Take Me Home Country Roads," "Family" and "Rejoice", taken from the concert film. Strange & Funny (The Best of 1984-1993), an Australian compilation released on Raven Records, does a much better job at documenting the career of Womack & Womack - although all tracks are the album versions.

The Womacks, now using their adopted name, Zekkariyas, which they adopted while in Nigeria, and after claiming to have found a supposed Nigerian tribe of the same name, began recording as a family. Zek (Cecil) and Zeriiya (Linda), along with their children Zeumoja, Zeniya, Zeimani, and Zeapree, Lil Squal, and long-time backing group Sly, Slick & Wicked, released Sub Conscience aka Subconscience as ZEK in 2001 on their own Z Life Grooves label. ZEK is short for Zekkariyas Enlightenment Kingdom. Basically, a re-working of various tracks from throughout their career, a companion remix album, Circular Motion was released in 2004 on their S.A.R. Starship imprint, not 2007 as erroneously listed in many references. The original SAR Records was Sam Cooke's record label.

== Songwriters ==
Linda commenced a songwriting career in 1964 at the age of 11, composing "I Need A Woman", and would also co-write "I'm In Love" for Wilson Pickett and "A Woman's Gotta Have It" in 1972 for Bobby Womack. It was also recorded by James Taylor, along with many others. Cecil had also written numerous songs, sometimes collaborating with then wife Mary Wells. After beginning her personal and professional relationship with Cecil, the pair started their career working as a writing team for Philadelphia International Records. They composed tracks for artists such as Teddy Pendergrass, the Dramatics, the O'Jays ("I Just Want to Satisfy") and Patti LaBelle ("Love Bankrupt" and "Love Symphony"). Cecil's "Love TKO" (written with Gip Noble, Jr.) was a major hit for Teddy Pendergrass, and was later recorded by several artists, including Debbie Harry, Hall & Oates, Boz Scaggs and Michael McDonald.

On their own they hit a creative purple patch, composing material that went on to be recorded by George Benson ("New Day"), Randy Crawford (four tracks on her "Nightline" album), Eric Clapton ("Lead Me On") and "I Wish I Had Someone to Go Home To" for brother Bobby Womack. Bonnie Raitt covered "Good Man Monologue" as "Good Man, Good Woman" and Chaka Khan covered "It's My Party". The title track of their first album, "Love Wars," was covered by the Beautiful South for the 1990 Elektra Records anniversary compilation Rubáiyát, and "Teardrops" has been recorded by k.d. lang, Elton John, Joss Stone and The XX. The Womacks also wrote and produced for Culture Club and Bryan Ferry backup vocalist turned solo artist Ruby Turner. Her album Paradise featured their songs "Sexy" and "See Me," while they wrote and produced four cuts on her next album The Other Side.

== Discography ==
=== Albums ===
Year	Title	Peak chart positions			Certifications
Year	Title	US R&B	AUS	UK	Certifications
1983	Love Wars	34	—	45	
1985	Radio M.U.S.C. Man	51	—	56	
1986	Starbright	—	—	—	
1988	Conscience	74	11	4	BPI: Platinum
1991	Family Spirit	—	—	—	
1993	Transformation to the House of Zekkariyas	—	—	—	
1997	Timeless (as The House of Zekkariyas)	—	—	—	
2001	Sub Conscience (as ZEK)	—	—	—	
2004	Circular Motion (as ZEK / Womack & Womack Project)	—	—	—	
2006	Heritage I.D. (as The Greater House of Zekkariyas)	—	—	—	
"—" denotes releases that did not chart.

=== Compilations ===
- 1993: Tear Drops (Greatest Hits)
- 1998: Greatest Hits (CD version of Tear Drops)
- 2004: The Best of 1984-1993: Strange and Funny

=== Singles ===
Year	Single (A-side / B-side)	Chart positions										Certifications	Album
Year	Single (A-side / B-side)	US R&B	AUS	AUT	BEL	FRA	GER	IRE	NED	NZ	UK	Certifications	Album
1984	"T.K.O." / "Express Myself"	87	—	—	—	—	—	—	—	—	—		Love Wars
1984	"Love Wars" / "Good Times"	—	—	—	—	—	—	9	12	—	14		Love Wars
1984	"Baby I'm Scared of You" / "A.P.B."	25	—	—	—	—	—	—	—	—	72		Love Wars
1984	"Express Myself (Remix)" / "Woman"	—	—	—	—	—	—	—	—	—	—		Love Wars
1985	"Eyes" / "No Relief"	—	—	—	—	—	—	—	—	—	—		Radio M.U.S.I.C Man
1985	"Strange & Funny" / "Radio M.U.S.I.C. Man"	44	—	—	—	—	—	—	—	—	—		Radio M.U.S.I.C Man
1986	"Soul Love/Soul Man" / "Your Man's On Fire"	—	—	—	35	—	—	—	—	—	58		Starbright
1988	"Teardrops" / "Conscious of My Conscience"	—	2	4	1	4	2	4	1	1	3	BPI: Platinum; ARIA: Gold; RMNZ: 2× Platinum	Conscience
1988	"Life's Just a Ballgame" / "Slave (Just for Love)"	—	127	—	8	—	30	22	7	—	32		Conscience
1988	"Celebrate the World" / "Friends (So Called)"	—	37	15	12	24	22	18	24	9	19		Conscience
1988	"MPB (Missin' Persons Bureau)" / "MPB (Missin' Persons Bureau)" (Remix)	—	—	—	—	—	—	—	—	—	92		Conscience
1988	"Conscious of My Conscience" (U.S. promo)	—	—	—	—	—	—	—	—	—	—		Conscience
1989	"Good Man Monologue" (12")	—	—	—	—	—	—	—	—	—	—		Conscience
1990	"Uptown" / "Sanctification"	—	—	—	35	—	43	—	28	—	79		Family Spirit
1991	"My Dear (The Letter)" / "Keep On Climbing"	—	—	—	—	—	—	—	—	—	—		Family Spirit
1992	"Alimony" / "Get with the Band"	—	—	—	—	—	—	—	—	—	—		Non-album single
1993	"Passion and Pain" / "Understanding"; The House of Zekkariyas aka Womack and Womack	—	—	—	—	—	—	—	—	—	—		Transformation to the House of Zekkariyas
1994	"Secret Star"; The House of Zekkariyas aka Womack and Womack	—	—	—	—	—	—	—	—	—	46		Transformation to the House of Zekkariyas
1997	"Be Thankful (Happy Holiday)" / "Toys (Let's Be in Love)"; The House of Zekkariyas	—	—	—	—	—	—	—	—	—	—		Timeless
"—" denotes a recording that did not chart or was not released in that territory.
