= Ahmad (album) =

Studio album by Ahmad
- Released: May 24, 1994
- Recorded: 1993–1994
- Studio: Winsonic Process & Recording
- Genre: West Coast hip hop
- Length: 54:42
- Label: Giant; Reprise
- Producer: Ahmad; Brian C. Walls; Kendal; Maurice Thompson

Singles from Ahmad
- 1. "Back in the Day" Released: 1994; 2. "You Gotta Be" Released: August 30, 1994

Ahmad is the debut studio album by American rapper Ahmad. It was released on May 24, 1994, through Giant/Reprise Records. It was produced by Redfoo, Brian C. Walls, Maurice Thompson, and Ahmad, who also served as executive producer with Cassandra Mills and Lloyd Winston. The album produced two singles: "Back in the Day" and "You Gotta Be".

== Critical reception ==
Professional ratings
Review scores
Source	Rating
AllMusic	4/5 stars
Robert Christgau	A−
RapReviews	8.5/10

The Charlotte Observer likened Ahmad to "a young Heavy D."

== Track listing ==
No.	Title	Writer(s)	Producer(s)	Length
1.	"Freak"	Ahmad A. Lewis; Brian C. Walls	Brian C. Walls; Ahmad (co.)	5:06
2.	"Back in the Day"	Lewis; Stefan Kendal Gordy; Curtis Mayfield	Kendal; Ahmad (co.)	5:18
3.	"Touch the Ceiling"	Lewis; Gordy; Randy Muller; Lawrence Muggerud; Leor Dimant; Jason Vasquez	Kendal; Ahmad (co.)	3:54
4.	"The Jones'"	Lewis; Gordy	Kendal; Ahmad (co.)	4:24
5.	"Can I Party?"	Lewis; Maurice Thompson; Bernard G. Worrell; William Collins; George Clinton Jr.	Maurice Thompson; Ahmad (co.)	3:47
6.	"You Gotta Be..."	Lewis; Gordy; Eric Barrier; William Griffin	Kendal; Ahmad (co.)	4:26
7.	"We Want the Funk"	Lewis; Gordy	Kendal; Ahmad	4:52
8.	"The Palladium"	Lewis; Gordy	Kendal; Ahmad (co.)	4:49
9.	"Homeboys First"	Lewis; Gordy	Kendal; Ahmad (co.)	3:51
10.	"Ordinary People"	Lewis; Gordy; Joe Sample	Kendal; Ahmad (co.)	3:53
11.	"Back in the Day" (Remix)			5:07
12.	"Back in the Day" (Jeep Mix)			5:15
Total length:				54:42

Sample credits

- Track 2 contains a portion of the composition "Let's Do It Again" written by Curtis Mayfield.
- Track 3 contains samples from "Get Up to Get Down", written by Randy Muller, as performed by Brass Construction, and "The Funkiest", written by Lawrence Muggerud, Leor Dimant and Jason Vasquez, as performed by Funkdoobiest.
- Track 5 contains samples from "Let's Take It to the Stage" and "Flashlight" as performed by Parliament, and "The Humpty Dance" as performed by Digital Underground.
- Track 6 contains samples from "Paid in Full" as performed by Eric B. & Rakim.
- Track 10 contains samples from "Do You Remember When" as performed by the Crusaders.
- Tracks 11 and 12 contain samples from "Love T.K.O.", written by Cecil Womack, Linda Womack and Eddie "Gip" Noble, as performed by Teddy Pendergrass.

== Personnel ==
- Ahmad Lewis – vocals, producer (track 7), co-producer (tracks: 1–6, 8–10), re-mixing (tracks: 11, 12), arranger, executive producer, sleeve notes
- Brenda Lee Eager – backing vocals (tracks: 1, 4, 6, 7, 10)
- Cynthia Bass – backing vocals (tracks: 1, 4, 7)
- Della Miles – backing vocals (tracks: 1, 4, 7)
- Roger Troutman – backing vocals (tracks: 4, 7)
- David Elliot – backing vocals (track 10)
- Stan "The Guitar Man" Jones – guitar (tracks: 1, 2, 7, 10–12), bass (track 5)
- Michael Angelo Saulsberry – strings & horns (tracks: 11, 12)
- Brian C. Walls – producer (track 1)
- Stefan Kendal "Redfoo" Gordy – producer (tracks: 2–4, 6–10), sleeve notes
- Maurice Thompson – producer (track 5), re-mixing (tracks: 11, 12)
- Winston Johnson – recording (tracks: 1, 2, 4–8, 10), mixing (tracks: 1–10)
- Richard "Segal" Huredia – recording (tracks: 2, 3, 5, 9)
- Nazeeh Islam – recording assistant (tracks: 1–10)
- Brian "Big Bass" Gardner – mastering
- Cassandra Mills – executive producer
- Lloyd Winston – executive producer
- Gregory Gilmer – art direction
- Amy Guip – photography
- Dave Jacobson – A&R

== Charts ==
Chart (1994)	Peak position
US Top R&B Albums (Billboard)	48
US Heatseekers Albums (Billboard)	8
