= Jamerican Man =

Studio album by David Oliver
- Released: 1977
- Recorded: 1976–77
- Genre: Soul; Funk
- Label: Mercury Records
- Producer: Wayne Henderson

David Oliver chronology
Jamerican Man (1977)	Mind Magic (1978)

Jamerican Man is the debut album by vocalist David Oliver.

== Reception ==
Professional ratings
Review scores
Source	Rating
AllMusic	3/5 stars

Originally released in 1977 as Jamerican Man, later pressings were changed to the self-titled David Oliver. The album reached number eighteen on the Billboard Top Soul LPs chart. The single, "Ms.", peaked at number thirteen on the Soul Singles chart in 1978. The album also contained the original version of "Friends & Strangers" that Ronnie Laws recorded for his album of the same name in 1977.

== Track listing ==
1. What Kinda Woman - (Wayne Henderson, David Oliver) 4:59
2. Love So Strong - (David Oliver, Ruth Robinson) 3:31
3. Ms. - (David Oliver, Ruth Robinson) 5:20
4. Friends & Strangers - (David Oliver, Ruth Robinson, William Jeffreys) 4:59
5. Let's Make Happiness (David Oliver, Ruth Robinson, Wayne Henderson) 4:37
6. Munchies - (David Oliver, Lawrence Smith) 5:08
7. You And I - (Donny Beck) 5:00
8. Playin' At Bein' A Winner - (David Oliver, Ruth Robinson) 4:35

== Charts ==
Chart (1978)	Peak position
US Billboard Top LPs & Tape	128
US Billboard Top Soul LPs	18

=== Singles ===
Year	Single	Chart positions
Year	Single	US Soul
1978	"Ms."	13
