= Conscience (Womack & Womack album) =

Studio album by Womack & Womack
- Released: June 13, 1988
- Studio: Compass Point, Nassau, Bahamas
- Genre: R&B
- Length: 41:57
- Label: Island
- Producer: Chris Blackwell; Cecil Womack; Linda Womack

Womack & Womack chronology
Starbright (1986)	Conscience (1988)	Family Spirit (1991)

Professional ratings
Review scores
Source	Rating
AllMusic	3/5 stars

Conscience is the fourth album by Womack & Womack, released in 1988. It contains the hit single "Teardrops". The backing musicians were entitled the Mountain Man Band.

== Track listing ==
All tracks by Cecil Womack and Linda Womack (credited as Dr Rue and the Gypsy Wave Banner).

1. "Conscious of My Conscience" – 6:10
2. "MPB (Missin' Persons Bureau)" – 3:58
3. "Friends (So Called)" – 5:43
4. "Slave (Just for Love)" – 5:02
5. "Teardrops" – 5:04
6. "Good Man Monologue" – 4:31
7. "Life's Just a Ballgame" – 4:24
8. "I am Love" – 2:43
9. "Celebrate the World" – 4:14

== Personnel ==
=== Performance ===
- Joel Bryant – keyboards
- Ricky Fataar – drums
- Cecil Womack – vocals, background vocals, guitar, keyboards
- Earl "The Pearl" Womack – drums
- Linda Womack – vocals, background vocals, guitar, keyboards
- Naomi Womack – background vocals
- Travis B. Womack – bass guitar
- The Virginia Womack Family – background vocals
- Dashiell Rae – backing vocals
- Lyn Gerald – backing vocals

=== Production ===
- Chris Blackwell – producer
- Carol Friedman – art direction and photography
- Sue Keston – design
- Vince McCartney – engineer

== Charts ==
=== Weekly charts ===
Weekly chart performance for Conscience
Chart (1988)	Peak position
Australian Albums (ARIA)	11
Austrian Albums (Ö3 Austria)	8
Dutch Albums (Album Top 100)	49
German Albums (Offizielle Top 100)	5
New Zealand Albums (RMNZ)	10
Swedish Albums (Sverigetopplistan)	17
Swiss Albums (Schweizer Hitparade)	5
UK Albums (OCC)	4
US Top R&B/Hip-Hop Albums (Billboard)	74

=== Year-end charts ===
Year-end chart performance for Conscience
Chart (1989)	Position
German Albums (Offizielle Top 100)	35
New Zealand Albums (RMNZ)	37

== Sales and certifications ==
Certifications for Conscience
Region	Certification	Certified units/sales
France (SNEP)	Gold	100,000^{*}
Germany (BVMI)	Gold	250,000^{^}
Netherlands (NVPI)	Gold	50,000^{^}
Switzerland (IFPI Switzerland)	Gold	25,000^{^}
United Kingdom (BPI)	Platinum	300,000^{^}
^{*} Sales figures based on certification alone.^{^} Shipments figures based on certification alone.
