= Love T.K.O. =

1980 single by David Oliver

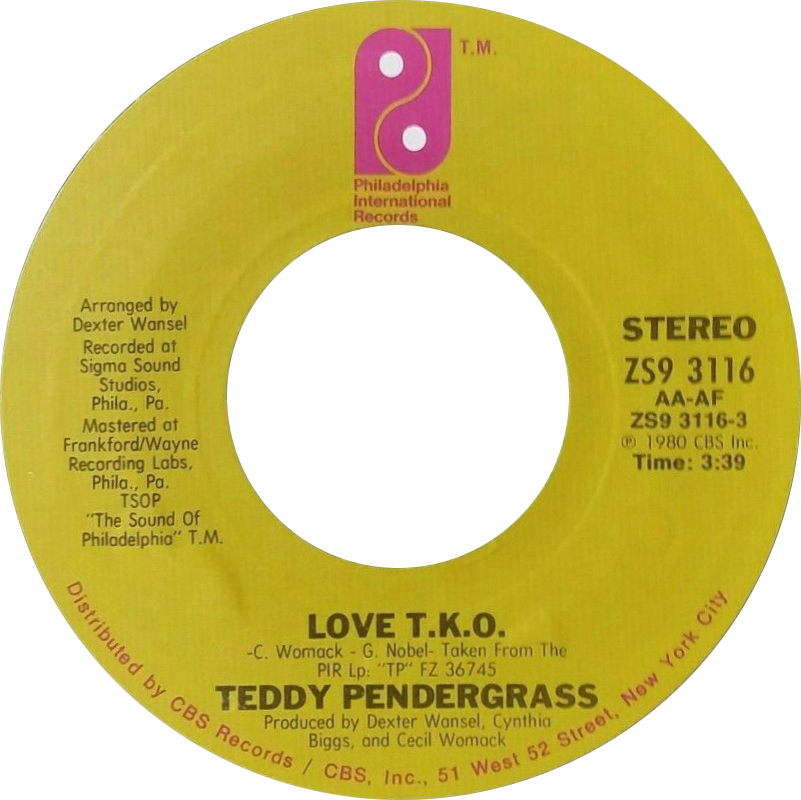
- Side A of the US single

Single by Teddy Pendergrass

from the album TP
- B-side: "I Just Called to Say"
- Released: November 1980
- Recorded: 1980
- Genre: Soul
- Length: 4:58; 3:39 (single version)
- Label: Philadelphia International Records
- Songwriters: Cecil Womack; Gip Noble, Jr.
- Producers: Dexter Wansel, Cecil Womack, Cynthia Biggs

Teddy Pendergrass singles chronology
| "Can't We Try" (1980) | "Love T.K.O." (1980) | "Two Hearts" (1981) |

"Love T.K.O."

Single by David Oliver

from the album Here's To You
- A-side: "My Lady"
- Released: 1980
- Recorded: 1980
- Genre: Soul
- Length: 4:36
- Label: Mercury (45-76067)
- Songwriters: Cecil Womack; Gip Noble, Jr.
- Producer: Wayne Henderson

David Oliver singles chronology
| "Summer Love" (1979) | "Love T.K.O." (1980) |

"Love T.K.O." is a song written by Cecil Womack and Gip Noble, Jr. Standing for technical knockout, it was written for soul singer David Oliver, and appeared first on his album Here's to You in 1980. Cecil and Linda Womack recorded the song themselves as Womack & Womack and it appeared simply as "T.K.O." on their debut album Love Wars in 1983.

== Teddy Pendergrass recording ==
"Love T.K.O." is mainly associated with R&B and soul artist Teddy Pendergrass, who recorded the song for his 1980 album TP, releasing it as a single the same year. Arranged by Dexter Wansel, it reached No. 2 on the Billboard R&B chart and No. 44 on the Billboard Hot 100.

== Charts ==
=== Teddy Pendergrass version ===
| Chart (1980) | Peak position |
|---|---|
| US Billboard R&B | 2 |
| US Billboard Hot 100 | 44 |

=== Regina Belle version ===
Regina Belle recorded and released her version in 1995 and included on her Reachin' Back LP.

| Chart (1995) | Peak position |
|---|---|
| US Billboard R&B | 29 |

== Other recordings ==
"Love TKO" has been covered by several artists, including:

- Deborah Harry
- Hall & Oates
- Bette Midler
- Boz Scaggs
- Lambchop
- Michael McDonald
- Seal
- Fourplay
- Womack & Womack (as just "T.K.O.") on their 1983 album Love Wars
- Modern Man (Pittsburgh R&B/dance/cover band)
- Tatsuro Yamashita on his 1999 album On the Street Corner 3

== Samples ==
- In 1994, American rapper Ahmad sampled it for his hit single “Back in the Day ”.
- In 1995, R&B group Xscape sampled it for their remix of "Who Can I Run To".
- In 1996, the song was sampled by Kenny Lattimore on "I Won't Let You Down".
- Total as well as featured in the 2015 motion picture Concussion.

== Popular culture ==
- In 2006, Pendergrass' version of the song was featured in the popular video game Grand Theft Auto: Vice City Stories on fictional radio station VCFL.
- It was used in 2005 video game Fahrenheit (a.k.a. Indigo Prophecy).
- DJ Spooky referenced the song in his essay titled "Groove Theory" in URB.
- Artist Ahmad Lewis used the melody for a remix of his 1994 song "Back in the Day" from his self-titled album Ahmad.
- In 2025, Pendergrass’ version was used in an Air Jordan commercial about Jalen Hurts after the Philadelphia Eagles’ victory in Super Bowl LIX.
