= The Death of Me (Ahmad album) =

Studio album by Ahmad
- Released: August 10, 2010
- Genre: Hip hop
- Length: 41:20
- Label: WeCLAP

Ahmad chronology
Ahmad (1994)	The Death of Me (2010)

Singles from The Death of Me
- 1. "Get Some Money & Go 2 Jail"

The Death of Me is the second solo album by West Coast hip hop artist Ahmad, following sixteen years after his debut.

== Critical reception ==
Professional ratings
Review scores
Source	Rating
DJ Booth	4/5 stars
HipHopDX	3.5/5 stars

Reviews of The Death of Me have been very favorable. Nathan S. of DJ Booth wrote "Ahmad’s rhyme skills are as sharp as ever, and perhaps more importantly his time with 4th Avenue Jones has allowed him to develop a style completely and absolutely his own." On the song Run Up on Me Tho, Kevin Gary of HipHopdx wrote that "Ahmad nevers switches up his flow, but it works very well." On the song Writtens, he writes "Ahmad is looking at the younger generation of emcees and finds them wanting." On the album's lead single Get Some Money and Go 2 Jail, DJ Booth wrote that "Ahmad follows closely with raspy-voiced rhymes delivered in the flowing, semi-melodic cadences, resulting in a track that’s not only impossible to keep from getting stuck in your head, but provides some aptly comic social commentary as well." One of the distinct comments made about the album was his voice change to a rapsy sounding voice, quote hiphopdx "his voice sounds blown out and raspy, and, occasionally, one worries he’s running short on air."

On the track I'ma Emcee, Nathan S. wrote "Ahmad not only doing the track’s name justice lyrically, but pulling double duty with some impressive vocals, once again praising his vocals." The track also explores his painful life experiences. On a serious track Like Hip-Hop DJ Booth wrote "ahmad creates a break-up song that covers his relationship with hip-hop and his woman." On the song Dang, Kevin Gary writes he sounds "nakedly emotional and honest." On the track Don’t Run…Again, DJBooth wrote that he "juxtaposes rapid-fire percussion and a single piano stroke melody for an exploration of scared love."

The overall consensus to the album was that he was back. Hiphopdx wrote "His mature, astute attitude is something other grown, intelligent Hip Hop fans can certainly appreciate". DJ Booth wrote "I can’t believe there’s another rapper in hip-hop history who’s gone so long between dope albums, which makes this more than an album, it makes it a living piece of hip-hop history."

== Track listing ==
1. Run up on me Tho (3:55)
2. Writtens (ft. Jurny BIG) (3:28)
3. Get Some Money & Go 2 Jail (ft. Crooked I) (3:22)
4. Don't Run? Trinity (ft. Gabrielle Galindo) (4:05)
5. Nig Can't Tell Me Nunt (4:11)
6. I'ma Emcee (3:56)
7. UPS (3:27)
8. We Doin It (ft. Mesh, Eligh, and Luckyiam) (3:51)
9. Like Hip-Hop (4:03)
10. TK (0:04)
11. Dang (3:11)
12. Don't Run? Again (ft. Nene White) (3:47)
