= Love Wars =

Studio album by Womack & Womack
- Released: 1983
- Recorded: 1983
- Studio: Ocean Way Recorders, Hollywood, California
- Genre: R&B
- Length: 41:57
- Label: Elektra
- Producer: Stewart Levine

Womack & Womack chronology
Love Wars (1983)	Radio M.U.S.C. Man (1985)

Music video
- HLove Wars • TopPop on YouTube

Professional ratings
Review scores
Source	Rating
AllMusic	4.5/5 stars
Robert Christgau	A−

Love Wars is the 1983 debut album by musical duo Womack & Womack. The album, described by Chris Rizik of SoulTracks as "a critical favorite", charted at number 34 on the Billboard Top Black Albums chart. In his review of the album, music critic Robert Christgau praised husband Cecil Womack and wife Linda Womack as "[a]ce singers and songwriters (as opposed to singer-songwriters)", noting that "their lyrics about loss and conflict are sharper than those about love and happiness".

Two singles from the album, "Love Wars" and "Baby I'm Scared of You", were hits in the UK, reaching number 14 and number 72 on the UK Singles Chart, respectively. The album was ranked number 4 among the "Albums of the Year" for 1984 by NME, and the single "Love Wars" was ranked as the year's number 1 song.

== Track listing ==
Except where otherwise noted, all tracks by Cecil Womack and Linda Womack.

1. "Love Wars" – 5:58
2. "Express Myself" – 4:52
3. "Baby I'm Scared of You" (Eddie Noble, Jr., C. Womack, L. Womack) – 5:38
4. "T.K.O." (Noble, C. Womack, L. Womack) – 4:14
5. "A.P.B." (C. Womack, Friendly Womack, L. Womack) – 5:31
6. "Catch and Don't Look Back" (C. Womack, L. Womack, Naomi Womack) – 5:26
7. "Woman" – 4:17
8. "Angie" (Mick Jagger, Keith Richards) – 2:55
9. "Good Times" – 3:06

== Personnel ==
=== Musicians ===
- Lenny Castro – percussion
- Paulinho Da Costa – percussion
- Nathan East – bass
- James Gadson – drums
- Abraham Laboriel – bass
- Neil Larsen – synthesizer, guitar, piano
- Denzil Miller – keyboard
- Eddie "Gip" Noble – synthesizer
- Bobby Womack – background vocals
- Cecil Womack – bass, guitar, vocals
- Curtis Womack – vocals, background vocals
- Friendly Womack, Jr. – background vocals
- Linda Womack – vocals, background vocals
- Naomi Womack – background vocals
- Noel "Stacy" Womack – background vocals
- Art Wood – electronic drums

=== Production ===
- Bob Defrin – art direction
- Mark Ettel – assistant engineer
- Bernie Grundman – mastering
- Michael Kennedy – photography
- Stewart Levine – producer
- Rik Pekkonen – engineer, mixing

== Charts ==
Album

Year	Country	Chart	Peak position	Citation
1984	UK	UK Official Album Chart	45	

Singles

Year	Country	Single	Chart	Peak position	Citation
1984	UK	"Love Wars"	UK Official Singles Chart	14	
1984	UK	"Baby I'm Scared of You"	UK Official Singles Chart	72	
