= Rain Fire =

Studio album by David Oliver
- Released: 1979
- Recorded: 1979
- Genre: Soul; Funk
- Label: Mercury Records
- Producer: Wayne Henderson

David Oliver chronology
Mind Magic (1978)	Rain Fire (1979)	Here's to You (1980)

Rain Fire is the third album by vocalist David Oliver.

== Track listing ==
1. Could It Be Love
2. Summer Love
3. Don't You Ever Be Lonely
4. I Keep Looking For A Better Way
5. Rusty O' Halo
6. Never Seen A Girl Like You
7. Puppets On A String
8. Private Tonight
9. I Remember You When
10. Spinnin' Round In Circles

== Charts ==
Chart (1979)	Peak position
US Billboard Top Soul LPs	52
