= Family Spirit =

Studio album by Womack & Womack
- Released: 1991
- Genre: Pop
- Label: RCA
- Producer: Womack & Womack (as Poetry in Motion)

Womack & Womack chronology
Conscience (1988)	Family Spirit (1991)	Transformation to the House of Zekkariyas (1993)

Family Spirit is an album by the American musical duo Womack & Womack, released in 1991. "Uptown" peaked at No. 79 on the UK Singles Chart. The album was a commercial disappointment.

== Production ==
Many members of the Womack family contributed to the making of Family Spirit. "Keep On Climbing" was inspired by the duo's gospel roots. Some songs address world issues and societal concerns, while others describe rural and urban living.

== Critical reception ==
Professional ratings
Review scores
Source	Rating
AllMusic	3/5 stars
The Buffalo News	4/5 stars
Robert Christgau	(neither)
Record Mirror	6/10
The Rolling Stone Album Guide	2/5 stars
Tulsa World	3/4 stars

The St. Petersburg Times wrote that "Cecil and Linda Womack do not play by any musical rules, especially the ones that say black musicians are supposed to work within certain styles." The New York Times concluded: "Linda and Cecil Womack probably don't think of themselves as pillars of the outsider-pop community. But that's what they are after seven years of crafting extraordinary love songs with singular grooves." The Washington Post opined that "the lyrics resemble the questioning, pondering tone of Marvin Gaye's What's Going On, and the music has a similar jazz-influenced, open sound."

The State determined that "the Womacks make a sort of garage funk with a message." The Buffalo News deemed the music a "sound that is both bluesy and earthy." The Tulsa World stated that the Womacks "explore loneliness and an almost desperate search for togetherness at a time when most pop songs dwell on sexual power games."

== Track listing ==
No.	Title	Length
1.	"Family Spirit"
2.	"Uptown"
3.	"Refusal"
4.	"Living in a Different World"
5.	"United in Paradise"
6.	"My Dear (The Letter)"
7.	"Blue Jean Baby"
8.	"Danceworld"
9.	"Keep On Climbing"
10.	"Lonely Island"
