= Romeo Miller =

American rapper, singer, and actor (born 1989)

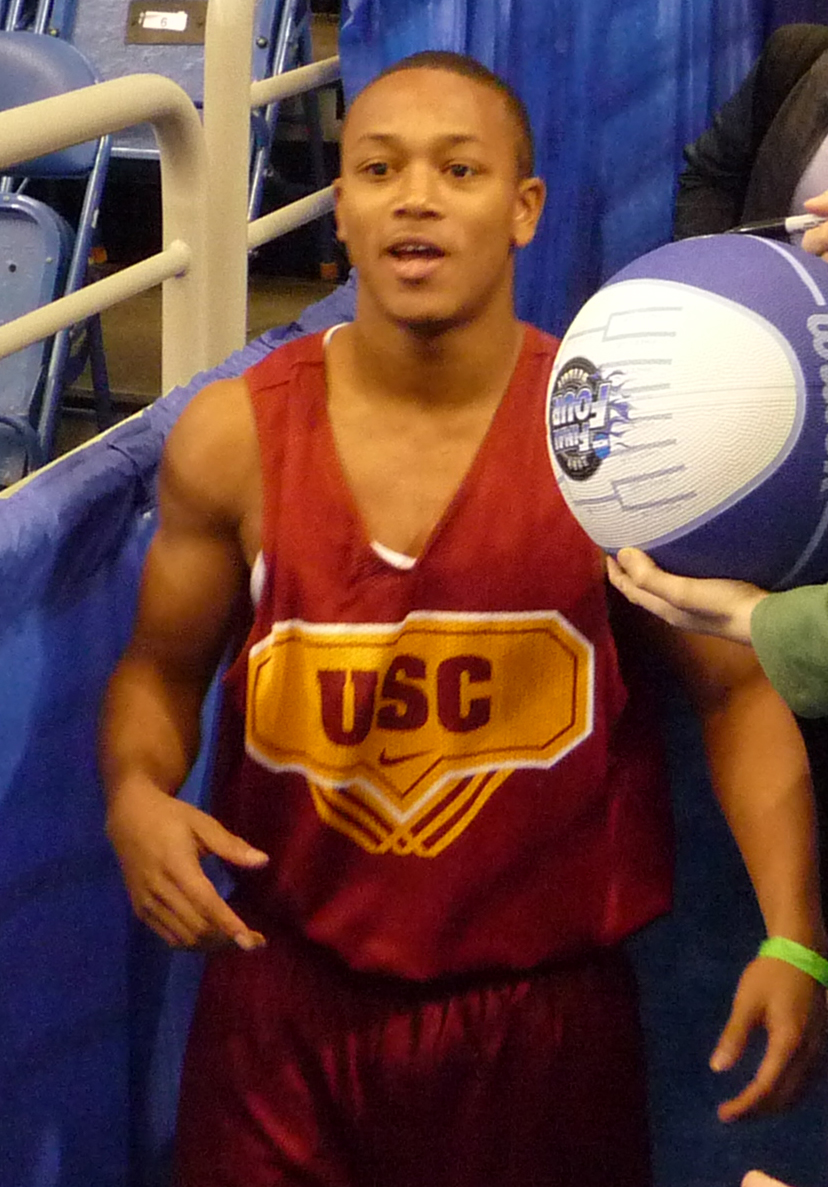
- Miller in 2009
- Born: Percy Romeo Miller; August 19, 1989 (age 37); New Orleans, Louisiana, U.S.
- Occupations: Rapper; singer; actor; television personality
- Children: 2
- Parents: Master P (father); Sonya C (mother)
- Relatives: Cymphonique Miller (half-sister); C-Murder (uncle); Silkk the Shocker (uncle); Mo B. Dick (cousin)
- Musical career
- Also known as: Lil' Romeo; Romeo; Rome; Percy Miller; Maserati Rome
- Genre: Hip hop
- Years active: 2000–present
- Labels: No Limit Forever; No Limit; Soulja Music; Priority; The New No Limit; Universal; E1; Guttar Music; UrbanDigital; GoDigital; Take A Stand; The Next Generation; LPD

Percy Romeo Miller (born August 19, 1989), also known by his stage name Romeo (formerly Lil' Romeo), is an American rapper, singer, actor and television personality. He gained fame as a rapper in the early 2000s after signing with his father, Master P's record label No Limit Records. His 2001 debut single, "My Baby" peaked at number three on the Billboard Hot 100 and preceded his debut studio album Lil' Romeo, which peaked at number six on the US Billboard 200.

In 2002, Miller released his second album Game Time, which charted at number 33 on the US Billboard 200. In 2004, Miller released his third album Romeoland, which charted at number 70, and in 2006, he released the digital album Lottery under the name Romeo. That same year, Miller released an accompanying soundtrack to his film God's Gift; his first explicit album. To date, it has sold over 300,000 units.

In 2007, Miller was offered and accepted a scholarship to play basketball for the USC Trojans, at the University of Southern California. He played basketball for the Trojans under his birth name, and played for the team until 2010. Aside from music, Miller has also worked as an actor and was given his own television series on Nickelodeon titled Romeo! in 2002, which ran for three seasons. Miller starred in the feature films Jumping the Broom (2011) and Tyler Perry's Madea's Witness Protection (2012). Miller founded the record labels Guttar Music, Take a Stand, The Next Generation and No Limit Forever Records in 2010.

== Early life ==
Miller was born in New Orleans, Louisiana. He is a son of rapper and entrepreneur Master P and former rapper Sonya C. He is a nephew of rappers C-Murder and Silkk the Shocker, cousin of producer, singer, and rapper Mo B. Dick, and half brother of singer and actress Cymphonique Miller. Romeo was signed to No Limit's subsidiary label Soulja Music Entertainment at the age of five, after he wrote a rap to his father.

== Music career ==
=== 2001: Lil' Romeo ===
As Lil' Romeo, his debut album was the self-titled Lil' Romeo. It contains the hit single "My Baby" that charted No. 1 for R&B/Hip-hop Singles. The album peaked at No. 6 on the Billboard 200 and No. 5 on the Top R&B/Hip-Hop Albums. On July 28, 2001, it was certified Gold by the RIAA for selling 500,000 copies in the United States. Also in 2001, he was featured on his uncle Silkk the Shocker's remix single of "That's Kool", which was also featured on his own album.

=== 2002–2003: Game Time ===
In 2002, a year later after his debut album, Miller put out his second studio album, Game Time. It peaked at No. 33 on the Billboard 200 and No. 10 on the Top R&B/Hip-Hop Albums. It spawned the Billboard-charting single "2-Way" that charted to No. 66 Hot R&B/Hip-Hop Songs. It also spawned a second single "True Love" which charted at No. 16 under the Hot R&B/Hip-Hop Songs.

=== 2004: Romeoland ===
In 2004, Miller released his third studio album Romeoland via The New No Limit and Koch, it would be Miller's last studio album to feature himself billed as Lil' Romeo; it was not as successful in sales. Romeoland charted at No. 70 on the Billboard 200 and at No. 29 on the Top Rap Albums chart.

=== 2005–2007: Collaborations, name change, Lottery and God's Gift soundtrack ===
In 2005, Miller, along with his father Master P, founded a new record label titled Guttar Music Entertainment. Also in 2005, Miller, along with his brother Valentino Miller and their three cousins C-Los, Lil' D and Willie J, formed the rap group Rich Boyz. They released their debut album titled Young Ballers: The Hood Been Good to Us via Guttar Music on November 22, 2005. The group later disbanded.

On April 4, 2006, Miller released his debut digital album Lottery via Guttar Music Entertainment, UrbanDigital and GoDigital Music Group, it was Miller's first album released with his official name changed to Romeo. On December 12, 2006, Miller released an album titled God's Gift via Guttar Music, UrbanDigital and GoDigital Music Group, it served as the soundtrack to the same name independent film Miller's father Master P had directed and produced, it was also Miller's first album to be classified as explicit. Both albums contained the song "U Can't Shine Like Me", which was a direct response to fellow rapper/actor Bow Wow, who fans believed dissed Miller and his father Master P in his song "Fresh Azimiz".

In 2007, Miller and his father Master P started a non-explicit record label titled Take A Stand Records. They also formed a new group called Miller Boyz. On September 4, 2007, they would release their debut album titled Hip Hop History via Take A Stand Records, UrbanDigital and GoDigital Music Group.

=== Since 2008: Mixtapes, EPs and collaborations ===
In 2008, Miller stated he was working on his fourth studio album titled Gumbo Station. On June 17, Miller released the first single from the album "Get Low Wit It", which featured Akon and his brother Valentino Miller, it failed to gain success on the Billboard charts.

On March 3, 2009, Miller released a compilation album titled Get Low that contained singles that were originally supposed to have been on Gumbo Station and also contained original songs from his previous albums. In late 2009, Miller formed a new record label titled The Next Generation Entertainment, the label at the time featured his group the College Boyys.

During this time, Romeo also confirmed that he was still working on his fourth studio album, but had changed the name of the album to The College Boy. Later, Romeo announced that the title of the album would be I Am No Limit. On January 19, 2010, Miller released a promotional single for the album titled "Tell Me a Million Times" featuring Tempo. On January 26, Miller released a second promotional single for the album titled "Ice Cream Man Jr." which was a tribute to his father. On February 16, Miller released his debut mixtape Patience Is A Virtue to promote the album. On March 2, Miller released two EPs to promote the album which were the Famous Girl and Monster/Practice via his label The Next Generation Entertainment and LPD Music. Also in 2010, Miller would introduce his new group the College Boyys; on May 25, 2010, they released their debut album titled Spring Break via his label The Next Generation Entertainment and Hollywood Dream Music, but the group would later disband for unknown reasons. Miller also on this day released three promotional singles which were "You" that featured his artist at the time D'Anna and Lil Twist, "She Bad" that featured his cousins/artists Lil' D and Black Don and "They Dont Know". Miller also performed at the 2010 Hip Hop Honors along with his brother Valentino Miller, his cousins Lil' D and Black Don, and his uncle Silkk The Shocker, along with Trina, Gucci Mane and Mystikal to honor Master P and No Limit Records. In late 2010, Miller relaunched No Limit Records as No Limit Forever. Romeo also confirmed that he had changed the name of his album from I Am No Limit to Intelligent Hoodlum.

In 2011, Miller toured with his father and Silkk the Shocker. The tour was titled "No Limit Forever International". On January 11, Miller released his EP Dont Push Me via his label The Next Generation Entertainment. On May 3, 2011, Miller released the first official single from Intelligent Hoodlum called "Famous Girl (Remix)" which was the mastered version of the original, it still featured the original appearances from Sean Kingston and Miller's cousin Black Don, but it would be later dubbed as a promotional single. On August 19, 2011, Miller released his I Am No Limit mixtape, which was originally supposed to be his fourth studio album, but Miller decided it would be best to just release it as a mixtape for his fans.

In 2012, Miller formed a new group called Resq3 which consisted of himself, drummer Christian Brock and guitarist/vocalist Myles Eberhardt. They released their first single "The Only One" and were scheduled to be releasing their debut album, touring and filming TV show later that year, but the group would disband for unknown reasons. The group's other releases consisted of songs such as "Right Along" and "No One Else Like You". On April 12, 2012, Miller released his first single from his upcoming fourth album titled "Hug Me Forever", which featured his brother Valentino. On May 19, 2012, Miller released the music video for "Hug Me Forever". On August 15, 2012, Miller announced that he had been working on a new mixtape titled Inception, it was released on August 19, 2012, under his new stage name Maserati Rome.

In 2013, Miller announced that he was working on a mixtape, When in Rome, slated for release in 2014. On January 5, 2015, Miller released his first collaboration mixtape titled We All We Got with his group Money Mafia that includes himself, his father, Ace B, Young Junne, Eastwood, Gangsta, Play Beezy, Calliope Popeye, Flight Boy and No Limit Forever in-house producer Blaq N Mild. The mixtape would also include a surprise feature from Lil Wayne on the track "Power". On April 20, Miller released his second collaboration mixtape titled Hustlin with his group Money Mafia. On July 29, 2015, Miller would release two new singles from his upcoming fourth studio album titled "Till the Club Close" featuring fellow No Limit Forever artist Ace B and "Bent" featuring fellow No Limit Forever artists Ace B and Silkk the Shocker. On December 17, Miller revealed the title, cover art and also announced the release date of his planned fourth studio album titled Fighting Monsters, which was set for release in January.

On January 7, 2016, Miller would release Fighting Monsters as a mixtape; it would feature guest appearances from Ace B, BlaqNmilD, DeCarlo, Eastwood, €$¢Ø, JSlugg500, his father Master P, Silkk the Shocker, and Travis Kr8ts. Fighting Monsters was originally supposed to be his fourth studio album, but Miller decided again it would be best to just release it as a mixtape for his fans. On January 13, Miller would release the mixtape for retail on iTunes for charity. On November 1, 2016, Miller released two singles from his planned fourth studio album titled "B, All, In" featuring fellow No Limit Forever artist Young Vee, and "Shoulder" featuring DeCarlo and fellow No Limit Forever artist Ace B. In December 2019, Miller released the album Hidden Treasure, featuring a collaboration with his father, Master P.

== Other ventures ==
=== Acting career ===
In 2001, Miller began his acting career with a cameo appearance in the Walt Disney Pictures' film Max Keeble's Big Move. In 2003, he co-starred with Jessica Alba, Mekhi Phifer, and Zachary Isaiah Williams in the dance film Honey. In this film, his supporting character was Benny, a young boy looking for a break. In 2003, he voiced himself in "Romeo in the Mix", an episode of the animated series Static Shock, and additionally performed the series' third theme song. He starred in another film with Zachary Isaiah Williams, God's Gift, which was released in 2006. He went on to co-star with his father in a film called Uncle P in 2007. His next project in 2007, was a film called ASL in which he starred as himself, alongside Forrest Lipton and Zachary Isaiah Williams who played the young Romeo; Williams had previously co-starred with Romeo in two films and Nickelodeon's Romeo!. Miller also made a cameo appearance in Ned's Declassified School Survival Guide as a rapping coach. He guest-starred as a rapper accused of murder in the 2010 CBS series The Defenders and acted in Jumping the Broom, released in May 2011. In 2011, he also starred in TV commercials for McDonald's and ICDC College. In 2012, Miller starred in Tyler Perry's film "Madea's Witness Protection". He played as Jake, a young man who is trying to get his money back from a ponzi scheme for his father's church and his retirement. In 2012, he participated in Fox's dating game show The Choice. He was a special guest star on the Nick News with Linda Ellerbee episode If Only I Were An Only Child: The Top 10 Annoying Things My Siblings Do which aired on Nickelodeon on May 13, 2013, on which Romeo (among others) talked about annoying things his siblings did, one of which was his brother taking shoes that Romeo was planning to wear, so he could show them to a girl he liked.

From 2013 to 2014, Miller appeared in additional advertisements for ICDC College. He was cast in the 2017 feature film Never Heard, also starring his father, Master P. In February 2022, it was announced Miller had landed a role in the Lifetime film Wrath: A Seven Deadly Sins Story, which aired on April 16. In December 2022, he starred in the holiday themed BET+ film, A Miracle Before Christmas.

=== Fashion designer ===
On July 24, 2010, Romeo launched his own clothing line titled "College Boyys". The brand has been promoted by Miller, his group the College Boyys, and also artists such as Justin Bieber, Big Time Rush, and Jaden Smith. Romeo stated:

When I was a kid, I used to lick markers on my t-shirt "I'm going to college" and that imprint stuck in my head and made a difference to me in my life, turning it into a reality. I want to implant the same positive message to young boys as they dress themselves each day with a feeling of success. They can look in the mirror at themselves with a positive goal in mind for their bright future knowing that going to college can make a big difference in their lives. College Boyys clothing style is classy, cool, and urban with a message: "It's actually cool to be smart."

On November 13, 2013, Miller revealed that he was working on a brand new clothing line titled ROME Everything.

=== Basketball career ===
Percy Miller
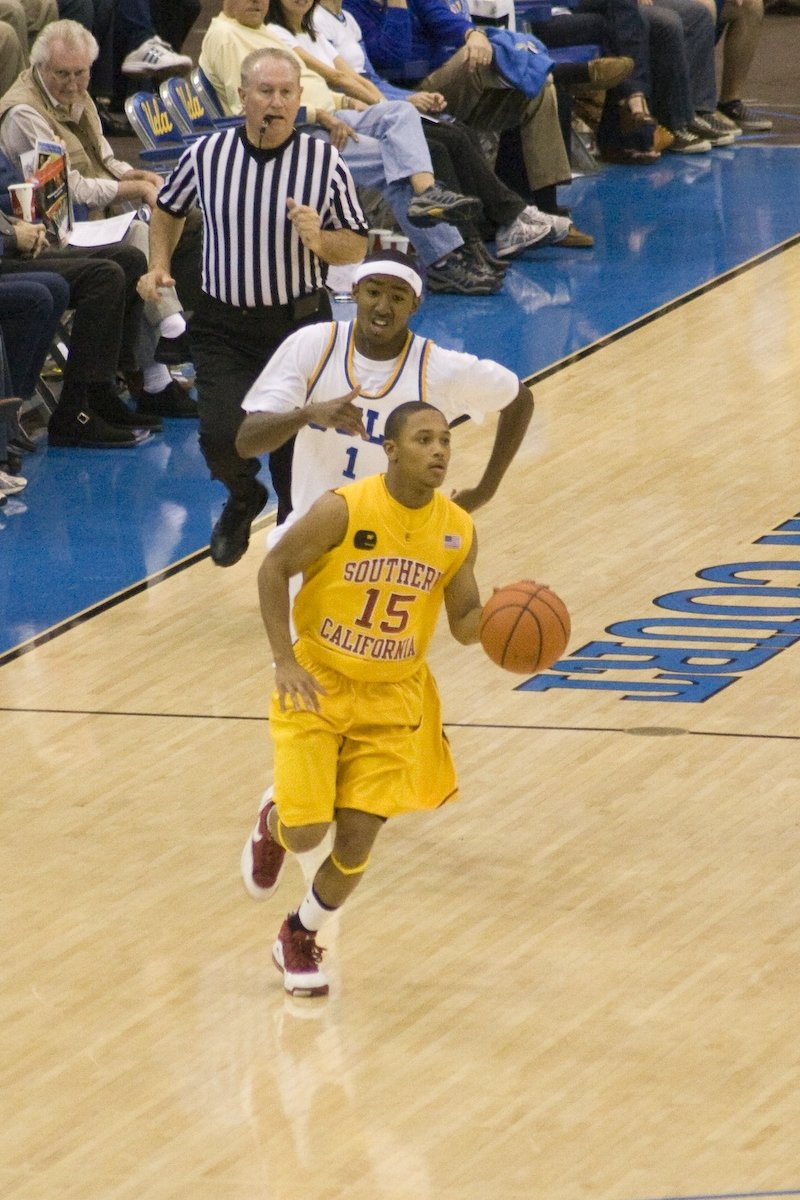
- Miller (front) in February 2009

Personal information
- Listed height: 5 ft 11 in (1.80 m)
- Listed weight: 170 lb (77 kg)

Career information
- High school: Beverly Hills High School
- College: USC
- Playing career: 2008–2010
- Position: Point guard
- Number: 15

Miller played basketball as a point guard for one year at Windward High School before he transferred and became a three-year starter at Beverly Hills High School. As a junior, during the 2005–06 high school season, he averaged 13.9 points and 5.6 assists per game. As a senior, during the 2006–07 high school season, he averaged 8.6 points and 9.0 assists per game.

In the summer of 2006, Miller was invited to the Reebok-sponsored ABCD Camp, a basketball camp in the US. The Teaneck, New Jersey–based camp, an invitation-only basketball showcase, was previously attended by high-profile National Basketball Association (NBA) players including Kobe Bryant, Stephon Marbury, Tracy McGrady, LeBron James, and Carmelo Anthony. Surrounded by future NBA players such as O. J. Mayo, Derrick Rose, and Kevin Love, Miller averaged less than 2 points a game and struggled throughout the camp. Sonny Vaccaro, the longtime director of the ABCD Camp, explained that he invited Miller to the 2006 camp, "primarily as a favor to Percy Miller (Romeo's father Master P), whom he knew from the club basketball circuit." Vaccaro also said, "If you're looking for the profile of an athlete who plays basketball at USC, he's not it."

Despite this, on April 13, 2007, Miller verbally committed to the University of Southern California (USC) and signed a letter of intent on November 19. According to The Wall Street Journal, the decision to grant Miller a full scholarship at USC was largely driven by his relationship with friend and teammate DeMar DeRozan, an All-American forward who was rated as the number five prospect in the country on Scout.com, and his father's influence. The Wall Street Journal reported Coach Tim Floyd as saying, "Last April ... Percy Miller called while driving both players from a tournament in Fayetteville, Ark ... Percy Miller said 'Demar and Romeo are ready to make their decision, and would you like to have them both on scholarship?' ... 'I said absolutely.'"

Miller and DeRozan began playing for USC in the 2008–09 season. Miller used his given first name, Percy, when playing for the Trojans. He only played for the Trojans for two seasons, and was released after the 2009–10 season. He played a total of 19 minutes in nine games, scoring five points and recording three rebounds and one assist.

=== Modeling career ===
On December 27, 2010, Romeo modeled for a new 2011 calendar. On April 10, 2011, Miller modeled for the April issue of TROIX magazine. On April 12, Miller modeled in a new photoshoot.

=== Dancing with the Stars ===
After originally withdrawing from season two of Dancing with the Stars due to an injury, Romeo competed in season twelve. He was partnered with professional dancer, Chelsie Hightower. They were eliminated from the show on May 10, 2011, and finished in the Top 5, one week before the semi-final.

Week #	Dance/Song	Judges' score			Result
Week #	Dance/Song	Inaba	Goodman	Tonioli	Result
1	Cha-Cha-Cha/ "Romeo"	7	6	6	No Elimination
2	Quickstep/ "You're the One That I Want"	7	8	8	Safe
3	Rumba/ "I'll Be There"	7	6	7	Safe
4	Paso Doble/ "Palladio, First Movement"	7	8	8	Safe
5	Foxtrot/ "New York, New York"	9	8	9	Safe
6	Waltz/ "My Heart Will Go On"	10	9	9	Safe
7	Cha-Cha-Cha/ ""Born This Way""; Samba/ "Say Hey (I Love You)"	8*/8; 7*/8	7; 7	7; 8	Safe
8	Tango/"Hold It Against Me"; Salsa/"Tequila"	9; 8	9; 9	9; 8	Eliminated

- In week 7, Donnie Burns was the guest judge and scored the dances.

=== Other media ===
On November 21, 2017, Miller competed on the Champs vs. Stars special of the MTV reality series The Challenge. He also hosted MTV's Ex on the Beach for four seasons.

In 2026, Miller also competed on season 30 of Worst Cooks in America, and was eliminated in the first episode.

== Personal life ==
On February 14, 2022, Miller took to Instagram to announce the birth of his first child, a daughter, with girlfriend, Drew Sangster. On March 15, 2023, Miller announced on Instagram that he had welcomed another daughter, his second child with Sangster. Miller is Catholic.

== Discography ==
- Lil' Romeo (2001)
- Game Time (2002)
- Romeoland (2004)
- Lottery (2006)
- Hidden Treasure (2019)
- New Lane (2026)

== Filmography ==
=== Film ===
Year	Title	Role	Notes
2001	Max Keeble's Big Move	Himself	
2003	Honey	Benny	
2004	Still 'Bout It	M.J.	Direct-to-video film
2004	Decisions	Tyrone Big Nig	Direct-to-video film
2005	Uncle P	Corey Miller	
2006	God's Gift	Romeo	
2006	Don't Be Scared	Stevie	Direct-to-video film
2007	Crush On U	Romeo	Direct-to-video film
2007	Black Supaman	Lional	Direct-to-video film
2010	Down and Distance	Darren Sheehan	
2011	Jumping the Broom	Sebastian	
2012	Madea's Witness Protection	Jake	
2013	Frog Kingdom	Foofie	Voice only
2013	Frat Brothers	Derrick Shaw	
2014	Could This Be Love	Damon	
2015	Megachurch Murder	Oliver King	
2015	Brotherly Love	Sean	
2015	A Girl Like Grace	Jason	
2015	I Think My Babysitter's an Allen	Agent David	
2016	Little Dead Rotting Hood	Danny	
2016	Jarhead 3: The Siege	Sunshine	Direct-to-video film
2017	Game Day	Lucas	
2017	Dead Trigger	Gerald 'G-Dog' Jefferson	
2017	Destruction: Los Angeles	Marcus Taylor-Jones	
2018	American Fright Fest	Rico	
2018	Adolescence	Keith	
2018	Never Heard	Jalen	
2019	I Got the Hook Up 2	Johnny Miller	
2021	Who is Christmas Eve?	Chris	
2021	The Pig People	TJ	
2022	A Miracle Before Christmas	Matthew Wright	
2023	Christmas Angel	EJ	
2023	Clown Motel	Louis	
2023	Secret Society 3: 'Till Death	Ryan	
2024	Brewster's Millions: Christmas	Andrew	
2025	One Heart	Shade	

=== Television ===
Year	Title	Role	Notes
2001	Oh, Drama!	Himself	Musical guest; episode: Nov 1, 2001
2001	The Hughleys	Himself	Episode: "Daddy's Lil' Girl"
2001–2004	Hollywood Squares	Himself	Recurring panelist
2002	Raising Dad	Marvin	Episode: "Bully"
2002	The Nick Cannon Show	Himself	Episode #2.1
2002	Taina	Himself	Episode: "Beyond The Music"
2002	The Proud Family	Himself	Voice, episode: "A Hero for Halloween"
2003	One on One	Eric	Episode: "Spy Games"
2003	Star Search	Himself	Guest judge; episode: "The One with the Father and Son Duo Master P and Lil' Romeo"
2003	Soul Train	Himself	Episode: "Dru Hill/Lil' Romeo/Needa S."
2003	Static Shock	Himself	Voice, episode: "Romeo in the Mix"
2003–2006	Romeo!	Romeo "Ro" Miller	Main role
2004	All Grown Up!	Lil Q	Episode: "It's Cupid, Stupid"
2005	Ned's Declassified School Survival Guide	Himself	Episode: "Emergency Drills & Late Bus"
2008	Out of Jimmy's Head	Himself	Episode: "Lunch Tables"
2010	The Defenders	Killa Diz	Episode: "Nevada v. Killa Diz"
2011	Dancing with the Stars	Himself	Contestant (season 12)
2011	The Cape	Lil' Z	Episode: "Razer"
2011	Reed Between the Lines	Darius	Episode: "Let's Talk About Competition"
2011	Charlie's Angels	Mark Bakale	Episode: "Royal Angels"
2012	The Choice	Himself	Episode #1.1
2012	Single Ladies	Scotty	Episode: "Deuces"
2012	How to Rock	Trey Grant	Episode: "How to Rock a High School Sensation"
2013	The Love Letter	Aaron	Television film
2014	Survivor's Remorse	Jay Holbrook	Episode: "Out of the Past"
2015	A Royal Family Holiday	Flip Royal	Television film
2015	Royal Family Christmas	Flip Royal	Television film
2015–2016	Master P's Family Empire	Himself	Main role
2016	Empire	Gram	Recurring role (season 3)
2016–2020	Growing Up Hip Hop	Himself	Main role (seasons 1–5, 7)
2017	Hip Hop Squares	Himself	Contestant; episode: "Master P vs Romeo"
2017	Trivial Takedown	Himself	Episode: "Romeo Miller V. Lizzo"
2017	Making it in Music City	Himself	Episode: "Living in America"
2017	The Challenge: Champs vs. Stars	Himself	Contestant (season 1)
2018	Famous in Love	Pablo $$	Recurring role (season 2)
2018–2020	Ex on the Beach	Himself	Host (seasons 1–4)
2019	Tales	Rider	Episode: "Bodak Yellow"
2020	Celebrity Watch Party	Himself	Recurring role
2020	No Limit Chronicles	Himself	Episode: "Nightmares & Dreams"
2022	Wrath: A Seven Deadly Sins Story	Roger Thompkins	Television film
2026	Worst Cooks in America	Himself	Contestant; episode: "Reality Check: Lights, Camera, Boot Camp"

=== Video games ===
Year	Title	Voice role	Notes
2002	Street Hoops	Himself	Vocals
2003	Disney's Extreme Skate Adventure	Himself	Vocals, Character, Music

== Awards and nominations ==
- Billboard Music Awards
  - 2001, Rap Artist of the Year (Winner)
  - 2001, Music Videos: My Baby (Winner)
  - 2002, R&B/Hip-Hop: My Baby (Winner)
- Kids Choice Awards
  - 2002, Favorite Male Singer – (Nominated)
  - 2003, Favorite Male Singer – (Nominated)
  - 2004, Favorite Television Actor – Male for: Romeo! (Nominated)
  - 2005, Favorite Television Actor – Male for: Romeo! (Winner)
  - 2006, Favorite Television Actor – Male for: Romeo! (Nominated)
- Radio Disney Music Awards
  - 2003, Favorite Male Singer – (Nominated)
- Teen Choice Awards
  - 2004, Choice Breakout Movie Star – Male for: Honey (Nominated)
- Black Reel Awards
  - 2004, Choice Breakout Movie Star – Male for: Honey (Nominated)
- Young Artist Awards
  - 2005, Best Performance in a TV Series (Comedy or Drama) – Leading Young Actor: Romeo! (Nominated)
- NAMIC Vision Awards
  - 2005, Best Comedic Performance: Romeo! (Nominated)
- Image Awards
  - 2005, Outstanding Performance in a Youth/Children's Program – Series or Special: Romeo! (Nominated)
- Golden Raspberry Awards
  - 2013, Worst Screen Ensemble: Madea's Witness Protection (nominated)
- Urban Film Festival
  - 2019, Jury Award: I Got the Hook Up 2 (Winner)
