= David Oliver (singer) =

- Born: David Lee Oliver; January 8, 1942; Orange County, Florida, U.S.
- Died: June 6, 1982 (aged 40) Orange County, Florida, U.S.
- Genres: R&B; funk; soul; disco
- Occupation: Singer
- Years active: 1967–82
- Label: Mercury Records

David Oliver (January 8, 1942 – June 6, 1982) was an American soul singer best known for the quiet storm radio hit, "Ms" as well as his composition "Friends & Strangers", which was covered by Ronnie Laws in 1977. He also recorded the first version of the Cecil Womack song "Love TKO", releasing it as an album track on Here's To You in 1980.

== Biography ==
Born January 8, 1942, in Orange County, Florida, United States, to Jamaican parents, David Oliver did not begin singing until high school at the age of 15. All through high school and college, he sang in various groups. After a stint in the Air Force, he re-located to Los Angeles in 1967 and joined a group called Five Days & Three Nights. They were discussing a contract with Motown Records, but after negotiations fell through, the group disbanded.

By 1972, Oliver would go on to record background vocals on Redbone's Already Here album and he then sang with Mighty Joe Hicks's band during the mid-70s. He was signed to Mercury Records in 1977, recording four albums all produced by Wayne Henderson, of The Crusaders.

In 1978, the song "Ms", from his first album, reached number 13 on the R&B Singles chart, but one of his best self-penned songs was "I Wanna Write You a Love Song" on his follow-up LP. In 1980, he recorded a song by Cecil Womack, "Love TKO", that was missed by the majority of record buyers at the time of release, but later became a major hit for Teddy Pendergrass.

== Death ==
David Oliver died in Winter Park, Florida on June 6, 1982, at the age of 40. His death was reportedly from a seizure.

== Discography ==
- Jamerican Man - Mercury Records, 1977
- Mind Magic - Mercury Records, 1978
- Rain Fire - Mercury Records, 1979
- Here's To You - Mercury Records, 1980
