= God's Gift =

2006 film directed by Master P

- Directed by: Master P
- Written by: Britt O. Wynn
- Produced by: Master P Romeo Miller
- Starring: Romeo Miller; Zachary Isaiah Williams; Master P Erica Hubbard
- Cinematography: Master P
- Edited by: Master P
- Music by: Romeo Miller
- Distributed by: New No Limit Films
- Release date: July 15, 2006
- Running time: 76 minutes
- Country: United States
- Language: English

God's Gift is a 2006 direct to video American drama film directed by Master P produced, and distributed by Guttar Music Entertainment.

== Synopsis ==
The film is based on boxing, and Romeo's struggle with God and school. It also shows his struggle with his father's drinking addiction.

== Cast ==
- Romeo Miller – Romeo
- Zachary Isaiah Williams – Kid Romeo
- Master P – Romeo's father
- Erica Hubbard – Romeo's girlfriend

== Production and release ==
It was written by Britt O. Wynn. The movie starred Romeo, his father Master P and Romeo's co star from Romeo!, Zachary Isaiah Williams. The movie also had an appearance by Romeo's younger brother, Young V, his uncle Silkk the Shocker, and Lincoln Heights star Erica Hubbard. It was released on July 15, 2006.

== Reception ==
The film was described as ’a gritty tale of urban friendship’ by TV Guide.

== See also ==
- God's Gift Soundtrack
- List of hood films
