= Game Time =

Studio album by Lil' Romeo
- Released: December 17, 2002
- Recorded: 2001–2002
- Studio: Richie Rich Studios
- Genre: Hip hop
- Length: 62:00
- Labels: The New No Limit; Universal
- Producers: Myke Diesel; The Beat Boyz; Carlos Stephens; LST

Lil' Romeo chronology
| Lil' Romeo (2001) | Game Time (2002) | Romeoland (2004) |

Singles from Game Time
- 1. "2-Way" Released: April 23, 2002; 2. "True Love" Released: August 8, 2002; 3. "Play Like Us" Released: January 19, 2003

Game Time is the second studio album by American rapper Lil' Romeo. Originally scheduled for an April 16, 2002 release, it was ultimately released on December 17, 2002, through The New No Limit and Universal Records. The album also features guest appearances by Solange, Master P and Silkk the Shocker among others. The album peaked at number 33 on the Billboard 200 and had first week sales of 93,000 copies.

== Critical reception ==
Professional ratings
Review scores
| Source | Rating |
|---|---|
| AllMusic | 2.5/5 stars |
| Entertainment Weekly | D |
| Rolling Stone | 2/5 stars |
| Vibe | 3/5 stars |

Dan LeRoy from AllMusic found the album "overlong and musically malnourished" with its track listing and overuse of lazy sampling but gave credit to Romeo's charm on songs like "True Love" and "2-Way", concluding that he should follow in the footsteps of Will Smith and go into acting instead. Jon Caramanica, writing for Rolling Stone, said that Game Time "doesn't have much to recommend it, but if nothing else, Romeo has got his target demo on lock." Robert Ford of Entertainment Weekly felt throughout the album that "an overabundance of samples and fluff, not to mention unskilled flow, proves Romeo is still lil’ league."

== Track listing ==
| No. | Title | Writer(s) | Producer(s) | Length |
|---|---|---|---|---|
| 1. | "Intro" | Lil' Romeo; Master P | Myke Diesel | 0:56 |
| 2. | "Too Long" | Leon Ware; Arthur Ross; Lil' Romeo; Master P | Myke Diesel | 4:46 |
| 3. | "Play Like Us" (featuring Lil' D of Rich Boyz and Tyron) | Lil' Romeo; Master P; Lil' D | The Beat Boyz | 3:12 |
| 4. | "True Love" (featuring Solange) | Luther Vandross; Lil' Romeo; Master P | Myke Diesel | 3:47 |
| 5. | "Clap Your Hands" (featuring Lil' D of Rich Boyz) | Lil' Romeo; Master P; Lil' D | Myke Diesel | 3:33 |
| 6. | "Girlfriend and Boyfriend" | Larry Smith; Jalil Hutchins; Lil' Romeo; Master P | Myke Diesel | 2:54 |
| 7. | "Bring It" | Lil' Romeo; Master P | Myke Diesel | 3:33 |
| 8. | "Wanna Grow Up" | Mark Charlap; Carolyn Leigh; Lil' Romeo; Master P | Carlos Stephens | 3:29 |
| 9. | "Still Be There" | Teena Marie; Lil' Romeo; Master P | The Beat Boyz | 2:57 |
| 10. | "Commercial" (featuring Master P and Lil' D) | | | 3:17 |
| 11. | "Feel Like Dancing" | Lil' Romeo; Master P | LST | 2:48 |
| 12. | "Richie Rich" | Edward Archer; Howard Thompson; Robert L. Beaver; Jack Hill; Peter Joyner; Dennis Taylor | Carlos Stephens | 2:51 |
| 13. | "My Biz" (featuring Master P) | Lil' Romeo; Master P | The Beat Boyz | 3:08 |
| 14. | "Throw Em Up" | Lil' Romeo; Master P | The Beat Boyz | 3:05 |
| 15. | "We in There" | Lil' Romeo; Master P | Carlos Stephens | 3:02 |
| 16. | "Where They At II" (featuring Master P) | Lil' Romeo; Master P | Myke Diesel | 3:03 |
| 17. | "Make U Dance" (featuring Lil' Zane and Afficial) | Chip Taylor; Harry W. Casey; Richard Finch | Myke Diesel | 3:28 |
| 18. | "2-Way" (featuring Master P and Silkk The Shocker) | James Brown; Robert Ginyard | Presidential Campaign; Master P | 3:24 |
| 19. | "We Can Make It Right" | Martin Charnin; Charles Strouse; Lil' Romeo; Master P | Myke Diesel | 4:49 |

Sample credits

- "Too Long" contains a sample of "I Wanna Be Where You Are" by Michael Jackson
- "True Love" contains a sample of "So Amazing" by Luther Vandross
- "Girlfriend and Boyfriend" contains a sample of "Friends" by Whodini
- "Wanna Grow Up" contains a sample of "I Won't Grow Up" from the musical Peter Pan
- "Still Be There" contains a sample of "Young Love" by Teena Marie
- "Richie Rich" contains a sample of "I Got It Made" by Special Ed
- "Make You Dance" contains samples of "Angel of the Morning" by Chip Taylor and "That's the Way (I Like It)" by KC and the Sunshine Band
- "2-Way" contains samples of "Think (About It)" performed by Lyn Collins and "It Takes Two" by Rob Base & DJ E-Z Rock
- "We Can Make It Right" contains a sample of "It's the Hard Knock Life" from the musical Annie

== Personnel ==
Adapted from the liner notes of Game Time.

- Myke Diesel – engineering, mixing (tracks 1, 2, 4–7, 11, 16, 19)
- The Beat Boyz – engineering, mixing (tracks 3, 9, 13, 14), background vocals (track 13)
- Carlos Stephens – engineering, mixing (tracks 8, 12, 15)
- Anthony President – engineering, mixing (track 18)
- Branz Dimilo – engineering, mixing (track 18)
- Bernie Grundman – mastering
- Chris Bellman – mastering
- Robin Hill – sample clearance services
- Tim Alexander – photos

== Charts ==
=== Weekly charts ===
| Chart (2003) | Peak position |
|---|---|
| US Billboard 200 | 33 |
| US Top R&B/Hip-Hop Albums (Billboard) | 10 |

=== Year-end charts ===
| Chart (2003) | Position |
|---|---|
| US Top R&B/Hip-Hop Albums (Billboard) | 70 |
