= D The Business =

American rapper, actor, and entrepreneur

- Born: Donavin Rashad Hogan; January 15, 1990 (age 36); Houston, Texas, U.S.
- Other names: Lil D; Lil-D; Little D; D
- Occupations: Rapper; Entrepreneur; Songwriter; Actor; Real Estate Agent
- Relatives: Romeo Miller (Cousin); Master P (Cousin)
- Musical career
- Genres: Hip hop
- Years active: 2000–present
- Labels: L.I.E. Entertainment; No Limit Forever; No Limit; Soulja Music; Priority; The New No Limit; Guttar Music
- Website: www.dthebusiness.com

Donavin Rashad Hogan (born January 15, 1990), better known by his stage name D The Business (formerly known as Lil' D and Little D), is an American rapper, actor, entrepreneur, songwriter and real estate agent. D The Business gained fame as a young street rapper in the early 2000s at just 10 years old along with his cousin Romeo Miller (formerly Lil’ Romeo) after signing with No Limit Records, which was founded by his cousin, Master P. He was one of the few artists featured on Romeo's debut album Lil' Romeo, which charted the US Billboard 200 at number six and went on to be certified gold, selling over 500,000 copies within a month, which went on to be certified platinum by the Recording Industry Association of America (RIAA).

He was billed on early commercial releases as Lil' D or Lil D before eventually changing his stage name to D The Business in 2012. This name change was accompanied by his breakout street single We So Bout It featuring Master P, Black Don, and Lil Wayne.

In 2019, he released the song Fancy featuring Black Don, and in 2020, he released the single Flex featuring Romeo Miller & Young V. In 2022, he released the mixtape Back To Business.

Aside from music, D The Business is also an actor, realtor, and founder of numerous companies. Hogan also co-founded the independent label L.I.E. Entertainment and played a pivotal role in the creation of the record labels Guttar Music and No Limit Forever Records.

== Early life ==
Donavin Rashad Hogan was born in Houston, Texas, by way of Missouri City to parents Donald Morgan Hogan and Maxine Denise Miller, as well as family from the Calliope and Magnolia Housing Projects of New Orleans, Louisiana. He spent a lot of his adolescence around music, basketball and street life while still excelling in school academically. At the time Mo. City and Houston was sort of a melting pot of organized gangs and sports. He traveled frequently between Houston, Los Angeles, and New Orleans growing up. He is the cousin of rappers and entrepreneurs Master P and Romeo Miller. He is the cousin of rappers C-Murder and Silkk the Shocker, and he is the brother of rapper and pro athlete basketball trainer Black Don (formerly BBlak or Black). He attended Thurgood Marshall High School, where he played basketball, and graduated in 2008 with offers of athletic scholarships and credits for college courses he had taken while still in high school. D The Business was coached by LeBron James under the guidance of Michael Jordan at a basketball camp in Santa Barbara, Ca. Hogan and Romeo Miller also went to the Reebok-sponsored invitation-only basketball Teaneck, New Jersey–based ABCD Camp and both played on the AAU circuit for many years as part of the P.Miller Ballers alongside many now NBA professional players. He briefly attended college before leaving to focus solely on music and business. D The Business was signed to No Limit at the age of ten, after he wrote a rap and snuck with Romeo Miller into his fathers studio to record it. This inevitably started both of their careers in music.

== Music career ==
=== 2001–2004: Lil' Romeo, Lil' D, and No Limit ===
In 2001, Hogan known at the time as Lil' D and Little D was one of the only features on Romeo Miller's debut album, titled after his original alias Lil' Romeo. Also in 2001, D The Business was featured on his cousins Silkk the Shocker's remix single of "That's Kool", featuring Lil’ Romeo and Trina which was the second lead single for the Lil' Romeo album. Later that year, at just 11 years old he released his own debut hit single "Cotton Candy" featuring Lil’ Romeo executive produced by Master P and distributed by Priority Records off of his scheduled debut album titled "Meet Me At The Playground". The album was never released.

In 2002, during the spring D The Business along with his cousin Romeo skipped school for the road on a 15 date tour at only 12 years old. Later that year he was featured on multiple songs on Romeo's second studio album, Game Time via The New No Limit and Universal Records which included "Clap Your Hands" and the more notable single "Play Like Us" which spawned live TV performances of the song on Nickelodeon's 2002 "TEENick Summer Concert Series" hosted by Nick Cannon and on the television show Soul Train.

D The Business also featured on the 504 Boyz hit single Tight Whips off of their second album Ballers released on December 10, 2002.

In 2004, Hogan lead on the songs “Bobblehead” “Rich Boyz” “Can't Stop Us” released on Romeo's third studio album Romeoland via The New No Limit and Koch. D The Business was featured on "I Like That" “Dime Pieces" “We Can Make It" “Party" “Bobble Head" off of the soundtrack Romeo! TV Show (The Season) for the hit show Romeo! an American sitcom that aired on Nickelodeon from 2003 to 2006.

=== 2005–2007: Collaborations, Rich Boyz, and Guttar Music ===
In 2005 Lil' D's song "You Don't" was featured on the 504 Boyz Hurricane Katrina (We Gon' Bounce Back) album. Lil' D and C-Los were part of a street organization called “GUTTA Click” which prompted Master P to launch the Guttar Music Entertainment record label.

Also in 2005, Lil D, Romeo Miller, Valentino Miller, C-Los and Doug formed the rap group Rich Boyz and on November 22, 2005, they released their debut album titled Young Ballers: The Hood Been Good to Us on Guttar Music.

Hogan appeared on songs "Sittin’ Low" and "Fitted Cap” on the soundtrack album titled God's Gift which was Romeo Miller's first album to be classified as explicit released with his official name changed to Romeo.

D The Business also featured on Master P's Ghetto Bill: The Best Hustler In The Game, Vol. 1 on songs “Let Me See It” and “Hood Starr”.

In 2006, the release of the movie Repos Original Soundtrack included his song “Bang” as well as his features on “Back Up Off Me” and the movie's lead single “Repo” along with Master P and Black Don.

=== 2008–2011: Mixtapes, No Limit Forever, Collaborations ===
Black Don & Lil' D released a compilation mixtape titled “Live From The Gutta Vol. 1”.

In 2010, D The Business featured on Romeo's Patience Is A Virtue Mixtape on the song Feelin Myself with Will Smith’s nephew K. Smith. On May 25, 2010 at the time still known as Lil' D featured on Romeo Miller’s single entitled "She Bad”.

In addition, that year D The Business also performed at the VH1 televised 2010 Hip Hop Honors awards with his cousins Romeo Miller, Valentino Miller, Silkk The Shocker, his brother Black Don, along with Trina, Gucci Mane and Mystikal announced on stage by actress Taraji P. Henson to honor his cousin Master P and No Limit Records.

His appearance on the song “I Be Chasing Money” and his single “We Here” were both released on his brother Black Don's mixtape entitled The Scrimmage.

In 2011, D The Business would go on a tour with his cousins Romeo Miller, Master P and Silkk the Shocker, the tour was titled "No Limit Forever International". On August 19, 2011, D The Business featured on Romeo Miller's I Am No Limit mixtape and was billed on this project as “D” after dropping "Lil" from his stage name on songs such as "Rock Wit It”, "Catch Me If You Can", "Drop That", and his brother Black Don's single "Money Flow" with Master P & Romeo Miller.

D The Business also featured on Romeo Miller's Maserati Rome Inception Mixtape on the song Phone Sex.

=== Since 2012: New name, New label L.I.E. Entertainment ===
In 2012, Hogan formed a new independent record label with his brother Black Don titled L.I.E. Entertainment (Loyalty Is Everything) and he also officially changed his stage name to D The Business. On January 5, 2012, D The Business released his breakout single "We So Bout It" featuring Black Don, Master P, and Lil Wayne.

On June 28, 2013, D The Business released his debut solo mixtape, From Sidelines 2 Headlines, and on July 17, 2013, released the official video to the single We So Bout It.

His second mixtape Loyalty Is Everything, Vol. 1 was released on November 11, 2014, with the songs Sunny Days, On Right Now and Live It Up.

In 2017, he released the Lit Nights & Good Mornings EP on May 5, 2017, led by singles Gwap and the song All You Gotta Do (Say Yes).

On January 24, 2020, D The Business released the single Flex featuring his cousins Romeo Miller & Young V.

D The Business released the mixtape Back To Business featuring the singles Fancy and Tonight on March 11, 2022.

== Other ventures ==
=== Acting career ===
In 2004, D The Business was cast in the independent film Decisions. D The Business appeared as a school bully in the 2007 movie Uncle P.

=== Business Ventures and Real Estate ===
Hogan started many businesses and he is a licensed real estate agent in Texas.

=== Other media ===
Hogan is the co-founder and co-host of the Intellects Connect podcast which launched in 2021.

== Discography ==
Year	Title	Album | Mixtape | Single	
2001	Releases as Lil' D		
2001	"That's Kool" (Remix) (with Silkk the Shocker, Lil' Romeo, Trina)	Lil' Romeo	Featured Artist
2001	Where They At (with Lil' Romeo & Master P)	Lil' Romeo	Featured Artist
2001	Cotton Candy (Featuring Lil' Romeo & Master P)	Meet Me at the Playground	Lead Artist
2002	"Play Like Us” (with Lil' Romeo & Tyrone)	Lil' Romeo – Game Time	Featured Artist
2002	Clap Your Hands (with Lil' Romeo)	Lil' Romeo – Game Time	Featured Artist
2002	Where They at 2 (with Lil' Romeo & Master P)	Lil' Romeo – Game Time	Featured Artist
2002	"Tight Whips” (with 504 Boyz, Master P, Slay Sean, 5th Ward Weebie, Lil' Romeo & Papa Reu)	504 Boyz – Ballers	Featured Artist
2004	Bobblehead (with Lil' Romeo)	Lil' Romeo – Romeoland	Featured Artist
2004	Rich Boyz (with Rich Boyz & Lil' Romeo)	Lil' Romeo – Romeoland	Featured Artist
2004	Can't Stop Us (with Rich Boyz & Lil' Romeo)	Lil' Romeo – Romeoland	Featured Artist
2005	I Like That (with Rich Boyz & Romeo Miller)	Romeo! TV Show (The Season)Soundtrack	Featured Artist
2005	Dime Pieces (with Rich Boyz & Romeo Miller)	Romeo! TV Show (The Season)Soundtrack	Featured Artist
2005	We Can Make It (with Romeo Miller)	Romeo! TV Show (The Season)Soundtrack	Featured Artist
2005	Party (with Rich Boyz Romeo Miller)	Romeo! TV Show (The Season)Soundtrack	Featured Artist
2005	Bobblehead (with Romeo Miller)	Romeo! TV Show (The Season)Soundtrack	Featured Artist
2005	Let Me See It (with Master P, Black Don, C-Los, Tank, Pop & Ruga)	Master P – Ghetto Bill (The Best Hustler in the Game) Vol.1	Featured Artist
2005	Hood Starr (with Master P, Black Don, C-Los & Tank)	Master P – Ghetto Bill (The Best Hustler in the Game) Vol.1	Featured Artist
2005	Got Cream (with Master P & Black Don)	Master P – Remix Classics (Greatest Hits)	Featured Artist
2005	You Don't (with 504 Boyz)	504 Boyz – Hurricane Katrina (We Gon' Bounce Back)	Lead Artist
2005	"Cutt" (with Rich Boyz)	Rich Boyz – Young Ballers: The Hood Been Good to Us	Lead Artist
2005	B.I.G: We Roll Big (with Rich Boyz)	Rich Boyz – Young Ballers: The Hood Been Good to Us	Lead Artist
2005	Young Ballers: The Hood Been Good to Us (with Rich Boyz)	Rich Boyz – Young Ballers: The Hood Been Good to Us	Lead Artist
2006	Bang (with C-Los & Tank)	Master P – Repos Original Soundtrack	Lead Artist
2006	Back Up Off Me (with Black Don, Tank, C-Los, Krazy, Bengie B & Gangsta)	Master P – Repos Original Soundtrack	Featured Artist
2006	Repo (with Master P, Black Don, C-Los)	Master P – Repos Original Soundtrack	Featured Artist
2006	Let Me See It (with Master P, Black Don, C-Los, Tank, Pop & Ruga)	Master P – The Ultimate Master P	Featured Artist
2006	Sittin’ Low (with Romeo Miller)	Romeo – God's Gift	Featured Artist
2006	Fitted Cap (with Romeo Miller & Rich Boyz)	Romeo – God's Gift	Featured Artist
2010	Live From The Gutta Vol. 1 Mixtape (with Black Don, Master P, 2 Kool and various Guttar Music artists)		Lead Artist
2010	"She Bad” (with Romeo Miller & Black Don)	Single	Featured Artist
2010	Feeling Myself (with Romeo Miller & K Smith)	Romeo – Patience Is a Virtue Mixtape	Featured Artist
2011	Releases as D		
2011	Rock Wit It (with Romeo Miller, Black Don, Valentino, Ms Chee, Bengie B & Gangsta)	Romeo – I Am No Limit	Featured Artist
2011	Catch Me If You Can (with Romeo Miller)	Romeo – I Am No Limit	Featured Artist
2011	Drop That (with Romeo Miller & Tempo)	Romeo – I Am No Limit	Featured Artist
2011	Money Flow (with Black Don, Master P & Romeo Miller)	Romeo – I Am No Limit	Featured Artist
2011	I Be Chasin Money (with Black Don & Tempo)	Black Don – The Scrimmage	Featured Artist
2011	We Here	Black Don – The Scrimmage	Lead Artist
2011	Money Flow (with Black Don, Master P & Romeo Miller)	Black Don – The Scrimmage	Featured Artist
2011	Phone Sex (with Romeo Miller & T.E.C.	Romeo – Inception	Featured Artist
2012	Releases as D The Business		
2012	We So Bout It (featuring Black Don Master P Lil Wayne)	From Sidelines 2 Headlines	Lead Artist
2013	From Sidelines To Headlines		Lead Artist
2013	On Right Now	Loyalty Is Everything, Vol. 1	Lead Artist
2014	Sunny Days	Loyalty Is Everything, Vol. 1	Lead Artist
2014	Loyalty Is Everything, Vol. 1		Lead Artist
2016	Gettin’ Naked	Single	Lead Artist
2016	Connect 4 Freestyles		Lead Artist
2017	Gwap	Lit Nights & Good Mornings EP	Lead Artist
2017	All You Gotta Do (Say Yes) (feat. 2 Kool)	Lit Nights & Good Mornings EP	Lead Artist
2017	Lit Nights & Good Mornings EP		Lead Artist
2018	The FAB 5 Freestyles (with Black Don & 2 Kool)		Lead Artist
2018	Bout My Shit (with 2 Kool)	2 Kool – #ThoughtsAsTheSmokeFlow EP	Featured Artist
2019	Regulate Freestyle	Freestyle	Lead Artist
2019	Us Freestyle	Freestyle	Lead Artist
2019	Fancy (featuring Black Don)	Single	Lead Artist
2020	Tonight (featuring 2 Kool)	Single	Lead Artist
2020	Flex (featuring Romeo Miller & Young V)	Single	Lead Artist
2020	7.62 Freestyle	Freestyle	Lead Artist
2020	Back To Business Flow Freestyle^{[30]} (with 2 Kool)	Freestyle	Lead Artist
2022	Back To Business		Lead Artist
