= Romeoland =

Studio album by Lil' Romeo
- Released: September 21, 2004
- Recorded: 2003–2004
- Genre: Hip hop
- Length: 42:57
- Labels: The New No Limit; Koch
- Producers: Nick Cannon (exec.); Myke Diesel, TheBeats.com, Master P (exec.)

Lil' Romeo chronology
Game Time (2002)	Romeoland (2004)	Young Ballers: The Hood Been Good to Us (2005)

Singles from Romeoland
- 1. "My Cinderella" Released: November 9, 2004; 2. "My Girlfriend" Released: 2004

Romeoland is the third studio album by American rapper Lil' Romeo. It was released on September 21, 2004 by The New No Limit and Koch. Romeoland peaked at No. 70 on the US Billboard 200 and No. 29 on the Top R&B/Hip-Hop Albums chart.

== Critical reception ==
Professional ratings
Review scores
Source	Rating
AllMusic	3.5/5 stars
RapReviews	3.5/10
USA Today	2/4 stars

AllMusic's David Jeffries called it "an inoffensive kids album", but said it didn't have a bloated track listing, contained fresh production and found Romeo to be "a confident rapper with just enough bravado and just enough charisma", saying: "It's rare that the eight-year-old set and their parents can agree on an album, but Romeoland ends up being not only tolerable for parents, but actually enjoyable. That's rare in any genre, let alone the thuggish world of rap." Steve 'Flash' Juon of RapReviews found Romeo to still be a terrible rapper with a "monotonous" and emotionless flow, poor attempts to display attitude by imitating both 50 Cent and the Terror Squad, and lackluster production that leave very few highlights throughout the record, saying: "Combined with a couple of terrible skits featuring creepy children's voices (think Lollipop Gang from Wizard of Oz if they were high on smack) and way too much banal music (not to mention terrible singing by Intyana) this album is not only an insult to eardrums everywhere, but entirely the wrong direction for Rome to be taking his life in."

== Track listing ==
No.	Title	Length
1.	"Romeoland" (Skit)	1:21
2.	"Whoodihoop"	3:45
3.	"My Cinderella" (featuring Nick Cannon)	3:38
4.	"The One"	4:01
5.	"My Girlfriend" (featuring Intanya)	3:05
6.	"Missin You"	3:57
7.	"Bobblehead" (featuring Lil' D)	3:43
8.	"Rich Boyz" (featuring Rich Boyz, Lil' D)	3:04
9.	"Let Me Shine" (featuring Master P)	3:58
10.	"Like You (Skit)" (featuring Hercy)	0:13
11.	"Can't Stop Us" (featuring Rich Boyz, Lil' D)	3:41
12.	"My Crush" (Skit)	0:47
13.	"So Fly" (featuring Intanya)	2:34
14.	"If I Cry" (featuring Intanya, Tata and Young V of Rich Boyz)	3:45
15.	"Stomped Out" (hidden track)	2:25

Samples

- "My Cinderella" contains a sample of "If I Ever Fall in Love" by Shai
- "The One" contains a sample of "Love Come Down" by Evelyn "Champagne" King

== Chart positions ==
Chart (2004)	Position
US Billboard 200	70
US Independent Albums (Billboard)	6
US Top R&B/Hip-Hop Albums (Billboard)	29
