= Back in the Day (Ahmad song) =

1994 single by Ahmad

Single by Ahmad

from the album Ahmad
- Released: 1994
- Recorded: 1993
- Genre: West Coast hip hop
- Length: 5:18
- Label: Giant/Reprise/Warner Bros. 41416
- Songwriters: Ahmad A. Lewis; Stefan K. Gordy
- Producers: Kendal; Ahmad

Music video
- "Back in the Day" on YouTube

"Back in the Day" is a 1994 single by Ahmad. Released when Ahmad was only 18, the song is a nostalgic remembrance of childhood and young teenage years, from a somewhat jaded adult perspective. "Back in the Day" was Ahmad's only major hit single, making it to number 26 on the Billboard Hot 100 and number 19 on the US R&B chart. The song contains a sample of the Teddy Pendergrass song "Love T.K.O."; and it was the first single of his 1994 self-titled album and was RIAA-certified gold.

The TKO Remix of "Back in the Day" (produced By Maurice Thompson of Barr 9 Productions) is featured as the single and on the soundtrack of The Wood, a 1999 motion picture. The song also appears in the 2018 film Tag.

== Charts ==
=== Weekly charts ===
| Chart (1994) | Peak position |
|---|---|
| UK Singles (Official Charts) | 64 |
| UK Dance (Official Charts) | 22 |
| US Billboard Hot 100 | 26 |
| US Dance Singles Sales (Billboard) | 15 |
| US Hot R&B/Hip-Hop Songs (Billboard) | 19 |
| US Hot Rap Songs (Billboard) | 3 |
| US Rhythmic Airplay (Billboard) | 13 |
| US Cash Box Top 100 | 37 |

=== Year-end charts ===
| Chart (1994) | Position |
|---|---|
| US Billboard Hot 100 | 93 |
| US Hot R&B/Hip-Hop Songs (Billboard) | 92 |

== Certifications ==
| Region | Certification | Certified units/sales |
|---|---|---|
| United States (RIAA) | Gold | 500,000^{^} |
^{^} Shipments figures based on certification alone.

== Legacy ==
Mariah Carey's 12th studio album, Memoirs of an Imperfect Angel, featured an interpolation of "Back in the Day" on the track "Candy Bling". Travie McCoy's debut studio album Lazarus features a song titled "Akidagain" that interpolates "Back in the Day". On J. Cole's mixtape The Come Up, his song "School Daze" also interpolates "Back in the Day". Cassidy did an interpolation of this song entitled "Back in the day". In 2013, Complex added the song in its list of nineteen great songs made by teenage rappers in the last 19 years. Complex editor Kyle Kramer said "The blueprint for many songs by nostalgic teenagers since, "Back in the Day" perfectly captures the wistful vibe of the rearview look with its warm chorus and deeply descriptive verses. As a result, ever since back in the day, the song's been a classic."
