= 2-Way =

Single by Lil' Romeo featuring Master P and Silkk the Shocker

from the album Game Time
- Released: April 2002
- Genre: Hip hop, pop rap
- Length: 4:23 (album version); 3:22 (single version)
- Label: The New No Limit/Universal
- Songwriters: P. Miller Jr., P. Miller, King Miller
- Producer: Master P

Lil' Romeo singles chronology
"Tell Me a Story (About the Night Before)" (2002)	"2-Way" (2002)	"True Love" (2002)

Master P singles chronology
"Rock It" (2002)	"2-Way" (2002)	"Them Jeans" (2004)

Silkk the Shocker singles chronology
"Pop Lockin" (2001)	"2-Way" (2002)	"We Like Them Girls" (2004)

"2-Way" is the first single from Lil' Romeo's second studio album Game Time. The track features additional vocals from his dad Master P and Silkk the Shocker. It is an almost-complete cover of "It Takes Two" by Rob Base & DJ E-Z Rock, with slight lyrical alterations to the original (i.e. references in Base's own lyrics to himself) and additional samples. The song was played at the ending credits of Hey Arnold!: The Movie. It also appeared in the movie Kangaroo Jack.

== Music video ==
A music video for the track was filmed in April 2002. Two versions of the video were made. The first is when Romeo is performing the song in a basketball stadium & a basketball outfit. The music video also involves the North Miami Beach High School Marching Chargers. The second version includes a basketball game filmed at a Miami arena with the College Cheerleading National Champions Florida Atlantic University (FAU) Cheerleaders as well as scenes from Hey Arnold!: The Movie.

== Charts ==
Chart (2002)	Peak Position
US Hot R&B/Hip-Hop Songs (Billboard)	6
