= God's Gift (soundtrack) =

Studio album / soundtrack by Romeo
- Released: December 12, 2006 (US)
- Recorded: 2004–2006
- Genre: Southern hip hop
- Labels: Guttar Music; UrbanDigital; GoDigital
- Producers: Romeo (exec.); Master P (exec.); Mike Diesel

Romeo chronology
Young Ballers: The Hood Been Good to Us (2005)	God's Gift (2006)	Hip Hop History (2007)

Singles from God's Gift
- 1. "U Can't Shine Like Me" Released: July 29, 2005; 2. "Won't Stop, Can't Stop" Released: November 14, 2006

God's Gift is Romeo's fifth studio album and second soundtrack. The album was recorded between 2004 and 2006 and features explicit language, which was a first for Romeo. The second CD of the album includes a movie based on a boxing film. The album boasts numerous guest artists and has sold over 350,611 copies to date.

== Track listing ==
Disc 1

1. "I'm Here" 2:11
2. "Get Money" (featuring C-Los) 4:26
3. "Can't Stop, Won't Stop" 3:27
4. "Country N Gutta" (featuring Lil' Boosie & Bengie) 4:32
5. "I Need a Stallione" (featuring Blakk, Gangsta & T-Bo) 4:10
6. "Pullin' Up" (featuring Bobby V) 3:00
7. "Sit N Low" (featuring Lil' D) 3:14
8. "Say It to My Face" (featuring Master P) 4:48
9. "Rock with It" (featuring Master P, C-Los & Playa) 4:30
10. "I'm a Beast"
11. "Confident"
12. "Slow It Down" (featuring JoJo)
13. "U Can't Shine Like Me" (featuring C-Los & Young-V) 4:33
14. "I'm the Baddest"
15. "Mama Said" 3:02
16. "Get Buck"
17. "Rock My Fitted" (featuring Rich Boyz, Lil' D) 4:41
18. "Just Me & You" (featuring Silkk the Shocker & C-Los) 3:53
19. "Pops, I'm a Hustla" (featuring Playa, Ruga, C-Los & Tank Do) 4:51
20. "Tell the Band" (featuring Rich Boyz) 3:28

Disc 2

1. "U Can't Shine Like Me" [DVD]
2. "Shine" [DVD]
3. "Won't Stop, Can't Stop" [DVD]
4. "We Can" [DVD]

== See also ==
- God's Gift
