= My Baby (Lil' Romeo song) =

2001 single by Lil' Romeo

Single by Lil' Romeo

from the album Lil' Romeo
- Released: April 10, 2001
- Length: 3:42
- Label: Soulja Music Entertainment; Priority
- Songwriters: Freddie Perren; Alphonzo Mizell; Berry Gordy; Dennis Lussier
- Producer: Myke Diesel

Lil' Romeo singles chronology
| "My Baby" (2001) | "The Girlies" (2002) |

"My Baby" is a song by American rapper Lil' Romeo from his self-titled debut album. The song features additional vocals from Ms. Peaches and samples "I Want You Back" by the Jackson 5. Released as Lil' Romeo's debut single in April 2001, it topped the US Billboard Hot R&B/Hip-Hop Singles & Tracks and Hot Rap Singles charts, ending 2001 as Billboard's most successful rap song. It additionally reached number three on the Billboard Hot 100 and entered the top 40 in Australia and New Zealand.

== Lyrics ==
In "My Baby", Lil' Romeo rapped, "After high school, I'm going straight to the pros." In 2004, the Orlando Sentinel referred to that lyric in an article about Romeo playing basketball at Beverly Hills High School. Romeo accepted a full athletic scholarship to the University of Southern California in 2008. Romeo played for two seasons with the USC Trojans men's basketball team.

== Music video ==
The music video for the song depicts Lil' Romeo being chased by fans throughout a mall. The video ends with Romeo escaping the crowd of fans after being picked up in a helicopter by Master P and Silkk the Shocker.

== Track listings ==
- European 12-inch

A1. "My Baby" (radio) – 3:42
A2. "My Baby" (instrumental) – 3:39
B1. "My Baby" (club mix) – 3:42
B2. "My Baby" (a cappella) – 3:30

- European CD maxi-single
1. "My Baby" (radio) – 3:42
2. "My Baby" (club mix) – 3:30
3. "My Baby" (instrumental) – 3:39
- UK CD
1. "My Baby" (radio) – 3:42
2. "My Baby" (club mix) – 3:30
3. "That's Cool" (remix) – 3:56
4. "My Baby" (video)

== Charts ==
=== Weekly charts ===
| Chart (2001) | Peak position |
|---|---|
| Australia (ARIA) | 38 |
| Australian Urban (ARIA) | 12 |
| Germany (GfK) | 90 |
| New Zealand (Recorded Music NZ) | 33 |
| UK Singles (Official Charts) | 67 |
| UK Hip Hop/R&B (Official Charts) | 16 |
| US Billboard Hot 100 | 3 |
| US Hot R&B/Hip-Hop Songs (Billboard) | 1 |
| US Hot Rap Songs (Billboard) | 1 |
| US Rhythmic Airplay (Billboard) | 12 |

=== Year-end charts ===
| Chart (2001) | Position |
|---|---|
| US Billboard Hot 100 | 74 |
| US Hot R&B/Hip-Hop Singles & Tracks (Billboard) | 38 |
| US Hot Rap Singles (Billboard) | 1 |
| US Rhythmic Top 40 (Billboard) | 67 |

== Release history ==
| Region | Date | Format(s) | Label(s) | Ref. |
|---|---|---|---|---|
| United States | April 10, 2001 | Urban radio | Soulja Music Entertainment; Priority | |
| United States | May 29, 2001 | Contemporary hit radio | Soulja Music Entertainment; Priority | |
| Australia | July 30, 2001 | CD | Soulja Music Entertainment; Priority; Virgin | |
| United Kingdom | September 10, 2001 | CD; cassette | Soulja Music Entertainment; Priority; Virgin | |

== See also ==
- List of number-one R&B singles of 2001 (U.S.)
- List of Billboard number-one rap singles of the 2000s
