= The Doctor (Mary Wells song) =

Single by Mary Wells

from the album Servin' Up Some Soul
- B-side: "Two Lovers' History"
- Released: 1968
- Genre: Soul
- Label: Jubilee
- Songwriters: Mary Wells Womack; Cecil D. Womack
- Producers: Mary Wells Womack; Cecil Womack

"The Doctor" is a 1968 single recorded and released by singer Mary Wells, released on the Jubilee Records label. The single was the first to be issued on Wells' debut Jubilee album, Servin' Up Some Soul. This was notable as the first released collaboration by Wells and then-husband, The Valentinos' backup singer Cecil Womack. Wells had married Womack in 1966 and as a result credits for the single were for "Mary Wells Womack" and "Cecil Womack". The single became a modest charter for Wells when released. Though Wells was given only scant promotion for the single, it peaked at number 65 on the Billboard Hot 100 and number twenty-two on the R&B chart. The b-side of the single, the soulful ballad "Two Lovers' History", was later sampled by J Dilla for the instrumental, "History".

== Credits ==
- Lead vocal by Mary Wells
- Background vocals by Cecil Womack
- Produced by Cecil Womack and Mary Wells Womack
