= Mind Magic (album) =

Studio album by David Oliver
- Released: 1978
- Recorded: 1978
- Genre: Soul; funk
- Label: Mercury
- Producer: Wayne Henderson

David Oliver chronology
| Jamerican Man (1977) | Mind Magic (1978) | Rain Fire (1979) |

Professional ratings
Review scores
| Source | Rating |
|---|---|
| AllMusic | 2.5/5 stars |

Mind Magic is the second album by vocalist David Oliver.

== Track listing ==
1. Who Are You 3:43
2. I Wanna Write You a Love Song 6:13
3. Housewives Are People Too 4:38
4. When the Thrill Comes 3:28
5. Private Secretary 3:44
6. One Night Man 3:38
7. Southern Comfort 3:45
8. I Surrender 3:26
9. Take My Emptiness 3:07

== Charts ==
| Chart (1979) | Peak position |
|---|---|
| US Billboard Top Soul LPs | 51 |
