= Mind Magic (magazine) =

American pulp magazine (1931)

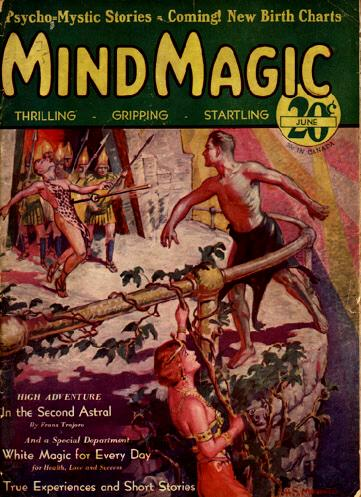
Cover of the first issue, by H.S. Moskowitz

Mind Magic was an American pulp magazine which published six issues in 1931. The publisher was Shade Publishing Company of Philadelphia, and the editor was G.R. Bay. It focused on occult fantasy and non-fiction articles about occult topics. After four issues it changed its title to My Self, perhaps in order to broaden its appeal, but it ceased publication the following issue. Writers who appeared in its pages include Ralph Milne Farley, August Derleth, and Manly Wade Wellman.

== Publication history and contents ==
In June 1931, Shade Publishing Company of Philadelphia launched Mind Magic. At only 64 pages, it was short for a pulp magazine; Shade had planned to set the price at 25 cents, but settled on 20 cents for the launch, which was still higher than most of the magazines it competed with. The editor was G.R. Bay, who was probably the main person in Shade who was interested in offbeat and unusual stories. The target audience was readers interested in the occult and spiritualism. The non-fiction in the magazine including stories of supposedly true experiences with the supernatural, and articles with titles such as "Make Your Ideas Work" and "Secret of Riches". The fiction, described in the magazine as "Psycho-Mystic Stories", was formulaic: magazine historians Mike Ashley and Frank Parnell describe the material as "slight, shallow stories with undeveloped ideas". Among the better-known writers were Manly Wade Wellman, who appeared in the first issue with "Faithful Footsteps", and August Derleth, whose "Wraiths of the Sea" was in the following issue. Ralph Milne Farley's "The Man From Ouija Land" was one of the longer stories to appear; it was serialized in the July and August issues, and later printed in the UK under the title Dangerous Love. Other authors included Ed Earl Repp and Mary Elizabeth Counselman. The title was changed to My Self after four issues, Ashley and Parnell suggest that this might have been in order to broaden the appeal of the magazine, but it did not work, and the December 1931 issue proved to be its last.

== Bibliographic details ==
The publisher was Shade Publishing Co. of Philadelphia; the editor was Bay throughout, though he was only credited on the final two issues. There were six issues, in one volume of six numbers; it was monthly, running from June 1931 to December 1931, with a combined September/October issue. It was in pulp format, with 64 pages, and was priced at 20 cents.

== Sources ==
- Ashley, Mike (2000). The Time Machines: The Story of the Science-Fiction Pulp Magazines from the beginning to 1950. Liverpool: Liverpool University Press. ISBN 0-85323-865-0.
- Ashley, Mike; Parnell, Frank H. (1985). "Mind Magic Magazine". In Tymn, Marshall B.; Ashley, Mike (eds.). Science Fiction, Fantasy and Weird Fiction Magazines. Westport, Connecticut: Greenwood Press. pp. 409–410. ISBN 978-0-313-21221-5.
