= Linda Womack =

American singer-songwriter

- Born: Linda Cooke; April 25, 1953 (age 73); Chicago, Illinois, U.S.
- Occupations: Singer; songwriter
- Label: Capricorn
- Formerly of: Womack & Womack (disbanded 2004)

Linda Womack (née Cooke; born April 25, 1953), now known as Zeriiya Zekkariyas, is an American singer and songwriter. She is the daughter of soul singer Sam Cooke. She later had a successful career as half of the duo Womack & Womack with her husband Cecil Womack.

== Early life and family ==
Linda Womack (née Cooke) is the eldest child of Barbara Campbell and Sam Cooke, born on April 25, 1953. Her parents married in 1958. In December 1964, when she was 11 years old, her father was killed. Soon after, her mother married Cooke's protégé Bobby Womack on March 5, 1965. In 1970, Barbara shot at him after she discovered he was having sex with Linda, who was 17-years-old at the time. According to Bobby Womack, Linda never spoke to her mother again after that incident.

== Career ==
In 1972, Linda co-wrote Bobby Womack's 1972 hit song "Woman's Gotta Have It". In 1979, she signed to Capricorn Records and went on the road with him. They planned to collaborate for her debut album. She gained renown as a songwriter of soul songs in the late 1970s and '80s, with "Love Bankrupt", released by Patti LaBelle; and the ballad "New Day" by soul singer and jazz guitarist, George Benson.

Linda married Bobby's brother Cecil Womack, and together they had a successful recording career under the name Womack & Womack. Their first album, Love Wars, released by Elektra Records, was a critical hit. "Baby I'm Scared of You" was a Top 40 R&B single. Other albums included Radio M.U.S.C. Man (Elektra 1985), Starbright (Manhattan EMI 1986), Conscience (Island 1988) and Family Spirit on Arista/RCA in 1991. Their 1988 single "Teardrops" from the album Conscience was a worldwide hit. The song, written by Linda and Cecil (as Womack and Womack), featured Linda on lead vocals. The 1993 album Transformation Into The House Of Zekkariyas was their last as Womack & Womack.

In the 1990s, Linda and her family moved to South Africa. She records with her seven children as The House of Zekkariyas. Her husband died on January 25, 2013, in South Africa, aged 65.
