= Cecil Womack =

American singer-songwriter (1947–2013)

- Also known as: Zekkariyas
- Born: Cecil Dale Womack; September 25, 1947; Cleveland, Ohio, United States
- Died: February 1, 2013 (aged 65) Johannesburg, South Africa
- Genres: Gospel; R&B; soul
- Occupations: Singer; songwriter; record producer
- Instruments: Guitar; piano; vocals
- Years active: 1955–2006

Cecil Dale Womack (September 25, 1947 – February 1, 2013) was an American singer, songwriter and record producer. He was one of the musical Womack brothers, and had success both as a songwriter and recording artist, notably with his second wife Linda as Womack & Womack. In later years he took the name Zekkariyas.

== Career ==
Cecil Womack was born in Cleveland, Ohio, United States. He and his brothers Bobby (1944–2014), Harry (1945–1974), Friendly and Curtis, were a gospel group appearing in the mid-1950s on the gospel circuit, where they were seen by Sam Cooke of the Soul Stirrers, who signed them for his SAR records. As Cooke's protégés, they changed their name to the Valentinos and in 1961 began to sing and record for secular audiences. The Valentinos had hit records with "Lookin' for a Love" and "It's All Over Now", the latter being covered by the Rolling Stones. Cooke's death at an L.A. motel in December 1964, had dramatic consequences for the Womack Brothers as SAR folded and Bobby Womack, who was now married to Sam Cooke's widow, Barbara, left the group for a solo career. The Valentinos briefly disbanded before regrouping as a quartet in 1966, signing with Chess Records where they recorded the Northern Soul hit, "Sweeter than the Day Before", written by Cecil Womack and singer Mary Wells. Womack and Wells married in 1966 and formed the music publishing firm, Well-Wom, to market their jointly written songs. However, the group was dropped by Chess in 1968, after only two singles, and Cecil Womack decided to leave the Valentinos. The remaining trio of Harry, Curtis, and Friendly Jr. signed with Jubilee Records, where they recorded the Cecil-composed "Two Lovers History" and "Tired Of Being Nobody" before being dropped in 1970.

As the 1960s progressed, Cecil Womack secured a role away from performing as a songwriter and producer. As the husband of Mary Wells, he was well placed to provide several R & B chart successes for her including "The Doctor", "Dig The Way I Feel" and "Never Give A Man The World" on which he backed his wife on vocals, all released on Jubilee Records. Womack's later songwriting credits include "Love TKO" a major hit for Teddy Pendergrass, "I Just Want To Satisfy You" for the O'Jays, "Love Symphony" for Patti LaBelle, "Your Song" for Four Tops and "New Day" for George Benson.

== Womack & Womack ==
In 1983, Cecil and his wife Linda, who was Sam Cooke's daughter, began performing and recording together as Womack & Womack, and released a successful album, Love Wars on Elektra Records. The title track from the album was a no.14 hit in the UK, and the song "Baby I'm Scared Of You" was a hit on the Billboard R&B chart in the US. In 1988, their single "Teardrops", taken from their fourth album Conscience, became a major international hit reportedly selling more than 10 million copies worldwide. It reached no.3 in the UK, and no.1 in the Netherlands, Australia, and New Zealand.

After traveling to Nigeria, they discovered ancestral ties to the Zekkariyas tribe, and Cecil adopted the name Zekkariyas. In 1993 they released their final album with a major label, Transformation To The House Of Zekkariyas. They continued to write for other artists, including Ruby Turner and Randy Crawford.

== Covers of Cecil Womack songs ==
Mary Wells recorded the Valentinos "Two Lovers' History" in 1968. The Womack & Womack song "Love Wars" was covered by The Beautiful South for the 1990 compilation Rubáiyát. Eric Clapton, Elton John, K.D. Lang and The Sugababes are among the artists who recorded "Lead Me On". His best-known song “Love T.K.O." has been recorded by many artists. Originally recorded by David Oliver, the song was subsequently recorded by: Teddy Pendergrass, Boz Scaggs, Bette Midler and Michael McDonald. "Teardrops" has been covered by Lulu, Joss Stone, Sugababes, and Roosevelt.

Womack wrote "Wind Me Up" which was recorded by Neville Nash and released on the Kaleidoscope Records Limited label in 1982. It bubbled under the South African Singles chart from the week of 26 March to 16 April 1982.

== Personal life ==
In 1966, Womack married Motown singer Mary Wells at the Olivet Institutional Baptist Church in Cleveland. Prior to that Womack fathered a son, Mustafa Womack in November of the same year. They had three children. Womack and Wells separated after he discovered she was having an affair with his brother Curtis Womack. They divorced in 1977.

Cecil later married Linda Cooke, the daughter of Sam Cooke. This created an interesting family tree because Cecil's brother Bobby Womack had married Sam Cooke's widow and Linda's mother Barbara Campbell in 1965. Cecil and Linda had seven children together, and had homes in Africa and Thailand. After 1994, Womack was known professionally and personally by the name Zekkariyas.

== Death ==
Zekkariyas spent his final years traveling the world with his wife and children, using his time to explore his African heritage, spirituality, and knowledge of the continent as well as making music. He died of unknown causes in Johannesburg, South Africa, on February 1, 2013, at the age of 65.
