= Ahmad (rapper) =

American rapper (born 1975)

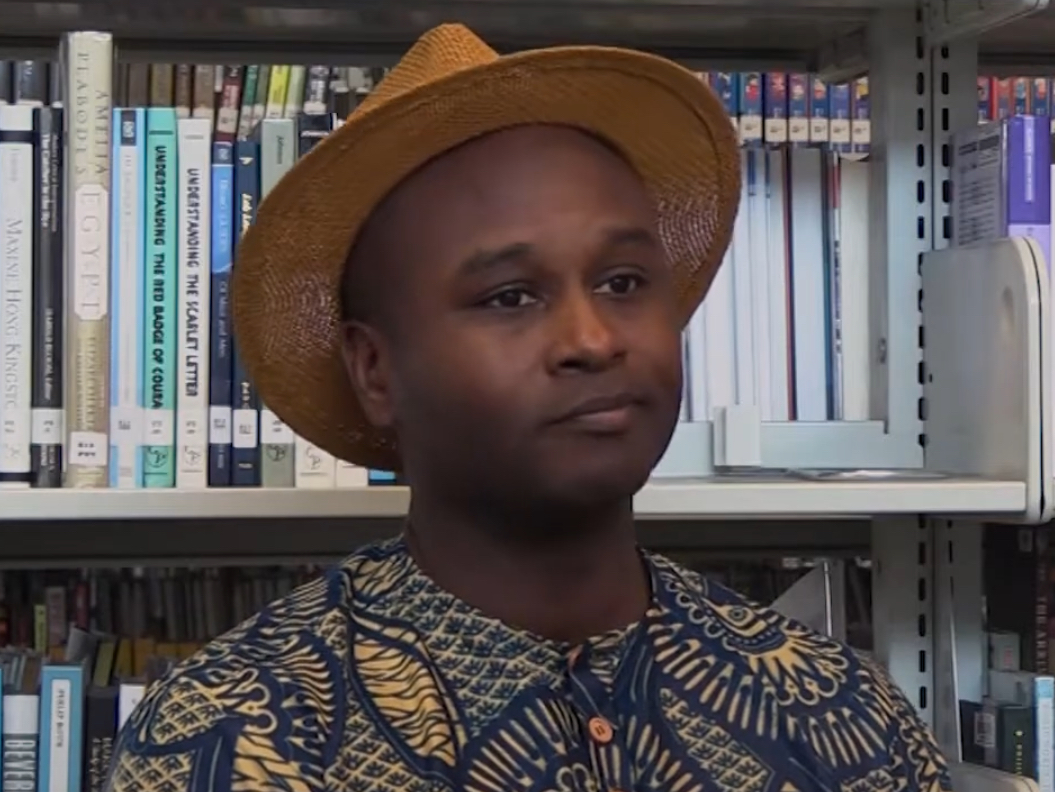
- Ahmad in 2018

Background information
- Born: Ahmad Ali Lewis; October 12, 1975 (age 51); Los Angeles, California, U.S.
- Genre: Hip hop
- Occupation: Rapper
- Instrument: Vocals
- Years active: 1993–present
- Labels: Giant/Reprise/Warner Bros. Records; Interscope/Universal Records; Lookalive/Gotee/EMI; WeCLAP
- Formerly of: 4th Avenue Jones

Ahmad Ali Lewis (born October 12, 1975), simply known as Ahmad (often stylized in all caps), is an American rapper, songwriter, motivational speaker and author. He is known for the 1994 single "Back in the Day". Ahmad is also a former member and founder of the hip-hop fusion band 4th Avenue Jones.

== Career ==
Ahmad made his recording debut in 1993 on the soundtrack of The Meteor Man with the song "Who Can". Released when Ahmad was 18, "Back in the Day" the remix version (produced by Maurice Thompson of Barr 9 Productions) hit No. 26 on the US pop charts and No. 19 on the U.S. R&B charts on the strength of its hook, sung over a sample of the Teddy Pendergrass song "Love TKO". It also reached No. 64 in the UK Singles Chart. It was the first single off his first album, Ahmad. The remix of "Back in the Day" is also featured on the soundtrack of The Wood, a 1999 motion picture. Ahmad secured his first recording contract as a senior in high school and earned a gold record for his chart-topping hit. He later formed the hip-hop fusion band 4th Avenue Jones.

He went back to school and enrolled in Long Beach City College in 2006; after graduating he was accepted by Stanford University, to acquire bachelor's degrees in sociology and African American studies.

Lewis was married to his former 4th Avenue Jones bandmate, Tena Jones, from 1998 to 2007. Their son, Yeshuwa Ali, was born in 2004.

Lewis is a practicing Christian.

== Discography ==
=== Albums ===
Solo

- 1994: Ahmad (Giant/Reprise/Warner Bros. Records)
- 2010: The Death of Me (WeCLAP)

With 4th Avenue Jones

- 2000: No Plan B (Lookalive Records)
- 2002: No Plan B pt. 2 (Lookalive/Interscope Records)
- 2002: Gumbo (Lookalive Records)
- 2003: Hiprocksoul (Lookalive Records)
- 2004: Respect (Lookalive Records)
- 2005: Stereo: The Evolution of Hiprocksoul (Lookalive/Gotee/EMI Records)

=== Singles ===
- 1994: "Back in the Day" (US No. 26; UK No. 64)

With 4th Avenue Jones:

- 2000: "Respect"
- 2002: "Move On"
- 2005: "Stereo"

Videos:

- 1994: "Back In the Day"
- 1994: "You Gotta Be"
- 1996: "Come Widdit'"
- 2001: "Respect"
- 2002: "Move On"
- 2005: "Stereo"

=== Appearances ===
- 1993: "Who Can?" (from "The Meteor Man" (soundtrack))
- 1994: "That's How It Is" (from "Jason's Lyric" (soundtrack))
- 1994: "Come Widdit" feat. Ras Kass, Saafir (from Street Fighter (soundtrack))
- 1995: "Only If You Want It" (from Pump Ya Fist)
- 1999: "Back in the Day (Remix)" (from The Wood (soundtrack))
- 1999: "The Guest List" (from Something For Everyone To Hate (Sackcloth Fashion album))
- 2000: "Fresh Coast" (from Dust (Sup The Chemist album))
- 2004: "Give It Here" feat. Pep Love (from All Balls Don't Bounce revisited (2LP) (Aceyalone album)
- 2006: "Hard Hit" (from The Movement (D.I.T.C. album)
- 2006: "Fight Here" feat. Afrobots, DJ Vajra (from 5 Sparrows For 2 Cents (The Procussions album))
- 2006: "More" (from Pro Pain (Mars ILL album))
