= Herman "Roscoe" Ernest III =

American drummer

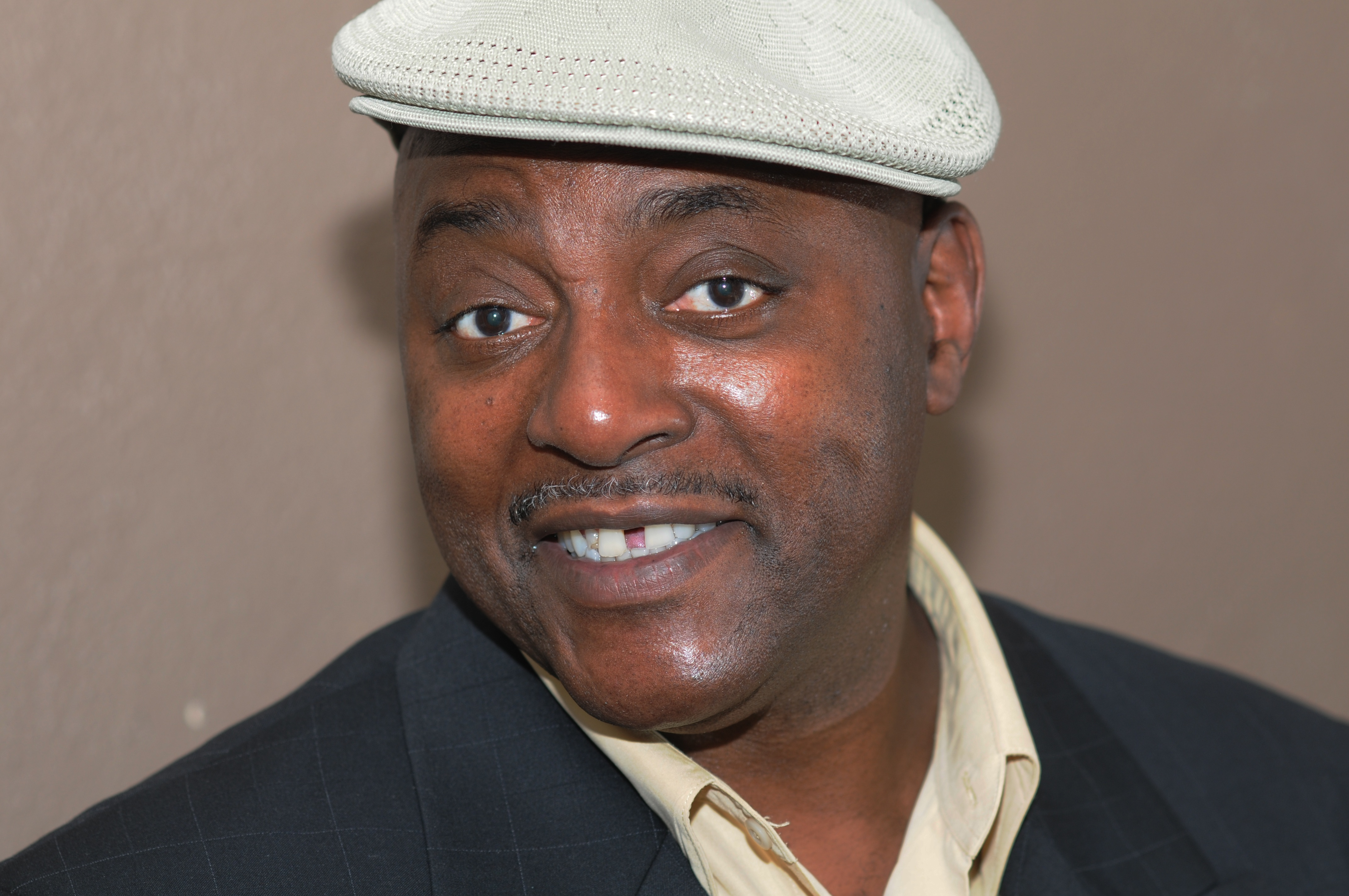

Background information
- Also known as: Roscoe
- Born: Herman Villere Griffin; August 12, 1951; Louisiana
- Origin: New Orleans
- Died: March 6, 2011 (aged 59)
- Genres: Blues, rock, New Orleans R&B, funk
- Occupations: Drummer, arranger, producer
- Instruments: Drums, percussion, vocals
- Years active: 1971–2011

Herman Ernest III (August 12, 1951 – March 6, 2011), best known as Roscoe, was an American session drummer and, for 30 years, the drummer for Dr. John. He was most active in the New Orleans Funk scene and referred to his playing style as "diesel funk".

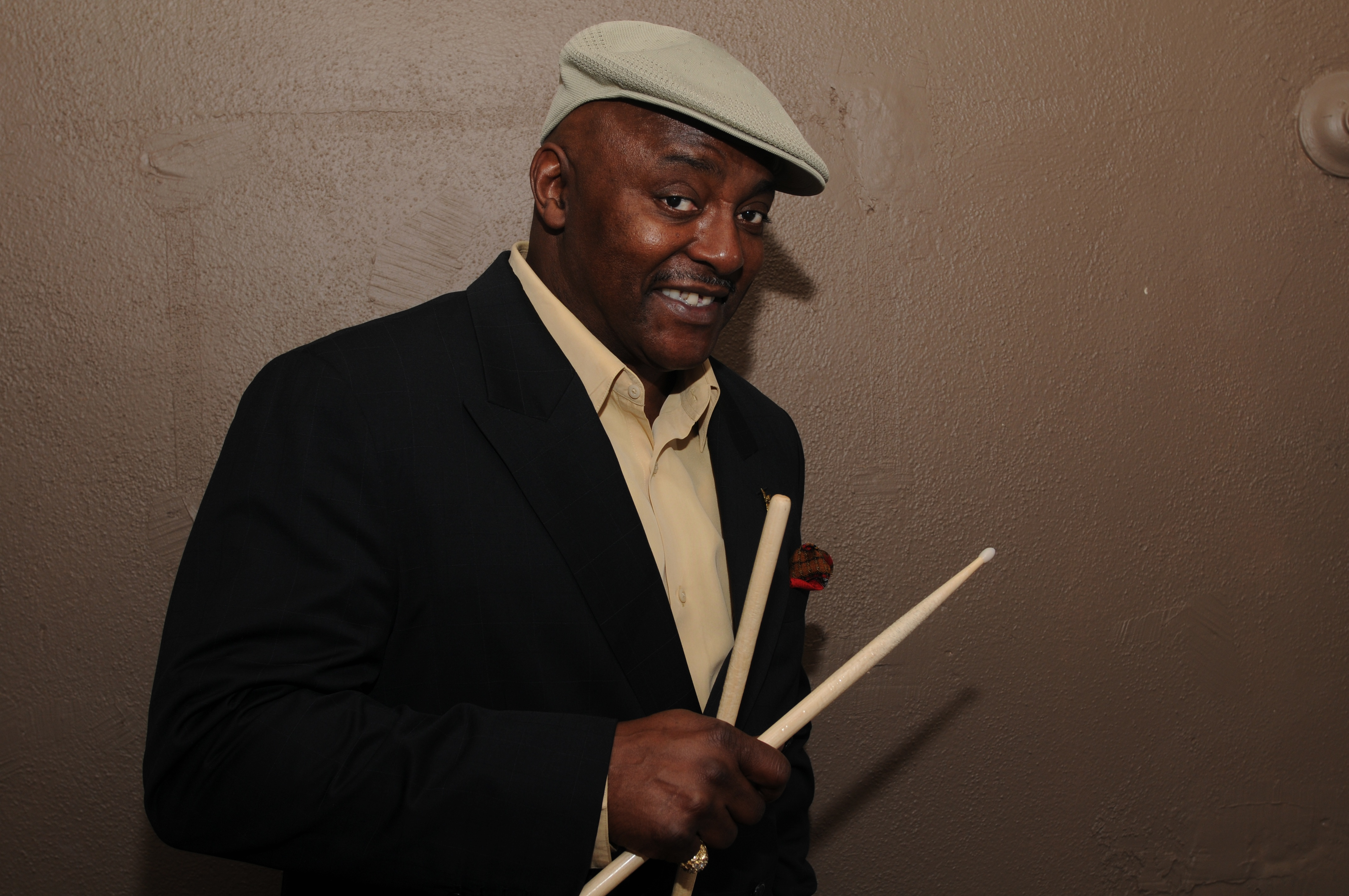
Herman Ernest with drum sticks

== Early life and career ==
Little is known about Ernest's early life, other than that he was one of 10 children born to Beatrice Webb. Ernest was the son of Webb's first husband, Herman Griffin; Webb's second husband, Adam Ernest, adopted Herman. It is likely that Ernest attended Mangham High School, in Mangham, Louisiana.

In 1971, Ernest was hired as the drummer of King Floyd's band, the Rhythm Masters. After a split from the singer the band was named World Blues; it dwindled and Ernest formed a club band with Teddy Royal called Cypress. In 1973, he was hired by Allen Toussaint to play on the Labelle album Nightbirds; that set him up to play on a string of successful albums for some of the most prominent blues musicians of the time, including John Mayall and Richie Havens. In 1979, with Tango Palace, he began playing with Dr. John and would stay with him for the rest of his life.

Known for his larger-than-life personality, Roscoe was both a powerful percussionist and a "steadfast individual". Of Ernest as a collaborator, Dr. John said "Whatever I put as a drum thing, Herman shifted all of that immediately. And he always came up with something that was better." He added: "Some guys are in your corner to a point, but they ain't goin' beyond that point. He wasn't like that. Wherever it went, that's where he was. That's a special thing in my heart. He was a loyal cat, right to the bitter end."

== Personal life, death and legacy ==
Ernest was married, with no children. He was much in demand as a studio drummer and spent the majority of his time recording, but he was very active in the New Orleans community. He was a deputy sheriff for the New Orleans Police Department and dedicated time during Mardi Gras and Thanksgiving to ensure peace was kept throughout the city. He played drums for his mother's church (The Greater Liberty Baptist Church) and, with musician Alonzo Bowens, taught drumming to children at the Louis Armstrong Summer Jazz Camp.

He died of oral cancer on March 6, 2011, at age 59. Before his death, he challenged the New Orleans Musicians Assistance Foundation (NOMAF) to promote head and neck cancer awareness, prevention, and early detection in his community. After his death, the New Orleans Musicians' Clinic and Healing Hands Across the Divide co-founded The Herman Ernest Memorial Screening Initiative, which provides head and neck cancer screenings to musicians and the community at large.

== Discography ==
- Labelle – Nightbirds (1974)
- Norma Jean & Ray J. – Raising Hell (1974)
- John Mayall - Notice to Appear (1975)
- Labelle - Phoenix (1975)
- Richie Havens – The End of the Beginning (1976)
- William "Smitty" Smith – A Good Feelin' (1976)
- Jussi & The Boys – Mennään Melomaan (1976)
- The Dameans – Day Of The Son (1976)
- Brian Hyland – In A State Of Bayou (1977)
- Richie Havens – Mirage (1977)
- Linda Lewis – Woman Overboard (1977)
- Lee Dorsey – Night People (1978)
- Johnny Adams – After All the Good Is Gone (1977)
- Dr. John – Tango Palace (1979)
- Al Johnson – Peaceful (1980)
- Patti LaBelle – Released (1980)
- Etta James – Changes (1980)
- Ramsey Lewis: Routes (1980)
- Clem Easterling – Just In Time (1981)
- The Neville Brothers – Fiyo on the Bayou (1981)
- Janis Siegel – Experiment in White (1982)
- Louisiana Purchase – Louisiana Purchase (1984)
- Solomon Burke – A Change Is Gonna Come (1986)
- Aaron Neville – Orchid in the Storm (1986)
- Snooks Eaglin – Baby, You Can Get Your Gun! (1987)
- Johnny Adams – Room with a View of the Blues (1988)
- Irma Thomas – The Way I Feel (1988)
- Ramsey Lewis – Blues For The Night Owl (1990)
- Jimmy McCracklin – My Story (1991)
- Black Top Blues-A-Rama, Vol. 6: Live at Tipitina's (1992)
- Grady Gaines & The Texas Upsetters – Horn of Plenty (1992)
- Maria Muldaur – Louisiana Love Call (1992)
- Snooks Eaglin – Teasin' You (1992)
- Irma Thomas – True Believer, 1992
- Earl King – Hard River to Cross (1993) (vocals)
- Solomon Burke – Soul of the Blues (1993)
- Maceo Parker – Southern Exposure (1993)
- Guitar Shorty – Topsy Turvy (1993)
- Marva Wright – Born with the Blues (1993)
- Irma Thomas – Walk Around Heaven: New Orleans Gospel Soul (1994)
- Carol Fran & Clarence Hollimon – See There! (1994)
- Eddy Louiss – Louissiana (1995)
- Snooks Eaglin – Soul's Edge (1995)
- Davell Crawford – Let Them Talk (1995)
- Dr. John – Live at Montreux 1995 (2005)
- Carl Weathersby – Don't Lay Your Blues on Me (1996)
- Andy J. Forest – Hogshead Cheese (1996)
- Luther "Guitar Junior" Johnson – Slammin' on the West Side (1996)
- Billy Branch – Satisfy Me (1996)
- Andy J. Forest – Blue Orleans (1997)
- Junior Wells – Come On in This House (1997)
- Carl Weathersby – Looking Out My Window (1997)
- Labelle – Something Silver (1997)
- Dr. John – Trippin' Live (1997)
- Dr. John – Anutha Zone (1998)
- Larry McCray – Born to Play the Blues (1998)
- Phillip Walker – I Got a Sweet Tooth (1998)
- Dr. John – Duke Elegant (2000)
- Johnny Adams – There Is Always One More Time (2000)
- Joe Krown – Buckle Up (2000)
- Dr. John – Creole Moon (2001)
- Irma Thomas – If You Want It, Come and Get It (2001)
- Andy J. Forest – Sunday Rhumba (2001)
- Dr. John – Live At Wrightegaarden (2001)
- Anders Osborne – Bury the Hatchet (2002)
- Shemekia Copeland – Talking to Strangers (2002)
- Richie Havens – Dreaming as One: The A&M Years (2004)
- Dr. John – N'Awlinz: Dis Dat or d'Udda (2004)
- Dr. John – Live at Montreux (1995)
- Dr. John – Sippiana Hericane (2005)
- Marva Wright – Do Right Woman: The Soul of New Orleans (2006)
- Paul Sanchez – Between Friends (2006)
- Dr. John – Mercenary (2006)
- Jools Holland & His Rhythm & Blues Orchestra – Moving Out to the Country (2006)
- Dr. John – Right Place, Right Time: Live at Tipitina's (2006)
- Papa's Two Feet: Papa's Two Feet at The Maple Leaf, New Orleans (2007)
- Goin' Home: A Tribute to Fats Domino (2007)
- Vee Allen – Woman Enough (2007)
- Aaron Neville – Christmas & Hits Duos (2008)
- Marcia Ball – Peace, Love & BBQ (2008)
- Dr. John – City That Care Forgot (2008)
- Jeremy Davenport – We'll Dance 'Til Dawn (2009)
- Treme: Music From the HBO Original Series (2010)
- Gregg A. Smith – Forever Young (2010)
- Josh Charles – Love, Work & Money (2010)
- Tribal – Dr. John and the Lower 911 (2010)
- Etta James – Live At Montreux 1993 (2012)
- Shannon McNally – Small Town Talk: Songs of Bobby Charles (2013)
- Etta James – It Takes Love To Keep a Woman: The Allen Toussaint Sessions (2014)
- Benny Turner – When She's Gone (2016)
