= Clarence Edwards =

Clarence Edwards may refer to:

- Clarence Ransom Edwards (1859–1931), American general
- Clarence Edwards (blues musician) (1933–1993), American blues musician
