= Clarence Edwards (blues musician) =

American singer (1933–1993)

- Born: March 25, 1933; Lindsay, Louisiana, United States
- Died: May 20, 1993 (aged 60) Baton Rouge, Louisiana, United States
- Genres: Swamp blues, Louisiana blues, electric blues
- Occupations: Guitarist, singer, songwriter
- Instruments: Guitar, vocals
- Years active: Mid 1950s–1993
- Label: Various

Clarence Edwards (March 25, 1933 – May 20, 1993) was an American blues musician from Louisiana, best known for his recordings of "Lonesome Bedroom Blues" and "I Want Somebody". It was not until the late 1980s that Edwards was able to establish his reputation as a blues performer, assisted by his producer and manager Stephen Coleridge.

== Biography ==
Edwards was born in Lindsay, Louisiana, one of 14 children, and relocated with his family at the age of 12 to Baton Rouge. He joined the Boogie Beats, a local blues band, along with one of his brothers, Cornelius, in the mid-1950s, and later played in the Bluebird Kings. Edwards was shot in the leg in a fracas outside a club in Alsen.

Initially, Edwards found full-time employment on a farm, but he later worked for 30 years at Thomas Scrap. Dr. Harry Oster recorded Edwards between 1959 and 1961, with Cornelius and the violin player Butch Cage. By 1970, when he next recorded, for the producer Mike Vernon, Edwards had moved from an older styling to a more contemporary approach. He was not widely known until the late 1980s, when he performed on the national blues festival circuit.

Swampin' (1991) and Louisiana Swamp Blues, Vol. 4 (1993) showcased the range of Edwards's style, which gained appreciation among blues aficionados.

Edwards died in May 1993, in Louisiana, at the age of 60.

His earlier work was posthumously remastered and issued on the CD Swamps the Word. The compilation album I Looked Down That Railroad was released in 2003.

== Discography ==
- Swampin', 1991 (New Rose Records)
- Louisiana Swamp Blues, Vol. 4, 1993 (Wolf Records)
- Swamps the Word, 1998 (Blues Factory)
- I Looked Down That Railroad, 2003 (Last Call)
- Baton Rouge Downhome Blues, 2023 (Wolf Records)

== See also ==
- List of swamp blues musicians
- List of Louisiana blues musicians
