= Those Prison Blues =

1959 album by Robert Pete Williams

Studio album by Robert Pete Williams
- Released: 1959
- Recorded: 1959
- Venue: Louisiana State Penitentiary
- Genre: Blues, field recording
- Label: Folk-Lyric; FL-109

Robert Pete Williams chronology
Angola Prisoners' Blues (1959)	Those Prison Blues (1959)	Free Again (1961)

Arhoolie Reissue Cover

Those Prison Blues is an album by blues musician Robert Pete Williams recorded by Harry Oster in Louisiana State Penitentiary in 1959 and 1960 and originally released on the Folk-Lyric label before being reissued with an altered track listing on Arhoolie in 1971.

== Reception ==
Professional ratings
Review scores
Source	Rating
AllMusic	3/5 stars
New Record Mirror	4/5 stars

Eugene Chadbourne's review on AllMusic stated: "Although some of these tracks are brilliant, there are more consistent collections available by this artist, as well as ones that are more generous with playing time".

== Track listing ==
All compositions by Robert Pete Williams except where noted

=== Original Folk-Lyric Release ===
1. "I'll Be Glad When I'm from Behind Iron Walls" – 5:23
2. "Louise" – 4:24
3. "Blue in Me" – 4:02
4. "Come Here, Baby, Tell Me What Is Wrong with You" – 1:57
5. "I Got the Blues So Bad" – 3:35
6. "Boogy Woman" – 3:06
7. "Pardon Renied (Denied) Again" – 4:44
8. "Army Blues" – 3:13
9. "Blues in the Dark" –
10. "Make Me a Pallet on the Floor" (Traditional)
11. "Angola Special" – 4:12

=== Arhoolie Reissue ===
1. "Pardon Denied Again" – 4:44
2. "This Wild Old Life" <previously unreleased – 4:20
3. "Texas Blues" <previously unreleased – 5:07
4. "Up And Down Blues" <previously unreleased – 6:00
5. "I'm Blue as a Man Can Be" [aka "I'll Be Glad When I'm From Behind Iron Walls"] – 5:23
6. "Louise" – 4:24
7. "Blue in Me" – 4:02
8. "I Got the Blues So Bad" – 3:35
9. "Come Here Baby, Tell Me What Is Wrong with You" – 1:57

== Personnel ==
=== Performance ===
- Robert Pete Williams – guitar, vocals
- Hogman Maxey – 12 string guitar (on "Boogy Woman" and "Army Blues")

=== Production ===
- Chris Strachwitz, Harry Oster – producer
- Harry Oster, Richard Allen – engineer
