= Free Again =

Free Again may refer to:

- Free Again (Gene Ammons album), 1972, named after the Barbra Streisand song
- Free Again (Lou Bega album), 2010
- Free Again, album by Alex Chilton
- Free Again, album by Supreme Music Program, 2007
- Free Again (Robert Pete Williams album), 1961
- Free Again, album from Nancy Wilson discography, 1972
- "Free Again", 1966 hit song, from Barbra Streisand's Greatest Hits
- "Free Again", song by TNT from Transistor (TNT album)
