= Sippiana Hericane =

EP by Dr. John and the Lower 911
- Released: November 22, 2005
- Studio: The Barn at Bearsville Studios (Woodstock, NY)
- Genre: Jazz
- Length: 25:24
- Labels: Blue Note; Parlophone
- Producer: Dr. John

Professional ratings
Review scores
Source	Rating
AllMusic	2.5/5 stars
The Guardian	4/5 stars
Rolling Stone	3/5 stars

Sippiana Hericane is the first extended play by American musician Dr. John and his band the Lower 911. It was released on November 22, 2005, via Blue Note/Parlophone as a benefit EP to raise funds for New Orleans Musicians' Clinic, the Jazz Foundation of America and The Voice of the Wetlands after effects of Hurricane Katrina in New Orleans. Recording sessions took place at The Barn at Bearsville Studios in Woodstock, New York. Production was handled by Dr. John himself, with Ed Gerrard and Peter Himberger serving as executive producers.

The EP peaked at number 35 on the Billboard Jazz Albums and number 17 on the Traditional Jazz Albums in the United States. It also made it to number 22 on the UK Jazz & Blues Albums Chart. In 2007 it was nominated for a Grammy Award for Best Contemporary Blues Album at the 49th Annual Grammy Awards, but lost to Irma Thomas's After the Rain.

== Track listing ==
1. "Clean Water" (Bobby Charles) – 2:31
2. "Wade: Hurrican Suite" (Malcolm John Rebennack Jr.)
  1. "Storm Warning" – 3:18
  2. "Storm Suge" – 3:49
  3. "Calm in the Storm" – 3:28
  4. "Aftermath" – 3:40
3. "Sweet Home New Orleans" (Rebennack, Cat Yellen) – 8:13
4. "Clean Water (reprise)" (Charles) – 0:25

== Personnel ==
- Mac "Dr. John" Rebennack Jr. – vocals, piano, organ, producer
- John Fohl – guitar, backing vocals
- David Barard – bass, backing vocals
- Herman "Roscoe" Ernest III – drums, backing vocals

== Charts ==
Chart (2005)	Peak position
UK Jazz & Blues Albums (Official Charts)	22
US Top Jazz Albums (Billboard)	35
