= Meet Me at Midnite =

Studio album by Maria Muldaur
- Released: August 30, 1994
- Studio: Red Zone Studios, Burbank, CA.
- Genre: Blues
- Length: 48:59
- Label: Black Top Records
- Producer: John Porter

Meet Me at Midnite is the thirteenth solo album by Maria Muldaur, released August 30, 1994. This album was nominated for the W.C. Handy Blues Award in 1994.

== Critical reception ==
Professional ratings
Review scores
Source	Rating
AllMusic	4/5 stars

Thom Jurek of AllMusic concludes his review with, "Meet Me at Midnite is one of those overlooked gems that got a second life. It's one of her strongest recordings; don't miss it."

Geoffrey Himes of The Washington Post writes, "Muldaur has a smokey voice and a slippery sense of phrasing that make Meet Me at Midnite a satisfying return to '70s-style roots-rock."

== Track listing ==
No.	Title	Writer(s)	Length
1.	"Trouble with My Lover"	Allen Toussaint	3:21
2.	"Meet Me at Midnite"	Rick Vito; John Herron	3:54
3.	"Send the Man Back Home"	Rory Block	5:03
4.	"Sweet Simple Love"	Bucky Lindsey; Dan Penn	3:21
5.	"Power in Music"	Jon Cleary	4:17
6.	"Ease the Pain"	Rick Vito; Norman Harris; Steve Moos	4:35
7.	"Trouble with Love"	Terry Wilson	4:24
8.	"Recovered Soul"	Earl Cate; Ernie Cate; Leroy Preston	3:58
9.	"Down so Low"	Tracy Nelson	4:20
10.	"Serve Somebody"	Teresa James; Terry Wilson	2:39
11.	"Woman's Lament"	Traditional	3:18
12.	"Mississippi Muddy Water"	Marty Grebb	5:49
Total length:			48:59

== Musicians ==
- Maria Muldaur – Vocals
- James "Hutch" Hutchinson – Bass (tracks 1, 2, 4, 5, 7 to 10, 12)
- Larry Fulcher – Bass (tracks 3, 6)
- Tony Braunagel – Drums, Percussion (track 1 to 10, 12)
- Johnny Lee Schell – Guitar (tracks 1 to 8, 12)
- Jon Woodhead – Guitar (tracks 5, 7, 10)
- John Porter – Dobro (tracks 12), Guitar (tracks 1, 9)
- Rick Vito – Slide Guitar (tracks 2, 6, 10)
- Bill Payne – Organ (tracks 5, 7), Piano (tracks 1, 4, 9)
- Tommy Eyre – Organ (tracks 2, 9)
- Marty Grebb – Piano (tracks 2, 3, 5, 7, 8, 12), Bariton Saxophone (tracks 1, 4, 5, 8, 9), Tenor Saxophone (track 5), Organ (tracks 4, 6, 10), Marty Grebb – Accordion (track 12)
- Joe Sublett – Tenor Saxophone (tracks 1, 4, 5, 8, 9)
- Darrell Leonard – Trumpet (tracks 1, 4, 5, 8, 9)
- Don Bryant – Background Vocals
- Dianne Carter – Background Vocals
- Dee Dee Dickerson – Background Vocals
- Mike Finnegan – Background Vocals
- Donny Gerrard – Background Vocals
- Charles Lovett – Background Vocals
- Shaun Murphy – Background Vocals
- Tracy Nelson – Background Vocals
- Ann Peebles – Background Vocals
- Becky Russell – Background Vocals
- Rugenia Faith Taylor – Background Vocals
- Vaneta Thompson – Background Vocals
- Darrell Leonard – Trumpet

== Production ==
- John Porter – Producer
- Jeff Palo – Producer
- Hammond Scott – Executive Producer
- Nauman Scott – Executive Producer
- Joe McGrath – Engineer
- Jerry Finn – Assistant Engineer, Engineer
- Matt Pakucko – Assistant Engineer, Engineer
- Rich Veltrop – Assistant Engineer, Engineer
- Andrew Warwick – Assistant Engineer, Engineer
- Shane Mooney – Editorial Supervision
- Derek Dressler – Project Assistant
- Ted Myers – Project Assistant
- Recorded at Red Zone Studios, Burbank, CA.
- Additional recording at Chapel Studio, Encino, CA & Kiva Studio, Memphis, TN.

Track information and credits verified from the album's liner notes. Some information was adapted from 45Worlds and AllMusic.
