= City That Care Forgot =

Studio album by Dr. John and the Lower 911
- Released: June 3, 2008
- Studios: Dockside Studio (Maurice, LA); The Music Shed (New Orleans, LA); Pedernales Studio (Spicewood, TX); Legacy Recording Studios (New York, NY)
- Genres: R&B; blues rock
- Labels: 429; Cooking Vinyl
- Producers: Dr. John; Herman Ernest III; The Jedi Master

Dr. John and the Lower 911 chronology
City That Care Forgot (2008)	Tribal (2010)

Professional ratings
Review scores
Source	Rating
All About Jazz	5/5 stars
AllMusic	4/5 stars
Robert Christgau	(2-star Honorable Mention)
Record Collector	5/5 stars
Rolling Stone	3/5 stars

City That Care Forgot is the first full-length studio album by American musician Dr. John and his band the Lower 911. It was released on June 3, 2008, via 429 Records/Cooking Vinyl. The recording sessions took place at Dockside Studio in Maurice, with additional recording at The Music Shed in New Orleans, Pedernales Studio in Spicewood, and Legacy Recording Studios in New York City. The album was produced by Jeff Jones, Herman Ernest III, and Dr. John. It features guest appearances from Eric Clapton, Terence Blanchard, Ani DiFranco, James Andrews, Terrance Simien, Trombone Shorty, and Willie Nelson.

At the 51st Annual Grammy Awards held in 2009, the album was won a Grammy Award for Best Contemporary Blues Album.

== Track listing ==
No.	Title	Writer(s)	Length
1.	"Keep On Goin'"	Malcolm John Rebennack, Jr.; Mina Bellavia	4:48
2.	"Time For a Change" (featuring Eric Clapton)	Rebennack, Jr.; Robert Charles Guidry	2:55
3.	"Promises, Promises" (featuring Willie Nelson)	Guidry	3:44
4.	"You Might Be Surprised"	Rebennack, Jr.; Guidry	4:00
5.	"Dream Warrior"	Rebennack, Jr.; David Lee Carson	5:00
6.	"Black Gold"	Rebennack, Jr.; Guidry	3:13
7.	"We Gettin' There" (featuring Terence Blanchard)	Rebennack, Jr.; Chris Rose	5:14
8.	"Stripped Away" (featuring Eric Clapton)	Rebennack, Jr.; Rose	3:36
9.	"Say Whut?"	Rebennack, Jr.; Carson	4:36
10.	"My People Need a Second Line" (featuring James Andrews and Trombone Shorty)	Rebennack, Jr.; Carson	5:20
11.	"Land Grab" (featuring Terence Blanchard)	Rebennack, Jr.; Guidry	3:58
12.	"City That Care Forgot" (featuring Ani DiFranco and Eric Clapton)	Rebennack, Jr.; Carson	5:38
13.	"Save Out Wetlands" (featuring Terrance Simien)	Rebennack, Jr.; Guidry	4:07

== Personnel ==
- Vocals: Ani Di Franco, Dr. John, Willie Nelson, Terrance Simien
- Guitar: Eric Clapton, John Fohl, Ani Di Franco
- Bass: David Barard
- Keyboards: Dr. John
- Drums: Herman "Roscoe" Ernest III
- Percussion – Herman Roscoe Ernest, Kenneth "Afro" Williams
- Horns: James Andrews, Terence Blanchard, Charlie Miller, Trombone Shorty
- Saxophone: Alonzo Bowens, Jason Mingledorff
- Strings: The Creodelphic Strings
- Backing Vocals: Tyrone Aiken, Shannon McNally

== Charts ==
Chart (2008)	Peak position
UK Independent Albums (Official Charts)	29
UK Jazz & Blues Albums (Official Charts)	11
