= Soul's Edge =

Studio album by Snooks Eaglin
- Released: 1995
- Recorded: November 1994
- Studio: Ultrasonic, New Orleans
- Genre: Blues
- Length: 68:08
- Label: Black Top
- Producer: Hammond Scott

Snooks Eaglin chronology
Teasin' You (1992)	Soul's Edge (1995)	Soul Train from Nawlins (1996)

Soul's Edge is an album by the American blues guitarist and singer Snooks Eaglin, released in 1995 on Black Top Records.

== Reception ==
Professional ratings
Review scores
Source	Rating
AllMusic	4.5/5 stars
Edmonton Journal	3/4 stars
The Encyclopedia of Popular Music	3/5 stars

In his review for AllMusic, Bill Dahl wrote: "Give this New Orleans master enough studio time, and he'll redo the entire history of postwar R&B his own way." The Chicago Reader wrote that "the core blues feel remains, but Eaglin's remarkable flexibility allows him to inhabit nearly any situation with grace, from the furious key-changing blues of bassist George Porter Jr.'s instrumental 'Aw' Some Funk', a real showcase for the guitarist, to the heart-wrenching lament his playing expresses on 'Nine Pound Steel'." The Times-Colonist wrote that "Eaglin drives the band with majestic blues string bending and grace."

== Track listing ==
1. "Josephine" (Fats Domino, Dave Bartholomew) – 6:05
2. "Show Me the Way Back Home" (Willie Tee) – 4:13
3. "Ling Ting Tong" (Mabel Godwin) – 4:00
4. "Aw' Some Funk" (George Porter, Jr.) – 4:55
5. "I'm Not Ashamed" (Don Robey) – 3:40
6. "Nine Pound Steel" (Dan Penn, W. Thompson) – 5:32
7. "Answer Now" (Porter, Eaglin) – 6:01
8. "Skinny Minnie" (Bill Haley, Milt Gabler, Rusty Keefer, Catherine Cafra) – 4:14
9. "Thrill on the Hill" (Hank Ballard) – 2:51
10. "You and Me" (Porter, Eaglin) – 6:13
11. "I Went to the Mardi Gras" (Eaglin, Ridgely, Scott) – 4:44
12. "Talk to Me" (Joe Seneca) – 5:23
13. "Mama and Papa" (Earl King) – 4:00
14. "God Will Take Care" (Traditional) – 4:17

== Personnel ==
- Snooks Eaglin – vocals, guitar
- Sammy Berfect – organ, piano
- David Torkanovsky – piano on 3, 7, 9, 11
- George Porter Jr. – bass, 2nd vocal on 7
- Herman "Roscoe" Ernest III – drums, percussion
- Fred Kemp – tenor sax
- Ward Smith – tenor sax, baritone sax
- Steve Howard – trumpet
- Rick Trolsen – trombone
