= Baby, You Can Get Your Gun! =

Studio album by Snooks Eaglin
- Released: 1987
- Studio: Southlake
- Genre: Blues
- Label: Black Top
- Producer: Hammond Scott

Snooks Eaglin chronology
Down Yonder (1978)	Baby, You Can Get Your Gun! (1987)	Out of Nowhere (1989)

Baby, You Can Get Your Gun! is an album by the American blues musician Snooks Eaglin, released in 1987. It was regarded as a comeback for Eaglin, who had not put out an album since 1978.

== Production ==
The backing musicians, in part pulled from Fats Domino's band, were considered to be some of New Orleans' best sidemen. Baby, You Can Get Your Gun! was produced by Hammond Scott.

== Critical reception ==
Professional ratings
Review scores
Source	Rating
AllMusic	3.5/5 stars
The Encyclopedia of Popular Music	3/5 stars
MusicHound Blues: The Essential Album Guide	3.5/5 stars
The Rolling Stone Album Guide	3/5 stars

The Washington Post wrote that "shuffle tunes like 'Oh Sweetness' roll with rhumba rhythms and the headlong momentum of a good Professor Longhair arrangement, and Eaglin even manages to detonate some James Brown funk on 'Drop That Bomb!'" The Los Angeles Times thought that Eaglin's "cognac-smooth vocals get down to serious business on the wryly twisted blues 'That Certain Door' and 'You Give Me Nothing but the Blues'." The Boston Globe opined that "Eaglin's pleasant voice and relaxed guitar preside over a potpourri of New Orleans styles." The News & Observer concluded that "David Lastie's tenor saxophone solos are models of climatic blues shouting."

AllMusic called the album "an earthly delight; [Eaglin's] utterly unpredictable guitar weaves and darts through supple rhythms provided by New Orleans vets Smokey Johnson on drums and Erving Charles, Jr. on bass." The Rolling Stone Album Guide deemed it "tough and rollicking."

== Track listing ==
No.	Title	Length
1.	"You Give Me Nothing but the Blues"	2:33
2.	"Baby Please"	3:15
3.	"Oh Sweetness"	3:14
4.	"Profidia"	2:18
5.	"Lavinia"	3:34
6.	"Baby, You Can Get Your Gun!"	2:50
7.	"Drop the Bomb!"	2:54
8.	"That Certain Door"	3:10
9.	"Mary Joe"	3:10
10.	"Nobody Knows"	2:15
11.	"Pretty Girls Everywhere"	3:33

== Personnel ==
- Guitar: Snooks Eaglin, Ronnie Earl
- Bass: Erving Charles, Jr., George Porter Jr.
- Drums: Herman "Roscoe" Ernest III, Smokey Johnson
- Keyboards: Ron Levy
- Saxophone: David Lastie
