= Teasin' You =

Studio album by Snooks Eaglin
- Released: 1992
- Recorded: October & November 1991
- Studio: Ultrasonic, New Orleans
- Genre: Blues, R&B
- Length: 47:38
- Label: Black Top
- Producer: Hammond Scott

Snooks Eaglin chronology
Out of Nowhere (1989)	Teasin' You (1992)	Soul's Edge (1995)

Teasin' You is an album by the American guitarist and singer Snooks Eaglin, released in 1992 on the Black Top label.

== Reception ==
Professional ratings
Review scores
Source	Rating
AllMusic	5/5 stars
Chicago Tribune	4/4 stars

The Chicago Tribune noted that "classic New Orleans rhythm and blues is alive and thriving." The New York Times wrote that Eaglin "plays like two guitarists at once, picking out lead lines in between strummed rhythm-guitar chords."

In his review for AllMusic, Bill Dahl states that "Eaglin's churchy, commanding vocals and blistering guitar work are nothing short of mind-boggling throughout the entire disc."

== Track listing ==
1. "Baby Please Come Home" (Lloyd Price) – 3:36
2. "Soul Train" (Earl King) – 4:04
3. "When It Rains It Pours" (Billy "The Kid" Emerson) – 3:03
4. "Teasin' You" (Earl King) – 3:28
5. "Dizzy, Miss Lizzy" (Larry Williams) – 3:14
6. "Black Night" (Jessie Mae Robinson) – 3:26
7. "Sleep Walk" (Santo & Johnny Farina) – 3:23
8. "Travelin' Mood" (James Wayne) – 3:23
9. "Jesus Will Fix It" (Traditional) – 3:34
10. "Don't Take It So Hard" (Earl King) – 3:52
11. "Heavy Juice" (Tiny Bradshaw) – 2:56
12. "Lilly Mae" (Smiley Lewis) – 3:06
13. "My Love Is Strong" (Earl King) – 2:39
14. "Red Beans" (Muddy Waters) – 3:54

== Personnel ==
- Snooks Eaglin – vocals, guitar
- George Porter Jr. – bass
- Sammy Berfect – organ, piano
- Herman "Roscoe" Ernest III – drums, percussion
- Grady Gaines – tenor sax
- Mark "Kaz" Kazanoff – tenor sax, baritone sax
- Keith Winking – trumpet
