= Fanning the Flames (album) =

Studio album by Maria Muldaur
- Released: 1996
- Studio: Dockside
- Genre: Blues
- Label: Telarc Blues
- Producer: John Snyder, Maria Muldaur, Elane Martone

Maria Muldaur chronology
| Jazzabelle (1995) | Fanning the Flames (1996) | Southland of the Heart (1998) |

Fanning the Flames is an album by the American musician Maria Muldaur, released in 1996. Muldaur labeled the album's music "bluesiana", a combination of blues and Louisiana good-time music. Muldaur included songs with political or topical themes, a choice she had rarely made in the past.

The album peaked at No. 14 on Billboard's Blues Albums chart. It was Muldaur's first album for Telarc.

== Production ==
Produced by John Snyder, Muldaur, and Elane Martone, the album was recorded at Dockside Studio Recordings, in Maurice, Louisiana. Bonnie Raitt duetted with Muldaur on "Somebody Was Watching Over Me". Mavis Staples, Johnny Adams, Ann Peebles, Tracy Nelson, and Huey Lewis also sang on, or contributed instrumentation to, the album. "Well, Well, Well" is a cover of the Bob Dylan song; Muldaur was inspired to record it after talking with Dylan about Jerry Garcia's death.

== Critical reception ==
Professional ratings
Review scores
| Source | Rating |
|---|---|
| AllMusic | 2.5/5 stars |
| The Commercial Appeal | 3.5/4 stars |
| The Encyclopedia of Popular Music | 3/5 stars |
| MusicHound Folk: The Essential Album Guide | 3.5/5 stars |

The Washington Post thought that when Muldaur "sings blues, R&B or hillbilly music today, she no longer skips lightly over the rhythm; she now reinforces the beat with her vocal oomph, and her throaty growls give her vocals a sassy edge they never had before." Newsday wrote that "it's the ease with which Muldaur can shift from a raw Texas honky-tonk vibe to sly Chi-town sophistication that makes this collection of tunes so interesting."

The Patriot-News stated that "longtime New Orleans keyboard stalwart David Torkanowski, while accorded minimal solo space, provides a vital melodic and harmonic foundation to the session." The Buffalo News concluded that Muldaur's "slightly surreal, baby-doll voice ... has deepened and roughened over the years, but her taste in what to sing remains gutsy and close to impeccable."

AllMusic wrote that "Muldaur belts out gritty blues and gospel and soulful R&B as very few can."

== Track listing ==
| No. | Title | Length |
|---|---|---|
| 1. | "Home of the Blues" |
| 2. | "Fanning the Flames" |
| 3. | "Trust in My Love" |
| 4. | "Somebody Was Watching Over Me" |
| 5. | "Heaven on Earth" |
| 6. | "Stand by Me" |
| 7. | "Talk Real Slow" |
| 8. | "Stop Runnin' from Your Own Shadow (feat. Huey Lewis on harmonica)" |
| 9. | "Can't Pin Yo' Spin on Me" |
| 10. | "Brotherly Love" |
| 11. | "Well, Well, Well" |
| 12. | "Strange and Foreign Land" |

== Musicians ==
- Maria Muldaur – vocals
- Cranston Clements – guitar
- Dave Torkanowsky – piano, Wurlitzer piano, Rhodes synthesizer, Hammond B-3 organ
- James "Hutch" Hutchinson – bass
- Steve Potts – drums
- Bill Summers – additional percussion

Featured guests

- Johnny Adams – additional vocal ("Trust in My Love" and "Heaven and Earth")
- Sonny Landreth – National steel guitar, slide guitar ("Home of the Blues")
- Huey Lewis – harmonica ("Stop Runnin' from Your Shadow")
- Bonnie Raitt – additional vocal ("Somebody Was Watching Over Me")
- Mavis Staples – additional vocal ("Brotherly Love" and "Well, Well, Well")

Background vocals

- Benita Arterberry, Lady Bianca, Don Bryant, Lucy Anna Burnett, Jon Cleary, Charlene Howard, Jenni Muldaur, Tracy Nelson, Charles Neville, Ann Peebles, Mavis Staples, Alisa Yarbrough
