= Robert Pete Williams =

American singer-songwriter (1914–1980)

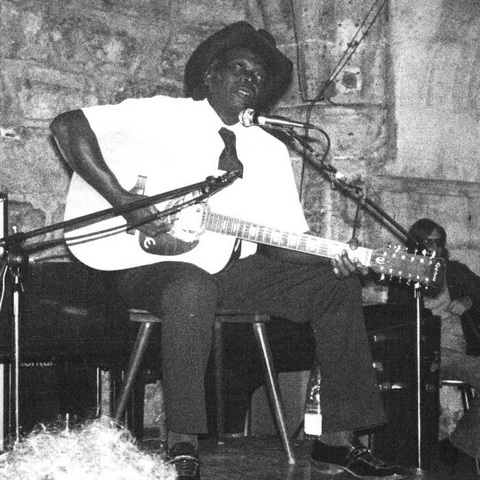
- Williams in 1979

Background information
- Born: Robert Pete Williams; March 14, 1914; Zachary, Louisiana, U.S.
- Died: December 31, 1980 (aged 66) Rosedale, Louisiana, U.S.
- Genres: Louisiana blues
- Occupations: Musician; songwriter
- Instruments: Vocals; guitar
- Years active: Late 1950s–1980
- Labels: Arhoolie; Sonet; Takoma Records

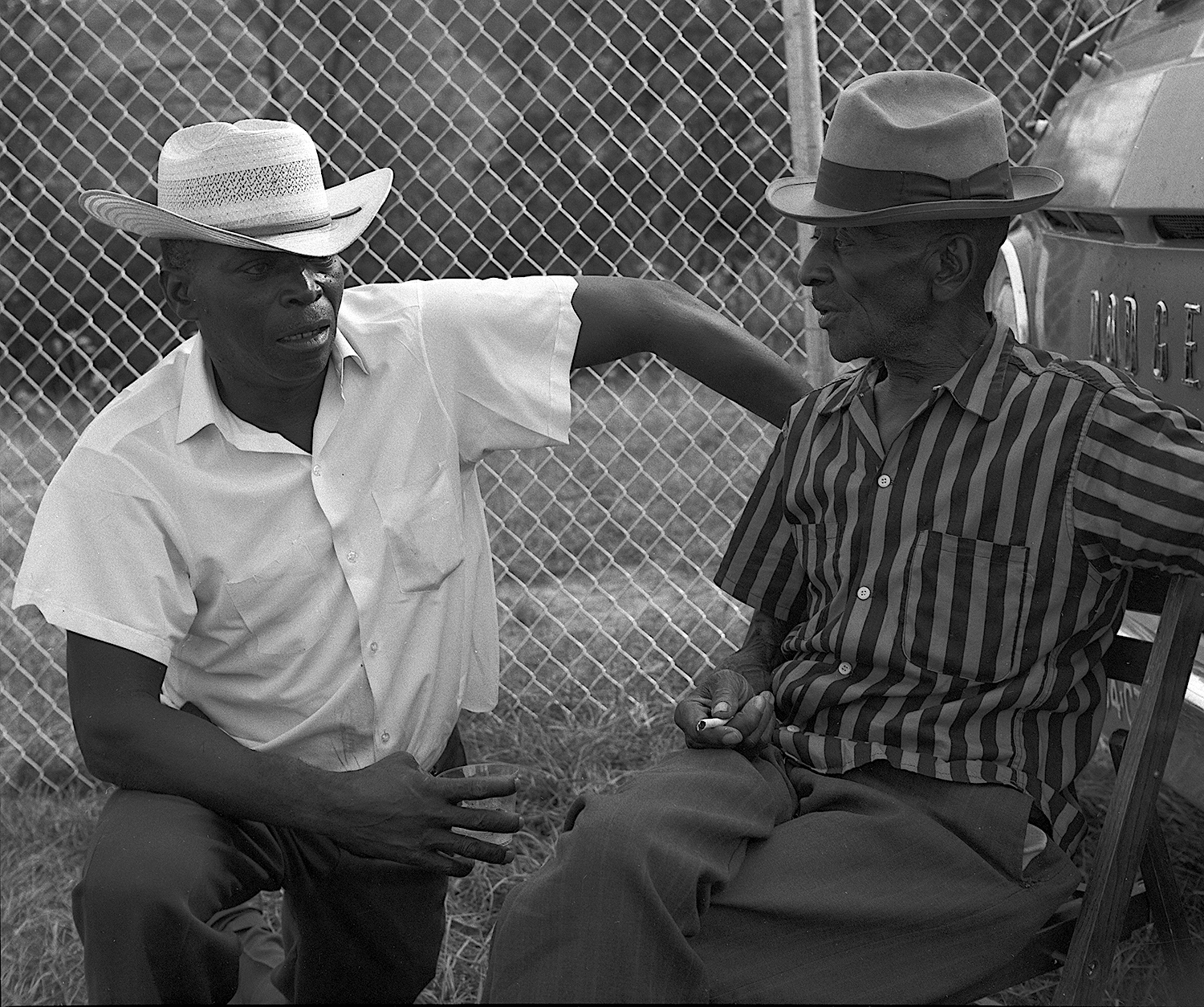
Robert Pete Williams (L) with Mance Lipscomb (R) at the 1970 Ann Arbor Blues Festival

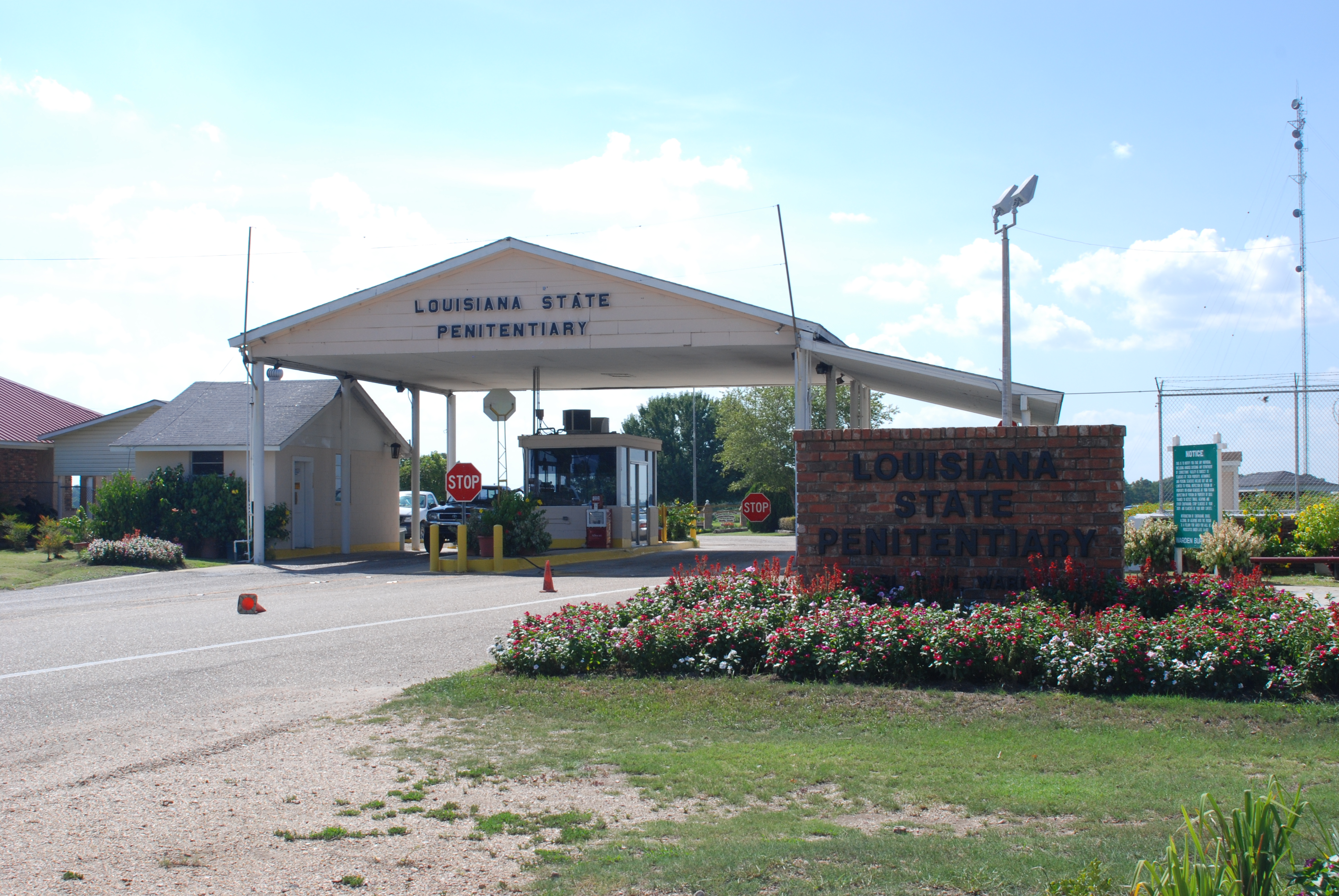
Louisiana State Penitentiary

Robert Pete Williams (March 14, 1914 – December 31, 1980) was an American Louisiana blues musician. His music characteristically employed unconventional structures and guitar tunings, and his songs are often about the time he served in prison. His song "I've Grown So Ugly" has been covered by Captain Beefheart, on his album Safe as Milk (1967), and by The Black Keys, on Rubber Factory (2004).

== Biography ==
Williams was born in Zachary, Louisiana, to a family of sharecroppers. He had no formal schooling, and spent his childhood picking cotton and cutting sugar cane. In 1928, he moved to Baton Rouge, Louisiana and worked in a lumberyard. At the age of 20, Williams fashioned a crude guitar by attaching five copper strings to a cigar box, and soon after bought a cheap, mass-produced one. Williams was taught by Frank and Robert Metty, and was at first chiefly influenced by Peetie Wheatstraw and Blind Lemon Jefferson. He began to play for small events such as Church gatherings, fish fries, suppers, and dances. From the 1930s to the 1950s, Williams played music and continued to work in the lumberyards of Baton Rouge.

He was discovered by folklorists Dr Harry Oster and Richard Allen in Louisiana State Penitentiary, where he was serving a life sentence for fatally shooting a man in a nightclub in 1956, an act which he claimed was in self-defense. Oster and Allen recorded Williams performing several of his songs about prison life, and pleaded for him to be pardoned. Under pressure from Oster, the parole board issued a pardon, and commuted his sentence to 12 years. In December 1958, he was released into 'servitude parole', which required 80 hours of labor per week on a Denham Springs farm without due compensation, and only room and board provided. This parole prevented him from working in music, though he was able to occasionally play with Butch Cage and Willie B. Thomas at Thomas's home in Zachary. By this time, Williams' music was becoming popular, and he played at the 1964 Newport Folk Festival.

By 1965, he was able to tour the country, traveling to Los Angeles, Massachusetts, Chicago and Berkeley, California. In 1966 he also toured Europe. In 1968 he settled in Maringouin, west of Baton Rouge and began to work outside of music.

In 1970, Williams began to perform once again, in cofeehouses, concerts, and in blues and folk festivals throughout the United States and Europe, including at the renowned 1970 Ann Arbor Blues Festival. His music has appeared in several films notably, the Roots of American Music; Country and Urban Music (1971); Out of the Blacks into the Blues (1972) and Blues Under the Skin (1972) the last two being French-made films.

His most popular recordings included "Prisoner's Talking Blues" and "Pardon Denied Again". Williams has been inducted into the Louisiana Blues Hall of Fame. In 2014, he was inducted into the Blues Hall of Fame.

Williams reduced his activities by the late 1970s, and died in Rosedale, Louisiana on December 31, 1980.

== Discography ==
- Angola Prisoner's Blues (Louisiana Folklore Society LFS A-3, Collector JGN 1003, reissued Arhoolie 2011), recorded 1959, includes three tracks by Williams
- Those Prison Blues (Folk-Lyric FL-109), recorded 1959 - reissued in 1971 (Arhoolie 2015) with altered track listing
- Free Again (Bluesville BVLP 1026), recorded 1961
- Louisiana Blues (Takoma b-1011), recorded 1966
- Robert Pete Williams (Ahura Mazda AMS 2002), recorded 1970
- When I Lay My Burden Down (Southland SLP-4), recorded 1971
- Sugar Farm Blues (Blues Beacon 1932), recorded 1972
- Robert Pete Williams with Big Joe Williams (Storyville SLP 225), recorded 1972, includes three tracks with Big Joe Williams on kazoo
- Legacy of the Blues Vol. 9 (Sonet 649), 1973
- Santa Fe Blues (Paris Album DISCODIS), 1979
- Ferraillages (Spalax 6.818), 1980 with Dick Annegarn
- Poor Bob's Blues (Arhoolie 2004 ARHCD 511), recorded 1959–1980, Folk-Lyric label

== Sources ==
- Baton Rouge Blues: A Guide to the Baton Rouge Bluesmen and Their Music by Jimmy Beyer, 1980. Publisher: Arts and Humanities Council of Greater Baton Rouge, ASIN: B0006E5DPW
