= Southland of the Heart =

Studio album by Maria Muldaur
- Released: 1998
- Genre: Blues
- Label: Telarc

Maria Muldaur chronology
Fanning the Flames (1996)	Southland of the Heart (1998)	Swingin' in the Rain (Classic Swing Tunes for Kids of All Ages) (1998)

Southland of the Heart is an album by the American musician Maria Muldaur, released in 1998. Muldaur supported the album with a North American tour that included shows with Dan Hicks. Muldaur considered the material to be "adult love songs."

== Production ==
The album was recorded in Los Angeles. Muldaur took guidance from Bonnie Raitt, who encouraged her to record songs she liked, rather than worry about thematic unity. Memphis Minnie remained a key influence on Muldaur. Hutch Hutchinson played bass on the album. "Someday When We're Both Alone" was written by Greg Brown. The title track was written by Bruce Cockburn; Muldaur chose it after hearing it on a mixtape given to her by a friend. Muldaur thought that "Latersville" was a topical update of her biggest hit, "Midnight at the Oasis".

== Critical reception ==
Professional ratings
Review scores
Source	Rating
AllMusic	3/5 stars
DownBeat	3.5/5 stars
The Tampa Tribune	3/4 stars

The Washington Post wrote that "Muldaur makes the most of the lyrics and frequently surrounds herself with musicians who share her affection for slippery guitar lines and languid R&B grooves." The Tallahassee Democrat concluded that "the lilting innocence and playful sensuality of her earlier sound is seasoned with warmth and a thrilling, husky timbre that makes Muldaur a natural blues diva." The San Diego Union-Tribune determined that "Muldaur has a smoldering, unchallenged way of easing through songs that wind up searing us emotionally."

The Arkansas Democrat-Gazette praised Muldaur's "superb and expressive voice on upbeat romps and moving ballads." The Tampa Tribune stated that "Muldaur's intimate, raspy voice and casual aplomb give the disc an irresistible quality." The Trenton Times deemed the album an "embracing new collection of warm and soulful Southern comfort blues."

AllMusic wrote that, "while her take on the genre isn't bad, Muldaur's voice has a limited range."

== Track listing ==
No.	Title	Length
1.	"Ring Me Up"
2.	"Get Up, Get Ready"
3.	"Southland of the Heart"
4.	"Latersville"
5.	"Think About You"
6.	"There's a Devil on the Loose"
7.	"Fool's Paradise"
8.	"One Short Life"
9.	"If I Were You"
10.	"Someday When We're Both Alone"
11.	"Blues Gives a Lesson"

== Credits ==
- Maria Muldaur – vocals
- Marty Grebb – vocals, tenor & baritone saxophones, piano
- John Woodhead – guitar, slide guitar
- Cranston Clements – guitar
- Joe Sublett – tenor saxophone
- Darrell Leonard – trumpet
- Mike Thompson – keyboards
- James "Hutch" Hutchinson – bass
- Lee Spath – drums
- Brad Dutz – percussion
- Brenda Burns – background vocals
- Joe Chambers – background vocals
- Willie Chambers – background vocals
- Pops Chambers – background vocals
