= Free Again (Robert Pete Williams album) =

Studio album by Robert Pete Williams
- Released: July 1961
- Recorded: November 14, 1960
- Studios: Baton Rouge, Louisiana and Denham Springs, Louisiana
- Genre: Blues
- Length: 45:11
- Labels: Bluesville; BVLP 1026
- Producer: Kenneth S. Goldstein

Robert Pete Williams chronology
Those Prison Blues (1959)	Free Again (1961)	Louisiana Blues (1966)

Free Again is an album by the blues musician Robert Pete Williams recorded in 1960 and released on the Bluesville label in July the following year.

== Reception ==
Professional ratings
Review scores
Source	Rating
AllMusic	4/5 stars
The Penguin Guide to Blues Recordings	4/4 stars

AllMusic stated: "Despite the constant, restless movement of Williams' guitar lines, these recordings have a stillness to them, as if the reverberation of his blunt, heavy attack might be the only sound for miles around. Intimately recorded by Oster himself, these ten solo guitar and vocal performances represent some of the finest of Williams' career and some of the best the blues has to offer".

== Track listing ==
All compositions by Robert Pete Williams except where noted

1. "Free Again" – 5:03
2. "Almost Dead Blues" – 4:05
3. "Rolling Stone" (Traditional) – 4:49
4. "Two Wings" – 4:50
5. "A Thousand Miles from Nowhere" – 5:17
6. "Thumbing a Ride" – 4:38
7. "I've Grown So Ugly" – 2:50
8. "Death Blues" – 5:16
9. "Hobo Worried Blues" – 4:10
10. "Hay Cutting Song" – 4:13

== Personnel ==
=== Performance ===
- Robert Pete Williams – guitar, vocals

=== Production ===
- Kenneth S. Goldstein – producer
- Harry Oster – engineer
