= Tribal (Dr. John album) =

Studio album by Dr. John and the Lower 911
- Released: August 3, 2010
- Studios: Dockside Studio (Maurice, LA); Quad Recording Studios (New York, NY); The Music Shed (New Orleans, LA)
- Genre: Blues
- Length: 1:03:23
- Label: 429
- Producers: Dr. John; Herman Ernest III

Dr. John chronology
| City That Care Forgot (2008) | Tribal (2010) | Locked Down (2012) |

Dr. John and the Lower 911 chronology
| City That Care Forgot (2008) | Tribal (2010) |

Tribal is the second and final studio album by American musician Dr. John and his band the Lower 911. It was released on August 3, 2010, through 429 Records. The recording sessions took place at Dockside Studio in Maurice, with additional recording at The Music Shed in New Orleans and Quad Recording Studios in New York City. The album was produced by Herman Ernest III, Dr. John, Chris Finney, and James Lemkin. The album is dedicated to the memory of Bobby Charles.

In 2011, at the 53rd Annual Grammy Awards, the album was nominated for a Grammy Award for Best Contemporary Blues Album, but lost to Buddy Guy's Living Proof.

== Critical reception ==
Professional ratings
Aggregate scores
| Source | Rating |
|---|---|
| Metacritic | 79/100 |
Review scores
| Source | Rating |
| All About Jazz | 5/5 stars |
| AllMusic | 4.5/5 stars |
| Entertainment Weekly | B+ |
| Los Angeles Times | 3/4 stars |
| PopMatters | 6/10 |
| Record Collector | 4/5 stars |

Tribal was met with generally favorable reviews from music critics. At Metacritic, which assigns a normalized rating out of 100 to reviews from mainstream publications, the album received an average score of 79, based on eight reviews.

AllMusic's Thom Jurek called the album "isn't just a logical follow-up to 2008's excellent The City That Care Forgot, it's close to a career-defining summation from one of America's most important musicians". Tom Sinclair of Entertainment Weekly wrote: "at times, the doctor and his new band sound oddly akin to Steely Dan in a mellow mood, with lyrics only a tad less literary than that group's". Randy Lewis of Los Angeles Times wrote: "sometimes the message overwhelms the music, but largely the good doctor tends to the sick without letting the well-heeled off the hook".

Jonathan Kosakow of PopMatters wrote: "the poignant lyrical message conveyed through most of the album, coupled with the ability of the music to keep you uplifted, is perfectly reminiscent of the spirit of New Orleans. Even though times could be better, there is always a reason to go on".

== Track listing ==
| No. | Title | Length |
|---|---|---|
| 1. | "Feel Good Music" | 3:28 |
| 2. | "Lissen at Our Prayer" | 4:03 |
| 3. | "Big Gap" | 4:43 |
| 4. | "Change of Heart" | 3:41 |
| 5. | "When I'm Right (I'm Wrong)" | 4:15 |
| 6. | "Jinky Jinx" | 3:25 |
| 7. | "Manoovas" | 4:07 |
| 8. | "Tribal" | 6:52 |
| 9. | "Music Came" | 4:10 |
| 10. | "Them" | 3:18 |
| 11. | "Only in Amerika" | 3:10 |
| 12. | "Whut's wit Dat" | 4:33 |
| 13. | "Potnah" | 4:18 |
| 14. | "A Place in the Sun" | 4:16 |
| 15. | "Sleepin' in My Bed" | 5:38 |
| Total length: | | 1:03:23 |

== Personnel ==
- Guitar: John Fohl, Derek Trucks
- Bass: David Barard
- Drums: Herman "Roscoe" Ernest III
- Percussion: Herman "Roscoe" Ernest, Kenneth "Afro" Williams
- Keyboards: Dr. John, Marcel Richardson
- Saxophone: Carl Blouin, Alonzo Bowens, Donald Harrison
- Strings: Natalia Casante, Helen Gillet, Harry Hardin, Lauren Lemmler
- Horns: Charlie Miller, Mark Mullins
- Backing Vocals: Elaine Foster, Erica Falls, Lisa Foster, Charla Herman, Lulu Siker

== Charts ==
| Chart (2010) | Peak position |
|---|---|
| UK Jazz & Blues Albums (Official Charts) | 19 |
