= True Believer (Irma Thomas album) =

Studio album by Irma Thomas
- Released: 1992
- Genres: Soul, R&B
- Label: Rounder
- Producers: Scott Billington, Irma Thomas

Irma Thomas chronology
Live: Simply the Best (1991)	True Believer (1992)	Time Is on My Side: The Best of Irma Thomas Volume 1 (1992)

True Believer is an album by the American soul singer Irma Thomas, released in 1992. It was Thomas's fourth album for Rounder Records.

== Production ==
Recorded in New Orleans, the album was produced by Scott Billington and Thomas. The song "I Never Fool Nobody But Me" was cowritten by Thomas and Dr. John. Doc Pomus and Allen Toussaint also contributed songs to True Believer. "Big Talk" was Thomas's attempt at a reggae number.

== Critical reception ==
Professional ratings
Review scores
Source	Rating
AllMusic	4.5/5 stars
Boston Herald	A−
Chicago Tribune	2.5/4 stars
The Encyclopedia of Popular Music	3/5 stars
MusicHound R&B: The Essential Album Guide	4/5 stars
(The New) Rolling Stone Album Guide	3/5 stars

The Christian Science Monitor thought that Thomas's "honey-smooth voice mixes with her conviction and energy on True Believer to produce a richer and more consistent sound than on any previous effort." The New York Times praised the "smooth funk" and "New Orleans bop." The Toronto Star wrote that the singer "patrols the smooth end of the blues genre, ranging through gospel and r&b too, with a tight band, strong pianist David Torkanowsky and a blasting horn section."

The Washington Post concluded that, "when Thomas sings [Dan] Penn's 'Smoke Filled Room' or Pomus's 'I Never Fool Nobody But Me' or Johnny Neel's 'Can't You Hear It in My Tears', the anguish and self-doubt she feels is nearly palpable—a sharp contrast to the songs of love, affirmation and inspiration that dot the album as well and reveal another side of Thomas's compelling vocal personality." The Chicago Tribune determined that Thomas "apparently wants to be taken seriously as a pop diva, and such carefully polished material as 'Trying to Catch a Cab in the Rain' and 'Smoke Filled Room', with their meticulously crafted choruses and slickly cascading arrangements, might do the trick."

AllMusic called the album "a stellar collection of contemporary soul performed in the classic '50s New Orleans tradition."

== Track listing ==
1. "Trying to Catch a Cab in the Rain" (Dan Penn, Jon Tiven, Sally Tiven)
2. "Can't You Hear It in My Tears" (Johnny Neel, Tommy Polk)
3. "I Never Fool Nobody but Me" (Dr. John, Doc Pomus)
4. "Smoke-Filled Room" (Jonnie Barnett, Dan Penn, Carson Whitsett)
5. "Big Talk" (Ken Hirsch, Mark Mueller)
6. "Chains of Love" (Ahmet Ertegun, Harry Van Walls)
7. "Heart Full of Rain" (Michael Dan Ehmig, Tony Joe White)
8. "Sweet Touch of Love" (Allen Toussaint)
9. "I'll Be Satisfied" (Billy Davis, Berry Gordy Jr., Gwen Gordy Fuqua
10. "True Believer" (Daryl Burgess)

== Personnel ==
- Guitar: Cranston Clements
- Bass: Chris Severin
- Keyboards: Sammy Berfect, David Torkanowsky
- Drums: Herman "Roscoe" Ernest III
- Saxophone: Amadee Castenell, Bill Samuel
- Horns: Chris Belleau, Charles Elam III, Frank Parker, A. J. Pittman
- Backing vocals: Pamela Landrum, Earl J. Smith, Earl "Chinna" Smith
