= Night People (Lee Dorsey album) =

Studio album by Lee Dorsey
- Released: 1978
- Genres: R&B, soul, rock and roll
- Label: ABC
- Producer: Allen Toussaint

Lee Dorsey chronology
Yes We Can (1970)	Night People (1978)	All Ways Funky (1982)

Night People is an album by the American musician Lee Dorsey, released in 1978. It was Dorsey's final studio album, although a few country-influenced tunes were recorded before his death in 1986.

Although the album failed to chart, the title track peaked at No. 93 on the Billboard Hot Soul Singles chart.

== Production ==
The album was produced by Allen Toussaint, with whom Dorsey had collaborated many times over the years. Toussaint also wrote the album's songs. The producer used Chocolate Milk, a New Orleans band, as Dorsey's backup musicians. Irma Thomas provided backing vocals.

== Critical reception ==
Professional ratings
Review scores
Source	Rating
AllMusic	3.5/5 stars
Robert Christgau	A−
DownBeat	3.5/5 stars
The Encyclopedia of Popular Music	2/5 stars
MusicHound R&B: The Essential Album Guide	2/5 stars

Robert Christgau deemed the album "astonishingly listenable," writing that "Dorsey's subtle, small-scale rock and roll genre statement defines songwriter-producer Toussaint better than Toussaint the performer ever has." Texas Monthly called the title track "a mad celebration of soul-stomping, pressure-cooking Crescent City spirit." High Fidelity wrote that "Dorsey is in fine shape for the bouncy, frequently humorous songs." The Gazette said that "the instrumentation is lively, brassy, and Dorsey's sophisticated soul vocalese shines bright."

AllMusic called the album "a shade too slick, with hints of disco and a couple of rare mawkish misfires by Allen Toussaint."

== Track listing ==
No.	Title	Length
1.	"Say It Again"	2:56
2.	"God Must Have Blessed America"	3:37
3.	"Soul Mine"	3:59
4.	"Keep on Doing It to Me"	3:07
5.	"Thank You"	3:24
6.	"Night People"	4:20
7.	"Can I Be the One"	4:33
8.	"Babe"	3:48
9.	"Draining"	4:24

== Personnel ==
- Guitar: Steve Hughes, Daryl Johnson, Eugene Synegal
- Bass: David Barard
- Keyboards: James Booker, Robert Dabon, Marcel Richardson, Allen Toussaint
- Drums: Herman "Roscoe" Ernest III, Kim Joseph, Dwight Richards, Kenneth "Afro" Williams
- Saxophone: Amadee Castenell
- Trumpet: Joe "Fox" Smith
- Backing vocals: Linda Castle, Joan Harman, Frank Hogan, Hattie Joseph, Sharon Nabonne, Irma Thomas
