= Louisiana Love Call =

Studio album by Maria Muldaur
- Released: 1992
- Recorded: Ultrasonic Studio, New Orleans
- Genre: Louisiana blues
- Length: 53:11
- Label: Black Top Records
- Producer: Hammond Scott

Maria Muldaur chronology
Transblucency (1986)	Louisiana Love Call (1992)	Meet Me at Midnite (1994)

Louisiana Love Call is a 1992 studio album by Maria Muldaur. The album was her debut for Black Top Records and was recorded at Ultrasonic Studio in New Orleans. A homage to Crescent City soul, the album featured a host of New Orleans musicians including David Torkanowsky, Cranston Clements, Herman Ernest and Dr. John. The title track features a duet with Aaron Neville.

Professional ratings
Review scores
Source	Rating
AllMusic	3.5/5 stars
Entertainment Weekly	B
Rolling Stone	3.5/5 stars

The album received a number of positive reviews. Rolling Stone declared it as "the best recording of [her] career". Louisiana Love Call was remastered and re-released by Shout Factory in 2005.

== Track listing ==
No.	Title	Writer(s)	Length
1.	"Second Line"	Jon Cleary	4:18
2.	"Best of Me"	Marty Grebb	4:33
3.	"Louisiana Love Call"	Marty Grebb	5:11
4.	"Cajun Moon"	J. J. Cale	4:55
5.	"Creole Eyes"	Richard Vito	4:15
6.	"Blues Wave"	Nick Daniels	3:25
7.	"Dem Dat Know"	Bobby Charles; Marty Grebb	5:18
8.	"So Many Rivers to Cross"	Daniel Moore; Jodi Siegel	3:58
9.	"Don't You Feel My Leg (Don't You Get Me High)"	Louisa "Blue Lu" Barker; Danny Barker; Ken Harrison	4:05
10.	"Layin Right Here in Heaven"	Leon Russell	4:40
11.	"Without a Friend Like You"	Ronnie Earl; Darrell Nulisch; Hubert Sumlin	3:41
12.	"Southern Music"	Russell Smith	4:52
Total length:			53:11

== Personnel ==
- Guitar – Cranston Clements, Amos Garrett
- Bass – Chris Severin
- Keyboards – Dr. John, David Torkanowsky
- Accordion – Zachary Richard
- Drums – Herman "Roscoe" Ernest III
- Percussion – Alfred "Uganda" Roberts, Kenneth Williams
- Harmonica – Laurence Jacobs
- Saxophone – Mark "Kaz" Kazanoff, Charles Neville, Ernest Youngblood Jr.
- Trumpet – Jamil Sharif
- Backing Vocals – Lucy Burnett, Phillip Manuel, Aaron Neville, Charles Neville
