= Out of Nowhere (Snooks Eaglin album) =

Studio album by Snooks Eaglin
- Released: 1989
- Genre: Blues
- Label: Black Top
- Producer: Hammond Scott

Snooks Eaglin chronology
Baby, You Can Get Your Gun! (1987)	Out of Nowhere (1989)	Teasin' You (1992)

Out of Nowhere is an album by the American musician Snooks Eaglin, released in 1989. It was his second album for Black Top Records.

== Production ==
The album was produced by Hammond Scott. Eaglin included covers of songs by Tommy Ridgley, Smiley Lewis, and Benny Spellman. "It's Your Thing" is a cover of the Isley Brothers song. "You're So Fine" is a version of the Falcons song. "Wella Wella Baby-La" was written by Nappy Brown. The title track, a jazz standard, is an instrumental. "Cheeta" is an original novelty song. Ronnie Earl and Anson Funderburgh played guitar on the album. Grady Gaines played saxophone.

== Critical reception ==
Professional ratings
Review scores
Source	Rating
AllMusic	4/5 stars
Chicago Tribune	3.5/4 stars
The Cincinnati Enquirer	3/5 stars
The Cincinnati Post	4/5 stars
Lincoln Journal Star	B
The Philadelphia Inquirer	2.5/4 stars
The Rolling Stone Album Guide	3.5/5 stars
The Virgin Encyclopedia of R&B and Soul	3/5 stars

The Chicago Tribune noted that the album's styles "are often only preserved now as museum pieces, but Eaglin brings them alive with all their original spirit and spunk." The New York Times wrote that Out of Nowhere "is filled with his off-kilter, eccentric soloing and perfect New Orleans voice." The St. Petersburg Times determined that Eaglin's "eclectic tastes match his offbeat guitar style, which incorporates grungy, bar-band riffing, staccato-studded solos and Wes Montgomery-inspired licks." The Washington Post concluded that, "even when his cover versions fall short of the original recordings here, you can't help but be charmed by his exuberant personality, stylistic range and quirky guitar."

== Track listing ==
No.	Title	Length
1.	"Oh Lawdy, My Baby"
2.	"Lipstick Traces"
3.	"Young Girl"
4.	"Out of Nowhere"
5.	"You're So Fine"
6.	"Mailman Blues"
7.	"Wella Wella Baby-La"
8.	"Kiss of Fire"
9.	"It's Your Thing"
10.	"Playgirl"
11.	"West Side Baby"
12.	"Cheeta"
