= Anutha Zone =

1998 studio album by American singer Dr. John

Studio album by Dr. John
- Released: August 11, 1998
- Recorded: 1998
- Studios: Avatar Studios, Manhattan, New York City; Abbey Road Studios, London
- Genres: Rock; gospel
- Length: 56:49
- Label: Parlophone
- Producer: John Leckie

Dr. John chronology
Afterglow (1995)	Anutha Zone (1998)	Duke Elegant (1999)

Anutha Zone is the 21st studio album by American singer-songwriter Dr. John. The album was released on August 11, 1998, by Parlophone.

The album was recorded with contributions by Dr. John's regular touring band at the time and features guest performances of Carleen Anderson and Paul Weller as well as rhythm section work by members of Spiritualized, Portishead, and Supergrass.

Professional ratings
Review scores
Source	Rating
AllMusic	4/5 stars
Rolling Stone	3/5 stars

== Track listing ==
All tracks composed by Mac Rebennack, except where noted.

No.	Title	Writer(s)	Length
1.	"Zonata"		0:46
2.	"Ki Ya Gris Gris"		4:04
3.	"Voices in My Head"		4:33
4.	"Hello God"		4:37
5.	"John Gris"		5:20
6.	"Party Hellfire"	Mac Rebennack, Cat Yellen	4:41
7.	"I Don't Wanna Know"	John Martyn	3:23
8.	"Anutha Zone"	Mac Rebennack, Cat Yellen	3:58
9.	"I Like Ki Yoka"		3:44
10.	"The Olive Tree"	Mac Rebennack, Cat Yellen	3:48
11.	"Why Come?"	Mac Rebennack, Cat Yellen	3:42
12.	"Soulful Warrior"	Mac Rebennack, Cat Yellen	4:09
13.	"The Stroke"		4:15
14.	"Sweet Home New Orleans"		5:49
Total length:			56:49

== Personnel ==
- Guitar: Bobby Broom, Gaz Coombes, Matt Deighton, Paul Weller
- Slide Guitar: Hugh McCracken, Mike Mooney
- Mandolin: Hugh McCracken
- Bass: David Barard, Sean Cook, Damon Minchella, Mick Quinn
- Keyboards: Martin Duffy, Thighpaulsandra, Jason Pierce, Jools Holland
- Drums: Clive Deamer, Herman "Roscoe" Ernest III, Damon Reece, Steve White
- Percussion: Sammy Figueroa, Robin Jones, Steve Mason
- Berimbau: Ravi Freeman
- Saxophone: Ronnie Cuber, Ray Dickaty, Lawrence Feldman, Howard Johnson, Frank Vicari
- Horns: Clark Gayton, Tony Kadleck, Bobby Keys, The Kick Horns, Steve Madaio, Alan Rubin, Annie Whitehead
- Flute: Ray Dickaty
- Cor anglais: Shelley Woodworth
- Harmonica: Hugh McCracken
- Backing Vocals: Jenny Douglas, The London Community Gospel Choir, Katherine Russell
