= Darrell Leonard =

American musician

- Origin: United States
- Formerly of: Delaney & Bonnie & Friends, The Phantom Blues Band, The Texacali Horns

Darrell Leonard is an American, Los Angeles–based, trumpet player, composer and arranger. He recorded and toured with Delaney and Bonnie and Friends from 1970 through 1973.

== Background ==
He is a Grammy Award winner for his work with Taj Mahal and the Phantom Blues Band.

His work has been featured on recordings by Taj Mahal, Stevie Ray Vaughan, Buddy Guy, Keb' Mo, B. B. King, The Rolling Stones, Bonnie Raitt, Jimmy Smith, Percy Sledge, Barry Goldberg, Little Feat and Glenn Frey.

His compositions have been featured in the film The Divine Secrets of the Ya Ya Sisterhood and the Eric Simonson play Carter's Way.

== Career ==
Leonard played on Freddie King's Larger than Life album that was released on the RSO record label in 1976.

In 1982 Leonard was leading an ensemble which including himself was made up of sixteen musicians. Their performance was at the Trancus was reviewed by Randal A. Case in the 26 May - 9 June issue of Music Connection. The songs they covered was "Next to Last", "Green Onions" and "Don't Deceive Me". Case said that they were a skillful band, but they could further engrave on the audiences' minds with a higher utilization of lyrics.

Along with Joe Sublett, Leonard formed the Texacali Horns. The name was born when they worked on the 1989 Stevie Ray Vaughan album In Step.

They also played on five tracks on John Mayall's Wake Up Call album that was released in 1993.

Leonard and Sublett played on Maria Muldaur's 1998 Southland of the Heart album.
