= Duke Elegant =

Studio album by Dr. John
- Released: 1999
- Recorded: 1999
- Genre: Jazz
- Length: 66:38
- Label: Parlophone
- Producer: Mac Rebennack

Dr. John chronology
Anutha Zone (1998)	Duke Elegant (1999)	Creole Moon (2001)

Duke Elegant is a 1999 studio album by New Orleans keyboard player and vocalist Dr. John. The album was produced by the artist under his real name, Mac Rebennack, and is a collection of songs written or performed by Duke Ellington. It features musical support from "The Lower 9-11" (David Barard, Bobby Broom, and Herman "Roscoe" Ernest III), Ronnie Cuber, and Cyro Baptista.

== Track listing ==
The year each song was originally written is given with the composers' names.

1. "On The Wrong Side of the Railroad Tracks" (1947; [Doctor John) - 5:41
2. "I'm Gonna Go Fishin'" (1959; Duke Ellington, Peggy Lee) - 5:02
3. "It Don't Mean a Thing (If It Ain't Got That Swing)" (1932; Duke Ellington, Irving Mills) - 5:30
4. "Perdido" (1942; Ervin M. Drake, Hans Longsfolder, Juan Tizol) - 5:48
5. "Don't Get Around Much Anymore" (1942; Bob Russell, Duke Ellington) - 3:35
6. "Solitude" (1934; Duke Ellington, Eddie DeLango, Irving Mills) - 5:03
7. "Satin Doll" (1953; Billy Strayhorn, Johnny Mercer, Duke Ellington) - 4:44
8. "Mood Indigo" (1931; Irving Mills, Duke Ellington, Barnard Bigard) - 6:52
9. "Do Nothing 'Til You Hear From Me" (1943; Bob Russell, Duke Ellington) - 5:29
10. "Things Ain't What They Used To Be" (1942; Mercer Ellington) - 6:23
11. "Caravan" (1937; Juan Tizol, Irving Mills, Duke Ellington) - 6:22
12. "Flaming Sword" (1940; Duke Ellington) - 5:45

== Personnel ==
- Dr. John – piano, B3 organ, vocals
- Ronnie Cuber – saxophone
- Bobby Broom – guitar, backing vocals
- David Barard – bass, backing vocals
- Herman "Roscoe" Ernest III – drums, backing vocals
- Cyro Baptista – percussion
