= Lee Dorsey =

American pop and R&B singer (1924–1986)

- Dorsey in 1964

Background information
- Born: Irving Lee Dorsey; December 24, 1924; New Orleans, Louisiana, U.S.
- Died: December 1, 1986 (aged 61) New Orleans, Louisiana
- Genres: R&B, soul, funk
- Occupation: Singer
- Years active: 1950s–1986
- Labels: Fury, Amy, Polydor, ABC

Irving Lee Dorsey (December 24, 1924 – December 1, 1986) was an American pop and R&B singer during the 1960s. His biggest hits were "Ya Ya" (1961) and "Working in the Coal Mine" (1966). Much of his work was produced by Allen Toussaint, with instrumental backing provided by the Meters.

== Career ==
Born in New Orleans, Louisiana, Dorsey was a childhood friend of Fats Domino. He moved to Portland, Oregon when he was ten years old. He served in the United States Navy in World War II and began a career in prizefighting, boxing as a featherweight in Portland in the early 1950s. He fought under the name Kid Chocolate and was not successful, fighting only one time and being knocked out in the second round. He returned to New Orleans in 1955, where he opened an auto repair business as well as singing in clubs at night.

His first recording was "Rock Pretty Baby/Lonely Evening" on Cosimo Mattasa's Rex label, in 1958. This was followed by "Lottie Mo/Lover of Love", for the small Valiant label in late 1960 (picked up by ABC Paramount in 1961). These efforts were unsuccessful, but around 1960 he was discovered by A&R man Marshall Sehorn, who secured him a contract with Fury Records, owned by Bobby Robinson. After meeting songwriter and record producer Allen Toussaint at a party, he recorded "Ya Ya", a song inspired by a group of children chanting nursery rhymes. It went to number seven on the Billboard Hot 100 in 1961, sold over one million copies, and was awarded a gold disc. Although the follow-up "Do-Re-Mi" also made the charts, later releases on Fury were not successful. Dorsey returned to running his repair business, but also released singles on the Smash and Constellation labels in 1963 and 1964.

He was approached again by Toussaint, and recorded Toussaint's song "Ride Your Pony" for the Amy label, a subsidiary of Bell Records. The song reached No. 7 on the R&B chart in late 1965, and he followed it up with "Get Out of My Life, Woman", "Working in the Coal Mine" (his biggest pop hit) and "Holy Cow", all of which made the pop charts in both the US and the UK. Dorsey toured internationally, and also recorded an album with Toussaint, The New Lee Dorsey in 1966. In 1970 Dorsey and Toussaint collaborated on the album Yes We Can; the title song was Dorsey's last entry in the US singles chart. It was later a hit for the Pointer Sisters under the title, "Yes We Can Can". With declining sales, Dorsey returned to his auto repair business.

In 1976 Dorsey appeared on the album I Don't Want to Go Home by Southside Johnny and the Asbury Jukes, which led to more recordings on his own with ABC Records, including the album Night People. In 1980, he opened for English punk band The Clash on their US concert tour, and also toured in support of James Brown and Jerry Lee Lewis.

Dorsey developed emphysema and died on December 1, 1986, in New Orleans, at the age of 61.

== Discography ==
=== Studio albums ===
Year	Album	Peak chart positions		
Year	Album	US	US R&B	UK
1962	Ya! Ya!	—	—	—
1966	Ride Your Pony - Get Out of My Life Woman	—	—	—
1966	Working in the Coalmine - Holy Cow (The New Lee Dorsey)	129	13	27
1970	Yes We Can	—	—	—
1978	Night People	—	—	—
"—" denotes releases that did not chart.

=== Compilation albums ===
- Gonh Be Funky (1980)
- All Ways Funky (1982)
- Holy Cow! The Best of Lee Dorsey (1985)
- 20 Greatest Hits (1991)
- Golden Classics (1994)
- Wheelin' and Dealin' - The Definitive Collection (1997)
- Holy Cow: The Very Best of Lee Dorsey (2005)
- The Best of Lee Dorsey (2006)

=== Singles ===
Year	Single	Chart positions			Album
Year	Single	US Pop	US R&B	UK	Album
1959	"Rock" b/w "Lonely Evening" (Non-album track)	—	—	—	Non-album tracks
1961	"Lover of Love" b/w "Lottie-Mo"	—	—	—	Non-album tracks
1961	"Ya Ya" b/w "Give Me You"	7	1	—	Ya! Ya!
1961	"Rock" b/w "Lonely Evening" (Non-album track); Second standard pressing	—	—	—	Non-album tracks
1961	"Do-Re-Mi" b/w "People Gonna Talk"	27	22	—	Ya! Ya!
1962	"Eenie-Meenie-Minee-Mo" b/w "Behind the 8-Ball"	—	—	—	Ya! Ya!
1962	"You Are My Sunshine" b/w "Give Me Your Love"	—	—	—	Non-album tracks
1963	"Hoodlum Joe" b/w "When I Met My Baby"	—	—	—	Non-album tracks
1963	"Hello Good Looking" b/w "Someday"	—	—	—	Non-album tracks
1964	"Organ Grinder Swing" b/w "I Gotta Find a New Love"	—	—	—	Non-album tracks
1964	"You're Breaking Me Up" b/w "Messed Around (and Fell in Love)"	—	—	—	Non-album tracks
1965	"Ride Your Pony" b/w "The Kitty Cat Song"	28	7	—	Ride Your Pony - Get Out of My Life Woman
1965	"Work, Work, Work" b/w "Can You Hear Me"	121	—	—	Ride Your Pony - Get Out of My Life Woman
1966	"Get Out of My Life, Woman" b/w "So Long"	44	5	22	Ride Your Pony - Get Out of My Life Woman
1966	"Confusion" b/w "Neighbor's Daughter"	—	—	38	The New Lee Dorsey
1966	"Working in the Coal Mine" b/w "Mexico"	8	5	8	The New Lee Dorsey
1966	"Holy Cow" b/w "Operation Heartache" (Non-album track)	23	10	6	The New Lee Dorsey
1967	"Rain Rain Go Away" b/w "Gotta Find a Job"	105	—	—	Non-album tracks
1967	"My Old Car" b/w "Why Wait Until Tomorrow"	97	—	—	Non-album tracks
1967	"Vista, Vista" b/w "I Can't Get Away"	—	—	—	Non-album tracks
1967	"Go-Go Girl" b/w "I Can Hear You Callin'"	62	31	—	Non-album tracks
1967	"Love Lots of Lovin'" b/w "Take Care of Our Love" (Non-album track); Both sides with Betty Harris	110	—	—	Holy Cow! The Best of Lee Dorsey
1968	"Cynthia" b/w "I Can't Get Away"	—	—	—	Non-album tracks
1968	"Wonder Woman" b/w "A Little Dab a Do Ya" (from The New Lee Dorsey)	—	—	—	Non-album tracks
1968	"Four Corners"—Part 1 b/w Part 2	—	—	—	Non-album tracks
1968	"I'm Gonna Sit Right Down and Write; Myself a Letter" b/w "Little Ba-by"	—	—	—	Non-album tracks
1969	"A Lover Was Born" b/w "What Now My Love"	—	—	—	Non-album tracks
1969	"Everything I Do Gonh Be Funky (From Now On)" b/w "There Should Be a Book" (Non-album track)	95	33	—	Holy Cow! The Best of Lee Dorsey
1969	"Give It Up" b/w "Candy Yam"	—	—	—	Non-album tracks
1970	"Yes We Can"—Part 1 b/w "O Me-O, My-O"	—	46	—	Yes We Can
1970	"What You Want (Is What You Get)" b/w "I Can Hear You Callin'"	—	—	—	Non-album tracks
1971	"Sneakin' Sally Through the Alley" b/w "Tears, Tears and More Tears"	—	—	—	Yes We Can
1971	"Tears, Tears and More Tears" b/w "Occapella"	—	—	—	Yes We Can
1972	"Freedom for the Stallion" b/w "If She Won't (Find Someone Who Will)"	—	—	—	Non-album tracks
1972	"When Can I Come Home" b/w "Gator Tail" (from Yes We Can)	—	—	—	Non-album tracks
1973	"On Your Way Down" b/w "Freedom for the Stallion"	—	—	—	Non-album tracks
1978	"Night People" b/w "Can I Be the One"	—	93	—	Night People
1978	"Say It Again" b/w "God Must Have Blessed America"	—	—	—	Night People
1980	"Hey Babe" b/w "Say It Again"	—	—	—	Night People
1982	"Draining" b/w "Soul Mine"	—	—	—	Night People
"—" denotes releases that did not chart or were not released in that territory.
