= Butch Cage and Willie B. Thomas =

Butch Cage (left) with Willie B. Thomas live at the Newport Music Festival in 1960.

James "Butch" Cage (March 16, 1894 – December 1975) and Willie B. Thomas (May 25, 1912 – November 23, 1977) were an American blues duo active from the 1940s to the early 1970s. Cage and Thomas were discovered in 1959 by musicologist Harry Oster, who promoted the two at the Newport Music Festival. Field recording with the duo conducted in the following year was praised for upholding pre-blues string band tradition.

Cage's first instrument was a cane fife, though later on he became a credible guitarist and an even more accomplished fiddle player. As a result of the destruction caused by the Great Mississippi Flood of 1927, Cage settled in Zachary, East Baton Rouge Parish, Louisiana, to work in a manufacturing factory and perform at social gatherings. Thomas was a factory janitor when he met Cage and previously worked as a waterboy. When he and his family moved to Zachary in 1925, Thomas was crushed by fallen furniture, causing a back injury which permanently disabled him and stunted his growth.

Thomas accompanied Cage with vocals and the kazoo for years before learning to play guitar. Playing as a duo and in string bands at social gatherings and church services, the two were discovered by musicologist Harry Oster in 1959. Cage and Thomas engaged in a set of field recordings with Oster, making them a rare exception among the Baton Rouge area musicians of string band tradition who went largely unrecorded. Fourteen of the duo's cuts appear on the 1961 album Country Negro Jam Sessions, which also features tracks by Robert Pete Williams, a guitarist who occasionally performed with Cage and Thomas. Oster thought highly of Cage, describing him as "a great representative of the now virtually extinct nineteenth century negro fiddle tradition".

In 1960, Cage and Thomas performed at the Newport Music Festival, while being positively received by an audience that, for the most part, had never heard the duo's style of music. They continued to play together until Cage's death in Zachary, in 1975. Their recordings were also released on Raise a Ruckus Tonight and Old Time Black Southern String Band Music. Thomas died on November 23, 1977, at Lane Memorial Hospital in Zachary.
