= Snooks Eaglin =

American musician (1936/37–2009)

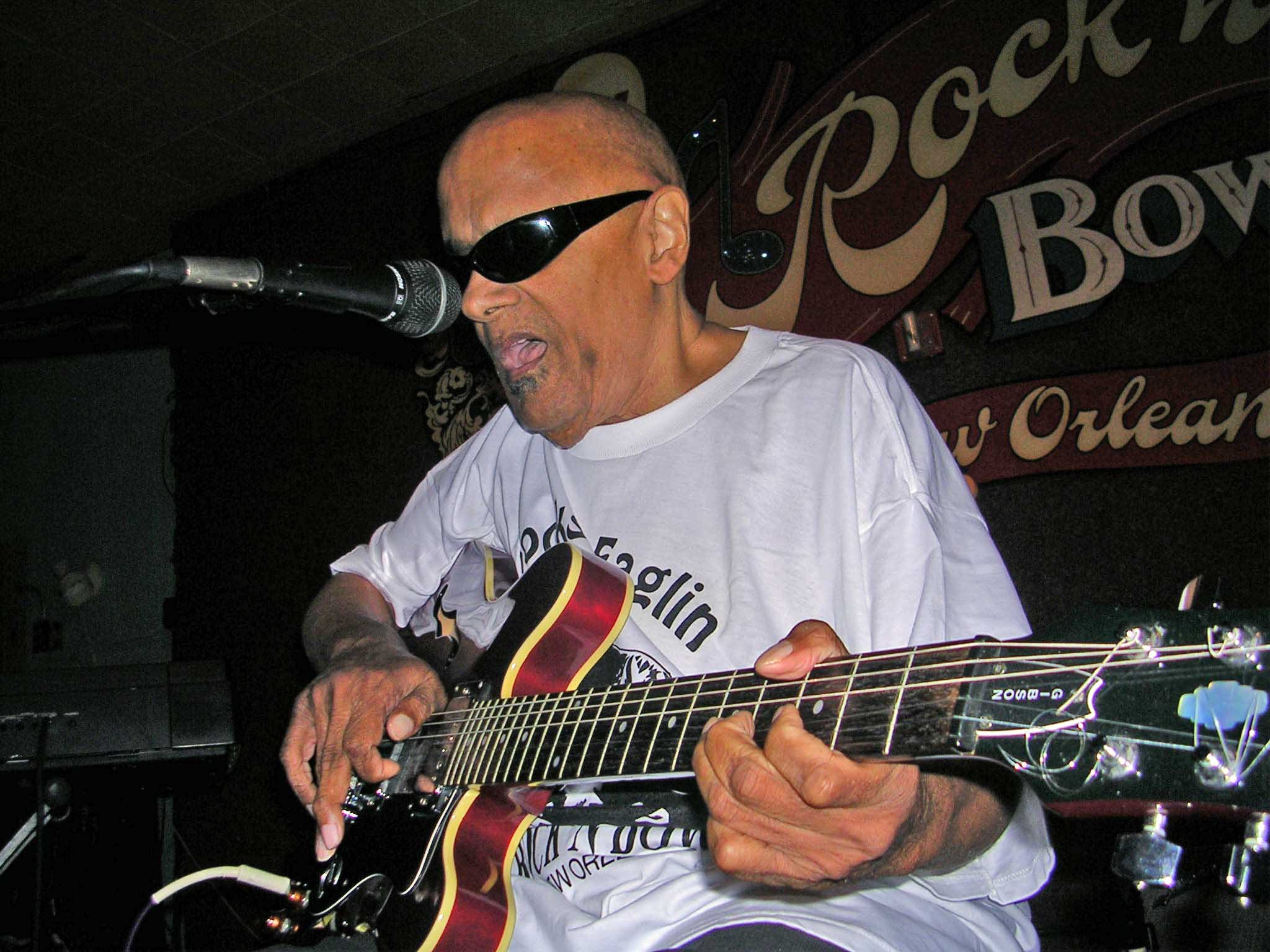
- Eaglin in 2006

Background information
- Born: Fird Eaglin Jr. January 21, 1937; New Orleans, Louisiana, U.S.
- Died: February 18, 2009 (aged 72) New Orleans, Louisiana, U.S.
- Genres: Blues
- Occupation: Musician
- Instruments: Vocals, guitar
- Years active: 1953–2008
- Labels: Money Pit, Black Top, various
- Formerly of: George Porter Jr. Jon Cleary; Allen Toussaint; Eddie Bo

Fird Eaglin Jr. (January 21, 1936 or 1937 – February 18, 2009), known as Snooks Eaglin, was an American guitarist and singer based in New Orleans. In his early years he was sometimes credited under other names, including Blind Snooks Eaglin, "Lil" Snook, Ford Eaglin, Blind Guitar Ferd.

His vocal style was reminiscent of that of Ray Charles; in the 1950s, when he was in his late teens, he sometimes billed himself as "Little Ray Charles". He played a wide range of styles of music within the same concert, album, or even song: blues, rock and roll, jazz, country, and Latin. In his early years, he also played acoustic blues.

His ability to play a wide range of songs and make them his own earned him the nickname "The Human Jukebox." Eaglin claimed in interviews that his musical repertoire included some 2,500 songs.

At live shows, he usually did not prepare set lists and was unpredictable, even to his bandmates. He played songs that came to him on stage, and he also took requests from the audience.

== Early life ==
Eaglin lost his sight not long after his first birthday, having been stricken with glaucoma, and spent several years in the hospital with other ailments. Around the age of five he received a guitar from his father and taught himself to play by listening to and playing along with the radio. A mischievous youngster, he was given the nickname "Snooks" after a radio character named Baby Snooks.

== Career ==
=== Early years ===
In 1947, at the age of 11, Eaglin entered a talent contest organized by the radio station WNOE and won it with his performance of "Twelfth Street Rag." Three years later, he dropped out of a school for the blind to become a professional musician. In 1952, he joined the Flamingoes, a local seven-piece band started by Allen Toussaint. The Flamingoes did not have a bass player, and according to Eaglin, he played both the guitar and the bass parts simultaneously on his guitar. He stayed with the Flamingoes for several years, until the group disbanded in the mid-1950s.

As a solo artist, his recording and touring were inconsistent, and for a man with a career of about 50 years, his discography is rather slim. His first recording was in 1953, playing guitar at a recording session for James "Sugar Boy" Crawford.

The first recordings under his own name were made by Harry Oster, a folklorist from Louisiana State University, who found Eaglin playing in the streets of New Orleans and recorded him in seven sessions between 1958 and 1960. For these recordings, Eaglin played in a country blues style, accompanying himself on an acoustic guitar, without a band. These recordings were later released by several labels, including Folkways, Folk-Lyric, and Prestige/Bluesville.

=== 1960s and 1970s ===
From 1960 to 1963, Eaglin recorded for Imperial. He played electric guitar in sessions for Imperial, with backup from a band including James Booker on piano and Smokey Johnson on drums. He recorded 26 tracks for Imperial (available on The Complete Imperial Recordings), many of which were songs written by Dave Bartholomew. Unlike the Harry Oster recordings, these works on Imperial are New Orleans R&B in the style for which he is widely known today. After Imperial, in 1964, he recorded alone at his home with a guitar for the Swedish Broadcasting Corporation; these recordings were released on the album I Blueskvarter 1964: Vol. 3. For the remainder of the 1960s, he apparently made no recordings.

His next recorded work was for the Swedish label Sonet in 1971. Another album, Down Yonder, with Ellis Marsalis on piano, was released in 1978. Apart from his own work, Eaglin took part in recording sessions with Professor Longhair in 1971 and 1972 (released on the album Mardi Gras in Baton Rouge). He also played guitar on the first album by the Wild Magnolias, recorded in 1973.

=== Black Top and later years ===
Eaglin joined Nauman and Hammond Scott of Black Top Records in the 1980s and obtained a recording contract with the label. Eaglin's years with Black Top were the most consistent years of his recording career. Between 1987 and 1999, he recorded four studio albums and a live album and appeared as a guest on a number of recordings by other Black Top artists, including Henry Butler, Earl King, and Tommy Ridgley.

After Black Top Records closed, Eaglin released the album The Way It Is for Money Pit Records, produced by the Scott brothers of Black Top. In 1997, Eaglin's version of "St. James Infirmary" was featured in a UK television advertisement for Budweiser lager.

Eaglin appears in performance footage in the 2005 documentary film Make It Funky!, which presents a history of New Orleans music and its influence on rhythm and blues, rock and roll, funk and jazz. In the film, he performs "Come On (Let the Good Times Roll)" with guest George Porter Jr. and the house band.

== Death ==
Eaglin died of a heart attack at Ochsner Medical Center in New Orleans on February 18, 2009. He had been diagnosed with prostate cancer in 2008 and had been hospitalized for treatment. He was scheduled to make a comeback appearance at the New Orleans Jazz & Heritage Festival in the spring of 2009. In honor of his contributions to New Orleans music, he was depicted in an artist's rendering on the cover of the "Jazz Fest Bible" edition of Offbeat magazine, for the New Orleans Jazz & Heritage Festival in 2009.

For many years, Eaglin lived in St. Rose, a suburb of New Orleans, with his wife, Dorothea. Though he did not play many live shows, he regularly performed at Rock 'n' Bowl in New Orleans and at the New Orleans Jazz & Heritage Festival.

== Discography ==
=== Original albums ===
- 1958, New Orleans Street Singer, recordings made by Harry Oster, of Louisiana State University, March 1958
- 1959, New Orleans Street Singer (Smithsonian Folkways 2476)
- 1960, Message from New Orleans (Heritage 1002)
- 1961, That's All Right (Prestige/Bluesville 1046)
- 1971, The Legacy of the Blues, Vol. 2 (Sonet 625)
- 1978, Down Yonder – Snooks Eaglin Today (Sonet 752)
- 1987, Baby, You Can Get Your Gun! (Black Top 1037)
- 1989, Out of Nowhere (Black Top 1049)
- 1992, Teasin' You (Black Top 1072)
- 1995, Soul's Edge (Black Top 1112)
- 1996, Soul Train from Nawlins: Live at the Park Tower Blues Festival '95 (P-Vine)
- 1997, Live in Japan (Black Top 1137), US release of Soul Train from Nawlins
- 2002, The Way It Is (Money Pit 1111)

=== Compilation albums ===
- 1959, Possum Up A Simmon Tree (Folk-Lyric 107)
- 1961, New Orleans Washboard Blues (Folk-Lyric 107) reissue
- 1964, Blues from New Orleans, Vol. 2 (Storyville 140)
- 1964, Portraits in Blues, Vol. 1 (Storyville 146)
- 1983, New Orleans 1960–61 (Sundown 709-04)
- 1995, The Complete Imperial Recordings (Capitol/EMI 33918)
- 1996, Heavy Juice (The Blues Collection, Vol. 75) (Orbis BLU 075)
- 2003, Best of Snooks Eaglin (Grammercy 182)
- 2004, The Blues of Snooks Eaglin and Boogie Bill Webb (Storyville 8054)
- 2010, ABC of the Blues, Vol. 10 (Intense Media 233168)
- 2022, The First Decade 1953–62 (Acrobat ADDCD3452) 2-CD

==== Harry Oster recordings ====
- 1991, Country Boy Down in New Orleans (Arhoolie 348)
- 1994, New Orleans Street Singer (Storyville 8023)
- 1994, That's All Right (Prestige/OBC 568)

=== Singles ===
- Yours Truly / Nobody Knows (Imperial 5671, 6/60)
- That Certain Door / By The Water (Imperial 5692, 9/60)
- If I Could / Guess Who (Imperial 5736, 4/61)
- My Head Is Spinnin' / Travelin' Mood (Imperial 5765, 7/61)
- Going To The River / I'm Slippin' In (Imperial 5802, 12/61)
- Nothing Sweet As You / Don't Slam That Door (Imperial 5823, 3/62)
- I've Been Walking / Would You (Imperial 5857, 6/62)
- People Are Talking / Reality (Wake Up) (Imperial 5866, 8/62)
- Long Gone / Willy Lee (Imperial 5890, 11/62)
- Little Eva / Cover Girl (Imperial 5946, 5/63)
- Country Boy / Alberta (Storyville 45056, ?/63)
- Sweetness / Cheetah (Fun 303, ?/64)

== Filmography ==
- 199? Snooks Eaglin & George Porter Jr at Lone Star Roadhouse 1998 VHS (details not known, songs appear on YouTube and elsewhere)
- 2005 The Blues of Snooks Eaglin (Storyville 16041, DVD) – recorded live, October 23, 1985, Storyville Jazz Hall, New Orleans. Also released as Jazz Icons: Snooks Eaglin.
- 2005 Make It Funky! (Sony Pictures Home Entertainment 11952, DVD) – appears in performance footage with George Porter Jr.
