= New Orleans Musicians' Clinic =

Health clinic in New Orleans, Louisiana

The New Orleans Musicians' Clinic (NOMC) is a health service providing New Orleans musicians access to affordable medical services utilizing such facilities as a medical school, volunteers, and community providers. The NOMC hosts community blood drives including live performers supporting the Blood Center of New Orleans.

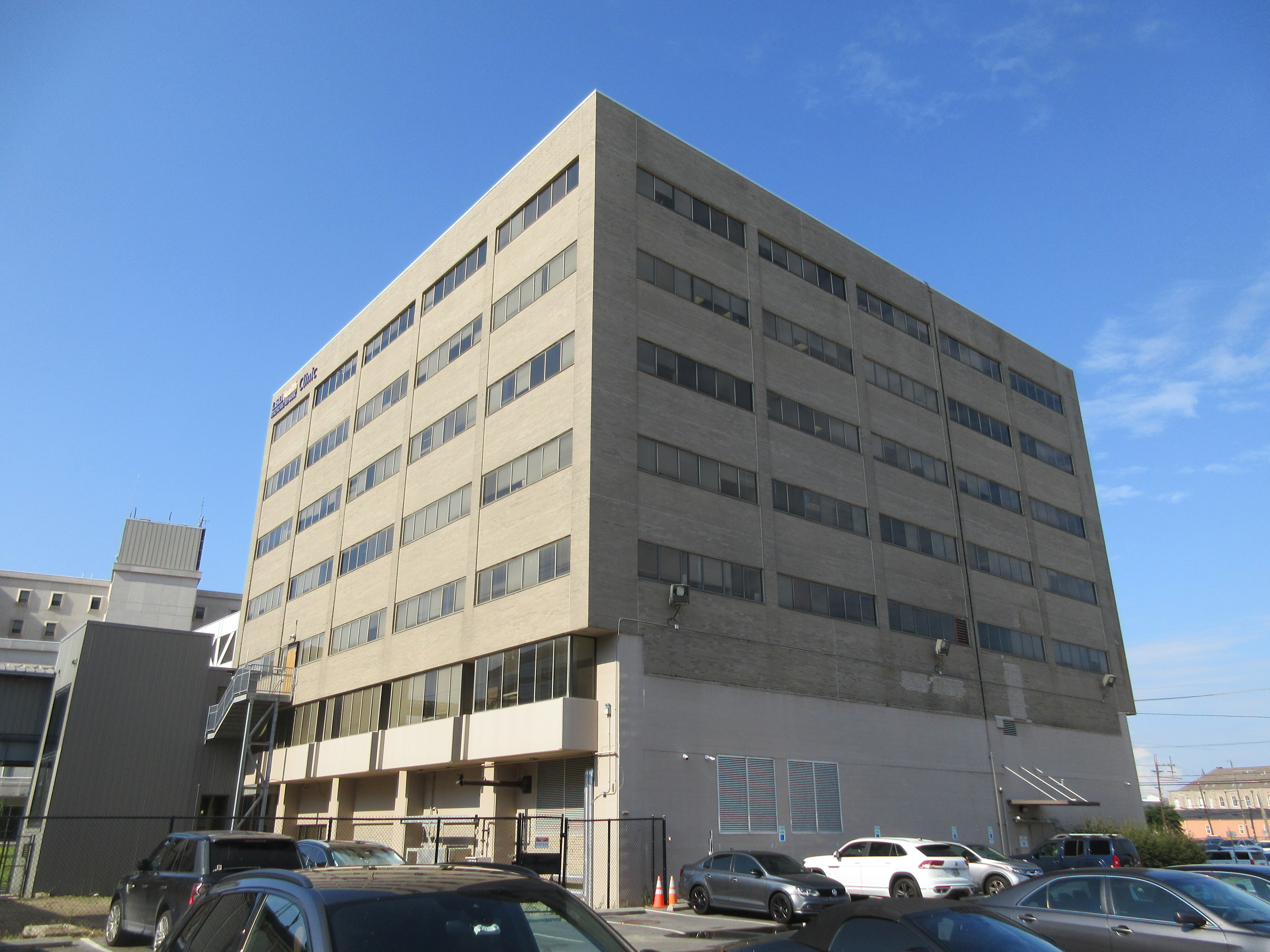
The Clinic moved into the 3rd floor of this building at Johnson & Gravier Streets in New Orleans in 2023

The NOMC is a subsidiary arm of the New Orleans Musicians' Assistance Foundation (NOMAF) and was founded as a partnership with Louisiana State University Health Sciences Center together with a group of advocates including Jack McConnell and Bethany Bultman, who is also the current CEO and president.

== Founder ==
The NOMC was the brain-child of Dr. Jack McConnell MD (retired), as he performed "Bill Bailey" with the rock band Phish, at the 1997 New Orleans Jazz and Heritage Festival.

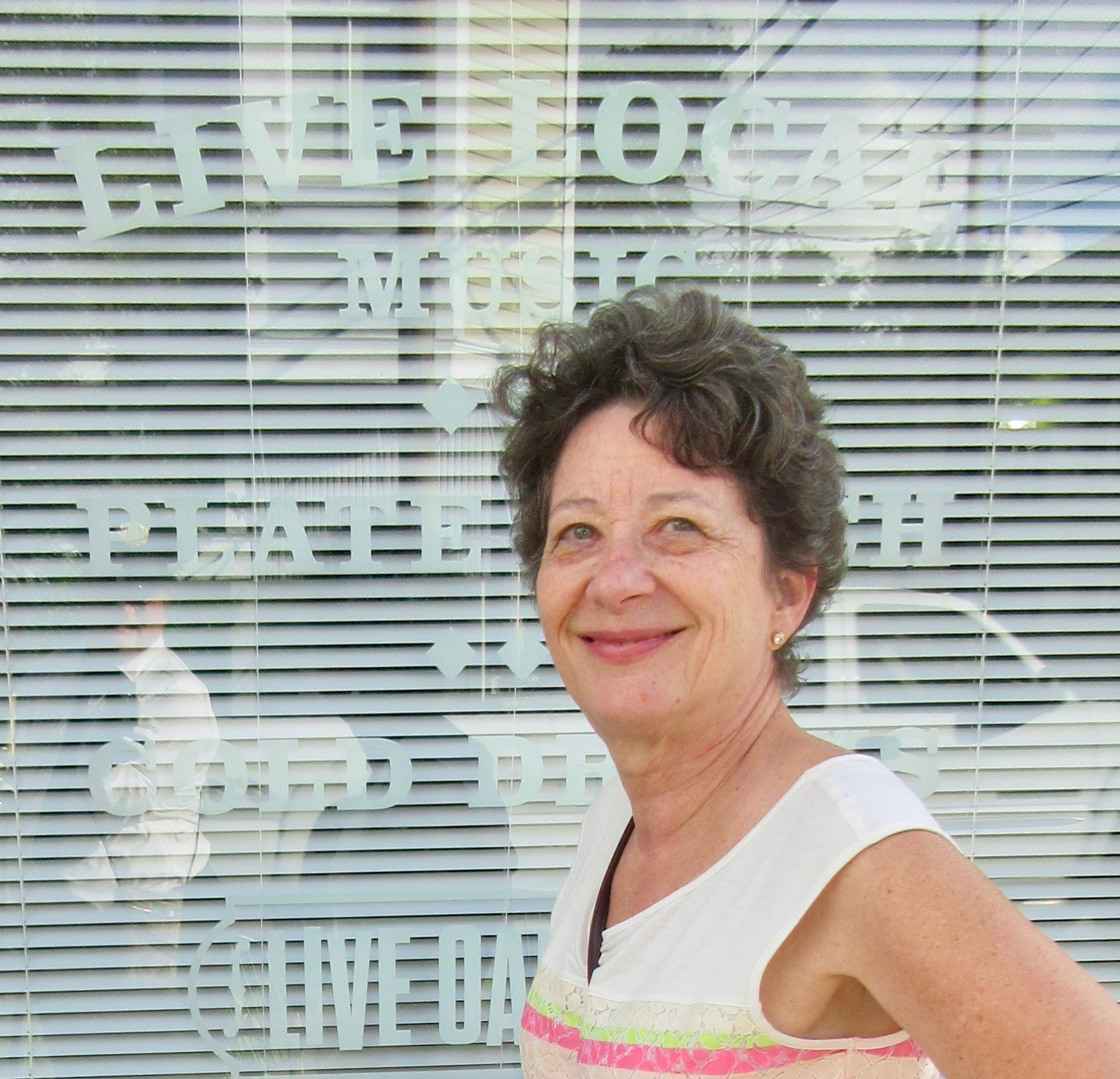
Nurse practitioner Catherine Lasperches was the Clinic's primary healthcare provider from 2004 to 2024

== The idea behind the clinic ==
McConnell met with a team of health advocates for the working poor in Louisiana and musicians' advocates to come up with a medical safety net for New Orleans' musicians. Louisiana has had universal health care since the 1930s, when Louisiana Governor Huey P. Long (1928–1932) pushed a number of bills through the 1929 session of the Louisiana State Legislature to fulfill campaign promises including a universal health program for hospitals and universal "charity" care. In 1995, McConnell set out to design a comprehensive health care system to treat musicians.

== Sphere of Support: Medical, Emotional, Financial, and Social ==
The NOMC's expanded social services include the registration of patients in pharmaceutical assistance programs, crisis and case management, electronic medical records, identifying musician-patients, referral to and follow-up with appropriate agencies, and involvement in regular meetings with partnering organizations to provide outreach to patients in non-clinical settings. The clinic is also involved in local government efforts to improve the health of musicians, such as supporting a ban on smoking in New Orleans bars.

== Partnerships ==
The NOMC works with neighborhood groups like the Musicians' Protective Union. In the Tremé neighborhood, NOMC collaborated to create the St. Anna's Episcopal Church Musicians' Mission, a lively jam session held weekly, which includes a free meal and a "resource hall", providing multiple services such as 5 point anti-stress acupuncture, legal advice, housing assistance, and medical and mental health screenings, and social service referrals.

== New Orleans Musicians Assistance Foundation ==
The New Orleans Musicians Assistance Foundation (NOMAF) evolved from the NOMC following Hurricane Katrina in 2005, sharing the mission and promise to keep New Orleans music alive. NOMAF encompasses the Musicians' Clinic as well as the NOMAF Gig Fund, which provides occupational opportunities for our musicians, the Emergency Fund, the Prevent Death by Lifestyle Program to engage our patients in their own wellness strategies, the Herman Ernest Memorial Health Screening Initiative which provides head and neck cancer screenings in conjunction with the Interfaith community and the Tulane University School of Medicine.

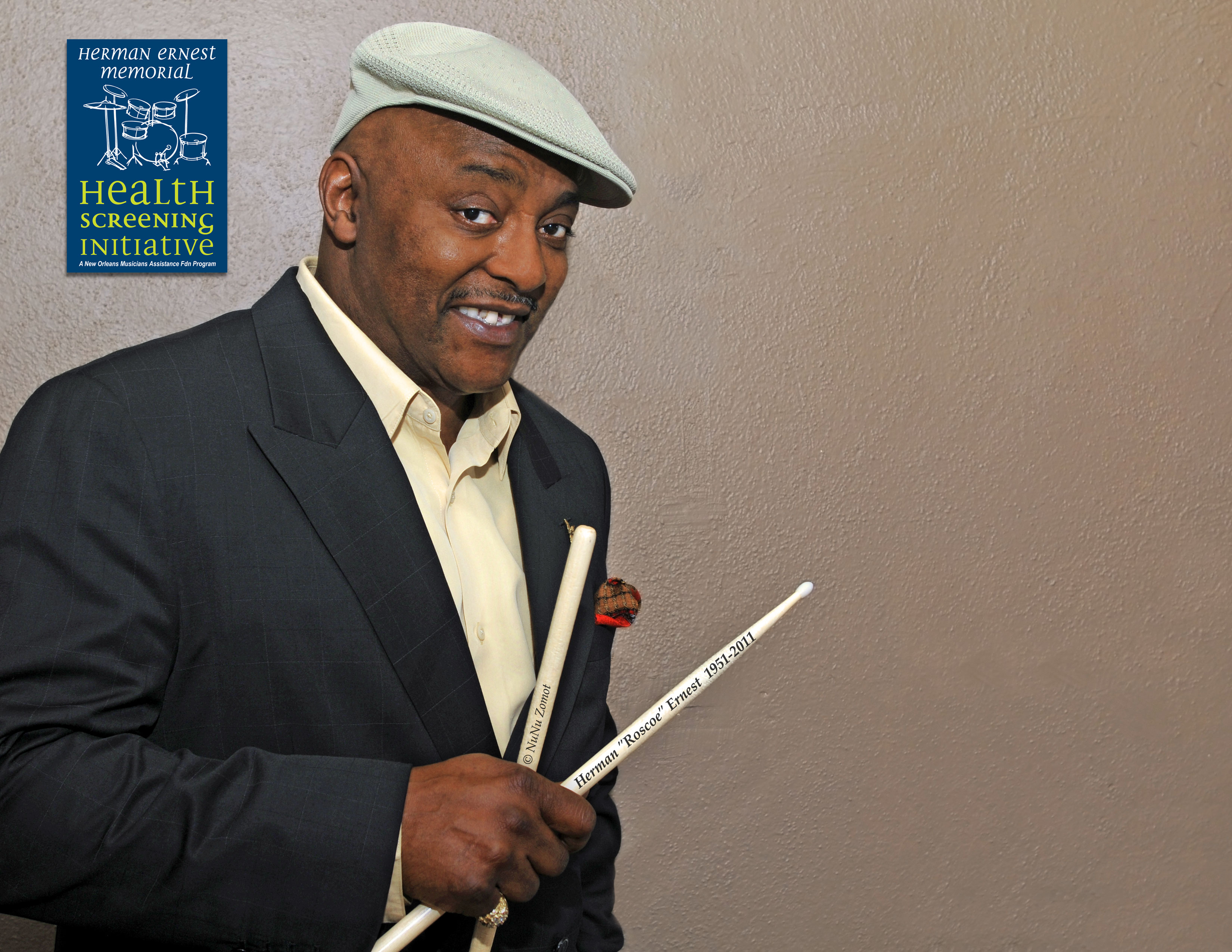
Herman "Roscoe" Ernest III

=== Herman Ernest Memorial Screening Initiative with Healing Hands Across the Divide ===
The Herman Ernest Memorial Screening Initiative is a component of NOMAF's partnership with Healing Hands Across the Divide (HHAD), a public outreach program of the Department of Otolaryngology at Tulane University School of Medicine. This program honors the life of Herman "Roscoe" Ernest III and was formed in March 2011, shortly after he died from oral cancer. Before his death, Roscoe challenged his medical support staff at NOMAF and his doctors at Tulane to promote head and neck cancer awareness, prevention, and early detection throughout his community. African Americans have twice the mortality rate of their non-African American counterparts, and this is in part due to African Americans presenting with a late stage of cancer at the time of diagnosis. Early detection of such cancers is key to improving survival rates. Since March 2011, HHAD has partnered with several local churches and community events to spread awareness about head and neck cancers and conduct cancer screenings . This project is important for all members of the community but especially musicians due to their increased occupational exposure to tobaccos and alcohol, both risk factors for developing head and neck cancer.
