= Maria Muldaur =

American folk and blues singer (born 1942)

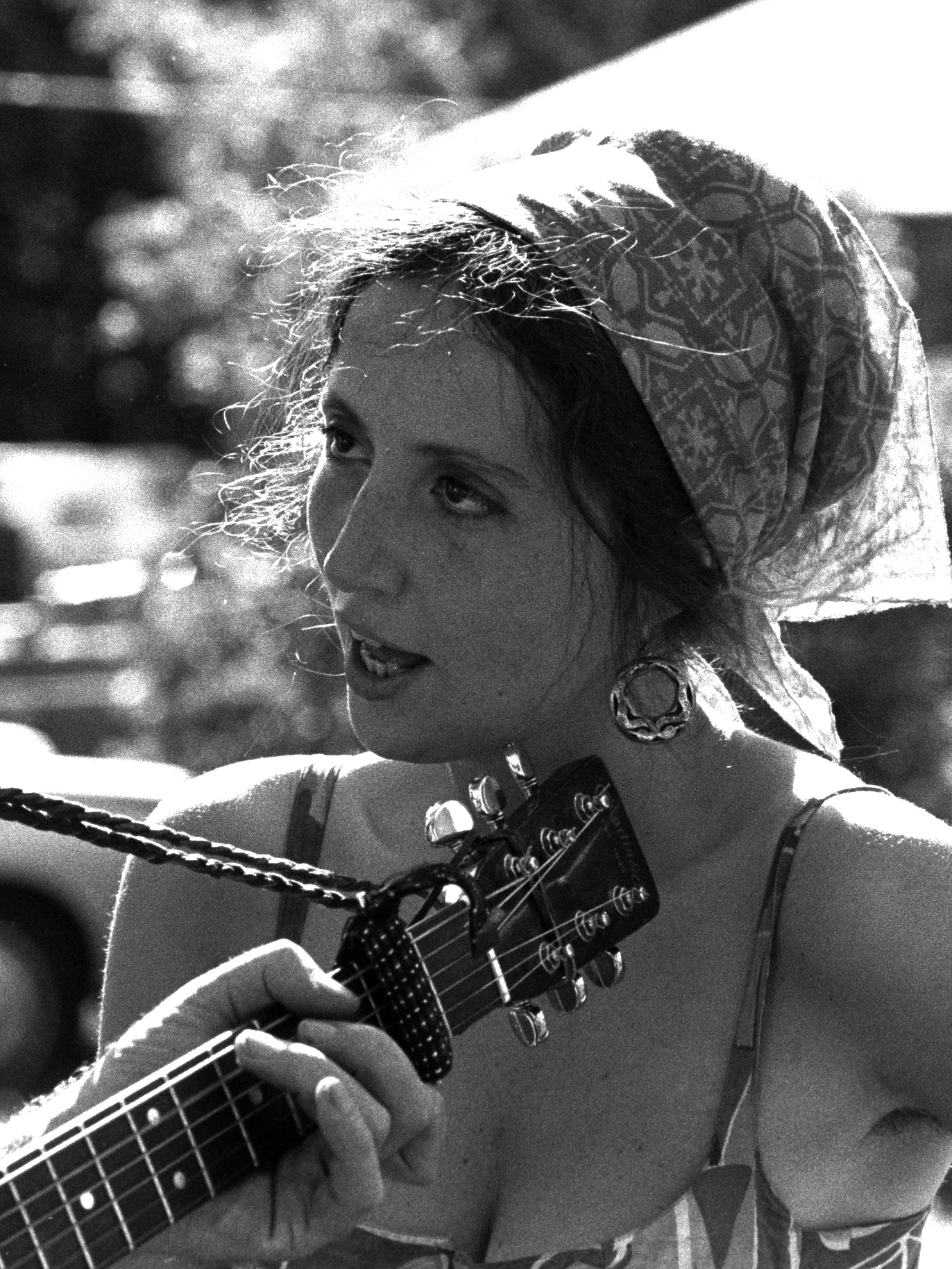
- Muldaur listening to music after Memorial Day weekend on the North Shore north of Boston, 1969

Background information
- Also known as: Maria D'Amato
- Born: Maria Grazia Rosa Domenica D'Amato; September 12, 1942 (age 84); New York City, U.S.
- Genres: Folk; blues; country
- Occupation: Singer
- Instruments: Vocals, guitar
- Years active: 1963–present
- Label: Reprise
- Website: mariamuldaur.com

Maria Muldaur (born Maria Grazia Rosa Domenica D'Amato; September 12, 1942) is an American folk and blues singer who was part of the American folk music revival in the early 1960s. She recorded the 1973 hit song "Midnight at the Oasis" and has recorded albums in the folk, blues, early jazz, gospel, country, and R&B traditions.

She was the wife of musician Geoff Muldaur and is the mother of singer-songwriter Jenni Muldaur.

== Career ==
Muldaur was born on September 12, 1942, in Greenwich Village in Manhattan, New York and attended Hunter College High School on the Upper East Side.

Muldaur cites Kitty Wells, Hank Williams, Hank Snow, Hank Thompson, Ernest Tubb, and Bob Wills and the Texas Playboys; early rhythm and blues artists including Chuck Willis, Little Richard, Ruth Brown, Fats Domino, and Muddy Waters; Alan Freed "rock 'n' roll" shows; and doo-wop groups like The Platters and The Five Satins as being her early musical influences.

Muldaur began her career in the early 1960s as Maria D'Amato, performing with John Sebastian, David Grisman, and Stefan Grossman as a member of the Even Dozen Jug Band. She then joined Jim Kweskin & the Jug Band as a featured vocalist and occasional fiddle player. During this time, she was part of the Greenwich Village scene that included Bob Dylan, and some of her recollections of the period, particularly with respect to Dylan, appear in Martin Scorsese's 2005 documentary film No Direction Home.

She married fellow Jug Band member Geoff Muldaur, and after the Kweskin group broke up, the couple produced two albums. She began her solo career when their marriage ended in 1972 but retained her married name.

Her first solo album, Maria Muldaur, released in 1973, contains her hit single "Midnight at the Oasis", which reached number 6 on the Billboard Hot 100 in 1974. It peaked at No. 21 on the UK Singles Chart. Later in 1974, she released her second album, Waitress in a Donut Shop which includes a re-recording of "I'm a Woman", the Leiber and Stoller number first associated with Peggy Lee and a standout feature from her Jug Band days. Her version of the song reached No. 12 on the Billboard Hot 100, and was her last Hot 100 hit in the U.S. to date. The title of this album is taken from a line in another song on the album, "Sweetheart", by Ken Burgan.

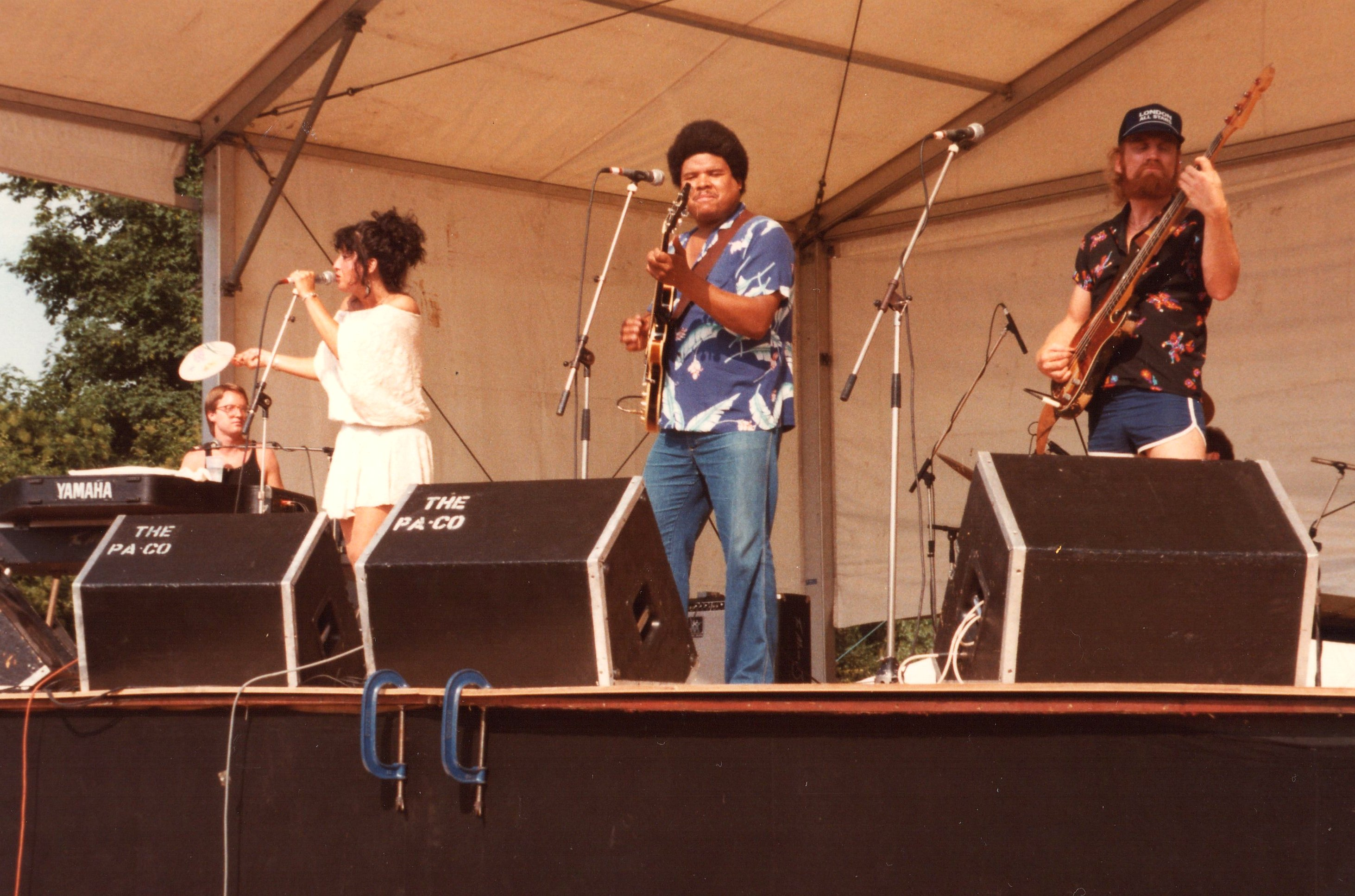
Muldaur (second from left) with her band on stage at the 1983 Cambridge Folk Festival, England

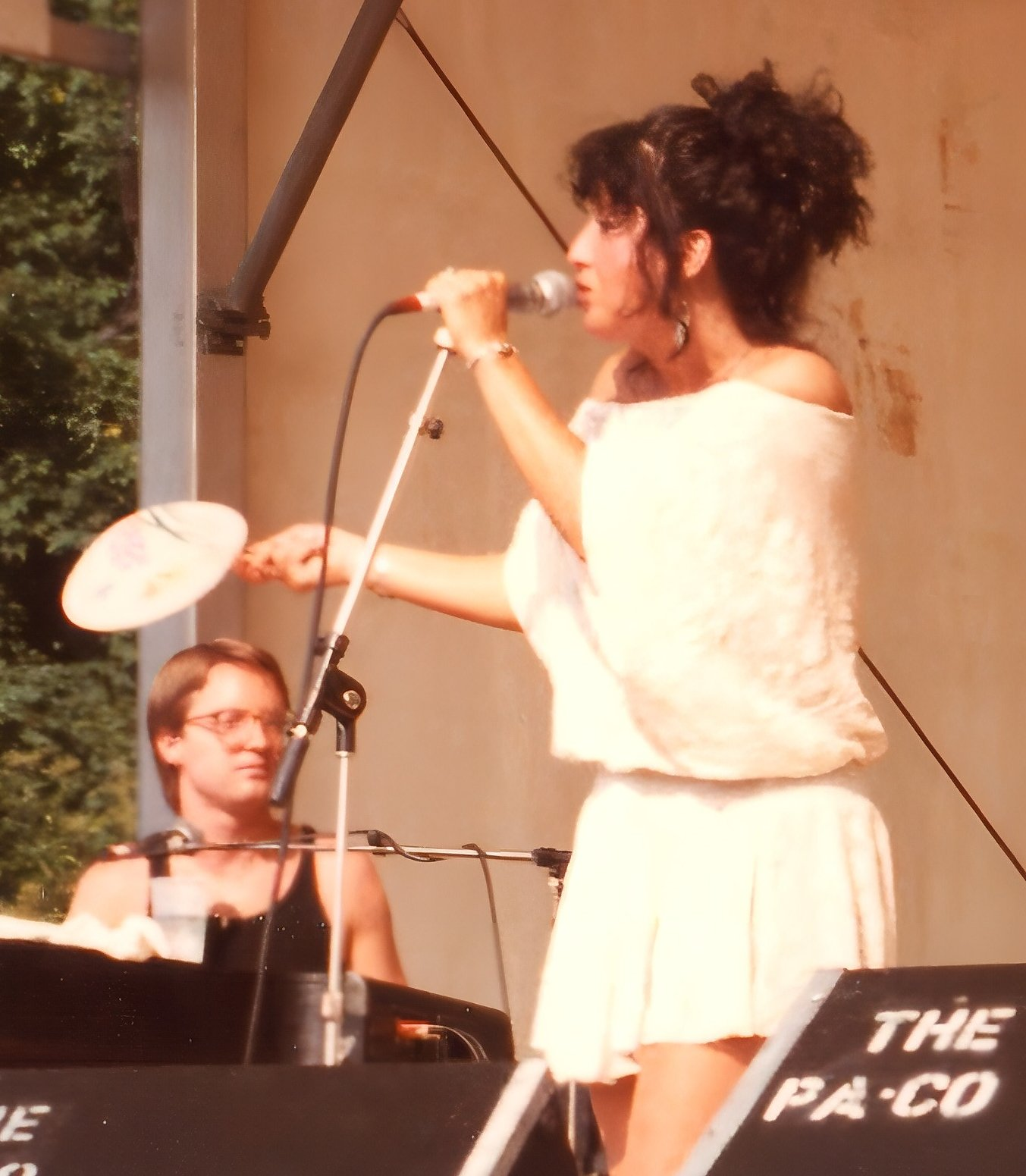
Muldaur at the 1983 Cambridge Folk Festival (detail from above image)

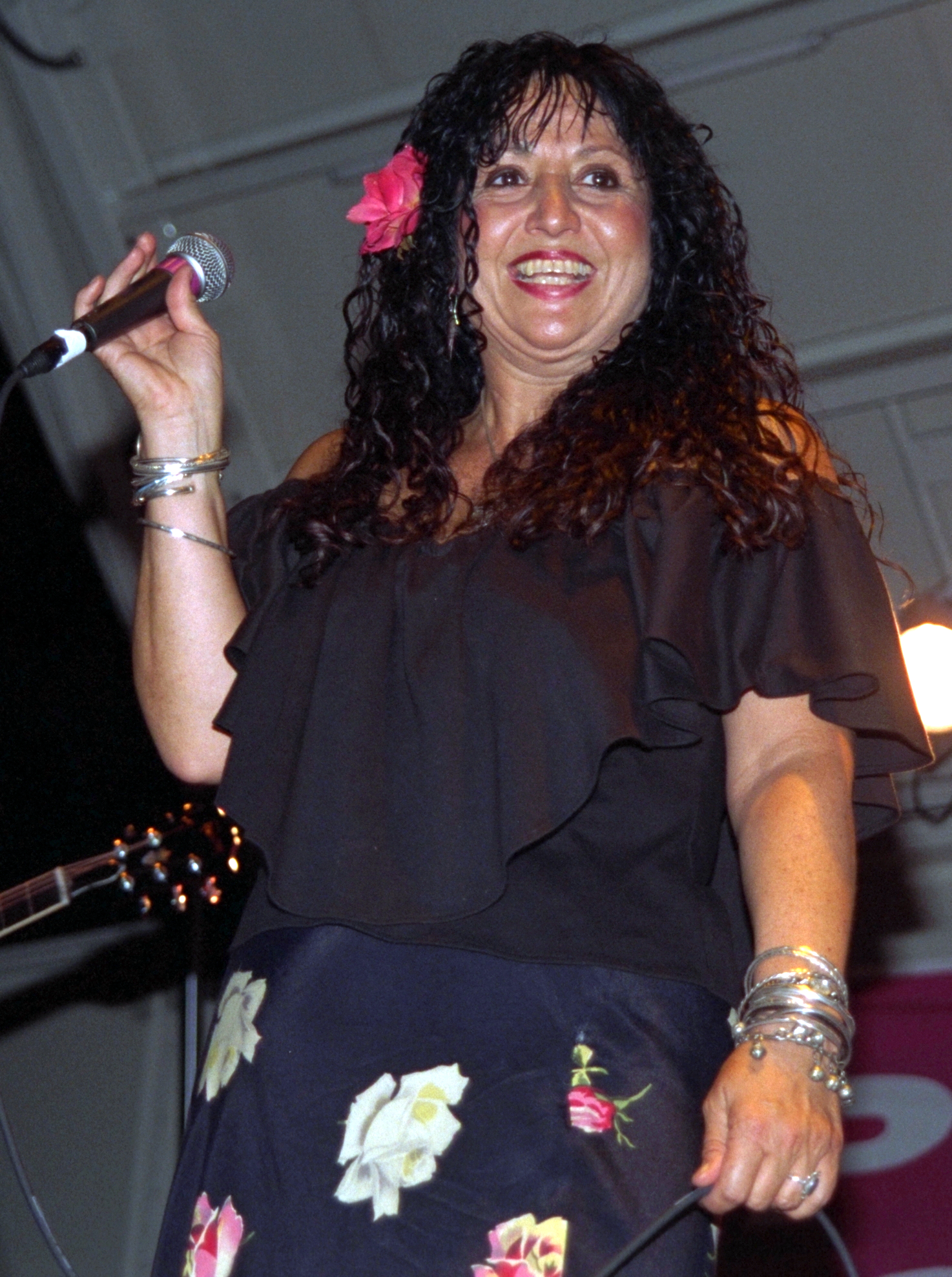
Muldaur at the Riverwalk Blues Festival in Fort Lauderdale, Florida, September 1996

Around that time, Muldaur established a relationship with the Grateful Dead. Opening for some Grateful Dead shows in the summer of 1974, with John Kahn, bassist of the Jerry Garcia Band, eventually earned her a seat in the group as a backing vocalist in the late 1970s. Around the same time Muldaur met and eventually collaborated with bluegrass icon Peter Rowan. The two became close, and she was chosen to be the godmother of his daughter Amanda Rowan. She appeared on Super Jam (1989).

People ask me—why do you do these sexist songs? That's bull_. That's a valid emotion that's a part of us all.

Around 1980, Muldaur became a Christian and released a live album, Gospel Nights, and a studio album, There Is A Love. In 1983 she returned to secular music with Sweet and Slow, a set informed by vintage jazz and blues. Muldaur continued to perform, tour, and record after her success in the mid 1970s, including a turn at the Teatro ZinZanni in 2001.

Her 2005 release Sweet Lovin' Ol' Soul was nominated for both a Blues Music Award (formerly the W. C. Handy Awards) and a Grammy Award in the Traditional Blues category at the 44th Annual Grammy Awards. In 2013, she was nominated for a Blues Music Award in the Koko Taylor Award (Traditional Blues Female) category.

In 2003, Muldaur performed at Carnegie Hall in a Peggy Lee tribute concert produced by Richard Barone. In 2018 she performed in Barone's Central Park concert Music & Revolution along with John Sebastian and others from her Greenwich Village days. In 2019, she received the Trailblazer award at the Americana Music Honors & Awards.

In 2021, Muldaur recorded and released the album Let's Get Happy Together, a 40-minute, 12-track album in collaboration with Tuba Skinny.

== Discography ==
=== Even Dozen Jug Band ===
- The Even Dozen Jug Band (1964, credited as Maria D'Amato) (Elektra Records, EKS-7246)

=== Jim Kweskin & the Jug Band ===
- Jug Band Music (1965, credited as Maria D'Amato) (Vanguard Records, VDS-79163)
- See Reverse Side for Title (1966, credited as Maria D'Amato) (Vanguard Records, VDS-79234)
- Garden of Joy (1967) (Reprise Records, RS-6266)
- The Best of Jim Kweskin & the Jug Band (1968, compilation, credited as Maria D'Amato) (Vanguard Records, VDS-79270)

=== Geoff & Maria Muldaur ===
- Pottery Pie (1969) (Reprise Records, RS-6350)
- Sweet Potatoes (1972) (Reprise Records, MS-2073)

=== Solo ===
Solo discography
Year	Album title	Label	Catalog number	US	US Blues	AUS	Notes
1973	Maria Muldaur	Reprise Records	MS-2148	3		30	
1974	Waitress in a Donut Shop	Reprise	MS-2194	23		66	
1976	Sweet Harmony	Reprise	MS-2235	53			
1978	Southern Winds	Warner Bros. Records	BSK-3162	143		91	
1979	Open Your Eyes	Warner Bros.	BSK-3305			97	
1980	Gospel Nights	Takoma Records	TAK-7084				Recorded at McCabe's with The Chambers Brothers
1982	There Is a Love	Myrrh Records	MSB-6685				
1983	Sweet and Slow	Spindrift Records/Making Waves	SPIN-109				With Dr. John, Kenny Barron, and other guest artists. (CD reissue: Stony Plain Records, SPCD-1183)
1985	Live in London	Spindrift/Making Waves; Stony Plain Records	SPIN-116; SP-1099				Recorded on September 7, 1984 at Ronnie Scott's Jazz Club.
1986	Transblucency	Uptown Records	UP-27.25				Recorded 1984–1985 with a jazz septet
1990	On the Sunny Side	Music for Little People/Warner Bros.	42503				
1992	Louisiana Love Call	Black Top Records	BT-1081				Reissued by Shout! Factory with same part number
1993	Jazzabelle	Stony Plain	SPCD-1188				
1994	Meet Me at Midnite	Black Top	BT-1107				Reissued by Shout! Factory with same part number
1996	Fanning the Flames	Telarc	CD-83394		14		With Johnny Adams, Huey Lewis, Bonnie Raitt, Mavis Staples, and other guest artists
1998	Southland of the Heart	Telarc	CD-83423				
1998	Swingin' in the Rain (Classic Swing Tunes for Kids of All Ages)	Music for Little People/Rhino Records	R2-75311				
1999	Meet Me Where They Play the Blues	Telarc	CD-83460				With Charles Brown, Danny Caron, David K. Mathews, and other guest artists
2000	Maria Muldaur's Music for Lovers	Telarc	CD-83512				Compilation
2001	Richland Woman Blues	Stony Plain	SPCD-1270		9		With Raitt, Taj Mahal, Alvin Youngblood Hart, John Sebastian, Roy Rogers, and other guest artists
2002	Animal Crackers in My Soup: The Songs of Shirley Temple	Music for Little People/Rhino	R2-78179				With Carrie Lyn.
2003	A Woman Alone with the Blues (...Remembering Peggy Lee)	Telarc	CD-83568		9		
2003	Classic Live!	Burnside/DIG Music	UPC: 80440 30110 27				Live radio broadcasts from 1973 and 1975
2004	I'm a Woman: 30 Years of Maria Muldaur	Shout! Factory	SF-30219				Compilation
2004	Sisters & Brothers	Telarc	CD-83588				With Eric Bibb, and Rory Block
2004	Love Wants to Dance	Telarc	CD-83609				
2005	Sweet Lovin' Ol' Soul (Old Highway 61 Revisited)	Stony Plain	SPCD-1304		6		With Taj Mahal, Tracy Nelson, Pinetop Perkins, Del Rey, Steve James, and other guest artists)
2006	Heart of Mine: Maria Muldaur Sings Love Songs of Bob Dylan	Telarc	CD-83643		1		
2006	Songs for the Young at Heart	Music for Little People/Earth Beat!/Rhino	R2-74541				Compilation
2007	Naughty, Bawdy & Blue	Stony Plain	SPCD-1319		4		With James Dapogny's Chicago Jazz Band and Bonnie Raitt
2008	Live in Concert	Global Recording Artists	UPC: 646413 126427				
2008	Yes We Can!	Telarc	CD-83672		14		With Joan Baez, Raitt, Phoebe Snow, Jane Fonda, Holly Near, Odetta, Anne Lamott, Marianne Williamson, Amma, Jean Shinoda Bolen, and the Women's Voices for Peace Choir
2009	Maria Muldaur & Her Garden of Joy: Good Time Music for Hard Times	Stony Plain	SPCD-1332		11		
2010	Maria Muldaur's Barnyard Dance: Jug Band Music for Kids	Music for Little People/Rhino	R2-524467				
2010	Christmas at the Oasis (Live at the Rrazz Room)	Global Recording Artists	UPC: 646413 128728				
2011	Steady Love	Stony Plain	SPCD-1346				
2012	...First Came Memphis Minnie... A Loving Tribute	Stony Plain	SPCD-1358				With Block, Ruthie Foster, Raitt, Phoebe Snow, Koko Taylor, and other guest artists.
2018	Don't You Feel My Leg: The Naughty Bawdy Blues of Blue Lu Barker	The Last Music Company	LMCD-210		10		
2021	Let's Get Happy Together	Stony Plain	SPCD-1429		4		With Tuba Skinny
2025	One Hour Mama: The Blues of Victoria Spivey	Nola Blue	NBR-044				

=== Jerry Garcia Band ===
- Cats Under the Stars (1978, Arista Records)
- Pure Jerry: Warner Theatre, March 18, 1978 (2005, Jerry Made)
- Pure Jerry: Bay Area 1978 (2009, Jerry Made)
- Garcia Live Volume Four (2014, ATO Records)

=== Paul Butterfield's Better Days ===
- Better Days (1973, Bearsville Records) – on tracks 5, 7, and 8
- It All Comes Back (1973, Bearsville) – credited as "vocals", but no specific tracks given

=== Other contributions ===
- Festival:The Newport Folk Festival 1965 (1967, credited as Maria D'Amato) (Vanguard Records VRS-9225/VSD-79225) – Lead vocals on "Tricks Ain't Walkin' No More"; and backing vocals on Eric von Schmidt's, "My Love Comes Rolling Down".
- Steelyard Blues original motion picture soundtrack (1972, Warner Bros. Records; reissued on CD in 2015 by Real Gone Music) – Lead vocals on three songs ("Georgia Blues", "Do I Care" and "Lonesome Star Blues") which also feature Mike Bloomfield and Paul Butterfield.
- Wendy Waldman, Love Has Got Me (1973, Warner Bros. Records) – Background vocals on "Lee's Traveling Song".
- Mike Seeger The Second Annual Farewell Reunion (1973, Mercury Records) – Vocals and guitar on “Take Me Back to the Sweet Sunny South”.
- Linda Ronstadt, Heart Like a Wheel (1974, Capitol Records) – Harmony vocals on "Heart Like a Wheel".
- Wendy Waldman, Gypsy Symphony (1974, Warner Bros.) – Background vocals on "Come On Down".
- Linda Ronstadt, Prisoner In Disguise (1975, Elektra Records) – Harmony/background vocals on "You Tell Me That I'm Falling Down".
- The Doobie Brothers, Stampede (1975, Warner Bros.) – Vocals on "I Cheat the Hangman".
- Elvin Bishop, Hog Heaven (1978, Capricorn Records) – on two songs
- Mike Seeger, Third Annual Farewell Reunion (1994, Rounder Records) – Lead vocals on "The Memory Of Your Smile".
- Terry Robb, Stop This World (1996, Burnside Records BCD-0025)
- Johnny's Blues: A Tribute to Johnny Cash (2003, NorthernBlues Music) – Muldaur contributes "Walking the Blues"; the Johnny Cash version is on the album The Legend (Sun Records, 1970), and on The Essential Johnny Cash 1955–1983 (Legacy Recordings, 1992).
- Bill Kirchen, Word to the Wise (2010, Proper Records) – Vocals on "Ain't Got Time For the Blues".
