= Harry Oster =

American folklorist

Harry Oster (April 12, 1923 – January 19, 2001) was an American folklorist and musicologist.

== Biography ==
Oster was the firstborn of Jacob and Sarah, Russian-Polish Jews, who emigrated to Cambridge, Massachusetts.

After one year in college, he was enlisted in January 1943 to serve as a weather observer, graduated from Columbia Business School with an MBA and became a firm manager. He went on to Harvard University to receive a BA (1946), and to Cornell University for an MA (1950) and PhD in English (1953). He worked as an assistant in the Cornell department and helped to organize folk-themed public events.

From 1955 he taught at Louisiana State University, English department. In 1956 he was among the three founders of the Louisiana Folklore Society, through which he issued his recordings of folk music from Louisiana, although the society did not fund them. The early material included Cajun music from Mamou. Louisiana Folksong Jambalaya is a collection of folk songs sung by himself.

In 1959 Oster went with New Orleans jazz historian Richard B. Allen to the Louisiana State Penitentiary, also known as Angola prison, to record African American Blues, Spirituals sung by choirs and soloists, Sermons and personal interviews. The musicians he recorded there for the first time include Robert Pete Williams, Roosevelt Charles, Hogman Maxey, Otis Webster and Robert Guitar Welch, the first of whom was pardoned and was to have a remarkable career. The same year he made, by Allen's advice, a record of Snooks Eaglin in New Orleans and sold it to Folkways Records.

The following recordings were released by his own record label, Folk-Lyric. It was a labor Oster carried alone, packaging and sending the records to buyers and reviewers, with artworks lithographed by hand. Other artists of the label included Reverend Pearly Brown, Louisiana Honeydrippers and the duo Butch Cage and Willie B. Thomas. By the end of the 1960s its catalogue was sold to Arhoolie Records.

In 1963 Oster went as a visiting professor to the University of Iowa, College of Liberal Arts and Sciences. The next year he received associate professorship and in 1968 full professorship. Unlike LSU, this university wished to dedicate some of the English curriculum to folklore. In Iowa he developed many new courses, from American Folk Literature to American Jewish Writers to Blues, Ragtime, and Jazz.

His effort to record and endear folk arts ensued in Iowa with releasing Folk Voices of Iowa in 1965 and creating the Old Time Fiddlers Picnic with Art Rosenbaum.

His first book, Living Country Blues, published in 1969, became a landmark in its field. He produced long lists of articles and recordings.

Along the way, he earned grants from Guggenheim fellowship (1961), Ford Foundation and the National Endowment for the Humanities.

The culmination of Oster's scholarly career came in 2000, with the publication of his Penguin Dictionary of American Folklore.

Oster married Caroline Leinhauser of Ottumwa, Iowa. Their son Aaron graduated from the university of Iowa and teaches theatre. The family home in Oak Lawn Avenue, Iowa City, was dotted with a collection of musical instruments, farm tools, quilts and antique furniture, some which he repaired on his own.
