= Bonnie Raitt discography =

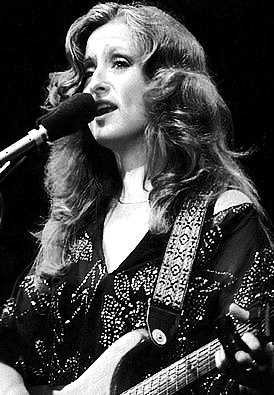
- Raitt in 1977
- Studio albums: 18
- Live albums: 3
- Compilation albums: 3
- Singles: 42

This article lists the discography of American blues and rock singer and songwriter Bonnie Raitt.

== Albums ==
=== Studio albums ===
Title	Year	Peak chart positions										Certifications
Title	Year	US	AUS	BEL (FL)	CAN	GER	NL	NZ	SWE	SWI	UK	Certifications
Bonnie Raitt	1971	—	—	—	—	—	—	—	—	—	—	
Give It Up	1972	138	—	—	—	—	—	—	—	—	—	RIAA: Gold
Takin' My Time	1973	87	—	—	—	—	—	—	—	—	—	
Streetlights	1974	80	—	—	—	—	—	—	—	—	—	
Home Plate	1975	43	—	—	—	—	—	—	—	—	—	
Sweet Forgiveness	1977	25	—	—	—	—	—	—	—	—	—	RIAA: Gold
The Glow	1979	30	—	—	—	—	—	—	—	—	—	
Green Light	1982	38	—	—	—	—	—	—	—	—	—	
Nine Lives	1986	115	—	—	—	—	—	—	—	—	—	
Nick of Time	1989	1	58	—	—	68	65	—	—	—	51	RIAA: 5× Platinum; MC: 3× Platinum
Luck of the Draw	1991	2	16	—	—	55	26	6	37	16	38	RIAA: 7× Platinum; MC: 4× Platinum
Longing in Their Hearts	1994	1	27	—	—	70	34	7	36	40	26	MC: Platinum; RIAA: 2× Platinum
Fundamental	1998	17	149	—	—	—	89	—	—	43	52	MC: Gold; RIAA: Gold
Silver Lining	2002	13	—	—	—	—	—	—	—	—	—	RIAA: Gold
Souls Alike	2005	19	—	—	—	—	—	—	—	—	—	
Slipstream	2012	6	—	51	14	—	24	34	49	—	64	
Dig In Deep	2016	11	—	29	37	76	23	38	50	80	35	
Just Like That...	2022	44	—	194	—	54	—	—	—	28	—	
"—" denotes a release that did not chart or was not released in that territory.

=== Live albums ===
Title	Year	Peak chart positions					Certifications
Title	Year	US	AUS	NL	SWI	UK	Certifications
Road Tested	1995	44	142	62	40	69	MC: Gold; RIAA: Gold
Decades Rock Live: Bonnie Raitt and Friends	2006	—	—	—	—	—	RIAA: Gold (Video)
Ultrasonic Studios 1972 (with Lowell George)	2014	— (Note: Ultrasonic Studios 1972 did not enter the Billboard 200, but it peaked at number 4 on the Billboard Blues Albums chart.)	—	—	—	—	
"—" denotes a release that did not chart or was not released in that territory.

=== Compilation albums ===
Title	Year	Peak chart positions					Certifications
Title	Year	US	AUS	NL	NZ	UK	Certifications
The Bonnie Raitt Collection	1990	61	138	78	—	—	RIAA: Gold
The Best of Bonnie Raitt	2003	47	—	—	36	37	BPI: Silver
Opus Collection: Something to Talk About	2011	82	—	—	—	—	
"—" denotes a release that did not chart or was not released in that territory.

== Singles ==
Title	Year	Peak chart positions										Album
Title	Year	US	US AAA	US AC	US Main	AUS	CAN	GER	NL	NZ	UK	Album
"Too Long at the Fair"	1972	—	—	—	—	—	—	—	—	—	—	Give It Up
"You've Been in Love Too Long"	1973	—	—	—	—	—	—	—	—	—	—	Takin' My Time
"Good Enough"	1975	—	—	—	—	—	—	—	—	—	—	Home Plate
"Run Like a Thief"	1976	—	—	—	—	—	—	—	—	—	—	Home Plate
"Runaway"	1977	57	—	—	—	—	79	—	—	—	—	Sweet Forgiveness
"Two Lives"	1977	—	—	—	—	—	—	—	—	—	—	Sweet Forgiveness
"Gamblin' Man"	1977	—	—	—	—	—	—	—	—	—	—	Sweet Forgiveness
"You're Gonna Get What's Coming"	1979	73	—	—	—	—	—	—	—	—	—	The Glow
"Don't It Make You Wanna Dance" (Note: "Don't It Make You Wanna Dance" peaked at number 42 on the Hot Country Songs chart.)	1980	—	—	—	—	—	—	—	—	—	—	Urban Cowboy: Original Motion Picture Soundtrack
"Keep This Heart in Mind"	1982	— (Note: "Keep This Heart in Mind" did not enter the Billboard Hot 100, but peaked at number 4 on the Bubbling Under Hot 100 Singles chart.)	—	—	39	—	—	—	—	—	—	Green Light
"Me and the Boys"	1982	— (Note: "Me and the Boys" did not enter the Billboard Hot 100, but peaked at number 9 on the Bubbling Under Hot 100 Singles chart.)	—	—	—	—	—	—	—	—	—	Green Light
"No Way to Treat a Lady"	1986	—	—	—	15	—	95	—	—	—	—	Nine Lives
"Crimes of Passion"	1987	—	—	—	—	—	—	—	—	—	—	Nine Lives
"Thing Called Love"	1989	—	—	—	11	153	—	—	66	—	86	Nick of Time
"Have a Heart"	1990	49	—	3	—	149	16	—	19	—	—	Nick of Time
"Nick of Time"	1990	92	—	10	—	142	—	73	67	—	82	Nick of Time
"Love Letter"	1990	—	—	35	49	—	73	—	—	—	—	Nick of Time
"Something to Talk About"	1991	5	—	5	12	57	3	57	59	33	106	Luck of the Draw
"I Can't Make You Love Me"	1991	18	—	6	—	77	40	—	43	22	50	Luck of the Draw
"Slow Ride"	1991	—	—	—	28	—	—	—	—	—	—	Luck of the Draw
"Not the Only One"	1992	34	—	2	—	—	13	—	—	—	—	Luck of the Draw
"Come to Me"	1992	—	—	10	—	—	36	—	—	—	—	Luck of the Draw
"All at Once"	1992	—	—	17	—	—	—	—	—	—	—	Luck of the Draw
"Love Sneakin' Up On You"	1994	19	—	2	25	118	1	71	—	—	69	Longing in Their Hearts
"You"	1994	92	—	15	—	—	16	—	—	—	31	Longing in Their Hearts
"Storm Warning"	1994	—	—	38	—	—	36	—	—	—	—	Longing in Their Hearts
"You Got It"	1995	33	—	6	—	120	11	80	—	—	—	Boys on the Side: Original Soundtrack Album
"Rock Steady" (with Bryan Adams)	1995	73	—	30	—	117	17	—	—	—	50	Road Tested
"One Belief Away"	1998	—	1	15	—	—	24	—	—	—	—	Fundamental
"Spit of Love"	1998	—	20	—	—	—	—	—	—	—	—	Fundamental
"Lover's Will"	1999	—	—	23	—	—	—	—	—	—	—	Fundamental
"It's All Over Now, Baby Blue"	2000	—	23	—	—	—	—	—	—	—	—	Steal This Movie! soundtrack
"I Can't Help You Now"	2002	—	4	15	—	—	—	—	—	—	—	Silver Lining
"Silver Lining"	2002	—	10	21	—	—	—	—	—	—	—	Silver Lining
"Time of Our Lives"	2003	—	—	27	—	—	—	—	—	—	—	Silver Lining
"Poor Poor Pitiful Me" (with Jackson Browne)	2004	—	16	—	—	—	—	—	—	—	—	Enjoy Every Sandwich: The Songs of Warren Zevon
"I Will Not Be Broken"	2005	—	2	27	—	—	—	—	—	—	—	Souls Alike
"I Don't Want Anything to Change"	2006	—	—	38	—	—	—	—	—	—	—	Souls Alike
"Right Down the Line"	2012	—	17	—	—	—	—	—	—	—	—	Slipstream
"Used to Rule the World"	2012	—	22	—	—	—	—	—	—	—	—	Slipstream
"Gypsy in Me"	2016	—	21	—	—	—	—	—	—	—	—	Dig in Deep
"Made Up Mind"	2022	—	17	—	—	—	—	—	—	—	—	Just Like That...
"—" denotes a release that did not chart or was not released in that territory.

== Other charted songs ==
Title	Year	Peak chart positions			Album
Title	Year	US Digital	US Rock	CAN Digital	Album
"Angel from Montgomery"	2020	—	— (Note: "Angel from Montgomery" did not enter the Hot Rock & Alternative Songs chart, but peaked at number 8 on the Rock Digital Song Sales chart.)	—	Streetlights
"Angel from Montgomery" (with John Prine)	2020	30	20	—	Tribute to Steve Goodman
"Just Like That"	2023	6	26	11	Just Like That...
"—" denotes a release that did not chart or was not released in that territory.

== Other appearances ==
Song	Year	Album
"Darlin'"	1980	Urban Cowboy: Original Motion Picture Soundtrack
"Don't It Make You Want to Dance"	1980	Urban Cowboy: Original Motion Picture Soundtrack
Various songs (backing vocals)	1988	Roy Orbison and Friends: A Black and White Night
"Love Ain't No Triple Play" (with Dr. John)	1988	Bull Durham: Original Motion Picture Soundtrack
"Baby Mine" (with Was (Not Was))	1988	Stay Awake: Various Interpretations of Music from Vintage Disney Films
"Right Place, Wrong Time" (with B.B. King)	1990	Air America: Original Soundtrack Album
"Thing Called Love" (live version)	1994	Grammy's Greatest Moments Volume I
"I Can't Make You Love Me" (live version)	1994	Grammy's Greatest Moments Volume III
"You Got It"	1995	Boys on the Side: Original Soundtrack Album
"Pride and Joy" (with Double Trouble)	1996	Tribute to Stevie Ray Vaughan
"Feels Like Home"	1996	Michael: Music From The Motion Picture
"The Road Is My Middle Name"	1997	The Bridge School Concerts Volume 1
"Cold, Cold, Cold" (with Little Feat)	1997	Rock and Roll Doctor: A Tribute to Lowell George
"A Stór Mo Chroí"	1999	Tears of Stone (album by the Chieftains)
"It's All Over Now, Baby Blue"	2000	Steal This Movie (Music From The Motion Picture)
	2002	Coming of Age (Jude Johnstone album) (album by Jude Johnstone)
"Me And The Boys"	2004	The Q People: A Tribute to NRBQ
"Will the Sun Ever Shine Again"	2004	Home on the Range: An Original Walt Disney Records Soundtrack
"I'm in Love Again/All by Myself" (with Jon Cleary)	2007	Goin' Home: A Tribute to Fats Domino
"Love Has No Pride" (with Crosby, Stills & Nash)	2010	The 25th Anniversary Rock & Roll Hall of Fame Concerts
"Everywhere I Go" (with David Lindley)	2014	Looking Into You: A Tribute to Jackson Browne

== Music videos ==
Year	Video
1982	"Keep This Heart in Mind"
1989	"Thing Called Love"
1990	"Have a Heart"
1990	"Nick of Time"
1990	"Love Letter"
1991	"Something to Talk About"
1991	"I Can't Make You Love Me"
1992	"Not the Only One"
1994	"Love Sneakin' Up On You"
1994	"You"
1994	"Storm Warning"
1995	"You Got It"
1998	"One Belief Away"
1998	"Lover's Will"
1998	"Blue For No Reason"
2012	"Right Down The Line"
2016	"Gypsy in Me"
2022	"Made Up Mind"
