= The Bonnie Raitt Collection =

Greatest hits album by Bonnie Raitt
- Released: July 10, 1990
- Genre: Rock
- Length: 75:16
- Label: Warner Brothers

Bonnie Raitt chronology
Nick of Time (1989)	The Bonnie Raitt Collection (1990)	Luck of the Draw (1991)

Professional ratings
Review scores
Source	Rating
Allmusic	3/5 stars
Entertainment Weekly	A
Select	4/5 medals

The Bonnie Raitt Collection is the first compilation album by Bonnie Raitt. It includes songs from her first nine albums while with Warner Brothers, which were released from 1971 to 1986. Raitt would go on to have much greater success with her stint with Capitol Records.

== Critical reception ==
William Ruhlmann of AllMusic concludes his review of The Bonnie Raitt Collection with, "Even taking into account differences in taste, Raitt's choices run in the face of the preferences of fans and critics to the point that the album fails to make the case for her Warners recordings as true expressions of her talents, a case that could have been made decisively with a better selection."

Greg Sandow of Entertainment Weekly writes, "this compendium justifies itself by its quality. It reveals Raitt first as a 21-year-old blues singer, performing songs with titles like "Finest Lovin' Man" in an aching, pure voice. But already she was adding depth and, often, sadness to what she sang." He gives the album an "A" rating.

Mark Cooper of Q Magazine writes, "This personally selected compilation is a testament to Raitt's ability to make songs her own and further evidence that she isn't always the best judge of her own material."

== Track listing ==
No.	Title	Writer(s)	Original album	Length
1.	"Finest Lovin' Man"	Bonnie Raitt	Bonnie Raitt (1971)	3:57
2.	"Give It Up or Let Me Go"	Raitt	Give It Up (1972)	4:28
3.	"Women Be Wise" (live duet with Sippie Wallace at the Great American Music Hall, San Francisco, May 1976)	Wallace	Bonnie Raitt	3:22
4.	"Under the Falling Sky"	Jackson Browne	Give It Up	3:38
5.	"Love Me Like a Man"	Chris Smither	Give It Up	3:10
6.	"Love Has No Pride"	Eric Kaz; Libby Titus	Give It Up	3:43
7.	"I Feel the Same"	Chris Smither	Takin' My Time (1973)	4:39
8.	"Guilty"	Randy Newman	Takin' My Time	2:58
9.	"Angel from Montgomery" (edited live duet with John Prine at the Arie Crown Theater, Chicago, January 1985)	Prine	Streetlights (1974)	3:59
10.	"What Is Success"	Allen Toussaint	Streetlights	3:26
11.	"My First Night Alone Without You"	Kin Vassy	Home Plate (1975)	3:01
12.	"Sugar Mama"	Glen Clark	Home Plate	3:44
13.	"Louise"	Paul Siebel	Sweet Forgiveness (1977)	2:43
14.	"About To Make Me Leave Home"	Earl Randall	Sweet Forgiveness	4:11
15.	"Runaway"	Max Crook; Del Shannon	Sweet Forgiveness	3:53
16.	"The Glow"	Veyler Hildebrand	The Glow (1979)	4:08
17.	"(Goin') Wild for You Baby"	David Batteau; Tom Snow	The Glow	5:26
18.	"Willya Wontcha"	Johnny Lee Schell	Green Light (1982)	3:21
19.	"True Love Is Hard to Find"	Frederick Hibbert	Nine Lives (1986)	3:37
20.	"No Way to Treat a Lady"	Bryan Adams; Jim Vallance	Nine Lives	3:52
Total length:				75:16

All track information and credits taken from the album's liner notes.

== Charts and certifications ==
Chart (1990)	Peak position
US Billboard 200	61

Region	Certification	Certified units/sales
United States (RIAA)	Gold	500,000^{^}
^{^} Shipments figures based on certification alone.
