= Nick of Time (album) =

Studio album by Bonnie Raitt
- Released: March 21, 1989
- Recorded: 1988
- Studios: Ocean Way Recording, Capitol Studios and Hollywood Sound Recorders (Hollywood, California); Record Plant (Los Angeles, California)
- Genres: Americana; rock; blues rock
- Length: 42:31
- Label: Capitol
- Producer: Don Was

Bonnie Raitt chronology
| Nine Lives (1986) | Nick of Time (1989) | Luck of the Draw (1991) |

Singles from Nick of Time
- 1. "Thing Called Love" Released: 1989; 2. "Have a Heart" Released: 1990; 3. "Nick of Time" Released: 1990; 4. "Love Letter" Released: 1990

Nick of Time is the tenth studio album by the American singer Bonnie Raitt, released on March 21, 1989. It was Raitt's first album released by Capitol Records. A commercial breakthrough after years of personal and professional struggles, Nick of Time topped the Billboard 200 chart, selling five million copies, and won three Grammy Awards, including Album of the Year, which was presented to Raitt and producer Don Was. In 2003, the album was ranked number 229 on Rolling Stone magazine's list of the 500 greatest albums of all time, then was re-ranked at number 230 on the 2012 list. As of September 2020, it is ranked at number 492. The album was also included in the book 1001 Albums You Must Hear Before You Die. In 2022, the album was selected by the Library of Congress for preservation in the United States National Recording Registry for being "culturally, historically, or aesthetically significant".

== Background ==
In 1983, Bonnie Raitt was dropped from Warner Bros. Records after the poor commercial performance of her albums The Glow (1979) and Green Light (1982). This decision came just one day after she had finished recording her next album, titled Tongue in Groove. Two years later, Raitt's affair with producer Rob Fraboni came to an end, and she was forced to dissolve her backing band as she could no longer afford to pay them. In addition to these personal problems, Warner Bros. exercised an option in Raitt's former contract to distribute Tongue in Groove in 1986, now re-titled Nine Lives. This meant that Raitt was now both legally obligated to promote a record she had no control over and split the profits with a label that had already abandoned her. Raitt began to suffer from depression, which soon spiraled into excessive eating, drinking, and partying. When asked about this period in her life, Raitt said: "I wasn't kicking and screaming into dementia, but I did have a complete emotional, physical, and spiritual breakdown."

While touring for Nine Lives, Raitt's luck unexpectedly changed. Pop star Prince (who had also been signed to Warner Bros.) was a fan of Raitt and attended her performance at the Beverly Theater in Los Angeles. After learning that she had no contract, he asked her to join his label Paisley Park Records. Raitt agreed and traveled to Minneapolis. Before she recorded any material however, she suffered a skiing accident and was hospitalized for two months. The injury gave her time to reflect on recent life choices. "It seemed that some changes needed to be made. I looked at myself and just felt I wasn't being the best version of me as I could. I wasn't going to blame anyone other than myself." Raitt attended Alcoholics Anonymous meetings, which she credits with giving her a new outlook on life.

Despite her newfound sobriety, Raitt was still in financial trouble. She left Paisley Park Records after Prince failed to come through with the new album she wanted. With no money for backing musicians, Raitt resorted to playing acoustic versions of her songs at concerts. It was during this period that she met musician Don Was of the band Was (Not Was). They collaborated on the song "Baby Mine" for the 1988 album Stay Awake: Various Interpretations of Music from Vintage Disney Films, which featured contemporary interpretations of songs from Disney films. Raitt enjoyed working with Was, and chose him to produce her next album. Financing the new record proved more difficult, as many labels felt Raitt no longer had commercial viability. Co-manager Danny Goldberg said at least fourteen executives passed on Raitt before Tim Devine of Capitol Records took an interest. In 1988, Raitt signed a recording contract with Capitol for $150,000.

== Composition ==
Nick of Time features a smooth and understated rock sound. Stephen Thomas Erlewine of AllMusic wrote: "[Raitt] never rocks too hard, but there is grit to her singing and playing, even when the surfaces are clean and inviting." There are many genres explored in Nick of Time, including blues rock, country, R&B, and pop. When Was was announced as the producer, some listeners wondered if he would instill a funk rock sound into the album, given his reputation with Was (Not Was). Instead, the album was built around the laid-back blues rock sound Raitt had developed earlier in her career. According to Raitt: "There's less production, less slickness. Basically, it's a return to my roots."

Before Raitt signed with Capitol Records, she and Was had recorded some early demos at Was' home studio. These early demos focused on music that was stripped down, similar to how Raitt had arranged her songs for the past few years. Was wanted to showcase her musical talents by choosing songs that worked without a backing band. These demos were then properly recorded over the course of a week at Ocean Way Recording in Los Angeles on preparation for the album's release. Because they had already worked on the songs, recording sessions were fairly quick. About two tracks were recorded a day. Engineer Ed Cherney noted how most of the music was recorded live in studio as opposed to recording each instrument individually. This was because Raitt was comfortable jamming with other musicians.

Many of the songs deal with personal issues Raitt was struggling with at the time. For example, Raitt was almost forty years old when Nick of Time was released, and the album's title track is about coming to terms with middle age. According to biographer Mark Bego, Raitt sought to make an album for the baby boomer generation. "Unlike her past releases, there were no 'you've done me wrong' songs or tearful laments about love lost. The songs were much more personal" said Bego. Nick of Time features two original songs and nine cover songs.

== Release ==
Nick of Time was released on March 21, 1989. Devine was unable to convince Capitol Records' marketing team to promote Raitt, and instead had to ask the president of the company to put full-page ads in music magazines. Despite the limited promotion, Nick of Time sold very well for the first few months, and quickly became the best selling album of Raitt's career. It debuted at number 105 on the Billboard 200, and slowly climbed the chart until peaking at number 1 on April 6, 1990. The seventeen and a half year stretch between Raitt's first album to chart on the Billboard 200–Give It Up in 1972–and Nick of Time broke the record for the longest period of time it took an artist to have a number 1 album. By 2019, Nick of Time had sold over five million copies, and helped revitalize Raitt's career. When asked why Nick of Time sold as well as it did, publicist Joan Myers said: "Bonnie's personality and sincerity just won people's hearts, in addition to her music. There was nothing ever pretentious about her."

Bego identifies the music video for "Thing Called Love" as an important factor to the commercial success of Nick of Time. With the rise of MTV and VH1 in the 1980s, the decision to film a video helped expose Raitt to a younger generation of listeners. In the video, Raitt performs in a bar and flirts with a patron played by Dennis Quaid. "Thing Called Love" was one of three singles from Nick of Time; the other two were "Love Letter" and "Have a Heart," the latter of which reached number 49 on the Billboard Hot 100. "Have a Heart" was included in the soundtrack for the 1990 film Heart Condition.

== Reception ==
Professional ratings
Review scores
| Source | Rating |
|---|---|
| AllMusic | 4.5/5 stars |
| Chicago Sun-Times | 4/4 stars |
| Chicago Tribune | 3/4 stars |
| Entertainment Weekly | A |
| Los Angeles Times | 3/5 stars |
| NME | 8/10 |
| Pitchfork | 8.2/10 |
| Rolling Stone | 3.5/5 stars |
| The Rolling Stone Album Guide | 4/5 stars |
| The Village Voice | B |

In 2003, Nick of Time was ranked number 229 on Rolling Stone magazine's list of the 500 greatest albums of all time. It was ranked number 230 on the 2012 edition of the list, and number 492 on the 2020 edition. The record was voted number 615 in the third edition of Colin Larkin's All Time Top 1000 Albums (2000), and was also included in the book 1001 Albums You Must Hear Before You Die.

In 2022, the Library of Congress selected Nick of Time for preservation in the United States National Recording Registry as a "culturally, historically, or aesthetically significant" work.

== Track listing ==
Nick of Time
| No. | Title | Writer(s) | Length |
|---|---|---|---|
| 1. | "Nick of Time" | Bonnie Raitt | 3:52 |
| 2. | "Thing Called Love" | John Hiatt | 3:52 |
| 3. | "Love Letter" | Bonnie Hayes | 4:04 |
| 4. | "Cry on My Shoulder" | Michael Ruff | 3:44 |
| 5. | "Real Man" | Jerry Lynn Williams | 4:27 |
| 6. | "Nobody's Girl" | Larry John McNally | 3:14 |
| 7. | "Have a Heart" | Bonnie Hayes | 4:50 |
| 8. | "Too Soon to Tell" | Rory Michael Bourke; Mike Reid | 3:45 |
| 9. | "I Will Not Be Denied" | Williams | 4:55 |
| 10. | "I Ain't Gonna Let You Break My Heart Again" | David Lasley; Julie Lasley | 2:38 |
| 11. | "The Road's My Middle Name" | Raitt | 3:31 |
| Total length: | | | 42:31 |

== Personnel ==
- Bonnie Raitt – vocals, electric piano (1, 9), slide guitar (2–4), guitars (5, 6, 11), backing vocals (5)
- Scott Thurston – keyboards (3, 7)
- Michael Ruff – keyboards (4)
- Jerry Lynn Williams – acoustic piano (5)
- Don Was – keyboards (8)
- Herbie Hancock – acoustic piano (10)
- Michael Landau – guitars (1, 3)
- Johnny Lee Schell – acoustic guitar (2), backing vocals (2), guitars (3, 9)
- Arthur Adams – guitars (3)
- John Jorgenson – guitars (8)
- Jay Dee Maness – pedal steel guitar (8)
- James "Hutch" Hutchinson – bass guitar (1–3, 5, 7–9)
- Chuck Domanico – acoustic bass (4, 6)
- Preston Hubbard – bass guitar (11)
- Ricky Fataar – drums (1–3, 5, 7–9), percussion (1)
- Fran Christina – drums (11)
- Paulinho da Costa – congas (1), percussion (4, 7)
- Tony Braunagel – percussion (2, 5), timbales (2), drums (4)
- Marty Grebb – tenor saxophone (3, 9)
- Heart Attack Horns – horns (3, 9)
  - Bill Bergman – saxophones
  - Greg Smith – saxophones
  - John Berry Jr. – trumpet
  - Dennis Farias – trumpet
- Kim Wilson – harmonica (5, 11)
- Sir Harry Bowens – backing vocals (1, 3, 8, 9, 11)
- Arnold McCuller – backing vocals (1, 7, 8, 11)
- Sweet Pea Atkinson – backing vocals (3, 8, 9, 11)
- David Crosby – backing vocals (4)
- Graham Nash – backing vocals (4)
- Larry John McNally – backing vocals (5)
- David Lasley – backing vocals (7)

Production

- Don Was – producer
- Ed Cherney – recording, mixing
- Clark Germain – recording assistant, mix assistant
- Vincent Leslie Jones – recording assistant, mix assistant
- Jim Mitchell – recording assistant, mix assistant
- Charlie Paakkari – recording assistant, mix assistant
- Martin Schmelzle – recording assistant, mix assistant
- Tommy Steele – art direction
- Larry Vigon Studio – design
- Deborah Frankel – photography
- Gina Furth – hair
- Paul Starr – make-up
- Danny Goldberg – management
- Ron Stone – management

== Charts and certifications ==
=== Weekly charts ===
| Chart (1989–1990) | Peak position |
|---|---|
| Australian Albums (ARIA) | 58 |
| Canada Top Albums/CDs (RPM) | 4 |
| Dutch Albums (Album Top 100) | 65 |
| German Albums (Offizielle Top 100) | 68 |
| UK Albums (Official Charts) | 51 |
| US Billboard 200 | 1 |

=== Year-end charts ===
| Chart (1990) | Position |
|---|---|
| Canada Top Albums/CDs (RPM) | 34 |
| US Billboard 200 | 16 |

=== Certifications ===
| Region | Certification | Certified units/sales |
|---|---|---|
| Canada (Music Canada) | 3× Platinum | 300,000^{^} |
| United States (RIAA) | 5× Platinum | 5,000,000^{^} |
^{^} Shipments figures based on certification alone.

== Awards ==
Grammy Awards of 1990

| Year | Winner | Category |
|---|---|---|
| 1990 | Nick of Time | Album Of The Year |
| 1990 | Nick of Time | Best Female Rock Vocal Performance |
| 1990 | "Nick of Time" | Best Female Pop Vocal Performance |
