= Dirge (Bob Dylan song) =

Song by Bob Dylan

from the album Planet Waves
- Released: January 17, 1974
- Recorded: November 14, 1973
- Genre: Folk rock
- Length: 5:36
- Label: Asylum
- Songwriter: Bob Dylan
- Producer: Rob Fraboni

"Dirge" is a song by Bob Dylan. It was released on his 14th studio album Planet Waves in 1974. Notable for its acidic tone, "Dirge" has never been performed in concert.

A 2021 Guardian article included it on a list of "80 Bob Dylan songs everyone should know".

== Background and recording ==
After recalling his band to re-record the track "Forever Young," Dylan recorded "Dirge" on just the second take. The song was labeled on the studio tape box as "Dirge for Martha." After performing one take with an acoustic guitar, Dylan switched to a piano when he performed the second and final take. Robbie Robertson played acoustic guitar on the second take, giving the song a bluesy and mandolin-like feel. According to Rob Fraboni, the producer, Dylan "wanted a kind of barroom sound from the piano" and a "raunchy vocal sound." Fraboni and Robertson mixed the song immediately after the recording.

== Personnel ==
- Bob Dylan – piano, vocals
- Robbie Robertson – acoustic guitar
