= On a Night Like This (Bob Dylan song) =

Single by Bob Dylan

from the album Planet Waves
- B-side: "Forever Young" (UK); "You Angel You" (US)
- Released: February 15, 1974 (UK); March 7, 1974 (US)
- Recorded: November 8, 1973
- Studio: The Village Recorder, West Los Angeles, California
- Genre: Roots rock
- Length: 2:57
- Label: Asylum
- Songwriter: Bob Dylan
- Producer: Rob Fraboni

Bob Dylan singles chronology
"A Fool Such as I" (1973)	"On a Night Like This" (1974)	"Something There Is About You" (1974)

"On a Night Like This" is a song written by Bob Dylan and recorded in November 1973. It first appeared on Dylan's 14th studio album, Planet Waves, as the opening track. It was also released as the lead single from the album and reached #44 on the Billboard Hot 100 The song later appeared on several Dylan compilation albums including Biograph, in 1985, and Dylan (three-disc version), in 2007.

== Recording ==
The song was written in New York a month before the first recording session at the Village Recorder. Dylan and The Band recorded the song ten times, the tenth being used on the album. Dylan plays his harmonica solo in the key of F. As of 2026, Dylan has never performed the song live in concert.

== Lyrics and music ==
According to Dylan, "On a Night Like This" was not a typical song for him to write, saying that it "comes off as sort of like a drunk man who's temporarily sober." Dylan biographer Clinton Heylin found the song a disappointing start to Planet Waves. However, he did acknowledge some positive features: that "playing swings" and that Dylan is in good voice. He also acknowledges some clever lyrics. For example, he sees in the lines:

Build a fire, throw on logs
And listen to it hiss
And let it burn, burn, burn, burn

a clever take on Jack Kerouac's use of the phrase "burn, burn, burn" in On the Road in which Dylan's meaning is the opposite of Kerouac's. He also finds amusement in Dylan's reference to Fats Domino and Dylan's own "The Man in Me" in the lines:

Let the four winds blow
Around this old cabin door

Author Oliver Trager noted the "rustic" feel resulting from the "twangy, loose musicianship" and that song produces visceral effects in allowing the listener to feel the window frost and smell the burning wood described in the song. Trager particularly praises Dylan's harmonica and Garth Hudson's accordion playing.

== Reception ==
Allmusic critic Stephen Thomas Erlewine rates the song's "unassuming nature" as a "virtue". Billboard described the song as "a spunky tune about reminiscences and things that sure feel right" and stated that Dylan's vocal performance sounded strained. Cash Box called it a "lively track" saying "strong, usual vocal by the master is backed by even stronger musical representation by The Band with a heavy concentration on harp." Record World called it a "jaunty gem" and said that the "vocals have a touch of 'old' Dylan about them" and that "the accompaniment can't be beat." PopMatters critic David Pike rated it one of the "41 essential pop/rock songs with accordion," calling it "a rollicking, zydeco-tinged workout with an intense outro duet for Garth Hudson’s accordion and Dylan’s harmonica."

== Personnel ==
Credits for the Planet Waves and single release, adapted from the Bob Dylan All the Songs: The Story Behind Every Track book.

Musicians

- Bob Dylan (vocals, guitar, harmonica)
- Robbie Robertson (guitar)
- Richard Manuel (keyboard)
- Garth Hudson (accordion)
- Rick Danko (bass guitar)
- Levon Helm (drums)

Technical

- Producers: Bob Dylan, Robbie Robertson, Rob Fraboni
- Sound Engineer: Rob Fraboni

== Cover versions ==
Los Lobos recorded a version of the song for the soundtrack of the 2003 film Masked and Anonymous. Buckwheat Zydeco covered the song on his 1987 album On a Night Like This. Jimmy Fallon also played "On a Night Like This" with Buckwheat Zydeco on the last night of Late Night with Jimmy Fallon.
