= Love Sneakin' Up On You =

1994 single by Bonnie Raitt

Single by Bonnie Raitt

from the album Longing in Their Hearts
- B-side: "Hell to Pay"
- Released: March 1994
- Genre: Rock; blues; pop
- Length: 3:39
- Label: Capitol; EMI
- Songwriters: Jimmy Scott; Tom Snow
- Producers: Don Was; Bonnie Raitt

Bonnie Raitt singles chronology
| "All at Once" (1993) | "Love Sneakin' Up On You" (1994) | "You" (1994) |

Music video
- "Love Sneakin' Up On You" on YouTube

"Love Sneakin' Up On You" is a song by American blues singer Bonnie Raitt. Released in March 1994 by Capitol and EMI Records from her 12th album, Longing in Their Hearts (1994), the song topped Canada's RPM 100 Hit Tracks chart for three weeks and reached number 19 on the US Billboard Hot 100. The song also charted in Germany and the United Kingdom. In 1995, it was nominated for both the Grammy Award for Record of the Year and the Grammy Award for Best Female Rock Vocal Performance. Irish director Meiert Avis directed the song's music video, which was nominated for Best Clip of the Year in the category for Pop/AC at the 1994 Billboard Music Video Awards.

== Critical reception ==
Larry Flick from Billboard magazine described the song as "a familiar, uptempo stomper that rides on the strength of her well-worn vocal style and funky instrumentation." He added, "With so few things to count on in life, it's comforting to know that you can always rely on Raitt to serve up a tasty blend of well-lubed guitar licks over a steamy blues/pop ditty. Watch her friends at top 40, album rock, and AC radio gobble this one up within moments." Fell and Rufer from the Gavin Report wrote, "Bonnie gets up and down with this funky preface to her next album, Longing in Their Hearts. How great it is to have a beat-driven fresh track from one of our format's icons." Pan-European magazine Music & Media stated, "This mid-tempo rocker with a hell of a slide guitar proves that truck loads of Grammy awards couldn't kill the beast inside."

== Personnel ==
- Bonnie Raitt: Vocals, slide guitar
- George Marinelli: Electric guitar
- Scott Thurston: Keyboards
- James "Hutch" Hutchinson: Bass
- Ricky Fataar: Drums
- Paulino Da Costa: Percussion
- Sweet Pea Atikinson, Sir Harry Bowens, David Lasley, Arnold McCuller: Backing vocals

== Track listings ==
- US 7-inch and cassette single; Japanese mini-CD single
1. "Love Sneakin' Up On You" – 3:39
2. "Hell to Pay" – 4:02
- European CD single
1. "Love Sneakin' Up On You" – 3:39
2. "Nick of Time" – 3:52
3. "Baby Mine" – 3:14
4. "Hell to Pay" – 4:02

== Charts ==
=== Weekly charts ===
| Chart (1994) | Peak position |
|---|---|
| Canada Top Singles (RPM) | 1 |
| Canada Adult Contemporary (RPM) | 1 |
| Europe (European Hit Radio) | 39 |
| Germany (GfK) | 71 |
| Scottish Singles Sales (Official Charts) | 90 |
| UK Singles (Official Charts) | 69 |
| US Billboard Hot 100 | 19 |
| US Adult Contemporary (Billboard) | 2 |
| US Mainstream Rock (Billboard) | 25 |
| US Pop Airplay (Billboard) | 15 |
| US Cash Box Top 100 | 10 |

=== Year-end charts ===
| Chart (1994) | Position |
|---|---|
| Canada Top Singles (RPM) | 14 |
| Canada Adult Contemporary (RPM) | 26 |
| US Billboard Hot 100 | 94 |
| US Adult Contemporary (Billboard) | 15 |

== Release history ==
| Region | Date | Format(s) | Label(s) | Ref. |
|---|---|---|---|---|
| United States | February 28, 1994 | Top 40; adult contemporary; album rock; album alternative radio | Capitol | |
| United States | March 1994 | 7-inch vinyl; cassette | Capitol | |
| United Kingdom | March 28, 1994 | CD; cassette | Capitol; EMI | |
| Japan | March 30, 1994 | Mini-CD | EMI Japan | |
| Australia | April 11, 1994 | CD; cassette | Capitol | |
