= Lou Courtney =

American soul singer and songwriter (1943–2021)

- Also known as: Louis Pegues; Lew Courtney
- Born: Louis Russell Pegues; August 15, 1943; Buffalo, New York, United States
- Died: June 25, 2021 (aged 77)
- Genres: Soul, pop, funk
- Occupations: Singer, songwriter, record producer
- Years active: 1962–1980s
- Labels: Imperial, Riverside, Pop-Side, Verve, Epic, RCA, others

Lou Courtney (born Louis Russell Pegues, August 15, 1943 – June 25, 2021) was an American soul singer and songwriter who had several hit records in the 1960s and 1970s, both as a performer and writer.

== Biography ==
Born in Buffalo, New York, he graduated from Hutchinson Central Technical High School in 1962. As Lew Courtney, he first recorded for Imperial Records the same year. He also worked in New York City as a songwriter, using his birth name, Louis Pegues, and wrote for Chubby Checker as well as Mary Wells' 1964 hit "Ain't It the Truth". With Dennis Lambert, he co-wrote the pop songs "Find My Way Back Home" for the Nashville Teens, "Do the Freddie" for Freddie and the Dreamers, and "Up and Down" recorded by the McCoys. He also worked as Lorraine Ellison's recording director, and produced Betty Mabry's first single, "The Cellar".

In 1966, he signed for Riverside Records, and as Lou Courtney recorded the first in a series of dance-based songs. His first chart hit came with "Skate Now", which reached number 13 on the Billboard R&B chart and number 71 on the Hot 100 in 1967, and was followed by "Do the Thing" (#17 R&B, #80 pop). He released a series of singles on Riverside and its subsidiary Pop-Side label in the late 1960s, including two more R&B chart hits, "You Ain't Ready" and "Hey Joyce"; several tracks later regarded as classics on the British Northern soul scene such as "Me & You Doing the Boogaloo" and "If the Shoe Fits", together with an album, Skate Now - Shing-A-Ling. His recordings covered ballads and mainstream soul tracks, as well as funk. Most of his songs of the period were co-written and produced with Robert Bateman, who had previously been the co-writer and co-producer of the Marvelettes' "Please Mr. Postman" at Motown.

Courtney left Pop-Side in 1968 and released singles on various other labels including Verve ("Do the Horse", 1968), Buddah ("Let Me Turn You On", 1969), and Hurdy-Gurdy ("Hot Butter 'N All", 1971). However, he failed to reach the charts until he joined Epic Records in 1973, when, working with producer Jerry Ragovoy, he had further R&B chart entries with "What Do You Want Me To Do" and "I Don't Need Anybody Else", both self-penned songs. He also released an album, I’m In Need of Love, and appeared on Bonnie Raitt's 1974 album, Streetlights, which Ragovoy produced.

He formed a band, Buffalo Smoke, who released several singles, including a funk version of "Stubborn Kind of Fella", and an album on RCA Records in 1976. In 1978, Courtney briefly became a member of The 5th Dimension, replacing Danny Beard, and featured on their Motown album High On Sunshine. Subsequently, he has made occasional one-off live appearances.

In 2016 it was reported that Courtney was living in New York City, following a stroke. He died in 2021, aged 77.

== Discography ==
=== Chart singles ===
Year	Single	Chart Positions	
Year	Single	US Pop	US R&B
1967	"Skate Now"	71	13
1967	"Do the Thing"	80	17
1967	"You Ain't Ready"	-	46
1967	"Hey Joyce"	-	43
1973	"What Do You Want Me To Do"	-	48
1974	"I Don't Need Nobody Else"	-	67

=== Albums ===
- Skate Now - Shing-A-Ling (Riverside, 1967)
- I’m In Need of Love (Epic, 1974)
- Buffalo Smoke (RCA, 1976)
