= Let Me In (The Sensations song) =

Single by The Sensations

from the album Let Me In
- B-side: "Oh Yes I'll Be True"
- Released: November 1961
- Genre: R&B
- Length: 3:07
- Label: Argo
- Songwriter: Yvonne Baker

"Let Me In" is the name of a 1961 song with music and lyrics by Yvonne Baker, recorded the same year by Baker and The Sensations, which went to No. 2 on the US R&B singles chart and No. 4 on the U.S. Billboard Hot 100 singles chart. It reached number 5 in New Zealand on the lever hits parade chart. It was the group's highest charting and most successful single. "Let Me In" may be most memorable for its repetitive "weeoo" refrain in the chorus.

== Cover versions ==
- Bonnie Raitt included it on her 1973 album Takin' My Time.

== In popular culture ==
- It was heard in the 2003 movie Secondhand Lions.
- Cadillac utilized the song for a television commercial in 2018.
