= Keep This Heart in Mind =

Single by Bonnie Raitt

from the album Green Light
- Released: March 1982
- Genre: Rock
- Length: 3:19
- Label: Warner
- Songwriter: Fred Marrone/Steve Holsapple
- Producer: Rob Fraboni

Bonnie Raitt singles chronology
"You're Gonna Get What's Coming" (1980)	"Keep This Heart in Mind" (1982)	"No Way to Treat a Lady" (1986)

"Keep This Heart in Mind" is a song recorded by Bonnie Raitt in 1981, for her 1982 album Green Light. It was the first of only 2 singles released from the LP. The song was written by Fred Marrone/Steve Holsapple.

In the U.S., "Keep This Heart in Mind" peaked at number 104 on the Billboard Bubbling Under the Hot 100 singles chart and number 39 on the Top Rock Tracks chart.

== Charts ==
Chart (1982)	Peak position
US Billboard Bubbling Under the Hot 100	104
US Mainstream Rock (Billboard)	39
