= The Sensations =

American doo-wop group

The Sensations were an American doo-wop group from Philadelphia, Pennsylvania.

The group formed in 1954 under the name the Cavaliers, soon after changing to the Sensations. The group scored two hits on the US R&B chart in 1956 with the Atco Records singles "Yes Sir That's My Baby" (No. 15) and "Please Mr. Disc Jockey" (No. 13). By 1957 they were managed by Kae Williams. The group disbanded soon afterwards, and lead singer Yvonne Mills married and started a family.

In 1961, bass singer Alphonso Howell persuaded Yvonne Mills Baker that the group should re-form, and they won a contract with Chess Records subsidiary label Argo. They soon had a hit with a version of "Music, Music, Music", which reached No. 12 on the R&B chart and No. 54 on the Billboard Hot 100. A few months later, they released the tune "Let Me In". It was their biggest success, peaking at No. 2 R&B and No. 4 on the Hot 100. However, later releases were less successful and the group broke up.

Yvonne Baker later started a solo career, recording a number of tracks that achieved cult status among Northern soul fans, most notably "You Didn't Say a Word" on Parkway Records in 1966.

Alphonso Howell died on May 7, 1998, at the age of 61. Sam Armstrong died on July 11, 2017. Yvonne Mills Baker died on May 3, 2020.

== Members ==
Early members

- Yvonne Mills Baker (February 15, 1933 – May 3, 2020)
- Tommy Wicks
- Alphonso Howell (1937 – 1998)
- Hosea Haralson

Later members

- Yvonne Mills Baker
- Alphonso Howell
- Richard Curtain
- Sam Armstrong (died 2017)
