= Planet Waves =

Studio album by Bob Dylan
- Released: January 17, 1974
- Recorded: November 2–14, 1973
- Studios: Village Recorder, West Los Angeles, California
- Genre: Roots rock
- Length: 42:12
- Labels: Asylum; Columbia Records (reissue)
- Producer: Rob Fraboni

Bob Dylan chronology
Dylan (1973)	Planet Waves (1974)	Before the Flood (1974)

Bob Dylan studio album chronology
Dylan (1973)	Planet Waves (1974)	Blood on the Tracks (1975)

The Band chronology
Moondog Matinee (1973)	Planet Waves (1974)	Before the Flood (1974)

Singles from Planet Waves
- 1. "On a Night Like This" Released: January 1974; 2. "Something There Is About You" Released: April 1974

Planet Waves is the fourteenth studio album by American singer-songwriter Bob Dylan, released on January 17, 1974, by Asylum Records in the United States and Island Records in the United Kingdom.

Dylan is supported on the album by longtime collaborators the Band, with whom he embarked on a major reunion tour (documented on the 1974 live album Before the Flood, and then The Live 1974 Recordings box set and sampler, released in 2024). With a successful tour and a host of publicity, Planet Waves was a hit, enjoying a brief stay at No. 1 on the US Billboard charts—a first for the artist—and No. 7 in the UK. Reviews were generally positive; critics were not as negative as they had been with some then-recent Bob Dylan albums (namely Self Portrait and Dylan) but some were still not enthusiastic for the album's brand of laid-back roots rock, but it was nevertheless considered a significant improvement over those albums.

The album was originally set to be titled Ceremonies of the Horsemen, a reference to the song "Love Minus Zero/No Limit", from the 1965 album Bringing It All Back Home; the release was delayed two weeks when Dylan decided to change the title at the last minute. Another, earlier, working title was Wedding Song.

== Artwork ==
The cover art is drawn by Dylan himself. Written on the right side of the cover image is the phrase "Cast-iron songs & torch ballads", apparently signaling Dylan's own conception of the album. On the left side is written "Moonglow", which is sometimes interpreted as a subtitle. The original back artwork for the album is handwritten, with a long, rambling essay on the left-hand side. In the center, the performers' names are listed, though Richard Manuel's surname is misspelled "Manual". The initial release also included an insert, which reportedly set out excerpts from Dylan's personal journals.

== Recording ==
In the summer of 1973, Robbie Robertson, lead guitarist of the Band, relocated to Malibu, California, not far from Dylan's residence. According to Robertson, the idea of collaborating with Dylan evolved from a conversation that took place sometime after July 28, when the Band played to hundreds of thousands of people at Summer Jam at Watkins Glen in upstate New York. After much discussion about that experience, the idea of touring again "seemed to really make sense," says Robertson. "It was a good idea, a kind of step into the past...The other guys in the Band came out [to Malibu] and we went right to work."

Dylan had not toured since 1966, when the Band accompanied him as The Hawks. In the interim, he had played with the Band on a number of occasions, most recently a New Year's concert in 1971/1972 that was received warmly by the audience. When Dylan joined the Band for a test run at Robertson's home in September 1973, he was satisfied with the results, enough to proceed with touring plans.

"We sat down and played for four hours and ran over an incredible number of tunes", recalls Robertson. "Bob would ask us to play certain tunes of ours, and then we would do the same, then we'd think of some that we would particularly like to do."

Dylan left for New York in October to compose new material for album sessions scheduled in November. He already had three songs ("Forever Young", "Nobody 'Cept You" and "Never Say Goodbye") which he had demoed in June, and when he returned to Malibu after twenty days in New York, he had six more.

On Friday, November 2, Dylan and the Band held a session at Village Recorder Studio B in Los Angeles, California. Engineer Rob Fraboni recalls the proceedings as fairly relaxed and informal, an opportunity "to get set up and to get a feel for the studio." Drummer Levon Helm was not even present, as he was still in transit, on his way to Los Angeles from the East Coast. Nevertheless, the session was devoted to all three songs demoed in June, and Dylan and the Band succeeded in recording complete takes of "Forever Young" and "Nobody 'Cept You" as well as the master take for "Never Say Goodbye".

When Dylan and the Band reconvened at Village Recorder the following Monday, November 5, with Levon Helm now present, they made another attempt at "Nobody 'Cept You". Robertson abandoned the wah-wah pedal used during the November 2 session, and a satisfactory take was completed and marked for possible inclusion. Master takes for "You Angel You" and "Going, Going, Gone" were also completed.

"Forever Young" occupied a portion of the Monday session, but the results were not to Dylan's satisfaction. He returned to it for three more sessions, as it proved to be the most difficult song to record.

On the next day, November 6, Dylan and the Band recorded master takes for three more songs: "Hazel", "Something There Is About You" and "Tough Mama".

They reconvened two days later, on November 8, performing three takes of "Going, Going, Gone" before recording "On A Night Like This". Attempts at the former would not replace the master take from the 5th, but a master take of the latter was successfully recorded. The session would then end with "Forever Young".

After several false starts, Dylan and the Band executed what would ultimately be one of two master takes for "Forever Young". However, Dylan nearly rejected the performance after hearing some disparaging criticism from one particular visitor.

"We only did one [complete] take of the slow version of 'Forever Young'," recalls Fraboni. "This take was so riveting, it was so powerful, so immediate, I couldn't get over it. When everyone came in nobody really said anything. I rewound the tape and played it back and everybody listened to it from beginning to end and then when it was over everybody sort of just wandered out of the room. There was no outward discussion. Everybody just left. There was just [a friend] and I sitting there. I was so overwhelmed I said, 'Let's go for a walk.' We went for a walk and came back and I said, 'Let's go listen to that again.' We were like one minute or two into it, I was so mesmerized by it again I didn't even notice that Bob had come into the room...So when we were assembling the master reel I was getting ready to put that [take] on the master reel. I didn't even ask. And Bob said, 'What're you doing with that? We're not gonna use that.' And I jumped up and said, 'What do you mean you're not gonna use that? You're crazy! Why?' Well,...during the recording...[Dylan's childhood friend] Lou Kemp and this girl came by and she had made a crack to him: 'C'mon, Bob. What! Are you getting mushy in your old age?' It was based on her comment that he wanted to leave [that version] off the record."

Fraboni would defend the recording, and when he refused to relent, Dylan reconsidered and allowed him to include it on the album. Fraboni also convinced Dylan to do his first vocal overdubs for the album. (Although the Band had three regular vocalists—Richard Manuel, Rick Danko, and Helm—none of them sing on the album.)

On November 9, Dylan held what he intended to be the final session for the album. From Fraboni's perspective, Dylan already had a perfect take of "Forever Young" from the previous day, but Dylan still attempted a different, acoustic arrangement, which was ultimately rejected. Dylan would tell Fraboni that afternoon, "I been carrying this song around in my head for five years and I never wrote it down and now I come to record it I just can't decide how to do it."

The last song recorded on the 9th was a new composition titled "Wedding Song", which Dylan had completed over the course of the sessions. "Nobody 'Cept You" was originally planned as the album's closing number, but without a satisfactory performance, it would be omitted and replaced by "Wedding Song" (The November 2 recording of "Nobody 'Cept You" was eventually released in 1991 on The Bootleg Series Volumes 1–3 (Rare & Unreleased) 1961–1991). Though there was enough material to fill an album, Dylan decided to hold one more session. On the 14th, the Band was called back to record two songs. The first was another arrangement of "Forever Young", this time with Helm on mandolin and Danko on fiddle. This new version of "Forever Young" would create the second of two master takes for the song, and both of them would be included on the album.

The second song recorded on the 14th was "Dirge" (or "Dirge For Martha" as it was marked on the recording sheet). "Bob went out and played the piano while we were mixing [the album]. All of a sudden, he came in and said, 'I'd like to try 'Dirge' on the piano.'...We put up a tape and he said to Robbie, 'Maybe you could play guitar on this.' They did it once, Bob playing piano and singing, and Robbie playing acoustic guitar. The second time was the take."

== Songs ==
Critic Bill Wyman described Planet Waves via Salon.com as "a spare but twisted collection of songs". As a whole, they deal with domestic themes with a few tracks seeming like straightforward love songs, particularly the opener "On A Night Like This" and "You Angel You" (which Dylan dismissed in 1985 as having "dummy lyrics"). However, as music critic Tim Riley notes, many of the songs take on darker overtones, with lyrics suggesting "death ('Dirge'), suicide ('Going, Going, Gone', a song that doesn't toy around with the idea), and the brick wall that love collides with when possessiveness curdles into obsession (the overstated contradictions of 'Wedding Song')." Unlike the "settled-in homilies" of Nashville Skyline and New Morning, Planet Waves is "rounded out with more than one shade of romance: subterfuge, suspicion, self-hate ('Dirge', 'Tough Mama'), and memory ('Something There Is About You') counter lighthearted celebration ('On A Night Like This')."

Many critics gave the performances on Planet Waves plenty of attention, perhaps more than the songs themselves. Dylan and the Band had performed on numerous occasions, most notably on tour in 1966 and during the "Basement Tapes" sessions of 1967, but at the time of Planet Waves's release, very few of these performances were officially released.

"The Band's windup pitch to 'Going, Going, Gone' is a wonder of pinpoint ensemble playing", writes Riley. "Robertson makes his guitar entrance choke as if a noose had suddenly tightened around its neck, and you get the feeling these guys could shadow Dylan in their sleep." Riley also writes that "'Tough Mama' is the track that exemplifies the best playing on Planet Waves, and a pitch of writing that shows Dylan can still challenge himself." Clinton Heylin also singled out Dylan's performances, noting that "Tough Mama" featured "one of his raunchiest vocals".

Cash Box said of "Something There Is About You" that it is "strong on the lyric with fine backing from the Band and Bob's usual unique vocal performance." Record World called it "a somewhat cute (for Dylan) observation on such diverse topics as Duluth, Ruth and truth."

Arguably the most celebrated song on Planet Waves, "Forever Young", was originally written for his children, and a demo recording from June 1973 (released on Biograph in 1985) explicitly shows this. As described by Heylin, the song is "an attempt to write something hymnal and heartfelt that spoke of the father in him." Though two different versions were released on the album, most critics and listeners defer to the "beautiful slow waltz of a performance" recorded on November 8 as the primary recording. It is not a waltz, it is in 4/4 time. Formally this song is a passacaglia, just as "Something There Is About You".

"Dirge", "his most twisted song since the accident", writes Heylin, "represents a quite astonishing catharsis on Dylan's part. As the narrator expresses an underlying hatred for 'the need that was expressed' by her presence, he encapsulates all the ambivalence this popular artist felt for both muse and audience." Critics also singled out Dylan's piano playing in praising the recording.

The closing number on Planet Waves is "Wedding Song", and over the years, a number of critics have called it autobiographical. "It begins with the narrator attempting to convince his lady love that he loves her 'more than life itself'," writes Heylin. "However, the focus begins to turn when he informs her, "we can't regain what went down in the flood." Dylan would, five months later in June 1974, release his first live album and call it Before the Flood, evidently referring to the concert reprises from his 60's material. By the sixth verse we have come to the crux of the song—the singer's protestation that it's never been his duty "to remake the world at large", nor is it his intention "to sound a battle charge" because he loves her 'more than all of that.'" Many critics have dismissed such claims of autobiographical content, making "Wedding Song" one of the more debated numbers on Planet Waves.

== Reception ==
Professional ratings
Review scores
Source	Rating
AllMusic	3.5/5 stars
Christgau's Record Guide	A−
The Encyclopedia of Popular Music	3/5 stars
Entertainment Weekly	C+
MusicHound Rock	3.5/5
The Rolling Stone Album Guide	3/5 stars
Tom Hull	B+

Planet Waves was Dylan's first album consisting entirely of new, original songs in three and a half years. With a planned tour to follow, his first since 1966 and backed by the same band that supported him on that tour, the media coverage was significant. Asylum Records had planned to release Planet Waves on the same day the tour began, but an album title change (from Ceremonies of the Horsemen) and a last-minute substitution in liner notes (also written by Dylan) pushed the release date back two weeks.

Planet Waves would ship gold, topping Billboard's album charts on the basis of advance orders, but by the end of 1974, it had sold a modest 600,000 copies, selling only 100,000 units after those initial orders were made. The figures were a surprise, considering the enormous success of the tour; it is estimated that $92 million worth of checks and money orders were sent in from roughly ten million ticket applicants.

The critical reception was generally positive, if a bit muted. The consensus was ultimately strong enough to secure Planet Waves at #18 on The Village Voice's Pazz & Jop Critics Poll for 1974. "In a time when all the most prestigious music, even what passes for funk, is coated with silicone grease, Dylan is telling us to take that grease and jam it", wrote critic Robert Christgau. "Sure he's domestic, but his version of conjugal love is anything but smug, and this comes through in both the lyrics and the sound of the record itself. Blissful, sometimes, but sometimes it sounds like stray cat music—scrawny, cocky, and yowling up the stairs."

Ellen Willis of The New Yorker wrote, "Planet Waves is unlike all other Dylan albums: it is openly personal...I think the subject of Planet Waves is what it appears to be—Dylan's aesthetic and practical dilemma, and his immense emotional debt to Sara."

Only "Tough Mama", "Something There is About You", "Forever Young" and "Wedding Song" were played on the tour (as well as a solo, acoustic rendition of the outtake, "Nobody 'Cept You"), and as the tour progressed, songs from the album were removed from the setlist. By the end of the tour, only "Forever Young" was left. In the meantime, Dylan and the Band professionally recorded many of the shows as they planned their next release. None of the Planet Waves songs were included on the subsequent Before the Flood live album, but many of the recordings can be heard on 2024's The 1974 Live Recordings.

== Track listing ==
All tracks are written by Bob Dylan.

Side one
No.	Title	Recorded	Length
1.	"On a Night Like This"	November 8, 1973	2:57
2.	"Going, Going, Gone"	November 5, 1973	3:27
3.	"Tough Mama"	November 6, 1973	4:17
4.	"Hazel"	November 6, 1973	2:50
5.	"Something There Is About You"	November 6, 1973	4:45
6.	"Forever Young"	November 14, 1973	4:57
Total length:			23:13

Side two
No.	Title	Recorded	Length
1.	"Forever Young"	November 8, 1973	2:49
2.	"Dirge"	November 14, 1973	5:36
3.	"You Angel You"	November 5, 1973	2:54
4.	"Never Say Goodbye"	November 2, 1973	2:56
5.	"Wedding Song"	November 9, 1973	4:42
Total length:			18:57

== Personnel ==
- Bob Dylan – guitar, piano, harmonica, vocals, cover artwork
- Rick Danko – bass guitar
- Levon Helm – drums, mandolin
- Garth Hudson – Lowrey organ, accordion
- Richard Manuel – piano, drums
- Robbie Robertson – guitar
- Ken Lauber – conga (6)

Technical

- Rob Fraboni – production, engineering
- David Gahr, Joel Bernstein – photography
- Nat Jeffery – assistant engineer
- Robbie Robertson – special assistance

== Charts ==
Year	Chart	Peak
1974	Billboard 200	1
1974	Spanish Albums Chart	6

== Certifications ==
Region	Certification	Certified units/sales
United Kingdom (BPI)	Silver	60,000^{^}
United States (RIAA)	Gold	500,000^{^}
^{^} Shipments figures based on certification alone.

== In popular culture ==
This album is referenced in Part 6 of JoJo's Bizarre Adventure, Stone Ocean, with a character possessing a power called "Planet Waves".
