= Wendy Wall =

American singer-songwriter

Wendy Wall is a singer, songwriter and poet based in New York City. She is perhaps best known for her song Postcards To The Stars, which was recorded on SBK Records / Capitol Records. This self-titled debut, Wendy Wall, was produced by Grammy Award-winning producer/engineer, Rob Fraboni.

Wall began recording original material in 1989 and was part of the eclectic female singer-songwriter wave that blossomed in the 1990s. HITS Magazine stated that Wall had "a voice as deep and seductive as the still of midnight".

== Recordings ==
As a folk-rock singer-songwriter, Wall wrote and recorded three studio albums. These projects featured guest musicians/band members such as Steve Holley, Larry Campbell, Joe Lala, Johnny Lee Schell, Baker Lee, Kevin Jenkins, and Marc Shulman. In its first year of release, the debut CD Wendy Wall received 7 New York Music Awards nominations and won the prize for Best Contemporary Folk Album. It climbed to the #1 Album Chart Position at NAC Radio.

The song, The Proving Ground, was used during an episode of the acclaimed television show China Beach and Wall's cover of The Zombies hit Time Of The Season was included on the internationally released soundtrack for China Beach. Videos from the debut CD were in regular rotation on VH1 and Wendy Wall appeared as the musical guest star on Late Night with David Letterman, The Joan Lunden Show, and was the musical guest star on the 1/2 hour music and talk show Nile Rodger's Inner Visions on VH1. The first single, Postcard to the Stars, a commentary on planet Earth and the humans that inhabit it, was featured on VH1's Earth Day Special Event.

The sophomore studio project, Two Birds was recorded and released in 2001 and was produced by Wall and Peter Gallway.

The Road To Paradise (released March 2009) was produced by Wall and Stewart Lerman.

The Simple Truth is recorded but unreleased, according to the singer's web site.

== Discography ==
=== Albums ===
- The Simple Truth (unreleased; track listing unavailable)
- The Road to Paradise
  - "I Woke Up Dreaming"
  - "Back in April"
  - "Hugging the Coast"
  - "Coming to Light"
  - "The Road to Paradise"
  - "Fool's Gold"
  - "What Do I Do with Love"
  - "A Wing and a Prayer"
  - "The Wallflower Waltz"
  - "For All My Worrying"
  - "The Wisdom"
  - "Water Under the Bridge"
  - "Silence of Plenty"
- Two Birds
  - "The Long Goodbye"
  - "Water Water"
  - "The February Thaw"
  - "The Last Days of Winter"
  - "Time to Say Goodbye"
  - "Healings Hands"
  - "Two Birds"
  - "Every Now and Then"
  - "Time Traveler"
  - "Fall from Grace"
  - "By the Light of the Moon"
  - "When a Wild Thing Goes Free"
  - "When My Father Was Tall"
  - "Birdsong"
- Wendy Wall (self-titled)
  - "Dig That Crazy Beat"
  - "Real Love"
  - "Living in a State of Grace"
  - "Wandering the Streets of Modern America"
  - "Sweet Imagination"
  - "Postcard to the Stars"
  - "Missiles & Guns"
  - "Do It"
  - "A Woman's Voice"
  - "The Proving Ground"
  - "Sandcastles"
  - "Time & Change"
  - "Nothing Lasts Forever"
  - "The Thunderhead"

== Sources ==
- Official website
- KRUU FM
- The Valley Advocate, Northampton, MA.
