= Nine Lives (Bonnie Raitt album) =

Studio album by Bonnie Raitt
- Released: 1986
- Genre: Rock
- Length: 41:33
- Label: Warner Bros.
- Producer: Rob Fraboni, Russ Kunkel, Bill Payne, Steve Tyrell, George Massenburg.

Bonnie Raitt chronology
| Green Light (1982) | Nine Lives (1986) | Nick of Time (1989) |

Professional ratings
Review scores
| Source | Rating |
|---|---|
| AllMusic | 3/5 stars |
| Robert Christgau | C+ |
| Entertainment Weekly | D |
| Rolling Stone | (mixed) |

Nine Lives is the ninth album by Bonnie Raitt, released in 1986. It was Raitt's most difficult release, due to the poor sales, negative reviews, and general circumstances surrounding its release.

== History ==
Raitt was one of several artists dropped from Warner Bros. in 1983, along with Arlo Guthrie, Van Morrison, and T Bone Burnett. The company explained that the artists dropped were not making hit singles. Raitt recalled the situation in a 1990 interview in Rolling Stone:

There was a corporate sweep at Warner's, coming from upstairs, and they needed to trim the fat. I just had completed an album called Tongue in Groove, which was produced by Rob Fraboni, who had also done Green Light. And I don't think they maliciously said, 'Let's let her finish her album and get the tour all lined up and print the covers and hire the people to do the video and then drop her.' You know, ha, ha, ha. But that's what they did. It was literally the day after I had finished mastering it. I had already finished the album once, and they said the Jerry Williams tune would be more commercial if it didn't have quite as reggae a beat. Or something like that. So I went in and redid it. I thought if I cooperated a little more, maybe they'd promote the album more. But instead they dropped me and pulled the rug out from under my tour. I thought the way they did it was real crummy. They sent a letter. I think I suffered from not having a relationship with the A&R department there, because I had an independent production deal.

The master tapes could have been purchased by Raitt for release as an album elsewhere, but Warner's asking price was considered too high. "They told me I can take the tapes and shop them around," said Raitt, "but they wanted about $500,000 for them, and nobody wanted to pay that much". The material for Tongue in Groove was shelved until two years later when "Warner's suddenly said they were going to put the record out," Raitt recalled. "I said it wasn't really fair. I think at this point they felt kind of bad. I mean, I was out there touring on my savings to keep my name up, and my ability to draw was less and less. So they agreed to let me go in and recut half of it." The result was Nine Lives, which was finally released in 1986.

The song "Stand Up to the Night" was used in the film Extremities with Farrah Fawcett.

== Track listing ==
Side one
| No. | Title | Lyrics | Length |
|---|---|---|---|
| 1. | "No Way to Treat a Lady" | Bryan Adams, Jim Vallance | 3:51 |
| 2. | "Runnin' Back to Me" | Karla Bonoff, Ira Ingber | 4:14 |
| 3. | "Who But a Fool (Thief Into Paradise)" | Nan O'Byrne, Tom Snow | 4:26 |
| 4. | "Crime of Passion" | Danny Ironstone, Mary Unobsky | 4:20 |
| 5. | "All Day, All Night" | James "Hutch" Hutchinson, Ronald Jones, Ivan Neville | 4:03 |
| Total length: | | | 20:54 |

Side two
| No. | Title | Lyrics | Length |
|---|---|---|---|
| 1. | "Stand Up to the Night" | Will Jennings, Richard Kerr, J.A.C. Redford | 4:43 |
| 2. | "Excited" | Jerry Lynn Williams | 3:12 |
| 3. | "Freezin' (For a Little Human Love)" | Michael Smotherman | 4:58 |
| 4. | "True Love Is Hard to Find" | Frederick Hibbert | 4:34 |
| 5. | "Angel" | Eric Kaz | 4:00 |
| Total length: | | | 21:27 |

== Personnel ==
- Bonnie Raitt – lead vocals, guitars (2), backing vocals (3, 4, 9), slide guitar (3, 10), acoustic guitar (9)
- Bill Payne – acoustic piano (1), keyboards (1, 2, 4)
- Richard "Koz" Kosinski – keyboards (6)
- J.A.C Redford – keyboards (6)
- Guy Moon – additional keyboards (6)
- Ian McLagan – keyboards (7–10)
- Eric Kaz – acoustic piano (10)
- Michael Landau – guitar solo (1, 5), guitars (2, 4)
- Dean Parks – guitars (1, 2, 4, 5)
- Ira Ingber – guitars (2), backing vocals (3)
- Charles Ferrin – guitars (3)
- David Kitay – guitars (6), drum programming (6)
- Johnny Lee Schell – guitars (7–10), backing vocals (9)
- Nathan East – bass (1, 3)
- Neil Stubenhaus – bass (2, 5)
- Leland Sklar – bass (4)
- Ray Ohara – bass (7, 8, 9)
- John Robinson – drums (1, 2)
- Russ Kunkel – drums (3)
- Carlos Vega – drums (4, 5)
- Ian Wallace – drums (7–10)
- Lenny Castro – percussion (3, 5)
- Tower of Power – horns (2, 3)
  - Greg Adams – trumpet, flugelhorn, horn arrangements
  - Emilio Castillo – tenor saxophone
  - Richard Elliot – alto saxophone, tenor saxophone
  - Stephen "Doc" Kupka – baritone saxophone
  - Lee Thornburg – trombone, trumpet, flugelhorn
- Rosemary Butler – backing vocals (1, 3–6)
- Max Carl – backing vocals (1, 3–6)
- Ivan Neville – backing vocals (5)
- Blondie Chaplin – backing vocals (7, 9, 10)
- Stephen Ross – backing vocals (7, 10)
- Sippie Wallace – backing vocals (9)
- Christine McVie – backing vocals (10)
- Todd Sharp – backing vocals (10)

== Production ==
- Producers – George Massenburg and Bill Payne (Tracks 1–5); Russ Kunkel (Track 3); Steve Tyrell (Track 6); Rob Fraboni (Tracks 7–10).
- Engineers – George Massenburg (Tracks 1–5); David Kitay (Track 6); Terry Becker and Rob Fraboni (Tracks 7–10).
- Assistant Engineers – Sharon Rice, John X. Volaitis and Billy Youdelman.
- Mixing – George Massenburg (Tracks 1–5); David Tickle (Tracks 7–10).
- Mastered by Doug Sax at The Mastering Lab (Los Angeles, CA).
- Project Coordinator – Jo Motta
- Production Coordination – Ivy Skoff
- Art Direction and Design – Laura LiPuma
- Cover Illustration – Lindsey Loch
- Photography – Jim Shea
- Wardrobe – Margie Kent
- Make-up – Denise Pauly
- Management – Danny Goldberg and Ron Stone

== Charts ==
Billboard (United States)

| Year | Chart | Position |
|---|---|---|
| 1986 | The Billboard 200 | 138 |
