= Home Plate (album) =

Studio album by Bonnie Raitt
- Released: 1975
- Studio: Elektra, Los Angeles, California
- Genre: Rock
- Length: 31:59
- Label: Warner Bros.
- Producer: Paul Rothchild

Bonnie Raitt chronology
Streetlights (1974)	Home Plate (1975)	Sweet Forgiveness (1977)

Professional ratings
Review scores
Source	Rating
AllMusic	3/5 stars
Christgau's Record Guide	A
Entertainment Weekly	A
Rolling Stone	(average)

Home Plate is the fifth album by Bonnie Raitt, released in 1975.

== Track listing ==
Side one
No.	Title	Writer(s)	Length
1.	"What Do You Want the Boy to Do?"	Allen Toussaint	3:19
2.	"Good Enough"	John Hall, Johanna Hall	2:56
3.	"Run Like a Thief"	JD Souther	3:02
4.	"Fool Yourself"	Fred Tackett	3:04
5.	"My First Night Alone Without You"	Kin Vassy	3:07

Side two
No.	Title	Writer(s)	Length
1.	"Walk Out the Front Door"	Mark T. Jordan, Rip Stock	3:09
2.	"Sugar Mama"	Glen Clark (lyrics adapted by Raitt)	3:45
3.	"Pleasin' Each Other"	Bill Payne, Fran Tate	3:44
4.	"I'm Blowin' Away"	Eric Kaz	3:25
5.	"Your Sweet and Shiny Eyes"	Nan O'Byrne	2:47
Total length:			31:59

== Personnel ==
- Bonnie Raitt – guitar, electric guitar, vocals (all), slide guitar, electric slide guitar (9)
- Harry Bluestone – concert master
- George Bohanon – trombone, baritone saxophone, bass trumpet
- Jackson Browne – vocals, background vocals
- Rosemary Butler – vocals, background vocals
- Venetta Fields – vocals, background vocals
- Freebo – bass, guitar, tuba, vocals, guitarron, fretless bass
- Jim Gordon – baritone saxophone
- Debbie Greene – vocals, background vocals
- John Hall – guitar, electric guitar
- Emmylou Harris – vocals, background vocals
- John Herald – vocals, background vocals
- Dick Hyde – trombone, trumpet, bass trumpet; horn (as Richard Hyde)
- Jerry Jumonville – tenor saxophone
- Jef Labes – keyboard
- Maxayn Lewis – vocals, background vocals
- Gary Mallaber – drums
- Will McFarlane – guitar, electric guitar
- Robbie Montgomery – vocals, background vocals
- Bill Payne – accordion, keyboard, vocals
- Jeff Porcaro – percussion
- Greg Prestopino – vocals, background vocals
- Terry Reid – vocals, background vocals
- John Sebastian – autoharp, harp
- William D. "Smitty" Smith – piano, keyboard
- JD Souther – vocals, background vocals
- Fred Tackett – synthesizer, acoustic guitar, guitar, mandolin, keyboard, 12 string guitar, Fender Rhodes
- Willow VanDer Hoek – vocals, background vocals
- Tom Waits – vocals, background vocals on "Your Sweet and Shiny Eyes"
- Dennis Whitted – drums
- Jai Winding – piano, keyboard, clavinet

Production

- Producer: Paul Rothchild
- Engineer: Fritz Richmond
- Remastering supervisor: Ed Cherney
- Remastering: Gregg Geller
- Project coordinator: Jo Motta
- Horn arrangements: Nick DeCaro, Jerry Jumonville, Bill Payne, Fred Tackett
- String arrangements: Nick DeCaro
- Art direction: Lockart
- Photography: Michael Dobo, Norman Seeff
- Cover photo: Norman Seeff

== Charts ==
Chart (1975)	Peak position
US Top LPs & Tape (Billboard)	43
