= Streetlights (Bonnie Raitt album) =

Studio album by Bonnie Raitt
- Released: September 1974
- Recorded: Mid-1974
- Studios: The Hit Factory, New York City
- Genres: Pop; R&B
- Length: 37:05
- Label: Warner Bros.
- Producer: Jerry Ragovoy

Bonnie Raitt chronology
Takin' My Time (1973)	Streetlights (1974)	Home Plate (1975)

Streetlights is the fourth album by Bonnie Raitt, released in 1974.

== Recording and music ==
Bonnie Raitt was allotted $10,000 by Warner Bros. Records to record Streetlights, which was the least amount of money she had received to record an album. Warner Bros. was unhappy with the lengthy production surrounding her previous album, Takin' My Time, and the company limited her expenses. The two parties eventually agreed on an advance of more money, on the condition Raitt would choose a producer with a history of commercial success. Raitt chose Jerry Ragovoy, who had worked with musicians such as Janis Joplin and Dionne Warwick. Ragovoy felt Raitt's music was bogged down by blues music, and wanted to produce an album with a more slick and polished pop sound. Raitt did not like Ragovoy's decision, but acquiesced, and Streetlights was recorded during mid-1974.

Critics have described Streetlights as Raitt's first attempt to record music for a mainstream audience. In contrast to the eclectic and laid-back sound of her first three albums, Streetlights features simpler arrangements with more string instrumentation, influenced by pop and R&B music. It is Raitt's only album in which she does not play the slide guitar. Session musician Freebo said Raitt was negatively affected by the more professional production of Streetlights. "The environment changed her singing. She was in a professional world with Streetlights, and had to act like one" said Freebo. Nine of the ten tracks on the album are covers of songs by musicians such as Joni Mitchell, James Taylor, and John Prine. The one original track, "Ain't Nobody Home", was written by Ragovoy.

== Release and reception ==
Retrospective professional reviews
Review scores
Source	Rating
AllMusic	4/5 stars
Christgau's Record Guide	B
Entertainment Weekly	B
MusicHound Rock	2/5 stars
The New Rolling Stone Record Guide	2/5 stars

Streetlights was released in September 1974, by Warner Bros. Streetlights reached number eighty on the Billboard Top LPs & Tape chart and number 129 on the Cashbox Top 100 Albums chart. To support the album, Raitt went on a North American tour with Jackson Browne, from September 13 to November 24. On two stops in Boston and Washington, D.C., Raitt was accompanied by blues musicians Roosevelt Sykes and Sippie Wallace.

== Track listing ==
Side one

1. "That Song About the Midway" (Joni Mitchell) – 4:44
2. "Rainy Day Man" (James Taylor, Zach Wiesner) – 3:41
3. "Angel from Montgomery" (John Prine) – 3:59
4. "I Got Plenty" (Joey Levine, Jim Carroll) – 3:09
5. "Streetlights" (Bill Payne) – 5:05

Side two

1. "What Is Success" (Allen Toussaint) – 3:32
2. "Ain't Nobody Home" (Jerry Ragovoy) – 3:04
3. "Everything That Touches You" (Michael Kamen) – 3:28
4. "Got You on My Mind" (David Lasley, Allee Willis) – 3:50
5. "You Got to Be Ready for Love (If You Wanna Be Mine)" (Lou Courtney) – 3:08

== Personnel ==
Credits adapted from Bonnie Raitt's official website.

- Bonnie Raitt – lead vocals, guitar (1, 2, 3), backing vocals (7)
- Don Grolnick – keyboards (1, 2)
- Leon Pendarvis – keyboards (3–6, 9, 10), arrangements (10)
- Paul Griffin – keyboards (7), acoustic piano (8)
- Jon Mayer – keyboards (9, 10)
- David Spinozza – guitar (1, 2, 4, 6)
- Charlie Brown – guitar (3)
- Jeff Mironov – guitar (3, 7, 8)
- Jerry Friedman – guitar (4, 5, 6)
- John Tropea – guitar (5, 7, 8)
- John Hall – guitar (9, 10)
- Bob Mann – guitar (9, 10)
- Freebo – bass guitar (1, 2)
- Bob Babbitt – bass guitar (3–8)
- Richard Davis – bass guitar (9, 10)
- Steve Gadd – drums
- Arthur Jenkins – percussion (1–4, 6, 10)
- Ralph MacDonald – percussion (6, 9)
- Jerry Ragovoy – arrangements (1–9)
- Larry Wilcox – horn and string arrangements (1, 2, 5, 8)
- Dave Matthews – horn arrangements (4, 6, 7), string arrangements (6)
- Lou Courtney – backing vocals (3, 7)
- David Lasley – backing vocals (3, 9, 10)
- Carl Hall – backing vocals (4, 6)
- Sharon Redd – backing vocals (4, 6, 9, 10)
- Tasha Thomas – backing vocals (4, 6)
- Natalie Venable – backing vocals (9, 10)

=== Production ===
- Jerry Ragovoy – producer
- Blaise Castellano – assistant engineer
- Harry Maslin – engineer, remixing
- Bruce Tergesen – engineer
- Lee Herschberg – remastering
- Gregg Geller – series producer
- Jo Motta – project coordinator

== Charts ==
Chart (1974)	Peak position
US Billboard 200	80
US Cashbox 100	129
