= Sweet Forgiveness =

Studio album by Bonnie Raitt
- Released: April 1977
- Studios: Sunset Sound, Los Angeles
- Genre: Rock
- Length: 37:37
- Label: Warner Bros.
- Producer: Paul Rothchild

Bonnie Raitt chronology
Home Plate (1975)	Sweet Forgiveness (1977)	The Glow (1979)

Sweet Forgiveness is the sixth album by Bonnie Raitt, released in 1977. The single "Two Lives" was written by Mark T. Jordan of the Edison Electric Band.

Raitt's cover of the Del Shannon hit "Runaway" was issued as a single, reaching No. 57 on the U.S. singles chart.

== Critical reception ==
Professional ratings
Review scores
Source	Rating
AllMusic	2/5 stars
Christgau's Record Guide	A−
Entertainment Weekly	A

Rolling Stone wrote that Raitt has "abandoned her flowing naturalness for a plodding roughness which, unfortunately, matches producer Paul Rothchild’s singular lack of imagination."

== Track listing ==
Side one

1. "About to Make Me Leave Home" (Earl Randall) – 4:14
2. "Runaway" (Max Crook, Del Shannon) – 3:57
3. "Two Lives" (Mark T. Jordan) – 3:49
4. "Louise" (Paul Siebel) – 2:45
5. "Gamblin' Man" (Eric Kaz) – 3:27

Side two

1. "Sweet Forgiveness" (Daniel Moore) – 4:11
2. "My Opening Farewell" (Jackson Browne) – 5:20
3. "Three Time Loser" (Don Covay, Ron Miller) – 3:19
4. "Takin' My Time" (Bill Payne) – 3:37
5. "Home" (Karla Bonoff) – 3:28

== Personnel ==
- Bonnie Raitt – acoustic guitar, guitar, electric guitar, vocals, slide guitar
- Norton Buffalo – harmonica
- Rosemary Butler – vocals
- Lester Chambers – vocals
- Sam Clayton – conductor, conga
- Freebo – bass, guitar, vocals, fretless bass
- David Grisman – mandolin, mandocello
- Jef Labes – keyboard
- Maxayn Lewis – vocals
- Michael McDonald – vocals
- Will McFarlane – guitar, electric guitar, slide guitar
- Bill Payne – organ, synthesizer, piano, keyboard, vocals, Fender Rhodes
- JD Souther – vocals
- Fred Tackett – acoustic guitar, guitar, keyboard
- Dennis Whitted – drums
- Carlena Williams – vocals

Production

- Producer: Paul A. Rothchild
- Engineers: John Haeny, Roger Mayer
- Remastering: Keith Blake, Lee Herschberg
- Series producer: Gregg Geller
- Project coordinator: Jo Motta
- Art direction: John Van Hamersveld
- Photography: John Van Hamersveld

== Charts and certifications ==
Chart (1977)	Peak position
US Billboard 200	25

Region	Certification	Certified units/sales
United States (RIAA)	Gold	500,000^{^}
^{^} Shipments figures based on certification alone.
