= Takin' My Time =

Studio album by Bonnie Raitt
- Released: October 1973
- Recorded: June–July 1973
- Studio: Sunset Sound, Los Angeles
- Genre: Blues; folk; jazz; New Orleans rhythm and blues; calypso
- Length: 37:37
- Label: Warner Bros.
- Producer: John Hall

Bonnie Raitt chronology
Give It Up (1972)	Takin' My Time (1973)	Streetlights (1974)

Takin' My Time is the third studio album by American musician Bonnie Raitt. It was released in 1973 by Warner Bros. Records. The album is an amalgamation of several different genres, including blues, folk, jazz, New Orleans rhythm and blues, and calypso. The 10 tracks on the album are covers, ranging from soft sentimental ballads to upbeat, rhythmic-heavy tracks. Lowell George was originally hired to handle the production, but was ultimately replaced by John Hall when Raitt became unhappy with his production.

Takin' My Time received positive reviews from music critics, and reached number 87 on the US Billboard Top LPs & Tape chart. Retrospective reviews have also been positive, with critics praising the eclecticism, as well as Raitt's attempts to broaden her musical horizon. Raitt went on an accompanying tour of the United States.

== Background and composition ==
In 1973, Raitt moved to Los Angeles, and became friends with members of American rock band Little Feat. After the release of their album Dixie Chicken (1973), Raitt hired frontman and guitarist Lowell George to produce her upcoming album. Raitt was unhappy with George's production, which she said was due to a lack of objectivity. According to Raitt: "It became too emotional. It's hard having a strong woman telling the man her ideas when, in fact, the man wants to take over the situation." American musician John Hall was then brought in for production to replace George. Under the direction of Hall, Takin' My Time was recorded from June to July 1973 at Sunset Sound Recorders in Los Angeles.

Takin' My Time combines many different music genres, including blues, folk, jazz, New Orleans rhythm and blues, and calypso. Takin' My Time is similar to Raitt's previous studio album Give It Up (1972), as both albums feature a mix of soft sentimental ballads and upbeat, rhythmic-heavy tracks. The sentimental ballads focus on romance and heartache, and possess a "late night, bluesy intimacy," according to No Depression. The upbeat tracks vary in genre; "Wah She Go Do" is a calypso and reggae-inspired track, while "Let Me In" is a dance track, inspired by polka and ragtime. All 10 tracks on the album are covers of songs from musicians like Jackson Browne, Randy Newman and Calypso Rose.

== Release and reception ==
Retrospective professional reviews
Review scores
Source	Rating
AllMusic	4/5 stars
Christgau's Record Guide	A−
Entertainment Weekly	B+
MusicHound Rock	3.5/5 stars
The New Rolling Stone Record Guide	4/5 stars

Takin' My Time was released in October 1973, through Warner Bros. Records. It reached number 87 on the Billboard Top LPs & Tape chart, and number 91 on the Record World album chart. Raitt supported the album with an incessant touring schedule across the United States; biographer Mark Bego described Raitt's approach to touring as a "perform-pack-unpack-perform lifestyle."

Takin' My Time was met with positive reviews from music critics. The staff of Billboard described the album as "a top mix of blues and ballads such as 'I Gave My Love a Candle' from one of po[p]'s most underrated female vocalists." A critic for Record World highlighted Hall's production, and wrote: "Bonnie's beautiful voice and super blues guitar playing grace a collection of wonderful songs." Tony Glover of Rolling Stone felt that despite the large amount of musical variety, Takin' My Time was Raitt's most cohesive album. Glover commended the musicianship between Raitt and the backup musicians, with him writing that "it's evident a lot of her soul went into this one, and that makes it worth hearing."

Retrospective reviews of Takin' My Time from critics have also been positive. In his book Christgau's Record Guide: Rock Albums of the Seventies, Robert Christgau commended Raitt's attempt to broaden her musical scope with more eclectic tracks such as "You've Been in Love Too Long" and "Wah She Go Do". Christgau wrote more negatively towards some of the folk-inspired tracks, which he called "too pretty, too ordinary." Robert Gordon of Entertainment Weekly praised the wide musical variety on Takin' My Time, with him saying: "Raitt sounds comfortable singing rhythmic rockers, slow songs, and a swinging New Orleans tune, 'Let Me In.' The lighthearted calypso 'Wah She Go Do' may be just a lark, but it's definitely fun." Vik Iyengar of AllMusic felt Raitt had done a good job at choosing and interpreting the 10 cover tracks, and called Takin' My Time an "underrated gem." Iyengar believed Takin' My Time was Raitt's last consistent album until her comeback in the 1980s.

== Track listing ==
Credits adapted from Bonnie Raitt's official website.

Side one
No.	Title	Writer(s)	Length
1.	"You've Been in Love Too Long"	Ivy Jo Hunter; Clarence Paul; William Stevenson	3:43
2.	"I Gave My Love a Candle"	Joel Zoss	4:20
3.	"Let Me In"	Yvonne Baker	3:38
4.	"Everybody's Cryin' Mercy"	Mose Allison	3:29
5.	"Cry Like a Rainstorm"	Eric Kaz	3:55

Side two
No.	Title	Writer(s)	Length
1.	"Wah She Go Do"	Calypso Rose	3:12
2.	"I Feel the Same"	Chris Smither	4:40
3.	"I Thought I Was a Child"	Jackson Browne	3:49
4.	"Write Me a Few of Your Lines/Kokomo Blues"	Mississippi Fred McDowell	3:36
5.	"Guilty"	Randy Newman	2:58
Total length:			37:37

== Personnel ==
Credits adapted from Bonnie Raitt's official website.

- Bonnie Raitt – acoustic guitar, electric guitar, vocals, background vocals, handclapping, bottleneck guitar
- Paul Barrere – electric guitar
- George Bohanon – trombone
- Sam Clayton – congas
- Carol Farhat – handclapping
- Glenn Ferris – horn
- Freebo – fretless bass, tuba, background vocals
- Lowell George – slide guitar
- John Hall – electric guitar, background vocals, handclapping, mellotron
- Bob Hardaway – horn
- Robert Hardaway – saxophone
- Milt Holland – tabla, tambourine, timbales, claves, shaker
- Carl Huston – handclapping
- Kirby Johnson – conductor
- Earl Palmer, Jim Keltner – drums
- Marty Krystall – saxophone
- Taj Mahal – harmonica, vocals, background vocals, acoustic bass
- Van Dyke Parks – piano, keyboard, vocals, background vocals
- Bill Payne – organ, piano, electric piano, vocals, background vocals
- Joel Peskin – saxophone
- Nat Seligman – handclapping
- Tony Terran – trumpet
- Oscar Brashear – trumpet
- Bud Brisbois – trumpet
- Ernie Watts – soprano saxophone

Production

- John Hall – producer
- John Haeny – engineer
- Richard Heenan – mixing
- Arnie Acosta – mastering
- Doug Sax – mastering
- Ed Cherney – remastering supervisor
- Lee Herschberg – remastering
- Jo Motta – project coordinator
- H George Bohanon – horn arrangements
- Kirby Johnson – horn arrangements
- Tom Gamache – art direction, design
- Sandy Kroopf – art direction, design, photography, back cover
- Michael Dobo – photography, cover photo

== Charts ==
Chart performance for Takin' My Time
Chart (1973)	Peak position
US Billboard Top LPs & Tape	87
US Record World 100	91
