= Nick of Time (song) =

Single by Bonnie Raitt

from the album Nick of Time
- B-side: "The Road's My Middle Name"
- Released: May 19, 1990
- Genre: Heartland rock
- Length: 3:52
- Label: Capitol
- Songwriter: Bonnie Raitt
- Producer: Don Was

Bonnie Raitt singles chronology
"Have a Heart" (1990)	"Nick of Time" (1990)	"Love Letter" (1990)

"Nick of Time" is a song by American blues musician Bonnie Raitt. Taken as the third single from her 10th solo album of the same name (1989), the song was released in May 1990. The song debuted at number 94 and reached its peak of 92 a week later on the Hot 100 chart. It also earned a top 10 placement on the Adult Contemporary Chart.

== Background ==
A heartland rock song, Raitt wrote most of the song during a week-long cabin retreat in Mendocino, California, and she recorded a homemade demo on her own.

The song was inspired by a culmination of observations about aging. The first verse ("A friend of mine, she cries at night...") was taken from a conversation Raitt had with a heartbroken friend who was nearing middle age and desperately wanting a baby, and the song also featured her singing about her own parents (“I see my folks, they’re getting old…”).

== Personnel ==
- Bonnie Raitt – lead vocals, electric piano
- Michael Landau – guitar
- Hutch Hutchinson – bass
- Ricky Fataar – drums, percussion
- Paulinho da Costa – congas
- Sir Harry Bowens – backing vocals
- Arnold McCuller – backing vocals

== Chart performance ==
Chart (1990)	Position
Australia (ARIA)	16
Germany (GfK)	73
Netherlands (Single Top 100)	67
UK Singles (Official Charts)	82
US Billboard Hot 100	92
US Adult Contemporary (Billboard)	10
US Cashbox Top 100	70

== Nominations and awards ==
Raitt won the Best Female Pop Vocal Performance at the 32nd Annual Grammy Awards for her recording of this song. Bonnie Raitt received three more wins at the ceremony, including Album of the Year. In 2015 the song was inducted into the Grammy Hall of Fame.

== Other versions ==
Bon Iver covered the song in June 2011. A version of the cover is available on YouTube. His version was sampled on remixed version of Charli xcx's song "I think about it all the time" from her 2024 remix album Brat and It's Completely Different but Also Still Brat.

The song was also covered by Lake Street Dive on Fun Machine: The Sequel.
