= Green Light (Bonnie Raitt album) =

Studio album by Bonnie Raitt
- Released: 1982
- Studio: Shangri-La, Malibu, California
- Genre: Heartland rock
- Length: 35:05
- Label: Warner Bros.
- Producer: Rob Fraboni

Bonnie Raitt chronology
The Glow (1979)	Green Light (1982)	Nine Lives (1986)

Professional ratings
Review scores
Source	Rating
AllMusic	4.5/5 stars
Robert Christgau	A−
Entertainment Weekly	B−
Rolling Stone	3/5 stars

Green Light is the eighth album by Bonnie Raitt, released in 1982.

"What I wanted this time out was a combination of the music I've been listening to recently," Raitt said in 1982, "Billy Burnette, the Blasters, Rockpile, and the rock-a-billy New Wave scene. I knew I had to get away from the slick sound I had with the Peter Asher record...I was a little stung by the lack of response to The Glow. And I was disappointed by not being able to make a record that sounded the way I wanted it to sound. Moving to Shangri-la, I wanted to get back to the roots and to the funkiness I had on earlier records, even though I'm not crazy about how they sound. They sound like I was having a lot more fun than I really was. Green Light is the first album I actually had fun doing."

Green Light earned Raitt her strongest reviews in years, with critic Robert Christgau writing that "on The Glow the present-day female interpreter refused to die, and now she does even better by the suspect notion of good ol' you-know-what. The strength of [Green Light] runs too deep to rise up and grab you all at once, so you might begin with "Me and the Boys", arch as usual from NRBQ but formally advanced pull-out-the-stops (with all postfeminist peculiarities accounted for) when Bonnie and the boys get down on it."

According to Raitt, the album's hard-rock approach came as a surprise to some of her peers. "Well, a lot of my friends thought I had moved to the beach and turned into Gidget. But it's not like I suddenly became an airhead. I needed to lighten up a bit, that's all. I was laughing all the time, having a lot of fun, hanging out at this funky old studio that had hippie blankets hanging from the ceiling. Now I'm getting some feedback from people who feel the same way that I do about rock and roll. Then there are other, more conservative friends whom I've known for years who still wish I was sitting in a chair playing acoustic guitar."

== Track listing ==
Side one

1. "Keep This Heart in Mind" (Fred Marrone, Steve Holsapple)– 3:20
2. "River of Tears" (Eric Kaz) – 4:54
3. "Can't Get Enough" (Bonnie Raitt, Walt Richmond) – 2:51
4. "Willya Wontcha" (Johnny Lee Schell) – 3:22
5. "Let's Keep It Between Us" (Bob Dylan) – 4:43

Side two

1. "Me and the Boys" (Terry Adams) – 3:38
2. "I Can't Help Myself" (Raitt, Schell, Ricky Fataar, Ray Ohara) – 3:06
3. "Baby Come Back" (Eddy Grant) – 2:48
4. "Talk to Me" (Jerry Lynn Williams) – 3:22
5. "Green Lights" (Adams, Joey Spampinato) – 3:14

== Personnel ==
- Bonnie Raitt – lead vocals, guitar, slide guitar, backing vocals (6, 7, 8)

The Bump Band

- Ian "Mac" McLagan – keyboards
- Johnny Lee Schell – guitar, backing vocals (1, 6, 7, 8), organ (2), autoharp (8), percussion (9)
- Ray Ohara – bass
- Ricky Fataar – drums, percussion, backing vocals (1)

with:

- Jackson Browne – backing vocals (1)
- Melanie Rosales – backing vocals (1)
- Richard Manuel – harmony vocals (2)
- Vince Gill – backing vocals (7)
- Steve Raitt – backing vocals (8)
- William D. "Smitty" Smith – organ (5)
- Rick Vito – additional guitar (1, 8, 9, 10)
- Mac James – additional guitar (8)
- Rob Fraboni – percussion (3)
- David Woodford – saxophone (1, 3, 9)

== Production ==
- Producer – Rob Fraboni
- Engineer – Tim Kramer
- Additional Engineer – Terry Becker
- Assistant Engineer – Thom Yuill
- Originally mastered by Mike Reese at The Mastering Lab (Los Angeles, CA).
- Remastering Supervisor – Ed Cherney
- Remastering – Keith Blake and Gregg Geller
- Project Coordinator – Jo Motta
- Art Direction – Tim Ritchie
- Design – Mac James
- Photography – John Livzey
- Management – Jeffrey Hersh and Dick Waterman

== Charts ==
Billboard (United States)

Year	Chart	Position
1982	Pop Albums	38
