= The Glow (Bonnie Raitt album) =

Studio album by Bonnie Raitt
- Released: September 1979
- Studio: Sound Factory (Hollywood)
- Genre: Rock
- Length: 36:59
- Label: Warner Bros.
- Producer: Peter Asher

Bonnie Raitt chronology
| Sweet Forgiveness (1977) | The Glow (1979) | Green Light (1982) |

The Glow is the seventh album by the American musician Bonnie Raitt, released in 1979. It was one of the first albums to be recorded and mixed digitally.

== Critical reception ==
Professional ratings
Review scores
| Source | Rating |
|---|---|
| AllMusic | 3.5/5 stars |
| Christgau's Record Guide | B+ |
| The Encyclopedia of Popular Music | 2/5 stars |
| Entertainment Weekly | B− |
| MusicHound Rock: The Essential Album Guide | 2/5 stars |
| The Rolling Stone Album Guide | 3/5 stars |

Rolling Stone wrote that Asher "doesn’t overproduce in the usual sense by filling tracks with unnecessary sweetening, but rather by turning out gleamingly spare, 'official' Los Angeles rock that’s as spiritually hollow as it is technically immaculate." The Globe and Mail noted that, "as always, she could use a little shake-up in her sound and in the now typecast way she approaches each song." The New York Times concluded that the album "includes the finest vocal performances of her career."

== Track listing ==
Side one

1. "I Thank You" (Isaac Hayes, David Porter) – 2:51
2. "Your Good Thing (Is About to End)" (Isaac Hayes, David Porter) – 4:00
3. "Standin' by the Same Old Love" (Raitt) – 4:10
4. "Sleep's Dark and Silent Gate" (Jackson Browne) – 3:25
5. "The Glow" (Veyler Hildebrand) – 4:11

Side two

1. "Bye Bye Baby" (Mary Wells) – 3:17
2. "The Boy Can't Help It" (Bobby Troup) – 3:39
3. "(I Could Have Been Your) Best Old Friend" (Andy McMahon, Tracy Nelson) – 2:52
4. "You're Gonna Get What's Coming" (Robert Palmer) – 3:32
5. "(Goin') Wild for You Baby" (David Batteau, Tom Snow) – 5:25

== Personnel ==
  - As listed in liner notes:
- Bonnie Raitt – lead vocals, electric slide guitar (3, 8), National steel guitar (7)
- Danny Kortchmar – electric guitar (1–4, 6, 7, 9), backing vocals (7)
- Waddy Wachtel – electric guitar (1, 3, 4, 6–10), harmony vocals (3), backing vocals (7)
- Bill Payne – acoustic piano (1–4), electric piano (8, 10), Oberheim synthesizer (9, 10)
- Don Grolnick – acoustic piano (5)
- Bob Glaub – bass guitar (1–4, 6, 7, 9, 10)
- Bob Magnusson – bass guitar (5)
- Freebo – bass guitar (8)
- Rick Marotta – drums (1–4, 6–10), cowbell (1), percussion (6, 7, 8)
- John Guerin – drums (5)
- Larry Williams – saxophone (2)
- Trevor Lawrence – saxophone (2)
- David Sanborn – alto saxophone solo (2)
- Steve Madaio – trumpet (2)
- Paul Butterfield – harmonica (6)
- Rosemary Butler – backing vocals (1, 9)
- Kenny Edwards – backing vocals (1, 4, 9)
- Maxayn Lewis – backing vocals (1, 9)
- JD Souther – backing vocals (1, 9)
- Craig Fuller – backing vocals (4)
- Peter Asher – backing vocals (7)

Production

- Producer – Peter Asher
- Recorded and mixed by Val Garay
- Assistant engineers – Niko Bolas and George Ybarra
- Recorded and mixed at The Sound Factory (Hollywood, CA)
- Mastered by Doug Sax at The Mastering Lab (Los Angeles)
- Art direction and design – John Kosh
- Cover photo – David Alexander
- Sleeve photos – Jim Shea

== Charts ==
Billboard (United States)

| Year | Chart | Position |
|---|---|---|
| 1979 | Pop Albums | 30 |
