= Give It Up (Bonnie Raitt album) =

Studio album by Bonnie Raitt
- Released: September 1972
- Recorded: June 1972
- Studios: Bearsville, Woodstock, New York
- Genres: Folk; blues; R&B; soft rock; folk rock
- Length: 36:04
- Label: Warner Bros.
- Producer: Michael Cuscuna

Bonnie Raitt chronology
Bonnie Raitt (1971)	Give It Up (1972)	Takin' My Time (1973)

Singles from Give It Up
- 1. "Too Long at the Fair" Released: December 1972

Give It Up is the second studio album by American musician Bonnie Raitt. Released in 1972 by Warner Bros. Records, Give It Up is an amalgamation of various genres, including folk, blues, R&B, and soft rock. Seven of the ten tracks on the album are covers, and the tracks range from soft sentimental ballads to fast-paced folk rock pieces. Lyrically, Give It Up revolves around Raitt's femininity, relationships, and being comfortable with herself. Raitt recorded the album at Bearsville Studios with producer Michael Cuscuna.

Give It Up was Raitt's first album to reach the Billboard Top LPs & Tape chart, where it peaked at number 138. The initial reception was positive, as critics liked the vocals and the musicianship throughout the album. Contemporary reviews are also positive, with some critics calling Give It Up a stand-out album within Raitt's discography. In 2012, Rolling Stone ranked Give It Up at number 495 on its list of the 500 Greatest Albums of All Time.

== Composition ==
Give It Up was recorded in June 1972 at Bearsville Studios in New York, with producer Michael Cuscuna. It is an amalgamation of several music genres, including folk, blues, R&B, and soft rock. The ten tracks on the album are a mix of soft sentimental ballads and fast-paced folk rock pieces. Some of the faster tracks are accompanied by brass instrumentation, which is played in the style of a New Orleans brass band. This sound is demonstrated on the opening track "Give It Up or Let Me Go". It begins with an acoustic guitar, but then transitions into an explosive sound of a brass band, reminiscent of Dixieland music. Give It Up features many guest musicians, most of which were from the area around Woodstock, New York. Among these are future politician John Hall, multi-instrumentalist Freebo, and blues singer Paul Butterfield. Overall, Give It Up has a smoother, more polished sound than its predecessor Bonnie Raitt.

Raitt wrote three songs for the album. The other seven songs are covers of songs by musicians like Chris Smither, Jackson Browne, and Joel Zoss. Lyrically, Give It Up revolves around Raitt's femininity, relationships, and being comfortable with herself. According to biographer Mark Bego, Raitt sounds more confident while singing on this album when compared to her vocal performance on Bonnie Raitt. Stephen Thomas Erlewine of AllMusic wrote: "Raitt can be earthy and sexy, but she balances it with an inviting sensuality that makes the record glow". Raitt herself would later criticize the vocals, stating: "I sound like Mickey Mouse!"

== Release and reception ==
Retrospective professional reviews
Review scores
Source	Rating
AllMusic	4.5/5 stars
Christgau's Record Guide	A
Entertainment Weekly	B+
MusicHound Rock	3.5/5 stars
The New Rolling Stone Record Guide	4/5 stars

Give It Up was released in September 1972 by Warner Bros. Records. It sold moderately well, and was Raitt's first album to reach the Billboard Top LPs & Tape chart, where it peaked at number 138. It was certified gold by the Recording Industry Association of America in 1985, denoting shipments of 500,000 copies. The song "Too Long at the Fair" was released as a promotional single to radio stations, although it did not reach any music charts.

Give It Up received positive reviews upon release. A critic for Billboard wrote: "Bonnie Raitt is presented in her second album for the label and it should be a big one. Her unique vocal treatments and guitar style on 'Stayed [sic] Too Long at the Fair' and the title song should do a lot to sell the album." Record World described Give It Up as "an exceptional effort. The choice of material, from the self-penned numbers to a stunning Jackson Browne tune, is excellent and the musicianship and production could hardly be better." Rolling Stone critic Jon Landau also praised the album, writing that "the best thing about Bonnie Raitt is her singing, and the best thing about Give It Up is that she sings great from beginning to end; in doing so, she successfully handles a far greater range of styles and material than on her first album and has produced a more interesting and satisfying record in the process." Landau highlighted the three original songs, and called "Love Has No Pride" the perfect summation of Raitt's musical abilities.

Retrospective appraisals have also been positive. In The New Rolling Stone Record Guide, critic Bart Testa wrote: "Give It Up [comes] closest to perfecting her approach: she [mingles] her blues resources with a variety of contemporary and folk-oriented songs, coming up with classics in 'Been Too Long at the Fair' and Eric Kaz & Libby Titus' Love Has No Pride. Stephen Thomas Erlewine of AllMusic noted how singers like Sheryl Crow and Shelby Lynne were likely inspired by Give It Up, and ultimately described it as "one of the great Southern California records." In a review published for Christgau's Record Guide: Rock Albums of the Seventies (1981), Robert Christgau commended Raitt's maturity and intelligence in both her style of play as well as her lyrics. Christgau later ranked Give It Up at number 31 on his decade-end list of the best albums of the 1970s.

In 2012, Rolling Stone ranked Give It Up at number 495 on its list of the 500 Greatest Albums of All Time, calling it "gorgeous folksy blues".

== Track listing ==
Side one
No.	Title	Writer(s)	Length
1.	"Give It Up or Let Me Go"	Bonnie Raitt	4:28
2.	"Nothing Seems to Matter"	Raitt	4:04
3.	"I Know"	Barbara George	3:40
4.	"If You Gotta Make a Fool of Somebody"	Rudy Clark	2:54
5.	"Love Me Like a Man"	Chris Smither (lyrics adapted by Raitt)	3:10

Side two
No.	Title	Writer(s)	Length
1.	"Too Long at the Fair"	Joel Zoss	2:54
2.	"Under the Falling Sky"	Jackson Browne	3:38
3.	"You Got to Know How"	Sippie Wallace; Jack Viertel	3:32
4.	"You Told Me Baby"	Raitt	4:01
5.	"Love Has No Pride"	Eric Kaz; Libby Titus	3:43
Total length:			36:04

== Personnel ==
Credits adapted from the liner notes of the 1972 release. Each number denotes which track features the musician and instrument.

=== Musicians ===
- Bonnie Raitt – lead vocals, steel guitar (1, 3), acoustic guitar (2, 4–8, 10), backing vocals (3, 7), 12-string guitar (6), electric rhythm guitar (9), acoustic piano (10)
- Jack Viertel – steel guitar (1)
- T.J. Tindall – electric guitar (3, 7)
- Kal David – electric guitar (4)
- Lou Terriciano – acoustic piano (1, 8)
- Mark T. Jordan – acoustic piano (3), vibraphone (3), electric piano (7)
- Merl Saunders – acoustic piano (4)
- Dave Holland – acoustic bass (1, 2, 8)
- Chris Parker – drums (1, 4, 8)
- Wells Kelly – congas (2, 3, 9), drums (3, 6, 7, 9), cowbell (3, 7), backing vocals (3)
- Dennis Whitted – drums (5)
- Eric Kaz – vibraphone (2), acoustic piano (6), horn arrangement (9)
- Peter Ecklund – cornet (1, 3)
- Amos Garrett – trombone (1)
- Freebo – tuba (1), 12-string rhythm guitar (2), fretless bass (3–7, 9, 10), backing vocals (3)
- John Payne – tenor saxophone (2), clarinet (8), soprano saxophone (9), sax solo (9)
- Marty Grebb – tenor saxophone (4), alto saxophone (9)
- Terry Eaton – tenor saxophone (9)
- Gene Boris Stashuk – cello (6)
- Paul Butterfield – harmonica (7)
- John Hall – backing vocals (3), electric guitar (6, 9), "steel drum" guitar (9)
- Jackie Lomax – backing vocals (3)
- Tim Moore – backing vocals (7)

=== Production ===
- Producer, liner Notes – Michael Cuscuna
- Engineer – Kendall Pacios
- Remixing – Nick Jameson and Kendall Pacios
- Mastering – Lee Hulko
- Art Direction – Ed Thrasher
- Photography – Michael Dobo

== Charts and certifications ==
Chart (1972)	Peak position
US Billboard 200	138

Region	Certification	Certified units/sales
United States (RIAA)	Gold	500,000^{^}
^{^} Shipments figures based on certification alone.
