= Rob Fraboni =

American record producer (born 1951)

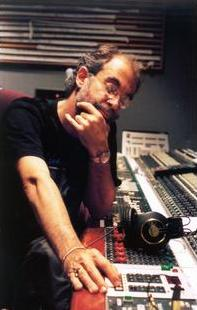

Background information
- Born: Robert Alan Fraboni; 23 April 1951 (age 74); California, United States
- Genres: Rock, Blues, Reggae, Folk music, Roots reggae, Jazz, World music
- Occupation: Producer/Audio Engineer
- Instrument: Drums/percussion
- Years active: 1970 - present
- Labels: Island Records, Elektra Records, Warner Bros. Records, Arista Records, RSO Records

Robert Alan Fraboni (born 23 April 1951) is an American, California-born record producer and audio engineer, well known for his work with Bob Dylan, The Band, Eric Clapton, The Rolling Stones, Tim Hardin, The Beach Boys, Joe Cocker, and Bonnie Raitt, and as Vice President at Island Records where he oversaw the remastering of the entire Bob Marley catalog. He produced the soundtrack on Martin Scorsese's groundbreaking concert movie, The Last Waltz, which included an all-star cast of famous rock and roll performers. He built and designed the legendary Shangri-La studios in Malibu to the specification of Bob Dylan and The Band. Referred to as a "genius" by Keith Richards in his bestselling autobiography Life.

== Early years ==
As a young teenager in southern California, he hitchhiked to Hollywood and sat in on recording sessions with Phil Spector at Gold Star Studios. He moved to New York City in 1971 and studied under Al Grundy at the Institute for Audio Research. From there he began working with Herb Abramson A-1 studios and recorded artists including Dave "Baby" Cortez and Michael Brown. He then went on to work at the Record Plant with engineers Roy Cicala, Jack Adams, Shelly Yakus, Tom Flye, Jack Douglas, Jimmy Iovine, and Dennis Ferrante. While at the Record Plant he worked with musicians including Bob Dylan, Allen Ginsberg, Patti LaBelle & the Bluebelles, Eric Carmen's the Raspberries, and John Lennon.

== The Village Recorder (1972–1976) ==
In 1972 Fraboni moved back to California and was hired as a maintenance engineer at The Village Recorder but was quickly promoted to chief engineer by owner Geordie Hormel. There he engineered "Sail On, Sailor" for The Beach Boys and mixed half of the Holland record, which would be his first album that made it on the charts. He then worked with Jimmy Miller on the Rolling Stones album Goat's Head Soup as well as Planet Waves with Bob Dylan and The Band. Dylan then invited him to be a sound consultant for the Dylan/Band tour in 1974. Also recorded at "the Village" were albums with Joe Cocker (including You Are So Beautiful), Wayne Shorter and Nicholas Tremulis.

== Shangri-La (1976–1985) ==
In 1976, Fraboni designed and built Shangri-La Studios in Malibu, CA, to the precise specifications of Bob Dylan and The Band. He was president and co-owner of the studio for ten years he worked on The Band's Northern Lights – Southern Cross, Eric Clapton's No Reason to Cry, Wayne Shorter's Native Dancer, Bonnie Raitt's Green Light, Tim Hardin's Unforgiven and Blondie Chaplin's self-titled solo debut. Also during this time, he spent 18 months working with Martin Scorsese and The Band on the soundtrack for The Last Waltz, considered one of the greatest concert films ever made. Also during this time, in both Eric Clapton and Pattie Boyd's separate biographies, he is credited with delivering the actual proposal between the two and served as Best Man at their wedding.

== Island Records (1985–1990) ==
In 1985, Fraboni was hired and moved back to New York by Island Records' founder Chris Blackwell as the corporate vice president of Island Records. There he worked closely with Blackwell in all creative aspects of the company, handling signings, A&R, product management, artist development, quality control, and remastering of artists' catalogs. He worked as executive producer on Melissa Etheridge's self-titled debut record; served as music director on the Good to Go Film Project; worked with Robert Palmer; helped remaster U2's Joshua Tree; produced Buckwheat Zydeco, Nick Tremulis, and John Martyn; signed Etta James to Island; sat in on sessions with The Bongos; and went to Barry Diament, to remaster all of Bob Marley's catalog for CD on Tuff Gong in 1989.

== 1990–present ==
After leaving Island just prior to its sale to Polygram, he worked with Phoebe Snow and Wendy Wall. Fraboni started Domino Records in the early '90s, which released recordings by Alvin Lee, John Mooney, Cowboy Mouth, and Rusty Kershaw. With new backing for Ardeo Records in the mid-'90s, he released Ivan Neville's Thanks, Gary Nicholson's The Sky's Not the Limit, and Bellevue Cadillac's Black and White. He produced John Mooney again for the House of Blues release Against the Wall. At Keith Richards' home in Jamaica during Thanksgiving 1995, he and Richards co-produced some of the only nyahbinghi recordings ever made outdoors. Keith's label, Mindless Records released these as The Wingless Angels. He also produced Keith Richards' material on the Rolling Stone's Bridges to Babylon in 1997 as well as served as a sound consultant on the subsequent tour. Fraboni launched his QRS Entertainment in 2003 with About Them Shoes, a recording by Hubert Sumlin which features appearances by Clapton, Keith Richards, and others. The label also has music by Nick Tremulis, Sir Mack Rice, Sean Walshe, and Blondie Chaplin.

== Awards ==
Fraboni was nominated for Producer of the Year at the New York Music Awards in 1989 for a Wendy Wall album on SBK which won Best Folk Album of the Year. He received a Grammy nomination in 1982 for a Bonnie Raitt record, Green Light, as well as a Grammy nomination in 1978 for The Last Waltz movie soundtrack. The Stones' Bridges to Babylon was nominated for Best Rock Album of 1997. He won a Grammy in 2002 for best Country Album for his production of Keith Richards' performance of "You Win Again" on the Hank Williams tribute album, Timeless. For Hubert Sumlin's About Them Shoes he received a 2005 Grammy nomination for "Best Blues Album" and won "Best Blues Album" at The Blues Music Awards in 2006.

== Discography ==
See full discography at Rob Fraboni Discography
