= Little Feat discography =

- Studio albums: 17
- Live albums: 14
- Compilation albums: 5
- Singles: 30
- Video albums: 4
- Box sets: 4

This is the discography of American rock band Little Feat.

== Albums ==
=== Studio albums ===
Title	Album details	Peak chart positions										Certifications
Title	Album details	US	US Indie	AUS	CAN	FIN	NL	NZ	SWE	SWI	UK	Certifications
Little Feat	Released: January 1971; Label: Warner Bros.; Formats: LP	—	—	—	—	—	—	—	—	—	—	
Sailin' Shoes	Released: February 1972; Label: Warner Bros.; Formats: LP, MC	203§	—	—	—	—	—	—	—	—	—	
Dixie Chicken	Released: January 25, 1973; Label: Warner Bros.; Formats: LP, MC, 8-track, reel-to-reel	205§	—	—	—	—	—	—	—	—	—	UK: Silver; US: Gold
Feats Don't Fail Me Now	Released: August 9, 1974; Label: Warner Bros.; Formats: LP, MC, 8-track	36	—	73	40	—	—	—	—	—	—	UK: Silver; US: Gold
The Last Record Album	Released: October 17, 1975; Label: Warner Bros.; Formats: LP, MC, 8-track	36	—	51	—	29	16	36	—	—	36	UK: Silver
Time Loves a Hero	Released: April 15, 1977; Label: Warner Bros.; Formats: LP, MC, 8-track	34	—	48	62	—	—	14	31	—	8	UK: Silver; US: Gold
Down on the Farm	Released: November 14, 1979; Label: Warner Bros.; Formats: LP, MC, 8-track	29	—	41	90	—	—	19	—	—	46	
Let It Roll	Released: August 2, 1988; Label: Warner Bros.; Formats: CD, LP, MC	36	—	77	35	—	—	—	33	27	—	US: Gold
Representing the Mambo	Released: April 10, 1990; Label: Warner Bros.; Formats: CD, LP, MC	45	—	—	42	—	—	—	35	37	—	
Shake Me Up	Released: September 24, 1991; Label: Morgan Creek; Formats: CD, LP, MC	126	—	—	—	—	—	—	—	—	—	
Ain't Had Enough Fun	Released: April 25, 1995; Label: Zoo Entertainment; Formats: CD, 2xLP, MC	154	—	—	—	—	—	—	—	—	—	
Under the Radar	Released: June 16, 1998; Label: CMC International; Formats: CD, MC	—	—	—	—	—	—	—	—	—	—	
Chinese Work Songs	Released: June 20, 2000; Label: CMC International; Formats: CD, MC	—	—	—	—	—	—	—	—	—	—	
Kickin' It at the Barn	Released: October 21, 2003; Label: Hot Tomato; Formats: CD	—	47	—	—	—	—	—	—	—	—	
Join the Band	Released: July 1, 2008; Label: 429; Formats: CD	81	—	—	—	—	—	—	—	—	—	
Rooster Rag	Released: June 26, 2012; Label: Rounder; Formats: CD, 2xLP	—	—	—	—	—	—	—	—	—	—	
Sam's Place	Released: May 17, 2024; Label: Hot Tomato Productions; Formats: CD	—	—	—	—	—	—	—	—	—	—	
Strike Up the Band	Released: May 9, 2025; Label: Hot Tomato Productions; Formats: CD, 2xLP	—	—	—	—	—	—	—	—	—	—	
"—" denotes releases that did not chart or were not released in that territory. § Chart numbers above 200 denote bubbling under the chart.

=== Live albums ===
Title	Album details	Peak chart positions							Certifications
Title	Album details	US	AUS	CAN	NL	NOR	NZ	UK	Certifications
Waiting for Columbus	Released: February 10, 1978; Label: Warner Bros.; Formats: 2xLP, 2xMC, 8-track	18	27	23	29	18	11	43	US: Platinum
Live from Neon Park	Released: June 18, 1996; Label: Zoo Entertainment; Formats: 2xCD, 2xMC	—	—	—	—	—	—	—	
Extended Versions: The Encore Collection	Released: February 1, 2000; Label: BMG; Formats: CD	—	—	—	—	—	—	—	
Raw Tomatos Volume One	Released: June 18, 2002; Label: Hot Tomato; Formats: 2xCD	—	—	—	—	—	—	—	
Ripe Tomatos Volume One	Released: June 18, 2002; Label: Hot Tomato; Formats: 2xCD	—	—	—	—	—	—	—	
Live at the Rams Head	Released: November 5, 2002; Label: Hot Tomato; Formats: 2xCD	—	—	—	—	—	—	—	
Down upon the Suwannee River	Released: July 29, 2003; Label: Hot Tomato; Formats: 2xCD	—	—	—	—	—	—	—	
Highwire Act Live in St. Louis 2003	Released: April 20, 2004; Label: Hot Tomato; Formats: 2xCD	—	—	—	—	—	—	—	
Barnstormin' Live Volume One	Released: May 31, 2005; Label: Hot Tomato; Formats: CD	—	—	—	—	—	—	—	
Barnstormin' Live Volume Two	Released: October 4, 2005; Label: Hot Tomato; Formats: CD	—	—	—	—	—	—	—	
Rocky Mountain Jam	Released: January 23, 2007; Label: Hot Tomato; Formats: CD	—	—	—	—	—	—	—	
Rams Head Revisited	Released: January 11, 2011; Label: Hot Tomato; Formats: CD	—	—	—	—	—	—	—	
Live in Holland 1976	Released: April 17, 2014; Label: Eagle Vision; Formats: CD+DVD	—	—	—	—	—	—	—	
Electrif Lycanthrope	Released: November 26, 2021; Label: Rhino; Formats: CD, 2xLP; First released as a bootleg in 1975	—	—	—	—	—	—	—	
Alive in America '73	Released: January 1, 2023; Label: Renaissance Records; Formats: CD, 3xLP	—	—	—	—	—	—	—	
"—" denotes releases that did not chart or were not released in that territory.

=== Compilation albums ===
Title	Album details	Peak chart positions		
Title	Album details	US	AUS	UK
2 Originals of Little Feat	Released: January 1976; Label: Warner Bros.; Formats: 2xLP; 2-LP set of Little Feat and Dixie Chicken	—	—	—
Hoy-Hoy!	Released: July 29, 1981; Label: Warner Bros.; Formats: 2xLP, MC	39	99	76
As Time Goes By: The Best of Little Feat	Released: August 1986; Label: Warner Bros.; Formats: CD, LP, MC	—	—	—
The Best of Little Feat	Released: September 26, 2006; Label: Warner Bros.; Formats: CD	—	—	—
40 Feat: The Hot Tomato Anthology 1971–2011	Released: September 26, 2011; Label: Proper; Formats: 3xCD	—	—	—
"—" denotes releases that did not chart or were not released in that territory.

=== Box sets ===
Title	Album details
Hotcakes & Outtakes	Released: September 19, 2000; Label: Rhino/Warner; Formats: 4xCD
Barnstormin' Live Volumes One + Two	Released: March 7, 2006; Label: Hot Tomato; Formats: 2xCD
Original Album Series	Released: March 9, 2010; Label: Warner/Rhino; Formats: 5xCD
Rad Gumbo: The Complete Warner Bros. Years 1971–1990	Released: February 25, 2014; Label: Warner Bros.; Formats: 13xCD

=== Video albums ===
Title	Album details
Rockpalast Live	Released: May 16, 2000; Label: Pioneer Artists; Formats: DVD
Kickin' It at the Barn	Released: 2004; Label: Hot Tomato; Formats: DVD
Highwire Act Live in St. Louis 2003	Released: 2004; Label: Eagle Vision; Formats: DVD
Little Feat & Friends in Jamaica – Burgers & Paradise	Released: May 16, 2006; Label: Hot Tomato; Formats: 2xDVD

== Singles ==
Title	Year	Peak chart positions			Album
Title	Year	US Main	US Country	CAN	Album
"Hamburger Midnight"	1970	—	—	—	Little Feat
"Easy to Slip"	1972	—	—	—	Sailin' Shoes
"Dixie Chicken"	1973	—	—	—	Dixie Chicken
"Oh Atlanta"	1974	—	—	—	Feats Don't Fail Me Now
"Spanish Moon"	1975	—	—	—	Feats Don't Fail Me Now
"Long Distance Love"	1976	—	—	—	The Last Record Album
"All That You Dream"	1976	—	—	—	The Last Record Album
"Time Loves a Hero"	1977	—	—	—	Time Loves a Hero
"Oh Atlanta" (live)	1978	—	—	93	Waiting for Columbus
"Wake Up Dreaming	1979	—	—	—	Down on the Farm
"Easy to Slip" (re-release)	1981	—	—	—	Hoy-Hoy!
"Rock and Roll Doctor" [airplay]	1981	34	—	—	Hoy-Hoy!
"Gringo"	1981	—	—	—	Hoy-Hoy!
"Hate to Lose Your Lovin'"	1988	1	—	—	Let It Roll
"Let It Roll"	1988	3	—	—	Let It Roll
"Long Time Till I Get Over You" (promo-only release)	1988	19	—	—	Let It Roll
"One Clear Moment"	1989	10	—	—	Let It Roll
"Rad Gumbo" [airplay]	1989	23	—	—	Road House soundtrack
"Texas Twister" [airplay]	1990	1	—	65	Representing the Mambo
"Woman in Love" [airplay]	1990	21	—	92	Representing the Mambo
"Things Happen"	1991	—	—	—	Shake Me Up
"Shake Me Up" (promo-only release)	1991	14	—	—	Shake Me Up
"Bible Belt" (Travis Tritt featuring Little Feat) [airplay]	1992	—	72	—	It's All About to Change
"Quicksand and Lies" (promo-only release)	1992	—	—	—	White Sands soundtrack
"Shakeytown" (promo-only release)	1995	—	—	—	Ain't Had Enough Fun
"Loco Motives" (promo-only release)	1998	—	—	—	Under the Radar
"Home Ground" (promo-only release)	1998	—	—	—	Under the Radar
"A Distant Thunder"	1998	—	—	—	Under the Radar
"When All Boats Rise"	2021	—	—	—	Non-album singles
"Fat Man in the Bathtub" (45th Anniversary Version)	2021	—	—	—	Non-album singles
"—" denotes releases that did not chart or were not released in that territory.
