= Sam's Place (album) =

2024 album by Little Feat

Studio album by Little Feat
- Released: May 17, 2024
- Genre: Blues
- Label: Hot Tomato
- Producer: Little Feat and Charles A. Martinez

Little Feat chronology
Rooster Rag (2012)	Sam's Place (2024)	Strike Up the Band (2025)

Sam's Place is a blues album by Little Feat, released on May 17, 2024. It was their first studio recording since Rooster Rag in 2012 and the first to feature slide guitarist Scott Sharrard and drummer Tony Leone. It was also their first since the death of their longtime guitarist Paul Barrere in 2019.

The album is a collection of blues standards and is unique in the band's output in that all lead vocals were supplied by their congas player Sam Clayton. Clayton had joined the group in 1972 at the suggestion of their then newly acquired bassist Kenny Gradney, a friend and colleague of Clayton's. Although his deep gruff voice had often featured prominently in the background, he rarely sang lead on a whole song except when onstage, a notable exception being his composition Feel the Groove from Down on the Farm in 1979.

Some of the songs had previously featured in other versions on earlier Feat albums and/or in concert. The opening track, "Milkman", is the only original song on the collection, and is credited to Clayton and guitarists Scott Sharrard and Fred Tackett, although Clayton revealed the lyrics were actually written by his wife Joni.

A bonus single from the sessions, released later in the year, is a cover of "Wang Dang Doodle" which featured backing vocals by former member Shaun Murphy.

Sam's Place was nominated for a Grammy Award for Best Traditional Blues Album.

== Track listing ==
1. "Milkman" (Sam Clayton, Scott Sharrard, Fred Tackett)
2. "You'll Be Mine" (Willie Dixon)
3. "Long Distance Call" (Les Paul, Marshall Sehorn)
4. "Don't Go No Further" (Willie Dixon)
5. "Can't Be Satisfied" (Muddy Waters)
6. "Last Night" (Little Walter)
7. "Why People like That" (Bobby Charles)
8. "Mellow Down Easy" (Willie Dixon)
9. "Got My Mojo Working" (live) (Muddy Waters, Preston Foster)

=== Standalone single ===
- "Wang Dang Doodle" (Willie Dixon)

=== Previous appearances on Little Feat albums ===
- "Can't Be Satisfied" appears on the 1996 live album Live from Neon Park
- "Last Night" appears on Volume One of the 2005 live collection Barnstormin' Live
- "Mellow Down Easy" features as the closing track on the band's previous album, Rooster Rag, in 2012. This was the only song to have appeared previously on a Little Feat studio album.

== Personnel ==
Little Feat

- Sam Clayton – lead vocals, handshaker, percussion
- Bill Payne – keyboards, backing vocals
- Fred Tackett – electric guitars, backing vocals
- Scott Sharrard – slide guitar, resonator guitar, electric guitar, backing vocals
- Kenny Gradney – bass, backing vocals
- Tony Leone – drums, backing vocals

Additional musicians

- Michael LoBue – harmonica
- Art Edmaiston – saxophone
- Marc Franklin – trumpet
- Shaun Murphy – backing vocals on Wang Dang Doodle
- Bonnie Raitt – duet vocals with Sam Clayton on "Long Distance Call"

Production

- Produced by Little Feat and Charles A. Martinez

== Charts ==
Chart (2024)	Peak position
Scottish Albums (OCC)	59
UK Independent Albums (OCC)	26
