= Extended Versions (Little Feat album) =

Live album by Little Feat
- Released: February 1, 2000
- Recorded: June 15, 1998
- Venues: El Rey Theatre Los Angeles, California, U.S.
- Genre: Rock
- Label: BMG Special Products

Professional ratings
Review scores
| Source | Rating |
|---|---|
| Allmusic | 2.5.5/5 stars |
| Rolling Stone | (not rated) |

Extended Versions is a live album by the American rock band Little Feat, recorded at the El Rey Theatre in Los Angeles CA on June 15, 1998, for the Under the Radar album release, and released in 2000.

== Track listing ==
1. "Let It Roll" (Barrere, Kibbee, Payne) – 8:36
2. "Feats Don't Fail Me Now" (Barrere, Kibbee, Payne) – 7:07
3. "Fat Man in the Bathtub " (George) – 6:33
4. "Sailin' Shoes" (George) – 5:11
5. "Hate to Lose Your Lovin'" (Barrere, Fuller) – 4:26
6. "All That You Dream " (Barrere, Payne) – 6:01
7. "Oh, Atlanta" (Payne) – 5:11
8. "Hoy Hoy (Or Blues Don't Tell It All)" – 4:23
9. "Home Ground" (Barrere) – 5:31
10. "Eden's Wall" (Barrere, Murphy, Payne) – 6:25

== Band members ==
- Paul Barrère - guitar, vocals
- Sam Clayton - percussion, vocals
- Kenny Gradney - bass, vocals
- Richard Hayward - drums, vocals
- Shaun Murphy - vocals, percussion
- Bill Payne - keyboards, vocals
- Fred Tackett - guitar, mandolin, trumpet, vocals
