= Rooster Rag =

Studio album by Little Feat
- Released: June 26, 2012
- Studio: Ultratone Studios
- Length: 57:56
- Label: Hot Tomato
- Producer: Bill Payne, Paul Barrere

Little Feat chronology
Join the Band (2008)	Rooster Rag (2012)	Sam's Place (2024)

Professional ratings
Review scores
Source	Rating
AllMusic	3.5/5 stars

Rooster Rag is the fifteenth album by American rock band Little Feat released in June 2012, on the Hot Tomato label. It was their only studio album to feature drummer Gabe Ford and the last to feature guitarist Paul Barrere who died in 2019.

== Background ==
The album marks the band's first original album since 2003's Kickin' It at the Barn and the recording debut with the group of new drummer Gabe Ford who replaced original drummer Richie Hayward following his death in 2010. Four of the songs were written by former Grateful Dead lyricist Robert Hunter in collaboration with keyboard player Bill Payne, now the only musician to have played with every line-up of the group. Surprisingly, Paul Barrere, the group's main writer/singer, was only credited with writing on one track, although his usual co-author Fred Tackett contributed four songs, all of which have appeared on his solo albums, but not all of which he sang lead on here.

The song "Candy Man Blues" by Mississippi John Hurt had already been performed by the band live for some years and appeared on their 2005 collection Barnstormin' Live.

== Reception ==
Reviewing the album for American Songwriter, Hal Harowtz said:

Swampy rhythms? Check. Nasty, cutting slide guitar? Present. A funky combination of blues, country and rock and roll? Oh yeah. Quirky idiosyncratic songwriting? Well, three out of four ain’t bad. ... With keyboardist Billy Payne as the lone remaining original member, Feat stomp and strum their way through a pretty good batch of new tunes that capture the band’s distinctive musical gumbo but aren’t exactly classics on the order of Lowell George’s timeless songs that remain the backbone of the group’s raison d’être. Still, with help from Grateful Dead lyricist Robert Hunter, they’re solid enough and the veteran band sounds fresh, inspired and revived if not exactly young and hungry on their first studio album of original material in twelve years and after losing irreplaceable founding drummer Richie Hayward. Considering their time in the cult trenches, that’s plenty impressive.

Writing for All About Jazz, C. Michael Bailey said:

Rooster Rag reveals the same sophistication of all post-Lowell George-era Little Feat releases, except that this sophistication sounds progressive, more like the band is having a good time making the music. ... This album is something other than greater than the sum of its parts. The blanket presence of Paul Barrere's underrated slide guitar causes this disc to reveal that these seasoned musicians can still draw from their peers.

== Track listing ==
1. "Candy Man Blues" (Mississippi John Hurt) sung by Paul Barrere – 3:04
2. "Rooster Rag" (Bill Payne, Robert Hunter) – 4:35
3. "Church Falling Down" (Fred Tackett) – 5:21
4. "Salome" (Bill Payne, Robert Hunter) – 6:31
5. "One Breath at a Time" (Fred Tackett) sung by Paul Barrere, Sam Clayton and Fred Tackett – 5:16
6. "Just a Fever" (Paul Barrere, Stephen Bruton) – 4:23
7. "Rag Top Down" (Bill Payne, Robert Hunter) – 5:25
8. "Way Down Under" (Bill Payne, Robert Hunter) – 4:05
9. "Jamaica Will Break Your Heart" (Fred Tackett) sung by Paul Barrere – 4:24
10. "Tattooed Girl" (Fred Tackett) – 4:53
11. "The Blues Keep Coming" (Bill Payne, Gabe Ford) – 5:50
12. "Mellow Down Easy" (Willie Dixon) sung by Sam Clayton – 4:08

== Personnel ==
- Paul Barrere – guitars, slide guitar, vocals
- Sam Clayton – congas, vocals
- Gabe Ford – drums, vocals
- Kenny Gradney – bass
- Bill Payne – keyboards, vocals
- Fred Tackett – guitar, vocals, mandolin

== Additional personnel ==
- Larry Campbell – fiddle on "Rooster Rag" and "Salome".
- The Texicali Horns – (Darrell Leonard: trumpets, Joe Sublet: saxophones) on "Jamaica Will Break Your Heart" and " One Breath At A Time"
- Kim Wilson – harmonica on "Mellow Down Easy"
- Johnny Lee Schell – vocals and guitar
- Gary Houston – cover art design
