= Shake Me Up =

Studio album by Little Feat
- Released: September 24, 1991
- Length: 53:29
- Label: Morgan Creek
- Producer: George Massenburg; Bill Payne

Little Feat chronology
Representing the Mambo (1990)	Shake Me Up (1991)	Ain't Had Enough Fun (1995)

Professional ratings
Review scores
Source	Rating
AllMusic	2/5 stars

Shake Me Up is the tenth studio album by the American rock band Little Feat, released in 1991 (see 1991 in music). It was the last album they recorded with frontman Craig Fuller. It was also their only album of original material to feature no lead vocals from keyboardist Bill Payne until the release of Sam's Place.

Among the album's contributors were Bonnie Bramlett (now Sheridan) who had last featured with the group on Dixie Chicken in 1973 and Valerie Carter who had worked closely with the group's founder Lowell George in his latter years. Another backing vocalist, Shaun Murphy, got to sing lead on a line of Spider's Blues (Might Need It Sometime). Murphy would join the group in Craig Fuller's place after he left in 1993.

The album cover art is by Neon Park - the last cover that he provided the group before his death from ALS in 1993.

== Track listing ==
No.	Title	Writer(s)	Length
1.	"Spider's Blues (Might Need it Sometime)"	Barrère; Payne; Tackett	4:19
2.	"Shake Me Up"	Barrère; Fuller; Kibbee; Payne	4:52
3.	"Things Happen"	Barrère; Payne; Tackett	4:25
4.	"Mojo Haiku"	Fuller; Payne	5:12
5.	"Loved and Lied To"	Barrère; Fuller; Hayward; Payne	5:00
6.	"Don't Try So Hard"	Fuller	4:19
7.	"Boom Box Car"	Barrère	4:37
8.	"Fast & Furious"	Barrère; Clayton; Payne; Tackett	4:13
9.	"Livin' on Dreams"	Barrère; Fuller; Payne; Tackett	5:26
10.	"Clownin'"	Barrère; Tackett	4:44
11.	"Down in Flames"	Barrère; Fuller; Kibbee; Park; Payne	6:22

== Personnel ==
Little Feat

- Paul Barrère – vocals, guitar, slide guitar
- Sam Clayton – percussion, backing vocals
- Craig Fuller – vocals, guitar (last album with the group)
- Kenny Gradney – bass
- Richie Hayward – drums, backing vocals
- Bill Payne – keyboards, backing vocals
- Fred Tackett – guitar, acoustic guitar, trumpet

Additional musicians

- Valerie Carter – backing vocals on tracks 4, 5 and 9
- Shaun Murphy – backing vocals on tracks 1, 2, 3, 8 and 10
- Bonnie Sheridan – backing vocals on tracks 3 and 10
- The Memphis Horns – brass on track 3

Production

- George Massenburg – mixing
- Nathaniel Kunkel – assistant engineer
- Doug Sax – mastering engineer
- Alan Yoshida – mastering engineer
- Ivy Skoff – production coordination

Imagery

- Neon Park – cover art
- Kosh – design and art direction
- Melodie Gimpel – photos

== Charts ==
Chart (1991)	Peak position
US Billboard 200	126
