= Live at the Rams Head =

Live album by Little Feat
- Released: November 5, 2002
- Recorded: June 19, 21 and 22, 2001
- Venue: The Ram's Head (Annapolis, MD)
- Length: 70:32
- Label: Hot Tomato
- Producer: Paul Barrère; Bill Payne

Little Feat chronology
Chinese Work Songs (2000)	''Live at the Rams Head'' (2002)	Down Upon the Suwannee River (2003)

Professional ratings
Review scores
Source	Rating
AllMusic	3/5 stars

Live at the Ram's Head is the third live album by the American rock band Little Feat, released in 2002 (see 2002 in music).

== Track listing ==
Disc one

1. "Hate to Lose Your Lovin'" (Barrère, Fuller) – 4:35
2. "Rocket in My Pocket" (George) – 7:13
3. "Honest Man" (George, Tackett) – 6:49
4. "Oh Atlanta" (Payne) – 7:30
5. "Calling the Children Home" (Barrère, Payne, Tackett) – 8:46
6. "Rag Mama Rag" (J. R. Robertson) – 6:50
7. "Shake Me Up" (Barrère, Fuller, Kibbee, Payne) – 4:44
8. "Easy to Slip/I Know You Rider" (George, Kibbee, Traditional) – 8:01
9. "Bed of Roses" (Murphy, Payne) – 4:52
10. "One Clear Moment" (Barrère, Fuller, Payne) – 4:48
11. "Willin'" (George) – 6:15

Disc two

1. "Gringo" (Payne) – 8:35
2. "Cajun Rage" (Barrère, Kibbee, Wray) – 6:20
3. "Cadillac Hotel" (Payne, Wray) – 6:33
4. "Spanish Moon" (George) – 8:36
5. "Skin It Back" (Barrère) – 7:34
6. "Hoy Hoy" (Barrère, Murphy, Payne, Tackett) – 5:32
7. "Let It Roll" (Barrère, Payne, Kibbee) – 10:00
8. "On Your Way Down" (Toussaint) – 8:18
9. "Cajun Girl" (Payne, Kibbee) – 7:29
10. "Feats Don't Fail Me Now" (George, Barrère, Kibbee) – 5:04

== Band members ==
- Paul Barrère - guitar, vocals
- Sam Clayton - percussion, vocals
- Kenny Gradney - bass, vocals
- Richard Hayward - drums, vocals
- Shaun Murphy - vocals, percussion
- Bill Payne - keyboards, vocals
- Fred Tackett - guitar, mandolin, trumpet, vocals

=== Special guest ===
- Ron Holloway - tenor saxophone on "Feats Don't Fail Me Now"
