= Down upon the Suwannee River =

Down Upon the Suwannee River

Live album by Little Feat
- Released: July 29, 2003
- Recorded: October 21, 2000
- Venue: The Spirit Of Suwannee Music Park (Live Oak, FL)
- Label: Hot Tomato
- Producer: Paul Barrère; Bill Payne

Little Feat chronology
Live at the Rams Head (2002)	''Down Upon the Suwannee River'' (2003)	Kickin' It at the Barn (2003)

Professional ratings
Review scores
Source	Rating
AllMusic	3/5 stars

Down Upon the Suwannee River is the fourth live album by the American rock band Little Feat, released in 2003 (see 2003 in music).

== Track listing ==
Disc one

1. "Introduction" – 0:11
2. "All That You Dream" (Paul Barrère, Bill Payne) – 7:40
3. "Spanish Moon" (Lowell George) – 9:55
4. "Skin It Back" (Barrère) – 5:56
5. "Big Bang Theory" (Barrère, Shaun Murphy, Payne, Fred Tackett, Bill Wray) – 6:10
6. "Bed of Roses" (Murphy, Payne) – 4:41
7. "Cajun Girl" (Martin Kibbee, Payne) – 8:01
8. "Sailin' Shoes" (George) – 5:49
9. "Rag Mama Rag" (J. R. Robertson) – 6:43
10. "Let It Roll" (Barrère, Kibbee, Payne) – 11:36

Disc two

1. "Lafayette Railroad" (George, Payne) – 4:33
2. "Dixie Chicken" (George, Fred Martin) – 27:22
3. "Tripe Face Boogie" (Richie Hayward, Payne) – 5:43
4. "It Takes a Lot to Laugh, It Takes a Train to Cry" (Bob Dylan) – 8:49
5. "Oh Atlanta" (Payne) – 5:51
6. "Willin'" (George) – 6:31
7. "Fat Man in the Bathtub" (George) – 7:35

== Personnel ==
- Paul Barrère – vocals, guitar
- Fred Tackett – guitar, mandolin, trumpet, background vocals
- Bill Payne – keyboards, vocals
- Kenny Gradney – bass, background vocals
- Richie Hayward – drums, background vocals
- Sam Clayton – percussion, background vocals
- Shaun Murphy – vocals, hand percussion
