= Live from Neon Park =

Live album by Little Feat
- Released: June 18, 1996
- Recorded: Roseland Theater, Portland, Oregon on December 12–13, 1995; Fillmore Auditorium, San Francisco, California on December 14, 1995; House Of Blues, Los Angeles, California on December 19–20, 1995
- Length: 2:16:02
- Label: Zoo Entertainment
- Producers: Bill Payne; Bill Wray

Little Feat chronology
Ain't Had Enough Fun (1995)	''Live from Neon Park'' (1996)	Under the Radar (1998)

Professional ratings
Review scores
Source	Rating
AllMusic	3/5 stars

Live from Neon Park is the second live album by the American rock band Little Feat, released in 1996. The name of the album was a suggestion of a Little Feat fan in commemoration of the then-recent passing of long-time Little Feat album cover artist and friend of the band, Neon Park.

== Track listing ==
Disc one

1. "Introductions" – 1:47
2. "Two Trains" (Lowell George) – 5:43
3. "Spanish Moon / Skin It Back" (George / Paul Barrère) – 10:23
4. "Rock & Roll Everynight" (P. Barrère, Shaun Murphy, Bill Payne, Fred Tackett, Bill Wray) – 5:07
5. "Down on the Farm" (Gabriel Barrère, P. Barrère) – 6:23
6. "Willin'" (George) – 5:41
7. "Hate to Lose Your Lovin'" (P. Barrère, Craig Fuller) – 4:21
8. "Can't Be Satisfied / They're Red Hot (Hot Tamales)" (Muddy Waters / Robert Johnson) – 4:49
9. "Cadillac Hotel" (Payne, Wray) – 6:50
10. "Changin' Luck" (Fuller, Payne, Tackett) – 7:22
11. "You're Taking Up Another Man's Place" (Isaac Hayes, David Porter) – 6:54
12. "Oh Atlanta" (Payne) – 5:35

Disc two

1. "Texas Twister" (P. Barrère, Martin Kibbee, Payne, Tackett) – 5:17
2. "Fat Man in the Bathtub" (George) – 7:11
3. "Representing the Mambo" (P. Barrère, Neon Park, Payne, Tackett) – 7:51
4. "Long Distance Love" (George) – 3:35
5. "Rad Gumbo" (P. Barrère, Sam Clayton, Kenny Gradney, Kibbee, Park, Payne) – 3:54
6. "Dixie Chicken" (George, Kibbee) – 17:28
7. "Feats Don't Fail Me Now" (P. Barrère, George, Kibbee) – 7:49
8. "Sailin' Shoes" (George) – 5:13
9. "Let It Roll / High Roller (Acoustic)" (P. Barrère, Kibbee, Payne / P. Barrère) – 12:07

== Personnel ==
=== Little Feat ===
- Paul Barrère – guitar, vocals
- Sam Clayton – percussion, vocals
- Kenny Gradney – bass
- Richie Hayward – drums, vocals
- Shaun Murphy – vocals, percussion
- Bill Payne – keyboards, vocals
- Fred Tackett – guitar, mandolin, trumpet

=== Guest musicians ===
- Craig Fuller – vocals, guitar on "Hate To Lose Your Lovin'"
- Inara George (daughter of Lowell) – vocals on "Sailin' Shoes"
- Piero Mariani (husband of Shaun Murphy) – electronic percussion
- Miles Tackett (son of Fred) – guitar on "Dixie Chicken"
- Joel Tepp – clarinet

=== Texicali Horns ===
- Darrell Leonard – trumpet
- Joe Sublett – tenor saxophone
- David Woodford – tenor and baritone saxophone
