= Join the Band (Little Feat album) =

Studio album by Little Feat
- Released: July 1, 2008
- Label: 429 Records
- Producers: Mac McAnally; Bill Payne

Little Feat chronology
Rocky Mountain Jam (2007)	Join the Band (2008)	Rooster Rag (2012)

Professional ratings
Review scores
Source	Rating
HonestTune.com	(not rated)

Join the Band is a 2008 album recorded by Little Feat. Their first studio album in five years, it features no new original songs but is a set of collaborations with other artists such as Bob Seger, Emmylou Harris, Dave Matthews and Inara George. It was released on July 1, 2008.

The album was recorded at Jimmy Buffett's studio and co-produced by Feat keyboard player Bill Payne with Mac McAnally of Buffett's Coral Reefer Band. "Something in the Water" was originally recorded by co-writer Jeffrey Steele.

It also turned out to be the band's last work with singer Shaun Murphy, with whom they parted company in 2009, and with drummer Richie Hayward who died from cancer in 2010.

== Tracks ==
1. "Fat Man in the Bathtub" (Lowell George) featuring Dave Matthews and Sonny Landreth
2. "Something in the Water" (Al Anderson, Jeffrey Steele, Bob DiPiero) featuring Bob Seger and Brad Paisley
3. "Dixie Chicken" (Lowell George, Fred Martin) featuring Vince Gill and Sonny Landreth
4. "See You Later Alligator" (Robert Guidry)
5. "Champion of the World" (Will Kimbrough, Gwil Owen) featuring Jimmy Buffett
6. "The Weight" (Robbie Robertson) featuring Béla Fleck
7. "Don't You Just Know It" (Huey "Piano" Smith)
8. "Time Loves a Hero" (Paul Barrère, Kenny Gradney, Bill Payne) featuring Jimmy Buffett
9. "Willin'" (Lowell George) featuring Brooks & Dunn
10. "This Land Is Your Land" (Woody Guthrie) featuring Mike Gordon
11. "Oh Atlanta" (Bill Payne) featuring Chris Robinson
12. "Spanish Moon" (Lowell George) featuring Craig Fuller and Vince Gill
13. "Trouble" (Lowell George) featuring Inara George
14. "Sailin' Shoes" (Lowell George) featuring Emmylou Harris, Sam Bush and Béla Fleck
15. (Bonus Track) "I Will Play for Gumbo" (Jimmy Buffett) featuring Sam Bush

== Little Feat personnel ==
- Paul Barrère - vocals, guitars
- Sam Clayton - percussion, vocals
- Kenny Gradney - bass
- Richie Hayward - drums, backing vocals
- Shaun Murphy - vocals
- Bill Payne - keyboards, vocals
- Fred Tackett - guitars, mandolin, trumpet, backing vocals

== Charts ==
Chart (2008)	Peak position
UK Independent Albums (Official Charts)	48
US Billboard 200	81
