= Chinese Work Songs =

Studio album by Little Feat
- Released: June 20, 2000
- Length: 61:23
- Label: CMC International
- Producer: Paul Barrere; Bill Payne

Little Feat chronology
Under the Radar (1998)	Chinese Work Songs (2000)	Live at the Rams Head (2002)

Professional ratings
Review scores
Source	Rating
AllMusic	3/5 stars

Chinese Work Songs is the 13th studio album by the American rock band Little Feat, released in 2000.

Four of the album's songs are covers; of "Rag Mama Rag" by The Band, "Sample in a Jar" by Phish, "It Takes a Lot to Laugh, It Takes a Train to Cry" by Bob Dylan and "Gimme a Stone" from the concept album Largo. "Gimme a Stone" marked the only time drummer Richie Hayward sang lead vocals with the group.

== Track listing ==
1. "Rag Mama Rag" (J. R. Robertson) – 4:38
2. "Eula" (Barrère, Tackett) – 4:26
3. "Bed of Roses" (Murphy, Payne) – 4:48
4. "Sample in a Jar" (Anastasio, Marshall) – 4:54
5. "Just Another Sunday" (Murphy, Payne) – 7:52
6. "Gimme a Stone" (Hyman, Chertoff, Forman, Bazilian) – 5:06
7. "Rio Esperenza" (Murphy, Payne) – 4:54
8. "Tattoo Heart" (Barrère, Murphy) – 6:55
9. "Marginal Creatures" (Barrère, Tackett) – 5:16
10. "Chinese Work Songs" (Payne, Tackett) – 6:27
11. "It Takes a Lot to Laugh, It Takes a Train to Cry" (Bob Dylan) – 6:07

== Personnel ==
=== Little Feat ===
- Paul Barrère – vocals, guitar, dobro, bicycle bells
- Sam Clayton – percussion, backing vocals
- Kenny Gradney – bass, backing vocals
- Richie Hayward – drums, vocals
- Shaun Murphy – vocals, percussion
- Bill Payne – keyboards, vocals
- Fred Tackett – guitar, dobro, backing vocals

=== Texicali Horns ===
- Darrell Leonard – trumpet, trombonium
- Joe Sublett – saxophone

=== Additional personnel ===
- Béla Fleck – banjo on Gimme A Stone
- Lenny Castro – percussion
- Piero Mariani – percussion
