= Rocky Mountain Jam =

Live album by Little Feat
- Released: January 23, 2007
- Recorded: March 18, 2005
- Venue: The Boulder Theater, Boulder, Colorado
- Length: 68:40
- Label: Hot Tomato
- Producer: Paul Barrère; Roger Cole

Little Feat chronology
Barnstormin' Live (2005)	Rocky Mountain Jam (2007)	Join the Band (2008)

Rocky Mountain Jam is the ninth live album by the American rock band Little Feat, released in 2007 (see 2007 in music). The album features long improvisational jams on most of the songs including a nod to both Miles Davis' "So What" and the Grateful Dead's "Dark Star" at the beginning of "Dixie Chicken."

== Track listing ==
Disc one

1. "Marginal Creatures" (Barrère, Tackett) – 6:18
2. "One Clear Moment/Sunday Jam" (Barrère, Fuller, Payne) – 11:52
3. "Rocket In My Pocket" (George) – 6:59
4. "Spanish Moon/Skin It Back" (George, Barrère) – 15:34
5. "Dixie Chicken" (George, Martin) – 21:03
6. "Feats Don't Fail Me Now" (Barrère, George, Kibbee) – 6:38

== Band members ==
- Paul Barrère - guitar, vocals, harmonica
- Sam Clayton - percussion, vocals
- Kenny Gradney - bass
- Richard Hayward - drums, vocals
- Shaun Murphy - vocals, percussion
- Bill Payne - keyboards, vocals
- Fred Tackett - guitar, mandolin, trumpet, vocals

== Special guests ==
- Kyle Hollingsworth of The String Cheese Incident plays organ on 'Feats Don't Fail Me Now"
