= Ain't Had Enough Fun =

Studio album by Little Feat
- Released: 1995
- Length: 69:56
- Label: Zoo/Volcano
- Producer: Bill Payne, Bill Wray

Little Feat chronology
Shake Me Up (1991)	Ain't Had Enough Fun (1995)	Live from Neon Park (1996)

Professional ratings
Review scores
Source	Rating
AllMusic	3/5 stars

Ain't Had Enough Fun is the 11th studio album by the American rock band Little Feat, released in 1995 (see 1995 in music). It was their first with female vocalist Shaun Murphy, and was dedicated to the memory of their cover artist Neon Park, who died in 1993.

== Track listing ==
1. "Drivin' Blind" (Bill Payne, Wray) – 5:12
2. "Blue Jean Blues" (Barrère, Payne, Fred Tackett, Wray) – 6:06
3. "Cadillac Hotel" (Payne, Wray) – 5:35
4. "Romance Without Finance" (Clayton, Kibbee, Payne) – 4:05
5. "Big Bang Theory" (Barrère, Murphy, Payne, Tackett, Wray) – 5:32
6. "Cajun Rage" (Barrère, Kibbee, Wray) – 5:30
7. "Heaven's Where You Find It" (Barrère, Murphy, Payne, Tackett) – 5:03
8. "Borderline Blues" (Barrère, Murphy, Payne, Tackett, Wray) – 7:43
9. "All That You Can Stand" (Barrère, Payne, Wray) – 6:35
10. "Rock & Roll Everynight" (Barrère, Murphy, Payne, Tackett, Wray) – 5:06
11. "Shakeytown" (Barrère, Kibbee) – 5:12
12. "Ain't Had Enough Fun" (Barrère, Murphy, Payne, Strand, Tackett) – 3:27
13. "That's a Pretty Good Love" (Lucas, Mendelsohn) – 4:50

== Band members ==
- Paul Barrère – guitar, dobro, vocals
- Sam Clayton – percussion, vocals
- Kenny Gradney – bass
- Richie Hayward – drums, vocals
- Shaun Murphy – vocals, percussion (first album as an official member of the group)
- Bill Payne – keyboards, vocals
- Fred Tackett – guitar, mandolin

== Texicali Horns ==
Tracks 2, 3, 10, & 13

- Darrell Leonard – trumpet
- Joe Sublett – tenor saxophone
- David Woodford – tenor and baritone saxophone

== Additional personnel ==
- Piero Mariani – electronic percussion (tracks 1, 2, 6–9)
- Van Dyke Parks – accordion (track 12)

== Charts ==
Chart (1995)	Peak position
US Billboard 200	145
