= Kickin' It at the Barn =

Studio album by Little Feat
- Released: October 21, 2003
- Label: Hot Tomato
- Producer: Paul Barrere, Bill Payne, Fred Tackett

Little Feat chronology
| Down Upon the Suwannee River (2003) | Kickin' It at the Barn (2003) | Highwire Act Live in St. Louis 2003 (2004) |

Professional ratings
Review scores
| Source | Rating |
|---|---|
| Allmusic | 3/5 stars |

Kickin' It at the Barn is the 14th studio album by the American rock band Little Feat, released in 2003 (see 2003 in music). The album's name came from its recording at guitarist Fred Tackett's barn in Topanga Canyon. Tackett made his debut as a lead vocalist on this album with his own song In A Town Like This, fifteen years after he joined the group. The song also served as the title track of Tackett's solo debut, released the same year.

== Track listing ==
1. "Night on the Town" (Barrère, Tackett) – 6:08
2. "Heaven Forsaken" (Barrère, Tackett) – 4:32
3. "I'd Be Lyin'" (Creamer, Mariani, Murphy) – 5:56
4. "Corazones y Sombras" (Barrère, Bruton, Donnelly, Payne) – 8:04
5. "Walking as Two" (Barrère, Murphy, Payne, Tackett) – 6:23
6. "In a Town Like This" (Tackett) – 4:15
7. "Fighting the Mosquito Wars" (Payne) – 6:43
8. "Stomp" (Payne) – 8:56
9. "Why Don't It Look Like the Way That It Talk" (Barrère, Tackett) – 7:44
10. "I Do What the Telephone Tells Me to Do" (Barrère, Payne, Tackett) – 7:42
11. "Bill's River Blues" (Barrère, Payne) – 5:04

== Personnel ==
Little Feat:

- Paul Barrère - vocals, acoustic & electric guitars, dobro
- Sam Clayton - percussion, vocals
- Kenny Gradney - bass
- Richie Hayward - drums, backing vocals
- Shaun Murphy - vocals, hand percussion
- Bill Payne - vocals, keyboards
- Fred Tackett - vocals, electric guitar, dobro, mandolin, mandocello, trumpet

Additional personnel:

- Larry Campbell - violin
- Nacho Hernandez - accordion
- Jesus "Chuy" Guzman - trumpet, mellophone
- Piero Mariani - percussion

== Charts ==
| Chart (2003) | Peak position |
|---|---|
| US Independent Albums (Billboard) | 47 |
