= Under the Radar (Little Feat album) =

Studio album by Little Feat
- Released: June 16, 1998
- Length: 70:32
- Label: CMC International
- Producer: Paul Barrère; Bill Payne

Little Feat chronology
| Live from Neon Park (1996) | ''Under the Radar'' (1998) | Chinese Work Songs (2000) |

Professional ratings
Review scores
| Source | Rating |
|---|---|
| AllMusic | 3/5 stars |

Under the Radar is the 12th studio album by the American rock band Little Feat, released in 1998 (see 1998 in music). It was the fifth studio album since the band reunited in 1988, and the second since vocalist Shaun Murphy joined the group.

== Track listing ==
1. "Home Ground" (Barrère) – 4:07
2. "Eden's Wall" (Barrère, Murphy, Payne) – 6:33
3. "A Distant Thunder" (Barrère, Murphy, Payne) – 5:36
4. "Hoy Hoy" (Barrère, Murphy, Payne, Tackett) – 4:08
5. "Under The Radar" (Barrère, Murphy, Payne) – 7:14
6. "Vale Of Tears" (Barrère, Murphy, Payne, Tackett) – 6:11
7. "Loco Motives" (Barrère, Murphy, Payne, Tackett) – 5:16
8. "Ferocious Morning" (Barrère, Murphy, Payne, Tackett) – 6:06
9. "Voiceless Territory (Intro to Falling Through the Worlds)" (Barrère, Murphy, Payne, Tackett) – 0:49
10. "Falling Through the Worlds" (Barrère, Murphy, Payne, Tackett) – 5:55
11. "The Blues Don't Tell It All" (Murphy, Payne) – 6:14
12. "I Got Happiness" (Barrère, Murphy) – 4:32
13. "Calling The Children Home" (Barrère, Payne, Tackett) – 7:51

=== Japan bonus track ===
1. "Cat Fever" (Live Version)

== Personnel ==
=== Little Feat ===
- Paul Barrère – vocals, guitar, dobro, dulcimer, harmonica
- Sam Clayton – percussion, backing vocals
- Kenny Gradney – bass, backing vocals
- Richie Hayward – drums, backing vocals
- Shaun Murphy – vocals, tambourine
- Bill Payne – keyboards, vocals
- Fred Tackett – guitar, dobro, trumpet, backing vocals

=== Texicali Horns (tracks 1, 2, and 13) ===
- Darrell Leonard – trumpet, trombonium
- Joe Sublett – saxophone

=== Additional personnel ===
- Lenny Castro – percussion (tracks 1,2)
- Piero Mariani – percussion (tracks 10,11,13)
