= Highwire Act Live in St. Louis 2003 =

Live album by Little Feat
- Released: April 20, 2004
- Recorded: August 22, 2003 St. Louis, MO
- Label: Hot Tomato
- Producer: Paul Barrère, Bill Payne & Fred Tackett

Little Feat chronology
Kickin' It at the Barn (2003)	''Highwire Act Live in St. Louis 2003'' (2004)	Barnstormin' Live (2005)

Professional ratings
Review scores
Source	Rating
AllMusic	3/5 stars

Highwire Act: Live in St. Louis 2003 is the fifth live album by the American rock band Little Feat, released in 2004 (see 2004 in music). There was also a video of the same performance released on DVD.

== Track listing ==
Disc 1

1. "Time Loves a Hero" (Paul Barrère, Kenny Gradney, Bill Payne) – 5:58
2. "Day or Night" (Payne, Fran Tate) – 9:47
3. "Cadillac Hotel" (Payne, Bill Wray) – 6:46
4. "Spanish Moon" (Lowell George) – 8:25
5. "Skin It Back" (Barrère) – 6:40
6. "Cajun Girl" (Kibbee, Payne) – 6:42
7. "Night on the Town" (Barrère, Fred Tackett) – 5:59
8. "I'd Be Lyin'" (Creamer, Mariani, Shaun Murphy) – 5:35
9. "The Blues Don't Tell It All" (Murphy, Payne) – 6:20

Disc 2

1. "Old Folks Boogie" (Barrère, Barrère) – 7:18
2. "Oh Atlanta" (Payne) – 4:52
3. "Dixie Chicken" (George, Martin Kibbee) – 17:44
4. "Tripe Face Boogie" (Richie Hayward, Payne) – 7:18
5. "Fat Man in the Bathtub" (George) – 11:44
6. "Let It Roll" (Barrère, Kibbee, Payne) – 9:29
7. "Willin'" (George) – 8:06
8. "Feats Don't Fail Me Now" (Barrère, George, Kibbee) – 5:23
