= Strike Up the Band (Little Feat album) =

Studio album by Little Feat
- Released: May 9, 2025
- Genre: Rock
- Length: 1:01:42
- Label: Hot Tomato
- Producer: Vance Powell

Little Feat chronology
Sam's Place (2024)	Strike Up the Band (2025)

Singles from Strike Up the Band
- 1. "Midnight Flight" Released: April 3, 2025; 2. "Too High to Cut My Hair" Released: April 21, 2025

Strike Up the Band is the eighteenth studio album by the American rock band Little Feat and their sixteenth to consist primarily of original material and the first of the latter to feature new members Scott Sharrard (vocals/guitars) and Tony Leone (drums/vocals).

== Songs ==
The songs "Too High to Cut My Hair" and "Midnight Flight" were released as digital singles prior to the album coming out. "Bluegrass Pines" had previously been recorded and released by Leftover Salmon in 2014 during Bill Payne's brief period as a member of that group.

== Promotion ==
Strike Up the Band was supported by a tour during 2025 that stopped for two months in June before continuing on August 9, and concluded in October.

== Reception ==
Professional ratings
Aggregate scores
Source	Rating
Metacritic	76/100
Review scores
Source	Rating
Rolling Stone	3.5/5 stars

In a Rolling Stone review, David Browne said the album "still very much sticks with the swampy script" and that it "has the ambiance of the band's classic records — a Mardi Gras that never ends — but it also feels doggedly alive." In a review for Ultimate Classic Rock, music critic Nick DeRiso commented that it "still feels like a new iteration of Little Feat, with Sharrard as the obvious catalyst".

== Track listing ==
Side one

1. "4 Days of Heaven 3 Days of Work" (Bill Payne/Scott Sharrard/Tony Leone) – 5:08
2. "Bayou Mama" (Charlie Starr/Bill Payne) – 4:06
3. "Shipwrecks" (Scott Sharrard) – 4:20
4. "Midnight Flight" (Scott Sharrard) – 4:04

Side two

1. "Too High to Cut My Hair" (Fred Tackett/Scott Sharrard) – 4:54
2. "When Hearts Fall" (Bill Payne/John Leventhal) – 4:40
3. "Strike Up the Band" (Scott Sharrard) – 5:47

Side three

1. "Bluegrass Pines" (Bill Payne/Robert Hunter)– 5:53
2. "Disappearing Ink" (Scott Sharrard) – 3:46
3. "Love and Life (Never Fear)" (Fred Tackett) – 5:23

Side four

1. "Dance a Little" (Bill Payne) – 5:24
2. "Running Out of Time with the Blues" (Tony Leone) – 3:03
3. "New Orleans Cries When She Sings"(Bill Payne/Vince Herman) – 5:34

== Personnel ==
According to the liner notes of the album:

- Kenny Gradney – bass, backing vocals
- Tony Leone – drums, percussion, vocals
- Fred Tackett – electric guitar, mandolin, trumpet, backing vocals
- Sam Clayton – percussion, backing vocals
- Bill Payne – piano, organ, keyboards, vocals, synthesizer
- Scott Sharrard – slide guitar, electric guitar, vocals, acoustic guitar

== Charts ==
Chart (2025)	Peak position
Scottish Albums (OCC)	44
Swiss Albums (Schweizer Hitparade)	63
UK Independent Albums (OCC)	27
