= Barnstormin' Live =

Live album by Little Feat
- Released: 2005

Little Feat chronology
Highwire Act Live in St. Louis 2003 (2004)	Barnstormin' Live (2005)	Rocky Mountain Jam (2007)

Barnstormin' Live is a Little Feat live performance that was first released as two single CD albums, Volume One and Volume Two, in early and late 2005. It was then reissued as a single boxed set in 2006.

== Track listing ==
=== Volume One ===
1. "Rocket in My Pocket" (Lowell George)
2. "Keepin' Up with the Joneses" (Paul Barrère, Lowell George)
3. "Changin' Luck" (Craig Fuller, Bill Payne, Fred Tackett)
4. "Spider's Blues" (Paul Barrère, Bill Payne, Fred Tackett)
5. "One Clear Moment" (Craig Fuller, Paul Barrère, Bill Payne) > "Just Another Sunday" (Bill Payne, Shaun Murphy)
6. "Walkin' as Two" (Paul Barrère, Shaun Murphy, Bill Payne, Fred Tackett)
7. "Last Night" (Little Walter)
8. "Roll Um Easy" (Lowell George)
9. "The Blues Don't Tell It All" (Shaun Murphy, Bill Payne)
10. "Why Don't It Look Like the Way That It Talk" (Paul Barrère, Fred Tackett)

=== Volume Two ===
1. "Down on the Farm" (Paul Barrère, Gabriel Barrère) / "Candy Man Blues" (Mississippi John Hurt)
2. "Under the Radar" (Bill Payne, Shaun Murphy, Paul Barrère)
3. "Fool Yourself" (Fred Tackett)
4. "Sailin' Shoes" (Lowell George)
5. "Night on the Town" (Paul Barrère, Fred Tackett)
6. "Apolitical Blues" (Lowell George)
7. "Distant Thunder" (Bill Payne, Shaun Murphy, Paul Barrère)
8. "Six Feet of Snow" (Lowell George, Keith Godchaux)
9. "Fighting the Mosquito Wars" (Bill Payne)
10. "Day at the Dog Races" (Paul Barrère, Sam Clayton, Kenny Gradney, Richie Hayward, Bill Payne)

== Personnel ==
- Paul Barrère: vocals, guitar, harmonica
- Sam Clayton: percussion, vocals
- Kenny Gradney: bass
- Richie Hayward: drums, backing vocals
- Shaun Murphy: vocals, tambourine
- Bill Payne: vocals, keyboards
- Fred Tackett: guitar, mandolin, trumpet, vocals
