= Fred Tackett =

American guitarist and songwriter (born 1945)

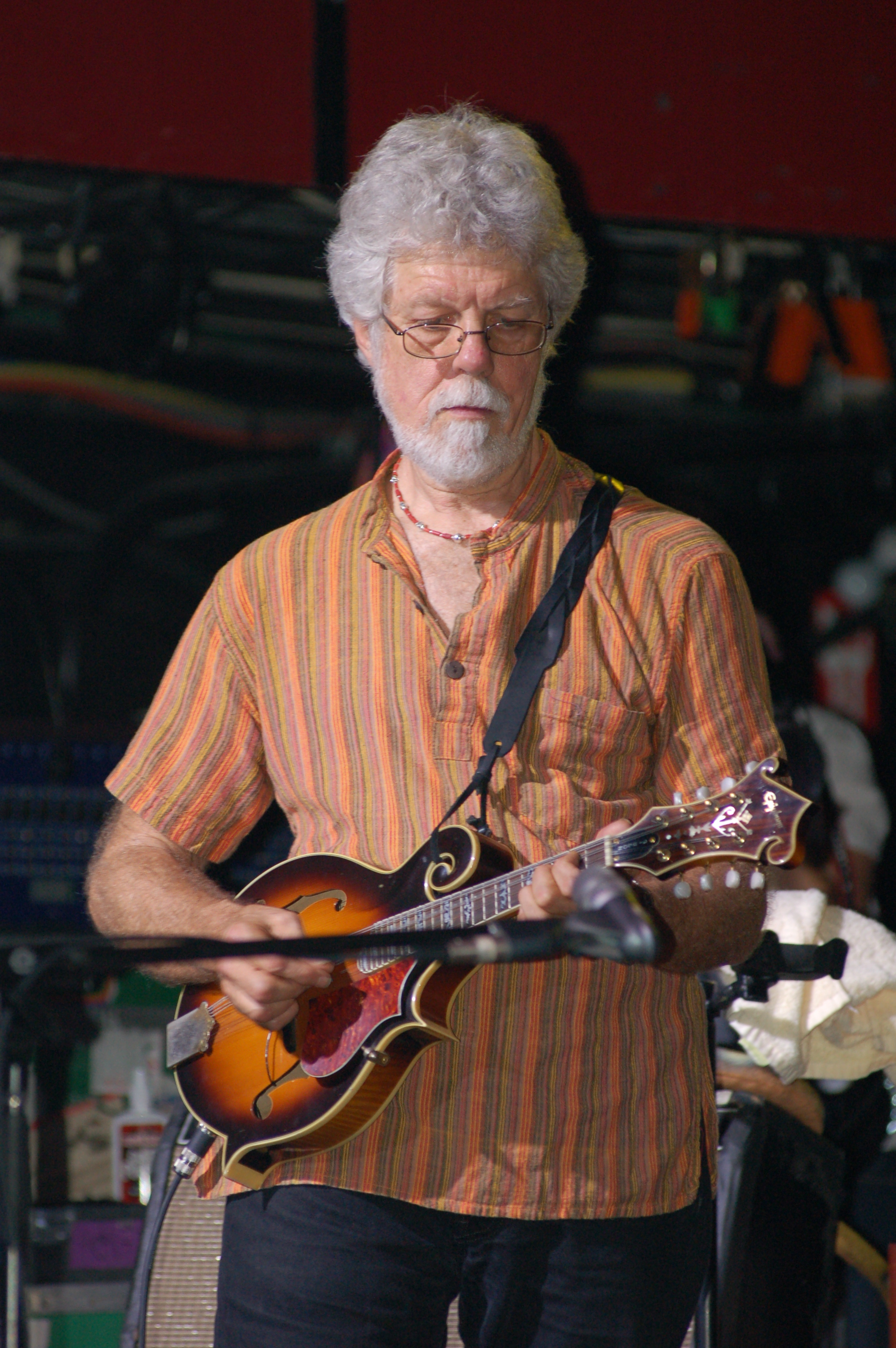
- Tackett in 2009

Background information
- Born: Fredrick O. Tackett; August 30, 1945 (age 81)
- Origin: Little Rock, Arkansas
- Genres: Rock; southern rock; blues; Americana; swamp rock
- Occupations: Musician; songwriter
- Instruments: Guitar; mandolin; trumpet; vocals
- Years active: 1972–present
- Labels: Warner Bros. Records; CMC International; Tower Records/Hot Tomato Imprint; Antilles Records
- Website: paulandfred.com

Fredrick O. Tackett (born August 30, 1945) is an American songwriter and multi-instrumentalist. Originally a session player on guitar, mandolin, and trumpet, he is best known as a member of the band Little Feat.

In addition to his work with Little Feat, Tackett has played and recorded with many notable artists, Bob Dylan and Jimmy Webb among them. He had an additional side project with another member of Little Feat; he performed as part of a duo with Paul Barrere, as Paul and Fred.

== Association with Little Feat ==
Tackett's association with Little Feat goes back to a friendship with the founder of the band, Lowell George, at the time of its inception. Working as a session player for other musicians, he continued his friendship with the bandmates, and contributed a song "Fool Yourself" to their third album Dixie Chicken as well as acoustic guitar. He also contributed guitar to their sixth album Time Loves a Hero.

In 1979 he co-wrote songs with Lowell George for both George's first (and only) solo project Thanks, I'll Eat It Here, and Little Feat's album Down on the Farm. It was during work on the latter that the group's break-up was announced. Lowell George died shortly afterwards.

In 1983, he performed on the Antilles Records release Swingrass '83.

== Joining Little Feat ==
In 1988, Little Feat reformed despite the absence of their former front man, prolific singer, songwriter, and slide guitarist, Lowell George. The regrouped Little Feat included former members Paul Barrere, Richie Hayward, Bill Payne, Kenny Gradney, and Sam Clayton, with the addition of Tackett and Craig Fuller. Fuller left in 1993, to be replaced by female vocalist Shaun Murphy who remained with the group until 2009 when they pared back down to a six-piece. Tackett has remained with Little Feat since the day he joined, and has become an integral member of the band.

Tackett has played a pivotal role in Little Feat's music. In addition to his guitar work, he plays trumpet and mandolin and has co-written several of their songs. Between 1991 and 2003, he forged an active and regular writing partnership with Paul Barrere which has produced such songs as "Marginal Creatures" and "Night On The Town". The 2003 album Kickin' It at the Barn featured Tackett's debut as a lead vocalist on his own song "In a Town Like This" which was also the title track from his debut solo album released that year on Feat's Hot Tomato label. A second effort, Silver Strings followed in 2010.

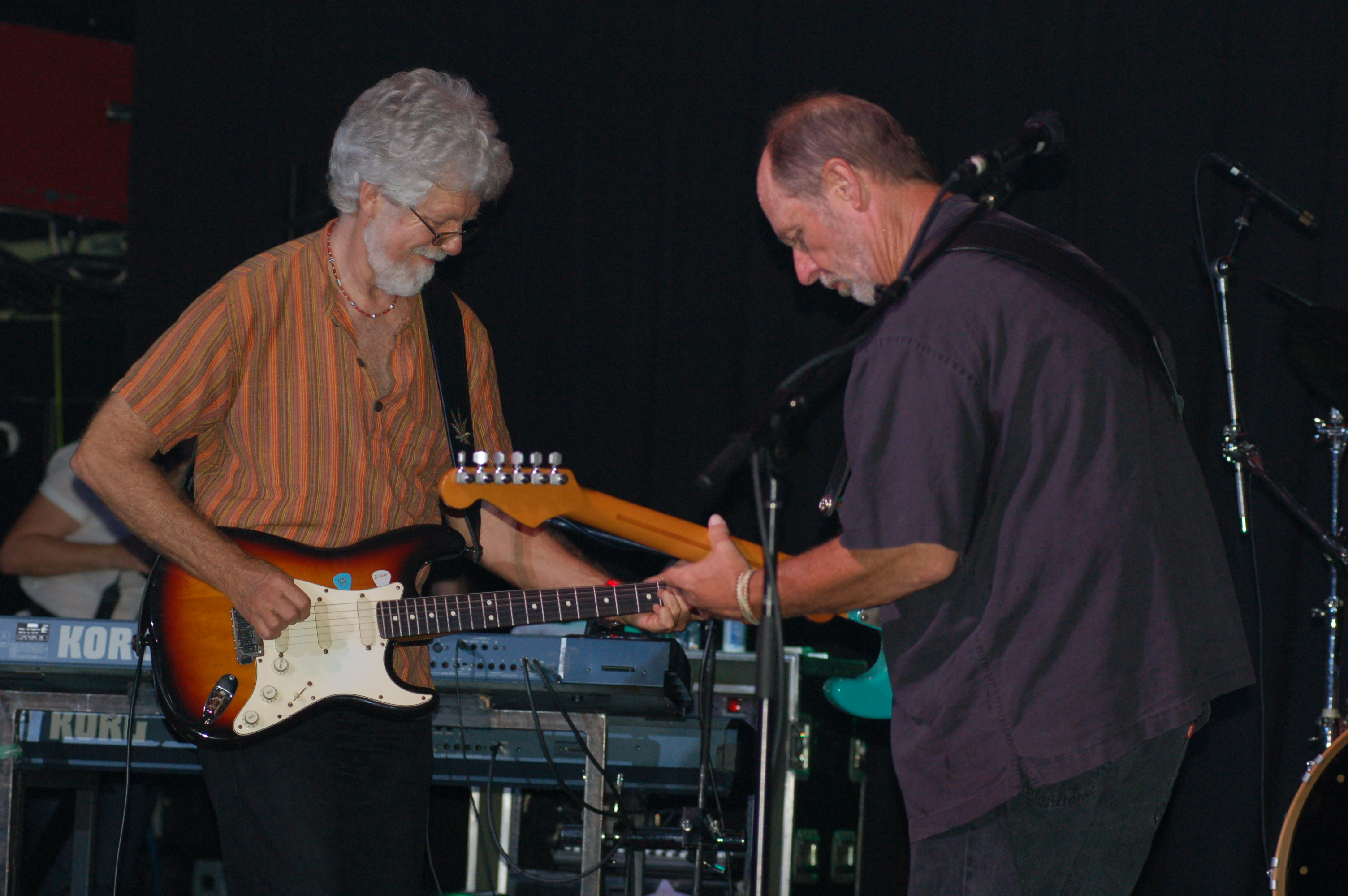
Paul and Fred playing as a duo

== Paul and Fred ==
Tackett's writing partnership with Barrere developed into a separate act where the two performed as a duo. This produced two live albums and a DVD. They also spent time between gigs when touring to perform in local radio stations, playing songs that did not require a lot of changing of instruments, to travel as lightly as possible. Sadly this was brought to an end by Barrere's death from cancer in 2019.

== Discography ==
=== As Little Feat session musician ===
- Dixie Chicken 1973
- Time Loves a Hero 1977
- Down on the Farm 1979

=== As Little Feat group member ===
- Let It Roll 1988
- Representing the Mambo 1990
- Shake Me Up 1991
- Ain't Had Enough Fun 1995
- Under the Radar 1998
- Chinese Work Songs 2000
- Kickin' It at the Barn 2003
- Join The Band 2008
- Rooster Rag 2012
- Sam’s Place 2024
- Strike Up The Band 2025

=== Little Feat Live albums ===
- Live From Neon Park 1996
- Live at the Rams Head 2002
- Down Upon the Suwannee River 2003
- Highwire Act Live in St. Louis 2003 2004
- Barnstormin' Live 2005
- Rocky Mountain Jam 2007

=== Little Feat Live compilations ===
- Ripe Tomatos Volume One 2002
- Raw Tomatos Volume One 2002

=== Paul and Fred ===
- Live from North Cafe 2001
- Sights and Sounds DVD 2005
- Live in the UK 2008 2009

=== Solo ===
- In a Town Like This 2003
- Silver Strings 2010

== Collaborations ==
With Peter Allen

- I Could Have Been a Sailor (A&M Records, 1979)
- Not the Boy Next Door (Arista Records, 1983)

With Deborah Allen

- Cheat the Night (RCA Records, 1983)

With Paul Anka

- The Music Man (United Artists Records, 1977)
- Headlines (RCA Victor, 1979)

With Joan Baez

- Recently (Gold Castle, 1987)

With Russ Ballard

- At the Third Stroke (Epic Records, 1978)

With Carole Bayer Sager

- Sometimes Late at Night (The Broadwark Entertainment, 1981)

With Clint Black

- Looking for Christmas (RCA Records, 1995)
- Nothin' but the Taillights (RCA Records, 1997)
- Christmas with You (Equity, 2004)

With Alfie Boe

- Trust (Decca Records, 2013)

With Debby Boone

- Surrender (Sparrow Records, 1983)

With Elkie Brooks

- Live and Learn (A&M Records, 1979)

With Jackson Browne

- The Pretender (Asylum Records, 1976)

With Glen Campbell

- Rhinestone Cowboy (Capitol Records, 1975)
- Bloodline (Capitol Records, 1976)
- Southern Nights (Capitol Records, 1977)
- Basic (Capitol Records, 1978)
- Highwayman (Capitol Records, 1979)
- It's the World Gone Crazy (Capitol Records, 1981)

With Eric Carmen

- Change of Heart (Arista Records, 1978)
- Tonight You're Mine (Arista Records, 1980)

With The Carpenters

- Made in America (A&M Records, 1981)
- Voice of the Heart (A&M Records, 1983)

With Valerie Carter

- Just a Stone's Throw Away (Columbia Records, 1977)
- Wild Child (ARC, 1978)

With Cher

- Stars (Warner Bros. Records, 1975)

With Cher and Gregg Allman

- Two the Hard Way (Warner Bros. Records, 1977)

With Rita Coolidge

- It's Only Love (A&M Records, 1975)
- Satisfied (A&M Records, 1979)
- Heartbreak Radio (A&M Records, 1981)
- Dancing with an Angel (Attic, 1991)

With Judy Collins

- Hard Times for Lovers (Elektra Records, 1979)

With A. J. Croce

- A. J. Croce (Private Music, 1993)

With Patti Dahlstrom

- Your Place or Mine (20th Century Records, 1975)

With Joe Dassin

- Blue Country (CBS, 1979)

With Neil Diamond

- Heartlight (Columbia Records, 1982)

With The 5th Dimension

- Portrait (Bell, 1970)
- Love's Lines, Angles and Rhymes (Bell, 1971)
- Individually & Collectively (Bell, 1972)
- Living Together, Growing Together (Bell, 1973)
- Earthbound (ABC Records, 1975)

With Bob Dylan

- Saved (Columbia Records, 1980)
- Shot of Love (Columbia Records, 1981)
- The Bootleg Series Vol. 13: Trouble No More 1979–1981 (Columbia Records, 2017)

With Fleetwood Mac

- Time (Warner Bros. Records, 1995)

With Ted Gärdestad

- Blue Virgin Isles (Polar, 1978)

With Lowell George

- Thanks, I'll Eat It Here (Warner Bros. Records, 1979)

With Vince Gill

- When I Call Your Name (MCA Records, 1989)

With Arlo Guthrie

- Power of Love (Warner Bros. Records, 1981)

With Danniebelle Hall

- This Moment (Light Records, 1975)
- He Is King (Light Records, 1976)
- Let Me Have a Dream (Light Records, 1977)

With Steve Harley

- Hobo with a Grin (EMI, 1978)

With Richard Harris

- The Yard Went On Forever (Dunhill Records, 1968)

With Marcia Hines

- Ooh Child (Miracle Records, 1979)

With Thelma Houston

- Sunshower (Dunhill Records, 1969)
- Breakwater Cat (RCA Records, 1980)

With Janis Ian

- Restless Eyes (Columbia Records, 1981)

With Rickie Lee Jones

- Rickie Lee Jones (Warner Bros. Records, 1979)

With Christine Lakeland

- Veranda (Comet Records, 1984)

With Nicolette Larson

- Nicolette (Warner Bros. Records, 1978)
- In the Nick of Time (Warner Bros. Records, 1979)
- Radioland (Warner Bros. Records, 1981)
- All Dressed Up and No Place to Go (Warner Bros. Records, 1982)

With Lori Lieberman

- A Piece of Time (Capitol Records, 1974)

With Kenny Loggins

- Keep the Fire (Columbia Records, 1979)
- The Unimaginable Life (Columbia Records, 1997)

With Mary MacGregor

- ...In Your Eyes (Ariola Records, 1978)

With Barry Manilow

- Barry (Arista Records, 1980)

With Jeane Manson

- Stand by Me (CBS Records, 1980)

With Clair Marlo

- Let it Go (Sheffield Lab, 1989)

With Johnny Mathis

- Once in a While (Columbia Records, 1988)

With Michael McDonald

- Blink of an Eye (Reprise Records, 1993)

With Mephistopheles

- In Frustration I Hear Singing (Reprise Records, 1969)

With Bette Midler

- Broken Blossom (Atlantic Records, 1977)

With Adam Mitchell

- Redhead in Trouble (Warner Bros. Records, 1979)

With Tim Moore

- White Shadows (Asylum Records, 1977)

With Anne Murray

- The Hottest Night of the Year (Capitol Records, 1982)

With Michael Martin Murphey

- Michael Martin Murphey (Liberty Records, 1982)

With Willie Nelson

- Across the Borderline (Columbia Records, 1993)

With Aaron Neville

- The Grand Tour (A&M Records, 1993)

With Juice Newton

- Well Kept Secret (Capitol Records, 1978)
- Take Heart (Capitol Records, 1979)
- Juice (Capitol Records, 1981)
- Quiet Lies (Capitol Records, 1982)
- Dirty Looks (Capitol Records, 1983)
- Can't Wait All Night (RCA Records, 1984)
- Old Flame (RCA Records, 1985)

With Harry Nilsson

- Sandman (RCA Victor, 1976)
- ...That's The Way It Is (RCA Victor, 1976)
- Flash Harry (Mercury Records, 1980)

With The Oak Ridge Boys

- American Dreams (MCA Records, 1988)

With Van Dyke Parks

- Jump! (Warner Bros. Records, 1984)

With Van Dyke Parks and Brian Wilson

- Orange Crate Art (Warner Bros. Records, 1995)

With Dolly Parton

- Heartbreak Express (RCA Records, 1982)

With The Pointer Sisters

- Energy (Planet Records, 1978)

With Michel Polnareff

- Michel Polnareff (Atlantic Records, 1975)

With Eddie Rabbitt

- Rabbitt Trax (RCA Records, 1986)

With Bonnie Raitt

- Home Plate (Warner Bros. Records, 1975)
- Sweet Forgiveness (Warner Bros. Records, 1977)

With Collin Raye

- All I Can Be (Epic Records, 1991)

With Helen Reddy

- Music, Music (Capitol Records, 1976)

With Johnny Rivers

- Outside Help (Big Tree Records, 1977)

With Lionel Richie

- Lionel Richie (Motown Records, 1982)
- Can't Slow Down (Motown Records, 1983)

With Bruce Roberts

- Bruce Roberts (Elektra Records, 1977)

With Kenny Rogers

- Share Your Love (Liberty Records, 1981)
- Love Will Turn You Around (Liberty Records, 1982)
- We've Got Tonight (Liberty Records, 1983)
- Eyes That See in the Dark (RCA Records, 1983)
- What About Me? (RCA Records, 1984)
- The Heart of the Matter (RCA Records, 1985)
- I Prefer the Moonlight (RCA Records, 1987)

With Kenny Rogers and Dolly Parton

- Once Upon a Christmas (RCA Records, 1984)

With Linda Ronstadt

- We Ran (Elektra Records, 1998)

With Brenda Russell

- Brenda Russell (Horizon Records, 1979)

With Sanne Salomonsen

- Language of the Heart (Virgin Records, 1994)

With Sanford & Townsend

- Duo-Glide (Warner Bros. Records, 1977)

With Leo Sayer

- Thunder in My Heart (Chrysalis Records, 1977)
- Leo Sayer (Chrysalis Records, 1978)
- Here (Chrysalis Records, 1979)

With Boz Scaggs

- Silk Degrees (Columbia Records, 1976)
- Some Change (Virgin Records, 1994)
- Fade into Light (MVP Japan, 1996)
- Come on Home (Virgin Records, 1997)

With Bob Seger

- Like a Rock (Capitol Records, 1986)
- The Fire Inside (Capitol Records, 1991)
- It's a Mystery (Capitol Records, 1995)

With Carly Simon

- Another Passenger (Elektra Records, 1976)

With Tom Snow

- Tom Snow (Capitol Records, 1976)

With JD Souther

- You're Only Lonely (Columbia Records, 1979)

With Ringo Starr

- Stop and Smell the Roses (RCA Records, 1981)

With Rod Stewart

- Atlantic Crossing (Warner Bros. Records, 1975)
- A Night on the Town (Warner Bros. Records, 1976)
- Foot Loose & Fancy Free (Warner Bros. Records, 1977)
- Blondes Have More Fun (Warner Bros. Records, 1978)

With Barbra Streisand

- Wet (Columbia Records, 1979)

With The Supremes

- The Supremes Produced and Arranged by Jimmy Webb (Motown, 1972)

With Livingston Taylor

- Three Way Mirror (Epic Records, 1978)

With Captain & Tennille

- Make Your Move (Casablanca Records, 1979)

With Richard Thompson

- Amnesia (Capitol Records, 1988)

With Tanya Tucker

- Should I Do It (MCA Records, 1981)

With Valdy

- See How the Years Have Gone By (A&M Records, 1975)

With Tom Waits

- Swordfishtrombones (Island Records, 1983)

With The Wallflowers

- Bringing Down the Horse (Interscope Records, 1996)

With Jennifer Warnes

- Famous Blue Raincoat (Cypress Records, 1986)

With Jimmy Webb

- Words and Music (Reprise Records, 1970)
- And So: On (Reprise Records, 1971)
- Letters (Reprise Records, 1972)
- Land's End (Asylum Records, 1974)
- El Mirage (Atlantic Records, 1977)
- Angel Heart (Real West, 1982)

With Lauren Wood

- Lauren Wood (Capitol Records, 1979)

With Jesse Colin Young

- The Perfect Stranger (Elektra Records, 1982)
