= Rad Gumbo: The Complete Warner Bros. Years 1971–1990 =

Compilation album by Little Feat
- Released: 2014
- Recorded: 1969–1990
- Label: Warner Bros.
- Producer: Bill Payne, George Massenburg, Paul Barrère

Little Feat chronology
Ram's Head Revisited (2010)	Rad Gumbo: The Complete Warner Bros. Years 1971–1990 (2014)

Professional ratings
Review scores
Source	Rating

Rad Gumbo: The Complete Warner Bros. Years 1971–1990 is a 2014 collection recorded by Little Feat and released by Rhino/Warner Bros. Records.

Little Feat were an active group recording for Warner Bros Records from the first album, 1971's Little Feat, through to their break-up in 1979, the last album being that year's Down on the Farm, and then for the first two albums of their reunion, 1988's Let It Roll and 1990's Representing the Mambo.

The albums included in this collection are all of the band's studio albums up to 1990, the 1978 live album Waiting for Columbus (represented by its 2002 2-disc expanded version), the 1981 compilation Hoy-Hoy!, and Outtakes from Hotcakes, an edited version of the rarities disc from 2000's Hotcakes & Outtakes box set (the pre-Warner Bros. demo recordings included in that set are not included).

All the albums are on CD presented in mini-LP style packaging.
