= Let It Roll (Little Feat album) =

Studio album by Little Feat
- Released: August 2, 1988
- Recorded: The Complex, Los Angeles
- Length: 50:00
- Label: Warner Bros.
- Producers: George Massenburg, Bill Payne

Little Feat chronology
Hoy-Hoy! (1981)	Let It Roll (1988)	Representing the Mambo (1990)

Audio sample
- 26 seconds of "Hate to Lose Your Lovin'": file; help

Professional ratings
Review scores
Source	Rating
AllMusic	3/5 stars

Let It Roll is the eighth studio album by the American rock band Little Feat, released in 1988. Eight of the ten songs on the album were co-written by new band member Craig Fuller, the founding member of Pure Prairie League. Fuller also takes most lead vocals. The album attained RIAA certified gold status on February 14, 1989. It is the first Little Feat studio album without Lowell George, after his death in 1979 and is one of their most successful albums, sparking a comeback by the band. The first single, "Hate to Lose Your Lovin'", earned the band their first #1 hit on the Mainstream Rock Tracks chart. The album was nominated for the Grammy Award for Best Engineered Album, Non-Classical.

== Reception ==
Reviewing the album for AllMusic, Stephen Thomas Erlewine, said:

What's surprising about Let It Roll is not just that it works, but that it works smashingly. It sounds as if the group picked up after The Last Record Album, deciding to return to the sound of Feats Don't Fail Me Now. True, the songwriting might not have the idiosyncratic genius of George, but it's strong, catchy and memorable, from the fine singles "Hate to Lose Your Lovin'" and "Let it Roll" to album tracks. More importantly, the band sounds lively and playful - Little Feat hasn't sounded this good in the studio since Feats, so it's easy to see why the members wanted to regroup. Yes, George is missed - it's hard not to miss such a gifted songwriter and musician - but Let It Roll isn't disrespectful of his memory, it keeps his music alive, which is the greatest compliment it can be paid.

== Track listing ==
No.	Title	Writer(s)	Length
1.	"Hate to Lose Your Lovin'"	Paul Barrère, Craig Fuller	4:21
2.	"One Clear Moment"	Barrère, Fuller, Bill Payne	4:49
3.	"Cajun Girl"	Martin Kibbee, Payne	3:53
4.	"Hangin' on to the Good Times"	Barrère, Fuller, Payne, Fred Tackett	4:46
5.	"Listen to Your Heart"	Fuller, Payne	5:51
6.	"Let It Roll"	Barrère, Kibbee, Payne	4:30
7.	"Long Time Till I Get over You"	Barrère, Fuller	4:51
8.	"Business as Usual"	Barrère, Fuller, Payne	4:25
9.	"Changin' Luck"	Fuller, Payne, Tackett	6:17
10.	"Voices on the Wind"	Barrère, Fuller, Payne, Tackett	6:17

== Personnel ==
=== Band members ===
- Paul Barrère – guitar, vocals
- Sam Clayton – percussion, vocals
- Craig Fuller – vocals, button accordion and sometimes guitar (first album with the group)
- Kenny Gradney – bass guitar
- Richie Hayward – drums, vocals
- Bill Payne – keyboards, vocals
- Fred Tackett – guitar, mandolin, trumpet (first album as an official member of the group)

=== Additional personnel ===
- Renée Armand – vocals
- Marilyn Martin – vocals
- Shaun Murphy – vocals
- Bonnie Raitt – vocals
- Linda Ronstadt – vocals
- Bob Seger – vocals

=== Production ===
- George Massenburg and Bill Payne – Producers
- George Massenburg – Recording and Mix Engineer
- Sharon Rice and Kenny Fowler – Assistant Engineers
- Ivy Skoff – Production Coordinator
- Edd Kolakowski – Piano Technician

=== Album cover design ===
Neon Park

== Charts ==
Chart (1988)	Peak position
Australian Albums (Kent Music Report)	77
Canada Top Albums/CDs (RPM)	35
Swedish Albums (Sverigetopplistan)	33
Swiss Albums (Schweizer Hitparade)	27
US Billboard 200	36

== Certifications ==
Region	Certification	Certified units/sales
United States (RIAA)	Gold	500,000^{^}
^{^} Shipments figures based on certification alone.
