= Representing the Mambo =

Studio album by Little Feat
- Released: April 10, 1990
- Recorded: July 1989–January 1990
- Studios: Skywalker Ranch (Marin County); Ocean Way (Hollywood); The Hit Factory (New York City)
- Genres: Country rock; blues; jazz rock
- Length: 50:49
- Label: Warner Bros.
- Producers: George Massenburg, Bill Payne

Little Feat chronology
Let It Roll (1988)	Representing the Mambo (1990)	Shake Me Up (1991)

Representing the Mambo is the ninth studio album by the American rock band Little Feat, released in 1990. It peaked at No. 45 on the Billboard 200 and was supported by a North American tour. "Texas Twister" and "Rad Gumbo" were released as singles.

== Production ==
The majority of the album was recorded at Skywalker Ranch, following a week's worth of work in Los Angeles. The album cover art is by Neon Park. Craig Fuller, Bill Payne, and Paul Barrère sing on Representing the Mambo.

"Those Feat'll Steer Ya Wrong Sometimes" is about a band member failing to get out of a speeding ticket. "Teenage Warrior" is about gang warfare in Los Angeles.

== Critical reception ==
Professional ratings
Review scores
Source	Rating
AllMusic	2/5 stars
Calgary Herald	C−
Chicago Sun-Times	3/4 stars
The Encyclopedia of Popular Music	2/5 stars
Los Angeles Times	3/5 stars
Ottawa Citizen	2/5 stars
The Rolling Stone Album Guide	3/5 stars

The Calgary Herald wrote that "one or two tunes sound interesting (the album has a Steely Dan-like studio polish to it), but nothing holds up to even cursory scrutiny." The Sun-Sentinel opined that "though the band still packs a tremendous one-two punch with its rich mix of country rock and blues, the crackle that marked Let it Roll, as well as previous releases, is nowhere to be found." The Chicago Sun-Times praised "the evocative, cinematic title cut."

The Ottawa Citizen noted that "there are hints of the post-psychedelic country-rock of Little Feat's infancy, which usually rings stale." The St. Petersburg Times determined that "some of the new album treads closely to standard rock-radio fare." The Times deemed Representing the Mambo "a more full-tilt slice of Southern rock-a-boogie funk."

== Track listing ==
1. "Texas Twister" (Barrère, Kibbee, Payne, Tackett) – 4:45
2. "Daily Grind" (Barrère, Fuller, Payne) – 5:06
3. "Representing the Mambo" (Barrère, Park, Payne, Tackett) – 5:54
4. "Woman in Love" (Barrère, Payne, Tackett) – 3:49
5. "Rad Gumbo" (Barrère, Clayton, Gradney, Kibbee, Park, Payne) – 3:29
6. "Teenage Warrior" (Barrère, Fuller, Payne, Tackett) – 4:53
7. "That's Her, She's Mine" (Barrère, Clayton, Payne) – 4:09
8. "Feelin's All Gone" (Fuller) – 4:59
9. "Those Feat'll Steer Ya Wrong Sometimes" (Barrère, Fuller, Hayward, Payne, Tackett) – 5:01
10. "The Ingenue" (Barrère, Fuller, Payne, Tackett) – 4:22
11. "Silver Screen" (Barrère, Payne, Tackett) – 4:22

== Personnel ==
Adapted from the album's liner notes.

Little Feat

- Bill Payne – piano (1, 3–5, 7–10, 11), keyboards (2, 6, 10, 11), synthesizers (1, 3, 4–6, 10, 11), organ (2), lead vocals (3, 11), backing vocals (10), horn arrangements (10)
- Paul Barrère – guitar (1–3, 6, 9, 11), slide guitar (4, 5, 7, 8), dobro (9), lead vocals (1, 4, 5, 7, 10), backing vocals
- Fred Tackett – lead guitar (1, 4–7), rhythm guitar (1, 2, 4, 5, 7, 10, 11), acoustic guitar (3, 8, 9), trumpet (1, 4, 10)
- Kenny Gradney – bass guitar
- Richie Hayward – drums, backing vocals (1, 4, 5, 9)
- Sam Clayton – percussion, backing vocals (1, 4, 5, 9), scat vocals (10)
- Craig Fuller – backing vocals (1, 4), lead vocals (2, 6, 8, 9), rhythm guitar (8)

Additional musicians

- Peter Asher – dialogue (3)
- Neon Park – dialogue (3)
- Marilyn Martin – backing vocals (3, 11), dialogue (3)
- Sharon Celani – backing vocals (3), dialogue (3)
- Shaun Murphy – backing vocals (7)
- Renée Armand – backing vocals (9)
- Michael Brecker – saxophone (10)

Technical

- Produced by George Massenburg and Bill Payne
- Engineered by George Massenburg
- Assistant engineer – Nathaniel Kunkel
- Mixed by George Massenburg at The Complex (Los Angeles, CA)
- Production coordinator – Ivy Skoff
- Mastered by Doug Sax and Alan Yoshida at The Mastering Lab (Hollywood, CA)
- Cover painting – Neon Park
- Art direction – Janet Levinson
- Design – Neon Park and Janet Levinson
- Photography – Peter Ashworth

== Charts ==
Chart (1990)	Peak position
Canada Top Albums/CDs (RPM)	42
Swedish Albums (Sverigetopplistan)	35
Swiss Albums (Schweizer Hitparade)	37
US Billboard 200	45
