= Tony Leone =

Tony Leone may refer to:

- Tony Leone (musician)
- Tony Leone (footballer)

== See also ==
- Anthony Leone (disambiguation)
- Antonio Leone (disambiguation)
