= Anthony Leone =

Anthony Leone may refer to:

- Anthony Leone (fighter)
- Anthony Leone (filmmaker)
- Tony Leone (musician)

== See also ==
- Antonio Leone (disambiguation)
- Tony Leone (disambiguation)
