= Antonio Leone =

Antonio Leone may refer to:

- Antonio Leone (politician)
- Tony Leone (footballer)

== See also ==
- Anthony Leone (disambiguation)
- Tony Leone (disambiguation)
