= Craig Fuller =

American musician and songwriter (born 1949)

- Born: July 18, 1949 (age 77)
- Genres: Country rock, country, roots rock, blues rock, swamp rock, americana, jam band
- Occupations: Musician, songwriter
- Instruments: Vocals, guitar

Craig Lee Fuller (born July 18, 1949) is an American musician and songwriter. Fuller was the co-founder of Pure Prairie League, along with John David Call and George Powell.

Fuller wrote and sang their first hit "Amie". He departed the band in 1973 after their second album, Bustin' Out. He returned to the music business in 1976 for two LPs with American Flyer. After American Flyer dissolved, Fuller returned to record one LP with former Flyer member Eric Kaz.

In 1987 Fuller was hired by Little Feat to front the band, who had noticed a resemblance in his voice to that of their late founder and frontman, Lowell George. Fuller's first LP with the band was Let It Roll. He recorded two further albums with Little Feat before leaving the band in 1993. He made a guest appearance on their 1996 live album Live From Neon Park. He is one of several guest artists on Little Feat's 2008 album Join the Band, duetting with percussionist Sam Clayton on the Lowell George classic "Spanish Moon."

Fuller reformed Pure Prairie League in 1998. This incarnation recorded one album, All In Good Time, released in 2005.

Fuller opened for and sat in with Little Feat on New Year's Eve 2011 at the Fillmore in Silver Spring, Maryland, when the band performed their live album Waiting for Columbus in its entirety.

== Albums ==
with J. D. Blackfoot

- The Ultimate Prophecy (1970)

with Pure Prairie League

- Pure Prairie League (1972)
- Bustin' Out (1972)
- Mementos (1987)
- All In Good Time (2005)

with American Flyer

- American Flyer (1976)
- Spirit Of A Woman (1977)

with Fuller and Kaz

- Craig Fuller and Eric Kaz (1978)

with Little Feat

- Let It Roll (1988)
- Representing The Mambo (1990)
- Shake Me Up (1991)

with Doug Prescott

- The Journey & the Deep Blue Sea (2011)
