= Little Feat =

American rock band

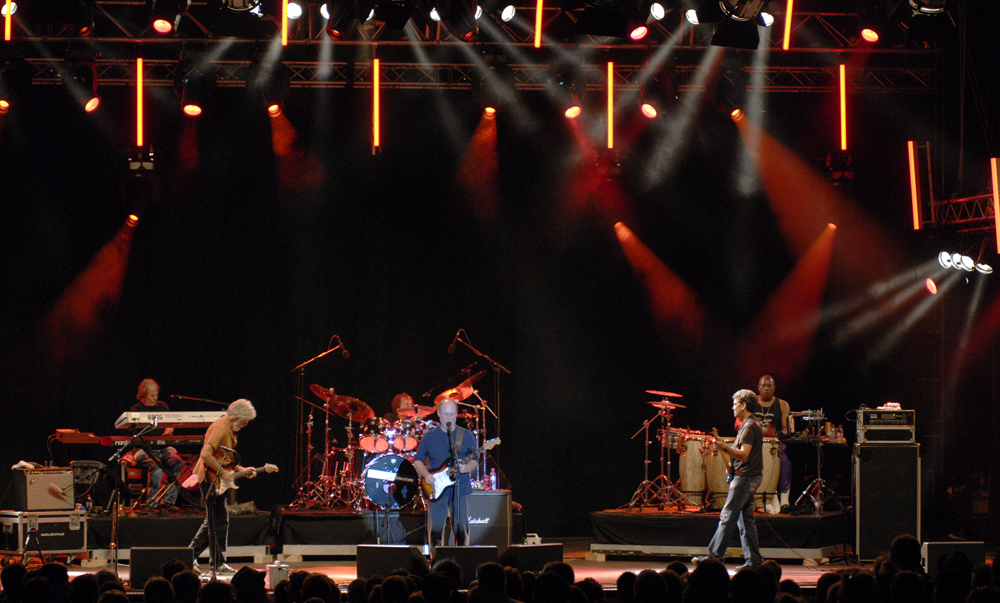
- Performing at Stockholm JazzFest '09

Background information
- Origin: Los Angeles, California, U.S.
- Genres: Southern rock; boogie rock; roots rock; blues rock; swamp rock; jam band
- Works: Discography
- Years active: 1969–1979; 1987–present
- Labels: Rhino; Warner Bros.; CMC International; Tower; Hot Tomato Imprint; Zoo Entertainment
- Spinoff of: The Mothers of Invention
- Members: Bill Payne; Sam Clayton; Kenny Gradney; Fred Tackett; Scott Sharrard; Tony Leone
- Past members: Lowell George; Richie Hayward; Roy Estrada; Paul Barrere; Craig Fuller; Shaun Murphy; Gabe Ford
- Website: Official website

Little Feat is an American rock band formed in Los Angeles in 1969 by lead vocalist and guitarist Lowell George, bassist Roy Estrada (both formerly of the Mothers of Invention), keyboardist Bill Payne, and drummer Richie Hayward. The band's classic line-up, in place by late 1972, consisted of George, Payne, Hayward, bassist Kenny Gradney, guitarist and vocalist Paul Barrere, and percussionist Sam Clayton. George disbanded the group because of creative differences shortly before his death in 1979. Surviving members re-formed Little Feat in 1987 and the band continues to perform.

== History ==
=== Formative years ===
Singer and guitarist Lowell George met keyboardist Bill Payne when George was a member of Frank Zappa's Mothers of Invention. They formed Little Feat in 1969 along with former Mothers bassist Roy Estrada, and drummer Richie Hayward from George's previous band, The Factory. Hayward had also been a member of the Fraternity of Man whose claim to fame was the inclusion of their "Don't Bogart That Joint" on the million-selling Easy Rider film soundtrack. The name of the band came from a comment made by the Mothers' drummer Jimmy Carl Black about Lowell's "little feet". The spelling of "feat" was an homage to the Beatles.

There are two stories about the genesis of Little Feat. One has it that Lowell George showed Zappa his song "Willin'," and that Zappa fired him from the Mothers of Invention, because he felt that George was too talented to merely be a member of his band and told him that he ought to go away and form his own band. The second version says that Zappa fired him because "Willin'" contains drug references ("weed, whites and wine"). Lowell George often introduced the song as the reason he was asked to leave the band. On October 18, 1975 at the Auditorium Theater in Rochester, New York while introducing the song, Lowell George commented that he was asked to leave the band for "writing a song about dope".

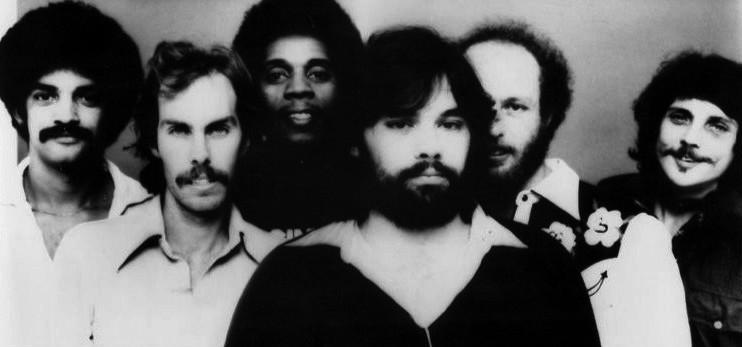
Little Feat in 1975

In any version, Zappa was instrumental in getting Lowell George and his new band a contract with Warner Bros. Records. The eponymous first album delivered to Warner Bros. was recorded mostly in August and September 1970 and was released in January 1971. When it came time to record "Willin'," Lowell George had hurt his hand in an accident with a model airplane, so Ry Cooder sat in and played the song's slide part. Lowell George's accident is referenced on the cover art of the band's 1998 album Under the Radar. "Willin'" was re-recorded with Lowell George playing slide for Little Feat's second album Sailin' Shoes, which was also the first Little Feat album to include cover art by Neon Park, who had painted the cover for the Mothers' Weasels Ripped My Flesh. Park continued to provide surrealist art for all of Little Feat's album covers until his death in 1993.

Sometime during the recording of the first two albums, the band members along with ex-Mothers of Invention drummer Jimmy Carl Black ("the Indian of the group") backed soul singer Nolan Porter on his first album, No Apologies. The first two albums received nearly universal critical acclaim, and "Willin'" became a standard, subsequently popularized by its inclusion on Linda Ronstadt's album Heart Like a Wheel.

Despite good reviews of Sailin' Shoes, lack of commercial success led to the band splitting up, with Estrada leaving to join Captain Beefheart's Magic Band, although he has given other reasons for quitting the band, such as to get away from the Los Angeles pollution and the L.A. city life.

=== Classic line-up and change of direction ===
In late 1972, Little Feat reformed, with bassist Kenny Gradney replacing Estrada. The band also added a second guitarist in Paul Barrere, who had known George since they attended Hollywood High School in California, and percussionist Sam Clayton (brother of session singer Merry Clayton and the brother-in-law of Curtis Amy, a jazz saxophonist) and as a result the band was expanded from a quartet to a sextet. Both Barrere and Clayton added vocals on many songs, although all the band members provided backing vocals in various tunes.

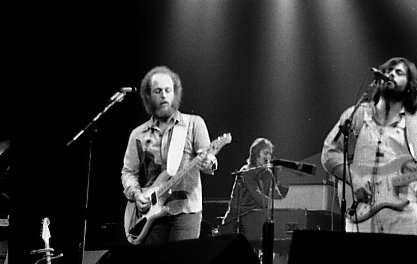
L to R: Paul Barrere and Lowell George, frontmen for Little Feat, 1972–1977 (with Bill Payne in background)

The new lineup radically altered the band's sound, leaning toward New Orleans funk. The group recorded Dixie Chicken (1973)—one of the band's most popular albums, which incorporated New Orleans musical influences and styles—as well as Feats Don't Fail Me Now (1974), which was a studio-recorded attempt to capture some of the energy of their live shows (the name of the latter album pays homage to the Fats Waller song).

In 1973, Payne, Gradney, Barrere, Clayton, and Lowell George (incorrectly credited as George Lowell) collaborated with jazz drummer Chico Hamilton on his Stax album Chico the Master, which is a strong showcase for the band's leanings toward funk and R&B. In 1973, Little Feat backed Kathy Dalton on her Amazing album on the DiscReet label produced by Warner Bros. Records. Due to disappointing sales, the band disbanded a second time in late 1973. Payne joined the Doobie Brothers and Hayward joined Ike Turner.

They reformed in 1974, releasing their fourth album Feats Don't Fail Me Now later that year. In 1974, Lowell George, along with the Meters and other session musicians, backed Robert Palmer on his Island Records debut solo release Sneakin' Sally Through the Alley which opened with George's "Sailing Shoes." The whole band chipped in on Palmer's 1975 release, Pressure Drop, which contained another George composition, "Trouble". 1976's Some People Can Do What They Like, Palmer's third opus, opened with the Bill Payne/Fran Tate composition "One Last Look", and later featured George's "Spanish Moon", although George and Gradney sat this one out. In March 1976, Little Feat served as the backing band on the first side of Akiko Yano's debut studio album Japanese Girl, released on the Philips label. The band remained based in Los Angeles due to doing session work on the side in addition to band activities.

The release of The Last Record Album in 1975 signaled another change in the Little Feat sound, with Barrere and Payne developing an interest in jazz-rock. Prior to the recording of The Last Record Album, drummer Richie Hayward had a motorcycle accident and the liner to the LP release of The Last Record Album was decorated with copies of his many hospital bills. Also present was evidence of a late change to the running order of tracks: the lyrics for Barrere's song "Hi Roller" were printed on the sleeve, but scored out, and the words "maybe next time" scrawled over them. Sure enough, "Hi Roller" was the first track on the subsequent album Time Loves a Hero.

Lowell George continued to produce the albums, but his songwriting contribution diminished as the group moved into jazz fusion, a style in which he had little interest. In August 1977, Little Feat recorded a live album from gigs at the Rainbow Theatre in London and Lisner Auditorium in Washington, D.C. Waiting for Columbus is considered by many rock music critics to be one of the best live albums of all time, despite the fact that significant portions of George's vocals and slide work were over-dubbed later in the studio. It was released in 1978, by which time it had become apparent that George's interest in the band was waning, as was his health.

=== Death of George and band breakup ===
Little Feat began working on a new album, Down on the Farm, before disbanding in 1979. In an interview with Bill Flanagan (for the book Written in My Soul) conducted eleven days before his death, Lowell George made it clear that he felt the demise of Little Feat was due to his having allowed the band to be run democratically, with the result that Payne and, to a lesser extent, Barrere, had a presence as songwriters and in production which was disproportionate to their abilities. Lowell George was particularly scathing about Payne's attempts at jazz/fusion, citing an instance when Payne jammed with Weather Report on a TV show and dropped "into one of his 'Day at the Dog Races'. I just got out of there as fast as I could. It was embarrassing". In the same interview, George said that he planned to reunite Little Feat without Payne and Barrere.

At this time Warner Bros. released George's only solo album, Thanks, I'll Eat It Here, for which he had signed a contract in 1975. The album was mostly a collection of cover versions that George had been working on as a side project for several years, and in his biography Rock And Roll Doctor, Mark Brend says that George had hinted he only signed the solo contract to obtain funds to finance Little Feat (and Bill Flanagan states in Written in My Soul that George "didn't want his audience to assume a collection of other people's material marked the direction of Lowell George's solo career").

While touring in support of his solo album in June 1979, at the age of 34, George collapsed and died in his hotel room in Arlington, Virginia. An autopsy determined the cause of death was a heart attack.

The surviving members finished and released Down on the Farm in late 1979. A double compilation album of rare studio outtakes and live recordings, Hoy-Hoy!, was released in 1981. The album is an overview of the history and sound of Little Feat and includes a cover of the Hank Williams song "Lonesome Whistle". In 1981 and 1982, Barrere, Clayton, Gradney and Hayward performed several shows as "Barrere, Clayton, Gradney and Hayward" along with singer/guitarist Phil Brown.

Barrere then released two solo albums, 1983's On My Own Two Feet (Mirage) and 1984's Real Lies (Atlantic). Richie Hayward was the drummer on Robert Plant's 1985 funk and new wave flavoured Shaken 'n' Stirred (Es Paranza). Payne has always been a popular and busy session musician, as well as a songwriter, and during the band's first hiatus performed on a variety of albums by many famous musicians including J. J. Cale, the Doobie Brothers, Emmylou Harris, Pink Floyd, Bob Seger, Linda Ronstadt, Jackson Browne, James Taylor, Bonnie Raitt, and Stevie Nicks. He was a guest performer on Raitt's Sweet Forgiveness in 1977, which featured his composition "Takin' My Time."

=== Fuller years (1987–1993) ===
In 1986, Hayward, Barrere and Payne were invited to play on Blue Slipper, the 1987 debut album by Helen Watson. They subsequently appeared on her second album The Weather Inside. The surviving former members of Little Feat then reformed in 1987 when Barrere, Clayton, Gradney, Hayward and Payne added songwriter/vocalist/guitarist Craig Fuller, formerly from the band Pure Prairie League, and Fred Tackett on guitar, mandolin and trumpet. The band admired Fuller's previous work and were impressed when he toured with them in 1978 as part of the Fuller/Kaz band. They didn't require an audition, having played with him on tour, and thus, the new Little Feat lineup was formed. The initial release by the new lineup, Let It Roll, was a tremendous success and Fuller's presence proved to be a major factor. His strong vocals and songwriting abilities were showcased, co-writing 8 of the 10 songs and handling a large share of lead vocals. The first single, "Hate to Lose Your Lovin'", earned the band their first No. 1 hit on the Mainstream Rock Tracks chart. AllMusic critic Stephen Erlewine said, "What's surprising about Let It Roll is not just that it works, but that it works smashingly." The LP garnered Feat a certified gold record status on February 14, 1989. On the heels of this success, previous Feat releases experienced a surge in sales. The 1978 live release Waiting for Columbus went platinum in November 1989. Dixie Chicken, originally released on January 25, 1973, went gold the same month. The band received more exposure than ever, including an appearance on Saturday Night Live. Concerts were booked nationally, and Little Feat played enthusiastic, sold-out shows.

The next album, Representing the Mambo, released in 1990, proved to be the group's last album for Warner Bros., who were uncomfortable with the album's jazzier leanings. The third and final album by the lineup, Shake Me Up (1991), was released on Morgan Creek, as was the soundtrack of the 1992 film White Sands which contained one song by Little Feat called Quicksand and Lies, but this label folded soon afterwards and Little Feat moved from one label to another until the establishment of Hot Tomato Records in 2002. In the fall of 1991, Clayton was forced to miss several tour dates due to ill health.

Fuller departed in 1993, saying that touring required too much time away from his family. He later joined a re-formed Pure Prairie League, who in 2005 released the critically acclaimed album, All in Good Time, which heavily featured his songwriting, singing, and acoustic guitar. Until leaving PPL again in 2011, he performed about 40 shows yearly with them, as well as occasional shows with Little Feat in addition to performing solo shows.

=== Murphy years (1993–2009) ===
Fuller was replaced by Shaun Murphy in September 1993. Murphy had sung on all of the recent Little Feat albums and throughout 1993 she had toured as part of Bob Seger's band with Fred Tackett and Bill Payne. Murphy's first album with the group was Ain't Had Enough Fun. As well as having material specifically written for her, fans attracted to her hard-edged powerhouse voice, further albums Under the Radar and Chinese Work Songs saw Murphy become an integral part of the group sharing lead vocals and writing with Payne and Barrere. Her rendition of Bob Dylan's "It Takes a Lot to Laugh" was first recorded in studio on Chinese Work Songs and became a favorite in live appearances with Murphy.

In 2008, the group released Join the Band, an album featuring collaborations with Jimmy Buffett, Dave Matthews, Emmylou Harris, Bob Seger, Béla Fleck, Brooks & Dunn, Chris Robinson, Vince Gill, Mike Gordon, and Inara George. After recording five studio albums and performing over 1,400 concerts with the band, Murphy was dismissed in 2009, and the group pared down to a six-piece collective entity.

=== Hayward illness and death ===
In August 2009, Richie Hayward announced that he had recently been diagnosed with a severe liver disease and would be unable to work indefinitely. A benefit concert was organized and a website created where fans unable to attend could donate toward his treatment costs. Little Feat announced that their drum technician Gabe Ford would take his place.

Hayward married and was living on Vancouver Island, British Columbia with his liver cancer in remission as he awaited a transplant. On July 11, 2010, Little Feat played at the Vancouver Island Music Festival and Hayward was slated to play just a couple of tunes, but once he sat behind his kit, he finished out the night. Hayward had intended to return to the band in the event of recovery, but he died on August 12, 2010, from pneumonia and complications from lung disease.

=== 2012 and beyond ===
In June 2012, Little Feat released their first album of new material in nine years, Rooster Rag. In 2014, the band Leftover Salmon announced that Bill Payne had joined with them as a permanent member. He left in 2015 to take up a permanent post in The Doobie Brothers' touring band: this restricted his ability to perform longer tours with Little Feat. After this, the full band would perform around 10 dates per year, while Barrere, Tackett, Gradney and Ford would sometimes tour playing Little Feat material as a four-piece called Funky Feat.

In 1994, Paul Barrere had been diagnosed with hepatitis C and, in 2013, took a leave of absence from touring with Little Feat to combat the disease, and to remain close to his health providers. He later performed a few one-off gigs with Fred Tackett as an acoustic duo and recorded collaborations with longtime friend Roger Cole. In August 2015, it was announced that he was suffering from liver cancer. In 2017, the band was joined for some shows by the Midnight Ramble Horns (Steve Bernstein, Jay Collins, and Erik Lawrence) who then augmented the band for the 50th Anniversary tour of 2018. They continue to often join the band on selected dates. The band then toured more sporadically during the next four years.

Paul Barrere died on October 26, 2019. Scott Sharrard, who had filled in for Barrere during Little Feat's 50th Anniversary tour, was later brought on board as a full-time band member.

On September 16, 2020, the band released a video rerecording of the 1975 Lowell George song "Long Distance Love". The video introduced a new band lineup with Tony Leone, known for his work with Levon Helm and Phil Lesh, joining on drums in place of Gabe Ford. Levon Helm's daughter Amy guested on backing vocals - she and Leone had previously played together in Ollabelle. A new song, the first in eight years, "When All Boats Rise", was released in late October 2020.

The album Sam's Place, an album of blues standards, was released in May 2024, with percussionist Sam Clayton providing lead vocals on every song. The opening track, "Milkman", was co-written by Clayton, Sharrard and Tackett, with lyrics provided by Clayton's wife Joni.

In May 2025, the band released their first album of new material in 13 years, titled Strike Up the Band. A track from the album, "Too High to Cut My Hair", written by Sharrard and Tackett and sung by Sharrard, was released as a single, along with a humorous video featuring group members at a hairdressing salon. The Last Record Album (Deluxe Edition) was released on 24 October 2025 as a 50th anniversary expanded 4-CD box set of their classic 1975 album with unreleased material.

== Legacy ==
Guitarist Jimmy Page said that Little Feat was his favorite American band in a 1975 Rolling Stone interview.

Little Feat's songs "Sailin' Shoes" and "Fat Man in the Bathtub" were featured prominently in the 2010 Edward Norton film Leaves of Grass.

In 2018, at Peach Fest at Montage Mountain in Scranton, Pennsylvania, the remaining members of Little Feat joined forces with moe., the Turkuaz Horns and the Ramble Band Horns to recreate and pay homage to the band's classic live album Waiting For Columbus.

== Musical style ==
Little Feat's musical style is marked by an eclectic fusion of genres, incorporating elements of rock, blues, jazz, country, and funk. Early albums like Sailin' Shoes introduced a blend of country rock with folk influences, while Dixie Chicken showcased a distinctive New Orleans-inspired funk sound that became a hallmark of their style. Their music is also known for its complex rhythms and instrumental improvisations, influenced by bandleader Lowell George's bottleneck guitar work, a defining aspect of their early recordings.

Critics often compare their fan base to that of the Grateful Dead due to their devoted following and the band's turbulent lineup changes. Rolling Stone has described them as a “cult band” with a sound which drew on the musical traditions of cities including New Orleans and Memphis, Tennessee but with an idiosyncratic twist, blending Southern and swamp rock elements into a “zany South-West synthesis.” By the late 1970s, they began incorporating jazz-rock fusion, evident in tracks like Day at the Dog Races, reflecting a shift in their sound toward jazz influences.

Their live performances are celebrated for their jam band qualities, often characterized by extended instrumental sections that capture the improvisational spirit of jazz while retaining a Southern rock foundation. Glide magazine noted that Dixie Chicken and its surreal cover art became iconic for the band, underscoring their fusion of music and visual artistry and cementing their status as a lasting influence in American rock music.

== Personnel ==
=== Members ===
- Bill Payne – keyboards, vocals (1969–1979, 1987–present)
- Sam Clayton – congas, vocals, percussion (1972–1979, 1987–present)
- Kenny Gradney – bass, occasional backing vocals (1972–1979, 1987–present)
- Fred Tackett – guitar, mandolin, trumpet, vocals (1987–present)
- Scott Sharrard – guitar, vocals (2019–present)
- Tony Leone – drums, vocals (2020–present)

Little Feat at the Goodyear Theater, 2026

=== Horn section ===
- Jay Collins – saxophone (2017–present)
- Steve Bernstein – trumpet (2017–present)
- Erik Lawrence – saxophone (2017–present)

=== Past members ===
- Lowell George – vocals, guitar, harmonica (1969–1979; died 1979)
- Richie Hayward – drums, backing vocals (1969–1979, 1987–2010; died 2010)
- Roy Estrada – bass, backing vocals (1969–1972; died 2025)
- Paul Barrere – guitar, vocals (1972–1979, 1987–2019; died 2019)
- Craig Fuller – vocals, additional guitar (1987–1993)
- Shaun Murphy – vocals, tambourine (1993–2009)
- Gabe Ford – drums, backing vocals (2010–2020; touring 2009–2010)

==== Lineups ====
1969 – 1972	1972 – 1979	1987 – 1993	1993 – January 2009
Roy Estrada – bass, backing vocals; Lowell George – vocals, guitars, harmonica; Richie Hayward – drums, percussion, backing vocals; Bill Payne – keyboards, vocals	Lowell George – vocals, guitar, harmonica; Richie Hayward – drums, backing vocals; Bill Payne – keyboards, vocals; Paul Barrere – guitar, vocals; Sam Clayton – congas, vocals, percussion; Kenny Gradney – bass	Richie Hayward – drums, backing vocals; Bill Payne – keyboards, vocals; Paul Barrere – guitar, vocals, slide guitar; Sam Clayton – congas, vocals, percussion; Kenny Gradney – bass; Craig Fuller – vocals, additional guitar; Fred Tackett – guitar, mandolin, trumpet	Richie Hayward – drums, vocals; Bill Payne – keyboards, vocals; Paul Barrere – guitar, vocals, slide guitar; Sam Clayton – congas, vocals, percussion; Kenny Gradney – bass; Fred Tackett – guitar, mandolin, trumpet, vocals; Shaun Murphy – vocals, tambourine
January – August 2009	August 2009 – October 2019	October 2019 – September 2020	September 2020 – present
Richie Hayward – drums, backing vocals; Bill Payne – keyboards, vocals; Paul Barrere – guitar, vocals, slide guitar; Sam Clayton – congas, vocals, percussion; Kenny Gradney – bass; Fred Tackett – guitar, mandolin, trumpet, vocals	Bill Payne – keyboards, vocals; Paul Barrere – guitar, vocals, slide guitar; Sam Clayton – congas, vocals, percussion; Kenny Gradney – bass; Fred Tackett – guitar, mandolin, trumpet, vocals; Gabe Ford – drums, backing vocals	Bill Payne – keyboards, vocals; Sam Clayton – congas, vocals, percussion; Kenny Gradney – bass; Fred Tackett – guitar, mandolin, trumpet, vocals; Gabe Ford – drums, backing vocals; Scott Sharrard – guitar, vocals	Bill Payne – keyboards, vocals; Sam Clayton – congas, vocals, percussion; Kenny Gradney – bass, backing vocals; Fred Tackett – guitar, mandolin, trumpet, vocals; Scott Sharrard – guitar, vocals; Tony Leone – drums, vocals

== Discography ==
- Little Feat (1971)
- Sailin' Shoes (1972)
- Dixie Chicken (1973)
- Feats Don't Fail Me Now (1974)
- The Last Record Album (1975)
- Time Loves a Hero (1977)
- Waiting for Columbus (1978)
- Down on the Farm (1979)
- Let It Roll (1988)
- Representing the Mambo (1990)
- Shake Me Up (1991)
- Ain't Had Enough Fun (1995)
- Live from Neon Park (1996)
- Under the Radar (1998)
- Extended Versions (2000)
- Chinese Work Songs (2000)
- Raw Tomatos Volume One (2002)
- Ripe Tomatos Volume One (2002)
- Live at the Rams Head (2002)
- Down upon the Suwannee River (2003)
- Kickin' It at the Barn (2003)
- Highwire Act Live in St. Louis 2003 (2004)
- Barnstormin' Live Volume One (2005)
- Barnstormin' Live Volume Two (2005)
- Rocky Mountain Jam (2007)
- Join the Band (2008)
- Rams Head Revisited (2011)
- Rooster Rag (2012)
- Sam's Place (2024)
- Strike Up the Band (2025)

== Annual band excursion to Jamaica ==
Since 2003 Little Feat has organised an annual fans' trip to Jamaica, where the full band plays several shows, often with guests, and various members perform solo and duo sets.

Year	Dates	Solo/Duo shows
1st Annual Featfan Excursion	Two band shows: February 1, 2003 (with Piero Mariani); February 2, 2003 (with Mariani)	Paul Barrere and Fred Tackett (January 31, 2003); Kenny Gradney (February 2, 2003); Fred Tackett with Miles Tackett and Dominic Genova (February 2, 2003)
2nd Annual Featfan Excursion	Two band shows: January 30, 2004 (with Sam Bush); January 31, 2004 (with Sam Bush)	Barrere and Fred Tackett (January 29, 2004); Gradney with Mariani (January 31, 2004); Richie Hayward (January 31, 2004); Bill Payne with Shaun Murphy and Piero Mariani (January 31, 2004)
3rd Annual Featfan Excursion	Two band shows: January 28, 2005 (with Coco Montoya, Stephen Bruton, Miles Tackett, and Mariani); January 29, 2005 (with Montoya, Bruton, Miles Tackett, and Mariani)	Paul Barrere and Fred Tackett (January 27, 2005); Hayward (January 29, 2005); Payne with Murphy, Montoya, Bruton, Mariani, and the Cajun Queens (January 29, 2005)
4th Annual Featfan Excursion	Five band shows: January 28, 2006 (with Inara George, Mariani, Sam Bush, and Vince Herman); January 29, 2006 (with Inara George, Mariani, Sam Bush, and Herman); February 1, 2006 (with Mariani, Ron Holloway, and Montoya); February 3, 2006 (with Mariani, Holloway, and Montoya); February 4, 2006 (with Montoya)	Barrere and Fred Tackett (January 27, 2006); Payne with Murphy, Fred Tackett, Barrere, and Mariani (January 29, 2006); Payne with Murphy, Fred Tackett, Barrere, Holloway, and Mariani (February 2, 2006)
5th Annual Featfan Excursion	Four band shows: January 28, 2007 (with Craig Fuller and Herman); January 29, 2007 (with Fuller, Herman, Howie Golub, Michael B. Favreau, and Larry Lister); February 2, 2007 (with Fuller and Hubert Sumlin); February 3, 2007 (with Fuller and Sumlin)	Fred Tackett, Barrere, Fuller, and Herman (January 27, 2007); Fuller (January 29, 2007); Barrere and Fred Tackett (February 1, 2007); Fred Tackett (February 3, 2007)
6th Annual Featfan Excursion	Two band shows: February 2, 2008 (with Herman); February 4, 2008 (with Herman)	Barrere and Fred Tackett (February 1, 2008)
7th Annual Featfan Excursion	Two band shows: January 24, 2009 (with Mariani and Fuller); January 26, 2009 (with Mariani and Fuller)	Fuller, Sam Clayton, and Fred Tackett (January 25, 2009)
8th Annual Featfan Excursion	Three band shows: March 5, 2010 (with Fuller); March 6, 2010 (with Fuller); March 7, 2010 (with Fuller)	
9th Annual Featfan Excursion	Three band shows: March 4, 2011 (with Fuller and Holloway); March 5, 2011 (with Fuller and Holloway); March 6, 2011 (with Fuller and Holloway)	Bill Payne, Gabe Ford, and Holloway (March 6, 2010)
10th Annual Featfan Excursion	Four band shows: January 18, 2012; January 19, 2012; January 20, 2012; January 21, 2012	
