= Tony Leone (musician) =

American musician (born 1969)

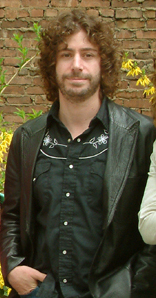
- Leone with Ollabelle in 2005

Background information
- Birth name: Anthony Leone
- Born: July 18, 1969 (age 56); New Britain, Connecticut, U.S.
- Genres: Folk rock; folk; rock; americana; country
- Occupation: Musician
- Instruments: Drums; mandolin
- Years active: 1994–present
- Member of: Ollabelle; Little Feat
- Formerly of: Phil Lesh and Friends; Chris Robinson Brotherhood
- Website: tonyleonemusic.com

Anthony Leone (born July 18, 1969) is an American musician. He is best known for his membership in the bands Ollabelle and the Chris Robinson Brotherhood. He has also worked with a variety of musicians including Levon Helm of The Band and Phil Lesh of the Grateful Dead. In September 2020 he was announced as a new member of Little Feat.

== Life and career ==
Leone was born on July 18, 1969, in New Britain, Connecticut. He grew up in Newington, Connecticut and began performing in bands at the age of 11, initially covering artists such as Jimi Hendrix and Led Zeppelin. During his adolescence he developed an interest in jazz through musicians such as Miles Davis, John Coltrane and Wayne Shorter. He studied music at The Hartt School, the performing arts conservatory of the University of Hartford, under jazz saxophonist Jackie McLean. It was during this time that Leone decided to pursue drums as his primary musical instrument. During his time at The Hartt School, Jackie McLean introduced him to jazz drumming great Art Taylor. Leone then took private lessons with Taylor on a few different occasions.

Following the completion of his studies, Leone spent a year living in New York City where he played small jazz clubs for a living. He was given the offer to travel to Berlin, Germany to play drums with a theater review. He moved back to Hartford in 1994 and performed in bands led by trombonist Steve Davis. It was during this time that he began going to Lexington, Massachusetts weekly for lessons with the great drum teacher, Alan Dawson. He studied with Dawson over the course of about nine months. He moved back to New York City in 1998 and performed for the next four years with a variety of musicians. He also began teaching at The Hartt School as an adjunct professor of drum set studies during this time.

In 2002 he co-founded American roots band Ollabelle with Amy Helm, daughter of Levon Helm. Shortly after forming Ollabelle, Leone began performing sporadically with the Levon Helm Band. He would play drums at some concerts when Helm went to the front of the stage to play mandolin.

In January 2015 he joined the Chris Robinson Brotherhood a blues rock band led by former Black Crowes singer Chris Robinson, replacing their original drummer George Sluppick. He also performs sporadically with different lineups of Phil Lesh and Friends, a band led by bassist Phil Lesh of the Grateful Dead.

Other artists that Leone has recorded and performed with include Anders Osborne, Shooter Jennings, Rickie Lee Jones, Donald Fagen, Phoebe Snow, Garth Hudson, David Bromberg, Keb' Mo', Chip Taylor, Jim White, Marshall Crenshaw, Jimmy Vivino, Steve Earle, Allison Moorer, Bruce Springsteen and The Allman Brothers Band.
