= Bill Wray (musician) =

American musician, composer and producer

Bill Wray (born Shreveport, Louisiana) is an American musician, composer and producer. His performing career spanned the mid-1970s through the early 1980s. Since then, he has written and produced for a variety of artists from glam metal to cajun. He is the brother of fellow musician/composer Jim Wray.

== Music career ==
Bill Wray made an appearance on the Billboard Hot 100 with the song "Pinball, That's All" in 1979, peaking at No. 96.

Bill Wray has written the songs "Fool for Your Love" and "So Close" for Diana Ross. Wray and his brother Jim wrote most of the hits ("One in a Million", "Surrender") on Trixter's debut album.

Wray was the producer of EFX at MGM Grand Casino, at the time the most expensive and largest-scaled theater installation in the world. Stars rotated through every two years were Michael Crawford, David Cassidy, Tommy Tune and Rick Springfield. The last three were during Wray's tenure.

Bill Wray used to play at the old Dynasty Club and Common Ground in Baton Rouge, Louisiana. There was also the Bill Wray Band which included Greg Worley. As an artist, Wray opened for such artists as Foreigner, Toto, Rick Springfield, The Kinks, BTO, Peter Frampton and Joe Cocker.

Wray produced Driven2Rock at the MGM Grand which gave custom inlaid Melancon Guitars to stars such as Dale Earnhardt Jr., Britney Spears and Michael Waltrip on March 5 and 6th 2004.

== Credits ==
=== Composed songs for ===
- Lisa Hartman
- Little Feat
- God Street Wine
- EFX (show)
- Flame
- Diana Ross
- Loverboy
- Zachary Richard
- Trixter
- Emerson, Lake & Palmer
- Ace Frehley - Courtesy AMG

=== Songs composed by (officially credited) ===
- Song - Artist
- 'Till My Heart Stops Beating - Lisa Hartman
- Angeline - God Street Wine
- Apotheosis (Final Dance) - 1999 Las Vegas Cast EFX
- Back to the Future - Diana Ross
- Better Day - Eric Martin
- Big Bang Theory - Little Feat
- Borderline Blues - Little Feat
- Bullet in the Chamber - Loverboy
- Burning - Zachary Richard
- Cadillac Hotel - Little Feat
- Cajun Rage - Little Feat
- Change - Emerson, Lake & Palmer
- Dancing at Double d's - Zachary Richard
- Destination Heartbreak - Loverboy
- Down in Congo Square - Zachary Richard
- Drivin' Blind - Little Feat
- Eclipse - 1999 Las Vegas Cast EFX
- EFX (Bring On The Dream) - 1999 Las Vegas Cast EFX
- Friday Night - Loverboy
- Gone Too Soon - Emerson, Lake & Palmer
- Heart of Steel - Trixter
- How Many Rivers? - Lisa Hartman
- In Dreams - 1999 Las Vegas Cast EFX
- Intergalactic Circus of Wonders - 1996 and 1999 Las Vegas Cast EFX
- It's A Wonderful Life - Diana Ross
- Lead a Double Life - Loverboy
- Let it Shine, Pts 1 & 2 - 1996 & 1999 Las Vegas Cast EFX
- No Mercy - 1990 Lionheart soundtrack
- One in a Million - Trixter
- Only Young Once - Trixter
- Play Rough - Trixter
- Prologue - 1999 Las Vegas Cast EFX
- Ride the Whip - 1999 Las Vegas Cast EFX
- Rock & Roll Everynight - Little Feat
- Roll Me - Zachary Richard
- Shockwaves - Diana Ross
- So Close - Diana Ross
- Song and Dance Man - 1999 Las Vegas Cast EFX
- Steal the Thunder - Loverboy
- Surrender - Trixter
- Tempt Me (If You Want To) - Navy SEALs Soundtrack / Lisa Hartman
- Tender Kiss - Lisa Hartman
- The Curtain Call - 1999 Las Vegas Cast EFX
- The Wedge - 1999 Las Vegas Cast EFX
- Thin Line - Emerson, Lake & Palmer
- This Could Be the Night - Loverboy
- Too Much Too Soon - Loverboy
- Trouble Walkin' - Ace Frehley
- What a Night - 1999 Las Vegas Cast EFX
- What She Don't Know - 1991 Flame
- When You Believe (Lullaby) - 1999 Las Vegas Cast EFX
- When You Dream - Diana Ross
- Where Did We Go Wrong - Diana Ross
- You'll Never See My Cryin' - Trixter
- Zydeco Jump - Zachary Richard

=== Own albums ===
- Bill Wray (1976 MCA/legend 2188 Leon Medica performs on album)ASIN: B000RZQKM0
- Seize the Moment (1983 Liberty LT-51140 Produced by John Ryan for Chicago Kid Productions)
- Bill Wray and His Show Band Royale (songs Ooo Baby, Baby and Morning Dew, Warner Brothers-Seven Arts #7317, other artists: Jim Chiek)
- Fire and Ice (1981 Liberty LT-1098)
- Louisiana Rain (Liberty)
- Takin My Time (MCA 40611)
- Pinball, That's All - Tilt (film) soundtrack. Made Billboard top 100 (hit 96 for two weeks starting 5/19/1979 ABC 12449) Other songs for film: My Music, Where Were You, Don't Stop the Music, Rock and Roll Rodeo, Melody Man, Friends, Mercedes Morning, Koala Shuffle.
- Unknown Album 1979 - Don't Stop the Music, Friends, Long Road to Texas, Melody Man, My Music, Pinball That's All, Rock N Roll Rodeo, Where Were You
- Goin' Down/(You're A) Heartbreaker (1983 Liberty 1491 or SP225) - single
- River City (1976 7" single MCA 40576
- Takin' My Time/Same (1976 single MCA 40611)
- Louisiana Rain (???? Liberty 1428) - single

=== Other credits ===
- Year - Album - Artist - Credit
- 1979 - Tilt (film) IMDB - Original Soundtrack - Vocals, Composition, Music Arranger, pinball machine music AMG ABC 1114
- 1983 - Private School (aka Private School for Girls) - Bandleader - actor and performer on soundtrack East World (WPT-90)
- 1983 - Break Out - The Pointer Sisters - uncredited project work with producer Richard Perry
- 1984 - 1100 Bel Air Place - Julio Iglesias - uncredited project work with producer Richard Perry
- 1985 - Private Resort - Original Soundtrack - composer "Ba Ba Ben", "Caribbean Heat", "Postcards", "Summer Eve"
- 1990 - Navy Seals - Original Soundtrack - Producer
- 1990 - Trixter - Trixter - Producer
- 1990 - Lionheart (film) - Original Soundtrack - "No Mercy" performer
- 1991 - Don't Tell Mom The Babysitter's Dead
- 1992 - Snake Bite Love - Zachary Richard - Background vocals
- 1994 - In the Hot Seat - Emerson, Lake & Palmer - Background vocals
- 1995 - Ain't Had Enough Fun - Little Feat - Producer
- 1996 - Live From Neon Park - Little Feat - Producer
- 1996 - Pompatus of Love - Original Soundtrack - Producer
- 1997 - From The Beginning: Retrospective - Greg Lake - Background vocals
- 1997 - God Street Wine - God Street Wine - Arranger, Sound Effects, Producer, Mixing
- 1998 - Rock and Roll Doctor: Lowell George Tribute - Various Artists - Producer
- 1998 - Somewhere in the Middle - Eric Martin (singer) - Producer, Mixing
- 1999 - Arrhythmia - Jack Mack and the Heart Attack - Producer
- 2000 - Hotcakes and Outtakes: 30 Years of Little Feat - Little Feat - Producer, Assistant Engineer, Production Consultant
- 2000 - Silver Jubilee: Best of Zachary Richard 1973-1998 - Zachary Richard - Producer
- 2002 - Sidekick - Everyone's Hero - Producer
- 2004 - Destroy All Monsters - Eric Martin (singer) - Producer
- 2006 - Best of Little Feat - Little Feat - Producer, Original Recording Producer
