= Sam Clayton =

American percussionist (born 1946)

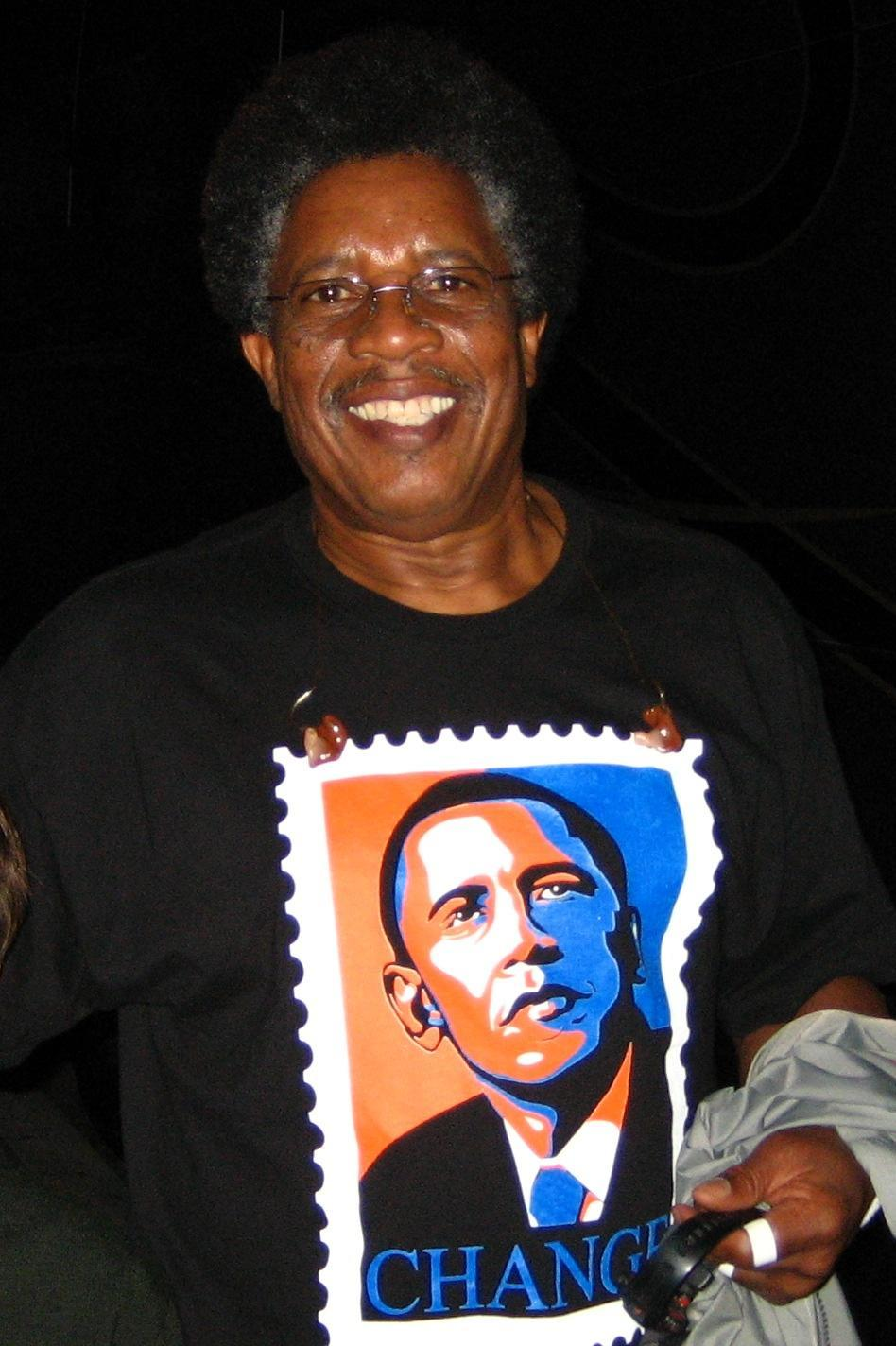
- Clayton outside the 9:30 Club, Washington, DC, in 2008

Background information
- Born: 30 March 1946 (age 80)
- Genres: Blues, R&B, gospel music, roots rock, blues rock, swamp rock, jam band
- Occupations: Musician songwriter record producer
- Instruments: Vocals, percussion
- Member of: Little Feat
- Website: Little Feat.com

Sam Clayton (born September 16, 1946) is an American singer and percussionist, primarily focusing on drums, conga and djembe throughout his musical career. He is best known as a supporting vocalist and percussionist with the American rock band Little Feat since 1972.

== History ==
As a young man, he was influenced by R&B and gospel music. He is the brother of singer Merry Clayton and the brother-in-law of jazz flautist and saxophonist Curtis Amy.

After seeing Lester Horton and the modern dancers "Zapata", he was enthralled by the conga player. However, it was not until a chance opportunity to sit in with a house band for a song on the congas at a farewell dinner, just as he was laid off from his employment in electro-mechanical engineering drafting, that Clayton was offered the chance to join a band and play. Clayton played for a short time with Little Richard, and says he was inspired by "what Mongo Santamaría was doing with Cal Tjader".

== Little Feat ==
Clayton was introduced to Little Feat, an eclectic band drenched in Southern rhythms, funk, jazz, and rock and roll, by his friend Kenny Gradney with whom he had played behind Delaney & Bonnie, and who was to replace original bassist Roy Estrada. Gradney recommended Clayton to the band as he knew both men needed work following Delaney & Bonnie's split up following their divorce; guitarist Paul Barrere also joined the line-up, thus expanding the band to a sextet.

Sam made his debut with Little Feat on their third album Dixie Chicken in 1973. He also played congas on Bonnie Raitt's 1977 song, "Sweet Forgiveness", on her album of the same name. As time went on, his vocal talents as well as his percussion came to the fore, which gave the band a funkier sound. Although he rarely sang lead vocals, his scat-influenced bass vocals were strongly in evidence on tracks like "Rock 'n' Roll Doctor" from Feats Don't Fail Me Now. His first lead vocal with the group was "Feel The Groove" from Down on the Farm in 1979, but the band broke up shortly afterwards and the subsequent death of founder Lowell George meant they did not reform until 1987.

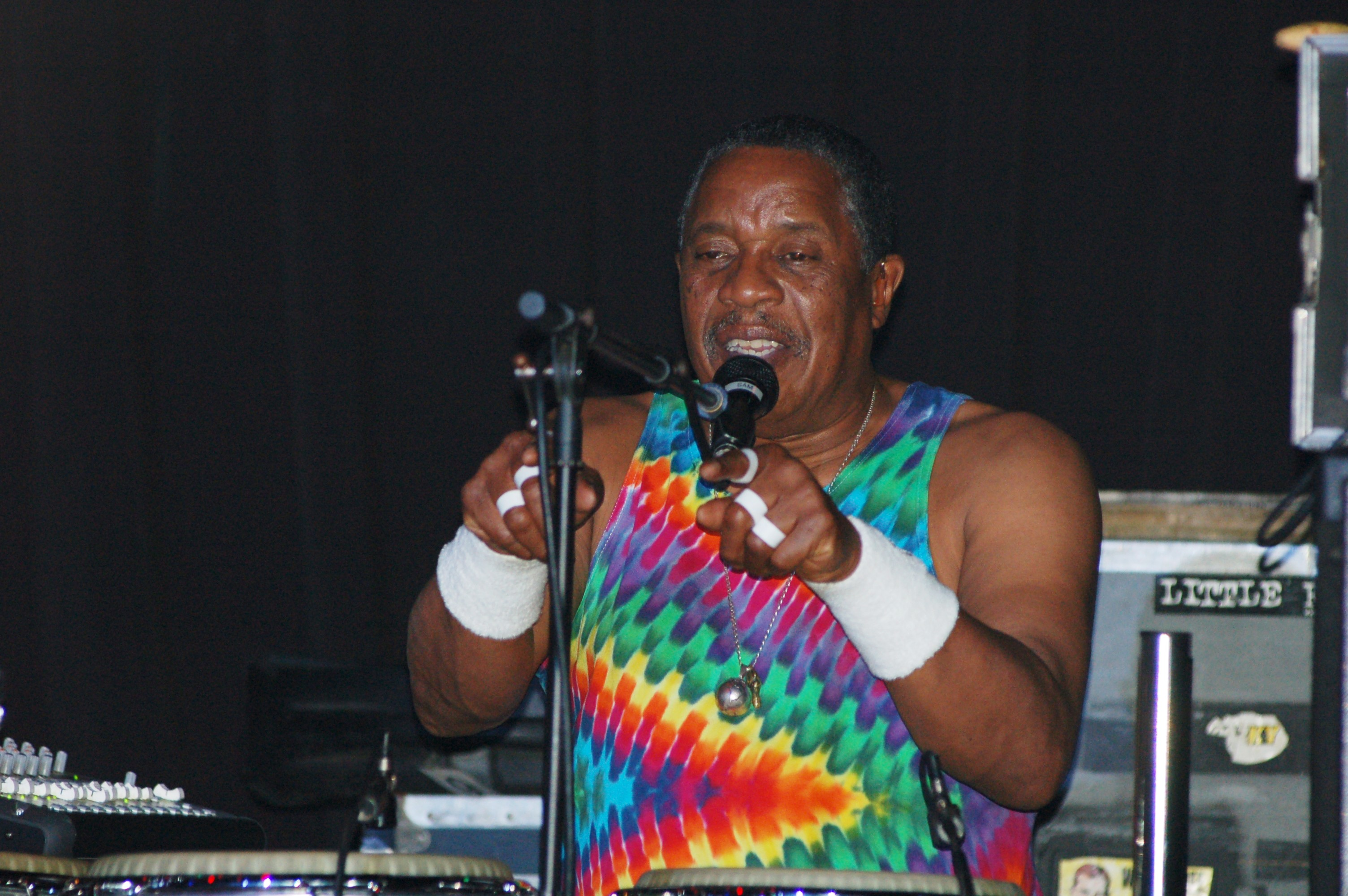
Clayton with Little Feat in June 2008

When Little Feat re-grouped, Sam's voice became even more evident on songs like "The Ingenue" (from Representing the Mambo) and "Romance Without Finance" and "That's A Pretty Good Love" (from Ain't Had Enough Fun). He also sang the Lowell George classic "Spanish Moon" at Little Feat's live shows for many years. Little Feat released their album Sam's Place in 2024. It is their first album to feature Clayton on lead vocals on every song. All songs are covers of blues standards except the opening track "Milkman", credited to Clayton and the group's guitarists Fred Tackett and Scott Sharrard.

== Session work ==
Like other members of Little Feat, Clayton is also a respected session musician and has played with Duane Allman, Jimmy Barnes, Jimmy Buffett, Valerie Carter, Freddie King, Robert Palmer, Bonnie Raitt, Bob Seger and Travis Tritt among others.

Clayton was a member of Jimmy Buffett's Coral Reefer Band for the tours from 1982 to 1988.
