= Richie Hayward =

American musician (1946–2010)

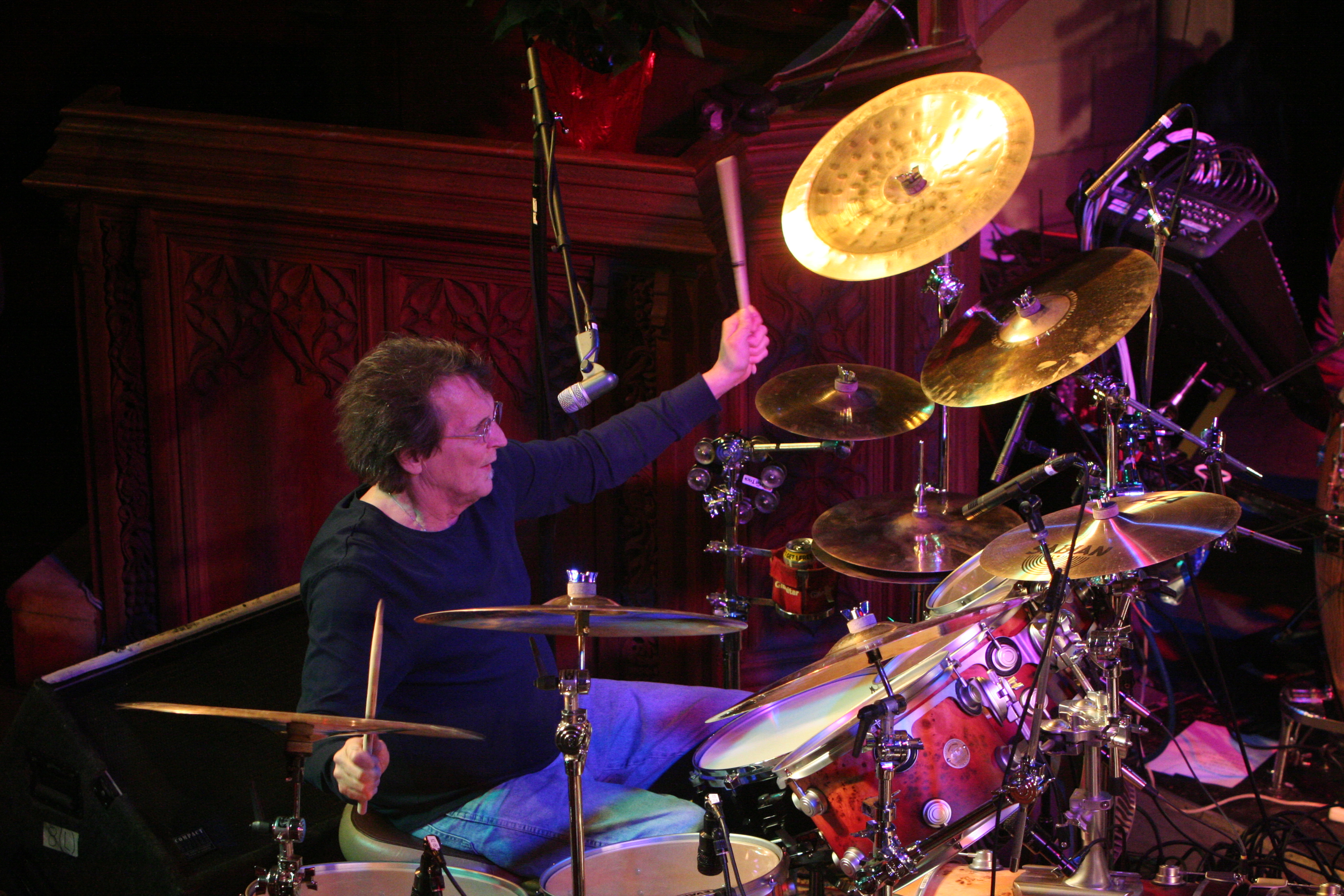
- Hayward playing with Little Feat in 2008

Background information
- Born: Richard Hayward; February 6, 1946; Clear Lake, Iowa, United States
- Died: August 12, 2010 (aged 64) Victoria, British Columbia, Canada
- Genres: Rock, roots rock, blues rock, swamp rock, jam band, Cajun music, Americana
- Occupations: Musician, songwriter
- Instruments: Drums, percussion, vocals
- Years active: 1960s–2010
- Labels: Warner Bros, Hot Tomato, CMC International
- Formerly of: The Factory, Fraternity of Man, Little Feat, The Band, Robert Plant
- Website: www.littlefeat.net

Richard Hayward (February 6, 1946 – August 12, 2010) was an American drummer best known as a founding member and drummer in the band Little Feat. He performed with several bands and worked as a session player. Hayward also joined with friends in some small acting roles on television, which included an episode of F Troop.

== Career ==
Hayward first appeared to the public as a member of a band based in Southern California. Before he joined Little Feat he was a member of the groups The Fraternity of Man, and then The Factory, which was where he met the frontman of the band, Lowell George. The Factory portrayed an anachronistic Beatlesque band, the Bedbugs, on the February 9, 1967, episode of the sitcom F Troop.

In addition to his work with Little Feat, Hayward recorded and performed with many other artists including: Joan Armatrading, Delaney Bramlett, Kim Carnes, Eric Clapton, Ry Cooder, James Cotton, The Doobie Brothers, Bob Dylan, Peter Frampton, Buddy Guy, Arlo Guthrie, Al Kooper, Jonny Lang, Barbra Streisand, Eric Lynn, Nils Lofgren, Taj Mahal, Coco Montoya, Robert Palmer, Van Dyke Parks, Robert Plant, Paul Rodgers, Linda Ronstadt, Bob Seger, Carly Simon, Nancy Sinatra, Stephen Stills, Tom Waits, John Cale, Warren Zevon, Warren Haynes, Jimmy Herring, and Helen Watson. Hayward's talents were also utilized when he appeared as a member of another group in the 1978 film The Buddy Holly Story.

== Death ==
Richie Hayward died on August 12, 2010, from complications due to liver cancer. The day after his death Little Feat played a gig at Fairport's Cropredy Convention festival in Cropredy (UK), and spoke of their sadness performing without Hayward, Paul Barrere starting the gig with the words "Let's Rock For Richie".
