= Shaun Murphy (singer) =

American musician (born 1948)

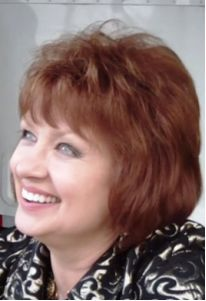
- Shaun Murphy in 2012

Background information
- Also known as: Stoney
- Born: May 6, 1948 (age 77); Omaha, Nebraska, U.S.
- Genres: Rock, blue-eyed soul, blues, gospel
- Occupation: Singer
- Years active: 1969–present
- Label: Motown

Shaun Murphy (born May 6, 1948) is an American blues and R&B singer songwriter, best known for her powerhouse singing style. Sometimes credited as Stoney, her recording career started in 1971 with Motown Records.

== Career ==
Murphy shared the stage with many Detroit-based bands, including Wilson Mower Pursuit and Jake Wade and the Soul Searchers, in venues such as Detroit's Grande Ballroom, as well as the first Ann Arbor Blues Festival in 1969, along with various large state fairground music venues. She was soon noticed by an employee of Motown in a touring theater production along with Texas native Meat Loaf. The two were signed by Rare Earth Records, a division of Motown Records, as Stoney and Meatloaf in 1971. That pairing was short-lived and became defunct, although they had previously also been fellow cast members of the Detroit production of Hair. Only Murphy was retained under contract after the breakup of the duo.

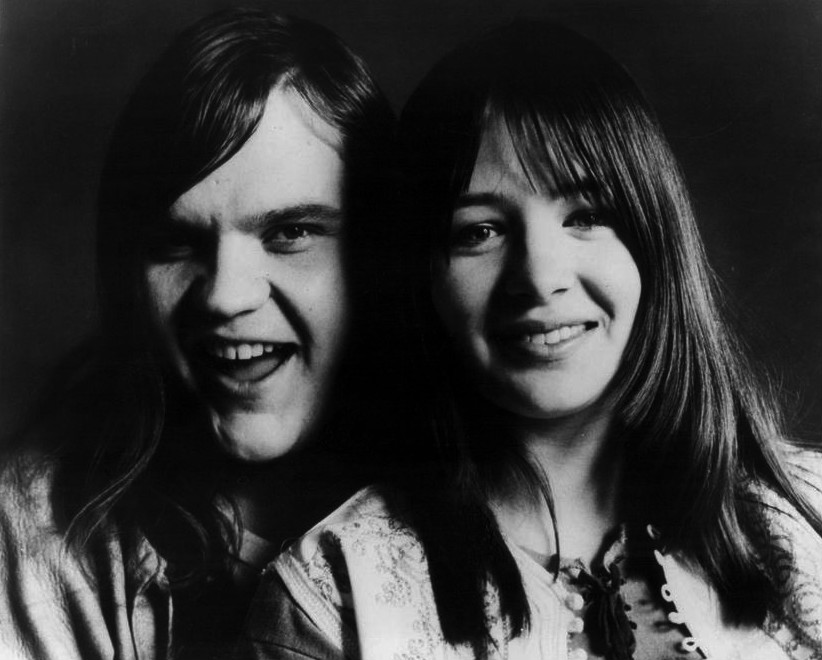
Meat Loaf and Stoney (Shaun Murphy), 1971

After a period of inactivity with the new division of Motown in Los Angeles, she left Motown and contacted Detroit music producer Punch Andrews for possible opportunities. Murphy then relocated back to Detroit in 1973 to work with Bob Seger. She has continued to work with Seger in the studio since 1973, in addition to performing on all of his tours since 1978.

She returned again to live in Los Angeles in 1985 while working with Eric Clapton on his Behind the Sun album. Murphy joined Clapton's band for the ensuing tour, which included Live Aid.

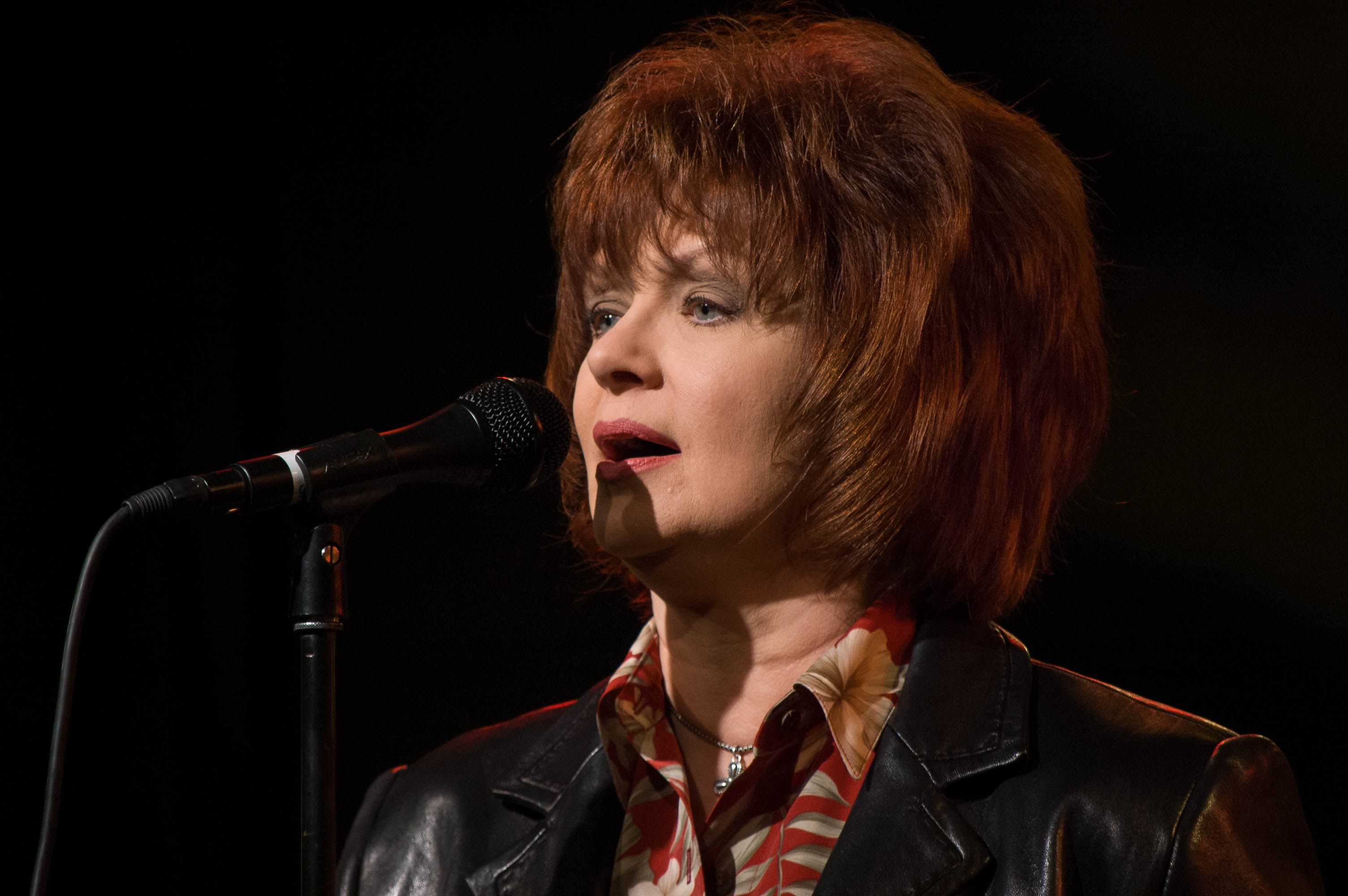
Shaun Murphy on stage with Little Feat at Rootsfestivalen in Brønnøysund, Norway, July 2008.

Murphy's career in vocals has been both as band lead singer and session singer. She has sung, toured, and recorded with such acts as the Moody Blues, Bob Seger, Herbie Hancock, Phil Collins, Glenn Frey, Joe Walsh, Maria Muldaur, Bruce Hornsby, Michael Bolton, Coco Montoya, Alice Cooper, Little Feat and performed in rock musicals such as Hair and Sgt. Pepper's.

In 1993, she became a full-time member of the Los Angeles–based band Little Feat. She stayed on for the next fifteen years, recording and touring with them until 2009.

In September 2009 the Shaun Murphy Band released the album Livin' The Blues. A second album, The Trouble With Lovin', followed in 2010. Late in 2011, Murphy released a DVD and live album both titled Shaun Murphy Live at Callahan's, recorded at Callahan's Music Hall, Auburn Hills, Michigan.

Her album Ask for the Moon, released in 2012, was nominated for three Grammy Awards and won two Blues Blast music awards. She released Cry Of Love in 2013. Loretta was released in February 2015. Mighty Gates was released in October 2017 on Vision Wall Records.

Murphy was nominated for the 2020 Independent Blues Award in five categories: Contemporary Blues CD, Female Artist, Traditional Blues Song, RNB Song, and Road Warrior.

Murphy's latest album, entitled I'm Coming Home, was released on June 5, 2023.

== Other sources ==
- Interview with Shaun Murphy at digitalinterviews.com
