= Kenny Gradney =

American bassist (born 1950)

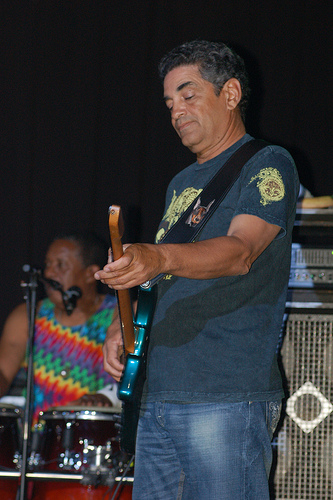
- Gradney performing with Little Feat in 2008

Background information
- Born: February 25, 1950 (age 76)
- Origin: Baton Rouge, Louisiana; United States
- Genres: Rock, roots rock, blues rock, swamp rock, jam band, jazz rock, jazz,
- Occupations: Musician; Songwriter
- Instrument: Bass guitar
- Years active: 1966–present
- Website: Little Feat.net Requires flash

Kenny Gradney (born February 25, 1950, in New Orleans, Louisiana) is an American bassist and songwriter, best known as a member of the band Little Feat.

== Biography ==
He joined after their second album, replacing founding bassist Roy Estrada in 1972. Gradney has remained their bassist ever since and coinciding with his arrival, his friend Sam Clayton also joined the band on percussion and Paul Barrere, who knew bandleader Lowell George from Hollywood High School, joined as a second guitarist and cementing the classic line-up of George, Barrere, Richie Hayward, Bill Payne, Gradney and Clayton.

In the summer of 1970, Gradney participated in a multi-group tour of Canadian stadium shows known as Festival Express as a member of Delaney & Bonnie & Friends in which all of the groups traveled together on a passenger train. He appears in the documentary film of the same name playing and partying with Janis Joplin, Bob Weir, Jerry Garcia, Rick Danko and others.

In addition to his work with Little Feat, Gradney has played and recorded with many notable musicians, including Delaney & Bonnie, The Flying Burrito Brothers, Bob Weir's Bobby and the Midnites, Jazz Is Dead, jazz drummer Chico Hamilton, Warren Zevon, Robert Palmer, Mick Fleetwood, and Carly Simon.
