= Rick Shlosser =

American drummer

- Born: Richard Drake Shlosser; December 7, 1946 (age 79); Springfield, Massachusetts, U.S.
- Genre: Rock
- Occupation: Drummer
- Instruments: Drums; percussion
- Years active: 1969–present
- Formerly of: Jack Mack and the Heart Attack

Richard Drake Shlosser (born December 7, 1946) attended the Berklee College of Music. He has been a member of Van Morrison's band and James Taylor's band and Jack Mack and the Heart Attack. He's also been a varied sessions drummer.

== Discography ==
=== 1970s ===
- Andy Pratt – Records Are Like Life (1969)
- Lamb – Bring Out the Sun (1971)
- Cris Williamson – Cris Williamson (1971)
- Ronnie Hawkins – The Hawk – Collection (1971)
- Van Morrison – Tupelo Honey (1971)
- Link Wray – Be What You Want To (1972)
- Eric Andersen – Blue River (1972)
- Pamela Polland – Pamela Polland (1972)
- Van Morrison – Saint Dominic's Preview (1972)
- Andy Pratt – Andy Pratt (1973)
- Thomas Jefferson Kaye – Thomas Jefferson Kaye (1973)
- Van Morrison – Hard Nose the Highway (1973)
- Link Wray – The Link Wray Rumble (1974)
- Art Garfunkel – Breakaway (1975)
- The Manhattan Transfer – Coming Out (1976)
- Leo Sayer – Endless Flight (1976)
- Rod Stewart – A Night on the Town (1976)
- Bob Crewe – Street Talk (1976)
- Diana Ross – Baby It's Me (1977)
- David Castle – Castle in the Sky (1977)
- Rory Block – Intoxication So Bitter Sweet (1977)
- Leif Garrett – Leif Garrett (1977)
- Burton Cummings – My Own Way to Rock (1977)
- Andy Pratt – Shiver in the Night (1977)
- Topaz – Topaz (1977)
- Art Garfunkel – Watermark (1977)
- The Bellamy Brothers – Beautiful Friends (1978)
- Stephen Bishop – Bish (1978)
- King of Hearts – Close But No Guitar (1978)
- Etta James – Deep in the Night (1978)
- Burton Cummings – Dream of a Child (1978)
- Steve Harley – Hobo with a Grin (1978)
- Dusty Springfield – It Begins Again (1978)
- Nicolette Larson – Nicolette (1978)
- Ronnie Montrose – Open Fire (1978)
- The Hues Corporation – Your Place or Mine (1978)
- Dream Babies – Bombs Away (1979)
- Michael Christian – Boy from New York City (1979)
- Tom Johnston – Everything You've Heard Is True (1979)
- Ronnie Hawkins – Hawk (1979)
- Leo Sayer – Here (1979)
- Nicolette Larson – In the Nick of Time – (1979)
- Bill Quateman – Just Like You (1979)
- Lauren Wood – Lauren Wood (1979)
- Maria Muldaur – Open Your Eyes (1979)
- Gilberto Gil – Realce (1979)
- Adam Mitchell – Redhead in Trouble (1979)
- Adrian Gurvitz – Sweet Vendetta (1979)
- Juice Newton – Take Heart (1979)
- Barbra Streisand – Wet (1979)
- Alessi Brothers – Words & Music (1979)

=== 1980s ===
- The Nitty Gritty Dirt Band – Make a Little Magic (1980)
- Livingston Taylor – Man's Best Friend (1980)
- John Cougar – Nothin' Matters and What If It Did (1980)
- Steve Cropper – Playin' My Thang (1980)
- Nicolette Larson – Radioland (1980)
- Raymond Louis Kennedy – Ray Kennedy (1980)
- Eric Carmen – Tonight You're Mine (1980)
- Burton Cummings – Woman Love (1980)
- Various Artists – Endless Love (1981 soundtrack) (1980)
- Dolly Parton – 9 to 5 and Odd Jobs (1980)
- Little Feat – Hoy-Hoy! (1981)
- The Nitty Gritty Dirt Band – Jealousy (1981)
- Juice Newton – Juice (1981)
- Lee Ritenour – Rit (1981)
- Art Garfunkel – Scissors Cut (1981)
- Tanya Tucker – Should I Do It (1981)
- Billy Preston – The Way I Am (1981)
- Nicolette Larson – All Dressed Up and No Place to Go (1982)
- Jack Mack and the Heartattack – Cardiac Party (1982)
- Linda Ronstadt – Get Closer (1982)
- Maynard Ferguson – Hollywood (1982)
- Cher – I Paralyze (1982)
- Stanley Clarke – Let Me Know You (1982)
- The Nitty Gritty Dirt Band – Let's Go (1982)
- John Fischer – Dark Horse (1982)
- Lionel Richie – Lionel Richie (1982)
- Juice Newton – Quiet Lies (1982)
- Patrick Simmons – Arcade (1983)
- Juice Newton – Dirty Looks (1983)
- Deborah Allen - Cheat the Night (1983)
- George Benson – 20/20 (1985)
- Barry Manilow – Manilow (1985)
- Janis Ian – Uncle Wonderful (1985)
- James Taylor – That's Why I'm Here (1985)
- Juice Newton – Old Flame (1986)

=== 1990s ===
- Joe Esposito – Treated & Released (1996)
- Jan Berry – Second Wave (1997)
- Marty Joe Kupersmith – It'll Come to You (1997)
- David Frankel Band – Deep Blue Goodbye (1998)
- Juice Newton – American Girl (1999)

=== 2000s ===
- Scott Ellison – Steamin (2000)
- Juice Newton – Every Road Leads Back to You (2002)
- Andy Pratt – Heaven and Earth (2003)
- Andy Pratt – New Resolutions (2004)
- Jennifer Getz – Makin' History (2004)
- DePresleys – Leaking Blue (2009)

=== 2010s ===
- DePresleys – Cosmic People (2012)
- DePresleys – Topanga (2012)
- DePresleys – Cobb Mountain Live (2014)
