= Shadows of Love =

Studio album by Nicolette Larson
- Released: 1988
- Studios: Obi-Wan Studio, Recco, Italy; Watermelon Studios, Milan, Italy; Steama Studios, Los Angeles, California
- Genre: Pop
- Length: 35:37
- Label: CGD
- Producers: Carlo Stretti, Ernesto Tabarelli

Nicolette Larson chronology
Rose of My Heart (1986)	Shadows of Love (1988)	Sleep, Baby, Sleep (1994)

Shadows of Love is the seventh studio album by the American pop singer Nicolette Larson. It was released in 1988 in Italy only through CGD Records. The album was produced by Carlo Stretti and Ernesto Tabarelli.

== Background ==
With Shadows of Love, Larson returned to pop following her crossover into country music (and some chart success) with the albums ...Say When (1985) and Rose of My Heart (1986). It was recorded in Italy during 1987 at Studio Watermelon in Milan, and released the following year. Due to its limited release outside of the U.S. and the subsequent demise of its record label, the album was not a commercial success.

The album features eight tracks, two co-written by Larson. The title track is a cover of the 1986 song by Wax, the duo of its songwriters Andrew Gold and Graham Gouldman. "Love Hurts", written by Felice and Boudleaux Bryant, was originally released by The Everly Brothers in 1960. Two songs are by American singer-songwriter Lauren Wood: "Work on It" and "Where Did I Get These Tears". They were originally released by Wood on her 1981 album Cat Trick and her 1979 debut album, respectively. Another of Wood's songs, "Fallen", had previously been included on Larson's album In the Nick of Time.

The album's sole single was "Let Me Be the One", written by Larson with Mauro Paoluzzi, and issued on 7" and 12" vinyl by CGD in Europe. Co-produced by Paoluzzi, the single featured "Where Did I Get These Tears" as the B-side. The 7" release featured an edited version of "Let Me Be the One", approximately one minute shorter than on the album, while the 12" used the full-length album version. The song failed to chart and was Larson's last single release. In 1988, Larson contributed songs to two films, Renegade and Twins. "Let Me Be the One" was used in Renegade and included on the soundtrack album, issued by WEA in Germany that year.

As Larson's final mainstream album release, Shadows of Love would be the artist's penultimate studio album before her death in 1997. Sleep, Baby, Sleep, a collection of children's lullabies released in 1994, would be her last record.

== Release ==
Shadows of Love was released on vinyl and cassette and only in Italy, and went out of print not long after it was issued. During the year of the album's release, CGD (Compagnia Generale del Disco) went out of business. Warner Music Group acquired the label to form CGD East West and continued CGD's operations. In 2013, Pro Music issued a limited run of promotional slipcase CD copies of the album.

== Track listing ==
No.	Title	Writer(s)	Length
1.	"Love's Light"	Nicolette Larson, V. Bianchi, G. Bianchi	5:12
2.	"Stay With Me Tonight"	Bob Heatlie	3:47
3.	"Work on It"	Lauren Wood	4:01
4.	"Let Me Be the One"	Larson, Mauro Paoluzzi	5:11
5.	"Love Hurts"	Felice and Boudleaux Bryant	3:46
6.	"Rebel in the Rain"	Paoluzzi, Timothy Touchton	5:13
7.	"Where Did I Get These Tears"	Wood	3:48
8.	"Shadows of Love"	Andrew Gold, Graham Gouldman	4:21

== Personnel ==
- Nicolette Larson – vocals
- Mimmo Bianchi – keyboards, bass programming, drums, arrangements (1–3, 5–8)
- Andrea Braido – guitars
- Riccardo Luppi – saxophones
- Mauro Paoluzzi – arrangements (4)
- Daniela Rando – backing vocals
- Gwen Aanti – backing vocals (1–3, 5–8)
- Massimo Crestini – backing vocals (4)
- Betty Vittori – backing vocals (4)

=== Production ===
- Carlo Stretti – producer (1–3, 5–8), mixing (1–3, 5–8), co-producer (4)
- Ernesto Tabarelli – producer (1–3, 5–8), co-producer (4)
- Mauro Paoluzzi – producer (4)
- Paul Jeffery – sound engineer (1–3, 5–8)
- Nicola Calgari – mixing (1–3, 5–8)
- Luigi Macchiaizzano – recording (4), mixing (4)
- Daniele Delfitto – mastering
- Fabio Nosotti – photography
- Rick Alter Management, Inc. – management
