= Up on the Roof: Songs from the Brill Building =

Studio album by Neil Diamond
- Released: 31 August 1993
- Recorded: 1993
- Studio: Conway Studios (Hollywood, California); Arch Angel Studios (Los Angeles, California); Air Lyndhurst Hall (London, England, UK)
- Genre: Pop rock
- Length: 55:48
- Label: Columbia
- Producer: Peter Asher

Neil Diamond chronology
The Christmas Album (1992)	Up on the Roof: Songs from the Brill Building (1993)	Live in America (1994)

Up On the Roof: Songs from the Brill Building, released in 1993 on Columbia Records, is a cover album and also the twenty-first studio album by Neil Diamond. It contains a duet with Dolly Parton, string arrangements by David Campbell, along with re-makes of tracks associated with the Brill Building, where Diamond had worked in the 1960s.

It was certified Gold by the Recording Industry Association of America.

== Track listing ==
No.	Title	Writer(s)	Length
1.	"You've Lost That Lovin' Feelin'" (duet with Dolly Parton)	Phil Spector, Barry Mann, Cynthia Weil	4:31
2.	"Up on the Roof"	Gerry Goffin, Carole King	3:29
3.	"Love Potion Number Nine"	Jerry Leiber, Mike Stoller	3:05
4.	"Will You Love Me Tomorrow"	Gerry Goffin, Carole King	3:29
5.	"Don't Be Cruel"	Otis Blackwell	3:46
6.	"Do Wah Diddy Diddy" (duet with Mary's Danish)	Jeff Barry, Ellie Greenwich	2:55
7.	"I (Who Have Nothing)"	Carlo Donida, Mogol, Jerry Leiber, Mike Stoller	4:05
8.	"Do You Know the Way to San José?"	Burt Bacharach, Hal David	3:03
9.	"Don't Make Me Over"	Burt Bacharach, Hal David	3:37
10.	"River Deep - Mountain High"	Phil Spector, Jeff Barry, Ellie Greenwich	3:58
11.	"A Groovy Kind of Love"	Toni Wine, Carole Bayer Sager	2:52
12.	"Spanish Harlem"	Jerry Leiber, Phil Spector	3:43
13.	"Sweets for My Sweet"	Doc Pomus, Mort Shuman	2:53
14.	"Happy Birthday Sweet Sixteen"	Neil Sedaka, Howard Greenfield	3:39
15.	"Ten Lonely Guys"	Bob Feldman, Jerry Goldstein, Richard Gottehrer, Stanley Kahan, Eddie Snyder, Neil Diamond	4:16
16.	"Save the Last Dance for Me"	Doc Pomus, Mort Shuman	2:27

== Personnel ==
Musicians and vocals

- Neil Diamond – vocals
- Robbie Buchanan – keyboards (1, 2, 4, 7–9, 11–13, 16), acoustic piano (14, 15)
- Jim Cox – Wurlitzer electric piano (3, 5), Hammond B3 organ (10), bass (12)
- Bill Payne – acoustic piano (5, 14, 16)
- Bob Mann – guitars (1, 3–5, 7–15)
- Dean Parks – guitars (2, 7, 13, 16)
- David King – guitars (6)
- Louis Gutierrez – guitars (6)
- Doug Livingston – pedal steel guitar (14)
- Larry Klein – bass (1–3), additional bass (12)
- Bob Glaub – bass (4, 5, 7–16)
- Chris Wagner – bass (6)
- Carlos Vega – drums (1–3, 5, 10, 12–14)
- Russ Kunkel – drums (4, 7–9, 11, 15)
- James Bradley Jr. – drums (6)
- Peter Asher – percussion (1, 5, 11–13, 16), marimba (12)
- Michael Fisher – percussion (4, 8, 10, 11)
- M.B. Gordy – timpani (6), vibraphone (11)
- Bill Bergman – saxophones (3, 5, 10, 16), sax solo (3)
- Don Markese – clarinets (3, 5, 10, 16), flutes (3, 5, 10, 16), saxophones (3, 5, 10, 16)
- Lon Price – saxophones (3, 5, 10, 16)
- Brandon Fields – alto saxophone (4)
- Greg Smith – bass saxophone (13)
- Nick Lane – trombone (3, 5, 10, 16)
- Wayne Bergeron – trumpet (3, 5, 10, 16)
- Dennis Farias – trumpet (3, 5, 10, 16)
- Oscar Brashear – trumpet (12)
- Gavyn Wright – concertmaster
- Isobel Griffiths – musical contractor
- Dolly Parton – vocals (1)
- Rosemary Butler – backing vocals (1, 3, 5, 10, 16)
- Wendy Fraser – backing vocals (1, 3, 5, 10, 16)
- Portia Griffin – backing vocals (1, 3, 5, 10, 16)
- Raven Kane – backing vocals (1, 3, 10, 16), vocal contractor
- Andrea Robinson – backing vocals (1, 3, 5, 10, 16)
- Julia Tillman Waters – backing vocals (1, 3, 5, 10, 13, 16)
- Maxine Waters Willard – backing vocals (1, 3, 5, 10, 16)
- Terry Wood – backing vocals (1, 3, 10, 16)
- Carmen Twillie – backing vocals (1, 3, 5, 10, 16)
- Valerie Carter – backing vocals (4, 11, 13)
- Kate Markowitz – backing vocals (4, 11, 13)
- Laura Satterfield – backing vocals (4, 5, 11)
- Donna Davidson – backing vocals (5)
- Stephanie Spruill – backing vocals (5)
- Julie Ritter – backing vocals (6)
- Gretchen Seager – backing vocals (6)
- Josef Powell – backing vocals (13)
- Oren Waters – backing vocals (13, 15)
- Randy Crenshaw – backing vocals (14, 15)
- Jon Joyce – backing vocals (14, 15)
- Gene Morford – backing vocals (14, 15)
- Jerry Whitman – backing vocals (14, 15)
- Roger Freeland – backing vocals (15)
- Donny Gerrard – backing vocals (15)
- John Hendricks – backing vocals (15)
- Steve Lively – backing vocals (15)
- Rick Logan – backing vocals (15)

Arrangements

- Peter Asher – rhythm arrangements (1–6, 8, 10–16), orchestral arrangements (2), BGV arrangements (5)
- The Neil Diamond Band – rhythm arrangements (1, 3–5, 10, 11, 13, 14, 16)
- David Campbell – orchestral arrangements (1–4, 8, 10–16), orchestra conductor (1, 3, 4, 7–16), BGV arrangements (1, 3, 4, 10–16), horn arrangements (3, 5, 16), rhythm arrangements (8), arrangements (9)
- Mary's Danish – rhythm arrangements (6)
- Alan Lindgren – arrangements (7)
- The Ten Lonely Guys – rhythm arrangements (15)

=== Production ===
- Peter Asher – producer
- Frank Wolf – recording, mixing
- Bernie Becker – additional engineer
- Jeff Foster – assistant engineer
- Nathaniel Kunkle – assistant engineer
- Gil Morales – assistant engineer
- Jeff Orchard – assistant engineer
- Marnie Riley – assistant engineer
- Brian Soucy – assistant engineer
- Brett Swain – assistant engineer
- George Marino – mastering at Sterling Sound (New York City, New York)
- Cathy Kerr – production assistant
- Ivy Skoff – production coordinator
- Sam Cole – project coordinator
- David Kirschner – art direction
- Jan Weinberg – design
- Barbara Lebow – additional design
- William Dely – illustration
- Eugene Adabari – cover photography
- David Attie – additional photography
- BMI Photo Archives – additional photography
- Impact Photos – additional photography
- Michael Ochs Photos – additional photography
- Neil Diamond – liner notes
- Tom Hensley – note editing

== Charts ==
Chart (1993)	Peak position
Australian Albums (ARIA)	25
Dutch Albums (Album Top 100)	77
UK Albums (OCC)	28
US Billboard 200	28

== Certifications ==
Region	Certification	Certified units/sales
United Kingdom (BPI)	Silver	60,000^{^}
United States (RIAA)	Gold	500,000^{^}
^{^} Shipments figures based on certification alone.
