= Radioland (album) =

Studio album by Nicolette Larson
- Released: January 1981
- Studios: Sunset Sound Recorders (Hollywood, California); Warner Bros. Recording Studios (Los Angeles, California)
- Genre: Pop
- Length: 30:22
- Label: Warner Bros.
- Producer: Ted Templeman

Nicolette Larson chronology
In the Nick of Time (1979)	Radioland (1981)	All Dressed Up and No Place to Go (1982)

Radioland is the third studio album by American singer Nicolette Larson. It was produced by Ted Templeman and released by Warner Bros. Records in 1981.

== Background ==
Radioland reached No. 62 on the Billboard 200 and remained on the charts for twelve weeks. Three singles were released from the album during 1981; "Ooo-Eee" in January, "How Can We Go On" in April and "Radioland" in June. All three failed to appear on the Billboard Hot 100. Radioland later received its first release on CD from Wounded Bird Records in 2005.

== Critical reception ==
Professional ratings
Review scores
Source	Rating
AllMusic	3/5 stars

On its release, Billboard commented that the album "explores the full range of Larson's talent, from hard-rocking numbers like 'Radioland' to a bluesy torch ballad, 'Long Distance Love'". They added, "There are also shades of pretty, sinuous midtempo pop-rock, along the lines of her hit 'Lotta Love'." Cash Box noted Larson's "inspiring vocal versatility" and Templeman's "beautifully thick production". They concluded, "This something-for-everyone LP is suited to a variety of formats." In a retrospective review, Bruce Eder of AllMusic felt the album was a "bold, melodic collection of midtempo country-inspired pop/rock". He added, "Her voice isn't always strong or rich enough to sustain interest in which she's singing, but the diversity of sounds holds the interest."

== Track listing ==
No.	Title	Writer(s)	Length
1.	"Radioland"	Sumner Mering	3:08
2.	"Ooo-Eee"	Annie McLoone	3:28
3.	"How Can We Go On"	Andrew Kastner	3:27
4.	"When You Come Around"	Nicolette Larson, Andrew Kastner, Larry John McNally	2:51
5.	"Tears, Tears and More Tears"	Allen Toussaint	3:45
6.	"Straight from the Heart"	Andrew Kastner	3:35
7.	"Been Gone Too Long"	Lauren Wood	3:26
8.	"Fool for Love"	Adam Mitchell	3:43
9.	"Long Distance Love"	Lowell George	2:59

== Personnel ==
- Nicolette Larson – lead vocals, backing vocals (2–8)
- Doug Livingston – Fender Rhodes (1, 2, 7, 8)
- Bill Payne – synthesizer (1, 4), keyboards (5), synthesizer solo (7), organ (8), Fender Rhodes (9)
- Mark T. Jordan – keyboards (3, 6), synthesizer (3), Fender Rhodes (4), organ (9)
- John McFee – guitar (1–4, 7–8)
- Paul Barrere – guitar (1, 2, 5, 7, 8)
- Patrick Simmons – guitar solo (1)
- Andrew Kastner – guitar (3, 4, 6)
- Fred Tackett – guitar (9)
- Tiran Porter – bass guitar (1–4, 6–8)
- Bob Glaub – bass guitar (5)
- Klaus Voormann – bass guitar (9)
- Keith Knudsen – drums (1, 2, 7, 8)
- Rick Shlosser – drums (3–6, 9)
- Ted Templeman – percussion (1–7), backing vocals (2, 5–8)
- Bobby LaKind – congas (1–8)
- Jerry Jumonville – saxophone (5)
- Gene Meros – saxophone (6)
- Lee Thornburg – trumpet (5)
- Linda Ronstadt – backing vocals (2)
- Maureen McDonald – backing vocals (3–5, 7)

Production

- Ted Templeman – producer
- Jim Isaacson – engineer
- Gene Meros – additional engineer
- Kent Duncan – mastering at Kendun Recorders (Burbank, California)
- Joan Vallejo – production coordinator
- Gribbitt!, Murry Whiteman – design
- Pete Johnson – art direction
- George Holz – photography

== Charts ==
Chart (1982)	Peak position
Australian Albums Chart	68
US Billboard 200	62
