= Bob Glaub =

American bass player and session musician (born 1952)

- Born: May 10, 1952 (age 74)
- Genres: Pop; rock
- Occupations: Musician; composer
- Instrument: Bass guitar
- Years active: 1973–present

Bob Glaub (born May 10, 1952) is an American bass player and session musician. He has played with such artists and bands as Dave Mason, Journey, Steve Miller Band, John Fogerty, Bruce Springsteen, Bob Dylan, Neil Diamond, Jerry Lee Lewis, Ringo Starr, Dusty Springfield, Aaron Neville, Linda Ronstadt, Stevie Nicks, Jackson Browne, Warren Zevon, Donna Summer, John Lennon, Rod Stewart, Crosby, Stills & Nash Bee Gees and many others.

Glaub started his career in 1973 playing for Jesse Ed Davis' record Keep Me Comin', which led him to work on records of artists such as Arlo Guthrie, Booker T. Jones, Dave Mason, Rod Stewart, Warren Zevon, Jackson Browne, Leo Sayer, Carly Simon, Robby Krieger and Steve Miller Band, before he joined Jackson Browne's band in 1978 and left in 1989. The next years saw him playing on records by Gladys Knight, Katy Moffatt, Dusty Springfield, Bonnie Raitt, Nicolette Larson, Cher, Kiki Dee, Jennifer Warnes, Rita Coolidge, Donna Summer, Eric Carmen, Gordon Lightfoot, Karla Bonoff, Eddie Money, Peter Cetera, Stevie Nicks, Amy Holland, Bee Gees and Linda Ronstadt, while joining her live band in 1980 until 2000.

The 1980s saw him doing session work for Albert Hammond, Crosby, Stills, Nash & Young, Laura Branigan, Jimmy Buffett, Steve Perry, Donovan, Rosanne Cash, USA for Africa, Bob Dylan, Dolly Parton, Journey, Dan Fogelberg, Feargal Sharkey, Lone Justice, Kim Carnes, Patti Smith as well as The Eagles' Don Henley, Glenn Frey and Timothy B. Schmit.

In the 1990s he played on records by Aaron Neville, Alexander O'Neal, Jon Bon Jovi, The Simpsons, Randy Travis, Hanne Boel, Bob Seger, Neil Diamond, Ringo Starr, Leonard Cohen, Tracy Chapman, John Trudell, Taj Mahal, Percy Sledge, Adam Sandler, Neal Casal, Johnny Rivers, Sarah Brightman, Coco Montoya, Journey and joined John Fogerty for recording, live touring and the DVD Premonition.

Since the new millennium he has also appeared on records by Lifehouse, Natalie Merchant, The Calling, Eric Burdon, David Charvet, Dwight Yoakam, Ron Sexsmith, Hilary Scott, The Beach Boys and appeared on the Brokeback Mountain soundtrack.

The Lakland Bob Glaub Signature Model bass guitar is named for him since 1999. It was based on his vintage 1964 Fender Precision Bass.

In 2013 he played on Randy Newman's motion picture soundtrack Monsters University.

== Collaborations ==
- Keep Me Comin' - Jesse Ed Davis (1973)
- Last of the Brooklyn Cowboys - Arlo Guthrie (1973)
- Dave Mason - Dave Mason (1974)
- Atlantic Crossing - Rod Stewart (1975)
- The Pretender - Jackson Browne (1976)
- Another Passenger - Carly Simon (1976)
- Endless Flight - Leo Sayer (1976)
- Warren Zevon - Warren Zevon (1976)
- A Night on the Town - Rod Stewart (1976)
- Nicolette - Nicolette Larson (1978)
- Hobo with a Grin - Steve Harley (1978)
- Excitable Boy - Warren Zevon (1978)
- It Begins Again - Dusty Springfield (1978)
- Shot Through the Heart - Jennifer Warnes (1979)
- Here - Leo Sayer (1979)
- Bad Girls - Donna Summer (1979)
- Satisfied - Rita Coolidge (1979)
- Take Me Home - Cher (1979)
- The Glow - Bonnie Raitt (1979)
- In the Nick of Time - Nicolette Larson (1979)
- Tonight You're Mine - Eric Carmen (1980)
- Dream Street Rose - Gordon Lightfoot (1980)
- Hold Out - Jackson Browne (1980)
- Mad Love - Linda Ronstadt (1980)
- Heaven Above Me - Frankie Valli (1980)
- Playing for Keeps - Eddie Money (1980)
- Radioland - Nicolette Larson (1981)
- Bella Donna - Stevie Nicks (1981)
- Heartbreak Radio - Rita Coolidge (1981)
- Peter Cetera - Peter Cetera (1981)
- Rock Away - Phoebe Snow (1981)
- No Fun Aloud - Glenn Frey (1982)
- Angel Heart - Jimmy Webb (1982)
- Wild Heart of the Young - Karla Bonoff (1982)
- I Can't Stand Still - Don Henley (1982)
- Get Closer - Linda Ronstadt (1982)
- The Envoy - Warren Zevon (1982)
- All Dressed Up and No Place to Go - Nicolette Larson (1982)
- Branigan - Laura Branigan (1982)
- The Wild Heart - Stevie Nicks (1983)
- Lawyers in Love - Jackson Browne (1983)
- Speeding Time - Carole King (1983)
- One Particular Harbour - Jimmy Buffett (1983)
- Street Talk - Steve Perry (1984)
- Lady of the Stars - Donovan (1984)
- Rock a Little - Stevie Nicks (1985)
- Real Love - Dolly Parton (1985)
- Empire Burlesque - Bob Dylan (1985)
- Rhythm & Romance - Rosanne Cash (1985)
- Lives in the Balance - Jackson Browne (1986)
- Raised on Radio - Journey (1986)
- Light House - Kim Carnes (1986)
- Street Language - Rodney Crowell (1986)
- Exiles - Dan Fogelberg (1987)
- Rainbow - Dolly Parton (1987)
- Dream of Life - Patti Smith (1988)
- Wish - Feargal Sharkey (1988)
- Out of Order - Rod Stewart (1988)
- World in Motion - Jackson Browne (1989)
- The End of the Innocence - Don Henley (1989)
- Transverse City - Warren Zevon (1989)
- Blaze of Glory - Jon Bon Jovi (1990)
- The Wild Places - Dan Fogelberg (1990)
- Warm Your Heart - Aaron Neville (1991)
- Mr. Bad Example - Warren Zevon (1991)
- The Fire Inside - Bob Seger (1991)
- Lovescape - Neil Diamond (1991)
- Right Here - Eddie Money (1991)
- The Missing Years - John Prine (1991)
- The Future - Leonard Cohen (1992)
- Come On Come On - Mary Chapin Carpenter (1992)
- Time Takes Time - Ringo Starr (1992)
- Matters of the Heart - Tracy Chapman (1992)
- The Christmas Album - Neil Diamond (1992)
- River of Souls - Dan Fogelberg (1993)
- Winter Light - Linda Ronstadt (1993)
- Up on the Roof: Songs from the Brill Building - Neil Diamond (1993)
- Let the Picture Paint Itself - Rodney Crowell (1994)
- It's a Mystery - Bob Seger (1995)
- Feels Like Home - Linda Ronstadt (1995)
- A Place in the World - Mary Chapin Carpenter (1996)
- Blue Moon Swamp - John Fogerty (1997)
- We Ran - Linda Ronstadt (1998)
- Inside Job - Don Henley (2000)
- Someday - Susanna Hoffs (2012)
- Standing in the Breach - Jackson Browne (2014)
- Today Is Christmas - LeAnn Rimes (2015)
- Carousel One - Ron Sexsmith (2015)

| Preceded by Ross Valory | Journey bass-guitarist 1986 | Succeeded by Randy Jackson |
