= Nicolette (album) =

Studio album by Nicolette Larson
- Released: September 29, 1978
- Studios: Warner Bros. Recording Studios, Los Angeles, California
- Genre: Folk pop
- Length: 38:09
- Label: Warner Bros.
- Producer: Ted Templeman

Nicolette Larson chronology
Nicolette (1978)	In the Nick of Time (1979)

Singles from Nicolette
- 1. "Lotta Love" Released: 1978; 2. "Rhumba Girl" Released: 1979; 3. "Give a Little" Released: 1979

Professional ratings
Review scores
Source	Rating
AllMusic	4/5 stars
Christgau's Record Guide	C−

Nicolette is the debut album by Nicolette Larson, released in 1978 by Warner Bros. Records. It reached No. 15 on the US pop albums chart and No. 1 in Canada and was certified Gold in both countries.

Larson gained public attention singing backup for Neil Young on American Stars 'n Bars and Comes a Time. Her first charting single was Young's composition "Lotta Love". As a single, it hit No. 1 on the Billboard Adult Contemporary chart, No. 8 on the Billboard Hot 100, No. 8 on the Cash Box Top 100, and No. 8 in Record World magazine. The follow-up single, "Rhumba Girl", fell short of the US top 40 but reached No. 15 in Canada and No. 4 on the Canadian Adult Contemporary chart.

Eddie Van Halen appears uncredited on guitar on "Can't Get Away from You".

The album was re-released on CD in 2005 on the Wounded Bird label.

== Album cover photo ==
The cover photo of the album was taken in the Garden Court restaurant at The Palace Hotel, San Francisco.

== Track listing ==
No.	Title	Writer(s)	Length
1.	"Lotta Love"	Neil Young	3:11
2.	"Rhumba Girl"	Jesse Winchester	3:52
3.	"You Send Me"	Sam Cooke	3:56
4.	"Can't Get Away from You"	Lauren "Chunky" Wood	3:17
5.	"Mexican Divorce"	Bob Hilliard, Burt Bacharach	3:57
6.	"Baby Don't You Do It"	Holland, Dozier, Holland	3:42
7.	"Give a Little"	Bill Payne, Fran Payne	3:00
8.	"Angels Rejoiced"	Ira Louvin, Charlie Louvin	2:27
9.	"French Waltz"	Adam Mitchell	4:22
10.	"Come Early Mornin'"	Bob McDill	2:42
11.	"Last in Love"	Glenn Frey, JD Souther	3:43

== Personnel ==
- Nicolette Larson – vocals, backing vocals, guitar, percussion
- Paul Barrère – guitar
- James Burton – guitar, dobro
- Valerie Carter – backing vocals
- Victor Feldman – vibes, percussion
- Michael McDonald – backing vocals
- Bill Payne – keyboards
- Herb Pedersen – guitar, backing vocals
- Linda Ronstadt – backing vocals
- Bob Glaub – bass guitar
- Mark T. Jordan – keyboards
- David Kalish – guitar
- Bobby LaKind – percussion, conga, triangle
- Albert Lee – guitar, mandolin
- Fred Tackett – guitar
- Ted Templeman – percussion, backing vocals
- Klaus Voormann – bass guitar
- Sid Sharp – synthesizer, concertmaster
- Jimmie Haskell – strings, accordion, conductor, string arrangements, woodwind arrangement
- Chuck Findley – horn
- Jim Horn – horn
- Plas Johnson – flute
- Andrew Love – saxophone
- Steve Madaio – horn
- Rick Shlosser – drums
- Patrick Simmons – guitar
- Edward Van Halen - guitar on "Can't Get Away from You"

Additional personnel

- Donn Landee – engineer
- Mike Zagaris – photography
- Joel Bernstein – sleeve photo
- Dave Bhang – art direction, design

== Charts ==
Chart (1978–1979)	Peak position
Australia (Kent Music Report)	6
Canada	1
US Top LPs & Tape (Billboard)	15

== Certifications and sales ==
Region	Certification	Certified units/sales
Australia (ARIA)	Gold	20,000^{^}
Canada (Music Canada)	Gold	50,000^{^}
United States (RIAA)	Gold	500,000^{^}
^{^} Shipments figures based on certification alone.
