= Lauren Wood (album) =

Studio album by Lauren Wood
- Released: 1979
- Genre: Soft rock
- Length: 40:14
- Label: Warner Bros.
- Producer: Michael J. Jackson

Singles from Lauren Wood
- 1. "Please Don't Leave" Released: August 1979

Lauren Wood, released in 1979, is the first eponymous album by Lauren Wood. It features her Chunky, Novi & Ernie bandmates Novi Novog (her cousin), and bassist Ernie Emerita. The disc is studded with guest stars including Little Feat members Bill Payne and Fred Tackett, Steve Lukather, Ronnie Montrose and Jim Keltner. Her duet with Michael McDonald, "Please Don't Leave", went to #5 on Billboard's Adult Contemporary chart and #24 on the Pop Singles chart.

== Track listing ==
All songs written by Lauren Wood except "Nothin' But a Heartache" by Michael McDonald and "Dirty Work" by Donald Fagen and Walter Becker

1. "Please Don't Leave" (3:58) Vocals - Lauren Wood, Michael McDonald; Piano, Synthesizer solo - Bill Payne
2. "Save the Man" (4:19) Guitar solo - Jay Graydon; Viola - Novi; Syndrums - Alvin Taylor
3. "Hollywood" (5:12) Guitar solo - Summer Mering; Synthesizer solo - Novi
4. "Nothin' But a Heartache" (3:50) Tenor saxophone solo - John Klemmer; Background vocals - Wood, McDonald, John Townsend, Rosemary Butler, Bobby LaKind
5. "Gotta Lotta" (4:03) Synthesizer intro - Duncan Mackay; Saxophone solo - Andrew Love; Horns - Love and Ben Cauley
6. "Where Did I Get These Tears" (4:31) Viola solo - Novi
7. "Dirty Work" (3:44) Guitar solo - Ronnie Montrose; Synthesizer - Mackay; Background vocals - Wood, McDonald, Townsend, Butler, Patrick Simmons
8. "Time Zone" (5:52) Synthesizer - Novi; Background vocals - Wood, McDonald, Townsend, Butler, LaKind
9. "Overload " (4:31) Acoustic piano and all vocals - Wood; String arrangement - Novi

== Personnel ==
- Lauren "Chunky" Wood - lead vocals
- Lauren "Chunky" Wood, Bill Payne, Jai Winding - keyboards
- Jeff Porcaro, Jim Keltner, Alvin Taylor, Michael Baird, Rick Shlosser - drums
- Ernie Emerita, Abraham Laboriel, David Hungate - bass
- Steve Lukather, Fred Tackett, Jay Graydon, Ronnie Montrose, Sumner Mering - guitars
- Novi, Bill Payne, Duncan Mackay - synthesizer
- Novi - viola
- John Klemmer - tenor saxophone
- Andrew Love - saxophone
- Marcy Dicterow Vaj - concertmistress
- Paul Lani, Steve Forman, Bobby LaKind, Michael J. Jackson, Sinclair Rogers Lott III, Debra Dobkin - percussion
- Bill Champlin, Arno Lucas, Bobby Kimball, Lauren "Chunky" Wood, John Townsend, Michael McDonald, Pat Simmons, Ricardo de Campas, Ki-Ki Koury, Rosemary Butler - additional background vocals

== Production ==
- Produced by Michael J. Jackson, "Please Don't Leave" produced by Jackson and Ted Templeman
- Engineered by James Isaacson
