= Half a Chance =

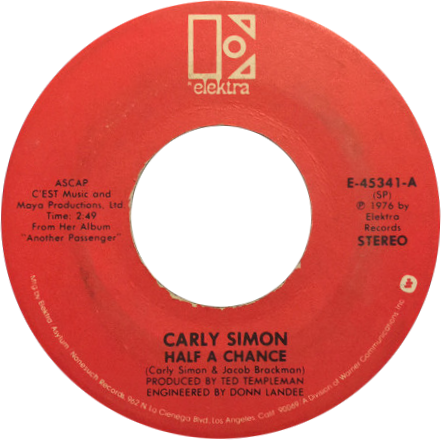
- A-side label of the US single

Single by Carly Simon

from the album Another Passenger
- B-side: "Libby"
- Released: August 17, 1976
- Recorded: 1976
- Genre: Pop, rock
- Length: 2:55 (album version)
- Label: Elektra
- Songwriters: Carly Simon, Jacob Brackman
- Producer: Ted Templeman

Carly Simon singles chronology
"It Keeps You Runnin'" (1976)	"Half a Chance" (1976)	"Nobody Does It Better" (1977)

"Half a Chance" is a song written by Carly Simon and Jacob Brackman, performed by Simon, and produced by Ted Templeman. The song served as the second single from Simon's sixth studio album, Another Passenger (1976). Simon made her only appearance on Saturday Night Live on May 8, 1976, where she performed the song, along with "You're So Vain". It was a pre-taped performance—a rare occurrence on that show—because Simon suffered terrible bouts of stage fright.

== Reception ==
"Half a Chance" reached No. 39 on the Billboard Easy Listening chart. Cashbox said of the single that "the chorus is authoritative, filled with confidence, and, as usual, her words are striking." Ken Tucker, writing in Rolling Stone, referred to it as "entertaining, loping, slick."

== Track listing ==
7" single

- "Half a Chance" – 2:49
- "Libby" – 4:38

== Charts ==
Chart (1976)	Peak Position
US Billboard Easy Listening	39
