= The Christmas Album (Neil Diamond album) =

Studio album by Neil Diamond
- Released: September 22, 1992
- Recorded: January – August 1992
- Studios: Arch Angel Studios, The Complex and Studio 55 (Los Angeles, California); Conway Studios and Ocean Way Recording (Hollywood, California); The Hit Factory (New York City, New York); Abbey Road Studios (London, England)
- Genre: Christmas
- Length: 44:58
- Label: Columbia
- Producer: Peter Asher

Neil Diamond chronology
Lovescape (1991)	The Christmas Album (1992)	Up on the Roof: Songs from the Brill Building (1993)

Professional ratings
Review scores
Source	Rating
Allmusic	3/5 stars

The Christmas Album is the twentieth studio album by Neil Diamond and his first to feature Christmas music. It features orchestral and choir arrangements by David Campbell. The album reached No. 8 on the Billboard 200 album sales chart, No. 50 on the UK album sales chart, and No. 30 on Australian music chart.

In his review music critic Johnny Loftus states, "While Neil Diamond's The Christmas Album is designed almost exclusively for his adult contemporary constituency, the vocalist still manages to light up most of the obviousness of these standards with his trademark gritty soul and flair for inflection."

On August 7, 2001, The Christmas Album was certified Double Platinum by the RIAA for shipment of two million copies in the United States since its 1992 release. By November 2014, it was the twenty-fifth best-selling Christmas/holiday album in the United States of the SoundScan era of music sales tracking (March 1991–present), having sold 1,910,000 copies according to SoundScan.

== Track listing ==
No.	Title	Writer(s)	Length
1.	"O come, O come, Emmanuel" / "We Three Kings of Orient Are"	Traditional	2:57
2.	"Silent Night"	Franz Gruber, Joseph Mohr	4:03
3.	"The Little Drummer Boy"	Katherine Davis, Henry Onorati, Harry Simeone	3:58
4.	"Santa Claus Is Coming to Town"	John Frederick Coots, Haven Gillespie	3:25
5.	"The Christmas Song"	Mel Tormé, Robert Wells	3:33
6.	"Morning Has Broken"	Eleanor Farjeon, Cat Stevens	3:02
7.	"Happy Xmas (War Is Over)"	John Lennon, Yoko Ono	4:19
8.	"White Christmas"	Irving Berlin	3:55
9.	"God Rest Ye Merry Gentlemen"	Traditional	1:20
10.	"Jingle Bell Rock"	Joe Beal, Jim Boothe	1:51
11.	"Hark! The Herald Angels Sing"	Felix Mendelssohn, Charles Wesley	2:50
12.	"Silver Bells"	Ray Evans, Jay Livingston	3:06
13.	"You Make It Feel Like Christmas"	Neil Diamond	3:39
14.	"O Holy Night"	Adolphe Adam, John Sullivan Dwight	3:28

== Personnel ==
Musicians and vocalists

- Neil Diamond – vocals
- Robbie Buchanan – acoustic piano (2, 14), keyboards (3–6, 8, 13)
- Ladd Thomas – organ (6, 11)
- Alan Lindgren – acoustic piano (7, 12), acoustic piano intro (8)
- Bob Mann – guitars (1, 5), acoustic guitars (3, 12), electric guitars (7)
- Dean Parks – electric guitars (3), guitars (6, 8, 13), mandolin (6)
- Andrew Gold – acoustic guitars (4, 10)
- Waddy Wachtel – electric guitars (4, 10), guitars (13)
- Louis Gutierrez – guitar solo (7)
- Dan Dugmore – pedal steel guitar (12)
- Jimmy Johnson – bass guitar (3, 6, 8)
- Bob Glaub – bass guitar (4, 10, 13)
- Bob Magnusson – upright bass (5)
- Leland Sklar – bass guitar (7, 12)
- Peter Asher – drum and percussion programming (3), tambourines (7, 10)
- Russ Kunkel – drums (4–8, 13)
- Nathaniel Kunkel – drums (10)
- Michael Fisher – percussion (3, 8)
- Marvin B. Gordy – percussion (3)
- Warren Ham – harmonica (4)
- Plas Johnson – tenor saxophone solo (5)
- Gavyn Wright – concertmaster (1, 2, 7, 10, 13, 14)
- Isobel Griffiths – contractor (1, 2, 7, 10, 13, 14)
- London Symphony Orchestra – orchestra (1, 2, 7, 10, 13, 14)
- The Angel Voices Choir – choir (1, 7)
- The Ambrosian Singers – choir (2, 7, 14)
- John McCarthy – choir director (2, 7, 14)
- The Lower School Chorus of Viewpoint School – choir (7)
- Robert Prizeman – boys’ choir conductor (7)
- Marcie Parker – children’s choir conductor (7)
- Donny Gerard, Raven Kane, Josef Powell, Julia Tillman Waters, Maxine Waters Willard and Oren Waters – doo-wop backing vocals (8)
- 139th Street Quartet (Doug Anderson, Dan Jordan, Jim Kline and Peter Neushul) – barbershop quartet (9)
- Jim Haas, Jon Joyce, Gene Morford and Jerry Whitman – doo-wop backing vocals (10)
- L.A. Mass Choir – choir (11)
- Donald Taylor – choir director (11)
- Raven Kane – choir contractor (8–11)

Arrangements

- David Campbell – orchestra arrangements and conductor (1, 2, 7, 10), choir arrangements and conductor (3, 4, 6, 7, 10–13), string section arrangements and conductor (5, 12, 13), BGV arrangements (8, 10), brass quartet arrangements and conductor (8), BGV conductor (8), orchestra conductor (14)
- Peter Asher – rhythm track arrangements (7, 10)
- Alan Lindgren – BGV arrangements (8), orchestra arrangements (14), choir arrangements (14)
- 139th Street Quartet – vocal arrangements (9)
- Frank Lindgren – choir arrangements (14)

== Production ==
- Peter Asher – producer
- Frank Wolf – recording, mixing
- Nathaniel Kunkel – recording assistant, mix assistant
- Brett Swain – recording assistant, mix assistant
- Chad Blinman – additional recording assistant, additional mix assistant
- Alec Marcou – additional recording assistant, additional mix assistant
- Gil Morales – additional recording assistant, additional mix assistant
- Marnie Riley – additional recording assistant, additional mix assistant
- Eric Rudd – additional recording assistant, additional mix assistant
- George Marino – mastering at Sterling Sound (New York City, New York)
- Ivy Skoff – production coordinator
- Sam Cole – project coordinator
- David Kirschner – art direction
- Jan Weinberg – design
- Eugine Adibari – cover photography
- Neil Diamond – liner notes
- Sal Bonafidi – management
- Sandy Gallin – management
- Jim Morey – management

== Charts ==
Chart (1992–1993)	Peak position
Australian Albums (ARIA)	30
Canada Top Albums/CDs (RPM)	23
UK Albums (Official Charts)	50
US Billboard 200	8

== Certifications ==
Region	Certification	Certified units/sales
Australia (ARIA)	Platinum	70,000^{^}
Canada (Music Canada)	Platinum	100,000^{^}
United States (RIAA)	2× Platinum	2,000,000^{^}
^{^} Shipments figures based on certification alone.

== See also ==
The Christmas Album, Volume II
