= All Dressed Up and No Place to Go =

Studio album by Nicolette Larson
- Released: July 1982
- Studios: Sunset Sound (Hollywood, California)
- Genre: Pop
- Length: 35:51
- Label: Warner Bros.
- Producer: Andrew Gold

Nicolette Larson chronology
Radioland (1981)	All Dressed Up and No Place to Go (1982)	...Say When (1985)

All Dressed Up and No Place to Go is the fourth studio album by American singer Nicolette Larson. It was produced by Andrew Gold and released by Warner Bros. Records in 1982.

== Background ==
All Dressed Up and No Place to Go was produced by Andrew Gold, who at the time was in a serious relationship with Larson. The pair broke up shortly after the album's recording sessions had finished. In a circa 2005 interview for Randolph Michaels's book Flashbacks to Happiness: Eighties Music Revisited, Andrew Gold recalled of the album: "She and I had a blast making the record [and] we had some great players doing the album with us. To me, the album was one of her best, yet it was somehow overlooked by many of her fans."

The album's only single was "I Only Want to Be with You", a cover of the 1963 Dusty Springfield song. Larson's version was released in July 1982 and reached No. 53 on the Billboard Hot 100. It was Larson's last appearance on the chart. All Dressed Up and No Place to Go, released in July, peaked at No. 75 on the Billboard 200. It was her final release for Warner Bros.

The album received its first release on CD, in Japan only, in 1991. Wounded Bird Records later released a remastered CD version in the US in 2005, followed by a UK release from BGO Records in 2018.

== Critical reception ==
Professional ratings
Review scores
Source	Rating
AllMusic	3/5 stars

Upon release, Billboard described the album as "more economical pop/rock" than Larson's earlier work, adding: "While she still flexes the laid-back charm of her earliest records, Larson's overall vocal attack is more urgent here. The results could restore broad radio acceptance for the singer." Cash Box felt the album was a "strong showing", with "laid-back love songs folk-rock listeners should relish". They added that the cover art acted as a "perfect metaphor for [Larson's] innocent, beguiling vocal manner".

J. D. Considine wrote in Musician: "If, like me, you believe that the lack of quality on a female vocalist's album is directly proportionate to the amount of clothing worn on the cover, be advised that on this one, Larson is wearing a towel."

In a retrospective review, Bruce Eder of AllMusic felt the album was Larson's attempt to "jump from country singer to pop diva", but "somehow it didn't take". He added: "The album isn't as strong as it might've been, and part of the problem involves the production, which mixes '80s-style electric drumming with country-pop sounds."

== Track listing ==
No.	Title	Writer(s)	Length
1.	"I'll Fly Away (Without You)"	Jackson Browne, Craig Doerge, Rosemary Butler	4:02
2.	"I Only Want to Be with You"	Mike Hawker, Ivor Raymonde	3:18
3.	"Just Say I Love You"	Andrew Kastner, Jim Lang	4:04
4.	"Nathan Jones"	Leonard Caston, Kathy Wakefield	3:07
5.	"I Want You So Bad"	Nicolette Larson, Andrew Gold	3:33
6.	"Two Trains"	Lowell George	4:14
7.	"Love, Sweet, Love"	Paul Barrere	3:53
8.	"Say You Will"	Leon Russell, Gary Ogan	3:32
9.	"Talk to Me"	Patrick Henderson, Allee Willis	3:14
10.	"Still You Linger On"	Andrew Gold	2:54

== Chart performance ==
Chart (1982)	Peak position
Australian Albums Chart	95
US Billboard 200	75

== Personnel ==
- Nicolette Larson – lead vocals, backing vocals (1–6, 8)
- Andrew Gold – acoustic piano (1, 4, 6), acoustic guitar (1), percussion (1–6, 8, 9), soloist (1), backing vocals (1–3, 5, 6, 8), electric guitar (2, 5), ARP synthesizer (3), synthesizers (4, 6–9), slide guitar (4, 6), keyboards (5), mandolin (7), harmony vocals (7), guitars (8–10)
- Mark T. Jordan – organ (1), electric piano (1, 4), keyboards (2), Rhodes electric piano (3), Wurlitzer organ (6), acoustic piano (7, 8)
- Bill Payne – synthesizers (6, 10), acoustic piano (10)
- Patrick Henderson – electric piano (9)
- Fred Tackett – electric guitar (1, 4, 6, 7), acoustic guitar (2), guitars (3)
- Andrew Kastner – guitars (3), guitar solo (3)
- John McFee – electric guitar (5)
- Richard Feldman – electric guitar (9)
- Scott Chambers – bass (1–4, 6–9)
- Bob Glaub – bass (5)
- Rick Shlosser – drums (1–4, 6–9)
- Mike Botts – drums (5)
- Arno Lucas – congas (1, 3, 6, 9), timbales (1), tambourine (7)
- Bobby LaKind – congas (4, 6, 8)
- Jim Horn – saxophone (4, 5, 9)
- Lee Thornberg – trumpet (8)
- Julia Tillman – backing vocals (4)
- Maxine Willard – backing vocals (4)
- Valerie Carter – backing vocals (5)
- Linda Ronstadt – backing vocals (8)
- Wendy Waldman – backing vocals (8)
- Maureen McDonald – backing vocals (9)

Production

- Ted Templeman – executive producer
- Andrew Gold – producer
- Jim Isaacson – engineer
- Steve McManus – second engineer
- Bobby Hata – mastering at Warner Bros. Recording Studios (North Hollywood, California)
- Jodie Lunine – production coordinator
- Jimmy Wachtel – design
- Randee St. Nicholas – photography
- Derek Sutton – management, direction
