= American Standard (Mary's Danish album) =

Studio album by Mary's Danish
- Released: 1992
- Studio: Skywalker Sound
- Genre: Rock
- Label: Morgan Creek
- Producer: Peter Asher, Niko Bolas

Mary's Danish chronology
Circa (1991)	American Standard (1992)

American Standard is the third and final album by the American band Mary's Danish, released in 1992. The band supported the album by participating in a Rock the Vote tour, following it with a tour with the Darling Buds. "Leave It Alone" peaked at No. 20 on Billboard's Modern Rock Tracks chart.

== Production ==
The album was produced primarily by Peter Asher, who also served as the band's manager. Niko Bolas engineered and assisted with the production. It was recorded in 10 days at Skywalker Sound. All six bandmembers contributed to the songwriting; the band rented a loft space in Central Los Angeles prior to the recording sessions so that they could jam. "God Said" criticizes the operations of televangelists. "Porcupine" denounces detaching oneself from society. "Gotcha Covered" is about life in Los Angeles. Chad Smith played drums on the unlisted track, a cover of "I Fought the Law" that also appeared on the soundtrack to Buffy the Vampire Slayer.

== Critical reception ==
Professional ratings
Review scores
Source	Rating
AllMusic	1.5/5 stars
Chicago Tribune	3.5/4 stars
Entertainment Weekly	D+
The Indianapolis Star	3/4 stars
Los Angeles Times	3/4 stars

The Los Angeles Times wrote that "in the key moments ... the band asserts a confident and consistent voice, shedding some of its old, distracting eclecticism in favor of a more comfortable and appealing rock 'n' roll purity." Trouser Press determined that "the album's consistency makes it more listenable, if less adventurous, with an immediacy and urgency missing from prior work." The Chicago Tribune opined that "siren singers Julie Ritter and Gretchen Seager belt out 'Leave It Alone', a speed-metal oeuvre in which guitarists Louis Gutierrez and David King fire up the grunge."

The Indianapolis Star said that "an occasional attempt toward mainstream rock, along with some overused themes, dooms a few tunes to mediocrity." Spin deemed the album "rock with that everything-but-the-kitchen-sink vibe about it." The Waterloo Region Record concluded that "Mary's Danish is probably a great alternative-singles band, but as a collection American Standard just doesn't stand up to repeated listenings."

AllMusic wrote that "the material here is substandard in comparison to the earlier releases, and Asher's '70s-slick production style simply doesn't mesh with the post-post-punk eclecticism at the heart of the band's sound."

== Track listing ==
No.	Title	Length
1.	"Killjoy"
2.	"God Said"
3.	"Underwater"
4.	"O Lonely Soul, It's a Hard Road"
5.	"Weeping Tree"
6.	"Porcupine"
7.	"Leave It Alone"
8.	"The Living End"
9.	"Ode to a Life"
10.	"My Dear Heretic"
11.	"Shotgun"
12.	"Gotcha Covered"
13.	"Sister Shade"
