= Rose of My Heart =

Studio album by Nicolette Larson
- Released: 1986
- Studio: Emerald Sound Studios (Nashville, Tennessee); The Castle (Franklin, Tennessee)
- Genre: Country
- Length: 33:09
- Label: MCA
- Producer: Emory Gordy Jr., Tony Brown

Nicolette Larson chronology
...Say When (1985)	Rose of My Heart (1986)	Shadows of Love (1988)

Singles from Rose of My Heart
- 1. "Let Me Be the First" Released: February 1986; 2. "That's How You Know When Love's Right" Released: May 1986; 3. "That's More About Love (Than I Wanted to Know)" Released: September 1986

Rose of My Heart is the sixth studio album by American singer Nicolette Larson. It was produced by Emory Gordy Jr. and Tony Brown, and released by MCA Records in 1986.

== Background ==
Rose of My Heart was Larson's second and final country album for MCA. It peaked at No. 40 on the Billboard Top Country Albums and remained on the chart for sixteen weeks. Three singles were released from the album. "Let Me Be the First" was released in February 1986 and reached No. 63 on Billboard's Hot Country Songs. "That's How You Know When Love's Right", a duet with Steve Wariner, was released in May and reached No. 9. It proved to be Larson's most successful entry on the Country Songs chart. In September, the final single, "That's More About Love (Than I Wanted to Know)", was released and reached No. 49.

In 2012, Raven Records gave the album its first CD release, as a double-album set with Larson's 1985 album ...Say When.

== Critical reception ==
Professional ratings
Review scores
Source	Rating
AllMusic	3.5/5 stars

Upon release, Billboard felt the album had a "few strays [to] keep this from being a total country album, but the songs that are country are wonderfully so". They felt some of the songs saw Larson "archive the musical purity and dramatic intensity of Emmylou Harris or Linda Ronstadt at their best". Cash Box considered the album to be "filled with strong material". They wrote: "Larson's voice suits the selections well and she does a fine job delivering."

In a retrospective review, Stephen Thomas Erlewine of AllMusic commented: "Larson's heart still seems to lie in California but that pull between mellow vibes and precision-tuned Nashville turns Rose of My Heart into a winning little record."

== Track listing ==
No.	Title	Writer(s)	Length
1.	"I Won't Give Up"	Donny Lowery, Tom Campbell	2:25
2.	"That's How You Know When Love's Right" (with Steve Wariner)	Wendy Waldman, Craig Bickhardt	3:25
3.	"If Only for One Night" (with Dave Loggins)	Dave Loggins, Steve Diamond	4:03
4.	"If I Didn't Love You"	Deborah Allen, Rafe Van Hoy	3:29
5.	"As An Eagle Stirreth Her Nest"	Rev. William Herbert Brewster	3:24
6.	"Let Me Be the First"	Kix Brooks, Deborah Allen, Rafe Van Hoy	3:55
7.	"Captured by Love"	Nicolette Larson	2:20
8.	"Rose of My Heart"	Hugh Moffatt	3:34
9.	"That's More About Love (Than I Wanted to Know)"	Dickey Lee, Bob McDill, Bucky Jones	3:46
10.	"You're Running Wild"	Ray Edenton, Don Winters	2:41

== Chart performance ==
Chart (1986)	Peak position
US Billboard Top Country Albums	40

== Personnel ==
- Nicolette Larson – lead vocals, backing vocals (3, 5, 7)
- Emory Gordy Jr. – Synclavier strings (2)
- Hollis Halford – Synclavier programming (2, 6)
- Mat Morse – Synclavier programming (2, 6)
- John Barlow Jarvis – Yamaha DX7 (3, 6–8, 10), acoustic piano (4)
- Paul Davis – Synclavier (6)
- Richard Bennett – acoustic guitars (1–4, 6–10), electric guitar solo (7)
- Larry Byrom – electric guitars (1, 2, 4, 6, 9), acoustic guitars (3, 7, 8, 10)
- Reggie Young – electric guitars
- Sonny Garrish – steel guitar (2, 4, 10)
- Russ Pahl – steel guitar (8, 9)
- David Hungate – bass
- Eddie Bayers – drums
- Farrell Morris – percussion (3, 5, 6)
- Glen Duncan – fiddle (7, 8)
- Harry Stinson – backing vocals (1, 4, 6–9)
- Mac McAnally – backing vocals (1, 4, 8)
- Steve Wariner – lead vocals (2)
- Dave Loggins – lead vocals (3)
- Vicki Hampton – backing vocals (3, 5)
- Yvonne Hodges – backing vocals (3, 5)
- Joy Jackson – backing vocals (5)
- Troy Seals – bass vocals (5)
- Deborah Allen – backing vocals (6)
- Rafe Van Hoy – backing vocals (6)
- Linda Ronstadt – harmony vocals (10)

Production

- Tony Brown – producer
- Emory Gordy Jr. – producer
- Steve Tillisch – recording, mixing
- Mark J. Coddington – second engineer
- Russ Martin – second engineer
- Keith Odle – second engineer
- Glenn Meadows – mastering at Masterfonics (Nashville, Tennessee)
- Bill Barnes – design
- Matt Barnes – design
- Simon Levy – art direction
- Barnes & Company – graphics
- Deb Mahalanobis – lettering
- Peter Nash – photography
