= Another Passenger =

Studio album by Carly Simon
- Released: June 5, 1976
- Studios: Sunset Sound, Hollywood, California
- Genre: Rock
- Length: 41:56
- Label: Elektra
- Producer: Ted Templeman

Carly Simon chronology
The Best of Carly Simon (1975)	Another Passenger (1976)	Boys in the Trees (1978)

Singles from Another Passenger
- 1. "It Keeps You Runnin'" Released: May 1976; 2. "Half a Chance" Released: August 17, 1976

Another Passenger is the sixth studio album by American singer-songwriter Carly Simon, released by Elektra Records, on June 5, 1976.

For this album, Simon enlisted a new producer, Ted Templeman, as well as his clients, The Doobie Brothers and Little Feat, to provide musical and vocal backing. On May 8, 1976, four weeks before the album was released, Simon made her first and (to date) only appearance on Saturday Night Live, performing "Half a Chance" and her signature song "You're So Vain".

== Reception and packaging ==
Professional ratings
Review scores
Source	Rating
AllMusic	3/5 stars

Another Passenger peaked at No. 29 on the Billboard Pop albums chart. The lead single "It Keeps You Runnin'" peaked at No. 46 on the Pop singles chart and No. 27 on the Adult Contemporary chart, while the second single "Half a Chance" appeared only on the Adult Contemporary chart, peaking at No. 39. Despite the lukewarm commercial reception, the album was, and remains, one of Simon's best-reviewed works. Ken Tucker, writing in Rolling Stone, called it "Carly Simon's best record", and referred to the track "Cowtown" as the "finest song she has written". He also singled out the ("loping, slick") "Half a Chance" and the ("tropical thumper") "Darkness 'Til Dawn" as "equally entertaining" tracks. AllMusic rated the album 3-out-of-5-stars, calling it "an album full of tasty licks". It has also gone on to become a favorite among many of Simon's fans.

Cash Box said of the single "Half a Chance" that "the chorus is authoritative, filled with confidence, and, as usual, her words are striking." The track "Libby" was included on Simon's 1995 three-disc box set Clouds in My Coffee, and the track "In Times When My Head" was included on Simon's 2002 two-disc career spanning collection Anthology, as well as her 2015 two-disc compilation Songs from the Trees (A Musical Memoir Collection).

Film director Terrence Malick appears on the back cover smoking at a bar.

== Track listing ==
Credits adapted from the album's liner notes.

Side one
No.	Title	Writer(s)	Length
1.	"Half a Chance"	Carly Simon; Jacob Brackman	2:55
2.	"It Keeps You Runnin'"	Michael McDonald	3:56
3.	"Fairweather Father"	Simon	3:30
4.	"Cow Town"	Simon	4:15
5.	"He Likes to Roll"	Simon	3:34
6.	"In Times When My Head"	Simon	3:27

Side two
No.	Title	Writer(s)	Length
1.	"One Love Stand"	Paul Barrere; Bill Payne; Kenny Gradney	3:27
2.	"Riverboat Gambler"	Simon; Brackman	3:53
3.	"Darkness 'Til Dawn"	Simon; Brackman	3:18
4.	"Dishonest Modesty"	Simon; Zach Wiesner	3:06
5.	"Libby"	Simon	4:42
6.	"Be with Me"	Simon; Wiesner	1:53
Total length:			41:56

== Personnel ==
=== Musicians ===
- Carly Simon – lead vocals, backing vocals (1–4, 6, 7, 9, 10), acoustic guitar (1, 10), keyboards (3), celesta (3), guitar (5), acoustic piano (6, 8), electric piano (11)
- Michael McDonald – acoustic piano (1), keyboards (2), electric piano (6, 8), backing vocals (7)
- Bill Payne – keyboards (4, 7), organ (11)
- Van Dyke Parks – acoustic and electric pianos (9), accordion (9), marimba (9), arrangements (9)
- Mark T. Jordan– acoustic piano (11)
- Nick DeCaro – accordion (12)
- Jeff Baxter – electric guitar (1), slide guitar (2), steel guitar (4)
- Andrew Gold – electric guitar (1)
- Patrick Simmons – electric guitar (1, 2)
- James Taylor – guitars (3), backing vocals (3), guitar (12)
- Tom Johnston – acoustic guitar (4)
- Paul Barrere – electric guitar (4, 7), slide guitars (10)
- Laurindo Almeida – guitar (5)
- Stephen Bruton – electric guitar (6)
- Lowell George – slide guitar (7)
- Fred Tackett – mandocellos (9)
- Dr. John – electric rhythm guitar (10)
- Glenn Frey – guitar (11)
- Tiran Porter – bass guitar (1, 2)
- Klaus Voormann – bass guitar (3, 6, 10), electric and acoustic basses (5)
- Kenny Gradney – bass guitar (4, 7)
- Bob Glaub – bass guitar (8, 11)
- John Hartman – drums (1, 2)
- Keith Knudsen – drums (1, 2)
- Richie Hayward – drums (4, 7), backing vocals (4)
- Jim Keltner – drums (5, 6)
- Rick Jaeger – drums (8, 11)
- Andy Newmark – drums (10)
- Victor Feldman – percussion (1, 5), marimba (3, 5)
- Milt Holland – percussion (3, 5, 6, 10), congas (3)
- Robert Greenidge – steel drums (9)
- Andrew Love – saxophone solo (1)
- Bud Shank – flute (5)
- David Campbell – string arrangements (1, 3, 8, 11), viola (4), woodwind arrangements (8, 11)
- Novi Novog – viola (3, 4)
- Kirby Johnson – string arrangements (6)
- Ellen Kearney – backing vocals (1, 6)
- Leah Kunkel – backing vocals (1, 6)
- Linda Ronstadt – backing vocals (1, 6)
- The Doobie Brothers – backing vocals (2)
- Jackson Browne – backing vocals (3)
- Libby Titus – backing vocals (6)
- Lucy Simon – backing vocals (9)
- Alex Taylor – backing vocals (10)

=== Production ===
- Producer – Ted Templeman
- Engineer – Donn Landee
- Art Direction – Glen Christensen
- Design – Anne Gardner
- Photography – Mary Ellen Mark
- Management – Arlyne Rothberg, Inc.

== Charts ==
Chart (1976)	Peak position
Australian Albums (Kent Music Report)	44
Canada Top Albums/CDs (RPM)	44
US Billboard 200	29
US Cash Box Top 100 Albums	21
