= In the Nick of Time (album) =

Studio album by Nicolette Larson
- Released: 1979
- Studio: Warner Bros., Los Angeles, California
- Genre: Soft rock
- Length: 34:08
- Label: Warner Bros.
- Producer: Ted Templeman

Nicolette Larson chronology
Nicolette (1978)	In the Nick of Time (1979)	Radioland (1981)

In the Nick of Time is the second album by Nicolette Larson. It features a duet with Michael McDonald, keyboards from Bill Payne, backing vocals from Bobby LaKind and Rosemary Butler, Ronnie Montrose and Eddie Van Halen (uncredited) on guitar and other collaborators. Larson had a minor hit with her McDonald duet, "Let Me Go, Love".

Professional ratings
Review scores
Source	Rating
AllMusic	3/5 stars
Record Mirror	4/5 stars

== Track listing ==
1. "Dancin' Jones" (Jerry Leiber, Mike Stoller, John Sembello, Ralph Dino) – 3:18
2. "Just in the Nick of Time" (Nicolette Larson, Ted Templeman, Lauren Wood) – 3:24
3. "Let Me Go, Love" (Michael McDonald, B.J. Cook Foster) – 3:49
4. "Rio de Janeiro Blue" (Richard Torrance, John Haeny) – 3:50
5. "Breaking Too Many Hearts" (Lauren Wood) – 3:33
6. "Back in My Arms" (Brian Holland, Eddie Holland, Lamont Dozier) – 3:51
7. "Fallen" (Lauren Wood) – 3:23
8. "Daddy" (Bobby Troup) – 3:23
9. "Isn't It Always Love" (Karla Bonoff) – 3:06
10. "Trouble" (Lowell George) – 2:31

== Charts ==
Chart (1979)	Peak position
Australia (Kent Music Report)	35

== Personnel ==
- Nicolette Larson – lead vocals, backing vocals
- Michael Omartian – keyboards (1, 7)
- Bill Payne – keyboards (2–5, 9)
- Paul Barrere – guitars (1, 2, 4–9), guitarlele (3)
- Bob Glaub – bass (1–9)
- Rick Shlosser – drums (1–9)
- Ted Templeman – percussion (1–9), backing vocals (1, 2, 4, 7, 8), keyboards (6)
- Bobby LaKind – congas (1–9), backing vocals (6)

Additional musicians

- Michael McDonald – lead vocals (3), keyboards (6)
- Van Dyke Parks – keyboards (10)
- Fred Tackett – guitars (1)
- Ronnie Montrose – guitar solo (2)
- Victor Feldman – marimba (9)
- The Memphis Horns – horns (1, 4)
- Jim Horn – saxophone solo (1, 5, 6)
- Jerry Hey – flugelhorn (4)
- Ben Cauley – flugelhorn (4)
- Lee Thornburg – trumpet solo (8)
- Jimmie Haskell – string arrangements (3–7, 9), horn arrangements (3, 6, 9)
- Jerry Jumonville – horn arrangements (5, 8)
- Tom Johnston – backing vocals (1)
- Rosemary Butler – backing vocals (5, 6)
- Charra Penney – backing vocals (5, 8)

Production

- Ted Templeman – producer
- Donn Landee – engineer
- Ken Deane – engineer
- Loyd Clifft – additional engineer
- Gene Thompson – mastering at Capitol Mastering (Hollywood, California)
- Susyn Schops – production coordinator
- Peter Whorf – art direction, design
- Joel Bernstein – photography
- Josephine Larson – title concept
