= The Christmas Album, Volume II =

Studio album by Neil Diamond
- Released: October 11, 1994
- Studio: Arch Angel Studios (Los Angeles, California); Conway Studios (Hollywood, California); Angel Recording Studios (London, England, UK)
- Genre: Christmas
- Length: 50:11
- Label: Columbia
- Producer: Peter Asher

Neil Diamond chronology
Live in America (1994)	The Christmas Album, Volume II (1994)	Tennessee Moon (1996)

Professional ratings
Review scores
Source	Rating
Allmusic	3/5 stars

The Christmas Album, Volume II is the twenty-second studio album by Neil Diamond, and his second to feature Christmas music. It was produced by Peter Asher and released by Columbia Records in 1994, only two years after Diamond's previous Christmas album. It features orchestral and choir arrangements by David Campbell, who also worked on the first Christmas album, as well as several of Diamond's other works. The album reached number 9 on the Billboard Holiday Album chart and was certified as gold by the RIAA on December 6, 1994.

== Track listing ==
No.	Title	Writer(s)	Length
1.	"Joy to the World"	Traditional	2:40
2.	"Mary's Little Boy Child"	Jester Hairston	2:59
3.	"Deck the Halls" / "We Wish You a Merry Christmas"	Traditional	1:42
4.	"Winter Wonderland"	Felix Bernard, Richard B. Smith	2:44
5.	"Have Yourself a Merry Little Christmas"	Ralph Blane, Hugh Martin	4:43
6.	"I'll Be Home for Christmas"	Kim Gannon, Walter Kent, Buck Ram	3:43
7.	"Rudolph the Red-Nosed Reindeer"	Johnny Marks	4:04
8.	"Sleigh Ride"	Leroy Anderson	2:42
9.	"Candlelight Carol"	John Rutter	4:09
10.	"Away in a Manger"	Traditional	2:33
11.	"O Come All Ye Faithful"	Traditional	4:15
12.	"O Little Town of Bethlehem"	Traditional	3:35
13.	"Angels We Have Heard on High"	Traditional	3:17
14.	"The First Noel"	Traditional	3:34
15.	"Hallelujah Chorus"	G. F. Handel	3:31

== Personnel ==
Musicians and vocalists

- Neil Diamond – vocals
- Robbie Buchanan – acoustic piano (1, 12), keyboards (11, 13, 15), percussion (13), harmonium (14)
- Bill Payne – Hammond B3 organ (4, 7)
- Tom Hensley – acoustic piano (5, 6)
- Alan Lindgren – acoustic piano (9)
- Brian Mann – accordion (10)
- Bob Mann – guitars (1, 2, 4, 5, 7, 8, 11), acoustic guitar (10)
- Waddy Wachtel – guitars (1, 4, 7), acoustic guitar (10)
- Michael Thompson – guitars (15)
- Kenny Blackwell – mandolin (10)
- Carl Smith – lute (14)
- Jimmy Johnson – bass (1, 4, 7, 15)
- Bob Magnusson – bass (2, 5, 6, 8, 10)
- Carlos Vega – drums (1, 4–7, 15), percussion (7)
- Peter Asher – percussion (2, 7, 8, 11)
- Vince Charles – steel drums (2)
- Alan Estes – marimba (5), vibraphone (6)
- M.B. Gordy – vibraphone (8), percussion (13, 14), timpani (15)
- Jon Clarke – woodwinds (2), flutes (14), recorders (14)
- Tommy Morgan – harmonica (6)
- Valerie Carter – backing vocals (2)
- Kate Markowitz – backing vocals (2, 4, 7)
- Laura Satterfield – backing vocals (2)
- Raven Kane – backing vocals (4, 7), vocal contractor
- Stephanie Spruill – backing vocals (4, 7)
- Julia Tillman Waters – backing vocals (4, 7)
- Maxine Waters Willard – backing vocals (4, 7)
- Oren Waters – backing vocals (4, 7)
- Wendy Fraser – backing vocals (7)
- Andrea Robinson – backing vocals (7)
- Herb Pedersen – backing vocals (10)

Choirs

- The Soul Children of Chicago – choir (1)
- 139th Street Quartet – barbershop choir (3)
- Victoria Asher, Perrie Briskin, Anjuli Cain, Alyssa Campbell, Erika Christensen, Milena Ferreria, Kelyn Huppard, Jacob King, Evan Payne, Ashley Powell and Sara Seider – children's backing vocals (7)
- The Ambrosian Singers – choir (9, 11–15)
- John McCarthy – choirmaster for Ambrosian Singers (9, 11–15)
- The Angel Voices – boys choir (9, 11, 13, 14)
- Robert Prizeman – choir conductor for Angel Voices (9, 11, 13, 14)

Arrangements

- David Campbell – arrangements (1–4, 7, 8, 10–15), brass conductor (1), horn section conductor (4, 7), orchestra conductor (5, 6, 8, 9, 11–15), choir conductor for Ambrosian Singers (9, 11–15)
- Walter Whitman – arrangements (1), brass conductor (1), choir conductor (1)
- Tom Hensley – arrangements (5, 6), horn section conductor (5, 6)
- Alan Lindgren – arrangements (5, 6, 9), horn section conductor (5, 6)

== Production ==
- Peter Asher – producer
- Frank Wolf – recording, mixing
- Bernie Becker – additional engineer
- Julie Last – additional engineer
- Kristin Cowie – assistant engineer
- Sean O’Dwyer – assistant engineer
- John Radzin – assistant engineer
- Marnie Riley – assistant engineer
- Doug Sax – mastering at The Mastering Lab (Hollywood, California)
- Cathy Kerr – production assistant
- Ivy Skoff – production coordinator
- Sam Cole – project coordinator
- Isobel Griffiths – London booker
- David Kirschner – art direction
- Gabrielle Raumberger – design
- Dylan Tran – design
- Mauro Carerro – photography
- David Skernick – background photography

== Charts ==
Chart (1994)	Peak position
US Billboard 200	51

== Certifications ==
Region	Certification	Certified units/sales
United States (RIAA)	Gold	500,000^{^}
^{^} Shipments figures based on certification alone.

== See also ==
The Christmas Album
