= Live in America (Neil Diamond album) =

Live album by Neil Diamond
- Released: June 28, 1994
- Recorded: February 18, 1992–December, 1993
- Genre: Pop, rock
- Length: 122:45
- Label: Columbia
- Producer: Neil Diamond

Neil Diamond chronology
Up on the Roof: Songs from the Brill Building (1993)	Live in America (1994)	The Christmas Album, Volume II (1994)

Professional ratings
Review scores
Source	Rating
Allmusic	3/5 stars

Live in America is a two-disc live album by Neil Diamond released by Columbia Records in the summer of 1994. It reached number 93 on the Billboard 200 chart. As with his previous live albums Hot August Night and Hot August Night II Diamond performed his old hits with his version of his 1968 song "Red Red Wine" rendered in a reggae style similar to the version done by UB40.

== Reception ==
In his review of the album music critic Stephen Thomas Erlewine states that Diamond "gives one hell of a show".

== Track listing ==
All songs written by Neil Diamond, except where noted.

Disc one
No.	Title	Writer(s)	Length
1.	"America"		4:18
2.	"Hello Again"	Diamond, Alan Lindgren	3:57
3.	"Kentucky Woman"		2:26
4.	"You Got to Me"		2:41
5.	"Cherry, Cherry"		3:13
6.	"I'm a Believer"		3:08
7.	"Sweet Caroline"		4:07
8.	"Love on the Rocks"	Gilbert Bécaud, Diamond	3:48
9.	"Hooked on the Memory of You" (featuring Linda Press)		3:12
10.	"Lady Oh"		3:53
11.	"Beautiful Noise"		3:36
12.	"Play Me"		4:21
13.	"Up on the Roof"	Gerry Goffin, Carole King	3:41
14.	"You've Lost That Lovin' Feelin'" (featuring Raven Kane)	Barry Mann, Phil Spector, Cynthia Weil	4:26
15.	"River Deep - Mountain High"	Jeff Barry, Ellie Greenwich, Phil Spector	3:57
16.	"I (Who Have Nothing)"	Carlo Donida, Mogol, Jerry Leiber, Mike Stoller	3:52
Total length:			58:36

Disc two
No.	Title	Writer(s)	Length
1.	"Missa" (featuring Craig Copeland, Raven Kane, Joseph Powell, Julia Waters, Maxine Willard Waters, Oren Waters)		2:37
2.	"Soolaimon"		4:38
3.	"Holly Holy"		3:53
4.	"And the Grass Won't Pay No Mind"		4:29
5.	"You Don't Bring Me Flowers" (featuring Raven Kane)	Alan Bergman, Marilyn Bergman, Diamond	5:11
6.	"September Morn'"	Bécaud, Diamond	4:07
7.	"Havah Nagila"	Traditional	3:32
8.	"Solitary Man"		3:18
9.	"Red Red Wine"		3:10
10.	"Song Sung Blue"		3:18
11.	"Forever in Blue Jeans"	Richard Bennett, Diamond	3:20
12.	"Heartlight"	Burt Bacharach, Diamond, Carole Bayer Sager	3:49
13.	"Cracklin' Rosie"		3:04
14.	"I Am... I Said"		5:40
15.	"Crunchy Granola Suite"		3:46
16.	"Brother Love's Travelling Salvation Show"		6:17
Total length:			64:09

== Personnel ==
- Neil Diamond - vocals, acoustic guitar
- Doug Rhone, Hadley Hockensmith - guitar
- Jesse Diamond - acoustic guitar
- Reinie Press - bass
- Alan Lindgren, Tom Hensley - keyboards
- Ron Tutt - drums
- Vince Charles - percussion
- King Errisson - congas
- Don Markese - saxophone, flute, clarinet
- Larry Klimas - saxophone, flute
- Ralf Rickert - trumpet, flugelhorn
- Arturo Velasco - trombone
- Craig Copeland, Josef Powell, Julia Waters, Maxine Waters, Oren Waters, Raven Kane - singers
- Linda Press - backing vocals
