= American Girl (album) =

Studio album by Juice Newton
- Released: October 12, 1999
- Recorded: May 23, 1991 – July 29, 1999
- Genre: Country rock
- Length: 39:04
- Label: Renaissance
- Producer: Richard Landis

Juice Newton chronology
| The Trouble with Angels (1997) | American Girl (1999) | Every Road Leads Back to You (2002) |

Professional ratings
Review scores
| Source | Rating |
|---|---|
| AllMusic | 4/5 stars |

"Nightime Without You"
Although known primary as a country rock and popsinger, Juice Newton showed her versatility by writing and singing this big band swing-style number.

American Girl is the eleventh solo studio album by country pop singer Juice Newton It was released by Renaissance Records in 1999. Following the release of her 1989 album Ain't Gonna Cry, Newton had concentrated largely on concert performing until the release of The Trouble With Angels in 1998. However, that album was made up largely of new renditions of songs she had recorded in the past. Thus American Girl marked her first recording of original material in twelve years.

== Overview ==
Juice Newton began her recording career in 1975 but did not achieve major stardom until the release of her 1981 album Juice. The album was a crossover success and yielded three hit singles, "Angel of the Morning", "Queen of Hearts", and "The Sweetest Thing (I've Ever Known)". The last of these peaked at number one on the Billboard Country Chart. She followed Juice with Quiet Lies (1982), an album that brought her more hits, including "Love's Been a Little Bit Hard on Me" and "Break It to Me Gently", of which the latter earned her the Grammy Award for Best Country Vocal Performance, Female. Newton's 1985 album Old Flame was her country breakthrough, spawning three number one hits "You Make Me Want to Make You Mine", "Hurt", and the duet with Eddie Rabbitt "Both to Each Other (Friends & Lovers)" and also three additional Top Ten hits: "Old Flame", "Cheap Love", and "What Can I Do with My Heart". After two more albums (Emotion and Ain't Gonna Cry) Newton concentrated more on concert performing.

Newton's albums Juice, Quiet Lies, Dirty Looks, and Old Flame had all been produced by Richard Landis. In 1997 Newton reunited with him for The Trouble With Angels, an album made up largely of new renditions of her earlier recordings. American Girl was released by Renaissance Records on October 12, 1999, and was made up of twelve songs recorded over a period of eight years (May 23, 1991 - July 29, 1999). In discussing the album and her career Newton stated:

I took quite a risk pulling back my career to concentrate on my family, but I've done some other things, book narration, and learned quite a bit about that. I've written some stories and with dot.com I may just put those out myself. Might as well. We have a great web page. [Doing this album was] quite an adventure. There's quite a variety of music on it. But I've always been that kind of artist, and there are pluses and minuses to that. But that's what I do.

Of the album's twelve songs, "Red Blooded American Girl" and the title track were reused from The Trouble With Angels. The rest were previously unreleased and new recordings. The only single released was "They Never Made It To Memphis". The album featured a big band swing-style number, "Nightime Without You", that Newton wrote. Among the remaining tracks were cover versions of Nanci Griffith's "Listen to the Radio", Everly Brothers' "Love Hurts", Queen's "Crazy Little Thing Called Love", and Buck Owens' "There Goes My Love". Also included was Tom Petty's "Keepin' Me Alive", which had not been released prior to Newton's version.

In her review of American Girl music critic Charlotte Dillon states:

On this album Juice Newton steps out with some new material for the first time in a number of years. Newton's husky voice puts an original touch to each tune, sure to please both new and old fans. An album worth having.

== Track listing ==
| No. | Title | Writer(s) | Length |
|---|---|---|---|
| 1. | "Ask Lucinda" | Johnny Pierce, Otha Young | 2:48 |
| 2. | "Listen to the Radio" | Nanci Griffith | 3:03 |
| 3. | "Love Hurts" | Boudleaux Bryant | 4:01 |
| 4. | "They Never Made It to Memphis" | Jan Buckingham, Karen Staley | 2:49 |
| 5. | "Keepin' Me Alive" | Tom Petty | 3:21 |
| 6. | "I've Been Mistreated" | W. Jay Crawley | 3:03 |
| 7. | "Crazy Little Thing Called Love" | Freddie Mercury | 2:43 |
| 8. | "Nightime Without You" | Juice Newton | 2:35 |
| 9. | "The Trouble With Angels" | Terry Wilson | 3:55 |
| 10. | "Red Blooded American Girl" | Lawrence Gottlieb, Kevin Montgomery | 5:00 |
| 11. | "There Goes My Love" | Buck Owens | 2:42 |
| 12. | "You Can't Say You Don't Love Me Anymore" | John Jarvis, Bill Lamb | 3:04 |

== Personnel ==
- Juice Newton – vocals
- Eddie Bayers – drums
- Chris Brooks – drums
- Steve Duncan – drums
- Milton Sledge – drums
- Harry Stinson – drums
- Jimmy Nichols – drums, keyboards, synthesizer
- Rick Shlosser – drums, percussion
- Aubry Hayne – fiddle
- Rob Hojacos – fiddle
- Nat Wyner – fiddle
- James Lowry – acoustic guitar
- Jeff King – acoustic & electric guitar
- Steve Cochran – acoustic & electric guitar, background vocals
- Otha Young – acoustic guitar, background vocals
- Dennis Belfield – bass guitar
- Spady Brannan – bass guitar
- David Hungate – bass guitar
- Jay Bodean Cawley – bass guitar, background vocals
- Joe DiBlasi – electric guitar
- John Jorgenson – electric guitar
- Jerry Kimbrough – electric guitar
- Kerry Marx – electric guitar
- Doug Livingston – steel guitar
- Andre Mayeaux – keyboards, synthesizer
- Skip Edwards – keyboards, synthesizer
- Bobby Ogdin – keyboards, synthesizer
- Jay Dee Mannes – pedal steel guitar
- Terry McMillan – percussion
- John McKay, Dina Bennet, Steve McClintock, John Wesley Riles, Lisa Silver, Diane Tidwell, Dennis Wilson, Curtis Young – background vocals
