= Circa (Mary's Danish album) =

Studio album by Mary's Danish
- Released: 1991
- Genre: Rock
- Label: Morgan Creek
- Producer: Dave Jerden, Mary's Danish

Mary's Danish chronology
Experience (Live + Foxey Lady) (1989)	Circa (1991)	American Standard (1992)

Circa is the second album by the American band Mary's Danish, released in 1991. "Julie's Blanket (Pigsheadsnakeface)" peaked at No. 14 on Billboard's Modern Rock Tracks chart. Mary's Danish supported the album with a North American tour. Circa was a commercial disappointment that almost led to the breakup of the band.

== Production ==
The album was produced by Dave Jerden and the band. Most of its songs were written by Gretchen Seager and Julie Ritter, who were primarily inspired by Joni Mitchell, Peter, Paul and Mary, and X. Many of the songs describe the physical and emotional conflicts experienced by women. "Axl Rose Is Love" was written in response to Guns N' Roses' "One in a Million", although, Mary's Danish was a fan of the band's music. "Julie's Blanket (Pigsheadsnakeface)" is about the aftermath of a sexual encounter. "Foxey Lady" is a cover of the Jimi Hendrix Experience song. Due to legal issues with their previous label, the album release was delayed by around a year. The band later regretted the musical diversity of the album's songs and sound.

== Critical reception ==
Professional ratings
Review scores
Source	Rating
AllMusic	4/5 stars
Alternative Rock	3/10
The Arizona Republic	4/5 stars
Robert Christgau	C+
Dayton Daily News	4/4 stars
Los Angeles Times	3.5/5 stars
The Philadelphia Inquirer	3/4 stars

Spin called the album "pop music with ambition—art rock with an unforced feminist agenda." The Los Angeles Times said that "the music shifts between richly evocative and aggressively cathartic-sometimes funky, sometimes punky, once or twice country-tinged, but all seemingly cut from the same cloth." The Indianapolis Star noted that the band "tries to be too many things to too many people... Straight-ahead pop-rock tunes like 'Hoof', 'Louisiana', 'Hellflower' and 'Down' fare the best. When the band is focused and locked into a three-minute format, it sounds good."

The Washington Post dismissed the songs as "so repetitious that it's amazing that their producers didn't suggest dropping at least a few of the 17 tracks." The Chicago Sun-Times said that "Mary's Danish takes a stew of sounds, adds current lyrics and creates songs that are memorable for both their intensity and poignancy." Robert Christgau opined that they may "play their instruments ... [but] they can't play their influences." The Arizona Republic labeled the band "the missing link between 1968 and 1991".

== Track listing ==
No.	Title	Length
1.	"Yellow Creep Around"
2.	"Julie's Blanket (Pigsheadsnakeface)"
3.	"Beat Me Up"
4.	"Louisiana"
5.	"Mr. Floosack"
6.	"Hoof"
7.	"Tracy in the Bathroom Killing Thrills"
8.	"Abalone Blues"
9.	"7 Deadly Sins"
10.	"Bombshell"
11.	"Foxey Lady"
12.	"Down"
13.	"These Are All the Shapes Nevada Could Have Been"
14.	"Venus Loves Leonard"
15.	"Hellflower"
16.	"Axl Rose Is Love"
17.	"Cover Your Face"
