= Lauren Wood =

American singer-songwriter

Lauren Wood (born Ilene Rappaport in Pittsburgh, Pennsylvania), also known as Chunky, is an American singer-songwriter, voice-over artist, and producer. Her 1981 single "Fallen" from the album Cat Trick was used in the 1990 movie Pretty Woman. In 1979, she recorded "Please Don't Leave", a duet with singer Michael McDonald.

== Biography ==
Wood's career began in the mid-1960s when she formed a band called Rebecca and the Sunnybrook Farmers. In 1972, she provided back-up vocals on Frank Zappa's album The Grand Wazoo. In 1973, Wood formed the band Chunky, Novi & Ernie with her cousin Novi Novog and bassist Ernie Eremita (died 15 April 2018). They released two albums both co-produced by Ted Templeman and John Cale. "Underground", from the 1973 album was covered by Montrose on Paper Money (1974). Frank Zappa can be heard speaking at the beginning of "Rosalie".

In 1979, she released her first self-titled album, Lauren Wood on Warner Bros. Records. Although a solo album, the words "Featuring Novi and Ernie" appear in the lower right corner of the cover and the photo has Wood flanked by her bandmates. Guests included Michael McDonald, Little Feat members Bill Payne and Fred Tackett, Steve Lukather, Ronnie Montrose, Jim Keltner, and Patrick Simmons. The duet "Please Don't Leave" went to No. 5 on Billboard's Adult Contemporary chart and No. 24 on the Billboard Hot 100.

She has also written Top 20 hits for Gladys Knight and Philip Bailey, as well as songs for Cher, Dusty Springfield, Johnny Mathis, Sammy (Van Halen) Hagar, Animotion, Larry Coryell, Warren Hill, Leo Sayer, Billy Preston, Nicolette Larson, Tiffany, Albert Hammond, and Presuntos Implicados. Rita Coolidge performed Wood's song, "Echo My Heart" for Farm Aid. Wood's songs have appeared in numerous films and television shows including Police Academy 3: Back in Training and Just Shoot Me!

After her follow-up album, Cat Trick, Wood vanished from the music scene. However, she spent time writing and performing songs for television and movie soundtracks, including "Fallen", the song used in Pretty Woman, which has been covered by musicians such as Johnny Mathis and Larry Coryell. The song was first recorded by Nicolette Larson, followed by Wood for Cat Trick. Larson would later record two more songs written by Wood for her 1988 album Shadows of Love: "Work on It" and "Where Did I Get These Tears".

In 1997, Wood founded her own record label, Bad Art Records. On this label, she released her third album, also titled Lauren Wood, in 1997 and Love, Death & Customer Service in 2006. Her songs there feature artists and musicians including Stephen Bishop, Bill Payne (Little Feat), Melissa Manchester, and Vicki Randle (The Tonight Show Band). Her second self-titled album was first distributed in Japan under license from Bad Art.

Her two Warner Records albums, Lauren Wood and Cat Trick, have been remastered and re-released as one CD called The Warner Brothers Years; this edition was released in 2020.

In addition to her original recordings, Wood's distinctive voice can be heard singing lead on the theme song of NBC's hit series Just Shoot Me!, as well as many national commercials including Nike, Budweiser, and Nintendo. She has also appeared as a background vocalist for Devo, The Doobie Brothers, Kim Carnes, and Frank Zappa, and on commercials for Oldsmobile, 7 Up, and Cadillac. She has recorded voice-over for animation and music for film and TV including Rugrats, Jackie Chan Adventures, The Tigger Movie, and The Little Mermaid II: Return to the Sea, and she has appeared on a number of TV shows including The Roseanne Show and Entertainment Tonight.

== Discography ==
=== Albums (with band) ===
- Chunky, Novi & Ernie (1973)
- Chunky, Novi & Ernie (1977)

=== Solo albums ===
- Lauren Wood (1979)
- Cat Trick (1981)
- Lauren Wood (1997)
- Love, Death & Customer Service (2006)
- The Warner Brothers Years (2020) - Re-release of Lauren Wood and Cat Trick

=== Singles ===
- "Please Don't Leave" (1979)
- "Fallen" (1981)
- "Contradictions" (2007)

== Song appearances ==
- Extras (2005) ("Fallen")
- Return to Never Land (2002) ("So to Be One of Us")
- The Little Mermaid II: Return to the Sea (2000) (V) ("Here on the Land and Sea")
- The Tigger Movie (2000) ("The Wonderful Thing about Tiggers", "Someone Like Me Lullabee", "The Whoop-de-Dooper-Bounce", "Pooh's Lullabee", "Round My Family Tree", "How to Be a Tigger")
- Just Shoot Me! (1997–2003) ("Life Keeps Bringin' Me Back to You")
- Pretty Woman (1990) ("Fallen")
- Mamma Mia! (2008) ("Mamma Mia", "Dancing Queen", "Super Trouper", "SOS", "Take a Chance on Me")
- Police Academy 3: Back in Training (1986) ("Wounded in Love")

== Covers of "Fallen" ==
- In 1979, Nicolette Larson recorded the song for her album In the Nick of Time.
- In 1983, Nicole Wills recorded the song as "Fallin'" for her album Tell Me.
- In 1988, Johnny Mathis recorded the song for his album Once in a While.
- In 1991 and 1992, Hong Kong singers Elizabeth Lee and Cass Phang covered "Fallen" in Cantonese.
- In 1993, guitarist Larry Coryell recorded "Fallen" for his album Fallen Angel.
- In 1995, Spanish band Presuntos Implicados and American soul-jazz vocalist Randy Crawford recorded a duet, mixing verses in Spanish and English, for the album La Noche.
- In 2002, saxophonist Warren Hill covered the song on his album Love Songs.

== See also ==
- List of 1970s one-hit wonders in the United States
