= Bill Payne =

American pianist (born 1949)

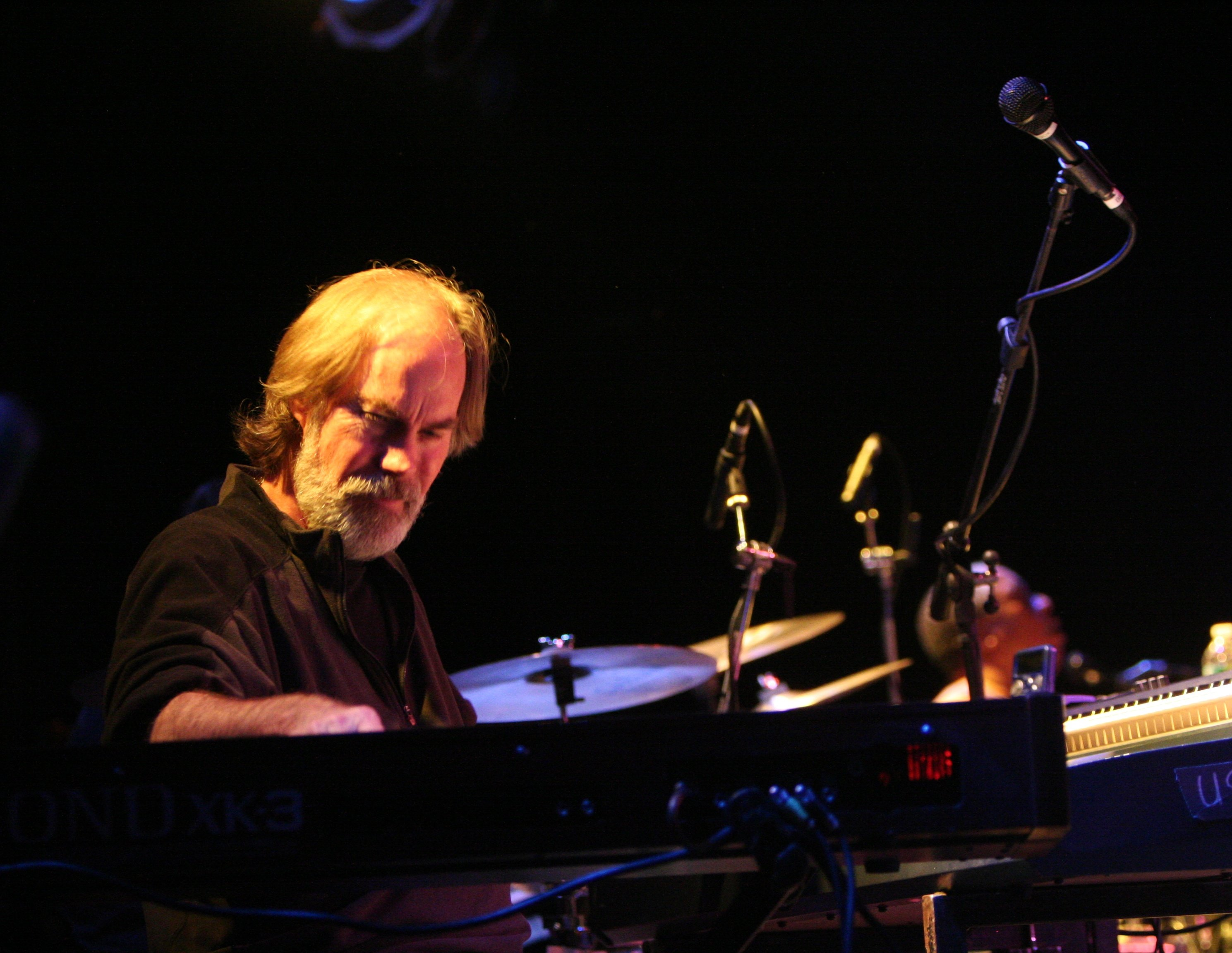
- Payne performing with Little Feat at a benefit for Richie Hayward in 2010

Background information
- Born: William H. Payne; March 12, 1949 (age 77); Waco, Texas, U.S.
- Genres: Rock; roots rock; blues rock; swamp rock; jam band; boogie rock
- Occupations: Musician; songwriter; record producer
- Instruments: Vocals; keyboards
- Years active: 1969–present
- Label: Hot Tomato
- Member of: Little Feat
- Formerly of: Phil Lesh and Friends; Leftover Salmon; The Doobie Brothers
- Website: billpaynecreative.com

William H. Payne (born March 12, 1949) is an American pianist who, with Lowell George, co-founded the American rock band Little Feat. He is considered by many other rock pianists, including Elton John, to be one of the finest American piano rock and blues musicians. In addition to his trademark barrelhouse blues piano, he is noted for his work on the Hammond B3 organ. Payne is an accomplished songwriter whose credits include "Oh, Atlanta". Payne is the sole living original member of Little Feat as of 2025.

Payne has worked and recorded with J. J. Cale, Jimmy Buffett, Doobie Brothers, Emmylou Harris, Bryan Adams, Pink Floyd, Bob Seger, Toto, Linda Ronstadt, Jackson Browne, Carly Simon, James Taylor, Bonnie Raitt, Helen Watson, Stevie Nicks, Robert Palmer, Richard Torrance, Tommy Emmanuel, Stephen Bruton, and Shocking Edison. He was a guest performer on Bonnie Raitt's album Sweet Forgiveness in 1977, and wrote its track, "Takin' My Time."

Paul Barrere and Bill Payne played several live concerts with Phil Lesh and Friends, from October 1999 through July 2000. Payne was a member of Boulder band Leftover Salmon from 2014 until December 2015.

In August 2015, Payne was selected to play keyboards for The Doobie Brothers after their keyboardist Guy Allison was called to work on an album project in Japan. However, in December 2015 Payne rejoined the Doobies as a touring member, officially taking the position previously held by Allison. In the few weeks of touring with the Doobies, he was featured with the band and Michael McDonald on The Tonight Show Starring Jimmy Fallon. Payne's temporary term ended in early September after the Doobies' concert at the BB&T Pavilion in Camden, New Jersey.

== Other work ==
Payne was a pioneer in the development of online music communities. In the early 1990s, he contacted his fan base and enlisted the help of friend Jay Herbst to develop the Little Feat Grass-roots Movement. This model went on to be a template for many bands in the creation of their Street Teams, which enlist the help of fans for purposes of music and concert promotion. This method has proven to be an effective vehicle for bringing bands and fans closer together, and forging friendships between them.

Payne now also works as a commercial photographer.

== Songwriting (selected) ==
Payne wrote or co-wrote many of the songs in Little Feat's catalogue, including the following:

- "Snakes on Everything"
- "Strawberry Flats"
- "Truck-Stop Girl"
- "Brides of Jesus"
- "Tripe Face Boogie"
- "Got No Shadow"
- "Oh, Atlanta"
- "Somebody's Leavin'"
- "Time Loves a Hero"
- "Gringo"
- "Takin' My Time"
- "Red Streamliner"
- "All That You Dream"

== Discography ==
=== Solo ===
- Cielo Norte (2005)

== Collaborations ==
With Bonnie Raitt

- Takin' My Time (Warner Bros. Records, 1973)
- Home Plate (Warner Bros. Records, 1975)
- Sweet Forgiveness (Warner Bros. Records, 1977)
- The Glow (Warner Bros. Records, 1979)
- Nine Lives (Warner Bros. Records, 1986)

With Shigeru Suzuki

- Band Wagon (Panam/Crown, 1975)

With Robert Palmer

- Pressure Drop (Island Records, 1975)
- Some People Can Do What They Like (Island Records, 1976)
- Double Fun (Island Records, 1978)

With J. J. Cale

- Shades (Island Records, 1981)
- Closer to You (Virgin Records, 1994)

With Brian Cadd

- White on White (Capitol Records, 1976)

With Stephen Bishop

- Bish (ABC Records, 1978)

With Jimmy Barnes

- For the Working Class Man (Mushroom Records, 1985)

With Harry Nilsson

- Flash Harry (Mercury Records, 1980)

With Jackson Browne

- For Everyman (Asylum Records, 1973)
- The Pretender (Asylum Records, 1976)
- Hold Out (Asylum Records, 1980)
- Lawyers in Love (Asylum Records, 1983)
- Lives in the Balance (Asylum Records, 1986)

With Curtis Stigers

- Curtis Stigers (Arista Records, 1991)

With Steve Harley

- Hobo with a Grin (EMI, 1978)

With Emmylou Harris

- Elite Hotel (Reprise Records, 1975)
- Pieces of the Sky (Reprise Records, 1975)
- Blue Kentucky Girl (Warner Bros. Records, 1979)
- Evangeline (Warner Bros. Records, 1981)
- White Shoes (Warner Bros. Records, 1983)
- All I Intended to Be (Nonesuch Records, 2008)

With Janis Ian

- Restless Eyes (Columbia Records, 1981)

With James Reyne

- James Reyne (Capitol Records, 1987)
- The Whiff of Bedlam (RooArt, 1994)

With Rod Stewart

- Out of Order (Warner Bros. Records, 1988)

With Gail Davies

- Givin' Herself Away (Warner Bros. Records, 1982)
- What Can I Say (Warner Bros. Records, 1983)
- Where Is a Woman to Go (RCA Records, 1984)

With Steve Cropper

- Playin' My Thang (MCA Records, 1981)

With Jeffrey Osborne

- Emotional (A&M Records, 1986)

With Michael Martin Murphey

- Lone Wolf (Epic Records, 1978)

With Dolly Parton, Emmylou Harris and Linda Ronstadt

- Trio (Warner Bros, Records, 1987)

With Gregg Allman Band

- Playin' Up a Storm (Capricorn Records, 1977)

With Jude Cole

- Start the Car (Reprise Records, 1992)

With Diana DeGarmo

- Blue Skies (RCA Records, 2004)

With Bob Seger

- Against the Wind (Capitol Records, 1980)
- The Distance (Capitol Records, 1982)
- Like a Rock (Capitol Records, 1986)
- The Fire Inside (Capitol Records, 1991)
- It's a Mystery (Capitol Records, 1995)
- Face the Promise (Capitol Records, 2006)
- I Knew You When (Capitol Records, 2017)

With Colin James

- Colin James (Virgin Records, 1988)

With Melanie

- Seventh Wave (Neighbourhood Records, 1983)

With B.B. King

- Deuces Wild (MCA Records, 1997)

With Bryan Adams

- Waking Up the Neighbours (A&M Records, 1991)

With Stevie Nicks

- Bella Donna (Atco Records, 1981)
- Rock a Little (Modern Records, 1985)

With Cher

- Cher (Geffen, 1987)

With Shannon McNally

- Jukebox Sparrows (Capitol Records, 2002)

With Jimmy Buffett

- License to Chill (RCA Records, 2004)
- Take the Weather with You (RCA Records, 2006)

With Shawn Colvin

- Fat City (Columbia Records, 1992)

With Carly Simon

- No Secrets (Elektra Records, 1972)
- Another Passenger (Elektra Records, 1976)
- Spoiled Girl (Epic Records, 1985)
- Coming Around Again (Arista Records, 1987)

With Richard Marx

- Repeat Offender (Capitol Records, 1989)
- Paid Vacation (Capitol Records, 1994)

With Neil Diamond

- Up on the Roof: Songs from the Brill Building (Columbia Records, 1993)
- The Christmas Album, Volume II (Columbia Records, 1994)

With Emmylou Harris and Rodney Crowell

- Old Yellow Moon (Nonesuch Records, 2013)

With Art Garfunkel

- Watermark (Columbia Records, 1977)

With Julia Fordham

- Falling Forward (Virgin Records, 1994)

With Gene Parsons

- Kindling (Warner Bros. Records, 1973)

With Barbra Streisand

- Wet (Columbia Records, 1979)

With Maria Muldaur

- Sweet Harmony (Reprise Records, 1976)
- Meet Me at Midnite (Black Top Records, 1994)

With Shelby Lynne

- Love, Shelby (Island Records, 2001)
- Identity Crisis (Capitol Records, 2003)

With Jane Wiedlin

- Jane Wiedlin (IRS Records, 1985)

With Dusty Springfield

- It Begins Again (Mercury Records, 1978)

With Donovan

- Lady of the Stars (RCA Records, 1984)

With Jennifer Warnes

- Famous Blue Raincoat (Cypress Records, 1986)

With Melissa Manchester

- Don't Cry Out Loud (Arista Records, 1978)

With Phoebe Snow

- Rock Away (Mirage, 1981)

With James Taylor

- That's Why I'm Here (Columbia Records, 1985)
- Never Die Young (Columbia Records, 1988)

With Dolly Parton

- Great Balls of Fire (RCA Records, 1979)
- Dolly, Dolly, Dolly (RCA Victor, 1981)

With Leo Sayer

- Endless Flight (Chrysalis Records, 1976)
- Here (Chrysalis Records, 1979)

With Valerie Carter

- Just a Stone's Throw Away (Columbia Records, 1977)

With Yvonne Elliman

- Night Flight (RSO Records, 1978)

With Linda Ronstadt

- Mad Love (Asylum Records, 1980)
- Get Closer (Asylum Records, 1982)

With Rita Coolidge

- Heartbreak Radio (A&M Records, 1981)
- Inside the Fire (A&M Records, 1984)

With Nicolette Larson

- Nicolette (Warner Bros. Records, 1978)
- In the Nick of Time (Warner Bros. Records, 1979)
- Radioland (Warner Bros. Records, 1981)
- All Dressed Up and No Place to Go (Warner Bros. Records, 1981)

With Taj Mahal

- Dancing the Blues (Private Music, 1993)

With Doobie Brothers

- Toulouse Street (Warner Brothers, 1972)
- The Captain and Me (Warner Brothers, 1973
- What Were Once Vices Are Now Habits (Warner Brothers, 1974)
- Stampede (Warner Brothers, 1975)
- Minute by Minute (Warner Brothers, 1978)
- Cycles (Capitol Records, 1989)
- World Gone Crazy (HOR Records, 2010)
- Live at the Beacon Theatre (Rhino Records, 2019)
- Liberté (Island Records, 2021)

With Tom Johnston

- Everything You've Heard Is True (Warner Brothers, 1979)

With Patrick Simmons

- Arcade (Elektra, 1983)
