= ...Say When =

Studio album by Nicolette Larson
- Released: March 18, 1985
- Studio: Sound Stage Studios and Emerald Studios (Nashville, Tennessee)
- Genre: Country
- Length: 31:32
- Label: MCA
- Producer: Emory Gordy Jr.; Tony Brown

Nicolette Larson chronology
All Dressed Up and No Place to Go (1982)	...Say When (1985)	Rose of My Heart (1986)

Singles from ...Say When
- 1. "Only Love Will Make It Right" Released: January 1985; 2. "When You Get a Little Lonely" Released: May 1985; 3. "Building Bridges" Released: September 1985

...Say When is the fifth studio album by American singer Nicolette Larson. It was produced by Emory Gordy Jr. and Tony Brown, and released by MCA Records in 1985.

== Background ==
Having signed with MCA in 1983, ...Say When was Larson's first of two country albums for the label. It peaked at No. 48 on the Billboard Top Country Albums and remained on the chart for twenty weeks. Three singles were released from the album. "Only Love Will Make It Right" was released in January 1985 and reached No. 42 on Billboard's Hot Country Songs. "When You Get a Little Lonely", released in May, reached No. 46. The final single, "Building Bridges", was released in September and peaked at No. 72.

In 2012, Raven Records gave the album its first CD release, as a double-album set with Larson's 1986 follow-up album Rose of My Heart.

== Critical reception ==
Professional ratings
Review scores
Source	Rating
AllMusic	3/5 stars

Upon release, Billboard considered Larson a "high energy addition to the new breed of today's country artists". They felt the album "spins through a kaleidoscope of material" and picked "When You Get a Little Lonely" as the album's "strong contender". Cash Box commented: "Thoroughly satisfying vocally, melodically and lyrically from start to finish, this latest album is further proof of Larson's consistent versatility as a performer."

In a retrospective review, Stephen Thomas Erlewine of AllMusic felt the album showed Larson "[diving] headfirst into contemporary country". He commented: "The bright, punchy sound is far removed from the lush, hazy SoCal soft rock of her five albums and it's right in line with the crisp sound coming of Nashville in the mid-'80s. The record stands as a strong slice of Reagan-era commercial country."

== Track listing ==
No.	Title	Writer(s)	Length
1.	"When You Get a Little Lonely"	Nicolette Larson, Josh Leo, Wendy Waldman	3:32
2.	"Say When"	Gary Nicholson, Kevin Welch	2:43
3.	"Building Bridges"	Larry Willoughby, Hank DeVito	3:48
4.	"Only Love Will Make It Right"	Bob McDill	3:01
5.	"I Just Keep Falling in Love"	Steve Goodman, Bill LaBounty	3:08
6.	"Break Away"	Gary Nicholson, Wayland Holyfield	3:02
7.	"Blow on Chilly Wind"	Jesse Winchester	3:28
8.	"Dancin' 'Round and 'Round"	Adam Mitchell	3:41
9.	"You Were the One"	Randy Albright	2:26
10.	"You Can't Say (You Don't Love Me Anymore)"	John Jarvis, Bill Lamb	2:39

== Personnel ==
- Nicolette Larson – vocals, harmony vocals (2, 4, 7, 8)
- John Hobbs – keyboards (1–8, 10)
- John Barlow Jarvis – acoustic piano (10)
- Richard Bennett – acoustic guitars, electric guitar solo (1)
- Billy Joe Walker Jr. – electric guitars (1–8, 10), acoustic guitars (9)
- Brent Rowan – electric guitar solo (2, 7)
- Sonny Garrish – steel guitar (3, 4, 8)
- Hank DeVito – steel guitar (5, 7)
- Jerry Douglas – dobro (4, 9)
- Emory Gordy Jr. – bass
- James Stroud – drums (1–8, 10)
- Jim Horn – saxophone solo (5)
- Vince Gill – harmony vocals (1–4, 6)
- Emmylou Harris – harmony vocals (1)
- Jonathan Edwards – harmony vocals (2, 7)
- Sharon White – harmony vocals (3, 9)
- Ricky Skaggs – harmony vocals (9)

Production

- Tony Brown – producer
- Emory Gordy Jr. – producer
- Steve Tillisch – recording, mixing
- Mark Coddington – engineer
- Russ Martin – engineer
- Tim Kish – engineer
- Glenn Meadows – mastering at Masterfonics (Nashville, Tennessee)
- Jeff Adamoff – art direction
- Tracy Veal – design
- Alan Messer – photography

== Chart performance ==
Chart (1985)	Peak position
US Billboard Top Country Albums	48
