= Ted Templeman =

American record producer

- Born: Edward John Templeman; October 24, 1942 (age 83); Santa Cruz, California, U.S.
- Genre: Rock
- Occupation: Record producer
- Label: Warner Bros.

Edward John Templeman (born October 24, 1942) is an American musician and record producer. Among the acts with whom he has had a long relationship are the rock bands Doobie Brothers and Van Halen and the singer Van Morrison; he produced multiple critically acclaimed and commercially successful albums for each of them.

== Career ==
Templeman was born in Santa Cruz, California, where he began his career in the mid-1960s as a drummer in a band called The Tikis. At the suggestion of Warner Bros. staff producer Lenny Waronker, the group decided to change their name to Harpers Bizarre in 1966, with Templeman switching to guitar and vocals. In 1967, the group released the album Feelin' Groovy (Warner Bros.), which included material by Randy Newman that later appeared on the songwriter's 1972 album Sail Away. Harpers Bizarre disbanded in 1970.

In September 1970, Templeman began working in an entry-level A&R position for Warner Bros. Records, auditioning demo tapes by unknown artists. It was then that he discovered the San Jose-based biker band the Doobie Brothers, and produced their eponymous The Doobie Brothers debut album, followed the next year by the Doobies' Toulouse Street album, which achieved platinum record status on the strength of the hit single "Listen to the Music". After the success of Toulouse Street, Templeman was promoted to staff producer at Warner Bros. Records and continued a long professional relationship with the Doobie Brothers, producing many more hit singles and albums for the group.

Much of his production work throughout his career was done in collaboration with recording engineer Donn Landee at Sunset Sound Recorders in Hollywood, California.

In 1973, Templeman produced another classic and eponymous album, Montrose, which was released in October of that year. The group was founded by guitarist and bandleader Ronnie Montrose (who had worked with singers such as Van Morrison and Edgar Winter), and an up-and-coming singer, Sammy Hagar, who brought songs like "Bad Motor Scooter" and "Make It Last" to the guitarist. (In the following decade, Templeman produced albums for Hagar's solo project and later as lead singer with Van Halen.) It was during this period that he was made a vice president at the record label.

In 1976, he produced Carly Simon's sixth studio album, Another Passenger, for which he arranged for both the Doobie Brothers and Little Feat to serve as Simon's backing band. The album was not as commercially oriented as her previous work with producer Richard Perry, and its first single, a cover of the Doobies' "It Keeps You Runnin'", did not reach the Top 40. However, the album received critical praise, and many of its songs received airplay on album-oriented FM radio stations.

On February 2, 1977, Templeman witnessed a live performance by Van Halen at The Starwood Lounge in Hollywood and persuaded Warner Bros. Chairman Mo Ostin that he should sign the group. Templeman produced their self-titled first album and went on to produce six more albums for Van Halen. In an interview, Templeman says that during the recording of "Unchained", he assumed the song had ended so he told lead singer David Lee Roth, "Come on Dave, gimme a break!", to which Roth replied, "One break, coming up!", leading into the song's chorus, turning an accident into an iconic moment in Van Halen's history. Templeman also produced Roth's first two solo records, the EP Crazy from the Heat and the album Eat 'Em and Smile.

Other artists produced by Templeman include Van Morrison (Tupelo Honey, Saint Dominic's Preview, It's Too Late to Stop Now), Captain Beefheart (Clear Spot), Little Feat ("Sailin' Shoes", "Time Loves a Hero"), Michael McDonald (If That's What It Takes), Aerosmith (Done with Mirrors), Eric Clapton (Behind the Sun), Nicolette Larson, Bette Midler, Allan Holdsworth, and Cheap Trick.

Since the late 1980s, Templeman has worked more sporadically. In the mid-2000s, he produced two albums by Joan Jett and the Blackhearts, and in 2008, he began working with the Doobie Brothers again on a new album.

== In popular culture ==
Community creator and Channel 101 co-creator Dan Harmon portrayed a fictionalized version of Templeman on the Channel 101 web series Yacht Rock, a satirical history of soft rock. Two episodes of the series fictionalize Templeman's collaborations with The Doobie Brothers, Michael McDonald, and Van Halen.

== As producer ==
- The Doobie Brothers, The Doobie Brothers (1971) (co-produced with Lenny Waronker)
- Tupelo Honey, Van Morrison (1971) (co-produced with Van Morrison)
- Clear Spot, Captain Beefheart (1972) (co-produced with Don Van Vliet)
- Saint Dominic's Preview, Van Morrison (1972) (co-produced with Van Morrison)
- Toulouse Street, The Doobie Brothers (1972)
- Sailin' Shoes, Little Feat (1972)
- The Captain and Me, The Doobie Brothers (1973)
- Montrose, Montrose (1973)
- Chunky, Novi & Ernie, Chunky, Novi and Ernie (1973) (co-produced with John Cale)
- What Were Once Vices Are Now Habits, The Doobie Brothers (1974)
- Paper Money, Montrose (1974) (co-produced with Montrose)
- It's Too Late to Stop Now, Van Morrison (1974)
- Stampede, The Doobie Brothers (1975)
- The Beau Brummels, The Beau Brummels (1975)
- Another Passenger, Carly Simon (1976)
- Takin' It to the Streets, The Doobie Brothers (1976)
- Livin' on the Fault Line, The Doobie Brothers (1977)
- Time Loves a Hero, Little Feat (1977)
- Minute by Minute, The Doobie Brothers (1978)
- Van Halen, Van Halen (1978)
- Nicolette, Nicolette Larson (1978)
- Van Halen II, Van Halen (1979)
- Everything You've Heard Is True, Tom Johnston (1979)
- In the Nick of Time, Nicolette Larson (1979)
- Live at the Roxy, Nicolette Larson (1979)
- One Step Closer, The Doobie Brothers (1980)
- Women and Children First, Van Halen (1980)
- Radioland, Nicolette Larson (1981)
- Fair Warning, Van Halen (1981)
- If That's What It Takes, Michael McDonald (1982)
- Diver Down, Van Halen (1982)
- All Dressed Up and No Place to Go, Nicolette Larson (1982) (Executive Producer)
- Carrera, Carrera (1983)
- Road Games, Allan Holdsworth (1983) (Executive Producer)
- Farewell Tour, The Doobie Brothers (1983)
- Arcade, Patrick Simmons (1983)
- 1984, Van Halen (1984)
- VOA, Sammy Hagar (1984)
- Combonation, Combination (1984)
- Crazy from the Heat, David Lee Roth (1985)
- Behind the Sun, Eric Clapton (1985) (co-produced several tracks with Lenny Waronker; other tracks produced by Phil Collins)
- Done with Mirrors, Aerosmith (1985)
- No Lookin' Back, Michael McDonald (co-produced with Michael McDonald & George Perilli)
- Eat 'Em and Smile, David Lee Roth (1986)
- Racing After Midnight, Honeymoon Suite (1988)
- BulletBoys, BulletBoys (1988)
- Talk to Your Daughter, Robben Ford (1988) (Executive Producer)
- Private Life, Private Life (1989) (co-produced with Edward Van Halen and Donn Landee)
- Atomic Playboys, Steve Stevens (1989) (Exec. Producer)
- Take It to Heart, Michael McDonald (1990) (co-produced with Michael McDonald and Don Was)
- Shadows, Private Life (1990) (co-produced with Edward Van Halen and Donn Landee)
- Freakshow, BulletBoys (1991)
- For Unlawful Carnal Knowledge, Van Halen (1991) (co-produced with Andy Johns)
- Lightning Rod Man, Lowell George & the Factory (1993)
- Za-Za, BulletBoys (1993)
- Seducing Down the Door: A Collection, 1970-1990, John Cale (1994)
- Woke Up with a Monster, Cheap Trick (1994)
- Mugzy's Move, Royal Crown Revue (1996)
- The Postman: Music From the Original Motion Picture, Various Artists (1997) (produced 'You Didn't Have to be So Nice,' by Amy Grant and Kevin Costner)
- The Contender, Royal Crown Revue (1998)
- Bathhouse Betty, Bette Midler (1998)
- The Philosopher's Stone, Van Morrison (1998)
- Naked, Joan Jett and the Blackhearts (2004) (co-produced with Kenny Laguna, Bob Rock, Joey Levine, and Joan Jett)
- Sinner, Joan Jett and the Blackhearts (2006) (co-produced with Kenny Laguna, Bob Rock, Joey Levine, and Joan Jett)
- World Gone Crazy, The Doobie Brothers (2010)
