= Mary's Danish =

American rock band

Mary's Danish (1991)

Mary's Danish was an alternative rock band that was formed in Los Angeles, California in the late 1980s which released four albums, with the last in 1992. Mary's Danish blended rock, funk, country and soul elements.

== Origins ==
Named after a line in an old songwriting attempt, the band was led by two female lead singers, Gretchen Seager and Julie Ritter. David Archbold King and Matt Colleran played guitar, with Christopher Scott "Wag" Wagner on the bass, and James Oliver Bradley Jr. later replacing Nick Zeigler on drums. Colleran was replaced by Louis Gutierrez of Louis & Clark and The Three O'Clock. The band produced four albums, two with Chameleon Records and two with Morgan Creek Records.

== The Chameleon Records era and "Don't Crash the Car Tonight" ==
Their first album There Goes the Wondertruck was released in 1989. It featured the single "Don't Crash the Car Tonight" which gained the band an initial following. The band had some early success, and was chosen by Robert Hilburn of the Los Angeles Times as one of 1989's brightest newcomers. That same year they were listed by Rolling Stone as one of their "Top Five New Faces." The Hollywood Reporter referred to the band in a review as having "spirited anarchy and rocksolid musicianship."

A live album was released later in the year titled Experience (Live + Foxy Lady). However, they felt that the record label wanted consistent hit music, so they left the label in 1990.

== The Morgan Creek Records era ==
The band subsequently switched to Morgan Creek Records, with Circa being released in 1991 and American Standard in 1992. However, the experience with Morgan Creek was from all accounts not a happy one, and a dispute with the label ended with the band and Morgan Creek parting ways in 1993 and the band subsequently disbanding. However, their 1992 cover of "I Fought the Law" was featured in the film Buffy The Vampire Slayer (1992), and the accompanying soundtrack release Buffy the Vampire Slayer Soundtrack.

== Since the breakup ==
After the breakup, three members of the band, Seager, Gutierrez and Wagner, later formed Battery Acid. Battery Acid released one album, Rita, on Absinthe Records.

In 1993 bassist Chris Wagner, guitarist David King and drummer James Bradley Jr. formed a band with Robbie Allen called Rob Rule which was contracted by Mercury Records by A&R Rep Bobby Carlton. They produced a first album, but neglected to promote it. Although touring the US, the band never received acclaim or promotion, and later dissolved. Bradley Jr. then went on to join rap-rock group Crazy Town.

Julie Ritter later released two albums: the first was in 1995 on New Alliance Records, which was a spoken word album called "Medicine Show." She then showcased a full debut album titled "Songs of Love and Empire" on Luxstar Recordings in 1999.

The band has occasionally reunited for one-off concerts. In June 1997, Mary's Danish got together for a show at the Viper Room in Los Angeles. They next appeared at the House of Blues in LA in June 1999. Guitarist David King died in July 2021.

== Discography ==
Studio albums

- There Goes the Wondertruck (1989)
- Circa (1991)
- American Standard (1992)

Live albums

- Experience (Live + Foxey Lady) (1989)
