= Nicolette Larson =

American singer (1952–1997)

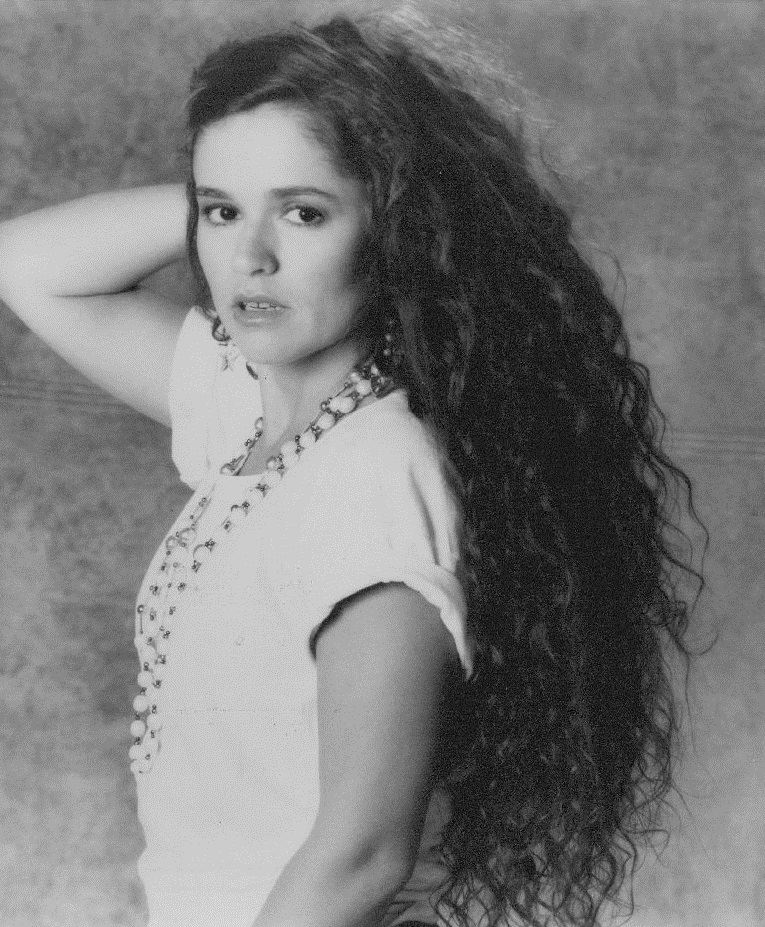
- Larson (age 33; 1985)

Background information
- Born: July 17, 1952; Helena, Montana, U.S.
- Died: December 16, 1997 (aged 45) Los Angeles, California, U.S.
- Genres: Country; country rock; folk; folk rock; blue-eyed soul; folk-pop; adult contemporary music; pop
- Occupation: Singer
- Instruments: Vocals; guitar
- Years active: 1973–1997
- Labels: Warner Bros.; MCA; CGD; Sony Wonder
- Formerly of: Commander Cody; Steve Wariner; Neil Young; Emmylou Harris

Nicolette Larson (July 17, 1952 – December 16, 1997) was an American singer. She is best known for her work in the late 1970s with Neil Young and her 1978 hit single of Young's "Lotta Love", which hit No. 1 on the Hot Adult Contemporary Tracks chart and No. 8 on the pop singles chart. It was followed by four more adult contemporary hits, two of which were also minor pop hits.

By 1985, she shifted her focus to country music, charting six times on the US country singles chart. Her only top-40 country hit was "That's How You Know When Love's Right", a duet with Steve Wariner. She died in December 1997 of cerebral edema and liver failure.

== Early life and career ==
Nicolette Larson was born in Helena, Montana. Her father's employment with the U.S. Treasury Department necessitated frequent relocation for the family. She graduated from high school in Kansas City, Missouri, where she attended the University of Missouri for three semesters and worked at waitressing and office jobs before beginning to pursue the musical career she had dreamed of since singing along to the radio as a child.

In the early 1970s, Larson eventually settled in San Francisco, California, where she worked in a record store (Discount Records, on Telegraph Avenue in Berkeley, which also sold tickets for shows at the Fillmore West and Winterland) and for the Golden Gate Country Bluegrass Festival. Turning to singing, she began her performance career with a booking as the opening act for Eric Andersen at The Egress, a club in Vancouver, British Columbia. In 1975, Larson auditioned for Hoyt Axton, who was producing Commander Cody. This led to Larson singing with Hoyt Axton and The Banana Band, who were opening for Joan Baez on the "Diamonds and Rust" tour in 1975. She earned her first recording credit on Commander Cody's 1975 album Tales from the Ozone, toured with his band and also provided background vocals on subsequent Commander Cody albums in 1977 and 1978. Other early career singing credits were for Axton and Guy Clark, both in 1976; the following year her resume included further credits with Mary Kay Place, Rodney Crowell, Billy Joe Shaver, Jesse Colin Young, Jesse Winchester, and Gary Stewart.

Larson and Guthrie Thomas both had their first professional recording session on Axton's Southbound album for A&M Records. As newcomers to the recording industry, they were listed on the back cover of the album as "Street Singers", entirely separate from the highly paid, more established artists also appearing on the album.

Larson's work with Emmylou Harris – whose 1977 album Luxury Liner prominently showcased Larson on the song "Hello Stranger" – led to her meeting and then befriending Harris's associate and friend Linda Ronstadt. In 1977, Larson was at Ronstadt's Malibu home when neighbor Neil Young phoned to ask Ronstadt if she could recommend a female vocal accompanist. Ronstadt suggested Larson; she was the third person that day to mention Larson to Young. He came over to meet Larson, who recalled, "Neil ran down all the songs he had just written, about twenty of them. We sang harmonies with him and he was jazzed."

The following week Ronstadt and Larson cut their vocals for Young's American Stars 'n Bars album at Young's La Honda ranch – the two women were billed on the album as the Bullets – and, in November 1977, Young invited Larson to Nashville to sing on his Comes a Time album. This led to Larson's being signed to Warner Bros. Records.

Larson continued her background singing career into 1978, accruing credit on recordings by Marcia Ball, Rodney Crowell, Emmylou Harris (Quarter Moon in a Ten Cent Town), and Norton Buffalo. She also sang on the Doobie Brothers' Minute by Minute. That album's producer, Ted Templeman, then produced Larson's debut album, Nicolette.

== 1978–1983 ==
Larson's work with Commander Cody had led to her being signed to the C&W division of Warner Bros. Records. However her debut album Nicolette, released September 29, 1978, was an eclectic mix of rock, C&W and R&B.

Despite the release of her album so late in the year, Larson was acclaimed Female Vocalist of 1978 by Rolling Stone, which wrote no one else could sound as if she were having so much fun on an album. Nicolette reached No. 15 on Billboard's album chart aided by the hit single "Lotta Love", a Neil Young composition. Larson's "Lotta Love" hit #1 on the Easy Listening/Adult Contemporary chart and went Top 10 Pop in February 1979. Linda Ronstadt, Valerie Carter, Bill Payne, James Burton, and Patrick Simmons performed on the Nicolette album.

In 1979 the Warner Brothers Music Show label issued 500 promotional copies of the 12" vinyl record album WBMS 103 titled "Nicolette Live at the Roxy" comprising a December 20, 1978, concert that given by Larson at the Sunset Boulevard nightclub. Larson was also featured on the No Nukes album recorded in September 1979 at Madison Square Garden, backed by the Doobie Brothers in her performance of "Lotta Love".

Larson would be unable to consolidate the commercial success augured by her debut: the second single off Nicolette, "Rhumba Girl" just missed becoming a major hit for Larson at No. 48. Her second album, In the Nick of Time, released November 1979, failed to showcase Larson's voice attractively. Don Shewey in Rolling Stone wrote:

Larson's rough-edged, down-home tone is definitely appealing – especially when she backs up the likes of Neil Young and Steve Goodman [whose High and Outside album featured a duet with Larson: "The One That Got Away"] – but as a soloist, her limited vocal resources are "severely taxed" – "It's symptomatic of Nicolette Larson's problems as a performer that the finest singing on In the Nick of Time is by Michael McDonald. 'Let Me Go, Love' ... McDonald's entrancing vocal presence ... so overshadows Larson's that she seems to be playing second fiddle rather than sharing the lead. Elsewhere, Larson is dwarfed by Ted Templeman's typically luxurious production".

Released as the album's lead single, "Let Me Go Love" reached only No. 35 in February 1980. That year Larson was heard on the airwaves via guest appearances on "Say You'll Be Mine" by Christopher Cross and the Dirt Band's "Make a Little Magic". Larson had enough residual popularity from her debut for In the Nick of Time to become a moderate success. Because she had no major hit, Larson's 1981 and 1982 album releases, Radioland (her last album produced by Templeman) and All Dressed Up and No Place to Go, were unsuccessful, even though both releases showed Larson back in strong vocal form. In 1982 Larson received some adult-contemporary radio airplay with her remake of "I Only Want to Be With You" (No. 53).

Larson had continued her background singing career accruing credits on releases by Tom Johnston, Linda Ronstadt (Mad Love), Graham Nash, John Stewart, Albert Hammond, and Rita Coolidge. Larson again backed the Doobie Brothers on their One Step Closer album; she can be heard on the hit "Real Love." A song Larson co-wrote with John McFee and Patrick Simmons titled "Can't Let It Get Away" was a 1981 single release for the Doobie Brothers in Japan.

Larson's recording of the Burt Bacharach/Carole Bayer Sager song "Fool Me Again" was featured on the bestselling soundtrack album for the 1981 film Arthur, despite not being heard in the film. Larson was also featured on the soundtrack album for National Lampoon's Vacation (1983) with the track "Summer Hearts".

Larson's appearance in a touring production of the C&W musical Pump Boys and Dinettes garnered enough positive reaction for MCA Nashville to sign her in 1983.

== 1984–1997 ==
The Nashville music community was so enthused about Larson's C&W cross-over that in 1984 the Academy of Country Music named her the Best New Female Vocalist before she had any MCA Nashville releases. Larson's MCA debut ...Say When was not released until 1985 (by which point country pop was no longer in style and neotraditionalists had taken over the country scene). The C&W career it ushered in for Larson proved anticlimactic with only one of her six MCA single releases becoming a significant hit: her duet with Steve Wariner titled "That's How You Know When Love's Right," taken from the April 1986 album release Rose of My Heart. The record reached No. 9 C&W. Larson's MCA albums, produced by Emory Gordy Jr. and Tony Brown, attracted little critical attention. Her final mainstream album release was Shadows of Love, a 1988 recording made for the Italian CGD label and produced by Carlo Stretti and Ernesto Taberelli. It was her only album for a non-US label.

In the winter of 1988, Nicolette appeared as a nightclub singer in the Ivan Reitman-directed comedy Twins, performing the song "I'd Die For This Dance", backed up by Jeff Beck on guitar. The song is only available on the film's soundtrack.

In 1992, Larson reunited professionally with Neil Young to sing on his Harvest Moon album. In 1993 she was featured on Young's Unplugged. Larson's final album was the self-produced Sleep, Baby, Sleep, consisting of music for children, released by Sony Wonder in 1994.

Larson also contributed to the seasonal albums Tennessee Christmas (1987) with "One Bright Star", Acoustic Christmas (1988) with "Christmas Is a Time for Giving," and Have Yourself a Merry Little Christmas (1989) with "Nothing But a Child" and "One Bright Star". In 1988, Larson contributed to the soundtracks of the film They Call Me Renegade with the track "Let Me Be the One" from her 1988 album Shadows of Love.

While it was recorded in 1978, Live at the Roxy was given its first full release in 2006, nine years after Larson's death. It was released by Rhino. Also in 2006, Rhino Entertainment released the album A Tribute to Nicolette Larson: Lotta Love Concert. Two "Lotta Love" concerts were held on February 20 and 21, 1998, in Santa Monica, CA, to benefit the UCLA Children's Hospital.

== Personal life ==
Through her early work in the 1970s with Emmylou Harris, Larson met guitarist and songwriter Hank DeVito. Larson and DeVito later married and divorced. She also dated Neil Young during the Comes a Time sessions. In the early 1980s, Larson was engaged to Andrew Gold, but their relationship ended shortly after the completion of Larson's 1982 album All Dressed Up and No Place to Go, which Gold had produced. In the late 1980s, she briefly dated "Weird Al" Yankovic. Yankovic would later compose "You Don't Love Me Anymore", a style parody of Larson's work, for his 1992 album Off the Deep End. In 1990, Larson married drummer Russ Kunkel, and the two remained married until her death in 1997. The couple's daughter, Elsie May Larson-Kunkel, was born in 1990.

== Death ==
Larson died on December 16, 1997, in Los Angeles, California, as a result of complications arising from cerebral edema triggered by liver failure. She was 45 years old. According to her friend Astrid Young (Neil Young's half-sister), Larson had been showing symptoms of depression, and her fatal seizure "was in no small way related to her chronic use of Valium and Tylenol PM." Two benefit concerts were held in Larson's honor in February 1998. A tribute album was released in 2006 and Carole King and other famous musicians joined the album.

== Discography ==
=== Albums ===
| Year | Album | Chart positions | | | | Certifications |
| Year | Album | US | US Country | AUS | CAN | Certifications |
|---|---|---|---|---|---|---|
| 1978 | Nicolette | 15 | — | 6 | 1 | RIAA: Gold; ARIA: Gold; MC: Gold |
| 1979 | In the Nick of Time | 47 | — | 35 | 71 | |
| 1979 | Live at the Roxy (only as Promo) | — | — | — | — | |
| 1981 | Radioland | 62 | — | 68 | — | |
| 1982 | All Dressed Up and No Place to Go | 75 | — | 95 | — | |
| 1985 | ...Say When | — | 48 | — | — | |
| 1986 | Rose of My Heart | — | 40 | — | — | |
| 1988 | Shadows of Love | — | — | — | — | |
| 1994 | Sleep, Baby, Sleep: Quiet Songs for Quiet Times | — | — | — | — | |
| 1995 | That's How You Know When Love Is Right (cassette) | — | — | — | — | |
| 1999 | The Very Best of Nicolette Larson | — | — | — | — | |
| 2006 | A Tribute to Nicolette Larson: Lotta Love Concert | — | — | — | — | |
| 2006 | Live at the Roxy (recorded in 1979) | — | — | — | — | |

=== Singles ===
| Year | Title | Peak positions | | | | | | | | | Album |
| Year | Title | US | US AC | US Country | US R&B | AUS | CAN | CAN AC | CAN Country | NZ | Album |
|---|---|---|---|---|---|---|---|---|---|---|---|
| 1978 | "Lotta Love" | 8 | 1 | — | — | 11 | 4 | 1 | — | 22 | Nicolette |
| 1979 | "Rhumba Girl" | 47 | 38 | — | — | — | 4 | — | — | — | Nicolette |
| 1979 | "Give a Little" | 104 | 19 | — | — | — | — | — | — | | Nicolette |
| 1979 | "Let Me Go, Love" | 35 | 9 | — | 9 | — | — | — | — | — | In the Nick of Time |
| 1980 | "Dancin' Jones" | — | — | — | — | — | — | — | — | — | In the Nick of Time |
| 1980 | "Back in My Arms" | — | — | — | — | — | — | — | — | — | In the Nick of Time |
| 1981 | "Ooo-Eee" | 110 | — | — | — | — | — | — | — | — | Radioland |
| 1981 | "When You Come Around" | — | — | — | — | — | — | — | — | — | Radioland |
| 1981 | "Radioland" | — | — | — | — | — | — | — | — | — | Radioland |
| 1981 | "Fool Me Again" | 105 | — | — | — | — | — | — | — | — | Arthur (soundtrack) |
| 1982 | "I Only Want to Be with You" | 53 | 15 | — | — | — | — | — | — | — | All Dressed Up & No Place to Go |
| 1985 | "Only Love Will Make Love Right" | — | — | 42 | — | — | — | 33 | — | — | ...Say When |
| 1985 | "When You Get a Little Lonely" | — | — | 46 | — | — | — | — | — | — | ...Say When |
| 1985 | "Building Bridges" | — | — | 72 | — | — | — | — | — | — | ...Say When |
| 1986 | "Let Me Be the First" | — | — | 63 | — | — | — | — | — | — | Rose of My Heart |
| 1986 | "That's How You Know When Love's Right" (with Steve Wariner) | — | — | 9 | — | — | — | — | 9 | — | Rose of My Heart |
| 1986 | "That's More About Love (Than I Wanted to Know)" | — | — | 49 | — | — | — | — | — | — | Rose of My Heart |
| 1988 | "Let Me Be the One" | — | — | — | — | — | — | — | — | — | Shadows of Love |

== Awards and nominations ==
| Year | Organization | Award | Nominee/Work | Result |
|---|---|---|---|---|
| 1985 | Academy of Country Music Awards | Top New Female Vocalist | Nicolette Larson | Won |
| 1986 | Country Music Association Awards | Vocal Duo of the Year | Nicolette Larson and Steve Wariner | Nominated |

== See also ==
- Valerie Carter
