= Waiting for Columbus =

Live album by Little Feat
- Released: February 10, 1978
- Recorded: August 1–4, 1977; August 8–10, 1977
- Venues: Rainbow Theatre (London, UK); Lisner Auditorium, George Washington University (Washington, D.C., US)
- Length: 81:37
- Label: Warner Bros.
- Producer: Lowell George

Little Feat chronology
Time Loves a Hero (1977)	Waiting for Columbus (1978)	Down on the Farm (1979)

Professional ratings
Review scores
Source	Rating
AllMusic	4.5/5 stars
Encyclopedia of Popular Music	4/5 stars
Pitchfork	8.4/10
Rolling Stone	(favorable)

Waiting for Columbus is the first live album by the band Little Feat, recorded during seven performances in 1977. The first four shows were held at the Rainbow Theatre in London on August 1–4, 1977. The final three shows were recorded the following week at George Washington University's Lisner Auditorium in Washington, D.C., on August 8–10. Local Washington radio personality Don "Cerphe" Colwell can be heard leading the audience in a "F-E-A-T" spellout in between the first ("Join the Band") and second ("Fat Man in the Bathtub") tracks.

The band were backed by the Tower of Power horn section with whom they had recorded for their 1974 album Feats Don't Fail Me Now. The result was one of their biggest selling albums.

Many of their more well-known songs were either re-worked or extended. For instance, one of their signature songs, "Dixie Chicken", was heavily extended to include a lengthy piano solo by keyboardist Bill Payne, a Dixieland horn arrangement and finally a dual guitar jam between the band's two guitarists, Lowell George and Paul Barrère. In some cases, songs such as "Rocket in My Pocket" and "Mercenary Territory" were re-worked to include the horn section, and Little Feat additionally covered such tunes as Fraternity of Man's "Don't Bogart That Joint" and Allen Toussaint's "On Your Way Down" (which had also appeared on 1973's Dixie Chicken album). Former Rolling Stones guitarist Mick Taylor makes a guest appearance playing slide guitar on "A Apolitical Blues".

The band recorded and mixed enough material from these performances for a triple LP, but for marketing reasons kept it to a double album. Three of the unused tracks were included on their 1981 album Hoy-Hoy!. All were eventually released on the 2002 "Deluxe edition" CD.

It was voted number 804 in the third edition of Colin Larkin's All Time Top 1000 Albums (2000).

The cover art, by Neon Park, depicts items from the Americas unknown to Europeans before Columbus: an anthropomorphic tomato on a hammock in front of a backdrop of American native foliage and cactus.

== Vinyl reissue LPs ==
There have been two different half-speed mastered vinyl reissues on LP, both on the Mobile Fidelity label and containing the original full track list. The first reissue was released not long after the original Warner Brothers LP, was mastered by Stan Ricker, MFSL 2–013, and pressed by JVC in Japan and features a GOLD banner on the cover. The other is a 2011 release on Warner Brothers Records. This version is MFSL 2–322. It was mastered by Shawn R. Britton and pressed on 180g vinyl by Record Technology Incorporated in Camarillo, CA. This version features a GREEN banner the cover.

In order to fit the double LP onto one CD, the tracks "Don't Bogart That Joint" and "A Apolitical Blues" were omitted from this release, but included as additional tracks on the CD issue of The Last Record Album.

== Track listing ==
Side one
No.	Title	Writer(s)	Length
1.	"Join the Band"	Traditional	1:50
2.	"Fat Man in the Bathtub"	George	4:50
3.	"All That You Dream"	Barrère, Payne	4:25
4.	"Oh Atlanta"	Payne	4:09
5.	"Old Folks' Boogie"	Barrère, Gabriel Barrère	4:22

Side two
No.	Title	Writer(s)	Length
6.	"Time Loves a Hero"	Barrère, Gradney, Payne	4:20
7.	"Day or Night"	Payne, Fran Tate	5:23
8.	"Mercenary Territory"	George, Hayward	4:27
9.	"Spanish Moon"	George	4:49

Side three
No.	Title	Writer(s)	Length
10.	"Dixie Chicken"	George, Martin Kibbee	9:00
11.	"Tripe Face Boogie"	Hayward, Payne	7:02
12.	"Rocket in My Pocket"	George	3:42

Side four
No.	Title	Writer(s)	Length
13.	"Willin'"	George	4:42
14.	"Don't Bogart That Joint"	E. Ingber, L. Wagner	0:57
15.	"A Apolitical Blues"	George	3:41
16.	"Sailin' Shoes"	George	6:18
17.	"Feats Don't Fail Me Now"	Barrère, George, Kibbee	5:17
Total length:			81:37

1988 single CD
No.	Title	Writer(s)	Length
1.	"Join the Band"	Traditional	1:50
2.	"Fat Man in the Bathtub"	George	4:50
3.	"All That You Dream"	Barrère, Payne	4:25
4.	"Oh Atlanta"	Payne	4:09
5.	"Old Folks' Boogie"	Barrère, Gabriel Barrère	4:22
6.	"Time Loves a Hero"	Barrère, Gradney, Payne	4:20
7.	"Day or Night"	Payne, Fran Tate	5:23
8.	"Mercenary Territory"	George, Hayward	4:27
9.	"Spanish Moon"	George	4:49
10.	"Dixie Chicken"	George, Martin Kibbee	9:00
11.	"Tripe Face Boogie"	Hayward, Payne	7:02
12.	"Rocket in My Pocket"	George	3:42
13.	"Willin'"	George	4:42
14.	"Sailin' Shoes"	George	6:18
15.	"Feats Don't Fail Me Now"	Barrère, George, Kibbee	5:17
Total length:			74:00

=== 2002 "Deluxe Edition" double CD ===
This release now contains all the songs that were performed at the series of shows recorded for this album. From the Rhino reissue liner notes (p. 23):

- Disc 1 - (all) & Disc 2, Tracks 1–5: From the original release of Waiting for Columbus. [Note: For aesthetic reasons, the playing order of Sides 2 (tks 9–12) & 3 (tks 6–8) has been switched so that the band's main set (contained on Disc 1) now concludes with the long ovation that leads into the encore.]
- Disc 2 - Tracks 6–10: Performances that were refurbished & mixed for the original album, but not used.
- Disc 2 - Tracks 11–12: Selections that were apparently never considered for inclusion on either the original album or Hoy-Hoy!. They are newly mixed from the original multitrack tapes and do not contain any overdubs.
- Disc 2 - Tracks 13–15: First issued on the album Hoy-Hoy!.

Disc one
No.	Title	Writer(s)	Venue & date	Length
1.	"Join the Band"	Traditional	Lisner Auditorium, Washington D.C., August 10, 1977	1:54
2.	"Fat Man in the Bathtub"	George	Lisner Auditorium, Washington D.C., August 8, 1977	4:53
3.	"All That You Dream"	Barrère, Payne	Lisner Auditorium, Washington D.C., August 8, 1977	4:29
4.	"Oh Atlanta"	Payne	Lisner Auditorium, Washington D.C., August 8, 1977	4:20
5.	"Old Folks' Boogie"	Barrère, Gabriel Barrère	The Rainbow Theatre, London England, August 4, 1977	4:26
6.	"Dixie Chicken"	George, Martin Kibbee	The Rainbow Theatre, London England, August 3 & 4, 1977	8:53
7.	"Tripe Face Boogie"	Hayward, Payne	The Rainbow Theatre, London England, August 2 & 3, 1977	7:09
8.	"Rocket in My Pocket"	George	The Rainbow Theatre, London England, August 2, 1977	3:57
9.	"Time Loves a Hero"	Barrère, Gradney, Payne	The Rainbow Theatre, London England, August 4, 1977	4:19
10.	"Day or Night"	Payne, F. Tate	The Rainbow Theatre, London England, August 4, 1977	5:30
11.	"Mercenary Territory"	George, E. George, Hayward	The Rainbow Theatre, London England, August 2, 1977	4:36
12.	"Spanish Moon"	George	Lisner Auditorium, Washington D.C., August 8, 1977	5:36

Disc two
No.	Title	Writer(s)	Venue & date	Length
13.	"Willin'"	George	Lisner Auditorium, Washington D.C., August 8, 1977	4:42
14.	"Don't Bogart That Joint"	E. Ingber, L. Wagner	Lisner Auditorium, Washington D.C., August 8, 1977	1:01
15.	"A Apolitical Blues"	George	The Rainbow Theatre, London England, August 3, 1977	3:51
16.	"Sailin' Shoes"	George	Lisner Auditorium, Washington D.C., August 10, 1977	6:23
17.	"Feats Don't Fail Me Now"	Barrère, George, Kibbee	Lisner Auditorium, Washington D.C., August 9, 1977	5:35
18.	"One Love Stand"	Barrère, Gradney, Payne	Lisner Auditorium, Washington D.C., August 9, 1977	4:27
19.	"Rock and Roll Doctor"	George, Kibbee	Lisner Auditorium, Washington D.C., August 9, 1977	4:17
20.	"Skin It Back"	Barrère	The Rainbow Theatre, London England, August 2, 1977	5:40
21.	"On Your Way Down"	Allen Toussaint	Lisner Auditorium, Washington D.C., August 10, 1977	6:25
22.	"Walkin' All Night"	Barrère, Payne	Lisner Auditorium, Washington D.C., August 8, 1977	4:12
23.	"Cold, Cold, Cold"	George	The Rainbow Theatre, London England, August 4, 1977	5:18
24.	"Day at the Dog Races"	Barrère, Clayton, Gradney, Hayward, Payne	Lisner Auditorium Washington D.C., August 9, 1977	12:12
25.	"Skin It Back"	Barrère	Lisner Auditorium, Washington D.C., August 8, 1977	4:40
26.	"Red Streamliner"	Payne, F. Tate	Lisner Auditorium, Washington D.C., August 8, 1977	4:59
27.	"Teenage Nervous Breakdown"	George	Lisner Auditorium, Washington D.C., August 9, 1977	4:12
Total length:				2:17:56

=== 2022 "Super Deluxe Edition" eight CD box set ===
On 29 July 2022, Rhino released an eight disc "Super Deluxe Edition" of Waiting for Columbus. It contains three complete shows, the 2nd night from the Rainbow Theatre run, the final night from the Lisner Auditorium run, plus a completely unreleased live show recorded at Manchester City Hall.

Disc one - Original Album Remastered
No.	Title	Writer(s)	Length
1.	"Join the Band"	Traditional	1:55
2.	"Fat Man in the Bathtub"	George	4:54
3.	"All That You Dream"	Barrère, Payne	4:29
4.	"Oh Atlanta"	Payne	4:15
5.	"Old Folks' Boogie"	Barrère, Gabriel Barrère	4:32
6.	"Time Loves a Hero"	Barrère, Gradney, Payne	4:20
7.	"Day or Night"	Payne, Fran Tate	5:30
8.	"Mercenary Territory"	George, Hayward	4:38
9.	"Spanish Moon"	George	5:04

Disc two - Original Album Remastered
No.	Title	Writer(s)	Length
10.	"Dixie Chicken"	George, Martin Kibbee	9:02
11.	"Tripe Face Boogie"	Hayward, Payne	7:10
12.	"Rocket in My Pocket"	George	4:11
13.	"Willin'"	George	3:50
14.	"Don't Bogart That Joint"	E. Ingber, L. Wagner	1:02
15.	"A Apolitical Blues"	George	3:50
16.	"Sailin' Shoes"	George	6:26
17.	"Feats Don't Fail Me Now"	Barrère, George, Kibbee	5:35

Disc three - Live At Manchester City Hall, Manchester, UK, July 29, 1977
No.	Title	Length
1.	"Walkin' All Night"	4:50
2.	"Skin It Back"	5:15
3.	"Fat Man In The Bathtub"	5:26
4.	"Red Streamliner"	5:38
5.	"Oh Atlanta"	4:16
6.	"Day At The Dog Races"	9:56
7.	"All That You Dream"	4:59
8.	"On Your Way Down"	7:20
9.	"Time Loves A Hero"	4:26
10.	"Day Or Night"	7:51

Disc four - Live At Manchester City Hall, Manchester, UK, July 29, 1977
No.	Title	Length
1.	"Rock And Roll Doctor"	4:10
2.	"Old Folks Boogie"	4:31
3.	"Dixie Chicken"	12:49
4.	"Tripe Face Boogie"	8:13
5.	"Medley: Willin' / Don't Bogart That Joint"	5:34
6.	"Feats Don't Fail Me Now"	6:39
7.	"Rocket In My Pocket"	4:33
8.	"Sailin' Shoes"	5:19
9.	"Teenage Nervous Breakdown"	3:51

Disc five - Live At The Rainbow, London, UK, August 2, 1977
No.	Title	Length
1.	"Walkin' All Night"	5:02
2.	"Fat Man In The Bathtub"	5:04
3.	"Red Streamliner"	5:35
4.	"Oh Atlanta"	4:23
5.	"Day At The Dog Races"	12:51
6.	"All That You Dream"	5:36
7.	"Mercenary Territory"	4:36
8.	"On Your Way Down"	7:18
9.	"Skin It Back"	5:36
10.	"Old Folks Boogie"	4:41

Disc six - Live At The Rainbow, London, UK, August 2, 1977
No.	Title	Length
1.	"Rock And Roll Doctor"	4:21
2.	"Cold Cold Cold"	5:11
3.	"Dixie Chicken"	11:47
4.	"Tripe Face Boogie"	6:35
5.	"Medley: Willin' / Don't Bogart That Joint"	5:47
6.	"Feats Don't Fail Me Now"	7:12
7.	"Rocket In My Pocket"	3:49
8.	"Spanish Moon"	6:00
9.	"A Apolitical Blues"	5:05
10.	"Teenage Nervous Breakdown"	4:20

Disc seven - Live At Lisner Auditorium, Washington, D.C., August 10, 1977
No.	Title	Length
1.	"Walkin' All Night"	5:10
2.	"Red Streamliner"	5:38
3.	"Fat Man In The Bathtub"	5:06
4.	"Day At The Dog Races"	11:04
5.	"All That You Dream"	5:21
6.	"On Your Way Down"	6:41
7.	"Time Loves A Hero"	4:23
8.	"Day Or Night"	7:23
9.	"Skin It Back"	5:52

Disc eight - Live At Lisner Auditorium, Washington, D.C., August 10, 1977
No.	Title	Length
1.	"Oh Atlanta"	4:45
2.	"Old Folks Boogie"	4:05
3.	"Dixie Chicken"	14:04
4.	"Tripe Face Boogie"	7:43
5.	"Feats Don't Fail Me Now"	6:58
6.	"Rocket In My Pocket"	4:39
7.	"Sailin' Shoes"	6:21
8.	"Teenage Nervous Breakdown"	3:19
Total length:		7:05:06

== Personnel ==
=== Little Feat ===
- Paul Barrère – guitar, vocals
- Sam Clayton – congas, vocals
- Lowell George – lead vocals, guitar
- Kenny Gradney – bass guitar
- Richard Hayward – drums, vocals
- Bill Payne – keyboards, synthesizer, vocals

=== Guest musicians ===
- Mick Taylor – lead and slide guitar ("A Apolitical Blues")
- Michael McDonald and Patrick Simmons – backing vocals ("Red Streamliner")

=== Tower of Power horn section ===
- Emilio Castillo – tenor saxophone
- Greg Adams – trumpet, arrangements
- Lenny Pickett – alto saxophone, tenor saxophone, and clarinet ("Dixie Chicken")
- Stephen "Doc" Kupka – baritone saxophone
- Mic Gillette – trombone, trumpet

== Charts ==
1978 chart performance for Waiting for Columbus
Chart (1978)	Peak position
Australian Albums (Kent Music Report)	27
Dutch Albums (Album Top 100)	29
New Zealand Albums (RMNZ)	11
Norwegian Albums (VG-lista)	18
US Billboard 200	18

2022 chart performance for Waiting for Columbus
Chart (2022)	Peak position
Belgian Albums (Ultratop Flanders)	170
German Albums (Offizielle Top 100)	51
Swiss Albums (Schweizer Hitparade)	55

== Certifications ==
Region	Certification	Certified units/sales
United States (RIAA)	Platinum	1,000,000^{^}
^{^} Shipments figures based on certification alone.

== Tributes ==
- On 31 October 2010, American rock band Phish covered Waiting for Columbus in its entirety as their "musical costume" for their Halloween show at the Boardwalk Hall in Atlantic City, New Jersey.
- On 31 December 2011, Little Feat along with former member Craig Fuller performed the entire set on Jimmy Buffett's Radio Margaritaville.
