= Hoy-Hoy! =

Compilation album by Little Feat
- Released: July 1981
- Recorded: 1969–1981
- Length: 69:34
- Label: Warner Bros.
- Producer: Bill Payne; George Massenburg; Paul Barrère

Little Feat chronology
Down on the Farm (1979)	Hoy-Hoy! (1981)	Let It Roll (1988)

Professional ratings
Review scores
Source	Rating
AllMusic	4.5/5 stars
Rolling Stone	4/5 stars

Hoy-Hoy! is a Little Feat collection released in 1981 two years after the band's break-up following the death of founder Lowell George. Originally released as a double album and later a single CD, it contains alternate versions and live recordings of many Feat tracks as well as some previously unreleased material. The cover is illustrated by Neon Park.

== Content ==
The previously unreleased tracks are as follows:

- "Lonesome Whistle" – cover of a Hank Williams song, recorded in 1974.
- "Gringo" – a Bill Payne track now frequently performed live by Little Feat since their 1988 reunion. This 1981 recording features David Sanborn on saxophone and Nicolette Larson on backing vocals.
- "Over the Edge" – a Paul Barrère track recorded in 1981 for a movie of the same name edited by his brother Robert Barrère.
- "Framed" – an obscure Leiber and Stoller song, covered here by the original four-piece line-up of Little Feat in 1969.
- "China White" – a Lowell George demo from 1978 featuring among others Jim Keltner (drums) David Foster (piano) and guitar work by Fred Tackett (who would later join Little Feat when they reformed in 1988).

Three of the live numbers ("Skin It Back", "Red Streamliner" and "Teenage Nervous Breakdown") were recorded in August 1977 at the Lisner Auditorium in Washington DC for the live Waiting For Columbus album. These were later included on the 2002 and 2022 deluxe editions of that album. The performance of "Red Streamliner" features Michael McDonald and Patrick Simmons of the Doobie Brothers on backing vocals. "The Fan" was recorded live at Ultrasonic Studios in Hempstead, New York on September 19, 1974.

== Track listing ==
Side one
No.	Title	Writer(s)	Length
1.	"Rocket In My Pocket" (Acoustic Demo)	Lowell George	0:51
2.	"Rock And Roll Doctor" (Alternate Version)	George, Fred Martin	3:11
3.	"Skin It Back" (Live from Lisner Auditorium)	Paul Barrère	4:42
4.	"Easy To Slip" (Original Sailin' Shoes version)	George	3:19
5.	"Red Streamliner" (Live from Lisner Auditorium)	Bill Payne, Fran Tate	5:00

Side two
No.	Title	Writer(s)	Length
6.	"Lonesome Whistle" (Lowell George Demo)	Hank Williams, Jimmie Davis	3:13
7.	"Front Page News" (Original Melody)	Payne, George	4:51
8.	"The Fan" (1974 Live Version)	Payne, George	6:16
9.	"Forty-Four Blues" (Original First Album Version)	Chester Burnett	3:20

Side three
No.	Title	Writer(s)	Length
10.	"Teenage Nervous Breakdown" (Original 1969 Demo)	George	1:27
11.	"Teenage Nervous Breakdown" (Live from Lisner Auditorium)	George	3:46
12.	"Framed" (Lowell George and The Factory)	Jerry Leiber, Mike Stoller	2:44
13.	"Strawberry Flats" (Original First Album Version)	Payne, George	2:21
14.	"Gringo"	Payne	6:36

Side four
No.	Title	Writer(s)	Length
15.	"Over The Edge"	Barrère	4:20
16.	"Two Trains" (1973 Live Version)	George	3:19
17.	"China White"	George	3:14
18.	"All That You Dream" (from Lowell George Tribute Concert, featuring Linda Ronstadt)	Barrère, Payne	4:50
19.	"Feets Don't Fail Me Now" (1976 Live Extract)	Barrère, George, Martin	1:54

== Personnel ==
=== Band members ===
- Paul Barrère – vocals, guitar
- Sam Clayton – backing vocals, congas
- Lowell George – vocals, guitar
- Kenny Gradney – bass
- Richie Hayward – backing vocals, drums
- Bill Payne – vocals, keyboards

== Charts ==
Chart (1981)	Peak position
Australian Albums (Kent Music Report)	99
UK Albums (OCC)	76
US Billboard 200	39
