= Thanks, I'll Eat It Here =

Thanks I'll Eat It Here

Studio album by Lowell George
- Released: March 2, 1979
- Studio: Sunset Sound, Los Angeles
- Genre: Roots rock, southern rock, blues rock, swamp rock, R&B
- Length: 33:47
- Label: Warner Bros.
- Producer: Lowell George

Professional ratings
Review scores
Source	Rating
Allmusic	4.5/5 stars
Christgau's Record Guide	C+

Thanks I'll Eat It Here is the only solo album by American rock and roll singer-songwriter Lowell George, released in 1979.

While George is best known for his work with Little Feat, by 1977 Lowell felt that they were moving increasingly into jazz-rock, a form in which he felt little interest. As a result, he began working on his own album. Thanks I'll Eat It Here is an eclectic mix of styles reminiscent of Little Feat's earlier albums – in particular Dixie Chicken, on which the track "Two Trains" originally appeared.

The album was released four months before George's death and has cover art by Neon Park, who created artwork for most Little Feat albums.

== Track listing ==
Side one
No.	Title	Writer(s)	Length
1.	"What Do You Want the Girl to Do"	Allen Toussaint	4:46
2.	"Honest Man"	Lowell George, Fred Tackett	3:45
3.	"Two Trains"	George	4:32
4.	"I Can't Stand the Rain"	Ann Peebles, Don Bryant, Bernie Miller	3:21

Side two
No.	Title	Writer(s)	Length
5.	"Cheek to Cheek"	George, Van Dyke Parks, Martin Kibbee	2:23
6.	"Easy Money"	Rickie Lee Jones	3:29
7.	"Twenty Million Things"	George, Jed Levy	2:50
8.	"Find a River"	Tackett	3:45
9.	"Himmler's Ring"	Jimmy Webb	2:28

CD bonus track
No.	Title	Writer(s)	Length
10.	"Heartache" (with Valerie Carter)	George, Ivan Ulz	2:28

== Cover art ==
The cover, painted by Neon Park, is a satire of Édouard Manet's famous painting Le déjeuner sur l'herbe which shows Bob Dylan, Fidel Castro and Marlene Dietrich dressed as her character in the film Der Blaue Engel; an open copy of the poem Howl is beside them.

== Personnel ==
Although they do not play together on any single track, Richie Hayward and Bill Payne, both members of Little Feat, play on the album. George was also able to call on the services of top-class session players and backing vocalists.

- Lowell George – vocals, guitar, production
- Bill Payne – keyboards, vocals
- James Newton Howard – keyboards
- David Foster – keyboards
- Nicky Hopkins – keyboards
- Jimmy Greenspoon – piano
- David Paich – keyboards
- Gordon DeWitty – keyboards, piano
- Maxine Dixon – piano
- Bruce Paulson – keyboards
- Peggy Sandvig – piano
- Fred Tackett – guitar, vocals
- Turner Stephen Bruton – guitar
- Dean Parks – guitar
- Luis Damian – guitar
- Roberto Gutierrez – guitar, vocals
- Ron Koss – guitar, engineering
- Chuck Rainey – bass guitar
- Paul Stallworth – bass guitar
- Dennis Belfield – bass guitar
- Richie Hayward – drums
- Jim Keltner – drums
- Jim Gordon – drums
- Michael Baird – drums
- Jeff Porcaro – drums
- Floyd Sneed – drums, vocals
- Chilli Charles – drums
- Jerry Jumonville – saxophone
- Joel Peskin – saxophone
- John Phillips – saxophone
- Jim Price – horns
- Darrell Leonard – horns
- Denny Christianson – horns
- Steve Madaio – horns
- James Self – tuba
- Bobby Bruce – violin
- Arthur Gerst – harp
- Maxayn Lewis – vocals
- Herb Pedersen – vocals
- Bonnie Raitt – vocals
- JD Souther – vocals
- Maxine Waters Willard – vocals

=== Additional personnel ===
- Brad Kanawyer, Michael Hollyfield – design
- Neon Park – cover art
- Elizabeth George, Bob Marks, Nancy Goldfarb – photography
- Donn Landee, George Massenburg – engineering
- Billy Youdelman, Bruce Botnick, Doug Botnick – assistant engineering
- Richard Hayward, Lee Herschberg – digital mastering
- Michael Ward – truck driver and drum tech
- Gene Vano – road manager

== Charts ==
Album

Year	Chart	Position
1979	Billboard Pop Albums	71
1979	Australian (Kent Music Report)	100
