= Sailin' Shoes =

Studio album by Little Feat
- Released: February 1972
- Recorded: Late 1971
- Studios: Amigo Sounds, Sunset Sound; TTG Studios, Los Angeles
- Length: 38:00
- Label: Warner Bros.
- Producer: Ted Templeman

Little Feat chronology
Little Feat (1971)	Sailin' Shoes (1972)	Dixie Chicken (1973)

Professional ratings
Review scores
Source	Rating
AllMusic	5/5 stars
Christgau's Record Guide	B+
The Encyclopedia of Popular Music	4/5 stars
Rolling Stone	(favorable)

Sailin' Shoes is the second studio album by the American rock band Little Feat, released in 1972. Produced by Ted Templeman, it marked a shift away from the sound of the band's eponymous debut, to that of their subsequent album, Dixie Chicken. It also introduced the cover artwork of Neon Park to the group, and was the last album appearance of original bassist Roy Estrada.

== Music and recording ==
The music of Sailin' Shoes is a mixture of pop, rock, blues and country. Highlighted by a reworked group version of "Willin'", the album also featured such enduring tracks as "A Apolitical Blues," "Easy to Slip" and the title track, all by guitarist and lead vocalist Lowell George, the second co-written with Martin Kibbee, credited as "Fred Martin", a former band-mate from The Factory, and the first appearance of the "George/Martin" credit on a Little Feat record. The track "Texas Rose Cafe" is a tribute to a post-Houston concert visit by Lowell George and others to the hippie restaurant/club/beer garden. During refreshments upstairs George had said that he liked the place so much that he was going to write a song about it and it would be on their next album. It turned out to be true and not just so much "beer talk".

It was the last full Little Feat record to be produced by an outsider, until 1977's Time Loves a Hero, with each of the three interim albums being produced almost entirely by Lowell George. Noted Los Angeles-based session percussionist Milt Holland played percussion on "Easy to Slip" and "Trouble" and he also played tabla on the follow-up album Dixie Chicken. Ron Elliott of the Beau Brummels played rhythm guitar on "A Apolitical Blues" and Debbie Lindsey provided the female vocals on "Cold, Cold, Cold" and the title track.

== Artwork ==
With his design for a "sailing shoe" of a cake swinging on a tree swing, the album's front cover by Neon Park seems to be an allusion to The Swing by painter Jean-Honoré Fragonard. Park himself said of the cover: "The Sailin' Shoes cover was inspired by Louis XIV. I'd just seen Rossellini's film about Louis XIV. And it seemed to relate a lot to Hollywood. A situation ruled by someone who kept everybody under his thumb by keeping them in hock from buying fancy clothes seemed to relate to Hollywood somehow. Actually, the only thing that was missing was the Hollywood sign, which I was going to put in the background. I thought that would be gauche. But I had a chance to pick up on that later with The Last Record Album.” The cover design also includes a giant snail and Mick Jagger dressed as Gainsborough's The Blue Boy as Park had been inspired by the film Performance.

== Reception ==
It was voted number 469 in the third edition of Colin Larkin's All Time Top 1000 Albums (2000). In 2008 the album was released as Gold CD by Mobile Fidelity Sound Lab.

Record World said that "Easy to Slip" "features passionate vocal harmonies and one of the finest rhythm sections that ever rocked."

== Cover versions ==
"Willin'" has been covered numerous times by various artists.

- In 1972, Van Dyke Parks covered "Sailin' Shoes" on his album Discover America.
- In 1973, the Scottish hard rock band Nazareth covered "Teenage Nervous Breakdown" on their album Loud 'n' Proud.
- In 1974, backed by the Meters and Lowell George, Robert Palmer covered "Sailin' Shoes" on his debut solo album Sneakin' Sally Through the Alley.
- In 1975, Robert Palmer covered "Trouble" on his album Pressure Drop.
- In 1977, Bob Weir covered "Easy to Slip" on his solo release Heaven Help the Fool.
- In 1988, Van Halen recorded a cover of "A Apolitical Blues" on their album, OU812, although the song is not included on cassette and vinyl copies of the album.
- In 2022, the Black Crowes recorded a cover of "Easy to Slip" on their covers EP, 1972.

== Track listing ==
All tracks are written by Lowell George, except where noted.

Side one
No.	Title	Writer(s)	Length
1.	"Easy to Slip"	George, Fred Martin	3:22
2.	"Cold, Cold, Cold"		4:01
3.	"Trouble"		2:19
4.	"Tripe Face Boogie"	Richie Hayward, Bill Payne	3:16
5.	"Willin'"		2:57
6.	"A Apolitical Blues"		3:28

Side two
No.	Title	Writer(s)	Length
7.	"Sailin' Shoes"		2:53
8.	"Teenage Nervous Breakdown"		2:13
9.	"Got No Shadow"	Payne	5:08
10.	"Cat Fever"	Payne	4:37
11.	"Texas Rose Café"		3:42

Note: All songs are sung by Lowell George, except "Cat Fever" sung by Bill Payne

=== Deluxe edition ===
A remastered and expanded edition of Sailin' Shoes was released on June 23, 2023. This new edition is a 2-CD set, with the original album on disc one, and bonus material on disc two labeled as Hotcakes, Outtakes & Rarities. Tracks 12 to 21 were recorded live and labeled as Thank You! I’ll Eat It Here.

Disc one - Original Album 2023 Remaster
No.	Title	Length

Disc two - Hotcakes, Outtakes, Rarities & Thank You! I’ll Eat It Here: Live at the Palladium, Los Angeles, CA 8/28/71
No.	Title	Writer(s)	Length
1.	"Sailin' Shoes" (Demo)	George	2:57
2.	"Easy To Fall (Easy To Slip)" (Demo for The Doobie Brothers)	George & Martin	2:41
3.	"Texas Rose Cafe" (Demo for The Doobie Brothers)	George	3:24
4.	"Cold, Cold, Cold" (Alternate Version)	George	4:17
5.	"Roto/Tone"	Elliot Ingber	4:07
6.	"A Apolitical Blues" (Alternate Version)	George	3:46
7.	"Boogie - Tripe Face Boogie"	Payne, Hayward	3:58
8.	"Trouble" (Alternate Version)	George	2:23
9.	"Doriville"	George	2:44
10.	"Willin'" (Alternate Version)	George	3:00
11.	"Easy To Slip" (Mono Single Version)	George & Martin	3:22
12.	"Tripe Face Boogie"	Payne, Hayward	4:30
13.	"Hamburger Midnight"	George, Roy Estrada	3:41
14.	"Cat Fever"	Payne	5:19
15.	"Willin'"	George	4:06
16.	"Strawberry Flats"	Payne, George	3:11
17.	"Got No Shadow"	Payne	5:08
18.	"Texas Rose Cafe"	George	4:05
19.	"Snakes On Everything"	Payne	4:18
20.	"Hot Rod (Eldorado Slim)"	Payne, George, Hayward. Estrada	5:08
21.	"Teenage Nervous Breakdown"	George	3:01

== Personnel ==
Little Feat

- Lowell George - guitar, harmonica, baritone saxophone, drum machine, lead vocals
- Bill Payne - Hammond organ, Wurlitzer electric piano, piano, accordion, lead ("Cat Fever") & backing vocals
- Roy Estrada - bass, backing vocals
- Richie Hayward - drums, percussion, backing vocals

Additional

- Milt Holland - percussion on "Easy to Slip" and "Trouble"
- Sneaky Pete Kleinow - pedal steel guitar on "Willin'" and "Texas Rose Café"
- Debbie Lindsey - backing vocals on "Cold Cold Cold" and "Sailin' Shoes"
- Ron Elliott - rhythm guitar on "A Apolitical Blues"
