= Feats Don't Fail Me Now =

Studio album by Little Feat
- Released: August 9, 1974
- Recorded: Early 1974
- Studios: Blue Seas (Hunt Valley, Maryland); The Sound Factory and Sunset Sound (Los Angeles); Warner Bros. (North Hollywood)
- Genres: Country-funk; rock and roll
- Length: 34:18
- Label: Warner Bros.
- Producers: Lowell George (tracks 1–4 and 6–8), Van Dyke Parks (track 5)

Little Feat chronology
Dixie Chicken (1973)	Feats Don't Fail Me Now (1974)	The Last Record Album (1975)

Singles from Feats Don't Fail Me Now
- 1. "Oh Atlanta" Released: 1974; 2. "Spanish Moon" Released: 1975

Professional ratings
Review scores
Source	Rating
AllMusic	4/5 stars
Christgau's Record Guide	B
The Encyclopedia of Popular Music	4/5 stars

Feats Don't Fail Me Now is the fourth studio album by the American rock band Little Feat, released in 1974, on the Warner Bros. label. The cover was designed by Neon Park.

According to Richie Hayward, "Wait Till the Shit Hits the Fan" dates back to their debut but the band had had trouble recording it on the previous two albums, due to its irregular 7/8 meter. It was scrapped until the sessions for this album when it was recorded live in the studio as "The Fan"; the original version appeared on the 2000 boxed set Hotcakes & Outtakes: 30 Years Of Little Feat.

In 2000 the album was voted number 718 in Colin Larkin's All Time Top 1000 Albums.

== Track listing ==
Side one
No.	Title	Writer(s)	Lead vocals	Length
1.	"Rock & Roll Doctor"	Lowell George, Martin Kibbee		2:57
2.	"Oh Atlanta"	Bill Payne	Bill Payne	3:26
3.	"Skin it Back"	Paul Barrère	Paul Barrère	4:11
4.	"Down the Road"	George		3:46
5.	"Spanish Moon"	George		3:01

Side two
No.	Title	Writer(s)	Length
1.	"Feats Don't Fail Me Now"	Barrère, George, Martin Kibbee	2:27
2.	"The Fan"	George, Payne	4:30
3.	"Medley: Cold Cold Cold/Tripe Face Boogie"	George, Richie Hayward, Payne	10:00

Note: All songs are sung by Lowell George, except where noted.

=== Deluxe edition ===
A remastered and expanded edition of Feats Don't Fail Me Now was released on June 14, 2024. This new edition is a 3-CD set, with the original album on disc one, bonus material on disc two, labeled as Hotcakes, Outtakes & Rarities, and live content on disc three, labeled as If You Bought It, A Truck Brought It.

Disc one - Original Album 2024 Remaster
No.	Title	Length

Disc two - Hotcakes, Outtakes & Rarities
No.	Title	Writer(s)	Length
1.	"Brickyard Blues"	Allen Toussaint	3:00
2.	"Brickyard Blues" (Alternate Version)	George, Kibbee, Barrère	2:30
3.	"Rock and Roll Doctor" (Alternate Version)	George, Kibbee	3:24
4.	"Spanish Moon" (Alternate Version)	George	3:44
5.	"Skin It Back" (Alternate Version)	Barrère	4:34
6.	"Oh Atlanta" (Alternate Version)	Payne	3:36
7.	"All That You Dream" (Outtake)	Barrère, Payne	3:33
8.	"Front Page News" (Alternate Version)	Payne	4:57
9.	"Long Distance Love" (Outtake)	George	2:53
10.	"Lonesome Whistle" (Alternate Version)	Hank Williams, Jimmie Davis	3:47
11.	"Day at the Dog Races" (Outtake)	Payne, Kenny Gradney, Barrère, Richie Hayward, Sam Clayton	3:12
12.	"Spanish Moon" (Single Version)	George	2:41

Disc three - If You Bought It, A Truck Brought It: Live at L’Olympia, Paris, FR, February 3, 1975
No.	Title	Length
1.	"On Your Way Down"	6:51
2.	"Skin It Back"	5:30
3.	"Fat Man In The Bathtub"	5:55
4.	"Rock And Roll Doctor"	4:05
5.	"Oh Atlanta"	3:55
6.	"Medley: Cold Cold Cold / Dixie Chicken / Tripe Face Boogie"	19:52
7.	"Willin’"	4:15
8.	"Teenage Nervous Breakdown"	3:44

== Personnel ==
=== Little Feat ===
- Lowell George – guitar, lead vocals
- Paul Barrere – guitar, lead vocals ("Skin It Back"), backing vocals
- Bill Payne – keyboards, lead vocals ("Oh Atlanta"), backing vocals
- Sam Clayton – percussion, backing vocals
- Kenny Gradney – bass
- Richie Hayward – drums, backing vocals

=== Additional ===
- Gordon DeWitty – clavinet ("Spanish Moon")
- Fred White – drums ("Spanish Moon")
- Emmylou Harris – backing vocals
- Bonnie Raitt – backing vocals
- Fran Tate – backing vocals
- Tower of Power – horns

== Charts ==
Chart (1974-75)	Peak position
Australian Albums (Kent Music Report)	73
Canada Top Albums/CDs (RPM)	40
US Billboard 200	30

Chart (2024)	Peak position
Scottish Albums (Official Charts)	51

== Certifications ==
Region	Certification	Certified units/sales
United Kingdom (BPI)	Silver	60,000^{^}
United States (RIAA)	Gold	500,000^{^}
^{^} Shipments figures based on certification alone.
