= 1972 (EP) =

EP by The Black Crowes
- Released: May 4, 2022
- Genre: Rock
- Length: 26:56
- Label: Silver Arrow Records
- Producer: Chris Robinson, Rich Robinson

The Black Crowes chronology
Wiser for the Time (2013)	1972 (2022)	Happiness Bastards (2024)

1972 is a studio EP by American rock band the Black Crowes, released on May 4, 2022. It is an album of cover songs.

== Recording ==
Brothers Chris and Rich Robinson, who reformed the Black Crowes in 2019, thought an album of cover songs would be a good step toward releasing an album of new material. Rolling Stone notes: "As the Robinson brothers attempt to rebuild their creative partnership, the sessions were like 'good baby steps' for them, Chris says, 'a less-pressure situation' than new songs." The Black Crowes plan to begin recording an album of new material in January 2023.

The EP contains covers of rock songs from 1972: the Rolling Stones's "Rocks Off", T. Rex's "The Slider", Rod Stewart's "You Wear It Well", Little Feat's "Easy to Slip", David Bowie's "Moonage Daydream", and the Temptations' "Papa Was a Rollin' Stone".

== Track listing ==
1. "Rocks Off" (Mick Jagger, Keith Richards) – 4:31
2. "The Slider" (Marc Bolan) – 3:49
3. "You Wear It Well" (Rod Stewart, Martin Quittenton) – 4:52
4. "Easy to Slip" (Lowell George, Fred Martin) – 3:29
5. "Moonage Daydream" (David Bowie) – 5:03
6. "Papa Was a Rollin' Stone" (Norman Whitfield, Barrett Strong) – 5:12

== Personnel ==
The Black Crowes

- Chris Robinson – vocals, harmonica
- Rich Robinson – guitars, vocals
- Sven Pipien – bass, vocals

Other musicians

- Isaiah Mitchell – guitars
- Joel Robinow – keyboards, vocals
- Brian Griffin – drums
- Mackenzie Adams – background vocals

== Reception ==
Gary Graff of UltimateClassicRock states that "The sextet's affinity for the material wins out, the Crowes' genuine appreciation and respect for the material resulting in more than rote remakes." He further states that "1972 is a welcome placeholder, an inclusive and engaging party that opens up a little more of the Crowes' rock 'n' roll heart."

== Charts ==
Chart performance for 1972
Chart (2022)	Peak position
UK Independent Albums (OCC)	13
