= On My Own Two Feet =

Studio album by Paul Barrère
- Released: 1983
- Studio: Axis Sound Studio, Atlanta, Georgia; George Massenburg Studios
- Genre: Blues rock, southern rock, hard rock, swamp rock, funk rock, jazz fusion
- Length: 36:21
- Label: Mirage Records
- Producer: Jeff Glixman, Paul Barrère

Paul Barrère chronology
On My Own Two Feet (1983)	Real Lies (1984)

Professional ratings
Review scores
Source	Rating
AllMusic	3/5 stars

On My Own Two Feet is the 1983 debut album by Little Feat guitarist/vocalist Paul Barrère, recorded during the period when Little Feat were disbanded (1979–87). It features Steve Walsh from Kansas, Barrère's erstwhile Little Feat colleague Bill Payne and Keith Knudsen and Bobby LaKind from The Doobie Brothers.

The song Fool For You was originally recorded by Fuller and Kaz in 1978. Its writer, Craig Fuller would join the reformed Little Feat in 1987.

High Roller had previously been recorded in a jazzier form by Little Feat on their 1977 album Time Loves a Hero.

== Track listing ==
All songs written by Paul Barrère except where noted

1. "Sweet Coquette"
2. "High Roller"
3. "Fool For You" (Craig Fuller)
4. "Love Sweet Love"
5. "Who Knows For Sure" (Paul Barrère/Tom Snow)
6. "She Lays Down The Beat"
7. "Fortune Cookie"
8. "Along This Lane" (Paul Barrère/Bill Payne/Dennis Morgan)

== Personnel ==
- Paul Barrère - guitar, bass, mandolin, percussion, vocals
- Andy West - bass
- Bobby LaKind - percussion
- Keith Knudsen - vocals
- T Lavitz - keyboards
- Bill Payne - keyboards
- Steve Walsh - keyboards
- Rod Morgenstein, Ferrel Gummit - drums
- Bill Bergman, David Stout, Greg Smith, Jerome Jumonville, Jim Coile, John Berry, Lee Thornburg - horns
