= Scott Sharrard =

American singer-songwriter

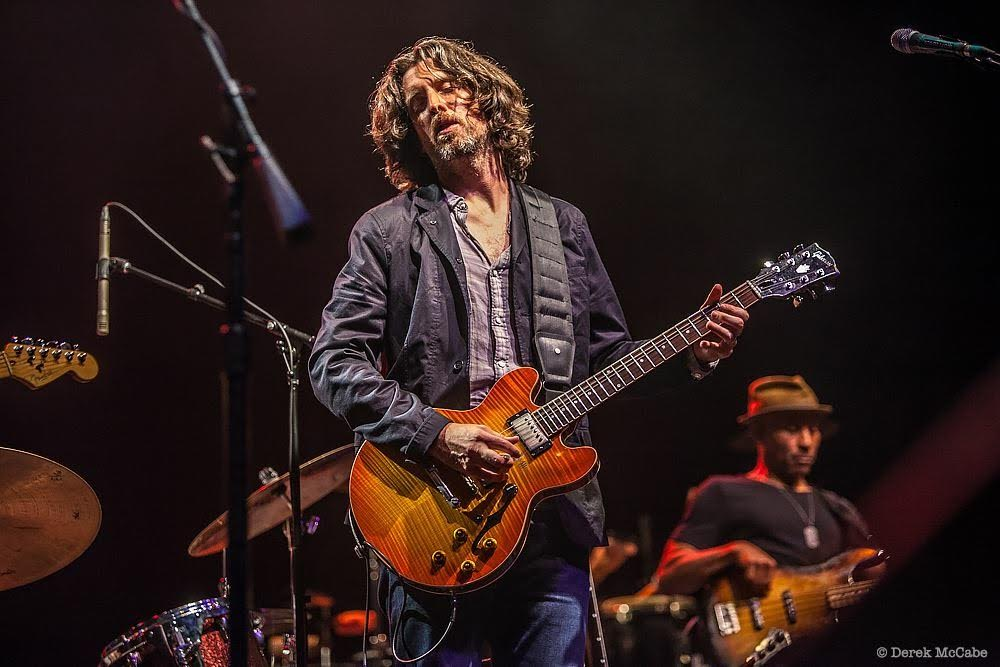
- Scott with the Gregg Allman Band at the Laid Back Festival, Jones Beach Theater, August 29, 2015

Background information
- Born: December 28, 1976 (age 49); Dearborn, Michigan, United States
- Genres: Rock, soul, blues-rock
- Occupations: Musician, songwriter, musical director
- Instruments: Guitar; vocals
- Years active: 1984–present
- Website: scottsharrard.com

Scott Sharrard (born December 28, 1976) is an American musician, known as the lead guitarist and musical director of the Gregg Allman Band. A prolific songwriter and talented singer, he has also released several soul-influenced albums of his own including three with his first band, the Chesterfields, followed by six albums under his own name. In 2020, Sharrard was announced as a new member of Little Feat following the death of Paul Barrere.

== Early life ==
Born and raised in Michigan, United States, Sharrard often cites his father, also a guitarist and singer-songwriter, as his earliest influence. He began his musical career studying jazz at the High School for the Arts in Milwaukee, Wisconsin, during the day and earning his stripes by playing and singing with local and visiting leading musicians such as Clyde Stubblefield, Willie Higgins, Harvey Scales, Buddy Miles, Luther Allison, and Hubert Sumlin by night.

== New York ==
After high school, Scott Sharrard and core members of his band The Chesterfields moved their home base to New York City and eventually garnered critical acclaim for their live shows and studio recordings.

After they disbanded in 2002, Sharrard continued to write and record on his own as well as collaborating in the New York City and Hudson Valley areas with a tightknit group of musicians that includes bassist Jeff "The Claw" Hanley, drummer Diego Voglino and multi-instrumentalists Moses Patrou and Jay Collins, longtime saxophonist for the Gregg Allman Band who eventually got Sharrard an audition. In 2013, they went into the studio and recorded an album as 'Scott Sharrard & the Brickyard Band' and play around New York and other places along the East Coast when Sharrard is not working with the Gregg Allman Band.

In 2011, Sharrard also joined forces with drummer/vocalist Randy Ciarlante (The Band, Levon Helm) and Hammond B-3 player Bruce Katz (Gregg Allman Band, John Hammond, Delbert McClinton) to form a blues/soul/rock power trio called CKS, and played several shows in the New York City and Hudson Valley areas.

== Gregg Allman Band ==
Scott Sharrard joined the Gregg Allman Band as lead guitarist in 2008 after auditioning by sitting in with the Allman Brothers Band at a show in Camden, New Jersey. Two of Scott's original songs have been performed by the Gregg Allman Band, "Endless Road" and "Love Like Kerosene". With Gregg Allman, in 2017 Sharrard co-wrote the song "My Only True Friend", the first track of Allman's last and posthumously issued studio album Southern Blood. It was also issued as a single. Sharrard wrote the song in the voice of Gregg's late brother, Duane Allman, as if speaking to him.

== Discography ==
- Dawnbreaker (2005)
- Analog/Monolog (2008)
- Ante Up (2009)
- Scott Sharrard & The Brickyard Band (2012)
- Saving Grace (2018)
- Rustbelt (2021)
