= Southern Blood =

Southern Blood may refer to:

- Southern Blood (book), a 2003 speculative fiction anthology edited by Bill Congreve
- Southern Blood (album), a 2017 album by Gregg Allman
