= Down on the Farm (album) =

Studio album by Little Feat
- Released: November 14, 1979
- Studios: Wally Heider's Studio 3 (Hollywood); Lowell George's house (Topanga Canyon); Paramount Ranch (Agoura Hills)
- Genre: Rock
- Length: 37:28
- Label: Warner Bros.
- Producer: Lowell George

Little Feat chronology
Waiting for Columbus (1978)	Down on the Farm (1979)	Hoy-Hoy! (1981)

Down on the Farm is the seventh studio album by the American rock band Little Feat. The album was completed and released shortly after the death of the band's founder and frontman, Lowell George, in 1979. It was their last original work for nine years. The band had announced their break-up in June 1979 during the making of the album. Little Feat would reform in 1987.

The cover shows one of Neon Park's several duck-girls—an allusion to "The Finishing Touch" by painter Gil Elvgren.

== Critical reception ==
Professional ratings
Review scores
Source	Rating
AllMusic	2/5 stars
Christgau's Record Guide	C+
The Rolling Stone Album Guide	3/5 stars

The New York Times wrote that "it's very much an album of songs, with none of the longish solos and other experiments that often seemed out of place on Little Feat albums in the past."

== Track listing ==
Side one

1. "Down on the Farm" (Gabriel Barrère, Paul Barrère) – 4:16 (lead singer: Paul Barrère)
2. "Six Feet of Snow" (Lowell George, Keith Godchaux) – 2:30 (lead singer: Lowell George)
3. "Perfect Imperfection" (Barrère, Tom Snow) – 3:46 (lead singer: Lowell George)
4. "Kokomo" (George) – 2:58 (lead singer: Lowell George)
5. "Be One Now" (George, Fred Tackett) – 4:05 (lead singer: Lowell George)

Side two

1. "Straight from the Heart" (George, Bill Payne) – 4:59 (lead singer: Lowell George)
2. "Front Page News" (George, Payne) – 5:57 (lead singer: Lowell George)
3. "Wake Up Dreaming" (Payne, Fran Payne) – 4:09 (lead singer: Bill Payne)
4. "Feel the Groove" (Clayton, Gordon DeWitty) – 4:49 (lead singer: Sam Clayton)

== Personnel ==
Band members

- Lowell George – guitar, lead (2–6) & backing vocals
- Paul Barrère – guitar, lead (1) & backing vocals
- Bill Payne – keyboards, synthesizer, lead (7, 8) & backing vocals
- Sam Clayton – congas, lead (9) & backing vocals
- Kenny Gradney – bass
- Richie Hayward – drums, backing vocals

Additional personnel

- Rosemary Butler – backing vocals
- Gordon DeWitty – keyboards
- Robben Ford – guitar
- Jerry Jumonville – saxophone
- Sneaky Pete Kleinow – pedal steel guitar
- David Lindley – guitar
- Earl Palmer – drums ("Feel the Groove")
- Fran Payne – backing vocals
- Bonnie Raitt – backing vocals
- Dan Smith – backing vocals
- Fred Tackett – guitar (solo on "Kokomo")
- Lee Thornburg – trumpet, trombone
- Julia Waters – backing vocals
- Luther Waters – backing vocals
- Oren Waters – backing vocals
- Maxine Willard Waters – backing vocals

== Charts ==
Chart (1979-80)	Peak position
Australian Albums (Kent Music Report)	41
Canada Top Albums/CDs (RPM)	90
New Zealand Albums (RMNZ)	19
UK Albums (Official Charts)	46
US Billboard 200	29
