= Lowell George =

American musician and founder of Little Feat (1945–1979)

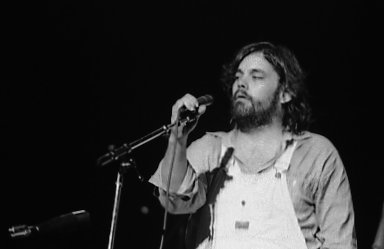
- George performing in Buffalo, New York, in 1977

Background information
- Born: Lowell Thomas George; April 13, 1945; Los Angeles, California, US
- Died: June 29, 1979 (aged 34) Marriott Motor Hotel Twin Bridges, Arlington, Virginia, US
- Genres: Rock; roots rock; swamp rock; jam band
- Occupations: Musician; songwriter; producer
- Instruments: Guitar; vocals; harmonica; flute; saxophone; sitar
- Years active: 1965-1979
- Label: Warner Bros.
- Formerly of: Little Feat; Frank Zappa band; The Mothers of Invention; The Standells
- Website: littlefeat.net

Lowell Thomas George (April 13, 1945 – June 29, 1979) was an American musician, singer-songwriter, multi-instrumentalist, and record producer. He was the original frontman, primary guitarist, vocalist, and songwriter for the rock band Little Feat. Before forming Little Feat, he was a member of Frank Zappa's band the Mothers of Invention.

== Early life ==
Lowell George was born in Los Angeles, California, the son of Willard H. George, a furrier who raised chinchillas and supplied furs to the movie studios.

George's first instrument was the harmonica. At age 6, he appeared on Ted Mack's Original Amateur Hour performing a duet with his older brother, Hampton. As a student at Hollywood High School (where he first befriended future bandmate Paul Barrere and second wife Elizabeth Levy), he took up the flute in the school marching band and orchestra. He started to play Hampton's acoustic guitar at age 11, progressed to the electric guitar by his high school years, and later learned to play the saxophone, shakuhachi and sitar.

During this period, George viewed the teen idol-oriented rock and roll of the era with contempt, instead favoring West Coast jazz and the soul jazz of Les McCann and Mose Allison. Following graduation in 1963, he briefly worked at a gas station (an experience that inspired such later songs as "Willin'") to support himself while studying art and art history at Los Angeles Valley College for two years.

== Musical career ==
=== Early bands ===
Initially funded by the sale of his grandfather's stock, George's first band, The Factory, formed in 1965 and released the single "Smile, Let Your Life Begin" (co-written by George). Members included future Little Feat drummer Richie Hayward (who replaced Dallas Taylor in September 1966); Martin Kibbee (a.k.a. Fred Martin), who later co-wrote several Little Feat songs with George (including "Dixie Chicken" and "Rock and Roll Doctor"); and Warren Klein on guitar. Frank Zappa produced two tracks for the band, but they were not released until 1993 on the album Lightning-Rod Man, credited to Lowell George and The Factory. The band made an appearance on the 1960s sitcom F Troop as The Bedbugs. They also were featured in an episode of Gomer Pyle, U.S.M.C., titled "Lost, the Colonel's Daughter" (season 3, episode 27). They received credit at the end of the episode as "'The Factory' Lowell-Warren-Martin-Rich, Courtesy of Universal Records". Following the disbanding of The Factory, George briefly joined The Standells.

=== Zappa and The Mothers of Invention ===
In November 1968, George joined Zappa's Mothers of Invention as rhythm guitarist and nominal lead vocalist; he can be heard on Weasels Ripped My Flesh, Burnt Weeny Sandwich, You Can't Do That on Stage Anymore, Vol. 1, You Can't Do That on Stage Anymore, Vol. 4 and the first disc of You Can't Do That on Stage Anymore, Vol. 5. During this period, he absorbed Zappa's autocratic leadership style and avant garde-influenced conceptual/procedural-oriented compositional methods. He earned his first production credit (in conjunction with Zappa and Russ Titelman) on Permanent Damage, an album recorded by "groupie group" The GTOs. George later asserted that "he performed no real function in the band" and left the group in May 1969 under nebulous circumstances. GTOs member Pamela Des Barres has claimed that George was fired by Zappa for smoking marijuana, and George claimed at a 1975 Little Feat concert that he was fired because he "wrote a song ["Willin'"] about dope." On the other hand, biographer Mark Brend asserts that Zappa liked the song but thought there was no place for it in the Mothers' set; George alternatively claimed that "it was decided that I should leave and form a band" by mutual agreement. George also claimed to have played uncredited guitar on Hot Rats.

=== Little Feat ===
After leaving the Mothers of Invention, George invited a contingent of fellow musicians (including former Zappa bassist Roy Estrada, keyboardist Bill Payne, and drummer Richie Hayward) to form a new band, which they named Little Feat. George usually (but not always) played lead guitar and focused on slide guitar, but Ry Cooder played the slide on "Willin'" on the debut Little Feat album after George badly injured his hand while working on a powered model airplane; George rerecorded some of his material, and he played the rest of the slide work on the album. Mark Brend wrote that George's "use of compression defined his sound and gave him the means to play his extended melodic lines." George began playing slide with the casing of a Sears, Roebuck, and Co. Craftsman 13/16" spark plug socket that was given to him by a friend—Steve, whom he had met from New Hampshire—rather than the traditional glass or steel finger tube. (Spark plugs came in two sizes at the time: 13/16" and, later, 5/8"; the former was universal during George's time.)

Little Feat signed to Warner Bros. Records through Zappa's efforts, and their first album was Little Feat, produced by Russ Titelman, but it was not a commercial success and only sold 11,000 copies on initial release.

The follow-up album, Sailin' Shoes, produced by Ted Templeman, was the band's first record to feature cover artwork by Neon Park, but despite good reviews, the album fared no better commercially.

"On Your Way Down"
written by Allen Toussaint, from the 1973 Little Feat album Dixie Chicken

Estrada left the band in 1972 to join Captain Beefheart's Magic Band as well as to get away from the pollution in Los Angeles; he was replaced on bass by Kenny Gradney. In addition, Little Feat expanded to a sextet by adding a second guitarist Paul Barrere and percussionist Sam Clayton, thus cementing the classic line-up, and they took on a New Orleans funk direction with their album Dixie Chicken, the first to be produced by George.

By Spring1976, Little Feat were touring North America opening for The Who.

Little Feat released several other studio albums in the 1970s, including Feats Don't Fail Me Now, The Last Record Album, and Time Loves a Hero. The group's 1978 live album Waiting for Columbus became their best-selling album to date. Down on the Farm was their last album to feature George, and was released shortly after his death in 1979.

Tensions within the group, especially among George, Payne, and, to a lesser extent, Barrere regarding musical direction and leadership, led to Payne and Barrere's departure from the group in 1979 and the group's subsequent disbandment. In an interview with Bill Flanagan, conducted 11 days before his death, George stated that he was keen to re-form Little Feat without Payne and Barrere in order to reassert his full control over the group.

=== Record production ===
George was also a producer and produced the Grateful Dead's 1978 album Shakedown Street as well as Little Feat's records and his own 1979 solo album Thanks, I'll Eat It Here; he also co-produced a couple of tracks on Valerie Carter's 1977 release Just a Stone's Throw Away. In 1977, he co-produced John Starling's debut solo album Long Time Gone.

=== Session work ===
When not playing with Little Feat, George was a session player to various artists, most frequently as a slide guitarist. He contributed to Barbara Keith's 1972 self-titled debut, John Cale's Paris 1919 (1973), Happy End's Happy End (1973), Bonnie Raitt's Takin' My Time (1973; "I Feel the Same" and "Guilty"), Harry Nilsson's Son of Schmilsson (1973; "Take 54"), James Taylor's Gorilla (1975; "Angry Blues"), The Meters' Rejuvenation (1974; "Just Kissed My Baby"), John Sebastian's Tarzana Kid (1974), and Jackson Browne's The Pretender (1976).

Along with The Meters, George's slide work features prominently on Robert Palmer's studio album Sneakin' Sally Through the Alley, recorded in New Orleans in 1974. A year later, Palmer's album Pressure Drop was produced by George, and Little Feat served as the core band on the sessions. However, Palmer kept the producer's credit because of a dispute between Island Records and Warner Brothers. Later CDs list Steve Smith as producer. He is named in the credits as a soundtrack musician on the 1970 film Performance starring Mick Jagger. The soundtrack includes extensive acoustic slide guitar credited primarily to Ry Cooder.

== Personal life ==
Lowell met Susan Taylor (nickname Jonna) during his days with The Factory. They had Lowell's first child, Forrest Sylvester George, in March 1969. George and his first wife, Pattie Price, had a son, Luke, in April 1970. They divorced, and he became involved with Elizabeth Levy. They had a daughter, Inara George, in July 1974; the couple married in 1976. Inara is half of the musical duo The Bird and the Bee.

George was stepfather to Levy's son Jed Levy from her previous marriage to Tom Levy.

=== Health ===
George led an overindulgent lifestyle of binge eating, alcoholism and speedballs (heroin and cocaine mixed together), and he became morbidly obese in the last years of his life, weighing 308 pounds (139.7 kg).

== Death ==
On June 15, 1979, George began a tour in support of his solo album Thanks I'll Eat it Here. On June 29, the morning after an appearance at Washington, D.C.'s Lisner Auditorium, where the bulk of Waiting for Columbus had been recorded in 1977, George collapsed and died of a heart attack caused by an accidental heroin overdose in his hotel room at the Twin Bridges Marriott in Arlington, Virginia. George's body was cremated in Washington, D.C. on August 2. His ashes were flown to Los Angeles, where they were scattered from his fishing boat into the Pacific Ocean.

Fred Tackett said "We were driving down the New Jersey Turnpike in this bus, and we stopped at this pizza joint off the highway. Everybody in the band shared a cheese pizza, but Lowell bought a large pizza with everything on it, carried it to the back of the bus, and he ate the entire pizza by himself. He died two or three days later. So, when people ask me 'What really killed Lowell?' I say 'It was a pizza on the New Jersey Turnpike.'"

== Posthumous tributes and cover songs ==
- A benefit concert for George's family was held on August 4, 1979, shortly after his death, at the Forum in Los Angeles, featuring Little Feat, Linda Ronstadt, Bonnie Raitt, Craig Fuller, Emmylou Harris, Jackson Browne, Nicolette Larson. and others.
- The song "Ride Like the Wind" on the 1979 self-titled debut album by Christopher Cross was dedicated to George.
- Jackson Browne memorialized George in his song "Of Missing Persons" on his 1980 album Hold Out. The song was dedicated to George's daughter Inara George, who is part of the musical duo The Bird and the Bee. Browne described George as "the Orson Welles of rock".
- In 1980, singer-songwriter Cris Williamson dedicated the song "When Anger Takes the Wheel" to Lowell George on her album Strange Paradise.
- In 1983, the British poet Sean O'Brien included a poem "For Lowell George" in his collection The Indoor Park.
- In 1988, American rock band Van Halen covered "A Apolitical Blues" as the closing track for their album OU812.
- In 1997, the CD Rock-n-Roll Doctor – A Tribute to Lowell George was released featuring various artists performing versions of George's songs, including Jackson Browne, JD Souther, Bonnie Raitt, Eddie Money, Randy Newman, Keisuke Kuwata, and Inara George. It was reissued on vinyl by Omnivore Recordings in 2026 for Record Store Day.
- Chris and Rich Robinson covered "Roll Um Easy" on their 2007 album Brothers of a Feather: Live at the Roxy as well as covering "Willin'" as a B-side on The Black Crowes' Croweology acoustic double album.
- Kevin Breit included his song "Lowell" on the 2007 Sisters Euclid album Faith Cola.
- American jam band Phish played all the songs from Little Feat's double album Waiting for Columbus during their traditional Halloween "Musical Costume" on October 31, 2010 in Atlantic City, New Jersey.
- Arlen Roth recorded "Dixie Chicken" in tribute to George on his Slide Guitar Summit album with Lee Roy Parnell in 2013.
- Gregg Allman recorded "Willin'" for his album Southern Blood in 2017.
- Joey Landreth of The Bros. Landreth released a collection of covers by Lowell George and Little Feat, titled All That You Dream in 2021.
- In 2024 Long Distance Love - a Sweet Relief Tribute to Lowell George was released, which included 24 covers by Lowell George and Little Feat, including one by his daughter Inara George.

Awards
Preceded by Jerry Garcia	AMA presidents Award; 2009	Succeeded by Not Yet Awarded
