= Song for Adam =

Song by Jackson Browne

from the album Jackson Browne
- Released: January 2, 1972
- Recorded: 1971
- Studio: Crystal Sound, Hollywood
- Genre: Folk rock
- Length: 5:22
- Label: Asylum
- Songwriter: Jackson Browne
- Producer: Richard Sanford Orshoff

"Song for Adam" is a song written and performed by American singer-songwriter Jackson Browne. It is the third track on his self-titled debut album, Jackson Browne, released in 1972.

== Origin ==
On the surface it tells of the mournful memory of a friend of Browne's, Adam Saylor, who died in 1968, possibly by suicide. Wordplay and themes in the lyrics make allusions to mankind and Browne's place in this lost mankind, playing off of the name "Adam" and its religious connotations, and the use of candle as a metaphor for life's journey: "Now the story's told that Adam jumped, but I'm thinking that he fell..." Instrumentally, it contains a soft acoustic guitar part interlaced throughout by a viola line.

According to Russell Paris's Jackson Browne website, Saylor was "a friend of Greg Copeland's with whom Jackson and Greg drove to New York in early 1967." Paris had become a staff writer for Elektra Records' publishing company, Nina Music, in addition to reporting on musical events in New York City with his friends Copeland and Saylor. "From New York," according to Paris, "Greg and Adam went to Europe and Adam continued traveling the world until the autumn of 1968 when he either fell or jumped from a hotel in Bombay (Mumbai), India."

When we parted we were laughing still, as our goodbyes were said
And I never heard from him again as each our lives we led –
Except for once in someone else's letter that I read –
Until I heard the sudden word that a friend of mine was dead.

An officially released live version of Jackson Browne singing the song exists on Nina Gerber's Live - Good Music With Good People from 2007. Browne introduces the song saying "Well, it wouldn't be a set from me if it didn't have at least ... one song about death and despair..."

== Reception ==
Jeff Walker, upon reviewing Jackson Browne in Phonograph Record on the album's release, said of "Song for Adam" that it is "a simple song about a friend's death; an often-used theme, but rarely expressed in such spiritual terms."

"Even the meticulously structured requiem 'Song for Adam' interests me more for the quality of Browne's concern than for its philosophical conclusions," noted Robert Christgau.

== Cover versions ==
- Kiki Dee - Loving & Free, 1973.
- Larry Norman - Streams of White Light Into Darkened Corners, 1977.
- Maria del Mar Bonet - A version was released 1998 in Catalan by the Majorcan singer. It appeared on the tribute compilation Cántame Mis Canciones.
- Penny Nichols - Colors of the Sun: Penny Nichols Sings the Early Songs of Jackson Browne, 2012.
- Gregg Allman - Southern Blood, 2017, Featuring Jackson Browne.
