= The Last Record Album =

- Cover artwork, with giant orange jelly, by Neon Park

Studio album by Little Feat
- Released: October 17, 1975
- Recorded: 1975
- Studios: The Sound Factory, Los Angeles
- Length: 38:17
- Label: Warner Bros.
- Producer: Lowell George

Little Feat chronology
Feats Don't Fail Me Now (1974)	The Last Record Album (1975)	Time Loves a Hero (1977)

The Last Record Album is the fifth studio album by the American rock band Little Feat, released in 1975 on the Warner Bros. label.

== Background ==
The album title and cover illustration by Neon Park both allude to the 1971 film The Last Picture Show as well as the title typography on the film's poster, with Hollywood Boulevard turned into a desert leading to the apparent visual pun of the Hollywood Sign Jell-O mold "dessert". At left, Frederick's of Hollywood has long since closed, but the famous Grauman's Chinese Theatre at right is still a landmark.

The album's back cover includes the record's lyrics. One song, "High Roller," was marked out in black ink with the annotation "Maybe Next Time". The song was indeed included on their next album Time Loves a Hero (1977) as "Hi Roller".

== Reception ==
Professional ratings
Review scores
Source	Rating
AllMusic	3/5 stars
Christgau's Record Guide	B−
The Encyclopedia of Popular Music	4/5 stars
Rolling Stone	(not rated)

Reviewing the album for AllMusic, Stephen Thomas Erlewine wrote, "For a very short album – only eight songs – too many of the cuts fall flat. Those that succeed, however, are quite good, particularly Paul Barrère and Bill Payne's gently propulsive 'All That You Dream,' Lowell George's beautiful 'Long Distance Love,' and the sublime 'Mercenary Territory' .... There are enough signs of Little Feat's true character on The Last Record Album – the three previously mentioned songs are essential for any Feat fan – to make it fairly enjoyable, but it's clear that the band is beginning to run out of steam."

The track "Long Distance Love" was placed at number 26 in John Peel's 1976 "Festive Fifty". The album was voted number 555 in the third edition of Colin Larkin's All Time Top 1000 Albums (2000).

Writing for The Guardian in 2010, after the death of Richie Hayward, Adam Sweeting commented:

The Last Record Album (1975) was a less cohesive effort, but continued the group's upward commercial progress. In hindsight, there is bleak irony in the way George chose to decorate the album's sleeve with the medical bills racked up by Hayward following a serious motorcycle accident ... During his final illness, when he had moved to Canada, Hayward's lack of medical insurance left him facing huge bills for treatment.

== Cover versions ==
- Carly Simon recorded a version of "One Love Stand" for her 1976 album Another Passenger.
- Elvis Costello recorded a version of "Long Distance Love" for the 2024 album Long Distance Love: A Sweet Relief Tribute to Lowell George by various artists.

== Track listing ==
Side one
No.	Title	Writer(s)	Lead vocals	Length
1.	"Romance Dance"	Paul Barrère, Kenny Gradney, Bill Payne	Payne, Barrère	3:49
2.	"All That You Dream"	Barrère, Payne	Lowell George	3:52
3.	"Long Distance Love"	George	George	2:43
4.	"Day or Night"	Payne, Fran Tate	Payne, Barrère	6:24

Side two
No.	Title	Writer(s)	Lead vocals	Length
5.	"One Love Stand"	Barrère, Gradney, Payne	George	4:26
6.	"Down Below the Borderline"	George	George	3:41
7.	"Somebody's Leavin"	Payne	Payne	5:07
8.	"Mercenary Territory"	George, Richie Hayward, Elizabeth George	Lowell George	4:27

=== Deluxe edition ===
A remastered and expanded edition of The Last Record Album was released on October 24, 2025. This new edition is a 4-CD set, with the original album on disc one, bonus material on disc two, labeled as Hotcakes, Outtakes & Rarities, and live content on disc three and four, labeled as Hellzapoppin’.

Disc one - Original Album 2025 Remaster
No.	Title	Length

Disc two - Hotcakes, Outtakes & Rarities
No.	Title	Length
1.	"Down Below the Borderline" (Demo)	1:54
2.	"Rockin’ Shoes 1 & 2" (Demo)	2:33
3.	"Fool On The Avenue" (Demo)	2:38
4.	"All That You Dream" (Alternate Version)	4:23
5.	"Mercenary Territory" (Alternate Version)	4:33
6.	"Long Distance Love" (Alternate Version)	2:47
7.	"Romance Dance" (Alternate Version)	4:12
8.	"High Roller" (2025 Remaster)	3:37
9.	"Day Or Night (Instrumental)" (Rough Mix)	7:07
10.	"Front Page News" (Outtake)	4:45
11.	"Long Distance Love" (Rough Mix)	2:32
12.	"All That You Dream" (Single Version)	3:33

Disc three - Hellzapoppin’: Live at the Orpheum Theatre, Boston, MA 10/31/75
No.	Title	Length
1.	"Two Trains"	4:20
2.	"Skin It Back"	5:41
3.	"Fat Man In The Bathtub"	6:02
4.	"Walkin’ All Night"	4:24
5.	"A Political Blues"	3:28
6.	"Oh Atlanta"	4:25
7.	"On Your Way Down"	6:46
8.	"Day Or Night"	7:23
9.	"All That You Dream"	4:32

Disc four - Hellzapoppin’: Live at the Orpheum Theatre, Boston, MA 10/31/75
No.	Title	Length
1.	"Romance Dance"	4:56
2.	"Long Distance Love"	2:41
3.	"Medley: Cold, Cold, Cold / Dixie Chicken / Tripe Face Boogie / Bag Of Reds / Tripe Face Boogie (Reprise)"	20:25
4.	"Willin’"	5:23
5.	"Teenage Nervous Breakdown"	3:39
6.	"Spanish Moon"	4:53

== Personnel ==
Source: The Last Record Album, Warner Bros. Records – K 56156, & BS 2884, 1975, liner notes.

=== Little Feat ===
- Lowell George – guitar, lead (2, 3, 5, 6, 8) & backing vocals
- Paul Barrère – guitar, lead (1, 4) & backing vocals
- Bill Payne – keyboards, synthesizer, lead (1, 4, 7) & backing vocals
- Sam Clayton – congas
- Kenny Gradney – bass
- Richard Hayward – drums, backing vocals

=== Additional musicians ===
- John Hall – guitar ("All That You Dream")
- Linda Ronstadt – backing vocals (“All That You Dream”)
- Valerie Carter – backing vocals ("Long Distance Love" and "One Love Stand")
- Fran Tate – backing vocals ("Long Distance Love" and "One Love Stand")

=== Production ===
- Lowell George – producer
- George Massenburg – engineer
- Neon Park – cover artwork

== Charts ==
Chart (1975-76)	Peak position
Australian Albums (Kent Music Report)	51
Dutch Albums (Album Top 100)	16
Finnish Albums (The Official Finnish Charts)	29
New Zealand Albums (RMNZ)	36
UK Albums (Official Charts)	36
US Billboard 200	36

Chart (2025)	Peak position
Hungarian Physical Albums (MAHASZ)	11
Scottish Albums (Official Charts)	59

== Certifications ==
Region	Certification	Certified units/sales
United Kingdom (BPI)	Silver	60,000^{^}
^{^} Shipments figures based on certification alone.
