= Rejuvenation (The Meters album) =

Studio album by the Meters
- Released: July 1974
- Recorded: Sea-Saint
- Genre: Funk; swamp rock
- Length: 44:08
- Label: Reprise (MS 2200)
- Producer: Allen Toussaint, the Meters

The Meters chronology
Cabbage Alley (1972)	Rejuvenation (1974)	Fire on the Bayou (1975)

Rejuvenation is the fifth studio album by the New Orleans funk group the Meters. It was released in 1974. In 2003, the album was ranked number 138 on Rolling Stone magazine's list of the 500 greatest albums of all time, and 139 in a 2012 revised list.

== Background ==
The Meters cut their first three mostly instrumental albums with Josie Records, before signing with Reprise and recording 1972's Cabbage Alley, their first album to feature mostly vocal songs and arrangements. Rejuvenation is the follow-up album. It was produced by Allen Toussaint and recorded at his brand new Sea-Saint Studios in New Orleans. Some of the songs on the album include horn section arrangements by Toussaint.

The front cover artwork features a photograph of a woman sitting on a couch alongside several record albums strewn about her living room, such as Allen Toussaint's 1972 Life, Love and Faith as well as the Meters' own previous LP Cabbage Alley.

== Reception ==
Professional ratings
Review scores
Source	Rating
AllMusic	4.5/5 stars
Christgau's Record Guide	B+
Rolling Stone	4.5/5 stars

Stephen Erlewine of AllMusic called it "a first-class funk album" and noted the album's rock influences and its hard-edged funk. Robert Christgau had a positive view and singles out the two tracks "It Ain't No Use" and "Just Kissed My Baby" as highlights. Jon Pareles of Rolling Stone called the album "a high point of 1970s funk". He noted the sparse spacing of the music and stylistic influences from Mardi Gras, gospel, R&B and country. Daryl Easlea of BBC Music called the music a "merger of funk and swamp rock" and said the album is "the epitome of groove-laden, hook-rich, in-your-face funk." He singled out "Africa" and "It Ain't No Use" as highlights.

== Influence and cover songs ==
The album's influence is detectable in the work of a number of artists who have performed renditions of its songs. The Red Hot Chili Peppers did a modified version of the song "Africa" on their album Freaky Styley. Throughout their version, the word "Africa" is changed to "Hollywood" and "Mother Land" is changed to "Brother Land". The third track, "Just Kissed My Baby", is used in Grand Theft Auto IV on the funk radio station "IF99 (International Funk)". The song is sampled on Public Enemy's "Timebomb" from the album Yo! Bum Rush the Show. Chris Duarte did a rendition of "Just Kissed My Baby" on Texas Sugar/Strat Magik. He has also covered "People Say" live. Vdelli covered "Just Kissed My Baby" on the album Out of the Blues. New Orleans' The Dirty Dozen Brass Band covered "Africa" on their Medicated Magic album. The Grateful Dead regularly performed "Hey Pocky A-Way" in their concerts in the late 1980s. Widespread Panic regularly cover "It Ain't No Use" and have played and still play "Just Kissed My Baby" many times. George Porter, Jr. has sat in with Widespread Panic a number of times, most recently at their annual "Panic en la Playa Siete" destination shows. The 01/28/2018 show at Riviera Maya, MX featured George on bass & vocals performing "It Ain't No Use".

== Track listing ==
All tracks are written by Ziggy Modeliste, Art Neville, Leo Nocentelli, George Porter, Jr.

No.	Title	Length
1.	"People Say"	5:18
2.	"Love Is for Me"	3:55
3.	"Just Kissed My Baby"	4:43
4.	"What'cha Say"	3:29
5.	"Jungle Man"	3:26
6.	"Hey Pocky A-Way"	4:06
7.	"It Ain't No Use"	11:51
8.	"Loving You Is on My Mind"	3:19
9.	"Africa"	4:01

2001 digitally remastered CD bonus tracks
No.	Title	Length
10.	"People Say" (Single Version)	3:11
11.	"Hey Pocky A-Way" (Single Version)	3:27

== Personnel ==
Credits adapted from AllMusic, with added vocal credits.

The Meters

- Ziggy Modeliste – drums, composer, producer, vocals
- Art Neville – keyboards, composer, producer, vocals
- Leo Nocentelli – guitar, composer, producer, background vocals
- George Porter Jr. – bass, composer, producer, background vocals

with:

- Lowell George – slide guitar on "Just Kissed My Baby"

Production

- Allen Toussaint – producer
- Tim Livingston – project manager
- Bob Irwin – mastering
- Al Quaglieri – mastering
- Ken Laxton – engineer
- Rich Russell – design
- Bunny Matthews – liner notes
