= Willard H. George =

American furrier (1889–1956)

- Born: July 20, 1889; Lincoln, Nebraska, US
- Died: October 24, 1956 (aged 67)
- Education: Manual Arts High School
- Occupation: Furrier
- Children: Lowell George

Willard Hampton George (July 20, 1889 – October 24, 1956) was an American furrier based in Los Angeles, California. He designed, created, and supplied furs to the Hollywood movie studios from the 1920s onwards.

George designed and created furs for Hollywood actresses including Lucille Ball, Greta Garbo, and Rita Hayworth.

His former showroom at 3300 Wilshire Boulevard was being restored to its original Art Deco appearance as of 2017.

== Early life ==
Willard H. George was born to Sadie Kiel George and was a great-grandson of Conrad Kiel, an early settler of Las Vegas and owner of the Kyle Ranch in Las Vegas. He was born in Lincoln, Nebraska, on July 20, 1889, but grew up in Los Angeles, where he attended Manual Arts High School.

== Career ==
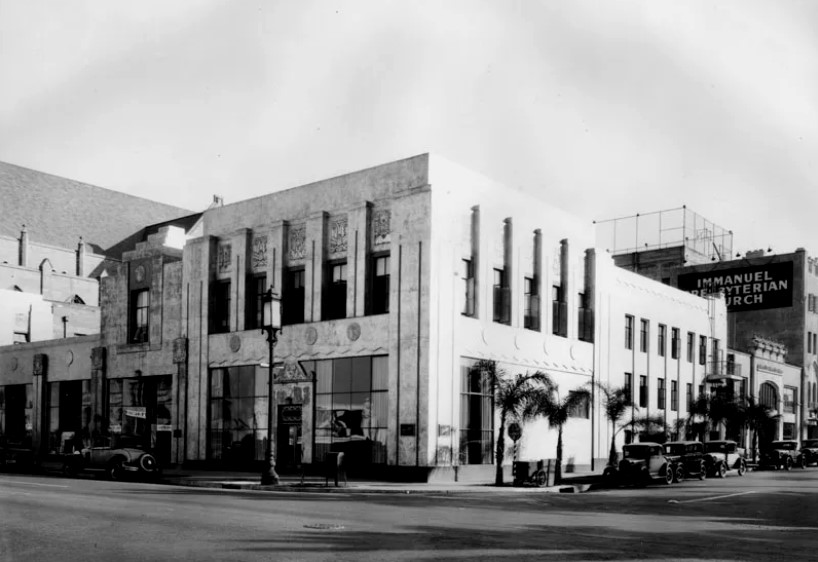
The Willard H. George showroom

In 1910, George was employed as a furrier at a Los Angeles retail store. By 1918, he owned and operated Willard H. George Limited, designing and selling furs at 701 West 7th Street in central Los Angeles.

From 1929 to the 1950s, George ran his business from the Art Deco Willard H. George building at 3330 Wilshire Boulevard, on the corner with South Catalina Street, now known as the Koreatown district of Los Angeles. Afterwards, the building was home to the piano retailer Sherman Clay and Company for many years, but had been vacant since 2010, with plans to demolish it. As of 2017, it is being restored with the false wall hiding the original 1920s facade removed, and the wide sweeping 1950s staircase reinstated. George used the staircase as a runway for his models to show the furs to customers, rather than using in-store displays.

George designed and created furs for Hollywood actresses including Lucille Ball, Rita Hayworth, and Greta Garbo. He was known as "The Chinchilla Industry's Greatest Friend" after he created a grading system for chinchilla fur that was adopted throughout the United States and endorsed by the National Chinchilla Breeders Board in 1947.

== Personal life ==
He was the father of the musician Lowell George, who worked with Frank Zappa and was the founder, vocalist and guitarist of Little Feat.

George died on October 24, 1956.
