= Uncle Sam's =

Live album by Gregg Allman Band
- Released: September 20, 2024
- Recorded: July 1, 1983
- Venue: Uncle Sam's
- Genre: Rock
- Length: 52:30
- Label: Sawrite Records

Gregg Allman chronology
Southern Blood (2017)	Uncle Sam's (2024)	One Night in DC: May 15, 1984 (2025)

Uncle Sam's is a live album by the Gregg Allman Band, a rock group led by Gregg Allman. It was recorded on July 1, 1983, at Uncle Sam's in Hull, Massachusetts. It was released on September 20, 2024.

In 1982, the Allman Brothers Band broke up for the second time. Subsequently Gregg Allman formed the Gregg Allman Band, and played many live shows at smaller concert venues. The group featured two other former members of the Allman Brothers Band – Dan Toler on guitar, and Frankie Toler on drums.

== Critical reception ==
On jambands.com, Larson Sutton said, "... [Dan] Toler establishes himself as a player of dexterity and taste, and a discernible influence from his years with [Dickey] Betts.... Refreshingly, Allman employs a horn section that sharpens the corners around his superb vocals... As a first archival release from Allman’s personal vault, it's a great choice."

In Glide Magazine, Doug Collette wrote, "... the detail in the sound of this unfortunately uncredited recording impresses no end.... Not only does [the album] preserve for posterity the high standards Gregg Allman set for himself as a working musician and performer under his name, but it also lends credence to a perception that he was, in fact, the soul of the band to which he gave his surname."

== Track listing ==
1. "Midnight Rider" (Gregg Allman, Robert Kim Payne)
2. "Dreams" (Gregg Allman)
3. "Sweet Feelin'" (Candi Staton, Clarence Carter, Marcus Daniel, Rick Hall)
4. "Hot 'Lanta" (Duane Allman, Gregg Allman, Dickey Betts, Jai Johanny Johanson, Berry Oakley, Butch Trucks)
5. "Queen of Hearts" (Gregg Allman)
6. "Trouble No More" (McKinley Morganfield)
7. "Don't Keep Me Wonderin'" (Gregg Allman)
8. "Melissa" (Gregg Allman, Stephen Alaimo)
9. "Statesboro Blues" (Willie McTell)

== Personnel ==
- Gregg Allman – lead vocals, Hammond B-3 organ, acoustic guitar
- Dan Toler – lead guitar
- Frankie Toler – drums
- Greg Voorhess – bass
- Bruce Waibel – guitar
- Chaz Trippy – percussion
- Donn Finney – saxophone, flute
- Larry Finney – trumpet
