= Dixie Chicken =

Studio album by Little Feat
- Released: January 25, 1973
- Recorded: Late 1972
- Studios: Clover, Los Angeles; Warner Bros., North Hollywood; Sunset Sound, Los Angeles
- Genres: Swamp rock; funk rock; New Orleans R&B
- Length: 36:12
- Label: Warner Bros.
- Producer: Lowell George

Little Feat chronology
Sailin' Shoes (1972)	Dixie Chicken (1973)	Feats Don't Fail Me Now (1974)

Singles from Dixie Chicken
- 1. "Dixie Chicken" Released: 1973

Professional ratings
Review scores
Source	Rating
AllMusic	5/5 stars
Christgau's Record Guide	B+

Dixie Chicken is the third studio album by the American rock band Little Feat, released in 1973, on Warner Bros. Records. The artwork for the front cover was by illustrator Neon Park and is a reference to a line from the album's third song, "Roll Um Easy".

The album is considered their landmark album with the title track as their signature song that helped further define the Little Feat sound. The band added two members (guitarist Paul Barrere and percussionist Sam Clayton) to make the more complete and familiar line-up that continued until their 1979 breakup following the death of Lowell George. Bassist Kenny Gradney was brought in to replace original bassist Roy Estrada, who had left after the band's second album, Sailin' Shoes, to join Captain Beefheart's Magic Band. This new line-up radically altered the band's sound, leaning toward New Orleans R&B/funk.

It was voted number 563 in Colin Larkin's All Time Top 1000 Albums 3rd Edition (2000).

The title track was released as a single by Warner Bros. in March 1973 in the U.S., backed with "Lafayette Railroad" (WB 7689) and in February 1975 in the UK, backed with "Oh Atlanta" (K 16524).

== Track listing ==
All tracks are written by Lowell George, except where noted.

Side one
No.	Title	Writer(s)	Length
1.	"Dixie Chicken"	George, Fred Martin	3:55
2.	"Two Trains"		3:06
3.	"Roll Um Easy"		2:30
4.	"On Your Way Down"	Allen Toussaint	5:31
5.	"Kiss It Off"		2:56

Side two
No.	Title	Writer(s)	Length
6.	"Fool Yourself"	Fred Tackett	3:10
7.	"Walkin' All Night"	Paul Barrère, Bill Payne	3:35
8.	"Fat Man in the Bathtub"		4:29
9.	"Juliette"		3:20
10.	"Lafayette Railroad" (instrumental)	George, Payne	3:40

Note: All songs are sung by Lowell George, except "Walkin' All Night" sung by Paul Barrère.

=== Deluxe edition ===
A remastered and expanded edition of Dixie Chicken was released on June 23, 2023. This new edition is a 2-CD set, with the original album on disc one, and bonus material on disc two, labeled as Hotcakes, Outtakes & Rarities. Tracks 10 to 16 are a live recording labeled as Icepick Eldorado.

Disc one - Original Album 2023 Remaster
No.	Title	Length

Disc two - Hotcakes, Outtakes, Rarities & Icepick Eldorado: Live at Paul’s Mall, Boston, MA 4/1/73
No.	Title	Writer(s)	Length
1.	"Two Trains" (Demo)	George	3:19
2.	"Fat Man in the Bathtub" (Demo)	George	3:58
3.	"Walkin' All Night" (Alternate Version)	Payne, Barrere	3:40
4.	"Roll Um Easy" (Alternate Version)	George	2:36
5.	"On Your Way Down" (Alternate Version)	Toussaint	5:57
6.	"Eldorado Slim"	Payne, George	4:42
7.	"Juliette" (Alternate Version)	George	3:34
8.	"Hi Roller (Ace in the Hole)"	Barrere	2:28
9.	"Dixie Chicken" (Alternate Version)	George, Martin	4:06
10.	"Two Trains"	George	3:23
11.	"Got No Shadow"	Payne	6:53
12.	"On Your Way Down"	Toussaint	6:26
13.	"Walkin' All Night"	Payne, Barrere	3:34
14.	"Fat Man in the Bathtub"	George	5:31
15.	"Willin'"	George	4:31
16.	"A Apolitical Blues"	George	3:33

== Personnel ==
=== Little Feat ===
- Lowell George – guitar, cowbell, flute, lead vocals
- Paul Barrere – guitar, co-lead vocals ("Walkin' All Night"), backing vocals
- Bill Payne – keyboards, synthesizer, co-lead vocals ("Walkin' All Night"), backing vocals
- Sam Clayton – congas
- Kenny Gradney – bass
- Richie Hayward – drums, backing vocals

=== Additional personnel ===
- Fred Tackett – guitar, mandolin, trumpet
- Bonnie Bramlett – backing vocals
- Malcolm Cecil – synthesizer
- Tret Fure – backing vocals
- Danny Hutton – backing vocals
- Milt Holland – tabla
- Gloria Jones – backing vocals
- Debbie Lindsey – backing vocals
- Bonnie Raitt – backing vocals
- Stephanie Spruill – backing vocals
- Neon Park – cover art

== Charts ==
Chart (2023)	Peak position
Scottish Albums (Official Charts)	25

== Certifications ==
Region	Certification	Certified units/sales
United Kingdom (BPI) 2001 release	Silver	60,000^{^}
United States (RIAA)	Gold	500,000^{^}
^{^} Shipments figures based on certification alone.
