= My Only True Friend =

Song by Gregg Allman

from the album Southern Blood
- Released: July 26, 2017 (single); September 8, 2017 (album)
- Recorded: March 2016
- Studio: FAME Studios (Muscle Shoals, Alabama)
- Genre: Southern rock
- Length: 6:16
- Label: Rounder
- Songwriters: Gregg Allman, Scott Sharrard
- Producer: Don Was

My Only True Friend is the first track on Southern Blood, the last studio album by the American singer-songwriter Gregg Allman, released posthumously on September 8, 2017, by Rounder Records. It is the only original song on the album and was co-written by Allman with the guitarist and bandleader Scott Sharrard, forming the album's lead single.

The song has the theme of time running out at the end of life. Allman was ill at the time and died on May 27, 2017, not long after the recording. Allman repeats the lyric "I hope you're haunted by the music of my soul, when I'm gone" throughout the song. Sharrard secretly wrote the song in the voice of Gregg's late brother, Duane Allman, speaking to him. The rest of the album consists of cover songs.

A video of Allman and other musicians is associated with the song. The song has been called "hauntingly beautiful".
