= Southern Blood (album) =

Studio album by Gregg Allman
- Released: September 8, 2017
- Recorded: March 2016
- Studio: FAME Studios (Muscle Shoals, Alabama)
- Genre: Southern rock; blues; soul
- Length: 45:44 (58:18 w/bonus tracks)
- Label: Rounder
- Producer: Don Was

Gregg Allman chronology
Gregg Allman Live: Back to Macon, GA (2015)	Southern Blood (2017)	Uncle Sam's (2024)

Singles from Southern Blood
- 1. "My Only True Friend" Released: July 26, 2017

Southern Blood is the eighth and final studio album by American singer-songwriter Gregg Allman, released on September 8, 2017, by Rounder Records, four months after Allman's death. Following the release of his seventh album, Low Country Blues (2011), Allman continued to tour and released a memoir, My Cross to Bear, in 2012. However, that same year, he was diagnosed with liver cancer. His output and schedule in the intervening years gradually slowed, and Southern Blood, recorded in March 2016, became his final album. He and his backing band recorded the album with producer Don Was at FAME Studios in Muscle Shoals, Alabama over a period of nine days.

The set is heavy on covers, including songs originally performed by Bob Dylan, the Grateful Dead, Tim Buckley and Jackson Browne, who guests on the album's final song, "Song for Adam". The songs were picked as they each held meaning for Allman, and told a story. He had initially planned to include more original songs, but was too ill to complete them. The album's only original song, "My Only True Friend", was co-written by guitarist and bandleader Scott Sharrard, and was released as the album's lead single. Upon its release, Southern Blood attracted critical acclaim.

== Background ==
Southern Blood is Allman's final album, and followed years of health setbacks. Following a liver transplant in 2010, he was diagnosed with liver cancer in 2012 but continued to play music. He had planned to record a sequel of sorts to Low Country Blues, using the backing musicians he recorded with on that album, that did not come to fruition. Southern Blood was initially planned to be Allman's first of all original material, and was tentatively titled All Compositions By Gregg Allman. However, his health problems and touring schedule impeded this, which led to him and manager Michael Lehman picking out songs to cover that held "deep meaning for [him]. When Gregg picked them, he knew where he was in his life's journey. He was already further along with the progression of his disease."

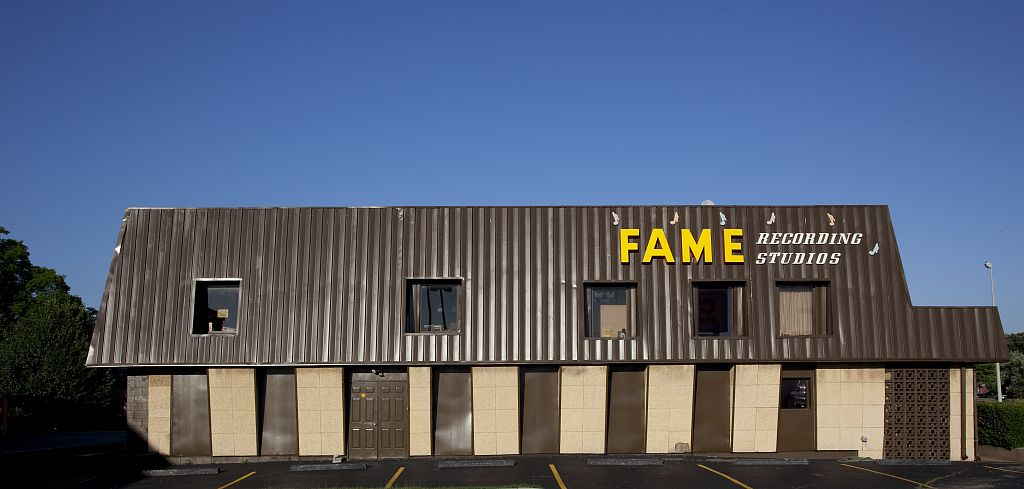
The album was recorded at FAME Studios in Muscle Shoals, Alabama.

The album was recorded over nine days in March 2016 with producer Don Was at FAME Studios in Muscle Shoals, Alabama. The album was recorded with his then-current backing band; he enjoyed being able to showcase the talents of his band, which he was enormously proud of. FAME held great history for Allman as one of his first groups, Hour Glass, recorded there, as did his brother Duane as a session musician in the late 1960s. Due to his health, Allman could only work for about four hours—so two songs were recorded each day. Was stated the album subtly crafts a farewell mood: "It was kind of unspoken, but it was really clear we were preparing a final statement, in many ways." Allman did not complete vocal tracks for two finished backing tracks for Freddie King's "Pack It Up" and Leon Russell's "Hummingbird", which were both left off the release. In addition, he had planned to record his harmony overdubs, but was too ill to do so, leading to Buddy Miller taking the role instead. Allman and Was had discussed creating an album with the same spirit as Laid Back (1973), Allman's debut solo album.

== Composition ==
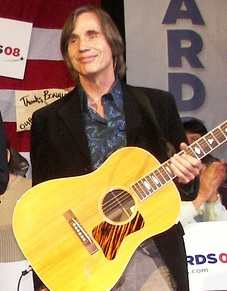
Allman's longtime friend Jackson Browne sings backing vocals on his own "Song for Adam"

Despite the album's posthumous release, producer Don Was was reluctant to call Southern Blood "an album about dying [...] Gregg was explaining his life and making sense of it, both for the fans who stood with him for decades, and for himself." The album's opening song, "My Only True Friend", carries themes of time running out. Allman repeats the lyric "I hope you're haunted by the music of my soul, when I'm gone" throughout the song. He co-wrote the song with his bandleader, Scott Sharrard, who secretly wrote the song in the voice of Gregg's late brother, Duane Allman, speaking to him. The rest of the album is composed of cover songs, beginning with "Once I Was", originally performed by Tim Buckley. Allman would often sing the song when with Sharrard, who urged him to record it. Allman was initially unsure about doing a version of the Grateful Dead's "Black Muddy River", as he felt his personal writing style was so different from the group, but warmed to it when recording it.

Allman chose to cover "Blind Bats and Swamp Rats" by Johnny Jenkins because Duane had once played with him. The album closes with "Song for Adam", written by Allman's longtime friend Jackson Browne, who also provides harmony vocals on the track. Allman previously recorded a demo of the song in 1974; it was included on the 1997 compilation One More Try: An Anthology. He related the song's lyrics to the death of Duane. He got emotional when singing the lyric "Still it seems he stopped singing in the middle of his song," and was unable to finish it; it appears on the final album in an incomplete form. Ronald Hart of Billboard felt the album contained a modern country music sound: "you can’t exactly figure out if it's the influence of such acolytes as Eric Church and Jamey Johnson on Allman, or the other way around."

== Release ==
Southern Blood was set originally for a January 2017 release, but was delayed due to Allman's health. He then chose an early September release date, as he did not want the album to compete with bigger-name artists who typically release albums later in the year. Allman spent the last night before he died approving final mixes for Southern Blood. He died on May 27, 2017.

Upon the album's release, three live events, titled Southern Blood: Celebrating Gregg Allman, were held featuring friends and associates of Allman discussing the album in three of Allman's favorite cities. The first was held on September 7, 2017, at the Grammy Museum's Clive Davis Theater in Los Angeles, and the second at the Big House Museum in Macon, Georgia. The Macon event attracted hundreds of fans, and the mayor of Macon, Robert Reichert, proclaimed Allman's December 8 birthday as Gregg Allman Day in the city. The third event is set for Country Music Hall of Fame and Museum's Ford Theater in Nashville, Tennessee as a part of Americanafest.

== Critical reception ==
Professional ratings
Aggregate scores
Source	Rating
Metacritic	82/100
Review scores
Source	Rating
AllMusic	4/5 stars
American Songwriter	4.5/5 stars
The Independent	4/5 stars
Newsday	3.5/4 stars
Rolling Stone	3.5/5 stars
USA Today	3.5/4 stars

Southern Blood was nominated for Best Americana Album at the 60th Annual Grammy Awards (2017). Southern Blood received critical acclaim from music critics. At Metacritic, which assigns a normalized rating out of 100 to reviews from mainstream critics, the album has an average score of 82 out of 100, which indicates "universal acclaim" based on six reviews. AllMusic's Thom Jurek considered it "almost perfect; there isn't a better final album Allman could have made." Hal Horowitz from American Songwriter dubbed it "an exceptional work and arguably Allman's finest non-Brothers release." Scott Stroud of the Associated Press wrote that "the album soars with arrangements built to spotlight Allman's singing [...] it reminds us of what a singular talent we just lost." Jim Allen from NPR called it "the kind of farewell every rock 'n' lifer hopes to make."

Andy Gill at The Independent gave the album four stars out of five and praised "Allman's weatherbeaten growl for every ounce of melancholy retrospection and road-weary resignation." Bob Doerschuk, writing for USA Today, similarly singled out his vocal performance, commenting, "Allman's voice delivers in peak form. If this were the debut of a new singer on the rise, critics would laud his control of nuance, his expressiveness and ability to get inside a lyric." Steve Knopper from Newsday felt the record "lacks the sharp hunger of early Allmans classics or the blissed-out soul of his recent work, but Southern Blood has a lean, bluesy persistence." Jon Dolan of Rolling Stone dubbed the album a "moving farewell statement," praising its heavy themes while also complimenting its "laid-back generosity that recalls Allman's kindest Seventies work."

== Track listing ==
No.	Title	Writer(s)	Length
1.	"My Only True Friend"	Gregg Allman; Scott Sharrard	6:16
2.	"Once I Was"	Tim Buckley; Larry Beckett	3:56
3.	"Going Going Gone"	Bob Dylan	4:29
4.	"Black Muddy River"	Jerry Garcia; Robert Hunter	4:37
5.	"I Love the Life I Live"	Willie Dixon	3:31
6.	"Willin'"	Lowell George	3:36
7.	"Blind Bats and Swamp Rats"	Jack Avery	4:32
8.	"Out of Left Field"	Spooner Oldham; Dan Penn	4:09
9.	"Love Like Kerosene"	Sharrard	4:17
10.	"Song for Adam" (featuring Jackson Browne)	Jackson Browne	6:21

Bonus tracks
No.	Title	Writer(s)	Length
11.	"I Love the Life I Live" (Live from the Clay Center, Charleston, West Virginia, May 6, 2016)	Dixon	5:24
12.	"Love Like Kerosene" (Live from the Tower Theatre, Philadelphia, Pennsylvania, April 1, 2016)	Sharrard	7:10

== Personnel ==
Credits are adapted from the album's liner notes.

Locations

- Recorded at Fame Recording Studios, Muscle Shoals, Alabama
- Additional engineering at Blackbird Studios, Nashville, Tennessee and The Hut, Hollywood, California
- Mixed at Mix This!, Los Angeles, California
- Mastered at Capitol Mastering Studios, Hollywood, California

The Gregg Allman Band

- Gregg Allman – vocals, guitar, Hammond B3 organ
- Scott Sharrard – guitar, music director
- Ronald Johnson – bass guitar
- Peter Levin – keyboards, piano, Wurlitzer, Fender Rhodes, vibraphone
- Marc Franklin – trumpet, flugelhorn
- Jay Collins – tenor saxophone, baritone saxophone, flute
- Art Edmaiston – tenor saxophone, baritone saxophone
- Steve Potts – drums
- Marc Quiñones – percussion

Additional musicians

- Greg Leisz – pedal steel guitar (2, 3, 6, 8, 10)
- Buddy Miller – harmony vocals (1–4, 6, 8)
- The McCrary Sisters – backing vocals (3, 4, 6–8)
- Jackson Browne – harmony vocals (10)
- Jay Collins – horn arrangement (1, 3, 6, 9)
- Marc Franklin horn arrangement (2, 4)
- Art Edmaiston – horn arrangement (8)

Production

- Don Srygley – Head Recording Engineer
- Howard Willing – additional engineering
- Tony Fagenson – additional engineering
- Don Was – producer, liner notes
- John Gifford III – Assistant recording engineer
- Jimmy Hole – design
- Ivy Skoff – production coordinator
- Michael Lehman – management, executive producer
- Eliza Levy – executive producer
- John Virant – executive producer
- Devon Allman – liner notes
- Layla Allman – liner notes
- Shannon Allman – liner notes
- Ian Sefchick – mastering
- Bob Clearmountain – mixing
- Sergio Ruelas Jr. – mixing assistant
- Vincent Castiglia – insert painting
- Teresa Earnest – photography
- Matt Butler – photography
- Rachel Jones – production assistant
- Rodney Hall – Assistant
- Spencer Coats – Assistant
- James Van De Bogert – tech support
- Josh Bennett – tech support
- Tim Wright – B-3, Keyboards, Gregg's Guitars
- David "Vid" Sutherland – tour manager, coordinator

== Charts ==
=== Weekly charts ===
Chart (2017)	Peak position
Austrian Albums (Ö3 Austria)	49
Belgian Albums (Ultratop Flanders)	70
Belgian Albums (Ultratop Wallonia)	88
Canadian Albums (Billboard)	84
Dutch Albums (Album Top 100)	80
French Albums (SNEP)	175
German Albums (Offizielle Top 100)	34
Scottish Albums (OCC)	32
Spanish Albums (PROMUSICAE)	71
Swiss Albums (Schweizer Hitparade)	21
UK Albums (OCC)	79
US Billboard 200	11
US Top Rock Albums (Billboard)	3

=== Year-end charts ===
Chart (2017)	Position
US Top Rock Albums (Billboard)	82
