= Lisner Auditorium =

Building in the United States of America

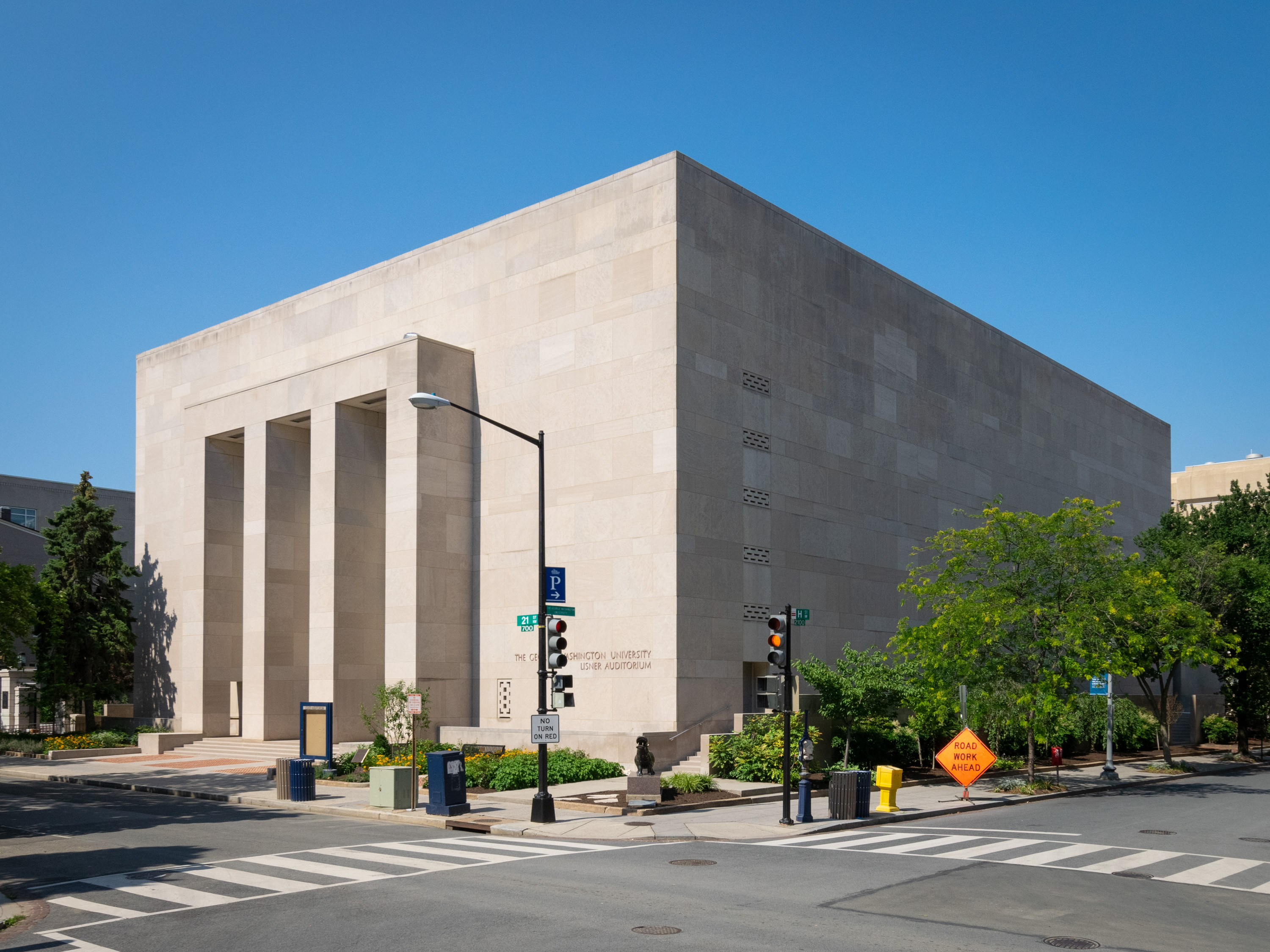
- Lisner Auditorium in June 2020
- Interactive map of Lisner Auditorium
- Address: 730 21st St, NW; Washington, D.C. United States
- Owner: George Washington University
- Capacity: 1,350
- Public transit: Washington Metro at Foggy Bottom

Construction
- Opened: 1946
- Architect: Faulkner & Kingsbury

Website
- www.lisner.org
- Lisner Auditorium
- U.S. National Register of Historic Places
- Location within Central Washington, D.C. Location within the District of Columbia Location within the United States
- Coordinates: 38°53′57.57″N 77°2′49.13″W
- Architectural style: Stripped Classicism
- NRHP reference No.: 90001548
- Designated: October 25, 1990

Lisner Auditorium is a performance venue sited on the Foggy Bottom campus of George Washington University at 730 21st Street Northwest, Washington, D.C. Named for Abram Lisner (1852-1938), a university trustee and benefactor whose will provided one million dollars towards its construction, it was designed in 1940 and completed in 1946. Constructed in the stripped classicist style of the late Art Deco and host to major classical, folk, rock, blues, opera, and theatrical performances over the decades, it was placed on the National Register of Historic Places in 1990 for its dual significance as an architectural work and as a performance venue.

The auditorium played a key role in desegregation at George Washington University and in Washington, D.C.; its 1946 grand opening became a city-wide target for the desegregation of the city's theaters and a catalyst for George Washington students calling on the university to admit African American students. The auditorium seats 1,350 and is the home of the Washington Concert Opera.

== Architecture ==
Lisner Auditorium extends the modernist ethos favored by its architect, Waldron Faulkner (1898-1978), who was born in Paris, France, educated at Yale University, and became influential in Washington, D.C., area architecture, where he designed numerous institutional and residential structures. His work at GW began in the 1930s. Lisner Hall (housing Lisner Library), in whitewashed brick, was completed in 1939 to match the Bauhaus style of flanking Bell Hall (1935) and Stuart Hall (1936). Hall of Government (1939) was the first university building clad in limestone (and in 1951, he designed the adjoining Monroe Hall in similar style). These 1930s modernist additions represented a sharp departure from the university's 1920s Harris Plan, which had called for a full block of Georgian Revival buildings enclosing what is now University Yard. This combination of modernist Bauhaus and Art Deco styles represents the architects' interpretation of university president Cloyd Heck Marvin's distaste for the Colonial Revival style and his insistence on "useful" architecture instead. Marvin and Faulkner's one exception in this era is Hattie M. Strong Hall, designed in a Georgian style they thought appropriately "domestic" for a women's dormitory.

According to the National Register of Historic Places registration form, Lisner Auditorium's stripped classicism "expresses its modern roots in the basic geometric form of a cube." The structure is "sheathed in a tight skin of light colored limestone"; the "alternating limestone courses of square and rectangular blocks and the precise placement of joints present a pleasing pattern to the stonework." The "projecting box-like portico offers the only relief to the severe geometrical form of the building," with its "scale and abstracted columns echo[ing] classical qualities." Doors, grates, and lighting features of "loosely" Art Deco origin provide minimal ornamentation, a theme continued on the interior. Overall, "its modern and formal character are skillfully manipulated to speak [to] the building's function as a prominent center for the performing arts in Washington." Lisner Auditorium's resonance with the 1938 and 1939 First Medal winners of the Beaux Arts Institute's Paris Prize Competitions speaks to its communication with international movements in architecture at the time.

== Funding and construction ==
Construction of Lisner Auditorium was initially funded by Abram Lisner, a German-born owner of Washington's Palais Royal department store. Additional funding for the construction project was provided by the George Washington Memorial Association and the Dimock Estate.

The building was designed by Faulkner & Kingsbury and built by Charles H. Tompkins Company. The groundbreaking ceremony was in 1940; work commenced on the Auditorium in 1941; it opened in 1946.

== Desegregation controversy ==
Lisner Auditorium's opening set the stage for a city-wide effort to desegregate the venue. In early October 1946, a group of white and Black ticket-holders, including the Dean of the Howard University Medical School, tried to attend a ballet performance but were denied entry based on race. Days later, Ingrid Bergman, star of the opening play, Joan of Lorraine, publicly denounced GW's racial exclusion policy and circulated a protest letter signed by the cast. GW students from the American Veterans Committee and the University Veterans Club printed flyers and, with the Southern Conference on Human Welfare, picketed outside. The National Symphony Orchestra canceled performances. In 1947, the Board of Trustees changed the theatre policy to admit African-Americans to sponsored public events, but President Marvin often denied such public uses. As students began to call for the desegregation of the university itself, Marvin publicly defended segregation, and the Trustees did not drop the racial exclusion of African Americans until 1954. In 1971, Lisner Auditorium was the site of a follow-up protest against Marvin's segregationist policies. In March 1970, in the wake of the Kent State shootings, students had dedicated their new student center, opened in 1969, as the Kent State Memorial Student Center. In 1971, the university renamed it the Cloyd Heck Marvin Center, holding the naming ceremony in Lisner Auditorium across the street. Students attended the ceremony en masse, verbally denounced Marvin, and staged a walkout, citing Marvin's racism as a key reason for their actions.

== Performances ==
The first known public performance at Lisner without racial restriction was the 1955 National Symphony Orchestra concert. A diverse schedule soon followed through the late 1950s and early 1960s, with opera singers Licia Albenese and Giuseppe Campora, folk singer Pete Seeger, and blues harmonica player Sonny Terry, rock and roll stars Jackie Wilson, Bo Diddley, Jerry Lee Lewis, and folk singer Joan Baez. On December 14, 1963, Bob Dylan performed there on his first national tour outside of coffeehouses; the show sold out, and three rows of overflow seating was placed on stage behind the singer. The 1970s brought Rush, Pink Floyd, Kiss, Little Feat, Emmylou Harris, Grand Funk Railroad, Joe Cocker, B.B. King, Derek and the Dominoes, Jimmy Buffett, Billy Joel, Blondie, and the Jerry Garcia Band. In the 1980s, Lisner hosted The Replacements, Alex Chilton, Billy Bragg, Midnight Oil, The Church, 10,000 Maniacs, Michelle Shocked, The BoDeans, Thomas Dolby, A Flock of Seagulls, Robyn Hitchcock and Red Hot Chili Peppers.

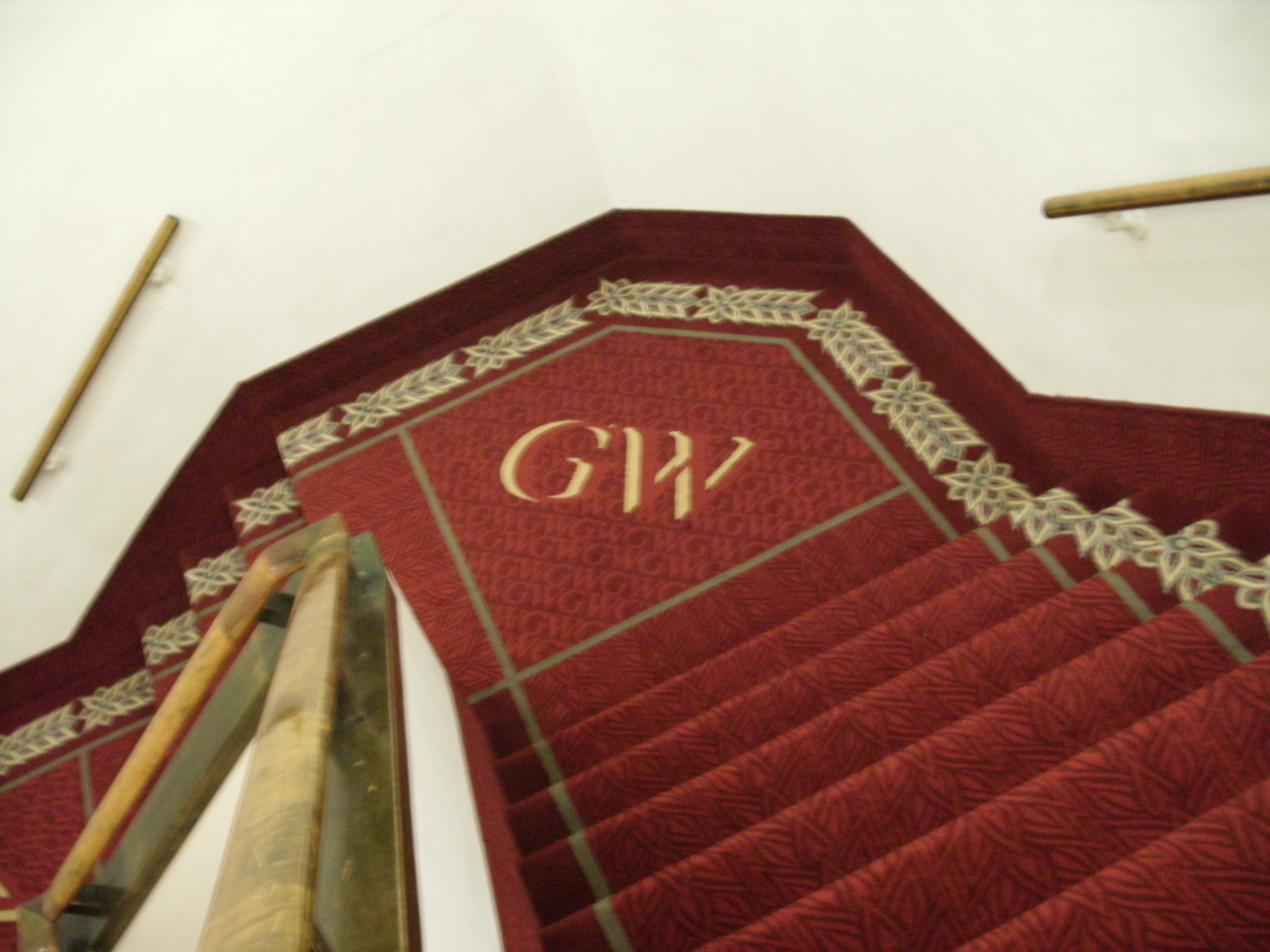
Stairway of Lisner Auditorium

== Live recordings ==
Several live recordings of shows at Lisner have been produced. Nine of the seventeen tracks on Little Feat's 1978 double LP, Waiting for Columbus, were recorded at Lisner on August 8, 9, and 10, 1977, as were five additional tracks included on the "deluxe" 2002 two-CD re-release, along with three more tracks first issued on the 1981 compilation Hoy-Hoy and also included on the 2002 re-release. Stereo Review's 1978 review praised the album's "spontaneity," declaring that "the performances, like the quality of the recording, are crisp, with precisely the kind of moments live albums should catch and usually don't." It was certified Gold in 1979.

== Art ==
Outside of the Auditorium is the River Horse sculpture. In 1996 George Washington University President Stephen Joel Trachtenberg presented this bronze statue of a hippopotamus as a gift to the university's Class of 2000. The auditorium contains a mural by Augustus Vincent Track, and the Dimock gallery is located on the lower Lisner Lounge.
