= Time Loves a Hero =

Studio album by Little Feat
- Released: April 15, 1977
- Recorded: 1976–1977
- Studios: Sunset Sound Studios, Hollywood, CA; Warner Bros. Studios, North Hollywood, CA; Western Recorders, Hollywood, CA; Record Plant, Sausalito, CA
- Length: 35:23
- Label: Warner Bros.
- Producer: Ted Templeman

Little Feat chronology
The Last Record Album (1975)	Time Loves a Hero (1977)	Waiting for Columbus (1978)

Time Loves a Hero is the sixth studio album by the American rock band Little Feat, released in 1977.

The album's cover art is by Neon Park.

== Critical reception ==
Professional ratings
Review scores
Source	Rating
AllMusic	3.5/5 stars
Christgau's Record Guide	B
The Rolling Stone Album Guide	3/5 stars

Record World called the title track "a philosophical, mid-tempo funk tune with some interesting melodic and instrumental hooks."

In his review of the album, music critic Robert Christgau held a somewhat neutral view, writing that "they're not a rock band or even a boogie band anymore—they're a funk band" but that "'Old Folks Boogie' beats anything on the last two albums, 'Time Loves a Hero' tries, and 'Rocket in My Pocket' is a Lowell George readymade like you didn't think he had in him anymore."

== Track listing ==
Side one
No.	Title	Writer(s)	Lead Vocals	Length
1.	"Hi Roller"	Paul Barrère	Lowell George	3:35
2.	"Time Loves a Hero"	P. Barrère, Kenny Gradney, Bill Payne	P. Barrère, Payne	3:47
3.	"Rocket in My Pocket"	George	George	3:25
4.	"Day at the Dog Races"	P. Barrère, Sam Clayton, Gradney, Richie Hayward, Payne	(instrumental)	6:27

Side two
No.	Title	Writer(s)	Lead Vocals	Length
1.	"Old Folks Boogie"	Gabriel Barrère, P. Barrère	P. Barrère	3:31
2.	"Red Streamliner"	Payne, Fran Tate	Payne	4:44
3.	"New Delhi Freight Train"	Terry Allen	George	3:42
4.	"Keepin' Up with the Joneses"	P. Barrère, George	P. Barrère	3:51
5.	"Missin' You"	P. Barrère	P. Barrère	2:21

== Personnel ==
Little Feat

- Lowell George – guitar, lead (1, 3, 7) & backing vocals
- Paul Barrère – guitar, lead (2, 5, 8, 9) & backing vocals
- Bill Payne – keyboards, synthesizer, marimba, lead (2, 6) & backing vocals
- Sam Clayton – congas, percussion, backing vocals
- Kenny Gradney – bass
- Richie Hayward – drums, percussion, backing vocals

Additional musicians

- Greg Adams – trumpet, horn arrangements
- Jeff "Skunk" Baxter – dobro ("Missin' You")¹
- Emilio Castillo – tenor saxophone
- Nick DeCaro – string arrangements
- Mic Gillette – trombone, trumpet
- Stephen "Doc" Kupka – baritone saxophone
- Michael McDonald – vocals ("Red Streamliner")
- Lenny Pickett – alto saxophone ("Keepin' Up With The Joneses")
- Patrick Simmons – acoustic guitar ("New Delhi Freight Train"), vocals ("Red Streamliner")
- Fred Tackett – mandocello and guitar ("Time Loves a Hero")

== Charts ==
Chart (1977)	Peak position
Australian Albums (Kent Music Report)	48
Canada Top Albums/CDs (RPM)	62
New Zealand Albums (RMNZ)	14
Swedish Albums (Sverigetopplistan)	31
UK Albums (Official Charts)	8
US Billboard 200	34

== Certifications ==
Region	Certification	Certified units/sales
United Kingdom (BPI)	Silver	60,000^{^}
United States (RIAA)	Gold	500,000^{^}
^{^} Shipments figures based on certification alone.

== Note ==
¹ Little Feat – Raw Tomatoes Vol.1 (2002) booklet p14: "the skunk was not on that track"
