= Little Feat (album) =

1971 studio album by Little Feat

Studio album by Little Feat
- Released: January 1971
- Recorded: August–September 1970
- Studio: United Western Recorders and the Record Plant, Los Angeles
- Genre: Rock and roll; country rock; roots rock
- Length: 32:49
- Label: Warner Bros.
- Producer: Russ Titelman

Little Feat chronology
Little Feat (1971)	Sailin' Shoes (1972)

Professional ratings
Review scores
Source	Rating
AllMusic	5/5 stars
Christgau's Record Guide	B
Rolling Stone	(very favorable)

Little Feat is the debut studio album by American rock band Little Feat, released in 1971 by Warner Bros. Records.

The album was recorded mostly in sessions between August and September 1970. Its sound is in a similar vein as the band's more widely known later recordings, such as 1973's Dixie Chicken. The record features Little Feat's initial line-up, with Roy Estrada on bass. It was the first of eight albums by the band before its first break up in 1979. The cover shows the mural Venice in the Snow, painted by the L. A. Fine Arts Squad in 1970, in Venice, Los Angeles.

The album was a commercial flop, selling very poorly. However, critical reception was very positive. In 2007, the album was released as a gold CD through the Mobile Fidelity Sound Lab.

== Track listing ==
Side one
No.	Title	Writer(s)	Length
1.	"Snakes on Everything"	Bill Payne	3:04
2.	"Strawberry Flats"	Payne, Lowell George	2:20
3.	"Truck Stop Girl"	Payne, George	2:32
4.	"Brides of Jesus"	Payne, George	3:20
5.	"Willin'"	George	2:24
6.	"Hamburger Midnight"	George, Roy Estrada	2:30

Side two
No.	Title	Writer(s)	Length
1.	"Forty-Four Blues / How Many More Years"	Roosevelt Sykes, Chester Burnett	6:25
2.	"Crack in Your Door"	George	2:16
3.	"I've Been the One"	George	2:20
4.	"Takin' My Time"	Payne	3:45
5.	"Crazy Captain Gunboat Willie"	Payne, George	1:55

== Personnel ==
Little Feat

- Lowell George – lead vocals, guitars, harmonica
- Bill Payne – keyboards, piano, backing vocals, lead vocal (1, 10)
- Roy Estrada – bass, backing vocals
- Richard Hayward – drums, backing vocals, co-lead vocals (11)

Additional

- Russ Titelman – percussion, backing vocals, piano (9)
- Ry Cooder – bottleneck guitar (5, 7)
- Sneaky Pete Kleinow – pedal steel guitar (9)
- Kirby Johnson – string and horn arrangements
