= Willin' (song) =

Song by Little Feat

from the album Little Feat
- Released: 1971
- Genre: Country rock, country blues, folk rock, roots rock
- Length: 2:24
- Label: Warner Bros.
- Songwriter: Lowell George
- Producer: Russ Titelman

Official audio"Willin'" (1972 version) on YouTube

"Willin'" is a song written by American musician Lowell George, and first recorded and released by Johnny Darrell on his 1970 album California Stop-Over. It was subsequently released by George's group Little Feat on their January 1971 debut album Little Feat. The song has since been performed by a variety of artists.

== Background ==
George wrote the song while he was a member of the Mothers of Invention. When George sang an early version of the song for bandleader Frank Zappa, Zappa suggested that the guitarist form his own band rather than continue under Zappa's tutelage. He did just that, and the song was subsequently recorded by Lowell's band Little Feat. The song was included on Little Feat's 1971 self-titled debut album. The band re-recorded the song at a slower tempo to much greater success on their 1972 Sailin' Shoes album. A live version recorded in 1977 appears on their 1978 album Waiting for Columbus.

The lyrics are from the point of view of a truck driver who has driven "from Tucson to Tucumcari, Tehachapi to Tonopah" and "smuggled some smokes and folks from Mexico"; the song has become a trucker anthem. The lyrics, particularly the line "...if you give me weed, whites, and wine", prevented it from being broadcast on radio.

== Personnel ==
- Lowell George – lead, rhythm and slide guitars, lead and backing vocals
- Bill Payne – keyboards, backing vocals, piano
- Roy Estrada – bass, backing vocals
- Richard Hayward – drums, backing vocals

Additional

- Russ Titelman – percussion, backing vocals
- Ry Cooder – bottleneck guitar

== Covers ==
Seatrain covered the song on their 1970 album Seatrain, released after Johnny Darrell's version, but one month before Lowell George's own Little Feat version.

Linda Ronstadt covered the song on her 1974 Heart Like a Wheel album. This version was featured prominently early in James Cameron's 1989 movie The Abyss, with multiple characters singing along as a submarine tows an underwater oil rig. Later in the film, another character destroys a radio that is playing the song.

Commander Cody and His Lost Planet Airmen covered the song on their 1975 album Commander Cody and His Lost Planet Airmen.

Steve Earle covered the song on his compilation album Sidetracks, released in 2002.

Gregg Allman released the song on his final studio album Southern Blood which was released posthumously in September 2017.

A version by Willie Nelson and Emmylou Harris was released in April 2026.
