= Paul Barrere =

American musician (1948–2019)

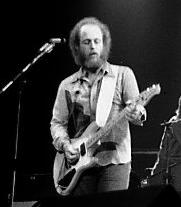
- Barrere performing with Little Feat in 1977

Background information
- Born: July 3, 1948; Burbank, California, U.S.
- Died: October 26, 2019 (aged 71) Los Angeles, California, U.S.
- Genres: Rock, roots rock, blues rock, swamp rock, jam band
- Occupations: Musician, songwriter
- Instruments: Guitar, vocals
- Years active: 1972–2019
- Labels: Rhino; Warner Bros.; CMC International; Hot Tomato
- Formerly of: Little Feat; Paul Barrere & Fred Tackett Duo
- Website: www.littlefeat.net

Paul Barrere (July 3, 1948 – October 26, 2019) was an American musician most prominent as a member of the band Little Feat, which he joined in 1972 some three years after the band was created by Lowell George.

== Career ==
Barrere recorded and performed with Taj Mahal, Jack Bruce, Chicken Legs, Blues Busters, Valerie Carter, Helen Watson, Chico Hamilton, Robert Palmer, Eikichi Yazawa, and Carly Simon. He can be seen in the 1979 Nicolette Larson promotional video of "Lotta Love".

Barrere's best known contributions to Little Feat as a songwriter include "Skin It Back" and "Feats Don't Fail Me Now" from the album Feats Don't Fail Me Now, "All That You Dream" from The Last Record Album, "Time Loves a Hero" from Time Loves a Hero, and "Down on the Farm" from Down on the Farm.

Barrere could play a wide variety of styles of music including blues, rock, jazz, and cajun music and was proficient as a slide guitarist.

Barrere also recorded and toured as an acoustic duo with fellow Little Feat member Fred Tackett.

Barrere played several concerts with Phil Lesh and Friends in October 1999 and from March to June 2000. He also toured with Bob Dylan, and had most recently been writing and recording with Roger Cole.

== Personal life ==
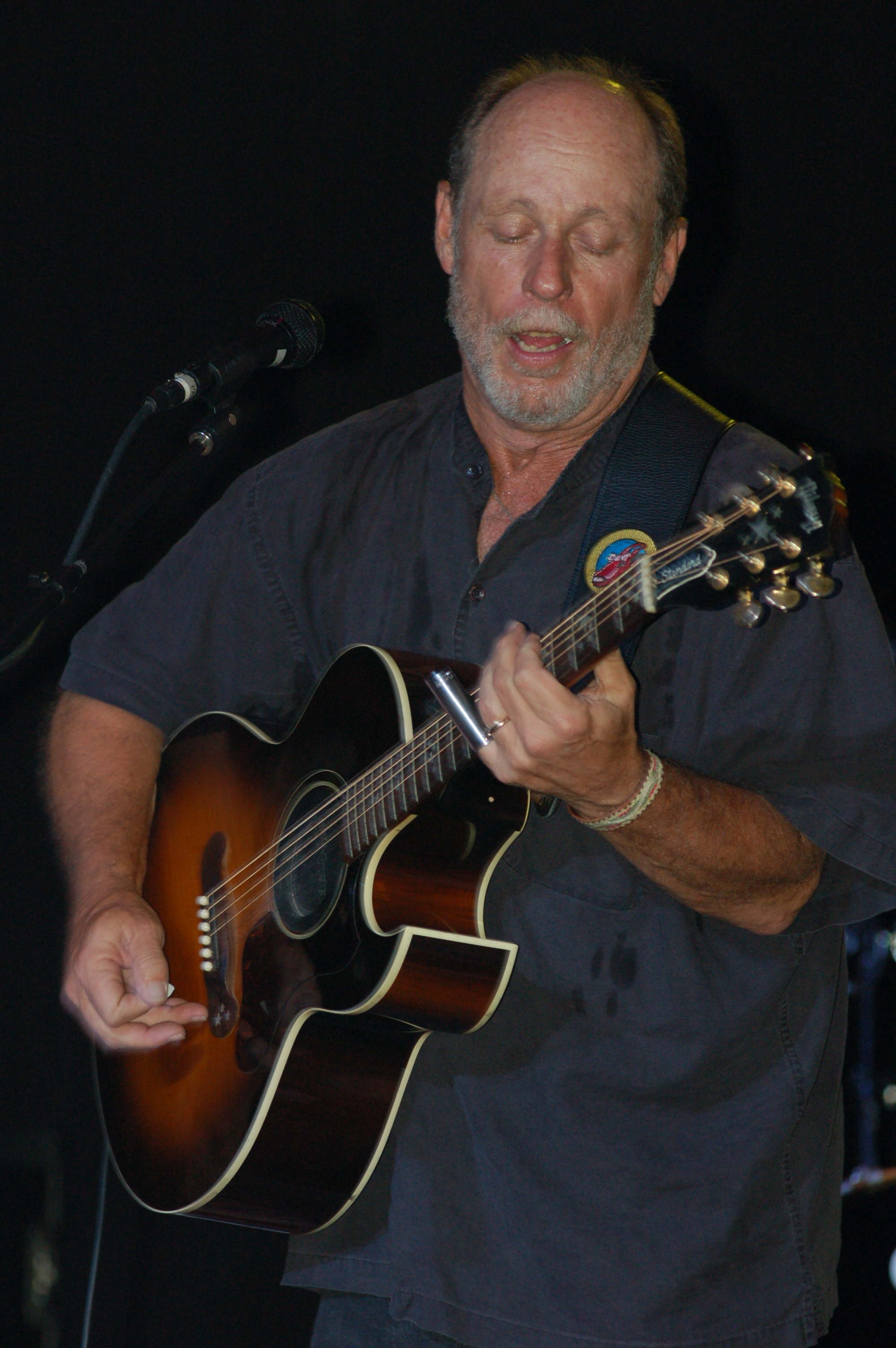
Barrere performing with Little Feat in 2009

Born on July 3, 1948, in Burbank, California, he was the son of the Hollywood actors Paul Bryar and Claudia Bryar. Barrere contracted Hepatitis C in 1994, but had managed to keep it under control. In 2015, he was diagnosed with liver cancer.

Paul Barrere died on October 26, 2019, at the age of 71 in Westwood, Los Angeles, California.

== Discography ==
=== Solo ===
- 1983 On My Own Two Feet (Mirage)
- 1984 Real Lies (Atlantic)
- 1995 If the Phone Don't Ring (Zoo)

=== Bluesbusters ===
- 1984 Merry Christmas (Tower)
- 1986 Accept No Substitute (Landslide)
- 1987 This Time (Landslide)

=== Paul Barrere and Fred Tackett ===
- 2001 Live from North Cafe (Relix)
- 2009 Live in the UK 2008 (Stonehenge)

=== Collaborations ===
- 2013 Plays Well with Others - by Greg Koch - Tracks: 4,7,9,10

With Bonnie Raitt

- Takin' My Time (Columbia Records, 2013)

With Pat McGee

- Pat McGee (Pat McGee, 2015)

With Valerie Carter

- Just a Stone's Throw Away (Columbia Records, 1977)

With Robert Palmer

- Pressure Drop (Island Records, 1975)
- Some People Can Do What They Like (Island Records, 1976)
- Double Fun (Island Records, 1978)

With Sanne Salomonsen

- Language of the Heart (Virgin Records, 1994)

With Nicolette Larson

- Nicolette (Warner Bros. Records, 1978)
- In the Nick of Time (Warner Bros. Records, 1979)
- Radioland (Warner Bros. Records, 1981)

With The Oak Ridge Boys

- American Dreams (MCA Records, 1988)

With Tom Johnston

- Everything You've Heard Is True (Warner Bros. Records, 1979)

With Taj Mahal

- Like Never Before (Private Music, 1991)

With Carly Simon

- Another Passenger (Elektra Records, 1976)
