= Neon Park =

American artist (1940–1993)

- Born: Martin Muller; December 28, 1940
- Died: September 1, 1993 (aged 52)

Neon Park (born Martin Muller, December 28, 1940 – September 1, 1993) was an American artist, comics artist and illustrator, best known for the images that have strongly defined covers for nearly every Little Feat album except for the band's self-titled first album. He also created the cover of Weasels Ripped My Flesh for Frank Zappa, as well as covers and graphics for David Bowie, Dr. John, and the Beach Boys. Illustrations for Playboy, National Lampoon, Glass Eye, and DreamWorks are also among his claims to fame. Park's work was noted for its surreal images and frequent use of anthropomorphic duck characters, inspired by Carl Barks.

Park met his second wife, filmmaker and painter Chick Strand, during the early sixties Berkeley scene. They were collaborators in art and life for over 30 years, dividing their time between Los Angeles and San Miguel de Allende, a small town in Mexico, an influence seen in his later works.

In 1983, Park began to notice numbness in his hands. His physical condition worsened over several years. After many tests and operations, he was diagnosed in 1992 with amyotrophic lateral sclerosis (ALS), also known as Lou Gehrig's disease. His response to the doctor who told him he had the disease was, "I never even played baseball." ALS is a degenerative disease with no treatment available, and doctors estimated a two-year survival time. He continued to work, but as his illness advanced he could no longer paint, so he concentrated on writing poetry, typing with one finger when he could no longer hold a pen.

He died in 1993.
