= Nobody (The Doobie Brothers song) =

Single by the Doobie Brothers

from the album The Doobie Brothers
- B-side: "Slippery St. Paul"; "Flying Cloud" (reissue)
- Released: May 26, 1971; October 2, 1974 (reissue)
- Recorded: Late 1970
- Genre: Rock
- Length: 3:42
- Label: Warner Bros.
- Songwriter: Tom Johnston
- Producers: Lenny Waronker; Ted Templeman

The Doobie Brothers singles chronology
"Nobody" (1971)	"Feelin' Down Farther" (1971)

Music video
- "Nobody" (2010 version) on YouTube

"Nobody" is a song by the American rock band the Doobie Brothers, released on May 26, 1971 by Warner Bros. Records. The single was reissued in 1974, a re-recorded version was included on World Gone Crazy, and was re-recorded again as a duet for Southbound in 2014 with Charlie Worsham.

== Background ==
Tom Johnston was inspired to write "Nobody" while driving down U.S. Route 1, which runs down the west coast. Its lyrical contents consist of the singer sailing down the Mendocino coastline to Jenner.

== Release and reception ==
Writing a review for the single's 1974 reissue in Cashbox magazine, the publication called it a "bouncy musical jaunt", adding that that "the vocals are gutsy and tight and the instrumentation is solid". Record World said that the reissue's "total new production" had "captur[ed] some of the group's most dynamic moments yet on disc."

== Track listing ==
According to the Netherlands' chart website:

7" Single (Warner Bros. 7495)
No.	Title	Writer(s)	Length
1.	"Nobody"	Tom Johnston	3:42
2.	"Slippery St. Paul"	Patrick Simmons	2:14

7" Single (Warner Bros. K 16083)
No.	Title	Writer(s)	Length
1.	"Nobody"	Johnston	2:42
2.	"It Won't Be Right"	Johnston, Simmons	2:38

1974 7" Single (Warner Bros. WBS 8041)
No.	Title	Writer(s)	Length
1.	"Nobody"	Johnston	3:42
2.	"Flying Cloud" (originally released on What Were Once Vices Are Now Habits)	Tiran Porter	2:00

== Charts ==
Original release
Chart (1971)	Peak position
US Bubbling Under Hot 100 Singles (Billboard)	22

1974 reissue
Chart (1974)	Peak position
US Billboard Hot 100	58

2010 re-recording
Chart (2010)	Peak position
US Adult Alternative Airplay (Billboard)	19
