= Dave Shogren =

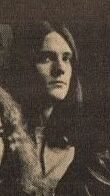
- Shogren in 1970

Background information
- Born: October 12, 1950; San Francisco, California, US
- Died: December 14, 1999 (aged 49) San Jose, California, US
- Genres: Rock
- Occupations: Musician, producer
- Instruments: Bass guitar, vocals
- Years active: 1970–1999
- Formerly of: The Doobie Brothers

Dave Shogren (October 12, 1950 — December 14, 1999) was an American musician. He was the original bassist for The Doobie Brothers. Shogren was born in San Francisco.

== The Doobie Brothers ==
Shogren formed The Doobie Brothers with Tom Johnston, Patrick Simmons and John Hartman in 1970. Shogren was the bass player for the band from 1970 to November 1971, he was present on their first two albums: The Doobie Brothers (1971) and Toulouse Street (1972), however Dave only plays on two songs on Toulouse Street, "Toulouse Street" and "White Sun" as he left due to disagreements with their new manager, Ted Templeman, and was replaced by Tiran Porter.

After leaving the Doobie Brothers, Dave played in a few bands in the Bay area including S. F. Star and Raven. He bought Subsonic recording studio and was a chief engineer for Parrot Audio Books, working on twelve books including autobiographies of Burt Reynolds and John Denver.

On August 23, 1999, the Doobie Brothers obtained an injunction preventing a tribute band featuring Shogren, Chet McCracken and Cornelius Bumpus and managed by former DB manager Paul Curcio from performing under any name relating to the "Doobie Brothers" name. The three had originally gone out as "The Original Doobie Brothers" before the bands lawyers stopped them. In court, Curcio argued that although Shogren was in fact an original member of the band, they had no plans advertising themselves as full-on originals. In August 1999, an agreement was born in Orlando, Florida that allowed the three to carry on with the band but under the name "SMB - Former Doobie Brothers Performing the hits of the Doobie Brothers".

== Death ==
Shogren died in San Jose, California on December 14, 1999. His death was believed to be from pneumonia. One obituary claims he died in his sleep at his house another says he died in his recording studio. Dave never married or had any children but was survived by both his parents and two siblings.

== Discography ==
- The Doobie Brothers (1971)
- Toulouse Street (1972, two tracks only)
