= Liberté (The Doobie Brothers album) =

Studio album by the Doobie Brothers
- Released: October 1, 2021
- Genre: Pop rock
- Length: 42:44
- Label: Island
- Producer: John Shanks

The Doobie Brothers chronology
Southbound (2014)	Liberté (2021)	Walk This Road (2025)

Singles from Liberté
- 1. "Easy" Released: May 2, 2022

Liberté is the fifteenth studio album by American rock band the Doobie Brothers, released on Island Records. First released exclusively on streaming services on October 1, 2021, the album saw a CD release on October 29 and an LP release in June 2022. It is their first studio album since 2014's Southbound, and their first of new material since 2010's World Gone Crazy. The band toured following the release of the album.

== Background ==
Vocalist and keyboardist Michael McDonald does not appear on the album, despite being a member of the band during its recording and release (McDonald, however, does appear on its successor, 2025's Walk This Road). Instead, the album features the lineup of vocalist and guitarist Tom Johnston, vocalist and guitarist Patrick Simmons, and guitarist John McFee. All tracks on the album were co-written by John Shanks, who also produced the album. The album was promoted with the August release of a self-titled, four track EP featuring the tracks "Oh Mexico", "Cannonball", "Don't Ya Mess with Me", and "Better Days", and with a lyric video for the track "Shine Your Light", posted to the band's official YouTube channel on the day of the album's release.

== Reception ==
Professional ratings
Review scores
Source	Rating
AllMusic	3/5 stars
American Songwriter	3.5/5 stars

Upon its release, Liberté failed to chart on the Billboard 200, one of only three of their albums to have that distinction, along with their 1971 self-titled debut, and 2000's Sibling Rivalry. However, it did manage to chart at number 47 on the Billboard Top Album Sales chart. "Easy", the first and only single released from the album, reached number 16 on the Billboard Adult Contemporary chart.

The album received moderately positive reviews from music critics. AllMusic's Stephen Thomas Erlewine awarded it three stars, noting that while the band "take[s] pains to make the album sound contemporary" with a "glossy" production style and electronic elements, "the record works because the Doobies remain dedicated to the rocking boogie they've been playing for 50 years."

== Track listing ==
Liberté track listing
No.	Title	Writer(s)	Length
1.	"Oh Mexico"	Tom Johnston, John Shanks	3:21
2.	"Better Days"	Patrick Simmons, Shanks	3:22
3.	"Don't Ya Mess with Me"	Johnston, Shanks	3:32
4.	"Cannonball"	Simmons, Shanks	3:44
5.	"Wherever We Go"	Simmons, Shanks	4:01
6.	"The American Dream"	Johnston, Shanks	3:50
7.	"Shine Your Light"	Johnston, Shanks	3:51
8.	"We Are More Than Love"	Simmons, Shanks	3:24
9.	"Easy"	Johnston, Shanks	2:58
10.	"Just Can’t Do This Alone"	Johnston, Shanks	3:18
11.	"Good Thang"	Simmons, Shanks	3:10
12.	"Amen Old Friend"	Johnston, Shanks	4:13
Total length:			42:44

== Personnel ==
- Tom Johnston – lead vocals (tracks 1, 3, 6, 7, 9, 10, 12), acoustic guitar (track 1), electric guitar (tracks 1, 3, 10), guitar^{[a]} (tracks 6, 7, 9), backing vocals (tracks 1, 3, 4, 7–12)
- Patrick Simmons – lead vocals (tracks 2, 4, 5, 8, 11), acoustic guitar (track 8), guitar^{[a]} (track 4, 11), guitjo and banjo (track 11), backing vocals (tracks 2, 4, 5, 8)
- John McFee – electric guitar (track 4), guitar^{[a]} (track 11), mandolin and banjo (track 6), pedal steel guitar (track 9), backing vocals (tracks 4, 6, 7, 9, 11)

Additional musicians

- John Shanks – electric and acoustic guitar (all tracks), bass guitar (tracks 1, 3, 5, 7, 8), dobro (track 4), keyboards (tracks 2, 4–10, 12), synthesizer (track 3), piano (tracks 3, 4), organ (track 9), programming (tracks 1–4, 6, 7, 9, 11), drum programming (track 10), percussion (track 7), backing vocals (tracks 2, 4–10, 12), production (all tracks)
- Billy Payne – piano (tracks 2, 4–7, 9, 11, 12), Hammond B-3 organ (tracks 2, 4–7, 9, 10–12), Wurlitzer organ (tracks 4, 9), keyboards (tracks 5, 10, 12), synthesizer (track 2)
- John Cowan – backing vocals (tracks 1–7, 9–12)
- Victor Indrizzo – drums (all tracks), percussion (tracks 1–5, 7, 8, 10–12)
- Bob Glaub – bass guitar (tracks 4, 6, 9–12)
- Jeff Babko – piano and synthesizer (track 3), Hammond B3 and Wurlitzer organ (tracks 1 and 3), clavinet (track 1)
- Bradley Giroux – drum programming (track 8)
- Lucy Woodward – backing vocals (track 12)
- Dan Keen – string arrangements (track 12)

Production

- Jeri Heiden, Ryan Corey – art direction, design
- Shari Sutcliffe – music contractor, project coordinator
- Bradley Giroux, Keith Gretlein – engineer (tracks 2, 4, 6, 7, 9, 11)
- Jeremiah Rios – assistant engineer at Studio At The Palms (tracks 2)
- Joe LaPorta – mastering
- Chris Lord-Alge – mixing (tracks 1–5, 8, 10, 12)
- Michael H. Brauer – mixing (tracks 6, 7, 9, 11)
- Brian Judd – assistant mixing (tracks 1–5, 8, 10, 12)
- Fernando Reyes – assistant mixing (tracks 6, 7, 9, 11)
- Clay Patrick McBride – photography
- Dan Chase – additional recording and editing (tracks 4, 6, 7, 9, 11)
- Tom Syrowski – additional recording and editing (tracks 2, 5, 10, 12)
- Steve Marcantonio – John Cowan vocals recording (tracks 1, 3)

Note

- ^{^[a]} The credits for Liberté, in some cases, list credits for "guitar" contributions. This is in addition to already listed acoustic and electric guitar credits, and it is unclear what these credits are specifically meant to refer to.

== Charts ==
Chart performance for Liberté
Chart (2021)	Peak position
Swiss Albums (Schweizer Hitparade)	42
US Top Album Sales (Billboard)	47
