= Walk This Road (album) =

Studio album by The Doobie Brothers
- Released: June 6, 2025
- Genre: Folk rock
- Length: 38:48
- Label: Rhino
- Producer: John Shanks

The Doobie Brothers chronology
Liberté (2021)	Walk This Road (2025)

Singles from Walk This Road
- 1. "Lahaina" Released: November 17, 2023; 2. "Walk This Road" Released: January 22, 2025; 3. "Call Me" Released: January 22, 2025; 4. "Angels & Mercy" Released: May 15, 2025

Walk This Road is the sixteenth studio album by the American rock band the Doobie Brothers. It was released on June 6, 2025, on Rhino Records.

== Composition and lyrics ==
The album's title track, which is also the first track on the album, sees the band reflecting on their long career, as the band has been together since 1970, albeit with a five-year hiatus between 1982 and 1987. The track also features vocals from American gospel singer Mavis Staples. The album's second track, "Angels & Mercy" is about a man who, according to Patrick Simmons, is "at the end of his rope [...] He's been running for a long time from one thing or another, and [he's] looking for redemption". "Call Me", the third track on the album, tells the story of a man who is having a long-distance relationship, “It’s about a guy having a phone relationship, but it’s a positive thing" as Tom Johnston explained.

"Learn to Let Go", is the fourth track on the album, and complicates learning to accept something is over, "'Learn to Let Go' is a song about, more or less, one of the hardest lessons we learn in this life, especially where love is concerned, and probably the last decision we make on this earthly plane. The song is not all that serious, but we hope you enjoy it" Michael McDonald explained in a video explaining the track's meaning. "State of Grace", the fifth track on the album talks about reconciliation, "There are a lot of references to recovery and enlightenment," stated Simmons on the track, "Not enlightenment in terms of being enlightened, but in terms of waking and seeing the important things that you’ve been missing". "Here to Stay" is the sixth track on the album. It was written around 10 years before its release.

Inspired by the Meters and Professor Longhair in the early 1970s, "The Kind That Lasts", the seventh track, "explores the idea" of the phrase "putting your eggs in one basket", as McDonald explained, "Don’t find your meaning of life in someone else before you make sure that you believe in yourself, learn to love yourself first, and then you’ll find that maybe love is something different than you know". "New Orleans", the eighth track, is an ode to the city of the same name, which was a "special place" to the band, "We’ve been to New Orleans 100 times. I know Tommy loves New Orleans, but we all do. We have friends there. We love the music. We love the food. It’s a culture all its own that we can’t get enough of it when we’re there, so that song has a little bit of a larger meaning to everyone in the band'", it features backing vocals from Sharlotte Gibson. "Speed of Pain", talks about regrets and lessons learned. The final track on the album, "Lahaina" is an ode to Lahaina, a town in Hawaii that was affected by the 2023 Hawaii wildfires.

== Promotion ==
The album was announced on December 30, 2024, on the band's social media profiles. The album was previewed by three tracks, the first being "Lahaina" in 2023. The title track and "Call Me" were previewed in 2025. The album was followed by a tour that started from August 4, 2025, and ended on September 19, 2025. The band was supposed to be one of the support acts for Electric Light Orchestra during ELO's BST Hyde Park 2025 performance. The performance was cancelled due to Jeff Lynne's health issues.

== Reception ==
Professional ratings
Aggregate scores
Source	Rating
Metacritic	69/100
Review scores
Source	Rating
AllMusic	3/5 stars
Classic Rock	3.5/5 stars
Mojo	3/5 stars
Uncut	8/10

Rolling Stone critic Sage Anderson states that the title track "embodies a sense of hope and togetherness, in terms of searching for the right path forward."

Classic Rock magazine critic John Aizlewood stated that it "is an album as full of joy as it is of craft. Sixteen albums in, they're still not letting themselves down."

AllMusic critic Mark Deming called it an "album that honors the band's rocking spirit while making room for McDonald's soul-satisfying vocal style."

The single "Learn to Let Go" spent 7 weeks on the Billboard Adult Contemporary Charts, peaking at #23.

== Track listing ==
Walk This Road track listing
No.	Title	Writer(s)	Length
1.	"Walk This Road" (featuring Mavis Staples)	Michael McDonald; John Shanks	3:37
2.	"Angels & Mercy"	Patrick Simmons; Shanks	3:49
3.	"Call Me"	Tom Johnston; Shanks	3:38
4.	"Learn to Let Go"	McDonald; Shanks	4:19
5.	"State of Grace"	Simmons; Shanks	4:00
6.	"Here to Stay"	Johnston; Shanks	3:56
7.	"The Kind that Lasts"	McDonald; Shanks	3:47
8.	"New Orleans"	Johnston; Shanks	3:50
9.	"Speed of Pain"	McDonald; Shanks	3:34
10.	"Lahaina" (featuring Mick Fleetwood, Jake Shimabukuro, and Henry Kapono)	McDonald; Simmons; Shanks	4:17

== Personnel ==
Credits adapted from Tidal.

=== The Doobie Brothers ===
- Tom Johnston – background vocals (tracks 1, 3, 4, 6, 8), lead vocals (1, 3, 6, 8, 10), electric guitar (3, 6, 8), acoustic guitar (3, 6), guitars (10)
- Michael McDonald – background vocals (tracks 1, 2, 4–6, 8–10); lead vocals, keyboards (1, 4, 7, 9, 10); Hammond B3 organ (2, 4, 7, 9), piano (2, 4, 9), electric piano (7), accordion (8), acoustic guitar (9)
- John McFee – additional engineering (tracks 1–9), slide guitar (1), mandolin (2, 4–6); harmonica, resonator guitar, violin (2, 4, 6); cello, pedal steel guitar (5); guitars (10)
- Patrick Simmons – background vocals (tracks 1, 2, 5, 6, 8, 9), lead vocals (1, 2, 5, 10); Dobro, electric guitar (2, 4); acoustic guitar (2, 5); keyboards, mandolin (5); guitars (10)

=== Additional musicians ===
- John Shanks – electric guitar (tracks 1–9), acoustic guitar (2–6, 8, 9), background vocals (2, 4, 5), mandolin (2, 5), bass (2, 10), drum programming (3, 9), keyboards (5, 6, 8), banjo (5); Hammond B3 organ, piano (6); percussion (10)
- Victor Indrizzo – drums (tracks 1–9), percussion (1, 3–9)
- Jeff Babko – keyboards (tracks 1, 3); horn arrangements, trombone (1); piano (3, 8), Hammond B3 organ (8)
- Pino Palladino – bass (tracks 1, 5, 7, 9)
- Woody Mankowski – baritone saxophone, tenor saxophone (track 1)
- Dean Parks – electric guitar (track 1)
- Jamie Hovorka – trumpet (track 1)
- Mavis Staples – vocals (track 1)
- John Cowan – background vocals (tracks 2, 4, 6)
- Johnnie Bamont – baritone saxophone (track 3)
- Bob Glaub – bass (tracks 3, 8)
- Marc Russo – horn arrangements, tenor saxophone (track 3)
- Joel Jaffe – horn arrangements (track 3)
- Mike Rinta – trombone (track 3)
- Marvin McFadden – trumpet (track 3)
- Jamie Muhoberac – keyboards (tracks 4, 5)
- Sean Hurley – bass (track 4)
- Sharlotte Gibson – background vocals (track 8)
- Bradley Giroux – drum programming (track 9)
- Mick Fleetwood – drums (track 10)
- Jake Shimabukuro – ukulele (track 10)
- Henry Kapono – vocals (track 10)

=== Technical ===
- John Shanks – production
- Ted Jensen – mastering (tracks 1–9)
- Chris Lord-Alge – mixing (tracks 1–9)
- Bradley Giroux – engineering
- Kaleb Allen – engineering (tracks 1–8)
- Kyle Spicer – engineering (tracks 1–8)
- Lynn Peterson – additional engineering (tracks 1–9)
- Mat Lejeune – additional engineering (tracks 1–9)
- Michael Grande – additional engineering (tracks 1–9)
- Brian Judd – mixing assistance (tracks 1–9)

== Charts ==
Chart performance for Walk This Road
Chart (2025)	Peak position
Croatian International Albums (HDU)	6
French Rock & Metal Albums (SNEP)	14
Hungarian Physical Albums (MAHASZ)	14
Japanese Albums (Oricon)	26
Scottish Albums (Official Charts)	9
Swiss Albums (Schweizer Hitparade)	29
UK Albums (Official Charts)	92
US Billboard 200	76
US Top Rock Albums (Billboard)	16
US Top Rock & Alternative Albums (Billboard)	18
US Indie Store Album Sales (Billboard)	13
US Vinyl Albums (Billboard)	13
