= Live at Wolf Trap =

Live album by The Doobie Brothers

Live album by The Doobie Brothers
- Released: October 26, 2004
- Recorded: July 25, 2004
- Venue: Wolf Trap National Park, Virginia
- Genre: Rock
- Length: 79:33
- Label: Sanctuary
- Producer: Michael Drumm, Andrea Allen

The Doobie Brothers chronology
| Divided Highway (2003) | Live at Wolf Trap (2004) | The Very Best Of (2007) |

Live at Wolf Trap

Video by The Doobie Brothers
- Released: October 26, 2004
- Recorded: July 25, 2004 at Wolf Trap National Park, Virginia
- Genre: Rock
- Length: 120 min. (concert only)
- Label: Sanctuary
- Director: Michael Drumm
- Producer: Michael Drumm and Andrea Allen

Professional ratings
Review scores
| Source | Rating |
|---|---|
| Allmusic | (CD) |
| Allmusic | (DVD) |
| Classic Rock | (DVD) |

Live at Wolf Trap is the third live album by US rock band The Doobie Brothers, released in 2004.

Wolf Trap is a National Park in Virginia, where the band performed live on July 25.

In addition to the CD, a DVD was released featuring, in addition to the CD setlist, "People Gotta Love Again", "Spirit", "Nobody", "Neal's Fandango", "Takin' It to the Streets" and "Without You", interviews, a photo gallery and other bonus features.

The album was also released as a double LP vinyl set, same tracklist as the CD version.

The album revived a handful of tracks the Doobies had not released live versions of before from Tom Johnston's original stint with the band. The set also included a cover of the rock and roll standard "Little Bitty Pretty One".

The album contains the final recordings of drummer and vocalist Keith Knudsen, who died shortly after its release.

== CD track listing ==
1. "Rockin' Down the Highway" (Johnston) - 3:30
2. "Jesus Is Just Alright" (Arthur Reid Reynolds) - 5:05
3. "Dangerous" (Simmons) - 5:10
4. "Another Park, Another Sunday" (Johnston) - 4:40
5. "Steamer Lane" (instrumental) (Simmons) - 3:51
6. "South City Midnight Lady" (Simmons) - 6:18
7. "Snake Man" (Johnston) - 2:40
8. "Five Corners" (McFee, Simmons) - 1:57
9. "Rainy Day Crossroad Blues" (Johnston) - 4:58
10. "Clear as the Driven Snow" (Simmons) - 5:47
11. "Don't Start Me Talkin'" (Sonny Boy Williamson) - 7:55
12. "Take Me in Your Arms (Rock Me a Little While)" (Holland-Dozier-Holland) - 3:45
13. "Little Bitty Pretty One" (Byrd) - 4:03
14. "Black Water" (Simmons) - 4:43
15. "Long Train Runnin'" (Johnston) - 6:09
16. "China Grove" (Johnston) - 3:22
17. "Listen to the Music" (Johnston) - 5:40

== DVD ==
1. "Rockin' Down the Highway" (Johnston)
2. "Jesus Is Just Alright" (A. Reynolds)
3. "Dangerous" (Simmons)
4. "Another Park, Another Sunday" (Johnston)
5. "People Gotta Love Again" (Johnston)
6. "Spirit" (Johnston)
7. "Steamer Lane" (instrumental) (Simmons)
8. "South City Midnight Lady" (Simmons)
9. "Snake Man" (Johnston)
10. "Nobody" (Johnston)
11. "Five Corners" (McFee/Simmons)
12. "Rainy Day Crossroad Blues" (Johnston)
13. "Clear as the Driven Snow" (Simmons)
14. "Neal's Fandango" (Simmons)
15. "Takin' It to the Streets" (McDonald)
16. "Don't Start Me Talkin'" (Sonny Boy Williamson)
17. "Take Me In Your Arms (Rock Me)" (Holland-Dozier-Holland)
18. "Little Bitty Pretty One" (Byrd)
19. "Black Water" (Simmons)
20. "Long Train Runnin'" (Johnston)
21. "China Grove" (Johnston)
22. "Without You" (Johnston/Simmons/Porter/Hartman/Hossack)
23. "Listen to the Music" (Johnston)

== Personnel ==
The Doobie Brothers

- Tom Johnston - guitars, vocals
- John McFee - guitars, dobro, pedal steel guitar, harmonica, violin, mandolin, vocals
- Patrick Simmons - guitars, banjo, vocals
- Michael Hossack - drums, percussion
- Keith Knudsen - drums, percussion, vocals

Additional personnel

- Guy Allison - keyboards, vocals, background vocals
- Skylark - bass, background vocals
- M. B. Gordy - percussion
- Marvin McFadden - trumpet
- Mic Gillette - trombone, trumpet
- Marc Russo - saxophone, horn arrangements

== Certifications ==
| Region | Certification | Certified units/sales |
|---|---|---|
| Australia (ARIA) | Gold | 7,500^{^} |
^{^} Shipments figures based on certification alone.
