= I Cheat the Hangman =

- Side A of the original US single

Single by The Doobie Brothers

from the album Stampede
- B-side: "Music Man"
- Released: November 12, 1975
- Recorded: Fall 1974
- Genre: Folk Rock, psychedelic rock
- Length: 6:34
- Label: Warner Bros.
- Songwriter: Patrick Simmons
- Producer: Ted Templeman

The Doobie Brothers singles chronology
"Sweet Maxine" (1975)	"I Cheat the Hangman" (1975)	"Takin' It to the Streets" (1976)

"I Cheat the Hangman" is a song by American rock band the Doobie Brothers released on November 12, 1975, as the third and final single from their album Stampede. The song spent four weeks on the Billboard Hot 100, peaking at No. 60.

== Composition and lyrics ==
The song was written by the band's guitarist, Patrick Simmons, and recounts the story of a man who leaves the gallows. Simmons stated that: "I think the piece may have been inspired by An Occurrence at Owl Creek Bridge, by Ambrose Bierce. It has the feel of an old west ghost town. In fact, it's about a ghost who doesn't realize he's dead returning to his home after the Civil War." According to Jeff Baxter, "I Cheat the Hangman" was done in three parts. The instrumentation includes guitars, piano, vocals, strings, bass and drums.

== Reception ==
Billboard called it an "acoustic cut somewhat along the line of "Black Water," but featuring more vocal harmonies and an easier overall sound" and that it is a "Change of pace for the generally rocking group, but one that should score well for them." Cashbox called it a "rather lengthy piece quite unlike any previous single release from this supergroup" and that it "is a low-key ballad carried by a single, melodic voice against flowing guitar picking that grows into beautiful vocal harmony from the group, soon to segue into sustained orchestration holding a sweeping power chord under which some jazz improvisation goes on." Record World stated that it is a "searing ballad that relies on a strong vocal harmony sound."

== Charts ==
Chart (1975)	Peak position
US Billboard Hot 100	60
