= Pacific Recorders =

Independent recording studio in San Mateo

Coordinates: 37.55154°N 122.31302°W

Pacific Recorders (also referred to as Pacific Recording) was an independent recording studio in San Mateo, California. Founded in 1968, the studio was the location for recordings by such notable artists as Santana, the Grateful Dead, The Doobie Brothers, Moby Grape, and Taj Majal.

== History ==
Pacific Recorders was founded in 1968 by guitarist and Mojo Men co-founder Paul Curcio, with equipment assembled by Bob Matthews and Betty Cantor of the Grateful Dead's sound crew. The studio was located at 1737 South El Camino Real in San Mateo, California.

The studio's chief engineer, Ron Wickersham, was also a design engineer at nearby Ampex, and Pacific Recording obtained the first Ampex MM-1000 16-track recorder in the Bay Area (and only the second in the U.S.). Wickersham designed and built a mixing console to accommodate the 16 tracks, making Pacific the first 16-track studio in the Bay Area. Wickersham left after less than a year to join the Grateful Dead's sound team and co-found Alembic with wife and company CEO Susan Wickersham, who he met at the studio.

Blue Cheer recorded their 1968 album, Outsideinside, at Pacific, and Santana recorded their eponymous debut studio album at the studio the following year, and returned in 1970 to record portions of its follow-up, Abraxas.

The Grateful Dead, who had been recording their third studio album at the similarly-named Pacific High Recording in San Francisco, was so interested in exploring the possibilities of 16-track recording that they moved to Pacific Recorders and re-recorded the entire album.

In 1970, the Doobie Brothers recorded their eponymous debut album at Pacific Other albums recorded at the studio included Moby Grape's 20 Granite Creek (1971), Taj Mahal's Happy Just to Be Like I Am (1971), and Crazy Horse's Loose (Crazy Horse album) (1972). In 1972, Herbie Hancock recorded Crossings at the studio.

From 1969 through 1973, producer David Rubinson and engineer Fred Catero utilized Pacific Recording for numerous Fillmore Records and San Francisco Records projects.

Curcio left Pacific in 1978 and founded Arrow Recording Studios. He would go on to found Music America Studios in 1982, where he produced Metallica's debut studio album, Kill 'Em All.
