= The Doobie Brothers (album) =

Studio album by The Doobie Brothers
- Released: April 30, 1971
- Recorded: November–December 1970
- Studios: Pacific Recording Studios, San Mateo
- Genres: Country rock; boogie rock
- Length: 35:54
- Label: Warner Bros.
- Producers: Lenny Waronker, Ted Templeman

The Doobie Brothers chronology
| The Doobie Brothers (1971) | Toulouse Street (1972) |

Singles from The Doobie Brothers
- 1. "Nobody" / "Slippery St. Paul" Released: May 26, 1971; 2. "Feelin' Down Farther" / "Travelin' Man" Released: September 1971; 3. "Beehive State" / "Closer Every Day" Released: November 1971

The Doobie Brothers is the debut studio album by American rock band The Doobie Brothers. The album was recorded at Pacific Recorders in San Mateo, California and released on April 30, 1971, by Warner Bros. Records. It is their only official studio album with all tracks featuring original bass player Dave Shogren, who left during the recording of their second album.

The first single from the album, "Nobody," failed to chart, as did the album itself (although the single made the "Bubbling Under" list at #122 in the July 17, 1971 Billboard Magazine). The single was re-released in October 1974 with a slightly edited length of 3:27 after the group had become a highly successful touring and recording act, peaking at #58 on the Billboard Hot 100. "Nobody" was later re-recorded for the group's 2010 album, World Gone Crazy.

== Track listing ==
Side one
| No. | Title | Writer(s) | Length |
|---|---|---|---|
| 1. | "Nobody" | Tom Johnston | 3:42 |
| 2. | "Slippery St. Paul" | Patrick Simmons | 2:14 |
| 3. | "Greenwood Creek" | Johnston | 3:04 |
| 4. | "It Won't Be Right" | Johnston, Simmons | 2:38 |
| 5. | "Travelin' Man" | Johnston | 4:25 |

Side two
| No. | Title | Writer(s) | Length |
|---|---|---|---|
| 6. | "Feelin' Down Farther" | Johnston | 4:20 |
| 7. | "The Master" | Johnston | 3:30 |
| 8. | "Growin' a Little Each Day" | Johnston | 3:20 |
| 9. | "Beehive State" | Randy Newman | 2:42 |
| 10. | "Closer Every Day" | Simmons | 4:19 |
| 11. | "Chicago" | Arr. by Simmons | 1:40 |

Professional ratings
Review scores
| Source | Rating |
|---|---|
| AllMusic | 2.5/5 stars |

== Personnel ==
=== The Doobie Brothers ===
- Tom Johnston – guitars, harmonica (3, 11), piano (8, 10), lead vocals (1–8, 11), backing vocals
- Patrick Simmons – guitars, lead vocals (9, 10), backing vocals
- Dave Shogren – bass, organ (10), backing vocals
- John Hartman – drums, tambourine (6)

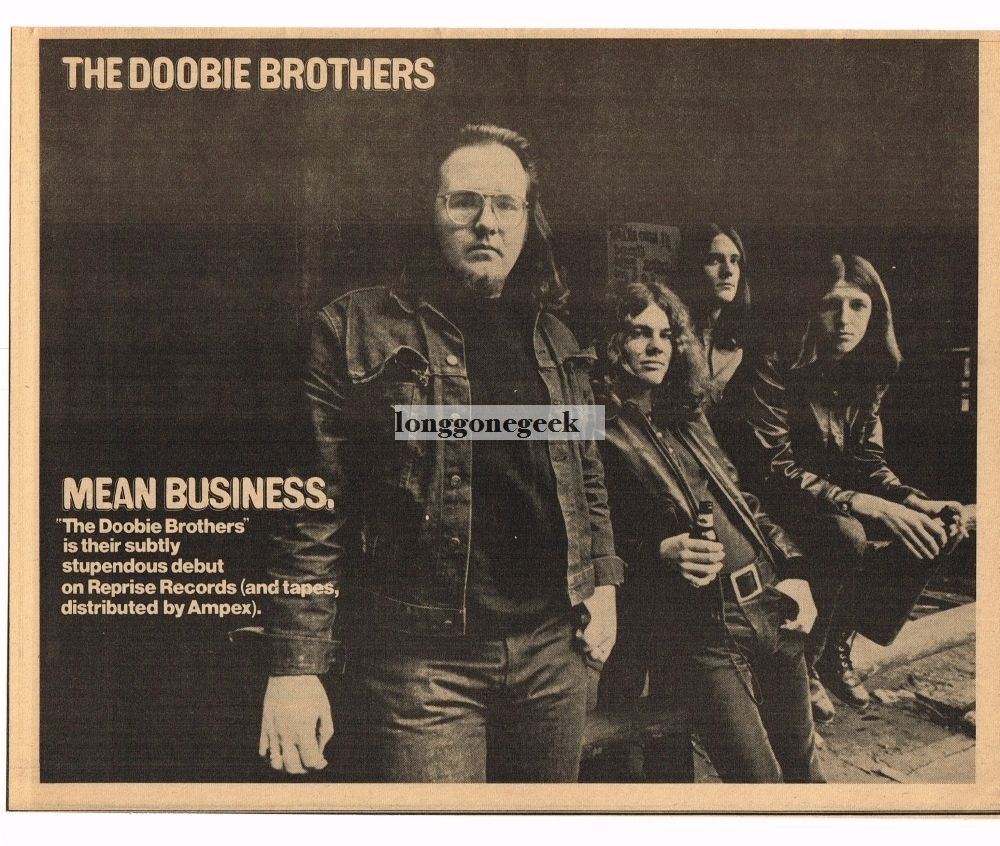
Trade ad for the album, 1971

=== Production ===
- Produced by Lenny Waronker and Ted Templeman
- Executive producers – Marty Cohn and Paul Curcio
- Engineered by Marty Cohn
- Mastered by Lee Herschberg
- Photography – Jim Marshall
- Art direction – Ed Thrasher
- Management – Paul Curcio and Marty Cohn
