= Southbound (The Doobie Brothers album) =

Studio album by the Doobie Brothers
- Released: November 4, 2014
- Genre: Country rock
- Length: 49:17
- Label: Arista Nashville
- Producer: David Lyndon Huff

The Doobie Brothers chronology
World Gone Crazy (2010)	Southbound (2014)	Liberté (2021)

Professional ratings
Review scores
Source	Rating
AllMusic	3/5 stars

Southbound is the fourteenth studio album by American rock band the Doobie Brothers featuring collaborations with various artists in remakes of various hits by the band. It was the group's only album that featured Tony Pia since he joined the band in 2010 (because of Hossack's retirement due to cancer and his death in 2012), before leaving the group in August 2016. It is also the band's last studio album to feature keyboardist/vocalist Guy Allison before his departure from the group in October 2015.

== Track listing ==
No.	Title	Writer(s)	Duet partner(s)	Length
1.	"Black Water"	Pat Simmons	Zac Brown Band	4:20
2.	"Listen to the Music"	Tom Johnston	Blake Shelton and Hunter Hayes	4:19
3.	"What a Fool Believes"	Kenny Loggins, Michael McDonald	Sara Evans	4:02
4.	"Long Train Runnin'"	Johnston	Toby Keith and Huey Lewis	3:32
5.	"China Grove"	Johnston	Chris Young	3:21
6.	"Takin' It to the Streets"	McDonald	Love and Theft	4:41
7.	"Jesus Is Just Alright"	Arthur Reynolds	Casey James	4:07
8.	"Rockin' Down the Highway"	Johnston	Brad Paisley	3:34
9.	"Take Me in Your Arms (Rock Me)"	Lamont Dozier, Brian Holland, Eddie Holland	Tyler Farr	3:45
10.	"South City Midnight Lady"	Simmons	Jerrod Niemann	4:48
11.	"You Belong to Me"	McDonald, Carly Simon	Amanda Sudano Ramirez and Vince Gill	3:44
12.	"Nobody (Intro)"	Simmons	Charlie Worsham	0:45
13.	"Nobody"	Johnston	Charlie Worsham	4:20
Total length:				49:17

== Personnel ==
Credits taken from the album's liner notes.

=== The Doobie Brothers ===
- Tom Johnston - lead vocals (tracks 2, 4, 5, 9, 13), electric guitar (tracks 2, 4, 5, 7, 9, 13), backing vocals (tracks 1, 2, 4–7, 9, 10, 13), guitar solo and acoustic guitar (track 13)
- Patrick Simmons - lead vocals (track 1), lead guitar (track 2), acoustic guitar (tracks 1, 10, 12, 13), backing vocals (tracks 1, 2, 4–10, 13)
- John McFee - electric guitar (tracks 7, 9), banjo (tracks 2, 13), autoharp (track 1), fiddle (track 4), guitar solo (track 6), steel guitar solo (track 10), slide resonator guitar (track 12), backing vocals (tracks 1, 2, 4–9, 13)
- Michael McDonald - lead vocals and keyboards (tracks 3, 6, 11), backing vocals (tracks 1–3, 6–8, 11)

=== Additional musicians ===
- Zac Brown - lead vocals (track 1)
- Tom Bukovac - electric guitar (tracks 1, 2, 4, 5, 7, 8, 10)
- Clay Cook - backing vocals (track 1)
- J. T. Corenflos - electric guitar (tracks 1–8, 10, 11, 13)
- John Cowan - backing vocals (tracks 3, 10)
- Jimmy De Martini - fiddle & backing vocals (track 1)
- Dan Dugmore - steel guitar (tracks 1–8, 11, 13), dobro (track 1)
- Sara Evans - lead vocals (track 3)
- Tyler Farr - lead vocals (track 9)
- Shannon Forrest - drums (tracks 3, 6)
- Vince Gill - guitar solo (track 11)
- Eric Gunderson - lead vocals (track 6)
- Vicki Hampton - backing vocals (track 9)
- Hunter Hayes - guitar (track 2)
- Aubrey Haynie - fiddle (tracks 1, 4)
- John Driskell Hopkins - backing vocals (track 1)
- Larry Hall - violin, viola, cello, & orchestration (track 10); trombone & trumpet (track 11)
- Dann Huff - guitar solo (track 5)
- Casey James - lead vocals & guitar solo (track 7)
- Charlie Judge - keyboards (tracks 1, 2, 5, 7–10, 13)
- Toby Keith - lead vocals (track 4)
- Huey Lewis - harmonica (track 4)
- Stephen Barker Liles - lead vocals (track 6)
- Tony Lucido - bass (tracks 7, 9, 13)
- Chris McHugh - drums (tracks 1, 2, 4, 5, 7–10, 13)
- Jerry McPherson - electric guitar (tracks 1–6, 8–11, 13)
- Wendy Moten - backing vocals (track 9)
- Jerrod Niemann - lead vocals (track 10)
- Brad Paisley - lead vocals & lead guitar (track 8)
- Michael Rojas - keyboards (tracks 3, 4, 6, 11)
- Blake Shelton - lead vocals (track 2)
- Tommy Sims - bass (tracks 3, 4, 6, 11)
- Jimmie Lee Sloas - bass (tracks 1, 2, 5, 10)
- Amanda Sudano-Ramirez - lead vocals (track 11)
- Bryan Sutton - acoustic guitar (tracks 3, 6, 11), mandolin (track 11)
- Ilya Toshinsky - acoustic guitar (tracks 1, 2, 4, 5, 7–10, 13), banjo (tracks 1, 4–6), bouzouki (tracks 1, 2, 5, 10, 13), mandolin (track 13)
- Charlie Worsham - lead vocals & banjo (track 13)
- Chris Young - lead vocals (track 5)

== Chart performance ==
Chart (2014)	Peak position
US Billboard 200	16
US Top Country Albums (Billboard)	7
