= World Gone Crazy (The Doobie Brothers album) =

Studio album by The Doobie Brothers
- Released: September 28, 2010
- Recorded: 2007–2010
- Genres: Country rock, southern rock
- Length: 55:21
- Label: HOR
- Producer: Ted Templeman

The Doobie Brothers chronology
The Very Best Of (2007)	World Gone Crazy (2010)	Southbound (2014)

Singles from World Gone Crazy
- 1. "Nobody" Released: August 17, 2010

Professional ratings
Review scores
Source	Rating
AllMusic	3.5/5 stars

World Gone Crazy is the thirteenth studio album by American rock band The Doobie Brothers, released on September 28, 2010. It debuted at number 39 on the Billboard top 200 albums chart, their highest charting position since 1989. The first single is a remake of their 1971 debut single "Nobody". Tom Johnston states about the album "This album has been in the mix for five years, but we didn’t seriously start putting the nuts and bolts together until three years ago."

Songwriting was split between guitarists Pat Simmons and Tom Johnston. The latter wrote the title track and he told Songfacts: "Part of the inspiration of 'World Gone Crazy' is the world has gotten a little nuts. And between the wars that we've had, between violence in the streets and most of the cities, what people are doing to each other around the world is not stuff that would have happened 20 years ago."

It was the first Doobie Brothers album to be produced by Ted Templeman since Farewell Tour twenty-seven years previously. Templeman had produced or co-produced every Doobie Brothers album up to that one. It was also the last of the group's albums to feature drummer Michael Hossack who died from cancer in 2012. Hossack's place in the touring band would be taken by former Brian Setzer sidesman Tony Pia. Harmonica player Norton Buffalo makes a posthumous appearance on "Don't Say Goodbye", which also features Michael McDonald on vocals.

== Track listing ==
No.	Title	Writer(s)	Lead vocals	Length
1.	"A Brighter Day"	Tom Johnston	Tom Johnston	3:54
2.	"Chateau"	Patrick Simmons, Ted Templeman	Patrick Simmons	4:18
3.	"Nobody"	Johnston	Johnston	4:35
4.	"World Gone Crazy"	Johnston	Johnston	5:10
5.	"Far from Home"	Patrick Simmons, Templeman	Simmons	3:45
6.	"Young Man's Game"	Johnston	Johnston	5:32
7.	"Don't Say Goodbye" (feat. Michael McDonald)	Simmons, Templeman	Simmons	4:53
8.	"My Baby"	Johnston	Johnston	4:03
9.	"Old Juarez"	Johnston	Johnston	3:47
10.	"I Know We Won" (feat. Willie Nelson)	Willie Nelson, Simmons	Simmons, Willie Nelson	4:05
11.	"Law Dogs"	Johnston	Johnston	3:10
12.	"Little Prayer" (bonus track)	Simmons	Simmons	2:57
13.	"New York Dream" (bonus track)	Johnston	Johnston	4:39
14.	"Delta Devil Dog" (Japan Only)	McFee		0:45
15.	"Lie To Me" (Japan Only)	Johnston		3.59

iTunes Edition
No.	Title	Writer(s)	Length
12.	"Little Prayer"	Simmons	2:57
13.	"New York Dream"	Johnston	4:39
14.	"Black Water" (Live on Acoustic Café Big Sky)	Simmons	3:59
15.	"Nobody" (Live on Acoustic Café Big Sky)	Johnston	5:04

== Personnel ==
=== The Doobie Brothers ===
- Tom Johnston - lead and backing vocals, acoustic guitars, electric guitars
- Pat Simmons - lead and backing vocals, acoustic guitars, electric guitars
- John McFee - backing vocals, acoustic guitars, electric guitars, banjo, mandolin, violin; drums, percussion (10)
- Michael Hossack - drums, percussion

=== Additional musicians ===
- Michael McDonald - vocals (7)
- Willie Nelson - vocals (10)
- Ross Hogarth - guitar (4); drums, percussion (10)
- Tim Pierce - guitar (4)
- Bob Glaub - bass (all but 10)
- James Hutchinson - bass (10)
- Gregg Bissonette - drums (4, 6)
- Joey Waronker - drums (8)
- Karl Perazzo - percussion (1, 6, 9, 13)
- Ted Templeman - tambourine (2)
- Guy Allison - piano, Wurlitzer electric piano, Hammond organ, other keyboards
- Bill Payne - piano (2, 4, 6, 8, 11), Hammond organ (1, 2, 4, 11, 13)
- Kim Bullard - synthesizer (5), keyboards (7, 9), piano (9)
- Norton Buffalo - harmonica (7)
- Marc Russo - saxophones (4, 13)
- Mic Gillette - trumpets, trombones (4, 13)
- Cameron Stone - cello (5)
- Siedah Garrett - backing vocals (1)
- Dorian Holley - backing vocals (1, 8, 13)
- Nayanna Holley - backing vocals (1, 13)
- Darryl Phinnessee - backing vocals (1, 8)
- Amy Holland-McDonald - backing vocals (7)
- Gail Swanson - backing vocals (7)
- Tim James - backing vocals (9)
