= The Doobie Brothers =

American rock band

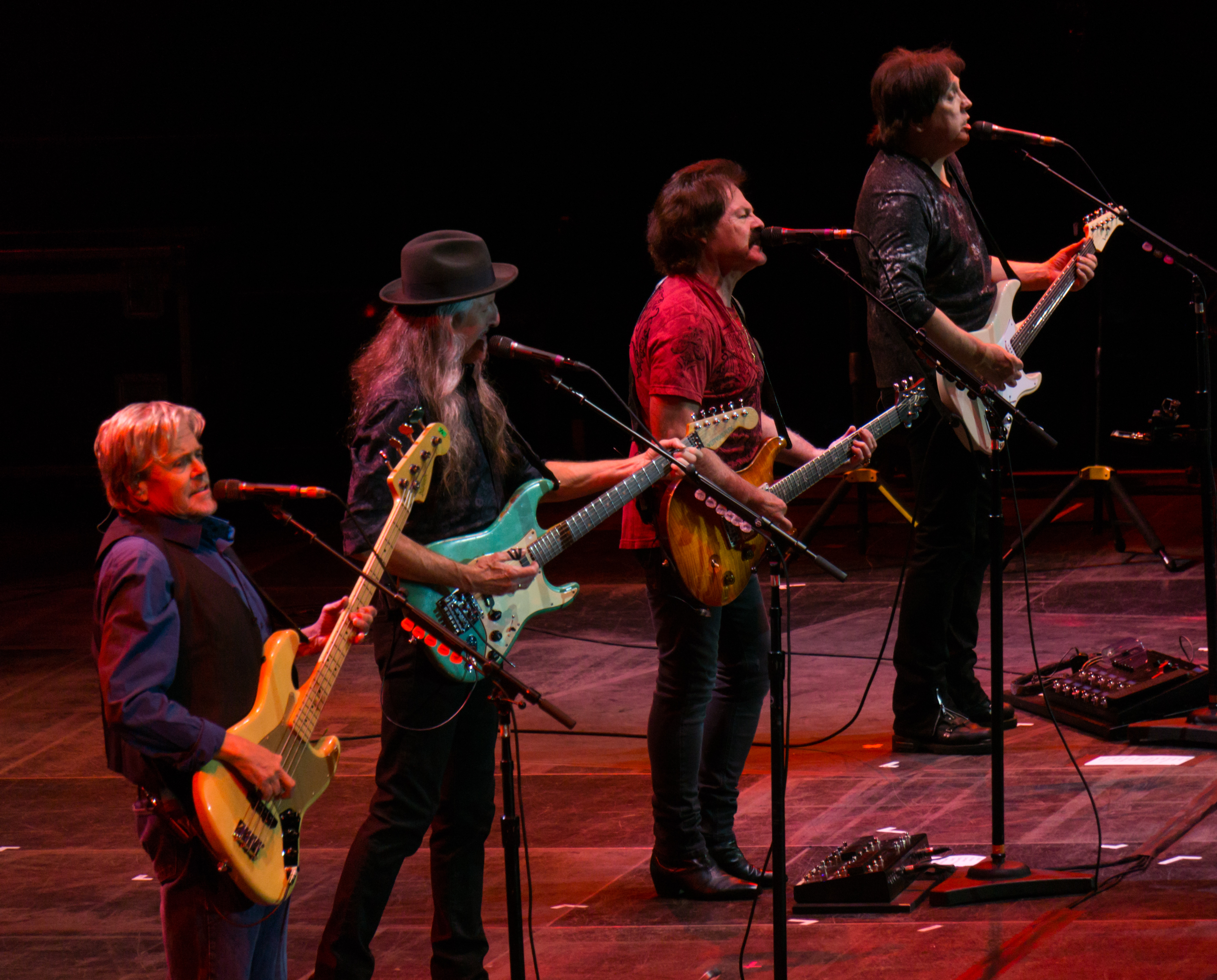
- The Doobie Brothers performing in 2017. From left: touring member John Cowan, Patrick Simmons, Tom Johnston, and John McFee.

Background information
- Also known as: The Doobies
- Origin: San Jose, California, U.S.
- Genres: Rock; soft rock; pop; blue-eyed soul
- Works: Discography
- Years active: 1970–1982; 1987–present
- Labels: Warner Bros.; Capitol; Arista; Sony
- Spinoffs: Southern Pacific
- Members: Tom Johnston; Patrick Simmons; Michael McDonald; John McFee
- Past members: See: List of the Doobie Brothers band members
- Website: thedoobiebrothers.com

The Doobie Brothers is an American rock band formed in San Jose, California, in 1970. Known for their flexibility in performing across numerous genres and their vocal harmonies, the band has been active for over five decades, with their greatest success taking place in the 1970s. The group's current lineup consists of founding members Tom Johnston (guitars, keyboards, harmonica, vocals) and Patrick Simmons (guitars, banjo, recorder, vocals), alongside Michael McDonald (keyboards, synthesizers, mandolin, vocals) and John McFee (guitars, pedal steel guitar, mandolin, banjo, violin, cello, harmonica, vocals), and touring musicians including John Cowan (bass, vocals), Marc Russo (saxophones), Ed Toth (drums), and Marc Quiñones (percussion, backing vocals). Long-serving former members include guitarist Jeff "Skunk" Baxter, bassist Tiran Porter, and drummers John Hartman, Michael Hossack, and Keith Knudsen.

Johnston provided the lead vocals from 1970 to 1975, when they featured a mainstream rock sound with elements of folk, country and R&B. McDonald joined the band in 1975 as a keyboardist and additional lead vocalist, to give some relief to Johnston, who was suffering health problems at the time. McDonald's interest in soul music introduced a new sound to the band. Johnston, Simmons, Porter, and McDonald performed together as lead vocalists for one album, Takin' It to the Streets, before Johnston left in 1977. Frequent lineup changes followed through the rest of the 1970s, and the band broke up in 1982 with Simmons the only constant member having appeared on all of their albums. In 1987, the Doobie Brothers reformed with Johnston back in the fold. McDonald, who made several guest appearances after their reformation, returned full-time in 2019.

The group's sixteen studio albums include six top-ten appearances on the Billboard 200 album chart. Their 1978 album Minute by Minute reached number one for five weeks, and won a Grammy for Best Pop Vocal Performance by a Duo or Group. Their song "What a Fool Believes" from that album, written by McDonald and Kenny Loggins, won two Grammys, including Song of the Year and Record of the Year. The band had 16 Billboard Hot 100 top-40 hits, including "Listen to the Music", "Jesus Is Just Alright", "Long Train Runnin'", "China Grove", "Black Water" (#1 in 1974), "Takin' It to the Streets", "What a Fool Believes" (#1 in 1979), and "The Doctor", all of which receive rotation on classic hits radio stations. They have also released six live albums and numerous greatest hits compilations, including 1976's Best of the Doobies, certified diamond by the RIAA for reaching album sales of ten million copies. The Doobie Brothers were inducted into the Vocal Group Hall of Fame in 2004, and the Rock and Roll Hall of Fame in 2020. The group has sold more than 40 million records worldwide.

== Career ==
=== Original incarnation ===
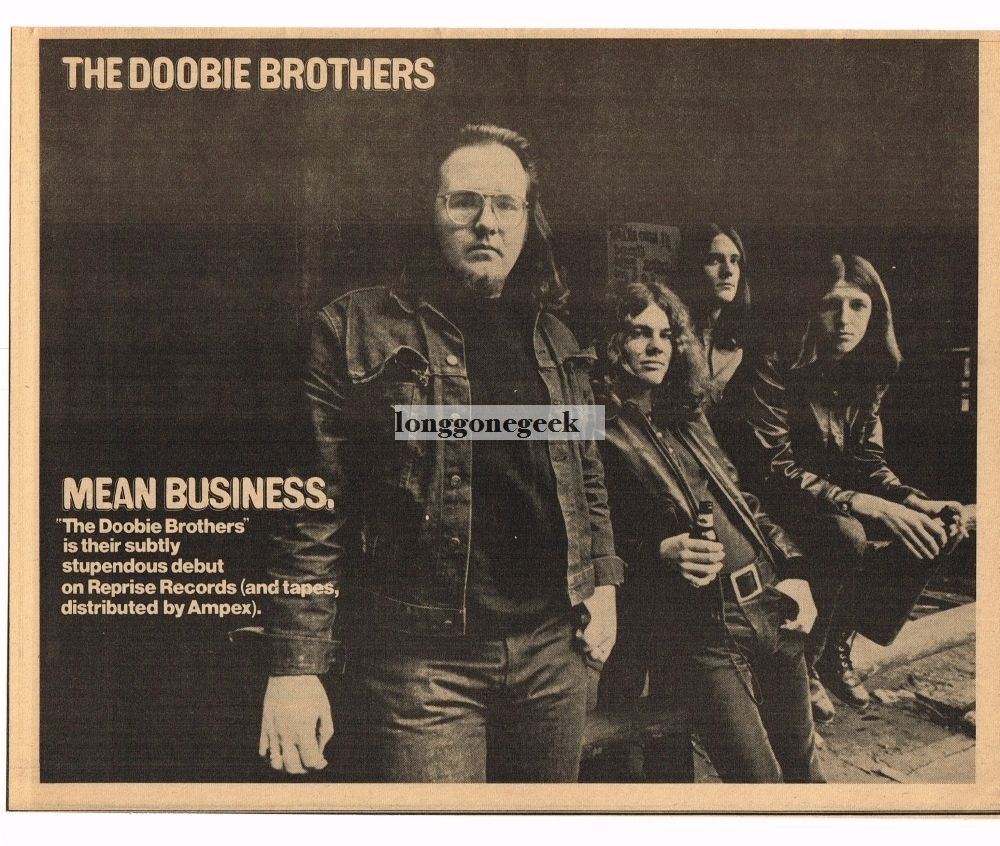
Trade ad for the band's self-titled debut album, 1971

Drummer John Hartman arrived in California in 1969 determined to meet Skip Spence of Moby Grape and join an aborted Grape reunion. Spence introduced Hartman to singer, guitarist, and songwriter Tom Johnston and the two proceeded to form the nucleus of what would become the Doobie Brothers. Johnston and Hartman called their fledgling group "Pud" and experimented with lineups (occasionally including Spence) and styles as they performed in and around San Jose. They were mostly a power trio (along with bassist Greg Murphy) but briefly worked with a horn section.

In 1970 they teamed up with singer, guitarist, and songwriter Patrick Simmons and bassist Dave Shogren. Simmons had belonged to several area groups (among them "Scratch", an acoustic trio with future Doobies bassist Tiran Porter) and also performed as a solo artist. He was already an accomplished fingerstyle player whose approach to the instrument complemented Johnston's rhythmic R&B strumming.

While still playing locally around San Jose, the group adopted the name "Doobie Brothers". Their friend Keith Rosen came up with the name after the band had difficulty coming up with one on their own. According to Tom Johnston, Rosen said, "Why don't you call yourself the Doobie Brothers because you're always smoking pot?" Hartman has said he was not involved with choosing the name, and did not know that "doobie" meant a marijuana joint until Rosen told him. Everyone in the band agreed that "Doobie Brothers" was a "dumb" or "stupid" name. Simmons has said the band intended to use the name only for a few early performances until they came up with something better, but they never did.

The Doobie Brothers improved their playing by performing live all over Northern California in 1970. They attracted a particularly strong following among local chapters of the Hells Angels and got a recurring gig at one of the bikers' favorite venues, the Chateau Liberté in the Santa Cruz mountains, playing there through the summer of 1975 (although some of these concerts did not include all band members and were of an impromptu nature). A set of demos, which showcased fuzz-toned dual lead electric guitars, three-part harmonies and Hartman's drumming, caught the ear of Warner Brothers' staff A & R representative and former member of '60s pop band Harpers Bizarre, Ted Templeman who eventually earned the group a contract at Warner Bros. Records before the year (1970) was out.

The band's image originally reflected that of their biggest fans—leather jackets and motorcycles. Released in April 1971, their self-titled debut album departed significantly from that image and their live sound of the period. Produced at Pacific Recorders in San Mateo, the album, which failed to chart, emphasized acoustic guitars and reflected country influences. The leadoff song "Nobody", the band's first single, has surfaced in their live set several times over the ensuing decades. Most recently, this song was re-recorded and added to their 2010 album World Gone Crazy.

In the late spring/summer of 1971, their record label sent the Doobies out on their first national tour in tandem with the group Mother Earth, the "Mother Brothers Tour". Also in 1971, the group toyed with the idea of adding a second drummer, supplementing Hartman's drumming on some of their shows with that of United States Navy veteran Michael Hossack while still touring behind their first album.

Moving to Warner Brothers' newly acquired Amigo Studios in North Hollywood starting in late October 1971, the band recorded several songs for their next album with Shogren on bass, guitar, and background vocals, but Shogren left after disagreements with the group's producer, Ted Templeman. Shogren was replaced in December 1971 with singer, songwriter, and bass guitarist Tiran Porter, while Hossack was added to the lineup at the same time as a regular. Porter and Hossack were both stalwarts of the Northern California music scene, Porter having previously played in Scratch with Simmons. Porter brought a funkier bass style and added his husky baritone to the voices of Johnston and Simmons, resulting in a rich three-part blend.

The band's second album, Toulouse Street (which contained the hits "Listen to the Music" and "Jesus Is Just Alright"), brought their breakthrough success after its release in July 1972. In collaboration with manager Bruce Cohn, producer Ted Templeman and engineer Donn Landee, the band put forward a more polished and eclectic set of songs. Pianist Bill Payne of Little Feat contributed keyboards for the first time, beginning a decades-long collaboration that included many recording sessions and even a two-week stint touring with the band in early 1974.

A string of hits followed, including Johnston's "Long Train Runnin'" and "China Grove", from the 1973 album The Captain and Me. Other noteworthy songs on the album were Simmons' country-ish ode "South City Midnight Lady" and the explosive, hard rocking raveup "Without You", for which the entire band received songwriting credit. Onstage, the latter song sometimes stretched into a 15-minute jam with additional lyrics completely ad-libbed by Johnston. A 1973 appearance on the debut episode of the television music variety show Don Kirshner's Rock Concert featured one such performance of the tune.

In the midst of recording sessions for their next album, 1974's What Were Once Vices Are Now Habits, and rehearsals for a 1973 fall tour, Hossack abruptly departed the band, citing burnout from constant touring. Drummer, songwriter, and vocalist Keith Knudsen (who previously drummed for Lee Michaels of "Do You Know What I Mean" fame) was recruited in September 1973 and left with the Doobies on a major tour a few weeks later (Hossack subsequently replaced Knudsen in the band Bonaroo, which served as an opening act for the Doobies shortly thereafter). Both Hossack's drums and Knudsen's voice are heard on What Were Once Vices Are Now Habits.

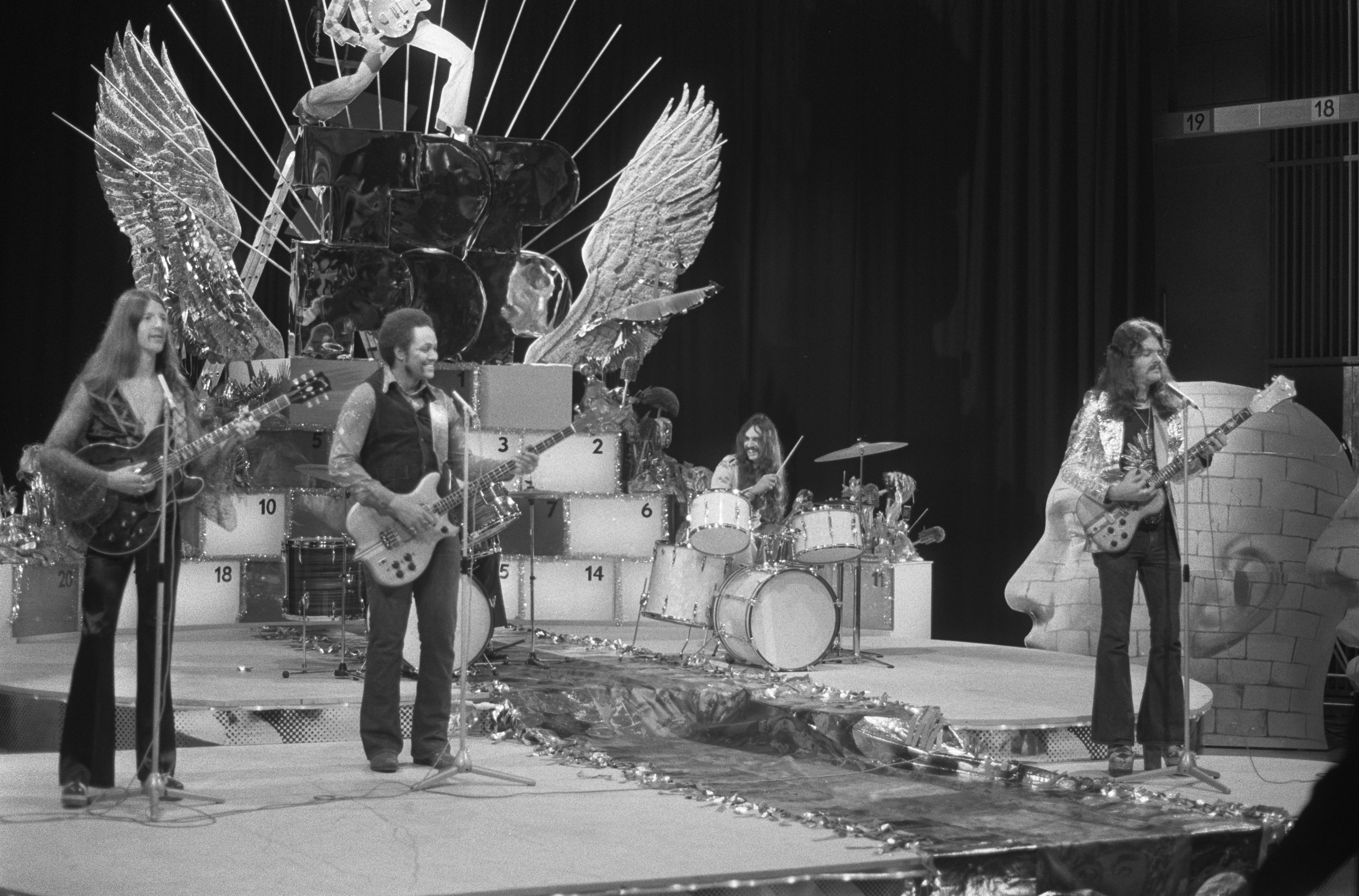
Doobie Bros in the Dutch TV show TopPop (January 1974). L–R: Simmons, Porter, Knudsen, Johnston

In 1974, Steely Dan guitarist Jeff "Skunk" Baxter learned that his band was retiring from the road and that Donald Fagen and Walter Becker intended to work almost exclusively with session players in the future. In need of a steady gig, he joined the Doobie Brothers as third lead guitarist in the middle of their tour. He had previously worked with the band both live and in the studio, adding pedal steel guitar to both The Captain and Me ("South City Midnight Lady") and What Were Once Vices Are Now Habits ("Black Water", "Tell Me What You Want") and was already playing with the band as a special guest during that year's tour.

What Were Once Vices Are Now Habits included the band's first No. 1 single, Simmons' signature tune "Black Water". It topped the charts in March 1975 and eventually propelled the album to multi-platinum status. Johnston's lyrical "Another Park, Another Sunday" (as a single, it featured "Black Water" as the B-side) and his horn-driven funk song "Eyes of Silver" also charted the year before at numbers 32 & 52, respectively.

During this period and for several subsequent tours, the Doobies were often supported on stage by Stax Records mainstays the Memphis Horns. Live recordings with the horn section have aired on radio on the King Biscuit Flower Hour, but none have been officially released. The Memphis Horns also appeared as session players on multiple Doobies albums.

By the end of 1974, Johnston's health was suffering from the rigors of the road. He was absent when the band joined the Beach Boys, Chicago, and Olivia Newton-John on Dick Clark's New Year's Rockin' Eve that December. By then, the western-themed Stampede had been completed for release in 1975. It featured yet another hit single, the Holland–Dozier–Holland-written Motown hit "Take Me in Your Arms" (originally sung by Kim Weston and also recorded by the Isley Brothers, Blood Sweat and Tears and Mother Earth). Simmons contributed the atmospheric "I Cheat the Hangman", as well as "Neal's Fandango", an ode to Santa Cruz, Jack Kerouac and Neal Cassady. Ry Cooder added his slide guitar to Johnston's cowboy song, "Rainy Day Crossroad Blues".

By the start of the Spring 1975 promotional tour for Stampede, Johnston's condition was so precarious that he required emergency hospitalization for a bleeding ulcer. With Johnston convalescing and the tour already underway, Baxter proposed recruiting a fellow Steely Dan alum to fill the hole: singer, songwriter, and keyboardist Michael McDonald. Simmons, Knudsen, Porter and McDonald divided Johnston's singing parts on tour while Simmons and Baxter shared lead guitar responsibilities.

=== Michael McDonald years ===
Under contract to release another album in 1976, the Doobies were at a crossroads. Their primary songwriter and singer remained unavailable, so they turned to McDonald and Porter for material to supplement that of Simmons. The resulting LP, Takin' It to the Streets, debuted a radical change in their sound. Their electric guitar-based rock and roll gave way to a more soft rock and blue-eyed soul sound, emphasizing keyboards and horns and subtler, more syncopated rhythms. Baxter contributed jazz-inflected guitar stylings reminiscent of Steely Dan, along with unusual, complex harmony and longer, more developed melody. Above all, McDonald's voice became the band's new signature sound. Takin' It to the Streets featured McDonald's title track and "It Keeps You Runnin'", both hits. (A second version of "It Keeps You Runnin'", performed by Carly Simon, appeared on her album Another Passenger, with the Doobies backing her.) Bassist Porter wrote and sang "For Someone Special" as a tribute to the absent Johnston. A greatest hits compilation, Best of the Doobies, followed before year's end. (In 1996, the Recording Industry Association of America certified Best of the Doobies "Diamond" for sales in excess of 10 million units.)

Their new sound was further refined, and McDonald's dominant role cemented with 1977's Livin' on the Fault Line. It featured a recording of the Motown classic "Little Darling (I Need You)" and "Echoes of Love", which had been written by Willie Mitchell for, but not recorded by, Al Green. Mitchell (then of the Memphis Horns) and Earl Randle had both worked with Green a good bit. Simmons added some music and lyrics, co-writing the finished version with Mitchell and Randle; the song was later recorded by the Pointer Sisters and by Lyn Paul, the ex-New Seekers vocalist. The album also featured the song "You Belong to Me" (co-written by McDonald and Carly Simon, who had a hit with her own version of the tune). To help promote Livin' on the Fault Line, the band performed live on the PBS show Soundstage. Baxter used an early type of guitar synthesizer (made by Roland) on many of the tracks (especially the title track and "Chinatown").

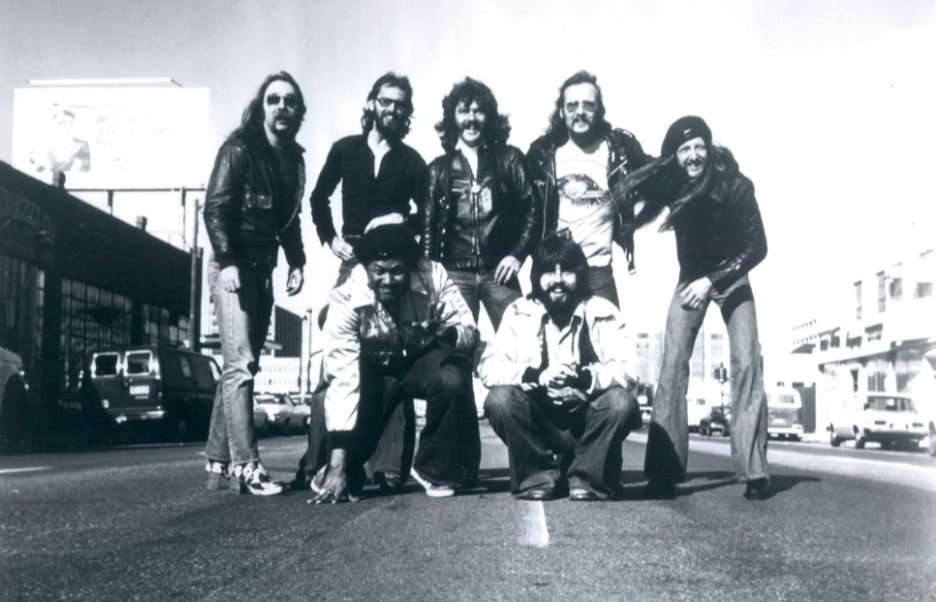
The Doobie Brothers in 1976: Back row L-R: Baxter, Knudsen, Johnston, Hartman, Simmons. Front row L-R: Porter, McDonald

Both Takin' It to the Streets and Livin' on the Fault Line reflected Johnston's diminished role in the group following his illness. Restored to fitness and briefly back in the fold, he contributed one original song to Takin' It to the Streets ("Turn It Loose"), and also sang a verse on Simmons' tune "Wheels of Fortune". He also made live appearances with the band in 1976 (documented in a concert filmed that year at the Winterland in San Francisco, excerpts of which appear occasionally on VH1 Classic) but was sidelined once again that fall due to exhaustion. The Doobie Brothers recorded five new Johnston compositions for Livin' on the Fault Line, but Johnston decided the band's direction had strayed too far from their original sound. He left the band he co-founded, withdrew permission for the Doobie Brothers to use the five songs he contributed to Livin' on the Fault Line, and embarked on a solo career that eventually yielded one modestly successful 1979 Warner Brothers album, Everything You've Heard is True, which featured the single "Savannah Nights", and the less successful album Still Feels Good in 1981. Regardless, he received credit for guitars and vocals on Livin' on the Fault Line and was pictured on the album's inner sleeve band photo.

During this period of transition, the band also elevated former roadie Bobby LaKind to onstage backup vocalist and percussionist. In the studio, LaKind first contributed percussion to Takin' It to the Streets but had been a member of the band's lighting crew since 1974. Additionally, in January 1978, the band appeared as themselves in two episodes of the ABC sitcom What's Happening!!, performing "Echoes of Love," "Little Darlin' (I Need You)", "Black Water", "Takin' It to the Streets", and "Take Me in Your Arms". Performances were done live (versus lip synching to a pre-recorded track), with some overdubs added in post production, notably during Baxter's solo on "Take Me in Your Arms (Rock Me a Little While)," which was lifted from the album version.

After almost a decade on the road, and with seven albums to their credit, the Doobies' profile was substantially elevated by the success of their next album, 1978's Minute by Minute. It spent five weeks atop the charts and dominated several radio formats for the better part of two years. McDonald's song "What a Fool Believes", written with Kenny Loggins, was the band's second No. 1 single and earned the songwriting duo (along with producer Ted Templeman) a Grammy Award for Record of the Year. The album won a Grammy for Pop Vocal Performance by a Group and was nominated for Album of the Year. Both "What a Fool Believes" and the title track were nominated for Song of the Year, with "What a Fool Believes" winning the award. Among the other memorable songs on the album are "Here to Love You", "Dependin' On You" (co-written by McDonald and Simmons), "Steamer Lane Breakdown" (a Simmons bluegrass instrumental) and McDonald's "How Do the Fools Survive?" (co-written by Carole Bayer Sager). Nicolette Larson and departed former bandleader Johnston contributed guest vocals on the album.

Minute by Minute's triumph was bittersweet because it coincided with the dissolution of the band. The pressure of touring while recording and releasing an album each year had worn the members down. Baxter and McDonald had been in creative conflict for some time. McDonald desired a direct, soulful and polished rock/R&B sound, while Baxter insisted on embellishing guitar parts in an increasingly avant-garde style. (Both McDonald and Baxter elaborated on the matter in the documentary series Behind the Music, which aired on VH1 in February 2001.) The Doobie Brothers toured Japan in early 1979 to support Minute by Minute, but upon their return, the band broke up. Once Minute by Minute's success became apparent, they opted to reunite, but without Baxter, who McDonald felt he could no longer work with. Hartman and LaKind also left the band. (Hartman subsequently joined Johnston's touring band in 1979 and taped an appearance with him that aired on Soundstage in 1980.)

Looking to capitalize on the momentum provided by the success of "Minute by Minute", the remaining Doobies (Simmons, Knudsen, McDonald and Porter) decided to embark on a national tour with a reconstituted lineup. In 1979 Hartman was replaced by session drummer Chet McCracken and Baxter by multi-instrumental string player John McFee (late of Huey Lewis's early band Clover); Cornelius Bumpus (who had been part of a recent reunion of Moby Grape) was also recruited to add vocals, keyboards, saxophones, and flute to the lineup. This lineup toured throughout 1979, including stops at Madison Square Garden and New York City's Battery Park for the No Nukes benefit shows with like-minded artists such as Bonnie Raitt, Crosby, Stills & Nash, James Taylor, Carly Simon, Jackson Browne, Bruce Springsteen and John Hall.

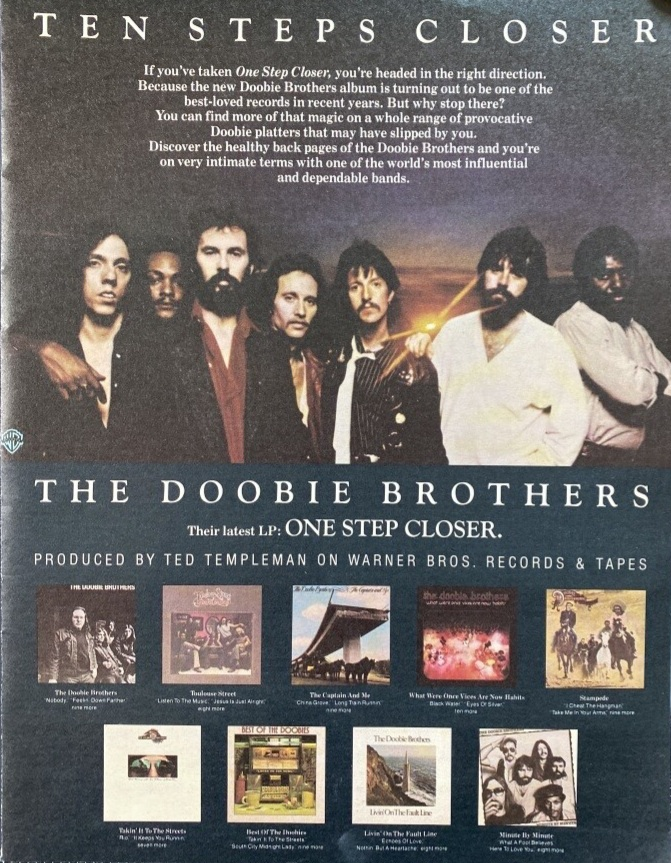
Trade ad for One Step Closer, 1981

1980 marked LaKind's return to the lineup as a full-time member and the Doobies' ninth studio album, One Step Closer. The LP featured the hit title track and the Top 10 hit "Real Love" (not to be confused with the John Lennon song) but did not dominate the charts and the radio as Minute by Minute had, largely due to an oversaturation of the "McDonald sound" by many other artists (such as Robbie Dupree's hit "Steal Away", which copied the "McDonald sound" nearly note for note) on the radio at the time—not to mention McDonald's numerous guest vocal appearances on hits by other artists, such as Kenny Loggins, Christopher Cross, Lauren Wood and Nicolette Larson. The album itself was also noticeably weaker musically than the previous three with the band sounding tired and seemingly devolving to little more than McDonald's "backup band" (according to contemporary sources). "Ted and Michael became one faction against Pat and the rest of us", Porter said in an interview. Long frustrated with the realities of relentless touring and yearning for a stable home life, as well as battling an admitted cocaine problem, Porter left the band after the recording of Closer. Session bassist Willie Weeks joined the band and the Doobies continued touring throughout 1980 and 1981 (post-Doobies, Weeks has performed with the Gregg Allman Band, Eric Clapton, and many others).

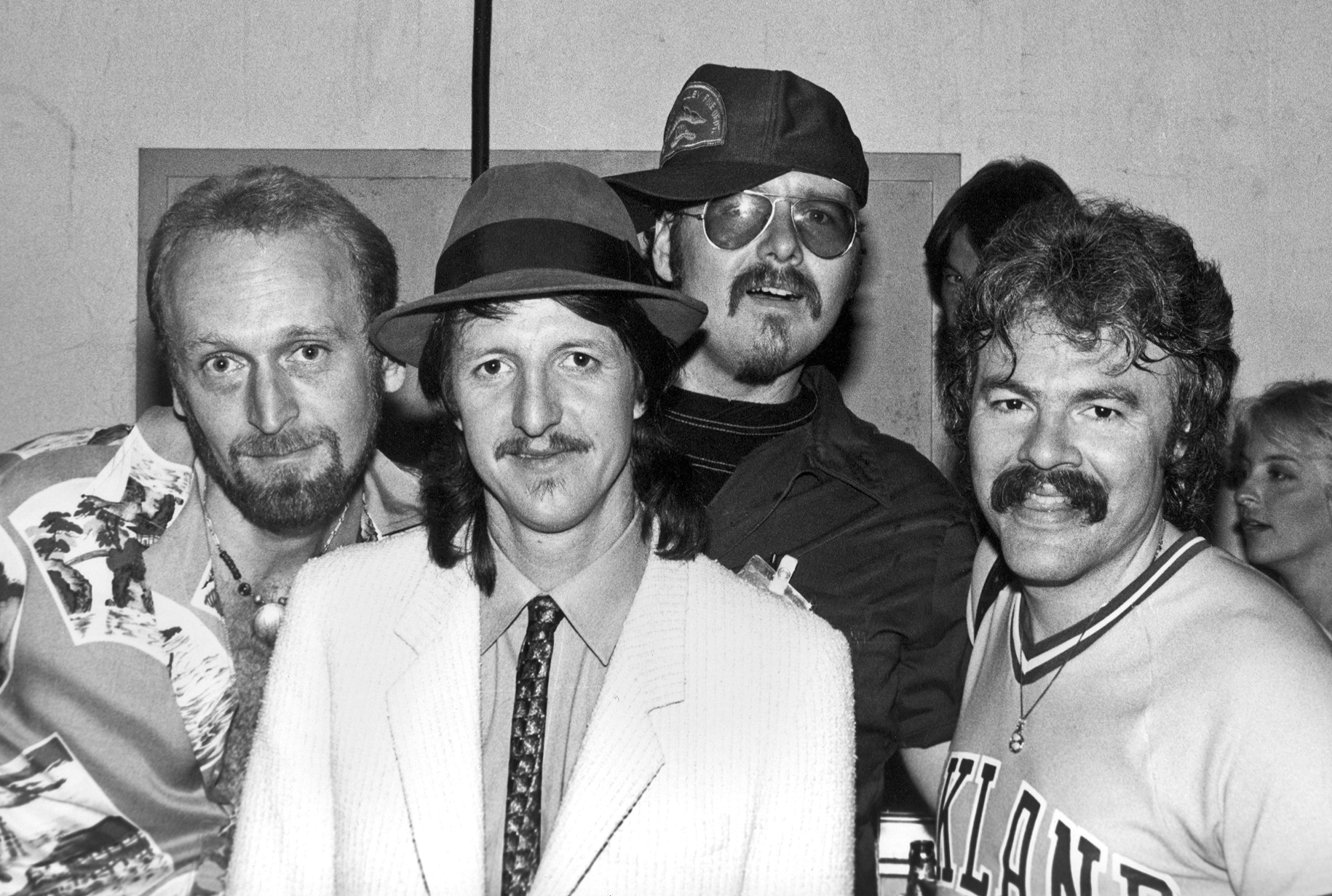
Backstage at the Greek Theater in Berkeley, California in 1982. This would be the farewell concert for the band's original run, and featured a one-off return of founding vocalist Tom Johnston (far right).

Also, during the 1981 tour, veteran session drummer Andy Newmark stepped in briefly for Knudsen, who was then in rehab. And by the end of 1981, even Simmons had left the band. Now with no remaining original members and a "leader" in McDonald who was ready for a solo career, the group elected instead to disband after a rehearsal without Simmons, according to an interview with McDonald for Listen to the Music, the Doobie Brothers' official video history/documentary released in 1989. He went on to say that by that point they could not have gotten further away from the Doobies sound if they had tried. Simmons, already at work on his first solo album, Arcade, rejoined for a 1982 farewell tour on the condition that this truly would be the end of the Doobie Brothers. At their last concert at the Greek Theatre in Berkeley, California, on September 11, 1982, they were joined onstage by founding member Tom Johnston for what was presumed to be the final rendition of his staple, "China Grove". Former members Porter, Hossack and Hartman subsequently took the stage for an extended version of "Listen to the Music". Knudsen sang lead vocals while Johnston, Simmons and McFee traded licks on guitar. The live album Farewell Tour was released in 1983 and the Greek Theatre concert was released in 2011 as Live at the Greek Theatre 1982.

=== Reunion ===
The Doobies did not work together for the next five years, though various members got together in different configurations for annual Christmas season performances for the patients and staff at the Stanford Children's Hospital in the Bay area. Simmons released a commercially disappointing solo album, Arcade, in April 1983. During the mid-1980s, Johnston toured U.S. clubs with a band called Border Patrol, which did not release any recordings. Hossack and (briefly) Simmons worked with the group. Around 1986, Johnston and Simmons began working on an album together (according to a 1989 interview with Simmons) but abandoned the project soon after with no known finished tracks.

In 1983, Knudsen and McFee formed the band Southern Pacific and recorded four albums that found success in the country charts (former Creedence Clearwater Revival bassist Stu Cook joined the band in 1986 and former Pablo Cruise guitarist David Jenkins in 1988).

Out of print for many years, Simmons' Arcade was reissued on compact disc in 2007 by specialty label Wounded Bird Records, which is also the home of Southern Pacific's and Tom Johnston's catalogs.

Post-Doobies, McDonald became established as a solo artist. His voice dominated adult contemporary radio throughout the 1980s, and he experienced a renaissance of popularity in the 21st century as an interpreter of Motown classics.

The reformation of the Doobie Brothers was not intentional. On a personal quest for a worthy cause and after conquering his drug addiction, Knudsen became active in the Vietnam Veterans Aid Foundation. In early 1987, he persuaded 11 Doobie alumni to join him for a concert to benefit veterans' causes. Answering the call were Tom Johnston, Pat Simmons, Jeff Baxter, John McFee, John Hartman, Michael Hossack, Chet McCracken, Michael McDonald, Cornelius Bumpus, Bobby LaKind and Tiran Porter, plus their long-time record producer and good friend, Ted Templeman. There were no surplus bass players as Weeks had other commitments. They soon discovered that tickets were in great demand, so the concert quickly evolved into a 12-city tour that began on May 21, 1987, in San Diego. The third concert, held at the Hollywood Bowl, was reportedly the venue's fastest sell-out since the Beatles had played there just over 20 years earlier. The band performed selections from every album using a wide variety of instrumentation that they could not have previously duplicated onstage without the expanded lineup. Baxter and McFee played pedal steel and violin, respectively, during "Black Water" and "Steamer Lane Breakdown". "Without You" featured four drummers and four lead guitarists. Producer Ted Templeman played percussion and LaKind sometimes played Knudsen's drum set while Knudsen went to the front of the stage to join the chorus. Templeman also played the drum set on "What a Fool Believes", as he did on the original hit record. The tour culminated (sans McDonald, LaKind, McFee and Knudsen) at the Glasnost-inspired July 4 "Peace Concert" in Moscow, with Bonnie Raitt, James Taylor and Santana sharing the bill. Excerpts appearing later that year on the Showtime cable network included a performance of "China Grove".

The successful 1987 reunion sparked discussions about reconstituting the band on a permanent basis. They eventually decided to replicate the Toulouse Street/The Captain and Me incarnation, settling on a lineup featuring Johnston, Simmons, Hartman, Porter and Hossack, plus more recent addition LaKind, and released Cycles on Capitol Records in 1989. The album featured a Top 10 single, "The Doctor". The song is very similar to "China Grove", and the connection was further enhanced by guest Bill Payne's tinkling piano. Other material on the album included Johnston's "South of the Border", Dale Ockerman's and Pat Simmons' "Take Me to the Highway", and "I Can Read Your Mind", a version of the Isley Brothers' "Need a Little Taste of Love", and a version of the Four Tops classic, "One Chain (Don't Make No Prison)", which had been covered by Santana years before. Cycles proved a successful comeback album and was certified Gold. Bumpus participated in the 1989 and 1990 tours, adding his distinctive voice, keyboards, saxophone and flute. His presence bridged the gap between the current band and the McDonald era; he sang lead vocals on "One Step Closer" (as he originally had on the 1980 album) while Simmons took McDonald's part. The group was further augmented on the 1989 tour by Dale Ockerman (keyboards, guitar, backing vocals), Richard Bryant (percussion, vocals) and Jimi Fox (percussion, backing vocals). After being diagnosed with terminal colon cancer, LaKind stepped down before the tour to focus on his health.

=== The 1990s ===
The success of Cycles led to the release of 1991's Brotherhood, also on Capitol. The group members grew their hair back out, wore denim and leather, and attempted to revive their biker image of the early 1970s. In spite of the makeover and strong material led by Simmons' now trademark "Dangerous" (featured in the Brian Bosworth biker film Stone Cold), Brotherhood was unsuccessful, in part due to a lack of support from Capitol Records, who dropped the group from their roster by the end of 1991.

The accompanying tour (the 1989 lineup minus Bumpus), which also featured Joe Walsh on the bill, ranked among the ten least profitable tours of the 1991 summer season by the North American Concert Promoters Association, and after losing the Capitol deal, the group was inactive by the end of '91, its future uncertain.

The 1987 Doobie Brothers alumni band reunited on October 17 and 19, 1992, at the Concord Pavilion in Concord, California to perform benefit shows for LaKind's children. LaKind, terminally ill with colon cancer, joined the group on percussion for a few numbers. The concerts were recorded and subsequently broadcast on the Superstars in Concert radio series accompanied by a plea for contributions to the LaKind family fund. LaKind died on December 24, 1992, at the age of 47.

Another brief hiatus followed during which Simmons collaborated with bassist and songwriter John Cowan (ex-New Grass Revival), Rusty Young (of Poco) and Bill Lloyd (of Foster & Lloyd) on an unreleased project called Four Wheel Drive.

When the band emerged yet again in 1993, Hartman and Porter had retired from the road for good but Knudsen and McFee rejoined the Doobie Brothers on a full-time basis after Southern Pacific disbanded. Joined by Ockerman, Bumpus and Weeks, the group toured with Four Wheel Drive as the opening act. After Weeks left the tour to resume his session work, Cowan played bass for both bands. Bumpus also left to join the reunited Steely Dan, giving way to saxophonist, keyboardist and harmonica player Danny Hull. Former band member Chet McCracken temporarily filled in for an injured Hossack in July 1993. Their 1994 tour included co-headlining appearances with Foreigner.

With renewed energy in the mid-1990s, the band began to experiment with different arrangements of several tunes. They even pulled from McDonald's songbook from time to time, eventually restoring "Takin' it to the Streets" to the setlist with Simmons and new bass guitarist Skylark (who joined in 1995) substituting for McDonald on lead vocals.

==== Return to permanent touring ====
The band has toured continuously since 1993. In 1995 they reunited with McDonald for a co-headlining tour with the Steve Miller Band. The "Dreams Come True" tour featured all three primary songwriters and singers and reflected all phases of the band's career. Bumpus rejoined for the 1995 tour, with McCracken replacing the absent Knudsen and Bernie Chiaravalle sitting in for McFee.

On January 28, 1996, they performed during the Super Bowl XXX pre-game show at Sun Devil Stadium in Tempe, Arizona.

A 1996 live double album, Rockin' Down the Highway: The Wildlife Concert, featured McDonald on three of his signature tunes. McDonald was a reoccurring special guest with the group for benefits, private corporate shows and parties (such as the wedding reception of Liza Minnelli and David Gest, their former advance publicist), until returning as a permanent member in 2019.

In mid-1996, Ockerman was replaced by keyboardist Guy Allison (ex–Moody Blues and Air Supply). Saxophonist Marc Russo (ex-Yellowjackets) joined in early 1998, replacing Hull. In 1999 the band obtained an injunction preventing a tribute band featuring former members McCracken, Bumpus and Shogren from performing under any variation of the "Doobie Brothers" name.

=== The 2000s ===
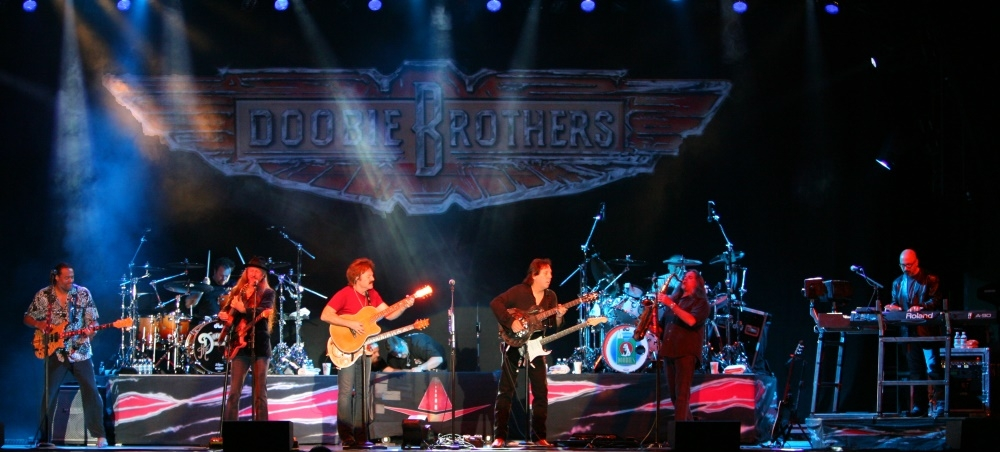
The Doobie Brothers in concert at the Chumash Casino Resort in Santa Ynez, California, on August 31, 2006

In 1999 Rhino Records released the group's first box set, Long Train Runnin': 1970–2000, which featured remastered tunes from the band's entire catalog, a new studio recording of the live concert staple "Little Bitty Pretty One" and an entire disc of previously unreleased studio outtakes and live recordings. And Rhino's release the following year, Sibling Rivalry, was the band's first new studio album since 1991. The material reflected contributions from both Knudsen and McFee, ranging from rock to hip-hop, jazz, adult contemporary and country. The album sold poorly, reflecting the declining sales throughout the adult-oriented rock musical scene.

On June 22, 2001, while heading to a show at Caesars Tahoe in Lake Tahoe, Hossack suffered multiple fractures in a motorcycle accident on Highway 88 and had to be airlifted to a Sacramento-area hospital, where he underwent surgery. Drummer and percussionist M. B. Gordy was recruited to fill in for Hossack. After being sidelined for months, Hossack returned to the band in mid-2002. Gordy remained with the band as an auxiliary percussionist until 2005. Saxophonist Ed Wynne filled in for Marc Russo on the Doobies' 2002 summer tour.

On October 26, 2004, the Doobie Brothers released Live at Wolf Trap, a live album recorded at Wolf Trap National Park for the Performing Arts in Vienna, Virginia on July 25 of that year. The album features the final recordings of drummer and vocalist Keith Knudsen, who died in February 2005. Ed Toth, from the band Vertical Horizon, took over for Knudsen.

=== The 2010s ===
For its 2010 and 2012 summer tours, the band was once again paired with Chicago, as it had been in 1974, 1999, and 2008.

In 2010, Skylark resigned from the band after suffering a stroke. John Cowan, who had originally toured with the band in the mid-1990s, returned to take Skylark's place, and has been with the band ever since. Three months later, before the band embarked on its 2010 summer tour with Chicago, Hossack was forced to sit out following a diagnosis of cancer. Tony Pia, a member of the Brian Setzer Orchestra, was recruited to substitute for Hossack. Pia became an official touring member of the band following Hossack's death in 2012.

The Doobie Brothers released their 13th studio album, World Gone Crazy, helmed by their longtime producer Ted Templeman, in 2010. World Gone Crazy was the first Doobie Brothers album Templeman produced since One Step Closer in 1980. The album's first single, "Nobody", was free-streamed on their website.

By 2012, five members of the Doobie Brothers family were deceased: percussionist/vocalist LaKind in 1992, original bass guitarist / vocalist Shogren in 1999; saxophonist, keyboardist, vocalist, and flutist Bumpus in 2004, while en route to California for a solo tour; drummer and vocalist Knudsen in 2005, and drummer Hossack in 2012.

The official documentary, Let the Music Play: The Story of the Doobie Brothers, was released in 2012. It features interviews and rare footage from their early days of the 1970s to the present day. Johnston, Simmons, McDonald, McFee, Porter, and Baxter, along with manager Bruce Cohn, producer Ted Templeman, and members of the Johnston and Simmons families are interviewed in the film.

In 2014 the Doobie Brothers, in conjunction with Sony Music Nashville, announced that their 14th studio album Southbound would cover their greatest hits with lead and backing vocals from several country artists, and Michael McDonald returned to collaborate on the album. Featured artists included Sara Evans, Vince Gill, Hunter Hayes, Casey James, Toby Keith, Love and Theft, Jerrod Niemann, Brad Paisley, Blake Shelton, Tyler Farr, Chris Young, Charlie Worsham, and the Zac Brown Band.

The Doobie Brothers, with Michael McDonald, were featured guests on the 47th Annual CMA Awards to celebrate the album, and were joined by Hunter Hayes, Jennifer Nettles, and Hillary Scott to perform "Listen to the Music", and then by co-host Brad Paisley for "Takin' It to the Streets" to close the show.

The Doobie Brothers performed at Music City Roots in 2015, sharing the stage with Béla Fleck and Dan Tyminski. This was the band's second performance at the venue, after an all-acoustic performance in 2011. The acoustic portion of the 2015 show featured songs that had not been heard by audiences in years, including the title track from Toulouse Street.

In 2015, keyboardist/backing vocalist Guy Allison went to Japan to work on an album project. Little Feat co-founder and pianist Bill Payne, known for his contributions to many of the band's early studio albums, was selected to temporarily fill in for Allison in his absence. The Doobies and Michael McDonald were the featured musical guests on The Tonight Show Starring Jimmy Fallon in 2015, where they performed a medley of "Long Train Runnin'" and "Takin' It to the Streets". The band also performed a web-exclusive performance of "What a Fool Believes" that was made available on The Tonight Show's website.

In October 2015 Payne officially took over Guy Allison's duties as the Doobies' keyboardist, whilst remaining an active member of Little Feat. The next month, the Doobie Brothers together with Journey launched a tour featuring Dave Mason. The pairing with Journey continued in 2016, beginning at the Irvine Meadows Amphitheatre and concluding when the Doobies and Journey joined the Steve Miller Band and Santana at AT&T Park. They also appeared at Warren Haynes Christmas Jam in 2015, however Johnston did not appear due to knee surgery.

In 2016 the Doobie Brothers signed under new management with Irving Azoff. Tony Pia left in the summer, leaving Ed Toth as the band's sole drummer.

In 2017 the Doobie Brothers toured with Chicago once again, beginning at the Concord Pavilion and wrapping up in Virginia Beach. They also appeared with the Eagles and Steely Dan at the Classic concerts for two weekends in 2017. These concerts took place at Dodger Stadium (Classic West) and at Citi Field (Classic East). The success of these concerts led to an appearance at the Classic Northwest concert at Safeco Field, opening again for the Eagles. The band took the last leg of their 2017 world tour to Europe, opening for Steely Dan.

They toured again with Steely Dan the following year. This tour began in Charlotte, North Carolina and concluded in Bethel, New York. Former Allman Brothers percussionist Marc Quiñones joined the band in May 2018, and the band performed the Toulouse Street and The Captain and Me albums in their entirety along with a selection of hits, at the Beacon Theatre in New York City on November 15–16, 2018. These shows marked their first time at the theatre in 25 years. The concerts were recorded and released as a live album in 2019.

During the summer of 2019, the band toured with Santana. Also in 2019, the band performed at the Ryman Auditorium in Nashville and performed the Toulouse Street and The Captain and Me albums in their entirety once again. Michael McDonald joined the band for an encore and they performed "Takin' It to the Streets". At the end of the concert, Simmons announced that McDonald would re-join the band for their 50th Anniversary tour.

Since the early 2000s, they have headlined and performed at many benefit concerts including former manager Cohn's B.R. Cohn Winery in Glen Ellen where they had also shared the stage with McDonald in 2006 and 2012. Cohn sold his winery in 2015 to set his primary focus on managing the band and the B.R Cohn Charity Fall Music Festival was relocated to the Sonoma Valley Field of Dreams. The festival was renamed the Sonoma Music Festival. The Doobie Brothers with McDonald, Chicago and Ringo Starr headlined the three-day event.

=== The 2020s ===
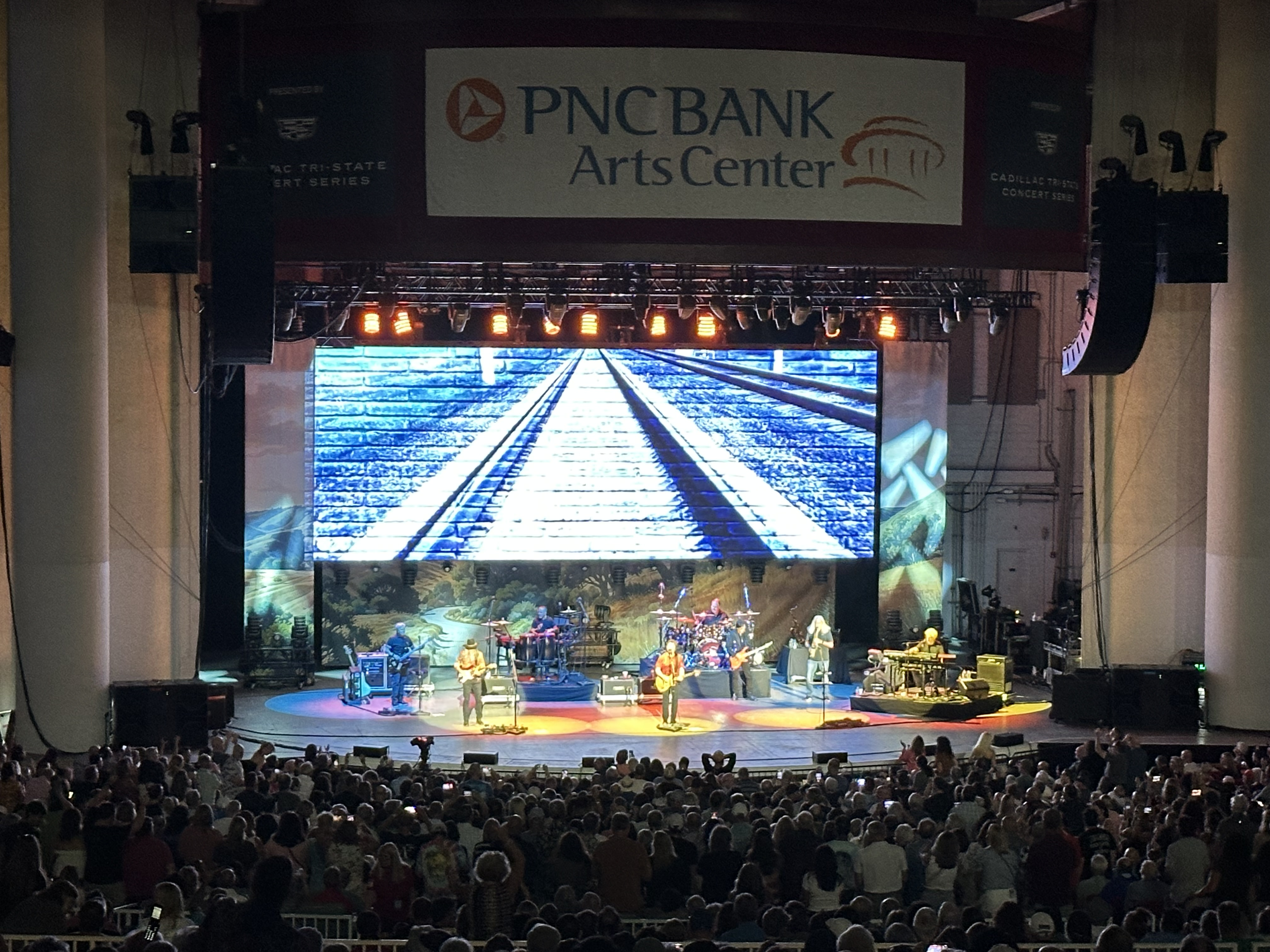
The Doobie Brothers performing in 2025

On January 15, 2020, it was announced that the Doobie Brothers were one of the six groups that would be inducted into the 2020 Rock and Roll Hall of Fame. The induction included living members Tom Johnston, Patrick Simmons, Michael McDonald, John McFee, Tiran Porter, John Hartman and Jeff Baxter, while Keith Knudsen and Michael Hossack would be inducted posthumously. The induction ceremony was originally scheduled to take place on May 2, 2020, in Cleveland, but was postponed to November 7 due to the COVID-19 pandemic. The November 7 induction ceremony was held virtually on HBO Max, with Johnston, McDonald, and Simmons pre-recording their induction speeches on behalf of the other band members who were inducted alongside them.

In February 2020, the Doobie Brothers had a scheduled residency at the Venetian in Las Vegas. The band was only three shows into their eight-day residency when they were forced to cancel the remaining five dates after it was mentioned that there was an illness in the band. It was later discovered that Johnston had an early version of COVID-19, the virus that would end up becoming designated as a pandemic just one month later.

On May 26, 2020, the Doobie Brothers officially announced that they had rescheduled their 50th Anniversary tour to 2021 as a result of the COVID-19 pandemic and confirmed that the line up of this tour would include McDonald for the first time in 25 years.

During their time in isolation throughout 2020, the Doobie Brothers released at-home performances of "Black Water", "Listen to the Music", and "Takin' it to the Streets". These performances can be found on their social media accounts, such as YouTube and Facebook. In addition, they collaborated with Dave Mason for a re-recording of the Joe Cocker-popularized Traffic song "Feelin' Alright" and Peter Frampton for a cover of Eric Clapton's "Let it Rain".

On August 6, 2021, the Doobie Brothers released the EP of four songs that would eventually be featured on their fifteenth studio album. These songs included Johnston's "Don't Ya Mess with Me" and "Oh Mexico" along with Simmons's "Better Days" and "Cannonball".

After just over 18 months of not being able to tour due to the COVID-19 pandemic, the band (with McDonald back in the fold) finally began their 50th Anniversary Tour at the Iowa State Fair on Sunday, August 22, 2021. The first leg of the tour concluded at the PPL Center in Allentown, Pennsylvania on October 29, 2021, and the second leg began in West Palm Beach, Florida on June 2, 2022. Bill Payne left the touring band at the end of the first leg, citing his desire to commit "100%" to Little Feat. He was not replaced, and the tour continued with McDonald returning to his original role of primary keyboardist.

The Doobie Brothers were featured musical guests on Jimmy Kimmel Live! on Thursday, September 23, 2021.

On October 29, 2021, the band released Liberté, their fifteenth full-length studio album and first album of original material in 11 years. All of the tracks on the album were co-written with John Shanks. Shanks is known for his work with Bon Jovi, Sheryl Crow, and Melissa Etheridge, to name a few.

Original drummer John Hartman died on December 29, 2021. The band posted a tribute to him on their website in September 2022. (Note: Due to the timing of the tribute being posted, many news articles mistakenly report that Hartman died in September 2022.)

In 2023, Johnston, McDonald, and Simmons (as the Doobie Brothers) were nominated for induction into the Songwriters Hall of Fame. In addition, a continuation of their 50th Anniversary tour was planned for the year.

The Doobies started their 2023 touring schedule in Australia and Japan in April before making their way to Hawaii and then returning to the continental U.S. in May. Three days before they were set to perform in Hollywood, Florida, the band released a statement that Tom Johnston would be undergoing surgery following severe back pain and would not be able to join the band on the upcoming leg of the 50th Anniversary Tour. Simmons, McDonald, and McFee continued the 2023 touring schedule in Johnston's absence. Lead vocals normally performed by Johnston were shared between Simmons, McDonald, and bassist John Cowan.

In June 2023, Simmons said in an interview that the band will be releasing new music the next year with McDonald.

The band opened for the Eagles on the latter's The Long Goodbye Tour in November 2023, replacing Steely Dan due to Donald Fagen's health issues.

On November 17, 2023, the Doobie Brothers released a new single entitled "Lahaina" to benefit the families and individuals affected by the 2023 Hawaii wildfires. The song, produced by John Shanks, features Mick Fleetwood on drums, Jake Shimabukuro on ukulele, and Henry Kapono on vocals.

In 2024 a fully healed Tom Johnston rejoined the Doobies, who continued on with their 50th Anniversary tour.

On June 6, 2025, the band released a new album titled Walk This Road. A UK arena and American amphitheater tour with Jimmy Buffett's Coral Reefer Band as the opening act took place that summer in support of the album.

In Summer 2026, the band toured with Santana for the Oneness Tour, followed by a second leg of the Walk This Road tour.

== Members ==
Current official members

- Patrick Simmons – guitars, banjo, recorder, vocals (1970–1982, 1987–1991, 1992, 1993–present)
- Tom Johnston – vocals, guitars, keyboards, harmonica (1970–1977, 1987–1991, 1992, 1993–present)
- Michael McDonald – vocals, keyboards, synthesizers (1975–1982, 1987, 1992, 1995–1996, 2019–present)
- John McFee – guitars, mandolin, banjo, violin, cello, pedal steel guitar, harmonica, vocals (1979–1982, 1987, 1993–present)

Current touring members

- John Cowan – bass, lead and backing vocals (1993–1995, 2010–present)
- Marc Russo – saxophones (1998–present)
- Ed Toth – drums, percussion (2005–present)
- Marc Quiñones – percussion, backing vocals (2018–present)

== Discography ==
- The Doobie Brothers (1971)
- Toulouse Street (1972)
- The Captain and Me (1973)
- What Were Once Vices Are Now Habits (1974)
- Stampede (1975)
- Takin' It to the Streets (1976)
- Livin' on the Fault Line (1977)
- Minute by Minute (1978)
- One Step Closer (1980)
- Cycles (1989)
- Brotherhood (1991)
- Sibling Rivalry (2000)
- World Gone Crazy (2010)
- Southbound (2014)
- Liberté (2021)
- Walk This Road (2025)

== See also ==
- Eikichi Yazawa, Japanese rock musician who has hired most of the Doobie Brothers as his back-up band
