= Patrick Simmons =

American musician (born 1948)

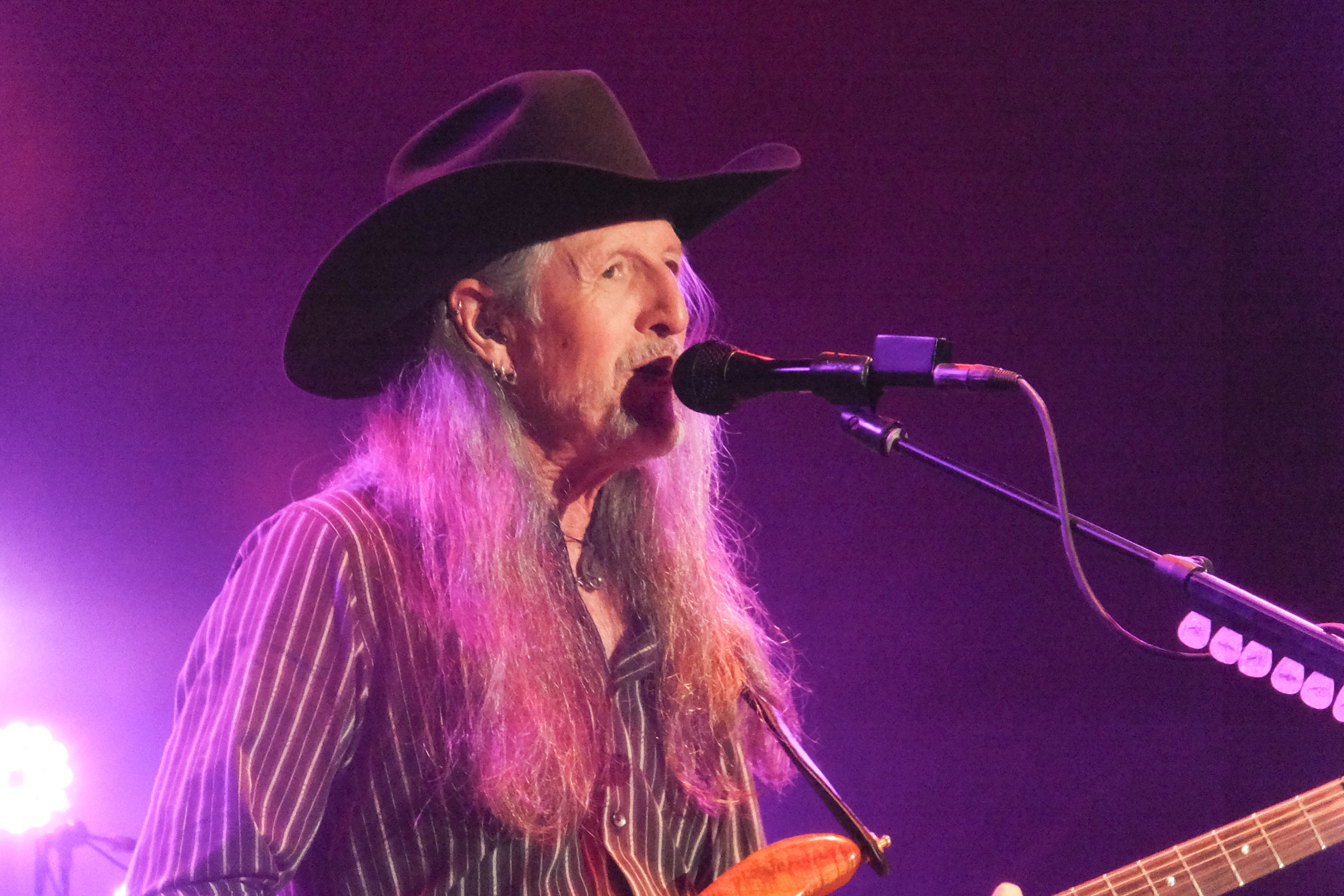
- Simmons performing with the Doobie Brothers in 2013

Background information
- Born: October 19, 1948 (age 77); Aberdeen, Washington, U.S.
- Origin: San Jose, California, U.S.
- Genres: Rock; pop
- Occupation: Musician
- Instruments: Vocals; guitar; banjo
- Years active: 1970–present
- Labels: Warner Bros.; Capitol; Elektra
- Member of: The Doobie Brothers
- Formerly of: Skin Suit

Patrick Simmons (born October 19, 1948) is an American musician best known as a founding member of the rock band The Doobie Brothers, with whom he was inducted as into the Rock and Roll Hall of Fame in 2020. He is the only member of the band to appear on every release.

== Early life ==
Born in Aberdeen, Washington, Simmons was raised in San Jose, California, where his father was a high school educator. He attended Leigh High School in San Jose, California, followed by San José State University where he was a member of the Theta Xi fraternity and lived for many years in Santa Cruz County, California.

== Career ==
=== The Doobie Brothers ===
In 1970, a California-based power trio consisting of Tom Johnston, Dave Shogren and John Hartman teamed up with Simmons to form a group together. They would call themselves "The Doobie Brothers", after their friend Keith "Dyno" Rosen, who either lived with or next to the band, told them: "Why don't you call yourself the Doobie Brothers because you're always smoking pot?"

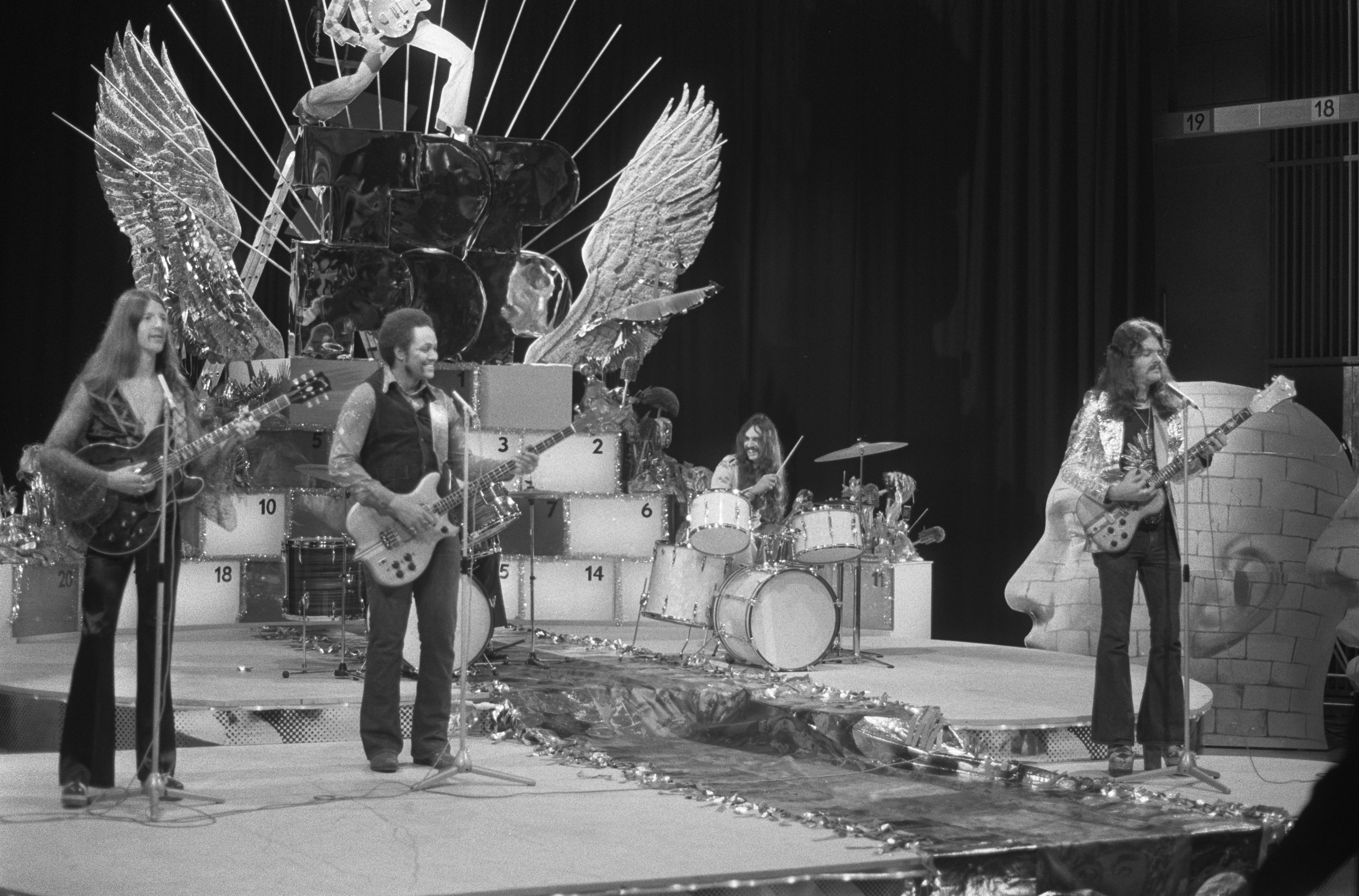
Simmons (far left) and the Doobie Brothers performing on the television show "TopPop" in 1974.

Simmons wrote and sang many songs for the Doobie Brothers, including lead vocal on "South City Midnight Lady", as well as "Dependin' On You", "Echoes of Love", "Wheels of Fortune" and "Black Water", the group's first #1 record.

The group's 1978 studio album, Minute by Minute, reached number one for five weeks, and won the band a Grammy for Best Pop Vocal Performance by a Duo or Group, while the single "What A Fool Believes" from the album won three Grammys itself.

The Doobie Brothers disbanded in 1982, with Simmons' decision to leave the group, as the last original member at the time, after Dave Shogren left in 1971, Tom Johnston in 1977, and John Hartman in 1979. The Doobie Brothers reformed again in 1987, and the band are still touring, as of 2024, being led by Simmons and Johnston.

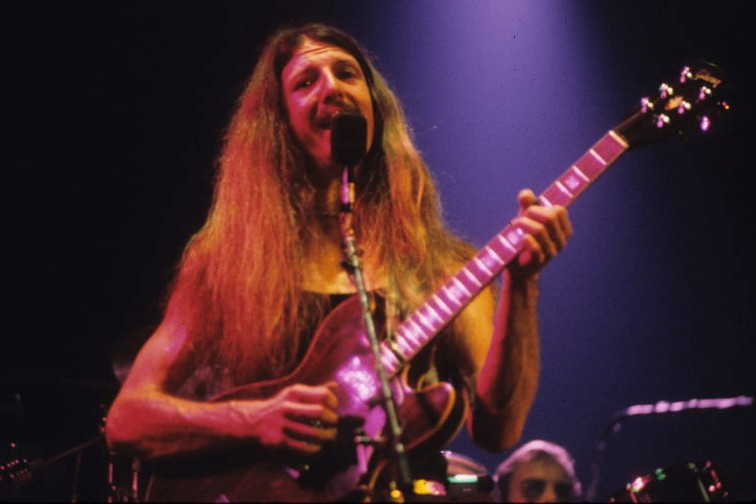
Simmons with The Doobie Brothers in 2006

The group has sold more than 40 million albums worldwide. The Doobie Brothers were inducted into the Vocal Group Hall of Fame in 2004, and the Rock and Roll Hall of Fame on November 7, 2020. Upon hearing that the band were to be inducted into the Rock and Roll Hall of Fame, Simmons recalled:

I was really happy about it. It's something that we've been thinking about for a long time. That's kind of one of the things you always hope will happen, especially with a band like ours that has been around this long. We're celebrating 50 years. It might even be 51, but who is counting?

In June 2025, Simmons, Johnston and Michael McDonald were inducted into the Songwriters Hall of Fame as members of The Doobie Brothers, the ceremony was hosted by Garth Brooks.

=== Solo ===
In 1983, Simmons released his debut solo album, Arcade, on Elektra Records. It yielded his only top 40 hit, "So Wrong", which peaked at #30 on the Billboard Hot 100. "So Wrong" was also a surprise hit on the US dance/disco chart, peaking at #8. The album was reissued on compact disc in Japan in the early 1990s and again in 2007, by the label Wounded Bird Records.

Simmons also formed the band Skin Suit during this period. In 1998, Simmons released a second solo album titled Take Me to the Highway.

With Tom Johnston, Simmons wrote Long Train Runnin': Our Story of The Doobie Brothers (2022).

== Personal life ==
He met his wife Cristine Sommer in 1989 in Sturgis, South Dakota at the Sturgis Motorcycle Rally. They moved to Mendocino County, California in 1990 after the Loma Prieta earthquake of 1989 and now live in Maui, Hawaii. They have three children and three grandchildren. One of their children, Patrick Simmons Jr. (born 1990), is an Island musician who still lives in Hawaii and has survived cancer. Simmons has stated previously that he is a Democrat.

In 1981 he opened a vintage motorcycle shop with author William J. Craddock.

Simmons and his wife are both avid cyclists and members of Antique Motorcycle Club of America. They both enjoy riding antique motorcycles, participating in the 2014 Motorcycle Cannonball Endurance Ride. They participated in the 2016 Motorcycle Cannonball, riding from Atlantic City, New Jersey to San Diego, California.

== Songs written by Simmons ==
Apart from "I Got You" and "So Wrong", these songs were all written for The Doobie Brothers.

- "Evil Woman" – 1973
- "South City Midnight Lady" – 1973
- "Black Water" – 1974
- "You Just Can't Stop It" – 1974
- "I Cheat the Hangman" – 1975
- "Sweet Maxine" – 1975
- "Wheels of Fortune" – 1976
- "Echoes of Love" – 1977
- "Dependin' on You" – 1979
- "So Wrong" – Patrick Simmons – 1983
- "Dangerous" – 1991
- "I Got You" – Train – 2009
- "Far From Home" – 2011

== Discography ==
=== With The Doobie Brothers ===
- The Doobie Brothers (1971)
- Toulouse Street (1972)
- The Captain and Me (1973)
- What Were Once Vices Are Now Habits (1974)
- Stampede (1975)
- Takin' It to the Streets (1976)
- Livin' on the Fault Line (1977)
- Minute by Minute (1978)
- One Step Closer (1980)
- Cycles (1989)
- Brotherhood (1991)
- Sibling Rivalry (2000)
- World Gone Crazy (2010)
- Southbound (2014)
- Liberté (2021)

=== Solo ===
==== Albums ====
| Year | Label | Album | US |
|---|---|---|---|
| 1983 | Elektra Records | Arcade | 52 |
| 1995 | | Take Me to the Highway | - |

=== Solo singles ===
| Year | Label | A-side | B-side | US | NLD |
|---|---|---|---|---|---|
| 1983 | Elektra Records | "So Wrong" | "If You Want A Little Love" | 30 | 49 |
| 1983 | Elektra Records | "Don't Make Me Do It" | "Sue Sad" | 75 | - |

=== Other ===
- Another Passenger – Carly Simon – Performer – 1976
- Time Loves a Hero – Little Feat – Peformer – 1977
- Energy – The Pointer Sisters – Composer – 1978
- Nicolette – Nicolette Larson – Performer – 1978
- Waiting for Columbus – Little Feat – Performer – 1978
- Lauren Wood – Lauren Wood – Performer – 1979
- Victim of Love –Elton John – Performer – 1979
- Whistling in the Dark – Max Carl – Performer – 1979
- In Harmony – Sesame Street – Performer – 1980
- Radioland – Nicolette Larson – Performer – 1980
- Steel Feels Good – Tom Johnston – Performer – 1981
- Industry Standard – The Dregs – Performer – 1982
- One More Mile – Jim Messina – Composer – 1983
- The Jitters – The Jitters – Composer – 1987
- Lambada: Erotic Dance Explosion – Concord – Composer – 1989
- Live or Else – The Necros – Composer – 1989
- Tres Palabras – Larry Vuckovich – Composer – 1989
- Let's Swamp Awhile – Smokehouse – Composer – 1991
- Rain Tree Crow – Rain Tree Crow – Composer – 1991
- Peaceful Easy Feeling – Mark Burchfield – Composer – 1993
- Bermuda Triangle – Al Yankee – Assistant engineer – 1995
- Valley Style – Kaʻau Crater Boys – Composer – 1995
- Piano Dreams – Robert LeClair – Composer – 1998
- Live at the Britt Festival – Michael Nesmith – Composer – 1999
- From Out of the Blue – The Sky Kings – Performer/Composer – 2000
- Warsaw Jazz Jamboree – Stéphane Grappelli – Composer – 2000
- Gioia2 – Lives of a Cell – Composer – 2002
- Cant Stop Running – Todd Rundgren – Composer – 2002
- Cooling the Mark – General Rudie – Composer – 2003
- Live from New York to Tokyo – Ray Brown – Composer – 2003
- Sacred – Los Lonely Boys – Composer – 2006
- Baby Goes Southern Rock – Baby Goes – Composer – 2007
- Dregs – Dixie Dregs – Guest artist – 2007
- Pure Imagination – Cathy Kreger – Composer – 2007
- Love Games – Dynamics – Composer – 2008
- Save Me, San Francisco – Train – Composer – 2009
- Simple Truth – Gail Swanson – Guest artist – 2009
- Subways – The Avalanches – Composer – 2016
- Wildflower – The Avalanches – Composer – 2016
- Oh, Vita! – Jovanotti – Composer – 2017
