= List of Steely Dan members =

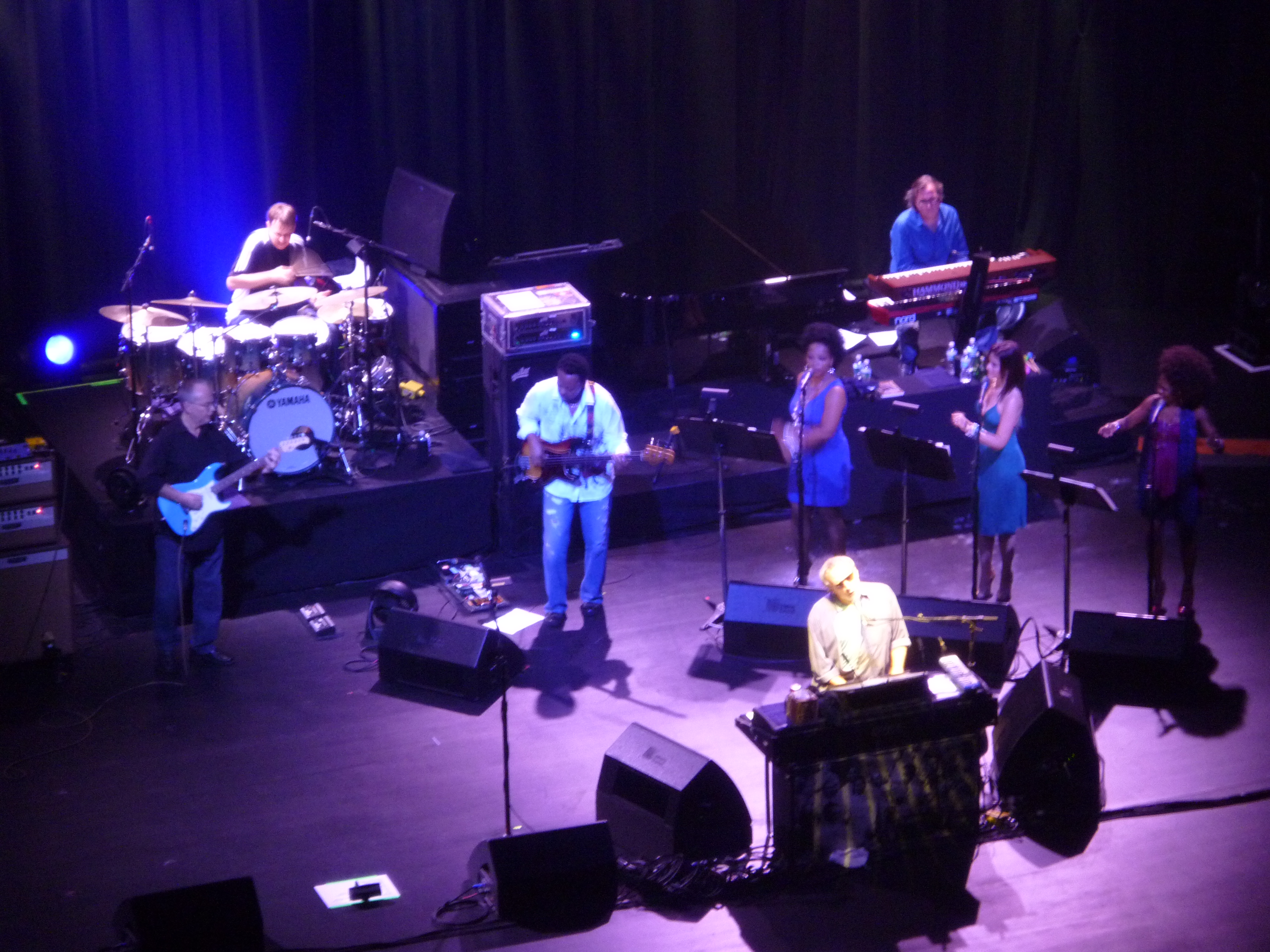
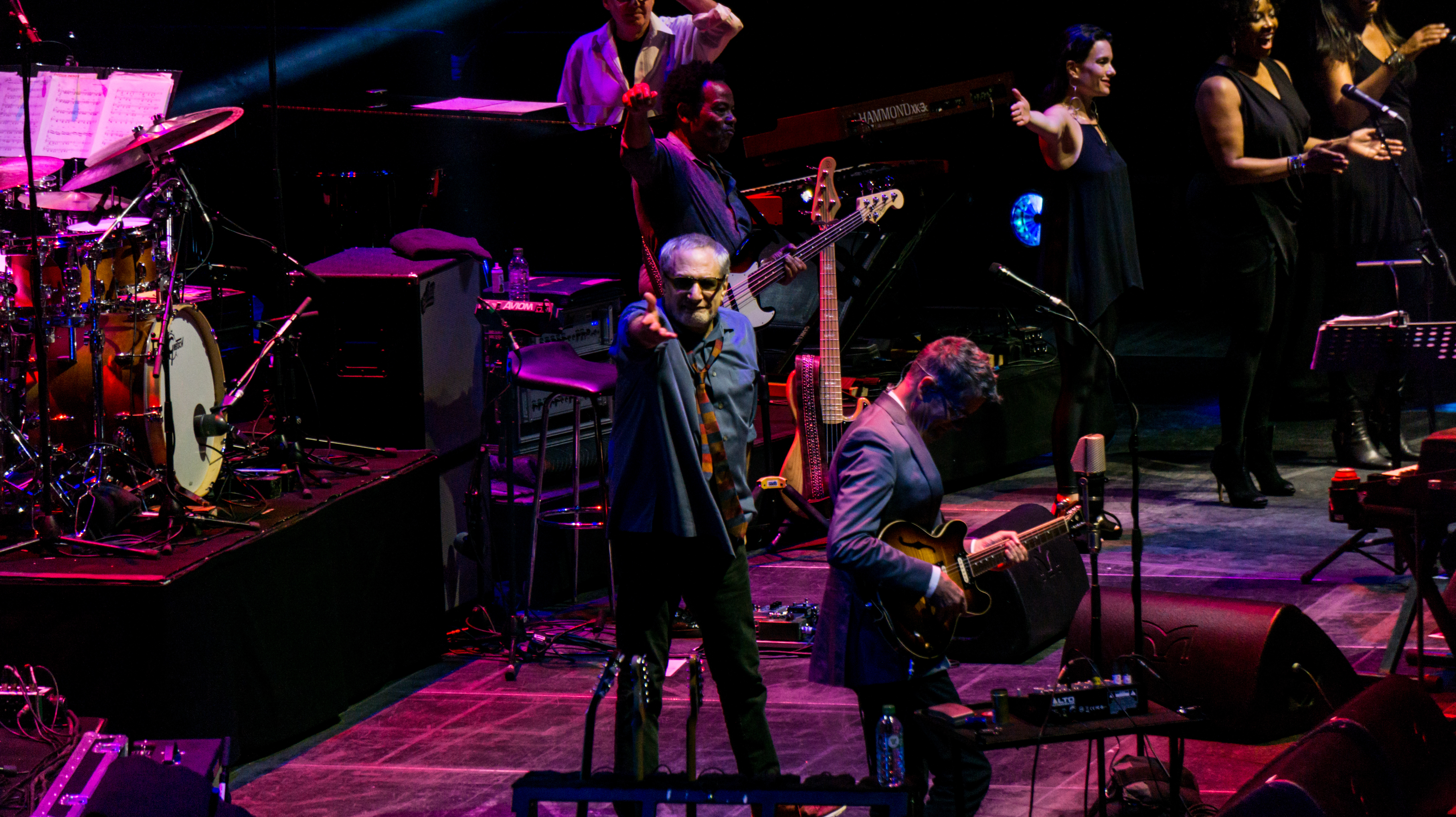
Steely Dan performing in 2009 and 2017

Steely Dan was an American jazz rock group founded by Walter Becker (guitars, bass, backing vocals) and Donald Fagen (keyboards, lead vocals). Their first lineup also included guitarists Denny Dias and Jeff "Skunk" Baxter and drummer Jim Hodder. Other early members included singers David Palmer, Royce Jones, and Michael McDonald, and drummer Jeff Porcaro. The final lineup consisted of Fagen – the sole consistent member since Becker's death in 2017 – alongside touring members including backing vocalists Catherine Russell (who first joined in 1993) and Carolyn Leonhart, trumpeter Michael Leonhart (both since 1996), guitarist Jon Herington (from 1999), trombonist Jim Pugh (from 2000), saxophonists Roger Rosenberg (from 2000) and Walt Weiskopf (from 2002), drummer Keith Carlock (from 2003), bassist Freddie Washington (from 2006), backing vocalist La Tanya Hall (from 2014), and guitarist Adam Rogers (from 2022). The band would continue until 2024; they were effectively brought to an end with Fagen's retirement in 2026.

== History ==
=== 1971–1993 ===
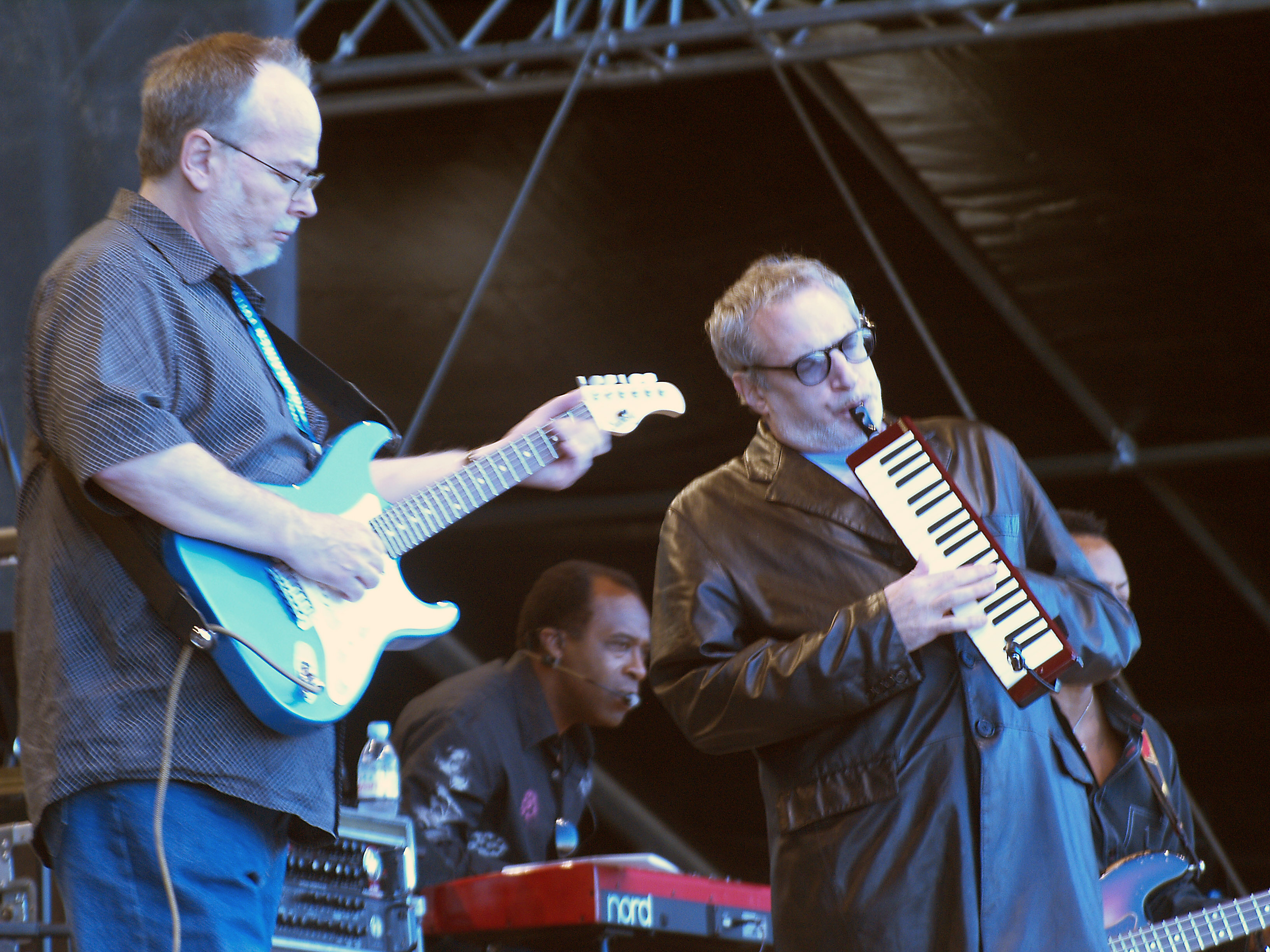
Walter Becker and Donald Fagen formed Steely Dan in 1972 with guitarist Denny Dias.

Walter Becker and Donald Fagen met in 1967 at Bard College, in Annandale-on-Hudson, New York. As Fagen passed the Red Balloon café, he heard Becker practicing the electric guitar. Fagen later recounted that "it sounded very professional and contemporary. It sounded like, you know, like a black person, really." Discovering that they enjoyed similar music, the two began writing songs together in a band known as the Leather Canary, which featured Chevy Chase on drums.

Becker and Fagen met guitarist Denny Dias in 1970 when he placed an ad in The Village Voice that read: "Looking for keyboardist and bassist. Must have jazz chops! Assholes need not apply". The pair also met guitarist Jeff "Skunk" Baxter, with whom they performed on the album I Mean to Shine by singer Linda Hoover.

The pair relocated from New York City to Los Angeles in 1972 to become staff composers for ABC Records. At producer Gary Katz's suggestion, they soon formed their own band to perform their complex songs. The lineup included guitarists Dias and Baxter, Fagen playing keyboards, Becker on bass, and drummer Jim Hodder, whom Baxter knew from Boston. David Palmer joined as a second lead vocalist because of Fagen's occasional stage fright, reluctance to sing in front of an audience, and the label's concern that Fagen's voice was not "commercial" enough. This lineup recorded Steely Dan's debut, Can't Buy a Thrill.

Palmer left in 1973, around the time of their second album, Countdown to Ecstasy. Subsequent touring lineups included vocalist and percussionist Royce Jones, keyboardist and vocalist Michael McDonald, and drummer Jeff Porcaro.

Beginning with Pretzel Logic in 1974, the band increasingly employed studio musicians on recordings. A rift grew among members, as Becker and Fagen disliked constant touring and wanted to concentrate solely on writing and recording while the other members wanted to tour. Steely Dan's last live performance of the 1970s was on July 5, 1974, at the Santa Monica Civic Auditorium in California, after which Becker and Fagen opted to focus on recording albums. Discouraged by the decision to cease touring and by their diminishing studio roles, Baxter, Hodder, and Jones departed. Dias contributed to studio recordings through Aja in 1977, and McDonald and Porcaro through Gaucho in 1980. Baxter and McDonald later joined The Doobie Brothers.

Steely Dan disbanded in June 1981. Becker moved to Maui, where he became an "avocado rancher and self-styled critic of the contemporary scene." He stopped using drugs, which he had used for most of his career. Meanwhile, Fagen released a solo album, The Nightfly (1982), which went platinum in both the U.S. and the UK and yielded the Top-20 hit "I.G.Y. (What a Beautiful World)".

=== 1993–2026 ===
Becker and Fagen reunited for an American tour to support Fagen's album Kamakiriad, which sold poorly despite a Grammy nomination for Album of the Year. An album of the tour, called Alive in America, was recorded at various dates between August 19, 1993 and September 19, 1994. Personnel included pianist Warren Bernhardt, guitarists Georg Wadenius and Drew Zingg, bassist Tom Barney, saxophonists Cornelius Bumpus, Chris Potter and Bob Sheppard, percussionist/vibraphonist Bill Ware, backing vocalists Catherine Russell, Diane Garisto and Brenda White-King, and drummers Dennis Chambers (1994 dates) and Peter Erskine (1993 dates). The duo continued to tour in 1996 with some shows in 1995. Tour personnel included Tom Barney (bass), John Beasley (piano and keyboards), Ricky Lawson (drums), Wayne Krantz (guitar), Cornelius Bumpus (saxophone), Michael Leonhart (trumpet), Ari Ambrose (saxophone), Michelle Wiley (backing vocals) and Carolyn Leonhart (backing vocals). After this activity, Becker and Fagen returned to the studio to begin work on a new album.

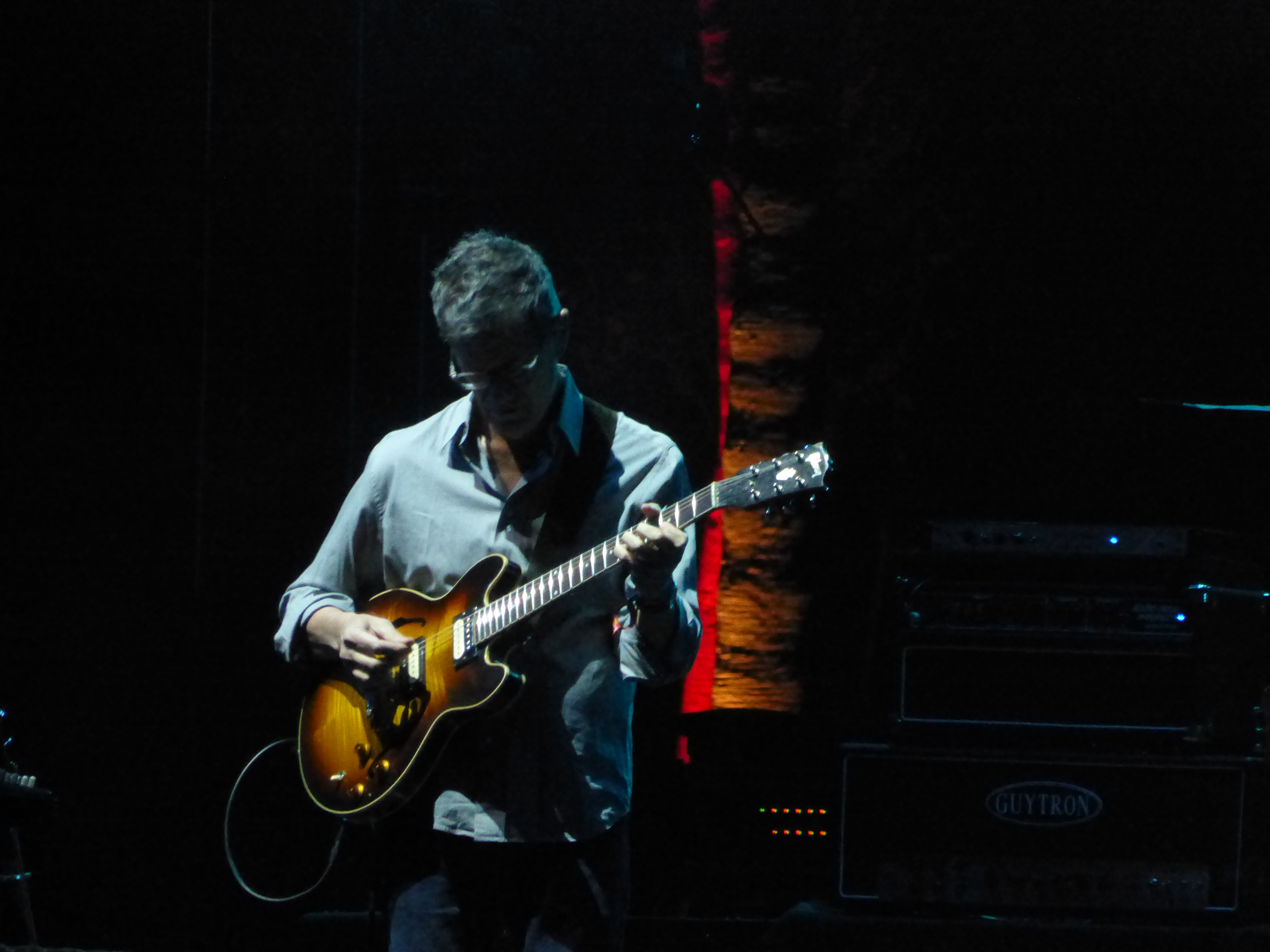
Jon Herington started performing with the band in 1999 and became a staple of their live sound.

In 2000, Steely Dan released their first studio album in 20 years: Two Against Nature. In the summer of 2000, they began another American tour, followed by an international tour later that year. The tour featured guitarist Jon Herington, who would go on to play with the band over the next two decades. Other musicians included saxophonists Ari Ambrose, Bob Sheppard, Chris Potter and Cornelius Bumpus, vocalists Carolyn Leonhart, Cynthia Calhoun and Victoria Cave, trombonist Jim Pugh, trumpeter Michael Leonhart, bassist Tom Barney, drummer Ricky Lawson and keyboardist Ted Baker. In June 2000 the band released Plush TV Jazz-Rock Party which documents a recording of a PBS In the Spotlight show recorded in January 2000, personnel included Ted Baker (piano), Jon Herington (guitar), Tom Barney (bass), Cornelius Bumpus and Chris Potter (saxophone), Michael Leonhart (trumpet), Jim Pugh (trombone), Ricky Lawson (drums) and Carolyn Leonhart, Cynthia Calhoun and Victoria Cave (vocals). In March 2001, Steely Dan was inducted into the Rock and Roll Hall of Fame.

In 2003, Steely Dan released Everything Must Go. In contrast to their earlier work, they had tried to write music that captured a live feel. Becker sang lead vocals on a Steely Dan studio album for the first time ("Slang of Ages" — he had sung lead on his own "Book of Liars" on Alive in America). Fewer session musicians played on Everything Must Go than had become typical of Steely Dan albums: Becker played bass on every track and lead guitar on five tracks; Fagen added piano, electric piano, organ, synthesizers, and percussion on top of his vocals; touring drummer Keith Carlock played on every track, the album also included touring members Ted Baker (keys), Jon Herington (guitar), Chris Potter (saxophone), Michael Leonhart (trumpet), Jim Pugh (trombone), Carolyn Leonhart, Cindy Mizelle and Catherine Russell (backing vocals). The tour for this album included Carolyn Leonhart, Cindy Mizelle and Cynthia Calhoun (vocals), Cornelius Bumpus (saxophone), Jim Pugh (trombone), Jon Herington (guitar), Keith Carlock (drums), Michael Leonhart (trumpet), Ted Baker (keyboards), Tom Barney (bass) and Walt Weiskopf (saxophone).

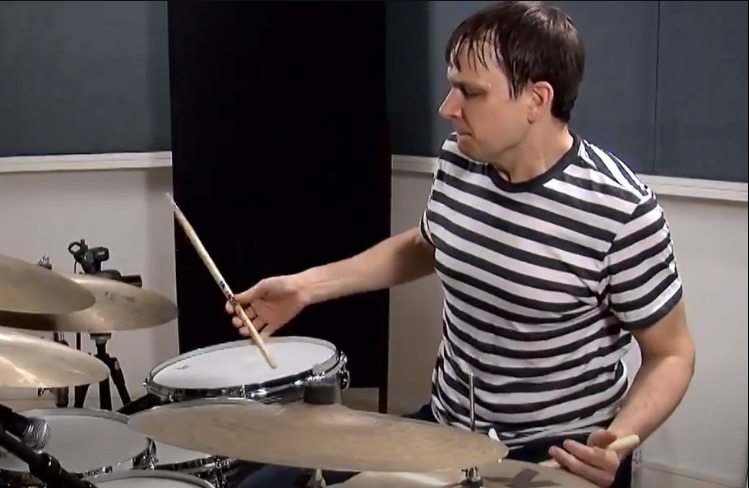
Keith Carlock was the band's touring drummer from 2003 to 2026, and the band's longest tenured drummer in any capacity.

To complete his Nightfly trilogy, Fagen issued Morph the Cat in 2006, in that same year the band toured with former member Michael McDonald. The tour band included Jon Herington (guitar), Freddie Washington (bass), Keith Carlock (drums), Jeff Young (keyboards and backing vocals), Walt Weiskopf (saxophone), Michael Leonhart (trumpet), Jim Pugh (trombone), Roger Rosenberg (baritone sax), Carolyn Leonhart and Cindy Mizelle (backing vocals). The tour continued in 2007 as the Heavy Rollers tour with the same personnel, and into 2008, as the Think Fast tour, with the addition of Nelson Foltz on trumpet and Tawatha Agee on vocals. That year Becker released a second album, Circus Money.

The Rent Party tour started in June 2009 and featured Carolyn Leonhart, Catherine Russel and Tawatha Agee (vocals), Freddie Washington (bass), Jim Beard (keyboards), Jim Pugh (trombone), Jon Herrington (guitar), Keith Carlock (drums), Michael Leohart (trumpet), Roger Rosenberg and Walt Weiskopf (saxophone). In the same month the Left Bank Holiday tour also started and continued into July touring Europe, the tour included the same personnel as the Rent Party which started again later in July 2009 and concluded in November.

In July 2011, the Shuffle Diplomacy Tour started and included musicians Keith Carlock (drums); Jon Herington (guitar); Freddie Washington (bass); Jim Beard (keys); Michael Leonhart, Walt Weiskopf, Roger Rosenberg and Jim Pugh (horns); plus background singers Carolyn Leonhart, Cindy Mizelle, and Catherine Russell. The Mood Swings: 8 Miles to Pancake Day Tour began in July 2013 and featured an eight-night run at the Beacon Theatre in New York City. Musicians included Carolyn Leonhart, Catherine Russell and La Tanya Hall (vocals), Freddie Washington (bass), Jim Pugh (trombone), Keith Carlock (drums), Michael Leonhart (trumpet and Roger Rosenberg and Walt Weiskopf (saxophone).

Jamalot Ever After, their 2014 United States tour, ran from July 2 in Portland, Oregon to September 20 in Port Chester, New York. Its band included Keith Carlock on drums, Freddie Washington on bass, Jim Beard on keyboards, Jon Herington on guitar, Michael Leonhart on trumpet and keys, Jim Pugh on trombone, Roger Rosenberg on baritone saxophone, Walt Weiskopf on saxophone and vocalists La Tanya Hall, Carolyn Leonhart, and Cindy Mizelle. 2015's Rockabye Gollie Angel Tour included opening act Elvis Costello and the Imposters and dates at the Coachella Valley Music and Arts Festival, it featured the same band as previous tours. The Dan Who Knew Too Much tour followed in 2016, with Steve Winwood opening. Steely Dan also performed at The Hollywood Bowl in Los Angeles with an accompanying orchestra, the tour band was the same.

Becker died from complications of esophageal cancer on September 3, 2017. In a note released to the media, Fagen remembered his longtime friend and bandmate, and promised to "keep the music we created together alive as long as I can with the Steely Dan band." After Becker's death, Steely Dan honored commitments to perform a short North American tour in October 2017 and three concert dates in the United Kingdom and Ireland for Bluesfest on a double bill with the Doobie Brothers. The band played its first concert following Becker's death in Thackerville, Oklahoma, on October 13. In tribute to Becker, they performed his solo song "Book of Liars", with Fagen singing the lead vocals, at several concerts on the tour. The backing band was retained.

In 2018, Steely Dan performed on a summer tour of the United States with The Doobie Brothers as co-headliners. The band also played a nine-show residency at the Beacon Theatre in New York City that October. the band included Jim Beard (keys), Freddie Washington (bass), Jon Herrington (guitar), and Keith Carlock (drums). In February 2019, the band embarked on a tour of Great Britain with Steve Winwood, the included Ari Ambrose, Roger Rosenberg and Walt Weiskopf (saxophone), Carolyn Leonhart, Catherine Russell, Jamie Leonhart, La Tanya Hall and Nicki Richards (vocals), Connor Kennedy of The Nightflyers (guitar, vocals), Freddie Washington (bass), Jim Beard (keys), Jim Pugh (trombone), Jon Herrington (guitar, electric sitar) and Keith Carlock (drums).

In July 2023, the Eagles announced Steely Dan would be the special guest of their The Long Farewell tour running from September to November 2023.

On March 2, 2024, long-time touring keyboardist Jim Beard died.

Steely Dan was retired in April, 2026.

== Official members ==
Image	Name	Years active	Instruments	Release contributions
	Donald Fagen	1972–1981; 1993–2024	lead vocals; keyboards	all releases
	Walter Becker	1972–1981; 1993–2017 (until his death)	guitar; bass; backing and occasional lead vocals	all releases
	Denny Dias	1972–1974 (studio contributions until 1977; guest 1993, 2015)	guitar; backing vocals	Can't Buy a Thrill (1972); Countdown to Ecstasy (1973); Pretzel Logic (1974); Katy Lied (1975); The Royal Scam (1976); Aja (1977)
	Jeff "Skunk" Baxter	1972–1974	guitar; backing vocals	Can't Buy a Thrill (1972); Countdown to Ecstasy (1973); Pretzel Logic (1974)
	Jim Hodder	1972–1974 (died 1990)	drums; backing and lead vocals	Can't Buy a Thrill (1972); Countdown to Ecstasy (1973); Pretzel Logic (1974) one track
	David Palmer	1972–1973	backing and lead vocals	Can't Buy a Thrill (1972); Countdown to Ecstasy (1973)
	Royce Jones	1973–1974	backing vocals; percussion	Countdown to Ecstasy (1973)
	Michael McDonald	1974 (studio contributions until 1980; opener & guest on 2006 tour)	keyboards; backing vocals	Katy Lied (1975); The Royal Scam (1976); Aja (1977); Gaucho (1980)
	Jeff Porcaro	1974 (studio contributions in 1974 and 1980) (died 1992) (Note: While some sources state that Porcaro replaced Hodder, others show that the two performed alongside each other.)	drums	Pretzel Logic (1974); Katy Lied (1975); Gaucho (1980)

== Touring members ==
=== Final touring members ===
Image	Name	Years active	Instruments	Release contributions
	Catherine Russell	1993–1996; 2008–2013; 2018–2024	backing vocals; percussion	Alive in America (1995); Everything Must Go (2003)
	Bob Sheppard	1993–1995; 2000; 2024	soprano and tenor saxophone	Alive in America (1995)
	Carolyn Leonhart	1996–2024	backing vocals	Two Against Nature (2000); Plush TV Jazz-Rock Party (2000); Everything Must Go (2003)
	Michael Leonhart	1996–2024	trumpet; horn arrangements; keyboards	Two Against Nature (2000); Plush TV Jazz-Rock Party (2000); Everything Must Go (2003)
	Jon Herington	1999–2024	guitar; backing vocals; musical director	Two Against Nature (2000); Plush TV Jazz-Rock Party (2000); Everything Must Go (2003)
	Jim Pugh	2000–2024	trombone	Two Against Nature (2000); Plush TV Jazz-Rock Party (2000); Everything Must Go (2003)
	Roger Rosenberg	2000–2024	baritone saxophone; bass clarinet	Two Against Nature (2000); Everything Must Go (2003)
	Keith Carlock	2003–2024	drums; percussion	Two Against Nature (2000); Everything Must Go (2003)
	Freddie Washington	2006–2024	bass	none
	La Tanya Hall	2014–2024	backing vocals	none
	Adam Rogers	2022–2024	guitar	none
	Larry Goldings	2024	keyboards	none

=== Former touring members ===
Image	Name	Years active	Instruments	Release contributions
	Gloria "Porky" Granola	1973–1974	backing vocals	none
	Jenny "Bucky" Soule	1973–1974	backing vocals	none
	Tom Barney	1993–2003	bass	Alive in America (1995); Two Against Nature (2000); Plush TV Jazz-Rock Party (2000)
	Cornelius Bumpus	1993–2003 (died 2004)	tenor saxophone	Alive in America (1995); Plush TV Jazz-Rock Party (2000)
	Chris Potter	1993–1995; 2000	alto and tenor saxophone	Alive in America (1995); Two Against Nature (2000); Plush TV Jazz-Rock Party (2000); Everything Must Go (2003)
	Bill Ware	1993–1995	vibraphone; percussion	Alive in America (1995)
	Diane Garisto	1993–1995	backing vocals	Alive in America (1995)
	Brenda White-King	1993–1995	backing vocals	Alive in America (1995)
	Warren Bernhardt	1993–1994 (died 2022)	piano; keyboards	Alive in America (1995)
	Drew Zingg	1993–1994; 1995; (died 2025)	guitar	Alive in America (1995)
	Georg Wadenius	1994 (died 2026)	guitar	Alive in America (1995)
	Peter Erskine	1993, 1995	drums	Alive in America (1995)
	Dennis Chambers	1994	drums	Alive in America (1995)
	Ari Ambrose	1996–2000; 2018	saxophone	none
	John Beasley	1995–1996	piano; keyboards	none
	Wayne Krantz	1996	guitar	none
	Michelle Wiley	1996	backing vocals	none
	Ricky Lawson	1996–2000 (died 2013)	drums	Two Against Nature (2000); Plush TV Jazz-Rock Party (2000)
	Ted Baker	2000–2003 (died 2023)	piano; keyboards	Two Against Nature (2000); Plush TV Jazz-Rock Party (2000); Everything Must Go (2003)
	Cynthia Calhoun	2000–2003	backing vocals	Plush TV Jazz-Rock Party (2000)
	Victoria Cave	2000	backing vocals	Plush TV Jazz-Rock Party (2000)
	Walt Weiskopf	2002–2024	tenor saxophone	Everything Must Go (2003)
	Cindy Mizelle	2003–2008; 2011–2016	backing vocals	Everything Must Go (2003)
	Jeff Young	2006–2008 (died 2023)	keyboards; backing vocals	none
	Jim Beard	2008–2024 (until his death)	keyboards	none
	Tawatha Agee	2008–2009	backing vocals	Everything Must Go (2003)
	Nelson Foltz	2008	trumpet	none
	Jamie Leonhart	2018–2019	backing vocals	none
	Nicki Richards	2018–2019	backing vocals	none
	Connor Kennedy	2018–2019	guitar; vocals	none

== Additional musicians ==
=== Session ===
Image	Name	Years active	Instruments	Release contributions
	Victor Feldman	1972–1980 (died 1987)	percussion; vibraphone; marimba; flapamba; keyboards; Fender Rhodes electric piano	all releases from Can't Buy a Thrill (1972) to Gaucho (1980)
	Jerome Richardson	1972; 1973–1974 (died 2000)	tenor saxophone	Can't Buy a Thrill (1972); Pretzel Logic (1974)
	Sherlie Matthews	1972–1973; 1974–1977	backing vocals	Can't Buy a Thrill (1972); Countdown to Ecstasy (1973); Katy Lied (1975); The Royal Scam (1976); Aja (1977)
	Myrna Matthews	1972–1973; 1974–1975	backing vocals	Can't Buy a Thrill (1972); Countdown to Ecstasy (1973); Katy Lied (1975)
	Clydie King	1972; 1975–1977 (died 2019)	backing vocals	Can't Buy a Thrill (1972); The Royal Scam (1976); Aja (1977)
	Venetta Fields	1972; 1975–1977	backing vocals	Can't Buy a Thrill (1972); The Royal Scam (1976); Aja (1977)
	Snooky Young	1972 (died 2011)	flugelhorn	Can't Buy a Thrill (1972)
	Chuck Rainey	1973–1980	bass	Pretzel Logic (1974); Katy Lied (1975); The Royal Scam (1976); Aja (1977); Gaucho (1980)
	Dean Parks	1973–1977	guitar; banjo	Pretzel Logic (1974); Katy Lied (1975); The Royal Scam (1976); Aja (1977)
	Michael Omartian	1973–1975; 1976–1977	piano; keyboards; rhythm arrangements	Pretzel Logic (1974); Katy Lied (1975); Aja (1977)
	David Paich	1973–1975	piano; keyboards	Pretzel Logic (1974); Katy Lied (1975)
	Wilton Felder	1973–1975 (died 2015)	bass	Pretzel Logic (1974); Katy Lied (1975)
	Plas Johnson	1973–1974; 1975–1977; (died 2026)	saxophone; flute	Pretzel Logic (1974); The Royal Scam (1976); Aja (1977)
	Timothy B. Schmit	1973–1974; 1975–1977	backing vocals	Pretzel Logic (1974); The Royal Scam (1976); Aja (1977)
	Ben Benay	1973–1974	acoustic guitar; guitar	Countdown to Ecstasy (1973); Pretzel Logic (1974)
	Ernie Watts	1973–1974	saxophone	Countdown to Ecstasy (1973); Pretzel Logic (1974)
	Lew McCreary	1973–1974	trombone	Countdown to Ecstasy (1973); Pretzel Logic (1974)
	Ollie Mitchell	1973–1974 (died 2013)	trumpet	Pretzel Logic (1974)
	Jim Gordon	1973–1974 (died 2023)	drums	Pretzel Logic (1974)
	Roger Nichols	1973–1974 (died 2011)	gong	Pretzel Logic (1974)
	Rick Derringer	1973; 1974–1975; 1978–1980; (died 2025)	slide guitar; guitar solo; guitar	Countdown to Ecstasy (1973); Katy Lied (1975); Gaucho (1980)
	Bill Perkins	1973; 1974–1975; 1976–1977 (died 2003)	saxophone	Countdown to Ecstasy (1973); Katy Lied (1975); Aja (1977)
	Patricia Hall	1973	backing vocals	Countdown to Ecstasy (1973)
	James Rolleston	1973	backing vocals	Countdown to Ecstasy (1973)
	Michael Fennelly	1973	backing vocals	Countdown to Ecstasy (1973)
	Lanny Morgan	1973	saxophone	Countdown to Ecstasy (1973)
	Johnny Rotella	1973 (died 2014)	saxophone	Countdown to Ecstasy (1973)
	Ray Brown	1973 (died 2002)	string bass	Countdown to Ecstasy (1973)
	Larry Carlton	1974–1980	guitar; rhythm arrangements	Katy Lied (1975); The Royal Scam (1976); Aja (1977); Gaucho (1980)
	Hugh McCracken	1974–1975; 1978–1980; 1997–1999; 2001–2003 (died 2013)	guitar	Katy Lied (1975); Gaucho (1980); Two Against Nature (2000); Everything Must Go (2003)
	Hal Blaine	1974–1975 (died 2019)	drums	Katy Lied (1975)
	Phil Woods	1974–1975 (died 2015)	alto saxophone	Katy Lied (1975)
	Jimmie Haskell	1974–1975 (died 2016)	horn arrangement	Katy Lied (1975)
	Don Grolnick	1975–1980 (died 1996)	keyboards; electric piano; Clavinet	The Royal Scam (1976); Aja (1977); Gaucho (1980)
	Paul Griffin	1975–1980 (died 2000)	keyboards; Fender Rhodes electric piano; backing vocals; rhythm arrangements	The Royal Scam (1976); Aja (1977); Gaucho (1980)
	Rick Marotta	1975–1980	drums	The Royal Scam (1976); Aja (1977); Gaucho (1980)
	Bernard Purdie	1975–1980	drums	The Royal Scam (1976); Aja (1977); Gaucho (1980)
	Chuck Findley	1975–1977	trumpet	The Royal Scam (1976); Aja (1977)
	Jim Horn	1975–1977	saxophone	The Royal Scam (1976); Aja (1977)
	Dick "Slyde" Hyde	1975–1977 (died 2019)	trombone	The Royal Scam (1976); Aja (1977)
	Gary Coleman	1975–1976	percussion	The Royal Scam (1976)
	Bob Findley	1975–1976	trumpet	The Royal Scam (1976)
	John Klemmer	1975–1976	saxophone	The Royal Scam (1976)
	Tom Scott	1976–1980	tenor saxophone; Lyricon; alto saxophone; clarinet	Aja (1977); Gaucho (1980)
	Steve Khan	1976–1980	guitars	Aja (1977); Gaucho (1980)
	Steve Gadd	1976–1980	drums; percussion	Aja (1977); Gaucho (1980)
	Joe Sample	1976–1980 (died 2014)	clavinet; electric piano	Aja (1977); Gaucho (1980)
	Wayne Shorter	1976–1977 (died 2023)	tenor saxophone	Aja (1977)
	Pete Christlieb	1976–1977	tenor saxophone; saxophone; flute	Aja (1977)
	Jackie Kelso	1976–1977 (died 2012)	saxophone; flute	Aja (1977)
	Rebecca Louis	1976–1977	backing vocals	Aja (1977)
	Lee Ritenour	1976–1977	guitars	Aja (1977)
	Jay Graydon	1976–1977	guitar solo	Aja (1977)
	Jim Keltner	1976–1977	drums; percussion	Aja (1977)
	Lou McCreary	1976–1977	brass	Aja (1977)
	Ed Greene	1976–1977	drums	Aja (1977)
	Paul Humphrey	1976–1977 (died 2014)	drums	Aja (1977)
	Dave Tofani	1978–1980; 1997–1999	tenor saxophone	Gaucho (1980); Two Against Nature (2000)
	Wayne Andre	1978–1980 (died 2003)	trombone	Gaucho (1980)
	Ronnie Cuber	1978–1980 (died 2022)	baritone saxophone	Gaucho (1980)
	Michael Brecker	1978–1980 (died 2007)	tenor saxophone	Gaucho (1980)
	David Sanborn	1978–1980 (died 2024)	alto saxophone	Gaucho (1980)
	George Marge	1978–1980	bass clarinets	Gaucho (1980)
	Walter Kane	1978–1980	bass clarinets	Gaucho (1980)
	Randy Brecker	1978–1980	trumpet; flugelhorn	Gaucho (1980)
	Lesley Miller	1978–1980	backing vocals	Gaucho (1980)
	Patti Austin	1978–1980	backing vocals	Gaucho (1980)
	Toni Wine	1978–1980	backing vocals	Gaucho (1980)
	Lani Groves	1978–1980	backing vocals	Gaucho (1980)
	Diva Gray	1978–1980 (died 2024)	backing vocals	Gaucho (1980)
	Gordon Grody	1978–1980	backing vocals	Gaucho (1980)
	Frank Floyd	1978–1980	backing vocals	Gaucho (1980)
	Zack Sanders	1978–1980	backing vocals	Gaucho (1980)
	Valerie Simpson	1978–1980	backing vocals	Gaucho (1980)
	Rob Mounsey	1978–1980	horn arrangement; piano	Gaucho (1980)
	Anthony Jackson	1978–1980 (died 2025)	bass guitar	Gaucho (1980)
	Hiram Bullock	1978–1980 (died 2008)	guitar	Gaucho (1980)
	Mark Knopfler	1978–1980	guitar solo	Gaucho (1980)
	Pat Rebillot	1978–1980	electric piano	Gaucho (1980)
	Nicholas Marrero	1978–1980	timbales	Gaucho (1980)
	Errol "Crusher" Bennett	1978–1980	percussion	Gaucho (1980)
	Ralph MacDonald	1978–1980 (died 2011)	percussion	Gaucho (1980)
	Gordon Gottlieb	1997–1999; 2001–2003	percussion	Two Against Nature (2000); Everything Must Go (2003)
	Michael Harvey	1997–1999; 2001–2003	backing vocals	Two Against Nature (2000); Everything Must Go (2003)
	Paul Jackson Jr.	1997–1999	guitar	Two Against Nature (2000)
	Leroy Clouden	1997–1999	drums	Two Against Nature (2000)
	Vinnie Colaiuta	1997–1999	drums	Two Against Nature (2000)
	Sonny Emory	1997–1999	drums	Two Against Nature (2000)
	Michael White	1997–1999	drums	Two Against Nature (2000)
	Daniel Sadownick	1997–1999	percussion; timbales	Two Against Nature (2000)
	Steve Shapiro	1997–1999	vibraphone	Two Against Nature (2000)
	Amy Helm	1997–1999	whistle	Two Against Nature (2000)
	Lawrence Feldman	1997–1999	clarinet; tenor saxophone; alto saxophone; saxophone	Two Against Nature (2000)
	Roy Hitchcock	1997–1999	clarinet	Two Against Nature (2000)
	Lou Marini	1997–1999	alto saxophone; tenor saxophone	Two Against Nature (2000)
	Will Lee	1997–1999	percussion	Two Against Nature (2000)
	Ada Dyer	2001–2003	backing vocals	Everything Must Go (2003)
	Ken Hitchcock	2001–2003	clarinet	Everything Must Go (2003)
	Tony Kadleck	2001–2003	trumpet	Everything Must Go (2003)

=== Guests ===
Image	Name	Years active	Instruments	Notes
	Boz Scaggs	1993	guitar	Scaggs made a guest appearance with the band on the song "Black Friday" on September 23, 1993.
	Brian May	2001	guitar	May played guitar on "Do It Again" with the band at their Rock and Roll Hall of Fame induction on March 19, 2001.
	Bill Charlap	2003	piano	Charlap made a guest appearance with the band at Jones Beach in 2003. He also played on two tracks on Everything Must Go (2003).
	Steve Winwood	2011; 2016; 2019	organ; vocals	Winwood guested with the band in 2011, 2016, and 2019.
	Elliot Randall	2009; 2019	lead guitar	Randall, who had played on albums Can't Buy a Thrill, Katy Lied and The Royal Scam, made guest appearances in 2009 and 2019.

== Line-ups ==
Period	Members	Releases
1972	Donald Fagen – keyboards, lead vocals; Walter Becker – bass, backing vocals; Denny Dias – guitar, backing vocals; Jeff Baxter – guitar, backing vocals; Jim Hodder – drums, backing and lead vocals	none
1972 – 1973	Donald Fagen – keyboards, lead and backing vocals; Walter Becker – bass, backing vocals; Denny Dias – guitar, backing vocals; Jeff Baxter – guitar, backing vocals; Jim Hodder – drums, backing and lead vocals; David Palmer – lead and backing vocals	Can't Buy a Thrill (1972); Countdown to Ecstasy (1973) unspecified tracks
1973	Donald Fagen – keyboards, lead vocals; Walter Becker – bass, backing vocals; Denny Dias – guitar, backing vocals; Jeff Baxter – guitar, backing vocals; Jim Hodder – drums, backing vocals; with: Gloria 'Porky' Granola – backing vocals (touring); Jenny 'Bucky' Soule – backing vocals (touring)	Countdown to Ecstasy (1973) unspecified tracks
1973 – 1974	Donald Fagen – keyboards, lead vocals; Walter Becker – bass, guitar, backing vocals; Denny Dias – guitar, backing vocals; Jeff Baxter – guitar, backing vocals; Jim Hodder – drums, backing vocals; Royce Jones – backing vocals, percussion; with: Gloria 'Porky' Granola – backing vocals (touring); Jenny 'Bucky' Soule – backing vocals (touring)	Countdown to Ecstasy (1973) unspecified tracks; Pretzel Logic (1974)
1974	Donald Fagen – keyboards, lead vocals; Walter Becker – bass, guitar, backing vocals; Denny Dias – guitar, backing vocals; Jeff Baxter – guitar, backing vocals; Jim Hodder – drums, backing vocals; Royce Jones – backing vocals, percussion; Jeff Porcaro – drums; Michael McDonald – keyboards, backing vocals	none – live performances only
1974 – 1981	Donald Fagen – keyboards, lead vocals; Walter Becker – guitar, bass, backing vocals; with various session musicians, including: Denny Dias – guitar (session until 1977); Jeff Porcaro – drums (session in 1974 and 1980); Michael McDonald – backing vocals (session until 1980)	Katy Lied (1975); The Royal Scam (1976); Aja (1977); Gaucho (1980)
Band inactive 1981 – 1993
August 1993 – April 1994	Donald Fagen – keyboards, vocals; Walter Becker – guitar, vocals; with: Drew Zingg – guitar; Tom Barney – bass; Chris Potter – alto and tenor saxophone; Bob Sheppard – soprano and tenor saxophone; Warren Bernhardt – piano, keyboards; Bill Ware – vibraphone, percussion; Catherine Russell – backing vocals, percussion; Diane Garisto – backing vocals, percussion; Brenda White-King – backing vocals, percussion; Peter Erskine – drums	Alive in America (1995) three tracks
August – September 1994	Donald Fagen – keyboards, vocals; Walter Becker – guitar, vocals; with: Georg Wadenius – guitar; Tom Barney – bass; Chris Potter – alto and tenor saxophone; Bob Sheppard – soprano and tenor saxophone; Warren Bernhardt – piano, keyboards; Bill Ware – vibraphone, percussion; Catherine Russell – backing vocals, percussion; Diane Garisto – backing vocals, percussion; Brenda White-King – backing vocals, percussion; Dennis Chambers – drums	Alive in America (1995) remaining tracks
1995	Donald Fagen – keyboards, vocals; Walter Becker – guitar, vocals; with: Drew Zingg – guitar; Tom Barney – bass; Chris Potter – alto and tenor saxophone; Bob Sheppard – soprano and tenor saxophone; John Beasley – piano, keyboards; Bill Ware – vibraphone, percussion; Catherine Russell – backing vocals, percussion; Diane Garisto – backing vocals, percussion; Brenda White-King – backing vocals, percussion; Peter Erskine – drums	none – live performances only
1996	Donald Fagen – keyboards, lead vocals; Walter Becker – guitar, vocals; with: Wayne Krantz – guitar; Tom Barney – bass; Cornelius Bumpus – saxophone; Ari Ambrose – saxophone; Michael Leonhart – trumpet; John Beasley – piano, keyboards; Ricky Lawson – drums; Michelle Wiley – backing vocals; Carolyn Leonhart – backing vocals	none – live performances only
January 2000	Donald Fagen – keyboards, lead vocals; Walter Becker – guitar, bass, vocals; with: Tom Barney – bass; Cornelius Bumpus – saxophone; Michael Leonhart – trumpet; Ricky Lawson – drums; Carolyn Leonhart – backing vocals; Jon Herington – guitar, backing vocals; Ted Baker – keyboards, piano; Chris Potter – saxophone; Jim Pugh – trombone; Cynthia Calhoun – backing vocals; Victoria Cave – backing vocals	Two Against Nature (2000); Plush TV Jazz-Rock Party (2000)
May – September 2000	Donald Fagen – keyboards, lead vocals; Walter Becker – guitar, vocals; with: Tom Barney – bass; Cornelius Bumpus – saxophone; Michael Leonhart – trumpet; Ricky Lawson – drums; Carolyn Leonhart – backing vocals; Jon Herington – guitar, backing vocals; Ted Baker – keyboards, piano; Chris Potter – saxophone; Jim Pugh – trombone; Cynthia Calhoun – backing vocals; Victoria Cave – backing vocals; Ari Ambrose – saxophone; Bob Sheppard – saxophone	none – live performances only
July – October 2003	Donald Fagen – keyboards, lead vocals; Walter Becker – guitar, bass, vocals; with: Tom Barney – bass; Cornelius Bumpus – saxophone; Michael Leonhart – trumpet; Carolyn Leonhart – backing vocals; Jon Herington – guitar, backing vocals; Ted Baker – keyboards, piano; Jim Pugh – trombone; Cynthia Calhoun – backing vocals; Cindy Mizelle – backing vocals; Walt Weiskopf – saxophone; Keith Carlock – drums	Everything Must Go (2003)
July 2006 – September 2007	Donald Fagen – keyboards, lead vocals; Walter Becker – guitar, vocals; with: Michael Leonhart – trumpet; Carolyn Leonhart – backing vocals; Jon Herington – guitar, backing vocals; Jim Pugh – trombone; Cynthia Calhoun – backing vocals; Cindy Mizelle – backing vocals; Walt Weiskopf – saxophone; Keith Carlock – drums; Freddie Washington – bass; Jeff Young – keyboards, backing vocals; Roger Rosenberg – baritone saxophone	none – live performances only
June – November 2008	Donald Fagen – keyboards, lead vocals; Walter Becker – guitar, vocals; with: Michael Leonhart – trumpet; Carolyn Leonhart – backing vocals; Jon Herington – guitar, backing vocals; Jim Pugh – trombone; Cynthia Calhoun – backing vocals; Cindy Mizelle – backing vocals; Walt Weiskopf – saxophone; Keith Carlock – drums; Freddie Washington – bass; Jeff Young – keyboards, backing vocals; Roger Rosenberg – baritone saxophone; Nelson Foltz – trumpet; Tawatha Agee – backing vocals	none – live performances only
June – November 2009	Donald Fagen – keyboards, lead vocals; Walter Becker – guitar, vocals; with: Michael Leonhart – trumpet; Carolyn Leonhart – backing vocals; Jon Herington – guitar, backing vocals; Jim Pugh – trombone; Cynthia Calhoun – backing vocals; Cindy Mizelle – backing vocals; Walt Weiskopf – saxophone; Keith Carlock – drums; Freddie Washington – bass; Roger Rosenberg – baritone saxophone; Tawatha Agee – backing vocals; Jim Beard – keyboards	none – live performances only
July – September 2011	Donald Fagen – keyboards, lead vocals; Walter Becker – guitar, vocals; with: Michael Leonhart – trumpet; Carolyn Leonhart – backing vocals; Jon Herington – guitar, backing vocals; Jim Pugh – trombone; Cynthia Calhoun – backing vocals; Cindy Mizelle – backing vocals; Walt Weiskopf – saxophone; Keith Carlock – drums; Freddie Washington – bass; Roger Rosenberg – baritone saxophone; Jim Beard – keyboards; Catherine Russell – backing vocals	none – live performances only
July 2013 – September 2017	Donald Fagen – keyboards, lead vocals; Walter Becker – guitar, vocals; with: Michael Leonhart – trumpet; Carolyn Leonhart – backing vocals; Jon Herington – guitar, backing vocals; Jim Pugh – trombone; Cindy Mizelle – backing vocals; Walt Weiskopf – saxophone; Keith Carlock – drums; Freddie Washington – bass; Roger Rosenberg – baritone saxophone; Jim Beard – keyboards; La Tanya Hall – backing vocals	none – live performances only
October 2017	Donald Fagen – keyboards, lead vocals; with: Michael Leonhart – trumpet; Carolyn Leonhart – backing vocals; Jon Herington – guitar, backing vocals; Jim Pugh – trombone; Cindy Mizelle – backing vocals; Walt Weiskopf – saxophone; Keith Carlock – drums; Freddie Washington – bass; Roger Rosenberg – baritone saxophone; Jim Beard – keyboards; La Tanya Hall – backing vocals	none – live performances only
May – October 2018	Donald Fagen – keyboards, lead vocals; with: Michael Leonhart – trumpet; Carolyn Leonhart – backing vocals; Jon Herington – guitar, backing vocals; Jim Pugh – trombone; Walt Weiskopf – saxophone; Keith Carlock – drums; Freddie Washington – bass; Roger Rosenberg – baritone saxophone; Jim Beard – keyboards; La Tanya Hall – backing vocals; Catherine Russell – backing vocals	none – live performances only
February – December 2019	Donald Fagen – keyboards, lead vocals; with: Michael Leonhart – trumpet; Carolyn Leonhart – backing vocals; Jon Herington – guitar, backing vocals; Jim Pugh – trombone; Walt Weiskopf – saxophone; Keith Carlock – drums; Freddie Washington – bass; Roger Rosenberg – baritone saxophone; Jim Beard – keyboards; La Tanya Hall – backing vocals; Catherine Russell – backing vocals; Ari Ambrose – saxophone; Jamie Leonhart – backing vocals; Nicki Richards – backing vocals; Connor Kennedy – guitar, vocals	none – live performances only
October – November 2021	Donald Fagen – keyboards, lead vocals; with: Michael Leonhart – trumpet; Carolyn Leonhart – backing vocals; Jon Herington – guitar, backing vocals; Jim Pugh – trombone; Walt Weiskopf – saxophone; Keith Carlock – drums; Freddie Washington – bass; Roger Rosenberg – baritone saxophone; Jim Beard – keyboards; La Tanya Hall – backing vocals; Catherine Russell – backing vocals; Cindy Mizelle – backing vocals	none – live performances only
May 2022 – March 2024	Donald Fagen – keyboards, lead vocals; with: Michael Leonhart – trumpet; Carolyn Leonhart – backing vocals; Jon Herington – guitar, backing vocals; Jim Pugh – trombone; Walt Weiskopf – saxophone; Keith Carlock – drums; Freddie Washington – bass; Roger Rosenberg – baritone saxophone; Jim Beard – keyboards; La Tanya Hall – backing vocals; Catherine Russell – backing vocals; Adam Rogers – guitar	none – live performances only
March – May 2024	Donald Fagen – keyboards, lead vocals; with: Michael Leonhart – trumpet; Carolyn Leonhart – backing vocals; Jon Herington – guitar, backing vocals; Jim Pugh – trombone; Bob Sheppard – saxophone; Keith Carlock – drums; Freddie Washington – bass; Roger Rosenberg – baritone saxophone; La Tanya Hall – backing vocals; Catherine Russell – backing vocals; Adam Rogers – guitar; Larry Goldings – keyboards	none – live performances only
