= Plush TV Jazz-Rock Party =

Video by Steely Dan
- Released: June 13, 2000
- Recorded: January 2000
- Studio: Sony Studios (New York City, New York)
- Genre: Jazz rock
- Length: 102:00
- Label: Image Entertainment
- Producer: Joel Hinman

Steely Dan chronology
| Two Against Nature (2000) | Plush TV Jazz-Rock Party (2000) | Everything Must Go (2003) |

Professional ratings
Review scores
| Source | Rating |
|---|---|
| AllMusic | 4.5/5 stars |

Plush TV Jazz-Rock Party is a live video recording of a PBS In the Spotlight special on Steely Dan, released in 2000. This video focuses on a special concert, recorded live in January 2000 at Sony Studios in New York City, New York, and features tracks from their (at the time) unreleased album Two Against Nature (2000) but also contains additional documentary footage.

== Track listing ==
All songs composed by Walter Becker and Donald Fagen.

1. "Green Earrings"
2. "Cousin Dupree"
3. "Bad Sneakers"
4. "Janie Runaway"
5. "Josie"
6. "FM"
7. "Gaslighting Abbie"
8. "Black Friday"
9. "Babylon Sisters"
10. "Kid Charlemagne"
11. "Jack of Speed"
12. "Peg"
13. "What a Shame About Me"
14. "Pretzel Logic"; End Credits

== Personnel ==
- Walter Becker – guitar
- Donald Fagen – Fender Rhodes, Lead Vocals
- Ted Baker – piano
- Jon Herington – guitar
- Tom Barney – bass
- Cornelius Bumpus and Chris Potter – saxophone
- Michael Leonhart – trumpet
- Jim Pugh – trombone
- Ricky Lawson – drums
- Carolyn Leonhart, Cynthia Calhoun and Victoria Cave – vocals

== Production ==
- Director: Earle Sebastian
- Producer: Joel Hinman
- Executive producers: Craig Fruin and John Beug
- Executive producers for Believe: Luke Thornton and Liz Silver
- Executive producer for In the Spotlight: David Horn
- Recording and mixing: Elliot Scheiner and Roger Nichols
- Representation: Craig Fruin/HK Management
- Package photography: Michael Northrop, Photodisc and Annalisa
