= Cousin Dupree =

2000 song performed by Steely Dan

Single by Steely Dan featuring Carolyn Leonhart

from the album Two Against Nature
- Released: 2000
- Recorded: 1998
- Genre: Rock
- Length: 5:26
- Label: Giant
- Songwriters: Walter Becker, Donald Fagen
- Producers: Walter Becker, Donald Fagen

Steely Dan featuring Carolyn Leonhart singles chronology
"Time Out of Mind" (1981)	"Cousin Dupree" (2000)	"Blues Beach" (2003)

Official audio
- Cousin Dupree on YouTube

"Cousin Dupree" is a single released in 2000 from Steely Dan's album Two Against Nature, also released that year. The female vocals of this song were provided by Carolyn Leonhart.

== Background ==
The song's lyrics describe the sexual desires the narrator, Dupree, has for his attractive cousin Janine. In 2001, the song won a Grammy Award for Best Pop Performance by a Duo or Group with Vocal.

In July 2006, Steely Dan posted a humorous letter on their website saying that the title of Owen Wilson's film You, Me and Dupree was stolen from their song. The film is about a house guest who overstays his welcome; the song's title character is a slacker who is sleeping on his aunt's couch. Owen Wilson defended himself in similarly deadpan comic fashion, stating, "I have never heard the song 'Cousin Dupree' and I don't even know who this gentleman, Mr. Steely Dan, is. I hope this helps to clear things up and I can get back to concentrating on my new movie, 'HEY 19.'"

== Release ==
The single included live tracks from the band's 90's American tour. "Aja" is taken from the album Alive in America, while the other two songs are exclusive to the single.

== Tracklisting ==
All tracks are written by Walter Becker and Donald Fagen.

No.	Title	Length
1.	"Cousin Dupree" (Edit)	4:23
2.	"Aja" (Live)	8:40
3.	"Fall Of '92" (Live)	6:09
4.	"Overture" (Live)	8:00

== Personnel ==
- Donald Fagen – Wurlitzer piano and lead, male vocalist
- Walter Becker – bass guitar, guitars
- Leroy Clouden – drums
- Jon Herington – rhythm guitar
- Ted Baker – Rhodes piano
- Carolyn Leonhart – female vocalist
- Amy Helm – whistling
