= Two Against Nature =

Studio album by Steely Dan
- Released: February 29, 2000
- Recorded: 1997–1999
- Studios: River Sound (New York City); Clinton Sound (New York City); Hyperbolic Sound (Maui); Electric Lady Studios (New York City)
- Genres: Rock; jazz pop; post-funk; jazz-funk
- Length: 51:24
- Label: Giant
- Producers: Walter Becker; Donald Fagen

Steely Dan chronology
Alive in America (1995)	Two Against Nature (2000)	Plush TV Jazz-Rock Party (2000)

Singles from Two Against Nature
- 1. "Cousin Dupree (promo)" Released: 2000

Two Against Nature is the eighth studio album by American rock band Steely Dan. Their first studio album in 20 years, it was recorded from 1997 to 1999 and released on February 29, 2000, by Giant Records.

A critical success, Two Against Nature won the group four Grammy Awards: Album of the Year, Best Pop Vocal Album, Best Engineered Album – Non-Classical, and Best Pop Performance by a Duo or Group with Vocals (for the single "Cousin Dupree"). Commercially, it peaked at number six on the U.S. Billboard 200 chart and sold more than one million copies, earning a Platinum certification from the Recording Industry Association of America.

== Reception and legacy ==
Professional ratings
Aggregate scores
Source	Rating
Metacritic	77/100
Review scores
Source	Rating
AllMusic	4/5 stars
Robert Christgau	A
Entertainment Weekly	A
The Guardian	3/5 stars
Los Angeles Times	4/4 stars
NME	7/10
Pitchfork	1.6/10
Q	4/5 stars
Rolling Stone	3.5/5 stars
Uncut	5/5 stars

Two Against Nature was met with both commercial and critical success. At Metacritic, which assigns a normalized rating out of 100 to reviews from professional critics, the album received an average score of 77, based on 13 reviews, indicating "generally favorable reviews". Writing in March 2000 for The Village Voice, Robert Christgau applauded the music as an excellent "rock comeback" and a "jumpier and snappier, sourer and trickier and less soothing" iteration of the jazz pop featured on Steely Dan's 1977 album Aja, describing it as "postfunk". Thematically, he found it unified by fictitious yet revelatory accounts of "dirty old men" seeking "validation" and "excitement" in their sex lives, which are "full of heady infatuations and random acts of cruelty, self-interest and self-hate, vicious cycles blowing hot and cold", all conveying "the urgency of attraction". Stephen Thomas Erlewine of AllMusic appreciated the "sharp humor" in the lyrics, but was especially impressed by the music's "depth and character", as he observed "nearly endless permutations within their signature sound". A dissenting view came from Pitchfork reviewer Brent DiCrescenzo, who dismissed the songs as "lengthy, indistinguishable" and "glossy bop-pop" while suggesting Steely Dan lack "soul".

At the 2001 Grammy Awards, Two Against Nature earned Steely Dan wins in the categories of Album of the Year, Best Pop Vocal Album, Best Engineered Album – Non-Classical, and Best Pop Performance by a Duo or Group with Vocals (for the single "Cousin Dupree"). For these awards, the band was in competition with younger, more popular recording acts such as NSYNC, Britney Spears, Radiohead, Beck, and Eminem. According to Stereogum writer Zach Schonfeld, Steely Dan's success at the Grammys represented a "revenge of the [baby] boomers" and contributed to resentment among younger listeners toward the band: "[T]he sight of two smug jazz-rock nerds collecting their Grammy from Stevie Wonder as Radiohead and Beck went home nearly empty-handed—helps explain why so many Gen X-ers and old millennials grew up loathing both Steely Dan and the Grammys in equal measure. Needless to say, Steely Dan's elliptical character studies set to yacht rock sleaze didn't speak to disaffected American youth the way, say, The Marshall Mathers LP did."

Steely Dan's supporting tour of North America, Europe, and Japan was equally successful, encouraging them to record the 2003 album Everything Must Go.

== Track listing ==
All tracks are written by Walter Becker and Donald Fagen.

Two Against Nature track listing
No.	Title	Length
1.	"Gaslighting Abbie"	5:53
2.	"What a Shame About Me"	5:17
3.	"Two Against Nature"	6:17
4.	"Janie Runaway" (featuring Carolyn Leonhart)	4:09
5.	"Almost Gothic"	4:10
6.	"Jack of Speed"	6:17
7.	"Cousin Dupree" (featuring Carolyn Leonhart)	5:26
8.	"Negative Girl"	5:34
9.	"West of Hollywood"	8:21

== Personnel ==
=== Steely Dan ===
- Donald Fagen – lead vocals (all tracks), Fender Rhodes (1–3), Clavinet (1), piano (2, 3, 8), Wurlitzer piano (4–7), organ (9)
- Walter Becker – bass (2–7), guitar (1, 2, 4, 6, 7), lead guitar (3, 9)

=== Additional musicians ===
- Ted Baker – Fender Rhodes (4, 5, 7–9), piano (9)
- Jon Herington – rhythm guitar (3, 7–9), acoustic guitar (5)
- Hugh McCracken – guitar (5)
- Paul Jackson Jr. – guitar (8)
- Dean Parks – guitar (8)
- Tom Barney – bass (1, 8, 9)
- Ricky Lawson – drums (1)
- Michael White – drums (2, 6)
- Keith Carlock – drums (3)
- Leroy Clouden – drums (4, 5, 7)
- Vinnie Colaiuta – drums (8)
- Sonny Emory – drums (9)
- Gordon Gottlieb – percussion (2, 3, 5, 6, 9)
- Daniel Sadownick – percussion (3), timbales (3)
- Will Lee – percussion (6)
- Steve Shapiro – vibraphone (3, 8)
- Amy Helm – whistle (7)
- Lawrence Feldman – clarinet (1, 5), tenor saxophone (4, 6), alto saxophone (5), saxophone (3)
- Roy Hitchcock – clarinet (3)
- Lou Marini – alto saxophone (4, 6), tenor saxophone (2)
- Chris Potter – tenor saxophone solo (1, 9), alto saxophone solo (4)
- David Tofani – tenor saxophone (1), saxophone (3)
- Roger Rosenberg – bass clarinet (1, 3–5), baritone saxophone (2, 6)
- Michael Leonhart – trumpet (1–6), Wurlitzer (3, 8)
- Jim Pugh – trombone (1–3, 5, 6)
- Cynthia Calhoun – female background vocals (1–3, 9), female harmony vocalist (6), background vocals (8)
- Carolyn Leonhart – female background vocals (1–3, 9), female harmony vocalist (5), background vocals (8); female vocalist (4, 7)
- Michael Harvey – male background vocalist (1–3, 9); male harmony vocalist (5, 6)

=== Production ===
- Producers: Walter Becker, Donald Fagen
- Executive engineer: Roger Nichols
- Engineers: Phil Burnett, Per-Christian Nielsen, Johan Edlund, Anthony Gorman, Roger Nichols, Ken Ross, Dave Russell, HEG Audio, Jay A. Ryan, Elliot Scheiner, Peter Scriba
- Mixing: Roger Nichols, Dave Russell
- Mastering: Scott Hull
- Assistants: Suzy Barros, Reaann Zschokke
- Technician: Roger Nichols
- Editing: Jan Folkson
- Horn arrangements: Walter Becker (1), Donald Fagen (1, 2, 4–6), Michael Leonhart (1, 3)
- Project manager: Jill Dell'Abate
- Project coordinator: Suzana Haugh
- Consultant: Michael Leonhart
- Piano tuner: Sam Berd
- Electric piano technician: Edd Kolakowski
- Design: Carol Bobolts
- Photography: Michael Northrup/Jason Fulford
- Copyist: Michael Leonhart

== Charts ==
=== Weekly charts ===
Weekly chart performance for Two Against Nature
Chart (2000)	Peak position
Australian Albums (ARIA)	51
Belgian Albums (Ultratop Flanders)	16
Canada Top Albums/CDs (RPM)	6
Dutch Albums (Album Top 100)	19
Finnish Albums (Suomen virallinen lista)	22
German Albums (Offizielle Top 100)	11
Irish Albums (IRMA)	17
Japanese Albums (Oricon)	24
New Zealand Albums (RMNZ)	39
Norwegian Albums (VG-lista)	7
Scottish Albums (Official Charts)	19
Swedish Albums (Sverigetopplistan)	17
UK Albums (Official Charts)	11
US Billboard 200	6

Weekly chart performance for Two Against Nature
Chart (2026)	Peak position
Hungarian Physical Albums (MAHASZ)	22

=== Year-end charts ===
Year-end chart performance for Two Against Nature
Chart (2000)	Position
US Billboard 200	127

== Certifications ==
Certifications for Two Against Nature
Region	Certification	Certified units/sales
Canada (Music Canada)	Gold	50,000^{^}
United Kingdom (BPI)	Silver	60,000^{*}
United States (RIAA)	Platinum	1,000,000^{^}
^{*} Sales figures based on certification alone.^{^} Shipments figures based on certification alone.

== Awards ==
2001 Grammy Awards

Winner	Category
"Cousin Dupree"	Best Pop Performance by a Duo or Group with Vocal
Two Against Nature	Album of the Year
Two Against Nature	Best Engineered Recording, Non-Classical
Two Against Nature	Best Pop Vocal Album
