= The Dukes of September =

US musical group (2010–2012)

- Origin: New York City, New York, United States
- Genres: R&B, blue-eyed soul, jazz rock
- Years active: 2010–2012
- Label: 429
- Spinoff of: The New York Rock and Soul Revue
- Past members: Donald Fagen; Michael McDonald; Boz Scaggs with Jon Herington; Freddie Washington; Shannon Forrest; Jim Beard; Jay Collins; Michael Leonhart; Walt Weiskopf; Carolyn Leonhart; Catherine Russell

The Dukes of September was an American supergroup, formed in 2010 featuring Donald Fagen, Michael McDonald and Boz Scaggs. The project was a resurrection of the previous New York Rock and Soul Revue, which featured the same three musicians and played a combination of hits from the members' respective careers as well as a wide variety of covers.

== Background ==
Donald Fagen and Michael McDonald began working together in the mid-1970s when McDonald would collaborate with Steely Dan, singing and playing keyboards on a lot of their material. The two worked together again during the early 1990s in the short lived New York Rock and Soul Revue which also included Boz Scaggs, Phoebe Snow, Eddie Brigati, David Brigati, Charles Brown, Walter Becker, Cornelius Bumpus and Mindy Jostyn.

In 2010 it was announced that Fagen, McDonald and Scaggs would do a fall tour together as the Dukes of September. The band was rounded out by Steely Dan touring members Jon Herington (guitar), Freddie Washington (bass), Michael White (drums; replaced by Shannon Forrest), Jim Beard (organ), Jay Collins (horns), Michael Leonhart (horns), Walt Weiskopf (horns), Carolyn Escoffery (vocals) and Catherine Russell (vocals).

The tour kicked off on August 19, 2010, in Danbury, Connecticut. The band played a collection of hits from the members' careers as well as a wide variety of covers, notably three Band covers in a row.

On June 14, 2012, the band performed on Late Night with Jimmy Fallon to promote their 2012 summer concert tour.

== PBS concert ==
A concert filmed at Lincoln Center in New York City in November 2012 was broadcast as a 90-minute Great Performances special on PBS in March 2014 and released at the same time on DVD and Blu-ray discs by 429 Records. Songs included:

1. "People Get Up and Drive Your Funky Soul"
2. "Who's That Lady?"
3. "Sweet Soul Music"
4. "I Keep Forgettin'"
5. "Kid Charlemagne"
6. "The Same Thing"
7. "Miss Sun"
8. "You Never Can Tell"
9. "What a Fool Believes"
10. "Hey Nineteen"
11. "Love T.K.O."
12. "Peg"
13. "Lowdown"
14. "Takin' It to the Streets"
15. "Reelin' in the Years"
16. "Lido Shuffle"
17. "Pretzel Logic"
18. "Them Changes"
