= Steely Dan =

American rock band

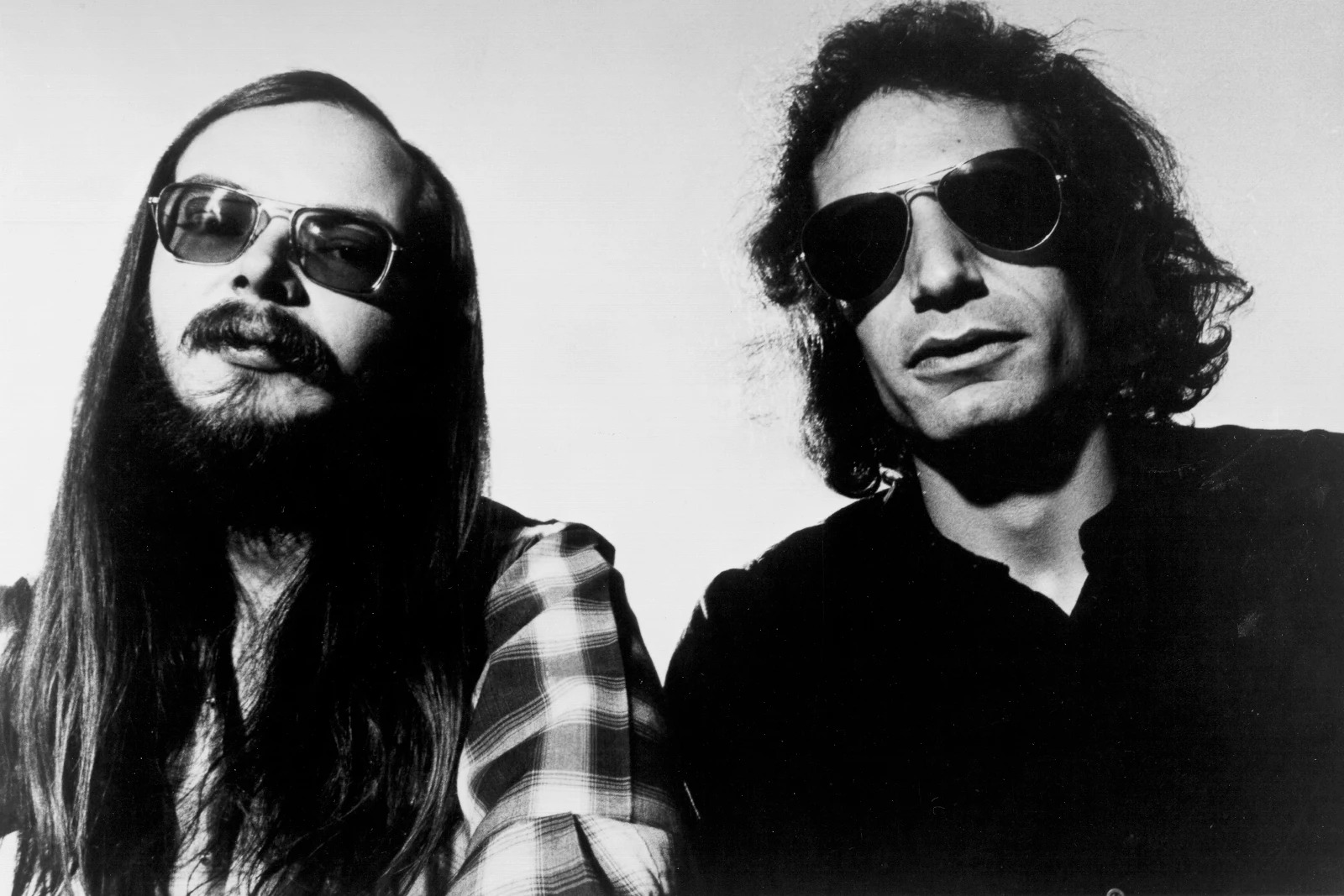
- Steely Dan in 1977: Walter Becker (left) and Donald Fagen (right)

Background information
- Origin: Annandale-on-Hudson, New York, U.S.
- Genres: Jazz rock; soft rock; pop rock; jazz fusion
- Works: Discography
- Years active: 1971–1981; 1993–2024
- Labels: ABC; MCA; Giant; Reprise; Warner Bros.
- Spinoffs: The Dukes of September
- Past members: Donald Fagen; Walter Becker; Jeff Baxter; Denny Dias; Jim Hodder; David Palmer; Royce Jones; see List of Steely Dan members
- Website: steelydan.com

Steely Dan was an American rock band formed in Annandale-on-Hudson, New York, in 1971 by Walter Becker (guitars, bass, backing vocals) and Donald Fagen (keyboards, lead vocals). Originally having a traditional band lineup, Becker and Fagen chose to stop performing live by the end of 1974 and continued Steely Dan as a studio-only duo, using a revolving cast of session musicians. Rolling Stone magazine named them "the perfect musical antiheroes for the seventies".

Becker and Fagen played together in a variety of bands from their time together studying at Bard College in Annandale-on-Hudson. They later moved to Los Angeles, gathered a band of musicians and began recording music. Their debut album, Can't Buy a Thrill (1972), established a template for their career, blending elements of rock, jazz, Latin music, R&B, and blues with sophisticated studio production and cryptic, irony-infused lyrics. The band enjoyed critical and commercial success with seven studio albums, peaking with their top-selling album Aja, released in 1977.

Steely Dan disbanded in 1981. Becker and Fagen worked sporadically on solo projects through the 1980s, although a cult following remained devoted to the group's work. After reuniting in 1993, Steely Dan toured steadily and released two albums of new material, the first of which, Two Against Nature (2000), earned a Grammy Award for Album of the Year at the 43rd Grammy Awards. Their final album of new studio material was 2003's Everything Must Go, though they continued to release compilations, box sets and live albums on a regular basis. After Becker's death in 2017, the band continued to tour with Fagen as the sole official member until 2024. Fagen later retired in 2026.

Steely Dan was inducted into the Rock and Roll Hall of Fame in 2001 and has sold more than 40 million records worldwide. VH1 ranked Steely Dan at No. 82 on their list of the "100 Greatest Musical Artists of All Time" in 2010, and Rolling Stone ranked them No. 15 on its list of the "20 Greatest Duos of All Time" in 2015.

== History ==
=== Formative and early years (1967–1972) ===
Walter Becker and Donald Fagen met in 1967 at Bard College, in Annandale-on-Hudson, New York. Becker approached Fagen in hopes of getting the bass player spot in the band Fagen led, but Fagen turned him down because the band's present bassist owned all their equipment and booked all their shows. Sometime later, as Fagen passed by The Red Balloon café, he heard Becker practicing the electric guitar. In an interview, Fagen recounted the experience: "I hear this guy practicing, and it sounded very professional and contemporary. It sounded like, you know, like a black person, really." He introduced himself to Becker and asked, "Do you want to be in a band?" Discovering that they enjoyed similar music, literature, and snarky humor, the two began writing songs together, and Fagen brought Becker in as the guitarist for his band.

Becker and Fagen played together in a number of local groups. One such group—known as the Don Fagen Jazz Trio, the Bad Rock Group and later the Leather Canary—included future comedy star Chevy Chase on drums. They played covers of songs by The Rolling Stones ("Dandelion"), Moby Grape ("Hey Grandma"), and Willie Dixon ("Spoonful"), as well as some original compositions. Terence Boylan, another Bard musician, remembered that Fagen took readily to the beatnik life while attending college: "They never came out of their room, they stayed up all night. They looked like ghosts—black turtlenecks and skin so white that it looked like yogurt. Absolutely no activity, chain-smoking Lucky Strikes and dope."

After Fagen graduated in 1969, the two moved to Brooklyn and tried to peddle their tunes in the Brill Building in midtown Manhattan. Kenny Vance (of Jay and the Americans), who had a production office in the building, took an interest in their music, which led to work on the soundtrack of the low-budget film (featuring Richard Pryor and Robert Downey Sr.) You've Got to Walk It Like You Talk It or You'll Lose That Beat. Becker later said bluntly, "We did it for the money." A series of Becker/Fagen songwriting demos from 1968 to 1971 have appeared in multiple releases, not authorized by Becker and Fagen. A few of the demos include guitar by Denny Dias, but more often they utilize vocalist Keith Thomas and drummer John Discepolo, and many of the demos have no performers aside from Becker and Fagen themselves. Although some of these songs ("The Caves of Altamira", "Brooklyn", "Barrytown") were re-recorded for Steely Dan albums, most were never officially released.

In 1970, Gary Katz produced an album by singer Linda Hoover, I Mean to Shine, featuring Fagen, Becker, and Jeff "Skunk" Baxter, and including five Becker/Fagen songs. The album was shelved over songwriting licensing issues, but was finally released 52 years later, in 2022. Becker and Fagen later joined the touring band of Jay and the Americans for about a year and a half. They were at first paid $100 per show, but partway through their tenure the band's tour manager cut their salaries in half. The group's lead singer, Jay Black, dubbed Becker and Fagen "the Manson and Starkweather of rock 'n' roll", referring to cult leader Charles Manson and spree killer Charles Starkweather.

They had little success after moving to Brooklyn, although Barbra Streisand recorded their song "I Mean to Shine" on her 1971 Barbra Joan Streisand album. Their fortunes changed when one of Vance's associates, Katz, moved to Los Angeles to become a staff producer for ABC Records. He hired Becker and Fagen as staff songwriters; they flew to California. Katz would produce all their 1970s albums in collaboration with engineer Roger Nichols. Nichols would win six Grammy Awards for his work with the band from the 1970s to 2001.

Believing that ABC artists could not handle the complexity of their songs, Becker and Fagen (at Katz's suggestion) formed their own band with Becker on bass, Fagen on keyboards, Dias and Baxter on guitars, and Jim Hodder on drums, and ABC signed them as recording artists. At this point the band had no lead singer; though Hodder had been both lead vocalist and drummer of his previous band, Bead Game, he did so only because they had been unable to find a replacement for their original lead vocalist, and preferred to remain primarily a drummer. Lacking a suitable alternative, Fagen reluctantly agreed to do lead vocals on most of Steely Dan's recordings. Fans of Beat Generation literature, Fagen and Becker named the band after a dildo mentioned in the William S. Burroughs novel Naked Lunch. Becker and Fagen had previously mentioned Steely Dan in the lyrics of their song "Soul Ram", which was among the aforementioned unreleased demos.

In 1972, ABC issued Steely Dan's first single, "Dallas", backed with "Sail the Waterway". However, ABC later decided that its country feel was too unrepresentative of Steely Dan's music to serve as an introduction to the band, and the single was withdrawn shortly after release. As of 2025, "Dallas" and "Sail the Waterway" are the only officially released Steely Dan tracks that have not been reissued on cassette or compact disc. In a 1995 interview, Becker and Fagen called the songs "stinko". "Dallas" was covered by Poco on their Head Over Heels album.

=== Can't Buy a Thrill and Countdown to Ecstasy (1972–1973) ===
During recording of Steely Dan's debut album, Can't Buy a Thrill, ABC broached the subject of touring to support the album. This made the band's search for a lead singer more urgent, since Fagen was terrified at the prospects of singing live and being a front man. Additionally, while the band members felt that Fagen as a vocalist conveyed the right attitude for their songs, they also recognized that he had a very small vocal range, and believed that a singer with a wider range could open up the possibilities of Becker and Fagen's songwriting. Already Becker and Fagen had had to consciously narrow the vocal melodies in their songs in order to enable Fagen to sing them. At Baxter's recommendation, David Palmer was brought in as Steely Dan's lead singer in time to finish the album, though most of the tracks had already been recorded with Fagen singing lead.

Can't Buy a Thrill was released in November 1972. Its hit singles "Do It Again" and "Reelin' In the Years" (both sung by Fagen) reached No. 6 and No. 11 respectively on the Billboard Hot 100. Along with "Dirty Work" (sung by Palmer), the songs became staples on rock radio.

Because of Fagen's reluctance to sing live, Palmer handled most of the vocal duties on stage, including three new songs written specifically to showcase Palmer's unique abilities as a singer, though Fagen sang lead on "Reelin' in the Years". However, Katz had objected to the recruitment of Palmer from the beginning, and by the end of the first tour, the band members had come to agree that he was not a good fit for the songs and in April 1973 fired him from the group. Palmer was understanding of the decision, stating in a 1997 interview, "There were two reasons for me leaving the Dan: First, I was asked to. Second, when you have a singer as great as Donald Fagen was and is, you don't need another lead singer in the band." He later co-wrote the No. 2 hit "Jazzman" (1974) with Carole King.

Sometime after recording Can't Buy a Thrill, Steely Dan wrote and recorded a jingle for Schlitz Beer that was rejected and never aired. Long considered lost, it was rediscovered in July 2023 by Cimcie Nichols in the archive of her late father Roger Nichols. The 1 minute and 50 second jingle has a distinct Steely Dan sound with layered vocals by Fagen, after a spoken word introduction in Spanish by Baxter (in a squeaky inhaled helium voice), with Fagen speaking an English translation. Recording took place in Studio A at The Village in Los Angeles. At the session, a photo was taken of Fagen in reindeer sweater and Dias in overalls and sombrero while holding a tank of helium that subsequently appeared on the back cover of Katy Lied.

For Steely Dan's second album, Countdown to Ecstasy, Fagen took on all the lead vocals. Village Voice rock critic Robert Christgau was pleased with the elevation of Fagen, saying that Palmer "fit in like a cheerleader at a crap game." Countdown to Ecstasy was released in July 1973 but was not as commercially successful as the band's debut album. Becker and Fagen were unhappy with some of the performances on the record and believed that it sold poorly because it had been recorded hastily on tour. The album's singles were "Show Biz Kids" and "My Old School", both of which stayed in the lower half of the Billboard charts, although "My Old School", and to a lesser extent, "Bodhisattva", became FM rock staples in time. “My Old School” is a direct homage to events that occurred at Bard College, where Becker and Fagen met.

Because Fagen was still uncomfortable with singing live, for the tour supporting Countdown to Ecstasy vocalist-percussionist Royce Jones was brought on as a touring member and sang lead on several of the songs.

=== Pretzel Logic and Katy Lied (1974–1976) ===
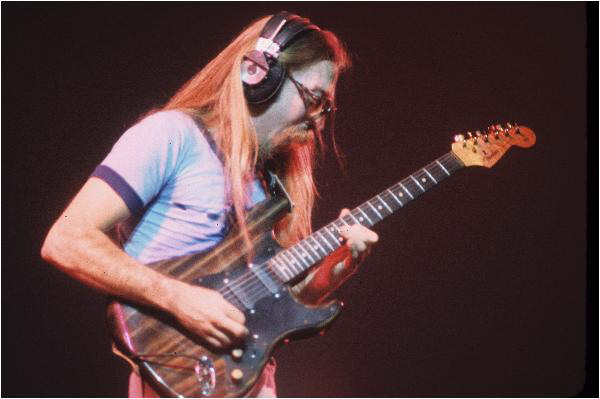
Guitarist Jeff "Skunk" Baxter left Steely Dan in 1974 when they ceased performing live and began working in the studio exclusively.

Pretzel Logic was released in February 1974. A diverse set, it includes the group's most successful single, "Rikki Don't Lose That Number" (No. 4 on the Billboard Hot 100), and a rendition of Duke Ellington and James "Bubber" Miley's "East St. Louis Toodle-Oo".

Session drummer Jeff Porcaro played the sole drum track on one song, "Night By Night", on Pretzel Logic (Jim Gordon played drums on all the remaining tracks, and he and Porcaro both played on "Parker's Band"), reflecting Steely Dan's increasing reliance on session musicians (including Dean Parks and Rick Derringer). Jeff Porcaro and Katy Lied pianist David Paich would go on to form Toto. Striving for perfection, Becker and Fagen sometimes asked musicians to record as many as forty takes of each track. Pretzel Logic was the first Steely Dan album to feature Walter Becker on guitar. "Once I met [session musician] Chuck Rainey", he explained, "I felt there really was no need for me to be bringing my bass guitar to the studio anymore". Despite this, Becker ended up playing bass guitar on more Steely Dan songs than any other musician, with Rainey coming second.

For Pretzel Logic's tour, the band added vocalist-keyboardist Michael McDonald and Porcaro as a second drummer. A rift began growing, with Becker and Fagen on one side and Steely Dan's other members, who wanted to tour (particularly Baxter and Hodder), on the other. Becker and Fagen disliked constant touring and wanted to concentrate solely on writing and recording. Ultimately Becker and Fagen dismissed the other three members and ended Steely Dan as a conventional band, reinventing it as a studio project. As a session musician, Dias made sporadic guest appearances on Steely Dan's albums, and Michael McDonald contributed vocals until the group's twenty-year hiatus after 1980's Gaucho, but Baxter and Hodder would never work with them again. Baxter and McDonald went on to join The Doobie Brothers. Steely Dan's last tour performance before their hiatus was on July 5, 1974, a concert at the Santa Monica Civic Auditorium in California.

Becker and Fagen recruited a diverse group of session players for Katy Lied (1975), including Porcaro, Paich, and McDonald, as well as guitarist Elliott Randall, jazz saxophonist Phil Woods, saxophonist/bassist Wilton Felder, percussionist/vibraphonist/keyboardist Victor Feldman, keyboardist (and later producer) Michael Omartian, and guitarist Larry Carlton—Dias, Becker, and Fagen being Steely Dan's only original members. The album went gold on the strength of "Black Friday" and "Bad Sneakers", but the band members were dissatisfied with the album's sound (compromised by a faulty DBX noise reduction system). Katy Lied also included "Doctor Wu" and "Chain Lightning".

=== The Royal Scam and Aja (1976–1978) ===
The Royal Scam was released in May 1976. Partly because of Carlton's prominent contributions, it is the band's most guitar-oriented album. It also features performances by session drummer Bernard Purdie. The album sold well in the United States, though without the strength of a hit single. In the UK, the single "Haitian Divorce" (Top 20) drove album sales, becoming Steely Dan's first major hit there. Steely Dan's sixth album, the more jazz-influenced Aja, was released in September 1977. Aja reached the Top 5 in the U.S. charts within three weeks and won the Grammy Award for "Engineer—Best Engineered Recording—Non-Classical" at the 1978 awards. It was also one of the first American LPs to receive a Platinum certification from the Recording Industry Association of America (RIAA) for sales of over 1 million.

Roger [Nichols] made those records sound like they did. He was extraordinary in his willingness and desire to make records sound better.

The records we did could not have been done without Roger. He was just maniacal about making the sound of the records be what we liked... He always thought there was a better way to do it, and he would find a way to do what we needed to in ways that other people hadn't done yet.

— Steely Dan producer Gary Katz regarding Roger Nichols' role in the band's recording legacy.

Featuring Michael McDonald's backing vocals, "Peg" (No. 11) was the album's first single, followed by "Josie" (No. 26) and "Deacon Blues" (No. 19). Aja solidified Becker's and Fagen's reputations as songwriters and studio perfectionists. It features such jazz and fusion luminaries as guitarists Larry Carlton and Lee Ritenour; bassist Chuck Rainey; saxophonists Wayne Shorter, Pete Christlieb, and Tom Scott; drummers Steve Gadd, Rick Marotta and Bernard Purdie; keyboardist Joe Sample, ex-Miles Davis pianist/vibraphonist Victor Feldman, and Grammy award-winning producer/arranger Michael Omartian (piano).

Planning to tour in support of Aja, Steely Dan assembled a live band. Rehearsal ended and the tour was canceled when backing musicians began comparing pay. The album's history was documented in an episode of the TV and DVD series Classic Albums.

After Aja's success, Becker and Fagen were asked to write the title track for the movie FM. The movie was a box-office disaster, but the song was a hit, earning Steely Dan another engineering Grammy award. It was a minor hit in the UK and barely missed the Top 20 in the US.

=== Gaucho and breakup (1978–1981) ===
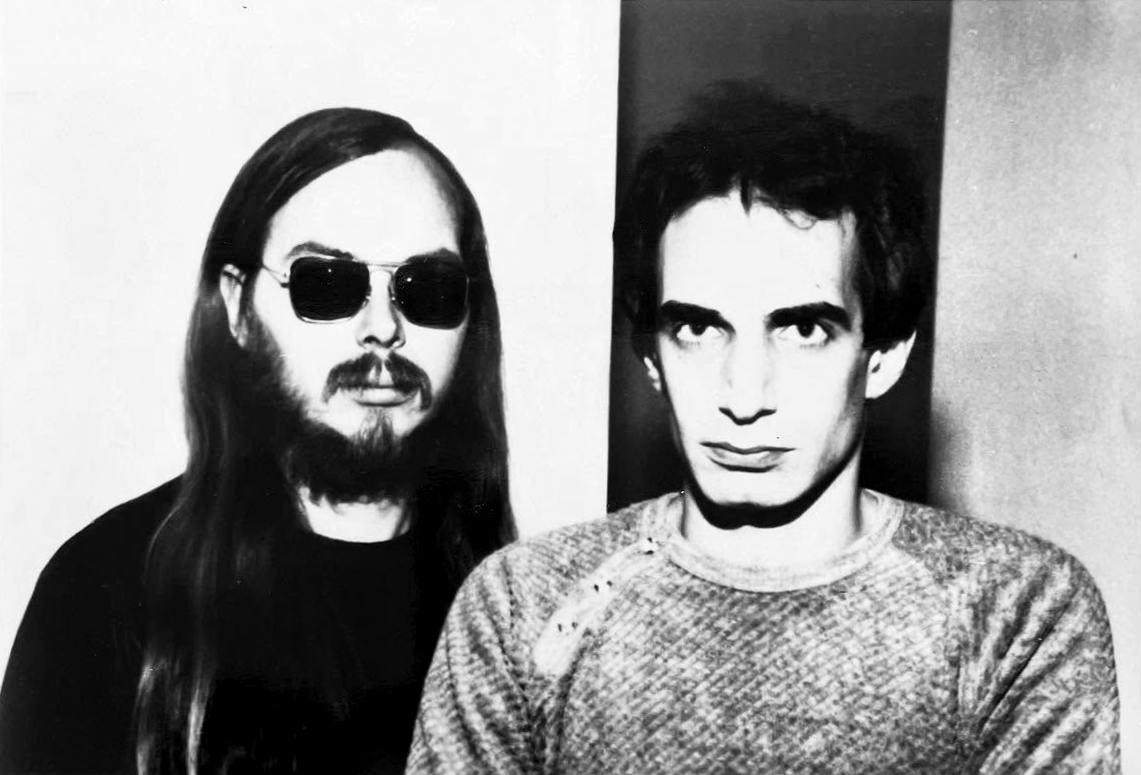
Becker and Fagen in a publicity photo for Gaucho.

Becker and Fagen took a break from songwriting for most of 1978 before starting work on Gaucho. The project would not go smoothly: technical, legal, and personal setbacks delayed the album's release and subsequently led Becker and Fagen to suspend their partnership for over a decade.

Misfortune struck early when an assistant engineer accidentally erased most of "The Second Arrangement", a favorite track of Katz and Nichols, which remained lost until a recording was discovered in 2020. More trouble—this time legal—followed. In March 1979, MCA Records bought ABC, and for much of the next two years Steely Dan could not release an album. Becker and Fagen had planned on leaving ABC for Warner Bros. Records, but MCA claimed ownership of their music, preventing them from changing labels.

Turmoil in Becker's personal life also interfered. In January 1980 his girlfriend Karen Stanley died of a drug overdose in their Upper West Side apartment, and in 1981 he was sued for $17 million by her mother, Lillian Wyshak, who claimed Becker had introduced her to heroin and cocaine. Becker settled out of court, but he was shocked by the accusations and by the tabloid press coverage that followed. Before the lawsuit, in April 1980, Becker was struck by a taxi while crossing a Manhattan street, shattering his right leg in several places. He was left hospitalized as work on the album's final mix was just beginning, and he was only able to collaborate with Fagen and Katz via telephone.

More legal trouble was to come. Jazz composer Keith Jarrett sued Steely Dan for copyright infringement, claiming that they had based Gaucho's title track on one of his compositions, "Long As You Know You're Living Yours". Fagen later admitted that he had loved the song and that it had been a strong influence. The lawsuit was settled, and Jarrett was added to the song as a co-writer.

Gaucho was finally released in November 1980. Despite its tortured history, it was another major success. The album's first single, "Hey Nineteen", reached No. 10 on the US charts in early 1981, and "Time Out of Mind" (featuring guitarist Mark Knopfler of Dire Straits) was a moderate hit in the spring. "My Rival" was featured in John Huston's 1980 film Phobia. Roger Nichols won a third engineering Grammy award for his work on the album.

=== Hiatus (1981–1993) ===
Steely Dan disbanded in June 1981. Becker moved to Maui, where he became an "avocado rancher and self-styled critic of the contemporary scene." He stopped using drugs, which he had used for most of his career. Meanwhile, Fagen released a solo album, The Nightfly (1982), which went platinum in both the US and the UK and yielded the Top-20 hit "I.G.Y. (What a Beautiful World)". In 1988, Fagen wrote the score of Bright Lights, Big City and a song for its soundtrack, but otherwise recorded little. He occasionally did production work for other artists, as did Becker. The most prominent of these were two albums Becker produced for the British sophisti-pop group China Crisis, who were strongly influenced by Steely Dan. Becker is listed as an official member of China Crisis on the first of these albums, 1985's Flaunt the Imperfection. For the second of the two albums, 1989's Diary of a Hollow Horse, Becker is only listed as a producer and not as a band member.

In 1986 Becker and Fagen performed on Zazu, an album by former model Rosie Vela produced by Gary Katz. The two rekindled their friendship and held songwriting sessions between 1986 and 1987, leaving the results unfinished. On October 23, 1991, Becker attended a concert by New York Rock and Soul Revue, co-founded by Fagen and producer/singer Libby Titus (who was for many years the partner of Levon Helm of The Band and would later become Fagen's wife), and spontaneously performed with the group.

Becker produced Fagen's second solo album, Kamakiriad, in 1993. Fagen conceived the album as a sequel to The Nightfly.

=== Reunion, Alive in America (1993–2000) ===
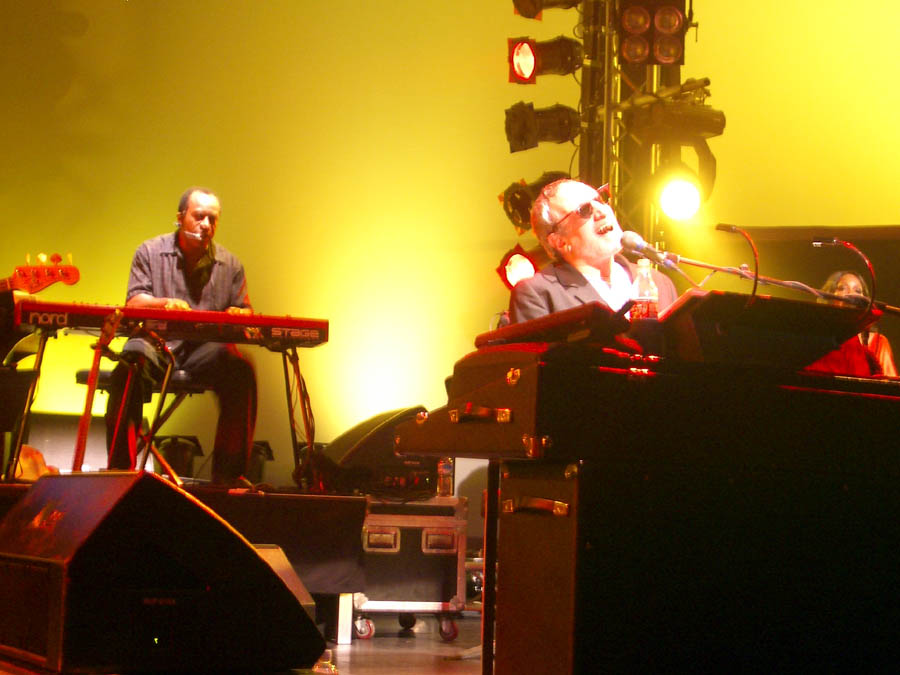
Steely Dan, shown here in 2007, toured frequently after reforming in 1993.

Becker and Fagen reunited for an American tour to support Kamakiriad, which sold poorly despite a Grammy nomination for Album of the Year. With Becker playing lead and rhythm guitar, the pair assembled a band that included a second keyboard player, second lead guitarist, bassist, drummer, vibraphonist, three female backing singers, and four-piece saxophone section. Among the musicians from the live band, several would continue to work with Steely Dan over the next decade, including bassist Tom Barney and saxophone players Cornelius Bumpus and Chris Potter. During this tour, Fagen introduced himself as "Rick Strauss" and Becker as "Frank Poulenc".

Later that year, MCA released Citizen Steely Dan, a boxed set featuring their entire catalog (except their debut single "Dallas"/"Sail The Waterway") on four CDs, plus four extra tracks: "Here at the Western World" (originally released on 1978's "Greatest Hits"), "FM" (1978 single), a 1971 demo of "Everyone's Gone to the Movies" and "Bodhisattva (live)", the latter recorded on a cassette in 1974 and released as a B-side in 1980. In 1994, Becker released his debut solo album, 11 Tracks of Whack, which Fagen co-produced.

Steely Dan toured again in 1994 in support of the boxed set and Tracks. In 1995 they released a live CD, Alive in America, compiled from recordings of several 1993 and 1994 concerts. The Art Crimes Tour followed in 1996, including dates in the United States, Japan, and their first European shows in 22 years. After this activity, Becker and Fagen returned to the studio to begin work on a new album, which would be recorded between 1997 and 1999.

=== Two Against Nature and Everything Must Go (2000–2003) ===
In 2000 Steely Dan released their first studio album in 20 years: Two Against Nature. It won four Grammy Awards: Best Engineered Album – Non-Classical, Best Pop Vocal Album, Best Pop Performance by Duo or Group with Vocal ("Cousin Dupree"), and Album of the Year (despite competition in this category from Eminem's The Marshall Mathers LP and Radiohead's Kid A). In the summer of 2000, they began another American tour, followed by an international tour later that year. The tour featured guitarist Jon Herington, who would go on to play with the band over the next two decades. The group released the Plush TV Jazz-Rock Party DVD, documenting a live-in-the-studio concert performance of popular songs from throughout Steely Dan's career. In March 2001, Steely Dan was inducted into the Rock and Roll Hall of Fame, at the ceremony playing "Black Friday" and teaming with Brian May to perform "Do It Again".

In 2002 during the recording of Everything Must Go, Becker and Fagen fired their engineer Roger Nichols, who had worked with them for 30 years, without explanation or notification, according to band biographer Brian Sweet's 2018 revision of his book Reelin' in the Years.

In 2003 Steely Dan released Everything Must Go. In contrast to their earlier work, they had tried to write music that captured a live feel. Becker sang lead vocals on a Steely Dan studio album for the first time ("Slang of Ages"—he had sung lead on his own "Book of Liars" on Alive in America). Fewer session musicians played on Everything Must Go than had become typical of Steely Dan albums: Becker played bass on every track and lead guitar on five tracks; Fagen added piano, electric piano, organ, synthesizers, and percussion on top of his vocals; touring drummer Keith Carlock played on every track.

=== Touring, solo activity (2003–2017) ===
To complete his Nightfly trilogy, Fagen issued Morph the Cat in 2006. Steely Dan returned to annual touring that year with the Steelyard "Sugartooth" McDan and The Fab-Originees.com Tour. Despite much fluctuation in membership, the live band featured mainstays Herington, Carlock, bassist Freddie Washington, the horn section of Michael Leonhart, Jim Pugh, Roger Rosenberg, and Walt Weiskopf, and backing vocalists Carolyn Leonhart and Cindy Mizelle. The 2007 Heavy Rollers Tour included dates in North America, Europe, Japan, Australia, and New Zealand, making it their most expansive tour.

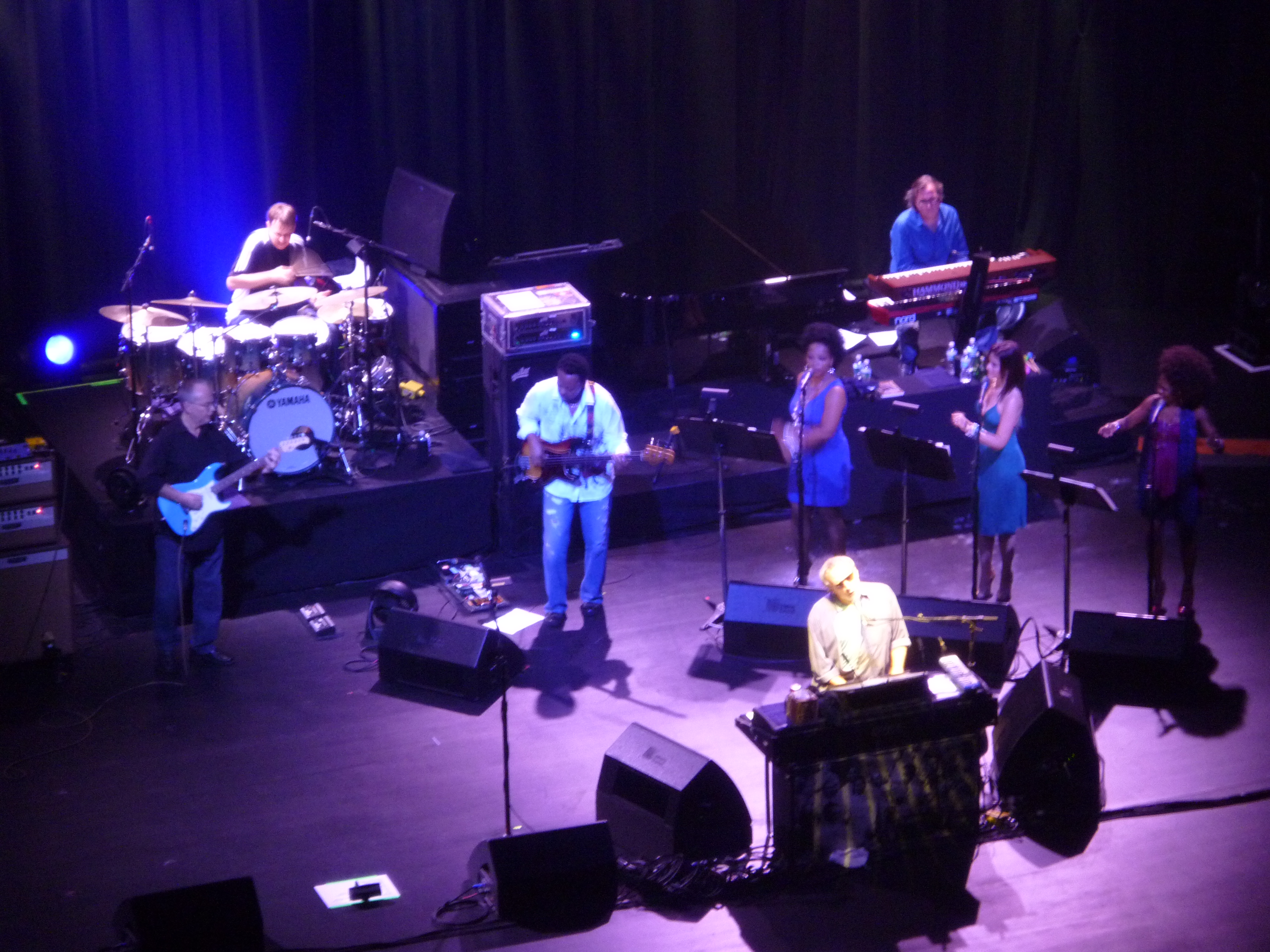
Steely Dan performing at the Beacon Theatre in New York City in 2009.

The smaller Think Fast Tour followed in 2008, with keyboardist Jim Beard joining the live band. That year Becker released a second album, Circus Money, produced by Larry Klein and inspired by Jamaican music. In 2009 Steely Dan toured Europe and America extensively in their Left Bank Holiday and Rent Party Tour, alternating between standard one-date concerts at large venues and multi-night theater shows that featured performances of The Royal Scam, Aja, or Gaucho in their entirety on certain nights. The following year, Fagen formed the touring supergroup Dukes of September Rhythm Revue with McDonald, Boz Scaggs, and members of Steely Dan's live band, whose repertoire included songs by all three songwriters. Longtime studio engineer Roger Nichols died of pancreatic cancer on April 10, 2011. Steely Dan's Shuffle Diplomacy Tour that year included an expanded set list and dates in Australia and New Zealand. Fagen released his fourth album, Sunken Condos, in 2012. It was his first solo release unrelated to the Nightfly trilogy.

The Mood Swings: 8 Miles to Pancake Day Tour began in July 2013 and featured an eight-night run at the Beacon Theatre in New York City. Jamalot Ever After, their 2014 United States tour, ran from July 2 in Portland, Oregon, to September 20 in Port Chester, New York. 2015's Rockabye Gollie Angel Tour included opening act Elvis Costello and the Imposters and dates at the Coachella Valley Music and Arts Festival. The Dan Who Knew Too Much tour followed in 2016, with Steve Winwood opening. Steely Dan also performed at The Hollywood Bowl in Los Angeles with an accompanying orchestra.

The band played its final shows with Becker in 2017. In April, they played the 12-date Reelin' In the Chips residency in Las Vegas and Southern California. Becker's final performance came on May 27 at the Greenwich Town Party in Greenwich, Connecticut. Due to illness, Becker did not play Steely Dan's two Classics East and West concerts at Dodger Stadium and Citi Field in July. Fagen embarked on a tour that summer with a new backing band, The Nightflyers.

=== Becker's death, final tours and retirement (2017–2026) ===
Becker died from complications of esophageal cancer on September 3, 2017. In a note released to the media, Fagen remembered his longtime friend and bandmate, and promised to "keep the music we created together alive as long as I can with the Steely Dan band." After Becker's death, Steely Dan honored commitments to perform a short North American tour in October 2017 and three concert dates in the United Kingdom and Ireland for Bluesfest on a double bill with the Doobie Brothers. The band played its first concert following Becker's death in Thackerville, Oklahoma, on October 13. In tribute to Becker, they performed his solo song "Book of Liars", with Fagen singing the lead vocals, at several concerts on the tour.

Becker's widow and estate sued Fagen later that year, arguing that the estate should control 50% of the band's shares. Fagen filed a counter suit, arguing that the band had drawn up plans in 1972 stating that band members leaving the band or dying relinquish shares of the band's output to the surviving members. In December, Fagen said that he would rather have retired the Steely Dan name after Becker's death, and would instead have toured with the current iteration of the group under another name, but was persuaded not to by promoters for commercial reasons.

In 2018, Steely Dan performed on a summer tour of the United States with The Doobie Brothers as co-headliners. The band also played a nine-show residency at the Beacon Theatre in New York City that October. In February 2019, the band embarked on a tour of Great Britain with Steve Winwood. Guitarist Connor Kennedy of The Nightflyers joined the live band, beginning with a nine-night residency at The Venetian Resort in Las Vegas in April 2019.

As of September 2021, the legal battle over the band's royalties was still ongoing, with Fagen speculating during an interview that "thousands of lawyers" were probably involved in the dispute. In July 2023, the Eagles announced Steely Dan would be the special guest of their The Long Farewell tour running from September to November 2023. In October 2023, Steely Dan was forced to cancel dates in Denver and Indianapolis after Fagen was hospitalized with an undisclosed illness. Sheryl Crow replaced the band in Denver and the Steve Miller Band in Indianapolis. The situation endured on November dates, as Tedeschi Trucks opened the Atlanta shows, and The Doobie Brothers performed as opening act in Charlotte, Raleigh, Lexington and St. Paul. By January 2024, Steely Dan rejoined the Eagles in Los Angeles. The band cancelled their appearance with the Eagles at Scotiabank Arena in Toronto, Ontario, March 13, 2024, with Tom Cochrane replacing them for that date. Steely Dan cancelled their scheduled 2024 UK and European tour dates supporting the Eagles due to "extenuating circumstances". Affected shows, part of the Long Goodbye tour, included Manchester (May 31, June 1, 4, 7, 8) and Arnhem, Netherlands (June 13). They were replaced on these dates by The Doobie Brothers.

In April 2026, Fagen's stepdaughter Amy Helm told Vulture that Fagen was "really enjoying being retired and not having any expectations or pressure", effectively signaling the end of Steely Dan.

== Musical and lyrical style ==
=== Music ===
==== Overall sound ====
Steely Dan's albums are notable for the characteristically "warm" and "dry" production sound, and the sparing use of echo and reverberation.

After the concept of yacht rock was conceived in 2005, the music of Steely Dan was retrospectively listed as falling into that soft rock style. Billboard wrote that Steely Dan's Aja album was the "sophisticated high-water mark" of yacht rock.

==== Backing vocals ====
Becker and Fagen favored a distinctly soul-influenced style of backing vocals, which after the first few albums were almost always performed by a female chorus (although Michael McDonald features prominently on several tracks, including the 1975 song "Black Friday" and the 1977 song "Peg"). Venetta Fields, Sherlie Matthews and Clydie King were the preferred trio for backing vocals on the group's late 1970s albums. Other backing vocalists include Timothy B. Schmit, Tawatha Agee, Carolyn Leonhart, Janice Pendarvis, Catherine Russell, Patti Austin and Valerie Simpson.

==== Horns ====
Horn arrangements have been used on songs from all Steely Dan albums. They typically feature instruments such as trumpets, trombones and saxophones, although they have also used other instruments, such as flutes and clarinets. On their earlier albums Steely Dan featured guest arrangers and on their later albums the arrangement work is credited to Fagen.

==== Composition and chord use ====
Steely Dan use the add 2 chord, a type of added tone chord, which they nicknamed the "mu major". The mu major chord differs from a suspended second (sus2) chord, as suspended chords do not contain the major (or minor) third. In a 1989 interview, Walter Becker explained that the use of the chord developed from trying to enrich the sound of a major chord without making it into a "jazz chord". In the Steely Dan Songbook, Becker and Donald Fagen state that "inversions of the mu major may be formed in the usual manner with one caveat: the voicing of the second and third scale tones, which is the essence of the chord's appeal, should always occur as a whole tone dissonance."

=== Lyricism ===
Steely Dan's lyrics are known for their cryptic nature, often laden with irony and containing cynical or philosophical themes. Much of the band's lyricism contains subtle and encoded references, unusual (and sometimes original) slang expressions, and a wide variety of "word games". The obscure and sometimes teasing lyrics have given rise to considerable efforts by fans to explain the "inner meaning" of certain songs. Jazz is a recurring theme, and there are numerous other film, television and literary references and allusions, such as "Home at Last" (from Aja), which was inspired by Homer's Odyssey.

Lyrical subjects are diverse, but in Becker and Fagen's basic approach, they often create fictional personae that participate in a narrative or situation. The duo have said that in retrospect, most of their albums have a "feel" of either Los Angeles or New York City, the two main cities where Becker and Fagen lived and worked. Characters appear in their songs that evoke these cities, such as in Aja's title track, which in the opinion of Alex Pappademas, co-author of Quantum Criminals, is a personification of Los Angeles. In the song "Everyone's Gone to the Movies", the line "I know you're used to 16 or more, sorry we only have eight" refers not to the count of some article, but to 8 mm film, which was lower quality than 16 mm or larger formats and often used for pornography, underscoring the illicitness of Mr. LaPage's movie parties.

Many of the individuals in the band's lyrics are impulsive people in denial, often characterized as "gentlemen losers". Some have argued that Steely Dan never wrote a genuine love song, instead dealing with personal passion in the guise of a destructive obsession. Many of their songs concern love, but typical of Steely Dan songs is an ironic or disturbing twist in the lyrics that reveals a darker reality. For example, expressed "love" is actually about prostitution ("Pearl of the Quarter," "Babylon Sisters"), incest ("Cousin Dupree"), pornography ("Everyone's Gone to the Movies"), or some other taboo subject.

== Members ==
Original lineup and subsequent members

- Donald Fagen – lead and backing vocals, keyboards (1971–1981, 1993–2024)
- Walter Becker – bass, backing and occasional lead vocals (1971–1981, 1993–2017; his death), guitar (1974–1981, 1993–2017)
- Jeff Baxter – guitar, pedal steel, percussion, backing vocals (1971–1974)
- Denny Dias – guitar, backing vocals (1971–1977), electric sitar (1971–1974)
- Jim Hodder – drums, percussion, backing and occasional lead vocals (1971–1974; died 1990)
- David Palmer – lead and backing vocals (1971–1972)
- Royce Jones – backing and occasional lead vocals, percussion (1973–1974)
- Michael McDonald – keyboards, backing and occasional lead vocals (1974–1980)
- Jeff Porcaro – drums (1974, 1980)

== Discography ==
Studio albums

- Can't Buy a Thrill (1972)
- Countdown to Ecstasy (1973)
- Pretzel Logic (1974)
- Katy Lied (1975)
- The Royal Scam (1976)
- Aja (1977)
- Gaucho (1980)
- Two Against Nature (2000)
- Everything Must Go (2003)

== See also ==
- List of songwriter tandems

== Bibliography ==
- Robustelli, Anthony (2017). Steely Dan FAQ: All that's Left to Know about this Elusive Band. Milwaukee, WI: Backbeat Books. ISBN 9781495025129.
- Sweet, Brian (2000). Steely Dan: Reelin' in the Years. Omnibus Press. p. 93. ISBN 9780711982796.
