= Alive in America =

Live album by Steely Dan
- Released: October 17, 1995
- Recorded: August 19, 1993 – September 19, 1994
- Venues: Various: Desert Sky Pavilion, Phoenix, AZ; Irvine Meadows Amphitheatre, Irvine, CA; ThunderDome, St. Petersburg, FL; Poplar Creek Music Theater, Hoffman Estates, IL; Pine Knob Music Theatre, Clarkston, MI; Blockbuster Pavilion, Charlotte, NC
- Genre: Jazz rock
- Length: 66:36
- Label: Giant
- Producer: Donald Fagen

Steely Dan chronology
Gaucho (1980)	Alive in America (1995)	Two Against Nature (2000)

Professional ratings
Review scores
Source	Rating
AllMusic	2/5 stars
Christgau's Consumer Guide	(2-star Honorable Mention)
Entertainment Weekly	B+
Rolling Stone	2/5 stars

Alive in America is a first live album by the American rock group Steely Dan, released on October 17, 1995.

== Overview ==
The album comprises recordings from their 1993 and 1994 tours, which were the first live Steely Dan performances since 1974. The tour was also supporting Donald Fagen's Kamakiriad album.

Additional live tracks from the tour were later released on the "Cousin Dupree" single.

== Critical reception ==
Writing for The Village Voice in 1995, Carola Dibbell found the album "(naturally) excellent" but, having witnessed most of the featured performances in person, said it "sounded better truly live" while preferring the band's complete studio-album compilation Citizen Steely Dan (1993).

== Track listing ==
All tracks are written by Walter Becker and Donald Fagen, except "Book of Liars" written by Becker.

Alive in America track listing
No.	Title	Recording date and location	Length
1.	"Babylon Sisters"	August 19, 1994 at the ThunderDome, St. Petersburg, FL	6:47
2.	"Green Earrings"	September 10, 1993 at Irvine Meadows Amphitheatre, Irvine, CA	5:20
3.	"Bodhisattva"	August 27, 1994 at Pine Knob Music Theatre, Clarkston, MI	5:47
4.	"Reelin' In the Years"	August 26, 1994 at Poplar Creek Music Theater, Hoffman Estates, IL	6:24
5.	"Josie"	September 18, 1994 at the Desert Sky Pavilion, Phoenix, AZ	6:12
6.	"Book of Liars"	September 6, 1993 at the Desert Sky Pavilion, Phoenix, AZ	4:19
7.	"Peg"	August 27, 1994 at Pine Knob Music Theatre, Clarkston, MI	4:19
8.	"Third World Man"	September 19, 1993 at the Blockbuster Pavilion, Charlotte, NC	6:38
9.	"Kid Charlemagne"	August 27, 1994 at Pine Knob Music Theatre, Clarkston, MI	5:16
10.	"Sign in Stranger"	August 27, 1994 at Pine Knob Music Theatre, Clarkston, MI	6:34
11.	"Aja"	September 16, 1994 at Irvine Meadows Amphitheatre, Irvine, CA	9:00

== Personnel ==
=== Steely Dan ===
- Donald Fagen – lead vocals (1–5, 7–11), Fender Rhodes (2, 4–8, 11), melodica (5), keytar (1, 3, 9, 10)
- Walter Becker – guitar, lead vocals (6)

==== Citizen Steely Dan Orchestra ====
- Warren Bernhardt – piano, Fender Rhodes (1)
- Georg Wadenius – guitar (1, 3–5, 7, 9–11)
- Drew Zingg – guitar (2, 6, 8)
- Tom Barney – bass guitar
- Cornelius Bumpus – tenor saxophone
- Chris Potter – tenor saxophone, alto saxophone
- Bob Sheppard – tenor saxophone, soprano saxophone
- Dennis Chambers – drums (1, 3–5, 7, 9–11)
- Peter Erskine – drums (2, 6, 8)
- Bill Ware – vibraphone, percussion
- Catherine Russell – backing vocals, percussion (3), human whistle (11)
- Diane Garisto – backing vocals, percussion (3)
- Brenda White-King – backing vocals, percussion (3)

=== Technical ===
- Produced by Donald Fagen
- Mixed by Roger Nichols at River Sound (New York, NY)
- Additional engineer – Phil Burnett
- Second engineers – Anthony Gillis and Tony Gonzalez
- Mastered by Scott Hull at Masterdisk (New York, NY)
- Production coordinator – Scott Barkham
- Additional coordination – Scott Kubrin
- Art direction – Carol Bobolts (Red Herring Design)
- Art research – Margot Norton
- Photography – Stephen Cridland, Jacky Sallow, Pete Fogel, and Donald Fagen
- Management – Craig Fruin (HK Management)

== Charts ==
Chart performance for Alive in America
Chart (1995)	Peak position
Dutch Albums (Album Top 100)	74
Swedish Albums (Sverigetopplistan)	41
UK Albums (Official Charts)	62
US Billboard 200	40

Chart (2026)	Peak position
Croatian International Albums (HDU)	32
