= Everything Must Go (Steely Dan album) =

Studio album by Steely Dan
- Released: June 10, 2003
- Recorded: 2001–2003
- Studios: Sear Sound, New York City; Skyline, New York City; River Sound, New York City; Hyperbolic Sound, Maui; Bearsville, Woodstock, New York; mixed at Presence Studios, Weston, Connecticut; mastered at Sony Music
- Genres: Jazz rock; jazz-funk
- Length: 42:12
- Label: Reprise
- Producers: Walter Becker; Donald Fagen

Steely Dan chronology
Plush TV Jazz-Rock Party (2000)	Everything Must Go (2003)	The Definitive Collection (2006)

Singles from Everything Must Go
- 1. "Blues Beach" Released: May 6, 2003

Everything Must Go is the ninth and final studio album by American rock group Steely Dan. It was released on June 10, 2003, by Reprise Records. It was the band's last album with founding member Walter Becker before his death in 2017, after which Fagen would continue the band until 2024 and subsequently retired in 2026.

== Reception ==
=== Critical ===
Professional ratings
Aggregate scores
Source	Rating
Metacritic	71/100
Review scores
Source	Rating
AllMusic	3/5 stars
Blender	4/5 stars
Entertainment Weekly	B+
The Guardian	3/5 stars
Los Angeles Times	3/4 stars
Mojo	4/5 stars
Q	3/5 stars
Rolling Stone	3/5 stars
Uncut	4/5 stars
USA Today	3/4 stars

Upon its release, Everything Must Go received generally favorable reviews from music critics.

In The Guardian, Richard Williams gave the album 3/5 stars, writing: "Unique among contemporary musicians, the post-comeback Steely Dan make records that are more fun to read than to listen to. ... But in all other respects, this new set of songs fails to live up to such assured invention. Thirty years on from their debut, Donald Fagen and Walter Becker have reduced the musical content of their compositions to a series of beautifully machined gestures, virtually devoid of the bright hooks and bold flourishes that gave them such a vital role in the wasteland of the 1970s, and sent fans skipping down the street humming snatches of "Barrytown" or "Deacon Blues". Time spent with the lyric sheet of Everything Must Go will not be wasted, but only the hard-bop horns on "Things I Miss the Most", the slick guitar lick of "Godwhacker" and the laconic strut of "Pixeleen" rise above the mood of well-heeled world-weariness."

For BBC Music, Chris Jones wrote: "Interviews had hinted that the boys had settled on a looser, more blues-based vibe and, sure enough, what we get this time around is a collection of grooves. This works for and against them. Drummer Keith Carlock is so deep in the pocket that he's in danger of being mistaken for spare change. A few nifty time changes really wouldn't go amiss and the relentless search for the funky backbeat often precludes the actual resolution of a hummable tune. Having said all this, there are at least three future classics here and it's still head and shoulders above what most contemporaries are achieving."

In New York, Ethan Brown wrote: "The greatness of Steely Dan lies in their pranks and grooves. ... But Steely Dan’s new album fails at what the band does best. The jokes are oddly, inexplicably stale (on "Green Book," a cashier is described as resembling Jill St. John), and the music is too often a bland boogie. Fagen and Becker have always flirted with fusiony tropes (long, woozy bridges, soft jazz horns), but here the style simply feels affectless. A couple of songs – "The Last Mall," with its refrain of "Last call / to do my shopping / at the last mall," in particular – come close to capturing Steely Dan’s acid wit. But Fagen and Becker don’t take the gags far enough; they’re only half-funny. For a band once so flawless in its sense of humor and its pranks – they offered Rock and Roll Hall of Fame voters Fagen’s childhood piano and a case of honey mustard as an incentive to induct them – Everything Must Go is a profound disappointment. It’s like a Christopher Guest film without the laughs."

During a concert at Los Angeles' Greek Theatre on July 8, 2011, Donald Fagen said that he felt the album was "underrated".

=== Commercial ===
Everything Must Go is the only Steely Dan album not to achieve a Gold certification from the Recording Industry Association of America.

=== Legacy ===
The album is frequently placed last on ranked lists of Steely Dan's albums, with Stereogum music writer Zach Schonfeld writing in 2020 that the album "seems to exist largely to make it easy for fans to identify the bottom rung in their Steely Dan album ranking". Writers for Stereogum, Classic Rock, and Louder each placed the album in ninth place (last place) when ranking Steely Dan's discography from worst to best.

== Releases ==
Everything Must Go was also released as a DVD-audio disc with a multi-channel mix.

A special two-disc edition of Everything Must Go (one CD, one DVD) was released. The DVD, 'Steely Dan Confessions', follows Becker and Fagen touring Las Vegas after hours in a taxi promoting the album in a special version of the cult HBO cable show Taxicab Confessions, hosted by cabbie Rita.

In 2022, Analogue Productions remastered and reissued Everything Must Go on double 45 RPM vinyl and Hybrid Stereo SACD. The remastering was done by Bernie Grundman from the original master tapes.

== Track listing ==
All songs written by Walter Becker and Donald Fagen.

Everything Must Go track listing
No.	Title	Length
1.	"The Last Mall"	3:35
2.	"Things I Miss the Most"	3:58
3.	"Blues Beach"	4:26
4.	"Godwhacker"	4:57
5.	"Slang of Ages"	4:13
6.	"Green Book"	5:54
7.	"Pixeleen"	4:00
8.	"Lunch with Gina"	4:25
9.	"Everything Must Go"	6:44

== Personnel ==
=== Steely Dan ===
- Donald Fagen – lead vocals (all tracks except 5), organ (3, 5–7), synthesizer (5), piano (3), Hohner Clavinet (9), Fender Rhodes (1, 2, 5–7, 9) & Wurlitzer (1, 4, 8), solo synth (4, 6, 8), percussion (6, 9)
- Walter Becker – bass (all tracks), solo guitar (1–4, 6), lead vocals (5), percussion (9)

=== Additional musicians ===
- Ted Baker – piano (1–3, 6, 9), Fender Rhodes (8), Wurlitzer (5)
- Bill Charlap – piano (7), Fender Rhodes (4)
- Jon Herington – guitar (all tracks)
- Hugh McCracken – guitar (all tracks)
- Keith Carlock – drums (all tracks)
- Gordon Gottlieb – percussion (2, 3, 5, 7, 8)
- Ken Hitchcock – clarinet (7)
- Walt Weiskopf – alto saxophone (1), tenor saxophone (2, 5, 7, 9)
- Chris Potter – tenor saxophone (8)
- Roger Rosenberg – baritone saxophone (1, 7)
- Tony Kadleck – trumpet (1)
- Michael Leonhart – trumpet (2, 5, 7, 8)
- Jim Pugh – trombone (1, 7)
- Tawatha Agee – background vocals (4, 5, 9)
- Ada Dyer – background vocals (5)
- Michael Harvey – background vocals (5, 7, 8)
- Carolyn Leonhart – background vocals (2, 3, 5, 6), featured background vocal (7)
- Cindy Mizelle – background vocals (1, 6)
- Catherine Russell – background vocals (1, 4–6)
- Brenda White-King – background vocals (9)

=== Production ===
- Producers: Walter Becker, Donald Fagen
- Engineers: Tom Doherty, Roger Nichols, Dave Russell, Elliot Scheiner
- Assistant engineers: Suzy Barrows, Tom Doherty, Steve Mazur, Keith Nelson, Todd Parker, Matt Scheiner
- Mixing: Elliot Scheiner
- Mixing assistant: Joe Peccerillo
- Mastering: Darcy Proper
- Editing: Larry Alexander
- Arrangers: Walter Becker, Donald Fagen
- Horn arrangements: Donald Fagen
- Technician: Sam Berd
- Drum technician: Art Smith
- Piano tuner: Sam Berd

== Charts ==
Chart performance for Everything Must Go
Chart (2003)	Peak position
Australian Albums (ARIA)	68
Belgian Albums (Ultratop Flanders)	26
Belgian Albums (Ultratop Wallonia)	44
Danish Albums (Hitlisten)	23
Dutch Albums (Album Top 100)	25
Finnish Albums (Suomen virallinen lista)	31
French Albums (SNEP)	132
German Albums (Offizielle Top 100)	29
Irish Albums (IRMA)	33
Italian Albums (FIMI)	33
New Zealand Albums (RMNZ)	40
Norwegian Albums (VG-lista)	5
Swedish Albums (Sverigetopplistan)	11
UK Albums (Official Charts)	21
US Billboard 200	9

Chart performance for Everything Must Go
Chart (2026)	Peak position
Hungarian Physical Albums (MAHASZ)	26
