= Jon Herington =

American guitarist (born 1954)

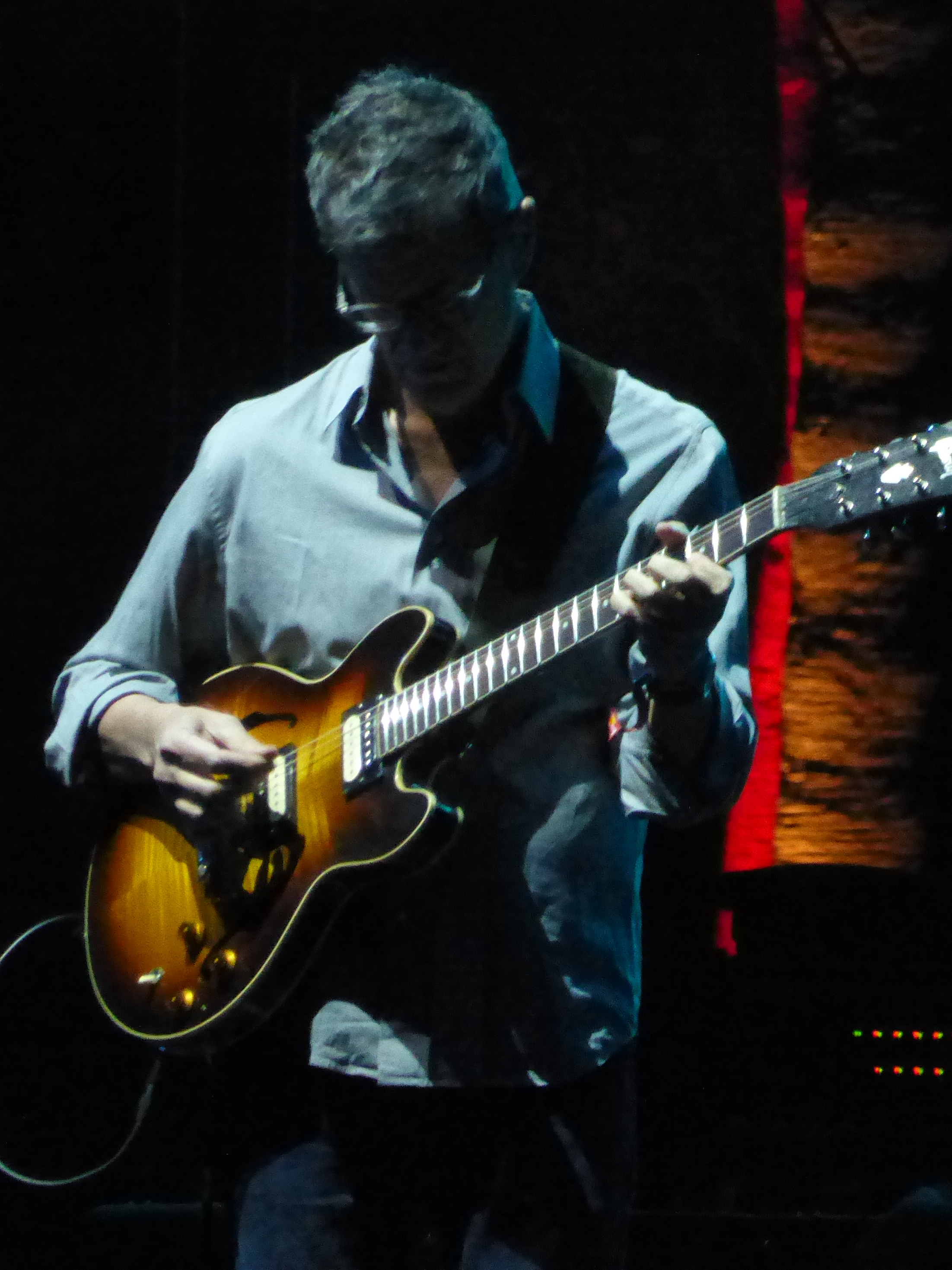
- Herington with Steely Dan in 2015

Background information
- Born: Jonathan Reuel Herington; April 14, 1954 (age 72); Paterson, New Jersey, U.S.
- Genres: Rock, jazz
- Occupation: Musician
- Instrument: Guitar
- Years active: 1985–present
- Website: www.jonherington.com

Jonathan Reuel Herington (born April 14, 1954) is an American guitarist, singer-songwriter, record producer, and session musician.

== Career ==
Herington was born in Paterson, New Jersey, and grew up in West Long Branch, New Jersey on the Jersey Shore. His first band (called Highway) opened for local Bruce Springsteen shows on several occasions. He started playing piano and then saxophone, but began playing guitar when his friends left their guitars at his house as a child. Herington studied guitar with Ted Dunbar while at Rutgers University and also studied privately with Harry Leahey and Dennis Sandole.

In 1999, toward the end of the recording of their 2000 released album Two Against Nature, Donald Fagen and Walter Becker of Steely Dan wanted to hire another rhythm guitar player for some tracks. Ted Baker, a close friend of Herington's, was playing keyboard for the band and Becker and Fagen asked for a recommendation for a guitarist. Baker provided Herington's 1992 album, The Complete Rhyming Dictionary, a collection of Herington original instrumentals, to Becker and Fagen.

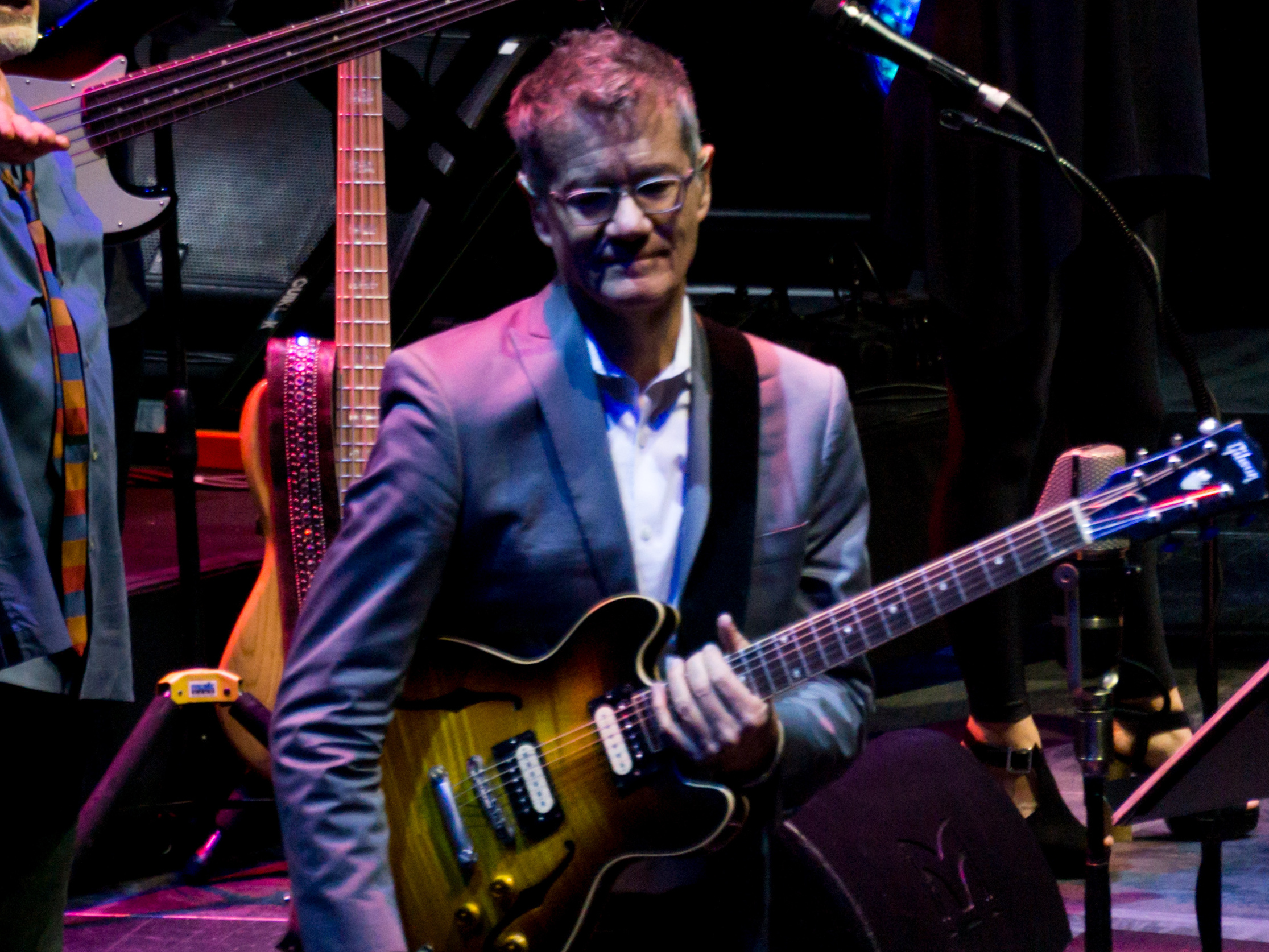
Herington with Steely Dan in 2017

Soon after, Herington got a call to record "Janie Runaway" and toured with Steely Dan to promote the album. In 2000, Herington released a solo album, entitled Like So. In 2003, Steely Dan had him back to record their release, Everything Must Go, as well as to tour in promotion of the album. In 2006, Donald Fagen hired Herington to play on and tour for his solo album Morph the Cat. He appears on Walter Becker's second solo album Circus Money. In 2010 and again in 2012, Jon joined the Dukes of September touring group which is composed of Donald Fagen, Michael McDonald and Boz Scaggs. On June 14, 2012, the band performed on Late Night with Jimmy Fallon to promote their 2012 summer concert tour. Herington also played on Fagen's album Sunken Condos.

Herington plays a Gibson CS-336 and a Fender Telecaster.

== Discography ==
- Like So (Decorator, 2000)
- Pulse and Cadence (ESC, 2008)
- Shine (Shine Shine) (Decorator, 2010)
- Time on My Hands (Wise Axe, 2012)
- (Quiet) (Own Label, 2021)
- (Quiet) Holiday (Own Label, 2022)
- (Quiet) Encore (Own Label, 2023)

=== As sideman ===
With Jim Beard

- Song of the Sun (CTI, 1991)
- Truly (Escapade, 1997)
- Advocate (ESC, 1999)
- Revolutions (Intuition, 2008)

With Lucy Kaplansky

- Every Single Day (Red House, 2001)
- The Red Thread (Red House, 2004)
- Over the Hills (Red House, 2007)

With Steely Dan

- Walter Becker, Circus Money (5 Over 12/Mailboat Records, 2008)
- Donald Fagen, Morph the Cat (Reprise, 2006)
- Donald Fagen, Sunken Condos (Reprise, 2012)
- Donald Fagen, Michael McDonald, Boz Scaggs, Live at Lincoln Center: The Dukes of September (429 Records,2014)
- Steely Dan, Two Against Nature (Giant Records/Reprise, 2000)
- Steely Dan, Everything Must Go (Reprise, 2003)

With others

- The Bacon Brothers, Getting There (Bluxo 1999)
- Victor Bailey, Bottom's Up (Atlantic, 1989)
- Kathleen Battle, So Many Stars (Sony Classical, 1995)
- Bob Berg, Riddles (Stretch, 1994)
- Bob Berg, Virtual Reality (Denon, 1993)
- Taka Boom, Middle of the Night (Mirage 1985)
- Ralph Bowen, Movin' On (Criss Cross, 1992)
- Michael Brecker, Now You See It... Now You Don't (GRP, 1990)
- Randy Brecker, Toe to Toe (MCA, 1990)
- Dennis Chambers, Outbreak (ESC, 2002)
- Eliane Elias, A Long Story (Manhattan, 1991)
- Bill Evans, Escape (Escapade, 1996)
- Bill Evans, Starfish & the Moon (Escapade, 1997)
- Ricky Fante, Rewind (Virgin, 2004)
- Danny Gottlieb, Whirlwind (Atlantic, 1989)
- Nancy Honeytree, Single Heart (Greentree, 1985)
- Michael Leonhart, Slow (Sunnyside, 2002)
- Rob Morsberger, A Periodic Rush of Waves (Hieroglyph, 2009)
- Madeleine Peyroux, Secular Hymns (Impulse!/Verve, 2016)
- Mike Stern, Voices Division One, (Atlantic, 2001)
- Mike Stern, These Times (ESC, 2003)
