= Tom Barney =

American bass guitarist

- Genres: Soul, jazz, R&B, rock, pop
- Occupation: Musician
- Instruments: Bass, upright bass, fretless bass
- Years active: 1977–present

Tom Barney is an American bass guitarist and session/touring musician. Active since the late 1970s, he has recorded with Miles Davis and worked extensively with Steely Dan on the live album Alive in America (1995) and the concert video Two Against Nature: Plush TV Jazz-Rock Party in Hi-Fi Stereo (2000). He is also a long-time member of the orchestra for the Broadway production of The Lion King in New York.

== Career ==
=== Session and touring work ===
Barney began appearing on jazz and pop recordings in the late 1970s and early 1980s and has since amassed extensive sideman credits across genres. In 1983 he recorded with Miles Davis during a period documented by the trumpeter’s official site. He worked extensively with saxophonist David Sanborn during the 1980s and 1990s, including an appearance with guitarist Hiram Bullock and Sanborn at Live Under the Sky 90 in Japan, was in the house band for the Sanborn-hosted NBC music variety show Night Music. A contemporary Los Angeles Times review of a 1989 David Sanborn concert singled out the band led by bassist Tom Barney.

=== Work with Steely Dan ===
Barney was part of Steely Dan’s touring and recording lineup in the 1990s. He is credited on the group’s first live album, Alive in America (1995), recorded on the 1993–1994 tours and appears on the 2000 concert video Two Against Nature: Plush TV Jazz-Rock Party in Hi-Fi Stereo.

=== Broadway and theatre ===
Barney has held the bass chair for the Broadway production of The Lion King; the Internet Broadway Database lists him among the show’s musicians. Reporting from the orchestra pit in 2025 also refers to “bassist Thom (Tom) Barney,” reflecting his long association with the production.

== Selected discography ==
- Steely Dan – Alive in America (Giant, 1995) – bass.
- Steely Dan – Two Against Nature: Plush TV Jazz-Rock Party in Hi-Fi Stereo (Image Entertainment, 2000, DVD/video) – bass.
- Regina Belle – Stay with Me (Columbia, 1989) – bass (select tracks).
- Carnegie Hall Salutes the Jazz Masters: Verve 50th Anniversary (live, 1994; various artists) – house band/ensemble including Tom Barney (bass).
