= Carolyn Leonhart =

American jazz singer (born 1971)

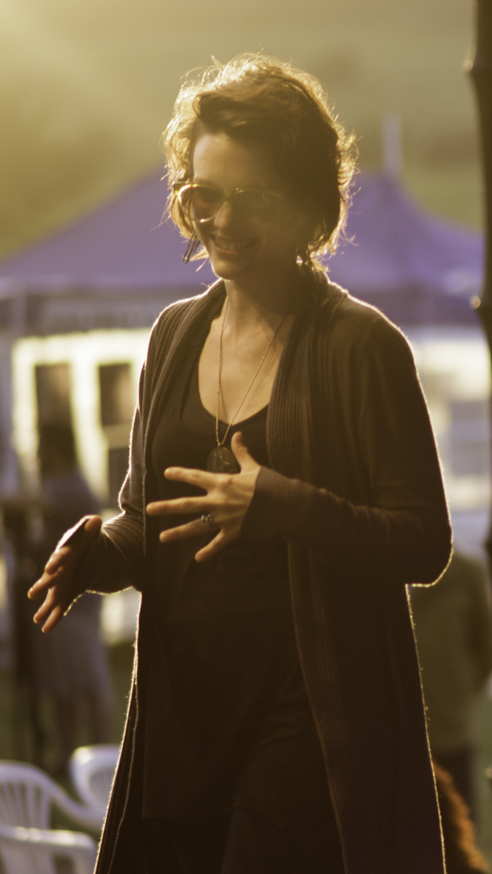
- Leonhart in 2014

Background information
- Born: July 10, 1971 (age 55); New York City
- Genres: Jazz, pop
- Occupation: Singer
- Years active: 1990s–present
- Website: Official site

Carolyn Leonhart (born July 10, 1971) is a jazz singer, daughter of jazz bassist Jay Leonhart, and sister of the trumpeter Michael Leonhart. She has performed as a back-up vocalist for Steely Dan on several tours and recordings.

== Childhood and education ==
Leonhart was born in New York City on 10 July 1971, daughter of bassist and composer Jay Leonhart and vocalist Donna Leonhart. She was exposed to music from a very early age, attending her father's gigs where she saw him accompany famous singers such as Sarah Vaughan, Mel Tormé, and Peggy Lee. She sang on television commercials as a young child. She attended The High School of Music & Art in New York City and for four years sang in the school's gospel choir. While at school, she performed in the TV show It's Showtime at the Apollo. At home she sang while her father and brother played jazz standards. She won the Lena Horne High School Jazz Vocalist competition in her senior year.

Leonhart attended the University of Rochester, obtaining a degree in Comparative Religion. While at the university she remained involved in music, singing with bands at the Eastman School of Music in Rochester. She recorded two solos with the Toshiba EMI label, and in her senior year was named Best College Jazz Vocalist by DownBeat magazine.

== Singing career ==
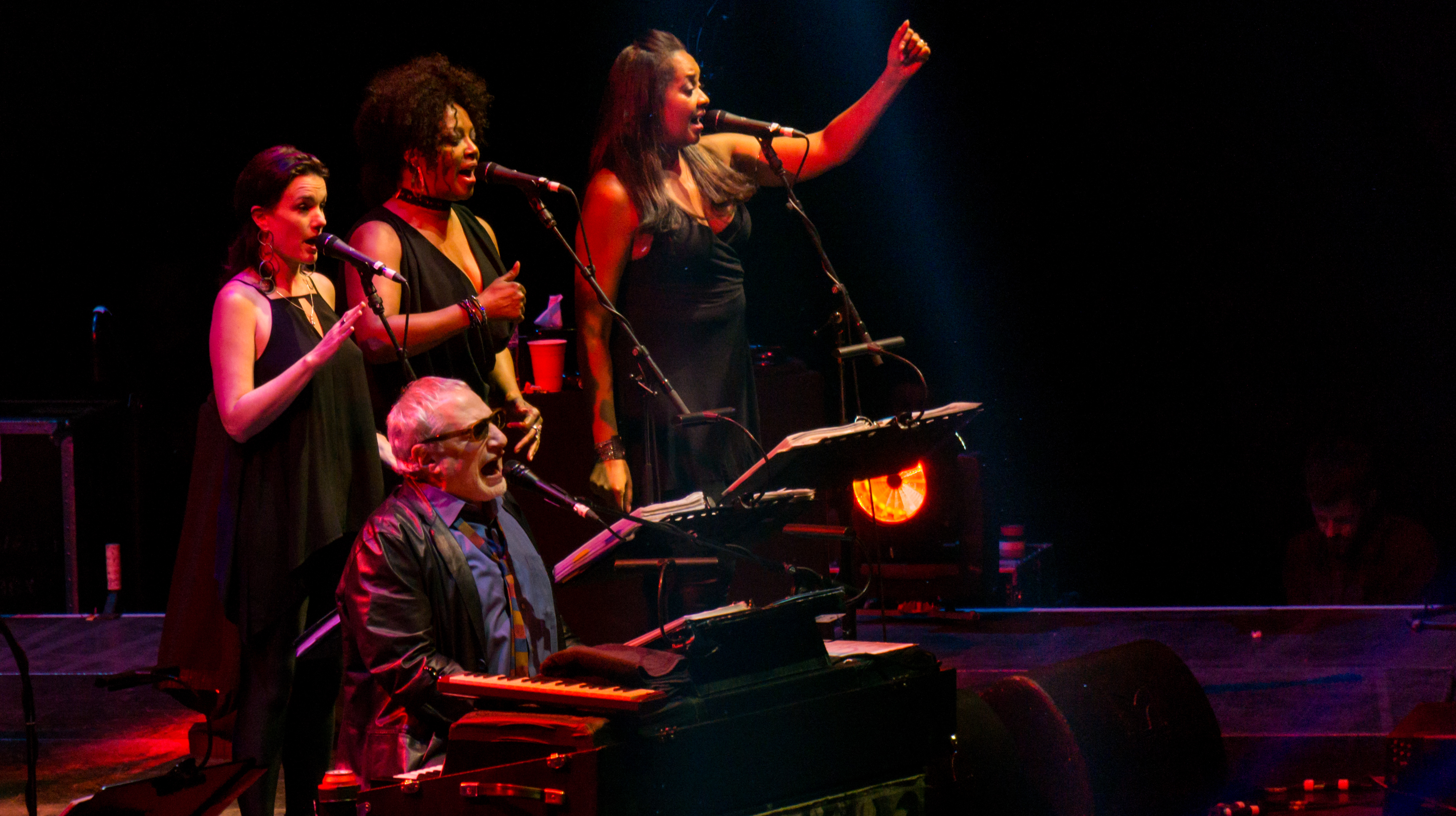
Leonhart (left) with Steely Dan in 2017

Leonhart returned to New York and in 1994 began singing in jazz clubs. That year she competed in the Thelonious Monk International Vocal Jazz Competition, coming in third. A critic said her choice of the songs "Nobody Else but Me" and "Day Dream" was daring, but she needed greater control and more focused delivery.

In the following years Leonhart performed with a variety of musicians, including The Real Live Show, a hip-hop group, and Wax Poetic. The Wax Poetic project combines electronica, trip hop, funk, and jazz. In 1998 she recorded an album with the Swiss Percussion Ensemble, a group of four classical percussionists whose instruments were mainly made of glass. In 2000, Leonhart released the album Steal The Moon, a collaborative project with pianist and composer Rob Bargad. Since then she began performing regularly with her own group at the Smoke jazz club in New York City, at Steamers and The Vic in California, and at other clubs on the east coast.

Leonhart and other members of the Swiss Percussion Ensemble formed Lyn Leon, a group that made several successful tours of Europe and released the album Glass Lounge in Germany in 2004. Lyn Leon toured with the jazz singer Al Jarreau during the fall of 2004. Leonhart said, "Improvising with Al Jarreau was one of the most incredible experiences of my life. It opened me up to another level of creative awareness and expression".

Between 1996 and 2007 Leonhart was a lead back-up vocalist with Steely Dan, singing on three world tours and two albums. She performed again with Steely Dan in 2009 and 2011. She and the group's other female backing vocalists, Cindy Mizelle and La Tanya Hall, are usually spotlighted on the song "Dirty Work".

== Personal life ==
Leonhart met Wayne Escoffery, an American saxophonist, in a New York Jazz club in 2002. The two began dating when they had time during their busy tour schedules. They married in Manhattan on 17 January 2004. As of 2020, they are no longer married.

Leonhart studied Contemporary Commercial Music Vocal Pedagogy Institute at Shenandoah University. She has been an assistant professor at the Berklee College of Music in Boston, Massachusetts, and has taught at the Jazz Academy. Her goal as a teacher is to help vocal students gain an awareness of their instrument, their voice, avoid mistakes and learn better, freer vocal function.

== Style ==
Leonhart has said that she does not consider herself a jazz singer, just a singer, and she has performed with ensembles covering a wide range of musical styles. She was deeply influenced by her father and by Donald Fagen and Walter Becker of Steely Dan. She says that other influences include Wayne Shorter, Woody Shaw, Ahmad Jamal, Herbie Hancock, Miles Davis and John Coltrane.

== Discography ==
- Steal the Moon (Sunnyside, 2000)
- New 8th Day (Sunnyside, 2004)
- If Dreams Come True with Wayne Escoffery (Nagel Heyer, 2006)
- Chances Are (President, 2007)
- Tides of Yesterday with Wayne Escoffery (Savant, 2010)

=== As guest ===
- Steely Dan, Two Against Nature (2000)
- Steely Dan, Everything Must Go (2003)
- Donald Fagen, Morph the Cat (2006)
- Walter Becker, Circus Money (2008)
- Donald Fagen, Sunken Condos (2012)
- Amy Helm, Didn't It Rain (2015)
- Donald Fagen, The Nightfly Live (2021)
- Steely Dan, Northeast Corridor (2021)
