= A Decade of Steely Dan =

Compilation album by Steely Dan
- Released: 1985
- Recorded: 1972–80
- Genres: Jazz rock, soft rock, pop rock
- Length: 66:26
- Label: MCA
- Producers: Walter Becker, Donald Fagen

Steely Dan chronology
| Gold (1982) | A Decade of Steely Dan (1985) | The Very Best of Steely Dan: Reelin' In the Years (1987) |

A Decade of Steely Dan is a compilation album by Steely Dan released in 1985. It was the band's first compilation specifically for the compact disc market and was certified a gold record by the RIAA.

== Overview ==
The album acts as a de facto singles package, including every Top 40 hit enjoyed by the band prior to its release, with the exceptions of "Josie" from 1978 and "Time Out of Mind" from 1981. The remaining six tracks include two additional charting singles "My Old School" and "Kid Charlemagne", a cover of Duke Ellington's "East St. Louis Toodle-Oo", which had been issued as a promotional single, and "Bad Sneakers", which missed the Billboard Hot 100 as a single, and two album tracks, "Bodhisattva" and "Babylon Sisters". The version of "FM (No Static at All)" on this compilation is the original album version from the FM soundtrack.

The CD is currently out of print but the album is available on music streaming and digital download services.

Professional ratings
Review scores
| Source | Rating |
|---|---|
| Allmusic | link |

== Track listing ==
All tracks written by Walter Becker and Donald Fagen except where noted.

| No. | Title | Length |
|---|---|---|
| 1. | "FM (No Static at All)" (from the FM soundtrack, 1978) | 4:50 |
| 2. | "Black Friday" (from Katy Lied, 1975) | 3:33 |
| 3. | "Babylon Sisters" (from Gaucho, 1980) | 5:51 |
| 4. | "Deacon Blues" (from Aja, 1977) | 7:26 |
| 5. | "Bodhisattva" (from Countdown to Ecstasy, 1973) | 5:16 |
| 6. | "Hey Nineteen" (from Gaucho) | 5:06 |
| 7. | "Do It Again" (from Can't Buy a Thrill, 1972) | 5:56 |
| 8. | "Peg" (from Aja) | 3:58 |
| 9. | "Rikki Don't Lose That Number" (from Pretzel Logic, 1974) | 4:30 |
| 10. | "Reelin' In the Years" (from Can't Buy a Thrill) | 4:35 |
| 11. | "East St. Louis Toodle-Oo" (Duke Ellington and Bubber Miley; from Pretzel Logic) | 2:45 |
| 12. | "Kid Charlemagne" (from The Royal Scam, 1976) | 4:38 |
| 13. | "My Old School" (from Countdown to Ecstasy) | 5:46 |
| 14. | "Bad Sneakers" (from Katy Lied) | 3:16 |

== Personnel ==
Taken from the liner notes to the box set Citizen Steely Dan; all individuals other than Fagen may not appear on tracks listed.

- Donald Fagen — vocals, keyboards
- Walter Becker — bass guitar, guitars, backing vocals
- Randy Brecker, Chuck Findley, Slyde Hyde, Lanny Morgan, Lou McCreary, John Rotella, Ernie Watts — brass instruments
- Tom Scott — woodwind instruments, horn arrangements
- Wayne Shorter — saxophones
- Pete Christlieb, Jim Horn, Plas Johnson, Jackie Kelso, Lanny Morgan, Bill Perkins — flutes, saxophones
- Walter Kane, George Marge — bass clarinets
- Victor Feldman — electric piano, percussion
- Paul Griffin, Don Grolnick, Michael Omartian, David Paich — keyboards
- Jeff Baxter, Larry Carlton, Cosmo Creek, Denny Dias, Jay Graydon, Steve Khan, Hugh McCracken, Dean Parks, Elliott Randall, Lee Ritenour — guitars
- Chuck Rainey — bass guitar
- Crusher Bennett, Gary Coleman, Steve Gadd, Jim Gordon, Jim Hodder, Rick Marotta, Jeff Porcaro, Bernard Purdie — drums, percussion
- Patti Austin, Venetta Fields, Frank Floyd, Diva Gray, Gordon Grody, Lani Groves, Patricia Hall, Clydie King, Myrna Matthews, Sherlie Matthews, Michael McDonald, Leslie Miller, David Palmer, Zachary Sanders, Timothy B. Schmit, Toni Wine — backing vocals

Production personnel

- Gary Katz — producer
- Roger Nichols — engineer, mastering
- Bob Ludwig — mastering
- Glenn Meadows — mastering (1996 reissue)
- Jimmie Haskell, Rob Mounsey — horn arrangements
- Johnny Mandel — string arrangements
