= Show Biz Kids =

1973 song performed by Steely Dan

- 1973 German picture sleeve Clockwise from left: Jeff "Skunk" Baxter, Walter Becker, Denny Dias, Donald Fagen, Jim Hodder, David Palmer

Single by Steely Dan

from the album Countdown to Ecstasy
- B-side: "Razor Boy"
- Released: July 1973
- Genre: Rock; jazz fusion
- Length: 3:59
- Label: ABC
- Songwriters: Donald Fagen, Walter Becker
- Producer: Gary Katz

Steely Dan singles chronology
"Reelin' In the Years" (1972)	"Show Biz Kids" (1973)	"My Old School" (1973)

Official audio
- "Show Biz Kids" on YouTube

"Show Biz Kids" is a song composed by Walter Becker and Donald Fagen and performed by Steely Dan. It was the first single from Steely Dan's 1973 album Countdown to Ecstasy, and reached number 61 on the Billboard Hot 100. It was edited for the single release.

The song is based on a four-bar, 30-second-long loop of drums, bass, piano, and a background vocal mantra referring to Las Vegas as "Lost Wages" (an idea borrowed from a Lenny Bruce monologue), upon which the rest of the recording was overdubbed. Rick Derringer's slide guitar part was recorded at Caribou Ranch. It briefly references the earlier Steely Dan song "Reelin' in the Years" following the line "They got the Steely Dan T-shirt".

Among the overdubs on the outro of the song are a rare instance of Becker playing harmonica, and a jumble of voices, including those of Steely Dan road crew members Warren Wallace and John Famular.

Cash Box said that the song has "an infectious chorus delivered a la Nilsson's "Coconut" hit."

The song satirizes contemporary Los Angeles lifestyles. Critic Tom Hull described the album lyrics as "a running paste together joke [...] sufraintelligent, witty and slyly devious", citing as an example the following lyrics from "Show Biz Kids": "They got the booze they need/ All that money can buy/ They got the shapely bods/ They got the Steely Dan T-shirt/ And for the coup-de-gras/ They're outrageous."

A looped sample from the track, featuring the section of lyric "you know they don't give a fuck about anybody else", formed the basis of the Super Furry Animals single "The Man Don't Give a Fuck" in 1996: Fagen initially refused permission for the sample, but subsequently relented. A version of "Show Biz Kids" was recorded by Rickie Lee Jones on her album of cover versions It's Like This, released in 2000.

== Personnel ==
Steely Dan

- Donald Fagen – piano, lead vocals, backing vocals
- Walter Becker – electric bass, harmonica, background vocals
- Jim Hodder – drums, percussion, background vocals

Additional musicians

- Rick Derringer – slide guitar
- Victor Feldman – marimba, percussion
- Sherlie Matthews, Myrna Matthews, Patricia Hall, Royce Jones, James Rolleston – background vocals
- Warren Wallace – spoken word
- John Famular – spoken word
