= Only a Fool Would Say That =

- US b-side vinyl label

Song by Steely Dan

from the album Can't Buy a Thrill
- A-side: "Reelin' In the Years"
- Released: March 1973
- Genre: Samba rock
- Length: 2:57
- Label: ABC
- Songwriter: Donald Fagen • Walter Becker
- Producer: Gary Katz

Official audio
- "Only a Fool Would Say That" on YouTube

"Only a Fool Would Say That" is a song by the American rock band Steely Dan from their 1972 debut album Can't Buy a Thrill, written by Donald Fagen and Walter Becker.

== Composition ==
Steely Dan biographer Anthony Robustelli interpreted "Only a Fool Would Say That" as a depiction of "two disparate characters, one for each verse; the first, a more optimistic hippie-like character, the second a downtrodden working stiff." In the chorus and bridge the narrator, a misanthropic and paranoid character who believes that "Anybody on the street has murder in his eyes", rebukes both the hippie and the working stiff and says their respective dreams are unrealistic.

Another biographer, Jez Rowden, theorized that the song was "a repudiation of the hippy dream of 1968. This is particularly true of the chorus, where talk of 'a world where all is free' is deemed foolish and appears to be a dig at the likes of John Lennon, salad days of kids playing cowboys and Indians turning to the anti-war sentiments of young adulthood at the height of Vietnam, all of this at odds with the 'nine to five' necessity of the working man."

The track ends with a loose Spanish translation of the title, spoken by Jeff "Skunk" Baxter.

== Release ==
"Only a Fool Would Say That" was released in March 1973 as the B-side to the single "Reelin' In the Years".

== Reception ==
Mojo magazine ranked it number 25 in their list of Steely Dan's 30 greatest songs. The British broadcast service BBC called it "quintessential Dan: mellifluous yet mordant, easy on the ear but as caustic as any dissection of the American dream."

== Personnel ==
Steely Dan

- Jeff "Skunk" Baxter – lead electric guitar, spoken Spanish
- Walter Becker – electric bass guitar
- Denny Dias – rhythm electric and acoustic guitars
- Donald Fagen – lead vocal
- Jim Hodder – drums
- David Palmer – backing vocal

Additional personnel

- Victor Feldman – percussion

Production

- Gary Katz – producer
- Roger Nichols – engineer
- Tim Weston – assistant engineer
- Doug Sax – mastering engineer

== Cover versions ==
- The American indie pop band Ivy released a cover version on their 2002 album Guestroom.
