= Reelin' In the Years =

1972 single by Steely Dan

Single by Steely Dan

from the album Can't Buy a Thrill
- B-side: "Only a Fool Would Say That"
- Released: March 1973
- Recorded: August 1972
- Studio: The Village Recorder, Santa Monica, California
- Genre: Jazz rock
- Length: 4:37
- Label: ABC
- Songwriters: Walter Becker, Donald Fagen
- Producer: Gary Katz

Steely Dan singles chronology
"Do It Again" (1972)	"Reelin' In the Years" (1973)	"Show Biz Kids" (1973)

Audio
- "Reelin' In the Years" on YouTube

"Reelin' In the Years" (sometimes titled "Reeling In the Years") is a song by American rock band Steely Dan, released as the second single from their 1972 debut album, Can't Buy a Thrill. It peaked at No. 11 on the US Billboard Hot 100 chart and at No. 15 in Canada.

== Writing and performance ==
"Reelin' In the Years" was written by Donald Fagen and Walter Becker and features Fagen on vocals. As usual for their works, Fagen and Becker have been consistently close-mouthed about the song's meaning and how it was written. However, it is usually interpreted as being about a man whose girlfriend has broken up with him for someone else, and expresses his heartbreak by belittling his ex-lover and putting himself on a pedestal. Some suspect the line "The weekend at the college didn't turn out like you planned" may be an autobiographical reference to the drug bust at Bard College which became the subject of a later Steely Dan song, "My Old School".

Though Steely Dan had ostensibly recruited vocalist David Palmer so that Fagen would not have to sing lead live, even on Steely Dan's first tour Fagen sang lead on "Reelin' in the Years", with the other five members all singing backup.

=== Guitar solo ===
Jeff Baxter was assigned the lead guitar, but after he was unable to play the part to the band's satisfaction, he asked Elliott Randall to give it a try. Randall's guitar solo was recorded in one take, with no edits or punch ins.

Jimmy Page ranked the guitar solo as his favorite solo of all time, and he scored it at 12 out of a possible 10. In 2016 the solo was ranked the 40th best guitar solo of all time by the readers of Guitar World magazine.

The four-channel quadraphonic mix of the recording has extra lead guitar fills not heard in the more common two-channel stereo version.

== Reception ==
On its release in 1973, Billboard said: "Easy sounding guitar solos lead into an easy sounding piano break which supports the voices extolling about culling life's experiences from tears to time." Cash Box called it a "winner highlighted by some expert guitar playing". Record World said that "Another winner from their Can't Buy A Thrill LP should reel in whopping sales." Disc Magazine stated the song "is the most instantly likeable of the package and would make a strong single".

The song peaked at number 11 on the Billboard Hot 100 in May 1973. In March 2005, Q magazine placed the recording at number 95 in its list of the 100 Greatest Guitar Tracks.

In 2017, Rolling Stone described the track as "a prime early example of what would become the Dan's trademark vibe, marrying a sardonic kiss-off to an ex to a bouncy shuffle groove, and adding on some white-hot guitar dazzlement courtesy of Elliott Randall to bring the whole thing home."

In a 2009 interview, Fagen said "It's dumb but effective", and Becker said "It's no fun."

== Charts ==
=== Weekly charts ===
Chart (1973)	Peak position
Australia KMR	62
Canada RPM Top Singles	15
U.S. Billboard Hot 100	11
U.S. Cash Box Top 100	7
US Record World	6

=== Year-end charts ===
Chart (1973)	Rank
Canada	90
U.S. Billboard Hot 100	68
U.S. Cash Box Top 100	87

== Certifications ==
Region	Certification	Certified units/sales
New Zealand (RMNZ)	Platinum	30,000^{‡}
United Kingdom (BPI)	Silver	200,000^{‡}
^{‡} Sales+streaming figures based on certification alone.

== Personnel ==
=== Steely Dan ===
- Donald Fagen – lead and backing vocals, piano
- Denny Dias – rhythm guitar
- Jeff Baxter – rhythm guitar
- Walter Becker – bass
- Jim Hodder – drums

=== Additional personnel ===
- Elliott Randall – lead guitar
- Victor Feldman – tambourine
