= My Old School (song) =

- 1973 British picture sleeve

Single by Steely Dan

from the album Countdown to Ecstasy
- B-side: "Pearl of the Quarter"
- Released: October 1973
- Genre: Rock
- Length: 5:46
- Songwriters: Donald Fagen, Walter Becker
- Producer: Gary Katz

Steely Dan singles chronology
"Show Biz Kids" (1973)	"My Old School" (1973)	"Rikki Don't Lose That Number" (1974)

Music video
- "My Old School" on YouTube

"My Old School" is a song by American rock band Steely Dan. It was released in October 1973, as the second single from their album Countdown to Ecstasy, and reached number 63 on the Billboard Hot 100, a major disappointment after both singles from their previous album, Can't Buy a Thrill, broke the top 20. However, it eventually became an FM radio staple.

== Background and content ==
The song was written by Donald Fagen and Walter Becker and is in the key of G major. Unusual for a song released as a single, the original studio track features four guitar solos. Though at the time Steely Dan had two guitarists, Denny Dias and Jeff Baxter, and frequently used session guitarists as well, all four solos on "My Old School" were played by Baxter. Baxter built the Stratocaster he played on the song himself, cutting the body from a piece of maple, fretting the neck, and winding the pickups. He finished assembling it three hours before the recording session for "My Old School", in the parking lot of Valley Sound, and plugged it directly into the console for the recording.

The song's lyrics tell the story of a May 1969 drug bust at Bard College in Annandale-on-Hudson, New York, referred to in the lyrics as William and Mary, while Becker and Fagen were students there. The song also makes a reference to the Wolverine rail service, which stopped in nearby Rhinecliff, New York. The song recounts how a female acquaintance betrayed them to "Daddy Gee" (G. Gordon Liddy, then a local assistant district attorney).

Contemporary news reports noted that 44 people were arrested in the raid, approximately 10% of the school's enrollment. According to a 2014 Pittsburgh Post-Gazette article, among those arrested was Fagen, whose long hair was cut off at the Poughkeepsie jail. Fagen's landlord, Beau Coggins, accused Fagen of trying to sell him marijuana (a charge Fagen still denies), which led to Walter Becker and Fagen's girlfriend Dorothy White being arrested as well. A contemporary newspaper article mentioned the arrest of "Donald Fagan [sic]" for "the sale of a dangerous drug", with bail set at $5,000. Bard College arranged bail for their current and former students, but Fagen had to call his father in Ohio to arrange bail for White; in the song's lyrics, White's own father is the one who bails her out. Although Fagen's charges were later dismissed, he protested Bard's cooperation with law enforcement by not participating in graduation ceremonies.

The lines "I'm never going back to my old school" and "California tumbles into the sea / That'll be the day I go back to Annandale" refer to Fagen's promise immediately following the incident to never return to Bard College. Fagen reneged on this promise at least twice: first for his graduation, and second to receive an honorary Doctor of Arts degree in 1985.

Though the lead vocal for the song was performed by Fagen on the album, during the supporting tour Baxter usually sang lead instead. Baxter also sang the song when recording it for his 2022 solo album Speed of Heat.

== Reception ==
Cash Box described the song as a "departure from the group’s usual fare, but definitely a track that’s going to have [radio] programmers and listeners buzzing."

In a retrospective review, AllMusic praised the song's chorus and extended instrumental passages, especially the second and third guitar solos.

== Personnel ==
Steely Dan

- Donald Fagen – piano, lead and backing vocals
- Walter Becker – bass guitar
- Denny Dias – rhythm guitar
- Jeff Baxter – lead guitar
- Jim Hodder – drums, percussion

Additional musicians

- Sherlie Matthews, Myrna Matthews, Patricia Hall, Royce Jones – backing vocals
- Ernie Watts – saxophone
- Johnny Rotella – saxophone
- Lanny Morgan – saxophone
- Bill Perkins – saxophone
- Jimmie Haskell – horn arrangement
