= Katy Lied =

Studio album by Steely Dan
- Released: March 24, 1975
- Recorded: November 1974–January 1975
- Studios: ABC, Los Angeles, California
- Genres: Jazz rock; jazz pop
- Length: 35:37
- Label: ABC
- Producer: Gary Katz

Steely Dan chronology
Pretzel Logic (1974)	Katy Lied (1975)	The Royal Scam (1976)

Singles from Katy Lied
- 1. "Black Friday" Released: May 1975; 2. "Bad Sneakers" Released: September 1975

Katy Lied is the fourth studio album by American rock band Steely Dan, released in March 1975, by ABC Records. Reissues have been released by MCA Records due to ABC's acquisition by MCA in 1979. It was the first album Steely Dan made after they stopped touring. Katy Lied is the recording debut of singer/keyboardist/songwriter Michael McDonald, who contributed prominent backing vocals to four songs.

In the United States, the album peaked at number 13 on the Billboard Top LPs & Tape chart, and it has been certified Gold by the Recording Industry Association of America (RIAA). The accompanying singles had relatively little success; "Black Friday" charted at number 37 on the Billboard Hot 100, and "Bad Sneakers", though it has since become the most widely recognized song on the album, failed to enter the Hot 100 at all, peaking at number 103.

== Background and recording ==
The album was the first one recorded by Steely Dan after guitarists Jeff "Skunk" Baxter and Denny Dias and drummer Jim Hodder were dismissed from the group as a result of band leaders Walter Becker and Donald Fagen's decision to stop touring and focus solely on recording with various studio musicians. Becker explained, "We found ourselves in an uncomfortable position with some of our early bandmates of constantly not wanting to do things that they wanted to do. You end up being this sort of un-generous collaborator who's constantly pissing on somebody's parade. In a way, it was very liberating not to have to deal with that afterwards. To be able to say, 'Let's not work for a while,' or 'Let's hire this guy to play the drums.'"

Dias contributed to the album as a session musician, as did singer Michael McDonald and drummer Jeff Porcaro, who were both members of Steely Dan's final touring band. Though the liner notes credit three keyboardists with no delineation of how much each contributed, according to Steely Dan biographer Anthony Robustelli the overwhelming majority of the keyboards were played by Michael Omartian, with Porcaro's frequent collaborator David Paich playing only support parts on a few songs and Fagen playing hardly any keyboards at all. Given the choice of piano for the sessions, Omartian purchased a Bösendorfer for $13,000, to the dismay of ABC executives when they received the bill. Then only 20 years old, Porcaro played drums on every track on the album except "Any World (That I'm Welcome To)", which features session drummer Hal Blaine.

Porcaro became so frustrated trying to play the album's lead single "Black Friday" that at one point he told the producer, Gary Katz, that they should have used Jim Gordon (who played most of the drums on Pretzel Logic) for the album. He experienced even more difficulty with "Your Gold Teeth II". "Your Gold Teeth II" changes time signatures multiple times, from 3/8 to 6/8 to 9/8, and after a full day of working on the song Porcaro still could not get down the swing groove. Rather than get another drummer, as he usually would in such circumstances, Fagen gave Porcaro a copy of a Charles Mingus album with Dannie Richmond on drums which had a song in 6/8 and 9/8. After listening to it for a few days, Porcaro went into the studio and played the part successfully.

The instrumental section which opens "Your Gold Teeth II" is completely unrelated to the rest of the song in feel, melodic content, and origin. It was originally used as the five-minute-long instrumental intro to "Reelin' In the Years" during live shows in 1974.

Phil Woods's saxophone solo on "Doctor Wu" was done in one take.

"Everyone's Gone to the Movies" and "Any World (that I'm Welcome To)" were written before the formation of Steely Dan, with the latter having been offered to both Linda Hoover and Dusty Springfield, neither of whom recorded it.

The last track to be completed was "Daddy Don't Live in That New York City No More". The song was initially more piano-based, but after some rethinking the piano part was dropped entirely. Becker and Dean Parks laid down guitar tracks, with Becker taking two solos and Parks one, but it was felt that a third guitar part was needed. After trying out numerous guitarists and not getting the desired feel, Becker and Fagen requested Larry Carlton, who became a regular collaborator of Steely Dan, on the strength of his work on the Joan Baez album Diamonds & Rust. According to Carlton, he nailed the part so quickly that he was out of the studio within an hour.

One song, "Mr. Sam", was recorded during the sessions but not used. Steely Dan again eschewed the practice of releasing unused album recordings on singles, and both of the album's singles simply reused tracks from the album for their B-sides. There was also a song which Steely Dan started recording during the sessions but did not finish, "Funky Driver"; the unreleased recording includes only drums, bass, and piano.

Becker and Fagen said they were dissatisfied with the album's sound quality because of an equipment malfunction with the then-new dbx noise reduction system. Accounts of how the issue was addressed differ. According to Dias, the original 24-track masters were still in good shape, so they remixed the album using the older Dolby noise-reduction system and produced vastly superior results to their initial attempt, while Becker has asserted that even the original masters were affected by the dbx system.

== Music and lyrics ==
"Black Friday", which features Michael Omartian on piano and David Paich on Hohner electric piano and was released as the first single from the album, relates the story of a crooked speculator who makes his fortune and absconds to Muswellbrook, New South Wales, Australia, as, according to Fagen, "It was the place most far away from LA we could think of." However, locals pronounce it "Musselbrook" (omitting the "w"). Fagen has said that the song is about the Wall Street crash of 1929, but that crash is commonly referred to as "Black Tuesday" or "Black Thursday", and Steely Dan biographer Anthony Robustelli has concluded that the song is more likely about the gold panic of 1869, since the historical details more closely match the lyrics, including the fact that the event is commonly referred to as "Black Friday". Another Steely Dan biographer, Brian Sweet, argued that "there is no evidence to suggest that Becker and Fagen were referring to any particular occasion. They had simply used their collective imaginations to create a fictitious incident."

"Daddy Don't Live in that New York City No More" is a 1960s-style soul tune, with lyrics that tell about a gangster who is run out of town by his rivals. The lyric "He can't get tight every night / pass out on the barroom floor" was inspired by Fagen's Bard College roommate Lonnie Yongue (also a character in the song "The Boston Rag" from Countdown to Ecstasy), who passed out almost every night due to his heavy drug and alcohol use.

Fagen said in a 1977 interview that "Doctor Wu" is about a romantic relationship which comes to an end due to the woman's addiction to drugs, which are personified as Doctor Wu. The lines "All night long / we would sing that stupid song" are a reference to the Pretzel Logic tour (Steely Dan's final tour before becoming a studio-only act). The monitor engineer for the tour, Jim Jacobs, had a habit of incessantly playing Bob Dylan's "Visions of Johanna" through the sound system before shows.

"Everyone's Gone to the Movies" uses a Latin-flavored arrangement and elements of funk. The lyrics are about a lecher who lures underage teenagers into his den and shows them pornographic films.

Robustelli described "Your Gold Teeth II" as "arguably the most 'jazz-like' song Steely Dan ever recorded", with the main rhythm being a John Coltrane-like waltz in multiple time signatures.

According to Becker and Fagen, "Chain Lightning" is about two men attending a fascist rally during Adolf Hitler's rule and, following the guitar solo, furtively revisiting the site 40 years later to reminisce.

The closer, "Throw Back the Little Ones", is a piano-driven song with a backbeat.

== Title and packaging ==
The album's title comes from the lyrics of "Doctor Wu" ("Katy lies / You can see it in her eyes"), and the album cover is a picture of a katydid, a "singing" (stridulating) insect related to crickets and grasshoppers. (Note: However, at the time Katy Lied was released, katydids were usually classified as a type of grasshopper.) Their stridulation is often interpreted as the self-contradicting chant "Katy did, Katy didn't", an obvious link to the title, though Steely Dan have not said whether it inspired the "Doctor Wu" lyric or they drew the connection afterwards. The back cover photograph of Donald Fagen (in reindeer sweater) and Denny Dias (in overalls and sombrero and holding a tank of helium) was taken by Becker during the session (sometime in 1972–73) for their Schlitz beer jingle.

== Critical reception ==
Professional ratings
Review scores
Source	Rating
AllMusic	5/5 stars
Chicago Tribune	3.5/4 stars
Christgau's Record Guide	A−
Encyclopedia of Popular Music	3/5 stars
The Great Rock Discography	8/10
MusicHound Rock	4/5
Pitchfork	9.1/10
The Rolling Stone Album Guide	4.5/5 stars
Select	3/5 medals
Tom Hull – on the Web	A

Reviewing the album in 1975 for The Village Voice, Robert Christgau said that, while Katy Lied might be Steely Dan's "biggest" album to that point, he found it "slightly disappointing" on a musical level, citing the loss of lead guitarist Baxter and what he perceived as "cool, cerebral, one-dimensional" jazz guitar influences. Nonetheless, Christgau admitted that he played the album frequently, and he voted it the third-best album of the year on his ballot for the 1975 Pazz & Jop critics poll, on which it placed sixth. John Mendelsohn was more critical in Rolling Stone, writing that "however immaculately tasteful and intelligent" Steely Dan's music may be in theory, it did not register with him emotionally and remained "exemplarily well-crafted and uncommonly intelligent schlock". Mendelsohn found the lyrics interesting, but inscrutable, the musicianship tasteful and well-performed, but not stimulating, and Fagen's singing unique-sounding, but seemingly passionless. In a review in Rolling Stone from 1977, Cameron Crowe called the album "anonymous, absolutely impeccable swing-pop" with "no cheap displays of human emotion".

Retrospectively, Stephen Thomas Erlewine of AllMusic described the album as "a smoother version of Pretzel Logic" and "another excellent record" by Steely Dan. Travis Elborough wrote in his 2008 book The Long-Player Goodbye: The Album from LP to iPod and Back Again that Katy Lied, while not on par with Pretzel Logic (1974) or Aja (1977), was still "up there as jazz rock staples go". In The Rolling Stone Album Guide (2004), Rob Sheffield said the album completed a trilogy of Steely Dan albums (the other parts being Countdown to Ecstasy (1973) and Pretzel Logic) that is "a rock version of Chinatown, a film noir tour of L.A.'s decadent losers, showbiz kids, and razor boys". Jazz historian Ted Gioia cited the album as an example of Steely Dan "proving that pop-rock could equally benefit from a healthy dose of jazz" during their initial tenure, which coincided with a period when rock musicians frequently experimented with jazz idioms and techniques.

Of lead single "Black Friday", Cash Box said that it contains elements that made earlier Steely Dan singles successful, such as "Hot Fender Rhodes piano tracks, lead guitar work, rhythm that won't stop cooking and identifiable vocals and mix that lets you know Gary Katz has been hard at work on the knobs."

== Track listing ==
All tracks are written by Walter Becker and Donald Fagen.

Side one
No.	Title	Length
1.	"Black Friday"	3:40
2.	"Bad Sneakers"	3:21
3.	"Rose Darling"	3:06
4.	"Daddy Don't Live in that New York City No More"	3:17
5.	"Doctor Wu"	3:56

Side two
No.	Title	Length
6.	"Everyone's Gone to the Movies"	3:46
7.	"Your Gold Teeth II"	4:15
8.	"Chain Lightning"	3:02
9.	"Any World (That I'm Welcome To)"	3:57
10.	"Throw Back the Little Ones"	3:17
Total length:		35:37

== Personnel ==
Steely Dan

- Donald Fagen – lead vocals, keyboards
- Walter Becker – bass guitar, guitar (including solos on 1, 2, 4 ),personnel photos

Additional musicians

- Denny Dias – guitar (including solo on 7), electric sitar (2, 10; uncredited)
- Rick Derringer – guitar (including solo on 8)
- Dean Parks – guitar (including solos on 3, 4)
- Elliott Randall – guitar (including solo on 10)
- Hugh McCracken – guitar
- Larry Carlton – guitar (4)
- Michael Omartian – keyboards (including solos on 6, 8)
- David Paich – keyboards
- Chuck Rainey, Wilton Felder – bass guitar
- Jeff Porcaro – drums (all tracks except 9), dorophone
- Hal Blaine – drums (9)
- Victor Feldman – percussion, vibraphone
- Phil Woods – alto saxophone (solo on 5)
- Jimmie Haskell – horn arrangement (10)
- Michael McDonald – backing vocals (1–3, 9)
- Sherlie Matthews, Carolyn Willis, Myrna Matthews – backing vocals (6)

Production

- Gary Katz – producer
- Roger Nichols – engineer, personnel photos
- Stuart "Dinky" Dawson – sound consultant
- Bob DeAvila – real time analysis
- Rick Collins – mastering
- Dorothy White – cover photo

Reissue

- Vartan – art direction
- Michael Diehl – design
- Daniel Levitin – consultant

== Charts ==
=== Album ===
==== Weekly charts ====
Chart (1975)	Peak position
Australian Albums (Kent Music Report)	28
Canada Top Albums/CDs (RPM)	12
New Zealand Albums (RMNZ)	10
UK Albums (Official Charts)	13
US Billboard Top LPs & Tape	13

Chart (2025–2026)	Peak position
Greek Albums (IFPI)	71
Scottish Albums (Official Charts)	58

==== Year-end charts ====
Chart (1975)	Position
Canada Top Albums/CDs (RPM)	84

=== Singles ===
Year	Single	Catalogue number	Peak position	Chart
1975	"Black Friday" (B-side: "Throw Back the Little Ones")	ABC 12101	37	US Billboard Hot 100
1975	"Bad Sneakers" (B-side: "Chain Lightning")	ABC 12128	103	US Billboard Hot 100

== Bibliography ==
- Robustelli, Anthony (2017). Steely Dan FAQ: All that's Left to Know about this Elusive Band. Milwaukee, WI: Backbeat Books. ISBN 9781495025129.
