= Do It Again (Steely Dan song) =

Single by Steely Dan

from the album Can't Buy a Thrill
- B-side: "Fire in the Hole"
- Released: October 1972
- Recorded: August 1972
- Studio: The Village Recorder, Santa Monica
- Genre: Soft rock; funk rock; jazz rock; Latin jazz
- Length: 4:14 (7" version); 5:56 (album version)
- Label: ABC (US); EMI (Europe)
- Songwriters: Walter Becker; Donald Fagen
- Producer: Gary Katz

Steely Dan singles chronology
"Dallas" (1972)	"Do It Again" (1972)	"Reelin' In the Years" (1973)

Official audio
- "Do It Again" on YouTube

"Do It Again" is a 1972 song composed and performed by American rock band Steely Dan, who released it as a single from their debut studio album Can't Buy a Thrill as its opening track. The single version differed from the album version, shortening the intro and outro and omitting the organ solo.

Released in October 1972, the song debuted on the Billboard Hot 100 on November 18, 1972, and reached number 6 on the US charts in 1973, making it Steely Dan's second highest-charting single.

== Song ==
"Do It Again" features an electric sitar solo by Denny Dias. The "plastic organ" solo by Donald Fagen was performed on a Yamaha YC-30 with a sliding pitch-bending control. The song is written in the key of G minor and has a tempo of 125 beats per minute. It follows a chord progression of Cm-Dm-E♭-Dm7-Gm-Cm-Dm-E♭-Dm.

Fagen sang the lead vocal on the album version of "Do It Again". David Palmer sang lead vocals on a few Steely Dan songs on the band's first album, and was their frontman during live performances. He sang "Do It Again" when the group played The Midnight Special in February 1973.

Cash Box described the song as a "fine commercial effort with plenty of potential as a hit record", going on to say that it "is highlighted by some fine vocal harmony and superb arrangement." Record World called it a "gentle rocker" that "has a bit of the Latin rock sound" and "solid production by Gary Katz."

== Personnel ==
=== Steely Dan ===
- Donald Fagen – lead vocals, electric piano, plastic YC-30 organ
- Jeff "Skunk" Baxter – guitar
- Denny Dias – guitar, electric sitar
- Walter Becker – electric bass
- Jim Hodder – drums, percussion

=== Additional personnel ===
- Victor Feldman – percussion

=== Production ===
- Gary Katz – producer
- Roger Nichols – engineer
- Tim Weston – assistant engineer
- Doug Sax – mastering engineer

== Charts ==
=== Weekly charts ===
Chart (1972–1973)	Peak position
Australia (Kent Music Report)	60
Canada Top Singles (RPM)	6
Germany (GfK)	33
Netherlands (Dutch Top 40)	15
Netherlands (Single Top 100)	10
US Billboard Hot 100	6
US Billboard Easy Listening	34
US Cash Box	7
US Record World	8

Chart (1975)	Peak position
UK Singles (Official Charts)	39

=== Year-end charts ===
Chart (1973)	Rank
Canada Top Singles (RPM)	62
US Billboard Hot 100	73

== Certifications ==
Region	Certification	Certified units/sales
New Zealand (RMNZ)	2× Platinum	60,000^{‡}
United Kingdom (BPI)	Silver	200,000^{‡}
^{‡} Sales+streaming figures based on certification alone.

== Cover versions ==
- In 1983, Italian group Club House released "Do It Again Medley with Billie Jean", a mashup/medley of the track with Michael Jackson's "Billie Jean". The song peaked at number 11 in the UK and No. 79 in Australia.
