= Countdown to Ecstasy =

Studio album by Steely Dan
- Released: July 7, 1973
- Studios: Village Recorder, Los Angeles; Caribou Ranch, Nederland, Colorado
- Genres: Rock; jazz rock; hard rock; pop; experimental; art jazz
- Length: 40:46
- Label: ABC
- Producer: Gary Katz

Steely Dan chronology
Can't Buy a Thrill (1972)	Countdown to Ecstasy (1973)	Pretzel Logic (1974)

Singles from Countdown to Ecstasy
- 1. "Show Biz Kids" Released: July 1973; 2. "My Old School" Released: October 1973

Countdown to Ecstasy is the second studio album by American rock band Steely Dan, released in July 1973 by ABC Records. It was recorded at the Village Recorder in West Los Angeles, California, except for Rick Derringer's slide guitar part for "Show Biz Kids", which was recorded at Caribou Ranch in Nederland, Colorado. After the departure of vocalist David Palmer from Steely Dan, the group recorded the album with Donald Fagen singing lead on every track.

Although the album was a critical success, it failed to generate a hit single in the United States and consequently only charted at number 35 on the Billboard Top LPs & Tape chart, though it was certified gold by the Recording Industry Association of America in 1978. The album has received considerable acclaim from music critics.

== Background and recording ==
During touring for Steely Dan's first album, Can't Buy a Thrill, it was decided that David Palmer was not a suitable lead vocalist for the band, and he was asked to leave. Attempts to replace Palmer were unsuccessful, and so Donald Fagen took on the lead vocalist role.

Recording sessions for Countdown to Ecstasy took place between tour dates, leaving songwriters Fagen and Walter Becker little time to come up with new material. Songs were often assembled at the last minute; "Bodhisattva", the album's opening track, was written by Fagen the night before it was recorded. The circumstances also left such a shortage of material that the eight songs featured on the album were the only ones recorded during the sessions (a ninth, "This All Too Mobile Home", was attempted but not completed).

The instrumental section of "Bodhisattva" uses a four-part saxophone-like section, with all four parts played by Fagen on an ARP Pro Soloist synthesizer. The monophonic ARP could only play one note at a time, meaning that Fagen had to overdub each part individually. The synthesizer was so prone to going out of tune that Fagen had to stop every few notes to retune it before the recording team could again punch in. This was so trying to Fagen's patience that, once the section was finished, he unplugged the synthesizer, threw it down the stairs, and jumped up and down on it. The engineer, Roger Nichols, then brought some alcohol with which they set it on fire. The studio was in the same building as the ABC Dunhill headquarters; when a number of executives came across the wreckage the next morning, they had it framed and mounted with an inscription about "Steely Dan, men, and machines".

Becker wrote most of the verses for "The Boston Rag", while Fagen was the primary writer of the chorus, incorporating guitarist Jeff Baxter's suggestion that he use a chord pattern from Johann Sebastian Bach's Toccata and Fugue in D minor.

According to Jim Hodder, "Your Gold Teeth" was inspired by the time Palmer returned from the dentist with a bridge on; Fagen came up with the song's chorus on the spot.

"My Old School" is lyrically a series of recollections, both real and fictionalized, of Becker and Fagen's experiences at Bard College, centered on an account of a drug raid at the school in May 1969 (ordered by G. Gordon Liddy, who is referred to in the song as "Daddy Gee") in which Becker, Fagen, and Fagen's then-girlfriend Dorothy White were arrested. Baxter built the Stratocaster he played on the song himself, cutting the body from a piece of maple and winding the pickups. He finished assembling it three hours before the recording session for "My Old School", in the parking lot of Valley Sound, and plugged it directly into the mixing console for the recording.

"Pearl of the Quarter" was written before Can't Buy a Thrill and occasionally played on the supporting tour, but was not recorded for that album because it was felt that it did not fit the mood.

Becker and Fagen were both science fiction fans, and were inspired to write "King of the World" after watching the 1962 film Panic in Year Zero!. The radio transmission-like voices in the instrumental section were recorded by Becker lying under the drum kit. Dias's credit on Countdown to Ecstasy for "Stereo Mixmaster General" is an in-joke referring to an incident in the mixing of "King of the World". Dias came up with the idea of mixing each section separately and then splicing the two-track master tape together. He and Nichols worked on this all night and were still there when the next band came in for a 10 a.m. session, but the mix was not used.

== Musical style ==
Like Steely Dan's 1972 debut album Can't Buy a Thrill, Countdown to Ecstasy has a rock sound that exhibits a strong influence from jazz. However, most of the songs are over five minutes long and, apart from the bluesy vamps of "Bodhisattva" and "Show Biz Kids", are subtly textured and feature jazz-inspired interludes. Commenting on the album's style and production, music critic Tom Hull said it is "clean, almost slick", with "no dissonance, no clutter", and reminiscent of 1940s bebop and "overproduced early 60s pop rock". Steely Dan biographer Anthony Robustelli pointed out that Countdown to Ecstasy is the only Steely Dan album where all the songs were written for the band; Can't Buy a Thrill and Pretzel Logic each included several songs written by Becker and Fagen before Steely Dan was conceived, and on their later albums Steely Dan was a studio project with Becker and Fagen as the only members.

Bebop-style jazz soloing is set in the context of a pop song on "Bodhisattva". "Razor Boy" is anchored by a reggae beat. "The Boston Rag" develops from a jazzy song to unrefined playing by the band, including a distorted guitar solo by Baxter. A bebop-style guitar solo is also featured on "Your Gold Teeth", this time in the context of a Latin jazz song. "My Old School" is an uptempo rock song featuring a saxophone section and aggressive piano riffs and guitar solos.

Jim Hodder's drumming on the album eschews rock music for pop and jazz grooves.

== Lyrics and themes ==
Countdown to Ecstasy has similar lyrical themes to Can't Buy a Thrill. It explores topics such as drug abuse, class struggle, and Los Angeles excess. "Your Gold Teeth" follows a jaded female grifter who uses her attractiveness and cunning to take advantage of others, "My Old School" was inspired by a drug bust involving Becker and Fagen while they were students at Bard College, "Pearl of the Quarter" is a love song directed towards a New Orleans prostitute, "King of the World" explores a post-nuclear holocaust Southwestern United States, and "Show Biz Kids" satirizes contemporary Los Angeles lifestyles. Critic Tom Hull described the lyrics as "a running paste together joke [...] sufraintelligent [sic], witty and slyly devious", citing as an example the following lyrics from "Show Biz Kids": "They got the booze they need / All that money can buy / They got the shapely bods / They got the Steely Dan T-shirt / And for the coup de grâce / They're outrageous."

According to Rolling Stone critic Rob Sheffield, Becker and Fagen's lyrics on the album portray America as "one big Las Vegas, with gangsters and gurus hustling for souls to steal." He views it as the first in a trilogy of Steely Dan albums that, along with Pretzel Logic (1974) and Katy Lied (1975), constitutes "a film noir tour of L.A.'s decadent losers, showbiz kids, and razor boys." Erik Adams of The A.V. Club called the album a "dossier of literate lowlifes, the type of character studies that say, 'Why yes, the name Steely Dan is an allusion to a dildo described in Naked Lunch.' These characters hang around the corners of the entire Steely Dan discography, but they come into their own on Countdown to Ecstasy".

Some songs on the album explore more spiritual concerns. The opening song, "Bodhisattva", is a parody of countercultural Orientalism and the idea that the disposal of one's possessions is a prerequisite to enlightenment. Its title refers to Bodhisattva, or people who are of the belief that they have achieved spiritual perfection, but remain in the material world to help others. Fagen summarized the song as: "Lure of East. Hubris of hippies. Quick fix". "Razor Boy" is a bitter, ironic pop song with lyrics that subtly criticize complacency and materialism. According to Ivan Kreilkamp of Spin, in the song "Steely Dan speaks to us from that 'cold and windy day' when the trappings of hipness and sexiness fall away to reveal a lonely figure waiting for a fix. 'Will you still have a song to sing when the razor boy comes and takes your fancy things away?' Fagen asks a generation stupefied by nostalgia and self-involvement". Robustelli considered that the lyrics "can be interpreted as the story of drug addiction, spousal abuse, or simply a tumultuous breakup."

The character "Lonnie" in "The Boston Rag" is Lonnie Yongue, one of Fagen's college roommates; he was later quoted in the song "Daddy Don't Live in that New York City No More" from Katy Lied. "Your Gold Teeth" makes reference to singer Cathy Berberian.

== Title and packaging ==
According to Baxter, Becker and Fagen were planning to write a rock opera about a Marine in which the final song and title track, "Countdown to Ecstasy", would be about his search for female companionship; the opera idea was discarded, but the planned title was kept. American studies scholars Rachel Rubin and Jeffrey Melnick interpreted the title as a joke about attempts to rationalize a state of spirituality. The original cover painting was done by Fagen's then girlfriend, Dorothy White. The president of ABC Records, Jay Lasker, questioned why there were only three figures on the cover when there were five band members, and had her add two figures standing behind the others. The art proofs were subsequently stolen by Becker and Fagen during an argument over the final layout.

== Marketing and sales ==
Countdown to Ecstasy was released in July 1973 by ABC Records in the United States and Probe Records in the United Kingdom. Probe heavily publicized the album, with a series of advertisements on Radio Luxembourg, full-page ads in music magazines, display cards distributed to retailers, and even a Steely Dan Balloon Race at a Radio Luxembourg motor-racing event. Countdown to Ecstasy failed to generate a hit single and was less commercially successful than Can't Buy a Thrill, only charting at number 35 on the Billboard Top LPs & Tape chart. Nonetheless, it spent 34 weeks on the chart and was certified gold by the Recording Industry Association of America (RIAA) in 1978, recognizing the shipment of 500,000 copies in the U.S.

== Critical reception ==
Professional ratings
Review scores
Source	Rating
AllMusic	5/5 stars
Chicago Tribune	3.5/4 stars
Christgau's Record Guide	A
Encyclopedia of Popular Music	4/5 stars
The Great Rock Discography	8/10
MusicHound Rock	3/5
Music Story	4/5 stars
Rolling Stone	5/5 stars
The Rolling Stone Album Guide	5/5 stars
Tom Hull – on the Web	A−

Reviewing the album in August 1973 for Rolling Stone, David Logan said that, while it might follow a "formula", the songs do not become "redundant or superfluous", and that, though the band's "playing is hardly unique and their singing is occasionally hampered by patently ridiculous lyrics, they exhibit a control of the basic rock format that is refreshing and that bodes well for the group's long-term success." Billboard complimented the "studio effect" of the dual guitar playing and found the "grandiloquent vocal blend" catchy. Stereo Review called it a "really excellent album" with "witty and tasteful" arrangements, "winning" performances, "high quality" songs, and a "potent and persuasive" mix of rock, jazz, and pop styles. In Creem, Robert Christgau made reference to "studio-perfect licks that crackle and buzz when you listen hard" and "invariably malicious" vocals that back the group's obscure lyrics, and he named Countdown to Ecstasy the ninth best album of 1973 in his year-end list for Newsday. Tom Hull, in a review published in Overdose in April 1975, said the album is "perhaps the most representative, certainly the best realized," of Steely Dan's albums, as far as their "clean, almost slick" style is concerned, and called the overall effect "strange, strangely comfortable, queasy almost", and the band "a dangerous group, one that should be watched."

In Christgau's Record Guide: Rock Albums of the Seventies (1981), Christgau said that, thanks to Fagen's replacement of Palmer, who Christgau felt did not fit the group, Steely Dan was able to achieve a "deceptively agreeable studio slickness" on the album. Paul Lester described the album in an entry in The Encyclopedia of Albums (1998) as a progression from Can't Buy a Thrill, and wrote that "Becker and Fagen offered cruel critiques of the self-obsessed 'Me' decade", while their "blend of cool jazz and bebop, Brill Building song craft and rock was unparallelled at the time (only Britain's 10cc were creating such intelligent pop in the early Seventies)." Pat Blashill wrote in a review in Rolling Stone in 2003 that the "joy in these excellent songs" and in the band's playing revealed Steely Dan to be "human, not just brainy," "like good stretches of the Stones' Exile on Main St." In The Rolling Stone Album Guide (2004), Rob Sheffield called the album "a thoroughly amazing, hugely influential album" that consisted of "cold-blooded L.A. studio rock tricked out with jazz piano and tough guitar." Stephen Thomas Erlewine of AllMusic found Countdown to Ecstasy to be "riskier" musically than the band's debut album, and called the songs "rich with either musical or lyrical detail that [Steely Dan's] album rock or art rock contemporaries couldn't hope to match." Chris Jones of BBC Music said the ideas on the album are "post-modern" and "erudite", and asserted that the band was "setting a benchmark that few have ever matched."

In his 1999 autobiography A Cure for Gravity, British musician Joe Jackson described Countdown to Ecstasy as a musical revelation for him that bridged the gap between "pure pop" and his jazz-rock and progressive rock influences and influenced his subsequent songwriting.

In 2000, Countdown to Ecstasy was voted number 307 in Colin Larkin's book All Time Top 1000 Albums. The album was also included in the book 1001 Albums You Must Hear Before You Die.

== Tour ==
Steely Dan went on tour to support Countdown to Ecstasy in August 1973, the month after the album's release. However, their live performances were relatively few and far between, with eight shows in August, twelve in September, and two in December, for a total of 22 shows. In addition to the five members of Steely Dan, the touring band included Royce Jones, who played percussion and took over David Palmer's lead vocal roles on "Dirty Work", "Brooklyn (Owes the Charmer Under Me)", and "Change of the Guard", and backing vocalists Gloria Granola and Jenny Soule, who performed under the mononyms Porky and Bucky, respectively.

During a September 2 performance at the Santa Monica Civic Center, Steely Dan played an impromptu cover of "My Boyfriend's Back" with Porky and Bucky singing lead for their encore; the song became an occasional part of their set for the remainder of the tour.

== Track listing ==
All tracks are written by Walter Becker and Donald Fagen.

Side one
No.	Title	Length
1.	"Bodhisattva"	5:16
2.	"Razor Boy"	3:10
3.	"The Boston Rag"	5:40
4.	"Your Gold Teeth"	6:58

Side two
No.	Title	Length
5.	"Show Biz Kids"	5:24
6.	"My Old School"	5:39
7.	"Pearl of the Quarter"	3:43
8.	"King of the World"	4:56
Total length:		40:46

== Personnel ==
Steely Dan

- Denny Dias – electric guitar (including solos on 1, 4, and 8)
- Jeff "Skunk" Baxter – electric and pedal steel guitars (including solos on 1-3, 6, and 7)
- Walter Becker – electric bass guitar, harmonica (5), backing vocals
- Jim Hodder – drums, percussion, backing vocals
- Donald Fagen – acoustic piano, electric piano (including solos on 4), synthesizer, lead vocals

Additional musicians

- Sherlie Matthews (5, 6), Myrna Matthews (5, 6), Patricia Hall (5, 6), David Palmer, Royce Jones, James Rolleston, Michael Fennelly – backing vocals
- Lanny Morgan, Bill Perkins, Ernie Watts, Johnny Rotella – saxophones (6)
- Victor Feldman – vibraphone, marimba, percussion
- Ray Brown – string bass (2)
- Rick Derringer – slide guitar (5)
- Ben Benay – acoustic guitar
- Jimmie Haskell – horn arrangement (6)

Production

- Gary Katz – producer
- Roger Nichols – engineer
- Miss Natalie – assistant engineer
- Dotty of Hollywood – album design
- Ed Caraeff – photography

Reissue

- Walter Becker, Donald Fagen – producers
- Roger Nichols – remastering engineer
- Red Herring Design/NYC – design
- Daniel Levitin – consultant

== Charts ==
=== Album ===
Chart (1973)	Peak position
Canada Top Albums/CDs (RPM)	49
US Billboard Top LPs & Tape	35

=== Singles ===
Year	Single	Catalogue number	Peak position	Chart
1973	"Show Biz Kids" (B-side: "Razor Boy")	ABC 11382	61	US Billboard Hot 100
1973	"My Old School" (B-side: "Pearl of the Quarter")	ABC 11396	63	US Billboard Hot 100

== Bibliography ==
- Chapman, Richard; Clapton, Eric (2000). Guitar: Music, History, Players. Dorling Kindersley. ISBN 0789459639.
- Dimery, Robert; Lydon, Michael (March 23, 2010). 1001 Albums You Must Hear Before You Die. Universe. ISBN 978-0789320742.
- Heatley, Michael; Lester, Paul; Roberts, Chris (August 27, 1998). The Encyclopedia of Albums. Dempsey Parr. ISBN 1840840315.
- Robustelli, Anthony (2017). Steely Dan FAQ: All that's Left to Know about this Elusive Band. Milwaukee, WI: Backbeat Books. ISBN 9781495025129.
- Rubin, Rachel Lee; Melnick, Jeffrey Paul (2007). Immigration And American Popular Culture: An Introduction. NYU Press. ISBN 978-0814775530.
- Sheffield, Rob; et al. (November 2, 2004). Brackett, Nathan; Hoard, Christian (eds.). The New Rolling Stone Album Guide (4th ed.). Simon & Schuster. ISBN 0-7432-0169-8.
- Uslan, Michael; Clark, Dick; Solomon, Bruce (1981). Dick Clark's The First 25 Years of Rock & Roll. Dell Publishing. ISBN 044051763X.
- Valdez, Stephen K. (August 31, 2006). A History of Rock Music (4th ed.). Kendall Hunt Publishing Company. ISBN 0757533795.
