= Dallas (Steely Dan song) =

1972 single by Steely Dan

Single by Steely Dan
- B-side: "Sail the Waterway"
- Released: June 16, 1972
- Recorded: 1972
- Genre: Country
- Length: 3:12
- Label: ABC
- Songwriters: Walter Becker, Donald Fagen

Steely Dan singles chronology
"Dallas" (1972)	"Do It Again" (1972)

"Dallas" is a song written by Walter Becker and Donald Fagen, which was first recorded for the debut single by their band Steely Dan. The record label eventually decided that the song's country feel was too unrepresentative of Steely Dan's sound to be an appropriate introduction to the band, so the single was withdrawn shortly after release, and it has been questioned whether non-promotional copies even exist. Steely Dan later disowned both sides of the single, referring to them as "stinko", and refused to allow them to be re-released. Because of this, apart from the original single "Dallas" has only appeared on overseas releases which were pushed out without Steely Dan's permission, specifically the 1978 Japan-only compilation Steely Dan, a 12-inch single version of "Haitian Divorce", and the 1977 EP "Four Tracks From Steely Dan". The latter two were both released only in the UK and also include the single's B-side, "Sail the Waterway".

"Dallas" was recorded by Poco in 1975 on their Head Over Heels album.

== Background and recording ==
"Dallas" was written by Walter Becker and Donald Fagen in New York, and was originally titled "Bye, Bye, Dallas". They chose to record it for the band they were forming, Steely Dan, because their record label contract stipulated that they had to release a single by the band before they would release an album.

Becker and Fagen had not yet assembled the members of Steely Dan, and they first called their Long Island associate Denny Dias. However, Dias could not afford a plane ticket to California, where Becker and Fagen were, so he had to drive cross country and as a result was unable to make it in time for the recording sessions for the single. Jim Hodder arrived in California with the understanding that he was to be Steely Dan's drummer and backing vocalist, and was taken off-guard when he was handed lead vocal duties for "Dallas". Hodder had served as both drummer and lead vocalist for his previous band, Bead Game, but only because they were unable to find a suitable replacement for their original lead vocalist; however, Steely Dan's producer Gary Katz had also produced Bead Game's album and believed that Hodder had what it took to be a lead singer.

The B-side of the single, "Sail the Waterway", was written by Becker and Fagen for Denny Doherty, but though he recorded a demo of the song he ended up not using it.

== Personnel ==
Credits per Anthony Robustelli.

- Donald Fagen – electric and acoustic pianos, backing vocal
- Walter Becker – bass guitar, tambourine
- Jeff Baxter – acoustic and pedal steel guitars, congas
- Jim Hodder – lead vocal, drums
- Tim Moore – backing vocal
