= Elliott Randall =

American guitarist (born 1947)

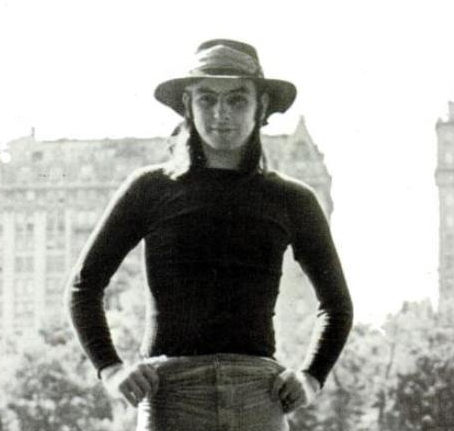
- Randall in 1970

Background information
- Born: June 15, 1947 (age 79)
- Origin: United States
- Genre: Rock
- Occupation: Session musician
- Instrument: Guitar

Elliott Randall (born June 15, 1947) is an American guitarist, best known for being a session musician and performing with popular music artists. Randall played the well-known guitar solos on Steely Dan's song "Reelin' in the Years" and Irene Cara's song "Fame". The former solo was ranked as the 40th best guitar solo of all time by the readers of Guitar World magazine and the eighth best guitar solo by Q4 Music.

== Career ==
Randall began taking piano lessons at age five. At nine, in 1956, he switched to guitar. He attended New York City's High School of Music & Art, where he was classmates with Laura Nyro and Michael Kamen. In 1963, at sixteen, Randall met Richie Havens in Greenwich Village and began gigging. Randall did some early work behind the Capris and the Ronettes, and by 1964 was recording "small-time" demos.

Between 1966 and 1967, he taught music in Lima, Ohio. Returning to New York, he began working as a staff musician for the Musicor record company. During 1968, he recorded with the Druids of Stonehenge with a brief cameo appearance on the Joe Franklin show. He began recording with friends around 1968, including Tim Rose, and made demo recordings with Donald Fagen and Walter Becker—who at the time were with Jay and the Americans. In 1969 he recorded on the album Electric Black Man, featuring Eric Mercury, and toured with the ensemble, which included Bill Lordan on drums, later to perform in the Robin Trower Band and with Sly Stone. In 1969, he joined the band Seatrain, opting for that band rather than joining Wilson Pickett in Muscle Shoals. In 1970, Randall signed with the Robert Stigwood Organization, which managed Cream, The Bee Gees, John Mayall and The Staple Singers. He formed a band called Randall's Island, which recorded a few albums on Polydor.

In 1972, The Stigwood Organization bought the rights to Jesus Christ Superstar and produced the show on Broadway. They hired Randall's band to perform the music. There, Randall met guitarist Vinnie Bell, who was experimenting with various electronic effects. Randall began to dabble in electronics as well, and whenever Bell couldn't make a gig, he recommended Randall.

In 1972, Randall left New York for California. He reunited with Becker, Fagen and childhood friend Jeff 'Skunk' Baxter, and recorded the first Steely Dan album, Can't Buy a Thrill. Randall's guitar work on "Reelin' in the Years" became popular as the song became a chart success, and soon, as the solo gained fame and respect, Randall began getting calls from other artists.

Randall has had a history of turning down permanent gigs, instead favoring session work. He did become a touring member of Sha Na Na in 1974, exiting amicably in 1975. Becker and Fagen asked Randall to become a permanent member of Steely Dan, but Randall politely declined, as he felt that the band's dynamics would make the band dissolve after the third album—which happened. Later, Randall played with Steely Dan on their fourth and fifth albums, Katy Lied (1975) and The Royal Scam (1976). In 1980, John Belushi asked Randall to be musical director for The Blues Brothers, a position he also turned down. Jeff Porcaro and David Paich offered Randall the chance to be a founding member of Toto, and he rejected that too.

As a session player, Randall played with artists such as The Doobie Brothers, Tom Rush, Elkie Brooks, Carly Simon, Carl Wilson, Peter Wolf, Peter Frampton, James Galway, Rochester Philharmonic Orchestra and The American Symphony Orchestra, among many others. He was also a music consultant for the American late-night live television sketch comedy and variety show Saturday Night Live and for American film director, screenwriter and producer Oliver Stone and did projects with music producers Gary Katz, David Kershenbaum, The Tokens, Steve Lillywhite, Eddie Kramer and Jerry Wexler. A full list of artists and producers with whom Randall has recorded can be found at elliott-randall.com.

In addition to artistic projects, Elliott has also played, produced, and composed myriad advertisements (jingles) for television, radio and cinema, for clients including Coca-Cola, PepsiCo, Miller Beer, Budweiser, Cadillac, Ford, McDonald's, Burger King, Wendy's, CitiBank, General Mills, Nabisco, Procter & Gamble, MTV, ESPN, CBS, ABC, BBC-TV and countless others. Since the advent of MIDI in the early 1980s, Randall has worked as independent consultant for a wide range of companies – including Akai, Roland, Korg and Yamaha – in musical instrument and amplifier development, recording and sampling technology, software design, and education.

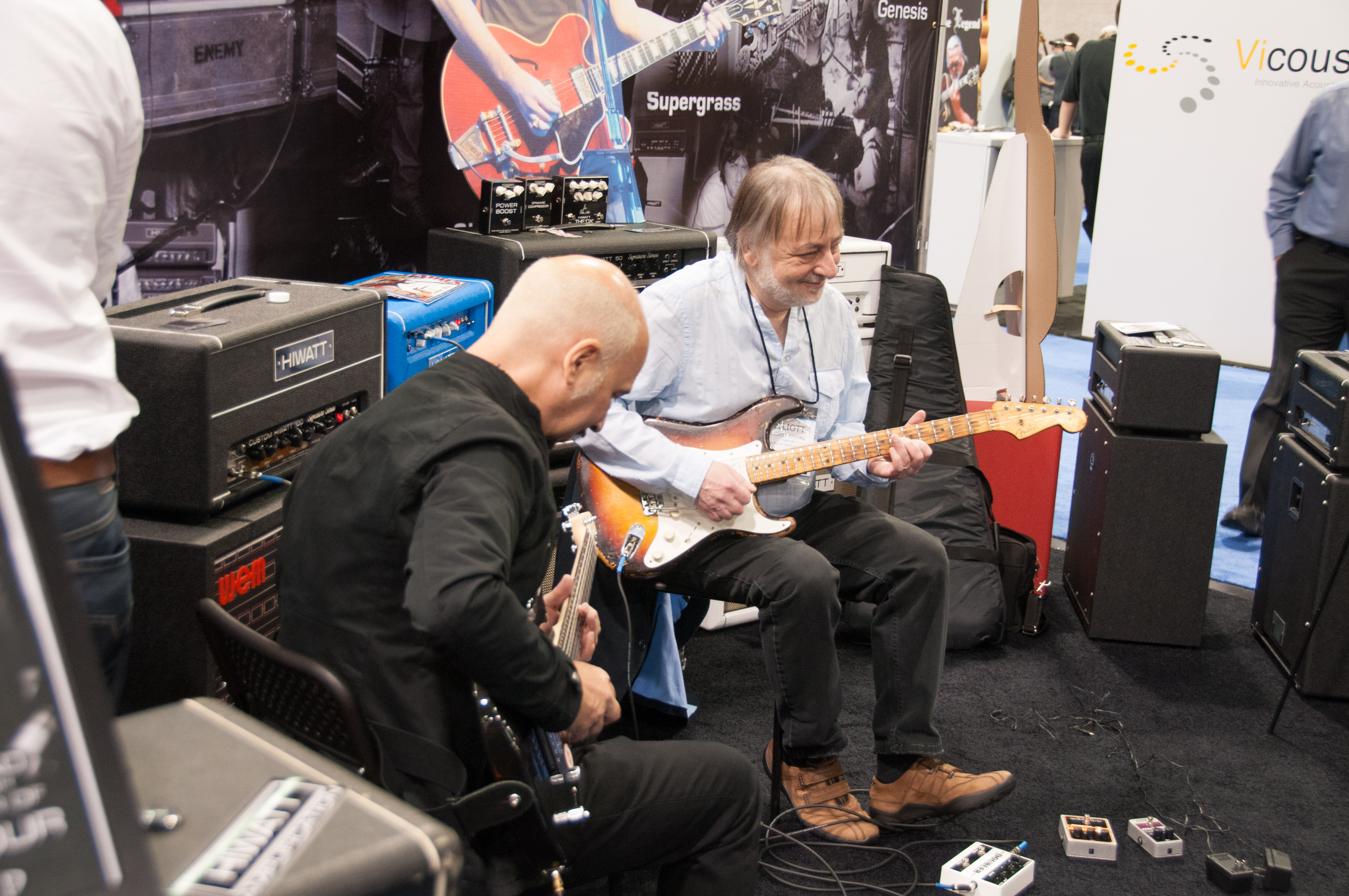
Randall (right) in 2014

Randall's recent projects include recording, production, and consulting on streaming Internet content. He is currently recording a new CD in London, New York and Ireland that blends Celtic, Afro-Cuban and other global musical influences. He recorded and plays with his London-based band Posse and NYC-based Randall's Rangers.

Randall appeared as a guest at London's Hammersmith Apollo on July 1, 2009 with Steely Dan to play lead guitar on "Reelin' in the Years", and did so again at London's SSE Arena on February 25, 2019.

== Gear ==
Randall plays a 1963 Fender Stratocaster. The neck pickup is a 1969 Gibson Humbucker. He often plays through a Fender Super Reverb. He was listed as an endorser for Dimarzio pickups in the company's product brochure circa 1981.

In an article in Guitar Player magazine (July 2007) Randall was asked what rig he used to record the solo on "Reelin' in the Years". He states, "That was my '63 Fender Stratocaster with a PAF humbucker in the neck position, straight into an Ampeg SVT bass amp. The SVT wouldn't have been my first choice for an amp--or even my fifth choice--but it worked a storm on that recording!"

== Discography ==
Eric Mercury "Electric Black Man" 1969 Avco

- Randall's Island (1970) Polydor, catalogue number 2489 004
- Rock 'n' Roll City (1973) Polydor
- Randall's New York (1977) Kirshner
- Still Reelin' (2007) Private Collection Records
- HeartStrings (2011) Private Collection Records
- Virtual Memory (2012) Private Collection Records

=== Soundtracks ===
- The Warriors (1979)
- The Blues Brothers: Music from the Soundtrack (1980)
- Fame (1980)
- Heart of Dixie (1989)
- Looking for an Echo (2000)

=== Also appears on (partial list) ===
- Can't Buy a Thrill (1972) – Steely Dan
- Ladies Love Outlaws (1974) – Tom Rush
- Mixed Bag II (1974) – Richie Havens
- Felix Cavaliere (1974) – Felix Cavaliere
- Katy Lied (1975) – Steely Dan
- Vance 32 (1975) – Kenny Vance
- Destiny (1975) – Felix Cavaliere
- Closeup (1975) – Frankie Valli
- The Royal Scam (1976) – Steely Dan
- Never Gonna Let You Go (1976) – Vicki Sue Robinson
- Tom Snow (1976) – Tom Snow
- Vicki Sue Robinson (1976) – Vicki Sue Robinson
- T Shirt (1976) – Loudon Wainwright III
- Enchantment (1977) – Enchantment
- The Music Man (1977) – Paul Anka
- White Shadows (1977) – Tim Moore
- Blowin' Away (1977) – Joan Baez
- Gene Simmons (album) (1978) – Gene Simmons
- Peter Criss (1978) – Peter Criss
- Shooting Star (1978) – Elkie Brooks
- Connections (1980) – Richie Havens
- Rise Up (1980) – Peter Frampton
- Loveline (1981) – Tavares
- Night Fides Away (1981) – Nils Lofgren
- Eye to Eye (1982) – Eye to Eye
- It's Alright (I See Rainbows) (1982) – Yoko Ono
- Hello Big Man (1983) – Carly Simon
- Youngblood (1983) – Carl Wilson
- Milk and Honey (1984) – John Lennon, Yoko Ono
- The Animals' Christmas (1986) – Art Garfunkel & Amy Grant
- Great Expectations (1992) – Tasmin Archer
- Walk the Dog and Light the Light (1993) – Laura Nyro
- Arena (1996) – Asia
- Salvation (1997) – Alphaville
- Aura (2001) – Asia
- Spirit of Christmas (2009) – Northern Light Orchestra
- Left (2016) – Monkey House

=== Video ===
- On Guitar, Pt. 1 (1992)

=== Books ===
- Foreword of The Artist's Guide to Success in the Music Business, 2nd Edition Loren Weisman (2013)
