= The Royal Scam =

Studio album by Steely Dan
- Released: May 31, 1976
- Recorded: November 1975–March 1976
- Studios: ABC (Los Angeles); A&R (New York City)
- Genres: Jazz rock; funk; hard rock
- Length: 40:56
- Label: ABC
- Producer: Gary Katz

Steely Dan chronology
Katy Lied (1975)	The Royal Scam (1976)	Aja (1977)

Singles from The Royal Scam
- 1. "Kid Charlemagne" Released: May 1976; 2. "The Fez" Released: September 1976 (US); 3. "Haitian Divorce" Released: November 1976 (UK)

The Royal Scam is the fifth studio album by American rock band Steely Dan, released in May 1976 by ABC Records; reissues have been released by MCA Records since ABC's acquisition by the former in 1979. Like all of the band's previous albums, it was produced by Gary Katz. While their previous and succeeding albums focused on jazz rock, The Royal Scam is primarily a funk album. Though neither of its two singles released in the United States broke the Top 40, the album peaked at number 15 on the Billboard Top LPs & Tape chart, and it has been certified Platinum by the Recording Industry Association of America (RIAA). A UK-only single, "Haitian Divorce", is Steely Dan's highest-charting single outside the United States, peaking at number 17, and The Royal Scam reached number 11 on the UK Albums Chart.

The album was remastered and reissued on standard black vinyl, on UHQR vinyl by Acoustic Sounds, and digitally on June 6, 2025.

== Background and recording ==
The recording sessions began in Davlen Sound Studios in North Hollywood, Los Angeles, with engineer Elliot Scheiner, who Steely Dan members Walter Becker and Donald Fagen had met during the recording sessions for the 1970 Jay and the Americans album Capture the Moment. Scheiner convinced them to upgrade from 24-track recording to the Eicosystem, which involved linking together two 16-track recorders to produce 32-track recording. However, two weeks in the studio with a half dozen different lineups of session musicians failed to produce anything Steely Dan were happy with, so they relocated to A & R in New York City, where they laid down half of the backing tracks for the album over two weeks.

The A & R recordings included the backing track for "Kid Charlemagne", which was done in one take (though the dubbed-on guitar solo required multiple takes). The horns for "The Caves of Altamira" were arranged by Becker, Fagen, and the trumpet player Chuck Findley, and Garry Sherman, a veteran in the business, was employed to write the charts. However, Sherman's abrasive and condescending manner led many of the players to dislike him, and one evening he brought a photographer into the studio and requested his picture be taken with Becker and Fagen, which irritated them. At Scheiner's suggestion, they initiated the revenge prank of locking Sherman up in the studio for an entire weekend, but at the last minute they feared this might cause Sherman to have a heart attack (despite his being in his early 40s at the time), so the plan was called off.

Scheiner requested time off from the sessions to fly to Haiti and get a divorce; his lawyer had advised him to divorce before the end of the year for tax purposes, and Haiti was the only place where he could get a divorce so quickly. Becker and Fagen pumped him for details and, upon his return, asked him to recount the trip. With the addition of some fictional elements, this became the basis for the song "Haitian Divorce".

When Scheiner attempted to edit the tapes for the album, he discovered a fatal flaw with the Eicosystem: It was impossible to edit tape when the 16-track recording machines they were using were linked together. Becker, Fagen, and producer Gary Katz held Scheiner responsible for this, so they returned to Los Angeles, where they transferred the 16-track recordings onto 24-track, and told Scheiner he would never work with them again. The recording sessions were completed at ABC Recording Studios, where Steely Dan resumed working with their usual engineer, Roger Nichols.

"The Fez" is one of three Steely Dan songs with a credited writer other than Becker and Fagen, the others being "East St. Louis Toodle-Oo" on Pretzel Logic (1974) and the title song from 1980's Gaucho. Of keyboardist Paul Griffin's contribution to the song, Becker has said that "There is an instrumental melody that Paul started playing in the session, and when we decided to build that melody up to a greater position, since we had some suspicion that perhaps this melody wasn't entirely Paul's invention, we decided to give him composer credit in case later some sort of scandal developed and he would take the brunt of the impact", while Griffin has said that Fagen already had the keyboard riff, and he just took it in a different direction. Fagen later said of Griffin: "There are some musicians who are hacks, and then there are guys like Paul who can create something so different and unique they make the record." Chris Willman described the song in an August 22, 1993, article in Los Angeles Times as "a cheerful ode to the importance of always wearing a condom".

"Green Earrings" was originally over seven minutes long (and thus would have been Steely Dan's longest studio recording to date), but during the mixing it was edited down to four minutes.

"I Got the News" was written during The Royal Scam sessions, before being drastically reworked and recorded for the following Steely Dan album, Aja.

The Royal Scam was even more reliant on session musicians than most Steely Dan albums, with Becker and Fagen playing hardly anything on the album. Larry Carlton emerged as a major collaborator; he played on most of the tracks, wrote charts, and acted as the songwriters' liaison with the studio musicians.

== Music and lyrics ==
In common with other Steely Dan albums, The Royal Scam is littered with cryptic allusions to people and events, both real and fictional. In a BBC interview in 2000, songwriters Walter Becker and Donald Fagen revealed that "Kid Charlemagne" is loosely based on Owsley Stanley, the notorious drug "chef" who was famous for manufacturing hallucinogenic compounds, and that "The Caves of Altamira" is about the loss of innocence, the narrative about a visitor to the Cave of Altamira who registers his astonishment at the prehistoric drawings.

=== Reference to the Eagles ===
"Everything You Did" features the lyric: "Turn up the Eagles, the neighbors are listening." According to Glenn Frey of the Eagles, "Apparently, Walter Becker's girlfriend loved the Eagles, and she played them all the time. I think it drove him nuts. So, the story goes that they were having a fight one day and that was the genesis of the line." Later in 1976, to return the favor (and inspired by Steely Dan's lyrical style), the Eagles included the line "They stab it with their steely knives but they just can't kill the beast" in their song "Hotel California". Frey explained: "We just wanted to allude to Steely Dan rather than mentioning them outright, so 'Dan' got changed to 'knives', which is still, you know, a penile metaphor." (Note: Referring to the fact that Steely Dan was named after a dildo mentioned in William S. Burroughs' novel Naked Lunch.) Given that the two bands shared a manager (Irving Azoff) and the Eagles have proclaimed their admiration for Steely Dan, this was more likely part of a friendly rivalry than a feud. Timothy B. Schmit, who sang backing vocals on The Royal Scam, joined the Eagles in 1977, after being a featured vocalist and bassist with the band Poco.

== Packaging ==
The album's cover features an image of a man in a suit sleeping on a bus stop bench in Boston and dreaming of skyscrapers with monstrous animal heads at the top. Artist Larry Zox originally created the painting of the skyscraper/beast hybrids for an unreleased Van Morrison album, and designer Ed Caraeff suggested superimposing a photograph of a sleeping vagrant taken by Charlie Ganse, his house guest, to make the cover for The Royal Scam. Fagen remarked that the cover had "a rather delightful relation to one of the tunes on the album. Also it had a nice colour. It looked vaguely purple; royal, regal." In the liner notes for the 1999 remastered reissue of the album, Fagen and Becker jokingly called it "the most hideous album cover of the seventies, bar none (excepting perhaps Can't Buy a Thrill)."

== Reception ==
Professional ratings
Review scores
Source	Rating
AllMusic	3.5/5 stars
Chicago Tribune	3/4 stars
Christgau's Record Guide	B
Encyclopedia of Popular Music	4/5 stars
The Great Rock Discography	6/10
MusicHound Rock	3/5
Pitchfork	8.3/10
Q	4/5 stars
Rolling Stone	5/5 stars
The Rolling Stone Album Guide	3/5 stars

Upon its release, the album was not met with as much critical acclaim as its predecessors, with many reviewers finding that it did not show any musical progress. The original Rolling Stone review was more positive, however, and the magazine later gave the album five stars out of five in a Hall of Fame review.

In 2000, the album was voted number 868 in the third edition of Colin Larkin's book All Time Top 1000 Albums.

== Singles ==
- "Kid Charlemagne" spent three weeks on the Billboard Hot 100 chart, reaching a peak position of number 82 in July 1976.
- "The Fez" spent five weeks on the Billboard Hot 100, peaking at number 59 in October 1976.
- "Haitian Divorce" spent nine weeks on the UK Singles Chart, peaking at number 17 in January 1977.

== Track listing ==
All tracks are written by Walter Becker and Donald Fagen, except where noted.

Side one
No.	Title	Writer(s)	Solo(s)	Length
1.	"Kid Charlemagne"		guitar: Larry Carlton	4:34
2.	"The Caves of Altamira"		tenor saxophone: John Klemmer	3:31
3.	"Don't Take Me Alive"		guitar: Larry Carlton	4:13
4.	"Sign In Stranger"		piano: Paul Griffin; guitar: Elliott Randall	4:21
5.	"The Fez"	Becker, Fagen, Paul Griffin	guitar: Walter Becker	3:56

Side two
No.	Title	Solo(s)	Length
6.	"Green Earrings"	guitar: Denny Dias (1st) and Elliott Randall (2nd and outro)	4:06
7.	"Haitian Divorce"	talk box guitar: Dean Parks (altered by Walter Becker)	5:47
8.	"Everything You Did"	guitar: Larry Carlton	3:57
9.	"The Royal Scam"	None	6:31
Total length:			40:56

== Personnel ==
Steely Dan

- Donald Fagen – lead and background vocals, keyboards, horn arrangements
- Walter Becker – guitar, bass guitar, horn arrangements

Additional musicians

- Paul Griffin – keyboards
- Don Grolnick – keyboards
- Larry Carlton – guitar
- Denny Dias – guitar
- Dean Parks – guitar
- Elliott Randall – guitar
- Chuck Rainey – bass guitar
- Rick Marotta – drums (3, 8)
- Bernard Purdie – drums (all tracks except 3, 8)
- Gary Coleman – percussion
- Victor Feldman – percussion, keyboards
- Chuck Findley – trumpet, horn arrangements
- Bob Findley – trumpet
- Dick "Slyde" Hyde – trombone
- Jim Horn – saxophone
- Plas Johnson – saxophone
- John Klemmer – saxophone
- Venetta Fields – backing vocals
- Clydie King – backing vocals
- Sherlie Matthews – backing vocals
- Michael McDonald – backing vocals
- Timothy B. Schmit – backing vocals

Production

- Gary Katz – producer
- Roger Nichols – engineer, mixing engineer
- Elliot Scheiner – engineer
- Barney Perkins – mixing engineer
- Brian Gardner – mastering engineer
- Stuart "Dinky" Dawson – sound consultant
- Karen Stanley – nurse
- Ed Caraeff – art direction and design
- Charlie Ganse – cover art
- Zox – cover art
- Tom Nikosey – typographic design
- Garry Sherman – special thanks (charts)

Reissue

- Roger Nichols – remastering engineer
- Beth Stempel – coordinator
- Vartan – art direction
- Mike Diehl – design
- Daniel Levitin – consultant

== Charts ==
=== Weekly charts ===
Chart (1976)	Peak position
Australian Albums (Kent Music Report)	30
Canada Top Albums/CDs (RPM)	24
Dutch Albums (Album Top 100)	14
New Zealand Albums (RMNZ)	3
UK Albums (Official Charts)	11
US Billboard 200	15

=== Year-end charts ===
Chart (1976)	Position
New Zealand Albums (RMNZ)	32
US Billboard 200	70

== Certifications ==
Region	Certification	Certified units/sales
Canada (Music Canada)	Gold	50,000^{^}
United Kingdom (BPI)	Silver	60,000^{‡}
United States (RIAA)	Platinum	1,000,000^{^}
^{^} Shipments figures based on certification alone.^{‡} Sales+streaming figures based on certification alone.

== Bibliography ==
- Robustelli, Anthony (2017). Steely Dan FAQ: All that's Left to Know about this Elusive Band. Milwaukee, WI: Backbeat Books. ISBN 9781495025129.
- Sweet, Brian (2018). Steely Dan: Reelin' in the Years. Omnibus Press. ISBN 978-1787600638.
