= Can't Buy a Thrill =

Studio album by Steely Dan
- Released: November 1972
- Recorded: August 1972
- Studios: Village Recorder, Los Angeles, California
- Genres: Jazz rock; pop rock; soft rock
- Length: 41:04
- Label: ABC
- Producer: Gary Katz

Steely Dan chronology
Can't Buy a Thrill (1972)	Countdown to Ecstasy (1973)

Singles from Can't Buy a Thrill
- 1. "Do It Again" Released: November 1972; 2. "Reelin' In the Years" Released: March 1973

Can't Buy a Thrill is the debut studio album by American rock band Steely Dan, released in November 1972, by ABC Records. It was written by band members Walter Becker and Donald Fagen, and recorded in August 1972 at the Village Recorder in Los Angeles with producer Gary Katz. The album is one of Steely Dan's most stylistically eclectic, encompassing the sounds of soft rock, pop rock and jazz rock, alongside philosophical, elliptical lyrics.

A commercial success, Can't Buy a Thrill peaked at number 17 on the US Billboard Top LPs & Tape chart, bolstered by the popular singles "Do It Again" and "Reelin' In the Years", and was eventually certified platinum by the Recording Industry Association of America (RIAA). It was also met with positive reviews and has appeared on many retrospective "greatest albums" lists, including Rolling Stone magazine's "500 Greatest Albums of All Time" (2003).

== Background and recording ==
After Steely Dan's debut single "Dallas" was withdrawn due to being unrepresentative of their style, ABC Records executives decided to proceed with recording sessions for their first album. The sessions were scheduled for the summer of 1972, but Steely Dan postponed them until engineer Roger Nichols could return from his summer vacation, as they considered him a key part of the project. This annoyed ABC Dunhill's president, Jay Lasker, but A&R man Steve Barri convinced Lasker that Steely Dan were worth the time and expense.

Steely Dan recorded the album in August 1972 at the Village Recorder in Los Angeles. All of the songs were written by Walter Becker and Donald Fagen, Steely Dan's bassist and keyboardist respectively; the liner notes identify "Do It Again" as a traditional song, but this is a fabrication. When the sessions began, Steely Dan was a five-person band, with Fagen handling most of the lead vocals. Though drummer Jim Hodder had never seen himself as a lead singer, he was excited by the song "Midnite Cruiser" (sometimes spelled "Midnight Cruiser") and offered to sing lead on it, an idea to which Becker and Fagen were immediately receptive.

For material, Becker and Fagen used a combination of new songs written specifically for Steely Dan and older songs they had written before moving to Los Angeles; the older songs include "Midnite Cruiser", "Fire in the Hole", and "Brooklyn (Owes the Charmer Under Me)". Comparison with a demo recording of "Brooklyn (Owes the Charmer Under Me)" reveals that the album rendition omits verse two and uses guitar for an intro that was originally played on organ.

Four songs recorded during the sessions were left off Can't Buy a Thrill: "Running Child", "Sacajawea", "Megashine City (Talkin' About My Home)", and "Gullywater". Though it was common practice to include leftover songs from album sessions on the B-side of the album's singles, none of these recordings were included on any release, and the single B-sides simply reused tracks which appeared on the album. However, "Running Child" was covered by Christopher Kearney on his 1975 album Sweet Water.

During the recording sessions, ABC executives started discussing touring to support the album, which shocked Becker and Fagen, who had assumed Steely Dan could be a studio-only band. Fagen in particular expressed terror over the prospect of singing lead live, and though the rest of the band felt that Fagen had the right personality for the songs, they also recognized the potential of recruiting a singer with a wider vocal range than Fagen. For these reasons, against the objections of producer Gary Katz, David Palmer was recruited to Steely Dan as their lead vocalist. Palmer arrived at the studio a week after he received the offer, and though most of the album had already been recorded at this point, he was able to sing lead on two songs, "Dirty Work" and "Brooklyn (Owes the Charmer Under Me)", and dub secondary vocals onto several others.

== Music and lyrics ==
According to writers Marjorie Galen and Gordon Matthews, Can't Buy a Thrill features an upbeat soft rock style. Music journalist Paul Lester said it incorporates mambo, swing, jazz, and Latin musical elements. Music critic Stephen Thomas Erlewine noted that "there are very few of the jazz flourishes that came to distinguish their [later] albums", but added that the first single from the album, "Do It Again", incorporates a tight Latin jazz beat, while the second single, "Reelin' In the Years", features jazzy guitar solos and harmonies. Steely Dan biographer Anthony Robustelli echoed Erlewine's analysis, saying Can't Buy a Thrill "is arguably their most rock 'n' roll album, and while the songs hint at their jazz leanings, it is the work of a band still trying to find itself. The songs are eclectic, with Latin-flavored rhythms, all-out rockers, ballads, and bluesy workouts ..."

Robert Christgau described "Do It Again" as a toned-down mambo song with "tragic" lyrics about a "compulsive" loser. Robustelli observed that it is one of the simplest Steely Dan songs harmonically, "with only five chords that all fall within one key".

"Dirty Work" is the only track on the album to include horn instruments, and introduces a recurring Steely Dan technique, the use of a chord which breaks from the key of the song.

The lyrics of "Kings" are about the death of King Richard I of England and the political turmoil that followed before his brother John ascended the throne. Elliott Randall has said that his guitar solo on the track was inspired by his emotions over the recent breakup of his first marriage.

"Fire in the Hole", which features "angry, strident piano" by Fagen, takes its title from a phrase used by American soldiers in Vietnam, and alludes to the many students who evaded the draft in the late 1960s and early 1970s (Becker and Fagen included). Robustelli described the song as "harmonically elaborate", with multiple changes in key.

"Brooklyn (Owes the Charmer Under Me)" was written about "President Street Pete", the tenant who lived under Fagen's apartment in Park Slope, Brooklyn, New York, and what Fagen and Becker imagined he was owed for, in Becker's words, "the indignities that they suffered living in Brooklyn, sitting on the stoop and just shooting the shit about the Mets and that kind of thing for 20 years", which includes money, lavish hotel rooms, Hollywood starlets, and gambling prowess.

"Turn that Heartbeat Over Again" is an extended form piece with disparate sections and multiple key changes. In a 1973 interview Denny Dias said that "Turn that Heartbeat Over Again" and "Fire in the Hole" were his two favorite songs on Can't Buy a Thrill because they were more "sophisticated" than the others, an opinion he held to in a 2025 interview.

== Title and packaging ==
Music historians generally agree that the title of the album is a reference to the opening lines of the Bob Dylan song "It Takes a Lot to Laugh, It Takes a Train to Cry", though Donald Fagen has said the title came from a comment Walter Becker made in a conversation with him: "You can't buy a thrill in California."

The original idea for the album cover was a photo of a young girl looking into a pornography shop as the owner leers at her from inside, but though the photo shoot was held, this idea was eventually rejected. Steely Dan's second choice for the cover was a still from Irma la Douce (a 1963 film about a prostitute), but they were unable to navigate the copyright issues. The third attempt was a photomontage by Robert Lockart. It includes images of muscle-men and a line of prostitutes (standing in Rue du Gros-Horloge in Rouen, France). The band members immediately disliked it, but there was not enough time left to try out yet another cover idea, so the Lockart collage was chosen for lack of a better alternative. In the liner notes to a reissue of The Royal Scam (1976), Becker and Fagen said that The Royal Scam possessed "the most hideous album cover of the seventies, bar none except perhaps Can't Buy a Thrill." The cover was banned in Francoist Spain and replaced by a photograph of the band playing in concert.

== Release ==
Can't Buy a Thrill was released in the United States by ABC Records in November 1972, and in the United Kingdom by Probe Records in January 1973. The album was released in a two-channel stereo mix, as well as in a four-channel quadraphonic mix.

The album peaked at number 17 on the Billboard Top LPs & Tape chart, and Dunhill Records reissued the album in the U.S. on August 22, 1973. On May 31, 1973, Can't Buy a Thrill was certified Gold by the Recording Industry Association of America (RIAA), recognizing the shipment of 500,000 copies in the U.S.; it was certified Platinum on September 7, 1993, recognizing the shipment of 1,000,000 copies.

== Critical reception ==
Retrospective professional reviews
Review scores
Source	Rating
AllMusic	4.5/5 stars
Chicago Tribune	3.5/4 stars
Christgau's Record Guide	A
The Encyclopedia of Popular Music	5/5 stars
The Great Rock Discography	8/10
Music Story	4.5/5 stars
MusicHound Rock	5/5 stars
Pitchfork	8.6/10
The Rolling Stone Album Guide	4/5 stars

Reviewing the album in November 1972 for Rolling Stone, James Isaacs said Can't Buy a Thrill is "distinguished by three top-level cuts and scattered moments of inspiration," but felt the band occasionally sounded "limp". In his review for Creem, Robert Christgau deemed the package "A hit single with a good album attached", and said he found the lyrics "oblique, even philosophical [...] as befit a band named after a dildo in a William Burroughs novel." (Note: The novel is Burroughs' Naked Lunch (1959). Becker and Fagen were fans of Beat Generation literature.) In Christgau's Record Guide: Rock Albums of the Seventies (1981), Christgau expounded on his original praise, writing: "Think of the Dan as the first post-boogie band: the beat swings more than it blasts or blisters, the chord changes defy our primitive subconscious expectations, and the lyrics underline their own difficulty—as well as the difficulty of the reality to which they refer—with arbitrary personal allusions, most of which are ruses."

In a retrospective review for BBC Music, Paul Lester said the album is so "fully-formed [...] that you would scarcely believe that it's their debut", and contains "tightly constructed songs with dazzling hooks, clever, cryptic lyrics, and vocals that offer teasing critiques for those that want them." Writing for AllMusic, Stephen Thomas Erlewine said the songs on the album "subvert traditional conventions" and are "tightly constructed, with interlocking chords and gracefully interwoven melodies, buoyed by clever, cryptic lyrics", but criticized the contributions of vocalist David Palmer, writing that he "oversings the handful of tracks where he takes the lead", which caused Becker and Fagen to temper "their wildest impulses with mainstream pop techniques." In a review included in The Rolling Stone Album Guide (2004), Rob Sheffield was somewhat less impressed by the album, calling it "mellow folk rock" that was "softened" by Palmer, who "sounds like he's nervous about where his wallet is".

Can't Buy a Thrill has appeared on retrospective "greatest albums" lists. In 2000, it was voted number 207 in Colin Larkin's book All Time Top 1000 Albums. In 2003, it was ranked number 238 on Rolling Stone's list of the "500 Greatest Albums of All Time"; it was number 240 on the 2012 update of the list, and number 168 on the 2020 version. The album was also included in the book 1001 Albums You Must Hear Before You Die.

== Tour ==
Steely Dan's tour to promote Can't Buy a Thrill started in October 1972, and ended with a show in Atlanta, Georgia on May 27, 1973. Because Can't Buy a Thrill and its first single, "Do It Again", were not released until November 1972, and Steely Dan's first single, "Dallas", was withdrawn shortly after release, the audiences consisted mostly of people who had never heard Steely Dan's music before. In addition to songs from Can't Buy a Thrill, the set lists included songs that were written specifically to showcase David Palmer's vocals and were never released on any Steely Dan album, among them "Megashine City (Talkin' About My Home)", "Take My Money", and "Hellbound Train".

== Track listing ==
All tracks are written by Walter Becker and Donald Fagen.

Side one
No.	Title	Lead vocals	Length
1.	"Do It Again"	Fagen	5:57
2.	"Dirty Work"	David Palmer	3:09
3.	"Kings"	Fagen	3:47
4.	"Midnite Cruiser"	Jim Hodder	4:12
5.	"Only a Fool Would Say That"	Fagen (Note: The album's liner notes say "Vocal by Donald Fagen and David Palmer", but the Steely Dan biographer Anthony Robustelli clarifies that Palmer only did background vocals on "Only a Fool Would Say That".)	2:55

Side two
No.	Title	Lead vocals	Length
6.	"Reelin' In the Years"	Fagen	4:37
7.	"Fire in the Hole"	Fagen	3:29
8.	"Brooklyn (Owes the Charmer Under Me)"	Palmer	4:21
9.	"Change of the Guard"	Fagen and Palmer	3:39
10.	"Turn That Heartbeat Over Again"	Fagen, Palmer, and Becker	4:58
Total length:			41:04

== Personnel ==
Steely Dan

- Donald Fagen – piano, electric piano, plastic organ, vocals
- Walter Becker – electric bass guitar, vocals
- Jeff "Skunk" Baxter – electric and pedal steel guitars, spoken word (5)
- Denny Dias – guitar, electric sitar
- Jim Hodder – drums, percussion, vocals
- David Palmer – vocals

Additional musicians

- Elliott Randall – lead guitar (3, 6)
- Victor Feldman – percussion
- Jerome Richardson – tenor saxophone (2)
- Snooky Young – flugelhorn (2)
- Clydie King, Sherlie Matthews, and Venetta Fields – backing vocals (3, 8)

Technical

- Produced by Gary Katz
- Engineered by Roger Nichols (The Immortal)
- Assistant engineer – Tim Weston (The Stafford boy)
- Mastered by Doug Sax
- Cover design – Robert Lockart
- Liner notes – Tristan Fabriani (pseudonym for Walter Becker and Donald Fagen)

Reissue

- Produced by Walter Becker and Donald Fagen
- Remastering engineer – Roger Nichols
- Art direction – Vartan
- Design – Red Herring Design/NYC
- Consultant – Daniel Levitin

== Charts ==
=== Album ===
==== Weekly charts ====
Chart (1972–76)	Peak position
Australian Albums (Kent Music Report)	46
Canada Top Albums/CDs (RPM)	4
UK Albums (Official Charts)	38
US Billboard Top LPs & Tape	17

Chart (2022)	Peak position
German Albums (Offizielle Top 100)	84

Chart (2025)	Peak position
Greek Albums (IFPI)	35

==== Year-end charts ====
Chart (1973)	Position
US Billboard 200	16

=== Singles ===
Year	Single	Peak position	Chart
1973	"Do It Again" (3:57 edit)	6	US Billboard Hot 100
1973	"Reelin' In the Years"	11	US Billboard Hot 100

== See also ==
- List of 1970s albums considered the best

== Bibliography ==
- Galen, Marjorie; Matthews, Gordon (September 1, 2007). Legends of Rock. Dalmatian Press. ISBN 978-1403737199.
- Sheffield, Rob; et al. (November 2, 2004). Brackett, Nathan; Hoard, Christian (eds.). The New Rolling Stone Album Guide (4th ed.). Simon & Schuster. ISBN 0-7432-0169-8.
- Robustelli, Anthony (2017). Steely Dan FAQ: All that's Left to Know about this Elusive Band. Milwaukee, WI: Backbeat Books. ISBN 9781495025129.
