= The Myddle Class =

American garage rock band

Background information
- Origin: Berkeley Heights, New Jersey, United States
- Genres: Garage rock; folk rock; psychedelic
- Years active: 1964-1969
- Labels: Tomorrow; Buddah
- Past members: Dave Palmer; Rick Philp; Danny Mansolino; Chris Irby; Charles Larkey; Michael "Myke" Rosa

The Myddle Class was an American garage rock band from Berkeley Heights, New Jersey, which was active in the 1960s. Signed to Tomorrow Records which was owned by the songwriters Gerry Goffin and Carole King, they were one of the most popular live acts in the New Jersey/New York region during the 1960s and released several singles, enjoying hits in various local markets such as Albany. In the late 1960s, band members became involved in college and other musical projects. Charles Larkey, who joined the Fugs in late 1967, later married King, following her divorce from Goffin, and played bass guitar on some of her recordings in the 1970s. The Myddle Class intended to record an album in 1969, but was thwarted due to the murder of the guitarist Rick Philp. The band broke up shortly thereafter. The singer, Dave Palmer, later joined Steely Dan and wrote the lyrics to King's hit "Jazzman".

== History ==
=== Origins ===
The band was formed as the King Bees in 1964 made up of high school students from suburban Passaic Valley townships that border the Interstate 78 corridor in New Jersey. The King Bees' initial lineup consisted of Dave Palmer on lead vocals, Rick Philp on guitar, Chris Irby on bass guitar, Danny Mansolino on organ, and Mike Rosa on drums. Palmer and Philp were from Warren Township and were students at Watchung Hills Regional High School. Mansolino from North Plainfield attended North Plainfield High School and had played accordion, but Philp asked him to join on organ. At first, Chris Irby played bass guitar, but when he decided to quit, drummer Rosa from Berkeley Heights brought in Charles Larkey, a friend of his at Governor Livingston High School. Larkey was only just learning the bass when he joined, but he had good stage presence and dressed in all of the latest mod fashions from his father's store Larkey's in Newark. According to Palmer: "I'd always sung in choir and 'folk' groups but when the Rolling Stones hit in the '60s and I discovered it was a wonderful way to 'get' women (not being of the "jock" or award winning Mr. popular student type myself) I devoted myself full time to pursuing a career in music..." The band was named after the song "I'm a King Bee", which was famously covered by the Rolling Stones in 1964.

The King Bees became known for their exciting live shows, which included songs such as "Shout", "She's Not There" and the original, "It's the Season". After a show at the Berkeley Heights Catholic Youth Organization in December 1964, the band met the New York Post columnist Al Aronowitz. Aronowitz heard about the King Bees through his babysitter and despite his lack of experience in the business side of music, became the group's manager. His house in Berkeley Heights became the group's base of operations. Aronowitz introduced them to Carole King and Gerry Goffin, the well-known husband-and-wife song writing team, who were then living nearby in West Orange. They agreed to write songs and produce the group. In fall 1965, the King Bees changed their name to the Myddle Class to distinguish themselves from Danny Kortchmar's King Bees, who just had just released a record on RCA Victor. In October, Goffin and King signed the Myddle Class to their new label, Tomorrow Records, to be distributed by Atlantic-Atco.

=== Recording ===
Their first single, "Free As The Wind", backed with a full-band rendition of Bob Dylan's "Gates of Eden", was released on Tomorrow in December 1965. "Free as the Wind" combined Goffin and King's commercial flair with garage-informed folk rock. Billboard reviewed "Free as the Wind" in its December 1965 issue stating, "New label, new group and new Goffin-King material has smash hit possibilities. Folk rocker is a powerhouse!" The song became a hit in Albany, New York, but despite the glowing Billboard review, it failed to catch on outside the region. Gaining popularity, the Myddle Class played at many of New York's leading clubs, such as the Night Owl and Cafe Au Go Go. On December 11, 1965, the Myddle Class headlined a concert at the Summit High School Auditorium with opening acts the Forty Fingers and the Velvet Underground. Aronowitz produced the show and had booked all of the bands including the Velvet Underground, who used the name "Velvet Underground" for the first time this night.

In 1966, the Myddle Class released a follow-up single, "Don't Let Me Sleep Too Long", which the band took from a demo by the Blues Project that later became their hit "Wake Me Shake Me" — a song covered by many acts. "Don't Let Me Sleep Too Long" and "Wake Me Shake Me" were adapted from an early 20th century African American spiritual, so neither band could claim copyright on it. This hard-rocking single more accurately reflected the Myddle Class' live sound, and reached #2 on the Albany charts, but like their first single did not reach a wider market. It was backed by "I Happen To Love You", an original song written by Goffin and King, subsequently covered by the Electric Prunes. In 1966, Myddle Class opened for the Blues Project.

Goffin and King's distribution deal with Atco fell apart after the "Don't Let Me Sleep Too Long" single. They signed a deal with Cameo-Parkway to distribute the Tomorrow label. The first release on the reconfigured Tomorrow label was by the Bach's Lunch, a female singing group, whose ranks included singer Darlene McCrea of the Cookies and the Raelettes. The Myddle Class provided the instrumental backing on both sides. The A-side was a remake of Goffin and King's "Will You Still Love Me Tomorrow", backed with Philp and Palmer's song "You Go On" on the B-side. The band enjoyed regional successes, and were welcomed by enthusiastic crowds in Montreal and Boston. They did a residency at Ungano's on the upper West Side of Manhattan, and a played a show to over 3000 people in Smithtown, Long Island, which was promoted by DJ Scott Ross. The band encountered a number of discouraging setbacks around this time. They had a successful audition with producer Tom Wilson for MGM Records, but apparently Al Aronowitz did not allow the deal to go through. In February 1967, they opened for the Animals, but their set was marred by technical problems in the microphones and public address system, resulting in poor reviews for the band's performance.

In April 1967, the Myddle Class released one last single. The A-side "Don't Look Back" was a cover of a Temptations song and was self-produced by the group. On the B-side was the song "Wind Chime Laughter", a song written by Philp and Palmer, but credited jointly to the Myddle Class and Goffin. In August 1968, Allen Klein took over Cameo-Parkway and ousted the band's representatives at the label, including Neil Bogart (who later founded Casablanca Records), leaving their new single without any promotion. Some members of the Myddle Class posed anonymously as models in photographs taken by Richard Avedon intended for advertisements. One of Avedon's photographs of Larkey appeared on the cover of Esquire in September 1967. Larkey joined the Fugs in late 1967 for a series of shows at the Players Theater.

=== Late period ===
By late 1967, with some of the band's members either away at college or pursuing other musical ventures, the Myddle Class was rarely performing live. What little active time they had was used to record demos for Goffin and King songs intended for other artists. They are rumored to have recorded and arranged demos of "Pleasant Valley Sunday" and "Porpoise Song" for the Monkees, as well as "Snow Queen" and "Fun and Games", but none of these pieces have ever been released to the public. Among the demos that do exist are "Goin' Back", which became a single for the Byrds in October 1967 and was included on their Notorious Byrd Brothers album, as well as "I Can't Make It Alone" released by Dusty Springfield on Dusty in Memphis. Among the other demos from the sessions are "An Angel Walks Beside Me" and "Who Does He Love". Palmer and Philp signed a publishing with Screen Gems-Columbia, the same publishers representing Goffin and King at this time. But, a promise from Don Kirshner to sign the group to Colgems never materialized, nor did he attempt to have other artists record their songs. The Myddle Class recorded demos of some of these Palmer and Philp songs, such as "Man on the Bridge".

Goffin and King divorced and separately relocated to California in early 1968. Larkey and King began an intimate affair that would eventually lead to marriage. Philp and Larkey spent summer that year in Los Angeles working up arrangements with King for songs that to appear on Now That Everything's Been Said, the album by her group the City. David Palmer co-wrote the song "Paradise City" with King, which appeared on that album. Danny Kortchmar replicated Philp's guitar parts for the Myddle Class' last recordings, released in 1969. In fall 1968, Mansolino, Palmer and Philp were residing in Boston and collaborated on songs with pianist Lloyd Baskin. In March 1969 they recorded a number of songs in the studio, including a new Goffin and King composition "Mr. Charlie", and a couple by Palmer and Philp, "Redbeard" (their nickname for Al Aronowitz) and "Keys to the Kingdom". An album was planned for the band to record in the summer of 1969, but any future chances of the band re-activating were dashed when guitarist Philp was murdered by his former roommate in Boston in May. By this point, the band's enthusiasm had long receded, and they broke up shortly thereafter.

=== Post-breakup ===
After leaving Cameo-Parkway and joining Buddah Records, Neal Bogart posthumously reissued "Don't Let Me Sleep Too Long" b/w "I Happen to Love You" on a single for Buddah in mid-1969, but it had little impact. An unreleased song, "Lovin' Season" originally titled "It's the Season" dated back to 1965, appeared on a Buddah sampler LP Rock And Roll With Buddah distributed at the National Entertainment Conference in Memphis in February, 1970. Mansolino and Rosa joined Jake and the Family Jewels for two Polydor albums in 1969 and 1970. They brought in Palmer as vocalist on a 1971 album as the Quinames Band cut for Elektra Records, where Rosa was now a staff producer. The Quinames Band's ranks included Ken Pine, who had played alongside Charlie Larkey in the Fugs, and Jerry Burnham. Palmer joined Steely Dan and wrote the lyrics to King's 1974 hit "Jazzman". Larkey and King married in September 1970, just as she was beginning to establish herself as a top recording act in the early 1970s.

The Myddle Class's work has come to the attention of garage rock collectors and enthusiasts. Their songs have been included on several compilations such as Mindrocker: the Complete Series Volumes 1-3, issued by Past & Present Records, and Boulders, Volume 3, put out by Moxie.

== Membership circa 1965-1967 ==
- Dave Palmer (vocals)
- Rick Philp (guitar)
- Danny Mansolino (organ)
- Charles Larkey (bass guitar)
- Michael "Myke" Rosa (drums)

== Discography ==
- "Free as the Wind" b/w "Gates of Eden" (Tomorrow 7501, November 1965)
- "Don't Let Me Sleep too Long" b/w "I Happen to Love You" (Tomorrow 7503, June 1966)
- "Don't Look Back" b/w "Wind Chime Laughter" (Tomorrow 912, June 1967)
- "Don't Let Me Sleep Too Long" b/w "I Happen to Love You" (Buddah 150, November 1969)
