= Johnny Rotella =

American woodwind player, session player, and songwriter

Johnny Rotella (November 4, 1920 – September 11, 2014) was an American woodwind player, session player, and songwriter. In a career spanning more than six decades, he wrote over 200 songs, including the Frank Sinatra standard “Nothing but the Best”.

== Early life ==
Rotella was born into a musical family in Jersey City, New Jersey on November 4, 1920. He grew up in North Bergen, New Jersey and married Ann Graziano in 1947.

== Songwriting career ==
Rotella joined ASCAP in 1954. He studied the Schillinger composition method with Disney film composer Franklyn Marks.

Rotella wrote regularly with popular lyricists of the 20th century, including Johnny Mercer, Sammy Cahn, Ray Gilbert, Sidney Clare, Claude Baum, Franz Steininger, Jerry Gladstone, and Abbey Lincoln.

His songs were recorded by Frank Sinatra, Dean Martin, Tony Bennett, Rosemary Clooney, Doris Day, and Frankie Avalon, Slim Whitman, and Ray Conniff Singers.

His work is also featured in the films That’s My Boy in 2012, Hope Springs in 2012, and Jersey Boys in 2014.

=== Notable songs ===
- “Baby O” (Johnny Rotella & Johnny Mercer; recorded by Dean Martin)
- “If You Don’t Think I’m Leaving” (Johnny Rotella & Sammy Cahn; recorded by Frankie Avalon)
- “I Got a Hole in my Soul” (Johnny Rotella & Ray Gilbert; recorded by Rusty Draper)
- “I’ve Waited for a Waltz” (Johnny Rotella & Johnny Mercer; recorded by Tony Bennett)
- “Just Close Your Eyes” (Johnny Rotella & Claude Baum; recorded by Dean Martin)
- “Nothing But the Best” (Johnny Rotella; recorded by Frank Sinatra)
- “Thanks for a Lot, Thanks for Nothing at All” (Johnny Rotella & Jerry Gladstone; recorded by Rosemary Clooney)
- “Time to Say Goodnight” (Johnny Rotella; recorded by Doris Day)
- “You and Me and Love” (Johnny Rotella & Abbey Lincoln; recorded by Abbey Lincoln)
- “You’re Good for Me” (Johnny Rotella & Sidney Clare; recorded by Doris Day)

== Performance career ==
After serving in the 389th Army Service Forces Band during WWII, Rotella joined Raymond Scott's band in New York. He later played with the Benny Goodman and Tommy Dorsey bands.

Rotella performed in Broadway orchestras, for Los Angeles theater productions, and as a band regular on the 1970s CBS variety series The Sonny & Cher Comedy Hour. He also played twin altos with the Billy Vaughn Orchestra.

While traveling with Goodman in California in 1946, Rotella made the decision to move to Hollywood and pursue work as a studio woodwind player. He started with Jerry Gray's Club 15 CBS Radio Show and went on to be a session musician for composer/arrangers Buddy Baker, Earle Hagen, Mike Post, and Jimmie Haskell.

He recorded with Steely Dan and can be heard playing saxophone on the song "My Old School" from the 1973 album Countdown to Ecstasy. He also played on the 1966 Frank Zappa album Freak Out!, and on recordings with Neil Diamond and frequent collaborator Jerry Gray.
