= The Druids of Stonehenge =

American garage/psychedelic rock band

Background information
- Origin: New York, New York, United States
- Genres: Garage rock; R&B; psychedelic rock
- Years active: 1965-1969, 2017-present
- Label: Uni
- Members: Carl Hauser David Budge Billy Cross
- Past members: David Budge; Carl Hauser; Billy Tracy; Tom Workman; Steve Tindall; Elliot Randall

The Druids of Stonehenge are a garage rock and psychedelic band from New York City who were active in the 1960s.

== Background ==
They began as an R&B-based rock combo in the vein of the early Rolling Stones called the Druids, but later moved to the West Coast and changed their name to the Druids of Stonehenge, evolving their sound to fit the burgeoning psychedelic rock coming to the fore. In 1968 they recorded the album, Creation, for Uni Records. They broke up in 1969, but have made occasional reunion appearances, such as a performance in New York in 2008.

== History ==
The group formed as the Druids in New York City in 1965. Their original lineup consisted of Dave Budge on lead vocals, Carl Hauser and Billy Tracy on guitars, Tom Workman on bass, and Steve Tindall on drums. Initially the band's repertoire was made up of largely covers done and was stylistically similar to the early Rolling Stones with a strong R&B orientation. The band went to Nola studios in Manhattan and cut several songs, all covers, such as Bo Diddly's "Who Do You Love" and "Pretty Thing," Screamin' Jay Hawkins' "I Put a Spell on You, as well as "Baby Please Don't Go" and "Pretty Thing." Subsequent sessions over the next year produced more covers done in similarly seething fashion, such as "I (Who Have Nothing)," as well as "Bald Headed Woman." The band became fixtures at New York clubs such as Ondine and the Cheetah. The Druids would eventually change their name to the Druids of Stonehenge as their sound began to reflect the influence of psychedelia.

In 1968 the newly renamed relocated to the West Coast and signed with Uni Records, a Universal/MCA subsidiary. The band's lineup now included Elliot Randall, who replaced Tracy on guitar. He had previously played with Randall's Island and would go on to play with Seatrain, Steely Dan, and many sessions. For Uni they cut the single, "A Garden Where Nothing Grows" b/w "Painted Woman," which reflected the influence of psychedelia. Also released on Uni, they recorded a full-length album entitled Creation, which included their version of Bob Dylan's "It's All Over Now Baby Blue," Love's "Signed D.C.," as well as an updated rendition of "I Put a Spell on You." The album was recorded at two sets of sessions: most of it at TTG Studios in Los Angeles, and the remainder at Nola in New York. The band made a television appearance on the Joe Franklin Show at the time of the album's release, performing their rendition of the Rolling Stones' "Paint It Black". However, the band did not record any subsequent material and broke up in 1969. They have re-united briefly on several occasions, including a performance in New York in late April 2008.

== Later years ==
In the intervening years since their breakup, the band as come the attention of garage rock and psychedelic collectors and enthusiasts and their work has been featured on various compilations. Their early recordings (as the Druids) have been re-issued on a mini-disc put out by Sundazed, but titled in keeping with their later moniker, The Druids of Stonehenge. Some of their songs have been included on the Baubles, Vol. 1. compilation. The entire Creation album has been reissued by Sundazed.

In 2017 original singer David Budge and guitarist Carl Hauser reformed with lifelong friend and former Bob Dylan guitarist Billy Cross, producing an album titled 'Resurrection' that explored the band's roots in historic blues. As the trio got their feet wet with Resurrection they found both old and new magic in its making, and with its strong reception from college blues stations, they decided to not stop there.

In October 2020 The Druids released their first album of all-original material, American Ghosts.

== Membership ==
- David Budge (lead vocals - current)
- Carl J. Hauser, M.D. FACS. (guitar - current)
- Billy Cross (guitar - current)
- Billy Tracy (guitar - former)
- Tom Workman (bass - former)
- Steve Tindall (drums - former)
- Elliot Randall (guitar - former)

== Discography ==
=== 45 rpm ===
- "A Garden Where Nothing Grows" b/w "Painted Woman" (Uni 55021, June 1967)

=== LP ===
- Creation (Uni, 1968)
- Resurrection (The Druids of Stonehenge, 2017)
- American Ghosts (2020)
