= Eye to Eye (band) =

American musical duo

- Origin: Seattle, Washington, U.S.
- Genres: New wave, synthpop
- Years active: 1980–1984, 2001–present
- Labels: Warner Bros., 12th Street
- Members: Deborah Berg; Julian Marshall
- Website: eyetoeyemusic.com

Eye to Eye are a musical duo formed by American singer Deborah Berg and British pianist Julian Marshall (previously of Marshall Hain).

== History ==
They first met in San Diego, California, in 1980 at a performance of the dance ensemble Mostly Women Moving, for whom Berg danced. Berg had been injured and sang instead of dancing on the night of the performance Marshall attended; he spoke with Berg and a few weeks later asked her to fly to England to record with him.

A recording contract with Automatic Records followed soon after, and their first single, "Am I Normal?", came out later that year. The single came to the attention of Steely Dan producer Gary Katz, which led to a contract with Warner Bros. Records. Their self-titled debut album was produced by Katz and released in 1982. The lead single "Nice Girls" cracked the Top 40 in the U.S. Billboard Hot 100. A second album, Shakespeare Stole My Baby, followed in 1983, but it did not receive much label support and did not sell well. Until 2002, both albums would be available only as Japanese imports on CD, but in 2002, they were both released by independent label Wounded Bird Records on one CD.

In 2001, the members reunited, and in 2005 released a third album.

== Discography ==
- Eye to Eye (Warner Bros., 1982) U.S. No. 99
- Shakespeare Stole My Baby (Warner Bros., 1983) U.S. No. 205
- Clean Slate (12th St., 2005)

== Singles ==
- "Am I Normal?" (1980)
- "Nice Girls" (1982) U.S. No. 37, AUS No.89
- "Lucky" (1983) U.S. No. 88
