= Congressional Picnic =

Annual presidential event

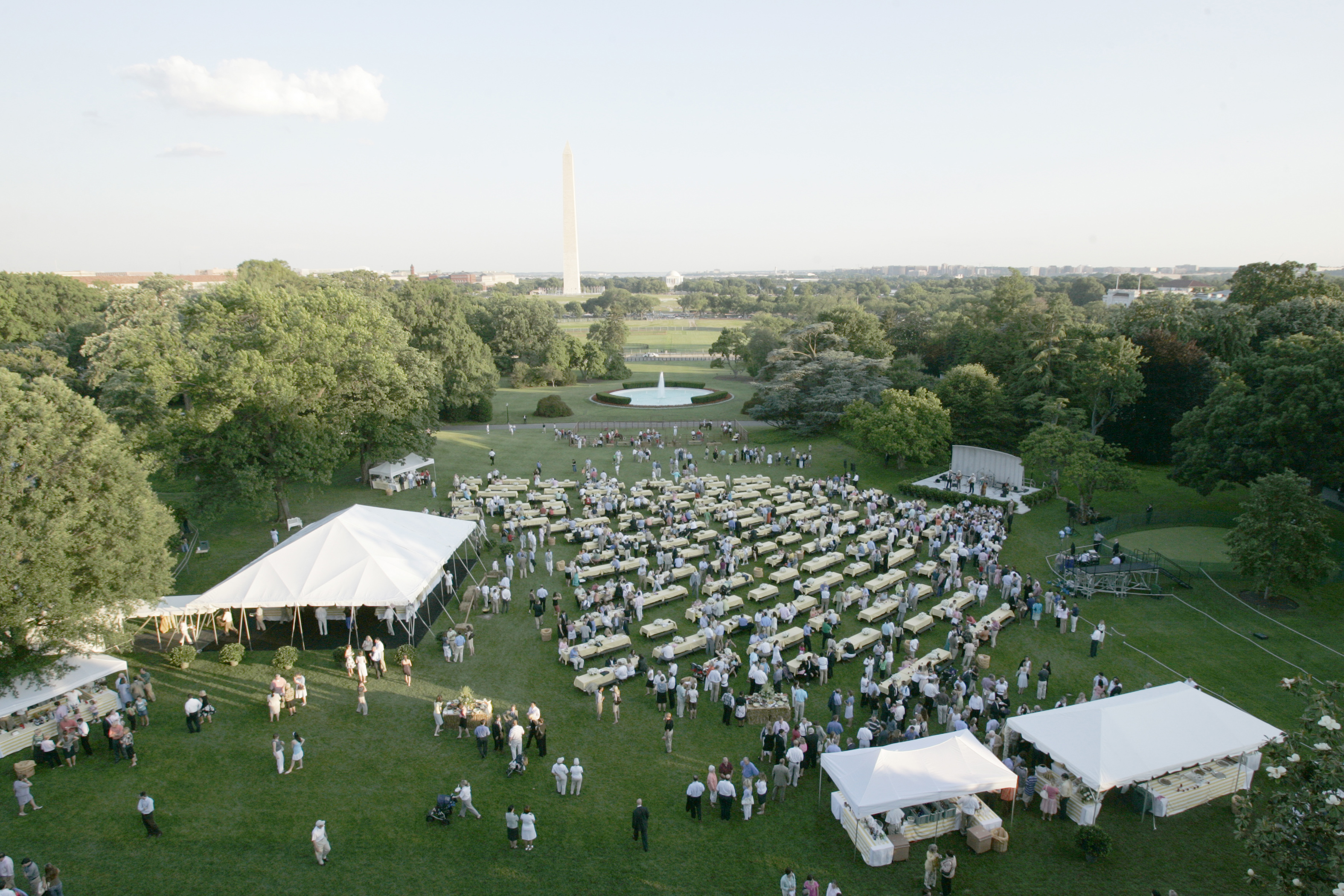
Overview of the 2006 Congressional Picnic

The Congressional Picnic is an annual event held on the South Lawn of the White House. Members of Congress and their families are invited to spend time with the president and other White House staffers in a relaxed setting. The Picnic features carnival rides and musical performances. Each year's Picnic features a theme, such as the Wild West, Broadway, and Mardi Gras.

Vice President Mike Pence described the event as "about being able to leave politics outside the gate and being able to get together with the families of those who serve in both political parties." Obama spokesman Josh Earnest called it "an opportunity for members of Congress to bring their families to enjoy a nice evening on the South Lawn of the White House."

President Donald Trump postponed the 2018 Congressional Picnic due to the appearance of having such an event while dealing with the crisis involving the separation of children from their parents at the US border. The crisis was a result of the Trump administration's continuing the "zero tolerance" policy towards illegal immigrants placed by the previous Obama administration.
