= Punch in/out =

Audio and video recording technique

Punch in/out is an audio and video term that originated as a recording technique used on early multitrack recordings whereby a portion of the performance was recorded onto a previously recorded tape, usually overwriting any sound that had previously been on the track used. The erasing and/or recording heads had to be very carefully aligned and applied to the tape surface with delicate timing and precision to avoid ruining the recording, and the practice was feared by most producers and engineers.

After the advent of 16- and 24-track equipment it was no longer necessary to risk the recording as a whole, as an empty portion of another track could be dedicated to such use. Vocalists in particular would usually record several renditions over separate parallel tracks, with the producers choosing the best bits from the layered vocals to mix together. The term "punching in" remained in use despite this fact.

== In digital recording ==
In modern, digital audio workstation-based recording environments, punching in and out can be done automatically by pre-selecting the in and out points on the timeline of the DAW. When the record button is pressed, the DAW software will play back the previously recorded track outside of these points. As soon as the playhead reaches the in-point, the recording begins and the previously recorded material is muted. At the out-point, recording stops and the software reverts to playback.

== Rapping ==
A more recent form of recording music, also dubbed "punching in" is the concept of creating a song by saying every bar rather than writing it down, while pausing to think of a next one to record until the entire song comes together, done in a similar fashion to freestyling. This improvisation technique was popularized by Jay-Z in the late 90s and Lil Wayne in the 2000s and has risen in popularity with artists such as Kanye West, Juice WRLD, Lil Durk, The Weeknd, Lil Baby, SoFaygo, Yeat and more.

== See also ==
- Double tracking
- Stab (music)
