= David Palmer (vocalist) =

American singer-songwriter

- Born: Watchung, New Jersey, U.S.
- Genres: Pop rock; jazz rock
- Occupations: Singer; musician; photographer
- Instruments: Vocals; keyboards
- Years active: 1964–2002 (musician); 2002–present (photographer)
- Formerly of: The Myddle Class; Quinaimes Band; Steely Dan; Wha-Koo

David Palmer is an American vocalist, songwriter and photographer best known as member of Steely Dan during the band's early years, and as the lyricist of "Jazzman", a No. 2 hit for Carole King. Palmer is known for his light tenor voice which contrasted with his fellow Steely Dan singer Donald Fagen.

== Early life ==
Palmer was born and raised in the New Jersey communities of Warren Township and Watchung and attended Watchung Hills Regional High School. He sang in choir and folk groups as a child.

== Musical career ==
His first band was the Myddle Class, formed in 1964 under the initial name of the King Bees while its members were still in high school. Their manager, Al Aronowitz, introduced them to the hit songwriters Gerry Goffin and Carole King, who were looking to add bands to their new label, Tomorrow Records. The Myddle Class's first single, "Free as the Wind", was co-written by Palmer with King, Goffin, and Rick Philp (the Myddle Class's guitarist), and reached number 12 in Albany, New York in March 1966. The band performed at clubs such as the Night Owl in Greenwich Village, released two more singles on the Tomorrow record label, and recorded a number of demos for Goffin and King before the murder of Philp let to their disbanding in 1969. In 1971 Palmer formed the Quinaimes Band with several Myddle Class members, and they recorded an album for Elektra Records before disbanding.

At the invitation of his associate Jeff Baxter, Palmer joined Steely Dan in August 1972, in the middle of recording sessions for their debut album Can't Buy a Thrill. He sang lead on two tracks on Can't Buy a Thrill, "Dirty Work" and "Brooklyn (Owes the Charmer Under Me)", as well as doubling parts of Donald Fagen's vocals on "Reelin' in the Years", "Only a Fool Would Say That" and "Change of the Guard" in order to reach the high notes. He also sang lead on most of Steely Dan's songs when performed live during their early concerts because of Fagen's early-career stage fright before audiences. In addition, Walter Becker and Donald Fagen wrote several songs specifically to showcase Palmer's particular vocal abilities, including "Megashine City", "Take My Money", and "Hellbound Train"; all of these songs were never recorded but were played by Steely Dan on tour.

Palmer was fired from Steely Dan in April 1973, the other members having concluded that he was not a good fit for their songs. He is credited for backing vocals on the band's subsequent release, Countdown to Ecstasy, but apparently in error; although Palmer did take part in demo sessions for the album, the actual recording sessions took place over two months after he left Steely Dan, and Becker and Fagen have stated that he did not sing a note on the actual album. Palmer was accepting of the decision. In a 1997 interview, he said, "There were two reasons for me leaving the Dan: First, I was asked to. Second, when you have a singer as great as Donald Fagen was and is, you don’t need another lead singer in the band. I'll always be grateful to Donald [Fagen] and Walter [Becker] for giving me a break and also for their musical integrity."

Palmer sued the Steely Dan corporation for unpaid digital royalties in 2014 and received a settlement. Palmer had sued because he had not been paid royalties for online streaming Steely Dan audio, saying: "I did not want their money, I wanted my money."

After Steely Dan, Palmer worked with a number of songwriters, including King. He wrote all the lyrics for King's album Wrap Around Joy, including the composition "Jazzman" and "Nightingale". He formed the band Wha-Koo with Danny Douma in 1977. Wha-Koo released three albums, The Big Wha-Koo in 1977, Berkshire in 1978 and Fragile Line in 1979. He also contributed the song "Silhouette" to the 1985 film Teen Wolf.

== Digital photography career ==
Since 2002, Palmer has been a digital photographer, making landscapes, portraits and fine-art images.

He lives in Charlotte, North Carolina.
