= Denny Dias =

American guitarist (born 1946)

- Born: Dennis Dias; December 12, 1946 (age 79); Philadelphia, Pennsylvania, U.S.
- Genres: Rock, jazz rock
- Occupation: Musician
- Instrument: Guitar
- Label: ABC Records

Dennis Dias (born December 12, 1946) is an American guitarist, best known for being a founding member of Steely Dan.

== Early life ==
Denny Dias was born on December 12, 1946 in Philadelphia, Pennsylvania. However, his family moved to Brooklyn, New York when he was still a baby, and to Hicksville, New York when he was just eight years old. He got his first guitar, a cheap model with just three strings, when he was 12 years old, and had lessons with Billy Bauer.

Dias first enrolled in junior college as a music major, but later switched majors to engineering and then to mathematics. He studied computer science at SUNY Downstate College of Medicine, but left after one semester to pursue a career as a professional musician.

== Career ==
Dias played in a number of bands in the Long Island area, including The Saints and The Grapevine, but he was working with his own band, Demian, out of his garage in Hicksville, New York, when his band's manager, Bruce Rothstein, placed an ad in The Village Voice in the summer of 1970 that read: "Looking for keyboardist and bassist. Must have jazz chops! No hangups". Donald Fagen and Walter Becker responded to the advertisement.

Though both Dias and Demian's vocalist, Keith Thomas, were writing songs, club patrons in Long Island were only interested in hearing cover songs, so Demian's original material was rarely played live. Dias and Thomas were impressed enough by Becker and Fagen's songs that they stopped writing, finding their own songs worthless by comparison, and even agreed to replace Demian's drummer Mark Leon with John Discepelo as a condition of Becker and Fagen joining the band. Becker and Fagen were also unwilling to perform live, so for a time Damien was limited to rehearsing in hopes of an eventual record deal. Becker and Fagen moved to California, called Dias down once they were settled in, and added drummer Jim Hodder and guitarist Jeff "Skunk" Baxter before recording for ABC/Dunhill Records as Steely Dan. Dias recorded as a permanent member of the band on 1972's Can't Buy a Thrill (with an electric sitar solo on the song "Do It Again"), on 1973's Countdown to Ecstasy (with a bebop guitar solo on the song "Bodhisattva"), and on 1974's Pretzel Logic (with a distorted wah-wah guitar solo on the song "Parker's Band").

Following a tour promoting Pretzel Logic, Becker and Fagen decided to reduce Steely Dan to a duo of themselves, and use session musicians as needed on albums and tours. Though no longer a member of the band, Dias continued to work with them as a session guitarist and performed on 1975's Katy Lied, 1976's The Royal Scam, and 1977's Aja. In 1991 he joined Toto on their Summer Festival Tour. He also recorded with Hampton Hawes, Wilfrido Vargas and Pete Christlieb. Some of Dias's original material was recorded on a 1999 CD called Matter of Time, with Lisa Jason (vocals) and Andy Bergsten (bass) as the core of the band.

Following his career with Steely Dan, Dias became a software engineer, and worked on Clipper. He continued to play music on the side.

In 2014, he was playing with Denny Dias and Friends, a Boston-based band formed with Lisa Jason and Andy Bergsten with session musicians from around the country. In 2015, they planned a tour that included the Iridium in NYC.

== Discography ==
With Steely Dan

- Can't Buy a Thrill (ABC, 1972)
- Countdown to Ecstasy (ABC, 1973)
- Pretzel Logic (ABC, 1974)
- Katy Lied (ABC, 1975)
- The Royal Scam (ABC, 1976)
- Aja (ABC, 1977)

With others

- Soundtrack to You've Got to Walk It Like You Talk It or You'll Lose That Beat (1971) with Walter Becker and Donald Fagen, credited as Denny Diaz
- David Garfield and Friends, Tribute to Jeff (Intercord, 1997)
