= Sherlie Matthews =

American singer, songwriter and record producer (born 1934)

- Born: November 10, 1934 (age 91); Los Angeles, California, U.S.
- Genres: R&B; pop; rock
- Occupations: Singer; songwriter; producer; author

Sherlie Mae Matthews (born November 10, 1934) is an American singer, songwriter and former Motown Records producer, best known as a backing vocalist for pop, R&B and rock groups from the mid-1960s to the present.

== Career ==
=== Mirwood ===
Employing her as both a lyricist and composer, she created many of the 1960s and 1970s hits for Mirwood Records' artists, including Jackie Lee, The Olympics, Bobby Garrett, The Mirettes, The Belles and Bob & Earl.

=== Motown ===
Frank Wilson, a personal friend, who was a producer/writer with Motown Records, enhanced her professional career when he introduced her to that Label in December 1964. Soon thereafter, she was signed as a singer-songwriter/producer. She performed with Diana Ross and Lionel Richie and the Commodores on-stage and wrote and produced recordings for: the Jackson 5, the Supremes, Diana Ross & Marvin Gaye, Martha and the Vandellas, the Four Tops, The Celebration, Stacie Johnson, and The Blackberries, a trio that she formed with fellow backing vocalists, Venetta Fields and Clydie King. She also collaborated with the songwriter and producer, Deke Richards, on many of the above projects, which included the co-production of The Jackson Five recording two songs from the musical, Pippin: namely, "Corner of the Sky" and "Skywriter" and the group Celebration, which released an album on Motown's MoWest label.

Several of the hundreds of recordings she appeared on are: "Stayin' Alive" with the Bee Gees, "Signed, Sealed, Delivered I'm Yours" with Stevie Wonder, The "Aja" Album with Steely Dan, "The Bitch Is Back" with Elton John, and "Take Me in Your Arms (Rock Me a Little While)" and "I Been Workin' On You" with The Doobie Brothers, "You're No Good" with Linda Ronstadt, "Feelin' Alright" with Joe Cocker, "Sweet Home Alabama" with Lynyrd Skynyrd.

=== Later career ===
Matthews lived and worked in Australia from 1984 through 1988. While there she sang backing vocals for Australian Crawl, John Justin, John Farnham, Joe Camilleri, Renée Geyer, Peter Blakeley, Richard Clapton, Stephen Cummings, Swanee, David Reyne, Beeb Birtles, Red Symons, Cattletruck, Paul Agar, Max Merritt, Tim Finn, Martin Armiger, One World, The Arc of Baghdad and Venetta Fields' groups, Venetta's Taxi and The Gospel Jubilee and Yu-En.

Matthews recorded several commercials and voice overs in addition to performing on-stage and recording as one of the lead singers with ZwaDaVee and The Hi Tones.

She formed the children's performing group "Babe" and wrote and produced two songs for them: "A Fuzzy Ball Of Fur" and "A Christmas Medley". The eight-member group made several public and TV appearances under her guidance. She continued working with them until her family's situation demanded her full-time help and she had to return to the United States. Upon her return she resumed working in the entertainment industry, while earning an additional degree from UCLA in Computer Graphics/Animation.

In June 2005, she accepted an invitation from Adrian Croasdell of Ace Records, London, to sing for a weekend concert. With vocalists, Jim Gilstrap and Marva Holiday, she performed many of her originals from the Mirwood era for a 1960s and 1970s music-loving crowd at a Cleethorpes venue.

In 2008, she released a solo CD of original songs, We Come As One. With her sister and co-writer, she is also released a CD of original children's songs, A Band Of Angels. The 2009 Motown 50th anniversary album contained two songs that Matthews wrote, co-produced and sang with her former group The Blackberries. The songs included are: "But I Love You More" and "Somebody Up There Help Me." Her 2010 solo release was "I'm A Cute Little Gay Boy, Inside". She has written and arranged over 500 songs, both secular and sacred. Many of these have been recorded. She's also written three children's musical comedies, two movie themes, and several commercials.
