= Jim Hodder (musician) =

American jazz-rock drummer (1947–1990)

- Born: December 17, 1947; Bethpage, New York, U.S.
- Died: June 5, 1990 (aged 42) Point Arena, California, U.S.
- Genres: Pop rock, jazz rock, psychedelic rock
- Occupation: Musician
- Instruments: Drums, percussion, vocals
- Years active: 1967–1990

Jim Hodder (December 17, 1947 – June 5, 1990) was an American musician, best known as the original drummer for Steely Dan. After leaving the Boston group Bead Game, Hodder moved to Los Angeles to join Steely Dan. He played on their first three albums before leaving in 1974, and worked as a session musician before his death in 1990.

== Biography ==
=== Early years, Bead Game ===
Hodder was born in the small Long Island hamlet of Bethpage, New York, in 1947. He graduated from Plainedge High School in the Plainedge Union Free School District in 1965 and relocated to the Boston area, becoming active in the local music scene.

As a drummer, he joined the Boston-based rock group Bead Game, named after Hermann Hesse's novel The Glass Bead Game. He replaced their original drummer, Joe D'Amico. However, their original lead vocalist John Leone quit, and through auditions Bead Game were unable to find a suitable replacement, so Hodder took on the role of lead vocalist solely for lack of anyone else to do it. Their first album, Baptism, was recorded without a contract with a record label and was consequently canceled. It was not released until 1996 (six years after Hodder's death), and then only in a limited edition of 900 copies.

Bead Game built a local following in Boston clubs and attracted the attention of Avco Records and producer Gary Katz. The band's second album, Welcome, was produced by Katz (under the pseudonym Gary Kannon) and issued in 1970 on Avco/Embassy. It was not a commercial success, selling approximately 50,000 copies, with nearly all sales on the East Coast. The album featured a late-psychedelic and early-progressive crossover sound. Also in 1970, Bead Game performed two songs in the film The People Next Door, and recorded the album Easy Ridin' as part of the collective Freedom Express. In addition, though no singles were released from Welcome, a non-album single by Bead Game was released, "Sweet Medusa" b/w "Country Girls".

=== Steely Dan ===
Hodder met Boston guitarist Jeff "Skunk" Baxter during rehearsals with Bead Game, since Bead Game and Baxter's band Ultimate Spinach were both managed by Ray Paret, and the two found they got along well. In 1972, Hodder accepted an invitation from Katz and Baxter to relocate to Los Angeles and join Steely Dan, a new group built around songwriters Donald Fagen and Walter Becker. He made the move with his girlfriend Kathi Kamen Goldmark, later a successful author and musician. He barely knew the other members prior to tracking their first records. However, since the breakup of Bead Game in 1970 Hodder had been having difficulty finding enough work to make a living, so he accepted the offer.

Hodder was the group's drummer, but also occasionally sang lead vocals due to Fagen's insecurities as a vocalist. He sang "Dallas", the A-side of the initial Steely Dan single, and "Midnite Cruiser" from the debut album, Can't Buy a Thrill. The band embarked upon extensive touring in the wake of early commercial success. Hodder appeared on Countdown to Ecstasy, a band-focused effort recorded the following year after the group's sound had cohered on the road. On November 18, 1973, Hodder and Baxter guested on a live broadcast concert by Linda Ronstadt from Sausalito, California.

Although still a band member, he played a diminished role on Steely Dan's third LP, Pretzel Logic (1974). Before recording began, Becker and Fagen met with Hodder and told him they planned to use session drummers on the album. With session musician Jim Gordon and future Toto member Jeff Porcaro drumming, Hodder's role was relegated to backup vocals on one track, "Parker's Band". During this time, he turned down an offer to tour with The Doobie Brothers. The touring band assembled to promote Pretzel Logic featured simultaneous drumming from Porcaro and Hodder. Hodder was initially uncomfortable with the idea, but later acknowledged the creative potential of the setup. Both he and Baxter left the group after the tour, as Becker and Fagen reduced band activity to studio sessions with guest musicians.

=== Session work ===
Hodder continued working as a session drummer, playing on select tracks on the 1976 albums Nine on a Ten Scale by Sammy Hagar and Sibling Rivalry by The Rowans. He later appeared as the sole drummer on David Soul's Playing to an Audience of One and Rocky Sullivan's 1984 Caught in the Crossfire.

=== Death ===
On June 4 1990, Hodder was found unconscious at the bottom of the swimming pool of his Point Arena, California home. He was subsequently taken to Ukiah Medical Center where he was placed on life support. Hodder died at 3:25 AM on June 5. He was 42 years old. At the time of his death, Hodder's blood-alcohol level was at 0.28%, which is more than three times the legal limit in the state of California.
