= Jeff Baxter =

American musician (born 1948)

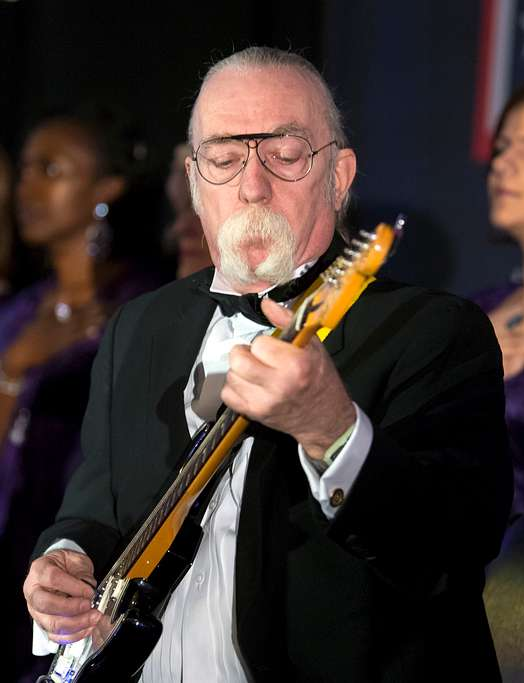
- Baxter performing at USO of Metropolitan Washington-Baltimore's 36th Annual Awards Dinner in Washington, D.C. May 10, 2018

Background information
- Born: Jeffrey Allen Baxter; December 13, 1948 (age 77); Washington, D.C., U.S.
- Genres: Rock; jazz-rock; blue-eyed soul
- Occupations: Musician; songwriter; producer; military advisor
- Instruments: Guitar; keyboards; percussion
- Years active: 1968–present
- Labels: Warner Bros.; Capitol; Glass Records; Arista
- Formerly of: Steely Dan; The Doobie Brothers; Ultimate Spinach

Jeffrey Allen "Skunk" Baxter (born December 13, 1948) is an American guitarist, known for his stints in the rock bands Steely Dan and the Doobie Brothers during the 1970s and Spirit in the 1980s. More recently, he has worked as a defense consultant and advised U.S. members of Congress on missile defense. He was inducted into the Rock and Roll Hall of Fame as a member of the Doobie Brothers in 2020.

== Early life and education ==
Jeffrey Baxter was born in Washington, D.C., and spent some of his formative years in Mexico. He graduated from the Taft School in 1967 in Watertown, Connecticut, and was a self-described preppie. He enrolled at the School of Public Communication (now College of Communication) at Boston University in September 1967, where he studied journalism while continuing to perform with local bands. His freshman roommate was blues musician James Montgomery.

== Music career ==
=== Early years ===
Baxter was a classically trained pianist, studying from the age of 5 to 15. When he was 9 years old, his family moved to Mexico City, where he bought a cheap guitar and taught himself how to play. He joined his first band at age 11. At the Taft School, he played drums in a band called King Thunder and the Lightning Bolts. While still a high school student, he worked at Jimmy's Music Shop in Manhattan in 1966. At Jimmy's, Baxter met guitarist Jimi Hendrix, who was just beginning his career as a frontman. Later, Baxter claimed to have sat in with the Hendrix-led band Jimmy James and the Blue Flames, when the regular bassist could not make the show. Work at Jimmy's also led to Baxter's first professional job as a musician; while delivering an amplifier to a record company, he ended up filling in for a guitarist who was late to a demo session. Moving to Boston to attend college, Baxter worked as a guitar technician and amplifier repairman at Jack's Drum Shop on Boylston Street.

Baxter first reached a wide rock audience in 1968 as a member of the psychedelic rock band Ultimate Spinach. Baxter joined the band for Ultimate Spinach III, their third and final album. After leaving Ultimate Spinach, he learned how to play pedal steel guitar, played with the Holy Modal Rounders, and backed singer Buzzy Linhart. He was using the moniker "Skunk" by this time; so far, Baxter has kept the origin of the nickname a secret.

Baxter found extensive work as a session guitarist, including playing on Carly Simon's first top 10 hit, "That's the Way I've Always Heard It Should Be".

=== With Steely Dan ===
In 1972, Baxter relocated to Los Angeles for more studio work. There he became a founding member of the band Steely Dan. Baxter had played with the drummer, Jim Hodder, on a number of occasions, and was acquainted with Steely Dan's producer, Gary Katz, who was responsible for inviting Baxter to join the group.

Baxter appeared with Steely Dan on their first three albums, Can't Buy a Thrill in 1972, Countdown to Ecstasy in 1973, and Pretzel Logic in 1974, and played with them on three full tours. Despite this, he continued to do session recordings and live shows with other acts while an official member of Steely Dan. He contributed the guitar fills and signature solo heard on Steely Dan's highest charting hit, "Rikki Don't Lose That Number."

=== With The Doobie Brothers ===
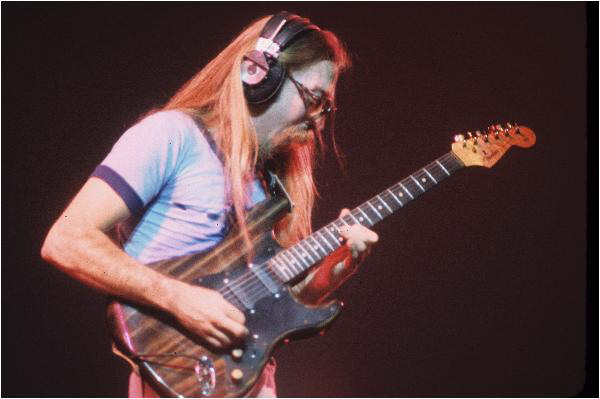
Baxter performing with The Doobie Brothers in the 1970s.

While finishing work on Pretzel Logic, Baxter became aware of Becker and Fagen's intentions to retire Steely Dan from touring and work almost exclusively with session players. With that in mind, Baxter left the band in 1974 to join The Doobie Brothers, who at the time were touring in support of their fourth album What Were Once Vices Are Now Habits. Baxter had already done work for The Doobie Brothers as a session guitarist (on What Were Once Vices Are Now Habits and its predecessor, The Captain and Me) and often sat in with them during concerts where Steely Dan were their opening act.

Baxter's first album as a full member of the group was 1975's Stampede; however, he does not appear on the cover photo, since it was taken before he joined the group. He contributed an acoustic interlude ("Precis") and significant turns on slide and pedal steel guitar.

While preparing to tour in support of Stampede, Doobie Brothers founder Tom Johnston was hospitalized with a stomach ailment. To fill in for Johnston on vocals, Baxter suggested bringing in singer-keyboardist Michael McDonald, with whom Baxter had worked in Steely Dan. With Johnston still convalescing, McDonald was invited to join the band full-time. McDonald's vocal and songwriting contributions, as well as Baxter's jazzier guitar style, marked a new direction for the band. They went on to continued success with the 1976 album Takin' It to the Streets, 1977's Livin' on the Fault Line, and particularly 1978's Minute by Minute, which spent five weeks as the No. 1 album in the U.S. and spawned several hit singles; Baxter's work on the album includes an extended solo at the end of the closing track "How Do the Fools Survive?". As with Steely Dan, Baxter continued to do extensive session work while a member of The Doobie Brothers.

In early 1979, Baxter left the band, as did drummer and band co-founder John Hartman. McDonald had grown frustrated with the way Baxter altered the guitar lines in his songs and indicated that he could no longer work with him.

=== Later music career ===
Baxter has continued working as a session guitarist for a diverse group of artists, including Willy DeVille, Bryan Adams, Hoyt Axton, Eric Clapton, Gene Clark, Sheryl Crow, Freddie Hubbard, Tim Weisberg, Joni Mitchell, Ricky Nelson, Dolly Parton, Carly Simon, Ringo Starr, Gene Simmons, Rod Stewart, Burton Cummings, Barbra Streisand, and Donna Summer. He has worked as a touring musician for Elton John, Linda Ronstadt, and Billy Vera and the Beaters.

In 1982, he featured on Spirit's album Spirit of '84, released as The Thirteenth Dream outside of the US.

In 1984, Baxter played keyboards with Bobby and the Midnites' Bob Weir, Billy Cobham, Bobby Cochran, Kenny Gradney ("Tigger"), and Dave Garland at the Capitol Theatre in Passaic, New Jersey. That same year, he produced and played guitar and synthesizer on the band's album Where the Beat Meets the Street on Columbia Records.

In 1986, Baxter joined James Brown and Maceo Parker on guitar for several North American tour dates.

In 1990, Baxter joined John Entwistle, Joe Walsh, Keith Emerson, Simon Phillips and relatively unknown vocalist Rick Livingstone in a supergroup called The Best. The group released a live performance video in Japan before disbanding. He also produced two albums for the hard rock band Nazareth, and also produced albums for Carl Wilson, Livingston Taylor, The Ventures, and Nils Lofgren. He was producer on the 1982 Bob Welch album Eye Contact. In 1991 Baxter also produced a documentary video, "Guitar" (Warner Brothers VHS and LaserDisc), in which he travels the world and interviews guitarists he admires. In 1994 he performed on the video game Tuneland.

In 1997 Baxter scored the movie The Curse of Inferno.

In 2007, Baxter jammed with former White House Press Secretary Tony Snow's band Beats Workin' at the National Press Club and the Congressional Picnic held on the White House South Lawn.

Baxter continues to do studio work, most recently on tribute albums to Pink Floyd and Aerosmith. In 2012, he appeared on keyboardist Brian Auger's Language of the Heart, and The Beach Boys' That's Why God Made the Radio.

He also occasionally plays in The Coalition of the Willing, a band comprising Andras Simonyi, Hungarian Ambassador to the United States; Alexander Vershbow, US Ambassador to South Korea; Daniel Poneman, formerly of the United States National Security Council and later the Obama Administration's Deputy Secretary of Energy; and Lincoln Bloomfield Jr., former United States Assistant Secretary of State for Political-Military Affairs.

In 2022, Baxter released his first solo album.

=== Other media ===
Baxter appeared on the TV sitcom What's Happening!! in the two-part episode "Doobie or Not Doobie" (1978) as a member of the Doobie Brothers.

Baxter worked on the animated TV series King of the Hill in 1997, composing songs for three episodes: "Peggy the Boggle Champ", "Hank's Unmentionable Problem", and "Square Peg". Also in 1997, he worked on two other TV series as a composer: The Blues Brothers Animated Series and The Curse of Inferno. He composed for Shelley Duvall's Bedtime Stories TV series episode "Bootsie Barker Bites/Ruby the Copycat" in 1993, the Pee-wee's Playhouse episode "Tons of Fun" in 1987, and the Beverly Hills, 90210 episode "The Green Room" in 1990. He is credited on the movie soundtrack for the feature film Roxanne (1987) as writer and producer for the songs "Party Tonight" and "Can This Be Love". Other credits include music for Class of 1984 (1982): "You Better Not Step Out of Line" and as a performer on "Suburbanite". He appeared in the film Blues Brothers 2000 and can be heard on the cast album.

Baxter has appeared in a number of documentaries, including Jan & Dean: The Other Beach Boys (2002), The History of Rock 'n' Roll (1995), American Bandstand's 40th Anniversary Special (1995), Emerson (2013), Turn It Up! (2013), Amazing Journey: The Story of The Who (2007), Overnight (2003), The Doobie Brothers: Let the Music Play (2012), The Making of 'Blues Brothers 2000' (1998) and Guitar (1991).

== Defense consulting career ==
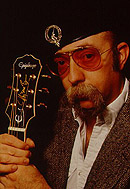

Baxter fell into his second profession almost by accident. In the mid-1980s, his interest in music recording technology led him to wonder about hardware and software originally developed for military use, specifically data compression algorithms and large-capacity storage devices.

His next-door neighbor was a retired engineer who had worked on the Sidewinder missile program. This neighbor bought Baxter a subscription to Aviation Week magazine, provoking his interest in additional military-oriented publications and missile defense systems in particular. He became self-taught in this area, and at one point wrote a five-page paper that proposed converting the ship-based anti-aircraft Aegis missile into a rudimentary missile defense system.

He gave the paper to California Republican Congressman Dana Rohrabacher, and his career as a defense consultant began. Baxter received a series of security clearances so he could work with classified information. In 1995, Pennsylvania Republican Congressman Curt Weldon, then the chairman of the House Military Research and Development Subcommittee, nominated Baxter to chair the Civilian Advisory Board for Ballistic Missile Defense.

Baxter's work with that panel led to consulting contracts with the Pentagon's Missile Defense Agency and National Geospatial-Intelligence Agency. He consults for the US Department of Defense and the US intelligence community, as well as defense-oriented manufacturers such as Science Applications International Corporation, Northrop Grumman Corp., General Dynamics, and General Atomics Aeronautical Systems Inc. He has said his unconventional approach to thinking about terrorism, tied to his interest in technology, is a major reason the government sought his assistance.

"We thought turntables were for playing records until rappers began to use them as instruments, and we thought airplanes were for carrying passengers until terrorists realized they could be used as missiles," Baxter has said. "Among other things, what I do is look at existing technologies and hypothesize how they might be applied in non-traditional ways, something that happens in music all the time and also happens to be something that terrorists are incredibly good at."

Baxter has also appeared in public debates and as a guest on CNN and Fox News advocating missile defense. He served as a national spokesman for Americans for Missile Defense, a coalition of organizations devoted to the issue.

In 2000, Baxter considered challenging Representative Brad Sherman for the 24th Congressional District seat in California before deciding not to run.

In April 2005, he joined the NASA Exploration Systems Advisory Committee.

Baxter was a member of an independent study group that produced the Civil Applications Committee Blue Ribbon Study recommending an increased domestic role for US spy satellites in September 2005. This study was first reported by The Wall Street Journal on August 15, 2007. He is listed as "Senior Thinker and Raconteur" at the Florida Institute for Human and Machine Cognition, and is a Senior Fellow and Member of the Board of Regents at the Potomac Institute for Policy Studies.

== Discography ==
With Four on the Floor

- Four on the Floor (Casablanca, 1979)

With Richie Havens

- The End of the Beginning (A&M Records, 1976)
- Connections (Elektra Records, 1980)

With Steve Cropper

- Night After Night (MCA Records, 1982)

With Glen Campbell

- Somethin' 'Bout You Baby I Like (Capitol Records, 1980)

With Dolly Parton

- Heartbreaker (RCA Records, 1978)
- 9 to 5 and Odd Jobs (RCA Records, 1980)
- Heartbreak Express (RCA Records, 1982)

With Ringo Starr

- Time Takes Time (Private Music, 1992)
- Vertical Man (Mercury Records, 1998)

With Jackie DeShannon

- Quick Touches (Amherst Records, 1978)

With Livingston Taylor

- Man's Best Friend (Epic Records, 1980)

With Al Kooper

- Championship Wrestling (Columbia Records, 1982)

With Steely Dan

- Can't Buy a Thrill (ABC Records, 1972)
- Countdown to Ecstasy (ABC Records, 1973)
- Pretzel Logic (ABC Records, 1974)

With Rod Stewart

- Tonight I'm Yours (Warner Bros. Records, 1981)
- When We Were the New Boys (Warner Bros. Records, 1998)

With Dalbello

- Drastic Measures (Capitol Records, 1981)

With Judy Collins

- Hard Times for Lovers (Elektra Records, 1979)

With Carly Simon

- Carly Simon (Elektra Records, 1971)
- Playing Possum (Elektra Records, 1975)
- Another Passenger (Elektra Records, 1976)

With Leo Sayer

- Here (Warner Bros.Records, 1979)

With Joe Cocker

- Heart & Soul (EMI, 2004)

With Elton John

- Captain Fantastic and the Brown Dirt Cowboy Deluxe Edition – Live Concert, Wembley, June 21, 1975 (Island reissue, 2005)

With Deniece Williams

- I'm So Proud (Columbia Records, 1983)
- Let's Hear It for the Boy (Columbia Records, 1984)

With John Mellencamp

- Nothin' Matters and What If It Did (Riva Records, 1980)

With Albert King

- Red House (Essential Records, 1991)

With Dusty Springfield

- It Begins Again (Mercury Records, 1978)

With Barbra Streisand

- Wet (Columbia Records, 1979)
- Till I Loved You (Columbia Records, 1988)

With Tom Rush

- Ladies Love Outlaws (Columbia Records, 1974)

With Donna Summer

- Bad Girls (Casablanca Records, 1979)
- The Wanderer (Geffen, 1980)

With Cher

- Stars (Warner Bros. Records, 1975)

With Cerrone

- V-Angelina (Because-Malligator, 1979)

With Carl Wilson

- Youngblood (Caribou Records, 1983)

With Steve Goodman

- Hot Spot (Asylum Records, 1980)
- Unfinished Business (Red Pajamas, 1987)

With Joni Mitchell

- The Hissing of Summer Lawns (Asylum Records, 1975)

With The Beach Boys

- That's Why God Made the Radio (Capitol Records, 2012)

With Billy Vera

- Billy & the Beaters (Alfa, 1981)

=== Solo albums ===
- Speed of Heat (2022, BMG Records)
