= Gary Katz =

American record producer

Gary Katz is an American record producer, best known for his work on albums by Steely Dan. Katz has also produced numerous other recording artists and assisted in the discovery and signing of a number of subsequently successful acts. He has four Grammy nominations.

== Career ==
A lifelong music fan, Katz grew up in New York City listening to Chuck Berry and Fats Domino on a transistor radio. He had friends in the band Jay and the Americans who were his connection to the music business. The band worked with Jerry Leiber and Mike Stoller, who produced hit records for the Coasters and the Drifters. After Katz spent time with Leiber and Stoller in the studio, he realized he wanted to be a record producer. His first job after graduating from school was with singer Bobby Darin. Darin admired Bobby Kennedy, and when Kennedy was shot, Darin dropped out of music. Katz found work at Avco Embassy, but two years later the company closed. A friend in Los Angeles who was working for Dunhill Records suggested Katz write a letter to Jay Lasker, the head of Dunhill, to ask for a job. The letter amused Lasker, and he hired Katz.

Katz worked with The Mamas & the Papas, Steppenwolf, and Three Dog Night. Katz also has broad experience with A & R, responsible for artist signings such as Jim Croce, Chaka Khan, Rufus, and Jimmy Buffett.

Katz is most famous for his work as a producer on every Steely Dan album recorded during the first run of their career, from Can't Buy a Thrill in 1972 to Gaucho in 1980. He also produced The Nightfly, the first solo album by the band's lead vocalist Donald Fagen, in 1982.

The original cast album The Gospel at Colonus was produced by Bob Telson along with Fagen, Katz, and Daniel Lazarus.

Katz produced a remake of “Let’s Do It Again” by the Repercussions for All Men Are Brothers: A Tribute to Curtis Mayfield, with Curtis Mayfield singing the second verse while lying on his back in the recording studio.

Katz's other production credits include albums by Diana Ross, 10cc, Joe Cocker, The Alarm, Laura Nyro, Rosie Vela, Thomas Jefferson Kaye, Eye to Eye, Love and Money, Roger Christian, and Marc Jordan. He was a project manager for the alternative metal band Sevendust in 2005.

Katz had a joint venture with Interscope called Jake Records before moving to Warner Brothers as a producer and A&R man, where they enjoyed success as a company and creating new artists. He was one of two people responsible for signing Prince, Dire Straits, Christopher Cross, and Rickie Lee Jones to Warner Bros. He worked at the Burbank offices for six years, then at the New York offices for another four, alongside Jerry Wexler.

== Awards and honors ==
- Grammy Award nomination, Album of the Year, Aja by Steely Dan, 1977
- Grammy Award nomination, Album of the Year, Gaucho by Steely Dan, 1981
- Grammy Award nomination, Album of the Year, The Nightfly by Donald Fagen, 1982
- Grammy Award nomination, Producer of the Year, The Nightfly by Donald Fagen, 1982
