= Steely Dan discography =

- Studio albums: 9
- Live albums: 2
- Compilation albums: 12
- Singles: 22
- Video albums: 2
- Box sets: 2

The discography for the American rock band Steely Dan consists of nine studio albums, twenty one singles, two live albums, one live set on DVD, seven compilations and one box set in the United States. The band was originally active from 1971 to 1981 but later reformed in 1993 and continued to release studio and live material, with their most recent album issued in 2021.

Steely Dan album sales are estimated at forty million worldwide. Their best-selling album is 1977's Aja.

== Albums ==
=== Studio albums ===
Year	Album details	Peak chart positions										Certifications (sales threshold)
Year	Album details	US	AUS	CAN	FIN	GER	NL	NZ	NOR	SWE	UK	Certifications (sales threshold)
1972	Can't Buy a Thrill: Release date: November 1972; Label: ABC	17	46	4	—	84	—	—	—	—	38	RIAA: Platinum; BPI: Gold
1973	Countdown to Ecstasy: Release date: July 7, 1973; Label: ABC	35	—	49	—	—	—	—	—	—	—	RIAA: Gold
1974	Pretzel Logic: Release date: February 20, 1974; Label: ABC	8	18	5	—	—	—	23	—	—	37	RIAA: Platinum; BPI: Silver
1975	Katy Lied: Release date: March 24, 1975; Label: ABC	13	28	12	—	—	—	10	—	—	13	RIAA: Platinum; BPI: Silver
1976	The Royal Scam: Release date: May 31, 1976; Label: ABC	15	30	24	—	—	14	3	—	—	11	RIAA: Platinum; MC: Gold
1977	Aja: Release date: September 23, 1977; Label: ABC	3	9	3	—	—	9	3	10	35	5	RIAA: 2× Platinum; BPI: Gold; MC: 2× Platinum
1980	Gaucho: Release date: November 21, 1980; Label: MCA	9	9	18	—	57	44	7	5	15	27	RIAA: Platinum; ARIA: 2× Platinum; RMNZ: Gold
2000	Two Against Nature: Release date: February 29, 2000; Label: Giant	6	51	6	22	11	19	39	7	17	11	RIAA: Platinum; BPI: Silver; MC: Gold
2003	Everything Must Go: Release date: June 10, 2003; Label: Reprise	9	68	—	31	29	25	40	5	11	21	
"—" denotes releases that did not chart

=== Live albums ===
Year	Album details	Peak chart positions								Certification
Year	Album details	US	AUS	BEL	GER	NL	SWE	SWI	UK	Certification
1995	Alive in America: Release date: October 17, 1995; Label: Giant	40	—	—	—	74	41	—	62	
2021	Northeast Corridor: Steely Dan Live!: Release date: September 24, 2021; Label: Universal Music Enterprises	—	—	49	39	51	—	62	— (Note: Northeast Corridor: Steely Dan Live! didn't chart in the UK Album chart, it charted in the UK Albums Sales chart peaking at #31)	
"—" denotes releases that did not chart

=== Video albums ===
Year	Album details	Peak chart positions	Certification
Year	Album details	AUS	Certification
1999	Aja: Release date: 1999; Label: Classic Albums	34	ARIA: Gold
2000	Plush TV Jazz-Rock Party: Release date: June 13, 2000; Label: Image Entertainment	—	
"—" denotes releases that did not chart

=== Compilation albums ===
Year	Album details	Peak chart positions							Certifications (sales threshold)
Year	Album details	US	AUS	NL	NZ	NOR	SWE	UK	Certifications (sales threshold)
1978	Greatest Hits: Release date: November 30, 1978; Label: ABC	30	11	—	10	21	—	41	RIAA: Platinum; ARIA: Platinum
1978	Steely Dan: Release date: 1978; Label: ABC/Nippon Columbia	—	—	—	—	—	—	—	
1982	Gold: Release date: 1982; Label: MCA	115	—	—	—	30	—	44	RIAA: Gold
1985	A Decade of Steely Dan: Release date: 1985; Label: MCA	122	—	—	—	—	—	100	RIAA: Gold; BPI: Gold
1985	The Very Best of Steely Dan: Reelin' In the Years: Release date: October 1985; Label: MCA UK	—	—	—	—	—	—	43	BPI: Silver
1987	The Very Best of Steely Dan: Do It Again: Release date: October 1987; Label: Telstar	—	—	—	—	—	—	64	
1993	Remastered: The Best of Steely Dan – Then and Now: Release date: November 1993; Label: MCA	—	34	21	7	—	38	42	ARIA: Platinum
2000	Showbiz Kids: The Steely Dan Story, 1972–1980: Release date: November 14, 2000; Label: MCA/Universal Music TV	—	—	—	27	—	—	53	
2006	Steely Dan: The Definitive Collection: Release date: August 1, 2006; Label: Geffen	92	—	—	—	—	—	—	
2007	20th Century Masters – The Millennium Collection: The Best of Steely Dan: Release date: June 12, 2007; Label: Geffen	—	—	—	—	—	—	—	
2009	The Very Best of Steely Dan: Release date: June 30, 2009; Label: 101 Distribution	—	—	—	—	—	—	183	BPI: Gold
2009	Collected: Release date: August 11, 2009; Label: 101 Distribution	—	—	9	—	—	—	—	
"—" denotes releases that did not chart

=== Other albums ===
Year	Album details
2005	Marian McPartland's Piano Jazz with Steely Dan: Release date: March 15, 2005; Label: Geffen
2007	Found Studio Tracks: Release date: July 17, 2007; Label: Aspirion

== Box sets ==
Year	Album details	Certifications (sales threshold)
1982	Gold: Release date: 1982; Label: MCA	
1993	Citizen Steely Dan: Release date: December 14, 1993; Label: MCA	RIAA: Gold

== Singles ==
Year	Title	Chart positions							Album
Year	Title	US	US A/C	AUS	CAN	NL	NZ	UK	Album
1972	"Dallas"	—	—	—	—	—	—	—	Non-album single
1972	"Do It Again"	6	34	60	6	10	—	39 (Note: 1975 re-release)	Can't Buy a Thrill
1973	"Reelin' In the Years"	11	—	62	15	—	—	—	Can't Buy a Thrill
1973	"Show Biz Kids"	61	—	—	—	—	—	—	Countdown to Ecstasy
1973	"My Old School"	63	—	—	—	—	—	—	Countdown to Ecstasy
1974	"Rikki Don't Lose That Number"	4	15	30	3	18	—	58 (Note: 1979 re-release)	Pretzel Logic
1974	"Pretzel Logic"	57	—	—	48	—	—	—	Pretzel Logic
1975	"Black Friday"	37	—	—	36	—	—	—	Katy Lied
1975	"Bad Sneakers"	103	—	—	—	—	—	—	Katy Lied
1976	"Kid Charlemagne"	82	—	—	—	—	—	—	The Royal Scam
1976	"The Fez"	59	—	—	—	—	—	—	The Royal Scam
1976	"Haitian Divorce"	—	—	—	—	—	—	17	The Royal Scam
1977	"Peg"	11	30	—	7	—	—	—	Aja
1978	"Deacon Blues"	19	40	—	14	—	—	—	Aja
1978	"FM (No Static at All)"	22	—	87	19	—	19	49	FM: The Original Movie Soundtrack
1978	"Josie"	26	44	—	20	—	—	—	Aja
1980	"Hey Nineteen"	10	11	48	3	—	19	—	Gaucho
1981	"Time Out of Mind"	22	13	—	31	—	—	—	Gaucho
1999	"Cousin Dupree"	—	30	—	—	—	—	—	Two Against Nature
"—" denotes the single failed to chart

=== Promotional singles ===
Year	Single	Album
2000	"What a Shame About Me"	Two Against Nature
2000	"Jack of Speed"	Two Against Nature
2000	"Janie Runaway"	Two Against Nature
2003	"Things I Miss the Most"	Everything Must Go
2003	"Blues Beach"	Everything Must Go

== Tribute albums ==
- The Hoops McCann Band – Plays the Music of Steely Dan (1988)
- Garden Party – No Static at All: An Instrumental Tribute to Steely Dan (2000)
- Various artists – The Royal Dan: A Tribute to the Genius of Steely Dan (2006)
- Various artists – Maestros of Cool: A Tribute to Steely Dan (2006)
- Sara Isaksson & Rebecka Törnqvist – Fire in the Hole: Sara Isaksson & Rebecka Törnqvist Sing Steely Dan (2006)
