= The Best of Steely Dan: Then and Now =

Greatest hits album by Steely Dan
- Released: November 1993
- Recorded: 1972–1980
- Genre: Rock
- Length: 79:00
- Label: MCA
- Producer: Walter Becker, Donald Fagen

Steely Dan chronology
Citizen Steely Dan (1993)	The Best of Steely Dan: Then and Now (1993)	Showbiz Kids: The Steely Dan Story, 1972–1980 (2000)

Professional ratings
Review scores
Source	Rating
AllMusic	4.5/5 stars

The Best of Steely Dan: Then and Now is a compilation album by Steely Dan, released in 1993. The album cover is a photograph of Carhenge in Nebraska.

== Track listing ==
All songs written by Walter Becker and Donald Fagen.

1. "Reelin' in the Years" (from Can't Buy a Thrill, 1972) – 4:37
2. "Rikki Don't Lose That Number" (from Pretzel Logic, 1974) – 4:32
3. "Peg" (from Aja, 1977) – 3:56
4. "FM (No Static at All)" (non-album single from the FM soundtrack, 1978) – 5:05
5. "Hey Nineteen" (from Gaucho, 1980) – 5:04
6. "Deacon Blues" (from Aja, 1977) – 7:31
7. "Black Friday" (from Katy Lied, 1975) – 3:39
8. "Bodhisattva" (from Countdown to Ecstasy, 1973) – 5:17
9. "Do It Again" (from Can't Buy a Thrill, 1972) – 5:56
10. "Haitian Divorce" (from The Royal Scam, 1976) – 5:50
11. "My Old School" (from Countdown to Ecstasy, 1973) – 5:46
12. "Midnite Cruiser" (from Can't Buy a Thrill, 1972) – 4:07
13. "Babylon Sisters" (from Gaucho, 1980) – 5:50
14. "Kid Charlemagne" (from The Royal Scam, 1976) – 4:38
15. "Dirty Work" (from Can't Buy a Thrill, 1972) – 3:08
16. "Josie" (from Aja, 1977) – 4:30

== Charts ==
Chart (1993–94)	Peak position
Australian Albums (ARIA)	34
Dutch Albums (Album Top 100)	21
New Zealand Albums (RMNZ)	7
Swedish Albums (Sverigetopplistan)	38
UK Albums (OCC)	42

== Certifications ==
Region	Certification	Certified units/sales
Australia (ARIA)	Platinum	70,000^{^}
New Zealand (RMNZ)	Gold	7,500^{^}
^{^} Shipments figures based on certification alone.
