= Citizen Steely Dan =

Box set by Steely Dan
- Released: December 14, 1993
- Recorded: 1972–1980
- Genre: Rock
- Length: 287:02
- Label: MCA
- Producer: Gary Katz

Steely Dan chronology
The Very Best of Steely Dan: Do It Again (1987)	Citizen Steely Dan (1993)	The Best of Steely Dan: Then and Now (1993)

Professional ratings
Review scores
Source	Rating
Allmusic	3/5 stars

Citizen Steely Dan is a four-CD box set compilation album by Steely Dan, released in 1993.

== Overview ==
The set is a collection of all of Steely Dan's albums (up to 1980) in chronological order, and also contains a 1991 remix of the non-album single "FM (No Static at All)", a non-album B-side "Bodhisattva (Live)", 1978 Greatest Hits compilation only track "Here at the Western World", and a previously unreleased demo of "Everyone's Gone to the Movies" (a song from their 1975 album Katy Lied).

The set is not a complete compilation of every track released by Steely Dan up to 1993. Missing are both sides of the band's 1972 debut single ("Dallas" b/w "Sail the Waterway"), neither of which has ever been issued on CD, because of the band's dislike of the songs. The compilation was the first release of the remastered versions of Steely Dan's albums until the remastered studio albums were issued in 1998.

The first pressing features "Rikki Don't Lose That Number" using the single edit of the song. This version omits the flapamba intro. The second pressing of the box set features the version from the album, although it was reissued without any information noting the change.

Glenn Meadows remastered the CD set from the digital masters archived by Donald Fagen, Gary Katz and Roger Nichols in 1982. Early reports from engineer Roger Nichols stated that the original analog master tapes were in poor physical condition, leading to the use of his 1980s 3M digital transfers for this box set. However, this was contradicted during the 2022 Analogue Productions reissue project. Mastering engineer Bernie Grundman and producer Chad Kassem performed a physical audit of the tapes and confirmed that the masters for the first five albums remained in excellent, playable condition.

Additionally, original tape box documentation included Variable Speed Oscillator (VSO) instructions to adjust the speed and pitch of various tracks. While the original 1970s vinyl pressings followed these production notes, the digital transfers for the 1993 box set were mastered at a standard concert pitch of A440Hz. Modern reissues from 2022 onward have restored the intended pitch and timing documented on the tape boxes. For the albums Aja and Gaucho, where original flat masters were unavailable, the 2022 project utilized high-quality analog safety copies containing the original masterings of the respective albums.

== Track listing ==
All tracks are written by Walter Becker and Donald Fagen, except where noted.

Disc one
No.	Title	Origin	Length
1.	"Do It Again"	Can't Buy a Thrill (1972)	5:54
2.	"Dirty Work"	Can't Buy a Thrill	3:08
3.	"Kings"	Can't Buy a Thrill	3:45
4.	"Midnite Cruiser"	Can't Buy a Thrill	4:06
5.	"Only a Fool Would Say That"	Can't Buy a Thrill	2:55
6.	"Reelin' in the Years"	Can't Buy a Thrill	4:36
7.	"Fire in the Hole"	Can't Buy a Thrill	3:26
8.	"Brooklyn (Owes the Charmer Under Me)"	Can't Buy a Thrill	4:19
9.	"Change of the Guard"	Can't Buy a Thrill	3:38
10.	"Turn That Heartbeat Over Again"	Can't Buy a Thrill	4:58
11.	"Bodhisattva"	Countdown to Ecstasy (1973)	5:17
12.	"Razor Boy"	Countdown to Ecstasy	5:40
13.	"The Boston Rag"	Countdown to Ecstasy	3:10
14.	"Your Gold Teeth"	Countdown to Ecstasy	6:59
15.	"Show Biz Kids"	Countdown to Ecstasy	5:23
16.	"My Old School"	Countdown to Ecstasy	5:45
Total length:			73:29

Disc two
No.	Title	Writer(s)	Origin	Length
1.	"King of the World"		Countdown to Ecstasy	5:00
2.	"Pearl of the Quarter"		Countdown to Ecstasy	3:49
3.	"Rikki Don't Lose That Number" (single version)		Pretzel Logic (1974)	4:07
4.	"Night by Night"		Pretzel Logic	3:38
5.	"Any Major Dude Will Tell You"		Pretzel Logic	3:08
6.	"Barrytown"		Pretzel Logic	3:19
7.	"East St. Louis Toodle-oo"	Duke Ellington; Bubber Miley	Pretzel Logic	2:48
8.	"Parker's Band"		Pretzel Logic	2:43
9.	"Through with Buzz"		Pretzel Logic	1:32
10.	"Pretzel Logic"		Pretzel Logic	4:31
11.	"With a Gun"		Pretzel Logic	2:17
12.	"Charlie Freak"		Pretzel Logic	2:43
13.	"Monkey in Your Soul"		Pretzel Logic	2:34
14.	"Bodhisattva" (live)		B-side of "Hey Nineteen" single (1980)	7:41
15.	"Black Friday"		Katy Lied (1975)	3:40
16.	"Bad Sneakers"		Katy Lied	3:19
17.	"Rose Darling"		Katy Lied	3:03
18.	"Daddy Don't Live in That New York City No More"		Katy Lied	3:13
19.	"Doctor Wu"		Katy Lied	3:54
20.	"Everyone's Gone to the Movies"		Katy Lied	3:44
21.	"Chain Lightning"		Katy Lied	2:59
Total length:				73:42

Disc three
No.	Title	Writer(s)	Origin	Length
1.	"Your Gold Teeth II"		Katy Lied	4:12
2.	"Any World (That I'm Welcome To)"		Katy Lied	3:53
3.	"Throw Back the Little Ones"		Katy Lied	3:13
4.	"Kid Charlemagne"		The Royal Scam (1976)	4:37
5.	"The Caves of Altamira"		The Royal Scam	3:32
6.	"Don't Take Me Alive"		The Royal Scam	4:14
7.	"Sign in Stranger"		The Royal Scam	4:21
8.	"The Fez"	Becker; Fagen; Paul Griffin	The Royal Scam	3:58
9.	"Green Earrings"		The Royal Scam	4:05
10.	"Haitian Divorce"		The Royal Scam	5:48
11.	"Everything You Did"		The Royal Scam	3:54
12.	"The Royal Scam"		The Royal Scam	6:31
13.	"Here at the Western World"		Greatest Hits (1978)	4:00
14.	"Black Cow"		Aja (1977)	5:08
15.	"Aja"		Aja	8:00
16.	"Peg"		Aja	3:55
Total length:				73:21

Disc four
No.	Title	Writer(s)	Origin	Length
1.	"Deacon Blues"		Aja	7:33
2.	"Home at Last"		Aja	5:32
3.	"I Got the News"		Aja	5:04
4.	"Josie"		Aja	4:31
5.	"FM"		Remix, original version from FM: The Original Movie Soundtrack (1978)	5:05
6.	"Babylon Sisters"		Gaucho (1980)	5:48
7.	"Hey Nineteen"		Gaucho	5:07
8.	"Glamour Profession"		Gaucho	7:28
9.	"Gaucho"	Becker; Fagen; Keith Jarrett	Gaucho	5:30
10.	"Time Out of Mind"		Gaucho	4:11
11.	"My Rival"		Gaucho	4:30
12.	"Third World Man"		Gaucho	5:14
13.	"Everyone's Gone to the Movies" (demo)		Previously unreleased (1971)	3:57
Total length:				69:30

== Personnel ==
- Wayne Andre – trombone
- Jerome Aniton – speech/speaker/speaking part
- Patti Austin – vocals (background)
- Jeff Baxter – guitar, pedal steel, Spanish guitar
- Walter Becker – bass, guitar, harmonica, trumpet, bass (electric), flugelhorn, keyboards, vocals
- Joe Bellamy – assistant engineer
- Ben Benay – guitar (acoustic)
- Crusher Bennett – percussion
- Randy Brecker – trumpet, flugelhorn
- Ray Brown – bass (upright)
- Hiram Bullock – guitar
- Ed Caraeff – photography
- Larry Carlton – guitar
- Geary Chansley – research
- Pete Christlieb – flute, saxophone
- Gary Coleman – percussion
- Ronnie Cuber – sax (baritone)
- Rick Derringer – guitar, slide guitar
- Denny Dias – guitar, sitar (electric)
- Henry Diltz – photography
- Donald Fagen – organ, synthesizer, piano, piano (electric), vocals, vocals (background)
- Wilton Felder – bass
- Victor Feldman – percussion, marimba, vibraphone
- Michael Fennelly – vocals (background)
- Venetta Fields – vocals (background)
- Bob Findley – horn
- Chuck Findley – arranger, horn, brass
- Frank Floyd – vocals (background)
- Steve Gadd – drums
- Jerry Garszza – overdubs
- Gordon Grady – vocals (background)
- Diva Gray – vocals (background)
- Jay Graydon – guitar
- Ed Greene – drums
- Tom Greto – assistant engineer
- Paul Griffin – arranger, keyboards, piano (electric), vocals (background)
- Don Grolnick – arranger, keyboards, clavinet
- Lani Groves – vocals (background)
- Patricia Hall – vocals (background)
- Jimmie Haskell – arranger, orchestration
- Jim Hodder – percussion, drums, vocals
- Jim Horn – flute, saxophone
- Paul Humphrey – drums
- Slyde Hyde – horn, brass
- Barbara Isaak – assistant engineer
- Anthony Jackson – bass
- Plas Johnson – flute, horn, saxophone
- Royce Jones – percussion, vocals, vocals (background)
- Walter Kane – clarinet (bass)
- Howard Kaylan – vocals (background)
- Jackie Kelso – flute, saxophone
- Jim Keltner – percussion, drums
- Randall Kennedy – photography
- Steve Khan – guitar
- Clydie King – vocals (background)
- John Klemmer – horn
- Ken Klinger – assistant engineer
- Mark Knopfler – guitar
- Rebecca Louis – vocals (background)
- Johnny Mandel – arranger
- George Marge – clarinet (bass)
- Rick Marotta – drums
- Nicky Marrero – timbales
- Sherlie Mathews – vocals (background)
- Myrna Matthews – vocals (background)
- Lew McCreary – brass
- Michael McDonald – keyboards, vocals, vocals (background)
- Andy McKaie – coordination
- Leslie Miller – vocals (background)
- Jeff Mironov – guitar
- Lanny Morgan – saxophone
- Rob Mounsey – synthesizer, arranger
- Roger Nichols – sound effects, engineer, overdubs, executive engineer
- Michael Omartian – piano
- David Palmer – vocals, vocals (background)
- Ron Pangaliman – assistant engineer
- Dean Parks – guitar
- Barney Perkins – mixing
- Bill Perkins – saxophone
- Jeff Porcaro – drums
- Bernard "Pretty" Purdie – drums
- Ed Rack – assistant engineer
- Chuck Rainey – bass
- Elliott Randall – guitar
- Pat Rebillot – piano (electric)
- Jerome Richardson – sax (tenor)
- Lee Ritenour – guitar
- James Rolleston – vocals (background)
- John Rotella – saxophone
- Joe Sample – clarinet, piano (electric)
- David Sanborn – sax (alto)
- Zachary Sanders – vocals (background)
- Elliot Scheiner – engineer
- Timothy B. Schmit – vocals (background)
- Al Schmitt – engineer
- Bill Schnee – engineer
- Tom Scott – clarinet, flute, arranger, conductor, sax (alto), sax (tenor), Lyricon
- Wayne Shorter – flute, saxophone
- Valerie Simpson – vocals (background)
- Steely Dan – arranger
- Casey Syszik – vocals (background)
- Linda Tyler – assistant engineer
- Vartan – creative director
- Mark Volman – vocals (background)
- Florence Warner – vocals (background)
- Ernie Watts – saxophone
- Tim Weston – assistant engineer
- Toni Wine – vocals (background)
- Snooky Young – flugelhorn
