= Showbiz Kids: The Steely Dan Story, 1972–1980 =

Compilation album by Steely Dan
- Released: November 14, 2000; June 30, 2009 (re-released)
- Recorded: 1972–80
- Genre: Rock
- Length: 2:38:24
- Label: MCA Records
- Producer: Walter Becker, Donald Fagen

Steely Dan chronology
The Best of Steely Dan: Then and Now (1993)	Showbiz Kids: The Steely Dan Story, 1972–1980 (2000)	Steely Dan: The Definitive Collection (2006)

Showbiz Kids: The Steely Dan Story, 1972–1980 is a two-disc compilation album by Steely Dan, released in 2000.

The compilation was re-released in the UK in 2009 under the title The Very Best of Steely Dan.

Professional ratings
Review scores
Source	Rating
Allmusic	link

== Track listing ==
All songs by Walter Becker and Donald Fagen, unless otherwise noted.

=== Disc one ===
No.	Title	Original album	Length
1.	"Do It Again"	Can't Buy a Thrill, 1972	5:56
2.	"Dirty Work"	Can't Buy a Thrill	3:08
3.	"Reelin' in the Years"	Can't Buy a Thrill	4:37
4.	"Only a Fool Would Say That"	Can't Buy a Thrill	2:57
5.	"Change of the Guard"	Can't Buy a Thrill	3:39
6.	"Bodhisattva"	Countdown to Ecstasy, 1973	5:18
7.	"The Boston Rag"	Countdown to Ecstasy	5:40
8.	"Show Biz Kids"	Countdown to Ecstasy	5:26
9.	"My Old School"	Countdown to Ecstasy	5:46
10.	"Rikki Don't Lose That Number"	Pretzel Logic, 1974	4:32
11.	"Night by Night"	Pretzel Logic	3:40
12.	"Pretzel Logic"	Pretzel Logic	4:32
13.	"Any Major Dude Will Tell You"	Pretzel Logic	3:08
14.	"Black Friday"	Katy Lied, 1975	3:41
15.	"Bad Sneakers"	Katy Lied	3:21
16.	"Doctor Wu"	Katy Lied	3:55
17.	"Any World (That I'm Welcome To)"	Katy Lied	3:55
18.	"Chain Lightning"	Katy Lied	2:59

=== Disc two ===
No.	Title	Original album	Length
1.	"Kid Charlemagne"	The Royal Scam, 1976	4:38
2.	"Don't Take Me Alive"	The Royal Scam	4:16
3.	"Haitian Divorce"	The Royal Scam	5:51
4.	"The Fez" (Becker, Fagen, Paul Griffin)	The Royal Scam	4:02
5.	"Here at the Western World"	Greatest Hits, 1978	4:01
6.	"Black Cow"	Aja, 1977	5:10
7.	"Aja"	Aja	8:00
8.	"Deacon Blues"	Aja	7:36
9.	"Peg"	Aja	4:00
10.	"Josie"	Aja	4:35
11.	"FM"	Remix, originally from the FM: The Original Movie Soundtrack, 1978	5:06
12.	"Babylon Sisters"	Gaucho, 1980	5:49
13.	"Hey Nineteen"	Gaucho	5:07
14.	"Time Out of Mind"	Gaucho	4:12
15.	"Third World Man"	Gaucho	5:13
