= The Definitive Collection (Steely Dan album) =

Greatest hits album by Steely Dan
- Released: August 1, 2006
- Recorded: 1972–2003
- Genre: Rock
- Length: 77:34
- Label: Geffen
- Producers: Walter Becker, Donald Fagen

Steely Dan chronology
Showbiz Kids: The Steely Dan Story, 1972-1980 (2000)	The Definitive Collection (2006)	20th Century Masters – The Millennium Collection: The Best of Steely Dan (2007)

Professional ratings
Review scores
Source	Rating
AllMusic	3.5/5 stars

The Definitive Collection is a compilation album by American rock band Steely Dan, released in 2006. It is the first compilation that draws from all of their albums and covers their entire career.

== Track listing ==
All songs written and composed by Walter Becker and Donald Fagen.

No.	Title	Original album	Length
1.	"Do It Again"	Can't Buy a Thrill, 1972	5:57
2.	"Dirty Work"	Can't Buy a Thrill, 1972	3:10
3.	"Reelin' in the Years"	Can't Buy a Thrill, 1972	4:37
4.	"Bodhisattva"	Countdown to Ecstasy, 1973	5:18
5.	"My Old School"	Countdown to Ecstasy, 1973	5:45
6.	"Rikki Don't Lose That Number"	Pretzel Logic, 1974	4:32
7.	"Black Friday"	Katy Lied, 1975	3:39
8.	"Bad Sneakers"	Katy Lied, 1975	3:20
9.	"Kid Charlemagne"	The Royal Scam, 1976	4:39
10.	"Deacon Blues"	Aja, 1977	7:32
11.	"Peg"	Aja, 1977	3:55
12.	"FM (No Static at All)"	FM: The Original Movie Soundtrack, 1978	4:50
13.	"Hey Nineteen"	Gaucho, 1980	5:05
14.	"Babylon Sisters"	Gaucho, 1980	5:51
15.	"Cousin Dupree"	Two Against Nature, 2000	5:27
16.	"Things I Miss the Most"	Everything Must Go, 2003	3:57

== Charts ==
Chart (2006)	Peak position
US Billboard 200	92
