= The Very Best of Steely Dan: Reelin' In the Years =

Greatest hits album by Steely Dan
- Released: October 1985
- Recorded: 1972–1980
- Genre: Rock
- Label: MCA Records
- Producers: Walter Becker, Donald Fagen

Steely Dan chronology
A Decade of Steely Dan (1985)	The Very Best of Steely Dan: Reelin' In the Years (1985)	The Very Best of Steely Dan: Do It Again (1987)

The Very Best of Steely Dan: Reelin' in the Years is a compilation album by Steely Dan released in 1985.

== Track listing ==
All songs are written and composed by Walter Becker and Donald Fagen, except where noted.

Side one
No.	Title	Album taken from	Length
1.	"Do It Again"	Can't Buy a Thrill, 1972	5:51
2.	"Reelin' in the Years"	Can't Buy a Thrill	4:35
3.	"My Old School"	Countdown to Ecstasy, 1973	5:45
4.	"Bodhisattva"	Countdown to Ecstasy	5:18

Side two
No.	Title	Album taken from	Length
1.	"Show Biz Kids"	Countdown to Ecstasy	5:20
2.	"Rikki Don't Lose That Number"	Pretzel Logic, 1974	4:34
3.	"Pretzel Logic"	Pretzel Logic	4:30
4.	"Black Friday"	Katy Lied, 1975	3:39
5.	"Bad Sneakers"	Katy Lied	3:17

Side three
No.	Title	Album taken from	Length
1.	"Doctor Wu"	Katy Lied	3:53
2.	"Haitian Divorce"	The Royal Scam, 1976	5:48
3.	"Kid Charlemagne"	The Royal Scam	4:29
4.	"The Fez" (Becker, Fagen, Paul Griffin)	The Royal Scam	3:54

Side four
No.	Title	Album taken from	Length
1.	"Peg"	Aja, 1977	3:54
2.	"Josie"	Aja	4:30
3.	"Deacon Blues"	Aja	7:26
4.	"Hey Nineteen"	Gaucho, 1980	5:04
5.	"Babylon Sisters"	Gaucho	5:51
