= Aja (song) =

1977 song by Steely Dan

Song by Steely Dan

from the album Aja
- Released: September 23, 1977
- Recorded: 1977
- Studio: The Village Recorder, Los Angeles
- Genre: Jazz rock; jazz fusion; progressive jazz; progressive rock
- Length: 7:56
- Label: ABC
- Songwriters: Donald Fagen; Walter Becker
- Producer: Gary Katz

"Aja" is a song by the American rock band Steely Dan, from their sixth studio album Aja, released in 1977. It has been described as jazz rock, jazz fusion, progressive jazz and progressive rock. Writers Walter Becker and Donald Fagen play guitar and synthesizer, respectively, with session musicians playing the other parts. Fagen sings lead vocals. Production duties were handled by Gary Katz; the album was released through ABC Records.

Musically, it is tonally sophisticated and a structurally complex work that was praised upon release as the most ambitious track the duo had ever attempted. The song's lyrics voice the interior monologue of a man who runs to the title character to escape the stresses of his life "up on the hill." Fagen claimed that it was inspired by the relative of an acquaintance, who had married a Korean woman named Aja. He has described the song as being about the "tranquility that can come of a quiet relationship with a beautiful woman."

Despite its complexity, and unlike most of the other tracks on the album, it took less than a day to record the basic rhythm track for "Aja", which Steely Dan credited to the musicians' quick learning, without long rehearsals. Denny Dias' guitar work, including a solo, marked the last appearance on a Steely Dan record by any other founding member of the group. On the other hand, it marked the first appearances of saxophonist Wayne Shorter and drummer Steve Gadd with Steely Dan. Both played solos during the instrumental break which came to be considered among their finest work; Gadd's, the first drum solo in a Steely Dan song, was recorded in just two takes. Jazz critic Ben Sidran later called the recording session "a moment when ... pop music suddenly took a turn left."

"Aja" is the longest song the band recorded before they disbanded in 1981, (Note: It was later surpassed by "West of Hollywood" from Two Against Nature, at over 8 minutes.) running approximately eight minutes. Fagen and Becker performed it in concert after they reunited late in the 20th century and began touring again. They released one live version on the album Alive in America. Many artists, including Woody Herman, have covered it on Steely Dan tribute albums.

== Background ==
Songwriters Walter Becker and Donald Fagen had formed Steely Dan in 1972 as a rock quintet, with Becker playing bass and Fagen on keyboards. Even on the group's first album, Can't Buy a Thrill, the two had been willing to feature contributions from outside session musicians such as guitarist Elliott Randall. After their third album, 1974's Pretzel Logic, they decided to stop touring to focus on songwriting; the other three members were dismissed, although guitarist Denny Dias continued working with Becker and Fagen on occasional tracks. The following album, Katy Lied, relied largely on various assortments of studio musicians, and showed more of the influence of the jazz the two had listened to during their formative years.

By the time Becker and Fagen began writing and recording the sixth Steely Dan album, Aja, in 1977, they felt comfortable enough to focus on their songwriting. "We were feeling really lucky that year," Becker said in the 1999 Classic Albums documentary on the album, "and wanted to try something longer." He describes "Aja" as a suite that combined several other songs they were working on, including an early demo song called "Stand by the Seawall".

During the same interview, Fagen called the song "a journey in time and space." He has long claimed it was named after a South Korean woman a high school friend's brother married after serving in the Army in that country. He is not sure about the spelling, however. "We thought that was a good name, a very romantic sort of image," Fagen said, "the sort of tranquility that can come of a quiet relationship with a beautiful woman."

== Recording ==
The song was recorded during the early 1977 Aja sessions at The Village Recorder in Los Angeles. Gary Katz produced the song, as he had for every Steely Dan song. Roger Nichols and three other recording engineers were present, work for which they would share that year's Grammy Award for Best Engineered Non-Classical Recording.

Aja was Steely Dan's first album to give credit to the musicians on each individual track. There were three guitarists on the track: Larry Carlton, Becker, and Dias. Carlton had played some guitar solos on the band's previous album, The Royal Scam, and done arrangements for Aja; Dias had played in bands with them before becoming one of the founding members of Steely Dan. Parts of performances by all three were edited together into the final mix. In the 1999 Classic Albums segment on Aja, Dias recalled the song as being particularly challenging for the guitarists, claiming that "its very existence is a contradiction. I mean, when have you ever heard a song on a rock'n'roll record that absolutely cannot be played on a guitar?" Specifically, he cited "clusters where the notes are so close together that you can't stretch your fingers far enough to get all the notes out at the same time ... [and] open voicings that are so wide apart that you can't reach the notes." The final recording used much of his work, including the long solo during the song's instrumental break; it was his last appearance with Steely Dan, and thus the last appearance of any of the group's original members besides Becker and Fagen on their records. Becker's blues phrases are used over the next statement of the main theme.

Fagen sang "Aja"'s lead vocals, with Timothy B. Schmit, who had just left Poco to join the Eagles, backing him up. Fagen also played the minimal synthesizer parts the song required, as well as some toots of a police whistle during the instrumental break. He left the bulk of the keyboard parts to others; Joe Sample played the electric piano while Michael Omartian, who was amazed that Becker and Fagen had abandoned the "totally cool" "Stand by the Seawall", handled acoustic piano. Chuck Rainey played bass guitar. Becker and Fagen had reportedly hoped to get Tony Williams, a member of Miles Davis' Second Great Quintet, to play drums, but settled instead for Steve Gadd. Percussionist and pianist Victor Feldman, who would join Becker and Fagen in contributing to every song on the album, provided marimba parts.

Three music stands were required to hold the chart for each player in the rhythm section; despite that complexity, the song took very little time to record, in contrast to the other songs on Aja, all of which were simpler. (Note: Most famously, six other guitarists besides Becker attempted the solo on "Peg" before Jay Graydon was finally able to satisfy him and Fagen.) Originally, they planned to rehearse for a day before beginning to record, but changed their mind after one performance. "Steve Gadd, being a fantastic drummer, is a fantastic sight reader and didn't really need to rehearse; neither did the rest of the band," Becker told Steely Dan historian Brian Sweet in 2007. Michael Omartian, who played piano on the session, remembers things differently, describing three hours of rehearsals before recording started. Bill Schnee, the engineer on the album, commented about the basic tracking sessions that "We rehearsed this song more than any other song".

=== Drum solo ===
Gadd, whose part had designated sections where he was to improvise, took two takes to record his part (including the first drum solos on a Steely Dan record), not one as is sometimes claimed; they were edited together in the final mix. "[His] part was not written. We discussed the tune a little bit and by virtue of his musicianship he just knew what to do," said Becker. He recalls "telling him just to play like hell" through the part that became the saxophone solo.

"The session went real smooth," Gadd told jazz critic Ben Sidran in 1995. "Everyone had their head into it like probably it was going to take a long time to get it, if we ever would get it. And, that day, it just seemed to fall into place." Ten years later, he elaborated further that he had heard of Becker and Fagen's difficulties and "[a] lot of the musicians weren't very optimistic that they were ever going to get these things done."

According to Sweet, Gadd's playing was so visually appealing that some of the other players became distracted and had to rerecord portions of their parts later.

=== Saxophone solo ===
Drum and sax solos
The first half of Gadd and Shorter's solos

With everything else laid down, only the tenor saxophone solo remained. As part of their conscious effort to expand the range of musicians they worked with, Becker and Fagen hoped to have it played by Wayne Shorter, who had also been a member of Davis' Second Great Quintet and later backed him on the pioneering fusion albums In a Silent Way and Bitches Brew. At the time, Shorter had worked only on jazz records.

Katz asked Shorter on Becker and Fagen's behalf if he would play the solo, and he declined. They then asked Dick LaPalm, then manager of the Village Recorder, who knew Shorter from when Weather Report, the prominent fusion band he had co-founded with Joe Zawinul, recorded there. LaPalm agreed, and according to Fagen "vouched for us" to Shorter. They sent the saxophonist a chart. When Shorter came to the studio, he prepared by playing scales on the piano for a half hour, then doing three or four takes. "We were very glad that he came in," Fagen said in 1999. "I think he felt the chances were that we would be asking him to do something that was not particularly appropriate [for him], which was, well, a reasonable fear under those circumstances," Becker added.

Shorter recalled his decision to play the solo as "quite matter-of-fact". When he came in, he simply asked to hear the sections before and after the portion he would be soloing over so he would have a reference point. "He was a little worried, getting into how he would play with Miles," Fagen said. "Of course that didn't bother us at all." Shorter explained that the lesson he had taken from Davis was to focus on his performance and "don't give too much away."

Shorter "play[ed] to the homonymic meaning of the tune's title ... with a certain chant-like quality resonant of the Orient," wrote his biographer Michelle Mercer. "But mostly he related to the music itself." She quotes Becker:

He was very thoughtful and probing about the musical possibilities ... Wayne said that as a jazz musician there could be a stage where you'd see a certain harmonic thing going on and react to that in a programmed way. There could be a certain boilerplate aspect of the bebop language, a way of looking at chromatic passages. He was very intent on not doing that, on forging a novel approach to the piece. He was influenced by the contour of sections other than the part he played over.

Mercer notes that there wasn't much of that "bebop language" in the music underneath, despite the richness of the underlying chord. "Even so," she concludes, "Wayne managed to tell a blockbuster story in just one minute". She credits Gadd for inspiring him much as Tony Williams had when he and Shorter played in Davis's band. "It was majestic and stately, tracing a mountainous arc with cleverly displaced references back to the vocal melody."

=== Missing master tape ===
In the late 1990s, when Becker and Fagen were putting together a remastered version of the album as part of a series of reissues on compact disc, they found that the original two-inch multitrack master tapes of "Aja" and "Black Cow" were both missing, precluding a version of either song in 5.1 surround sound. In the confusion after the completion of the album, those masters were not stored with the others, they wrote in the liner notes that accompanied the reissue. They offered a $600 reward to anyone who found them and contacted their management: "This is not a joke. Happy hunting."

== Composition ==
Canadian studio musician Don Breithaupt, who wrote the 2007 volume on Aja for Bloomsbury Publishing's 33 1/3 series, breaks the song down into 24 separate parts. "It conforms more to sonata form than Sinatra form," he writes. This complex musical structure is in contrast to the lyrics—three short verses, all beginning with the same line, and with the same chorus.

=== Lyrics ===
Like many Steely Dan songs, the lyrics of "Aja" are sung from the point of view of a character in a narrative, rather than a universal first person. "Aja" is the sparsely worded interior monologue of a man who contrasts the shortcomings of his regimented and passionless regular life with the space occupied, at some remove, by Aja, who he visits as a relief from his primary existence. While many interpretations of the song follow Fagen's account of its origins and assume Aja is a woman, "the word seems to be shorthand for peace, exotica, the alluring other, perhaps even death," writes Breithaupt. "The lyrics paint Aja as a nonspecific, though certainly eastern, place far from the worlds of celebrity, commerce, even linear time—a place in which a troubled spirit might find solace."

Each verse starts with the same four-syllable line, "Up on the hill ..." which is not rhymed with any other line in the song. The narrator makes a complaint about the emptiness of life there in the next two similarly short but rhyming lines—"people never stare / They just don't care", in the first verse, for example. His mood picks up in the second half-verse as the lines more than double in length, continuing to rhyme, describing some soothing aspect of the space—particularly the "Chinese music" playing there, in both the first and third verses—inhabited by Aja. These flow right into the three-line chorus, with the same lyric all three times:

Aja,
When all my dime dancin' is through,
I run to you.

Despite the lyrics' minimal presence in the song, Breithaupt finds Becker and Fagen using many of the same poetic devices as they do in other, more lyrically complex such as "Deacon Blues", from Aja, and their other albums. Most significant is the repetition of sounds. Alliteration, the use of the same initial sound in consecutive words, is present in the chorus's "dime dancin'". This is complemented by assonance, vowel sounds that recur in close proximity, in addition to those used in the song's rhyme scheme. Three long vowel sounds cluster in the verses:

- Long "a" (/eɪ/)—"they think I'm okay/Or so they say";
- Long "e" (/i/)—"Chinese music under banyan trees ... always sets me free",
- Long "i" (/aɪ/)—"in the sky tonight".

The first sound is also the initial sound of the chorus, and the last sound recurs in the chorus: "my dime ... I run ...", joined by a repeated long "u" (/oʊ/): "through ... to you") Assonance is combined with consonance, a repeated consonant sound, as well: the combination of the short "a" (/æ/) and "n" (/n/) recurs throughout the verses ("banyan", "ranch", and "angular banjoes") and then in the chorus's "dancin'".

The Asian references in the lyrics, the "Chinese music" and "banyan trees", are part of an ongoing motif in Steely Dan's music, Breihaupt also points out. It begins with "Yellow Peril", a song that was written by Becker and Fagen before the formation of Steely Dan but never formally recorded, and continues with "Bodhisattva", the first single from their second album, Countdown to Ecstasy, which not only took its name from a position of respect in Buddhism but punningly referenced "The shine of your Japan / The sparkle of your china" in its lyrics; elsewhere on Countdown to Ecstasy, "Your Gold Teeth" refers to "Tobacco they grow in Peking ..." Katy Lied, in 1975, included a song about a "Doctor Wu." Two years after Aja, Gaucho had three in two songs. "Time out of Mind", the album's second single, references a "mystical sphere ... direct from Lhasa / Where people are rolling in the snow / Far from the world we know". In another song, "Glamour Profession", the narrator refers to another character's "Eurasian bride" and later describes having "Szechuan dumplings" at Mr Chow in Los Angeles.

According to Breithaupt, one repetitive device in "Aja" is unique to it among the album's songs. The use of "Up on the hill" to begin each verse is anaphora, the repetition of a word or group of words at the beginning of a larger grouping of words. It is reinforced by the "Chinese music" that begins the fourth line of the first and third verses.

Also atypical for Steely Dan is the extensive imagery of natural features in the lyrics—hill, trees, sea, and sky. Most Steely Dan songs, and indeed all of the other songs on the album except "Home at Last", eschew natural imagery in favor of name-checking brands, products, businesses, and other human-made artifices. Indeed, Breithaupt notes, "Aja" has none of the brand names or particular locations that often appear in the band's other lyrics, adding to the sense of timelessness in the lyrics, although Breithaupt implies that the "dude ranch above the sea" might be a sardonic reference to Los Angeles.

Due to the vagueness of the lyrics, some listeners have struggled to interpret the song. Winston Cook-Wilson of Spin suggested on the album's 40th anniversary that "It's possible that... 'Aja' is a romantic fantasy in the mind of a patient in some Magic-Mountain-like mental hospital." The double helix in the sky could be a constellation or hallucination, and, Cook-Wilson posited, the "hardware" either drug paraphernalia or a gun. After reviewing some of the theories as to what the song might be about on a website devoted to interpreting the band's lyrics, Breithaupt concluded that the only good answer to "what is 'Aja' about?" is "about eight minutes", referring to the song's length.

=== Music ===
Following what Breithaupt calls a "discernible musical logic" to the order of the album's songs, most of "Aja" is in the key of B major, one whole step up from A major, in which the previous track, "Black Cow", ends. With the exception of occasional measures, the song is in 4/4, or common time.

"Aja" begins slowly, with a Bmaj13 chord from Omartian. (Note: Musicologist Walter Everett identified this as the band's signature mu chord. However, as described by the band themselves, the mu major chord consists only of the 1st, 2nd, major 3rd and 5th and never contains a major 7th)) He plays variations on this harmony for the first eight bars while Gadd quietly works the cymbals, and bent guitar phrases and Joe Sample's Rhodes piano (with delay and slight tremolo), sound above the chords. Breithaupt calls this intro an unusual "area of harmonic tranquility" in the album. Between the pianos and guitar, "there are sharp elevenths floating around, hinting at the wilder (and less stable) Lydian mode."

After eight measures, Fagen's lead vocals enter and Gadd starts laying down the still-slow beat with his hi-hat, bass and snare, still low in the mix. This continues for ten measures; during a short break after the vocals stop, Feldman's marimba enters.

First half-verse and chorus
The passage that ends on the Neapolitan sixth

The beat picks up, guitars join the rhythm section, and the tempo gets slightly faster, just before the second half-verse begins, with Gadd and Feldman combining for a groove with a Latin feel. This section concludes after eight bars with a short flourish of piano chords; the beat continues into the chorus. That chorus, Breithaupt notes, ends on a descent from D♭maj7♭5 to Cmaj7♭5, one of many half-step chord changes on the album. The last word, "you" sounds on a single measure in 3/4. In a 2004 Music Theory Spectrum article, Walter Everett notes that the resolution at the end of the chorus is one of many bebop-inspired unexpected chord changes in Becker and Fagen's work:

Here, at the end of the chorus, a French-like V4/3 with a typically lowered fifth and an unusual major seventh is applied to the Neapolitan instead of to the dominant. This abstruse event creates an appropriately exotic quality, and the offhand giving way of the tonicized C to the true tonic, B, has an ironic quality owing to the nested double use of lowered second scale degree (D♭_{3} to C_{3}, then C_{3} to B_{2})

"Moments like [this]", Spin wrote, "leave one totally adrift for clues as to where the song will move". After a single reiteration of the intro's four bars, the song goes into the second verse and chorus, which do not change significantly.

The Neapolitan sixth chord Everett highlighted at the end of the chorus is held for two measures, creating a short break before the beginning of the instrumental section. The pace picks up, Gadd and Feldman combine for an even more Latin beat, and Fagen enters as a player, leading an eight-bar vamp with a brassy riff on his synthesizer. A few bars in, Feldman begins playing the section's main melody on his vibraphone, beginning an 8-bar instrumental bridge that includes one bar in 2/4. It is followed by a 10-bar variation on the bridge. Both these sections, rather than repeating the chords of the verse and chorus, introduce new material for the rhythm part, the reason for the three music stands required for each player during the session. "Becker and Fagen were not content to have their soloists simply noodling on verse changes or one-chord vamps. This made for very few repeat signs," writes Breithaupt.

This leads to a short interlude in which the vamp gives way to chord flourishes punctuated by beats from Gadd in between soft cymbal taps. Through it all, Dias plays a jazzy solo of long runs on clean-toned guitar, while the rhythm guitar plays cluster triads, including add2 or "mu" chords. Near the end is another segment of chromatically descending chords (Fm11, Em11, E♭m11 and Dm11). "Aja was Becker and Fagen's half-step album," Breithaupt writes. While that went against the prevailing trends in popular music at that time, in which diatonic progressions or vamps were preferred, he quotes Fagen as saying that even though he had always thought that was "corny ... I think I decided I was going to do it anyway. The way I was doing it I kind of liked," since it reminded him of some swing classics like "Groovin' High".

The 12-bar interlude ends as the vamp returns for four bars, over which Becker plays a bluesier solo on an overdriven guitar. Fagen adds accents at one point with two toots of a police whistle. The bridge is replayed, while the solo continues. When the interlude returns, it too is slightly varied, lasting 16 bars, with the clean-tone guitar returning conspicuously in the final measures as the chords build to a crescendo, announcing the combined Gadd/Shorter drum and tenor saxophone solo. The first part goes on for 17 bars, one in 2/4, as the other musicians vamp on staccato chords beneath. The interlude chords briefly return, and Gadd resumes keeping the beat, with a few more flourishes, while Shorter's solo continues. Then the vamp and drum solo resume for another 17-bar section, this one including one bar in 3/4, that ends with a descending chord progression that takes us back into the intro.

After the 26 bars of the verse and chorus repeat, the band resumes the Bm11 vamp that backed the solos in the instrumental break. This continues for 34 bars while the song fades out. Fagen plays synthesizer fills while Gadd continues his solo, more in the tradition of jazz drum solos than rock. "Gadd peppered the rhythmic grid with short, complex bursts of activity, including several signature sixteenth-note triplet figures incorporating the kick drum and toms", Breithaupt writes. "He helped signal to the pop world that Becker and Fagen, the kings of wry understatement, were not averse to a little untethered improvisation." In a 2013 video for the Hudson Music Master Series, he demonstrated his variations on the ratamacue during the tag.

== Release and reception ==
"Aja" was released as part of the eponymous album in September 1977; it would soon reach No. 3 in the Billboard album charts and become Steely Dan's first platinum album. Its liner notes, from two different writers, both took the time to praise the title track. The longer set, purportedly written by music journalist "Michael Phalen" a pseudonym for Becker and Fagen, called "Aja" a "rather ambitious work in which a Latin-tinged pop song is inexplicably expanded into some sort of sonata or suite. The result is a rambling eight-minute epic highlighted by Wayne Shorter's stately, rhapsodic solo which descends gracefully into a recapitulation of the vocal theme. The sensitive, sometimes explosive performance by drummer Steve Gadd may be his finest recorded work to date."

An actual critic, Rolling Stone's Michael Duffy, saw it much the same way. "Aja", he wrote, was "the one song ... that shows real growth in Becker's and Fagen's songwriting capabilities and departs from their previous work." Musically he characterized it as having "vaguely Oriental instrumental flourishes" and "an opiated jazz flux" in the lyrics. "'Aja' may prove to be the farthest Becker and Fagen can take certain elements of their musical ambition."

A Billboard reviewer, too, noted the Latin tinge to the music and called Shorter's solo "nothing less than dreamy." Gadd's drumming came in for praise; the reviewer also noted that "Fagen's mellow vocals are at their best."

== Legacy ==
While "Aja" has not been played as frequently on the radio as the album's three singles—"Deacon Blues", "Peg" and "Josie"—it has become a staple of Steely Dan's live shows since the band resumed touring in the 1990s. Stewart Mason of AllMusic calls it "an absolute masterpiece, not only one of Steely Dan's finest songs, but also a pinnacle of '70s studio rock." Critic and John Lennon biographer Tim Riley recommends "Aja" as one of ten Steely Dan songs with which to introduce "non-believers" to the band. Likewise, AXS TV's Sam McPherson lists it as the best Steely Dan song. "You can listen to it on 'repeat' all day long ... or all night long, depending on your preferences, of course," he wrote in 2014. "It fits the 'cocktail lounge' vibe of the band's sound, while also being positively upbeat and charming at the same time."

In 2016, Ruban Nielson of Unknown Mortal Orchestra, a longtime Steely Dan fan, listed "Aja" among the band's five most essential songs for a show on Fordham University radio station WFUV. He called it "a really strange and beautiful arrangement." The outro's layered use of synthesizers evoked, to him, the work of David Bowie and Brian Eno.

Shorter's solo, "suitable for bronzing", in biographer Michell Mercer's words, and "the purest jazz Steely Dan ever recorded," to AllMusic, is frequently mentioned as part of the song's lasting appeal. "It's so full of drama and mystery it makes you wonder what's going on in his mind", said Nielson. "Many people will have heard his great solo on Steely Dan's classic song 'Aja'," British critic Ivan Hewett wrote in a 2013 profile, "without knowing it comes from one of the great tenor and soprano saxophonists in jazz history." Mercer says that "for years afterwards, people approached him and said they'd first heard him on this record."

Brian Sweet of the Library of Congress cited Shorter's "masterful tenor solo" on "Aja" as one of the album's highlights when the library added Aja to the United States National Recording Registry in 2010. Jazz.com critic Matt Miller includes "Aja" on his list of the 12 essential Shorter tracks. In 2013, Chicago radio station WXRT-FM included it among its ten most memorable sax solos in rock."

Gadd's work on the track has also been influential. "Even the best part of three decades after it was recorded, drummers are still listening to 'Aja' in awe," said Richard Chamberlain of Rhythm magazinein 2010. AllMusic calls his solo over the tag "one of the least boring drum solos ever to appear on a '70s rock album." Nate Chinen at Jazz Times put "Aja" among Gadd's five best tracks in 2013, calling it "a pop music legend". On the album's 40th anniversary, Spin's Cook-Wilson called the solo "the beating heart of the album" and Nielson describes it as "both spectacular and 'spectacular'".

Jazz writer Ben Sidran considers "Aja" a seminal recording. "It was a moment when pop music got extended by virtue of the drums you played," he told Gadd in his oral history, Talking Jazz. "That session, at the time, was kind of legendary ... [I]t was important because pop music suddenly took a turn left."

Aja Brown, the former mayor of Compton, California, was named after the song, since her mother was a fan. In 2020, A'ja Wilson, that year's WNBA MVP with the Las Vegas Aces, told an interviewer on NPR's Wait Wait... Don't Tell Me! that she was named for the song because it was her father's favorite.

== Versions ==
Since Aja's release, the song has appeared on two compilations, both from the compact disc era: the 1993 Citizen Steely Dan four-CD box set and the 2000 two-disc collection Showbiz Kids: The Steely Dan Story, 1972–1980. Both versions differ from the original release only in having an extended fadeout. While the first compilation included many remastered versions of other Steely Dan songs, and remastered entire earlier albums were released later in the 1990s, no remastered version of "Aja" that would take advantage of modern audio technology has been possible due to the disappearance of the multitrack master tapes.

A live version was recorded when Becker and Fagen began touring again as Steely Dan in 1994. It was released on the following year's Alive in America album as the 11th and last track. At slightly over nine minutes, it the longest track ever recorded by Steely Dan.

In 2009, the band's "Rent Party" tour included shows where they played one of their albums in its entirety. One run of shows, performed that August at the Beacon Theatre in New York, was devoted to Aja. New York Times' critic Ben Ratliff praised saxophonist Walt Weiskopf's work on the title track as "suggest[ing] the roaming, gestural feel of Wayne Shorter's original solo."

== Personnel ==
Credits adapted from the album liner notes and Donald Breithaupt's book:

- Donald Fagen – lead vocals, synthesizer, police whistle
- Steve Gadd – drums
- Victor Feldman – percussion, vibraphone
- Chuck Rainey – bass guitar
- Walter Becker, Denny Dias and Larry Carlton – guitars
- Michael Omartian – piano
- Joe Sample – electric piano
- Wayne Shorter – tenor saxophone
- Timothy B. Schmit – backing vocals

== Covers ==
Cover versions of "Aja" have largely been recorded as part of early 21st-century multi-song tributes to Steely Dan.

- Woody Herman on Chick, Donald, Walter and Woodrow, 1978
- Christian McBride, on SciFi, 2000.
- Various artists, including Peter Wolf and Al Di Meola, on The Royal Dan: A Tribute, 2006
- The Jim Mullen Organ Trio featuring Stan Sulzmann, Smokescreen, 2007
- The Darcys, on AJA, their rerecording of the entire album, 2012.
- The Mark Masters Ensemble, on Everything You Did: The Music of Walter Becker and Donald Fagen, 2013.

== Samples ==
Shortly after the conclusion of the Aja sessions, Becker and Fagen agreed to write and record "FM (No Static at All)", the theme song for the film FM. While the film failed critically and commercially, the single was a modest hit, reaching #22 on the Billboard chart. In order to avoid promoting their FM radio competitors, many Top 40 AM radio stations played a version of "FM" with the "A" sound from the chorus of "Aja", harmonically compatible, spliced over the "F" in "FM".

== See also ==
- 1977 in music
- Wayne Shorter discography
