= The Very Best of Steely Dan: Do It Again =

Greatest hits album by Steely Dan
- Released: 1987
- Recorded: 1972–1978
- Genre: Rock
- Label: Telstar
- Producer: Gary Katz

Steely Dan chronology
The Very Best of Steely Dan: Reelin' in the Years (1985/1987)	The Very Best of Steely Dan: Do It Again (1987)	Citizen Steely Dan (1993)

The Very Best of Steely Dan: Do It Again is a compilation album by Steely Dan, released in 1987.

== Track listing ==
All songs are written and composed by Walter Becker and Donald Fagen, except where noted.

No.	Title	Original album	Length
1.	"Rikki Don't Lose That Number"	Pretzel Logic (1974)	4:05
2.	"Reelin' in the Years"	Can't Buy a Thrill (1972)	4:24
3.	"Kid Charlemagne"	The Royal Scam (1976)	4:29
4.	"Doctor Wu"	Katy Lied (1975)	3:52
5.	"FM"	FM: The Original Movie Soundtrack (1978)	4:00
6.	"My Old School"	Countdown to Ecstasy (1973)	5:35
7.	"The Fez" (Becker, Fagen, Paul Griffin)	The Royal Scam	3:54
8.	"Do It Again"	Can't Buy a Thrill	5:52
9.	"Pretzel Logic"	Pretzel Logic	4:30
10.	"Any Major Dude Will Tell You"	Pretzel Logic	4:00
11.	"Black Friday"	Katy Lied	3:36
12.	"Show Biz Kids"	Countdown to Ecstasy	5:15
13.	"Peg"	Aja (1977)	3:53
14.	"Haitian Divorce"	The Royal Scam	5:44
