= Gold (Steely Dan album) =

Greatest hits album by Steely Dan
- Released: June 1982; 1991 (Expanded edition)
- Recorded: 1973–1982
- Genre: Rock, jazz fusion, rhythm and blues
- Length: 40:23 (original edition)
- Label: MCA Records
- Producer: Walter Becker, Donald Fagen

Steely Dan chronology
Gaucho (1980)	Gold (1982)	A Decade of Steely Dan (1985)

Gold, Expanded Edition

Professional ratings
Review scores
Source	Rating
Allmusic	4/5 stars
Christgau's Record Guide: The '80s	B+

Gold is a compilation album by Steely Dan, released in 1982. It mostly comprises hits both post-dating and not included on their 1978 Greatest Hits, essentially acting as "Volume 2"; it also features additional album tracks, offering a broad perspective on the band's career to that point.

== Overview ==
Seven of the tracks are from five of the band's albums from 1973 to 1980; it also includes the non-album single "FM (No Static at All)" (from the soundtrack to the 1978 film FM). Of the album tracks, there are two songs from both Aja and Gaucho, and one track apiece from Countdown to Ecstasy, Katy Lied and The Royal Scam.

== Release ==
A limited edition of the compilation was issued in 1982, which contained an additional four-track 12" disc with songs from 1978 Greatest Hits album.

In 1991, the compilation was reissued as the Expanded Edition with four extra tracks - "Here at the Western World" (previously only available on the band's 1978 Greatest Hits compilation), "Century's End" and "True Companion" (two Donald Fagen solo songs from movie soundtracks), and a live version of "Bodhisattva" (originally released as the B-side to the 1980 single "Hey Nineteen"). In addition, the reissue swapped the original "FM" with an alternate version with a saxophone solo replacing the guitar in the song's coda, a version that essentially incorporates the original single's B-side, "FM (Reprise)". Most Steely Dan compilations CDs since then feature this version of "FM", however, Gold (Expanded Edition) is the only place to find this version on vinyl.

== Box set ==
The box set of the same name, Gold, was also issued in 1982 and combined the band's seven albums and "FM (No Static at All)" single.

== Track listing ==
All songs by Walter Becker and Donald Fagen, except where noted.

Side one

No.	Title	Original album	Length
1.	"Hey Nineteen"	Gaucho, 1980	5:04
2.	"Green Earrings"	The Royal Scam, 1976	4:05
3.	"Deacon Blues"	Aja, 1977	7:26
4.	"Chain Lightning"	Katy Lied, 1975	2:57

Side two

No.	Title	Original album	Length
1.	"FM (No Static at All)"	FM: The Original Movie Soundtrack, 1978	4:50
2.	"Black Cow"	Aja, 1977	5:07
3.	"King of the World"	Countdown to Ecstasy, 1973	5:03
4.	"Babylon Sisters"	Gaucho, 1980	5:51

Bonus 12" on the 1982 limited edition
No.	Title	Original album	Length
1.	"Do It Again"	Can't Buy a Thrill, 1972	5:56
2.	"Reelin' in the Years"	Can't Buy a Thrill, 1972	4:35
3.	"Rikki Don't Lose That Number"	Pretzel Logic, 1974	4:34
4.	"Haitian Divorce"	The Royal Scam, 1976	5:50

Alternative track on the 1991 expanded edition
No.	Title	Original album	Length
5.	"FM"	Remix, original version from FM: The Original Movie Soundtrack, 1978	5:06

Bonus tracks on the 1991 expanded edition
No.	Title	Original album	Length
9.	"Here at the Western World"	Greatest Hits, 1978	4:02
10.	"Century's End" (Donald Fagen, Timothy Meher)	Bright Lights, Big City: Original Motion Picture Soundtrack, 1988	5:31
11.	"True Companion" (Donald Fagen)	Heavy Metal: Music from the Motion Picture, 1981	5:10
12.	"Bodhisattva (Live)"	B-side to "Hey Nineteen" single, 1980	7:42
Total length:			63:17

- Note: the vinyl and cassette version of the expanded edition have a slightly different track listing. Tracks 1–5 are on Side A, with "Bodhisattva (Live)" at the end of the side, and tracks 6–11 on Side B.
