= FM (No Static at All) =

1978 single by Steely Dan

Single by Steely Dan

from the album FM
- B-side: "FM (No Static at All) - Reprise"
- Released: May 19, 1978 (US)
- Recorded: 1977
- Studio: Capitol (Hollywood); Armand Steiner Soundlab (Los Angeles); Studio 55 (Los Angeles); Village (Los Angeles)
- Genre: Jazz rock
- Length: 4:52 (album version); 3:48 (German and Australian single edit); 3:40 (US, Canadian, French, and Spanish single edit); 3:28 (UK, Dutch, Belgian, and New Zealand single edit)
- Label: MCA
- Songwriters: Walter Becker; Donald Fagen
- Producer: Al Schmitt

Steely Dan singles chronology
"Deacon Blues" (1978)	"FM (No Static at All)" (1978)	"Josie" (1978)

"FM (No Static at All)" is a song by American jazz-rock band Steely Dan and the title theme for the 1978 film FM. It made the US Top 40 the year of its release as a single. A jazz-rock composition of bass, guitar and piano, its lyrics criticize the album-oriented rock format of many FM radio stations at that time, in contrast to the film's celebration of the medium.

"FM" was the first single Steely Dan released on MCA Records (which had released the soundtrack), predating by a year MCA's acquisition of ABC Records, the band's previous label. "FM" had been recorded during the same sessions as for the band's album Aja, using some of the same studio musicians and recording personnel, in addition to band members and songwriters Walter Becker and Donald Fagen. Among them were saxophonist Pete Christlieb and drummer Jeff Porcaro, and several members of the Eagles sang backing vocals. At the time of its release, Aja was enjoying critical and commercial success, leading some listeners to incorrectly assume that "FM" was also on that album. Since then, it has been included on some of the band's compilation albums.

It was the first time Becker and Fagen had written music for a film since 1971's You've Got to Walk It Like You Talk It or You'll Lose That Beat, a year before Steely Dan's debut album. "FM" also features a string section arranged and conducted by Johnny Mandel, only the second time the band had used strings in a song. Engineer Roger Nichols won that year's Grammy Award for Best Engineered Recording, Non-Classical for his work on "FM."

== Background and recording ==
Donald Fagen told American Songwriter in 2013 that he and Becker were in California finishing up Aja when they were called to develop a song for a film soundtrack. "There was a film called FM and we were asked to do the title song," Fagen recalled. They were told the only requirement was that the song had to be about FM radio.

The duo had not written music for a film since You've Got to Walk It Like You Talk It or You'll Lose That Beat in 1971, but approached the song with some preconceived ideas. "We wrote a song that would sound good with a big production, and an overdub of strings that would sound good coming out of movie-theater speakers," Fagen says in Reelin' in the Years, Brian Sweet's 2007 history of the band. It was the band's second use of strings in a song, the first being the short "Through with Buzz" on 1974's Pretzel Logic.

When the band entered the studio, they recorded "FM" over the course of a couple days. The two built the song from a click track, with Fagen playing piano, and Becker handling all the bass and guitar work, including the solo on the song's outro. "FM" was primarily recorded at Capitol Studios, with additional work being done at the Armand Steiner Soundlab, Studio 55 and The Village Recorder.

Becker and Fagen were accompanied by musicians who had played with the band on their Aja sessions. Jeff Porcaro, who had then recently helped form Toto, played the drums. Jazz musician Pete Christlieb, who also featured on the band's previous single, "Deacon Blues", supplied the tenor saxophone solo. Timothy B. Schmit, who had recently left Poco, was joined by his new bandmates in the Eagles, Glenn Frey and Don Henley, in singing backing vocals. "Johnny Mandel came in and did the string chart," Fagen recalled to American Songwriter. "It was fun to meet [him]." Roger Nichols, who had been the engineer for the Aja sessions, did the same for "FM", with help from Al Schmitt.

== Composition ==
Canadian studio musician Don Breithaupt included a chapter on the song in his book on Aja for Bloomsbury Publishing's 33⅓ series since it was recorded during the same sessions. "FM", he writes, combines lyrics that subvert the film the song served as a theme for, with sophisticated and complex music.

=== Lyrics ===
In his analysis of the song's lyrics, Breithaupt recounted how in the film, disc jockeys at a popular FM radio station take it over to prevent the station's management from capitulating to the demands of advertisers, reaffirming the values of the idiosyncratic, DJ-driven freeform and progressive FM rock stations that had emerged in the medium's early years during the late 1960s. But by 1978, he observed, "FM rock radio had evolved ... into one of music's chief promotional tools, and as such, was ripe for ridicule." Breithaupt notes the irony that the battle at the center of the film's plot had, "by 1978 ... already been fought and lost in every major market in North America" where the more commercially oriented album-oriented rock (AOR) had become the dominant FM format.

Breithaupt suggested that "it fell to Steely Dan to interject a little wit into the proceedings". The song's first verse celebrates partying barefoot with cheap "grapefruit wine", but the narrator (Fagen) is dismayed by the music selection playing on the accompanying FM radio—"nothing but blues and Elvis / And somebody else's favorite song," instead of the "hungry reggae" and "funked-up Muzak" he would like to hear. Other listeners, he realizes, are indifferent to the specifics of the radio playlist: "The girls don't seem to care ... as long as the mood is right ... as long as they play till dawn". The chorus's overlapping harmonies of "no static at all" suggest a station identification. But it seems "less like a technical boast than an admission that nothing on the airwaves was likely to surprise anyone," Breithaupt writes. "In its haste to wipe out background noise, FM had forgotten all about foreground noise."

=== Music ===
If ["FM"'s lyrics are] an argument for adventurousness, then [its music] is an instance of its own doctrine, with twists and turns aplenty.

— Breithaupt

Piano intro to "FM"
Fagen's repeated-thirds intro, with drum and guitar parts, ending in the tonic chord, followed by arpeggiated chords changing the song's key

The song begins with an overture, as Fagen repeats two pairs of thirds on a piano, a figure that, S. Victor Aaron writes, "prowls like a panther" while Becker adds bass flourishes and guitar licks, accented by cymbal crashes from Porcaro. "[It] goes to some lengths to establish the key of A major," Breithaupt notes. On the repeat of a plucked guitar phrase, the overture resolves with the guitar and piano joining for a tonic chord, after which the verse begins with three slightly arpeggiated piano chords—in the key of E minor.

The verse is built around what Breithaupt describes as a "swampy, hypnotic groove," in which Becker plays overdubbed bass and guitar parts in parallel fifths, suggesting the work of Henry Mancini, alternating with Fagen's piano chords, backed by a steady hi-hat and snare drum beat. This basic two-bar Dorian figure, sounding like some of Steely Dan's other uptempo songs, like "Josie" (a hit for the band around the same time, from Aja) slowed down to two-thirds speed, continues for the first seven bars of the verse.

First pre-chorus of "FM"
The first pre-chorus of "FM", with the song's fourth change of key at the end

"On the phrase 'girls don't seem to care,' the harmonic movement begins in earnest," Breithaupt observes, as the string section also enters and Becker adds some guitar fills. The descending melody is carried by similar chord changes, from Cmaj7 to F♯7 and B7, ending on an Emaj9. That last chord moves the key to E major as well for just a measure, when an A13 changes it to B major, which is again changed by an Am9-Em9 cadence back to E minor, but not without an A/C♯ suggesting the Dorian mode again. Breithaupt continues:

A standard minor blues turnaround brings us back to the top of the phrase, and we find ourselves, eight lines into the song, having heard four key changes, some cuíca and marimba by Victor Feldman, and a string section arranged and conducted by none other than Hollywood veteran Johnny Mandel. (If that sounds like a recipe for late seventies corporate rock, your Styx albums were different from mine)

Second pre-chorus and chorus
The second prechorus, which unlike the first one leads into the actual chorus, where Glenn Frey, Don Henley and Timothy B. Schmit sing backing vocals

The verse then repeats, with more Becker guitar fills, but when it reaches the Emaj9, it stays in that key. "The 'first ending' never recurs," says Breithaupt. Instead, the strings rise as the song goes into its brief chorus. Three overlapping backing vocals sing "no static at all" twice, and then after a quarter-note rest, Fagen joins them for the song's title and one more "no static at all." A guitar lick afterwards repeats its melody.

This leads into a resumption of the verse groove for four bars, then a descending line brings the song to Pete Christlieb's tenor sax solo. The groove changes slightly here, as Becker's bass and guitar part becomes a little less sparse, Fagen adds piano fills, and Porcaro opens up with the cymbals. Harmonically it is similar to the verse but with some new variations. "An Em9 and A13 suggest E Dorian is still in effect," Breithaupt writes, "but, in addition to functioning as I and IV in that mode, they become, by implication, II and V when the progression shifts into D major for a four-bar chromatic descent related to the intros of [Aja singles] 'Peg' and 'Deacon Blues'". In the longer version of Christlieb's solo on the instrumental B-side "FM (reprise)", Breithaupt continues, Christlieb's solo continues for another 50 bars, allowing him at one point to "state a fully formed F blues lick over the E minor vamp, selling it through sheer melodic logic and rhythmic momentum."

After the solo, the second verse and chorus repeat. Becker begins playing what Aaron describes as his "uncluttered, blues-kissed and memorable guitar solo" —"the track's most AOR-sounding element", according to Breithaupt—over the song's nearly two-minute outro. Underneath him, the verse groove continues, with Jeff Porcaro's drumming becoming more aggressive and Feldman adding more percussion fills. The song ends with a slow fade.

== Versions ==
The full-length version, which appears on the FM soundtrack album and the 12-inch single, has a running time of 4:50 and features Becker's guitar solo outro.

The song's 7-inch single features a radio edit of the song, shortening the solo and running 3:49. The single's B-side is "FM (reprise)", an instrumental reprise of "FM" with an extended version of Christlieb's sax solo in place of the guitar solo.

Steely Dan left the song off its first compilation, the two-disc Greatest Hits released at the end of 1978 (Fagen later joked that since MCA had sent them all the songs on the FM soundtrack, they might as well have put "More Than a Feeling" on it instead). "FM"'s first appearance on one of the group's albums is the original 1982 release of the compilation album Gold, which uses the 4:50 full-length version. The later compilation albums A Decade of Steely Dan and The Definitive Collection use this version as well.

A third version of "FM" was created by removing the guitar solo from the end of the original track, and using the "FM (reprise)" saxophone version as a new ending, yielding a running time of 5:06. This hybrid version appears on the 1991 compilation Gold (Expanded Edition), as well as the Citizen Steely Dan box set and the Showbiz Kids: The Steely Dan Story, 1972–1980 compilation (The box set styles the song as simply "FM", without the subtitle, and credits only Porcaro and Mandel as additional musicians).

An additional version, unauthorized by the band or its record label, was created by AM radio stations that played the single as part of their Top 40 format. AM music radio had steadily been losing listeners to FM stations, due to the latter's ability to broadcast in stereo and with minimal interference ("no static at all"). The year of "FM"'s release, 1978, was the first year that FM stations topped their AM counterparts in total listeners. Many of the latter did not want to promote their competition, but still had to play the song, so they spliced in the harmonically compatible "A" from the chorus of the song "Aja" (never released as a single) to make the chorus say "AM" instead.

== Reception ==
The song enjoyed divergent success throughout the world. In three countries it reached similar levels of success: No. 22 on the US Billboard Hot 100 the week of July 29, 1978, and No. 19 in Canada and New Zealand. At its most successful, it topped Spain's Los 40 Principales. On other hand, the single failed to make the Top 40 in two other large English-speaking markets. It was only able to reach No. 49 in the U.K., and performed worse in Australia, where it peaked at No. 87.

In its review of the single, Record World said that "The mood is more than a little eerie, with excellent guitar work and acerbic lyrics throughout."

Fagen felt the song could have been a bigger hit if the movie had been more successful. "The song was a hit, but I think we should have seen the movie before we committed ourselves," he said in 2007. "As you know, it wasn't a very successful movie." At the time he claimed neither he nor Becker had seen it, but seven years later, at a 2014 concert in Erie, Pennsylvania, called it "a rotten movie."

Fagen nevertheless remains satisfied with the song. "I feel like we didn't compromise on the song at all to make it program music," he said in Reelin' in the Years. "I enjoyed doing it, and I thought it was a very successful piece of movie music." "The ultimate irony," concludes Breithaupt, "was that FM radio, champion of the long-playing record, had as its anthem a one-off single."

It remains a favorite of the band's fans, regularly performed at concerts when Steely Dan resumed touring in the 1990s. Aaron calls it "a shining gem of a tune". Critic and John Lennon biographer Tim Riley recommends "FM" as one of ten Steely Dan songs with which to introduce "non-believers" to the band.

At the 21st Annual Grammy Awards in 1979 Roger Nichols won the Best Engineered Recording, Non-Classical award for "FM" and "FM (reprise)", complementing his receipt of the same award a year earlier for Aja. This is the only occasion on which this particular Grammy has been awarded for a single song.

In October 2015, the LED tower lights on the Empire State Building were choreographed to "FM (No Static at All)" in a show designed by Marc Brickman, to celebrate the 50th anniversary of its master FM antenna.

== Chart performance ==
In the United States, "FM (No Static at All)" entered the Billboard Hot 100 at No. 67 on June 3, 1978, the highest debut that week. It, along with three other songs that debuted alongside "FM (No Static at All)", including Pablo Cruise's "Love Will Find a Way", ascended into the top 40 for the first time less than a month later on July 1, 1978. After spending two consecutive weeks at No.23, it moved up one more spot to its peak of No. 22. "FM" then collapsed to No. 48 on August 5, its tenth and final week on the chart.

"FM"'s Canadian chart debut, at No. 90, followed its American entrance by two weeks. In mid-July it reached the Top 40 at No. 29; it remained at its peak, No. 19, for the first two weeks of August, after which it dropped to No. 27. By the end of the month, ten weeks after its debut, it left the charts. It ranked No. 152 on the Canadian year-end list.

The month after its North American chart debut, the single entered the New Zealand Chart at No. 37, reaching its peak at No. 19 where it remained for three consecutive weeks. At the beginning of October, it had fallen to No. 38 on its ninth and final week in the top 40.

== Personnel ==
- Donald Fagen – vocals, piano
- Walter Becker – electric guitar, bass guitar
- Jeff Porcaro – drums, percussion
- Victor Feldman – percussion
- Pete Christlieb – tenor saxophone
- Glenn Frey, Don Henley, Tim Schmit – backing vocals
- Johnny Mandel – string arrangements

== Chart history ==
=== Weekly charts ===
Chart (1978)	Peak position
Australia Kent Music Report	87
Canada RPM Top Singles	19
New Zealand (RIANZ)	19
Spain (Los 40 Principales)	1
UK (OCC)	49
US Billboard Hot 100	22
US Cash Box Top 100	24

=== Year-end charts ===
Chart (1978)	Rank
Canada	152

== Cover versions ==
- The Mountain Goats on their 1995 album Sweden.
- 3rd Bass sampled the song on "No Static At All" from their 1991 album Derelicts of Dialect.
- New Zealander musician Nathan Haines covered the song simply as "FM" for his third studio album, Squire For Hire (2003), featuring guest vocals by 2-D from Gorillaz (performed by Damon Albarn).
- Woody Herman on his 1978 album Plays Chick, Donald, Walter, and Woodrow.

== See also ==
- 1978 in music
- "The Nightfly", song from eponymous 1982 Fagen solo album sung from an all-night radio DJ's perspective
- "The Spirit of Radio", Rush single from the same era that similarly laments the commercialization of radio while seeming to celebrate the medium
- Steely Dan discography
