= Marian McPartland's Piano Jazz with Steely Dan =

Live album by Marian McPartland, Steely Dan
- Released: March 15, 2005
- Recorded: July 23, 2002
- Genre: Jazz
- Length: 77:34
- Label: Jazz Alliance
- Producer: Shari Hutchinson

Professional ratings
Review scores
Source	Rating
AllMusic	3.5/5 stars

Marian McPartland's Piano Jazz with Steely Dan is a jazz album released in 2005.

The album comprises music and conversation recorded during a 2002 visit by Steely Dan's Walter Becker and Donald Fagen to Marian McPartland's Piano Jazz radio program.

Together with McPartland on piano, Becker and Fagen play several jazz standards and three Steely Dan songs, backed by bass and drums.

The album is one in a series of recordings from the Piano Jazz show.

== Track listing ==
1. "Conversation" – 1:38
2. "Limbo Jazz" (Duke Ellington) – 2:42
3. "Conversation" – 5:07
4. "Josie" (Becker, Fagen) – 3:50
5. "Conversation" – 3:06
6. "Mood Indigo" (Barney Bigard, Duke Ellington, Irving Mills) – 3:07
7. "Conversation" – 2:41
8. "Star Eyes" (Gene de Paul, Don Raye) – 3:19
9. "Conversation" – 3:38
10. "Hesitation Blues" (W.C. Handy) – 3:26
11. "Conversation" – 5:17
12. "Things Ain't What They Used to Be" (Mercer Ellington, Ted Persons) – 3:46
13. "Conversation" – 1:41
14. "Chain Lightning" (Becker, Fagen) – 4:44
15. "Conversation" – 1:50
16. "Black Friday" (Becker, Fagen) – 3:50

== Personnel ==
- Marian McPartland – piano
- Walter Becker – electric guitar
- Donald Fagen – piano, vocals
- Jay Leonhart – double bass
- Keith Carlock – drums
