= American Hustle (soundtrack) =

American Hustle (Original Motion Picture Soundtrack)

Soundtrack album by Various artists
- Released: December 6, 2013
- Genres: Classical; jazz; rock
- Length: 54:41
- Labels: Madison Gate Records; Legacy Recordings
- Producer: Susan Jacobs

American Hustle (Original Motion Picture Soundtrack) is the soundtrack to the 2013 film American Hustle released by Madison Gate Records and Legacy Recordings on December 6, 2013. The album features a selection of popular music from the 1970s and 1980s performed by Duke Ellington, Donna Summer, Elton John, David Bowie, Frank Sinatra, Paul McCartney and Wings, Bee Gees, Jeff Lynne and his Electric Light Orchestra. The album featured mostly classical, rock and jazz selections. An expanded edition of the soundtrack, featuring five more tracks heard in the film was released in two-disc vinyl formats in November 2014. Receiving critical acclaim, the album was nominated for the Best Compilation Soundtrack for Visual Media at the 57th Annual Grammy Awards, and also a nomination for Best Soundtrack at the St. Louis Gateway Film Critics Association Awards 2013.

== Development ==
According to director David O. Russell, the film "was a propulsive kind of cinema that was driven by music". Duke Ellington's "Jeep Blues", which Russell called "very dear to him" and said is about reinvention, is used as a device to bring the two main characters together. Susan Jacobs, the film's music supervisor, felt that diversity of the music is the key to the film as "it conveys something about the characters" as the music ranges from various genres. Russell used music to represent the characters, such as Frank Sinatra's "Coffee Song" representing Carmine Palito, in order to express the characters' personalities and enable the audience to understand who the characters are on the inside in a way Russell felt would not otherwise be possible.

For the setting of the late 1970s and early 1980s, music emerged in the creative process that brought back Russell to that time period, though the songs he chose did not emerge from that time. In a mob sequence, Russell recalled that Renner had an idea to use Tom Jones' "Delilah" which was "just the perfect song to soundtrack those old-fashioned guys". In a sequence where Lawrence grooves in her living room while wearing cleaning gloves, Russell wanted to use the song "Live and Let Die" by Paul McCartney and Wings as "Because when you are dialed into actors you love and music you love, the ideas are visited upon you. When the idea to use the song came to me, people asked, 'Where is that even going to go?' And I said, 'It just feels right to me that her character is going to do this as her declaration of her independence from her husband.' When thoughts like that come to you, it's like they are delivered to you."

Russel said of using "Dirty Work" that "I love reclaiming things that aren't considered cool" and that when the song kicks in, it is "so specific and affecting". However, "Dirty Work" was not included on the soundtrack album; the song's writers, Walter Becker and Donald Fagen, were approached about putting it on the album but refused to give their permission.

== Promotions ==
In celebration of the Record Store Day's "Black Friday" event on November 28, 2014, Madison Gate Records and Legacy Recordings released the expanded edition of the soundtrack in 12-inch two-disc vinyl formats that featured five new tracks in the film, not included in the original release. Collider launched a giveaway contest for its subscribers to email them with their name and address of their contacts, and had liked their page on Facebook, open till December 1. Random winners have received the exclusive vinyl copies of the soundtrack.

Russell headlined the promotions of the album, as he was fan of vinyl discs and said that: "I gave the actors on American Hustle record players and the records that their characters would love. You can get a turntable for $100, and put one in every room. It's just a lovely thing to play vinyl. And there's an experience of opening a vinyl record and holding the art and looking at the sleeve that's unmistakable. I'm really proud of not just the music but the whole package." He further supervised the packaging of vinyl editions, providing hand-written excerpts from the script and a unique imagery from the film.

== Track listing ==
Original release
No.	Title	Performer(s)	Length
1.	"Jeep's Blues"	Duke Ellington	4:42
2.	"Goodbye Yellow Brick Road" (Album version)	Elton John	3:14
3.	"White Rabbit" (Arabic version)	Mayssa Karaa	2:32
4.	"10538 Overture" (40th anniversary rerecording)	Electric Light Orchestra	4:39
5.	"Live and Let Die"	Paul McCartney and Wings	3:11
6.	"How Can You Mend a Broken Heart"	The Bee Gees	3:56
7.	"I Feel Love"	Donna Summer	5:55
8.	"Don't Leave Me This Way"	Harold Melvin & the Blue Notes	6:07
9.	"Delilah"	Tom Jones	3:21
10.	"I've Got Your Number"	Jack Jones	1:50
11.	"Long Black Road"	Electric Light Orchestra	3:19
12.	"A Horse with No Name" (Album version)	America	4:11
13.	"Stream of Stars"	Jeff Lynne	2:43
14.	"Live to Live"	Chris Stills	3:06
15.	"Irving Montage"	Danny Elfman	1:55
Total length:			54:41

Expanded edition
No.	Title	Performer(s)	Length
16.	"Dirty Work"	Steely Dan	3:08
17.	"Papa Was a Rollin' Stone"	The Temptations	6:54
18.	"The Jean Genie"	David Bowie	4:06
19.	"The Coffee Song (They've Got An Awful Lot Of Coffee In Brazil)"	Frank Sinatra	2:39
20.	"It's De-Lovely"	Ella Fitzgerald	2:55
Total length:			74:23

== Charts ==
Weekly chart performance for American Hustle
Chart (2014)	Peak position
Austrian Albums (Ö3 Austria)	69
Belgian Albums (Ultratop Flanders)	108
Belgian Albums (Ultratop Wallonia)	179
Spanish Albums (Promusicae)	11
UK Compilation Albums (Official Charts)	39
UK Soundtrack Albums (Official Charts)	6
US Billboard 200	65
US Soundtrack Albums (Billboard)	4

Year-end chart performance for American Hustle
Chart (2014)	Position
US Soundtrack Albums (Billboard)	18
