= Hideki Fujii =

Japanese photographer (1934–2010)

Hideki Fujii (藤井 秀樹, Fujii Hideki; 1934 – May 3, 2010) was a Japanese fashion and illustration photographer.

Among his published works are the book Karada Kesho, with make-up artist Teruko Kobayashi. He was also responsible for the cover photography for the Steely Dan album Aja. Later in life he was director of the Nippon Photography Institute.

Fujii died on May 3, 2010, at the age of 75.
