= Greatest Hits (Steely Dan album) =

Greatest hits album by Steely Dan
- Released: November 30, 1978
- Recorded: 1972–1977
- Genre: Rock
- Length: 79:17
- Label: ABC
- Producer: Gary Katz

Steely Dan chronology
Greatest Hits (1978)	Steely Dan (1978)

Professional ratings
Review scores
Source	Rating
AllMusic	3/5 stars
Christgau's Record Guide	B−
Encyclopedia of Popular Music	3/5 stars
The Great Rock Discography	9/10

Greatest Hits is a compilation album by the American rock band Steely Dan, released in 1978 by ABC Records. The double album includes tracks from the band's first six studio albums, as well as a previously unreleased song, "Here at the Western World", recorded during sessions for The Royal Scam (1976). Greatest Hits was certified platinum in the U.S., with sales of over one million units.

== Track listing ==
All songs by Walter Becker and Donald Fagen, except where noted.

Side one
No.	Title	Original album	Length
1.	"Do It Again"	Can't Buy a Thrill (1972)	5:50
2.	"Reelin' In the Years"	Can't Buy a Thrill	4:35
3.	"My Old School"	Countdown to Ecstasy (1973)	5:45
4.	"Bodhisattva"	Countdown to Ecstasy	5:18

Side two
No.	Title	Original album	Length
1.	"Show Biz Kids"	Countdown to Ecstasy	5:21
2.	"East St. Louis Toodle-oo" (Duke Ellington, Bubber Miley)	Pretzel Logic (1974)	2:46
3.	"Rikki Don't Lose That Number"	Pretzel Logic	4:34
4.	"Pretzel Logic"	Pretzel Logic	4:30
5.	"Any Major Dude"	Pretzel Logic	3:06

Side three
No.	Title	Original album	Length
1.	"Here at the Western World"	Previously unreleased	4:00
2.	"Black Friday"	Katy Lied (1975)	3:39
3.	"Bad Sneakers"	Katy Lied	3:16
4.	"Doctor Wu"	Katy Lied	3:53
5.	"Haitian Divorce"	The Royal Scam (1976)	5:48

Side four
No.	Title	Original album	Length
1.	"Kid Charlemagne"	The Royal Scam	4:38
2.	"The Fez" (Becker, Fagen, Paul Griffin)	The Royal Scam	3:54
3.	"Peg"	Aja (1977)	3:54
4.	"Josie"	Aja	4:30

== Charts ==
Chart performance for Greatest Hits
Chart (1978)	Peak position
Australian Albums (Kent Music Report)	11
Canada Top Albums/CDs (RPM)	25
New Zealand Albums (RMNZ)	10
Norwegian Albums (VG-lista)	21
UK Albums (Official Charts)	41
US Billboard 200	30

== Certifications ==
Certifications for Greatest Hits
Region	Certification	Certified units/sales
Australia (ARIA)	Platinum	50,000^{^}
Canada (Music Canada)	Gold	50,000^{^}
New Zealand (RMNZ)	Platinum	15,000^{^}
United States (RIAA)	Platinum	500,000^{^}
^{^} Shipments figures based on certification alone.
