= Bill Schnee =

American musician, music producer, audio engineer

- Born: William S. Schnee; July 4, 1947 (age 78); Phoenix, Arizona, U.S.
- Occupations: Recording engineer; producer

William S. Schnee (born July 4, 1947) is an American musician, music producer, and audio engineer. Schnee has been nominated 11 times for the Best Engineered Album, Non-Classical Grammy Award and worked on a multitude of other Grammy nominated and awarded albums. He has won two Grammys, an Emmy for Outstanding Sound for a Television Special, and a Dove Award. In a 45+ year career of very diverse artists, Schnee has received over 135 gold and platinum records and has recorded/mixed over 50 top twenty singles.

== Early life ==
Schnee was born in Phoenix, Arizona, where he lived until he was 13. At that time, his family moved to California. Early musical training was in trumpet, saxophone and piano. In 1964, his senior year at Glendora High School, Schnee started a band, The LA Teens, writing songs and playing organ. Immediately after graduation, The LA Teens were signed to Decca Records. When their single releases had little success, the band was dropped, however, they were immediately signed by Mike Curb to work with producer/engineer Richie Podolor. While learning his craft, Schnee attended California State Polytechnic University, majoring in Business. Schnee then started law school at Loyola University, but took a leave of absence in the second semester to continue playing and recording music. Three years after being produced by Podolor, Schnee's big break came when he was hired to engineer in Podolor's studio. On Schnee's third day, Podolor put him in to record two tracks and some overdubs for Three Dog Night. Schnee never returned to law school.

== Career ==
Schnee was instrumental in launching Sheffield Lab Records and the modern era direct to disc audiophile recordings, when in 1973 he engineered Lincoln Mayorga & Distinguished Colleagues - The Missing Linc, Volume III, and in 1975 he produced and engineered the Thelma Houston and Pressure Cooker album, I've Got the Music in Me. These audiophile albums were recorded in real time directly to the phonograph record cutting lathe. Schnee went on to produce several more of the direct to disc albums, including James Newton Howard and Friends, The Drum Record, and The Track Record.

Schnee has recorded and mixed with a wide variety of artists that include Steely Dan, Chicago, Ringo (with all the Beatles), Natalie Cole, Rod Stewart, Dire Straits, Whitney Houston, Carly Simon, The Pointer Sisters, Gladys Knight & the Pips, Barry Manilow, Michael Bolton, The Jacksons, Mark Knopfler, Barbra Streisand, Neil Diamond, Marvin Gaye, George Benson, Bette Midler, and Amy Grant. As a producer, Schnee has worked with Boz Scaggs, Joe Sample, Thelma Houston, Kiki Dee, and launched the careers of Huey Lewis and the News and Pablo Cruise. Schnee has also mixed the bulk of the Japanese mega-star Kazumasa Oda's albums.

== Recording studio ==
In 1981, Schnee opened Schnee Studio in North Hollywood. Schnee and his fellow engineers built all of the equipment for the studio, including the discrete recording console and custom tube microphone preamps. The studio has an extensive collection of vintage tube microphones.

In 2015, Schnee Studio was sold and merged to become Studio 6 of the adjacent Larrabee Sound Studios.

== Awards ==
Schnee has been nominated eleven times in the category of Best Engineered Album, Non-Classical, winning twice.

=== Grammy Awards ===
- 1977 Aja – Best Engineered Album, Non-Classical
- 1981 Gaucho – Best Engineered Album, Non-Classical

=== Emmy Award ===
- 1992 Outstanding Achievement in Sound Mixing For a Variety, Music series, or Special for "Unforgettable, With Love" by Natalie Cole.

=== Dove Award ===
- 1995 Praise and Worship Album of the Year for Promise Keepers, Raise the Standard.

== Selected works ==
Over the course of his career, Schnee has worked on over 600 albums *Grammy Nominated for Best Engineered Album – Non Classical

- 1971 Barbra Joan Streisand – Barbra Streisand – engineer, mixing
- 1972 No Secrets – Carly Simon – engineer, mixing*
- 1972 Live Concert at the Forum – Barbra Streisand – engineer
- 1972 LaCroix – Jerry Lacroix – producer
- 1972 David Clayton-Thomas – David Clayton-Thomas – mixing
- 1973 Ringo – Ringo Starr – engineer, mixing
- 1973 Barbra Streisand...and Other Musical Instruments – Barbra Streisand – mixing
- 1974 Live! – Marvin Gaye – engineer, mixing
- 1974 Lincoln Mayorga & Distinguished Colleagues, Vol. 3 – Lincoln Mayorga – engineer, mixing*
- 1974 Hotcakes – Carly Simon – engineer, Remixing
- 1974 Goodnight Vienna – Ringo Starr – Audio engineer, engineer, Remixing
- 1975 Playing Possum – Carly Simon – engineer, Remixing
- 1975 Melissa – Melissa Manchester – engineer, Remixing
- 1975 I've Got the Music in Me – Thelma Houston – producer, engineer, mixing*
- 1975 Breakaway – Art Garfunkel – mixing
- 1976 I've Got a Reason – Richie Furay – producer
- 1976 Follow My Mind – Jimmy Cliff – mixing
- 1976 Don't Stop Believin' – Olivia Newton-John – mixing
- 1976 Endless Flight – Leo Sayer – engineer
- 1976 Farewell Fairbanks – Randy Edleman – producer
- 1977 Making a Good Thing Better – Olivia Newton-John – engineer, mixing
- 1977 I'm Glad You're Here with Me Tonight – Neil Diamond – engineer, mixing
- 1977 Discovered Again – Dave Grusin – engineer, mixing*
- 1977 Aja – Steely Dan – engineer*
- 1977 A Place in the Sun – Pablo Cruise – engineer, mixing
- 1977 If Love is Real – Randy Edleman – producer
- 1978 You Don't Bring Me Flowers – Neil Diamond – mixing engineer, supervisor
- 1978 Worlds Away – Pablo Cruise- producer
- 1978 Leo Sayer – Leo Sayer – engineer
- 1979 September Morn – Neil Diamond – engineer, mixing
- 1979 Part of the Game – Pablo Cruise – producer
- 1979 Stoneheart- Brick – producer
- 1979 Dr. Heckle and Mr. Jive – England Dan and John Ford Coley – mixing
- 1980 Middle Man – Boz Scaggs – producer
- 1980 Huey Lewis and the News – Huey Lewis & the News – producer
- 1980 Gideon – Kenny Rogers – mixing
- 1980 Gaucho – Steely Dan – engineer*
- 1980 Alibi – America – mixing
- 1980 New Baby – Don Randi and Quest – engineer, mixing*
- 1981 Growing Up in Hollywood Town – Lincoln Mayorga and Amanda McBroom – engineer, mixing*
- 1981 The Jacksons: Live – The Jacksons – engineer, mixing
- 1982 Dreamgirls [Original Broadway Cast Album] – mixing
- 1982 Chicago 16 – Chicago – mixing
- 1982 Stand by the Power – the Imperials – producer, engineer
- 1982 Missin' Twenty Grand – David Lasley – producer, engineer, mixing
- 1982 Angel Heart – Jimmy Webb – mixing
- 1982 So Excited! – Pointer Sisters – mixing
- 1983 Uncle Wonderful – Janis Ian – mixing
- 1983 Merciless – Stephanie Mills – mixing
- 1984 In London – Al Jarreau – engineer
- 1984 Love Language – Teddy Pendergrass – mixing
- 1984 Home Again – Judy Collins – mixing
- 1985 Whitney Houston – Whitney Houston – mixing
- 1985 Greg Rolie – Greg Rolie – producer
- 1985 Take No Prisoners – Peabo Bryson – mixing
- 1985 James Newton Howard and Friends – James Newton Howard – producer
- 1985 Gettin' Away with Murder – Patti Austin – mixing
- 1986 Tutu – Miles Davis – mixing, surround sound
- 1986 Double Vision – Bob James – engineer, mixing
- 1987 Get Close to My Love – Jennifer Holliday – engineer, mixing
- 1988 Other Roads – Boz Scaggs – producer
- 1988 Love Songs – David Sanborn – engineer, mixing
- 1988 Heart of Mine – Boz Scaggs – producer
- 1988 Get Here – Brenda Russell – mixing
- 1989 Spellbound – Joe Sample – mixing
- 1989 No Holdin' Back – Randy Travis – mixing
- 1989 Last Exit to Brooklyn – Mark Knopfler – mixing
- 1989 Amandla – Miles Davis – mixing
- 1990 Neck and Neck – Chet Atkins – mixing
- 1990 Grand Piano Canyon – Bob James – mixing
- 1990 Blue Pacific – Michael Franks – mixing
- 1990 Ashes to Ashes – Joe Sample – mixing
- 1991 On Every Street – Dire Straits – engineer
- 1991 Healing the Wounds – The Crusaders – mixing
- 1991 Hard at Play – Huey Lewis & the News – producer
- 1992 Timeless: The Classics – Michael Bolton – engineer
- 1992 Home for Christmas – Amy Grant – mixing
- 1993 The Sun Don't Lie – Marcus Miller – mixing
- 1993 Starbox – Boz Scaggs – producer
- 1993 Screenplaying – Mark Knopfler – mixing
- 1993 Love Songs – Diane Schuur – mixing
- 1993 Love Remembers – George Benson – engineer, mixing
- 1993 Friends Can Be Lovers – Dionne Warwick – mixing
- 1993 Citizen Steely Dan – Steely Dan – engineer
- 1994 Tenderness – Al Jarreau – mixing
- 1994 Cohen Live – Leonard Cohen – mixing
- 1994 Love is Always 17 – David Gates – mixing
- 1995 The Tattooed Heart – Aaron Neville – mixing
- 1996 The Sheffield Pop Experience – producer
- 1996 Sheffield Jazz Experience – producer
- 1996 That's Right – George Benson – engineer, mixing
- 1996 In My Lifetime – Neil Diamond – engineer, mixing
- 1996 Full Circle – Randy Travis – mixing
- 1996 Mandy Barnett – Mandy Barnett – producer
- 1997 Vulnerable – Marvin Gaye – mixing
- 1997 Greatest Hits – Kenny G – engineer
- 1997 Artist of My Soul – Sandi Patty – mixing
- 1998 The Movie Album: As Time Goes By – Neil Diamond – engineer, mixing
- 1998 As Time Goes By – Neil Diamond – engineer, mixing
- 1999 Snowbound – Fourplay – engineer
- 1999 The Song Lives On – Lalah Hathaway – producer
- 1999 Body Language – Boney James – mixing
- 2000 Tutu/Amandla/Doo-Bop – Miles Davis – mixing
- 2000 Tomorrow Today – Al Jarreau – engineer, mixing
- 2000 Here's to You Charlie Brown – David Benoit, engineer, mixing*
- 2000 Fingerprints – Larry Carlton – mixing
- 2000 Absolute Benson – George Benson – mixing*
- 2001 The Disney Album – Michael Crawford – mixing
- 2001 On the Way to Love – Patti Austin – mixing
- 2001 Christmas Memories – Barbra Streisand – mixing
- 2002 The Christmas Album – Johnny Mathis – mixing
- 2002 The Pecan Tree – Joe Sample – producer
- 2002 David Clayton-Thomas/Tequila Sunrise – David Clayton-Thomas – engineer, mixing
- 2003 The Movie Album – Barbra Streisand – mixing
- 2003 This Guy's in Love – Steve Tyrell – mixing
- 2003 Bette Midler Sings the Rosemary Clooney Songbook – Bette Midler – engineer, mixing
- 2004 Stardust: The Great American Songbook, Vol. 3 – Rod Stewart – engineer, String Engineer
- 2004 Sheffield Lab Drum and Track Disc – Sheffield Track Record – producer, engineer
- 2004 Just for a Thrill – Ronnie Milsap – mixing
- 2005 Twilight of the Renegades – Jimmy Webb – mixing
- 2005 Thanks for the Memory: The Great American Songbook, Vol. 4 – Rod Stewart – Audio engineer, engineer
- 2005 Altered State – Yellowjackets – engineer
- 2005 Bette Midler Sings the Peggy Lee Songbook – Bette Midler – mixing
- 2006 Romantic Classics – Julio Iglesias – engineer
- 2007 Home at Last – Billy Ray Cyrus – mixing
- 2007 Free – Marcus Miller – mixing
- 2007 At the Movies – Dave Koz – engineer
- 2008 Encanto – Sergio Mendes – mixing
- 2008 Benji Hughes – Benji Hughes – mixing
- 2008 Still Unforgettable – Natalie Cole – engineer*
- 2008 Marcus – Marcus Miller – mixing
- 2009 Soulbook – Rod Stewart – mixing
- 2009 Anything Goes – Herb Alpert – engineer, mixing
- 2009 Priority/Black and White – Pointer Sisters – mixing
- 2010 The Essential Herb Alpert – Herb Alpert – mixing
- 2011 1 – Julio Iglesias – engineer
- 2012 I'll Take Romance – Steve Tyrell – engineer, mixing
- 2012 As Time Goes By/Stardust [The Great American Songbook, Vols. 2-3] – Rod Stewart – engineer
- 2012 AM/FM – Rita Wilson – engineer
- 2013 New Blood/No Sweat/More Than Ever – Blood, Sweat & Tears – producer
- 2013 My Hope: Songs Inspired by the Message and Mission of Billy Graham – engineer, mixing
- 2013 It's Magic: The Songs of Sammy Cahn – Steve Tyrell – mixing
- 2014 Night Songs – Barry Manilow – mixing
- 2014 My Dream Duets – Barry Manilow – engineer, mixing
- 2015 That Lovin' Feeling – Steve Tyrell – engineer, mixing

=== Scores for movies and television ===
- 1985 Promised Land [Original Score] – James Newton Howard – engineer
- 1987 The Princess Bride [Original Soundtrack] – Mark Knopfler – mixing
- 1989 Beaches [Original Soundtrack] – Bette Midler – engineer
- 1991 The Prince of Tides [Original Soundtrack] – James Newton Howard – mixing
- 1992 The Bodyguard [Original Motion Picture Soundtrack] – engineer
- 1994 The Swan Princess [Original Soundtrack] – mixing
- 1995 Father of the Bride, Pt. 2 [Original Soundtrack] – Alan Silvestri – mixing
- 1996 E.R.: Original Television Theme Music and Score – producer
- 1997 The Postman [Original Score/Soundtrack] – James Newton Howard – producer
- 1997 Space Jam [Original Score] – James Newton Howard – engineer, mixing
- 2000 Space Cowboys [Original Soundtrack] – engineer, mixing
- 2001 Atlantis: The Lost Empire [Original Soundtrack] – James Newton Howard – engineer
- 2011 Rio [Music from the Motion Picture] – engineer, mixing
