= Dirty Work (Steely Dan song) =

Song by Steely Dan

from the album Can't Buy a Thrill
- Released: November 1972
- Recorded: August 1972
- Studio: The Village Recorder, Los Angeles
- Genre: Pop
- Length: 3:08
- Label: ABC
- Songwriters: Donald Fagen; Walter Becker
- Producer: Gary Katz

Official audio
- "Dirty Work" on YouTube

"Dirty Work" is a song written by Donald Fagen and Walter Becker of Steely Dan, which appeared on the band's 1972 debut album Can't Buy a Thrill.

== Theme ==
The song's lyrics describe an affair between a man and a married woman, sung by the man. Steely Dan FAQ author Anthony Robustelli describes "Dirty Work" as a "song of self-loathing", while The Guardian describes the narrative as soap operatic. The singer recognizes that the woman is using him, but is too infatuated to end the affair. The second verse lyric "Like a castle in its corner in a medieval game" references the rook, a piece in chess, which was a hobby of Becker's.

== Style and arrangement ==
The song's music has been described as more commercial-sounding than most of the band's other material. The Guardian says that it sounds like "a radio-friendly stroll of a song," at least at first. AllMusic critic Stewart Mason attributes this, in part, to the "upward-modulating" refrain and "soulful" clavinet (Note: actually not a clavinet, but a Wurlitzer electronic piano) as well as the tenor saxophone part played by guest musician Jerome Richardson. Steely Dan biographer Brian Sweet describes Richardson's sax solo as being "perfectly understated."

"Dirty Work" is one of the songs on Can't Buy a Thrill on which David Palmer provided the lead vocal. Brian Sweet hypothesizes that Fagen did not want to sing the song himself because he and Becker did not even want to include it on the album, but the executives at ABC Records wanted some more conventional tunes on the album and therefore insisted that "Dirty Work" be included. The ABC executives had also thought the song would be ideal for Three Dog Night or the Grass Roots to record. After Palmer left the group, touring vocalist Royce Jones would sing the song live in concert. It was revived in 2006, however, with the band's female backing vocalists singing it from the perspective of a woman having an affair with a married (or attached) man.

== Release and reception ==
The song was included on the band's 1972 debut album Can't Buy a Thrill. The same year it was released as a single on the Probe label in the Netherlands.

AllMusic critic Stephen Thomas Erlewine describes "Dirty Work" as a "terrific pop song that subvert[s] traditional conventions" and is one of the best songs on Can't Buy a Thrill, while MusicHound author Gary Graff refers to it as being "instantly memorable." Rolling Stone critic James Isaacs attributes the song's success to the fact that it "juxtaposes David Palmer's sweet tenor voice with misogynistic lyrics." Robustelli similarly agrees that part of the song's effect is the contrast between Palmer's smooth voice and the harsh lyrics. "Dirty Work" was included on several Steely Dan compilation albums, including The Best of Steely Dan: Then and Now in 1993, Showbiz Kids: The Steely Dan Story, 1972–1980 in 2000 and Steely Dan: The Definitive Collection in 2006.

== Later use ==
The song was used in the first episode of season 3 of The Sopranos, "Mr. Ruggerio's Neighborhood," as Tony Soprano sings it while driving his SUV unaware that the FBI is watching him. The song was also used in the 2013 film American Hustle, but Fagen and Becker did not give permission for it to be included on the soundtrack album. In the eighth episode of season 28 of The Simpsons, "Dad Behavior," Homer Simpson sings a parody of the song’s chorus. The song was later used in the fourteenth episode of season 33, "You Won't Believe What This Episode Is About – Act Three Will Shock You!". It's also featured in the 2018 documentary Robin Williams: Come Inside My Mind. It also appeared in the trailers and television advertisements for the 2021 film The Suicide Squad. The song was used in the first episode of the second season of hit HBO drama Euphoria. It also appeared in Paul Thomas Anderson's 2025 film One Battle After Another.

== Personnel ==
- David Palmer – lead vocal
- Donald Fagen – piano, Wurlitzer electronic piano, Hammond B3 organ, backing vocals
- Denny Dias – acoustic guitar
- Jeff Baxter – electric guitar
- Walter Becker – bass guitar, backing vocals
- Jim Hodder – drums, backing vocals
- Jerome Richardson – tenor saxophone
- Snooky Young – flugelhorn

== Certifications ==
Region	Certification	Certified units/sales
New Zealand (RMNZ)	Platinum	30,000^{‡}
^{‡} Sales+streaming figures based on certification alone.

== Other recordings ==
Iain Matthews recorded the song for his 1974 album, Some Days You Eat the Bear And Some Days the Bear Eats You. The Vancouver-based studio group Songbird (Mike Flicker, Howard Leese and Rob Deans) had a Mushroom Records single release of "Dirty Work" which was a minor hit in Canada, peaking at #47 on the national hit parade on the charts of November 30 and December 7,1974. The song is the first track of the 1974 album I'm Not Making Music for Money, the thirteenth and final studio album by Kenny Rogers and the First Edition, which was only issued in New Zealand. Melissa Manchester recorded "Dirty Work" on her 1977 LP Help Is on the Way. The Pointer Sisters recorded a version for their 1978 album Energy. "Dirty Work" was recorded by Max Merritt and released as a single on the Polydor label in Australia and New Zealand in 1979. An acoustic version was also recorded by indie-folk musical duo Elle Cordova (formerly Reina del Cid) and Toni Lindgren in 2025.
