= Mark Masters (musician) =

- Birth name: Mark Alton Masters
- Born: November 13, 1957 (age 67); Gary, Indiana, U.S.
- Genres: Jazz
- Occupation(s): Musician, composer, arranger, bandleader
- Instrument: Trumpet
- Years active: 1982–present
- Labels: Capri

Mark Alton Masters (born November 13, 1957) is an American jazz trumpeter, composer, and arranger. According to biographer Michael G. Nastos, Masters "has emerged as one of the great jazz arrangers of the 20th and 21st century..."

Masters studied at Riverside City College and California State University, Los Angeles. He made his first recordings as a leader in 1984.

Masters is president of the board of directors of the American Jazz Institute, "a non-profit organization dedicated to the enrichment and enhancement of the appreciation of jazz music" in Pasadena, California.

== Discography ==
=== As leader ===
- Early Start, (Sea Breeze, 1984)
- Silver Threads Among the Blues, (Sea Breeze, 1986)
- Priestess, (Capri, 1990)
- Jimmy Knepper Songbook, (Focus Distribution, 1993)
- The Clifford Brown Project, (Capri, 2003)
- Porgy and Bess: Redefined, (Capri, 2005)
- Wish Me Well, (Capri, 2006)
- Farewell Walter Dewey Redman, (Capri, 2008)
- Ellington Saxophone Encounters, (Capri, 2012)
- Everything You Did: The Music of Walter Becker and Donald Fagen, (Capri, 2013)
