= Josie (Steely Dan song) =

1978 single by Steely Dan

- Italian cover

Single by Steely Dan

from the album Aja
- B-side: "Black Cow"
- Released: August 14, 1978
- Recorded: 1977
- Genre: Jazz rock; pop rock; yacht rock
- Length: 4:30
- Label: ABC
- Songwriter(s): Walter Becker; Donald Fagen
- Producer(s): Gary Katz

Steely Dan singles chronology
"FM (No Static at All)" (1978)	"Josie" (1978)	"Hey Nineteen" (1980)

Official audio
- "Josie" on YouTube

"Josie" is a song written by Walter Becker and Donald Fagen and first released by Steely Dan on their 1977 album Aja. It was also released as the third single from the album and performed modestly well, reaching number 26 on the Billboard Hot 100 and number 44 on the Easy Listening chart that year. It has appeared on several Steely Dan live and compilation albums.

== Composition and music ==
Becker and Fagen wrote an early version of "Josie" well before the recordings for Aja took place. While most of the songs on the album fuse jazz with rock, AllMusic critic Stewart Mason describes "Josie" as the album's "most conventional rocker." Nonetheless "Josie" incorporates many jazz chords. Don Breithaupt sees an influence from the Delta blues, particularly in the "stark open fifths and lyric-driven rhythm," but he also notes that it incorporates "exotic open chords derived from the parallel Phrygian scale." Rolling Stone critic Michael Duffy describes it as having "tight, modal tunes with good hooks in the choruses, solid beats with intricate counter rhythms and brilliantly concise guitar solos" as well as a complex horn chart and "schmaltzy" L.A. jazz riffs. Mason praises the song's "sly irony and danceable R&B groove." J.J. Syrja notes that the song even echoes disco, but doesn't "fall victim" to it.

Becker plays a guitar solo on the song, one of the few on Aja. Steely Dan biographer Brian Sweet particularly praised his solo, calling it "a real stormer." Fagen sings the lead vocals. The other musicians on the song include Chuck Rainey on bass guitar, Victor Feldman on electric piano and Larry Carlton and Dean Parks on guitar. The drummer is Jim Keltner, whom critic Victor Aaron particularly praises for a fill that restarts the song near the end after a brief pause.

== Lyrics and reception ==
Billboard described "Josie" as a "rhythmic rocker" and praised its "outstanding vocals," "funky, steady beat" and "wry lyrics." Cash Box said it has a "clean crystalline rhythm and lead lines," "understated yet invigorating rhythm guitar funk," and a "clever 'up' lyric," among other virtues. Record World said that "The opening guitar figure is an eerie hook in itself, while the balance of the song blends pop and jazz in fine fashion." Seguin Gazette-Enterprise reviewer J. J. Syrja describes the song as "a tasty ditty about a community girl in the truest sense of the word." "The lyrics describe the boys of the neighborhood celebrating the return of a fun-loving girl named Josie who may have a shady past and anticipating the debauchery that may ensue. Sweet suggests that she may be returning from prison.

== Personnel ==
- Donald Fagen – synthesizers, vocals
- Walter Becker – guitar solo
- Victor Feldman – electric piano
- Larry Carlton – guitar
- Dean Parks – guitar
- Chuck Rainey – bass
- Jim Keltner – drums, percussion
- Timothy B. Schmit – backing vocals

== Release charting ==
Josie was released as the third single from Aja, following "Peg" and "Deacon Blues." A non-Aja single, "FM (No Static at All)," was released between "Deacon Blues" and "Josie." Although the earlier two Aja singles reached the Top 20, "Josie" fell a little short of that, peaking at number 26 on the Billboard Hot 100. It also reached number 44 on the Billboard Adult Contemporary chart. In Canada it reached number 20.

"Josie" was included on several Steely Dan compilation albums, including Greatest Hits in 1978, Citizen Steely Dan in 1993 and Showbiz Kids: The Steely Dan Story, 1972–1980 in 2000. Several live versions were released, including on Alive in America in 1995, Plush TV Jazz-Rock Party in 2000 and Green Flower Street: Radio Broadcast 1993 in 2015.
