= Dick LaPalm =

American music publicist and promoter

Dick LaPalm (June 23, 1927, or 1928 – October 7, 2013), born Ricardo LaPalombara, was an American music publicist and promoter. Working primarily with jazz artists, LaPalm was known as "The Jazz Lobbyist" for his promotion of artists he felt deserved to be stars. His most famous client was Nat King Cole. Some of his other clients included Count Basie, Woody Herman, Peggy Lee, Sonny Rollins, Mel Torme, and Sarah Vaughan.
