= Bad Sneakers =

Single by Steely Dan

from the album Katy Lied
- B-side: "Chain Lightning"
- Released: September 1975
- Recorded: November 1974
- Studio: ABC, Los Angeles, California
- Genre: Soft rock
- Length: 3:16
- Label: ABC
- Songwriters: Walter Becker, Donald Fagen
- Producer: Gary Katz

Steely Dan singles chronology
"Black Friday" (1975)	"Bad Sneakers" (1975)	"Kid Charlemagne" (1976)

Official audio
- "Bad Sneakers" on YouTube

"Bad Sneakers" is a song by jazz rock band Steely Dan. It was released as the second single from and second track on their 1975 album Katy Lied, but only reached number 103 in the charts. The album's producer, Gary Katz, later regretted not suggesting that the song be released as a single. The band Sneaker, best known for their Top 40 hit "More Than Just the Two of Us", took their name from "Bad Sneakers".

Cash Box noted that "a razored guitar bridge highlights and counterbalances some laidback vocals with the overall sound layered and dimensional." Record World said that it "pieces together bits of the L.A. r&r experience while stranded outside of Radio City Music Hall." Steely Dan biographer Anthony Robustelli likened it to their later song "Aja" in that it features sections which are disparate in both feel and genre (with elements of reggae, funk, and jazz) yet fit together seamlessly.

The backing vocals on "Bad Sneakers" are by Michael McDonald, who made his recording debut with Katy Lied. Robustelli said that for most people, the entrance of McDonald's vocals on the second pre-chorus (at the lyric "going insane") is the most memorable part of the song. McDonald had previously been a member of Steely Dan's 1974 touring band, and would continue to perform backing vocals for the band in recordings until 1980. The song also appears on the compilation albums A Decade of Steely Dan and Citizen Steely Dan.

== Lyrics ==
As usual for their works, songwriters Walter Becker and Donald Fagen have been silent about the meaning of "Bad Sneakers". However, biographer Brian Sweet has assessed that the song seems to be about Becker and Fagen's longing for New York and their difficulty relating to the people and general climate of their new home of California. Another Steely Dan biographer, Anthony Robustelli, says it is likely that the lyric "Five names that I can hardly stand to hear, including yours and mine" refers to the five original members of Steely Dan (which includes Becker and Fagen).

== Personnel ==
Credits per Robustelli.

Steely Dan

- Donald Fagen – lead vocal
- Walter Becker – guitar solo

Additional musicians

- Michael Omartian – piano
- Hugh McCracken – guitar
- Denny Dias – electric sitar
- Chuck Rainey – bass guitar
- Jeff Porcaro – drums
- Victor Feldman – vibraphone
- Michael McDonald – backing vocals

== Covers ==
The alternative band The Push Stars covered the song for the Me, Myself & Irene (2000) soundtrack. It is one of eight Steely Dan covers which appear on that soundtrack.
