= FM (soundtrack) =

FM: The Original Movie Soundtrack

Soundtrack album by Various artists
- Released: April 12, 1978
- Genre: Rock
- Label: MCA
- Producer: Various artists

Singles from FM
- 1. "FM (No Static at All)" Released: May 19, 1978 (US)

Professional ratings
Review scores
Source	Rating
Allmusic	4/5 stars
Christgau's Record Guide	B−

FM: The Original Movie Soundtrack is the original soundtrack to the 1978 film FM.

== Reception ==
In the United States, the album reached the Top Five of Billboard's album chart and quickly earned a Platinum-certified disc. It reached 37 in the UK charts.

Roger Nichols won the 1979 Grammy Award for Best Engineered Album, Non-Classical for his work on the soundtrack.

Album cover Art Director and Designer John Kosh.

== Track listing ==
=== LP ===
Side One

1. "FM (No Static at All)" - Steely Dan – 4:52
2. "Night Moves" - Bob Seger – 3:27
3. "Fly Like an Eagle" - Steve Miller Band – 3:04
4. "Cold as Ice" - Foreigner – 3:20
5. "Breakdown" - Tom Petty & The Heartbreakers – 2:44
6. "Bad Man" - Randy Meisner – 2:38

Side Two (Order of songs on inside jacket show side three songs before side two songs)

1. "Life in the Fast Lane" - Eagles – 4:46
2. "Do It Again" - Steely Dan – 5:54
3. "Lido Shuffle" - Boz Scaggs – 3:42
4. "More Than a Feeling" - Boston – 4:45

Side Three

1. "Tumbling Dice" - Linda Ronstadt – 4:51 (Live Version)
2. "Poor, Poor Pitiful Me" - Linda Ronstadt – 4:15 (Live Version)
3. "Livingston Saturday Night" - Jimmy Buffett – 3:10
4. "There's a Place in the World for a Gambler" - Dan Fogelberg – 5:41
5. "Just the Way You Are" - Billy Joel – 4:49

Side Four

1. "It Keeps You Runnin'" - The Doobie Brothers – 4:13
2. "Your Smiling Face" - James Taylor – 2:43
3. "Life's Been Good" - Joe Walsh – 8:05
4. "We Will Rock You" - Queen – 2:04
5. "FM - Reprise" - Steely Dan – 2:54

=== Cassette ===
Side A

1. "FM (No Static at All)" - Steely Dan – 4:52
2. "Night Moves" - Bob Seger – 3:27
3. "Fly Like an Eagle" - Steve Miller Band – 3:04
4. "Cold as Ice" - Foreigner – 3:20
5. "Livingston Saturday Night" - Jimmy Buffett – 3:10
6. "Bad Man" - Randy Meisner – 2:38
7. "Life in the Fast Lane" - Eagles – 4:46
8. "Breakdown" - Tom Petty & The Heartbreakers – 2:44
9. "Just the Way You Are" - Billy Joel – 4:49
10. "Lido Shuffle" - Boz Scaggs – 3:42
11. "More Than a Feeling" - Boston – 4:45

Side B

1. "Tumbling Dice" - Linda Ronstadt – 4:51 (Live Version)
2. "Poor, Poor Pitiful Me" - Linda Ronstadt – 4:15 (Live Version)
3. "Do It Again" - Steely Dan – 5:54
4. "There's a Place in the World for a Gambler" - Dan Fogelberg – 5:41
5. "It Keeps You Runnin'" - The Doobie Brothers – 4:13
6. "Your Smiling Face" - James Taylor – 2:43
7. "Life's Been Good" - Joe Walsh – 8:05
8. "We Will Rock You" - Queen – 2:04
9. "FM - Reprise" - Steely Dan – 2:54

== Charts ==
=== Weekly charts ===
Chart (1978–79)	Peak position
Australian Albums (Kent Music Report)	12
Canada Top Albums/CDs (RPM)	4
German Albums (Offizielle Top 100)	46
New Zealand Albums (RMNZ)	1
UK Albums (Official Charts)	37
US Billboard 200	5

=== Year-end charts ===
Chart (1978)	Position
Canada Top Albums/CDs (RPM)	44
New Zealand Albums (RMNZ)	13

== Sales and certifications ==
Region	Certification	Certified units/sales
United States (RIAA)	Platinum	1,000,000^{^}
^{^} Shipments figures based on certification alone.
