= Aja (album) =

Studio album by Steely Dan
- Released: September 23, 1977
- Recorded: 1976–1977
- Studios: Village Recorders (Los Angeles); Producer's Workshop (Hollywood); Warner Bros. (North Hollywood); ABC Recording Studios (Los Angeles); Sound Labs (Hollywood); A&R Studios (New York City)
- Genres: Jazz rock; jazz fusion; jazz pop; progressive jazz; smooth jazz; experimental; blue-eyed soul; yacht rock
- Length: 39:54
- Label: ABC
- Producer: Gary Katz

Steely Dan chronology
The Royal Scam (1976)	Aja (1977)	Gaucho (1980)

Singles from Aja
- 1. "Peg" Released: November 1977; 2. "Deacon Blues" Released: March 1978; 3. "Josie" Released: August 1978

Aja (pronounced /ˈeɪʒə/, like Asia) is the sixth studio album by the American rock band Steely Dan, released on September 23, 1977, by ABC Records. For the album, band leaders Walter Becker and Donald Fagen pushed Steely Dan further into experimenting with different combinations of session players, enlisting the services of nearly 40 musicians, while pursuing longer, more sophisticated compositions and arrangements. Like all the band's previous albums, it was produced by Gary Katz.

The album peaked at number three on the Billboard Top LPs & Tape chart, and number five on the UK Albums Chart, ultimately becoming Steely Dan's most commercially successful release. It spawned the hit singles "Peg", "Deacon Blues", and "Josie". At the 20th Annual Grammy Awards in 1978, Aja won Best Engineered Recording – Non-Classical, and was nominated for Album of the Year and Best Pop Performance by a Duo or Group with Vocals. It has appeared on many retrospective "greatest albums" lists, with critics and audiophiles applauding the album's high production quality. In 2010, the album was added to the National Recording Registry by Library of Congress for being "culturally, historically, or aesthetically significant".

== Background and recording ==
Aja was produced by Steely Dan's longtime producer Gary Katz, engineered by longtime master engineers Roger Nichols and Bill Schnee and features contributions from numerous leading session musicians.

Co-composer and co-band leader Walter Becker did not perform on the tracks "Black Cow" or "Peg". Victor Feldman's Fender Rhodes piano solo on "Black Cow" was recorded at the same time as the basic instruments on the track, a break from Steely Dan's usual recording practice.

The eight-minute-long title track is composed of a number of different sections which were written independently of each other and then strung together. The middle section, for instance, was adapted from an instrumental called "Stand by the Seawall" which dates back to before Steely Dan's formation, and was among the songs Becker and Fagen played when auditioning for the band Demian. "Aja" features a jazz-based chord progression and solos by saxophonist Wayne Shorter, drummer Steve Gadd, guitarist Denny Dias, and Becker. When Katz asked Shorter if he was interested in playing on a Steely Dan session, the answer was a resounding "no", but after Steely Dan had Shorter's colleague Dick LaPalm vouch for them, he agreed to do it.

After hearing the band on The Tonight Show Starring Johnny Carson, Becker and Fagen were very impressed by one of their saxophonists and wanted him to play on "Deacon Blues". However, they did not know which saxophonist it was, so Katz brought in one after another until they figured out that the one they wanted was Pete Christlieb.

When recording "Home at Last", Becker and Fagen told the drummer, Bernard Purdie, that they did not want a typical Motown or Chicago style of shuffle. Purdie suggested "the Purdie Shuffle". Becker and Fagen had never heard of this shuffle, so Purdie explained that it had a half-time feel that was funky and laid back but different from other shuffles, and they agreed to use it on the track.

"I Got the News" had been written during the sessions for The Royal Scam, but was dramatically rewritten by the time of Aja.

"Peg" was the final song recorded for Aja, and the only one recorded in New York instead of Los Angeles. Elliot Scheiner, whom Steely Dan had cut ties with in an acrimonious manner during the recording of their previous album, The Royal Scam, was forgiven and brought back in to engineer "Peg".

The sessions for Aja produced several outtakes, including "You Got the Bear", "Stand by the Seawall", and "Were You Blind that Day". The lyrics to "Were You Blind that Day" were later rewritten, and it became "Third World Man" from Steely Dan's next album, Gaucho. "Stand by the Seawall" is a standalone rendition of the instrumental which was ultimately repurposed as one of the movements in "Aja". "You Got the Bear" was never officially released in any form, but was played live on Steely Dan's 2011 Shuffle Diplomacy Tour.

== Music and lyrics ==
Aja has variously been described as a jazz rock, jazz fusion, jazz pop, progressive jazz, smooth jazz, experimental, blue-eyed soul and yacht rock album. According to Becker and Fagen, the electric funk song "Black Cow" was titled after one of the popular names for a root beer float. In a 1989 interview, Fagen hinted that the lyrics were about the breakup of one of his relationships: "A lot of time when a relationship ends or there's some sort of a crisis in a relationship one particular incident will stand out in your mind as you remember it; in this case, we thought that particular scene of this woman downing a black cow in a small luncheonette - the place where the shit hit the fan, so to speak - is what stood out in the narrator's mind. It was probably in Brooklyn, I would imagine."

Steely Dan biographer Anthony Robustelli described "Peg" as "an altered blues that doesn't sound like a blues. The juxtaposition of a major seventh chord with added nine and a minor seventh chord with a sharp five creates a joyous, yet ambiguous, sound."

== Title and packaging ==
The title of the album is pronounced the same as "Asia". Fagen has said Aja was the name of a Korean woman who married the brother of one of his high-school friends. The album cover features a photograph by Hideki Fujii of Japanese model and actress Sayoko Yamaguchi, and was designed by Patricia Mitsui and Geoff Westen. The inside photos of Fagen and Becker were taken by Becker and Dorothy A. White.

== Marketing and sales ==
Aja was released by ABC Records on September 23, 1977. In anticipation of the release, Katz urged the relatively private Fagen and Becker to raise their public profile, and arranged a meeting with Irving Azoff to discuss employing him as their manager. Fagen initially had reservations, saying: "We were ready to go blissfully through life without a manager."

With Azoff's connections with record stores and the album offered at a discounted price, Aja became, according to Cameron Crowe in the December 1977 issue of Rolling Stone, "one of the season's hottest albums and by far Steely Dan's fastest-selling ever." It reached the top five of the Billboard Top LPs & Tape chart within three weeks of its release, and peaked at number three, becoming the band's highest-charting album in the United States. The album was also the group's highest-charting album in the UK, reaching number five on the UK Albums Chart. According to Billboard, Aja was Steely Dan's biggest hit and one of the first albums to be given the then-new Platinum certification by the Recording Industry Association of America (RIAA) for one million US sales.

Attempts to make a surround-sound mix of the album for a release in the late 1990s were scrapped when it was discovered that the multitrack masters for both "Black Cow" and the title track were missing. Universal Music canceled plans to release a multichannel SACD version of the album for the same reason. In the liner notes for the 1999 remastered reissue of the album, Fagen and Becker offered a $600 reward for the missing masters or any information that would lead to their recovery.

== Reception and legacy ==
Retrospective professional reviews
Review scores
Source	Rating
AllMusic	4.5/5 stars
Chicago Tribune	2.5/4 stars
Christgau's Record Guide	B+
Encyclopedia of Popular Music	5/5 stars
MusicHound Rock	4.5/5
Pitchfork	10/10
Q	5/5 stars
Rolling Stone	5/5 stars
The Rolling Stone Album Guide	3.5/5 stars
Tom Hull – on the Web	A−

Reviewing the album in 1977 for Rolling Stone, Michael Duffy wrote, "the conceptual framework of [Steely Dan's] music has shifted from the pretext of rock & roll toward a smoother, awesomely clean and calculated mutation of various rock, pop and jazz idioms", while their lyrics "remain as pleasantly obtuse and cynical as ever". He added that the duo's "extreme intellectual self-consciousness", though it might be starting to show its limitations with this album, "may be precisely the quality that makes Walter Becker and Donald Fagen the perfect musical antiheroes for the Seventies." Robert Christgau of The Village Voice wrote that he "hated this record for quite a while before I realized that, unlike The Royal Scam, it was stretching me some", and noted that he was "grateful to find Fagen and Becker's collegiate cynicism in decline", but worried that a preference for longer, more sophisticated songs "could turn into their fatal flaw". Greg Kot was also lukewarm about the band's stylistic departure, later writing in the Chicago Tribune: "The clinical coldness first evidenced on The Royal Scam is perfected here. Longer, more languid songs replace the acerbic pithiness of old." Barry Walters was more receptive in a retrospective review for Rolling Stone, saying: "rock has always excelled at embodying adolescent ache. But it's rare when rock captures the complications of adult sorrows almost purely with its sound."

Jazz historian Ted Gioia has cited Aja as an example of Steely Dan "proving that pop-rock could equally benefit from a healthy dose of jazz" during its original tenure, which coincided with a period when rock musicians were frequently experimenting with jazz idioms and techniques. Amanda Petrusich wrote in Pitchfork that the album is "as much a jazz record as a pop one", while Ben Ratliff of The New York Times said it "created a new standard for the relationship between jazz and rock, one that was basically irreproducible, by Steely Dan or anyone else [...] a progressive jazz record with backbeats, a '70s hipster's extension of what had been Gil Evans's vision two decades earlier." In Dylan Jones' list of the best jazz albums for GQ, Aja ranked 62nd.

The album has been cited by music journalists as one of the best test recordings for audiophiles, due to its high production standards. Walters wrote in his review that "the album's surreal sonic perfection, its melodic and harmonic complexity—music so technically demanding its creators had to call in A-list session players to realize the sounds they heard in their heads but could not play, even on the instruments they had mastered." Reviewing Aja's 2007 all-analog LP reissue, Ken Kessler of the Hi-Fi News & Record Review gave top marks to both the recording and performance qualities, and called the album "sublime jazz-rock that hasn't aged at all—unless you consider 'intelligence' passe—it is everything you expected the painfully hip/cool Becker and Fagen to deliver."

=== Accolades ===
Aja has appeared on retrospective "greatest albums" lists. In 2000, Aja was voted number 118 in the third edition of Colin Larkin's book All Time Top 1000 Albums, in which Larkin noted its "brand of jazz-influenced white soul". In 2003, Aja was inducted into the Grammy Hall of Fame and ranked 145th on Rolling Stone's list of the "500 Greatest Albums of All Time"; it maintained the same spot on the 2012 update of the list, and rose to 63rd on the 2020 version. In 2006, Aja was included in the book 1001 Albums You Must Hear Before You Die. In 2010, it was recognized by the Library of Congress as "culturally, historically, or aesthetically significant" and selected for preservation in the National Recording Registry; the same year, De La Soul's 1989 debut album 3 Feet High and Rising, which sampled Aja, was also added to the Registry.

The singer Bilal listed Aja among his 25 favorite albums, explaining that "It's a great body of work. It seems very thought out from beginning to end, every song just had a certain vibe. The songwriting to the sound and the look of the album, the whole package was just very well thought out."

=== Classic Albums episode ===
In 1999, Aja was the topic of an episode of the British documentary series Classic Albums. The episode features a song-by-song study of the album (except for "I Got the News", which is played during the closing credits), as well as interviews with, among others, Becker and Fagen, and new, live-in-studio versions of songs from the album, with a band made up of Bernard Purdie, Chuck Rainey, Paul Griffin, who all played on Aja, and their new guitar player Jon Herington. Becker and Fagen also play back several of the rejected guitar solos for "Peg", which were recorded before Jay Graydon produced the take used for the album.

Of the sound of the album, Andy Gill wrote: "Jazz-rock was a fundamental part of the 70s musical landscape [...] [Steely Dan] wasn't rock or pop music with ideas above its station, and it wasn't jazzers slumming [...] it was a very well-forged alloy of the two – you couldn't separate the pop music from the jazz in their music." British musician Ian Dury says he hears elements of legendary jazz musicians like Charlie Parker, Charles Mingus, and Art Blakey on the album. He continues: "Well, Aja's got a sound that lifts your heart up, and it's the most consistent up-full, heart-warming [...] even though, it is a classic LA kinda sound. You wouldn't think it was recorded anywhere else in the world. It's got California through its blood, even though they are boys from New York [...] They've got a skill that can make images that aren't puerile and don't make you think you've heard it before [...] very 'Hollywood filmic' in a way, the imagery is very imaginable, in a visual sense."

=== Yacht rock ===
"Home at Last"
30-second sample

In retrospective appraisals, Aja has been discussed by music journalists as an important release in the development of yacht rock. In a 2009 Spin article, Chuck Eddy listed it among the genre's eight essential albums. Writing for uDiscoverMusic in 2019, Paul Sexton said that, with the album, Steely Dan "announced their ever-greater exploration of jazz influences", which would lead to "their yacht-rock masterpiece": 1980's Gaucho. Patrick Hosken of MTV News said that both Aja and Gaucho show how "great yacht rock is also more musically ambitious than it might seem, tying blue-eyed soul and jazz to funk and R&B". Aja was included in Vinyl Me, Please magazine's list of "The 10 Best Yacht Rock Albums to Own on Vinyl", with an accompanying essay that said: "Steely Dan's importance to yacht rock can't be overstated. [...] Arguably the Dan is smoothest on the 1980 smash Gaucho, but Aja finds Walter Becker and Donald Fagen comfortably hitting a middle-ground stride [...] as a mainstream hit factory while remaining expansive and adventurous". John Lawler of Something Else! wrote, "The song and performance that best exemplifies the half-time, funky, laid (way) back in the beat shuffle within the jazz-pop environment of the mid- to late- 70s can be found on 'Home at Last.' Bernard 'Pretty' Purdie feeds off Chuck Rainey's bass with righteous grooves and masterful off-beat fills with alacrity in this tight band favorite."

When HBO director Garret Price asked Fagen by telephone to ask to interview him for Yacht Rock: A Dockumentary, Fagen responded "Oh, yacht rock. Well, I tell you what. Why don't you go f--- [sic] yourself?" and hung-up on Price. However, Fagen's manager immediately called him back and granted permission to use six Steely Dan songs in the documentary.

== Track listing ==
All tracks are written by Walter Becker and Donald Fagen.

Side A
No.	Title	Length
1.	"Black Cow"	5:10
2.	"Aja"	7:57
3.	"Deacon Blues"	7:35

Side B
No.	Title	Length
4.	"Peg"	3:57
5.	"Home at Last"	5:35
6.	"I Got the News"	5:07
7.	"Josie"	4:33
Total length:		39:54

== Personnel ==
Adapted from the liner notes.

Side A

1. "Black Cow"
  - Donald Fagen – lead vocals, synthesizer
  - Paul Humphrey – drums
  - Chuck Rainey – bass guitar
  - Victor Feldman – Rhodes piano
  - Joe Sample – clavinet
  - Larry Carlton – guitar
  - Tom Scott – tenor saxophone
  - Clydie King, Venetta Fields, Sherlie Matthews, Rebecca Louis – backing vocals
2. "Aja"
  - Donald Fagen – lead vocals, synthesizer, police whistle, backing vocals
  - Steve Gadd – drums
  - Chuck Rainey – bass guitar
  - Larry Carlton, Walter Becker, Denny Dias – guitars
  - Joe Sample – Rhodes piano
  - Michael Omartian – piano
  - Victor Feldman – percussion, marimba
  - Wayne Shorter – tenor saxophone
  - Timothy B. Schmit – backing vocals
3. "Deacon Blues"
  - Donald Fagen – lead vocals, synthesizer
  - Bernard Purdie – drums
  - Walter Becker – bass guitar
  - Larry Carlton, Lee Ritenour – guitars
  - Victor Feldman – Rhodes piano
  - Pete Christlieb – tenor saxophone
  - Clydie King, Sherlie Matthews, Venetta Fields – backing vocals
  - Dean Parks – acoustic guitar

Side B

1. "Peg"
  - Donald Fagen – lead vocals
  - Rick Marotta – drums
  - Chuck Rainey – bass guitar
  - Paul Griffin – Rhodes piano, backing vocals
  - Don Grolnick – clavinet
  - Steve Khan – guitar
  - Jay Graydon – guitar solo
  - Victor Feldman, Gary Coleman – percussion
  - Tom Scott – Lyricon
  - Michael McDonald – backing vocals
2. "Home at Last"
  - Donald Fagen – lead vocals, synthesizer (solo), backing vocals
  - Bernard Purdie – drums
  - Chuck Rainey – bass guitar
  - Larry Carlton – guitar
  - Walter Becker – guitar solo
  - Victor Feldman – piano, vibraphone
  - Timothy B. Schmit – backing vocals
3. "I Got the News"
  - Donald Fagen – lead vocals, synthesizers
  - Ed Greene – drums
  - Chuck Rainey – bass guitar
  - Victor Feldman – piano, vibraphone, percussion
  - Dean Parks – guitar
  - Walter Becker, Larry Carlton – guitar solos
  - Michael McDonald, Clydie King, Venetta Fields, Sherlie Matthews, Rebecca Louis – backing vocals
4. "Josie"
  - Donald Fagen – lead vocals, synthesizers, backing vocals
  - Jim Keltner – drums, percussion
  - Chuck Rainey – bass guitar
  - Victor Feldman – Rhodes piano
  - Larry Carlton, Dean Parks – guitars
  - Walter Becker – guitar solo
  - Timothy B. Schmit – backing vocals

All tracks

- Tom Scott – horn arrangements and conducting of horns
- Jim Horn, Bill Perkins, Wayne Shorter, Pete Christlieb, Plas Johnson, Tom Scott, Jackie Kelso – saxophones, flutes
- Chuck Findley, Lou McCreary, Dick "Slyde" Hyde – brass
- Walter Becker, Donald Fagen, Larry Carlton, Dean Parks, Michael Omartian – rhythm arrangements

Production

- Stephen Diener – executive producer
- Gary Katz – producer
- Roger Nichols – executive engineer, engineer
- Elliot Scheiner, Bill Schnee, Al Schmitt – engineers
- Lenise Bent, Ken Klinger, Linda Tyler, Ed Rack, Joe Bellamy, Ron Pangaliman – assistant engineers
- Bernie Grundman – mastering engineer
- Barbara Miller – production coordinator
- Stuart "Dinky" Dawson – sound consultant
- Irving Azoff – management
- Leonard Freedman – bagman
- Karen Stanley – covert operations
- Oz Studios – art direction
- Patricia Mitsui, Geoff Westen – design
- Hideki Fujii – cover photo
- Walter Becker, Dorothy A. White – inside photos of Donald Fagen and Walter Becker
- Michael Phalen (Walter Becker & Donald Fagen), Stephen Diener – liner notes

Reissue personnel

- Roger Nichols – remastering engineer
- Beth Stempel – coordinator
- Vartan – art direction
- Mike Diehl – design
- Daniel Levitin – consultant

== Awards ==
Grammy Awards

Year	Winner	Category
1978	Aja; Roger Nichols, Elliot Scheiner, Al Schmitt & Bill Schnee, engineers	Best Engineered Recording – Non-Classical

== Charts ==
=== Weekly charts ===
Chart (1977)	Peak position
Australian Albums (Kent Music Report)	9
Canada Top Albums/CDs (RPM)	3
Dutch Albums (Album Top 100)	9
New Zealand Albums (RMNZ)	3
Norwegian Albums (VG-lista)	10
Swedish Albums (Sverigetopplistan)	35
UK Albums (Official Charts)	5
US Billboard 200	3

=== Year-end charts ===
Chart (1977)	Position
Canada Top Albums/CDs (RPM)	33
Chart (1978)	Position
Canada Top Albums/CDs (RPM)	23
New Zealand Albums (RMNZ)	49
US Billboard 200	5

== Certifications ==
Region	Certification	Certified units/sales
Canada (Music Canada)	2× Platinum	200,000^{^}
United Kingdom (BPI)	Gold	100,000^{‡}
United States (RIAA)	2× Platinum	2,000,000^{^}
^{^} Shipments figures based on certification alone.^{‡} Sales+streaming figures based on certification alone.

== See also ==
- List of 1970s albums considered the best

== Bibliography ==
- Robustelli, Anthony (2017). Steely Dan FAQ: All that's Left to Know about this Elusive Band. Milwaukee, WI: Backbeat Books. ISBN 9781495025129.
- Sweet, Brian (2018). Steely Dan: Reelin' in the Years. Omnibus Press. ISBN 978-1787600638.
