= Deacon Blues =

1978 single by Steely Dan

- Artwork for German vinyl single

Single by Steely Dan

from the album Aja
- B-side: "Home at Last"
- Released: 24 March 1978
- Recorded: 1977
- Studio: Village Recorder, Los Angeles
- Genre: Jazz rock
- Length: 7:36 (album version); 6:33 (7" single version)
- Label: ABC
- Songwriters: Walter Becker; Donald Fagen
- Producer: Gary Katz

Steely Dan singles chronology
"Peg" (1977)	"Deacon Blues" (1978)	"FM (No Static at All)" (1978)

Audio
- "Deacon Blues" on YouTube

"Deacon Blues" is a song by the American rock band Steely Dan, written by Walter Becker and Donald Fagen in 1976 for the band's sixth album, Aja (1977). It peaked at number 19 on the US Billboard Hot 100 and number 17 on the US Cash Box Top 100 in June 1978. It also reached number 40 on the Easy Listening chart. In Canada, it peaked at number 14, a position it occupied for two weeks, and number 20 Adult Contemporary. In 2021, it was ranked No. 214 on Rolling Stone magazine's list of the "500 Greatest Songs of All Time".

The single's B-side, "Home at Last", another Becker and Fagen composition, was also taken from the album.

== Background ==
Donald Fagen said of the song's opening lines and theme:

The concept of the "expanding man" that opens the song may have been inspired by Alfred Bester's The Demolished Man. Walter and I were major sci-fi fans. The guy in the song imagines himself ascending to the levels of evolution, "expanding" his mind, his spiritual possibilities, and his options in life.

The song was largely written at Fagen's house in Malibu and was prompted by his observation that "if a college football team like the University of Alabama could have a grandiose name like the 'Crimson Tide' the nerds and losers should be entitled to a grandiose name as well." The song's protagonist, muses Fagen, is somewhat "autobiographical in that it reflected the dreams [Fagen and Becker had] about becoming jazz musicians while . . . living in the suburbs." Characterized as a "loser" by Becker, the song's subject was meant to reflect "a broken dream of a broken man living a broken life". In his 2013 memoir Eminent Hipsters, Fagen gives credit to Norman Mailer as inspiration for the narrator's persona:

[It] toyed with the cliché of the jazz musician as antihero. It was kind of a takeoff on that old essay by Norman Mailer, "The White Negro," not to mention our lives up to that point. . . . the alienated white suburban kid thinks that if he learns how to play bebop, he'll throw off the chains of repression and live the authentic life, unleash the wild seeds of art and passion and so on.

On the origin of the song's name, Fagen says, it was inspired by football player Deacon Jones, as they like the sound of his name: "It also had two syllables, which was convenient, like 'Crimson'." The song, however, is really about "the ultimate outsider, the flip side of the dream, boy-o . . . call me Deacon Blues." Deacon Jones was changed to Deacon Blues to avoid legal troubles.

== Recording ==
"Deacon Blues" was recorded at Village Recorders in West Los Angeles. Jazz guitarist Larry Carlton used Fagen's demos to transcribe the chords into a rhythm section that featured Carlton's guitar on the song's opening. Saxophonist Tom Scott wrote the horn arrangement. After hearing the band on Johnny Carson's Tonight Show, Becker and Fagen were very impressed by one of their saxophonists and wanted him to play on "Deacon Blues". However, they did not know who in the band it was, so their producer, Gary Katz, brought in one saxophonist after another until he came in with Pete Christlieb, who Becker and Fagen recognized as the one they wanted. According to Christlieb, he went to the studio after taping the show one evening and recorded his part in just two takes, one for the first solo and one for the second:

They told me to play what I felt. Hey, I'm a jazz musician, that's what I do ... so I recorded my first solo ... we listened back and they said it was great. I recorded a second take and that's the one they used. I was gone in a half hour. The next thing I know I'm hearing myself in every airport bathroom in the world.

"Deacon Blues" is the only song on Aja on which Becker plays bass.

About its composition, Fagen later stated: "One thing we did right on 'Deacon Blues' and all of our records: we never tried to accommodate the mass market. We worked for ourselves and still do."

== Release and reception ==
"Deacon Blues" was released on Steely Dan's 1977 album Aja, which reached No. 3 on the US Billboard album chart, a position it held for seven consecutive weeks. At seven-and-a-half minutes, "Deacon Blues" was too long to fit onto a single, so ABC Records asked Becker, Fagen, and Katz to create an edited version for a single release. They refused on the grounds that to abridge the recording in any way would destroy its fundamental value. ABC nonetheless released a six-and-a-half minute long single edit which cut out the first ten measures of the first saxophone solo and shortened the outro, and the song became Steely Dan's fifth Top 20 hit on the Billboard Hot 100 chart, where it peaked at number 19 the weeks of June 10 and 17, 1978. "Deacon Blues" remained in the Top 40 for eight weeks.

Billboard particularly praised the "outstanding" saxophone playing. Cash Box praised the production, "jazzy guitar licks," lead vocals and "tasty keyboard touches." Record World said, "from the masters of the complex lyric, musings on what it means to be an artist." Village Voice critic Robert Christgau wrote that "not only is "Deacon Blues" one of their strongest songs ever, it's also one of their warmest."

== Legacy ==
In a 1994 AOL chat interview, Becker discussed the inspiration for the song, "It was an outgrowth of a specific mood that pertained at a given time," and later added, "I remember the night that we mixed that one thinking that it was really good and wanting to hear it over and over which is never the case." Music critic Marc Myers wrote, "As midlife-crisis songs go, Steely Dan's 'Deacon Blues' ranks among the most melodic and existential."

The Scottish pop/rock band Deacon Blue took their name from this song. William Gibson's 1988 book Mona Lisa Overdrive features a gang called the Deacon Blues.

"Steely Blues" on Dan Deacon's 2015 album Gliss Riffer is named in reference to this song.

Singer-songwriters Bill Callahan and Will Oldham released a cover in 2020, which appeared on their 2021 album Blind Date Party.

== Personnel ==
- Walter Becker – bass
- Donald Fagen – synthesizer, vocals
- Larry Carlton, Lee Ritenour – guitar
- Dean Parks – acoustic guitar
- Pete Christlieb – tenor saxophone
- Victor Feldman – electric piano
- Bernard "Pretty" Purdie – drums
- Venetta Fields – backup vocals
- Clydie King – backup vocals
- Sherlie Matthews – backup vocals

== Charts ==
=== Weekly charts ===
Chart (1978)	Peak position
Canada Top Singles (RPM)	14
Canada Adult Contemporary (RPM)	20
US Billboard Hot 100	19
US Adult Contemporary (Billboard)	40
US Cash Box Top 100	17

=== Year-end charts ===
Chart (1978)	Rank
Canada Top Singles (RPM)	129
US Billboard Hot 100	100
US (Joel Whitburn's Pop Annual)	127
