= Peg (song) =

1977 single by Steely Dan

- Side A of the US single

Single by Steely Dan

from the album Aja
- B-side: "I Got the News"
- Released: November 1977
- Recorded: 1977
- Genre: Jazz rock; pop rock
- Length: 3:57
- Label: ABC
- Songwriters: Walter Becker; Donald Fagen
- Producer: Gary Katz

Steely Dan singles chronology
"Haitian Divorce" (1976)	"Peg" (1977)	"Deacon Blues" (1978)

Official Audio
- "Peg" on YouTube

"Peg" is a song by the American rock group Steely Dan, first released on the band's 1977 album Aja. The track was released as a single in 1977 and reached number 11 on the US Billboard chart in 1978 and number eight on the Cash Box chart. With a chart run of 19 weeks, "Peg" is tied with "Rikki Don't Lose That Number" and "Hey Nineteen" for being Steely Dan's longest-running chart hit. In Canada, "Peg" spent three weeks at number seven in March 1978.

== Music and lyrics ==
"Peg" has been described by AllMusic critic Stephen Thomas Erlewine as a "sunny pop" song with "layers of jazzy vocal harmonies", while music scholar Stephen K. Valdez said it features a fusion of jazz and rock elements. In the opinion of jazz musician and academic Andy LaVerne, the song "has the blues at its core, though it might not be apparent at first listen".

The song's guitar solo was attempted by seven top studio session guitarists—including Robben Ford and recurring guitarist Larry Carlton—before Jay Graydon's version became the "keeper". For the first hour of the session Graydon played what he called "my 'dig me' jazz-pop stuff", but then Fagen directed him to try more of a blues approach. Graydon felt he could not play in a blues style over the C major 7 chord used in the song, but turned to a blues approach whenever the chord changed to G2 over B. He worked on the song for about six hours before the band was satisfied. According to Graydon, at the end of the session they gave no indication of whether or not they liked the solo enough to use it, and he did not find out it was on the record until he heard the song played on the radio.

Michael McDonald provides multi-tracked backup vocals in the choruses, and keyboardist Paul Griffin can be heard talking and improvising background vocals in the final chorus and fadeout.

Although there was speculation that the name was a reference to Broadway star and one-time Hollywood actress Peg Entwistle, in 2000 the band said the song was written about a real person but not Entwistle. In 2020, Donald Fagen said "There's no hidden meaning. We just wanted a dotted half note for that spot, and 'Peg' was short enough to fit with the music." Fagen added that the song "takes place at a seedy photo shoot in L.A...from the perspective of [a] jilted boyfriend."

== Legacy ==
Billboard praised the "sarcastic" lyrics, the "stinging instrumental break" and the "chilling" piano playing. Cash Box wrote, "this snappy number has the beat and the harmonic hooks to capture that extra top 40 momentum." Record World called it "a pop-rock love song, crafted with [Steely Dan's] usual perfectionism and flair."

Pitchfork rated "Peg" as its 87th best song of the 1970s, describing it as the "perfect Steely Dan song, and one of the strangest hits to ever grace the mainstream." Drummer Rick Marotta called "Peg" one of the greatest tracks he has ever played on. In 2017, Dan Weiss of Billboard ranked the song third on his list of the top 15 Steely Dan songs, and in 2020, Phil Freeman of Stereogum ranked the song second on his list of the top 10 Steely Dan songs.

The song was the theme music for a celebrity paparazzi segment by the syndicated news magazine Entertainment Tonight from 1981 to 1985.

"Peg" was heavily sampled on the 1989 De La Soul song "Eye Know". It was covered by Nerina Pallot in 2007 and in 2014 by Donny Osmond.

== Chart performance ==
=== Weekly charts ===
Chart (1977–1978)	Peak position
US Billboard Hot 100	11
US Billboard Adult Contemporary	30
US Cash Box Top 100	8
Canadian RPM Top Singles	7

=== Year-end charts ===
Chart (1978)	Rank
US Billboard Hot 100	62
Canada	67

== Personnel ==
Source: Adapted from Aja liner notes.

- Donald Fagen – lead vocals
- Michael McDonald – backing vocals
- Jay Graydon – lead guitar
- Steve Khan – rhythm guitar
- Paul Griffin – Fender Rhodes electric piano, backing vocals
- Don Grolnick – clavinet
- Chuck Rainey – bass guitar
- Rick Marotta – drums
- Tom Scott – Lyricon
- Gary Coleman, Victor Feldman – percussion
