= Sneaker (disambiguation) =

A sneaker is a type of shoe originally designed for athletics.

Sneaker or sneakers may also refer to:

== Music ==
- Sneaker (band), an American rock band
  - Sneaker (album), album by Sneaker
- Sneakers (band), a Danish rock band
- "Sneakers" (song), a 2022 song by Itzy

== Literature ==
- Sneaker (comic), a character in the UK comic, The Dandy
- The Sneaker, a Japanese light novel magazine
- "Sneakers" (short story), a 1989 short story by Stephen King

== Film ==
- Sneakers (1992 film), an American film starring Robert Redford
- Sneakers (2011 film), a Bulgarian film

== Other ==
- Sneaker wave, type of ocean wave
- Sneakers (2002 video game), for the Xbox
- Sneakers (1981 video game), for the Apple II computer

== See also ==
- Sneak (disambiguation)
- Sneakernet, jargon for computer file transfer
