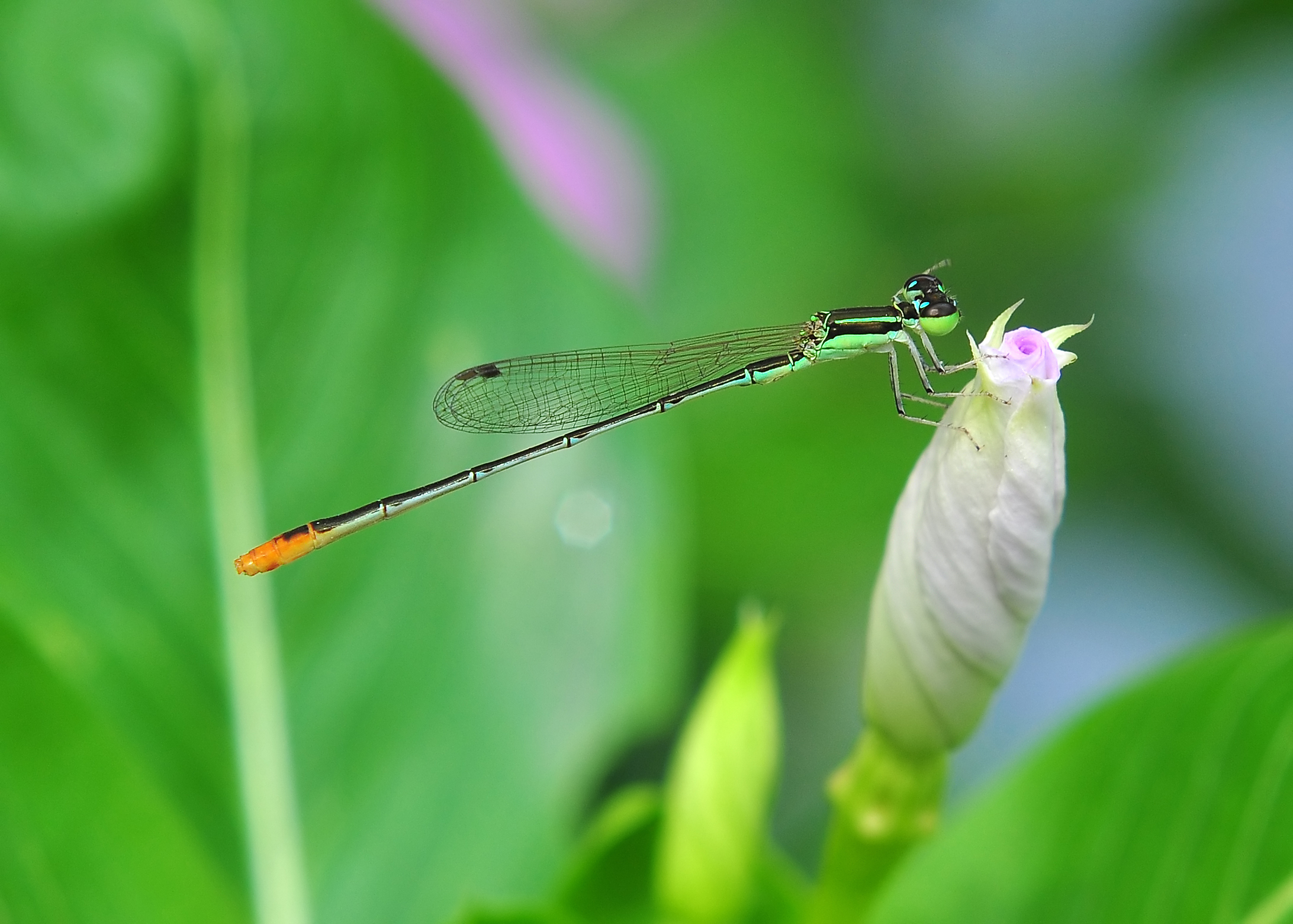
- Male
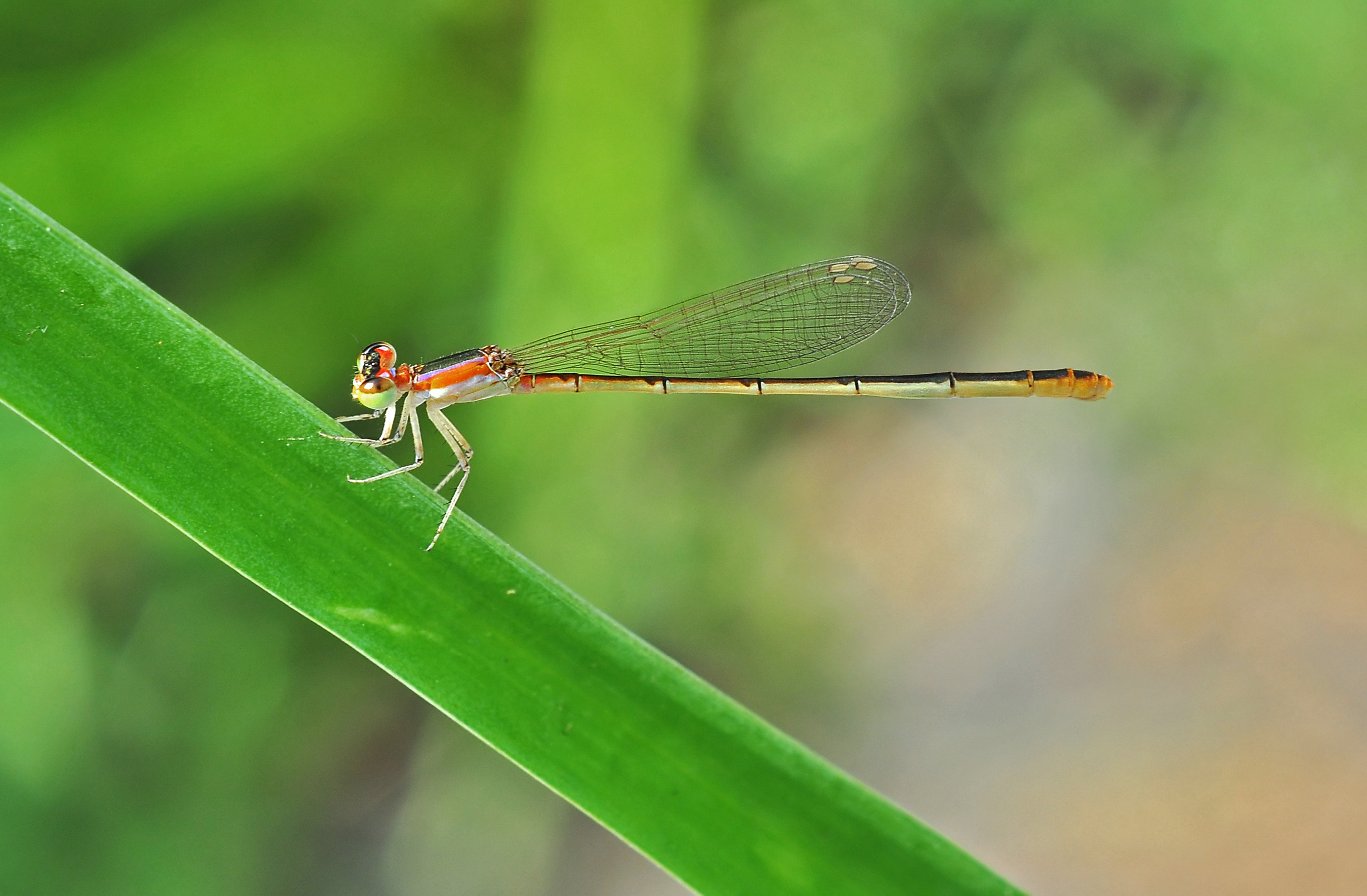
- Female

Conservation status
- Least Concern (IUCN 3.1)

Scientific classification
- Kingdom: Animalia
- Phylum: Arthropoda
- Clade: Pancrustacea
- Class: Insecta
- Order: Odonata
- Suborder: Zygoptera
- Family: Coenagrionidae
- Genus: Agriocnemis
- Species: A. pygmaea

Binomial name
- Agriocnemis pygmaea (Rambur, 1842)

Synonyms
- Agrion pygmaeum Rambur, 1842; Agriocnemis australis Selys, 1877; Agriocnemis velaris Selys, 1882; Agrion kagiensis Matsumura, 1911; Agriocnemis hyacinthus Tillyard, 1913; Agriocnemis corbeti Kumar & Prasad, 1978

= Agriocnemis pygmaea =

Pygmy wisp

Species of damselfly

Agriocnemis pygmaea (pygmy wisp) is a species of damselfly in the family Coenagrionidae. It is also known as wandering midget, pygmy dartlet or wandering wisp. It is well distributed across Asia and parts of Australia.

== Description and habitat ==
Agriocnemis pygmaea is a small damselfly with black capped green eyes, black thorax with apple green stripes on lateral sides. Segments 1 to 7 of its abdomen is black on dorsum and pale green on ventral half. The remaining segments are orange-red. Very old males may get pruinosed on the dorsum of the head and the thorax with snowy white, making all the markings beneath being quite obscured. Female is more robust and exhibits several color morphs. The green color of the male is replaced by red in the females in the red forms. In androchrome forms, the female has same green colors as in the male. Female colour variation is depended on ontogenic colour change associated with sexual development too.

Agriocnemis pygmaea breeds in marshes and ponds.

== Etymology ==
The genus name Agriocnemis is derived from two Greek words: agrion or ἄγριος, meaning wild, and cnemis or κνημίς, meaning legging. Agrion was the name given in 1775 by Johan Fabricius for all damselflies. cnemis is commonly used for many damselflies in the family Coenagrionidae.

The species name pygmaea is from the Greek word for pygmy. In 1842, Jules Pierre Rambur, writing in Latin, started his description of this damselfly: Minimum obscure viridi aenum - very small dark green copper.

== Gallery ==
=== male ===
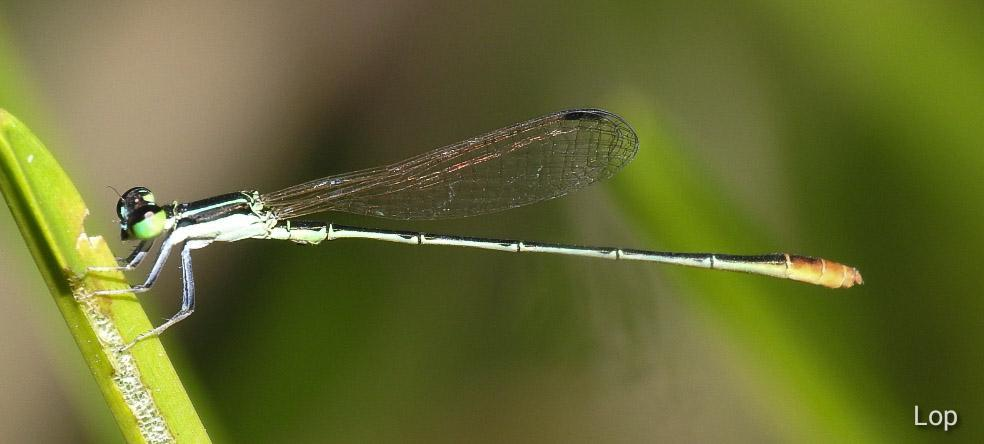
Male with silver pruinescence

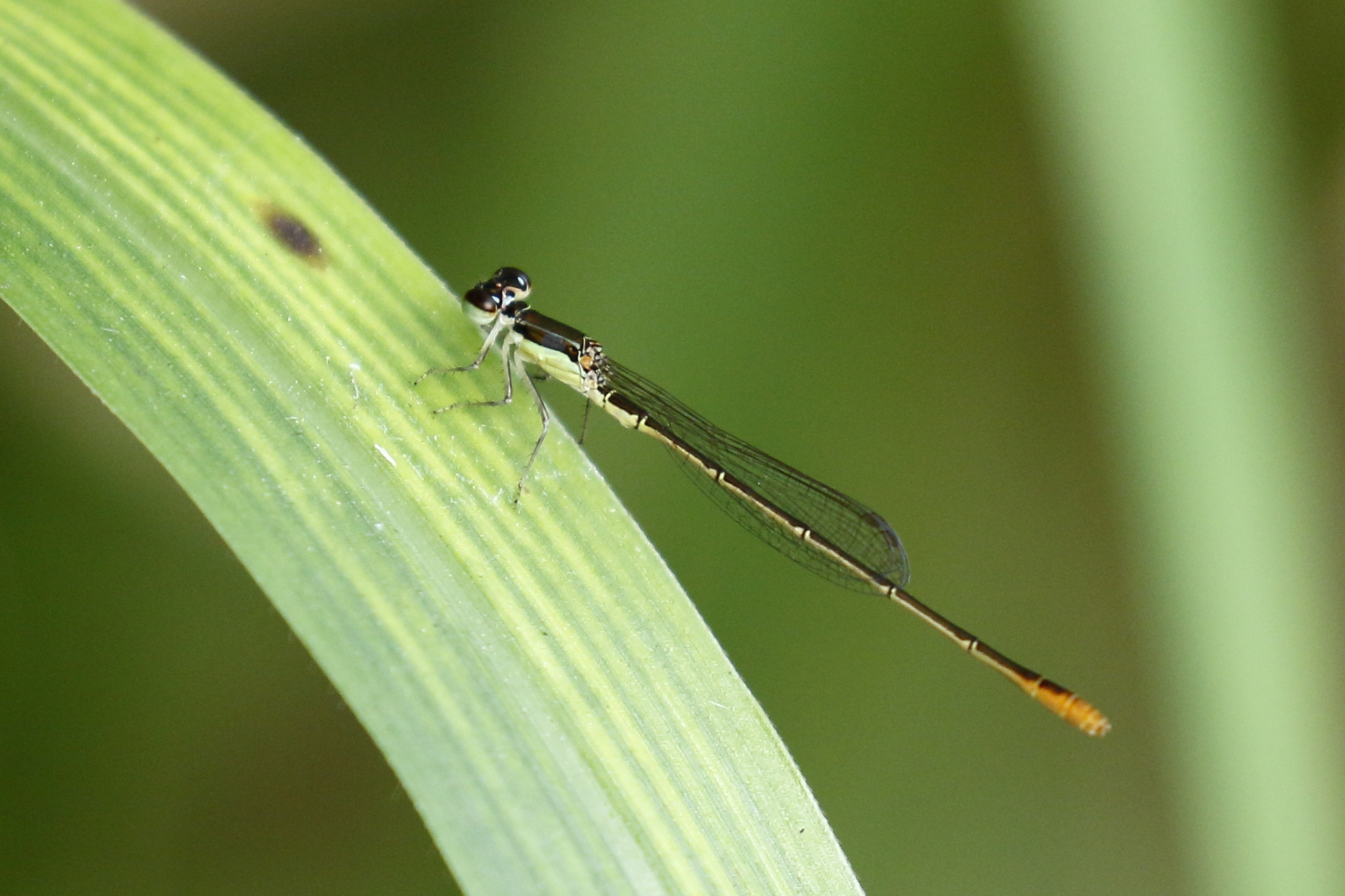
Male

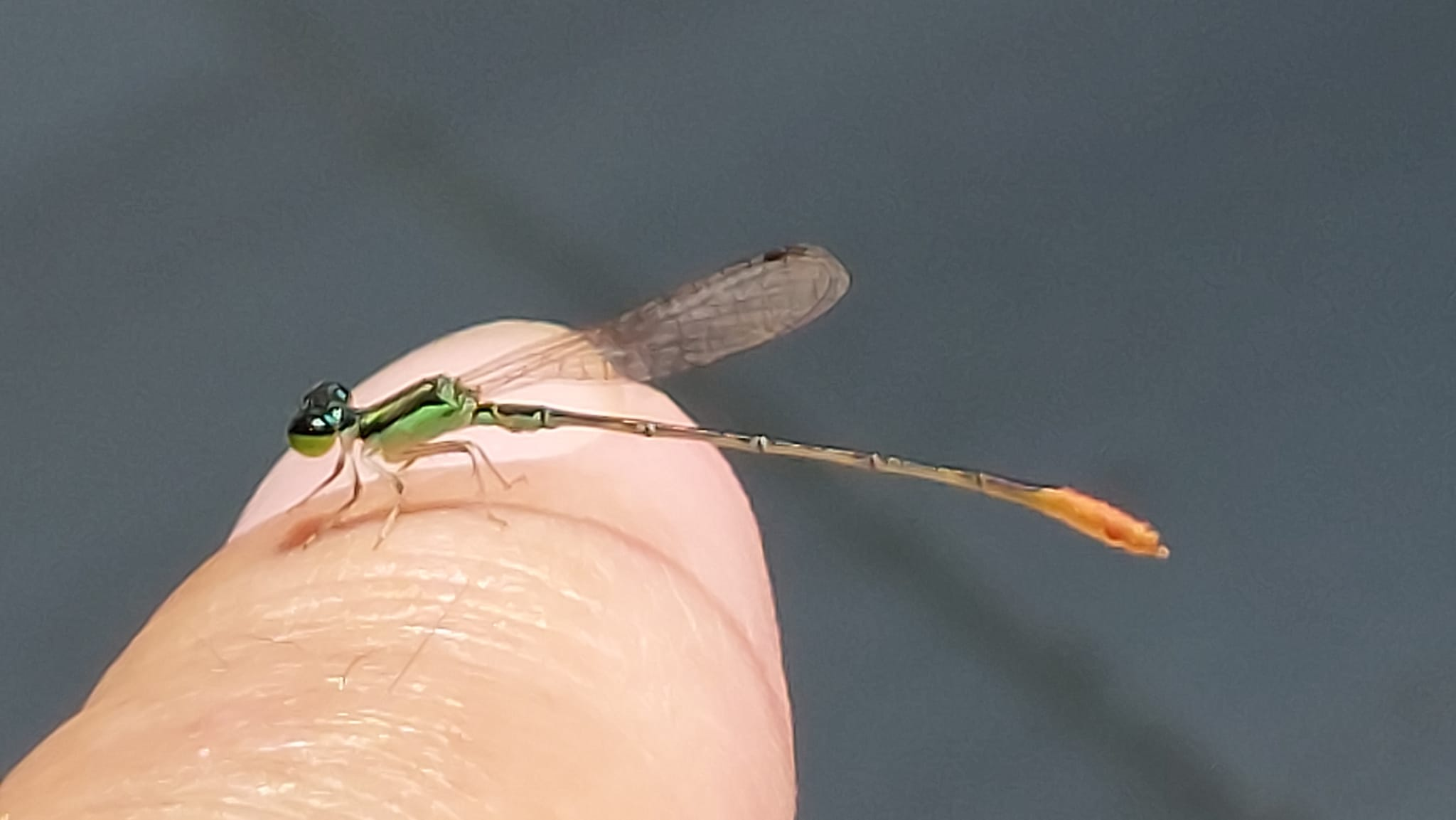
Male, Thailand

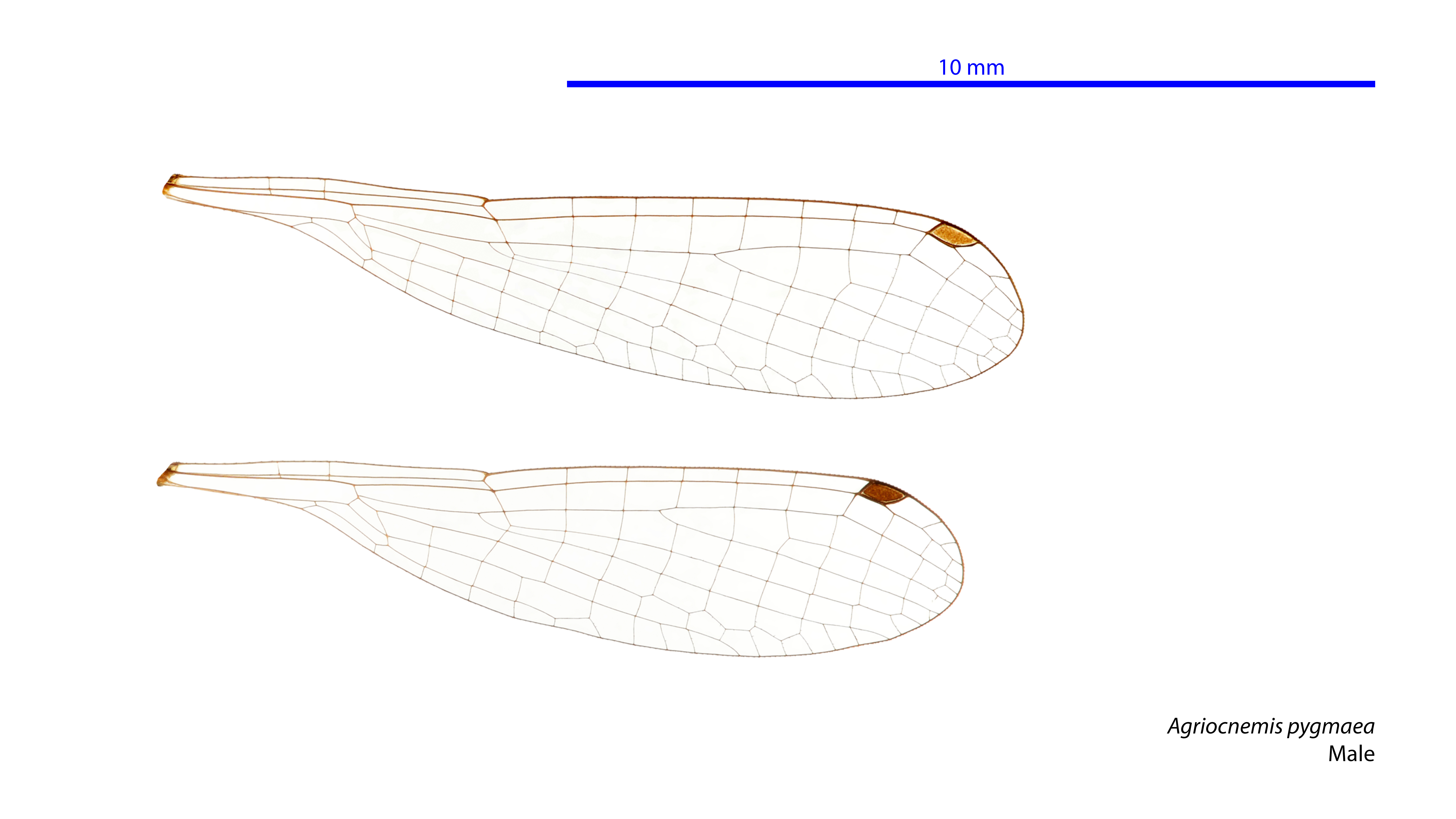
Male wings

=== female ===
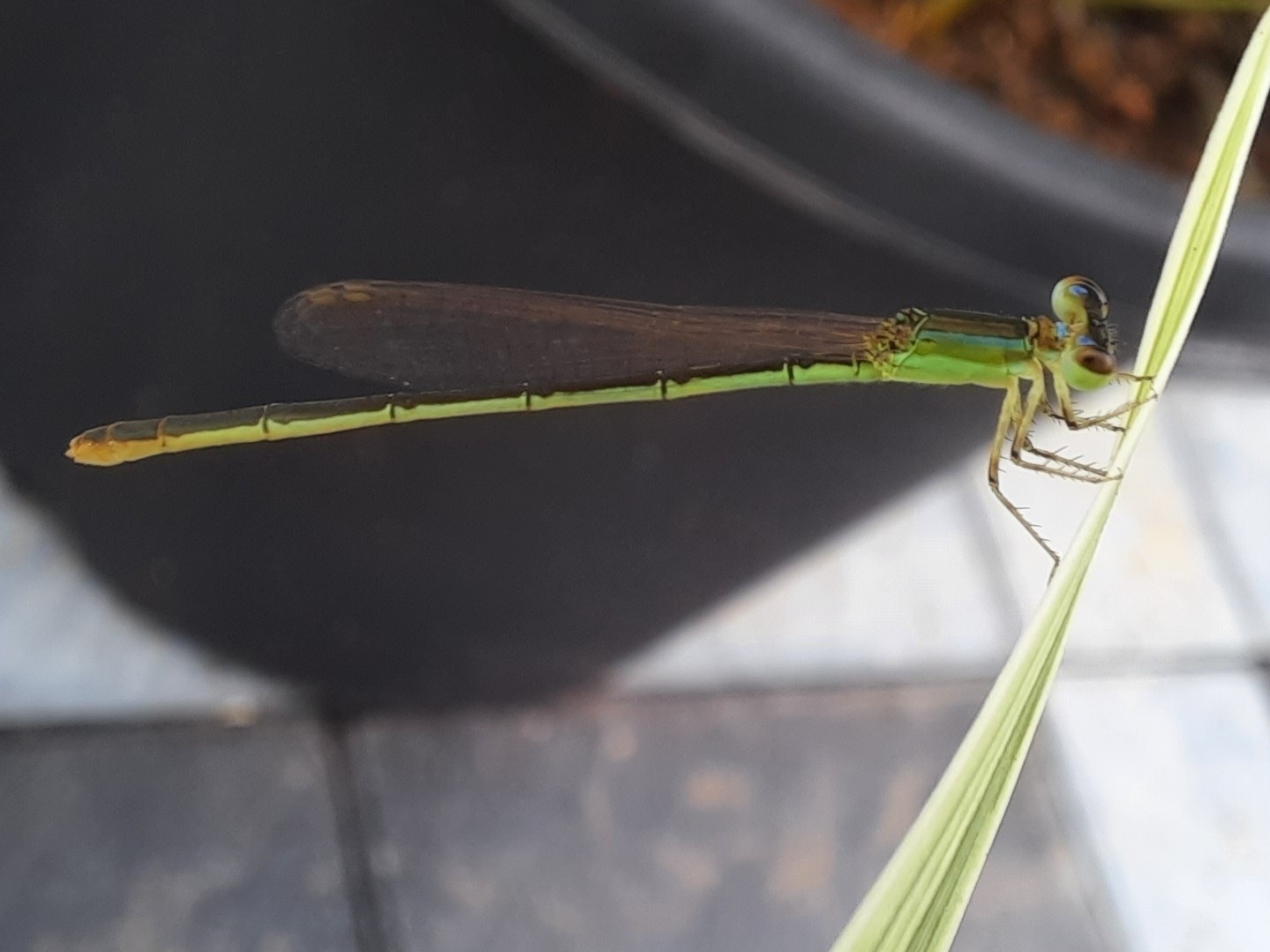
Female

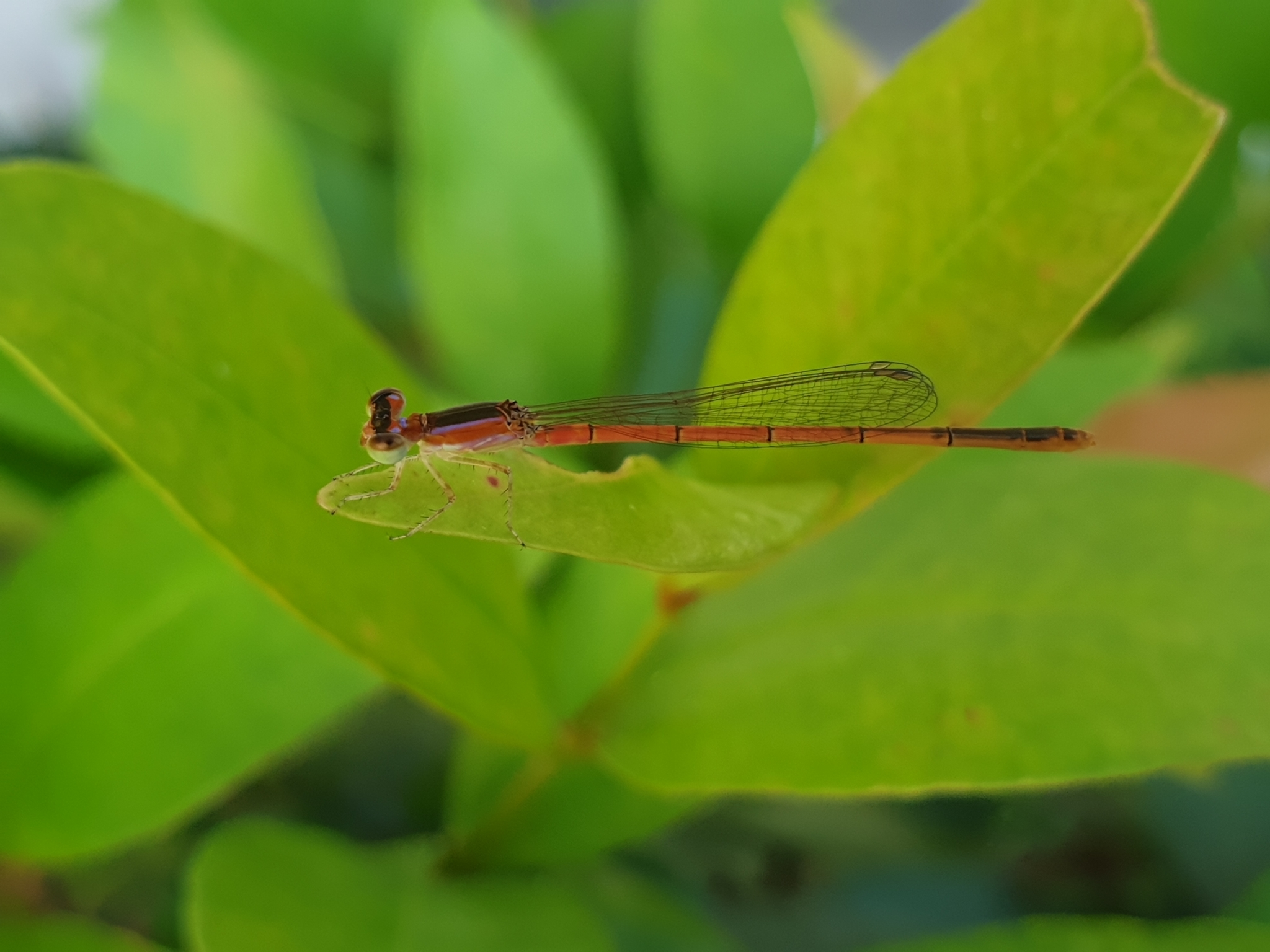
Young female

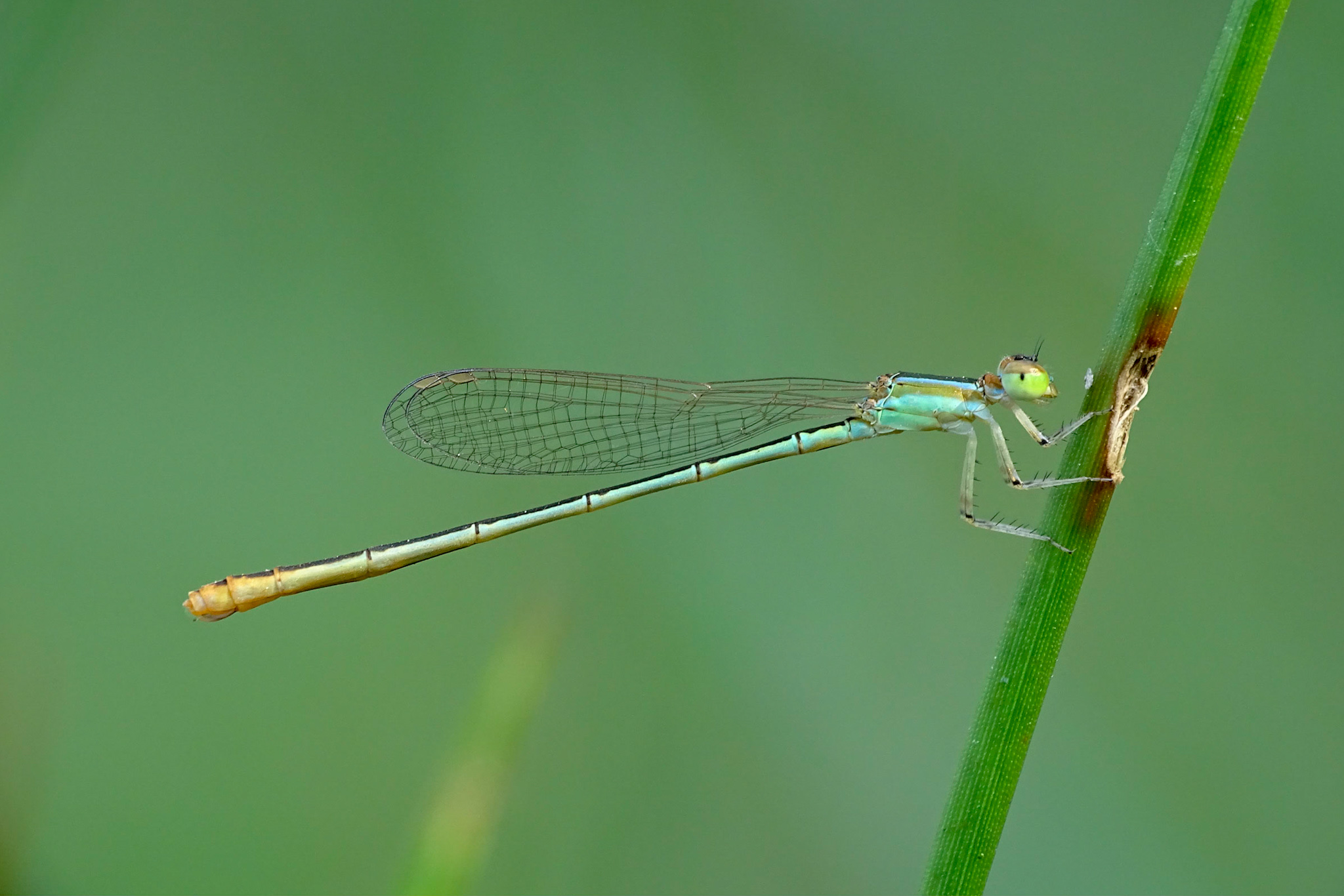
Female (androchrome)

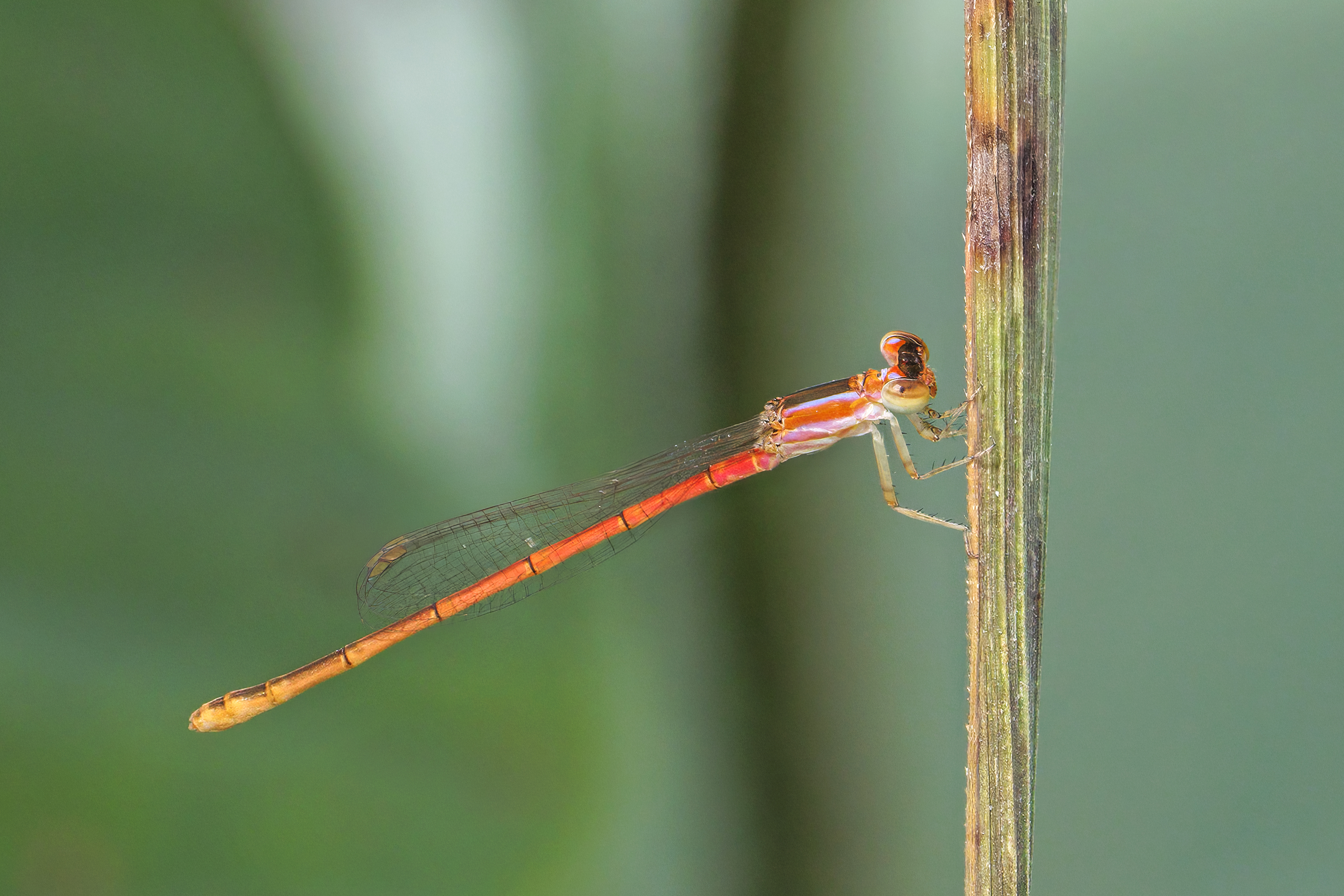
Female (red form)

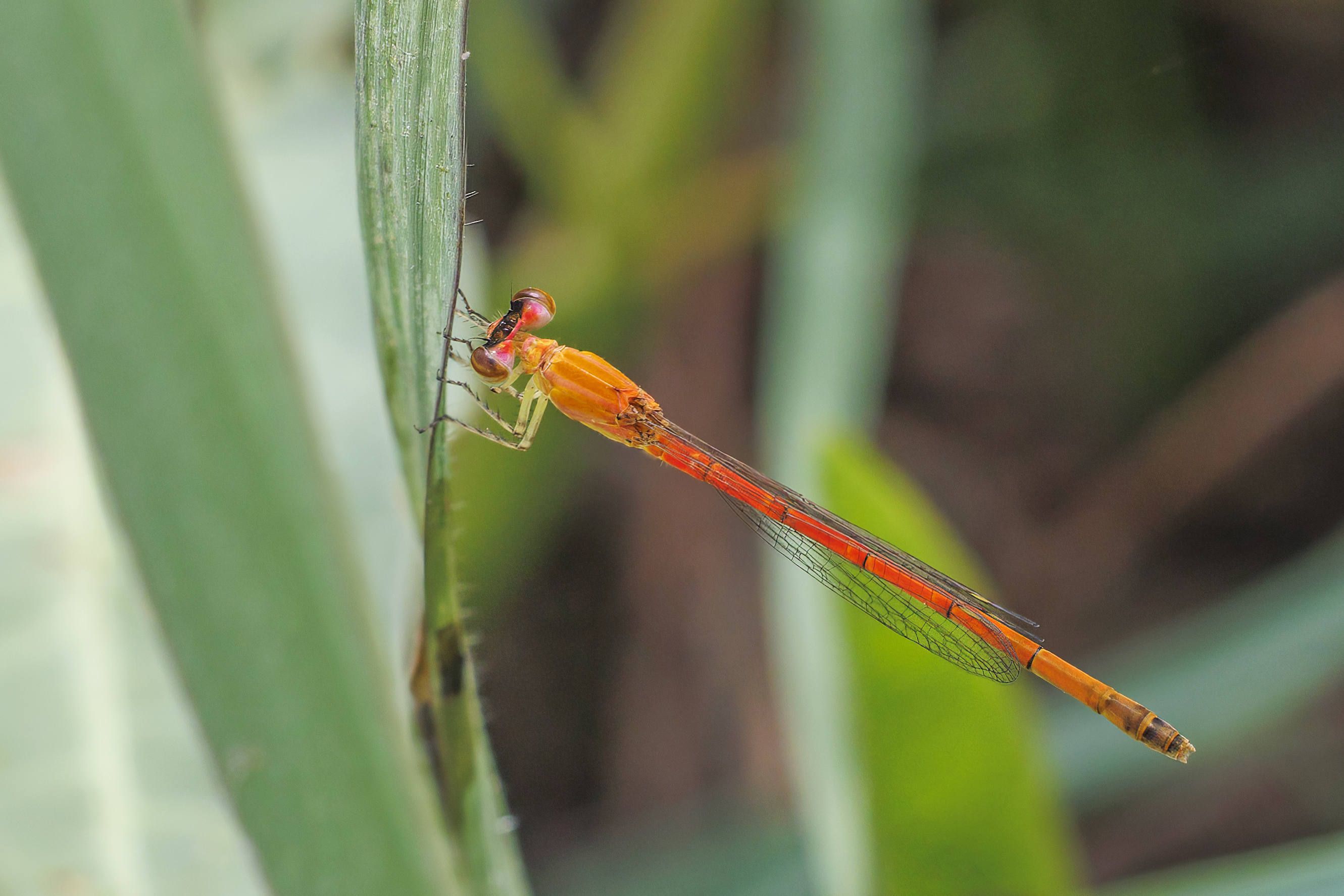
Mature female (red form)

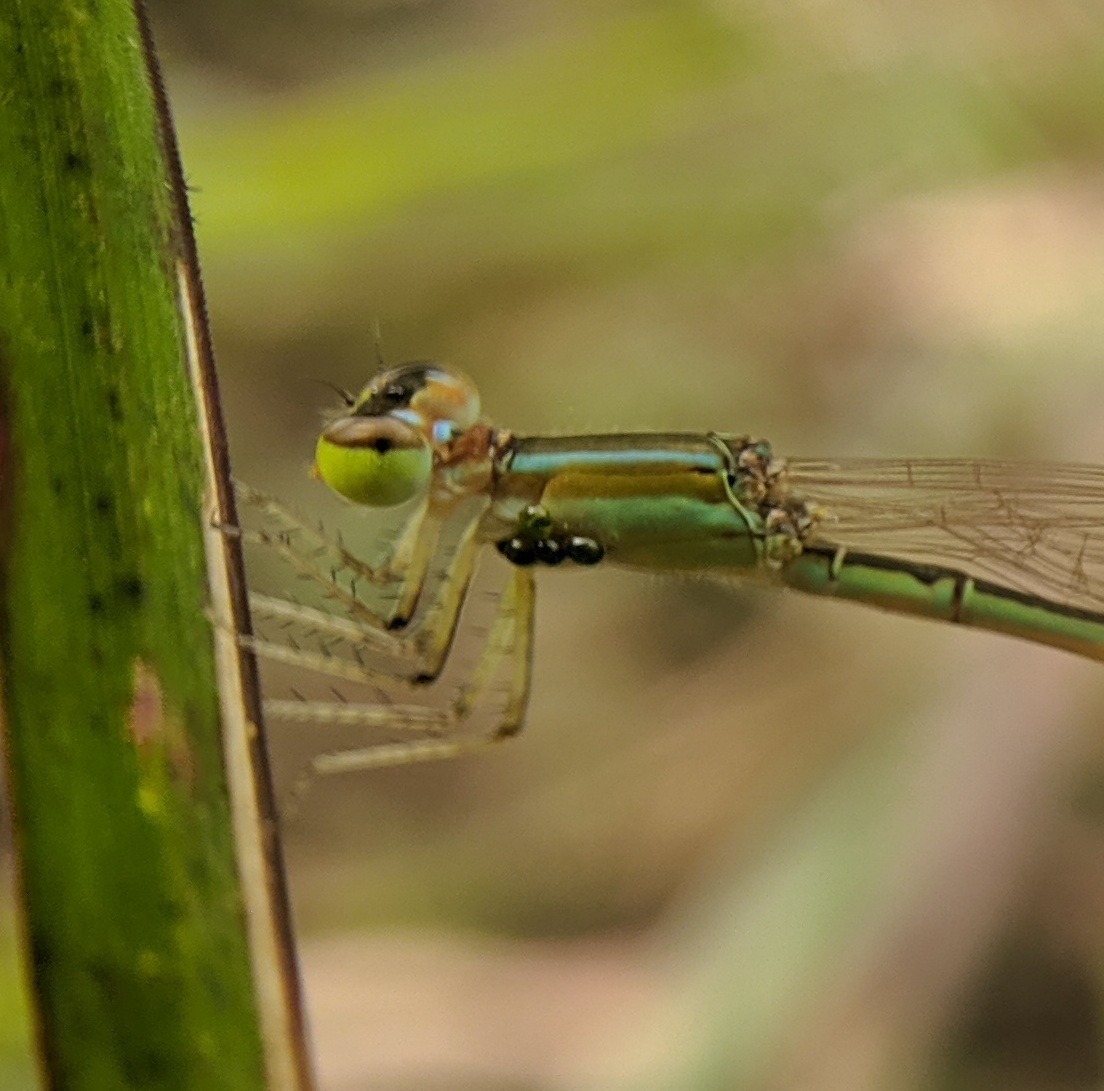
Female with water mites attached to her thorax

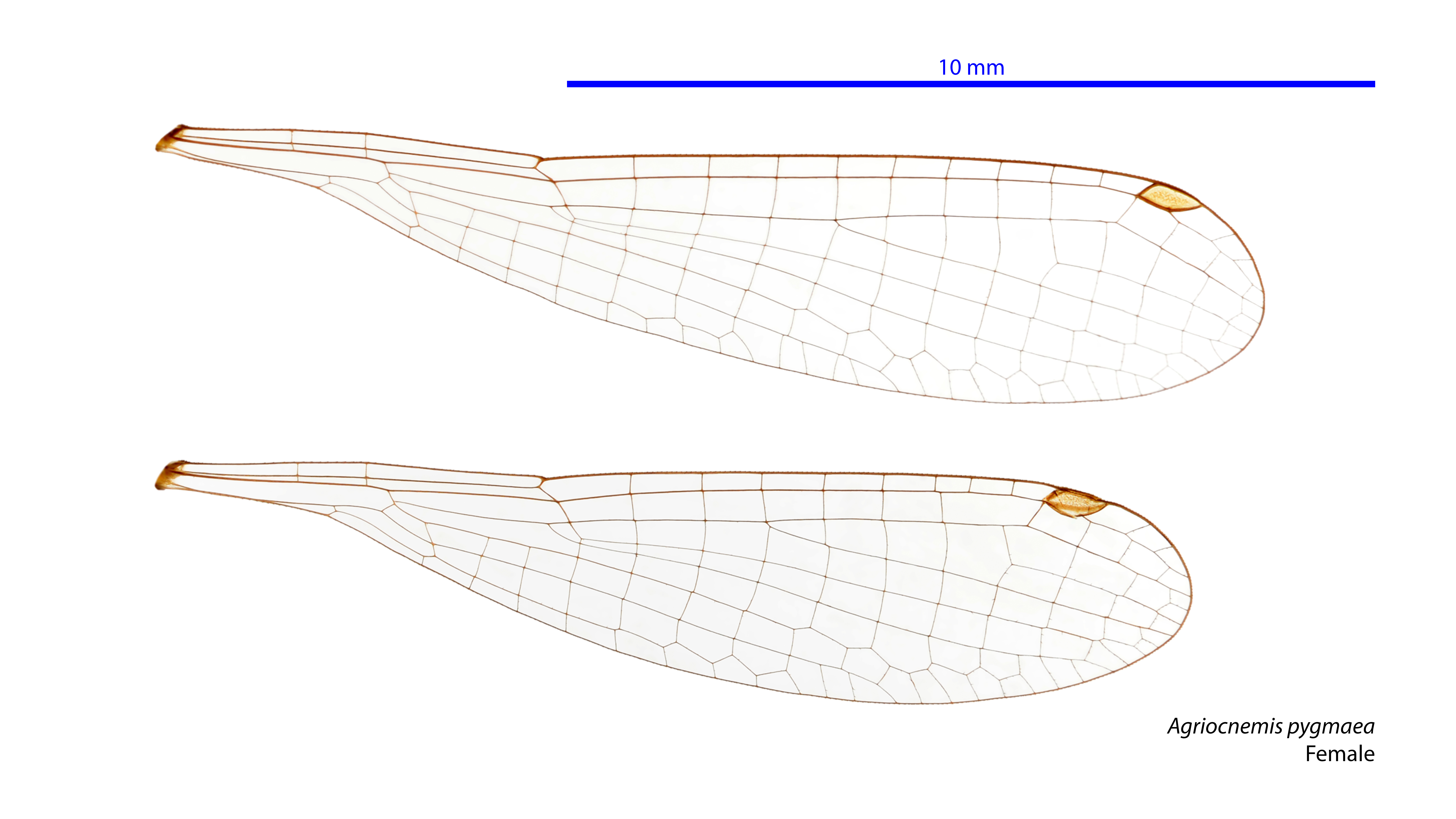
Female wings

== See also ==
- List of odonates of India
- List of odonata of Kerala
- List of Odonata species of Australia
