= Alternative mating strategy =

An alternative mating strategy is a strategy used by male or female animals, often with distinct phenotypes, that differs from the prevailing mating strategy of their sex. Such strategies are diverse and variable both across and within species. Animal sexual behaviour and mate choice directly affect social structure and relationships in many different mating systems, whether monogamous, polygamous, polyandrous, or polygynous. Though males and females in a given population typically employ a predominant reproductive strategy based on the overarching mating system, individuals of the same sex often use different mating strategies. The most common alternative mating strategy is a sneaker morph. Among some reptiles, frogs and fish, large, territorial males compete for females, while small males may use sneaking tactics to mate without being noticed. Ray-finned fish express the most alternative mating strategies of any clade, including satellites that help territorial males, "pirate" males that demonstrate territorial tendencies but periodically attack other parental males for spawning access, and female mimics.

== Strategies and selection ==
Alternative mating strategies have been observed among both male and female animals. Most typically, alternative strategies are adopted in the face of competition within a sex, especially in species that mate multiply. In these scenarios, some individuals adopt very different mating strategies to achieve reproductive success. The result over time is a variety of evolutionarily stable strategies and phenotypes, consisting of both conventional individuals and unconventional individuals who mate through alternative means. Successful strategies are maintained through sexual selection. The coexistence of alternative and traditional mating strategies can maximize the average fitness of the sex in question and be evolutionarily stable for a population. However, the utilization of alternative mating strategies may oscillate as a result of varying reproductive conditions, such as the availability of potential mates. Under changing circumstances, the existence of a variety of strategies allows individuals to choose the conditional behaviour that maximizes their fitness.

=== Selection ===
Conventional and alternative mating behaviours arise through sexual selection. More specifically, varying levels of reproductive success select for phenotypes and strategies that maximize an animal's chance of obtaining a mate. As a result, certain animals successfully use a conventional mating strategy while others employing this strategy fail to obtain mates. Over time, phenotypic variance arises both between and within the sexes, with males exhibiting greater diversity in phenotype. The resulting variance in male fitness creates a niche in which alternative strategies may develop, such as sneaking to obtain a mate. The alternative behaviours persist as part of this polymorphism, or variety of phenotypes, because the average fitness of unconventional males equals the average reproductive success of conventional males.

Alternative behaviours are maintained through frequency-dependent selection because of their equal fitness benefits and functional equivalence. Under frequency-dependent selection, the fitness of a given phenotype is determined by its frequency relative to other phenotypes within a population. Similarly, negative frequency-dependent selection describes a scenario in which rarer phenotypes experience greater fitness. Given that the utilization of alternative mating strategies has been shown to fluctuate over time, it has been suggested that frequency or negative frequency-dependent selection is the mechanism through which alternative mating strategies are maintained in animal populations.

Fitness payoffs of varying mating strategies in relation to status. At s, A and B have equal fitness, and either phenotype may be expressed. Individuals of higher status above point s do better with phenotype A, while those of lower status do better with B.

A second proposed model for the maintenance of alternative mating behaviours is status-dependent selection. This describes a conditional strategy in which the fitness of alternative phenotypes depend on the status, or competitive ability, of an individual. Status includes environmental and genetic factors as well as age and size, and determines the level of fitness that may be obtained from a given phenotype. As shown in Figure 1, the fitness benefits of a given phenotype vary based on whether an individual is of high or low status. In a case where two phenotypes and strategies are possible, such as mate guarding or sneaking, there is an intermediate point of intersection where the fitness gained from these alternative behaviours is equivalent. At this point (s), the fitness gained from these strategies is equal, and the particular strategy employed at a given time depends on an individual's status. A low status individual below the switch point obtains higher fitness with phenotype B, while an individual of high status above the switch point benefits from higher fitness with phenotype A. Such a model shows how individuals of lesser status or competitive ability may maximize their fitness by exhibiting an alternative phenotype. In this manner, these selective forces maintain the phenotypic diversity observed among animals with respect to mating behaviour, though strategies utilized depends on a variety of circumstances.

=== Strategy ===
Most of the organisms in question do not have the cognitive capacity to "strategize" in a logical sense. Here, a strategy is an underlying rule for making decisions about a certain behaviour. A strategy provides an organism with a set of tactics that are adaptive in various circumstances. A tactic is an action taken to achieve a specific goal.

Organisms within a population may not always have the same strategy, and different strategies may offer individuals either a range of tactical options or just one tactic. Furthermore, given strategy may be considered Mendelian, developmental, conditional, or a combination of the above. A Mendelian strategy depends on a genetically determined phenotypic difference, such as body size. This is the case in marine isopods, described below. Developmentally driven strategies are associated with phenotypic differences caused by varying conditions during the course of development that affect body size or overall adult health. Individuals may have a conditional behaviour strategy that depends not on the genetic or developmental impact on one's life circumstance, but on external factors. These may include the number of available mates, or the number of nearby competitors and their employed tactics. Some mating strategies are impacted by multiple factors, so these categorizations of Mendelian, developmental, and conditional are not mutually exclusive. They simply offer ways to think about alternative mating strategies and their root causes.

In any case, the mating strategies employed by organisms in various situations ultimately depend on the strength of selection acting to maintain or eliminate certain reproductive strategies. If sexual selection strongly favors one mating strategy over a potential alternative, individuals not conforming to the successful strategy fail to reproduce.

=== Female assessment of males ===
While the majority of the research into the interactions that lead to alternative mating strategies has a focus on male to male competition, the interaction between males and females plays a significant role in the mating strategy used (see Sexual Selection). Female assessment of the males (see Female Mate Choice) plays a role in the number of males opting to use an alternative mating technique. Females are likely not to choose to mate with males of a lower quality, so these males require alternative mating techniques. The ability of the female to assess possible mates plays a role in the frequency of alternative mating strategies. If a female is unable to assess and choose mates accurately, for example due to time constraints or assessment costs, then males of a lower quality are more likely to be chosen.

The number of mates available to the female affects the frequency of males adopting alternative mating techniques. If the female has a small selection of males to mate with then males of a lower quality are more likely to be chosen by the females as they have fewer options.

=== Evolutionarily stable strategy ===
The diversity of mating strategies within animal populations may be understood through evolutionary game theory concepts that assess the costs and benefits of reproductive decision-making. The Evolutionarily Stable Strategy (ESS) concept provides a particularly useful framework for considering alternative behaviours as they relate to fitness. Given that a strategy describes a set of pre-programmed rules that specify particular behaviours, an evolutionarily stable strategy is one that persists in a population due to its benefits to fitness. An ESS is maintained in a population if it accords higher average fitness than other strategies, or a level of average individual fitness equivalent to all other strategies within the population.

Within an evolutionarily stable strategy, several scenarios are possible, including pure and mixed strategies. A pure strategy is one not affected by chance, in which an individual only expresses one strategic behaviour. In contrast, a mixed strategy describes a scenario involving the probabilistic expression of behaviours among individuals. For example, an individual under a mixed strategy could express one mating tactic, such as sneaking, with a certain frequency and another tactic, such as mate guarding, at all other times. Though a mixed strategy is theoretically possible, it has not been documented in the context of alternative mating behaviours. Instead, a conditional strategy involving alternative behaviours may best characterize alternative mating strategies.

Condition-dependent behaviour in the context of mating may result from changes in resource availability and intrasexual competition for mates. When competition decreases, the expression of alternative behaviours decreases. Changes in mating behaviours, especially among alternative males, have been documented in insects, fish, and amphibians upon removal of dominant males. Additionally, the availability of mates and resources affects the expression of alternative strategies within a sex. The gain or loss of territory has been shown to affect mating approaches among insect species, while the receptivity and spatial distribution of mates impacts tactics used among insects, fish, and mammals. Mating behaviours are affected by an individual's size and age, as smaller or younger individuals are more likely to attempt reproduction through alternative means, including mimicry or sneak tactics. As a result, the ability to choose a behaviour that maximizes fitness under certain circumstances evolves.

== Male strategies ==
Sample of species with alternative mating strategies
Species	Alternative mating strategies
Male
plainfin midshipman (Porichthys notatus)	1: guard nest, court females, sole parental care 2: sneak or female mimicry
ruff (Philomachus pugnax)	1: court females 2: sneak
scorpionflies (Panorpa sp.)	1: court and give nuptial gift of insect carcass 2: court and give nuptial gift of nutrient-rich saliva 3: force copulate
Female
diving beetles (family Dystiscidae)	female resistant to male mating attempts
side-blotched lizard (Uta stansburiana)	not known, but morphs differ in hormones, life history traits and immune function
gouldian finch (Erythrura gouldiae)	differ in hormones, life history traits and immune function

Males in a wide variety of animal populations practice alternative mating strategies to maximize their reproductive fitness. This is especially common when there is male-male competition for access to mates. Where such alternative strategies are as successful at obtaining mates as the predominant strategy, a coexistence of different mating strategies evolves.

=== Sneaking behaviour in males ===
"Sneaking" is any strategy that allows a male to access a female partner, avoiding more dominant males, for example those guarding a harem, as in the red deer and elephant seal. The behaviour occurs in many different animal groups, including birds (for example, the ruff), reptiles (for example, the marine iguana), fish (for example, the cichlid Herichthys minckleyi), and invertebrates (for example, Phanaeus beetles).

In horned beetles Onthophagus acuminatus, males that receive high levels of nutrition during development surpass a size threshold above which they develop large horns. Males who do not pass the threshold develop either small or nonexistent horns. These varying phenotypes lead individual males to adopt different mating strategies. Males that develop long horns practice mate guarding, protecting the entrance to the tunnel in which a female is resting or feeding. These males fight any male that attempts to enter. This is common in populations where females are dispersed and have synchronized periods of fertility, and in those where females live in clusters that can be guarded to maintain access to more than one female. Smaller males with small or no horns have little chance of beating larger males, and thus adopt an alternative sneaking strategy, digging a new tunnel to intercept the female's tunnel without being noticed by the guarding male. Both of these strategies are reproductively effective for the males practicing them, resulting in a dimorphic male population.

In the pygmy swordtail Xiphophorus multilineatus, some males mature later at a larger size and always use courtship behaviour, while other males mature early at a smaller size, sometimes using courtship behaviour when alone with a female, but more often using sneaky behaviour. This behaviour is not preferred by the female, and is therefore not as successful as courtship in gaining matings, however the higher probability of surviving to reach sexual maturity due to maturing early is enough to maintain the smaller, sneakier males in the population.

Male red paper wasps, Polistes canadensis, engage in the role of the patroller as an alternative mating tactic to the role of the territorial male (who chases away intruders). Patrollers have a smaller body size than territorial males. There is significant competition over the possession of territories. Although these territories do not necessarily hold any resources or nesting sites, owning a territory tends to lead to a greater number of mating opportunities. Males attract females to these territories by rubbing their abdomens across the territories to apply pheromones. Because of their inability to successfully compete against the larger territorial males for territories, smaller males resort to patrolling. But patrollers do not just wait around for territories to be vacated; they sneak matings with females in territories when the territorial males are temporarily away or distracted.

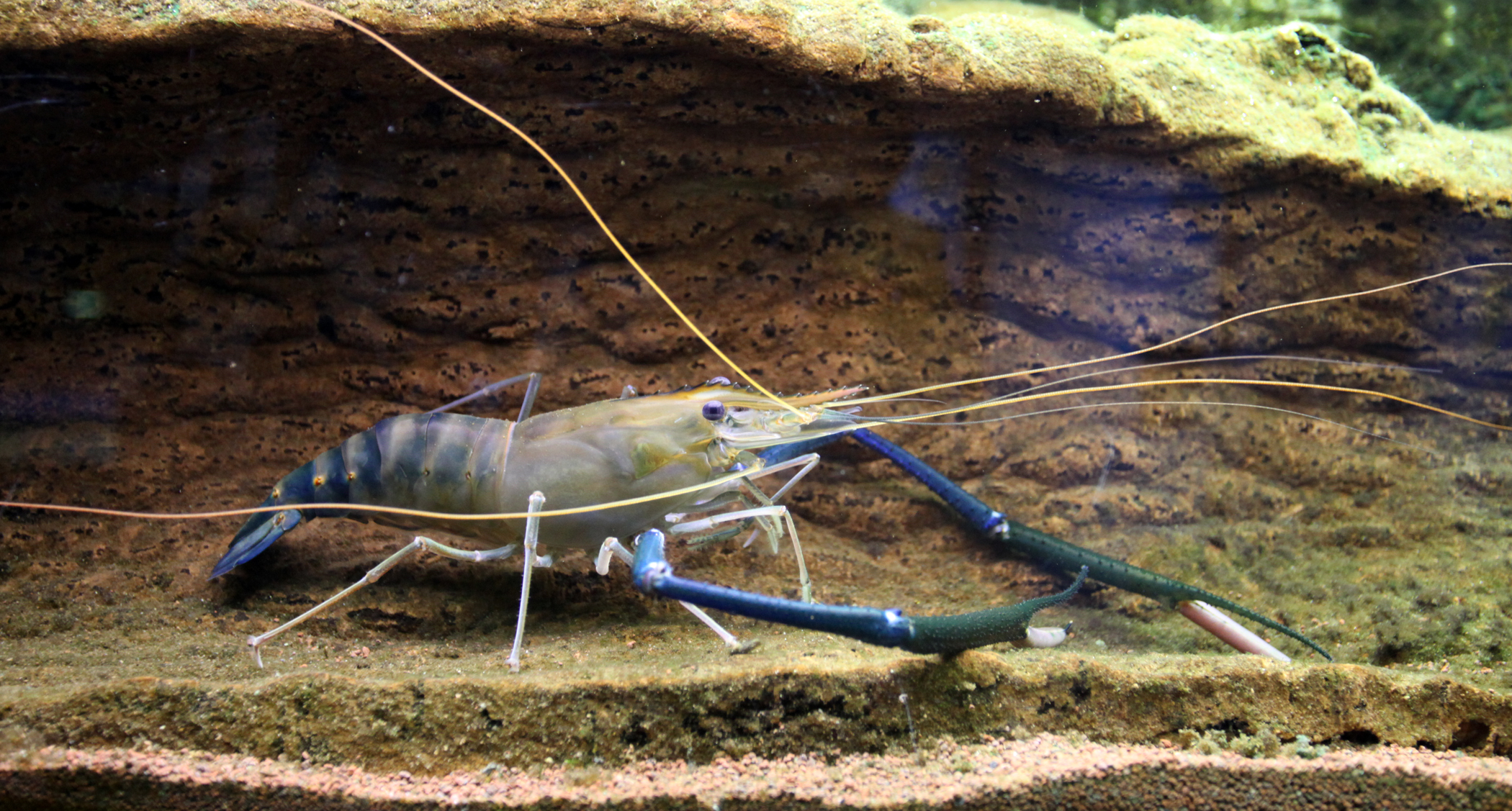
Macrobrachium rosenbergii - blue claw

Macrobrachium rosenbergii (giant freshwater prawns or giant river prawns) males have three distinctive body types (morphotypes) upon reaching sexual maturity - small males, orange claw and blue claw. Despite their varying physical size, claw length, behaviour and anatomy, they are all able to fertilize females. This leads to male competition over females. The dominant males tend to be blue claw over orange claw, then orange claw over small males. Dominance is dependent upon their fighting abilities for food supplies, shelter and therefore female mates. Small males, being significantly smaller than the other two types are unable to fight off other males, and instead apply the tactic of sneaking. The small male attempts to fertilize a female while she is being guarded by a blue claw mate. This is a high risk tactic, as they have a chance of being killed or injured by the larger blue claw males with a limited chance of achieving fertilization. Orange claw males are unable to perform sneak tactics as they are larger than small males; nor can they successfully fight against larger blue claws. This means they are a small population percentage in nature due to their low fertilization rates.

With regard to their throat color, the males of the common side-blotched lizard Uta stansburiana can be distinguished into three morphotypes which compete against each other for reproduction. Males with an orange-colored throat aggressively claim a large territory for themselves to build a harem. Meanwhile, the males with a blue-colored throat are less dominant, but guard their mating partner from other males. Finally, males with a yellow-colored throat mimic the female phenotype and rely on a sneaking strategy. From that polymorphism, a rock-paper-scissor like game emerges: the dominant orange-colored males take females from the blue-colored males by force, the blue-colored males are able to protect their females from the yellow-colored males, which in turn are able to sneak into the harem of orange-colored males.

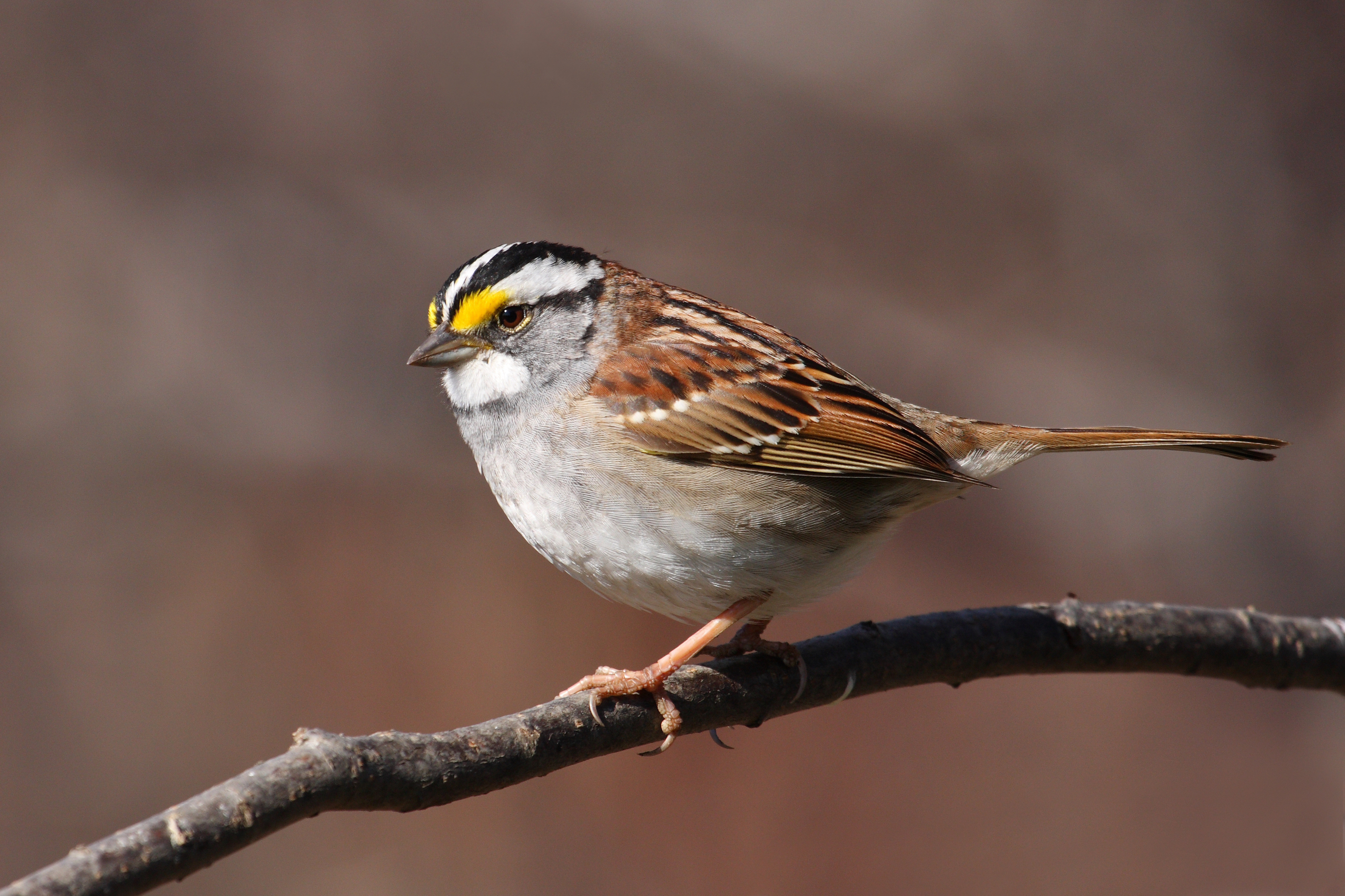
White-throated sparrow

White-throated sparrows Zonotrichia albicollis express different coloured plumages related to differing levels of aggression, guarding of territory, and promiscuity. The variation in plumage colours is determined by an inversion mutation on chromosome 2. This strategy is determined by genetics rather than biological fitness.

Bluegill sunfish Lepomis macrochirus males have two distinct patterns of reproduction and survival: parental and cuckolder. Parental sunfish often show dominant mating strategies such as courting with females, building nests for the young and caring for young independently. The cuckolder sunfish are much less dominant than the parental males and tend to revert to alternative mating strategies including sneaking or female mimicry. The fitness of the individual males is the main determining factor of which mating strategy they use.

=== Satellite behavior in males ===
Ocellated wrasse Symphodus ocellatus males have three behavioral morphs: parental (or territorial), sneaker (or cuckold), and satellite. Satellite males do not have male sexually selected traits that parental males exhibit, such as distinct coat patterns. In contrast with sneaker males that attempt to steal fertilization events, satellite males help territorial males defend territory and care for eggs in return for their own fertilization of eggs. Male wrasse can transition between phenotypes.

=== Female mimicry by males ===
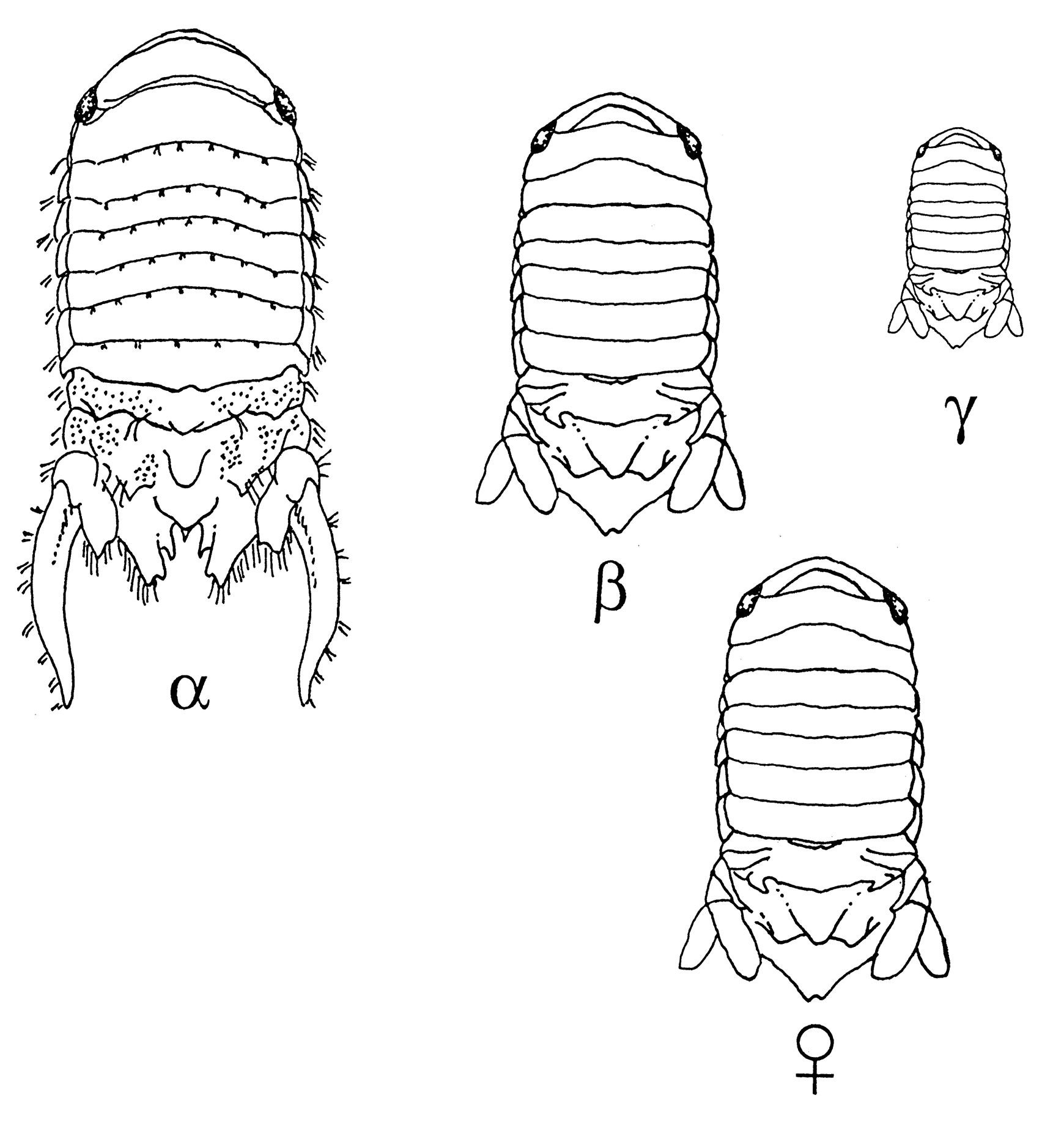
Paracerceis sculpta, a marine isopod with three male morphs: one mimics females, while the smallest is a sneak.

Males may mimic females to gain access to mates in areas where only females congregate. In the marine isopod Paracerceis sculpta there are three genetically distinct male morphs. Alpha males, which represent the largest and most common male morph, defend harems to monopolize access to a large number of females. This is the predominant mating strategy in this species. Beta males are about the same size as female isopods, and they take advantage of that fact by mimicking female behaviour in order to enter harems and gain access to fertile females. Gamma males are the smallest morph. These individuals adopt a sneaking strategy and rely on their small body size to enter harems undetected and remain in them while they seek mating opportunities. These distinct strategies, all determined by a single genetic locus, give equivalent lifetime mating success to each of the three morphs, indicating that natural selection is not acting on one morph more strongly than another. All three alleles expressed in the population will continue to contribute to male morphology as long as the reproductive success granted by each one continues to be as beneficial as the others.

=== Genetic basis for male strategies ===
Several species of fish express Y-linked haplotypes that delineate male morphs, including the African cichlid (Lamprologus callipterus) and the melanzona guppy (Poecilia parae). Behavior and coloration phenotypes are Y-linked and regulated by balancing selection. These Y-linked traits formed after Y chromosome recombination stopped, and were generated from interspersed repeats as a result of transposons.

== Female strategies ==
Alternative female strategies have not been studied extensively, for two reasons. First, male mating behaviour is often driven by competition for mates, such as physical competition, territoriality, or parental care investment. However, females typically do not compete directly for these resources or mates. Instead, females indirectly compete through differences in premating, mating and post-mating behaviour. The subtle nature of female competition makes alternative behaviours very difficult to study relative to males. Second, males are more likely to experience sexual selection than females. Due to this increased selection, it is statistically more likely for alternative strategies to evolve in males than females. However, though subtle and slightly less commonly, females can experience limitations in access to males and male parental care. Thus, alternative female strategies have evolved to circumvent these limitations. Below are some examples of alternative female strategies seen in nature.

=== Copying mate choice ===
In the guppy, Poecilia reticulata, females will copy another female's mate choice if given the opportunity to watch the other female choose. While older females do not copy younger females, younger females will copy older females. This copying behaviour arises from a difference in ability to assess males. Since this behaviour only arises when in the presence of another female, it is a behavioural alternative to the norm of just choosing a male mate based on personal assessment.

=== Sneaking in females ===
In the damselfish, Chromis multilineata, females often become infected with the parasite Anilocra chromis. Males do not allow infected females into the nest and do not mate with them. To bypass this limitation to mating, infected females often sneak into male nests.

=== Male mimicry by females ===
In damselflies, Ischnura, females are frequently harassed by males that wish to mate. There is significant variation in the females' physical abilities to tolerate male mating harassment. In this species, there is a physical dimorphism: one type is cryptic (heteromorphic) and the other type looks like a male (andromorph). In many cases the andromorph even behaves like a male when among other males. Studies have found that the andromorph only mates half as often as the heteromorph. While a decrease in mating would be devastating for males, it is often an advantage in females. For females, excessive mating is a waste of time and energy and it increases exposure to predators. Thus, the ability to ward off extra mating gives the andromorphs a frequency dependent selective advantage. This is example of a traditionally male characterized Mendelian alternative strategy that has now been observed in females.

== See also ==
- Mating system
