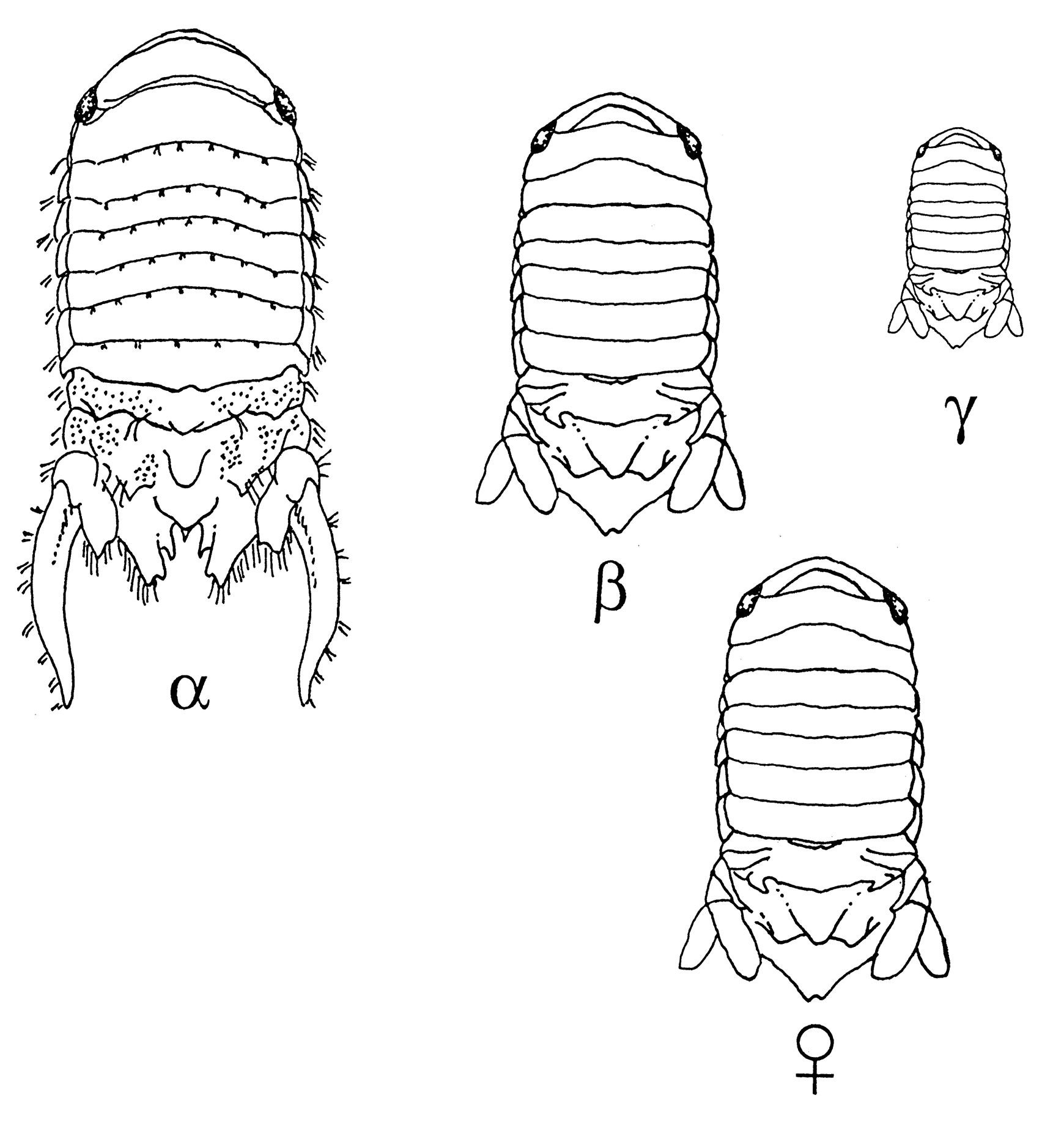
- An illustration showing the relative sizes and shapes of the different forms of Paracerceis sculpta

Scientific classification
- Kingdom: Animalia
- Phylum: Arthropoda
- Class: Malacostraca
- Order: Isopoda
- Family: Sphaeromatidae
- Genus: Paracerceis; Hansen, 1905

= Paracerceis =

Genus of crustaceans

Paracerceis is a genus of isopod crustaceans in the family Sphaeromatidae. It contains the following species:

- Paracerceis caudata (Say, 1818)
- Paracerceis cohenae Kensley, 1984
- Paracerceis cordata (Richardson, 1899)
- Paracerceis dollfusi Lombardo, 1985
- Paracerceis edithae Boone, 1930
- Paracerceis gilliana (Richardson, 1899)
- Paracerceis glynni Kensley, 1984
- Paracerceis holdichi Kussakin & Malyutina, 1993
- Paracerceis nuttingi (Boone, 1921)
- Paracerceis richardsonae Lombardo, 1988
- Paracerceis sculpta (Holmes, 1904)
- Paracerceis spinulosa Espinosa-Perez & Hendrickx, 2002
- Paracerceis tomentosa Schultz & McCloskey, 1967
