= Sneak =

Sneak or Sneaky may refer to:

- DJ Sneak, Puerto Rican born American house music DJ and producer Carlos Sosa (born 1969)
- Quarterback sneak, an American football play
- Sneak magazine, a British weekly magazine published from 2002 to 2006
- "Sneak" (novel), a 2012 apocalyptic novel by Evan Angler
- Wiley Sneak, a main character on the British children's game show Trapped! (TV series)
- Sneaky (gamer), gamer name of Zachary Scuderi, a professional League of Legends player, streamer, and prominent crossplayer
- Sneaky, a female professional wrestler half of the tag-team Stinky and Sneaky from the Gorgeous Ladies of Wrestling
- Sneaks (musician), stage name used by the artist Eva Moolchan
- Sneaks, a 2020 oil on linen painting by Julia Rommel
- "Sneaky" (song), a 2024 song by 21 Savage
- Sneaks (film), a 2025 animated film

== See also ==
- "Sneakin'", 2016 song by rappers Drake and 21 Savage
- Sneaking suit
- Sneaking (biology), a strategy that allows males to gain access to a female while avoiding more dominant males
- Sneaky Sneaky
