= Paracerceis edithae =

Scientific classification
- Kingdom: Animalia
- Phylum: Arthropoda
- Class: Malacostraca
- Order: Isopoda
- Family: Sphaeromatidae
- Genus: Paracerceis
- Species: P. edithae

Binomial name
- Paracerceis edithae Boone, 1930

Species of crustacean

Paracerceis edithae is a species of marine isopod. It lives below the intertidal zone in the Caribbean Sea. It was first classified in 1930 after being found in Haiti but was rediscovered in 1972 in Puerto Rico.
