= Sneaker (album) =

Studio album by Sneaker
- Released: October 19, 1981
- Recorded: Village Recorders (Los Angeles) Cherokee Studios (Hollywood)
- Genres: Rock; soft rock
- Length: 36:52
- Label: Handshake
- Producer: Jeffrey Baxter

Sneaker chronology
Sneaker (1981)	Loose in the World (1982)

Singles from Sneaker
- 1. "More Than Just the Two of Us" Released: October 1981; 2. "Don't Let Me In" Released: 1982

Sneaker is the debut album by the band Sneaker. It was released on October 19, 1981, on Handshake Records.

It contains the hit single, "More Than Just the Two of Us" (which peaked at number 34 in the U.S. charts, and number 17 on the Adult Contemporary chart).

== Background and recording ==
The album's lead track, "Don't Let Me In", was written by Steely Dan's Walter Becker and Donald Fagen, who recorded a songwriting demo of it in the late 1960s. However, Sneaker were the first artist to record the song for release.

Michael Carey Schneider wrote the opening to "More Than Just the Two of Us" on piano, influenced by Barry Manilow, and Mitch Crane then wrote the vocal melody and lyrics. The lyrics were written about Crane's pending separation and divorce from his wife. A demo was recorded with Crane singing lead, but he struggled to reach the notes he had written, and rather than transpose the song to a key he could more easily sing, he suggested Schneider sing the lead.

Schneider said of the song "Jaymes", "That’s one of my most jazziest chord progressions I’ve ever written. That was inspired by 'You Belong to Me' by Michael McDonald [sic - McDonald co-wrote "You Belong to Me" with Carly Simon, and he never recorded it as a solo artist]. It was written about a real person, Jaymes Foster, David Foster's sister."

== Track listing ==
All tracks are written by Mitch Crane and Michael Carey Schneider, except where noted.

Side one
No.	Title	Writer(s)	Length
1.	"Don't Let Me In"	Walter Becker; Donald Fagen	4:13
2.	"More Than Just the Two of Us"		4:21
3.	"One by One"		2:50
4.	"Jaymes"		3:44
5.	"In Time"		4:38

Side two
No.	Title	Writer(s)	Length
6.	"Get Up, Get Out"		3:32
7.	"Looking for Someone Like You"	Crane; Schneider; Michael Cottage	4:01
8.	"Millionaire"	Schneider	4:22
9.	"No More Lonely Days"	Crane; Jim King	5:11
Total length:			36:52

== Personnel ==
=== Sneaker ===
- Tim Torrance – guitars
- Mitch Crane – guitars, lead vocals (1, 3, 4, 9), backing vocals
- Michael Carey Schneider – keyboards, lead vocals (2, 5, 6–8), backing vocals
- Jim King – keyboards, synthesizers, vibes
- Michael Cottage – bass, backing vocals
- Mike Hughes – drums, backing vocals

==== Additional musicians ====
- Jeffrey Baxter – guitars, guitar solo (1, 9)
- David Woodford – saxophone solo (3)
- Ed Greene – drums (4)
- John Raymond – bass (4)
- David Foster – Clavinet (4)
- Lon Price – saxophone solo (4)
- Bobby LaKind – percussion (4)
- Sherlie Mathews – backing vocals (9)
- Paulette Brown – backing vocals (9)
- Cleopatra Kennedy – backing vocals (9)
- Jimmie Haskell – string and French horn arrangements

=== Technical ===
- Produced by Jeffrey Baxter
- Engineered by Larold Rebhun
- Additional engineering – Al Schmitt, Wayne Neuendorf, Jeffrey Baxter
- Assistant engineers – Clif Jones, Sheridan Eldridge, John Hanlon, Krohn McHenry, Karen Siegel
- Mastered by Stephen Marcussen at Precision Lacquer (Hollywood, CA)
- Production coordinator – Marylata Kastner
- Photography – Sam Emerson
- Illustrations – Susan McDonnell
- Design – Tommy Steele/Art Hotel
- Management and direction – Shelly Weiss
