= Sneaker (band) =

American rock band (1977–1983)

- Promotional band photograph with logo

Background information
- Origin: Los Angeles, California
- Genres: Pop rock, soft rock
- Years active: 1977–1983
- Labels: Handshake Records and Tapes

Sneaker was a West Coast American rock band, active from 1977 to 1983. The band is best known for its Billboard Hot 100 top 40 hit single, "More Than Just the Two of Us", from its first album, Sneaker (1981). They also had a minor hit with "Don't Let Me In", a song written by Donald Fagen and Walter Becker.

Sneaker was composed of Tim Torrance on guitars, Mitch Crane on vocals and guitars, Michael Carey Schneider on vocals and keyboards, Mike Hughes on drums, Michael Cottage on bass guitar, and Jim King on keyboards and vibraphone. The band cited as its primary musical influences Steely Dan, Eagles and The Doobie Brothers. They released two studio albums on Handshake Records and Tapes: Sneaker in 1981 (which included their Top 40 hit, "More Than Just the Two of Us") and Loose in the World in 1982. Both albums were produced by Jeff "Skunk" Baxter, a former member of both Steely Dan and The Doobie Brothers. In 2001, Cool Sound Records, a Japanese record label, released Early On, a collection of their early recordings and, in 2003, released Footprints In Japan, a 1982 live recording from Osaka & Tokyo, Japan.

== History ==
Childhood friends Michael Carey Schneider and Mitch Crane formed a duo named Schneider and Crane in the early 1970s. They later met up with bassist Michael Cottage, and the three of them put together the group Sneaker. The group's name was taken from the Steely Dan song "Bad Sneakers". They played primarily original songs written by Schneider, Crane, and King.

Sneaker were especially popular in Japan, and following the release of their second album Loose in the World, they did a tour there in the summer of 1982. Shortly after their return, the record label they were contracted with, Handshake Records, was dissolved, leaving Sneaker adrift. Though the group tried to soldier on for a time, Mitch Crane quit, and Michael Carey Schneider opted not to continue Sneaker without him.

== Discography ==
=== Albums ===
Date	Title	US 200
1981	Sneaker	149
1982	Loose in the World	—
2003	Early On	—
2011	The Unreleased Demos	—

=== Singles ===
Date	Title	US 100	US AC	US Rock
1981	"More Than Just the Two of Us"	34	17	—
1981	"Get Up, Get Out"	—	—	—
1982	"Don't Let Me In"	63	—	25
1982	"Get Up, Get Out"	—	—	—

== See also ==
- List of one-hit wonders in the United States
