= Sexual mimicry =

Strategy where one sex mimics the opposite sex

Sexual mimicry occurs when one sex mimics the opposite sex in its behavior, appearance, or chemical signalling.

It is more commonly seen within invertebrate species, although sexual mimicry is also seen among vertebrates such as spotted hyenas.

Sexual mimicry is commonly used as a mating strategy to gain access to a mate, a defense mechanism to avoid more dominant individuals, or a survival strategy. It can also be a physical characteristic that establishes an individual's place in society. Sexual mimicry is employed differently across species and it is part of their strategy for survival and reproduction.

Examples of intraspecific sexual mimicry in animals include the spotted hyena, certain types of fish, passerine birds and some species of insect.

Interspecific sexual mimicry can also occur in some plant species, especially orchids. In plants employing sexual mimicry, flowers mimic mating signals of their pollinator insects. These insects are attracted and pollinate the flowers through pseudocopulations or other sexual behaviors performed on the flower.

== Social systems ==
Sexual mimicry can play a role in the development of a species' social system. Perhaps the most extreme example of this can be seen in the spotted hyena, Crocuta crocuta. Female hyenas of all ages possess pseudomasculinized genitalia, including a pseudopenis formed from the clitoris, and a false scrotum formed from the labia. These characteristics likely initially evolved to reduce rates of intrasex aggression received by cub and juvenile females from adult females. However, the trait has evolved beyond its initial use to become highly relevant to spotted hyena communication. Subordinate hyenas will greet dominant individuals by erecting their penis or pseudopenis and allowing the dominant individual to lick it. This likely initially evolved as a means of discerning the sex of the subordinate individual, as the pseudopenis less closely resembles a genuine penis when erect, and tasting the area could allow for the detection of sex specific hormone concentrations. However, this behaviour continues to be engaged in by adult, parous females which no longer convincingly resemble males, visually or olifactorily.

== Mating systems ==
In the spotted hyenas, the only way for the males to mate with the females is if they have the female's full cooperation because of the female's peniform clitoris. An increase in the male's status gave them more access to dominant females in the clan. Non-dominant females are observed copulating more often with lower-ranking males. It is costly for female hyenas to give birth through their long peniform clitoris. The umbilical cord is 12–18 cm long, while the journey from the uterus to the clitoris end is 40 cm. The umbilical cord often breaks before the cub emerges, leading to death by anoxia for many young. This journey is not only harmful for the cubs, but also for the mother. The tissue of the clitoris will sometimes rip open when giving birth for the first time which can be fatal to the mother.

Sexual mimicry is also used as a mate-guarding strategy by some species. Mate-guarding is a process in which a member of a species prevents another member of the same species from mating with their partner. Mate-guarding is seen in Cotesia rubecula, a parasitic wasp from the family Braconidae whose mating system is polygynous. Males are attracted to females through pheromones and they induce females to mate through vibrations, to which the female responds by assuming a specific position. When a male who has copulated with a female sees another male trying to court her, he will often adopt the female receptive position. Post-copulatory female mimicry by the male offers an advantage by acting as a mate-guarding mechanism. If a second male arrives soon enough after the female copulates with the first male, the second male may be able to induce a second copulation which will compete with the first one. However, if the first male who copulated with her mimics the female, it distracts the second male long enough that the female becomes unreceptive.

== Sneaky copulation ==
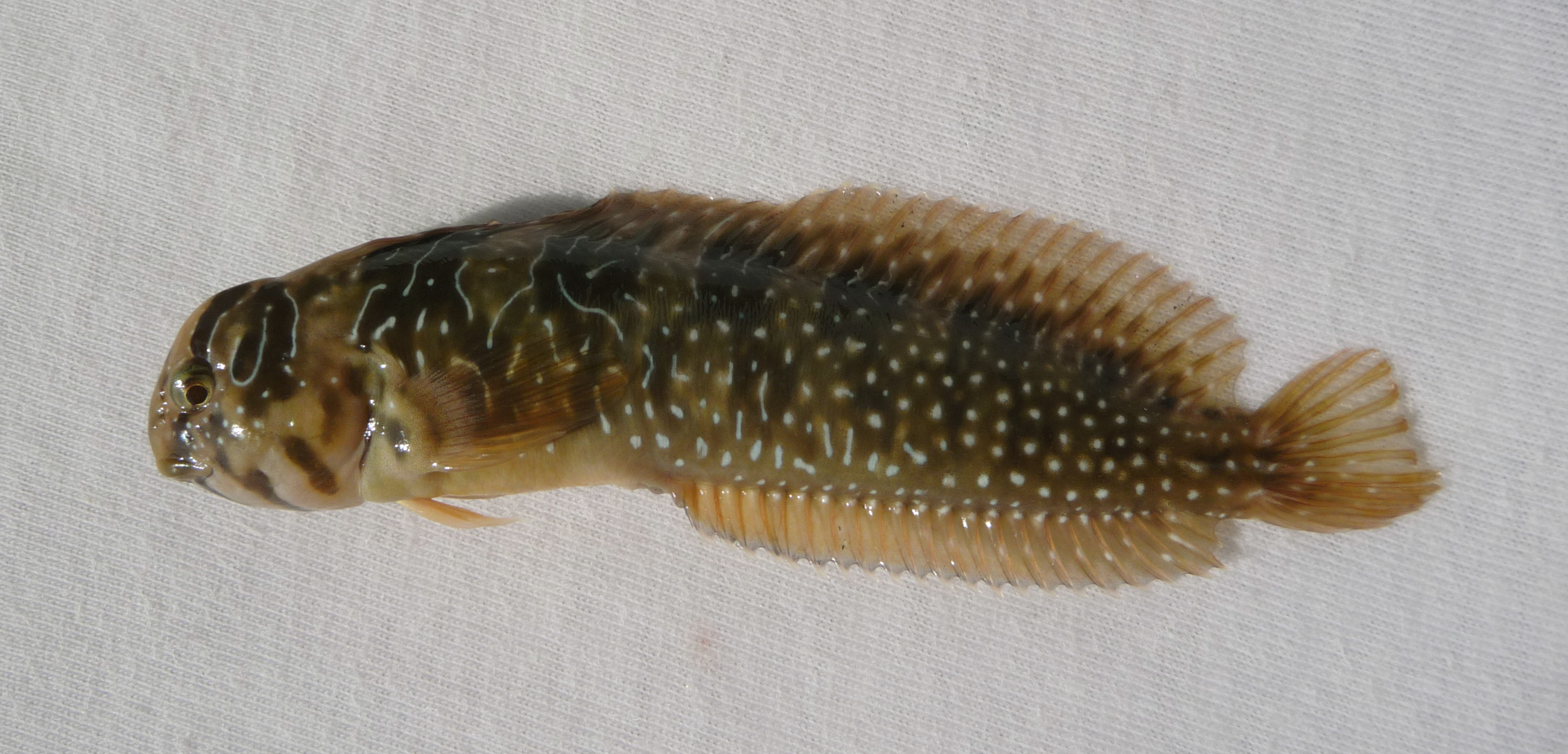
Salaria pavo female

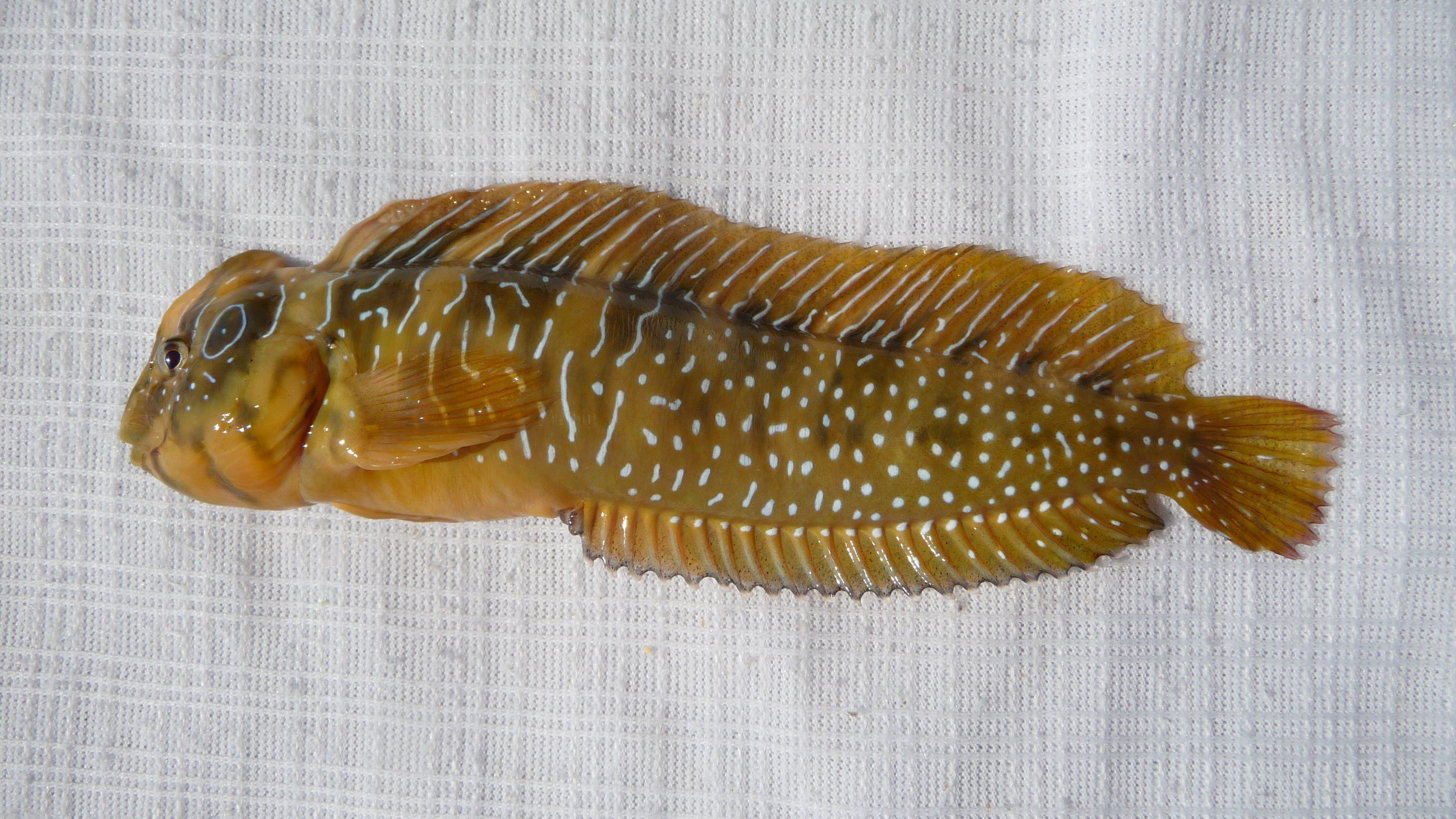
Salaria pavo male

Sneaky copulation is a strategy used by many aquatic organisms who portray sexual mimicry. Several studies have found that small male fish will look and behave like the female of their species in order to gain access to female territory and copulate with them. In the fish family Blenniidae, the female Salaria pavo will show a specific colour pattern and movement when they want to approach a male and copulate with him. The male guards a territory, and when the female lays her eggs, the parental male protects that territory until the eggs hatch. A second type of males, the sneaker males, is parasitic and resembles the female bleniid fish in their small size, colour, and movement patterns. This allows them to intrude into the nest guarded by the parental males. Sneaker males approach the nests with the same colour patterns and movements that the females hold. Most cases of sneaker males are seen when there is a female already inside the nest although sometimes the sneaker fish enters the nest alongside a female. This species of fish releases the sperm before the female releases her eggs into the water making it possible for the sneaker fish to fertilize an egg, even if the female is not present in the nest.

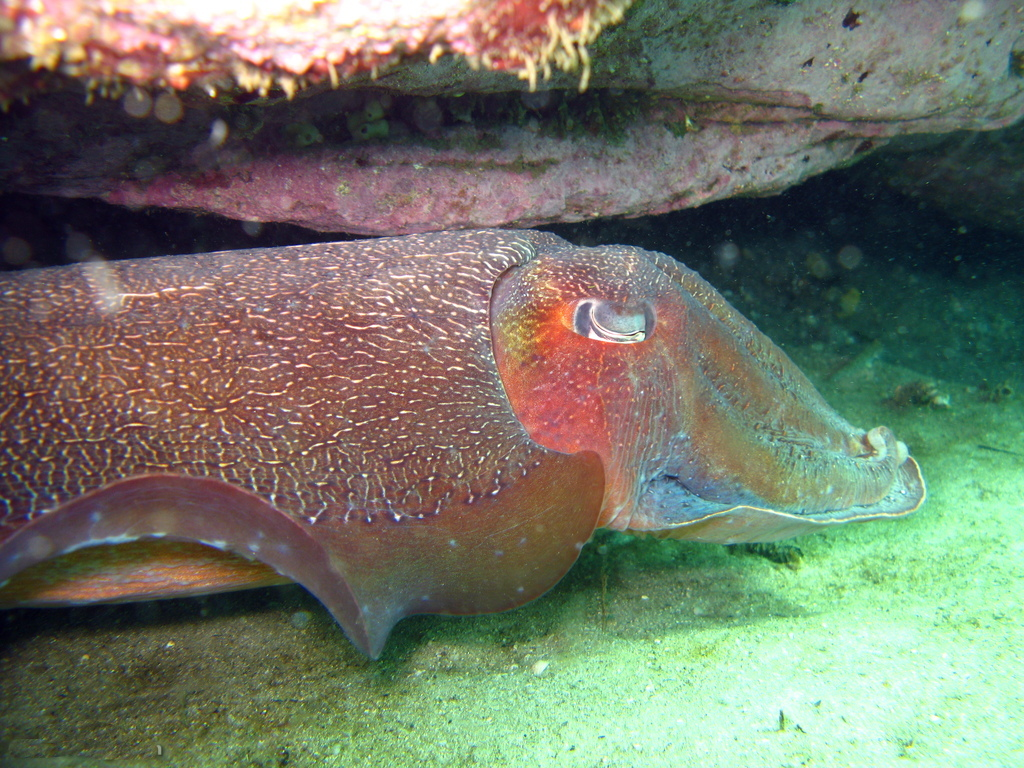
Sepia apama

In the Sepiina family, the giant cuttlefish, Sepia apama, have some males that are large and able to guard a female's nest while other males are small and resemble females in order to sneak in copulations. In the giant cuttlefish, the male courts the female and transfers its sperm to a pouch below the female's beak. During this process, the female displays a body pattern of black splotches on a white background. Once the eggs are laid, the male guards the nest from any possible suitors and opponents. A ‘second female’ is sometimes seen during male-female interaction in close proximity to the couple. This female-looking cuttlefish has the same black blotches as a real female. If the male leaves to fight other males, this individual approaches the female and copulates with her, usually with success. However, in the absence of rivals, these 'mimicking female' males display the phenotype of a mature male.

== Sexual mimicry against aggression ==
A similar phenomenon to the sneaker fish males is observed in the dark-edged splitfin, Girardinichthys multiradiatus. The juveniles resemble the pregnant females in the species by having a dark spot near the vent. In this case, however, the mimicking males have the capability to resemble the females or become a morphologically mature male throughout most of their adult life. This dark spot allows the female-looking males to escape aggression from more dominant males, as well as reducing the chance of having a female nearby flee due to persisting courting males. The mature males do not attack the subordinate fish and the subordinate fish decides when to initiate the fights, which gives it an advantage as the mature male is not expecting this. The dark spot also permits access of subordinate males to females, a characteristic that is advantageous because females' eggs can only be fertilized during a five-day fertilizing window.

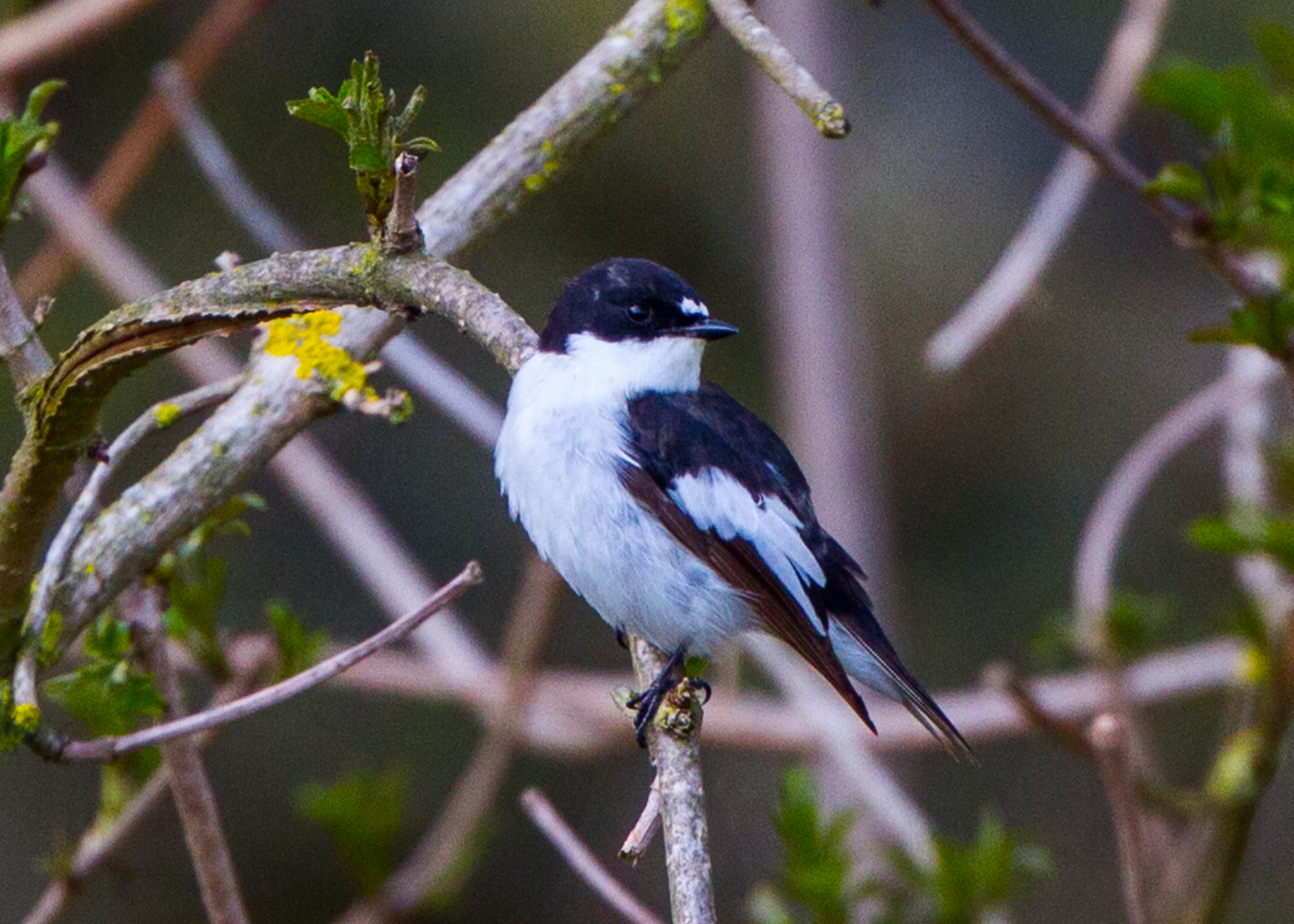
Male Ficedula hypoleuca

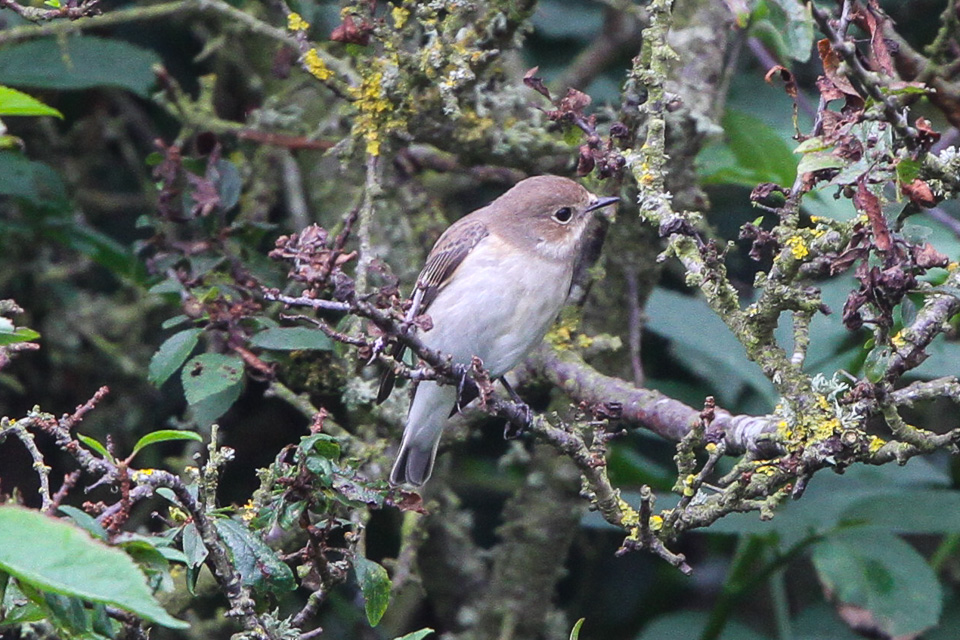
Female/juvenile Ficedula hypoleuca

Sexual mimicry to avoid aggression is also seen in birds. In some bird species, males have a female-like plumage colour during their second year of life (SY males). These SY males are sexually mature and able to breed, but their morphology differs greatly from the older, after second year (ASY) males. Various studies have looked into this delayed plumage maturation (DPM) and found that the DPM in SY males reduces aggression from ASY males. Female mimicry in birds was first found in European pied flycatcher, Ficedula hypoleuca. When a dull-coloured male is in the area, mature males reduce their aggressiveness and behave as if the intruder is a female. The dull plumage is seen mostly in younger males, likely due to being born later in the previous spring. The resemblance to females benefit these young males when trying to occupy a territory with many males already present because the young males can gain information and access to a territory that would not be accessible to them otherwise.

There is a big cost to not looking like a male when it comes to defending a territory or attracting a mate. Females show aggression against dull-coloured males, making it harder for them to mate. However, DPM has some benefits: as mentioned above, it reduces aggression from older males. As well, these female-looking birds are able to get access to territories, mates, and food that may be not be available to them otherwise. Another benefit is that DPM provides SY birds with a longer lifespan; because they do not have to compete with other males, their mortality rate is lower. This advantage, however, only benefits individuals of species that have a longer potential lifespan and, therefore, DPM would not benefit a short-lived species. This is known as the breeding threshold hypothesis, and states that SY males should only delay breeding if there is a large mortality difference between the SY males who attempt to breed and the ones who do not.

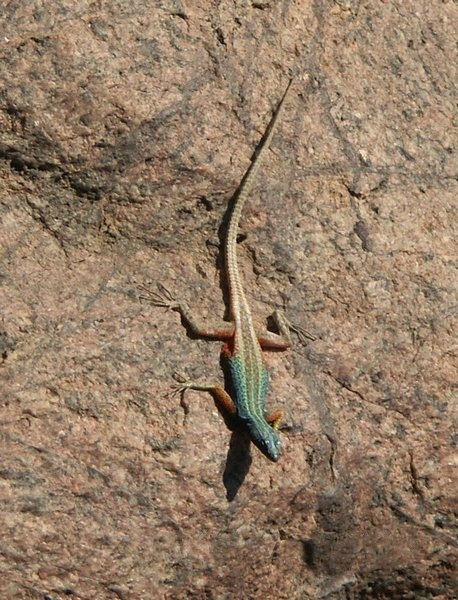
Platysaurus broadleyi

Most studies addressed DPM as a type of sexual mimicry, which is done through deception: male ASY birds should not be able to tell females or SY males apart. However, Muheter et al. (1997) found that territorial males perceive the dull-coloured males as males but they show less aggression because their dull-coloured plumage promotes low competitive ability. They referred to this as honest signalling and not sexual mimicry.

Another example of sexual mimicry occurs in Broadley's Flat Lizard, Platysaurus broadleyi, where some males mimic females. Flat lizard males tend to be territorial and aggressive towards other males. Therefore, it is beneficial for some males to mimic females in order to avoid aggressive encounters and move freely through the male's territory, looking for mates. There are two types of males in this population; she-males, who mimic females, and he-males, who look like males. The she-males can visually fool the he-males into believing that they are female due to their female morphology. However, the she-males cannot fool the he-males through scent, as he-males can detect the difference. Therefore, the most successful she-males are those who avoid close contact with other males, thereby reducing the chances of detection through chemical signals.

== Molecular control over sexual mimicry ==
In a lekking shorebird species, the ruff, or Philomachus pugnax, there are three distinct male morphs: independent males, the primary, dark-feathered morph, which establishes and aggressively defends a lekking territory, satellite males, a light-feathered morph which does not defend its own territory but which seeks prominent independent males to display alongside, and faeder males, which lack the typical male breeding plumage, instead more closely resembling females, possess a smaller body size, intermediate between a typical male and female, and which do not consistently occupy a single territory, but move freely between different independent male territories, perhaps owing to their female-like plumage, and engage in sneak copulations with females.

When testosterone is administered to reeves (female ruffs), male courtship behaviour and male feather colouration are expressed in the reeves. Testosterone, in this case, expresses sex-limited characteristics by acting on the single autosomal gene.

Biology Illustration Animals Insects Drosophila melanogaster

A different example is seen in mature female fruit flies, Drosophila melanogaster, who are very attractive but their level of attractiveness decreases by half or more after three minutes of mating. Males release a compound, 7-tricosene, into the female during courtship that lowers female attractiveness. However, the researcher found that the females release this compound as well, six hours after mating. This compound lowers the female's levels of attractiveness both times, when the male is courting her and during mating. This way, the female mimics the male and with this compound, she lowers her levels of attractiveness.

== Genetic control over sexual mimicry ==
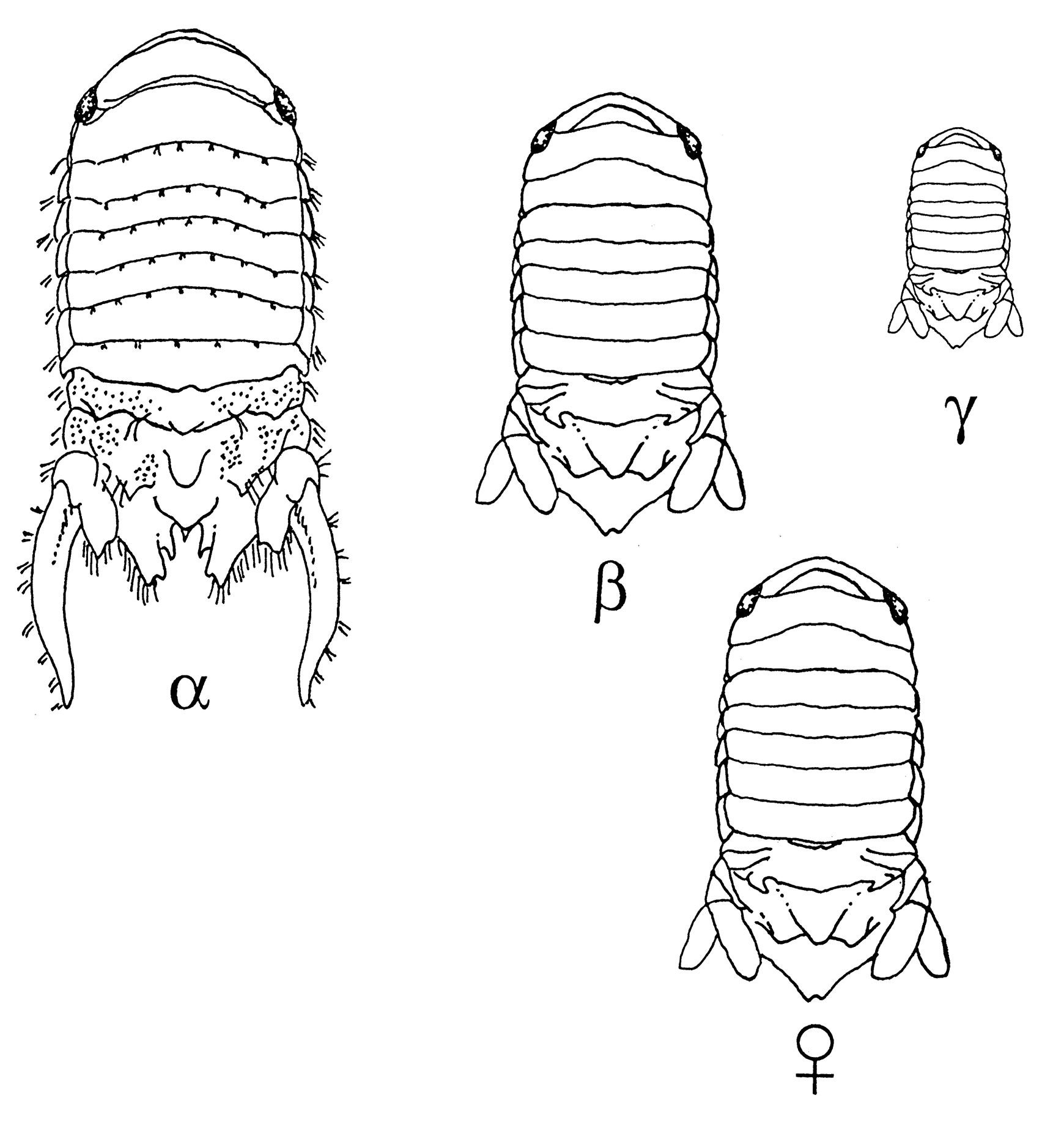
Paracerceis sculpta (Marine isopod)

Some organisms' sexual mimicry is genetically determined by specific alleles. In the marine isopod, Paracerceis sculpta, there are three different male morphologies: the alpha male is the largest morph, it matures last, and it is the one who gets privileged access to the females. The beta male is of intermediate size, and it mimics the female to get access to females. Last, the gamma male is the smallest morph and it invades harems, where females go to mate with alpha males, for mating opportunities. This morphology is associated with a single autosomal gene and three different alleles. Beta is the most dominant allele, followed by gamma, which is followed by alpha. Selection on these alleles acts according to the Hardy-Weinberg equilibrium and mating success is equivalent among all three morphs.

The alpha males, who are homozygous for the alpha allele, mate with many females in a harem. The females prefer to aggregate with other females in the harem, which gives the alpha male a bigger selection of mating partners. Shuster (1992) looked at the behaviour and relationship of each morph with respect to the harem and found that beta and gamma males could locate harems that have sexually receptive females. They were also able to differentiate between a harem with a sexually receptive female, i.e. one that is able to mate, and a non-sexually receptive female, i.e. one that has already deposited the embryo into her pouch and can no longer mate. While it is still unclear how the beta males do this or how their mating strategies work, they are not harassed by alpha males due to their mimicry of females: the beta males can attract other females into the harem since females like to go where other females are, and this provides the alpha males with more mates.

Another order of organisms whose sexual mimicry is influenced by their DNA is the Odonata, carnivorous insects known as dragonflies and damselflies. In these species, it is the female who sometimes mimics the male. Within a species, groups of females will differ in colour: one group mimics the males' colour and they are known as androchromes. Other groups will have their own female colouration and they are known as gynochromes. In Ischnura elegans, androchromes comprise 6-30% of the female population and their colour is usually blue, like the males; in some populations, androchromes are larger in size than gynochromes. This polymorphism is controlled by an autosomal allele and some studies have looked at the reason for the polymorphism's maintenance.

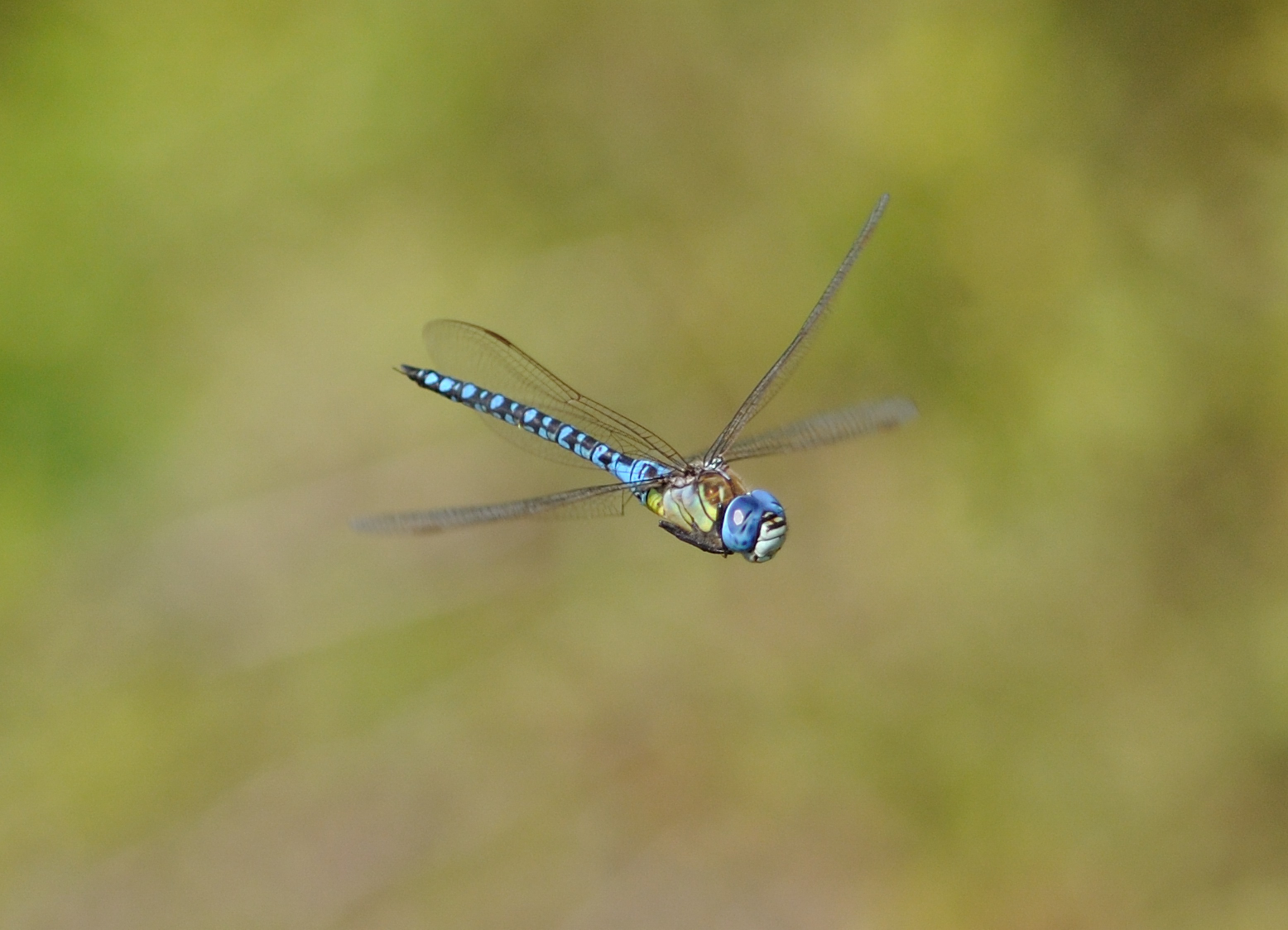
Aeshna affinis Male

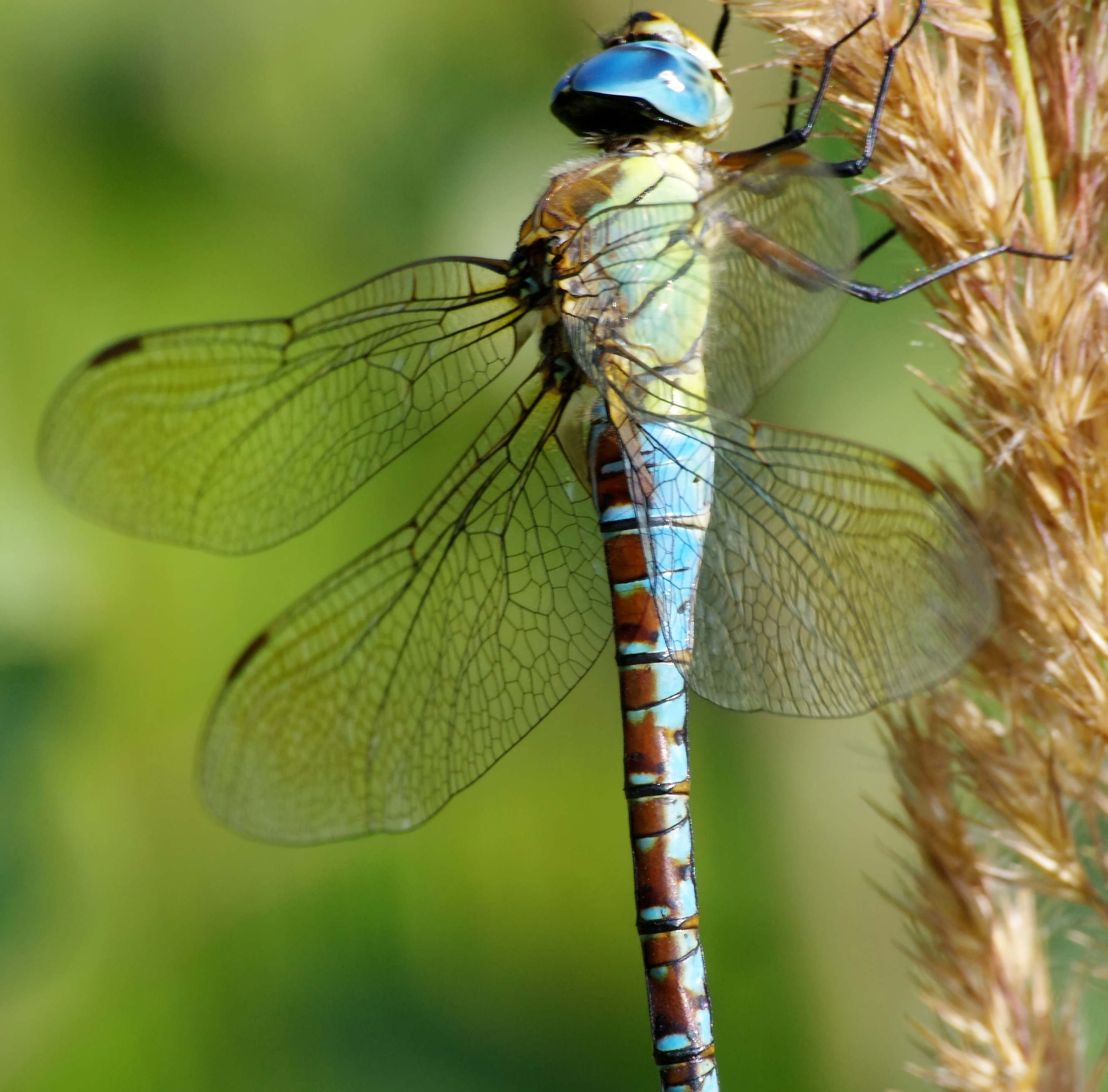
Aeshna affinis Female Androchrome

The most likely theory for the maintenance of the polymorphism in Odonata is the density dependence theory that states that at a high male density, the androchromes are not bothered by the males and their existence is not threatened by male harassment. This hypothesis also assumes that males cannot distinguish between androchromes and other males. This advantage, however, is counteracted with the fact that they will not get a lot of mating opportunities (if any) and their reproduction is limited. This theory is the most likely explanation for the maintenance of polymorphism, since studies have shown that there is an advantage for androchromes in high male-density populations.

In the swordtail fish Xiphophorus birchmanni, 40% of males develop a "false gravid spot," a trait that allows males to mimic the "pregnancy spot" found in females. The false gravid spot is caused by structural variation which up-regulates expression of the nearby gene kit-ligand. Males with the spot experience reduced aggression from other males; however, they are disdained by females but receive more attention from males.

== Self-control over sexual mimicry ==
While, as seen before, most organisms which portray sexual mimicry are born with this morphology/behaviour, this is not always the case. The giant cuttlefish, Sepia apama, mentioned above in the section “sneaky copulation”, is born with the capacity to choose whether to change its morphology to look like a female or a mature male. When no competition is seen nearby, the cuttlefish will look like a mature male and mate with the female. However, when a mature male and a female are copulating, the giant cuttlefish will resemble a female and stay at a close distance of the couple, hoping for a chance to mate with the female if the mature male leaves to fight other males. Another example of an organism that has the capability to remain small and look like a female, or become a morphologically mature male, is the dark-edged splitfin, Girardinichthys multiradiatus. The purpose for their female mimicry was seen before, in the “sexual mimicry against aggression” section where the female-looking males will escape aggression from dominant males and avoid females fleeing their company due to persisting courting males.

== Interspecific deceptive mimicry ==
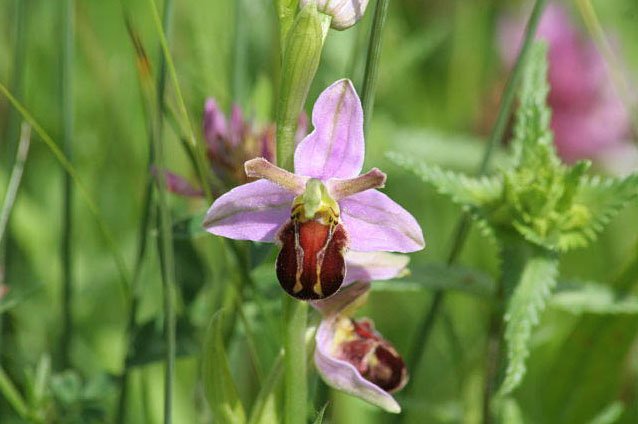
Bee Orchid

Interspecific sexual mimicry can also occur in some plant species. The most common example of this is known as sexually deceptive pollination and is found among some orchids. The orchid mimics its pollinator's females, usually hymenopterans such as wasps and bees, attracting the males to the flower. Orchid flowers mimic the sex pheromones and to some degree the visual appearance of the female insect of its pollinator species. The primacy of olfactory over visual cues has been demonstrated in many cases, such as in the European orchid genus Ophrys as well as many Australian sexually deceptive orchids. In few other cases, such as the South African daisy Gorteria diffusa, visual signals seem to be of primary importance. Visual signals also enhance the attractiveness of the flowers of some Ophrys species to their pollinators. Some male scoliid wasps such as Campsoscolia ciliata are more attracted to the Ophrys flowers' odours than to the odours of the female wasps, although they both attract the males with the same compounds. This is most likely a result of a higher amount of scent coming from the orchid flowers; female wasps tend to produce less scent to avoid attracting predators. Regardless of whether orchids use appearances, fragrances or both, they mimic the female pollinator for their own benefit.

== See also ==
- Fossa (animal)#External genitalia
- Pseudo-penis
- Sequential hermaphroditism
