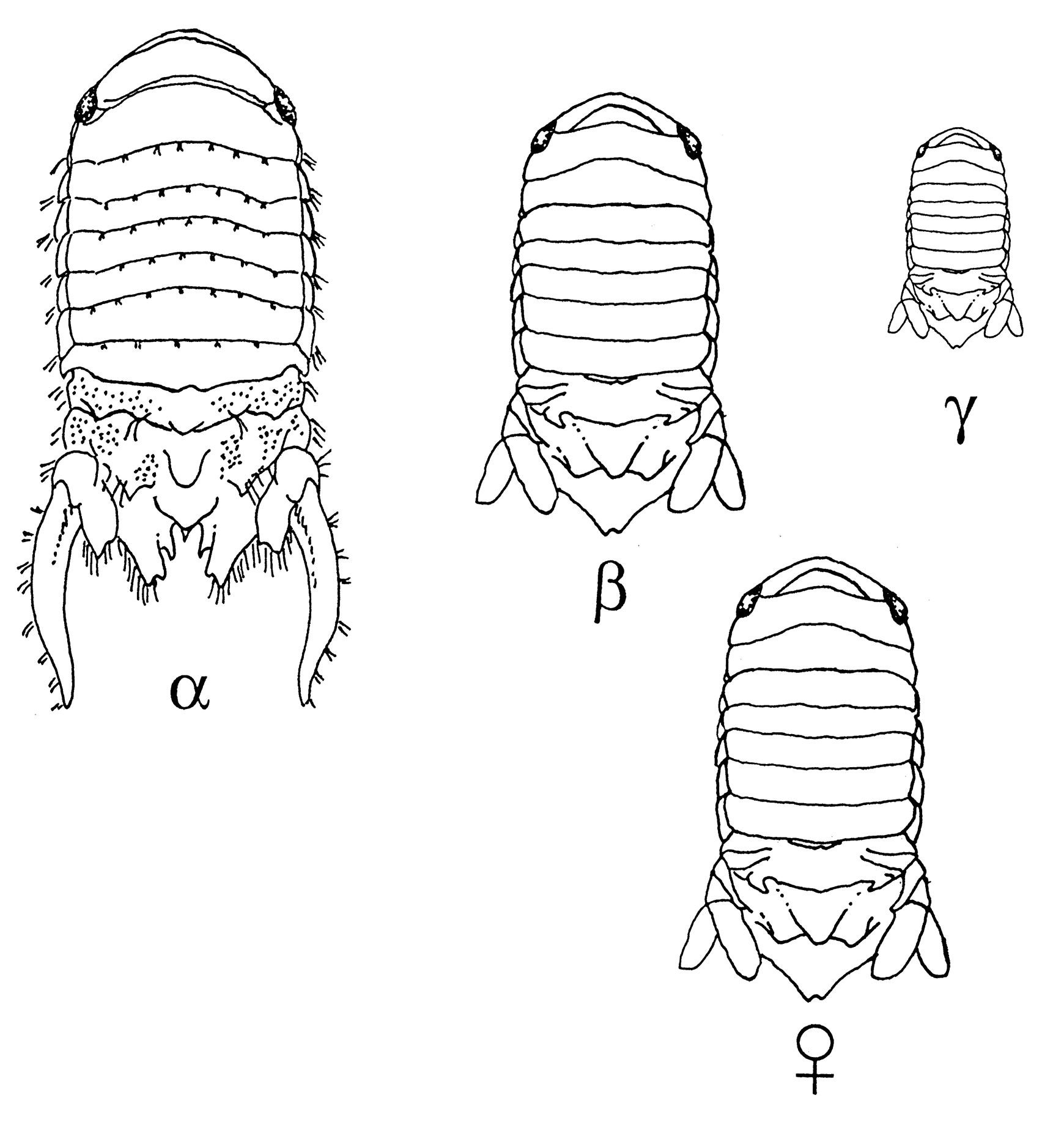

Scientific classification
- Kingdom: Animalia
- Phylum: Arthropoda
- Clade: Pancrustacea
- Class: Malacostraca
- Order: Isopoda
- Family: Sphaeromatidae
- Genus: Paracerceis
- Species: P. sculpta

Binomial name
- Paracerceis sculpta Holmes, 1904

= Paracerceis sculpta =

Species of crustacean

Paracerceis sculpta or sponge isopod is a species of marine isopod between 1.3 millimetres (0.05 in) and 10.3 mm (0.41 in) in length. The species lives mainly in the intertidal zone, and is native to the Northeast Pacific from Southern California to Mexico, but has since been introduced to many other countries. Adults are herbivorous and consume algae but juveniles are carnivorous and consume moulting females. They reproduce in sponges but do not feed near them.

== Reproduction ==
Their reproductive strategy is of interest, as both males and females are unusual among animals. Males are polymorphic and exist in 3 forms, α, β, and γ of different sizes. Of the three, α males are the largest and most dominant; they mate with multiple females in a harem. The β males mimic the females and therefore manage to mate with some of the females in an α male's harem. The γ form is much smaller and mimics the juvenile form, also allowing it to escape detection. Relatively speaking, the γ males invest the most energy in their testes, followed by the β males and the α males. Other species in which alternative reproductive strategies caused by a genetic polymorphism occur are the swordtail (Xiphophorus nigrensis), the tree lizard (Urosaurus ornatus), the ruff (Philomachus pugnax) and the side-blotched lizard (Uta stansburiana).

The α males guard a spongocoel into which females (as many as 19) enter to mate. Females brood their offspring internally within a brood pouch and use their bodies to provide nutrition to their developing young before they are released. Females only reproduce once, with larger females producing more eggs. Shortly before females become fertile, they can be cannibalistic. They then undergo a sexual moult, losing their mouthparts in the process. The eggs are fertilised inside the female, though how the sperm enter the female is unclear since the sperm of this, and other related species, are apparently immotile. The length of gestation depends on the temperature of the water – the cooler the water, the longer it takes. The female provides nutrition directly, her internal organs and muscles degrading throughout the gestation. This gives the juveniles a headstart, before they begin feeding on intertidal algae. The females die shortly after juveniles are released.

== Introductions ==
Paracerceis sculpta is thought to have been spread around the world by ships involved in international trade. The sponges they reproduce in grow on the hulls of ships and this allows Paracerceis sculpta to be transported easily. There is also a high potential for them to be spread through ballast water. Through these mechanisms Paracerceis sculpta has spread to Australia, Brazil, the Atlantic coast of Europe, Hawaii, Hong Kong, the Mediterranean and Japan. The wide range of water temperatures in its native range is thought to contribute to its ability to be spread by shipping.

== See also ==
- Side-blotched lizard: three male and two female show a diversity of behaviors associated with reproduction
