= Michael McDonald discography =

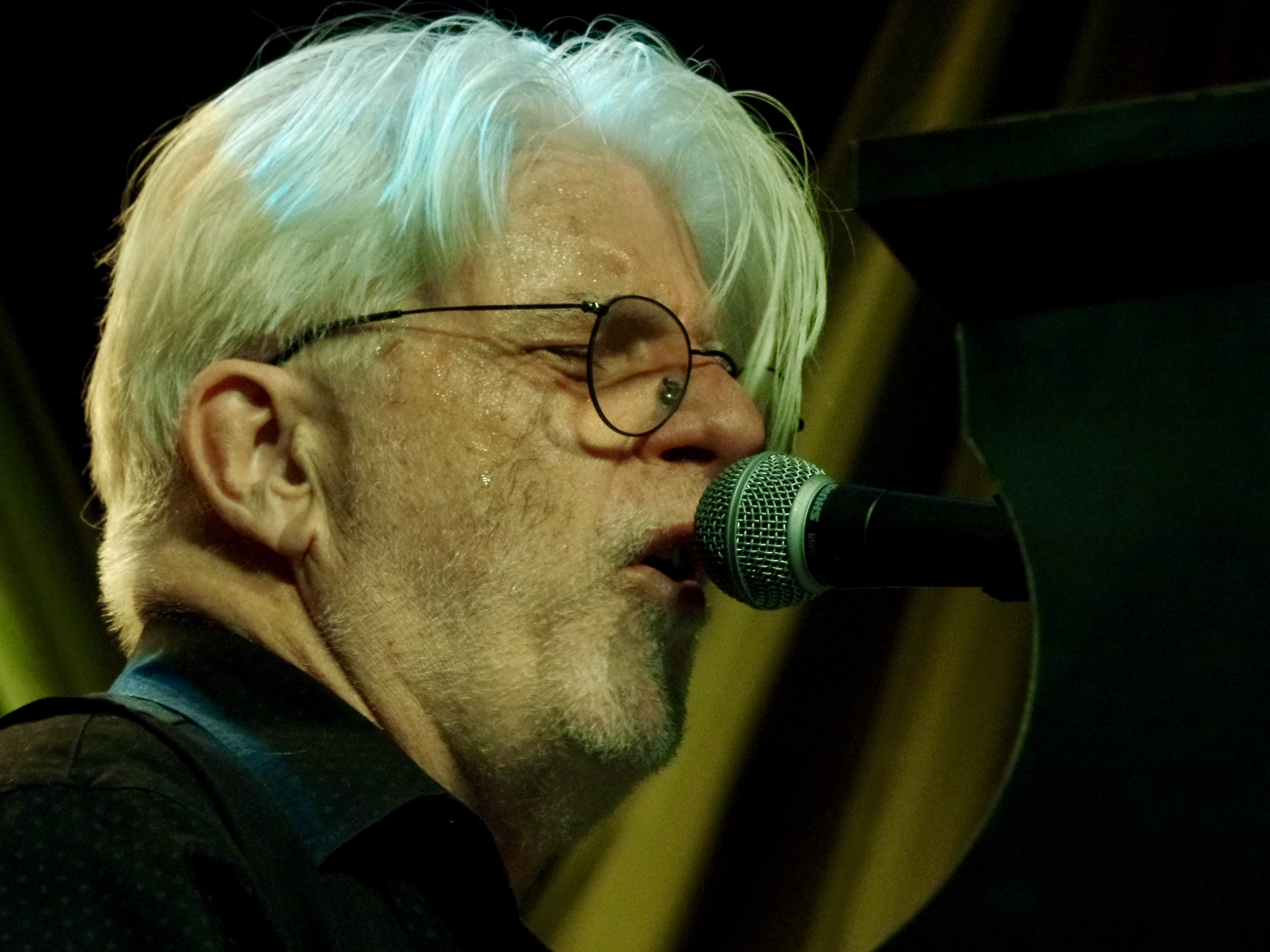
- McDonald performing live in 2019
- Studio albums: 11
- Live albums: 1
- Compilation albums: 7
- Singles: 50
- Music videos: 10

American singer-songwriter Michael McDonald has released 11 studio albums, one live album, seven compilation albums, 50 singles and 10 music videos.

== Albums ==
=== Studio albums ===
Title	Album details	Peak chart positions							Certifications
Title	Album details	US	US R&B	AUS	DEN	NLD	SWE	UK	Certifications
If That's What It Takes	Released: August 3, 1982; Label: Warner Bros.; Formats: LP, CD, cassette	6	10	41	—	—	—	—	RIAA: Gold
No Lookin' Back	Released: July 30, 1985; Label: Warner Bros.; Formats: LP, CD, cassette	45	—	—	—	—	26	—	
Take It to Heart	Released: May 15, 1990; Label: Reprise; Formats: LP, CD, cassette	110	—	—	56	29	—	35	
Blink of an Eye	Released: August 3, 1993; Label: Reprise; Formats: CD, cassette	—	—	—	74	42	—	—	
Blue Obsession	Released: March 28, 2000; Label: Ramp; Formats: CD	—	—	—	—	—	—	—	
In the Spirit: A Christmas Album	Released: 2001; Label: MCA Nashville; Formats: CD	—	—	—	—	—	—	—	
Motown	Released: June 24, 2003; Label: Motown, Universal; Formats: CD, cassette	14	17	—	25	95	58	29	RIAA: Platinum
Motown Two	Released: October 26, 2004; Label: Motown, Universal; Formats: LP, CD	9	8	—	8	—	56	29	RIAA: Gold
Through the Many Winters, A Christmas Album	Released: 2005; Label: Hallmark; Formats: CD	—	—	—	—	—	—	—	RIAA: Gold
Soul Speak	Released: March 4, 2008; Label: Universal Motown; Formats: CD	12	10	—	—	—	—	27	
Wide Open	Released: September 15, 2017; Label: Chonin, BMG; Formats: LP, CD	—	—	—	—	—	—	—	
"—" denotes items which were not released in that country or failed to chart.

=== Compilation albums ===
Year	Album	Chart positions		Certifications	Record label
Year	Album	US	UK	Certifications	Record label
1982	That Was Then – The Early Recordings of Michael McDonald *	—	—		Arista
1986	Sweet Freedom	—	6	BPI: Platinum	Warner Bros.
2000	The Voice of Michael McDonald	—	—	BPI: Silver	Warner Bros. / Rhino
2001	The Very Best of Michael McDonald	—	21	RIAA: Gold	Warner Bros. / Rhino
2004	The Best of Michael McDonald: The Christmas Collection	—	—		
2005	The Ultimate Collection	19	20	BPI: Silver	Warner Bros. / Rhino
2009	This Christmas	95	—		Razor & Tie
"—" denotes items which were not released in that country or failed to chart.

=== Live albums ===
Year	Album	Record label
2018	Live on Soundstage	Chain Records, BMG

== Singles ==
Year	Single	Chart positions							Album
Year	Single	US	US R&B	US AC	US Dan.	US Main Rock	US Jazz	UK	Album
1982	"I Keep Forgettin' (Every Time You're Near)"	4	7	8	—	—	—	43	If That's What It Takes
1982	"I Gotta Try"	44	—	28	—	—	—	—	If That's What It Takes
1985	"No Lookin' Back"	34	—	18	—	4	—	—	No Lookin' Back
1985	"Bad Times"	—	—	—	—	38	—	—	No Lookin' Back
1985	"Lost in the Parade"	—	—	40	—	—	—	—	No Lookin' Back
1986	"Sweet Freedom"	7	17	4	8	—	—	12	Running Scared (soundtrack) / Sweet Freedom
1987	"Our Love (Theme from No Mercy)"	—	—	—	—	—	—	—	Sweet Freedom
1990	"Take It to Heart"	98	—	4	—	—	—	—	Take It to Heart
1990	"Tear It Up"	—	—	27	—	—	—	—	Take It to Heart
1991	"All We Got"	—	88	—	9	—	—	—	Take It to Heart
1993	"I Stand for You"	114	—	21	—	—	—	—	Blink of an Eye
1993	"Hey Girl"	—	—	—	—	—	—	—	Blink of an Eye
1993	"For a Child"	—	—	—	—	—	—	—	Blink of an Eye
1994	"Matters of the Heart"	—	—	—	—	—	—	—	Blink of an Eye
2003	"I Heard It Through the Grapevine"	—	—	20	—	—	—	—	Motown
2004	"Ain't No Mountain High Enough"	111	—	5	—	—	—	—	Motown
2005	"Reach Out, I'll Be There"	—	—	12	—	—	—	—	Motown Two
2005	"Baby I Need Your Lovin'"	—	—	—	—	—	—	—	Motown Two
2005	"Stop, Look, Listen (To Your Heart)"	—	—	—	—	—	—	—	Motown Two
2005	"Deck the Halls/Jingle Bells"	—	—	19	—	—	—	—	Through the Many Winters
2008	"Walk On By"	—	—	—	—	—	—	—	Soul Speak
2008	"(Your Love Keeps Lifting Me) Higher and Higher"	—	—	9	—	—	—	—	Soul Speak
2008	"Love T.K.O."	—	92	—	—	—	—	—	Soul Speak
2008	"Enemy Within"	—	—	18	—	—	—	—	Soul Speak
2009	"Have Yourself a Merry Little Christmas"	—	—	—	—	—	—	—	This Christmas
2017	"Find It in Your Heart"	—	—	—	—	—	22	—	Wide Open
2022	"You Belong to Me" (w/ Buika)	—	—	—	—	—	—	—	Single only
2022	"Tears to Come"	—	—	—	—	—	—	—	Single only
"—" denotes the single was not released or didn't chart.

=== Guest singles ===
Year	Single	Chart positions					Certifications	Album
Year	Single	US	US R&B	US AC	US Cou.	UK	Certifications	Album
1975	"Bad Sneakers" (w/ Steely Dan)	—	—	—	—	—		Katy Lied
1979	"This Is It" (w/ Kenny Loggins)	11	19	17	—	—		Keep the Fire
1979	"Please Don't Leave" (w/ Lauren Wood)	24		5	—	—		Lauren Wood
1980	"Let Me Go, Love" (w/ Nicolette Larson)	35	96	9	—	—		In the Nick of Time
1980	"Ride Like the Wind" (w/ Christopher Cross)	2	—	24	—	69	BPI: Silver	Christopher Cross
1983	"All Right" (w/ Christopher Cross)	12	—	3	—	51		Another Page
1983	"No Time for Talk" (w/ Christopher Cross)	33	—	—	—	—		Another Page
1983	"Yah Mo B There" (w/ James Ingram)	19	5	10	—	44		It's Your Night
1985	"Yah Mo B There" (w/ James Ingram) [UK re-release]	—	—	—	—	12		It's Your Night
1986	"On My Own" (w/ Patti LaBelle)	1	1	2	—	2	BPI: Silver	Winner in You
1986	"I Just Can't Let Go" (w/ David Pack & James Ingram)	—	—	13	—	—		The Voice of Michael McDonald
1987	"Love Has No Color" (w/ The Winans)	—	—	—	—	—		Decision
1992	"Ever Changing Times" (w/ Aretha Franklin)	—	19	11	—	—		What You See Is What You Sweat
1992	"Time to Be Lovers" (w/ Chaka Khan)	—	—	—	—	—		Beverly Hills 90210 - The Soundtrack
1998	"One Heart at a Time" (w/ Garth Brooks, Billy Dean, Faith Hill, Olivia Newton-John, Neal McCoy, Victoria Shaw, and Bryan White)	56	—	—	69	—		Single only
1999	"Among the Missing" (w/ Kathy Mattea)	—	—	—	73	—		Single only
1999	"Eyes of a Child"	—	—	—	—	—		South Park: Bigger, Longer and Uncut
2002	"Sweet Freedom" (w/ Safri Duo)	—	—	—	—	54		— Episode II
2005	"Heart of America" (w/ Wynonna Judd, Eric Benét and Terry Dexter)	—	—	—	—	—		Hurricane Relief: Come Together Now
2006	"My Love's Leavin' " (w/ Fourplay)	—	—	—	—	—		X
2009	"While You Wait for the Others" (w/ Grizzly Bear)	—	—	—	—	—		Single only
2011	"Some Children" (w/ Holy Ghost!)	—	—	—	—	—		Holy Ghost!
2017	"Show You The Way" (w/ Thundercat and Kenny Loggins)	—	—	—	—	—		Drunk
2017	"When We Were Young" (w/ Jo Harman)	—	—	—	—	—		People We Become
2023	"Wherever I Go" (w/ Jacob Collier and Lawrence)	—	—	—	—	—		Djesse Vol. 4
"—" denotes the single was not released or didn't chart.

== Music videos ==
Year	Video
1982	"I Keep Forgettin'"
1982	"I Gotta Try'"
1985	"Lost in the Parade'"
1985	"No Lookin Back"
1986	"Sweet Freedom" (with Billy Crystal and Gregory Hines)
1986	"On My Own" (with Patti LaBelle)
1986	"I'll Be Over You" (with Toto)
1987	"Love Has No Color" (with Winans)
1998	"One Heart at a Time" (with Olivia Newton-John, Bryan White, Neal McCoy, Faith Hill, Victoria Shaw, Billy Dean and Garth Brooks)
2000	"Among the Missing" (with Kathy Mattea)
