= Sweet Freedom (Michael McDonald album) =

Compilation album by Michael McDonald
- Released: 1986
- Genre: Pop
- Label: Warner Bros.
- Producers: Michael McDonald; Rod Temperton; Dick Rudolph; Bruce Swedien; Ted Templeman; Quincy Jones; Lenny Waronker; Burt Bacharach; Carole Bayer Sager

Michael McDonald chronology
No Lookin' Back (1985)	Sweet Freedom (1986)	Take It to Heart (1990)

Professional ratings
Review scores
Source	Rating
AllMusic	4.5/5 stars

Sweet Freedom (also known as Sweet Freedom – The Best of Michael McDonald in some countries) is a compilation album by American singer and songwriter Michael McDonald, released in 1986 by Warner Bros. Records.

== Content ==
The compilation includes singles and album tracks from Michael McDonald's first two solo studio albums, If That's What It Takes (1982) and No Lookin' Back (1985), along with duets with James Ingram ("Yah Mo B There"), Patti LaBelle ("On My Own") and one song from when McDonald was lead singer of the rock band The Doobie Brothers ("What a Fool Believes"). The album's title track, "Sweet Freedom", was a newly recorded song and featured on the soundtrack to the 1986 film Running Scared.

== Commercial performance ==
Sweet Freedom reached No. 6 in the UK Albums Chart and is McDonald's most successful album in the UK.

== Track listing ==
Side A

No.	Title	Writer(s)	Length
1.	"Sweet Freedom"	Rod Temperton	4:04
2.	"(I'll Be Your) Angel"	Michael McDonald; Chuck Sabatino	3:48
3.	"Yah Mo B There" (with James Ingram)	McDonald; Temperton; Ingram; Quincy Jones	4:29
4.	"I Gotta Try"	McDonald; Kenny Loggins	3:49
5.	"I Keep Forgettin'"	McDonald; Ed Sanford; Jerry Leiber; Mike Stoller	3:39
6.	"Our Love" (Remix)	McDonald; David Pack	4:18

Side B

No.	Title	Writer(s)	Length
7.	"On My Own" (with Patti LaBelle)	Burt Bacharach; Carole Bayer Sager	4:39
8.	"No Looking Back"	McDonald; Loggins; Sanford	3:54
9.	"Any Foolish Thing"	McDonald; Sabatino	4:22
10.	"That's Why"	McDonald; Randy Goodrum	4:22
11.	"What a Fool Believes" (with The Doobie Brothers)	McDonald; Kenny Loggins	3:40
12.	"I Can Let Go Now"	McDonald	2:53

== Production ==
- Track 1 produced by Rod Temperton, Dick Rudolph and Bruce Swedien
- Tracks 2, 6, 8 & 9 produced by Michael McDonald and Ted Templeman; engineered and mixed by Ross Pallone
- Track 3 produced by Quincy Jones for Quincy Jones Productions
- Tracks 4, 5, 10 & 12 produced by Ted Templeman and Lenny Waronker
- Track 6 remixed by Humberto Gatica
- Track 7 produced and arranged by Burt Bacharach and Carole Bayer Sager; executive producer – Patti LaBelle
- Track 11 produced by Ted Templeman; engineered by Donn Landee
- Album remastered by Lee Herschberg

== Charts ==
Chart performance for Sweet Freedom
Chart (1986)	Peak position
UK Albums (Official Charts)	6

== Certifications ==
Region	Certification	Certified units/sales
United Kingdom (BPI)	Platinum	300,000^{^}
^{^} Shipments figures based on certification alone.
