= Motown (disambiguation) =

Motown is an American record label founded in 1959, as well as the type of soul music associated with it.

Motown can also refer to:

== Related to the Motown label ==
- de Passe Entertainment, a film and television production company known from 1968 to 2008 as Motown Productions
- Motown Software (also known as Motown Games), a mid-90s video game publisher

== Music ==
- Motown: The Musical, a 2013 jukebox musical
- Motown (album), a 2003 album by Michael McDonald
- Motown: A Journey Through Hitsville USA, a 2007 album by Boyz II Men

== Other uses ==
- A nickname for the city of Detroit
- Motown Motion Picture Studios, a movie studio
- FC Motown, an American soccer club based in Morristown, New Jersey, United States

== See also ==
- Motown Two, a 2004 follow-up album by Michael McDonald
- Motown Remixed, a 2005 compilation album
- "The Motown Song", a 1991 single by Rod Stewart
- Motown Museum, a museum in the former music studio known as Hitsville U.S.A.
