= Take It to Heart =

Studio album by Michael McDonald
- Released: May 15, 1990
- Recorded: 1989–1990
- Studios: A&M Studios (Hollywood); Can-Am Recorders (Tarzana); Smoketree Ranch (Chatsworth); One On One Studios (North Hollywood); Axis Studios (New York City); Circle Seven Recording (Pacific Palisades); Ocean Way Studios (Hollywood); John Tesh Studios (Santa Monica)
- Genres: Rock; blue-eyed soul; R&B
- Length: 53:43
- Label: Reprise
- Producers: Michael McDonald; Ted Templeman; Don Was; David Gamson; Gardner Cole

Michael McDonald chronology
Sweet Freedom (1986)	Take It to Heart (1990)	Blink of an Eye (1993)

Take It to Heart is the third solo studio album by American singer-songwriter Michael McDonald. It was released on May 15, 1990, on the label Reprise, five years after his previous studio album, No Lookin' Back.

== Background ==
McDonald originally recorded an album with himself on keyboards, Jeff Porcaro on drums, Abraham Laboriel on bass, and Michael Landau on guitar. This album was originally slated to be released in August 1989 and titled Lonely Talk. It also had a different track list, containing the song “Plain of Jars” (which was released as a B-side) and a cover of Stevie Wonder’s “Higher Ground” (which was later released in 2000 on the greatest hits album The Voice of Michael McDonald). Then, about 3 weeks prior to the album's original planned release date, the record label decided there were not enough potential singles. McDonald then worked with other songwriters and recorded “All We Got”, “Get the Word Started”, “Take It to Heart”, and “Tear It Up”, which replaced some of the songs from the original tracklist.

== Track listing ==
Side one
No.	Title	Writer(s)	Length
1.	"All We Got"	Michael McDonald; Peter Leinheiser	5:45
2.	"Get the Word Started"	McDonald; David Pack	5:40
3.	"Love Can Break Your Heart"	McDonald; Paul Carrack	4:54
4.	"Take It to Heart"	McDonald; Diane Warren	5:57
5.	"Tear It Up"	Gardner Cole; Seth Swirsky	4:25

Side two
No.	Title	Writer(s)	Length
6.	"Lonely Talk"	McDonald; Chuck Sabatino	4:40
7.	"Searchin' for Understanding"	McDonald; Darrell Brown	3:42
8.	"Homeboy"	McDonald; Ed Sanford	4:35
9.	"No Amount of Reason"	McDonald; George Hawkins Jr.	4:37
10.	"One Step Away"	Chris Thompson; Tom Whitlock	4:12
11.	"You Show Me"	McDonald; Harry Garfield	4:59
Total length:			53:26

== Personnel ==
=== Musicians ===
- Michael McDonald – lead vocals, backing vocals (1–7, 10), synthesizer programming and sequencing (1, 4, 10), keyboards (2, 6–9, 11)
- Peter Leinheiser – synthesizer programming and sequencing (1), guitars (1)
- Michael Hanna – keyboards (2), synthesizer programming and sequencing (4)
- Michael Mason – synthesizer programming and sequencing (4)
- Don Was – synthesizer programming and sequencing (4)
- John Tesh – synthesizer programming and sequencing (4)
- David Gamson – synthesizer programming and sequencing (5)
- Gardner Cole – synthesizer programming and sequencing (5)
- Bernie Chiaravalle – guitar (2, 4, 7, 11), Coral sitar (4)
- Michael Landau – guitar (3, 5–9, 11)
- Charles Frichtel – bass (2)
- Abraham Laboriel – bass (3, 6–9, 11), acoustic guitar (11)
- George Perilli – drums (2, 4)
- Jeff Porcaro – drums (3, 6–9, 11), percussion (6, 7, 9, 10, 11), African log drum (11)
- Debra Dobkin – congas (2)
- Paulinho da Costa – percussion (4)
- Terry McMillan – percussion (6, 7), backing vocals (6)
- Vince Denham – saxophone solo (2)
- Kirk Whalum – saxophone (3)
- Stan Getz – saxophone (11)
- Chuck Sabatino – backing vocals (1, 6)
- Brian McKnight – backing vocals (1)
- Sweet Pea Atkinson – backing vocals (2, 4, 5)
- Sir Harry Bowens – backing vocals (2, 4, 5)
- David Lasley – backing vocals (2, 4)
- Kathy Walker – backing vocals (2)
- Amy Holland – backing vocals (3)
- David Pack – backing vocals (5, 7)
- Maureen McDonald-Ferguson – backing vocals (7)
- Paul Riser – string arrangements (2, 4)

=== Technical ===
- Produced by Ted Templeman (1, 3, 6–11), Michael McDonald (1, 3, 6–11), Don Was (2, 4), David Gamson (5), and Gardner Cole (5)
- Engineered by Jeff Hendricksen, Ed Cherney, Ross Pallone, and Bob Schaper
- Remixing – Shep Pettibone (1)
- Additional engineers – Brian Schuble, Ed Goodreau, and Bob Schaper
- Assistant engineers – Scott Symington, Rob Jaczko, Michael Douglass, Toby Wright, John Jackson, Michael Tacci, Elaine Anderson, Calvin Loser, Michael Mason, Lori Fumar, and Eric Rudd
- Mastered by George Marino at Sterling Sound (New York City, New York)
- Production coordinator – Joan Parker
- Art direction – Martyn Atkins T&CP Associates
- Photography – Andy Earl
- Direction – Front Line Management

== Chart performance ==
Chart (1990)	Peak position
US Billboard 200	110
UK Albums (Official Charts)	35

== See also ==
- List of albums released in 1990
- Michael McDonald's discography
