= If That's What It Takes =

If That's What It Takes may refer to:

- "If That's What It Takes", an English version of the song "Pour que tu m'aimes encore" performed by Celine Dion from the album Falling into You
- "If That's What It Takes", a song by Bon Jovi from the 1995 album These Days
- If That's What It Takes (album), a 1982 album by Michael McDonald
