= No Lookin' Back =

Studio album by Michael McDonald
- Released: August 12, 1985
- Studios: Dilling Street Studio (Studio City); The Villa Studio (North Hollywood); Hollywood Sound (Hollywood)
- Genres: Blue-eyed soul; pop rock; post-disco
- Length: 37:09
- Label: Warner Bros.
- Producers: Michael McDonald; Ted Templeman

Michael McDonald chronology
If That's What It Takes (1982)	No Lookin' Back (1985)	Sweet Freedom (1986)

Singles from No Lookin' Back
- 1. "No Lookin' Back" Released: July 15, 1985; 2. "Bad Times" Released: 1985; 3. "Lost in the Parade" Released: November 1985

No Lookin' Back is the second solo studio album by American musician Michael McDonald, released on August 12, 1985, by Warner Bros. Records. It came three years after his debut studio album, If That's What It Takes, and was his last to be released by Warner Bros. For the first time, he co-produced and wrote or co-wrote all of the tracks. It features contributions from guitarists Joe Walsh (Eagles, James Gang), Robben Ford and David Pack from Ambrosia, Jeff Porcaro on drums (Toto, Steely Dan), plus the former Doobie Brothers members Willie Weeks on bass guitar, and Cornelius Bumpus providing horns, half of whom had also performed on If That's What It Takes.

On release, the album was received favorably by the majority of music critics and peaked at No. 45 on the US Billboard 200. Three singles were issued from No Lookin' Back: "No Lookin' Back", "Bad Times" and "Lost in the Parade". The album's first and leading single, "No Lookin' Back", was co-written by Kenny Loggins and was a commercial success, peaking at No. 4 on the Billboard Hot Mainstream Rock Tracks chart and No. 34 on Billboard Hot 100.

The album was re-released one year later in 1986. The re-released version changed around the track order and featured different album cover artwork, along with the inclusion of the hit single "Sweet Freedom" from the soundtrack of the Peter Hyams action comedy film Running Scared, as well as the remixed version of "Our Love", which served as the theme for the Richard Pearce neo-noir action thriller film No Mercy.

"(I Hang) On Your Every Word" was originally released in 1983 on On Your Every Word, the second studio album by Amy Holland, McDonald's wife – who he had married that year. McDonald produced, and performed on the album, co-writing four tracks, and some of the same collaborators on that album are on No Lookin' Back.

== Critical reception ==
Professional ratings
Review scores
Source	Rating
AllMusic	3/5 stars
Encyclopedia of Popular Music	3/5 stars
Music Week	3/3 stars
Rolling Stone	(unfavorable)

In a negative contemporary review for Rolling Stone, critic J. D. Considine wrote that "the bulk of this album is utter piffle. McDonald's inability to move beyond his vocal limitations suggests that he might be simply the musical equivalent of a character actor, doomed forever to those parts demanding his particular mannerisms. If so, he'd better pay more attention to how he's being cast", and in a more positive review, Music Week wrote "having stabled the horses, hung up the cowboy boots and watched the Doobie Brothers ride off into the horizon, McDonald has clearly been moving in more funkier circles of late. The impressive soul vocal, previewed to such advantage on the Doobies' "What a Fool Believes", re-surfaces in a manner not that dissimilar to Hall & Oates. US in feel, but in with a chance if a single takes off."

== Track listing ==
=== Original release ===
Side one
No.	Title	Writer(s)	Length
1.	"No Lookin' Back"	Michael McDonald; Kenny Loggins; Ed Sanford	3:55
2.	"Bad Times"	McDonald	4:21
3.	"(I'll Be Your) Angel"	McDonald; Chuck Sabatino	3:57
4.	"By Heart"	McDonald; Sabatino; David Pack	4:35

Side two
No.	Title	Writer(s)	Length
5.	"Any Foolish Thing"	McDonald; Sabatino	4:23
6.	"Our Love"	McDonald; Pack	4:32
7.	"(I Hang) On Your Every Word"	McDonald; Amy Holland	3:37
8.	"Lost in the Parade"	McDonald; Grady Walker	3:48
9.	"Don't Let Me Down"	McDonald	4:01
Total length:			37:09

=== 1986 Reissue ===
Side one
No.	Title	Writer(s)	Length
1.	"No Lookin' Back"	McDonald; Loggins; Sanford	3:55
2.	"Bad Times"	McDonald	4:21
3.	"(I'll Be Your) Angel"	McDonald; Sabatino	3:57
4.	"By Heart"	McDonald; Sabatino; Pack	4:35
5.	"Don't Let Me Down"	McDonald	4:01

Side two
No.	Title	Writer(s)	Length
6.	"Sweet Freedom"	Rod Temperton	4:05
7.	"Our Love" (Theme from No Mercy)	McDonald; Pack	4:14
8.	"(I Hang) On Your Every Word"	McDonald; Holland	3:37
9.	"Any Foolish Thing"	McDonald; Sabatino	4:23
10.	"Lost in the Parade"	McDonald; Walker	3:48
Total length:			41:14

== Personnel ==
Credits adapted from the album's liner notes.

Musicians (Original release)

- Michael McDonald – vocals, keyboards (1), synthesizer (2–9), B-3 organ (5, 7)
- Mike Hanna – synthesizer (2)
- Chuck Sabatino – synthesizer (3, 5), backing vocals (3, 5)
- Chris Pelonis – Emulator programming (3, 4, 7)
- Scott Plunkett – synthesizer horns (4), sequenced synthesizer (7)
- Brian Mann – synthesizer (6, 8)
- Randy Goodrum – synthesizer (9)
- David Pack – guitar (1, 2, 4, 7), synthesizer (4), rhythm guitar (9)
- Joe Walsh – slide guitar (2)
- Robben Ford – guitar (3), lead guitar (9)
- Willie Weeks – bass (1, 3–5, 8, 9)
- Nathan East – bass (2)
- Jeff Porcaro – drums (1–5, 7–9), cymbals (6)
- George Perilli – tom drum solo (1), drum programming (4)
- Staff Fieldhouse – Simmons toms (4), Simmons drums (8)
- Roger Nichols – drums (6)
- Paulinho da Costa – percussion (4, 6, 9)
- Cornelius Bumpus – tenor saxophone (3, 5)

Musicians (1986 Reissue)

- Michael McDonald – vocals, synthesizers (7)
- Wells Christie – Synclavier (6)
- Anthony Patler – keyboards (6)
- Greg Phillinganes – keyboards (6)
- Danny Sembello – keyboards (6)
- Rod Temperton – keyboards (6), arrangements (6)
- Brian Mann – synthesizers (7)
- Paul Jackson Jr. – guitar (6)
- Michael Thompson – guitar (6)
- Steve Lukather – guitar (7)
- Abraham Laboriel – bass (7)
- Jeff Porcaro – drums (7), percussion (7)
- Bobby LaKind – congas (7)
- David Boruff – saxophone (6)
- Larry Williams – saxophone (6), keyboards (6), synthesizers (6)
- Kim Hutchcroft – saxophone (6)
- Jerry Hey – trumpet (6)
- Chuck Findley – trumpet (6)
- Gary Grant – trumpet (6)
- Bill Reichenbach Jr. – trombone (6)
- Siedah Garrett – backing vocals (6)

=== Technical ===
- Produced by Michael McDonald and Ted Templeman
- Engineered and mixed by Ross Pallone
- Additional engineers – Lee Herschberg, Jim Pace, and Grady Walker
- Second engineer – Mike Wuellner
- Mastered by Howie Weinberg at Masterdisk (New York, NY)
- CD mastered by Lee Herschberg at Amigo Studios (Los Angeles, CA)
- Production coordinator – Joan Parker and Kathy Walker
- Art direction – Jeffrey Kent Ayeroff
- Design – Jeri McManus
- Front photography – Joel Levinson
- Back photography – Brian Aris
- Hair – Howard Barr
- Make-up – Deborah Howell
- Direction – Front Line Management

== Chart performance ==
Album

Chart (1985)	Peak position
Canada Top Albums/CDs (RPM)	69
Swedish Albums (Sverigetopplistan)	26
US Billboard 200	45

Singles

Year	Single	Chart	Position
1985	"No Lookin' Back"	Billboard Hot 100	34
1985	"No Lookin' Back"	Billboard Adult Contemporary	9
1985	"No Lookin' Back"	Billboard Mainstream Rock	4
1985	"Bad Times"	Billboard Mainstream Rock	38
1985	"Lost in the Parade"	Billboard Adult Contemporary	40

== See also ==
- List of albums released in 1985
- Michael McDonald's discography
