= The New York Rock and Soul Revue: Live at the Beacon =

1991 live album by Donald Fagen and others

Live album by Donald Fagen, Phoebe Snow, Michael McDonald, Boz Scaggs, Eddie Brigati, David Brigati and Charles Brown
- Released: October 29, 1991
- Recorded: March 1 and 2, 1991
- Venues: Beacon Theatre, New York City
- Genres: Rock, soul
- Length: 66:46
- Label: Giant
- Producers: Donald Fagen, Elliot Scheiner

The New York Rock and Soul Revue: Live at the Beacon is a live album which documented the New York Rock and Soul Revue. It was recorded on March 1 and 2, 1991, at the Beacon Theatre in New York City, a favorite venue of organizer Donald Fagen. The performances featured Fagen and included Phoebe Snow, Michael McDonald, Boz Scaggs, Eddie Brigati, David Brigati and Charles Brown. Walter Becker, Fagen's bandmate from Steely Dan, who had not recorded with Fagen since 1980's Gaucho (album), played together on the Steely Dan number "Chain Lightning." Selections on the album included a number of songs which were originally written and recorded by members of the revue, as well as other songs. The album was released by Giant Records.

== Reception ==
Professional ratings
Review scores
Source	Rating
AllMusic	2.5/5 stars

In his Allmusic review, William Ruhlman wrote "Of course, it would have been better to have been there, but this makes an entertaining souvenir."

== Track listing ==
No.	Title	Writer(s)	Performer	Length
1.	"Intro"		Tom Schiller	:52
2.	"Madison Time"	Ray Bryant, Eddie Morrison	Donald Fagen	4:18
3.	"Knock on Wood"	Steve Cropper, Eddie Floyd	Michael McDonald and Phoebe Snow	3:55
4.	"Green Flower Street"	Donald Fagen	Donald Fagen	4:39
5.	"Shakey Ground"	Jeffrey Bowen, Al Boyd, Eddie Hazel	Phoebe Snow	3:40
6.	"At Last"	Mack Gordon, Harry Warren	Phoebe Snow	5:31
7.	"Lonely Teardrops"	Berry Gordy, Roquel Billy Davis, Gwendolyn Gordy	Michael McDonald	5:25
8.	"Drowning in the Sea of Love"	Kenny Gamble, Leon Huff	Boz Scaggs	5:29
9.	"Driftin' Blues"	Charles Brown	Charles Brown	4:08
10.	"Chain Lightning"	Walter Becker, Donald Fagen	Donald Fagen, Phoebe Snow, and Charles Brown	6:28
11.	"Groovin'"	Felix Cavaliere, Eddie Brigati	Eddie and David Brigati	4:24
12.	"Minute by Minute"	Michael McDonald, Lester Abrams	Michael McDonald	6:16
13.	"People Got to Be Free"	Felix Cavaliere, Eddie Brigati	Donald Fagen, Phoebe Snow, Michael McDonald, Boz Scaggs, Eddie and David Brigati, and Charles Brown	5:18
14.	"Pretzel Logic"	Walter Becker, Donald Fagen	Donald Fagen and Michael McDonald	4:58
15.	"Madison Reprise"		Donald Fagen	1:08

== Personnel ==
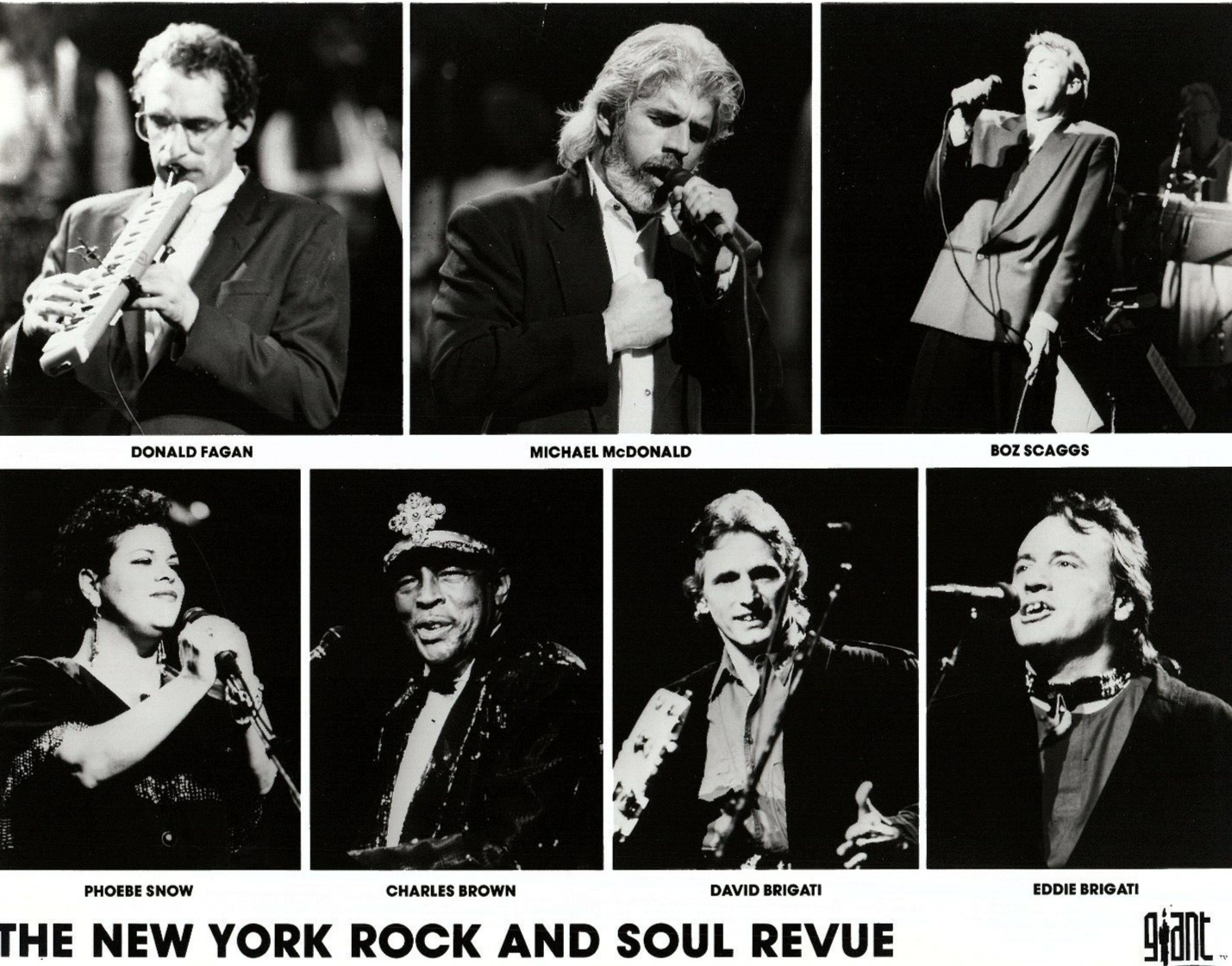
1991 promotional image of the band

- Donald Fagen – vocals, acoustic piano, Fender Rhodes, melodica (4, 11)
- Charles Brown – vocals, acoustic piano
- Michael McDonald – vocals, Yamaha DX7
- Walter Becker - guitar (10)
- Jeff Young – keyboards, organ solo (3)
- Danny Caron – guitar
- Jimmy Vivino – guitar
- Larry DeBari – guitar (5)
- Drew Zingg – guitar (8, 10, 12)
- Lincoln Schleifer – electric bass, acoustic bass
- Dennis McDermott – drums
- Philip Hamilton – percussion, backing vocals
- David Brigati – percussion, vocals, birdcalls (11)
- Eddie Brigati – percussion, vocals
- Cornelius Bumpus – tenor saxophone (1, 6, 10, 12)
- John Hagen – tenor saxophone
- Chris Anderson – trumpet (2, 10)
- Bob Gurland – vocal trumpet (10)
- Mindy Jostyn – harmonica (11), backing vocals
- Boz Scaggs – vocals
- Phoebe Snow – vocals
- Jeff Young & The Youngsters – vocals
- Dian Sorel – backing vocals
- Ula Hedwig – backing vocals

== Production ==
- Recorded by Elliot Scheiner and David Hewitt
- Mixed by Elliot Scheiner
- Remote Recording Services' Silver Truck
