= Through the Many Winters, A Christmas Album =

Studio album by Michael McDonald
- Released: November 1, 2005
- Studios: Bingham Bend (Leiper's Fork, Tennessee)
- Genres: Pop; Holiday
- Length: 40:29
- Label: Hallmark Cards
- Producers: Michael McDonald; Shannon Forrest; Grady Walker

Michael McDonald chronology
Motown Two (2004)	Through the Many Winters, A Christmas Album (2005)	Soul Speak (2008)

Through the Many Winters, A Christmas Album is a 2005 Christmas album by Michael McDonald. It was one of the first in the longstanding series of annual seasonal albums commissioned and retailed by Hallmark Cards to have reliable sales figures published, despite being sold through Hallmark's 4,000 card franchise shops, rather than through normal record shops in the Billboard chart system. The album was released three weeks before Thanksgiving, and reached Gold status (500,000 copies sold) two weeks after its release. At the time of its release, the album was priced at $7.95 with a purchase of three Hallmark cards.

== Track listing ==
1. "Silent Night" – 4:47
2. "O Holy Night" – 5:06
3. "Come, O Come Emanuel/What Month Was Jesus Born" – 4:10
4. "Deck the Halls/Jingle Bells" – 2:50
5. "O Tannenbaum" – 1:55
6. "Wexford Carol" – 5:01
7. "God Rest Ye Merry, Gentlemen" – 3:35
8. "Through the Many Winters" (Amy Holland / Michael McDonald) – 6:51
9. "Christmas on the Bayou" (McDonald / Grady Walker / Shannon Forrest) – 3:41
10. "Auld Lang Syne/O Tannenbaum (Reprise)" – 2:26

== Personnel ==
- Michael McDonald – vocals, acoustic guitar (1, 2, 9), bass (2–4, 7–10), acoustic piano (3, 4, 7), backing vocals (3), keyboards (5, 10), synthesizers (6, 7), dulcimer (6), Hammond B3 organ (7), Rhodes electric piano (8), Cajun accordion (9)
- Pat Coil – synthesizers (1), string arrangements (1, 2), keyboards (2, 8), Hammond B3 organ (3), acoustic piano (8)
- Josh Henson – electric guitars (3, 4, 6, 7), acoustic guitar (6), bass (6)
- Russell Bono – additional electric guitars (3), backing vocals (3)
- Tom Hemby – nylon guitar (8)
- Shannon Forrest – programming, drums (2–10)
- Conni Ellisor – strings (1, 2)
- Anthony LaMarchina – strings (1, 2)
- Mark Douthit – tenor saxophone (2, 3, 10), soprano saxophone (5)
- Stuart Duncan – fiddle (6, 9)
- Pat Bergeson – harmonica (8)
- Daniel Moore II – backing vocals (3, 7)
- Drea Rheneé – backing vocals (3, 7)
- Kabanya Vinson – backing vocals (3, 7)
- Amy Holland – vocals (6)

== Production ==
- Michael McDonald – producer
- Shannon Forrest – producer, engineer
- Grady Walker – producer, second engineer
- Jim DeMain – mastering at Yes Master (Nashville, Tennessee)
- Kathy Walker – production coordinator
- Joel Hoffner and Ken Levitan for Vector Management – management
