= Blink of an Eye (Michael McDonald album) =

1993 studio album by Michael McDonald

Studio album by Michael McDonald
- Released: August 3, 1993
- Studios: The Power Station (New York City); East Hill Studios (New York City); Capitol Studios (Hollywood); Westlake Audio (Los Angeles)
- Genre: Blue-eyed soul
- Length: 57:56
- Label: Reprise
- Producers: Russ Titelman; Michael McDonald

Michael McDonald chronology
Take It to Heart (1990)	Blink of an Eye (1993)	Blue Obsession (2000)

Professional ratings
Review scores
Source	Rating
AllMusic	3/5 stars

Blink of an Eye is the fourth solo studio album by American singer-songwriter Michael McDonald, released on August 3, 1993, by Reprise Records, three years after his previous studio album, Take It to Heart (1990).

== Background ==
McDonald described the title track in a 2024 Rolling Stone interview:

I remember talking to a receptionist at the studio where Donald Fagen was doing his solo record, or maybe mixing some of the original New York Rock and Soul Revue tracks. I was talking to the receptionist as I was leaving, and she goes, 'My mother always says be careful when you’re walking down there to get in a cab. Remember to look both ways when you cross the street here in New York.' And I laughed and she chuckled and that phrase stuck with me. Look both ways. I wanted to write something in a New Orleans second line feel. And that phrase kept haunting me.

'Blink of an eye' somehow came into play too, how life is basically the blink of an eye. You’re in high school and the next thing you know you find yourself in your forties. And at that point in your life and where I was at the time — I had kids and I was midlife — you tend to have this other perspective that you couldn’t have at any other time in your life, where you’re looking in both directions. You’re looking behind you to see how you got where you are, and you’re looking ahead to see what all this means and where you might be going. It’s a unique, weird perspective that you may never have again in your life. As you get older, you might tend to look more and more behind you and less and less in front of you.

So that’s what the song became about for me, and it recreated a flood of memories for me of growing up. Television was a big part of our lives growing up in the fifties. It was this new age of watching political events happen before your eyes. Watching Martin Luther King talk about things that made my parents reassess the reality of the American experience. The history of our country has been largely based on people who come along and make us see things and make us think about it. Our life experience is largely based on what we learned from people like that.

== Track listing ==
All tracks are written by Michael McDonald, except where noted.

No.	Title	Writer(s)	Length
1.	"I Stand for You"	McDonald; Chuck Sabatino	4:23
2.	"East of Eden"		5:29
3.	"More to Us Than That"		5:26
4.	"I Want You"	Paul Buchanan	4:16
5.	"No More Prayin'"		6:20
6.	"Matters of the Heart"		4:29
7.	"Hey Girl"	Carole King; Gerry Goffin	5:56
8.	"What Makes a Man Hold On"	McDonald; Sabatino	4:19
9.	"Blink of an Eye"	McDonald; George Perilli	4:55
10.	"Everlasting"	McDonald; Will Jennings	4:31
11.	"For a Child"		7:51
Total length:			57:56

== Personnel ==
=== Musicians ===
- Michael McDonald – lead vocals, backing vocals (1, 3–6, 10), keyboards (1–3, 5–8, 11), synth horns (8), synth horn arrangements (8), piano solo (8), Wurlitzer piano (9), synth Rhodes (10), synth bass (10), keyboard programming, basic track arrangements
- Jeff Bova – Hammond organ (1), keyboards (2–5, 7, 8), synth bass (2, 9), keyboard arrangements (4), clavinet (9), organ (10), drum programming (10), keyboard programming, basic track arrangements
- David Frank – synth horns (1, 8, 9), horn arrangements (1, 3, 9), synth bell (8), synth horn arrangements (8)
- Benmont Tench – Hammond organ (5, 8, 9)
- Randy Kerber – keyboards (7), synth strings (10), synth horn ensemble (11)
- Greg Phillinganes – piano (10)
- David Williams – guitar (1, 4)
- Bernie Chiaravalle – guitar (1, 3)
- Mike Campbell – guitar (2)
- Randy Jacobs – guitar (3), rhythm guitar (9)
- Fred Tackett – acoustic guitar (5)
- Dean Parks – acoustic guitar (6)
- Robben Ford – guitar (7), rhythm guitar (9)
- Warren Haynes – guitar solo (9)
- Paul Jackson Jr. – guitar (10)
- Pino Palladino – bass (1, 3, 7–9, 11)
- Nathan East – bass (2)
- Marcus Miller – bass (4)
- Freddie Washington – bass (5, 10)
- Jimmy Bralower – drum programming (1–7, 9, 11), basic track arrangements
- Manu Katché – additional drums (1), drums (4, 7–10)
- John Robinson – additional drums (3, 5), drums (9)
- Doug Scott – rhythm loop and sequencing (4), rhythm loop arrangement (4)
- George Perilli – additional drums (9)
- Lenny Castro – congas (3, 8), finger cymbals (6, 7), triangle (6, 7), tambourine (10)
- Brandon Fields – alto saxophone (1, 3, 4, 9)
- Albert Wing – tenor saxophone (1, 3, 9)
- Kirk Whalum – tenor saxophone (3, 7, 10)
- Lee Thornburg – trumpet (1, 3, 9)
- Wallace Roney – trumpet solo (11)
- Bruce Fowler – trombone (1)
- Chuck Findley – flügelhorn (11)
- Jenni Muldaur – backing vocals (1)
- Arnold McCuller – backing vocals (1, 10)
- Sweet Pea Atkinson – backing vocals (1, 10)
- Harry Bowen – backing vocals (1, 10)
- Mona Lisa Young – backing vocals (1, 10)
- Clydene Edwards – backing vocals (1)
- Amy Holland – backing vocals (4)
- Vince Gill – backing vocals (6)
- Alison Krauss – backing vocals (6)
- Chuck Sabatino – backing vocals (8, 10)
- Russ Titelman – basic track arrangements
- Robert Bell – keyboard arrangements (4)
- Paul Buchanan – keyboard arrangements (4)

=== Technical ===
- Produced by Russ Titelman and Michael McDonald
- Engineered by Ben Fowler, Mark Linett, and Bruce Barris
- Mixed by Tom Lord-Alge at Unique Recording Studios (New York City, New York)
- Mastered by Ted Jensen at Sterling Sound (New York City, New York)
- Production coordinator – Joanne Schwartz
- Additional production coordinator (Los Angeles) – Julie Larson
- Assistant engineers – Chris Fogel, Chris Albert, Charlie Paakkari, U.E. Nastasi, Steve Elder, and Mikael Ifverson
- Mix down assistant – Tim Leitner
- Technical assistant (original demo sequences) – Ross Pallone
- Package design – John Simon and Michael Diehl
- Cover art direction and photography – Bruce Steinberg
- Back cover photography – Gary Irving
- Back cover and inside photography – Tony Stone Images
