= Hutchison School =

Prep school in Memphis, Tennessee, US

Location
- 1740 Ridegway Road 38119; Memphis, Tennessee; United States; 35.092°N 89.855°W

Information
- Type: Independent, single-sex, college-preparatory, day
- Motto: Anywhere She Can Imagine
- Established: 1902
- Sister school: (Early Childhood-Middle School) Presbyterian Day School (Middle School-Upper School) Memphis University School
- Head of school: Kristen Ring
- Grades: PK2–12
- Gender: Female
- Enrollment: 792
- Colors: Black and gold
- Mascot: "Sting"
- Nickname: The Sting
- Accreditation: SAIS
- Newspaper: Signpost
- Yearbook: Lantern
- Feeder schools: Grace-St. Luke's Episcopal School, Woodland Presbyterian School, Christ Methodist Day School
- Feeder to: Itself
- Affiliations: ICGS, SAIS, TAIS, MAIS
- Website: www.hutchisonschool.org

Hutchison School is a private, independent, college-preparatory, day school for girls age 2 through 12th grade located in Memphis, Tennessee, United States. Hutchison is dedicated to academic excellence and to the parallel development of mind, body, and spirit as it educates young women for success in college and for lives of integrity and responsible citizenship. Hutchison is rated as an A+ school on Niche.

== History ==
In 1902, Mary Grimes Hutchison, a pioneer in rigorous education for girls in Memphis, opened Miss Hutchison’s School — now known as Hutchison School -- in the Wesley Halliburton home. Her first class had eight students.

The Old Love Place on Union Avenue became the site of Miss Hutchison's School for Girls from 1916 until 1925, when increased enrollment encouraged the board of directors to build a new school at 1925 Union Avenue (today, across from the Action News 5 Building). Upon Miss Hutchison's retirement, Dr. and Mrs. W.R. Atkinson purchased her school and, in 1954, converted it to a nonprofit corporation. In 1964, the school moved to its current 52-acre campus on Ridgeway Road. This is also when it began to be known as “Hutchison School.”

The school has been guided by several prominent Heads of School throughout its 120+ year history:

- Mary Grimes Hutchison (1902–1947)
- Dr. W.R. Atkinson (1947–1959)
- Dr. Robert D. Lynn (1959–1979)
- Jack B. Stanford (1979–1995)
- Linda MacMurray Gibbs (1995–2000)
- Dr. Annette C. Smith (2000–2017)
- Dr. Kristen D. Ring (Current Head of School)

In December 2024, the State of Tennessee recognized how Hutchison has made a difference in local and state communities for over 100 years.

== Divisions ==
- Early Childhood: Little Hive (2-year-olds), Pre-Kindergarten, and Junior Kindergarten
- Lower School: Kindergarten-4th grade
- Middle School: 5th-8th grade
- Upper School: 9th–12th grade

== Academics ==
Hutchison has an A+ rating in Academics, according to Niche. Hutchison offers a college preparatory program with opportunities in STEM, arts, athletics, leadership, community service, entrepreneurship, wellness, student clubs and organizations, internships, fellowships, and mentorships.

Alumnae have continued their research and scholarship through the Fulbright program and organizations like the Udall Foundation.

== Notable alumni ==
- Allida Black (class of 1970), historian and political activist
- Louise Fitzhugh (class of 1946), author of Harriet the Spy
- Virginia Williams (class of 1996), actress
- Anne Kirkpatrick (class of 1977), police chief of New Orleans, Louisiana
- Dana Buchman (class of 1969), fashion designer
- Lisa Patton (class of 1976), author
