= Wide Open (Michael McDonald album) =

Studio album by Michael McDonald
- Released: September 15, 2017
- Studio: Metal Building Studio (Nolensville, Tennessee)
- Genre: Blue-eyed soul
- Length: 71:00
- Labels: Chonin; BMG
- Producers: Shannon Forrest; Michael McDonald

Michael McDonald chronology
Soul Speak (2008)	Wide Open (2017)	Live on Soundstage (2018)

Wide Open is the tenth solo album by American musician Michael McDonald, released on September 15, 2017 by Chonin Records and BMG. Shannon Forrest and McDonald produced the album. Wide Open is McDonald's first album of original material in 16 years since In the Spirit: A Christmas Album (2001).

== Background ==
In an interview with Billboard, Michael McDonald said many of the songs on Wide Open have to do with sobriety: "I realized that a lot of the songs, I put them in different context, storyline wise, but if they're about anything, they're about my coming to terms with my living out in the open and learning to live without substances to fill the hole, without self-medicating".

== Critical reception ==
Professional ratings
Review scores
Source	Rating
AllMusic	4/5 stars

AllMusic senior editor Stephen Thomas Erlewine found that while McDonald "happily trades on the slow-burning R&B grooves and soft rock melodicism that made him a star in the '70s and '80s, there's not much of a feeling of pandering nostalgia here. Instead, McDonald seems to be integrating all his personas – the soul true believer, the godfather of smooth – in a record that not only feels true but, song for song, is sturdier than nearly all of the albums he recorded at his popular peak".

== Track listing ==
All tracks produced by Michael McDonald and Shannon Forrest.

No.	Title	Writer(s)	Length
1.	"Hail Mary"	Michael McDonald	6:52
2.	"Just Strong Enough"	McDonald; Gary Nicholson	7:58
3.	"Find It in Your Heart"	McDonald; John Goodwin	5:47
4.	"Half Truth"	McDonald; Dylan McDonald; Grady Walker	5:41
5.	"Ain't No Good"	McDonald; Goodwin	4:25
6.	"Honest Emotion"	McDonald; Charles Fichtel; Goodwin	5:31
7.	"Blessing in Disguise"	McDonald; Beth Nielsen Chapman; Bernie Chiaravalle; John Peppard	5:56
8.	"Dark Side"	M. McDonald	5:53
9.	"If You Wanted to Hurt Me"	McDonald; Peter Leinheiser	5:14
10.	"Beautiful Child"	McDonald; Chiaravalle; Chuck Sabatino	6:09
11.	"Too Short"	McDonald; Russ Bono	5:22
12.	"Free a Man"	Richard Stekol	6:07
Total length:			71:00

== Personnel ==
Musicians

- Michael McDonald – vocals, Wurlitzer organ (1, 4, 9, 10), electric guitar (1), acoustic piano (2, 8, 9), Rhodes electric piano (3, 7), harmonica (4), Wurlitzer electric piano (5), keyboards (6), acoustic guitar (6, 8, 10), additional synth pads and brass pad (7), clavinet (7, 9), synthesizers (8)
- Larry Goldings – Hammond B3 organ (1, 3, 8, 12)
- Tim Akers – synthesizers (3)
- Jeff Roach – synthesizers (4, 10)
- David Paich – synthesizers (5), Hammond B3 organ (5, 9–11)
- John Peppard – synth sequencing (7)
- Steve Porcaro – synthesizers (7), synth effects (7)
- Mike Rojas – Rhodes electric piano (12)
- Andrew Ramsey – electric guitar (1)
- Warren Haynes – electric guitar (2)
- Robben Ford – electric guitar solo (2)
- Michael Landau – electric guitar (3, 7, 9, 11, 12), slide guitar (4), guitar solo outro (4), guitar solo (5), electric guitar fills (10)
- Dann Huff – electric guitar (4, 8), acoustic guitar (4, 8), guitar solo (4)
- Sol Littlefield – additional electric guitar (4), electric guitar solo (10)
- Bernie Chiaravalle – 12-string guitar (4), acoustic guitar (5)
- David Levita – electric guitar (5, 8, 10), additional guitar (7), acoustic guitar (11), additional electric guitar (11), electric rhythm guitar (12), "robot" guitar solo (12)
- Ilya Toshinski – acoustic guitar (6), banjo (6), mandolin (6), additional guitar (8)
- Danny Rader – acoustic guitar (10), bouzouki (10)
- Craig Young – bass (1, 10)
- Willie Weeks – bass (2)
- Marcus Miller – bass (3, 9)
- Lance Morrison – bass (4)
- Tony Lucido – bass (5)
- Tommy Sims – bass (7, 11)
- Leland Sklar – bass (8)
- Michael Rhodes – bass (12)
- Shannon Forrest – drums, percussion (1, 3–7, 9–12), drum programming (3, 4, 6–8), synthesizers (6), synth bass (6), brushes (6), drum loops (10)
- Mark Douthit – saxophone solo (1), saxophones (2, 11)
- Ward Smith – tenor saxophone (2)
- Tom Scott – saxophone solo (3, 12)
- Branford Marsalis – soprano saxophone (7)
- Scott Mayo – alto saxophone (9, 12), tenor saxophone (9, 12)
- George Shelby – baritone saxophone (9, 12), tenor saxophone (9, 12)
- Matt Perrine – sousaphone (2)
- Barry Green – trombone (2)
- Mark Mullins – trombone (2)
- Andrew Lippman – trombone (9, 12)
- Bobby Campo – trumpet (2)
- Steve Patrick – trumpet (2)
- Michael Leonhart – trumpet (3), flugelhorn (3)
- Harry Kim – trumpet (9, 12)
- The Kris Wilkinson Strings – strings (2)
- Amy Holland – guest vocals (1)
- Drea Rheneé – guest vocals (9)

Music arrangements

- Michael McDonald – horn arrangements (1), string arrangements (8)
- Matt McCauley – string arrangements and conductor (2)
- Mark Mullins – horn arrangements (2)
- Mark Douthit – additional horn arrangements (2), saxophone arrangement (11)
- Michael Leonhart – horn arrangements (3)
- Shannon Forrest – string arrangements (6)
- John Peppard – original arrangements (7)
- David Frank – horn arrangements (9, 12)

== Production ==
- Michael McDonald – producer
- Shannon Forrest – producer, recording, mixing
- Jarad Clement – additional engineer
- Jasper LeMaster – additional engineer
- Grady Walker – additional engineer
- Nathan Yarborough – additional engineer
- Bob Ludwig – mastering at Gateway Mastering (Portland, Maine)
- Kathy Walker – production assistant
- Jordan Fann – art direction, package design
- Joel Hoffner – art direction, package design
- Jon Romero – art direction, package design
- Vector Management – management

== Charts ==
Chart (2017)	Peak position
US Current Album Sales (Billboard)	40
US Independent Albums (Billboard)	12
