= Smoke from a Distant Fire =

1977 single by Sanford-Townsend Band

Single by Sanford-Townsend Band

from the album Sanford-Townsend Band
- B-side: "Lou"
- Released: 1977
- Genre: Pop
- Length: 3:30
- Label: Warner Bros. Records
- Songwriter(s): Ed Sanford; John Townsend; Steven Stewart
- Producer(s): Barry Beckett; Jerry Wexler

Sanford-Townsend Band singles chronology
"Shake It to the Right" (1977)	"Smoke from a Distant Fire" (1977)	"Eye of My Storm (Oh Woman)" (1978)

"Smoke from a Distant Fire" is a song by American duo Sanford-Townsend Band. It was released as a single in 1977 from their self-titled album.

The song peaked at No. 9 on the Billboard Hot 100 on the week ending September 17, 1977, becoming the duo's only Top 40 hit.

== Chart performance ==
Chart (1977)	Peak position
U.S. Billboard Hot 100	9
U.S. Billboard Adult Contemporary	34
Australia (KMR)	44

== See also ==
- List of one-hit wonders in the United States
