= The New York Rock and Soul Revue =

US musical group (1989–1993)

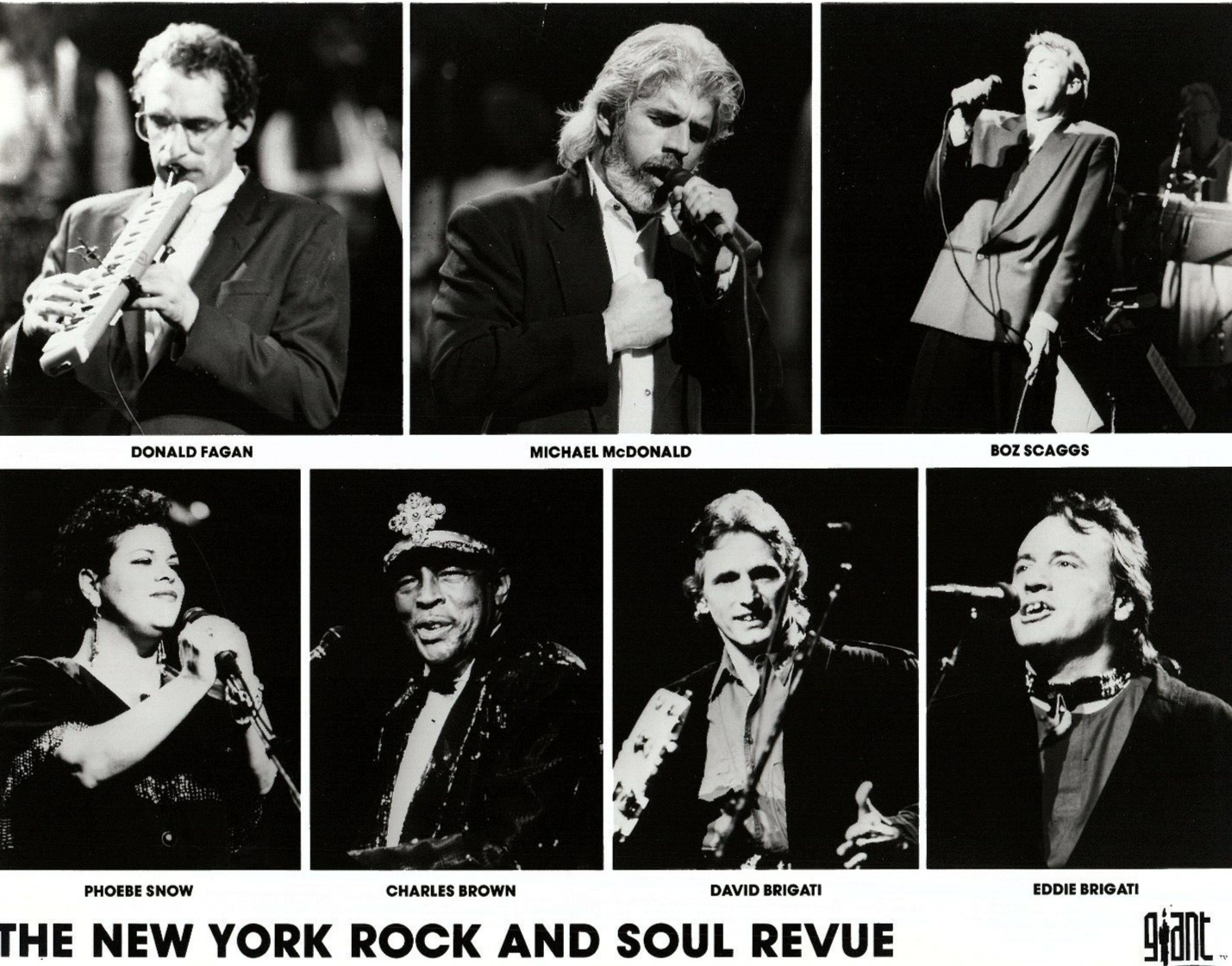
- Giant Records' promotional sheet for the performance that produced the Live At The Beacon release

Background information
- Origin: New York City, New York, U.S.
- Genres: rock; funk/soul; blues; pop
- Years active: 1989–1993
- Label: Giant
- Past members: Donald Fagen; David Brigati; Eddie Brigati; Charles Brown; Michael McDonald; Patti Austin; Boz Scaggs; Phoebe Snow

The New York Rock and Soul Revue was a musical project supergroup that evolved out of a series of concerts produced and promoted by singer-songwriter Libby Titus at the Lone Star Roadhouse, the Spectrum and other Northeast concert venues, eventually coalescing around unofficial "band leader" Donald Fagen from 1989–1993.

The project's only release is a 1991 live album The New York Rock and Soul Revue: Live at the Beacon (Giant Records), a compilation of material recorded earlier that year from live performances at New York City's Beacon Theatre.

== Formation ==
Fagen, the frontman and co-founder of Steely Dan, had largely focused on songwriting during that group's near decade-long hiatus in the 80s, and would go on to credit the unique blend of veteran talent Titus had assembled with reigniting his passion for performing live. It featured various musicians including Michael McDonald, Boz Scaggs and Phoebe Snow.

== Aftermath ==
The project resurrected in new form as The Dukes of September in early 2010's featuring Donald Fagen, Michael McDonald and Boz Scaggs.

== Discography ==
=== Live albums ===
Year	Album details
1991	Live at the Beacon: Released: October 29, 1991; Label: Giant Records

== Members ==
- Donald Fagen – leader, vocals, piano
- Chris Anderson – trumpet
- Walter Becker – guitar
- David Brigati – vocals
- Eddie Brigati – vocals
- Charles Brown – vocals, keyboards
- Cornelius Bumpus – tenor saxophone
- Danny Caron – guitar
- Larry DeBari – guitar
- Bob Gurland – vocal trumpet
- John Hagen – tenor saxophone
- Philip Hamilton – percussion, backing vocals
- Ula Hedwig – backing vocals
- Mindy Jostyn – harmonica, vocals
- Dennis McDermott – drums
- Michael McDonald – piano and vocals
- Catherine Russell – backing vocals
- Boz Scaggs – guitar, vocals
- Lincoln Schleifer – bass
- Phoebe Snow – vocals
- Dian Sorel – backing vocals
- Jimmy Vivino – guitar
- Jeff Young & The Youngsters – piano, backing vocals
- Drew Zingg – guitar
