= Blue Obsession =

Studio album by Michael McDonald
- Released: March 28, 2000
- Recorded: 1996–1999
- Studios: The Bennett House (Franklin); The Dugout (Nashville); Sound Kitchen (Franklin); Love Shack (Nashville); Sound Stage (Nashville); Sixteenth Ave. Sound (Nashville); Northbeach (Franklin); Woodland Studios (Nashville); Bingham Bend (Leipers Fork); Orange Whip (Santa Barbara)
- Genre: Blue-eyed soul
- Length: 60:03
- Label: Ramp Records
- Producers: Tommy Sims; Michael McDonald; Bernie Chiaravalle; Chris Pelonis

Michael McDonald chronology
Blink of an Eye (1993)	Blue Obsession (2000)	Motown (2003)

Professional ratings
Review scores
Source	Rating
AllMusic	3/5 stars

Blue Obsession is the fifth solo album by American singer-songwriter Michael McDonald, released on March 28, 2000, by Ramp Records.

== Background ==
The album was originally planned for release on the Reprise label in 1997, however, it was pulled before it got to stores, although a few advance copies did get out. The original track listing included three songs that were replaced on the final release, including a cover of "Tell It Like It Is" by Aaron Neville.

== Track listing ==
No.	Title	Writer(s)	Length
1.	"All I Need"	Michael McDonald; Tommy Sims	5:41
2.	"No Love to Be Found"	McDonald; Bernie Chiaravalle	5:32
3.	"Obsession Blues"	McDonald; Chiaravalle	4:36
4.	"Where Would I Be Now"	McDonald; Tony Joe White	6:09
5.	"Build Upon It"	McDonald; Chiaravalle	5:06
6.	"The Meaning of Love"	McDonald; Jim Photoglo	5:31
7.	"Open the Door"	McDonald; Tommy Sims	5:50
8.	"Kikwit Town"	McDonald; Chester Thompson	5:42
9.	"Down by the River"	Neil Young	5:37
10.	"Someday You Will"	McDonald; Chiaravalle	4:24
11.	"Ain't That Peculiar"	Smokey Robinson; Marvin Tarplin; Robert Rogers; Warren Moore	5:15
12.	"You Can't Make It Love"	McDonald; John Scott Sherrill	4:27

== Personnel ==
Credits adapted from the album's liner notes.

=== Musicians ===
- Michael McDonald – lead vocals, backing vocals (11), synthesizers (2, 4, 8, 10), Wurlitzer (3, 7), piano (4, 5, 11, 12), clavinet (5), B3 organ (9), spoken lyric (11), vocal arrangements (2), rhythm arrangements (2, 3, 6, 8, 10)
- Tommy Sims – keyboards (1, 6, 8), bass (1–3, 6–8, 10), duet vocals (1), clavinet (2), rhythm guitar (2), guitars (6, 7), drum programming (6), synthesizers (7), piano (8, 10), percussion (8), rhythm arrangements (1, 2, 6–8), horn arrangements (1, 2, 7), vocal arrangements (1, 2)
- Marc Harris – B3 organ (1, 4–7, 12), clavinet (5)
- Billy Livsey – B3 organ (2, 10)
- Johnny Neel – B3 organ (3)
- Tim Akers – B3 organ (4), horn arrangements (1, 2, 7), string arrangements (1, 8), string conductor (1)
- Joe Houge – B3 organ (11), programming (11), sampling (11)
- David Pack – additional keyboards (11), guitars (11)
- Chris Rodriguez – guitars (1, 11), acoustic guitar (12)
- Bernie Chiaravalle – rhythm guitar (2), guitar solo (2), rhythm arrangements (2, 3, 10), guitars (3–5, 10), side-stick (4), cymbal (4), shaker (5)
- George Cocchini – acoustic guitar (3), guitars (8)
- Will Owsley – electric guitar (3)
- Gordon Kennedy – acoustic guitar (6, 10), electric guitar (10)
- Chris Pelonis – guitars (9)
- Chris Kent – electric bass (5)
- Todd Smith – bass (9)
- Dan Needham – drums (1–3, 7, 8, 10), percussion (3)
- Yvette Preyer – drums (4, 5), tambourine (5)
- Chester Thompson – wave drum (8)
- Brian Zsupnik – drums (9)
- George Perilli – drums (11)
- Tom Roady – percussion (1, 7)
- Terry McMillan – percussion (4), congas (5)
- Danny Duncan – sound effects (8), percussion (10)
- Mark Douthit – saxophone (1, 2, 7)
- Doug Moffet – saxophone (1, 2, 7)
- Denis Solee – saxophone (1, 2, 7)
- Barry Green – trombone (1)
- Mike Haynes – trumpet (1)
- Sam Levine – flute (6)
- Bobby Taylor – oboe (6)
- Viktor Krauss – bass fiddle (4)
- The Nashville String Machine – strings (1, 6)
- Carl Gorodetzky – concertmaster (1, 6), violin (8)
- Anthony LaMarchina – cello (1, 6)
- Bob Mason – cello (1, 6, 8)
- Carol McClure – harp (1, 6)
- Alan Umstead – viola (1, 6)
- Gary Vanosdale – viola (1, 6)
- Kris Wilkinson – viola (1, 6, 8)
- David Davidson – violin (1, 6)
- Conni Ellisor – violin (1, 6)
- Lee Larrison – violin (1, 6)
- Pamela Sixfin – violin (1, 6, 8)
- Mary Kathryn Vanosdale – violin (1, 6)
- Tabitha Fair – backing vocals (1)
- Angelo Petrucci – backing vocals (1)
- Veronica Petrucci – backing vocals (1)
- Nicol Smith – backing vocals (1, 8)
- Chris Willis – backing vocals (1)
- Wendy Moten – co-lead vocals (2), backing vocals (2), vocal arrangements (2)
- Amy Holland McDonald – harmony vocals (4), backing vocals (7, 9)
- Rodney Covington – backing vocals (5), background vocal arrangements (5)
- Stacy Covington – backing vocals (5)
- Delores Cox – backing vocals (5)
- Ladre Fayne – backing vocals (5)
- Pamela Holman – backing vocals (5)
- Alfreda McCrary – backing vocals (5)
- Tiffany Palmer – backing vocals (5)
- Demitria Slaydon – backing vocals (5)
- Duane Starling – backing vocals (5)
- Timothy Terry – backing vocals (5)
- Karla Bonoff – backing vocals (9)
- Christopher Cross – backing vocals (9)
- Claude McKnight – backing vocals (10)
- Joey Kibble – backing vocals (10)
- Mark Kibble – backing vocals (10)
- Toby McKeehan – co-lead vocals (11), backing vocals (11), spoken lyric (11)
- Kevin Max Smith – backing vocals (11)
- Michael Tait – backing vocals (11)
- Ronn Huff – string arrangements and conductor (6)

=== Technical ===
- Produced by Tommy Sims (1–3, 6–8, 10, 12), Michael McDonald (4, 5, 9, 11), Bernie Chiaravalle (4, 5), and David Pack (11)
- Production coordinators – Bridgett Evans O'Lannerghty, Gail Chiaravalle, and Susan Henson
- Engineered by Martin Woodlee, Greg Rubin, Jon Lechner, Ben Fowler, Grady Walker, Andy Gerome, Chris Pelonis, Russ Martin, and Mark Casselman
- Mixed by Greg Rubin (1, 7, 8, 10, 12), Rick Will (2–6, 11), and Chris Pelonis (9)
- Assistant engineers – Shawn McLean, Hank Nirider, Joe Costa, Tim Coyle, Reid Shippen, Tony Green, Graham Lewis, Dave Dillbeck, and Mark Frigo
- Hard disk editing and programming assistance – Danny Duncan, Joe Houge, and Shane Gue (4, 5)
- Track editing – Joe Houge (11)
- Art direction – Bruce Steinberg
- Package design – Simon Design
- Front cover photography – Dennis Keeley
- Back cover photography – Gary Braasch/Tony Stone Images
- Inside turtle photography – Bruce Steinberg
- Personal management – Greg Fruin, Howard Kaufman, H.K. Management
