= I Keep Forgettin' (Every Time You're Near) =

Single by Michael McDonald

from the album If That's What It Takes
- B-side: "Losin' End"
- Released: August 1982
- Recorded: Warner Bros. Recording Studio (North Hollywood, Los Angeles)
- Genre: Quiet storm; R&B
- Length: 3:39
- Label: Warner Bros.
- Songwriters: Michael McDonald; Ed Sanford; Jerry Leiber; Mike Stoller
- Producers: Ted Templeman; Lenny Waronker

Michael McDonald singles chronology
"I Keep Forgettin' (Every Time You're Near)" (1982)	"I Gotta Try" (1982)

Music video
- "I Keep Forgettin' (Every Time You're Near)" on YouTube

"I Keep Forgettin' (Every Time You're Near)" (also known as "I Keep Forgettin'") is a 1982 song by American musician Michael McDonald, from his debut studio album If That's What It Takes (1982). It was written by McDonald and Ed Sanford. Released as a single, it peaked at No. 4 on the U.S. Billboard Pop Singles charts, No. 7 R&B and No. 8 on the Adult Contemporary chart.

Similarity to Chuck Jackson's 1962 song "I Keep Forgettin'", composed by Jerry Leiber and Mike Stoller, resulted in Leiber and Stoller also being given a songwriting credit for the song.

== Background ==
Michael McDonald recorded it with his sister Maureen McDonald providing backing vocals. It was featured on If That's What It Takes, his first solo studio album away from the Doobie Brothers.

Greg Phillinganes, Steve Lukather and Jeff Porcaro played the clavinet, guitar and drums respectively. Bassist Louis Johnson, from the Brothers Johnson, laid down the song's pronounced bassline.

== Critical reception ==
Billboard characterized "I Keep Forgettin'" as a "soulful crooner" and a "midtempo ballad". They felt that the song resembled "Real Love" and "Minute by Minute" by The Doobie Brothers, particularly through the "terse, understated guitar and keyboard figures". Cashbox also identified similarities between "I Keep Forgettin'" and McDonald's work with The Doobie Brothers, specifically drawing comparisons to "You Belong to Me", albeit with stronger influences of R&B and jazz.

== Influence, covers, and sampling ==
McDonald's song was heavily sampled by Warren G on his hit 1994 single "Regulate", featuring Nate Dogg, and by Jadakiss on "Kiss Is Spittin'", which also features Nate Dogg. Young MC sampled it on his song "Love You Slow" from his third studio album What's the Flavor?. Dave Hollister covered the song on his debut solo studio album Ghetto Hymns, where it's titled "Keep Forgettin'" and is slowed down noticeably but keeps the same lyrics. The song's chorus is interpolated by Moloko in an acoustic mix of their 2003 hit single "Familiar Feeling". The song's bassline also was sampled in the track "Next to You" by the nu-disco and chillwave duo Poolside.

British singer-songwriter Julia Fordham performed the song in duet with McDonald on her eighth studio album China Blue (2008). Patti LaBelle covered the song on her 2005 studio album Classic Moments titled as "I Keep Forgetting". In 2011, Bosnian-German DJ Solomun sampled the song on ''Love Recycled''. Laura Jane Grace, lead vocalist, songwriter and guitarist of the punk rock band Against Me!, performed a live version of the song in April 2015 for A.V. Undercover web series.

== Personnel ==
- Michael McDonald – lead vocals; electric piano
- Steve Lukather – guitar
- Greg Phillinganes – clavinet
- Louis Johnson – bass guitar
- Jeff Porcaro – drums
- Maureen McDonald – backing vocals

== Chart history ==
=== Weekly charts ===
Chart (1982–1986)	Peak position
Australia (Kent Music Report)	64
Canada RPM Adult Contemporary	5
Canada RPM Top Singles	17
UK Singles Chart	43
US Billboard Hot 100	4
US Billboard R&B	7
US Billboard Adult Contemporary	8
US Cash Box Top 100	4

=== Year-end charts ===
Chart (1982–1983)	Peak position
US Billboard Hot 100	81
US Cash Box	24
