= Sweet Freedom (song) =

1986 single by Michael McDonald

Single by Michael McDonald

from the album Sweet Freedom and Running Scared soundtrack
- B-side: "The Freedom Eights"
- Released: June 1986
- Recorded: 1986
- Studio: Westlake Audio (Los Angeles)
- Genre: R&B; blue-eyed soul; dance-pop
- Length: 3:57 (single version); 7:38 (soundtrack album version)
- Label: MCA
- Songwriter: Rod Temperton
- Producers: Rod Temperton; Bruce Swedien; Richard Rudolph (credited as Dick Rudolph)

Michael McDonald singles chronology
"Lost in the Parade" (1985)	"Sweet Freedom" (1986)	"Our Love" (1986)

Official audio
- "Sweet Freedom" on YouTube

"Sweet Freedom" is a 1986 song by American musician Michael McDonald from his compilation album of the same name, written by Rod Temperton. It was originally featured on Running Scared's soundtrack, before the 1986 re-release of McDonald's 1985 album No Lookin' Back. The track peaked at No. 7 in the US Billboard Hot 100 chart (his last top 10 hit in that chart), No. 12 in the UK, and No. 14 in Canada.

The single's music video directed by Leslie Libman featured McDonald, along with actors Billy Crystal and Gregory Hines, in the film Running Scared.

The second part of the long version of the song appears on the B-side of the single, in modified and extended form, as "The Freedom Eights."

== Credits ==
- Lead vocals – Michael McDonald
- Backing vocals – Michael McDonald and Siedah Garrett
- Guitars – Paul Jackson Jr. and Michael Thompson
- Keyboards – Greg Phillinganes, Anthony Patler, Danny Sembello, Rod Temperton, Larry Williams
- Synthesizer – Larry Williams
- Synclavier – Wells Christie
- Horns – David Boruff, Chuck Findley, Gary Grant, Jerry Hey, Kim Hutchcroft, Bill Reichenbach, Larry Williams
- Arrangements – Rod Temperton
- Producers – Bruce Swedien, Rod Temperton and Dick Rudolph
- Recorded and mixed by Bruce Swedien at Westlake Audio (Los Angeles, CA)

== Charts ==
Chart (1986–1987)	Peak position
Canada The Record Singles Chart	25
Canada Top Singles (RPM)	14
UK Singles (Official Charts)	12
US Adult Contemporary (Billboard)	4
US Billboard Hot 100	7
US Dance Club Songs (Billboard)	8
US Hot R&B/Hip-Hop Songs (Billboard)	17

Year-end chart (1986)	Rank
US Top Pop Singles (Billboard)	75

== Other notable versions ==
- In 1998, Shawn Christopher released her version which reached No. 60 in France.
- In 2002, Danish electronic percussion duo Safri Duo, featuring Michael McDonald, covered the song. It was released in June as the fourth and final single from their debut album, Episode II. This version charted in many European countries, reaching No. 2 in Spain.

=== Charts ===
Weekly chart performance for Safri Duo remix
Chart (2002)	Peak Position
Austria (Ö3 Austria Top 40)	50
Belgium (Ultratop 50 Flanders)	50
Belgium (Ultratip Bubbling Under Wallonia)	3
Denmark Airplay (Tracklisten)	2
Germany (GfK)	29
Italy (FIMI)	39
Netherlands (Dutch Top 40)	20
Netherlands (Single Top 100)	23
Spain (Promusicae)	2
UK Singles (OCC)	54
UK Dance (OCC)	21
