= Motown (album) =

Studio album by Michael McDonald
- Released: June 24, 2003
- Recorded: Nashville, Tennessee; Los Angeles, California; New York; Nice, France
- Genre: Soul
- Length: 56:18
- Labels: Universal; Motown
- Producer: Simon Climie

Michael McDonald chronology
Blue Obsession (2000)	Motown (2003)	Motown Two (2004)

Professional ratings
Review scores
Source	Rating
AllMusic	3/5 stars

Motown is the sixth solo album by American singer-songwriter Michael McDonald. The album was released on June 24, 2003, by Universal Music International and Motown.

== Track listing ==
No.	Title	Writer(s)	Originally recorded by	Length
1.	"I Heard It Through the Grapevine"	Norman Whitfield; Barrett Strong	Gladys Knight & the Pips	3:44
2.	"You Are Everything"	Thom Bell; Linda Creed	The Stylistics (covered by Diana Ross and Marvin Gaye)	2:48
3.	"Signed, Sealed, Delivered I'm Yours"	Stevie Wonder; Lee Garrett; Syreeta Wright; Lula Mae Hardaway	Stevie Wonder	4:07
4.	"I'm Gonna Make You Love Me"	Kenny Gamble; Jerry Ross	Diana Ross and The Supremes and The Temptations	3:56
5.	"Ain't Nothing Like the Real Thing"	Ashford & Simpson	Marvin Gaye and Tammi Terrell	2:48
6.	"Reflections"	Holland–Dozier–Holland	Diana Ross and The Supremes	3:22
7.	"How Sweet It Is (To Be Loved by You)"	Holland–Dozier–Holland	Marvin Gaye	5:21
8.	"Ain't No Mountain High Enough f/ Fourplay"	Ashford & Simpson	Marvin Gaye and Tammi Terrell	2:49
9.	"All in Love Is Fair"	Stevie Wonder	Stevie Wonder	3:31
10.	"I Want You"	Leon Ware; Arthur "T-Boy" Ross	Marvin Gaye	4:27
11.	"Distant Lover"	Marvin Gaye; Gwen Gordy Fuqua; Sandra Greene	Marvin Gaye	4:20
12.	"I Believe (When I Fall in Love It Will Be Forever)"	Stevie Wonder; Yvonne Wright	Stevie Wonder	5:05
13.	"Since I Lost My Baby"	Smokey Robinson; Warren "Pete" Moore	The Temptations	4:34
14.	"Too High"	Stevie Wonder	Stevie Wonder	5:25

== Personnel ==
Musicians

- Michael McDonald – lead vocals, Rhodes electric piano (6), acoustic piano (13)
- Toby Baker – keyboards (1–12), drum programming (1–8, 10–12), guitars (2, 10), acoustic guitar (4), electric guitar (4), bass guitar (13), synth vocals (14)
- Tony Swain – Rhodes electric piano (1, 8), keyboards (2), synthesizers (12)
- Tim Akers – Hammond B3 organ (1, 6, 7, 11, 13)
- Tim Carmon – Hammond B3 organ (10)
- Bob James – keyboards (14)
- Chris Rodriguez – electric guitar (1, 3, 7, 8, 12), electric sitar (2), sitar (3)
- Michael Thompson – guitars (3, 6, 8), electric guitars (10)
- Simon Climie – acoustic guitar (4), electric guitar (4)
- Tommy Sims – electric guitar (11)
- Larry Carlton – guitars (14)
- Nathan East – bass (3, 6–8, 10, 12, 14)
- Nicky Shaw – additional drums (1), bass programming (6, 11), drums (6, 7, 9, 11), percussion (7), programming (7, 9)
- Ricky Lawson – drums (3, 6, 8, 10, 12)
- Harvey Mason – drums (14), percussion (14)
- Paul Waller – percussion (1), additional programming (1, 9, 12), sound replacing (3, 12), effects (9)
- Mark Douthit – saxophone (4, 11)
- Isobel Griffiths – orchestra contractor (1, 5, 9, 10)
- Gavyn Wright – string leader (1, 5, 9, 10)

Background vocalists

- Jennifer Karr – backing vocals (1)
- Gale Mayes-West – backing vocals (1, 3, 4, 6, 8, 12)
- Ann McCrary – backing vocals (1, 3, 4, 6, 8, 12)
- Tammy Taylor – backing vocals (1, 3, 4, 6, 8, 12)
- Tracy Ackerman – backing vocals (2, 5)
- Alfreda McCrary Lee – backing vocals (3, 6, 12)
- Dwayne Starling – backing vocals (3, 6, 12)
- Kevin Whalum – backing vocals (3, 6, 12)
- Simon Climie – backing vocals (5, 7)
- Michael McDonald – backing vocals (7, 10)
- Tommy Sims – backing vocals (7)
- Leon Ware – backing vocals (10)
- Amy Holland – backing vocals (11)
- Audrey Martells – backing vocals (11)

Music arrangements

- Toby Baker – arrangements (1–5, 8, 10, 12)
- Simon Climie – arrangements (1–5, 7–12)
- Cliff Masterson – string arrangements (1, 5)
- Nicky Shaw – arrangements (6, 7, 9, 11)
- Nick Ingman – string arrangements (9, 10)
- Michael McDonald – arrangements (13)
- Bob James – arrangements (14)
- Fourplay – arrangements (14)

== Production ==
- Tony Swain – executive producer
- Simon Climie – producer
- Dee Harrington – album coordinator
- Lisa Patton – production coordinator (Nashville)
- Debbie Johnson – production coordinator (Los Angeles)
- Michael Wilson – cover photography
- Richard Orga – wardrobe
- Cindy Rich – make-up
- Fred Davis – legal
- Evelyn Morgan – Universal business affairs (New York)
- Vector Management – management

Technical credits

- Bob Ludwig – mastering at Gateway Mastering (Portland, Maine)
- Mick Guzauski – mixing at Barking Doctor Recording (Mount Kisco, New York)
- Tom Bender – mix assistant
- Simon Climie – Pro Tools engineer, Pro Tools programming, Pro Tools (14)
- Ben Fowler – engineer (Nashville)
- Don Murray – engineer (Los Angeles), engineer (14)
- Alan Douglas – orchestral engineer (1, 5, 9, 10)
- Jonathan Shakovskoy – Pro Tools engineer (10)
- Adam Brown – engineer (13), Pro Tools (13)
- Joel Evenden – Pro Tools assistant, assistant engineer (10)
- Shannon Forrest – Pro Tools engineer (Nashville) additional engineer (Nashville)
- Grady Walker – second engineer (Nashville)
- Tom Sweeney – assistant engineer (Los Angeles)
- Nicky Shaw – drum editing (12)

== Charts ==
=== Weekly charts ===
Chart (2003–04)	Peak position
US Billboard 200	14
US Top R&B/Hip-Hop Albums (Billboard)	17

=== Year-end charts ===
Chart (2004)	Position
US Billboard 200	69
US Top R&B/Hip-Hop Albums (Billboard)	65
