= No Lookin' Back (song) =

Single by Michael McDonald

from the album No Lookin' Back
- B-side: "Don't Let Me Down"; "I Gotta Try" (UK 12" only)
- Released: July 15, 1985
- Genre: Pop rock
- Length: 3:55
- Label: Warner Bros.
- Songwriters: Michael McDonald; Kenny Loggins; Ed Sanford
- Producers: Michael McDonald; Ted Templeman

Michael McDonald singles chronology
"Playin' by the Rules" (1983)	"No Lookin' Back" (1985)	"Bad Times" (1985)

Music video
- "No Lookin' Back" on YouTube

"No Lookin' Back" is a song written by Michael McDonald, Kenny Loggins and Ed Sanford. The best-known version was recorded by American recording artist Michael McDonald and is the first single from his second solo studio album of the same name.

Cashbox described "No Lookin' Back" as "harder rocking" than some of McDonald's previous singles, with a "fast-pace beat and tastefully placed keyboard and guitar fills". The song was included on the soundtrack to the crime drama film Thelma & Louise (1991), starring Susan Sarandon and Geena Davis.

== Track listing ==
- 12" Single (Warner Bros. W 8960 T)
1. "No Lookin' Back"
2. "Don't Let Me Down"
3. "I Gotta Try"
- 7" Single (Warner Bros. 928 960-7)
1. "No Lookin' Back"
2. "Don't Let Me Down"

== Personnel ==
Credits are adapted from the album's liner notes.

Musicians

- Michael McDonald – vocals, keyboards
- David Pack – guitars
- Willie Weeks – bass
- Jeff Porcaro – drums
- George Perilli – tom (drum) solo

== Chart performance ==
Chart (1985)	Position
Canada Top Singles (RPM)	52
Canada Adult Contemporary (RPM)	12
US Billboard Hot 100	34
US Adult Contemporary (Billboard)	18
US Mainstream Rock (Billboard)	4

== Kenny Loggins version ==
"No Lookin' Back" was originally recorded by co-writer Kenny Loggins and released on his fifth studio album Vox Humana (1985), four months prior to the McDonald version. Kenny Loggins' version has additional lyrics in the second verse and adds a "When everything fades away" bridge section.

Musicians

- Kenny Loggins – vocals
- Michael Omartian – keyboards, synthesizers
- Michael Landau – guitars
- Tim Pierce – guitar solo
