= If That's What It Takes (album) =

1982 album by Michael McDonald

Studio album by Michael McDonald
- Released: August 3, 1982
- Recorded: 1981–1982
- Studios: Warner Bros. Recording Studio (North Hollywood); Sunset Sound (Hollywood); Strings recorded at Ocean Way Recording (Hollywood)
- Genres: Pop rock; funk; blue-eyed soul
- Length: 39:59
- Label: Warner Bros.
- Producers: Ted Templeman; Lenny Waronker

Michael McDonald chronology
If That's What It Takes (1982)	No Lookin' Back (1985)

Singles from If That's What It Takes
- 1. "I Keep Forgettin' (Every Time You're Near)" Released: August 1982; 2. "I Gotta Try" Released: November 1982; 3. "Playin' by the Rules" Released: February 1983

Professional ratings
Review scores
Source	Rating
AllMusic	4.5/5 stars
Encyclopedia of Popular Music	4/5 stars
Rolling Stone	4/5 stars
The Village Voice	C+

If That's What It Takes is the debut solo album by the American musician Michael McDonald, released on August 3, 1982, by Warner Bros. Records. The album peaked at No. 6 on Billboard 200, while singles "I Keep Forgettin' (Every Time You're Near)" and "I Gotta Try" went to No. 4 and No. 44 on the Billboard Hot 100, respectively.

== Track listing ==
All tracks are written by Michael McDonald, with additional writers noted.

Side one
No.	Title	Writer(s)	Length
1.	"Playin' by the Rules"	Ed Sanford	4:55
2.	"I Keep Forgettin'"	Sanford; Jerry Leiber; Mike Stoller	3:39
3.	"Love Lies"	Randy Goodrum	3:21
4.	"I Gotta Try"	Kenny Loggins	3:53
5.	"I Can Let Go Now"		2:54

Side two
No.	Title	Writer(s)	Length
6.	"That's Why"	Goodrum	4:24
7.	"If That's What It Takes"	Jackie DeShannon	4:17
8.	"No Such Luck"	Grady Walker; Harry Garfield	3:44
9.	"Losin' End" ( (Note: A solo re-recording of the original from Takin' It to the Streets.))		4:11
10.	"Believe in It"		4:41
Total length:			39:59

== Personnel ==
=== Musicians ===
- Michael McDonald – lead vocals, backing vocals (1, 3, 4, 6–8, 10), Fender Rhodes (1–3, 7, 9, 10), synthesizers (1–4, 6–8, 10), piano (4–6, 8)
- Greg Phillinganes – piano (1, 3, 7, 10), Clavinet (2), Fender Rhodes (4), organ (9)
- Michael Boddicker – additional synthesizers (4)
- Michael Omartian – Fender Rhodes (6, 8)
- Dean Parks – guitar (1, 3, 7, 9), guitar overdubs (8)
- Steve Lukather – guitar (2, 4, 6, 8, 10)
- Robben Ford – guitar solo (6, 7)
- Willie Weeks – bass (1, 3, 4, 7, 9, 10)
- Louis Johnson – bass (2)
- Mike Porcaro – bass (6, 8)
- Steve Gadd – drums (1, 3, 4, 7, 9, 10)
- Jeff Porcaro – drums (2, 6, 8)
- Lenny Castro – percussion (1, 3, 6–8, 10)
- Bobby LaKind – percussion (1)
- Paulinho da Costa – percussion (3, 4)
- Ted Templeman – percussion (4)
- Edgar Winter – saxophone solo (1, 10), alto saxophone (8)
- Tom Scott – saxophone solo (6), Lyricon solo (9)
- Ed Sanford – backing vocals (1)
- Maureen McDonald – backing vocals (2, 6)
- Kenny Loggins – backing vocals (4)
- Christopher Cross – backing vocals (6)
- Brenda Russell – backing vocals (6)
- Kathy Walker – backing vocals (6)
- Amy Holland – backing vocals (6)
- Jerry Hey – horn arrangements
- Marty Paich – string arrangements

=== Technical ===
- Produced by Ted Templeman and Lenny Waronker
- Basic track engineers – Lee Herschberg (1, 3, 4, 7, 9, 10), Donn Landee (2), Jim Isaacson (5, 6, 8)
- Overdub engineers – Jim Isaacson, Donn Landee, Mark Linett, and Lee Herschberg
- Second engineers – Ken Deane and Steve McManus
- Mixdown engineer – Lee Herschberg
- Mastered by Bobby Hata at Warner Bros. Recording Studios
- Keyboard technician – Paul Medeiros
- Production coordinators – Joan Parker, Vicki Fortson, and Kathy Walker
- Photography – Jim Shea
- Art direction and design – Jeff Adamoff
- Direction – Irving Azoff and Front Line Management

== Charts ==
Chart (1982)	Peak position
Australia (Kent Music Report)	41
Canada Top Albums/CDs (RPM)	27
Norwegian Albums (VG-lista)	30
US Billboard 200	6
US Top R&B/Hip-Hop Albums (Billboard)	10
