= Motown Two =

Studio album by Michael McDonald
- Released: October 26, 2004
- Genre: Soul
- Length: 49:53
- Labels: Universal; Motown
- Producer: Simon Climie

Michael McDonald chronology
Motown (2003)	Motown Two (2004)	Soul Speak (2008)

Motown Two is the seventh solo studio album by American singer-songwriter Michael McDonald. The album was released on October 26, 2004, by Universal Music International and Motown.

== Critical reception ==
Professional ratings
Review scores
Source	Rating
AllMusic	4/5 stars
USA Today	2/4 stars

Stephen Thomas Erlewine from AllMusic wrote that "the album follows the same blueprint as the first record, offering highly polished, professionally produced, expertly performed interpretations of gems from the Motown vaults; it's the sound of young America in the '60s reinterpreted for the adults of the new millennium." USA Today felt that McDonald's "versions of "What's Going O" and "Mercy, Mercy Me" won't make anyone forget Marvin Gaye's, but his bouncy take on Smokey Robinson's "I Second That Emotion" is sure to please adult-contemporary fans who like their R&B served over easy."

== Track listing ==
No.	Title	Writer(s)	Originally recorded by	Length
1.	"You're All I Need to Get By"	Ashford & Simpson	Marvin Gaye and Tammi Terrell	3:32
2.	"I Was Made to Love Her"	Stevie Wonder; Sylvia Moy; Hank Cosby; Lula Mae Hardaway	Stevie Wonder	3:11
3.	"Reach Out, I'll Be There"	Holland–Dozier–Holland	The Four Tops	3:42
4.	"Stop, Look, Listen (To Your Heart)" (duet with Toni Braxton)	Thom Bell; Linda Creed	The Stylistics	3:49
5.	"Baby, I Need Your Lovin'"	Holland–Dozier–Holland	The Four Tops	3:19
6.	"Loving You Is Sweeter Than Ever"	Stevie Wonder; Ivy Jo Hunter	The Four Tops	3:37
7.	"The Tracks of My Tears"	Smokey Robinson; Warren "Pete" Moore; Marv Tarplin	Smokey Robinson and The Miracles	3:37
8.	"What's Going On"	Marvin Gaye; Al Cleveland; Renaldo Benson	Marvin Gaye	4:03
9.	"Second That Emotion"	Smokey Robinson; Al Cleveland	Smokey Robinson and The Miracles	3:30
10.	"After the Dance"	Marvin Gaye; Leon Ware	Marvin Gaye	3:43
11.	"Nowhere to Run"	Holland–Dozier–Holland	Martha Reeves & the Vandellas	3:13
12.	"Tuesday Heartbreak"	Stevie Wonder	Stevie Wonder	3:23
13.	"Mercy, Mercy Me (The Ecology)"	Marvin Gaye	Marvin Gaye	3:32
14.	"Baby, I'm for Real"	Marvin Gaye; Anna Gordy Gaye	The Originals	3:43

== Personnel ==
- Michael McDonald – lead and backing vocals, acoustic piano, arrangements
- Toby Baker – keyboards, programming, arrangements
- Tim Carmon – acoustic piano, Wurlitzer electric piano, synthesizers, organ
- Tony Swain – clavinet, synthesizers
- Billy Preston – Hammond organ
- Simon Climie – arrangements, programming, acoustic guitar, electric guitar, backing vocals
- Bernie Chiaravalle – nylon guitar
- Michael Thompson – guitar
- Abraham Laboriel – bass, acoustic guitar
- Nathan East – bass
- Vinnie Colaiuta – drums
- Abe Laboriel Jr. – drums
- Nicky Shaw – drums, percussion, programming, beats, arrangements
- Lenny Castro – percussion
- Stevie Wonder – harmonica (2)
- Fred Vigdor – alto saxophone
- Nick Ingman – string arrangements
- Gavyn Wright – orchestra leader
- Isobel Griffiths – orchestra contractor
- The London Session Orchestra – strings
- Toni Braxton – lead and backing vocals (4)
- Tamar Braxton – backing vocals
- Kendra Carr – backing vocals
- Steve Crawford – backing vocals
- Darwin Hobbs – backing vocals
- Mitchell John – backing vocals
- Lawrence Johnson – backing vocals
- Sherie Kibble – backing vocals
- Jay Malcomb – backing vocals
- Audrey Martells – backing vocals
- Kimberly Mont – backing vocals
- Racheal Oteh – backing vocals
- Shandra Penix – backing vocals
- Yvette Preyer – backing vocals
- Tiffany Ransom – backing vocals
- Drea Rheneé – backing vocals
- Kevin Whalum – backing vocals
- Sharon White – backing vocals

== Production ==
- Producer – Simon Climie
- Executive producer – Tony Swain
- Production coordinator – Lisa Patton and Debbie Johnson
- Engineers – Simon Climie, Alan Douglas, Shannon Forrest, Don Murray, Allen Sides and Grady Walker.
- Assistant engineers – Greg Burns, Tim Olmstead and Brian Vibbert.
- Pro Tools HD engineering – Simon Climie, Joel Everden and Jonathan Shakovskoy.
- Mixed by Mick Guzauski at Barking Doctor Recording (Mount Kisco, New York), assisted by Tom Bender.
- Mastered by Bob Ludwig at Gateway Mastering (Portland, Maine).
- Album coordinator – Dee Harrington

== Charts ==
Chart performance for Motown Two
Chart (2004)	Peak position
US Billboard 200	9
US Top R&B/Hip-Hop Albums (Billboard)	8
