= Lisa Patton =

American author

- Born: Memphis, Tennessee, U.S.
- Education: Hutchison School; University of Alabama (BA)
- Occupation: Author
- Website: www.lisapatton.com

Lisa Patton is an American author.

Born and raised in Memphis, Tennessee, Patton attended an all-girls college preparatory school, the Hutchison School, from kindergarten through twelfth grade. She received a Bachelor of Arts degree in Communications from the University of Alabama in 1980, where she was a member of the Zeta chapter of Kappa Delta.

In her first novel, Whistlin' Dixie in a Nor'Easter, Leelee Satterfield moves with her husband Baker from her home in Memphis to Vermont, where they buy and run an inn. Leelee adjusts to life in the North and learns to be more independent.

Her second novel, Yankee Doodle Dixie, follows Leelee back to Memphis, where she meets a rock star and follows him to New York City.

Her third novel, Southern as a Second Language is the final in what Library Journal calls "the beloved Dixie Series."

Her fourth novel, Rush, is set on the Ole Miss campus.

In addition to writing, Patton is an event speaker.

== Bibliography ==
- Whistlin' Dixie in a Nor'Easter, St. Martin’s Press, 2009
- Yankee Doodle Dixie, St. Martin’s Press, 2011
- Southern as a Second Language, St. Martin's Press, 2013
- RUSH, St. Martin's Press, 2018
