= Running Scared (1986 film) =

1986 film by Peter Hyams

- Theatrical poster
- Directed by: Peter Hyams
- Screenplay by: Gary DeVore; Jimmy Huston
- Story by: Gary DeVore
- Produced by: David Foster; Lawrence Turman
- Starring: Gregory Hines; Billy Crystal; Steven Bauer
- Cinematography: Peter Hyams
- Edited by: James Mitchell
- Music by: Rod Temperton
- Production companies: Metro-Goldwyn-Mayer; The Turman-Foster Company
- Distributed by: MGM Entertainment Co.
- Release date: June 27, 1986
- Running time: 107 minutes
- Country: United States
- Language: English
- Box office: $38,500,726 (USA)

Running Scared is a 1986 American buddy cop action comedy film shot and directed by Peter Hyams, and written by Gary Devore and Jimmy Huston. It stars Gregory Hines and Billy Crystal as two Chicago police officers who attempt to bring down a drug dealer before they retire.

The film was released by MGM Entertainment Co. on June 27, 1986. It received mixed reviews, with praise for the performances of Hines and Crystal, but criticism for its mix of action and comedy, and grossed over $38 million.

== Plot ==
Ray Hughes and Danny Costanzo are two police officers working on Chicago's North Side, known for their wisecracking demeanors and unorthodox police methods, which get results in their various cases. One such case involves trying to bust up-and-coming drug dealer Julio Gonzales when they discovered he was released from prison. After arresting Snake, one of Gonzales's associates, they convince him to wear a wire in order to get the necessary evidence to put Gonzales away. When they approach the meeting place (a cargo ship) they find that Gonzales has acquired a large store of Israeli Uzi submachine guns. Snake is setting the detectives up, however, prompting the detectives to rush in by acting as though Gonzales was preparing to kill him. Gonzales reveals his ambition to be the Spanish "Godfather" of Chicago, but chastises Snake for letting the detectives get close, and Snake is shot dead by a subordinate. The pair look as though they will be killed, but two undercover detectives in Gonzales's gang step in to make the arrest. In the ensuing gun battle, most of the gang escape, but Ray and Danny capture Gonzales.

Back at the station Ray and Danny expect to be praised, but instead their captain chastises them for their sloppy work (as revealed by Snake's wire) and orders them to take a vacation. On vacation in Key West, the pair develop a fondness for the laid-back and enjoyable atmosphere, and begin to question their career choice after the experience; when they discuss life after being cops, they decide to retire and open a bar.

When they return to Chicago and inform the captain of their intentions, they find out that Gonzales has been released and is free on bail. Incensed, they vow to capture Gonzales before retiring, but by being a little more careful in the process, requisitioning bulletproof vests they never considered before. To add insult to injury, Captain Logan assigns them the additional task of training their replacements before they go. They must train detectives Anthony Montoya and Frank Sigliano, none other than the two undercover officers who saved them from being killed in the Gonzales bust; Logan wants them to replace Ray and Danny as "the best of the worst."

During one of the attempts to capture Gonzales, Ray and Danny confiscate a large shipment of cocaine coming from Colombia. To get it back, Gonzales kidnaps Danny's ex-wife Anna, whom he still loves and has been trying to reconcile with, and says he will trade her for his drugs; otherwise, he will kill her. Danny agrees, leading to the final confrontation inside the high-rise atrium of the State of Illinois Center. During the ensuing fight, Danny and Ray rescue their would-be protégés in a way similar to their own rescuing, and Gonzales is killed. Anna and Danny reconcile and he and Ray decide not to retire after all.

== Cast ==
- Gregory Hines as Ray Hughes
- Billy Crystal as Danny Costanzo
- Steven Bauer as Frank
- Darlanne Fluegel as Anna Costanzo
- Joe Pantoliano as Snake
- Dan Hedaya as Captain Logan
- Jimmy Smits as Julio Gonzales
- Jonathan Gries as Tony
- Tracy Reed as Maryann Thomas
- Larry Hankin as Ace

== Production ==
In 2010, Hyams recalled that he had wanted "to remain earthbound" and desired a comedy that was "not stupid" and where the action was not "mean-spirited or bloody or graphic." MGM's script about retiring New York cops turned into a tale of non-retiring young Chicago cops, offering fresh casting possibilities and a unique city backdrop. He noted that amidst numerous cop movies, he chose to opt for more unconventional actors and chose Billy Crystal and Gregory Hines, who proved to have great chemistry.

Hines persistently campaigned for his role, proud that the film featured a "black guy [with] sex scenes," deviating from the norm of the black character being devoid of sexuality, as opposed to his white counterpart. He recalled that Hyams was "tough to work with" but that he didn't want to "put the guy down." Crystal, valued for his improvisational skills, contributed "little pearls" to the script, supported by Hines' chemistry. He noted that his risky improvisations were only possible due to Hines' solid presence.

Filming spanned September 1985 to January 1986 across MGM Studios in Culver City, California, in addition to location work in Key West, and Chicago.

== Reception ==
Running Scared was a moderate box office success, earning over $38 million. Reviews were mixed, however, and the film has a current 64% rating on Rotten Tomatoes, based on 25 reviews. The site's consensus states: "Running Scared struggles to strike a consistent balance between violent action and humor, but the chemistry between its well-matched leads keeps things entertaining." Film critic Roger Ebert recommended it, saying that the film "transcends its dreary roots and turns out to be a lot of fun".

Vincent Canby of The New York Times, however, advised people to "stay home and watch Miami Vice or Cagney and Lacey" instead.

=== Box office ===
The film debuted at #5 at the U.S. box office, with a weekend gross of $5,227,757, with a total gross of $38.5 million. It was the 26th highest grossing movie of 1986.

== Soundtrack ==
Running Scared

Soundtrack album by Various Artists
- Released: 1986
- Genre: R&B
- Length: 43:04
- Label: MCA
- Producers: Rod Temperton, Dick Rudolph, and Bruce Swedien

The Running Scared soundtrack was released in conjunction with the movie and contained a mix of songs and music featured in the film. The album sold well and produced three top 15 hits with performances by Klymaxx, Michael McDonald, New Edition, and Patti LaBelle. Producer Rod Temperton also contributed two songs with his band The Rod Temperton Beat Wagon.

Nik Kershaw wrote his song "Running Scared" for the movie soundtrack, however it was turned down for reasons unknown. The song appears on Kershaw's third studio album Radio Musicola.

=== Track listing ===
| No. | Title | Writer(s) | Performer | Length |
|---|---|---|---|---|
| 1. | "Man Size Love" | Rod Temperton | Klymaxx | 4:15 |
| 2. | "Sweet Freedom" | Temperton | Michael McDonald | 7:38 |
| 3. | "I Just Wanna Be Loved" | Temperton | Ready for the World | 4:55 |
| 4. | "Running Scared" | Temperton | Fee Waybill | 4:31 |
| 5. | "Once in a Lifetime Groove" | Christine Perren, Freddie Perren, Ric Wyatt Jr. | New Edition | 4:05 |
| 6. | "I Know What I Want" | Artie Ray Kimble, Howie Rice, Budd Ellison | Patti LaBelle | 3:56 |
| 7. | "Say You Really Want Me" | Danny Sembello, Donnell Spencer Jr., Dick Rudolph | Kim Wilde | 4:31 |
| 8. | "El Chase [Instrumental] (featuring Larry Williams)" | Temperton, Williams, Jim Flamberg | The Rod Temperton Beat Wagon | 5:33 |
| 9. | "Never Too Late to Start (featuring Tommy Funderburk)" | Temperton | The Rod Temperton Beat Wagon | 4:11 |

=== Singles chart positions ===
| Year | Single | Chart | Position |
|---|---|---|---|
| 1986 | Man Size Love | Billboard Hot 100 | 15 |
| 1986 | Once in a Lifetime Groove | Dance Music/Club Play | 9 |
| 1986 | Once in a Lifetime Groove | Hot Dance Music/Maxi-Singles Sales | 10 |
| 1986 | Once in a Lifetime Groove | Hot Black Singles | 10 |
| 1986 | Sweet Freedom | Adult Contemporary | 4 |
| 1986 | Sweet Freedom | Billboard Hot 100 | 7 |
| 1986 | Sweet Freedom | Hot Black Singles | 17 |
| 1987 | Say You Really Want Me | Billboard Hot 100 | 44 |

=== Album chart position ===
| Year | Album | Chart | Position |
|---|---|---|---|
| 1986 | Running Scared | R&B Albums | 38 |
| 1986 | Running Scared | Billboard 200 | 43 |

== See also ==
- List of American films of 1986
