= Michael McDonald (musician) =

American musician and producer (born 1952)

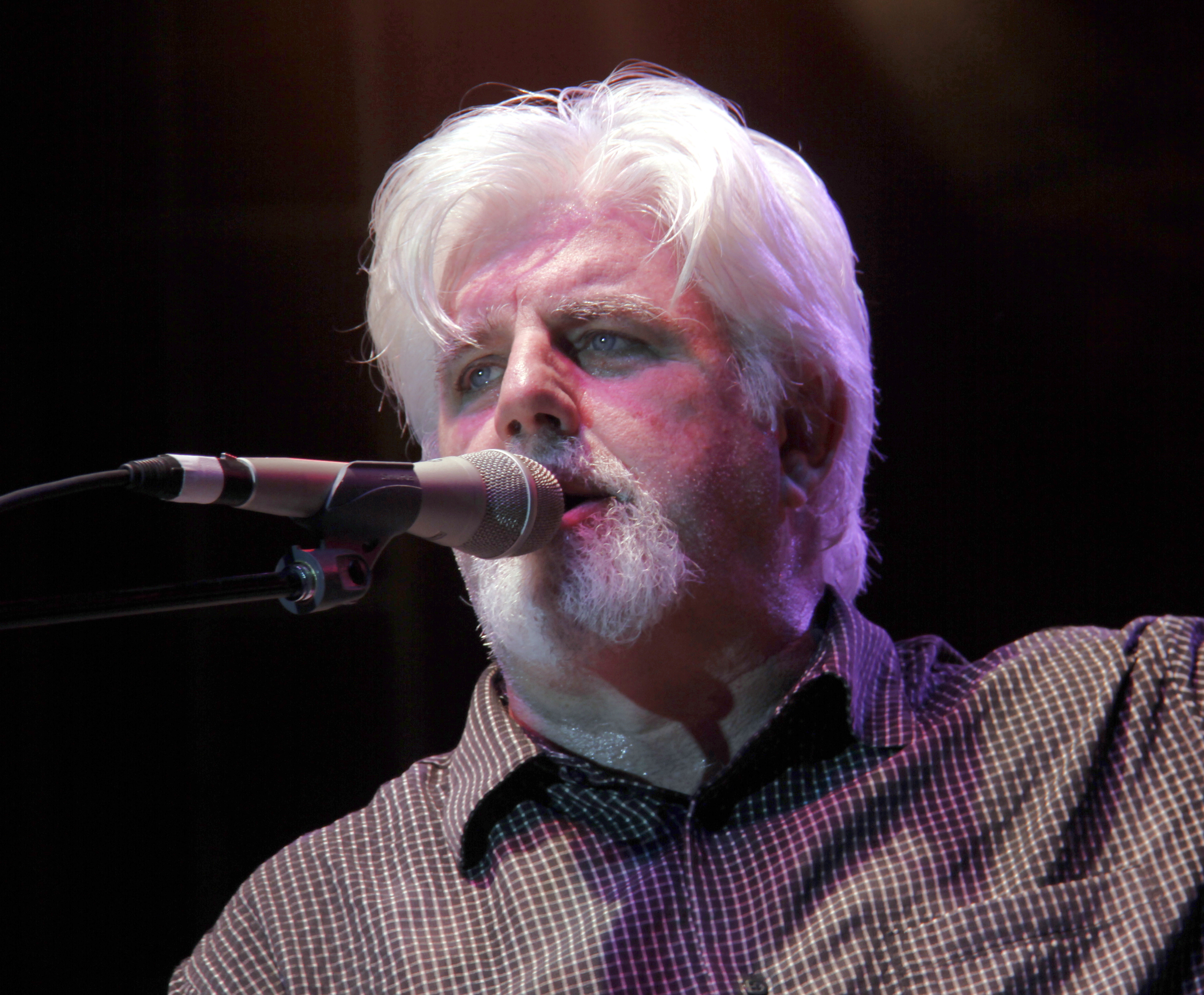
- McDonald performing in 2011
- Born: Michael Hanley McDonald; February 12, 1952 (age 74); Ferguson, Missouri, U.S.
- Occupations: Musician; singer; songwriter; record producer
- Years active: 1973–present
- Spouse: Amy Holland (m. 1983)
- Children: 3
- Musical career
- Genres: Blue-eyed soul; R&B; pop; rock; yacht rock; soft rock
- Instruments: Vocals; keyboards
- Labels: Warner Bros.; Reprise; Ramp; Universal; Motown
- Member of: The Doobie Brothers
- Formerly of: Steely Dan; the New York Rock and Soul Revue; the Dukes of September
- Website: michaelmcdonald.com

Michael Hanley McDonald (born February 12, 1952) is an American singer, keyboardist, and songwriter. Known for his distinctively soulful voice, he was a frequent collaborator with the group Steely Dan from 1973 to 1980, rising to fame in 1975 as lead vocalist/keyboardist of the Doobie Brothers, with whom he has performed across three stints (1975–1982, 1987, 2019–present). McDonald wrote and sang several hit songs with the Doobie Brothers, including "Takin' It to the Streets", "It Keeps You Runnin'", "What a Fool Believes", "Minute by Minute", and "Real Love". McDonald has also performed as a prominent backing vocalist on numerous recordings by artists including Toto, Christopher Cross, and Kenny Loggins.

McDonald's solo career consists of nine studio albums and a number of singles, including the 1982 hit "I Keep Forgettin' (Every Time You're Near)". During his career, McDonald has collaborated with a number of other artists, including James Ingram, David Cassidy, Van Halen, Carly Simon, Patti LaBelle, Twinkie Clark, Lee Ritenour, the Winans, Aretha Franklin, Grizzly Bear, Joni Mitchell, and Thundercat. He has also recorded for television and film soundtracks. McDonald is the recipient of five Grammy Awards, and was inducted into the Rock and Roll Hall of Fame as a member of the Doobie Brothers in 2020. McDonald was inducted into the Songwriters Hall of Fame in 2025.

== Early life ==
Michael Hanley McDonald was born on February 12, 1952, in the St. Louis suburb of Ferguson, Missouri. He is of Irish Catholic ancestry. McDonald attended McCluer High School, where he played in local bands, including Mike and the Majestics, Jerry Jay and the Sheratons, the Reeb-Toors/Younger Brothers and the Guild. In 1970, while playing with a band called Blue, he was discovered in an Illinois night club by RCA staff producer Rick Jarrard, who offered him a record contract and brought him to Los Angeles.

== Career ==
=== Steely Dan ===
McDonald became a member of Steely Dan's touring band in 1974, performing Wurlitzer electric piano and vocals; he took the lead vocals on "Show Biz Kids" and the final verse of "Pretzel Logic", and shared the lead with the band's other two lead vocalists on "Bodhisattva". He recalled in a 2016 interview:

I literally threw my piano in the back of my Pinto and drove down to where they were rehearsing and auditioned. Remarkably I got the gig, not because of my keyboard playing but because I could sing all the high parts. I could tell that that appealed to Donald (Fagen)—'cause I could sing like a girl.

At the end of McDonald's first tour with them, Steely Dan was retired as a live act. McDonald then became one of the many in-studio adjunct members of the band, providing backing vocals on tracks for 1975's Katy Lied. Steely Dan biographer Anthony Robustelli assessed that for most people, the entrance of McDonald's backing vocal on "Bad Sneakers" (which occurs on the second instance of the lyric "going insane") is the most memorable part of the song. He appeared on subsequent Steely Dan recordings, including 1976's The Royal Scam, 1977's Aja, and 1980's Gaucho.

In 2006, he rejoined Steely Dan on the band's summer tour, both as the opening act and as part of the band.

=== The Doobie Brothers ===
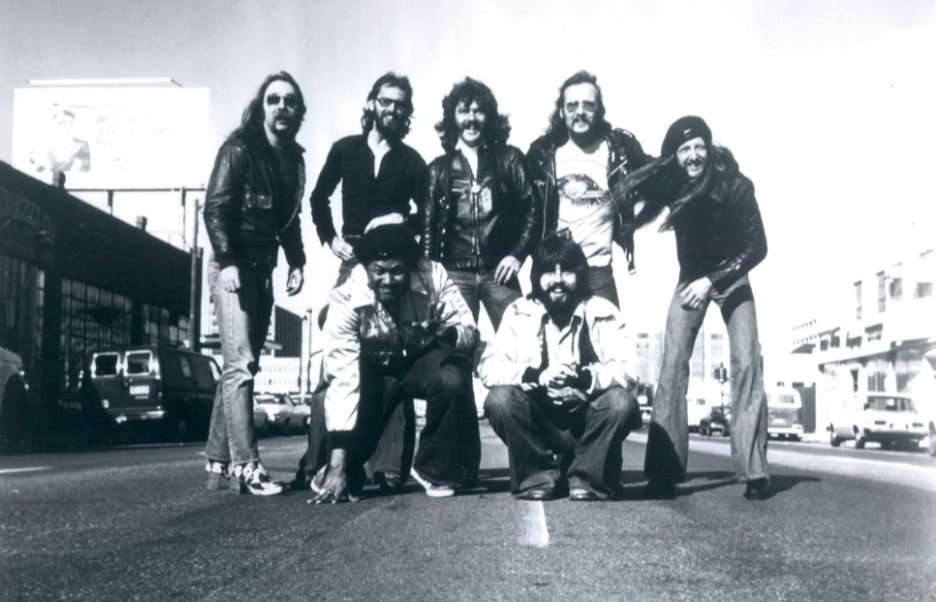
McDonald (right, crouching) with the Doobie Brothers, 1976

McDonald was recruited by the Doobie Brothers in April 1975, initially as a temporary replacement for their lead vocalist Tom Johnston after he became ill during a national tour. McDonald's work with the band proved successful so they decided to retain him as a full-time member.

As a member of the Doobie Brothers, McDonald sang lead vocals on some of the band's best-known songs, such as "Real Love", "Takin' It to the Streets", "Little Darling (I Need You)", "It Keeps You Runnin'", "Minute by Minute", and "What a Fool Believes" (which became a number-one single in the U.S. and earned him a 1980 Grammy Award for Song of the Year along with co-writer Kenny Loggins).

At the same time, McDonald appeared as a session vocalist and keyboardist for various artists, including Christopher Cross, Stephen Bishop, Jack Jones, Bonnie Raitt, the band Toto, and Kenny Loggins. McDonald co-wrote "You Belong to Me" with Carly Simon, which is on the Doobie Brothers' studio album Livin' on the Fault Line (1977).

McDonald has reunited as a guest performer with the Doobie Brothers several times since the band's initial dissolution in 1982. He reteamed with them for the track "Don't Say Goodbye" on the band's thirteenth studio album, World Gone Crazy (2010). In March 2014, he reunited with the band to record a new album featuring the greatest hits of their 40-plus-year career. This project was completed in conjunction with Sony Music Nashville. On the album, McDonald shares lead vocals with Sara Evans for "What a Fool Believes", the duo Love and Theft for "Takin' It to the Streets", and Amanda Sudano-Ramirez for "You Belong to Me." The album titled Southbound was released on November 4, 2014, as the Doobie Brothers' fourteenth studio album.

On November 5, 2014, McDonald and the Doobie Brothers were featured musical guests on the 47th annual Country Music Association Awards to celebrate the release of Southbound. They were joined by Hunter Hayes, Jennifer Nettles, and Hillary Scott in their performance of "Listen to the Music". At the end of the awards ceremony, they were also joined by host Brad Paisley for "Takin' It to the Streets".

=== Solo career ===
After the Doobie Brothers' first farewell tour, McDonald released his first solo studio album, If That's What It Takes, in 1982, on the Warner Bros. label. The album featured the hit singles "I Keep Forgettin' (Every Time You're Near)" and "I Gotta Try", the latter co-written with Kenny Loggins, who also recorded it that same year for his fourth album High Adventure.

He continued to collaborate with other artists during this period. McDonald co-wrote Van Halen's top-20 hit "I'll Wait", from their biggest-selling album 1984. "Yah Mo B There", a duet with James Ingram, won the 27th Annual Grammy for Best R&B Performance by a Duo or Group with Vocals. In 1985, he released his second studio album No Lookin' Back, his first time co-producing an album. He also wrote or co-wrote all of the tracks and featured a minor hit with the title track, cowritten by Kenny Loggins. By June 1986, the album had met with little success, but McDonald then had a huge boost with the release of the single "Sweet Freedom", which appeared on the soundtrack to the Billy Crystal and Gregory Hines film Running Scared, and was McDonald's last top-10 hit on the Billboard Hot 100 chart. The No Lookin' Back album was then re-released in some markets with the new hit single included, as well as a few songs remixed. The single "On My Own", a duet with Patti LaBelle, reached number one on the U.S. charts in 1986. Mid that year, he performed as a backing vocalist on the rock band Toto's studio album Fahrenheit, appearing on the hit single "I'll Be Over You" and its accompanying video. On August 22, 1986, McDonald appeared in an episode of The Young and the Restless. Later that year, he provided backing vocals on the Wang Chung song "A Fool and His Money" from their studio album Mosaic. In 1987, McDonald did a featured collaboration, titled "Love Has No Color", with gospel quartet the Winans from their studio album Decisions.

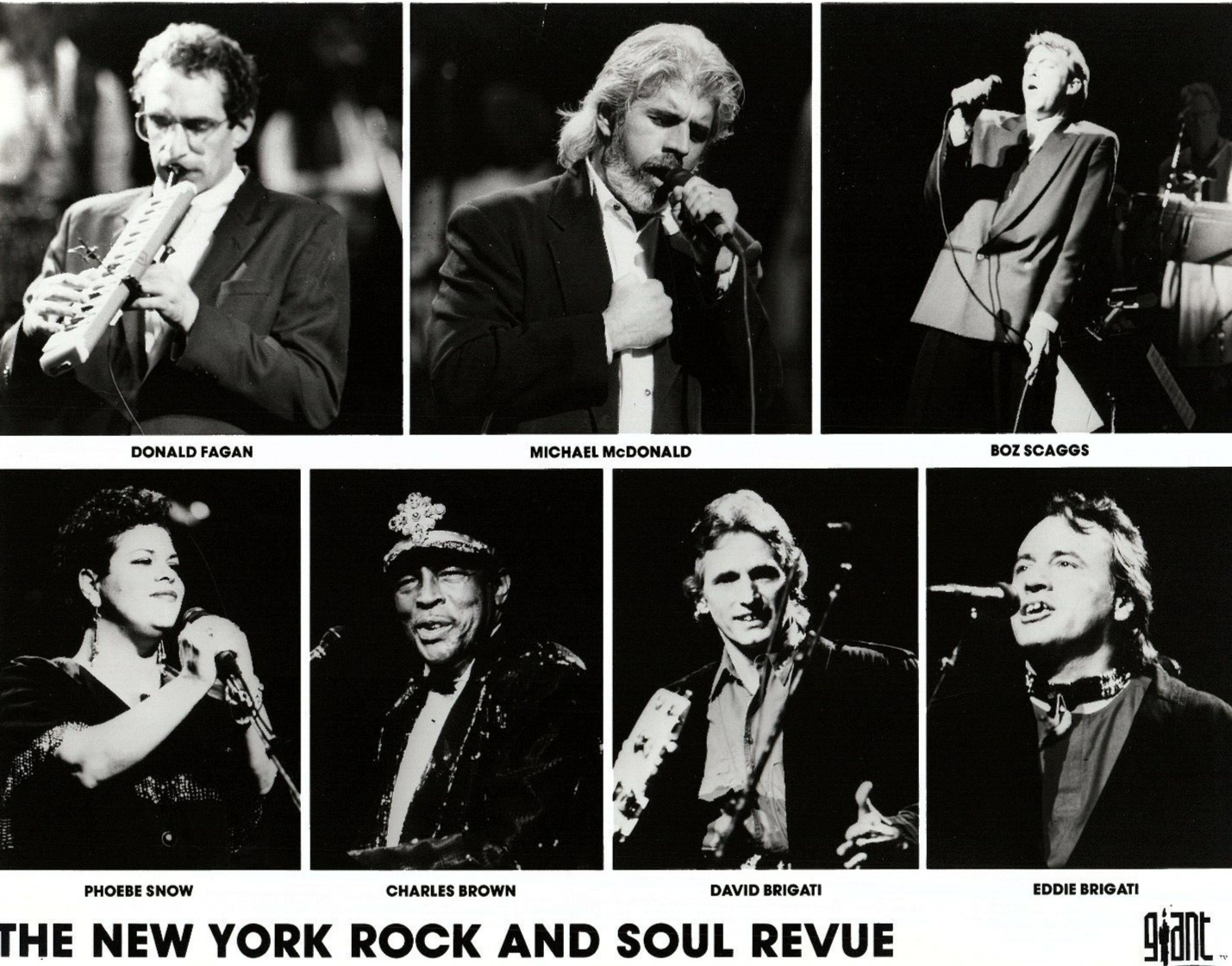
1991 Giant Records promotional image for The New York Rock and Soul Revue

In 1990, McDonald released his third studio album, Take It to Heart, which featured a minor hit with the title track, co-written by Diane Warren. The following year, he joined the New York Rock and Soul Revue, put together by Steely Dan's lead vocalist Donald Fagen and featuring other artists such as Boz Scaggs and Phoebe Snow. In 1991, he released the single "Ever Changing Times", a duet with Aretha Franklin.

In 1999, McDonald recorded the song "Eyes of a Child", a comedic ballad written by Trey Parker, and also provided the high note singing vocals for Satan in the South Park: Bigger, Longer & Uncut soundtrack. It was also used at the ending credits for the movie. The same year, he sang backing vocals on the Warren Brothers' single "Better Man", from their studio album Beautiful Day in the Cold Cruel World. He also provided lead vocals for one of three studio tracks on Chicago XXVI: Live in Concert.

In 2003, McDonald earned two Grammy nominations for his sixth studio album Motown, a tribute to the Motown sound. A year later, Motown Two was released. Music critic Stephen Thomas Erlewine stated, "The album follows the same blueprint as the first record, offering highly polished, professionally produced, expertly performed interpretations of gems from the Motown vaults."

In 2000, McDonald, along with partners Chris Pelonis and actor Jeff Bridges, founded the independent recording label Ramp. On May 11, 2003, McDonald was inducted into the St. Louis Walk of Fame. McDonald recorded a duet with Ray Charles on Charles' final studio album Genius Loves Company (2004). In 2007, McDonald helped judge the sixth annual Independent Music Awards. In 2006, McDonald sang as a guest singer in the jazz quartet Fourplay from the studio album X, in a cover of Steve Winwood's song "My Love's Leavin'".

In 2008, McDonald released his studio album Soul Speak, which includes three new songs penned by McDonald, and covers of songs originally made famous by Dionne Warwick ("Walk On By"), Stevie Wonder ("Living for the City"), Van Morrison ("Into the Mystic"), Tyrone Davis ("Baby Can I Change My Mind"), and others. In 2009, McDonald along with the West Angeles COGIC Mass Choir, released the song "Storm Before the Calm" on the compilation album Oh Happy Day. McDonald also contributed an alternate lead vocal track for the 7-inch single "While You Wait for the Others", by the indie rock band Grizzly Bear.

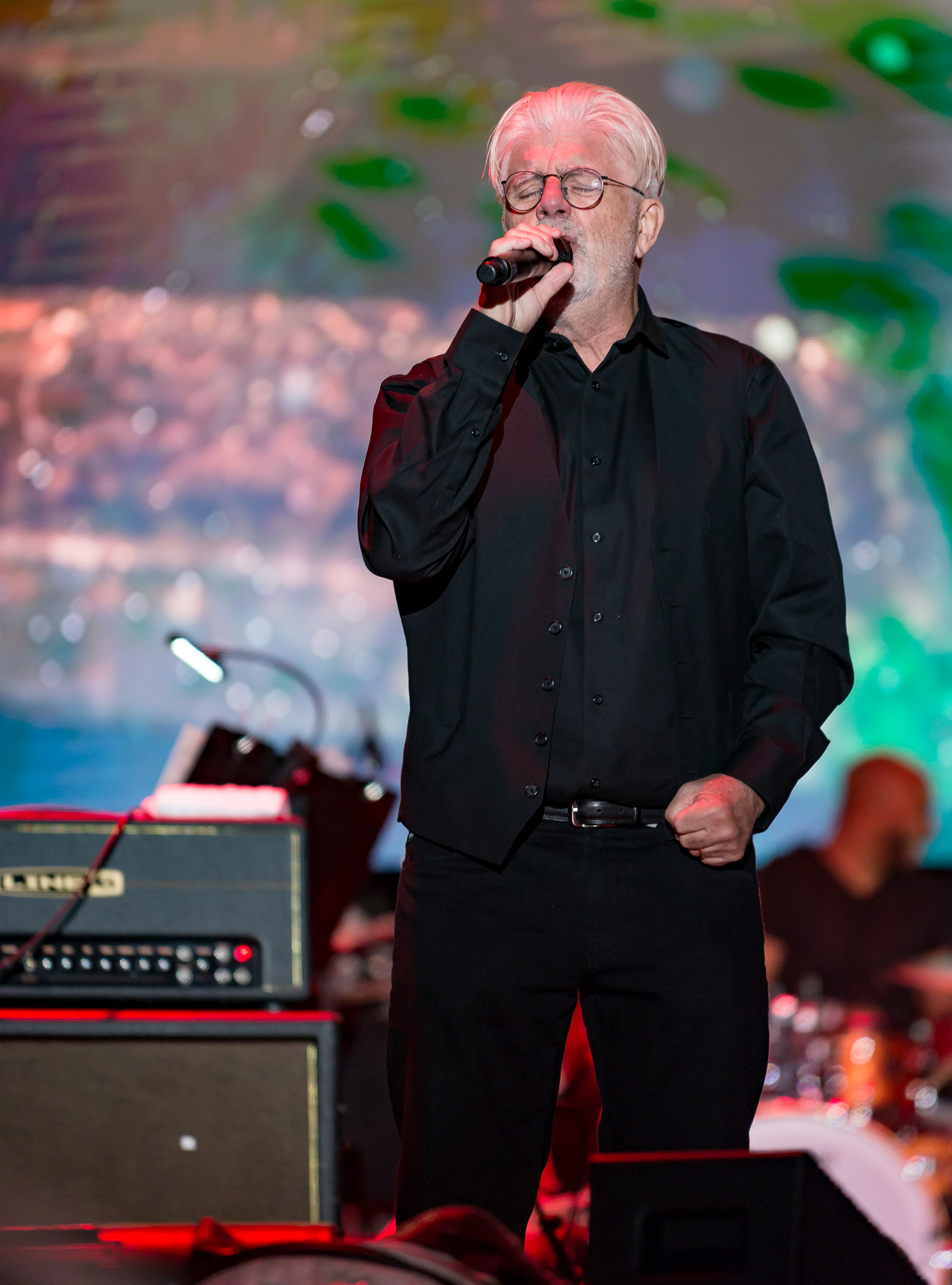
McDonald performing in 2018

In December 2009, McDonald donated his performance to Keep the Beat in Santa Barbara, California, where he played to a capacity crowd at the newly renovated Granada Theater. Harry Rabin, producer and head of Keep the Beat, an initiative of the Santa Barbara Education Foundation, produced the show, including two video productions, and worked with student choral groups from primary and secondary schools as well as a brass section so they could perform in the show with McDonald and his band.

In 2009, McDonald appeared on the satirical television sitcom 30 Rock as one of the benefit singers in the season finale episode "Kidney Now!". McDonald performed the national anthem before the Tostitos Fiesta Bowl between the Boise State Broncos and TCU Horned Frogs at the University of Phoenix Stadium on January 4, 2010, in Glendale, Arizona. McDonald sang "Takin' It to the Streets" on the American Idol season nine finale, in 2010.

In 2010, McDonald teamed up again with Donald Fagen and Boz Scaggs, to form the Dukes of September. In June 2012, the supergroup performed on Late Night with Jimmy Fallon to promote their tour. The group also played at Lincoln Center, a performance which was then broadcast as a PBS special and later released on DVD.

In 2013, McDonald settled a $500,000 breach-of-contract suit (out of court) with Warner Music over underpayment of royalties of online sales. In the summer of 2014, he co-headlined a U.S. tour with the rock band Toto. In 2017, McDonald was featured together with Kenny Loggins on Thundercat's single "Show You the Way", included on the latter's album Drunk. In June 2017, McDonald, Loggins and Thundercat performed the song together on The Tonight Show Starring Jimmy Fallon.

In 2018, he appeared as a guest vocalist on the song "What the World Needs Now" on Barbra Streisand's thirty-sixth studio album Walls. In 2021, McDonald was featured on "The Best of Me", from Toad the Wet Sprocket's seventh studio album, Starting Now. In 2024, McDonald contributed background vocals to "No Lie" on Lalah Hathaway's album, VANTABLACK. In 2026, McDonald duetted with Keith Urban on the track "We Go Back" from Urban's album Flow State. Later that year, McDonald was featured in the opening track to the soundtrack album of Grand Theft Auto VI, "Starting From Zero", composed by French electronic music duo Justice. He also voiced the character Skipper McD, a radio host, in the video game.

== Personal life ==
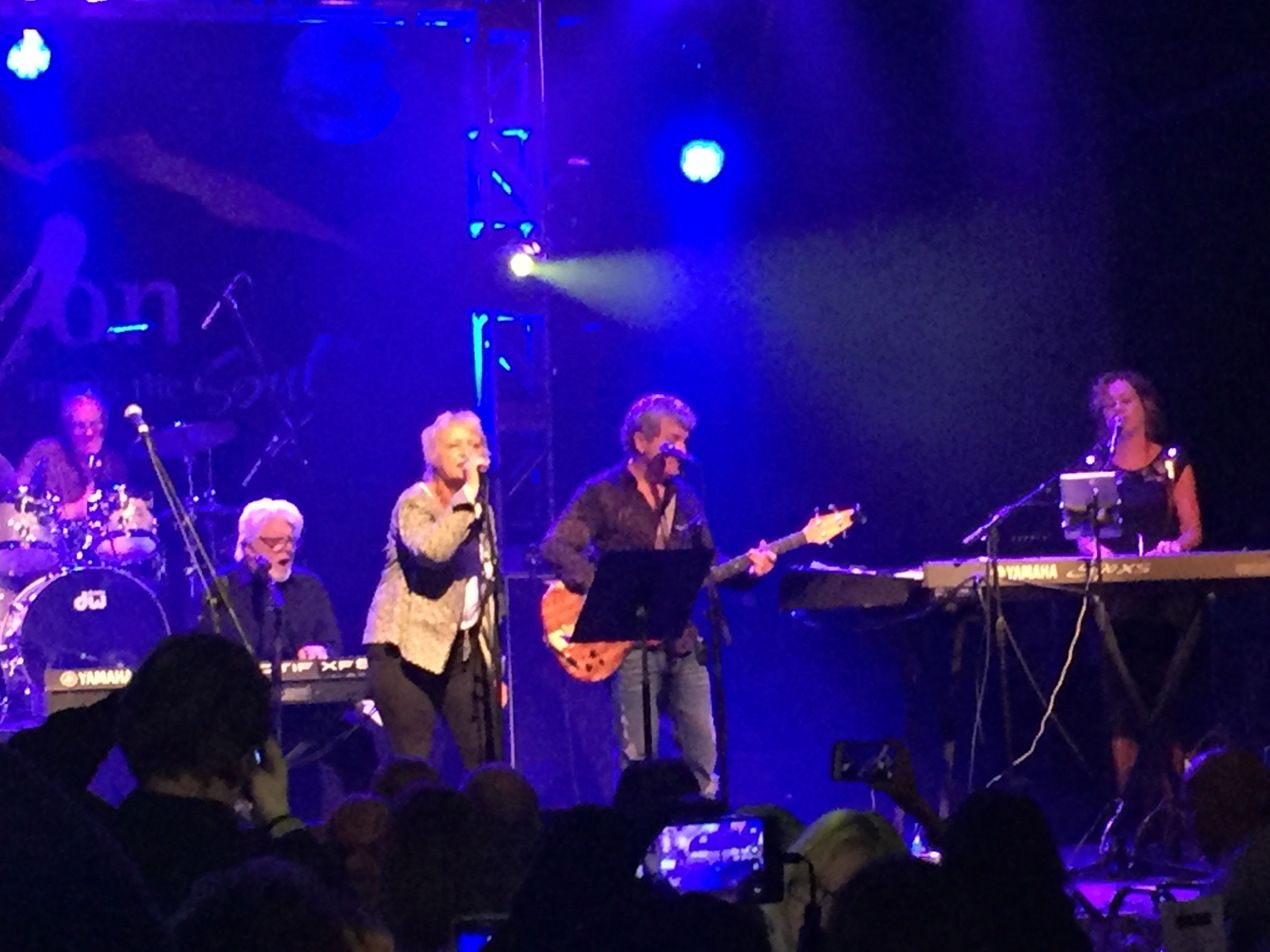
McDonald performing with his wife and fellow singer Amy Holland and Ambrosia in 2016

McDonald has been married to singer Amy Holland since 1983. They have two children. He moved with his family to Santa Barbara in the late 1990s, and later lived in Nashville.

In eighth grade, McDonald and his then-girlfriend conceived a child. Following pressure to give the child up for adoption, the boy was adopted and raised in St. Louis as Michael Goessling. Goessling discovered his parentage in 2025 when one of McDonald's other children took a consumer DNA test.

== Discography ==
=== With Steely Dan ===
- Katy Lied (1975)
- The Royal Scam (1976)
- Aja (1977)
- Gaucho (1980)

=== With the Doobie Brothers ===
- Takin' It to the Streets (1976)
- Livin' on the Fault Line (1977)
- Minute by Minute (1978)
- One Step Closer (1980)
- Cycles (1989) – Co-writing credit on "Tonight I'm Coming Through (The Border)".
- World Gone Crazy (2010) – Guest vocals on "Don't Say Goodbye".
- Southbound (2014)
- Walk This Road (2025)

=== Solo ===
- If That's What It Takes (1982)
- No Lookin' Back (1985)
- Take It to Heart (1990)
- Blink of an Eye (1993)
- Blue Obsession (2000)
- In the Spirit: A Christmas Album (2001)
- Motown (2003)
- Motown Two (2004)
- Through the Many Winters, A Christmas Album (2005)
- Soul Speak (2008)
- This Christmas (2009)
- Wide Open (2017)

== Touring band members ==
- Michael McDonald – lead vocals, piano, rhythm guitar
- Bernie Chiaravalle – lead and rhythm guitars, backing vocals
- Pat Coil – keyboards
- Mark Douthit – saxophone, keyboards
- Jacob Lowery – bass guitar, harmonica, backing vocals
- Dan Needham – drums
- Drea Rheneé – backing and co-lead vocals, tambourine
- Amy Holland – vocals

== Awards and honors ==
Grammy Awards
Year	Category	Nominated work	Result
1979	Record of the Year	"What a Fool Believes" (The Doobie Brothers)	Won
1979	Song of the Year	"What a Fool Believes" (co-written with Kenny Loggins)	Won
1979	Song of the Year	"Minute by Minute" (co-written with Lester Abrams)	Nominated
1979	Album of the Year	Minute by Minute (The Doobie Brothers)	Nominated
1979	Best Pop Vocal Performance by a Duo, Group or Chorus	"Minute by Minute" (The Doobie Brothers)	Won
1979	Best Arrangement Accompanying Vocals	"What a Fool Believes"	Won
1982	Best Pop Vocal Performance – Male	"I Keep Forgettin' (Every Time You're Near)"	Nominated
1984	Best R&B Performance by a Duo or Group with Vocal	"Yah Mo B There" (with James Ingram)	Won
1984	Best R&B Song	"Yah Mo B There" (with James Ingram, Rod Temperton, and Quincy Jones)	Nominated
1986	Best Pop Vocal Performance – Male	"Sweet Freedom"	Nominated
1986	Best Pop Vocal Performance by a Duo or Group	"On My Own" (with Patti LaBelle)	Nominated
2003	Best Pop Vocal Performance – Male	"Ain't No Mountain High Enough"	Nominated
2003	Best Pop Vocal Album	Motown	Nominated

In May 2011, McDonald was awarded an Honorary Doctorate of Music from Berklee College of Music. In May 2026, McDonald was awarded an honorary Doctorate of Fine Arts from Washington University in St. Louis.

== Books ==
- McDonald, Michael; Reiser, Paul (May 21, 2024). What a Fool Believes: A Memoir. New York: Del Street Books. ISBN 9780063357563. OCLC 1395422413.
