= Soul Speak =

Studio album by Michael McDonald
- Released: March 4, 2008
- Genre: Soul
- Length: 56:46
- Labels: Universal; Motown
- Producer: Simon Climie

Michael McDonald chronology
Motown Two (2004)	Soul Speak (2008)	This Christmas (2009)

Professional ratings
Review scores
Source	Rating
AllMusic	3.5/5 stars
USA Today	3/4 stars

Soul Speak is the eighth solo studio album by American singer-songwriter Michael McDonald. The album was released on March 4, 2008, by Universal Music International and Motown.

== Track listing ==
No.	Title	Writer(s)	Length
1.	"I Knew You Were Waiting (For Me)"	Dennis Morgan; Simon Climie	4:04
2.	"Living for the City"	Stevie Wonder	4:59
3.	"Love T.K.O."	Linda Womack	4:58
4.	"Walk On By"	Burt Bacharach; Hal David	2:46
5.	"Still Not Over You (Getting Over Me)"	Dennis Morgan; Simon Climie; Michael McDonald	3:57
6.	"For Once in My Life"	Orlando Murden; Ronald Miller	3:39
7.	"Into the Mystic"	Van Morrison	4:11
8.	"Hallelujah"	Leonard Cohen	4:59
9.	"Enemy Within"	Simon Climie; Michael McDonald	4:05
10.	"(Your Love Keeps Lifting Me) Higher and Higher"	Carl Smith; Gary Jackson; Raynard Miner	3:02
11.	"Only God Can Help Me Now"	Michael McDonald	4:59
12.	"Baby Can I Change My Mind"	Barry Despenza; Carl Wolfolk	3:42
13.	"Redemption Song"	Bob Marley	3:56
14.	"You Don't Know Me"	Cindy Walker; Eddy Arnold	3:12

== Personnel ==
- Michael McDonald – lead vocals, acoustic piano (1, 8), backing vocals (3, 4), keyboards (4–7, 9–12), guitar (7)
- Toby Baker – keyboards (1–3, 5–8, 10–14), synthesizers (3), synthesizer programming (4)
- Tim Carmon – organ, acoustic piano (10)
- Tim Lauer – accordion (7)
- Doyle Bramhall II – guitars (1, 7–10, 12)
- Michael Thompson – guitars (1–7, 10–14), sitar (5)
- Nathan East – bass guitar
- Nicky Shaw – drums (1–3, 5–7, 9–14), percussion (1–3, 5–7, 9–14), arrangements (4, 11)
- Abe Laboriel Jr. – drums (1–3, 5, 6, 8, 10, 12–14)
- Vinnie Colaiuta – drums (7, 9)
- Stevie Wonder – harmonica (6)
- Simon Climie – arrangements
- Nick Ingman – string arrangements and conductor (3, 6)
- Isobel Griffiths – orchestra contractor (3, 6)
- Gavyn Wright – orchestra leader (3, 6)
- The Kick Horns – brass section (6, 7, 10)
- Michelle John Douglas – backing vocals (1, 2, 5, 6, 10, 12, 13)
- Rachel Oteh – backing vocals (1, 2, 10, 13)
- Drea Rheneé – backing vocals (1–3, 5, 6, 10, 13)
- Sharon White – backing vocals (1, 2, 5, 6, 10, 12, 13)
- Out for Souls Choir – choir (1, 2, 5, 10)
- Denise Allen – backing vocals (3, 6)
- Calvin Nowell – backing vocals (3, 6)
- Debi Selby – backing vocals (3)
- Aubrey Martells – backing vocals (4, 5, 11)
- Rian Peters – backing vocals (6)

== Production ==
- Tony Swain – executive producer
- Simon Climie – producer, recording, engineer
- Joel Evenden – recording, Pro Tools HD engineer
- Alan Douglas – engineer
- Shannon Forrest – engineer
- Don Murray – engineer
- Brandon Dekora – assistant engineer
- Mo Hauzler – assistant engineer
- George Nixon – assistant engineer
- Phil Rose – assistant engineer
- Ken Takagashi – assistant engineer
- Grady Walker – assistant engineer
- Mick Guzauski – mixing
- Tom Bender – mix assistant
- Bob Ludwig – mastering at Gateway Mastering (Portland, Maine)
- Debbie Johnson – production coordinator
- Dee Harrington – project coordinator
- Sandra Brummels – creative director
- Christopher Kornmann – art direction, design
- Danny Clinch – photography
- Vector Management – management

== Charts ==
Chart performance for Soul Speak
Chart (2008)	Peak position
US Billboard 200	12
US Top R&B/Hip-Hop Albums (Billboard)	10
