= Sanford-Townsend Band =

American rock and roll band from Alabama

The Sanford-Townsend Band
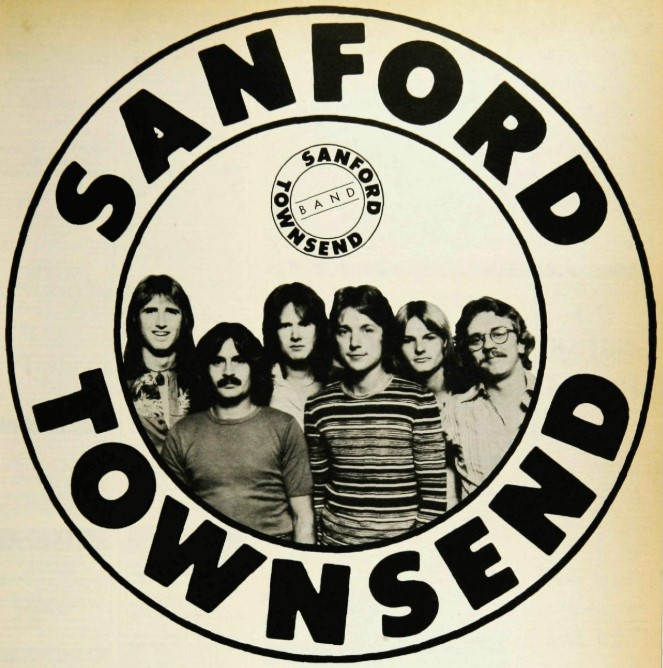
- The band in 1976 (Sanford on the far right, Townsend third from the left)

Background information
- Origin: Alabama, United States
- Genres: Pop rock, blue-eyed soul
- Years active: 1974–1980
- Label: Warner Bros.
- Past members: Ed Sanford; Johnny Townsend; Roger Johnson; Otis Hale; Jerry Rightmer; Jim Varley

The Sanford-Townsend Band was an American rock band from Alabama who scored a hit single in 1977 with "Smoke from a Distant Fire". The band was named after its founders, keyboardists Ed Sanford and John Townsend, the latter of whom was also their lead singer.

== History ==
The Sanford-Townsend Band featured keyboardists Ed Sanford (from Montgomery, Alabama) and Johnny Townsend (from Tuscaloosa, Alabama), who previously worked together in a Tuscaloosa-based band called The Heart (not to be confused with the band Heart fronted by Ann and Nancy Wilson from Seattle/Vancouver).

After reuniting in Los Angeles, Sanford and Townsend signed a publishing deal with Chappell Music and began writing songs, most notably "Peacemaker" for Loggins and Messina, which was co-written by Sanford and Townsend with Kenny Loggins.

Their 1976 self-titled album, recorded at the famous Muscle Shoals Sound Studio in Alabama, started getting attention when "Smoke from a Distant Fire" reached No. 9 on the Billboard Hot 100, No. 9 in Cash Box, and No. 13 in Record World. The album was retitled with the name of the hit song and re-released as just by Sanford & Townsend. The band supported the song by opening for Fleetwood Mac on their Rumours tour, as well as concerts with The Marshall Tucker Band, Charlie Daniels, Jimmy Buffett, Foreigner, and Heart.

The band's follow-up albums, Duo-Glide (also credited to Sanford & Townsend) and Nail Me To The Wall (back to the full band name again), were significantly less successful. Sanford and Townsend returned to their careers as session musicians and songwriters.

The band's long-time bassist, Jerry Rightmer, died in 2007 at the age of 57 from cirrhosis of the liver, brought on by hepatitis C.

Former lead guitarist Roger Johnson currently works with his wife in publishing. He had spent 25 years in the film industry as a video technician and editor subsequent to his time in the Sanford-Townsend Band.

In 2008, John Townsend formed the Toler/Townsend Band with Dan Toler. Townsend's tenor voice remains substantially unchanged from thirty years prior.

== Principal band members ==
- John Wayne Townsend: lead vocals, keyboards
- Ed Sanford: keyboards, vocals
- Roger Johnson: lead guitar, backing vocals
- Otis Hale: guitar, woodwinds, backing vocals
- Jerry Rightmer: bass, backing vocals
- Jim Varley: drums

== Discography ==
=== Albums ===
- Sanford Townsend Band (1976)
- Smoke from a Distant Fire (1977) (Credited to just Sanford & Townsend) – US No. 57
- Duo-Glide (1978) (Credited to just Sanford & Townsend) – US No. 92
- Nail Me to the Wall (1979)

=== Singles ===
List of singles, with selected chart positions
Title	Year	Chart positions		Album
Title	Year	US	AUS	Album
"Shake It to the Right"	1977	—	—	Sanford Townsend Band
"Smoke from a Distant Fire"	1977	9	44	Sanford Townsend Band
"Eye of My Storm (Oh Woman)"	1978	—	—	Duo-Glide
