= Time Out of Mind (Steely Dan song) =

1981 single by Steely Dan

Single by Steely Dan

from the album Gaucho
- B-side: "Bodhisattva" (live)
- Released: March 14, 1981
- Genre: Jazz rock; pop rock
- Length: 4:13
- Label: MCA
- Songwriters: Walter Becker; Donald Fagen
- Producer: Gary Katz

Steely Dan singles chronology
"Hey Nineteen" (1980)	"Time Out of Mind" (1981)	"Babylon Sisters" (1981)

Official Audio
- "Time Out of Mind" on YouTube

"Time Out of Mind" is a song by the American rock group Steely Dan that was first released on their 1980 album Gaucho. It was also released as the album's second single in 1981, peaking at number 22 on the Billboard Hot 100 and remaining on the chart for 11 weeks, including seven weeks in the Top 40. It was Steely Dan's final hit before disbanding in the summer of that year.

The writing of "Time Out of Mind" took place amid the worsening drug addiction of Walter Becker, who co-wrote the song with his bandmate Donald Fagen. The meaning of the lyrics is not explicit, but they are generally thought to concern heroin use. The song has been described by critics as "oddly cheery" and "deceptively upbeat".

The creation of "Time Out of Mind" was difficult, as with the rest of the album. Mark Knopfler, the Dire Straits guitarist hired to play on the track, described his experience recording the part as "painstaking". Overdubbing and obsessive mixing caused the tape containing the song to degrade, making the mixing process delicate and restrictive. Becker was only minimally involved by then, having been badly injured in a car accident and only able to communicate with the studio by phone. The mix was eventually finished before the tape was ruined. Before the single's release, several radio stations were already playing the song, causing MCA Records to hurriedly release the single with a reused B-side and leading to a minor dispute between the record company and Steely Dan.

== Background and production ==
Steely Dan members Walter Becker and Donald Fagen wrote "Time Out of Mind" at Fagen's Malibu home not long before the song would be recorded.

Shortly after work began on the Gaucho album in 1978, Becker and Fagen assembled their desired personnel for the track. Backing vocalist Michael McDonald and drummer Rick Marotta were regular collaborators, while others, such as keyboardist Rob Mounsey, had not worked with them before. Becker played bass guitar, and Fagen sang lead vocals. Fagen also played piano, electric piano, and synthesizer, though Mounsey played these instruments for the instrumental section. Mounsey, although credited with the song's horn arrangement, said that he simply reworked parts written by Fagen. In the interest of simplicity, Fagen was credited for the electric piano and synthesizer, and Mounsey was credited for the piano and horn arrangement.

After the basic track was recorded, Becker and Fagen recruited Dire Straits guitarist Mark Knopfler to overdub a guitar track, Knopfler having impressed the two with his playing on Dire Straits' self-titled debut album. Becker noted that Knopfler seemed "worried" about the recording; Knopfler could not sight-read and had to prepare by listening to a tape of the song at home, where he realized he did not know all of the chords or which parts of the song he was expected to play over. In the studio, Knopfler was asked to do many takes, working in the studio until 4 a.m. He mistook Becker and Fagen's typical exhaustiveness for dissatisfaction with his abilities. Fagen said of the session:

"[W]e were having a hard time getting anything from him. We loved the way he sounded, and we wanted to have something good on tape when he went home, so we just kept stopping and starting. And finally we did get something we liked. Not much, but enough to use."

Knopfler described the experience as "painstaking" and "like getting into a swimming pool with lead weights tied to your boots", although he, Becker, and Fagen were ultimately pleased with the results.

Not every player on the track reported such a laborious recording experience; according to Marotta, "Donald [Fagen] and I did ... 'Time Out of Mind,' just the three of us—the click track, Donald, and me. He sang and played piano, and I played the drum track. It took no time. That's what's on the record."

In 1980, as "Time Out of Mind" was undergoing rigorous mixing, the tape containing the song began shedding significantly due to repeated plays. Engineer Elliot Scheiner recalled seeing "oxide building up on the heads" as the tape was played, and he feared it was "falling apart". To avoid destroying the tape altogether, Fagen and Scheiner had to limit the number of times they ran it again while finishing the mix.

== Composition and lyrics ==
"Time Out of Mind" was described by Jeff Giles of Ultimate Classic Rock as consisting of "sunny horn charts, [a] minimalistic, toe-tapping beat ... and [a] deceptively dark singalong chorus". It opens with Marotta's drum beat, Fagen's piano riff, and a brief guitar solo by Knopfler before Fagen's vocals commence. Following the second chorus, there is an instrumental bridge that lasts for about fifty seconds. The song's chord structure consists wholly of parallel root-position chords.

According to many analyses, the lyrics concern heroin use. Stewart Mason of AllMusic called it "a barely veiled song about heroin", citing a lyric in the chorus that makes reference to "chasing the dragon" and a line in the second verse about a "mystical sphere ... direct from Lhasa". (Note: In Gaucho's liner notes, "mystical sphere" was transcribed as "mystical stone". Corrected lyrics were uploaded to Steely Dan's official website, which also changed the spelling of "Lasa" to "Lhasa".) According to David Browne of Rolling Stone, "the narrator of 'Time Out of Mind' just wants another heroin high".

Ian MacDonald of Uncut noted the tonal contrast between the song's music and lyrics, writing that its "sublime enlightenment ... turns out to be chemical", and that the band's lyrics in general "exude class as well as underclass, while the music, whatever its guise or disguise, is immaculate." In his book Major Dudes, critic Barney Hoskyns similarly remarked on this juxtaposition, calling the song "an oddly cheery junkie classic". Additionally, Hosykns noted that the song was "written in the full flow of Becker's turn-of-the-decade addiction," a reference to Becker's spiraling drug use at the time. Dan Weiss of Billboard suggested that, considering the subject matter, the song is "deceptively upbeat ... despite (or because of?) the addictions tearing Walter Becker apart from artistic success and his friendship with Donald Fagen".

Some critics did not regard "Time Out of Mind" as a song explicitly about drugs. Richard Cromelin of the Los Angeles Times characterized the song as "a cryptic, high-spirited outline of some mystical ceremony", and Stephen Holden of The New York Times interpreted it as mocking "gurus".

The phrase "time out of mind", Richard F. Thomas suggested in his essay "Shadows Are Falling", is synonymous with "time immemorial", a phrase denoting time that extends "beyond memory or record". Thomas, while examining the title of the 1997 Bob Dylan album Time Out of Mind, said that the phrase "draws attention to the importance of memory", and he named the Steely Dan song as one of the Dylan album's intertextual connections. In his Ultimate Classic Rock write-up of the song, Jeff Giles reworded the phrase as time "out of one's skull", a state of "disconnected bliss" achieved through drugs.

== Release and reception ==
=== Album and single releases ===
"Time Out of Mind" was originally released in the US by MCA Records as the fifth track on Gaucho on November 21, 1980. It was released in the US as Gaucho's second single on March 14, 1981. It was also released as the B-side of "Babylon Sisters", the album's third single, in the UK that same month.

Following its release, there was a dispute between Steely Dan and MCA Records regarding the B-side of "Time Out of Mind"; Becker, Fagen, and producer Gary Katz had settled on Gaucho's closer, "Third World Man", as the B-side, but MCA instead released "Time Out of Mind" with the live version of "Bodhisattva" which had just been used as the B-side of "Hey Nineteen", Steely Dan's single from the previous year. Steely Dan's manager Irving Azoff felt MCA was trying to drum up album sales by refusing to put an album track on the single's B-side. According to Bob Siner of MCA, the decision to use "Bodhisattva" had to do with radio stations' urgent demand for a new Steely Dan single; several stations, including WABC-FM in New York, had been airing "Time Out of Mind" before it was officially out as a single, so the company used a B-side that was already mastered in order to expedite the single's release.

=== Critical reception ===
In an issue of Billboard following the release of Gaucho, "Time Out of Mind" was listed first of the album's "best cuts". In a review of the album, Richard Cromelin of the Los Angeles Times assessed the song as "a piece of catchy, propulsive pop that reveals little but conveys much". A 1981 issue of Record World gave an approving description of the single after its release, calling it "a box of mixed chocolates ... offer[ing] an aural array of rich keyboard/guitar figures—all by a star-studded cast."

In a review of Gaucho, Richard Evans of Melody Maker complained that Knopfler's guitar work was overpowered in the mix and rendered nearly inaudible, and he likened Steely Dan's use of Knopfler on the song to "employing Michelangelo to paint your ceiling with Dulux". In a retrospective review of the song, AllMusic critic Stewart Mason echoed Evans's criticism, calling the song's guitar "lackluster" and saying:

"[F]or some odd reason, it's mixed well behind the rest of the arrangement, so far back that the listener has to pay careful attention even to hear it properly; worse yet, it's not a particularly memorable solo, and it's so lacking in Knopfler's usual distinctive style that even a Dire Straits fan probably couldn't guess it was him without looking at the credits."

Another AllMusic critic, Stephen Thomas Erlewine, in a retrospective review of Gaucho, criticized the album as a whole for being "precise and studied" but cited "Time Out of Mind" as one of its redeeming tracks, calling it "suave" in contrast to "the remainder of the album's glossy, meandering fusion". In his book The Special Liveliness of Hooks in Popular Music and Beyond, musician and composer Steven G. Smith praised the song's "limpid arrangement" and Marotta's drum part in particular, saying:

"The great hook is not in any of the early fills ... It comes after the song is well launched, at a point in the second section of the first verse when it strikes you that there should have been another fill or two but...there wasn't. That's when you realize the beat is unstoppable, sovereign and essential, mattering more than anything else Marotta could conceivably add to it. It's scarcely more than the boom-chick-boom-chick of bass drum and snare ... but it's awesomely crisp."

The song was included in music journalist and historian Bruce Pollock's reference book Rock Song Index, which aimed to identify "the most important songs as well as the biggest" between 1944 and 2000.

=== Chart performance ===
==== Weekly charts ====
Chart	Peak position
Canada RPM Top Singles	31
US Billboard Hot 100	22
US Billboard Adult Contemporary	13
US Cash Box Top 100	23

==== Year-end charts ====
Chart	Rank
US Billboard Hot 100	138

== Personnel ==
Adapted from the liner notes:

- Donald Fagen – lead vocals, electric piano, synthesizer (Note: Though credited separately, Fagen and Mounsey worked together on piano, electric piano, synthesizer, and the horn arrangement.)
- Rick Marotta – drums
- Walter Becker – bass guitar, electric guitar
- Rob Mounsey – piano, horn arrangement
- Hugh McCracken – electric guitar
- Mark Knopfler – electric guitar
- Randy Brecker – trumpet
- Michael Brecker – tenor saxophone
- Dave Tofani – tenor saxophone
- David Sanborn – alto saxophone
- Ronnie Cuber – baritone saxophone
- Michael McDonald, Lesley Miller, Patti Austin, Valerie Simpson – backing vocals (Note: Lesley Miller is credited as "Leslie Miller" in the liner notes.)
