= I.G.Y. (What a Beautiful World) =

Single by Donald Fagen

from the album The Nightfly
- B-side: "Walk Between Raindrops"
- Released: September 1982
- Genre: Jazz rock; jazz-funk; R&B
- Length: 6:03 (album version); 4:56 (7" single)
- Label: Warner Bros. - 7-29900
- Songwriter: Donald Fagen
- Producer: Gary Katz

Donald Fagen singles chronology
"I.G.Y. (What a Beautiful World)" (1982)	"New Frontier" (1983)

"I.G.Y. (What a Beautiful World)" is a song written and performed by American songwriter, singer and musician Donald Fagen. It was the first track on his platinum-certified debut solo album The Nightfly, and was released in September 1982 as its first single. It charted within the top 30 on the Billboard Hot 100, Mainstream Rock, R&B Singles and Adult Contemporary charts.

== Background ==
Fagen, along with musician Walter Becker, led the rock band Steely Dan during the 1970s. Between 1972 and 1981, Steely Dan had ten Top-40 singles, including the top-ten hits "Do It Again" (1972), "Rikki Don't Lose That Number" (1974) and "Hey Nineteen" (1980). In 1981 Becker and Fagen parted ways. Fagen's first album as a solo artist, The Nightfly, was released the next year.

== Title and lyrics ==
The "I.G.Y." of the title refers to the International Geophysical Year, an event that ran from July 1957 to December 1958. The I.G.Y. was an international scientific project promoting collaboration among the world's scientists. Fagen's lyrics discuss the widespread optimistic vision of the future at that time, including futuristic concepts such as solar-powered cities, a transatlantic tunnel, permanent space stations, and spandex jackets.

The song references the vision of postwar optimism in America and the Western world. The "76" referred to in the song is 1976, the United States Bicentennial year.

== Chart performance and accolades ==
"I.G.Y." debuted on the Billboard Hot 100 on October 9, 1982, at number 56. It reached the top 40 on October 30 and eventually peaked at number 26 on November 27, 1982. It also reached number 8 on Billboard's Adult Contemporary chart, number 17 on Billboard's Mainstream Rock chart, and number 54 on Billboard's R&B Singles chart. It was Fagen's only solo Top 40 hit on the Billboard Hot 100 chart.

The track was also a top 40 hit in Canada, and charted outside the top 40 in Australia and Holland.

It was nominated for the Grammy Award for Song of the Year in 1983, losing to "Always on My Mind".

== Cover versions ==
"I.G.Y." has been covered by British singer and musician Howard Jones, who included a version on his 1993 greatest hits album The Best of Howard Jones. Issued as a single, the track was a minor chart hit in the UK and Germany (countries where Fagen's original did not chart).

The gospel a cappella group Take 6 covered "I.G.Y." as the title track on their 2002 release Beautiful World. The lyric of Fagen's original song was modified to recast the song with a gospel message.

In 2004 Marcia Hines recorded a version for her album Hinesight.

== Personnel ==
- Donald Fagen – vocals, synthesizer, synth-harmonica
- Greg Phillinganes – electric piano
- Rob Mounsey – synthesizer, horn arrangement
- Anthony Jackson – bass
- Hugh McCracken – guitar
- James Gadson – drums
- Jeff Porcaro – additional drums
- Roger Nichols – drum/percussion programming
- Starz Vanderlocket – percussion
- Randy Brecker – trumpet
- Dave Tofani – alto saxophone
- Michael Brecker – tenor saxophone
- Ronnie Cuber – baritone saxophone
- Dave Bargeron – trombone
- Valerie Simpson, Zack Sanders, Frank Floyd, Gordon Grody – backing vocals

== Charts ==
Chart (1982–1983)	Peak position
Australia (Kent Music Report)	53
Canada 50 Singles (RPM)	36
Canada Adult Contemporary (RPM)	2
Netherlands (Single Top 100)	46
US Adult Contemporary (Billboard)	8
US Billboard Hot 100	26
US Cashbox Top 100	19
US Rock Albums & Top Tracks (Billboard)	17

== In popular culture ==
French DJ Producer Alan Braxe sampled this song for the remix on Benjamin Diamond's "In Your Arms (We Gonna Make It)".
