= Roger Rosenberg =

American jazz saxophonist (born 1951)

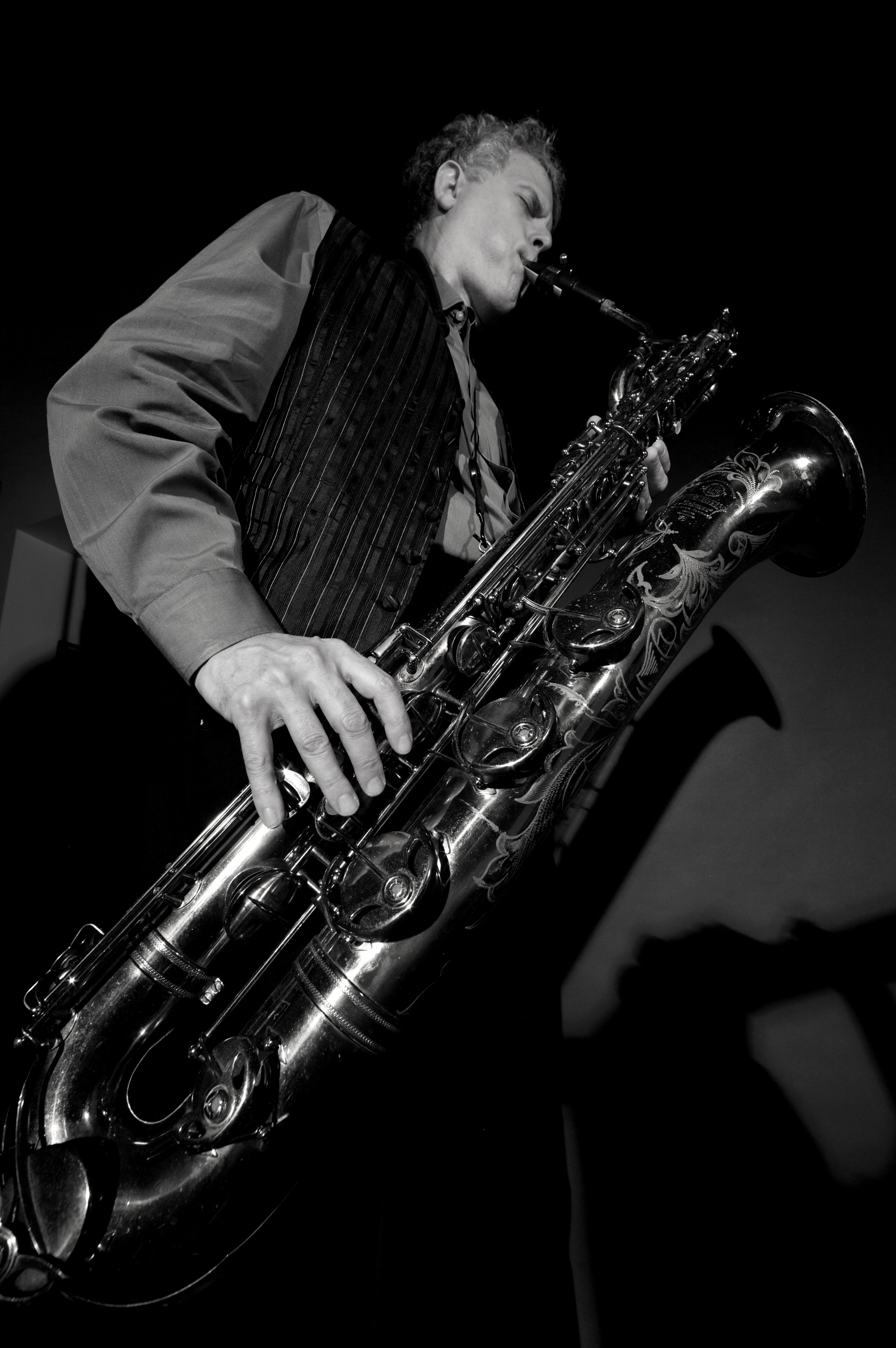
- Rosenberg playing baritone saxophone

Background information
- Born: May 26, 1951; New York City, U.S.
- Genres: Jazz, Latin jazz
- Occupations: Musician, composer, studio musician
- Instruments: Baritone saxophone, saxophones, clarinet, bass clarinet, bassoon, flute
- Years active: 1970s–present
- Formerly of: Steely Dan, Bob Mintzer Big Band

Roger Rosenberg (born May 26, 1951) is an American jazz saxophonist.

== Early life and education ==
Roger Rosenberg was born in 1951 in New York City and grew up on Manhattan's Upper West Side. His high-school teachers offered any student willing to learn the baritone saxophone the opportunity to own the school's rarely used instrument, and the young Rosenberg accepted.

As a teenager in the mid-1960s, Rosenberg attended a summer music camp outside New Hope, Pennsylvania, called Ramblerny. The camp was directed by renowned saxophonist Phil Woods, and Rosenberg received a scholarship to attend for three consecutive summers. There, he befriended fellow students Michael Brecker and Richie Cole, who would also become prominent jazz musicians. Rosenberg later described this experience as defining, noting that after his first summer at age 13 or 14, he knew he wanted to pursue a music career.

He went on to study at Indiana University and the New England Conservatory of Music, receiving instruction from Phil Woods and composer Harold Seletsky.

== Career ==
Rosenberg's career has included work in jazz, Latin jazz, Broadway orchestras, studio recording, and popular music. His collaborators have included Bob Mintzer, Mongo Santamaria, Chet Baker, Tito Puente, Buddy Rich, Donald Fagen, Walter Becker and The Doobie Brothers.

=== Early professional work ===
By the late 1970s, Rosenberg had become an active presence in the New York jazz scene. In 1978, he performed with George Russell's New York Big Band, and in 1979, he was part of the Lee Konitz Nonet that performed at the inaugural Chicago Jazz Festival. That performance was broadcast on NPR's Jazz Alive program hosted by Billy Taylor, and featured Rosenberg's explosive solo on John Coltrane's Giant Steps.

During this period, Rosenberg worked extensively in Latin jazz, performing with Tito Puente, Mongo Santamaria, and Ray Barretto. He also performed with drummer Buddy Rich and Chet Baker's quintet in the late 1970s and early 1980s, playing baritone, soprano, and tenor saxophones with Baker's group.

=== Bob Mintzer Big Band ===
In the early 1980s, Rosenberg became a charter member of Bob Mintzer's Big Band, a relationship that has continued for over four decades. He has appeared on virtually all of the band's recordings and remains the anchor of the saxophone section. His work with Mintzer includes albums such as Camouflage (1986), Art of the Big Band (1991), Gently (2002), and Meeting of Minds (2018) with the New York Voices.

=== Steely Dan ===
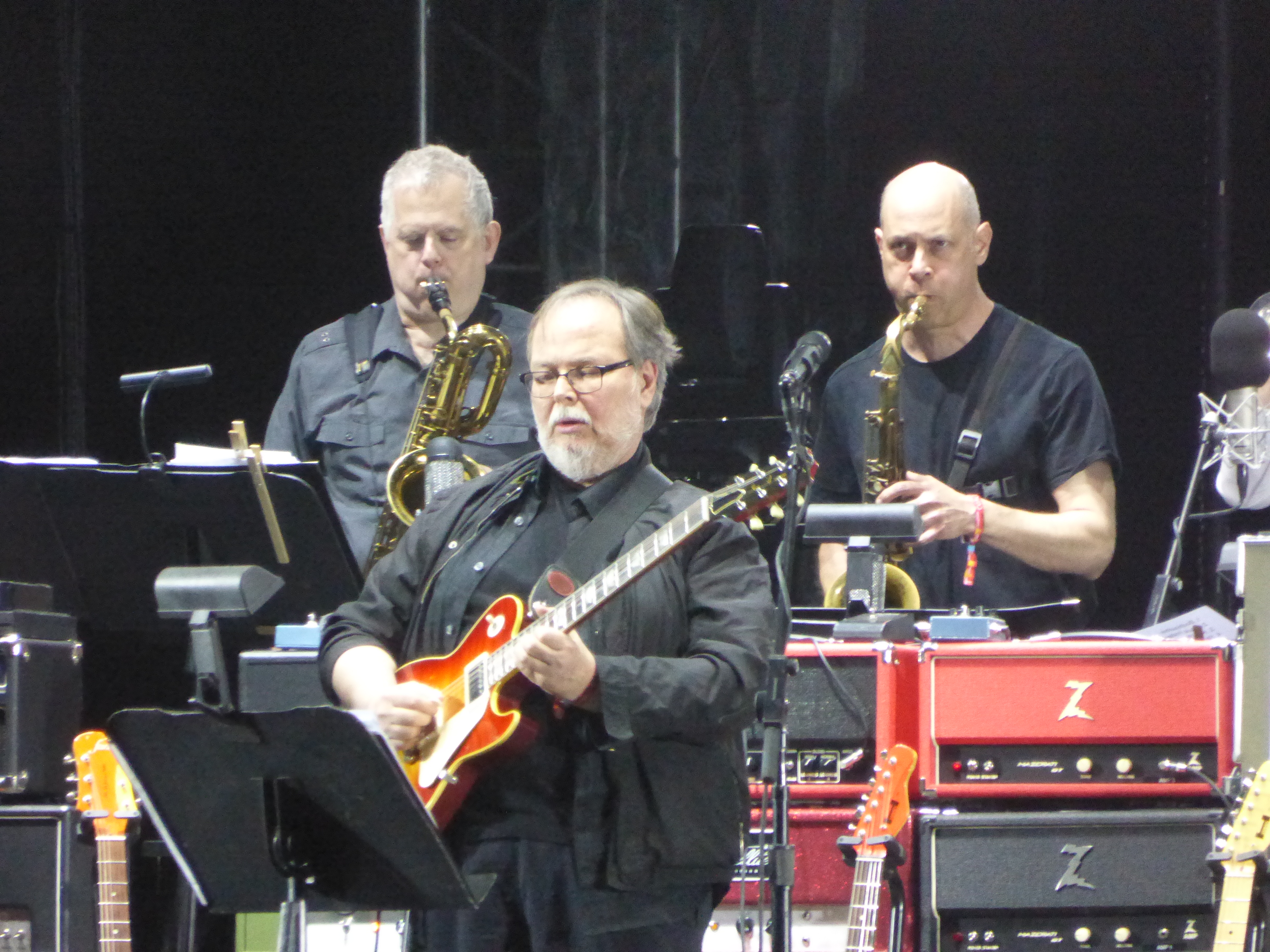
Rosenberg (left) with Walter Becker (center) and Walt Weiskopf (right)

Rosenberg has been a member of Steely Dan's touring band since 2000, performing on baritone saxophone. Although he did not begin touring with the band until 2006, he appeared on several Steely Dan and solo recordings by band members Walter Becker and Donald Fagen, including:

- Two Against Nature (2000) – Grammy Award for Album of the Year
- Everything Must Go (2003)
- Donald Fagen's Kamakiriad (1993)
- Donald Fagen's Morph the Cat (2006)
- Donald Fagen's Sunken Condos (2012)
- Walter Becker's Circus Money (2008)

=== Teaching ===
Rosenberg maintains an active teaching schedule and performs regularly with his quartet. He has conducted workshops and masterclasses at institutions including Berklee College of Music, where he has led all-baritone saxophone ensembles and discussed his career as a multi-instrumentalist and touring musician.
