= Sunken Condos =

Studio album by Donald Fagen
- Released: October 16, 2012
- Recorded: 2010–2012
- Studios: Candyland; Hirsch Studios; Sear Sound; Avatar Studios; Audio Paint; Stratosphere Recording; Pat Dillett's Studio (all in New York City)
- Genres: Yacht rock; R&B
- Length: 44:07
- Label: Reprise
- Producers: Michael Leonhart; Donald Fagen

Donald Fagen chronology
Morph the Cat (2006)	Sunken Condos (2012)	The Tom & Don Tapes, Vol. 1 (2013)

Sunken Condos is the fourth and final solo album from Steely Dan co-founder Donald Fagen, released in October 2012 through Reprise Records. It contains eight new songs and a cover of Isaac Hayes' "Out of the Ghetto". Fagen began recording the album in 2010 and described it as having a lighter feel than his earlier work, rather than being a continuation of his Nightfly trilogy.

On September 17, Rolling Stone posted a full-length preview of the song "I'm Not the Same Without You". The song charted at number 28 on the Billboard Japan Hot 100 in October 2012. The album reached number 23 on the official UK album chart on October 21 and number 12 on the Billboard 200, becoming his highest charting solo album since 1993.

== Critical response ==
Professional ratings
Aggregate scores
Source	Rating
AnyDecentMusic?	7.6/10
Metacritic	82/100
Review scores
Source	Rating
AllMusic	4.5/5 stars
The Independent	4/5 stars
The Irish Times	4/5 stars
Mojo	4/5 stars
MSN Music (Expert Witness)	A−
Q	4/5 stars
Rolling Stone	3.5/5 stars
Slant Magazine	4/5 stars
Uncut	9/10
USA Today	3/4 stars

The album was listed at No. 25 on Rolling Stone's list of the top 50 albums of 2012. The magazine stated that "the music is deceitfully lush, a snazzy cascade of rock, R&B and swing, with production as costly as a Santa Monica beach house." They also named the song "Weather in My Head" the 21st best song of 2012.

Fagen appeared on Late Show with David Letterman and performed "Weather in My Head" to promote the album.

== Track listing ==
All songs written by Donald Fagen, except where noted

No.	Title	Length
1.	"Slinky Thing"	5:12
2.	"I'm Not the Same Without You"	4:31
3.	"Memorabilia"	4:14
4.	"Weather in My Head"	5:29
5.	"The New Breed"	4:35
6.	"Out of the Ghetto" (Isaac Hayes)	4:54
7.	"Miss Marlene"	4:43
8.	"Good Stuff"	4:54
9.	"Planet D'Rhonda"	5:35

== Personnel ==
Musicians

- Donald Fagen – lead vocals (1–9), piano (1, 2, 8), Prophet 5 (1, 5, 7), Wurlitzer (4, 8, 9), B3 organ (5, 6), clavinet (4, 7, 9), Fender Rhodes (7, 8), melodica (8), background vocals (1, 2, 5–9)
- Harlan Post (alias Donald Fagen) – synth bass (2, 5, 7, 8)
- Michael Leonhart – percussion, trumpet (1–5, 8), flugelhorn (3, 7, 8), mellophone (2), mellophonium (3, 5), Fender Rhodes (2), minimoog (2, 6, 8), clavinet (1, 6), L100 organ (3), M100 organ (7), Prophet 5 (2, 4, 5, 7–9), Wurlitzer (5, 6, 9), mellotron (5), B3 organ (5, 6), Juno 6 (8), accordion (6), vibraphone (1, 6, 8, 9), glockenspiel (1), background vocals (1–3, 5–7, 9), scream (6)
- Earl Cooke Jr (alias Michael Leonhart) – drums
- Jon Herington – guitar (1, 2, 4–8), twelve-string guitar (2), rhythm guitar (9), solo guitar (4)
- Walt Weiskopf – alto saxophone (1–5, 7), tenor saxophone (3, 5), clarinet (7)
- Charlie Pillow – tenor saxophone (1, 2), clarinet (2, 6, 7), bass clarinet (6), bass flute (7)
- Roger Rosenberg – baritone saxophone (1, 2, 4), bass clarinet (7)
- Jim Pugh – trombone (1, 2, 4)
- Carolyn Leonhart – background vocals (1, 2, 4, 7–9), ad-lib vocals (1)
- Jamie Leonhart – background vocals (1, 9)
- Catherine Russell – background vocals (1, 2, 4, 7, 8)
- Cindy Mizelle – background vocals (4, 7)
- Joe Martin – acoustic bass (1)
- William Galison – harmonica (2, 5), bass harmonica (5)
- Lincoln Schleifer – bass (3, 4, 9)
- Gary Sieger – guitar (3)
- Larry Campbell – rhythm guitar (4)
- Jay Leonhart – acoustic bass (5)
- Freddie Washington – bass (6)
- Antoine Silverman – violin (6)
- Aaron Heick – bass flute (7)
- Kurt Rosenwinkel – solo guitar (9)

Production

- Donald Fagen – rhythm arrangements, vocal arrangements, horn arrangements, mixing
- Michael Leonhart – vocal and horn arrangements, engineer, mixing
- Charles Martinez – engineer
- Normyn – assistant engineer
- David Schoenwetter – assistant engineer
- Ted Tuthill – assistant engineer
- Pat Dillett – mixing, additional engineering
- Elliot Scheiner – additional engineering
- Amanda Hirsch – additional Pro Tools engineering
- Jon Silverman – assistant mix engineer
- Scott Hull – mastering

== Charts ==
Chart performance for Sunken Condos
Chart (2012)	Peak position
Austrian Albums (Ö3 Austria)	69
Belgian Albums (Ultratop Flanders)	22
Belgian Albums (Ultratop Wallonia)	99
Danish Albums (Hitlisten)	36
Dutch Albums (Album Top 100)	13
Dutch Alternative Albums (Alternative Top 30)	4
Finnish Albums (Suomen virallinen lista)	46
French Albums (SNEP)	85
German Albums (Offizielle Top 100)	29
Irish Albums (IRMA)	27
Italian Albums (FIMI)	22
Japanese Albums (Oricon)	11
Norwegian Albums (VG-lista)	5
Scottish Albums (Official Charts)	23
Swedish Albums (Sverigetopplistan)	10
Swiss Albums (Schweizer Hitparade)	53
UK Albums (Official Charts)	23
US Billboard 200	12
US Top Rock Albums (Billboard)	3
US Top Tastemaker Albums (Billboard)	3
