= Slinky (disambiguation) =

A Slinky is a helical spring toy made of metal or plastic.

Slinky also may refer to:

- Slinky Dog (character), a fictional toy dachshund in the Toy Story films
- Slinky Dog Dash, roller coaster at Disney World
- Slinky Dog Zigzag Spin, amusement ride at Disney World
- Baltimore Tower, a skyscraper in London, nicknamed "The Slinky"
- Slinky Malinki, a fictional cat in a series of children's books by Lynley Dodd
- Slinky Pictures, British film company
- Slinkee Minx, Australian dance act
- "Slinky Thing", song by Donald Fagen
