= Slinky Thing =

Song by Donald Fagen

"Slinky Thing" is a song by Donald Fagen, appearing as the first track from his album, Sunken Condos. Telling the story of an older man seeking the affection and companionship of a significantly younger woman, the song details the events surrounding the two as they spend time together and endure comments made by others, who advise the narrator to "hold on to that slinky thing". The narrator himself thinks about if "she (the younger woman) needs somebody who's closer to her own age".

The song draws similarities with the Steely Dan songs "Hey Nineteen" and "Janie Runaway", also about older men seeking relationships with younger women.

== Personnel ==
- Donald Fagen – lead vocal, piano, Prophet 5, background vocals
- Michael Leonhart – trumpet, clavinet, vibraphone, percussion, glockenspiel, background vocals
- Earl Cooke Jr (alias Michael Leonhart) – drums
- Jon Herington – guitar
- Walt Weiskopf – alto saxophone
- Charlie Pillow – tenor saxophone
- Roger Rosenberg – baritone saxophone
- Jim Pugh – trombone
- Jamie Leonhart – background vocals
- Catherine Russell – background vocals
- Joe Martin – acoustic bass

== See also ==
- Age disparity in sexual relationships
