= Good King Bad =

Studio album by George Benson
- Released: June 1976
- Recorded: July 1 & 8, October 9, and December 4–5, 1975
- Studios: Van Gelder Studio, Englewood Cliffs
- Genre: Jazz
- Length: 42:09
- Label: CTI
- Producer: Creed Taylor

George Benson chronology
In Concert-Carnegie Hall (1976)	Good King Bad (1976)	Benson & Farrell (1976)

Good King Bad is the thirteenth studio album by American guitarist George Benson featuring performances recorded in 1975 and released by CTI Records in 1976.

== Reception ==
The Allmusic review states "The R&B elements get stronger, the sound and mix are more attuned to the dancefloor, yet this brings out the best in George Benson's funky side. Thanks in part to the more rigid beat, Benson pares down his style to its rhythmic essentials, refusing to spray notes all over the place at random, and as a result, the record cooks and dances".

Professional ratings
Review scores
Source	Rating
Allmusic	4.5/5 stars
The Rolling Stone Jazz Record Guide	4/5 stars

== Track listing ==
1. "Theme from Good King Bad" (David Matthews) – 6:03 Grammy Award for Best R&B Instrumental Performance 1977
2. "One Rock Don't Make No Boulder" (Matthews) – 6:50
3. "Em" (Philip Namanworth) – 4:56
4. "Cast Your Fate to the Wind" (Vince Guaraldi) – 7:00
5. "Siberian Workout" (Matthews) – 6:45
6. "Shell of a Man" (Eugene McDaniels) – 5:17
7. "Hold On! I'm Comin'" (Issac Hayes, David Porter) – 5:44 Bonus track on CD reissue, Originally released on the compilation album Space in 1978

- Recorded at Van Gelder Studio in Englewood Cliffs, New Jersey on July 1 (track 3), July 8 (track 6), October 9 (track 7), December 4 (tracks 1 & 2) and December 5 (tracks 4 & 5), 1975

== Personnel ==
- George Benson – guitar, vocals
- Eric Gale – guitar (1–5)
- Don Grolnick – clavinet (1, 2)
- Bobby Lyle – keyboards (1, 2, 4, 5)
- Roland Hanna – keyboards (3)
- Ronnie Foster – keyboards (6)
- Gary King – bass, rhythm arrangements (3, 6)
- Andy Newmark – drums (1, 2, 4, 5)
- Steve Gadd – drums (3)
- Dennis Davis – drums (6)
- Sue Evans – percussion
- David Friedman – vibraphone (1, 4, 6)
- Joe Farrell – flute (1, 2, 4, 5)
- Romeo Penque – flute (3, 6)
- David Tofani – flute (3, 6)
- David Sanborn – alto saxophone (1)
- Michael Brecker – tenor saxophone (1)
- Frank Vicari – tenor saxophone (1, 2, 4, 5)
- Ronnie Cuber – baritone saxophone (1, 2, 4, 5)
- Fred Wesley – trombone
- Randy Brecker – trumpet (1)
- David Matthews – arrangements
- Bob James – conductor
- Charles McCracken – cello
- Alan Shulman – cello
- Harold Coletta – viola
- Theodore Israel – viola
- Max Ellen – violin
- Paul Gershman – violin
- Harry Glickman – violin
- Emanuel Green – violin
- Harold Kohon – violin
- David Nadien – violin
- John Pintavalle – violin
- Max Pollikoff – violin

== Production ==
- Creed Taylor – producer
- Rudy Van Gelder – engineer
- Rene Schumacher – album design
- Pete Turner – cover and liner photography
- Leonard Feather – liner notes

== See also ==
Space
Pacific Fire
