= Lesley Miller =

American singer and songwriter

- Born: Lesley Miller; April 18, 1943 (age 83); Baltimore, Maryland, US
- Occupations: Singer; songwriter
- Years active: 1964–present
- Notable work: "He Wore The Green Beret"; "He Quit Me"; "Am I Blue?"
- Spouse: Alan Lorber (m. 1966; div. 1972)
- Parent: Bernard and Hilda Miller
- Relatives: Harlan Miller (brother); Merle Miller (sister)
- Musical career
- Genres: Pop; rock
- Instrument: Vocals
- Labels: RCA Records; MGM Records

Lesley Miller (born April 18, 1943) is an American singer and songwriter. As a recording artist, she released several singles between 1964 and 1969. As a backing vocalist, she has recorded for numerous artists such as Frank Sinatra, Sammy Davis Jr., Lena Horne, James Brown, Blood, Sweat & Tears, Burt Bacharach, Barry Manilow, Laura Nyro and Steely Dan. On occasion she has been credited as "Leslie Miller".

She has sung on movie soundtracks, such as the song "He Quit Me" (written by Warren Zevon as "She Quit Me") for the 1969 film Midnight Cowboy, and "Am I Blue?" from the 1984 film The Cotton Club for which she recorded the singing part of actress Diane Lane.

Miller has also worked extensively as a jingle singer, recording for clients such as State Farm Mutual, American Airlines, Budweiser, Coca-Cola, and McDonald's.

== Early life ==
Miller was born in Baltimore, Maryland, the eldest of three children of Bernard Miller and Hilda (née Leviton) Miller. Her father worked for RCA Records in Publicity and Promotion.

She was involved with a singing group in high school and sang folk music with some friends, but at the time she was not thinking of music as a career. In 1959/1960 the family moved to Mamaroneck, New York. After high school she attended NYU in the Bronx (uptown campus) for one year, but felt undirected there and decided not to stay.

A family friend, Hy Zaret (who wrote the lyrics to "Unchained Melody"), asked her parents if she could sing a demo for him to pitch to Joan Baez, so her mother took her into the city to Aura Recording Studios on 7th Ave. As she was singing in the studio, it was recommended to her mother that Lesley study with Helen Hobbs Jordan, a private music teacher with a studio in the original Steinway Hall. Miller learned music theory, sightreading, and piano, and after 3 1/2 years she ventured out to try getting some work.

== Career ==
Miller's first auditions were at the Brill Building, where she introduced herself to whichever publishing companies were listed in the lobby. Chip Taylor and Ted Darryl gave her one of her first professional jobs.

Miller recorded the original demo for the song "Tommy", which would be recorded by Reparata and the Delrons. By 1964 she was signed to RCA Victor (and later MGM). She recorded an answer record to Sgt. Barry Sadler's "Ballad of the Green Berets" called "He Wore the Green Beret", which reached number 101 on the Billboard charts in 1966.

Reparata and the Delrons signed with RCA in 1965, and producer Phil Spector decided that for their first single, "I Can Tell", a third singer was necessary. It is a common misconception that Lesley Gore sang on that track, but it was Miller, while Gore recorded her own version later on.

Miller went on to release music under her own name for both RCA and MGM Records between 1964 and 1969.

As a background singer, Miller has performed for many recording artists since the early 1960s. Her singing can also be heard in several films and on their soundtracks.

Miller has also performed on hundreds of advertising jingles, most notably for producers/composers Steve Karmen, Tom Dawes, and Ginny Redington (Twinstar Music), David Horowitz (David Horowitz Music Assoc.), Susan Hamilton (HEA Music), and David Lucas (Lucas/McFaul). Quite a few jingles won awards and became famous enough to enter the pop culture mainstream for that time, such as "Reach Out and Touch Someone" for AT&T.

Miller also provided vocals for the Sesame Street short, "Milk", which aired continuously from 1975 into the 1980s.

Since the mid-1980s, Miller has collaborated with arranger and composer Denis Martin.

In recent years Miller has participated in many "classic girl group" tribute performances, and is singing in 'Dusty', a trio alongside Sherryl Marshall and Deborah Berg.

== Personal life ==
Miller was married to arranger, producer, and composer Alan Lorber from 1966 to 1972. They have one son. She currently resides in Florida.

== Selected discography ==
=== Solo works ===
For RCA Victor:

- "Once A Fool" / "Just Another Fresh Boy" (June 1964)
- "Heartache Is Over" / "Walk With Me" (October 1964)
- "(You Got A Way Of) Bringin' Out My Tears" / "I Talk To Your Picture" (June 1965)
- "He Doesn't Need Your Pity" / "I'm Going Back To My First Love" (January 1966)
- "He Wore The Green Beret" / "(You Got A Way Of) Bringin' Out My Tears" (U.S. Charts #101) (March 1966)
- "Mountain Of Our Love" / "Everybody Knows But Me" (April 1966)

For MGM:

- "Teach Me To Love You" / "Think Of Rain" (June 1967)
- "You Ain't Goin' Nowhere" / "Teach Me To Love You" (July 1969)

=== Compilations ===
- Broadway First Take 2, Cast Recording – Burt Bacharach/Richard Rodgers/Jerry Herman (2000)

=== As part of a trio ===
- Reparata and the Delrons / "I Can Tell" – RCA (December, 1965)

=== As a background singer ===
- Laura Nyro – More Than A New Discovery (1967)
- The Archies – Various (1968–1972)
- Melissa Manchester – Bright Eyes (1974)
- Roberta Flack – Feel Like Makin' Love (1975)
- Elliott Randall – Randall's New York (1977)
- Steely Dan – Gaucho (1980)
- Donald Fagen – The Nightfly (1982)
- Michael Franks – Passionfruit (1983)
- Monica Passin – Monette (2017)

=== As a composer ===
- Orpheus – "Brown Arms In Houston" (lyrics) (1968)

=== Collaborations with Denis Martin ===
- It's O.K. To Play (2008)
- Women United Round The World (2010)
- Christmas Should Come More Than Once A Year (2012)
- Nanna Bop (2018)
- My Reality (2018)

== Film ==
- "He Quit Me" from Midnight Cowboy (1969) (sometimes credited as Leslie Miller)
- "Can't Help Loving You" from The Bride (1973)
- You Light Up My Life (1977)
- The Wiz (1978) (Choir)
- "Am I Blue?" from The Cotton Club (1984) (uncredited)
- The Life and Adventures of Santa Claus (1985) - Necile (voice)

== Television ==
- The David Letterman Show, Carly Simon, "All I Want Is You" (11/19/1987)

== Notable live performances ==
- She's Got The Power! – A Girl Group Extravaganza (featuring Ronnie Spector, Lala Brooks, Lesley Gore) – Lincoln Center, New York City (2011)
- Stoned Soul Weekend: New York Pays Tribute to Laura Nyro – Lincoln Center, New York City (2012)
- Girl Group Spectacular, B.B. King's Club, New York City (2013)
