= The Nightfly =

Studio album by Donald Fagen
- Released: October 1, 1982
- Recorded: 1981–1982
- Studios: Soundworks Digital Audio/Video Recording Studios (New York); Village Recorders (Los Angeles); Automated Sound (New York)
- Genres: Jazz pop; pop rock; R&B
- Length: 38:46
- Label: Warner Bros.
- Producer: Gary Katz

Donald Fagen chronology
The Nightfly (1982)	Kamakiriad (1993)

Singles from The Nightfly
- 1. "I.G.Y. (What a Beautiful World)" Released: September 1982; 2. "New Frontier" Released: January 1983; 3. "Ruby Baby" Released: April 1983

The Nightfly is the debut solo studio album by American singer-songwriter Donald Fagen. Produced by Gary Katz, it was released on October 1, 1982, by Warner Bros. Records. Although The Nightfly includes a number of production staff and musicians who had worked with Fagen's band Steely Dan, it was Fagen's first release without longtime collaborator and bandmate Walter Becker.

Unlike most of Fagen's previous work, The Nightfly is highly autobiographical. Many of the songs relate to the cautiously optimistic mood of his suburban childhood in the late 1950s and early 1960s and incorporate such topics as late-night jazz disc jockeys, fallout shelters, and the Cuban Revolution. Recorded over eight months at various studios in New York City and Los Angeles, the album is an early example of a fully digital recording in popular music. The adoption of this nascent technology, as well as the perfectionistic attitude of the musicians and engineers, made the album difficult to record.

The Nightfly was a critical and commercial success. It was certified platinum in both the US and UK, and generated the top 40 hit "I.G.Y." and the MTV favorite "New Frontier". The album received seven nominations at the 25th Annual Grammy Awards in 1983. The relatively low-key but enduring popularity of The Nightfly led Robert J. Toth of The Wall Street Journal to dub it "one of pop music's sneakiest masterpieces."

== Background ==
As a child in suburban New Jersey, Donald Fagen enjoyed listening to rock and roll pioneers Chuck Berry and Fats Domino, but felt that as rock music gained popularity, it lost an edge. Fagen, a "lonely" child, then turned to late-night jazz radio shows for the vitality he felt that newer rock music lacked. As he got older, he intended to go to graduate school and pursue literature. Instead, he was "swept up" into the counterculture at Bard College, where he met Walter Becker. They later moved to Los Angeles at the suggestion of their friend Gary Katz and took jobs as staff writers for ABC Records. Together, they formed Steely Dan, releasing their first album, Can't Buy a Thrill, in 1972. Over the course of the decade, the group became successful on the strength of the albums Countdown to Ecstasy (1973), Pretzel Logic (1974), Katy Lied (1975), The Royal Scam (1976), and Aja (1977), the band's best-selling effort and a critical favorite. They gradually shifted from performing live to working solely in the studio, making the project a revolving selection of session musicians at the behest of Fagen and Becker.

Their relationship became strained during the making of 1980's Gaucho, largely due to their insistence on perfection. Both Becker and Fagen would later recall they seemed depressed, and Becker was in the midst of drug addiction and withdrawal. Though Fagen imagined they might "stick it out for a while," he admitted to critic Robert Palmer of The New York Times in June 1981 that the group had separated: "Basically, we decided after writing and playing together for 14 years, we could use a changement d'air as the French say." After their split, Fagen worked on a song for the 1981 film Heavy Metal, which got him back into the studio. He began working towards a solo album shortly thereafter. "Working on it has been interesting. The fact that it's not a Steely Dan album has freed me from a certain image, a preconceived idea of how it'll sound," he said at the time. Fagen had hoped to record music on his own "a year or so" prior to the duo's breakup. The album was originally slated to be titled Talk Radio.

== Recording and production ==
The Nightfly was recorded in 1981–82 at Soundworks Digital Audio/Video Recording Studios and Automated Sound in New York City, and at Village Recorders in Los Angeles. Producer Gary Katz, engineer Roger Nichols, and mix engineer Elliot Scheiner had all worked on most of the seven previous Steely Dan albums. Many of the session musicians had also played with Steely Dan, including drummer Jeff Porcaro and guitarists Rick Derringer and Larry Carlton. The album's liner notes credit a total of 31 musicians.

During a radio interview on Off the Record in 1983, Fagen revealed that, though initially the album's songs came to him easily, he began to struggle without the aid of Becker. This turned into a lengthy period of writer's block after the album was finished. His demos for the album were mostly composed on keyboards and a drum machine and remained without lyrics, to allow for alteration when in the studio.

The Nightfly is one of the earliest examples of a fully digital recording in popular music. Katz and Fagen had previously experimented with digital recording for Gaucho, which ended up entirely analog. Nichols conducted experiments and found that the digital recordings sounded better than those recorded to magnetic tape. To prepare to use the digital technology, the album's engineers took classes at 3M headquarters in Saint Paul, Minnesota. The Nightfly was recorded using 3M's 32-track and four-track digital recorders. Nichols built the "Wendel II" digital drum machine, a sequel to the original "Wendel" which had been used on Gaucho. The new model's bit depth was upgraded from 8-bit to 16-bit, and it "plugged straight into the 3M digital machines, so there was no degradation" in sound caused by digital-to-analog conversion.

Problems with the new technology surfaced in the beginning, particularly regarding the alignment of the 3M machines. Representatives from 3M had to be called to align the machines; when Fagen and Nichols grew tired of this, Nichols and engineers Jerry Garsszva and Wayne Yurgelun took classes at 3M's Minnesota headquarters and returned knowing how to align the machines themselves. "I was ready to transfer to analog and give it up on several occasions, but my engineering staff kept talking me into it", Fagen remembered. They practiced an early form of "comping" Fagen's vocals (which they called "beat[ing] the computer"), wherein he would record multiple takes and the engineers would combine the best lines from each take. On "Walk Between Raindrops", they combined bass parts playing on a keyboard bass and bass guitar; doubling bass lines would later "become common practice on many records", according to writer James Sweet.

Fagen opted to overdub each part separately for The Nightfly. It became enormously difficult, between this approach and the new technology, to record the album. Pianist Michael Omartian "objected strongly" when Fagen tasked him to "set the groove" of the title track on his own, with nothing but a click track for him to listen to. On another occasion, Fagen "demanded subtle timing differences between the left and right-hand piano parts" on "Ruby Baby"; the effect he desired was achieved by having Omartian and Greg Phillinganes play together on the same keyboard. For the "party noises" in "Ruby Baby", the team first suspended a microphone from the ceiling of Studio 54 (located next door to the studio they were working in) and recorded one of Jerry Rubin's "business parties". Unsatisfied with the results, they instead held a party in the studio by themselves and included that ambience in the song.

Larry Carlton, who performs lead guitar on much of the album, recorded his parts in four days. During his time in the studio at Soundworks, he noticed a humming sound coming from his amplifier. The engineers discovered the source on the other side of the wall: a large magnet in an adjacent Metropolitan Transportation Authority substation. (Note: Soundworks Digital was located at 254 W 54th Street, which backs on to MTA Substation #13 at 225 W 53rd Street.) In one instance, a strange smell permeated the studio space at Soundworks; the studio staff "gutted" the studio, removing its air conditioning, carpeting, and recording console until they found a deceased rat in a drainpipe. Sessions regularly stretched long into the evening, which Fagen referred to as "being on the night train". The album took eight months to record and was mixed in ten days. In a 2020 interview with Leo Sidran, Fagen confessed to having had "a nervous breakdown" during mixing, which required psychotherapy and resulted in a lengthy period of writer's block.

== Composition ==
Note: The songs on this album represent certain fantasies that might have been entertained by a young man growing up in the remote suburbs of a northeastern city during the late fifties and early sixties, i.e., one of my general height, weight and build.

— A note from Fagen in the liner notes of The Nightfly

The Nightfly is considered more jazz-influenced than Fagen's previous work, and his lyrics on the album are more wistful and nostalgic than the typically sardonic tone of Steely Dan. Fagen aimed for the lyrics to have "as little irony as possible", and stated that his goal was to make an album that was fun to listen to. As many of the songs came from an adolescent viewpoint, he hoped for them to maintain "a certain innocence". As Walter Becker was responsible for many of the more sarcastic elements in Steely Dan's music, many writers have considered his absence the reason for the album's "warm and nostalgic" tone. Another difference between The Nightfly and his work with Becker is that it maintains a focus on a "certain period [or] motif", according to Fagen. Though Fagen hints at autobiographical aspects of the music in the album's liner notes, he downplayed this notion in a later interview: "It is not me exactly. It is a composite character of myself, what I remember and people I knew. Plus, it includes my feelings in retrospect."

According to Sam Sutherland in Billboard, Fagen's songs on the album "shimmer with jazz harmonies and alternately swing, shuffle or bounce to a samba". Will Fulford-Jones, in his appraisal of the album in 1001 Albums You Must Hear Before You Die, considered the album ironic in that while it focuses on an earlier, "simpler" time, its production sounded modern. Fagen held a "propensity for the perfect drum track", and multiple drummers are credited on the album, sometimes on the same song. For example, on "I.G.Y.", James Gadson played the snare drum, kick drum, and hi-hat while Jeff Porcaro performed the tom-tom fills. Some songs feature Nichols' drum machine "Wendel II". Fagen feared listeners finding plagiarism in his lyrics, so he altered a lyric in "The Goodbye Look"—"Behind the big casinos by the beach"—as it "reminded him of a line from a well-known poem". He was also concerned the "late line" lyrics in the title track were too close to the late-night news program Nightline.

== Songs ==
"The Nightfly"
The title song builds its concept around a late-night disc jockey, which is also depicted on the album cover.

The album opens with "I.G.Y.", the title of which refers to the "International Geophysical Year", an event that ran from July 1957 to December 1958. The I.G.Y. was an international scientific project promoting collaboration in Earth science amidst Cold War tensions. Fagen's lyrics reference, from the point of view of that time, an optimistic vision of futuristic concepts such as solar-powered cities, a transatlantic tunnel, permanent space stations, and spandex jackets. Fagen remembered being enchanted by the prospects of a "gleaming future" and hoped to give an optimistic look back at it. The title of "Green Flower Street" references the jazz standard "On Green Dolphin Street". Fagen's version of "Ruby Baby", written by Jerry Leiber and Mike Stoller, is modeled after the Drifters' recording of the song. For his rewrite of "Ruby Baby", he listened to several records from the 1950s to "get a general atmosphere of the period." "Maxine" references the harmonies of the Four Freshmen, and revolves around an "extremely idealized version of high-school romance." The music was created from an Ed Greene drum track taken from sessions for another song.

"New Frontier" follows a "gawky teenager" inviting a girl to his family's backyard fallout shelter for a party. "The Nightfly", the title song, was described by American novelist Arthur Phillips as a "portrait of a late-night D.J. in Baton Rouge, taking lunatic phone calls from listeners while silently battling his own loneliness and regret." According to Fagen, the song "uses a lot of images from the blues: that hair formula gets its name from Charley Patton, the old delta blues guitarist, and Mount Belzoni gets its name from another old blues lyric: 'When the trial's in Belzoni/No need to scream and cry.'" "The Goodbye Look" alludes to the popularity of bossa nova in the 1960s. The song is a "tale of military upheaval on a Caribbean island." The album's closing track, "Walk Between Raindrops", has origins in a Jewish folk tale. It was the last song to be recorded, and took form "almost as an afterthought" according to Sweet.

== Artwork ==
The back cover of the album depicts a house with a solitary window lit. Commentators took this as a memory of Fagen's youth.

The album's cover artwork features a photo of Donald Fagen as a disc jockey, wearing a collared shirt and tie and speaking into an RCA Type 77-DX microphone. In front of him is a turntable (a 16-inch 1950s model, with a Para-Flux A-16 tonearm), an ashtray, a matchbook, and a pack of Chesterfield King cigarettes. Visible on the table with the record player is the cover of Sonny Rollins and the Contemporary Leaders, one of Fagen's favorite albums. On the wall behind, a clock shows 4:09. An advertisement in Billboard shortly before the album's release set the scene: "At 4:09 a.m., silence and darkness have taken hold of the city. The only sound is the voice of The Nightfly". Fagen appeared on the album cover despite his reclusive nature: "It was an autobiographical album so it seemed like I might as well go public with it." The cover was shot in Fagen's apartment on the Upper East Side of Manhattan by photographer James Hamilton. A second shoot was arranged, as the RCA microphone was facing the wrong direction in the first. Gale Sasson and Vern Yenor are credited with the cover's set design.

In his 2013 memoir Eminent Hipsters, Fagen notes that the cover figure "wasn't supposed to be a stand-in for any particular jazz DJ," but noted several personalities from the period that factored into its creation: Ed Beach, Dan Morgenstern, Martin Williams, R.D. Harlan, Symphony Sid, and what Fagen regarded as his "main man", WEVD's Mort Fega. "He was laid-back, knowledgeable, and forthright, the cool uncle you wished you'd had." At the time of the album's release, he remembered that jazz offered him an escape: "When I saw 'E.T.,' I realized that the E.T. in my bedroom was my Thelonious Monk records. Everything that he represented was totally unworldly in a way, although at the same time, jazz to me seemed more real than the environment in which I was living." The Wall Street Journal's Robert J. Toth writes, "The cover adds another layer of autobiography. On the front, we see Mr. Fagen as a crew-cut deejay on the graveyard shift. On the back is his audience, a single lighted window in a row of tract homes — or maybe the artist as a young man, drinking in inspiration." Critic Robert Palmer continued in this line of thinking: "Inside, there's a teenager with his ear next to a portable radio. He's playing it softly, so his parents won't wake up, and he can barely make out the sounds through the static. [...] The teenager was Donald Fagen."

== Release ==
The Nightfly was released on October 1, 1982, on vinyl and cassette. It was also released in its first prerecorded digital form, via half-inch Beta and VHS format cassettes issued by Mobile Fidelity Sound Lab. In addition, a matching folio for the album was released by Cherry Lane Music in February 1983. It was first widely released on compact disc in 1984; a reader's poll conducted by Digital Audio magazine the following year ranked it among the best releases of the time, alongside Peter Gabriel's 1982 self-titled album (another fully digital recording) and Bruce Springsteen's Born in the U.S.A. (1984). Early CD copies of The Nightfly suffered from being manufactured from third and fourth generation masters. Nichols discovered this when he received a call from Stevie Wonder, who told him that his CD copy sounded "funny." Nichols penned an essay in Recording Engineer and Producer criticizing record companies' apparent carelessness in manufacturing the then-nascent format. The Nightfly was reissued on various disc formats four times, each time with a multichannel mix: on DVD-Audio in 2002, on DualDisc in 2004, on MVI in 2007, and on hybrid multichannel SACD in the Warner Premium Sound series by Warner Japan in 2011.

Following completion of the album, Fagen entered psychotherapy and dropped out of public view. In Eminent Hipsters, he wrote that "the panic attacks I used to get as a kid returned, only now accompanied by morbid thoughts and paranoia, big-time." He remained unable to work for much of the rest of the 1980s, "gobbling antidepressants". He came to view The Nightfly as the culmination of "whatever kind of energy was behind the writing I had been doing in the '70s." He turned down requests for television performances, opting only for radio and press interviews. Though he suggested he might do smaller concerts in New York, Fagen did not tour behind The Nightfly. He expounded upon his mental state after the album's completion:

I wanted to do an autobiographical album, and I really put everything I knew into the Nightfly album. And after that, I wasn't really inspired to do anything. I fell into a bit of a depression for a while. I think, that like a lot of artists, especially in the music business, I was young and successful, and I was basically still an adolescent. I started to address some of these things with The Nightfly, and I got really scared after it was done; I felt I'd exposed myself in a way that I wasn't used to doing, and I kind of retreated psychologically from that.

In 2006, Fagen stated that he had not listened to the album "since I made it."

After reuniting as a touring band in 1993, Steely Dan performed several songs from The Nightfly on occasion; Fagen also did so as a solo artist during a 2006 tour in support of his album Morph the Cat. Steely Dan, with Fagen as the sole original member following Becker's death in 2017, performed The Nightfly in its entirety at the Beacon Theatre in Manhattan and the Orpheum Theatre in Boston in 2019; an official live recording compiled from these performances, Donald Fagen's The Nightfly Live, was released in 2021.

== Critical reception ==
Professional ratings
Review scores
Source	Rating
AllMusic	4.5/5 stars
Chicago Tribune	3.5/4 stars
The Encyclopedia of Popular Music	4/5 stars
The Great Rock Discography	6/10
Pitchfork	9.3/10
Rolling Stone	4/5 stars
The Rolling Stone Album Guide	4/5 stars
Smash Hits	8/10
Uncut	9/10
The Village Voice	A

The Nightfly was met with critical acclaim. Billboard labeled it their top album pick in the first month of its release, calling it a "stunning debut" and praising its "crew of crack [session] players and crisp digital production." David Fricke wrote in Rolling Stone that "Donald Fagen conjures a world where all things are possible, even to a kid locked in his bedroom." Robert Christgau, writing for The Village Voice, gave the album an A and commented: "these songs are among Fagen's finest [...] his acutely shaded lyrics put the jazziest music he's ever committed to vinyl into a context that like everything here is loving but very clear-eyed." Robert Palmer of The New York Times called it a "vivid and frequently ingenious look back at a world that is gone forever. Its sound is glossy and contemporary, but references to both the spirit and the music of the years when Mr. Fagen was growing up can be found in almost every song." Charles Shaar Murray of NME called The Nightfly "an album which doesn't so much dilute the arctic smartassery of the Dan as warm it up, loosen it up, and present it in a new context."

In The Boston Phoenix, Howard Hampton gave a mixed review, praising "I.G.Y." but feeling that the rest of the album, "though exceptional in places, just hasn't that transcendental kick of this song." Paul Strange of Melody Maker dubbed the album a "bummer. What made the Dan an important band of the early '70s has been replaced by ultra-slick, uninspired background mush."

Retrospective reviews have remained positive. Jon Matsumoto picked it for a "Classic of the Week" editorial in the Los Angeles Times in 1994, calling it an "elegant pop album" and praising its "vivid lyrical tapestry" and "rhythmically effervescent" music. Jason Ankeny of AllMusic regarded The Nightfly as a continuation of "the smooth pop-jazz mode favored on the final Steely Dan records" and "lush and shimmering, produced with cinematic flair by Gary Katz; romanticized but never sentimental... crafted with impeccable style and sophistication." Bud Scoppa wrote that the album and its successors Kamakiriad and Morph the Cat are "united not just by their sophistication but also by a sense of nostalgia for what has been irretrievably lost." The Nightfly is described as a "superb jazz-pop solo album" in Pete Prown and HP Newquist's 1997 book Legends of Rock Guitar. Jazz historian Ted Gioia cites it as an example of Steely Dan "proving that pop-rock could equally benefit from a healthy dose of jazz" during their original tenure, which coincided with a period when rock musicians frequently experimented with jazz idioms and techniques.

=== Accolades ===
The Nightfly was nominated for seven awards at the 25th Annual Grammy Awards in 1983, including Album of the Year and Best Engineered Recording – Non-Classical. "I.G.Y." was nominated for Song of the Year, Best Pop Vocal Performance, Male, and Best Instrumental Arrangement Accompanying Vocal(s), while "Ruby Baby" received a nomination for Best Vocal Arrangement. Katz was nominated for Producer of the Year. In 2000, The Nightfly was voted number 288 in Colin Larkin's All Time Top 1000 Albums, and in 2006, it was included in Robert Dimery's 1001 Albums You Must Hear Before You Die. L'Osservatore Romano, the daily newspaper of Vatican City, selected The Nightfly as one of its "Top 10 Albums" in 2010.

== Commercial performance ==
The Nightfly debuted on Billboard's Rock Albums chart at number 39 during the week ending October 23, 1982, peaking at number 25 on November 13. It debuted on the magazine's all-genre Top LPs and Tape chart on October 30 at number 45; it reached number 11, its peak, on November 27. It also charted on Billboard's Black LPs chart, peaking at number 24. In Norway, it reached number seven on the album charts. In Sweden and New Zealand, the album peaked at numbers eight and nine, respectively. The Nightfly underperformed Gaucho commercially, and Fagen felt that the label did not market it properly or effectively. The Boston radio station WBCN, inspired by the album cover, developed a promotion in which listeners could register to host their own radio show.

== Legacy ==
The Nightfly remains a favorite among audiophiles for its high production value. According to Paul Tingen in Sound on Sound, it was "for years a popular demonstration record in hi-fi stores across the globe". Paul White, editor-in-chief of Sound on Sound, felt it "is always a good reference for checking out monitoring systems and shows what good results could be obtained from those early digital recording systems in the right hands". Clive Young of Pro Sound News called "I.G.Y." the "Free Bird" of pro audio, claiming that almost every live sound engineer used it to test front of house sound systems. EQ Magazine ranked The Nightfly among the "Top 10 Best Recorded Albums of All Time", alongside albums such as the Beatles' Sgt. Pepper's Lonely Hearts Club Band and the Beach Boys' Pet Sounds.

== Track listing ==
All tracks are written by Donald Fagen, except where noted.

Side one
No.	Title	Writer(s)	Length
1.	"I.G.Y."		6:03
2.	"Green Flower Street"		3:42
3.	"Ruby Baby"	Jerry Leiber, Mike Stoller; arranged by Fagen	5:38
4.	"Maxine"		3:50

Side two
No.	Title	Length
5.	"New Frontier"	6:23
6.	"The Nightfly"	5:47
7.	"The Goodbye Look"	4:50
8.	"Walk Between Raindrops"	2:38

== Personnel ==
Adapted from the album's liner notes.

- Donald Fagen – lead vocals (1–8), backing vocals (3–8), synthesizers (1, 2, 5–7), "synth blues harp" (1), organ (3, 4, 7, 8), electric piano (3, 4, 8), piano (6), horn arrangements
- Rob Mounsey – synthesizers (1, 2, 6), horn arrangements
- Greg Phillinganes – electric piano (1, 2, 7), clavinet (2), piano solo (3), piano (4), synthesizers (7), synthesizer bass (8)
- Michael Omartian – piano (3, 5), electric piano (5, 6)
- Hugh McCracken – guitar (1, 3, 6), harmonica (5)
- Rick Derringer – guitar (1, 3, 6)
- Dean Parks – guitar (2, 7)
- Larry Carlton – lead guitar (2, 3, 5–7), guitar (4, 8)
- Steve Khan – acoustic guitar (7)
- Anthony Jackson – bass (1, 3)
- Chuck Rainey – bass (2)
- Marcus Miller – bass (4, 6, 7)
- Abraham Laboriel – bass (5)
- Will Lee – bass (8)
- James Gadson – drums (1), additional drums (3)
- Jeff Porcaro – additional drums (1), drums (2, 3, 6, 7)
- Ed Greene – drums (4, 5)
- Steve Jordan – drums (8)
- Starz Vanderlocket – percussion (1, 2, 7), backing vocals (5)
- Roger Nichols – percussion (1)
- David Tofani – alto saxophone (1, 4)
- Michael Brecker – tenor saxophone (1, 3, 4)
- Ronnie Cuber – baritone saxophone (1, 4)
- Dave Bargeron – trombone (1), euphonium (4)
- Randy Brecker – trumpet (1, 3), flugelhorn (3, 4)
- Valerie Simpson – backing vocals (1–4, 6, 7)
- Zack Sanders – backing vocals (1, 2, 6)
- Frank Floyd – backing vocals (1, 2, 6)
- Gordon Grody – backing vocals (1)
- Daniel Lazerus – backing vocals (2)
- Lesley Miller – backing vocals (8)

=== Technical ===
- Produced by Gary Katz
- Chief engineer – Roger Nichols
- Overdub engineer – Daniel Lazerus
- Tracking and mixdown engineer – Elliot Scheiner
- Sequencing, percussion and special effects – Roger Nichols and WENDEL II
- Digital maintenance – Wayne Yurgelun and Mike Morongell (Soundworks); Bill Roach and Jiri Donovsky (3M)
- Assistant engineers – Wayne Yurgelun, Mike Morongell, Cheryl Smith, and Robin Lane
- Mastered by Bob Ludwig at Masterdisk, New York City
- Set design and construction – Gale Sasson and Vern Yenor
- Art direction – George Delmerico
- Photography – James Hamilton

== Charts ==
=== Weekly charts ===
Chart (1982–2006)	Peak position
Australian (Kent Music Report)|	19
Canada 100 Albums (RPM)	25
German Albums (Offizielle Top 100)	56
Dutch Albums (Album Top 100)	16
New Zealand Albums (RMNZ)	9
Norwegian Albums (VG-lista)	6
Swedish Albums (Sverigetopplistan)	8
UK Albums (Official Charts)	44
US Billboard 200	11
US Top R&B/Hip-Hop Albums (Billboard)	24
US Top Rock Albums (Billboard)	8

=== Year-end charts ===
Chart (1983)	Position
US Billboard 200	99

== Certifications ==
Region	Certification	Certified units/sales
United Kingdom (BPI)	Platinum	300,000^{^}
United States (RIAA)	Platinum	1,000,000^{^}
^{^} Shipments figures based on certification alone.

== Sources ==
- Sweet, Brian (2015). Steely Dan: Reelin' in the Years. Overlook-Omnibus. ISBN 978-1-4683-1314-7.
- Fagen, Donald (2013). Eminent Hipsters. Viking. ISBN 978-0-670-02551-0.
