= Snowbound (song) =

Single by Donald Fagen and Walter Becker

from the album Kamakiriad
- B-side: "Big Noise, New York" (NA); "Trans-Island Skyway" (EU)
- Released: December 1993
- Recorded: 1992–1993
- Genre: Jazz-rock
- Length: 7:08
- Label: Warner Bros. Records / Wea
- Songwriters: Donald Fagen; Walter Becker
- Producer: Walter Becker

Donald Fagen and Walter Becker singles chronology
"Trans-Island Skyway" (1993)	"Snowbound" (1993)	"Countermoon" (1993)

"Snowbound" is the fourth track from Donald Fagen's second solo album Kamakiriad.

== Background ==
"Snowbound" continues the concept story as laid out in Kamakiriad, a journey in a dream car set in a futuristic time. The song focuses on a city with chronically bad weather, and poor icy road conditions. The narrator of the song gets stuck in the city, yet doesn't focus on the poor conditions, but instead begins to relish a decadent lifestyle of living carefree within the city.

== Music video ==
The video is a combination of stop motion and real time footage, produced by Michel Gondry. Real time footage of musician's and actor's heads was superimposed onto models. These models were then set into a modeled futuristic city with atmospheric effects added in post production. The music video was also featured on Beavis and Butt-Head, in the short Madame Blavatsky.

=== Story ===
The story depicted in the video centers on worker drones living and working in a cluttered, gray city, and living in an oppressive red haze. Juxtaposed onto the harsh drabness of their robotically efficient existence is a soft falling snow. Donald Fagen's face is visible throughout much of the video as an overlord like figure, watching each drone's every move. The video itself spotlights one particular man drone and woman drone, however the centerpiece of the video occurs when an inefficient, napping drone gets zapped with electricity by Donald Fagen from his watch point above the city. The zapped drone becomes angry and drives up to the watch point to fight Fagen resulting in his being tossed out of the watch point. The drone then efficiently steps into Fagen's position, becoming the new overlord. The video ends with the man and woman drones going together into the same house at the end of the day.
