= Gaucho (album) =

Studio album by Steely Dan
- Released: November 21, 1980
- Recorded: 1978–1980
- Studios: Soundworks (New York City); A&R (New York City); Sigma Sound (New York City); Automated Sound (New York City); Village Recorder (Los Angeles); Producer's Workshop (Hollywood)
- Genres: Jazz rock; jazz pop; yacht rock; space age pop; smooth jazz; cool jazz; West Coast jazz
- Length: 38:02
- Label: MCA
- Producer: Gary Katz

Steely Dan chronology
Aja (1977)	Gaucho (1980)	Alive in America (1995)

Singles from Gaucho
- 1. "Hey Nineteen" Released: November 21, 1980; 2. "Time Out of Mind" Released: March 14, 1981 (US); 3. "Babylon Sisters" Released: March 1981 (UK)

Gaucho is the seventh studio album by the American rock band Steely Dan, released on November 21, 1980, by MCA Records. The album marked a significant stylistic shift for the band, with more focus on rhythm and atmosphere than their earlier work, but the recording sessions demonstrated the group's typical obsessive nature and perfectionism, as they used at least 42 different session musicians, spent over a year in the studio, and far exceeded the original monetary advance given by the record label. At the 24th Annual Grammy Awards, Gaucho won Best Engineered Recording – Non-Classical, and was nominated for Album of the Year and Best Pop Performance by a Duo or Group with Vocals.

The making of the album was plagued by creative, personal, and professional problems, and, once it was completed, there was a three-way legal battle between MCA, Warner Bros., and Steely Dan over the rights to release it. After the album was released, jazz pianist Keith Jarrett sued Walter Becker and Donald Fagen for copyright infringement, claiming the title track plagiarized "'Long As You Know You're Living Yours" from his 1974 album Belonging, and he was given a co-writing credit. Steely Dan did not release another studio album until Two Against Nature, nearly 20 years later.

== Background ==
Exceptional difficulties plagued the production of Gaucho. By 1978, Walter Becker and Donald Fagen had established themselves as the only two permanent members of Steely Dan and were using a revolving cast of session musicians to record the songs they wrote together. However, the pair's working relationship began to become strained, largely because of Becker's escalating drug use.

During the course of the recording sessions for Gaucho, Becker was hit by a car late one Saturday night while walking home to his apartment on the Upper West Side. He managed to push the woman he was with out of harm's way, but sustained multiple fractures in one leg, a sprain in the other leg, and other injuries. During his six-month recovery, he suffered from secondary infections. While Becker was in the hospital, he and Fagen continued their musical collaborations via telephone.

Becker's personal problems continued to mount when his girlfriend, Karen Roberta Stanley, died of a drug overdose at his home on January 30, 1980. Her family sued Becker for $17.5 million in January 1981, claiming that he had introduced Stanley to cocaine, morphine, barbiturates, and heroin. The court later ruled in Becker's favor.

== Recording ==
=== Recording sessions ===
Steely Dan's first four albums were recorded entirely in Los Angeles, but starting with 1976's The Royal Scam, Becker and Fagen began to record in New York City as well as L.A., and sessions for Gaucho began in New York in 1978. Many of the session musicians enlisted to play on the album were unenthusiastic about Becker and Fagen's increasingly obsessive, perfectionist recording style. Mark Knopfler of Dire Straits, who was hired to play the guitar solo on "Time Out of Mind" on the strength of his playing on his band’s hit single "Sultans of Swing", described the session as long and gruelling. His playing features on more than half of the final track, though a commonly repeated myth states that his playing is only audible for about 15 seconds. Becker did not perform on the tracks "Babylon Sisters", "Glamour Profession", "My Rival", or "Third World Man".

The album's mixing proved to be just as difficult as the recording. As an example, it took Becker, Fagen, recording engineer Roger Nichols, and producer Gary Katz more than 55 attempts to complete a satisfactory mix of the 50-second fade out of "Babylon Sisters".

=== Drum recording ===
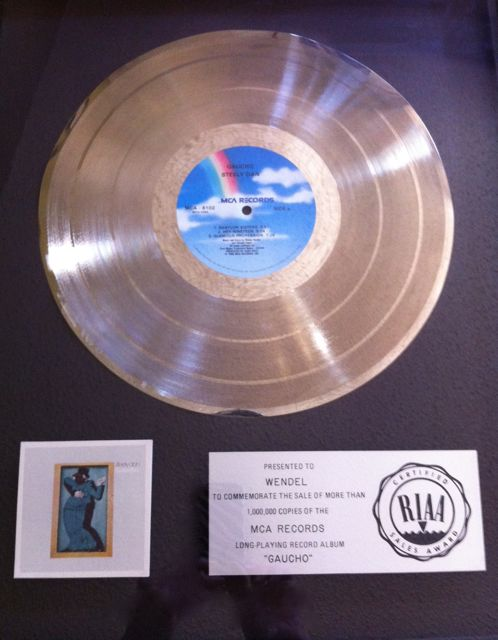
The Platinum record awarded to "Wendel", the drum machine used on Gaucho, which was invented by recording engineer Roger Nichols.

Even though the session musicians who played on Gaucho were amongst the most talented from both the East and West Coasts, Becker and Fagen were still not satisfied with the basic tracks for some of the songs, particularly with regard to the timing of the drum tracks. In a 2006 interview for Sound on Sound, Fagen stated that he and Becker said to Nichols:

"'It's too bad that we can't get a machine to play the beat we want, with full-frequency drum sounds, and to be able to move the snare drum and kick drum around independently.' Nichols replied 'I can do that.' This was back in 1978 or something, so we said 'You can do that???' To which he said 'Yes, all I need is $150,000.' So we gave him the money out of our recording budget, and six weeks later he came in with this machine and that is how it all started."

Nichols named the drum machine "Wendel". When Gaucho sold one million copies, the Recording Industry Association of America (RIAA) awarded Wendel its own Platinum record. According to a 2021 interview with recording engineer Elliot Scheiner, who recorded the rhythm section tracks for Gaucho, the Wendel drum machine was used for the basic drum beats on "Hey Nineteen", "Glamour Profession", and "My Rival". Drum fills for these tracks were played live by the drummer credited for the track. Scheiner said in the same interview that "Babylon Sisters", "Time Out of Mind", and "Third World Man" did not use the "Wendel" machine. (Scheiner was not asked about the drums on the title song, "Gaucho".) According to Ken Micallef in an article in Modern Drummer, the drum track for the title song was assembled from 46 different takes. The drummer on the session, Jeff Porcaro, has been quoted as saying:

"From noon till six we'd play the tune over and over and over again, nailing each part. We'd go to dinner and come back and start recording. They made everybody play like their life depended on it. But they weren't gonna keep anything anyone else played that night, no matter how tight it was. All they were going for was the drum track."

Porcaro also stated in a 1979 interview that he recorded "all but like three tunes... so far. Knowing them, you may get an album and I won't be on it." Only Porcaro's drumming on the title track was kept.

Drummer Bernard Purdie plays his signature half-time shuffle beat, the "Purdie Shuffle", on "Babylon Sisters".

=== Outtakes and bootlegs ===
A number of songs were written for the album, but not included in the final release. Some of these were included on a bootleg album titled The Lost Gaucho, which features recordings from early in the Gaucho sessions. Song titles include "Kind Spirit", "Kulee Baba", "I Can't Write Home About You", "The Bear", "Talkin' About My Home", and "The Second Arrangement". An early version of "Third World Man", dating from The Royal Scam sessions and with alternate lyrics, is included on The Lost Gaucho under the title "Were You Blind That Day".

"The Second Arrangement" was one of Katz and Nichols' favorite songs from the Gaucho sessions. In late December 1979, after weeks of working on a particular version of the song, approximately three-quarters of the track was accidentally erased by an assistant engineer, who had been asked by Katz to ready it for listening. The band attempted to re-record the track, but eventually abandoned the song entirely, focusing instead, according to Steely Dan biographer Brian Sweet, on "Third World Man". During a guitar clinic in 2011, Larry Carlton said of "Third World Man":

"When Billboard magazine came out ... about Gaucho, it's writing about the news 'Steely Dan released ... bla bla bla ... and great guitar solo by Larry Carlton', and I said, 'but I didn't play on Gaucho!, they'd cut it in New York, I didn't play on it!'. So I found out later: they had finished mixing in New York, and one of the second engineers erased one of their master tracks. So "Third World Man" was in the can from The Royal Scam and they had to reach back into the old tapes and find something to finish the album, and that's how I ended up on Gaucho playing "Third World Man".

Steely Dan did not perform "The Second Arrangement" live until a rarities show on September 17, 2011, and a studio recording of the song has never been officially released, though several demo and outtake recordings of the song exist in bootleg form. In 2020, Cimcie Nichols, the daughter of Roger Nichols, said the family had discovered three cassettes that might include rough mixes of "The Second Arrangement". The possibility proved to be an actuality, and Roger Nichols' tape (and a second DAT version) were preserved in September 2021 and March 2023, and released in June 2023 in the newsletter "Expanding Dan".

== Music and lyrics ==
Gaucho has been described as a jazz rock, jazz pop, yacht rock, space age pop, smooth jazz, cool jazz and West Coast jazz album. According to Mike Powell of Stylus Magazine, Gaucho combines "bitter, poetic cynicism with freewheeling jazz-rock", while Stephen Thomas Erlewine of AllMusic says it "essentially replicates the smooth jazz-pop of Aja, but with none of that record's dark, seductive romance or elegant aura". Similarly, rock historian Joe Stuessy suggested it was one in a series of Steely Dan albums that showed a progression of jazz influences in the band's sound, which was often described as "jazz-rock fusion". Music journalist and broadcaster Paul Sexton wrote that, while Aja had "announced [Steely Dan's] ever-greater exploration of jazz influences", Gaucho is "their yacht rock masterpiece". In connection with the latter genre, Timothy Malcolm of Houstonia magazine said the album features "a number of yachty delights", and Erlewine highlighted the title track as exemplary of the genre. Patrick Hosken of MTV News said that, like Aja, Gaucho shows how "great yacht rock is also more musically ambitious than it might seem, tying blue-eyed soul and jazz to funk and R&B".

Hal Leonard's The Best of Steely Dan describes Gaucho as "a concept album of seven interrelated tales about would-be hipsters." According to Ian MacDonald, "Two songs are about hookers, two more concern the doings of coke dealers, and a fifth depicts the denouement of a seedy marital dispute. What redeems it all is the humour and artistry. Lyrics exude class as well as underclass, while the music, whatever its guise or disguise, is immaculate". The lyrics of "Hey Nineteen" are about an aging hipster attempting to pick up a girl who is so young that she does not recognize "'Retha Franklin" playing on the stereo, and the song closes with the ambiguous line, "The Cuervo Gold, the fine Colombian, make tonight a wonderful thing", leaving it up to the listener whether the narrator is consuming tequila and drugs with the love interest, or if he is alone. Stewart Mason of AllMusic wrote that "Time Out of Mind" is "a barely veiled song about heroin, specifically a young man's first experience with the drug at the hands of a pretentious, pseudo-religious crank talking of 'chasing the dragon' with the 'mystical sphere direct from Lhasa'", and Record World said that the song "offers an aural array of rich keyboard/guitar figures."

=== Keith Jarrett lawsuit ===
Following the release of Gaucho in 1980, it was noticed that Gaucho's title track, credited to Donald Fagen and Walter Becker, bore a resemblance to jazz pianist Keith Jarrett's instrumental "'Long As You Know You're Living Yours" from his 1974 album Belonging. When asked about this during an interview with Musician magazine, Becker replied that he loved the Jarrett composition, while Fagen said "we were heavily influenced by that particular piece of music." After these comments were published, Jarrett sued for copyright infringement, and Becker and Fagen were legally obliged to add his name to the credits and provide Jarrett with publishing royalties.

== Packaging ==
The album's cover art is based upon a low relief sculpture by Argentine artist Israel Hoffmann. Entitled "Guardia Vieja – Tango" (Old Guard – Tango), the original is in a street museum known as Caminito in La Boca, a neighborhood of Buenos Aires, Argentina.

== Marketing and sales ==
MCA made the album, along with Hard Promises by Tom Petty and the Heartbreakers and the Xanadu soundtrack by Olivia Newton-John and Electric Light Orchestra, a test case for its new "superstar pricing" policy, whereby new albums by top-selling artists would sell for one dollar more than those of other artists ($9.98, rather than $8.98). Steely Dan was opposed to this idea, fearful that their fans would blame them for the higher price.

In the United States, Gaucho reached number 9 on the Billboard Top LPs & Tape chart, and it has been certified Platinum by the RIAA. In the UK, the album reached number 27 on the UK Albums Chart. "Hey Nineteen" reached number 10 on the Billboard Hot 100, and reached the Top 10 in Canada.

== Critical reception ==
Professional ratings
Review scores
Source	Rating
AllMusic	4/5 stars
Chicago Tribune	2/4 stars
Christgau's Record Guide	B−
The Encyclopedia of Popular Music	3/5 stars
The Great Rock Discography	6/10
MusicHound Rock	1/5 stars
Pitchfork	9.4/10
Rolling Stone	4.5/5 stars
The Rolling Stone Album Guide	2/5 stars
Tom Hull – on the Web	B+

Upon its release, Gaucho was met with mostly positive reviews. Ariel Swartley of Rolling Stone said: "After years of hibernation in the studio, the metamorphosis that began with The Royal Scam is complete. Steely Dan have perfected the aesthetic of the tease." John Griffin of The Gazette wrote that "The music is perfection throughout" the album. The New York Times gave Gaucho a positive review, and later ranked it ahead of such albums as Remain in Light by Talking Heads and Closer by Joy Division as the best album of 1980.

On the other hand, Pete Bishop of The Pittsburgh Press found Gaucho "too well-crafted, too artificially sophisticated", and lacking in spontaneity. Robert Christgau of The Village Voice remarked that "Even the song with Aretha in it lends credence to rumors that the LP was originally entitled Countdown to Lethargy", referring to "Hey Nineteen" and its lyric about "'Retha Franklin". The album received a rating of 1 star out of 5 in the second edition of The Rolling Stone Album Guide (1983), in which critic Dave Marsh called it "the kind of music that passes for jazz in Holiday Inn lounges, with the kind of lyrics that pass for poetry in freshman English classes."

In a retrospective review, Stephen Thomas Erlewine of AllMusic wrote that Gaucho, while sonically similar to Aja, features musical performances that have been overly rehearsed to the point of lacking emotional resonance, as well as inferior songwriting, except for the highlights "Babylon Sisters", "Time Out of Mind", and "Hey Nineteen", which "make the remainder of the album's glossy, meandering fusion worthwhile". David Sakowski of PopMatters reappraised the album as a "classic" that was largely "lost in the shadow of Aja and the changing tides of music". In 2000, Gaucho was voted number 504 in the third edition of Colin Larkin's book All Time Top 1000 Albums.

=== Accolades ===
At the 24th Annual Grammy Awards, Gaucho won Best Engineered Recording – Non-Classical, and was nominated for Album of the Year and Best Pop Performance by a Duo or Group with Vocals.

== Track listing ==
All tracks are written by Walter Becker and Donald Fagen, except where noted.

Side one
No.	Title	Length
1.	"Babylon Sisters"	5:53
2.	"Hey Nineteen"	5:09
3.	"Glamour Profession"	7:28

Side two
No.	Title	Writer(s)	Length
4.	"Gaucho"	Becker, Fagen, Keith Jarrett	5:31
5.	"Time Out of Mind"		4:13
6.	"My Rival"		4:33
7.	"Third World Man"		5:15
Total length:			38:02

== Personnel ==
Adapted from the album's liner notes.

=== Steely Dan ===
- Donald Fagen – lead vocals (1–7), electric piano (2–5), synthesizer (2–6), organ (6), rhythm arrangements
- Walter Becker – guitars (2, 5), bass (2, 4, 5), guitar solo (4), rhythm arrangements

==== Additional musicians ====
- Don Grolnick – electric piano (1), Clavinet (1), rhythm arrangements
- Rob Mounsey – piano (3–5), synthesizer (7), horn arrangements (1, 3–5), rhythm arrangements
- Pat Rebillot – electric piano (6)
- Joe Sample – electric piano (7)
- Steve Khan – guitars (1, 3, 4, 7), guitar solo (6), acoustic guitar (7)
- Hugh McCracken – guitars (2, 5)
- Mark Knopfler – guitar solo (5)
- Hiram Bullock – guitars (6)
- Rick Derringer – guitars (6)
- Larry Carlton – guitar solo (7)
- Chuck Rainey – bass (1, 7)
- Anthony Jackson – bass (3, 6)
- Bernard Purdie – drums (1)
- Rick Marotta – drums (2, 5)
- Steve Gadd – drums (3, 6, 7), percussion (2)
- Jeff Porcaro – drums (4)
- Victor Feldman – percussion (2)
- Errol "Crusher" Bennett – percussion (1, 4)
- Ralph MacDonald – percussion (3, 6)
- Nicholas Marrero – timbales (6)
- Tom Scott – alto saxophone (1), tenor saxophone (1, 3, 4, 6), clarinet (1), Lyricon (3, 6), horn arrangements (3, 4, 6)
- Michael Brecker – tenor saxophone (3, 5, 6)
- David Sanborn – alto saxophone (5)
- Randy Brecker – trumpet (1, 4, 5), flugelhorn (1, 6)
- Dave Tofani – tenor saxophone (5)
- Ronnie Cuber – baritone saxophone (5)
- George Marge – bass clarinet (1)
- Walter Kane – bass clarinet (1)
- Wayne Andre – trombone (6)
- Toni Wine – backing vocals (1)
- Lani Groves – backing vocals (1)
- Diva Gray – backing vocals (1)
- Gordon Grody – backing vocals (1)
- Lesley Miller – backing vocals (1, 3–5)
- Patti Austin – backing vocals (1, 4, 5)
- Frank Floyd – backing vocals (2, 3, 6)
- Zack Sanders – backing vocals (2, 3, 6)
- Valerie Simpson – backing vocals (3–6)
- Michael McDonald – backing vocals (5)
- Paul Griffin – rhythm arrangements

=== Technical ===
Original release

- Produced by Gary Katz
- Executive engineer – Roger Nichols
- Tracking engineers – Elliot Scheiner and Bill Schnee
- Overdub engineers – Roger Nichols and Jerry Garszva
- Mixed by Elliot Scheiner
- Sequencing and special effects – Roger Nichols and WENDEL
- Assistant engineers – Barbara Isaak, Tom Greto, Georgia Offrell, John "Doc" Dougherty, Carla Bandini, Craig Goetsch, Gerry Gabinelli, Rosa Howell, John Potoker, Marti Robertson, Linda Randazzo
- Mastered by Bob Ludwig at Masterdisk (New York City, NY)
- Piano technician – Don Farrar
- Italian translation – Victor di Suvero (one line of track 7)
- Cash – Leonard Freedman
- Clout – Front Line Management
- Art direction and design – Suzanne Walsh
- Design assistant – John Tom Cohoe
- Photography – René Burri/Magnum

Reissue

- Executive producer – Paul Bishow
- Produced by Andy McKaie
- Remastered by Roger Nichols
- Production coordinator – Beth Stempel
- Art direction – Vartan
- Design – Michael Diehl
- Consultant – Daniel Levitin

== Charts ==
=== Weekly charts ===
Weekly chart performance for Gaucho
Chart (1980–1981)	Peak position
Australian Albums (Kent Music Report)	9
Canada Top Albums/CDs (RPM)	18
Dutch Albums (Album Top 100)	44
German Albums (Offizielle Top 100)	57
New Zealand Albums (RMNZ)	7
Norwegian Albums (VG-lista)	5
Swedish Albums (Sverigetopplistan)	15
UK Albums (Official Charts)	27
US Billboard 200	9
US Top R&B/Hip-Hop Albums (Billboard)	19

=== Year-end charts ===
Year-end chart performance for Gaucho
Chart (1981)	Position
Canada Top Albums/CDs (RPM)	86
New Zealand Albums (RMNZ)	42
US Billboard 200	29

== Certifications ==
Certifications for Gaucho
Region	Certification	Certified units/sales
Australia (ARIA)	Platinum	50,000^{^}
New Zealand (RMNZ)	Gold	7,500^{^}
United States (RIAA)	Platinum	1,000,000^{^}
^{^} Shipments figures based on certification alone.
