= I Got a Woman and Some Blues =

Studio album by George Benson
- Released: 1984
- Recorded: April 30, May 20, June 4, August 19 & 20, and September 3, 1969
- Studio: Van Gelder Studio, Englewood Cliffs
- Genre: Jazz
- Length: 29:50
- Label: A&M/CTI; SP 3025
- Producer: Creed Taylor

George Benson chronology
Pacific Fire (1983)	I Got a Woman and Some Blues (1984)	20/20 (1985)

I Got a Woman and Some Blues is the 21st album by American guitarist George Benson featuring performances recorded in 1969 but not released on the A&M label until 1984.

== Reception ==
The Allmusic review states "the great guitarist always comes through with something worth hearing when asked".

Professional ratings
Review scores
Source	Rating
Allmusic	2.5/5 stars

== Track listing ==
1. "I Got a Woman" (Ray Charles, Renald Richard) – 5:01
2. "Out of the Blue" (Henry Nemo, Will Jason) – 3:18
3. "Bluesadelic" (George Benson) – 4:14
4. "Durham's Turn" (George Benson) – 4:06
5. "Good Morning Blues" (Billy Vera) – 2:53
6. "I Worry 'Bout You" (Norman Mapp) – 2:28
7. "Without Her" (Harry Nilsson) – 2:38
8. "She Went a Little Bit Farther" (Mack Vickery, Merle Kilgore) – 3:08
9. "Goodbye, Columbus" (Jim Yester) – 2:04

Recorded on April 30 (9), June 4 (5–8), August 19 (1), August 20 (3–4) and September 3 (2), 1969.

== Personnel ==
- George Benson – guitar, vocals
- Luiz Bonfá – guitar (track 2)
- Unnamed musicians – brass, saxophones, acoustic piano, bass, drums
