= Pacific Fire =

Studio album by George Benson
- Released: 1983
- Recorded: July – October 1975
- Studio: Van Gelder Studio, Englewood Cliffs, NJ
- Genre: Soul; funk; jazz; pop
- Length: 37:49
- Label: CTI
- Producer: Creed Taylor

George Benson chronology
In Your Eyes (1983)	Pacific Fire (1983)	I Got a Woman and Some Blues (1984)

Pacific Fire is an archival studio album by George Benson released in 1983 by CTI Records. This album consists of unreleased tracks recorded during the 1975 Good King Bad sessions. It is credited as the final release for CTI before the label temporarily folded until the 1990s. It was given its first ever official CD issue as a Japanese only release in 2017.

== Track listing ==
=== Side one ===
1. "Knock on Wood" (Eddie Floyd, Steve Cropper) – 8:15
2. "Moody's Mood" (James Moody, Eddie Jefferson) – 6:26
3. "Bandoleros Caballa" (Ronnie Foster) – 3:42

=== Side two ===
1. "Melodia Español" (Benson, Hubert Laws) – 4:38
2. "Pacific Fire" (Ronnie Foster) – 6:58
3. "Let Your Love Come Out" (Ronnie Foster) – 2:31
4. "Em" (Philip Namanworth) (originally included on Good King Bad) – 5:19

== Personnel ==
- George Benson – lead guitar, arrangements (2, 4)
- Eric Gale – rhythm guitar
- Ronnie Foster – keyboards, acoustic piano solo (5), arrangements (3, 5, 6)
- Don Grolnick – keyboards
- Roland Hanna – keyboards, acoustic piano solo (2)
- Bobby Lyle – keyboards
- Gary King – electric bass, arrangements (7)
- Dennis Davis – drums
- Steve Gadd – drums
- Andy Newmark – drums
- Sue Evans – percussion
- Michael Brecker – saxophone, flute, woodwinds
- Ronnie Cuber – saxophone, flute, woodwinds
- Joe Farrell – saxophone, flute, woodwinds
- Romeo Penque – saxophone, flute, woodwinds
- David Sanborn – saxophone, flute, woodwinds
- David Tofani – saxophone, flute, woodwinds
- Frank Vicari – saxophone, flute, woodwinds
- Hubert Laws – flute solo (4)
- Fred Wesley – trombone solo (1, 5)
- Randy Brecker – trumpet
- Dave Matthews – arrangements (1)

=== Production ===
- Creed Taylor – producer
- Rudy Van Gelder – engineer
- Chuck Stewart – photography
- Blake Taylor – artwork, design
