= Kamakiriad =

Studio album by Donald Fagen
- Released: May 25, 1993
- Recorded: 1990–1993
- Studios: River Sound (New York City); Hyperbolic Sound (Maui); Clinton Recording (New York City); The Hit Factory (New York City)
- Genre: Jazz rock
- Length: 50:31
- Label: Reprise
- Producer: Walter Becker

Donald Fagen chronology
The Nightfly (1982)	Kamakiriad (1993)	Morph the Cat (2006)

Singles from Kamakiriad
- 1. "Tomorrow's Girls" Released: 1993; 2. "Trans-Island Skyway" Released: 1993; 3. "Snowbound" Released: 1993

Professional ratings
Review scores
Source	Rating
AllMusic	3/5 stars
Robert Christgau	(3-star Honorable Mention)
The Encyclopedia of Popular Music	4/5 stars
Entertainment Weekly	B−
The Great Rock Discography	7/10
Los Angeles Times	3.5/4 stars
NME	7/10 stars
Q	4/5 stars
Rolling Stone	3/5 stars
Uncut	8/10

Kamakiriad is the second solo album by Steely Dan artist Donald Fagen, released in 1993. It was nominated for a Grammy Award for Album of the Year 1994.

== Overview ==
The album was the second collaboration between Donald Fagen and Walter Becker since Steely Dan's disbandment in early 80's (the previous was on Rosie Vela's album Zazu). Becker played guitar and bass and produced the album.

The album is a futuristic, optimistic eight-song cycle about the journey of the narrator in his high-tech car, the Kamakiri (Japanese for praying mantis). In the album's liner notes, it reads "Kamakiriad is an album of eight related songs. The literal action takes place a few years in the future, near the millennium. In the first song, "Trans-Island Skyway," the narrator tells us he is about to embark on a journey in his new dream-car, a custom-tooled Kamakiri. It's built for the new century: steam-driven, with a self-contained vegetable garden and a radio link with the Tripstar routing satellite. The next six songs describe his adventures along the way. In the last song, "Teahouse on the Tracks," the narrator lands in dismal Flytown where he must decide whether to bail out or to rally and continue moving into the unknown."

== Promotion ==
Music videos were produced for "Tomorrow's Girls" (starring Rick Moranis) and "Snowbound" (directed by Michel Gondry using stop motion animation). According to The Arizona Republic, the music video for "Snowbound" was filmed on September 6, 1993, at C.J.S. Film Studios in Avondale, Arizona, during Steely Dan's tour stop in Phoenix.

In August 1993, Fagen and Becker embarked on their first tour as Steely Dan since July 1974, which also supported the album.

== Track listing ==
All tracks are written by Donald Fagen, with additional writers noted.

No.	Title	Writer(s)	Length
1.	"Trans-Island Skyway"		6:30
2.	"Countermoon"		5:05
3.	"Springtime"		5:06
4.	"Snowbound"	Walter Becker	7:08
5.	"Tomorrow's Girls"		6:17
6.	"Florida Room"	Libby Titus	6:02
7.	"On the Dunes"		8:07
8.	"Teahouse on the Tracks"		6:09

=== Bonus tracks (from The Nightfly Trilogy MVI boxed set) ===
No.	Title	Length
9.	"Big Noise, New York"	5:21
10.	"Confide in Me"	4:15
11.	"Blue Lou"	7:01
12.	"Shanghai Confidential"	4:54

== Personnel ==
=== Musicians ===
- Donald Fagen – vocals, keyboards, horn and rhythm arrangements
- Walter Becker – bass, guitar solos
- Georg Wadenius – guitar
- Paul Griffin – Hammond B3 organ
- Christopher Parker – drums (1, 2, 6, 7)
- Leroy Clouden – drums (3, 5, 8), percussion
- Dennis McDermott – drums (4)
- Bashiri Johnson – percussion
- Randy Brecker – trumpet, flugelhorn
- Cornelius Bumpus – tenor saxophone, saxophone solo (6, 7)
- Ronnie Cuber – baritone saxophone
- Illinois Elohainu – tenor saxophone, saxophone solo (2)
- Lawrence Feldman – tenor saxophone, flute
- Birch Johnson – trombone, trombone solo (8)
- Lou Marini – alto saxophone, flute, clarinet
- Jim Pugh – trombone
- Roger Rosenberg – baritone saxophone
- Alan Rubin – trumpet, flugelhorn
- David Tofani – flute, tenor saxophone
- Frank Floyd – backing vocals
- Diane Garisto – backing vocals
- Amy Helm – backing vocals
- Mindy Jostyn – backing vocals
- Brenda King – backing vocals
- Curtis King – backing vocals
- Jenni Muldaur – backing vocals
- Angela Clemmons-Patrick – backing vocals
- Catherine Russell – backing vocals
- Dian Sorel – backing vocals
- Fonzi Thornton – backing vocals

=== Technical ===
- Produced by Walter Becker
- Chief engineer – Roger Nichols
- House engineer – Wayne Yurgelun
- Additional engineers – David Michael Dill, Tom Fritze, Dave Russell, Tony Volante
- Second engineers – Jay Ryan, Phil Burnett, John Neff, Troy Halderson, Bob Mitchel, Andy Grassi
- Digital technician – Phil Burnett
- Mastered by Glenn Meadows at Masterfonics, Nashville
- Production assistant – Scott Barkham
- Production coordinator – Lisa Starr
- Sample editing, digital delay acquisition – Craig Siegal
- Design – Carol Bobolts/Red Herring Design
- Photography – James Hamilton
- Car photography – Marinella Terziotti
- Management – Craig Fruin/HK Management

== Charts ==
=== Weekly charts ===
Weekly chart performance for Kamakiriad
Chart (1993)	Peak position
Australian Albums (ARIA)	80
Canada Top Albums/CDs (RPM)	23
Dutch Albums (Album Top 100)	13
German Albums (Offizielle Top 100)	24
New Zealand Albums (RMNZ)	30
Norwegian Albums (VG-lista)	10
Swedish Albums (Sverigetopplistan)	9
Swiss Albums (Schweizer Hitparade)	27
UK Albums (Official Charts)	3
US Billboard 200	10

=== Year-end charts ===
1993 year-end chart performance for Kamakiriad
Chart (1993)	Position
European Albums (European Top 100 Albums)	99

== Certifications ==
Certifications for Kamakiriad
Region	Certification	Certified units/sales
Japan (RIAJ)	Gold	100,000^{^}
United Kingdom (BPI)	Gold	100,000^{^}
United States (RIAA)	Gold	500,000^{^}
^{^} Shipments figures based on certification alone.
