= New Frontier (song) =

Single by Donald Fagen

from the album The Nightfly
- B-side: "Maxine"
- Released: January 1983
- Genre: Jazz-funk
- Length: 3:50 (single); 6:23 (album)
- Label: Warner Bros.
- Songwriter: Donald Fagen
- Producer: Gary Katz

Donald Fagen singles chronology
"I.G.Y. (What a Beautiful World)" (1982)	"New Frontier" (1983)	"Ruby Baby" (1983)

Music video
- "New Frontier" on YouTube

"New Frontier" is a song recorded by American singer-songwriter Donald Fagen for his debut studio album, The Nightfly (1982). The song was released as the second single from the album in January 1983 through Warner Bros. Records. The song received acclaim from music critics.

"New Frontier" was less successful on the charts than its predecessor "I.G.Y. (What a Beautiful World)", however, reaching number 70 on the Billboard Hot 100 in the US. It performed better in the Netherlands, reaching number 47. Its music video—which combined animation and live-action—was in rotation on early MTV and HBO's Video Jukebox.

== Summary ==
The song, set in the early 1960s, centers on teenagers finding romance in an underground fallout shelter. It has been described as equally sarcastic and nostalgic in its lyrics. Musically, the song contains elements of jazz and funk.

== Background ==
The narrator of the song is a "gawky teenager circa 1962", who has also been described as a "wannabe hipster." He opens the song with discussion of his family's backyard fallout shelter—which he casually describes as "'just a dugout that my dad built, in case the reds decide to push the button down." The narrator meets a girl at a party in the shelter ("a summer smoker underground"), whom he compares to the actress Tuesday Weld. They bond over the music of jazz pianist Dave Brubeck, as he attempts to entice her back to the shelter for a "private party." The teenager also holds big dreams for his future: "I can't wait till I move to the city, 'till I finally make up my mind to learn design and study overseas."

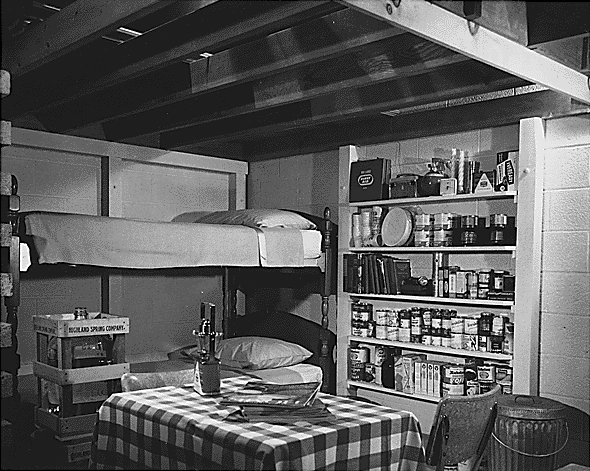
Idealized American fallout shelter, around 1957.

The song's title is a reference to New Frontier, a term used by John F. Kennedy in his acceptance speech in the 1960 United States presidential election. "We stand today on the edge of a New Frontier—the frontier of the 1960s, the frontier of unknown opportunities and perils, the frontier of unfilled hopes and unfilled threats," Kennedy said. Robert J. Toth of The Wall Street Journal considered that Fagen used the term humorously as a "metaphor for the mysteries of sex and adulthood." Musically, the song has been described as "futuristic jazz-funk" by Rolling Stone contributor Kevin O'Donnell. It contains a "four-note piano riff that functions as a sort of musical exclamation point to certain lines in the verses." Toth wrote that "the music sounds as frenetic as the teenage hero's hormones, and its deliberately cheesy tone matches the kid's skin-deep sophistication."

== Critical reception ==
"New Frontier"
The song's first verse, in which Fagen describes his father's fallout shelter

"New Frontier" received critical acclaim. Billboard labeled it a top single pick, with an unspecified writer commenting, "The lyrics are diffuse and unsettling, but Fagen wraps them in a comfortable, shuffling rhythm and layered harmonies for an overall pleasant effect." The Independent's Phil Johnson called the song a "sardonic take on the optimism of America in the Cold War period," while Laura Sinagra from The New York Times a "biting Reagan-era recollection of 60's hope." Jon Matsumoto at the Los Angeles Times considered it "rhythmically effervescent," feeling it "captured both the anxieties and the innocence of the era." Stewart Mason, writing for AllMusic, praised the dual sarcasm and nostalgia of Fagen's lyrics, as well as its "easy, bouncy groove", summarizing it as "one of Fagen's most delightful tunes."

== Music video ==
The music video for "New Frontier" was produced, for Cucumber Studios, by Annabel Jankel and was directed by Rocky Morton. The music video continues the song's concept of a teenage romantic evening in a bomb shelter. It mixes animation and live-action footage. Fagen appears only in a poster for The Nightfly seen on the wall of the bunker. Stewart Mason of AllMusic said the clip for the song was "widely considered one of the great videos of the early MTV era." It was later included as a bonus feature on the DVD-Audio reissue of The Nightfly.

== Formats and track listing ==
7" (1983)

1. "New Frontier" – 3:50
2. "Maxine" – 3:50

12" (1983)

1. "New Frontier" – 3:50
2. "Maxine" – 3:50
3. "The Goodbye Look" – 4:47

CDV maxi single (1988)

1. "New Frontier" (7" Version) – 4:30
2. "Maxine" (LP Version) – 3:50
3. "New Frontier" (Video) – 4:40

== Personnel ==
Information adapted from the liner notes of The Nightfly.

- Donald Fagen – lead vocals, background vocals, synthesizer
- Larry Carlton – lead guitar
- Ed Greene – drums
- Abraham Laboriel – bass
- Hugh McCracken – harmonica
- Michael Omartian – piano, electric piano
- Vander "Stars" Lockett – percussion, background vocals

== Charts ==
Chart (1983)	Peak position
Netherlands (Single Top 100)	47
US Billboard Hot 100	70
US Adult Contemporary (Billboard)	34

== See also ==
- United States in the 1950s
- Time Out-the 1959 Dave Brubeck album was featured prominently on the music video
- Toot, Whistle, Plunk and Boom-1953 Oscar-winning animated short film similar in animation style (and paid homage to) of said music video
- Pablo Picasso-the painting Three Musicians was featured prominently on the music video
- Jazz rock
