= Morph the Cat =

Studio album by Donald Fagen
- Released: March 7, 2006
- Recorded: August 2004 – November 2005
- Studios: Avatar Studios (New York City); Clinton Recording Studios (New York City); Sear Sound (New York City); Sugar Sound (Kauai)
- Genres: Jazz rock; jazz funk
- Length: 52:49
- Label: Reprise
- Producer: Donald Fagen

Donald Fagen chronology
Kamakiriad (1993)	Morph the Cat (2006)	Sunken Condos (2012)

Morph the Cat is the third studio album by American singer-songwriter Donald Fagen. Released on March 7, 2006, to generally positive reviews from critics, Morph the Cat was described by Fagen as his "death album" in an interview with Fred Kaplan of The New York Times. Musicians on the album include drummer Keith Carlock, saxophonist Walt Weiskopf, bassist Freddie Washington, and guitarists Frank Vignola, Jon Herington, Wayne Krantz, and Hugh McCracken.

Professional ratings
Aggregate scores
Source	Rating
Metacritic	83/100
Review scores
Source	Rating
AllMusic	4.5/5 stars
The A.V. Club	B+
Entertainment Weekly	B+
The Guardian	5/5 stars
The Independent	4/5 stars
Los Angeles Times	3/4 stars
Q	3/5 stars
Rolling Stone	3.5/5 stars
Uncut	5/5 stars
USA Today	3/4 stars

== Overview ==
The album is the third installment in Fagen's personal trilogy: The Nightfly about youth, Kamakiriad about midlife, and Morph the Cat about endings. As Fagen spoke of the album, “I’m starting to get older and began to think about mortality a little more. My mother died in 2003 and that was a big shock. When your parents start to die off, that’s going to be a revelation. So for me, this album, although it might sound quite cheery, is really talking a lot about death.” PopMatters expanded on this idea, "Lyrically, Morph the Cat is a logical successor to the first two Donald Fagen solo albums, The Nightfly and Kamakiriad. While Nightfly was set nostalgically in the 1950s and 1960s of Mr. Fagen’s youth, Kamakiriad and Morph are present-tense missives from middle age and late middle age, respectively." The Guardian also described the album's theme of mortality as "blackly appropriate that the funky 'Brite Nitegown' lists three encounters with death: a verse each for sickness, murder and drugs. With razor-sharp horns and Prince-like vocals, it's a killer." In 2006, Fagen also commented that his next project (Sunken Condos, released in 2012) will not be related to these three autobiographical releases, and that "it will be something completely new and it won't be part of this trilogy." The album also has distinct political overtones. Fagen said that "Mary Shut the Garden Door", which depicts a frightening alien invasion, was inspired by the 2004 Republican National Convention in Manhattan and contains allusions to those then in power in the United States. “What I Do” has been described as "a dastardly clever conversation between the ghost of Ray Charles and a young Donald Fagen seeking romantic tips".

== Release ==
Morph the Cat was released on CD and on a CD/DVD-Audio 2-disc package, with a 5.1 surround sound mix engineered by Elliot Scheiner. The surround recording won the Grammy Award for Best Surround Sound Album.

== Track listing ==
All songs written by Donald Fagen.

No.	Title	Length
1.	"Morph the Cat"	6:49
2.	"H Gang"	5:15
3.	"What I Do"	6:01
4.	"Brite Nitegown"	7:16
5.	"The Great Pagoda of Funn"	7:39
6.	"Security Joan"	6:09
7.	"The Night Belongs to Mona"	4:18
8.	"Mary Shut the Garden Door"	6:29
9.	"Morph the Cat (Reprise)"	2:53

== Personnel ==
=== Musicians ===
- Donald Fagen – lead vocals, backing vocals, Fender Rhodes (1, 2, 4, 9), piano (6, 7), organ (6), melodica (8)
- Ted Baker – piano (2, 5), Wurlitzer electric piano (3, 6), Fender Rhodes (7, 8)
- Jon Herington – guitar solo (1, 2, 9), guitar (3–8), guitar chorus solo (9)
- Wayne Krantz – guitar (1–3, 6–9), guitar solo (4, 5)
- Hugh McCracken – guitar (1–3, 9)
- Frank Vignola – guitar (1), guitar tag solo (9)
- Ken Emerson – guitar (3)
- Ken Wessel – guitar solo (6)
- Freddie Washington – bass (1–3, 5–9)
- Harlan Post Jr. – acoustic bass (7)
- Brian Montgomery – remedial bass (9)
- Keith Carlock – drums (1–3, 5–9)
- Gordon Gottlieb – percussion (2, 4, 6, 7)
- Bashiri Johnson – percussion (4)
- Joe Pasaro – percussion (5)
- Phonus Quaver – vibraphone (1, 5, 8, 9), marimba (1, 4, 9)
- Walt Weiskopf – tenor saxophone (1, 2, 7, 9), tenor sax solo (1, 2), alto saxophone (4, 5)
- Roger Rosenberg – baritone saxophone (2, 4, 5), bass clarinet (7)
- Lawrence Feldman – clarinet (2), tenor saxophone (4, 5), flute (7)
- Illinois Elohainu – flutes (8)
- Marvin Stamm – trumpet (1, 2, 4, 5, 7, 9), trumpet solo (5)
- Mark Patterson – trombone (4, 5, 7)
- Howard Levy – harmonica (3, 7), harmonica solo (3)
- Jennifer Battista – handclaps (6)
- Eddie Jackson – handclaps (6)
- Camille Meza – handclaps (6)
- Candice Predham – handclaps (6)
- Jerry Barnes – backing vocals (1, 5, 9)
- Michael Harvey – backing vocals (1, 6, 9)
- Amy Helm – backing vocals (3)
- Carolyn Leonhart – backing vocals (3, 8)
- Cindy Mizelle – backing vocals (3)

=== Technical ===
- Produced by Donald Fagen
- Engineered and mixed by Elliot Scheiner
- Overdub/Pro Tools engineers – T.J. Doherty (at Avatar), Brian Montgomery (at Sear and Sugar Sound)
- Second mix engineer – Brian Montgomery
- Assistant engineers – Eddie Jackson, Jim Keller, Chad Lupo, Steve Mazur, Brian Montgomery, Matt Scheiner, Bryan Smith, Allan Thomas
- Piano technicians – Sam Berd, Wayne Williams
- Drum/guitar technician – Artie Smith
- Music copyist – Gary Blu
- Mastered by Darcy Proper at Sony Mastering (New York, NY)
- Additional mastering – Joseph M. Palmaccio
- Mastering assistant – Maria Triana
- Management – Irving Azoff
- Production coordinators – Jill Dell'Abate and Cindy Osborne
- Production assistant (Hawaii) – Mary Lou Arnold
- Art direction – Jeri Heiden
- Design – Ryan Corey
- Photography – Danny Clinch

== Charts ==
Chart performance for Morph the Cat
Chart (2006)	Peak position
Belgian Albums (Ultratop Flanders)	53
Belgian Albums (Ultratop Wallonia)	68
Canadian Albums (Nielsen SoundScan)	44
Danish Albums (Hitlisten)	39
Dutch Albums (Album Top 100)	23
Finnish Albums (Suomen virallinen lista)	25
French Albums (SNEP)	145
German Albums (Offizielle Top 100)	53
Irish Albums (IRMA)	55
Italian Albums (FIMI)	28
Japanese Albums (Oricon)	24
Norwegian Albums (VG-lista)	8
Scottish Albums (Official Charts)	33
Swedish Albums (Sverigetopplistan)	9
Swiss Albums (Schweizer Hitparade)	27
UK Albums (Official Charts)	35
US Billboard 200	26
US Top Rock Albums (Billboard)	8
US Top Tastemaker Albums (Billboard)	5
