= Hey Nineteen =

Single by Steely Dan

from the album Gaucho
- B-side: "Bodhisattva" (live)
- Released: 21 November 1980 (single)
- Recorded: 1978
- Genre: Jazz fusion; soft rock; pop rock; yacht rock
- Length: 5:09 (album version); 4:31 (7" version)
- Label: MCA
- Songwriters: Walter Becker; Donald Fagen
- Producer: Gary Katz

Steely Dan singles chronology
"Josie" (1978)	"Hey Nineteen" (1980)	"Time Out of Mind" (1981)

Official Audio
- "Hey Nineteen" on YouTube

"Hey Nineteen" is a song by American band Steely Dan from their album Gaucho (1980) that describes an intergenerational seduction. Besides the composing duo of Donald Fagen (lead vocals and keyboards) and Walter Becker (bass and guitar), musicians include Hugh McCracken (guitar), Rick Marotta, Victor Feldman, and Steve Gadd (percussion), and Frank Floyd and Zack Sanders (backing vocals). The song peaked at number 10 on the Billboard Hot 100 (1981) and appeared at number 11 on Top Adult Contemporary charts through 1993.

== Background ==
The song was released as the first single from the band's 1980 album Gaucho, and was produced by Gary Katz. The single's B-side is a 1974 live version of the song "Bodhisattva", with an introduction by an inebriated Jerome Aniton, one of the band's drivers. As described by Bernstein, "Hey Nineteen" would become among the most played at the band's live performances (third, according to Setlist.fm), despite having gone unplayed by Becker and Fagen with their "part[ing of] ways in 1981"; its live performances only began with their reunion in 1993.

== Lyrics and music ==
=== Lyrics ===
According to Will Layman, writing for Popmatters.com, the song "was about a middle-aged man's disappointment with a young lover"; as described by Scott Bernstein for Jambase.com (quoting Songfacts.com). In the song, "an older man is seducing a 19-year-old girl. He’s a bit conflicted... However, on this particular night and with the help of some Cuervo Gold tequila, everything is wonderful."

The narrator of the song is an older man remembering his college days in 1967, when he was popular among the members of his fraternity. He is considering a romantic encounter with a 19-year-old girl with whom he has little in common; for example, she does not recognize a song by "'Retha Franklin". The song ends ambiguously, mentioning "The Cuervo Gold" and "fine Colombian", going on to say that these "make tonight a wonderful thing", again emphasizing the age difference. Hence, as Stewart Mason states in his AllMusic review, the listener is "(quite deliberately)... unclear as to whether the singer's been left alone with "the Cuervo Gold/the fine Colombian"... or whether he's just resorted to getting the girl drunk and stoned enough to stop resisting".

=== Music ===
Walter Becker of Steely Dan described the band's music as "a whole new kind of bizarre concerto music" with the band "doing the very, very best contemporary disco-jazz-funk-space muzak with a reggae twist". In a generally negative review emphasizing this particular song's lyrical choices, Stewart Mason of AllMusic.com describes the song's melody as "lazy", with a "lackadaisical ultra-mellow drift", similarly addressing the song's arrangement, which he refers to as "possibly unconscious self-satire... [that] is so hermetically airtight and studiedly slick that it verges upon the mechanical".

== Charts ==
"Hey Nineteen" peaked at number 10 on the Billboard Hot 100 chart in early 1981, number 11 on the Top Adult Contemporary charts through 1993, and, through 2022, its number 68 on the Billboard Hot R&B/Hip-Hop Songs chart. On the Billboard Hot 100 chart, with a run of 19 weeks, "Hey Nineteen" is tied with "Peg" and "Rikki Don't Lose That Number" for being Steely Dan's longest-running chart hit.

== Personnel ==
The musicians appearing on the song, as credited in the liner notes of Gaucho, are:

- Donald Fagen – lead vocals, electric piano, synthesizer
- Rick Marotta – drums
- Walter Becker – bass guitar, guitar
- Hugh McCracken – guitar
- Victor Feldman, Steve Gadd – percussion
- Frank Floyd, Zack Sanders – backing vocals

== Chart history ==
=== Weekly charts ===
Weekly chart performance for "Hey Nineteen"
Chart (1980–1981)	Peak position
Australia (Kent Music Report)	48
Canada RPM Top Singles	3
New Zealand (RIANZ)	20
US Billboard Hot 100	10
US Billboard Adult Contemporary	11
US Billboard R&B	68
US Cash Box Top 100	10

=== Year-end charts ===
Year-end chart performance for "Hey Nineteen"
Chart (1981)	Rank
Canada	25
US Billboard Hot 100	72
US Cash Box	80
