= Dave Tofani =

American musician and composer

Dave Tofani is an American saxophonist and woodwind player, and composer. As a session musician he has performed on over 500 jazz, pop, and rock recordings such as the clarinet solo on "Say Hello, Wave Goodbye" by Soft Cell. He played in the ensemble at the Simon & Garfunkel 1981 concert in Central Park, identified by Simon as the saxophone soloist that night for Simon's song "Still Crazy After All These Years."

== Discography ==
=== As sideman ===
- Closeup – Frankie Valli (1975)
- Good King Bad – George Benson (1976)
- Never Letting Go – Phoebe Snow (1977)
- Thighs and Whispers – Bette Midler (1979)
- Candi Staton – Candi Staton (1980)
- Naughty – Chaka Khan (1980)
- Double Fantasy – John Lennon, Yoko Ono (1980)
- Aretha – Aretha Franklin (1980)
- Gloria Gaynor – Gloria Gaynor (1982)
- The Nightfly – Donald Fagen (1982)
- Chaka – Chaka Khan (1982)
- I'll Keep On Loving You – Linda Clifford (1982)
- Pacific Fire – George Benson (1983)
- Passionfruit – Michael Franks (1983)
- No Sound But a Heart – Sheena Easton (1987)
- Bulletproof Heart – Grace Jones (1989)
- Am I Not Your Girl? – Sinéad O'Connor (1992)
- Kamakiriad – Donald Fagen (1993)
- Snowfall on the Sahara – Natalie Cole (1999)
- Songs from the Last Century – George Michael (1999)
- Nature Boy: The Standards Album – Aaron Neville (2003)
