= Donald Fagen =

American musician (born 1948)

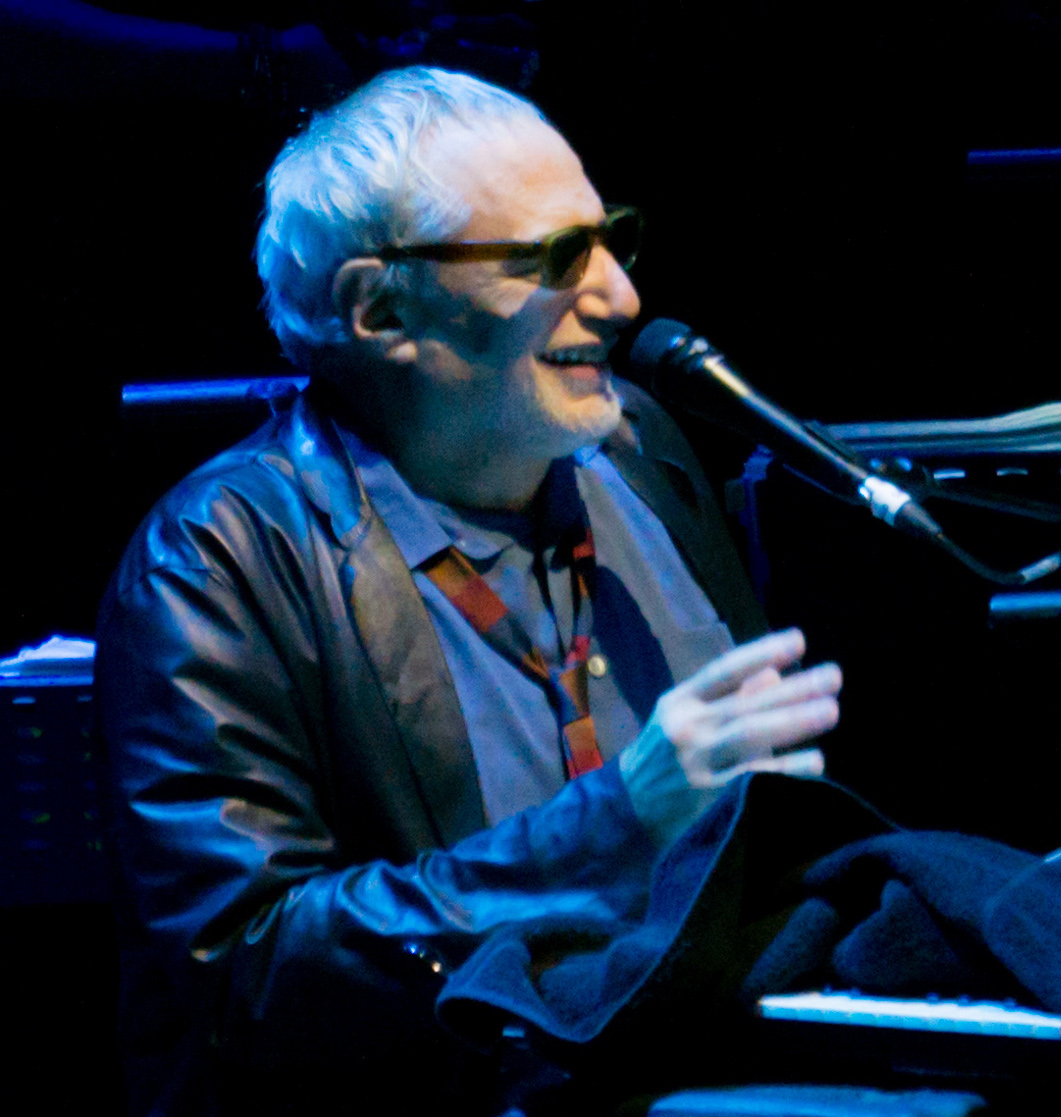
- Fagen in 2017

Background information
- Born: Donald Jay Fagen; January 10, 1948 (age 78); Passaic, New Jersey, U.S.
- Occupations: Musician; songwriter; record producer
- Instruments: Vocals; keyboards
- Years active: 1965–2026
- Labels: ABC; MCA; Giant; Reprise; Warner Bros.
- Formerly of: Steely Dan; The Dukes of September
- Spouse: Libby Titus (m. 1993; died 2024)
- Website: Official Facebook

Donald Jay Fagen (/feɪɡən/, FAY-gən; born January 10, 1948) is an American retired singer-songwriter and musician who was the co-founder, lead singer, co-songwriter, and keyboardist of the rock band Steely Dan, formed in the early 1970s with musical partner Walter Becker. In addition to his contributions to Steely Dan, Fagen has released four solo albums, beginning with The Nightfly in 1982, which was nominated for seven Grammys.

In 2001, Fagen was inducted into the Rock and Roll Hall of Fame as a member of Steely Dan. Following Becker's death in 2017, Fagen continued to tour using the band name until 2024.

== Early life ==
Fagen was born in Passaic, New Jersey, on January 10, 1948 to Jewish parents, descendants of immigrants from Russia, Latvia and Austria who had arrived in the USA in the early years of the 20th century. His father was Joseph "Jerry" Fagen, an accountant, and his mother, Elinor (née Rosenberg), a homemaker who had been a swing singer in upstate New York's Catskill Mountains from childhood through her teens. His family moved to Fair Lawn, New Jersey, a small suburb near Passaic. When he was ten years old, he moved with his parents and younger sister to Kendall Park, a newly constructed suburban section of South Brunswick, New Jersey. The transition upset him, and he detested living in the suburbs. He later recalled that it "was like a prison. I think I lost faith in [my parents'] judgment... It was probably the first time I realized I had my own view of life." His life in Kendall Park, including his teenage love of late-night radio, would inspire his 1982 album The Nightfly.

Fagen became interested in rock and rhythm and blues in the late 1950s. The first record he bought was "Reelin' and Rockin' " by Chuck Berry. At age 11, his cousin, Barbara Cohen, recommended jazz music to him, and he went to the Newport Jazz Festival, becoming what he called a "jazz snob": "I lost interest in rock 'n' roll and started developing an anti-social personality." In the early 1960s, beginning at age 12, he often went to the Village Vanguard jazz club in Greenwich Village, Manhattan, where he was particularly impressed by Earl Hines, Willie "the Lion" Smith, and Bill Evans. He regularly took the bus to Manhattan to see performances by jazz musicians Charles Mingus, Sonny Rollins, Thelonious Monk, and Miles Davis. He learned to play the piano, and he also played baritone horn in the high school marching band. He developed a lifelong fondness for table tennis. In his late teens he was drawn to soul music, funk, Motown, and Sly and the Family Stone. He has also expressed admiration for the Boswell Sisters, Henry Mancini, and Ray Charles.

After graduating from South Brunswick High School in 1965, he enrolled at Bard College in Annandale-on-Hudson, New York, to study English literature, where he met Walter Becker in a coffee house in 1967. Becker and Fagen attracted a revolving assortment of musicians, including future actor Chevy Chase, to form the bands Leather Canary, the Don Fagen Jazz Trio, and the Bad Rock Band. Fagen described his college bands as sounding like "the Kingsmen performing Frank Zappa material". None of the groups lasted long, but the partnership between Fagen and Becker did.

The duo's early career included working with Jay and the Americans, for which they used pseudonyms. In the early 1970s they worked as pop songwriters for ABC/Dunhill Records, which released all of Steely Dan's 1970s albums.

== Career ==
=== Steely Dan ===
Becker and Fagen began to form Steely Dan in the summer of 1970, responding to a Village Voice ad for "a bassist and keyboard player with jazz chops" placed by guitarist Denny Dias. Dias was immediately impressed by the pair's abilities, and especially that they had already written a large quantity of original material. Fans of Beat Generation literature, Fagen and Becker named the band after a steam-powered vibrator mentioned in the William S. Burroughs novel Naked Lunch. The group's first lineup was assembled in December 1971 in Los Angeles, where Becker and Fagen had relocated to work as staff songwriters for ABC/Dunhill. Becker and Fagen formed the core of the band and wrote all the songs, with Becker on bass, and later lead guitar, and Fagen on keyboards and vocals.

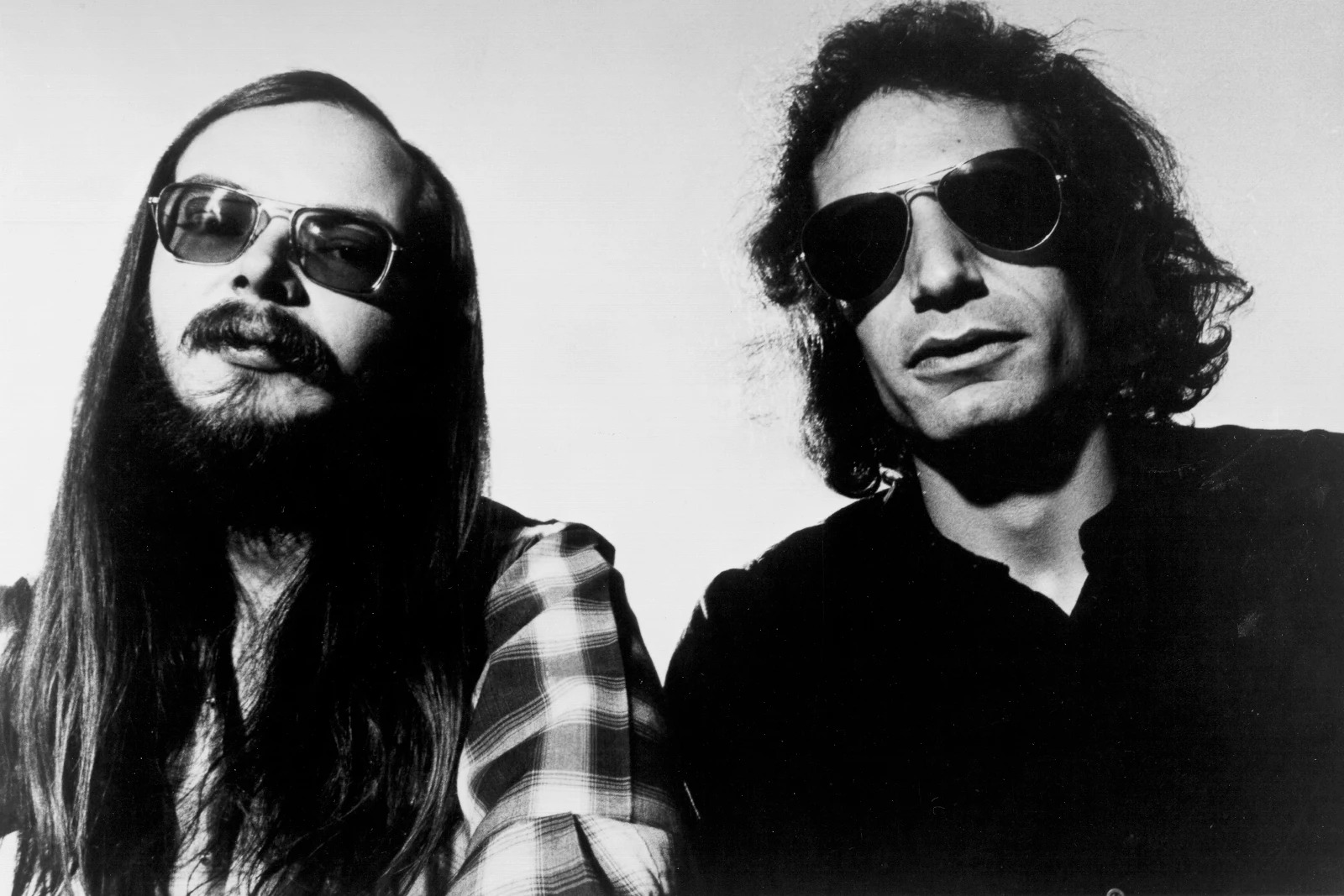
Fagen (right) with Becker in 1977

After the release of their third LP in 1974, the other members left or were fired from the band, which evolved into a studio project headed by Becker and Fagen and employing a wide range of session musicians. Steely Dan's best-selling album was 1977's Aja, which was certified platinum. Three years later, they released Gaucho. Their next album was not until 1995, when they released the live album Alive in America. It was followed by the multiple Grammy Award winning Two Against Nature in 2000, and Steely Dan's most recent album Everything Must Go in 2003. A concert DVD, Two Against Nature, included material from much of the band's history.

After Becker's death in 2017, Fagen wished to retire the Steely Dan name out of respect for his bandmate and tour under a different name, but promoters advised him against it for commercial reasons.

=== Solo career ===
After Steely Dan's breakup in 1981, Fagen released his debut solo album, The Nightfly, in October 1982. It was certified platinum for sales of over a million copies in the U.S. and reached 11 on the Billboard Top 200 albums list. The first single, "I.G.Y.", released in September 1982, peaked at number 26 on the Hot 100. The follow-up single, "New Frontier" (January 1983), peaked at number 70 and was accompanied by a music video. The Nightfly was nominated for the Grammy Award for Album of the Year. In 2002, Rhino Records released a DVD-Audio version of The Nightfly in honor of the album's 20th anniversary. The bonus track, "True Companion", from the Nightfly Trilogy MVI Boxed Set is track seven on the Heavy Metal film soundtrack from 1981.

During the rest of the 1980s, Fagen contributed to soundtracks and wrote a column for Premiere magazine. In 1988, he released "Century's End" from the score to the Michael J. Fox film, Bright Lights, Big City. At the close of the decade, he returned to the stage with the New York Rock and Soul Revue. Becker and Fagen reunited in 1986 to work on the debut album by model and singer Rosie Vela. Becker produced Fagen's second album, Kamakiriad (1993), which was nominated for the Grammy Award for Album of the Year and reached number 10 on the Top 200 albums chart. Fagen co-produced and played keyboards on Walter Becker's solo album debut 11 Tracks of Whack (1994).

Fagen's third solo album, Morph the Cat, was released on March 14, 2006, and featured Wayne Krantz (guitar), Jon Herington (guitar), Keith Carlock (drums), Freddie Washington (bass), Ted Baker (piano), and Walt Weiskopf (sax). It reached 26 on Billboard Top 200 albums list. Morph the Cat was named Album of the Year by Mix magazine. The 5.1 surround sound mix won the Grammy Award for Best Surround Sound Album.

In 2007, Fagen's first three albums were released in a box set, Nightfly Trilogy, in the MVI (Music Video Interactive) format. Each album features DTS 5.1, Dolby 5.1 and PCM Stereo mix but no MLP encoded track, along with bonus audio and video content.

Fagen's fourth album, Sunken Condos, was released in 2012. It reached 12 on the Billboard Top 200 albums list. In 2012 he also toured with the Dukes of September, featuring Michael McDonald and Boz Scaggs. One of the concerts was recorded at Lincoln Center in New York City and broadcast on PBS Great Performances in 2014.

In 2013, Fagen published an autobiography titled Eminent Hipsters. A biography Nightfly: The Life of Steely Dan's Donald Fagen by Peter Jones was published in 2022.

Fagen frequently uses aliases. He wrote the liner notes to Can't Buy a Thrill under the name Tristan Fabriani, which he used on stage when he played keyboards for Jay and the Americans (Becker used Gus Mahler). On his solo albums, when he played or programmed a synthesizer part to replicate a real instrument (bass, vibraphone, horns) he credited one of his aliases: Illinois Elohainu, Phonus Quaver, or Harlan Post.

== Style and themes ==
Fagen has classified himself as both a self-taught pianist and a self-taught vocalist, although he did spend a few semesters studying formally at Berklee College of Music and took some vocal lessons in the mid-1970s as a precaution after feeling the straining effects of years of touring. Although he learned to become an entertainer, early on Fagen suffered from severe stage fright, which prompted Steely Dan producer Gary Katz to hire David Palmer to sing two songs on Steely Dan's debut album, Can't Buy a Thrill. This also led to the hiring of Royce Jones and Michael McDonald as singers in the band's tours in the early 1970s. Fagen plays the Fender Rhodes and Wurlitzer electric pianos.

As a composer, Fagen has never worked in any definable genre. Instead, he has drawn on elements of rock, R&B, blues, soul, jazz, pop, country, funk, film music, musical theatre, the Great American Songbook, and such classical composers as Bach and Stravinsky. One distinctive feature of both Steely Dan's and Fagen's music is the distinctive sound of a chord nicknamed the mü major, in which a major second is inserted into a triad.

According to Robert Christgau, in terms of lyrics, Fagen is a "pathological ironist" who "doesn't much care about hippies" or the message of his generation's counterculture: "His '60s are the Kennedy years, when a smart, somewhat shallow suburban white kid could dream of Brubeck and bohemia and bomb-shelter wingdings and transoceanic rail links to exotic locales." The songs of Bertolt Brecht and Kurt Weill were an important influence on Fagen's irony.

== Personal life ==
Fagen's cousin Alan Rosenberg is an actor who was president of the Screen Actors Guild, while his cousin Mark Rosenberg was an activist in Students for a Democratic Society and a film producer.

In 1993 Fagen married songwriter Libby Titus. Although the two attended Bard College at around the same time, they did not become friends until 1987, when they were backstage at a Dr. John concert. On January 4, 2016, Titus sustained injuries after Fagen allegedly shoved her against a marble window frame at their Upper East Side apartment. Police dismissed the case, and the couple issued the following statement to the New York Post: “Despite misleading reports in the press, we’re happily married. Now in our 23rd year of marriage, we’re looking forward to many, many more.”

Titus co-wrote the song "Florida Room" on Fagen's 1993 album Kamakiriad. Fagen has also performed with his stepdaughter Amy Helm, the daughter of Titus and musician Levon Helm. Fagen has no children of his own. Titus died on October 13, 2024. Upon Titus's death, Fagen posted the following statement on Steely Dan's website: "My beautiful wife, Libby Titus Fagen, passed on October 13th surrounded by family. Thanks for keeping us in your thoughts, and for respecting our privacy at this time."

== Awards ==
- 1985: Honorary Doctor of Arts, Bard College
- 2001: Honorary Doctor of Music, Berklee College of Music
- 2001: Steely Dan inducted into the Rock and Roll Hall of Fame
- 2010: Jazz Wall of Fame, American Society of Composers, Authors and Publishers

== Discography ==
=== Studio albums ===
Year	Album details	Peak chart positions										Certifications (sales thresholds)
Year	Album details	US	AUS	DEN	GER	NLD	NZ	NOR	SWE	SWI	UK	Certifications (sales thresholds)
1982	The Nightfly: Released: October 1, 1982; Label: Warner Bros.	11	19	—	56	16	9	6	8	—	44	RIAA: Platinum; BPI: Platinum
1993	Kamakiriad: Released: May 25, 1993; Label: Reprise	10	80	—	24	13	30	10	9	—	3	RIAA: Gold; BPI: Gold
2006	Morph the Cat: Released: March 7, 2006; Label: Reprise	26	—	29	53	23	—	8	9	27	35	
2012	Sunken Condos: Released: October 16, 2012; Label: Reprise	12	—	36	29	13	—	5	10	53	23	
"—" denotes releases that did not chart

=== Live albums ===
Year	Album details	Peak chart positions									Certifications (sales thresholds)
Year	Album details	US	AUS	DEN	GER	NLD	NZ	SWE	SWI	UK	Certifications (sales thresholds)
2021	Donald Fagen's The Nightfly Live: Released: September 24, 2021; Label: UMe	—	—	—	53	55	—	—	49	—	

with The New York Rock and Soul Revue

Year	Album details	Peak chart positions							Certifications (sales thresholds)
Year	Album details	US	AUS	DEN	NLD	NZ	SWE	UK	Certifications (sales thresholds)
1991	Live at the Beacon: Released: October 29, 1991; Label: Giant Records	—	—	—	—	—	—	—	

=== Soundtrack albums ===
Year	Album details
1971	You've Got to Walk It Like You Talk It or You'll Lose That Beat (with Walter Becker): Released: 1971; Label: Spark Records

=== Podcasts ===
Year	Album details
2013	The Tom & Don Tapes, Vol. 1 (with Tom Schiller): Released: April 1, 2013

=== Box sets ===
Year	Album details
2007	Nightfly Trilogy: Released: November 20, 2007; Label: Reprise
2017	Cheap Xmas: Donald Fagen Complete: Released: October 20, 2017; Label: Reprise

=== Singles ===
Year	Single	Chart positions			Album
Year	Single	US	NLD	UK	Album
1982	"I.G.Y. (What a Beautiful World)"	26	46	—	The Nightfly
1983	"New Frontier"	70	47	—	The Nightfly
1983	"Ruby Baby"	—	—	—	The Nightfly
1988	"Century's End"	83	—	—	Bright Lights, Big City: Original Motion Picture Soundtrack
1993	"Tomorrow's Girls"	—	—	46	Kamakiriad
1993	"Trans-Island Skyway"	—	—	—	Kamakiriad
1993	"Snowbound"	—	—	—	Kamakiriad
"—" denotes the single failed to chart

=== As featured artist ===
Year	Song	Album
1981	"True Companion"	Heavy Metal: Music from the Motion Picture
1984	"Reflections" (with Steve Khan)	That's the Way I Feel Now: A Tribute to Thelonious Monk
2017	"Tin Foil Hat" (Todd Rundgren feat. Donald Fagen)	White Knight

=== Video albums ===
With the Dukes of September

Year	Album details	Peak chart positions
Year	Album details	NLD
2014	The Dukes of September Live: Released: 2014; Label: 429 Records	4

=== Collaborations ===
The sources for this section include AllMusic and Discogs.

- 1969: Terence Boylan, Alias Boona (Verve Forecast) – piano, organ (credited as Don Fagen)
- 1970–1971: Jay and the Americans, touring band – keyboards
- 1970: Jay and the Americans, Capture the Moment (United Artists), "Capture the Moment", "Tricia (Tell Your Daddy)", "She’ll Be Young Forever" and "Thoughts That I’ve Taken To Bed" – co-arranger (with Walter Becker) strings and horns
- 1970: Linda Hoover, I Mean To Shine (Omnivore Recordings), "I Mean To Shine", "Turn My Friend Away", "The Roaring of The Lamb", "Jones" - co-writer (with Walter Becker), "Roll Back The Meaning" - co-writer (with Walter Becker and Dorothy White), keyboards
- 1971: Barbra Streisand, Barbra Joan Streisand (Columbia), "I Mean to Shine" – Hammond organ, co-writer (with Walter Becker)
- 1972: Navasota, Rootin' (ABC Records) – piano, electric piano, co-arranger strings and horns (with Walter Becker); "Canyon Ladies" – co-writer (with Walter Becker)
- 1973: Tim Moore, Tim Moore (Mooncrest), "A Fool Like You" – backing vocals
- 1973: Thomas Jefferson Kaye,Thomas Jefferson Kaye (Dunhill Records), "The Door Is Still Open", "Learning How To Fly" and "I’ll Be Leaving Her Tomorrow" – backing vocals
- 1974: Thomas Jefferson Kaye (ABC Records), First Grade, "Northern California" – piano
- 1977: Terence Boylan, Terence Boylan (Asylum Records), "Don't Hang Up Those Dancing Shoes" and "Shame" – piano
- 1977: Poco, Indian Summer (ABC Records), "Indian Summer" and "Win or Lose" – synthesizer
- 1978: Marc Jordan, Mannequin (Warner Bros.) – piano
- 1978: Pete Christlieb and Warne Marsh, Apogee (Warner Bros.) – co-producer (with Walter Becker)
- 1979: Steve Khan, Arrows (Columbia) – liner notes
- 1980: Far Cry, The More Things Change... (Columbia), "The Hits Just Keep On Comin'", "It's Not As Simple As That" and "Some Things Will Never Change" – background vocals
- 1981: Rickie Lee Jones, Pirates (Warner Bros.), "Pirates (So Long Lonely Avenue)" – synthesizer
- 1982: Eye to Eye, Eye to Eye (Warner Bros.), "On The Mend" – synthesizer solo
- 1982: The King of Comedy (Warner Bros.), film soundtrack, "The Finer Things" – writer, backing vocals, co-producer (with Gary Katz)
- 1983: Diana Ross, Ross (Motown), "Love Will Make It Right" – writer, synthesizer
- 1983: Eye to Eye, Shakespeare Stole My Baby (Warner Bros.), "Jabberwokky" – keyboards
- 1984: Greg Phillinganes, Pulse (Planet), "Lazy Nina" – writer, arranger
- 1984: Various artists, The Gospel At Colonus Original Cast – The Gospel At Colonus (Asylum Records) – co-producer
- 1985: Jane Aaron, Traveling Light, film soundtrack – writer and performer
- 1986: Rosie Vela, Zazu (A&M Records) – synthesizer
- 1986: Yellowjackets, Shades (GRP Records), "Shades" – writer
- 1987: Jane Aaron, Set In Motion, film soundtrack – writer and performer
- 1988: Phil Woods' Little Big Band, Evolution (Concord) – liner notes
- 1988: The Hoops McCann Band, Plays The Music Of Steely Dan (MCA Records), "Rapunzel" (plus seven Steely Dan songs) – co-writer (with Walter Becker), mixing
- 1988: Bright Lights, Big City (Warner Bros.), "Bright Lights, Big City" (Jimmy Reed, writer) – vocals, keyboards, programming, arranger, co-producer (with Gary Katz)
- 1988: Love And Money, Strange Kind Of Love (Mercury Records), "Hallelujah Man" – clavinet (uncredited)
- 1989: Jane Aaron, This Time Around, film soundtrack – writer and performer
- 1990: William S. Burroughs, Dead City Radio (Island Records), "A New Standard by Which to Measure Infamy" – musical accompaniment
- 1991: The Manhattan Transfer, The Offbeat of Avenues (Columbia), "Confide in Me" – writer
- 1992: Glengarry Glen Ross (Music From & Inspired By The Motion Picture) (Elektra), "Blue Lou", performed by The Joe Roccisano Orchestra with Lou Marini (alto sax) – writer
- 1992: Jennifer Warnes, The Hunter (Private Music), "Big Noise, New York" – backing vocals
- 1994: Walter Becker, 11 Tracks of Whack (Giant Records) – producer, arranger, keyboards
- 1995: Mindy Jostyn, Five Miles From Hope (1-800-Prime-CD), "Too Easy" – melodica
- 1995: Raw Stylus, Pushing Against the Flow (Geffen), "37 Hours (in the USA)" – synthesizer
- 1996: Phil Woods, Into the Woods: The Best of Phil Woods (Concord Records) – liner notes
- 1997: Boz Scaggs, My Time: A Boz Scaggs Anthology (Columbia), "Drowning in the Sea of Love" – producer, vocals, piano, electric piano, melodica
- 1998: Ricky Lawson, First Things First (Platinum Entertainment ) – piano
- 2008: Martha Wainwright, I Know You're Married But I've Got Feelings Too (Drowned In Sound Recordings), "So Many Friends" – synthesizer
- 2009: Sam Butler & the Boys / Clarence Fountain, Stepping Up & Stepping Out (Tyscot Records), "It's a Different World Now" – melodica, liner notes
- 2012: Jon Herington, Time On My Hands (Wise Axe Inc.), "Caroline Yes" and "Egirl" – piano and electric piano
- 2015: Peter More, Oh Whitney (EP) – producer
- 2015: Rudimental, We The Generation (Asylum Records), "Common Emotion" – voice
- 2018: Derek Smalls, Smalls Change (Meditations Upon Ageing) (BMG), "Memo To Willie" – vocals
- 2018: Peter More, Beautiful Disrepair (Night Owl Productions) – producer
- 2019: Peter More, Shoulder (EP) (Devil Hills) – producer, piano, organ, vocals
- 2021: David Crosby, For Free (BMG), "Rodriguez For A Night" – co-writer (with David Crosby and James Raymond), keyboards

== Film and TV appearances ==
- 1993: Donald Fagen, Concepts for Jazz/Rock Piano (Homespun Video), instructional video with Warren Bernhardt – piano, electric piano, conversation
- 2009: Memory Man: A Michael Leonhart Film featuring Donald Fagen, promotional video for the Electro-Harmonix Stereo Memory Man effects pedal – The Memory Man
- 2016: The Simpsons, Treehouse of Horror XXVII (Season 28, Episode 4) – voice (himself)
- 2019: Paul Shaffer, Paul Shaffer Plus One (TV) (Series 1, Episode 5) – conversation, electric piano

== Writing ==
- 1987: "Henry Mancini's Anomie Deluxe", Premiere Magazine. Revised and reprinted in Eminent Hipsters.
- 1988: "In The Throes of Lakmania", Premiere Magazine.
- 1988: "Tell Blondie To Break Out The Ice", Premiere Magazine.
- 1989: "A Talk with Ennio Morricone", Premiere Magazine.
- 1989: "All That Jazz", Harper's Bazaar. Revised and reprinted in Eminent Hipsters.
- 2007: "The Devil and Ike Turner. Parsing his hits", Slate.
- 2013: Eminent Hipsters.
- 2016: "The Man Who Told A Christmas Story. What I learned from Jean Shepherd", Slate.
- 2016: "Neutron Sunday. In 1956, Ed Sullivan showed America what nuclear holocaust looks like. We were never the same again", Slate.
- 2016: "Something of Value: How I fell in love with horror movies, and what their terrors taught me", Slate.
- 2020: "Ukulele Ike, a.k.a. Cliff Edwards, Sings Again", Jazz Times.
