= Instead =

Instead may refer to:

- Instead (album), a 2007 album by Onetwo
- "Instead", a 2003 song by Stacie Orrico off her self-titled album
- "Instead" (Madeleine Peyroux song), a 2009 song
- INSTEAD, is an interpreter program for text-based adventure games
- Instead, Suffolk, England
