= 11 Tracks of Whack =

Studio album by Walter Becker
- Released: September 27, 1994
- Recorded: 1993–1994
- Studios: Hyperbolic Sound (Maui, Hawaii): Signet Sound (Los Angeles, California)
- Genre: Jazz rock
- Length: 56:46
- Label: Giant
- Producers: Donald Fagen, Walter Becker

Walter Becker chronology
| 11 Tracks of Whack (1994) | Circus Money (2008) |

11 Tracks of Whack is the first solo album by Steely Dan co-founder Walter Becker, released in 1994. It was his third collaboration since 1980 with Steely Dan partner Donald Fagen, who produced the album, after Becker produced Fagen's Kamakiriad (1993), and Becker and Fagen played on Rosie Vela's debut album Zazu (1986).

== Critical reception ==
Professional ratings
Review scores
| Source | Rating |
|---|---|
| AllMusic | 4.5/5 stars |
| Robert Christgau | (3-star Honorable Mention) |
| Entertainment Weekly | B |
| The Great Rock Discography | 5/10 |
| Q | 4/5 stars |
| (The New) Rolling Stone Album Guide | 3/5 stars |

The New York Times concluded that "11 Tracks of Whack, like Paul Simon's Still Crazy After All These Years, applies singular musical ingenuity to visions of shrinking horizons and squandered opportunities... Steely Dan's snide intelligence has been fused with a sense of mortality."

== Track listing ==
All songs written and composed by Walter Becker except "Cringemaker" which was co-written by Dean Parks. Horn and rhythm arrangements were written by Donald Fagen.

| No. | Title | Length |
|---|---|---|
| 1. | "Down in the Bottom" | 4:16 |
| 2. | "Junkie Girl" | 4:07 |
| 3. | "Surf and/or Die" | 6:15 |
| 4. | "Book of Liars" | 4:09 |
| 5. | "Lucky Henry" | 4:39 |
| 6. | "Hard Up Case" | 4:56 |
| 7. | "Cringemaker" | 5:11 |
| 8. | "Girlfriend" | 5:43 |
| 9. | "My Waterloo" | 4:02 |
| 10. | "This Moody Bastard" | 5:18 |
| 11. | "Hat Too Flat" | 5:26 |
| 12. | "Little Kawai" | 2:44 |

Japan Bonus Track
| No. | Title | Length |
|---|---|---|
| 13. | "Medical Science" | 4:30 |

US Promo CD Single Track
| No. | Title | Length |
|---|---|---|
| 14. | "Fall of '92" | 5:26 |

== Personnel ==
- Walter Becker – vocals, guitar solos, ukulele, bass
- John Beasley – keyboards
- Donald Fagen – keyboards
- Dean Parks – acoustic guitars, electric guitars, first guitar solo (5)
- Adam Rogers – electric guitars (3, 5, 11), second guitar solo (5)
- Fima Ephron – bass (3, 5, 11)
- Ben Perowsky – drums (3, 5, 11)
- Paulinho da Costa – percussion
- Bob Sheppard – saxophones, woodwind solos
- Bruce Paulson – trombone
- John Papenbrook – trumpet
- Catherine Russell – backing vocals
- Brenda White-King – backing vocals

Production

- Walter Becker – producer
- Donald Fagen – producer
- Roger Nichols – engineer, mixing
- David Russell – engineer, mixing
- Tom Hardisty – second engineer
- Earl Martin – second engineer
- John Neff – third engineer
- Craig Siegel – MIDI engineer, technical support
- Glenn Meadows – mastering at Masterfonics (Nashville, Tennessee)
- Linda Starr – project coordinator
- Mick Haggerty – art direction, type design, punch photography
- Kathleen Philpott – type design
- Annalisa – photography
