= Don't Wait Too Long =

Single by Madeleine Peyroux

from the album Careless Love
- Released: September 14, 2004
- Recorded: 2004
- Genre: Jazz
- Length: 3:08
- Label: Rounder
- Songwriters: Madeleine Peyroux, Larry Klein, Jesse Harris
- Producer: Larry Klein

Madeleine Peyroux singles chronology
"Don't Wait Too Long" (2004)	"Dance Me to the End of Love" (2005)

"Don't Wait Too Long" is the only original track from Madeleine Peyroux's second solo album Careless Love and it was written by Peyroux herself, Jesse Harris and Larry Klein. The song was released as a single, so Rounder Records made an EP, which also contained an acoustic version of "Don't Cry Baby" (a Bessie Smith cover). In 2006, at a concert in Moore, Peyroux was quoted saying that her "whole life is in this song".

== Promotion ==
A video clip was also filmed. It was set on a busy street where all kinds of different people were passing by while Peyroux glanced at them. It also showed the singer playing with her guitar, possibly reminiscing her past in the streets of Europe.

== In popular culture ==
In 2005, the song was featured in a Dockers commercial, a 30-second spot titled, "Hello Trolley."

The song plays over the end credits of the 2005 film Monster-In-Law, after Stevie Wonder's rendition of "For Once in My Life".

The song also featured in the 2009 movie The Answer Man with Jeff Daniels and Lauren Graham.

The song is feature in the movie Last Holiday with Queen Latifah.

== Charts ==
Chart (2005)	Peak position
U.S. Adult Alternative Airplay	5
