= Joe Flood =

Joe Flood may refer to:

- John Joe Flood (1899–1982), footballer
- Joe Flood (musician) (born 1960), musician and songwriter
