= Dance Me to the End of Love =

1984 song by Leonard Cohen

- Canadian vinyl single

Single by Leonard Cohen

from the album Various Positions
- Released: December 1984
- Recorded: June 1983
- Genre: Pop, jazz
- Length: 4:38
- Label: Columbia
- Songwriter: Leonard Cohen
- Producer: John Lissauer

Official video
- "Dance Me to the End of Love" on YouTube

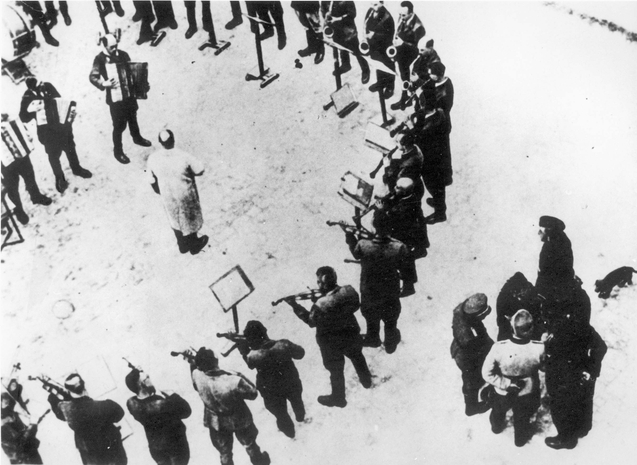
Inmates orchestra of the Nazi Janowska concentration camp playing during the execution of inmates

"Dance Me to the End of Love" is a 1984 song by Canadian singer Leonard Cohen. It was first performed by Cohen on his 1984 album Various Positions. It has been recorded by various artists and in 2009 was described as "trembling on the brink of becoming a standard."

== Leonard Cohen original version ==
"Dance Me to the End of Love" is a 1984 song by Leonard Cohen and first recorded by him for his 1984 album Various Positions. The instrumentals are evocative of traditional klezmer music. When asked about his music sounding "more Jewish" in a 1985 interview, Cohen responded

'My songs are always Jewish, they can’t be anything else but Jewish.'

When pressed more about that framing, Cohen added,

'What is ‘more Jewish?’ It’s like saying somebody is a little bit pregnant or a little bit dead. I write out of my own tradition. My heart was circumcised in the Jewish tradition.'

It has since been recorded by various artists, and has been described as "trembling on the brink of becoming a standard".

Although structured as a love song, "Dance Me to the End Of Love" was in fact inspired by the Holocaust. In a 1995 radio interview, Cohen said of the song:

'it's curious how songs begin because the origin of the song, every song, has a kind of grain or seed that somebody hands you or the world hands you and that's why the process is so mysterious about writing a song. But that came from just hearing or reading or knowing that in the death camps, beside the crematoria, in certain of the death camps, a string quartet was pressed into performance while this horror was going on, those were the people whose fate was this horror also. And they would be playing classical music while their fellow prisoners were being killed and burnt. So, that music, "Dance me to your beauty with a burning violin," meaning the beauty thereof being the consummation of life, the end of this existence and of the passionate element in that consummation. But, it is the same language that we use for surrender to the beloved, so that the song — it’s not important that anybody knows the genesis of it, because if the language comes from that passionate resource, it will be able to embrace all passionate activity.

In 1996, Welcome Books published the book Dance Me to the End of Love, as part of its "Art & Poetry" series, featuring the lyrics of the song alongside paintings by Henri Matisse.

=== Charts ===
| Chart (2016) | Peak position |
|---|---|
| France (SNEP) | 42 |
| Portugal (AFP) | 67 |
| Spain (Promusicae) | 14 |
| Switzerland (Schweizer Hitparade) | 68 |

== Madeleine Peyroux version ==
"Dance Me to the End of Love"

Single by Madeleine Peyroux

from the album Careless Love
- Released: 2005
- Recorded: 2004
- Genre: Jazz
- Length: 3:54
- Label: Rounder
- Songwriter: Leonard Cohen
- Producer: Larry Klein

Madeleine Peyroux singles chronology
| "Don't Wait Too Long" (2004) | "Dance Me to the End of Love" (2005) | "I'm All Right" (2006) |

Official audio
- "Dance Me to the End of Love" on YouTube

Jazz singer Madeleine Peyroux included "Dance Me to the End of Love" on her second solo album, Careless Love (2004). It was released as the second single for the album and has been a part of her concert set-list since then.

Peyroux's rendition was included on the fifth and last of the Queer as Folk soundtracks, as well as on the soundtrack of the 2009 computer game The Saboteur.

Interviewing Peyroux in 2012, The Huffington Post described the song as a "haunting 2004 rendition ... undoubtedly one of modern music's brightest highlights. An inspired, exquisite cover that besides drawing countless comparison's to Billie Holiday's singing, brought the free spirited musician to just artistic prominence."

== Personnel ==
- Madeleine Peyroux – vocals, acoustic guitar
- Dean Parks – guitars
- Larry Goldings – piano, Estey Organ
- David Piltch – double bass
- Jay Bellerose – drums, percussion

== Other versions ==
- Batsheva (Capek) – an English/Yiddish version on her 2012 CD I, Batsheva, Singer
- Sting performed the song at the 2017 Tower of Song: A Memorial Tribute to Leonard Cohen concert
- Bob Dylan performed the song live in Montreal on October 29, 2023 as part of his Rough and Rowdy Ways World Wide Tour. This version was called "breathtaking" by Rolling Stone.

== Painting ==
The Scottish painter Jack Vettriano created a painting with the same title. He has also made two other paintings named after and inspired by Leonard Cohen works: one based on Cohen's novel Beautiful Losers and the other inspired by his song "Bird on the Wire". When asked on Desert Island Discs, Vettriano mentioned Leonard Cohen's album I'm Your Man as one of his must-have records.
