= Joe Flood (musician) =

American singer-songwriter

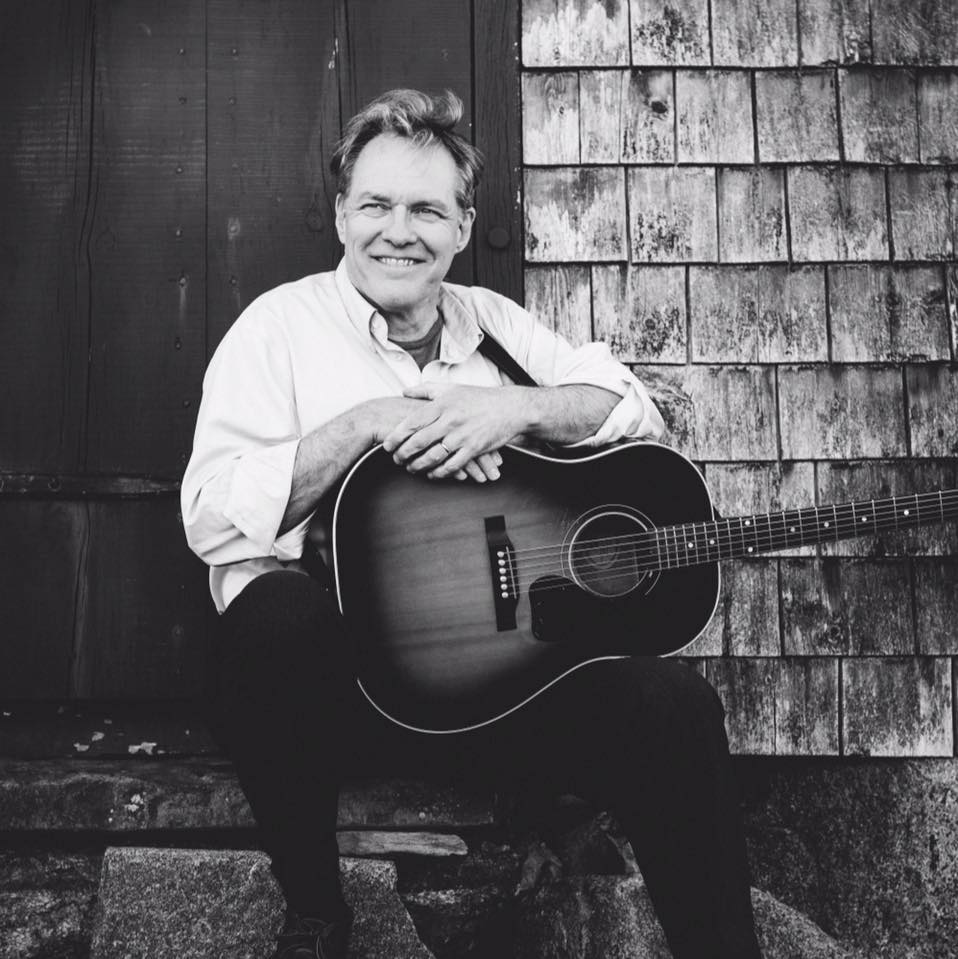

Background information
- Born: 1960 (age 64–65)
- Occupation(s): Musician, Songwriter
- Instrument(s): Guitar, Mandolin, Fiddle, Banjo
- Years active: 1980–present
- Labels: Diesel Only Records
- Website: www.joefloodmusic.com

Joe Flood is a musician and songwriter working in Connecticut and New York, although he started his career as a street musician in Europe. A veteran of the '80s NYC roots rock scene, Allmusic has described im as "a true inheritor of the rich rock-blues-country-folk blend of The Band." The Band has also recorded some of his songs, as have Laura Cantrell, the Flying Neutrinos, and the Bottle Rockets. He's also done sessions work for various artists, including Mojo Nixon, Harry Chapin, Kelly Willis, Artie Traum, and Blues Traveler. He's co-written with Jono Manson, Levon Helm, and Jim Weider, among others.

== Early work ==
Throughout the 1980s, he busked across the United States and Europe, before settling in New York City in 1988. In the early 1990s, he performed and played with his band, Mumbo Gumbo, and was at that time described in the New York Times as having "a raspy voice that perfectly straddles the fence between country and blues." A few years later, he independently released his first solo album, Hotel Albert, in 1997. Crippling Crutch, his second album, featured Will Rigby, was produced by and also featured Eric Ambel, and was released by Diesel Only Records in 2001.

== Recent Work ==
Mumbo Gumbo's singular record was only released in its entirety in 2013. More recently, he self-released an album of translations of Georges Brassens songs in English; produced an album of Danny Fitzgerald and the Lost Wandering Blues and Jazz Band (whose alumni include Joan Osborne and Madeleine Peyroux); won grants from the city of Middletown, Connecticut and the Connecticut Commission on the Arts to put together an album in tribute to 19th century Middletown songwriters; and wrote and recorded a collection of songs for the Nantucket Historical Association

== Discography ==
=== As primary artist ===
- 1990: Mumbo Gumbo
- 1998: Hotel Albert
- 2001: Cripplin' Crutch
- 2010: New Kind of Blue
- 2013: Mumbo Gumbo (remastered)
- 2013: Danny Fitzgerald and the Lost Wandering Blues and Jazz Band
- 2014: Joe Flood Translates and Sings Georges Brassens
- 2015: Songs from the Bend in the River
- 2017: A Troubadour's Tour of Historic Nantucket

== Personal life ==
He currently resides in Connecticut with his wife, artist and illustrator Liz Grace. They have two adult children.
