= Big Brown (poet) =

American street poet

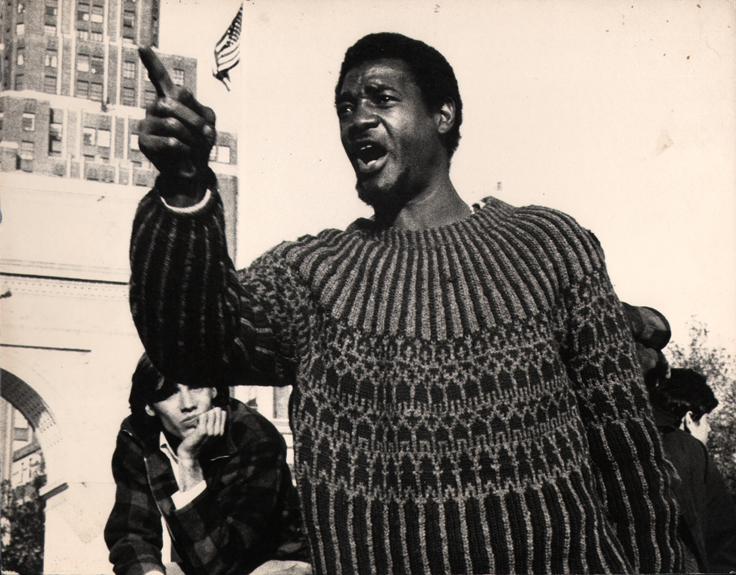
- Big Brown in 1965
- Born: William Clifford Brown; September 30, 1920; Michigan, U.S.
- Died: August 30, 1980 (aged 59); Venice, California, U.S.
- Occupation: Poet

William Clifford Brown (September 30, 1920 – August 30, 1980), who went by the name Big Brown, was a mid-twentieth century American street poet, performer, and recording artist. Prominent among the Beats in New York City from the late 1950s to the late 1960s, his distinctive language and style influenced a number of artists and musicians, including Bob Dylan, who declared Brown's to be the best poetry he had ever heard. Brown also influenced the later genres of hip hop and rap. In 1973, after moving to California, he recorded an album, The First Man of Poetry, Big Brown: Between Heaven and Hell, produced by Rudy Ray Moore. Brown was murdered in Los Angeles seven years later.

In 2015, he was the subject of a three-part series on The New Yorker Radio Hour, "The Search for Big Brown."

== Early life ==
Brown was born in Michigan. According to one report, he was raised in an orphanage in Georgia.

== Boxing career ==
Known for his eloquence and voice and also for his physical size and strength, Brown made a career as a boxer in the 1940s. One obituary asserted that "Brown was at one time a professional heavyweight contender."

== Beat Movement and Greenwich Village ==
In the late 1950s and into the 1960s, Brown performed in Greenwich Village, where he closely associated with other Beat Generation poets, artists, and writers, including Allen Ginsberg, Jack Kerouac, and Larry Rivers. In 1960, a presidential election year, the Beats formed a political party, the "Beat Party," and held a mock nominating convention to announce a presidential candidate: Brown, referred to in newspaper accounts as "Big Brown, of Detroit," won a majority of votes on the first ballot but fell short of the eventual nomination. The Associated Press reported, "Big Brown's lead startled the convention. Big, as the husky negro is called by his friends, wasn't the favorite son of any delegation, but he had one tactic that apparently earned him votes. In a chatterbox convention, only once did he speak at length, and that was to read his poetry."

== Influence on Bob Dylan ==
Bob Dylan has several times remarked on Brown's influence on his music. Dylan, who saw Brown perform in Washington Square Park in the early 1960s, later recalled, "All these black guys would come up from south of the border and recite poetry in the park. Now they'd call them rappers. The best was a guy named Big Brown, who had long poems, each one was about 15 minutes long, and they were long, drawn-out bad man stories, romance, politics, just about everything you can imagine was thrown into his stuff. I always thought this was the best poetry I ever heard."

In another interview, Dylan credited the entire genre of rap to Brown. "Nothing is new," Dylan said. "Even rap records. I love that stuff but it's not new, you used to hear that stuff all the time … there was this one guy, Big Brown, he wore a jail blanket, that's all he ever used to wear, summer and winter. John Hammond would remember him too—he was like Othello, he'd recite epics like some grand Roman orator, really backwater stuff though, Stagger Lee, Cocaine Smitty, Hattiesburg Hattie. Where were the record companies when he was around?"

== Influence on other writers, musicians, and artists ==
Brown fascinated other artists. Larry Rivers, for instance, made an audio-recording of an interview with him. Classical composer David Amram often watched Brown perform in Washington Square Park, where Brown was known to recite the poetry of Edgar Allan Poe, William Shakespeare, and Walt Whitman, and also to elaborate on each of their works. In an interview in 2015, Amram said, "One of the reasons Brown could recite Whitman, among all the other stuff he did, was because he was such a good improviser, so when he was reciting anything …. or making some of the stuff up, that way of riffing or improvising on a classic was all part of the same process."

Scholars of African American folklore and folk music have placed Brown's poetry within the African-American tradition known as toasting. Abiodun Oyewole, of the Last Poets, places Brown's poetry within that tradition as well, but has also suggested that Brown's work crossed a racial divide. Brown frequently performed and later recorded a poem called "Doriella du Fontaine"; The Last Poets recorded a version of the same toast with Jimi Hendrix in 1969. Oyewole, a scholar of poetry as well as a performer, has noted Brown's legacy as a bridge figure between white and black art forms, and especially between Beat poetry and rap music. "It's a hand in the glove if you look at it," Oyewole told The New Yorker Radio Hour. "I mean with Big Brown and Ginsberg, and all the Beat Poets down in the Village, it's alive and well today in more ways than one. I mean these guys represent something that we are trying to capture now. We've got a whole generation of young people who are living, breathing, and dying with the word."

The photographer LeRoy Henderson, who photographed Brown in Washington Square Park in the 1960s, later recalled his poetry as public performance. "This guy Brown, Big Brown, he would be out there reciting his poetry, and he was really quite vocal, and quite—and big guy. Huge guy. And so that picture of him, with him looming in the foreground like that, with that expression on his face, and with his finger pointing in the air, that was...he was good for those gestures!"

In New York, Brown lived for a time with the Blues musician Danny Fitzgerald. Fitzgerald later recorded a story about Brown. "I met Big Brown in Washington Square Park," Fitzgerald said. "What's his name got a lot of his stuff from him: Bob Dylan."

== Woodstock and arrest ==
During the time Brown lived in Greenwich Village, he also spent time in Woodstock, New York, and in nearby Kingston, where he stayed with Fitzgerald. Notable, wherever he lived, for his remarkable attire, which often included a turban and poncho, Brown was arrested in Woodstock in 1964 for walking through the streets of the village on the Fourth of July dressed in an American flag. Police reported that "Brown had his arms protruding through two holes in the flag."He served thirty days in the Ulster County jail. Brown's Woodstock flag protest occurred five years before the 1969 Woodstock Music Festival, which featured similar flag-wearing.

== Los Angeles, The First Man of Poetry, and Rudy Ray Moore ==
Brown moved to Los Angeles sometime between 1969 and 1971. In 1973, he recorded an album with Kent Records, The First Man of Poetry, Big Brown: Between Heaven and Hell, under the label founded by Rudy Ray Moore, a stand-up performer and recording artist. Moore had earlier introduced Brown on his (sexually explicit) 1971 album, The Rudy Ray Moore House Party Album (The Dirty Dozens--Volume 1); Brown is credited on the liner notes and performs on the track called "Dice Game." Folklorists generally place Moore's early, pre-1974 albums within the tradition of toasting. Some of the tracks on The First Man of Poetry, Big Brown, including "Mexicali Rose" and "Honky Tonk Bud," are Brown's distinctive performances of well-known toasts. Others, like "Me" and "Death," appear to have been Brown's own compositions.

The year after Brown recorded The First Man of Poetry, Moore began making a blaxploitation film called Dolemite. The film's plot revolves around the adventures of a character called "Dolemite," a character Moore adopted from a toast of the same name, the very sort of toast that Brown had long been known to perform. In 2019, comedian Eddie Murphy portrayed Moore in a biopic, Dolemite Is My Name. In an early scene in the film, Murphy's Moore persuades a street poet to recite his poetry, which Moore captures on a tape recorder and uses to develop the character of Dolemite.

== Death ==
Brown was killed in 1980, at the age of fifty-nine, in Venice Beach in a hit-and-run. Cecil Davis, a Santa Monica municipal employee, was arrested and arraigned for murder. The police reported that "efforts to locate Brown's family have been unsuccessful."

== Legacy ==
Like many street performers whose influence on later musicians and musical forms has been overlooked, Brown's career has long been obscure. In 2015, Brown's daughter, the artist Adrianna Alty, and the historian Jill Lepore collaborated on a three-part audio story, "The Search for Big Brown," for The New Yorker Radio Hour.

== Discography ==
The First Man of Poetry, Big Brown: Between Heaven and Hell, Kent Records, 1973.
