= Once in a While (Madeleine Peyroux song) =

Single by Madeleine Peyroux

from the album Half the Perfect World
- Released: 2007
- Recorded: 2006
- Genre: Jazz
- Length: 4:00
- Label: Rounder
- Songwriter(s): Madeleine Peyroux, Larry Klein, Joe Harris
- Producer(s): Larry Klein

Madeleine Peyroux singles chronology
"All I Need is a Little Bit" (2007)	"Once in a While" (2007)	"You Can't do Me" (2009)

Once in a While was one of the four original songs Madeleine Peyroux released on her third solo album "Half the Perfect World. It was the third and last single from that album.
The tune, considered one of the highlights of the album, was written by Joe Harris, producer Larry Klein and Peyroux herself. Mark Orton made the arrangements on the album version.
In the song, Peyroux tells to her ex-lover that she still thinks of him "once in a while" and that she "still smiles when she thinks on their kisses" but she is "tired of dying" and so she'll "live instead". The song did not chart and there was no videoclip filmed. Along with this song, on the EP was also released a cover of Leonard Cohen's and Anjani Thomas' "Blue Alert".
