= Danny Fitzgerald =

Danny Fitzgerald may refer to:

- Danny Fitzgerald (musician) (1933–2017), street musician
- Danny Fitzgerald (sportsperson) (1961–2010), Irish hurler and Gaelic footballer
