= I'm All Right =

Single by Madeleine Peyroux

from the album Half the Perfect World
- Released: October 23, 2006
- Recorded: 2006
- Genre: Jazz
- Length: 3:27
- Label: Rounder
- Songwriter(s): Madeleine Peyroux, Larry Klein, Joe Harris
- Producer(s): Larry Klein

Madeleine Peyroux singles chronology
"Dance Me to the End of Love" (2005)	"I'm All Right" (2006)	"All I Need is a Little Bit" (2007)

"I'm All Right" is the opening track of Half the Perfect World, Madeleine Peyroux's third solo album. The song was composed by Walter Becker, Larry Klein and Madeleine Peyroux. It was released as a single and Peyroux sang it in her "Live from Abbey Road" episode. When she was awarded with BBC Best International Jazz Artist in 2007, this was the chosen song for the CD with the winning performers.

== Song information ==
In this song, Peyroux tells to her former lover she is "all right," despite all that has happened. She remembers how he used to make her laugh, how he sang Christmas songs in bed. The lyrics also recall how he made her cry on the day he got drunk and threw a few of her things around. However, throughout the song she accepts that he is gone and eventually lets him know that she has been alone before and that she therefore is, or will be, all right.

According to an interview Peyroux gave in 2006, when a demo of the song was presented to her by Larry Klein, she immediately liked and agreed to record it, as she felt it told a bit of her story.

== Music video ==
It was released a video clip for the tune, where Madeleine Peyroux could be seen walking while playing her guitar and performing with an ensemble of Circus' performers. The video was entirely filmed in black and white.

== Chart performance ==
The song failed to chart on the Billboard Hot 100, but it did peak at #26 on the Adult Alternative Airplay chart.
