= You Can't Do Me =

Single by Madeleine Peyroux

from the album Bare Bones
- Released: January 2009
- Recorded: 2008
- Genre: Jazz-rock, soul-rock
- Length: 5:04
- Label: Rounder
- Songwriter(s): Madeleine Peyroux, Larry Klein, Walter Becker
- Producer(s): Larry Klein

Madeleine Peyroux singles chronology
"Once in a While" (2007)	"You Can't Do Me" (2009)	"Instead" (2009)

"You Can't Do Me" was the first single of Madeleine Peyroux's fourth solo album - Bare Bones - and it hit the radio stations on January 26, 2009. The music was written by Walter Becker and Larry Klein with lyrics by Peyroux. The song was produced by Larry Klein; it begins with an insistent piano chord. No video was produced to accompany the track.
