= Careless Love (album) =

2004 studio album by Madeleine Peyroux

Studio album by Madeleine Peyroux
- Released: September 14, 2004
- Studios: Market Street Recording (Venice, Los Angeles); Paramount Recording (Hollywood)
- Genre: Jazz
- Length: 42:33
- Label: Rounder
- Producer: Larry Klein

Madeleine Peyroux chronology
Got You on My Mind (2004)	Careless Love (2004)	Half the Perfect World (2006)

Professional ratings
Review scores
Source	Rating
AllMusic	4/5 stars
The Guardian	3/5 stars

Careless Love is the third studio album by American singer Madeleine Peyroux, released on September 14, 2004, by Rounder Records. The songs are cover versions except for "Don't Wait Too Long", which Peyroux co-wrote with Jesse Harris and Larry Klein. A deluxe version of the album, released in 2021, included a second CD (or two LPs) featuring previously unreleased live recordings of all but one of the original tracks plus three additional songs, as performed at the Vitoria-Gasteiz jazz festival on July 15, 2005.

== Track listing ==
No.	Title	Writer(s)	Length
1.	"Dance Me to the End of Love"	Leonard Cohen	3:56
2.	"Don't Wait Too Long"	Madeleine Peyroux; Jesse Harris; Larry Klein	3:10
3.	"Don't Cry Baby"	Saul Bernie; James P. Johnson; Stella Unger	3:16
4.	"You're Gonna Make Me Lonesome When You Go"	Bob Dylan	3:26
5.	"Between the Bars"	Elliott Smith	3:42
6.	"No More"	Salvador Camarata; Bob Russell	3:31
7.	"Lonesome Road"	Gene Austin; Nathaniel Shilkret	3:10
8.	"J'ai deux amours"	Vincent Scotto; Géorges Koger; Henri Varna	2:54
9.	"Weary Blues"	Hank Williams	3:39
10.	"I'll Look Around"	George Cory; Douglass Cross	4:47
11.	"Careless Love"	W. C. Handy; Martha Koenig; Spencer Williams	3:50
12.	"This Is Heaven to Me"	Frank Reardon; Ernest Schweikert	3:12
Total length:			42:33

Disc 2 (deluxe edition)
No.	Title	Writer(s)	Length
1.	"Dance Me to the End of Love (Live)"	Leonard Cohen	4:46
2.	"Don’t Cry Baby (Live)"	Saul Bernie; James P. Johnson; Stella Unger	4:28
3.	"Don't Wait Too Long (Live)"	Madeleine Peyroux; Jesse Harris; Larry Klein	5:47
4.	"You’re Gonna Make Me Lonesome When You Go (Live)"	Bob Dylan	4:39
5.	"Between the Bars (Live)"	Elliott Smith	5:33
6.	"J'ai deux amours (Live)"	Vincent Scotto; Géorges Koger; Henri Varna	4:33
7.	"Walking After Midnight (Live)"	Alan Block; Don Hecht	5:04
8.	"No More (Live)"	Salvador Camarata; Bob Russell	4:31
9.	"Lonesome Road (Live)"	Gene Austin; Nathaniel Shilkret	7:29
10.	"I Hear Music (Live)"	Burton Lane; Frank Lesser	3:15
11.	"I’ll Look Around (Live)"	George Cory; Douglass Cross	6:08
12.	"Careless Love (Live)"	W. C. Handy; Martha Koenig; Spencer Williams	6:10
13.	"Destination Moon (Live)"	Marvin Fisher; Roy Alfred	4:53
14.	"This is Heaven to Me (Live)"	Frank Reardon; Ernest Schweikert	5:59

== Personnel ==
=== Musicians ===
- Madeleine Peyroux – vocals, acoustic guitar
- Dean Parks – guitars
- Larry Goldings – piano, Wurlitzer electric piano, Estey Organ, Hammond organ, celeste
- David Piltch – double bass
- Jay Bellerose – drums, percussion
- Lee Thornburg – trumpet (tracks 6 and 12)
- Scott Amendola – brushes (track 10)

=== Technical ===
- Production coordinator – Cindi Peters
- Design – Steven Jurgensmeyer
- Assistant Engineer – Nicolas Fournier, Ricky Chao
- Mixing – Helik Hadar
- Management – American International Artists
- Mastering – Bernie Grundman
- Photography – Andrew MacNaughtan
- Producer – Larry Klein

== Charts ==
=== Weekly charts ===
Weekly chart performance for Careless Love
Chart (2005–2006)	Peak position
Australian Albums (ARIA)	26
Australian Jazz & Blues Albums (ARIA)	3
Belgian Albums (Ultratop Flanders)	54
Belgian Albums (Ultratop Wallonia)	33
Dutch Albums (Album Top 100)	18
French Albums (SNEP)	28
Greek Albums (IFPI)	16
Italian Albums (FIMI)	32
Scottish Albums (Official Charts)	17
Spanish Albums (Promusicae)	91
Swedish Albums (Sverigetopplistan)	29
Swedish Jazz Albums (Sverigetopplistan)	1
UK Albums (Official Charts)	7
UK Jazz & Blues Albums (Official Charts)	1
US Billboard 200	71
US Heatseekers Albums (Billboard)	3
US Top Jazz Albums (Billboard)	2
US Traditional Jazz Albums (Billboard)	2

=== Year-end charts ===
2005 year-end chart performance for Careless Love
Chart (2005)	Position
Australian Jazz & Blues Albums (ARIA)	7
Dutch Albums (Album Top 100)	70
French Albums (SNEP)	121
UK Albums (OCC)	82
US Top Jazz Albums (Billboard)	3

2006 year-end chart performance for Careless Love
Chart (2006)	Position
Australian Jazz & Blues Albums (ARIA)	9
US Top Jazz Albums (Billboard)	12

2007 year-end chart performance for Careless Love
Chart (2007)	Position
Australian Jazz & Blues Albums (ARIA)	9

2008 year-end chart performance for Careless Love
Chart (2008)	Position
Australian Jazz & Blues Albums (ARIA)	17

2009 year-end chart performance for Careless Love
Chart (2009)	Position
Australian Jazz & Blues Albums (ARIA)	29

2010 year-end chart performance for Careless Love
Chart (2010)	Position
Australian Jazz & Blues Albums (ARIA)	45

== Certifications ==
Certifications for Careless Love
Region	Certification	Certified units/sales
Australia (ARIA)	Gold	35,000^{^}
France (SNEP)	Gold	100,000^{*}
Germany (BVMI)	Gold	10,000^{^}
Greece (IFPI Greece)	Gold	10,000^{^}
United Kingdom (BPI)	Platinum	300,000^{^}
United States (RIAA)	Gold	500,000^{^}
^{*} Sales figures based on certification alone.^{^} Shipments figures based on certification alone.
