= Got You on My Mind =

Album by William Galison

Studio album by William Galison & Madeleine Peyroux
- Released: August 24, 2004
- Recorded: 1999 & 2003
- Genre: Jazz
- Length: 41:50
- Label: Waking Up Music
- Producer: William Galison

William Galison & Madeleine Peyroux chronology
Dreamland (1996)	Got You on My Mind (2004)	Careless Love (2004)

Professional ratings
Review scores
Source	Rating
All About Jazz	(not rated) link
Allmusic	(not rated) link
Jazz Police	(not rated) link
PopMatters	(not rated) link
Blues on Stage	(not rated) link

Got You on My Mind is a jazz album by William Galison and Madeleine Peyroux, recorded in 1999, and later compiled into an album by Galison alone in 2003. Seven of its eleven tracks are by the two collaborators, the remainder are by Galison alone.

The album is made up of a wide variety of material, ranging from jazz standards like Jerome Kern and Dorothy Fields' "The Way You Look Tonight" to pop songs like John Lennon's "Jealous Guy"; and containing two originals by Galison and one by Galison and Peyroux. The instrumentation is also varied, with Galison himself playing six different instruments. Some of the songs are early demo recordings of songs Peyroux later released on Careless Love.

== Controversy ==
Tha album has a controversy-ridden history. In late 2005 it became known that Peyroux and her record label had been sued for $1 million by her former boyfriend and musical collaborator Galison, who asserted he had produced and co-created Got You on My Mind.

According to Galison, in 2003 Peyroux told him she was negotiating a deal with Rounder Records for the album that became Careless Love. Rounder Records did not want the recording Peyroux was making with him to be in stores when the Rounder album came out. Peyroux's contract prohibited her from selling the seven tracks she made with Galison except at live performances. When Galison tried to market the record with another label, both Rounder Records and Peyroux's lawyers threatened to sue him and his distributor for copyright infringement. After Galison's potential distributors dropped him, Galison sued Peyroux and her lawyers for libel and tortious interference.

Galison also sued Rounder Records, but later dropped their name from the suit. Rounder Records commented that Galison may be using the legal dispute as an "ill-advised attempt ... to trade on the name and reputation of Ms Peyroux to boost his career by passing off an inferior version of a Madeleine Peyroux album." They also asserted that they had obtained "directly and from Ms Peyroux, evidence of numerous incidents of physically and verbally abusive behaviour by Mr Galison against Ms Peyroux"; Galison denied the abuse allegations and characterized them as libellous.

== Track listing ==
All songs written by William Galison, unless otherwise noted

1. "Back in Your Own Back Yard" (Billy Rose, Al Jolson, Dave Dreyer) - 2:34
2. "J'ai deux amours" (Vincent Scotto, Géo Koger, Henri Vanna) - 3:17
3. "Flambée montalbanaise" (Gus Viseur) - 3:03
4. "Got You on My Mind" (Joe Thomas, Howard Biggs) - 4:18
5. "Jealous Guy" (John Lennon) - 3:41
6. "The Way You Look Tonight" (Dorothy Fields, Jerome Kern) - 3:04
7. "Rag for Madi" - 3:19
8. "Playin'" (Galison, Peyroux) - 4:42
9. "Shoulda Known" - 5:09
10. "Heaven to Me" (Ernest Schweikart, Frank Reardon) - 4:05
11. "Heaven Help Us All" (Ron Miller) - 4:32

Recorded at Excello, Brooklyn, New York in March 2003 by Hugh Pool, and mixed by Ted Spencer at Ted Spencer Studio, New York, in January and February 2004, except track 3, recorded and mixed at Tonstudio Schlag in 1999 by Wolfgang Lohmeier.

== Personnel ==
- Madeleine Peyroux — vocals, rhythm guitar (except tracks 3, 5, 7, 9)
- William Galison — Acoustic and electric guitar and dobro (exc. tracks 2, 3, 10), harmonica (exc. 1, 4, 8, 11), vocals (4, 5, 9, 11), bass harmonica, Spoon and percussion (9)
- Conrad Korsch — double bass, bass guitar (exc. tracks 3, 5, 7, 9)
- James Wormworth — drums, percussion (exc. tracks 3, 5, 7, 9)
- Brian Mitchell — Wurlitzer electric piano (tracks 5, 7, 9), organ (5)
- Tony Garnier — double bass (tracks 5, 7, 9)
- Shawn Pelton — drums, percussion (tracks 5, 7, 9)
- Brad Terry — clarinet (track 7)
- Elaine Caswell — backing vocals (track 9)
- Carly Simon — spoken voice (track 9)
- Dan Reyser — tambourine, shaker (tracks 6, 8, 11)
- Jean Baptiste Bocle — Hammond organ (tracks 8, 11)
- Quadro Nuevo (track 3):

- Mulo Franzl — saxophone
- Heinz Jeromin — accordion
- Robert Wolf — guitar
- D.D. Lowka — bass
