= Walter Becker =

American musician and record producer (1950–2017)

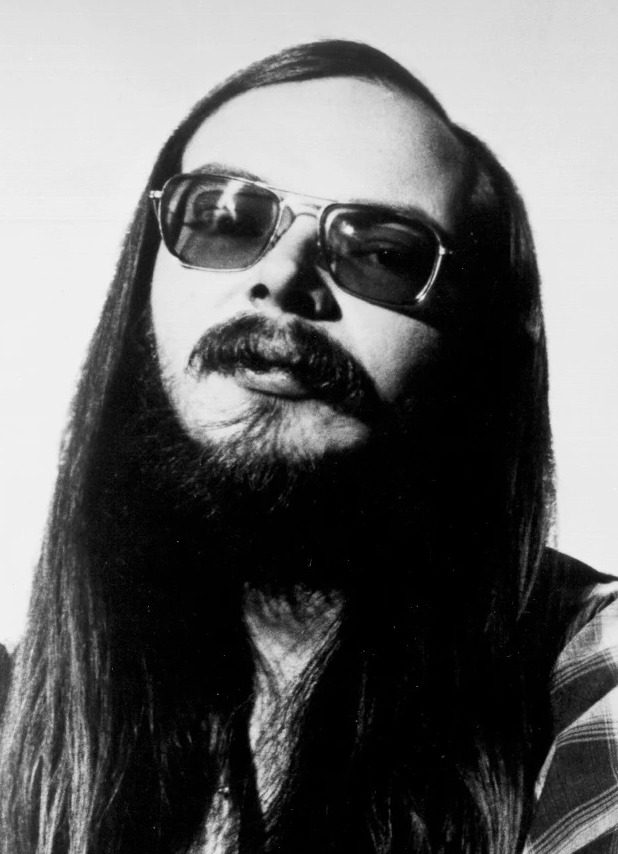
- Becker in 1977

Background information
- Born: Walter Carl Becker; February 20, 1950; Queens, New York, U.S.
- Died: September 3, 2017 (aged 67) New York, New York, U.S.
- Genre: Jazz rock
- Occupations: Musician; songwriter; record producer
- Instruments: Guitar; bass guitar; vocals; keyboards
- Years active: 1969–2017
- Labels: ABC; MCA; Giant; Reprise; Warner Bros.
- Formerly of: Steely Dan; China Crisis
- Website: walterbecker.com

Walter Carl Becker (February 20, 1950 – September 3, 2017) was an American musician, songwriter, and record producer. He was the co-founder, guitarist, bassist, and co-songwriter of the jazz rock band Steely Dan.

Becker met future songwriting partner Donald Fagen while they were students at Bard College. After a brief period of activity in New York City, the two moved to Los Angeles in 1971 and formed the nucleus of Steely Dan, which enjoyed a critically and commercially successful ten-year career. Following the group's dissolution, Becker moved to Hawaii and reduced his musical activity, working primarily as a record producer. In 1985, he briefly became a member of the English band China Crisis, producing and playing synthesizer on their album Flaunt the Imperfection.

Becker and Fagen reformed Steely Dan in 1993 and remained active, recording Two Against Nature (2000), which won four Grammy Awards. Becker released two solo albums, 11 Tracks of Whack (1994) and Circus Money (2008). Following a brief battle with esophageal cancer, he died on September 3, 2017. He and Fagen are the only two members of Steely Dan who appeared on every studio album by the band.

== Early life and career (1950–1971) ==
Becker was born in Queens, New York City and grew up in Forest Hills, Queens. After Becker's parents separated when he was a boy, his British mother returned to England. Becker was made to believe by his father and grandmother that his mother was deceased. However, at some point between his childhood and late adolescence, he discovered that she was living. Becker maintained an unsteady relationship with her from then on. He was raised in Queens and Scarsdale, New York by his father and his grandmother. His father, Carl Becker, sold paper-cutting machinery in Manhattan where Walter graduated from Stuyvesant High School. After starting out on saxophone, he switched to guitar and received instruction in blues technique from neighbor Randy California, who later formed the band Spirit.

Donald Fagen overheard Becker playing guitar at a campus coffee shop, the Red Balloon, when they were both students at Bard College in Annandale-on-Hudson, New York. In a 2007 interview Fagen said, "I hear this guy practicing, and it sounded very professional and contemporary. It sounded like, you know, like a black person, really." They formed the band Leather Canary, which included fellow student Chevy Chase on drums. At the time, Chase called the group "a bad jazz band."

Becker left the school in 1969 before completing his degree and moved with Fagen to Brooklyn, where the two began to build a career as a songwriting duo. They were members of the touring band for Jay and the Americans but used the pseudonyms Gus Mahler (Becker) and Tristan Fabriani (Fagen). They composed music for the soundtrack to You've Got to Walk It Like You Talk It or You'll Lose That Beat, a 1971 film starring Zalman King.

== With Steely Dan (1971–1981) ==
In 1971, Becker and Fagen moved to Los Angeles and were hired by Gary Katz as staff songwriters at ABC Records, later forming Steely Dan with guitarists Denny Dias and Jeff "Skunk" Baxter and drummer Jim Hodder. Fagen played keyboards and sang, while Becker played bass guitar. Steely Dan spent the next three years touring and recording before swearing off touring in 1974, confining themselves to the studio with personnel that changed for every album. In addition to co-writing all of the band's material, Becker played guitar and bass guitar and sang background vocals.

Pretzel Logic (1974) was the first Steely Dan album to feature Becker on guitar. "Once I met [session musician] Chuck Rainey", he explained, "I felt there really was no need for me to be bringing my bass guitar to the studio anymore".

Despite the success of Aja in 1977, Becker suffered from setbacks during this period, including an addiction to narcotics. After the duo returned to New York in 1978, Becker's girlfriend Karen Roberta Stanley, who was an employee of ABC Dunhill Records and personal manager for the band, died of a drug overdose in his apartment on January 30, 1980; this resulted in a wrongful death lawsuit against him. Soon after, Becker was hit by a cab in Manhattan while crossing the street; he was forced to walk with crutches while recovering. His exhaustion was made worse by commercial pressure and the complicated recording of the album Gaucho (1980). Becker and Fagen suspended their partnership in June 1981.

== Work in record production (1981–1993) ==
Following Steely Dan's breakup, Becker and his family moved to Maui. Becker ceased using drugs, stopped smoking and drinking, and became an "avocado rancher and self-styled critic of the contemporary scene."

He produced albums for the new wave bands Fra Lippo Lippi and China Crisis, and is credited on the latter's 1985 album Flaunt the Imperfection as a member of the band. He also produced albums for Michael Franks and John Beasley. Becker produced Rickie Lee Jones's album Flying Cowboys (certified gold by the RIAA in 1997) and played bass on the title track. Becker and Fagen reunited in 1986 to collaborate on Zazu, the debut album by Rosie Vela. In 1991, Becker appeared in Fagen's New York Rock and Soul Revue.

== Steely Dan reformation (1993–2017) ==
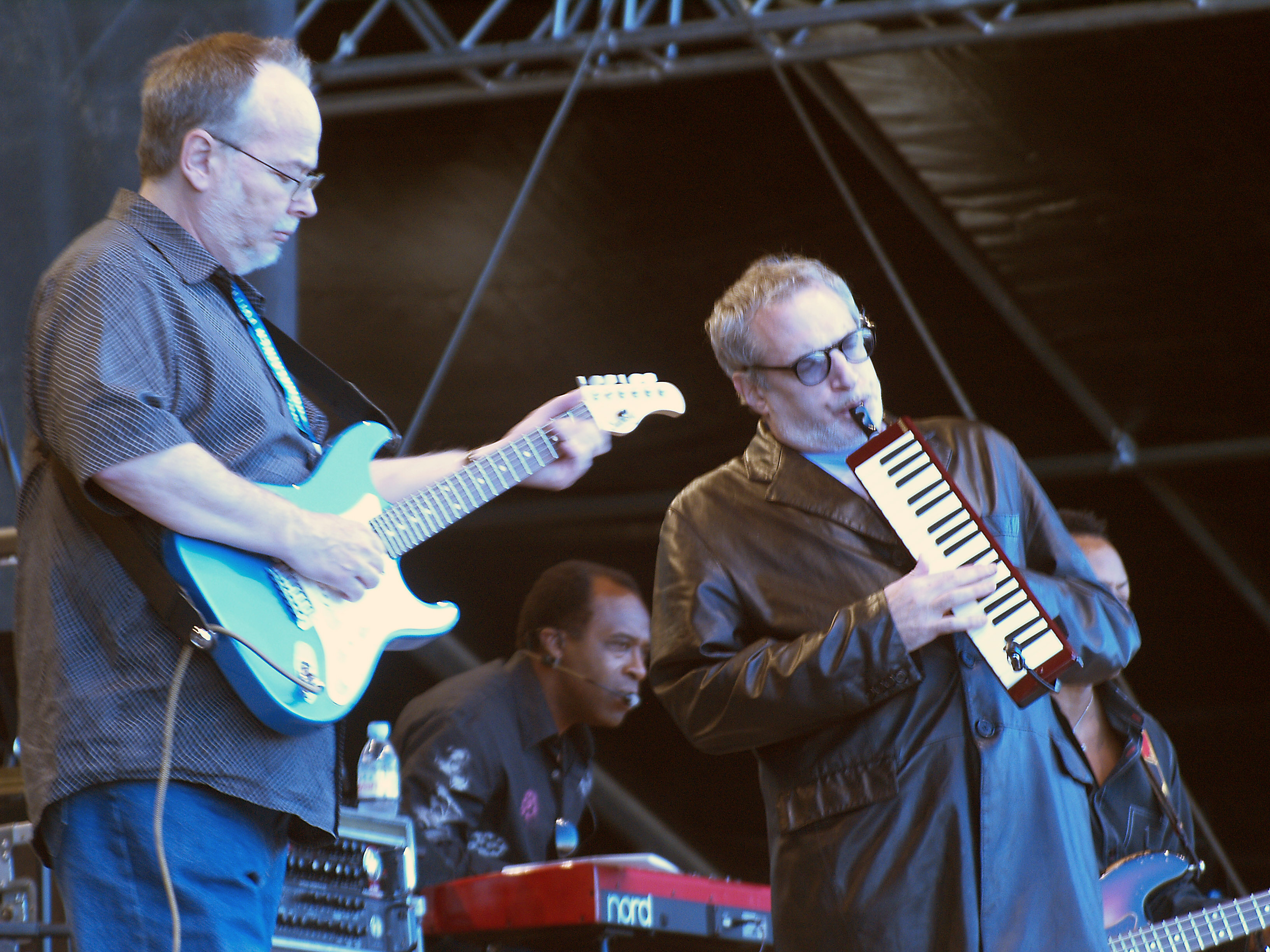
Becker and Donald Fagen at Pori Jazz, 2007

In 1993, Becker produced Fagen's album Kamakiriad. A year later, Fagen co-produced Becker's debut album 11 Tracks of Whack.

Also in 1993, Steely Dan began touring for the first time in nineteen years, resulting in the 1995 release of their first live album, Alive in America, a compilation of live recordings from different American tour dates in 1993 and 1994.

In 2000, they released Two Against Nature, their first album of new material in twenty years. The album won four Grammy Awards, including Album of the Year. In 2001, they were inducted into the Rock and Roll Hall of Fame and received honorary doctorates from the Berklee College of Music, which they accepted in person. In 2003, they released the album Everything Must Go with Becker singing lead vocal on "Slang of Ages". They followed the album with a tour.

In 2005, Becker co-produced and played bass guitar on the album All One by Krishna Das and played guitar on the album Tough on Crime by Rebecca Pidgeon. He co-wrote "I'm All Right" from the album Half the Perfect World (2006) by Madeleine Peyroux, and "You Can't Do Me" and the title track from her album Bare Bones (2009). See the "Collaborations" section below for a full list of Becker's work with other artists.

He was inducted into the Long Island Music Hall of Fame in 2008.

His second solo album, Circus Money, was released on June 10, 2008, fourteen years after its predecessor. The songs were inspired by reggae and other styles of Jamaican music.

== Instruments and equipment ==
Becker was a collector of musical equipment, accumulating hundreds of guitars and amplifiers, as well as numerous other instruments, pedals, pre-wired pedalboards, "speakers, recording gear, and ephemera." In concert, he often played custom-built guitars modeled after Stratocasters.

After his death, his gear was auctioned off by Julien's for US$3.3 million in total. Becker's guitar and amp collection was the largest ever sold by Julien's, whose owner said "what made [the] collection unique" was that Becker "literally played all of them."

In a column for Guitar Player magazine published in 1994, Becker coined the acronym G.A.S. ("Guitar Acquisition Syndrome"), denoting the uncontrolled accumulation of music gear. The term was later adapted as Gear Acquisition Syndrome in online forums and music magazines.

== Personal life ==
In 1975, Becker married Juanna Fatouros. In 1984, he married Elinor Roberta Meadows, a yoga teacher. The couple had a son, Kawai and an adopted daughter Sayan. They divorced in 1997. Becker wrote "Little Kawai" for his son, and it became the final song on 11 Tracks of Whack. Becker was married to Delia Cioffi at the time of his death.

== Illness and death ==
In the spring of 2017, Becker was diagnosed with "an aggressive form of esophageal cancer" during an annual medical checkup. Despite vigorous treatment, the cancer rapidly worsened and Becker was unable to perform at Steely Dan's concerts in the months that followed. He died from the disease on September 3, 2017, at the age of 67 at his home in Manhattan, New York City. At the time of his death, no cause or other details were announced, but a statement released in November by Becker's widow, Delia Becker, detailed his struggle with the disease.

In a statement released to the media the day of Becker's death, Fagen recalled his long-time friend and musical partner as "smart as a whip, an excellent guitarist and a great songwriter", and closed by stating that he intended to "keep the music we created together alive as long as I can with the Steely Dan band."

Julian Lennon, Steve Lukather, John Darnielle of The Mountain Goats and other musicians made public statements mourning Becker's death. Rickie Lee Jones, whose album Flying Cowboys was produced by Becker, recalled her long friendship with him in an editorial she wrote for Rolling Stone.

At a public ceremony on October 28, 2018, 72nd Drive at 112th Street in Forest Hills, Queens, New York City, was co-named Walter Becker Way.

== Discography ==
=== Studio albums ===
- 1994: 11 Tracks of Whack (Giant Records)
- 2008: Circus Money (5 over 12/Mailboat Records; Sonic 360 (UK); Victor (Japan))

=== Soundtrack albums ===
- 1971: You've Got to Walk It Like You Talk It or You'll Lose That Beat (Spark Records) (with Donald Fagen)

=== Collaborations ===
The sources for this section include walterbecker.com, AllMusic and Discogs.

- 1969: Terence Boylan, Alias Boona (Verve Forecast) – guitar, bass
- 1970: Linda Hoover, I Mean To Shine (Omnivore Recordings, released 2022) – bass, arranger, co-writer (with Donald Fagen) of five songs
- 1970–1971: Jay and the Americans, touring band – bass
- 1970: Jay and the Americans, Capture the Moment (United Artists), "Capture the Moment", "Tricia (Tell Your Daddy)", "She’ll Be Young Forever" and "Thoughts That I’ve Taken To Bed" – co-arranger (with Donald Fagen) strings and horns, bass
- 1972: Navasota, Rootin' (ABC Records) – co-arranger strings and horns (with Donald Fagen); "Canyon Ladies" – co-writer (with Donald Fagen)
- 1973: Thomas Jefferson Kaye,Thomas Jefferson Kaye (Dunhill Records), "I’ll Be Leaving Her Tomorrow" and "Hole In The Shoe Blues" – bass
- 1974: Thomas Jefferson Kaye, First Grade (ABC/Dunhill Records), "Jones" and "American Lovers" – bass
- 1978: Pete Christlieb and Warne Marsh, Apogee (Warner Bros.) – co-producer (with Donald Fagen)
- 1985: China Crisis, Flaunt the Imperfection (Virgin) – producer, arranger, synthesiser, percussion
- 1986: Rosie Vela, Zazu (A&M) – lead guitar, guitar, synthesiser
- 1987: Fra Lippo Lippi, Light and Shade (Virgin) – producer, guitar
- 1989: China Crisis, Diary of a Hollow Horse (Virgin) – producer, synthesiser
- 1989: Michael Franks, Blue Pacific (Reprise), "All I need", "Vincent's Ear" and "Crayon Sun (Safe At Home)" – producer
- 1989: Rickie Lee Jones, Flying Cowboys (Geffen) – producer, bass on "Flying Cowboys"
- 1991: Nathalie Archangel, Owl (MCA Records) – bass
- 1991: LeeAnn Ledgerwood, You Wish (Triloka Records) – producer
- 1991: Jeff Beal, Objects In The Mirror (Triloka Records) – producer
- 1991: Bob Sheppard, Tell Tale Signs (Windham Hill Jazz) – producer
- 1991: Andy LaVerne, Pleasure Seekers (Triloka Records) – producer
- 1991: Bob Bangerter, Looking At The Bright Side (Don't Stop Music, Inc.) – mixing, co-producer (with Tom Hall)
- 1991: The New York Rock and Soul Revue, live dates – guitar
- 1992: Spinal Tap, Break Like the Wind (MCA Records) – liner notes
- 1992: Jeremy Steig, Jigsaw (Triloka Records) – producer
- 1992: John Beasley, Cauldron (Windham Hill Jazz) – producer
- 1992: Dave Kikoski, Persistent Dreams (Triloka Records) – producer, liner notes
- 1992: Marty Krystall, unreleased album, "Epistrophy" (on Windham Hill sampler Commotion 2) – producer
- 1993 The Singing Mongooses, The Singing Mongooses (Alahao Records) – executive producer
- 1993: Lost Tribe, Lost Tribe (Windham Hill Jazz) – producer
- 1993: Andy LaVerne, Double Standard (Triloka Records) – producer
- 1993: John Beasley, A Change Of Heart (Windham Hill Jazz) – producer
- 1993: Donald Fagen, Kamakiriad (Reprise) – producer, bass, guitar
- 1994: John Beasley, Mose the Fireman (Rabbit Ears Productions) – producer (music), co-writer (with John Beasley), bass, banjo, mandolin
- 1998: Sally Taylor, Tomboy Bride (Blue Elbow Publishing) – mixing
- 2005: Krishna Das, All One (Triloka Records) – producer, bass
- 2005: Rebecca Pidgeon, Tough on Crime (Fuel 2000), "Tough on Crime" – guitar solo
- 2006: Madeleine Peyroux, Half the Perfect World (Rounder/Universal), "I'm All Right" – co-writer (with Larry Klein and Madeleine Peyroux)
- 2008: Lucy Schwartz, "Beautiful" (single) – co-producer (with Larry Klein)
- 2009: Madeleine Peyroux, Bare Bones (Rounder/Universal), "Bare Bones" and "You Can't Do Me" – co-writer (with Larry Klein and Madeleine Peyroux)
- 2009: Roger Rosenberg, Baritonality (Sunnyside Communications) – producer
