= Instead (Madeleine Peyroux song) =

Single by Madeleine Peyroux

from the album Bare Bones
- Released: 2009
- Recorded: 2008
- Genre: Jazz
- Length: 5:13
- Label: Rounder
- Songwriter(s): Madeleine Peyroux, Julian Coryell
- Producer(s): Larry Klein

Madeleine Peyroux singles chronology
"You Can't do Me" (2009)	"Instead" (2009)

"Instead" is the opening track of Madeleine Peyroux's album Bare Bones. It was a retro-feeling and charted on the Japanese 100 Singles. According to Peyroux, the song is a reminder of how we should enjoy life and the things we have. Reportedly, she wrote it in a "dark point" of her life. To promote the song, it was released as a video of a live performance.
