= Alfred Ablett =

Recipient of the Victoria Cross (1830–1897)

Alfred Ablett VC
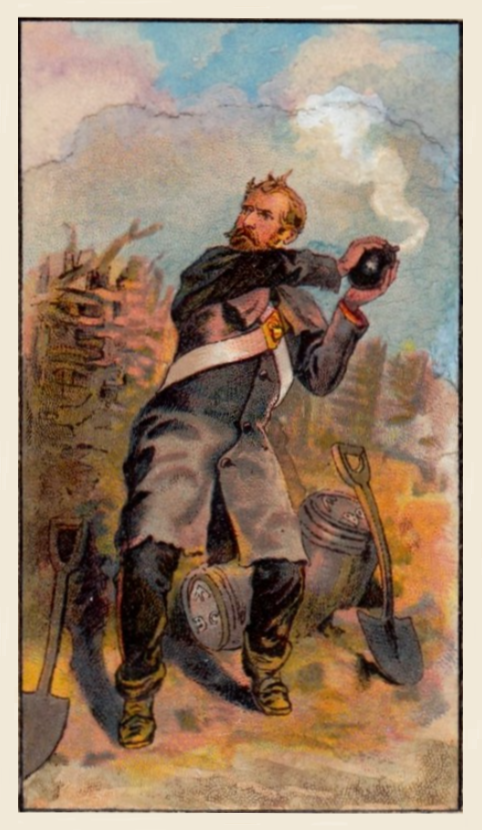
- Ablett winning the VC, depicted on a cigarette card
- Born: 3 August 1830; Weybread, Suffolk
- Died: 12 March 1897 (aged 66); Poplar, London
- Burial place: St Andrew's Churchyard, Weybread
- Military career
- Allegiance: United Kingdom
- Branch: British Army
- Rank: Sergeant
- Service number: 5872
- Units: 3rd Battalion, Grenadier Guards
- Conflicts: Crimean War: Battle of Alma; Battle of Inkerman; Battle of Balaclava; Siege of Sebastopol
- Awards: Victoria Cross; Distinguished Conduct Medal

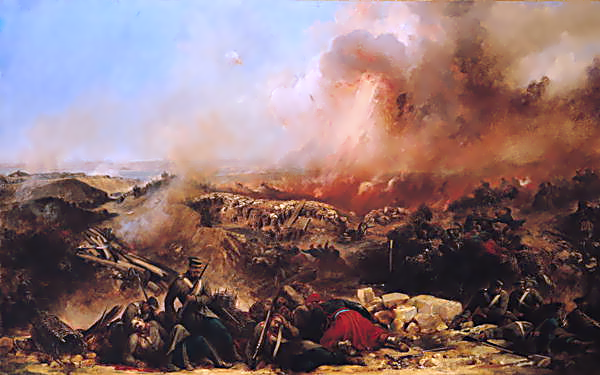
The Siege of Sebastopol

Alfred Ablett ( 3 August 1830 – 12 March 1897) was a British Army soldier and recipient of the Victoria Cross, the highest award for gallantry in the face of the enemy that can be awarded to British and Commonwealth forces. A soldier with the Grenadier Guards during the Crimean War, he was awarded the VC for his actions on 2 September 1855, during the siege of Sebastopol.

== Early life ==
Alfred Ablett was born on 3 August 1830 at Weybread, Suffolk, to Samuel and Elizabeth Ablett. He was baptised just over a month later on 3 September. According to the 1841 census, he had four older brothers, one younger brother and two younger sisters.

== Military service ==
Ablett joined the army on 20 February 1850 at the age of 19 years and five months, and was assigned to the 3rd Battalion, Grenadier Guards. He served in the Crimean War, seeing action at the battles of the Alma, Inkerman and Balaclava. In early September 1855, while still a private, he performed the deed which would earn him a Victoria Cross for bravery while in the trenches at the siege of Sebastopol.

His VC citation in the London Gazette reads:

On 2 September, 1855, seeing a shell fall in the centre of a number of ammunition cases and powder, he instantly seized and threw it outside the trench; it burst as it touched the ground.

He was nominated for the award by his company captain who witnessed the event, and was among 29 men to be presented with the medal in Hyde Park, London, on 26 June 1857 by Queen Victoria. While in the Crimea he also received the Distinguished Conduct Medal and gained the rank of sergeant.

He was one of two members of the 3rd Battalion, Grenadier Guards who earned the Victoria Cross during the Crimean War, the other being Private Anthony Palmer.

== Later life and legacy ==
Ablett was invalided out of Army in October 1862 suffering from rheumatism, the result of frostbite and fever contracted in Crimea. In 1868, he was accused of attempting to kill himself with a rifle, but was found not guilty by a jury at a court in Norwich. From 1871 he served for 26 years in the London Dock Police, leaving as an inspector. He died at his home on East India Road, Poplar, London on 12 March 1897 and was buried in St Andrew's churchyard, Weybread.

His Victoria Cross was sold for £62 in 1903, and is now held by the Grenadier Guards Regimental Headquarters, Wellington Barracks, London. His family is in possession of a replica.
