= Circus Money =

Studio album by Walter Becker
- Released: 10 June 2008
- Studio: Avatar and BC Studio (New York City, New York): Market Street (Santa Monica, California)
- Genre: Jazz rock
- Length: 59:59
- Label: 5 Over 12; Mailboat Sonic360
- Producer: Larry Klein

Walter Becker chronology
11 Tracks of Whack (1994)	Circus Money (2008)

Professional ratings
Review scores
Source	Rating
AllMusic	4/5 stars
The Guardian	3/5 stars
The Independent	3/5 stars
Los Angeles Times	3/4 stars
Mojo	3/5 stars
MusicOMH	2/5 stars
PopMatters	8/10 stars
Record Collector	4/5 stars
Rolling Stone	3/5 stars
Uncut	4/5 stars

Circus Money is the second and final solo album by Walter Becker, released on June 10, 2008, through the 5 Over 12 label (an imprint of Mailboat Records), and on July 14, 2008, through Sonic360, outside North America. Unlike Becker's previous solo release, this album does not have the participation of Becker's fellow Steely Dan founder and bandmate Donald Fagen.

The cover artwork features graphic work inspired by a photograph of a Yup'ik mask, reproduced in Ann Fienup-Riordan's The Living Tradition of Yup'Ik Masks. Becker wrote that after obtaining the rights to re-use the photograph (from Fienup-Riordan as well as the book's publisher and the original photographer), the Smithsonian Institution's National Museum of Natural History (where the mask is held) was notified of the intended use of the photograph. The museum attempted to block the use of the photograph, citing cultural sensitivity and the sacred nature of the mask. Following legal advice, it was deemed the museum had no legal basis for blocking the photograph's use.

== Track listing ==
All songs written by Walter Becker and Larry Klein, except "Circus Money", written solely by Becker.

1. "Door Number Two" - 4:33
2. "Downtown Canon" - 5:36
3. "Bob Is Not Your Uncle Anymore" - 4:45
4. "Upside Looking Down" - 4:08
5. "Paging Audrey" - 6:48
6. "Circus Money" - 4:15
7. "Selfish Gene" - 4:38
8. "Do You Remember the Name" - 4:14
9. "Somebody's Saturday Night" - 4:29
10. "Darkling Down" - 5:04
11. "God's Eye View" - 6:02
12. "Three Picture Deal" - 5:27
13. "Dark Horse Dub"* - 6:46

*International release only

== Personnel ==
Musicians

- Walter Becker – vocals, guitars (1, 2), bass (1–5, 7–12), guitar solo (7, 9, 10)
- Ted Baker – keyboards (1–3, 5, 7, 10–12), acoustic piano (4, 6, 9), electric piano (9)
- Jim Beard – acoustic piano (1, 3, 5, 7, 12), keyboards (5, 6, 8, 11), clavinet (5), calliope (7), RMI Rock-Si-Chord (12)
- Larry Goldings – organ (2), Hammond organ (10)
- Henry Hey – keyboards (4, 8)
- Jon Herington – guitars, slide guitar (8)
- Dean Parks – guitars (2, 4, 9), guitar solo (4)
- Larry Klein – bass (6)
- Keith Carlock – drums, percussion (1)
- Gordon Gottlieb – percussion (2, 3, 7, 10, 12)
- Luciana Souza – vocal solo (7), pandeiro (9)
- Chris Potter – tenor saxophone (1, 5, 6)
- Roger Rosenberg – bass clarinet (11), baritone saxophone (12)
- Carolyn Leonhart-Escoffery – backing vocals (1–5, 8–11)
- Kate Markowitz – backing vocals (1, 2, 4, 6, 7, 9–12)
- Cindy Mizelle – backing vocals (1, 2, 4, 5, 9–12)
- Windy Wagner – backing vocals (1, 2, 4, 6, 9–12)
- Carmen Carter – backing vocals (2, 6, 9)
- Tawatha Agee – backing vocals (5, 12)
- Sharon Bryant – backing vocals (5, 12)
- Sweet Pea Atkinson – backing vocals (11)
- Sir Harry Bowens – backing vocals (11)
- Terry Dexter – backing vocals (11)

Production

- Larry Klein – producer
- Helik Hadar – engineer, mixing
- Jay Messina – engineer
- Elliot Scheiner – engineer
- Jim Beard – additional engineer
- Brian Montgomery – additional engineer
- Justin Gerrish – assistant engineer
- Chris Lupo – assistant engineer
- Bernie Grundman – mastering at Bernie Grundman Mastering (Hollywood, California)
- Roger Sadowsky – guitar and bass technician
- Andrew Rathbun – musical transcription
- Jill Dell'Abate – production coordinator
- Cindi Peters – production coordinator
- A. Denovo – design, photography
- Carol Bobolts – design support
