= Danny Fitzgerald (musician) =

American street musician (1933–2017)

- Born: June 10, 1933; Kingston, New York, U.S.
- Died: February 6, 2017 (age 83)
- Genres: Blues, Jazz
- Occupation: Singer
- Instrument: Washtub Bass
- Website: http://www.lostwandering.com/

Danny Fitzgerald was a street musician, living and performing mostly between New York City and Paris. He led The Lost Wandering Blues and Jazz Band, most famous for its associations with young Madeleine Peyroux, who joined the band as a runaway teenager, and Joan Osborne.

== Early life ==
Danny Fitzgerald was born in Kingston, NY in 1933. He was a member of the US Army and stationed in Germany in the 1950s, which began his alternation between traveling around Europe and traveling around the United States. He was associated with the beatnik scene in Greenwich Village. His writing was included in Abbie Hoffman's Steal This Book. Around the same time Bob Dylan regularly slept on his floor.

== Later life ==
Fitzgerald always maintained a migratory lifestyle. When in New York, he could often be found at Starbucks on Astor Place in New York City.

Earlier in his life, he was friends with a street poet named Big Brown, who Bob Dylan called "the best he ever heard." His memories were recalled for a 2015 WNYC investigation by Jill Lepore into what happened to Big Brown.

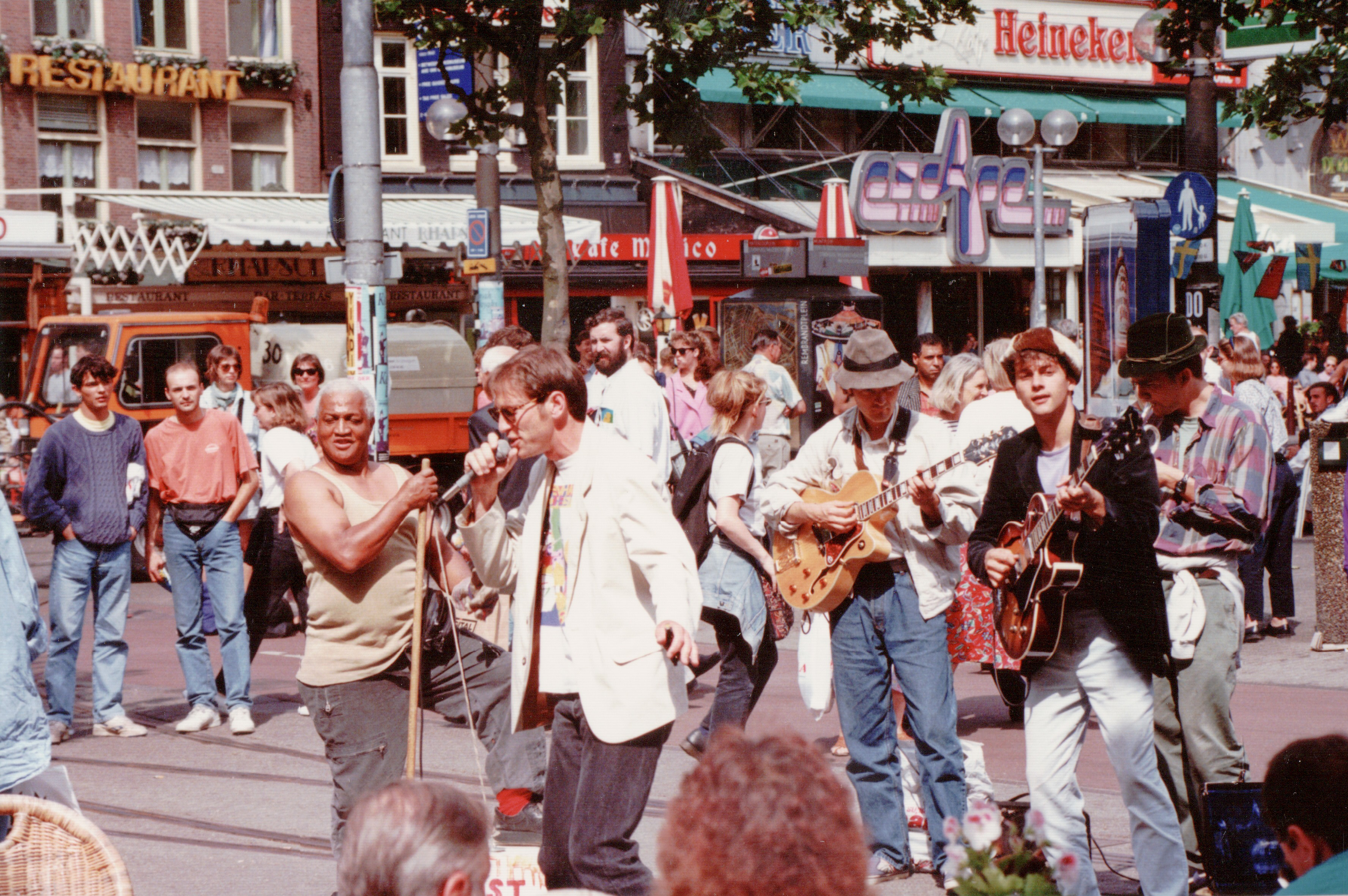
Danny Fitzgerald and The Lost Wandering Blues and Jazz Band in Amsterdam in 1992

He made a lot of music, but recorded little. He had "little patience for the machinations of the music business." His preference was to have "fun and music. Not just music, fun and music." His third and last album was released in December, 2013, with tracks alternating between recorded songs and excerpts of his stories, extracted from interviews he did with long-time collaborator, Joe Flood.

He died on February 6, 2017, in Kingston, NY. He was 83.

== Film appearances ==
He and his band appeared in Henry Jaglom's 1983 film Can She Bake a Cherry Pie? with Karen Black and a young Larry David. He was the subject of two documentaries, Jazbo Gross' Busker, (2010) which was nominated for a Danish DOX award, and Working for the Good Life, for French Television. In the latter, he said the only people who could really live the lives they wanted were millionaires and buskers.

== Discography ==
=== With Lost Wandering ===
- Having ourselves a Time
- Spreading Rhythm Around
- The Best Of
- In Holland
- Danny Fitzgerald and the Lost Wandering Blues and Jazz Band, 2013
