= Weybread =

Village in Suffolk, England

Coordinates: 52.374°N 1.296°E

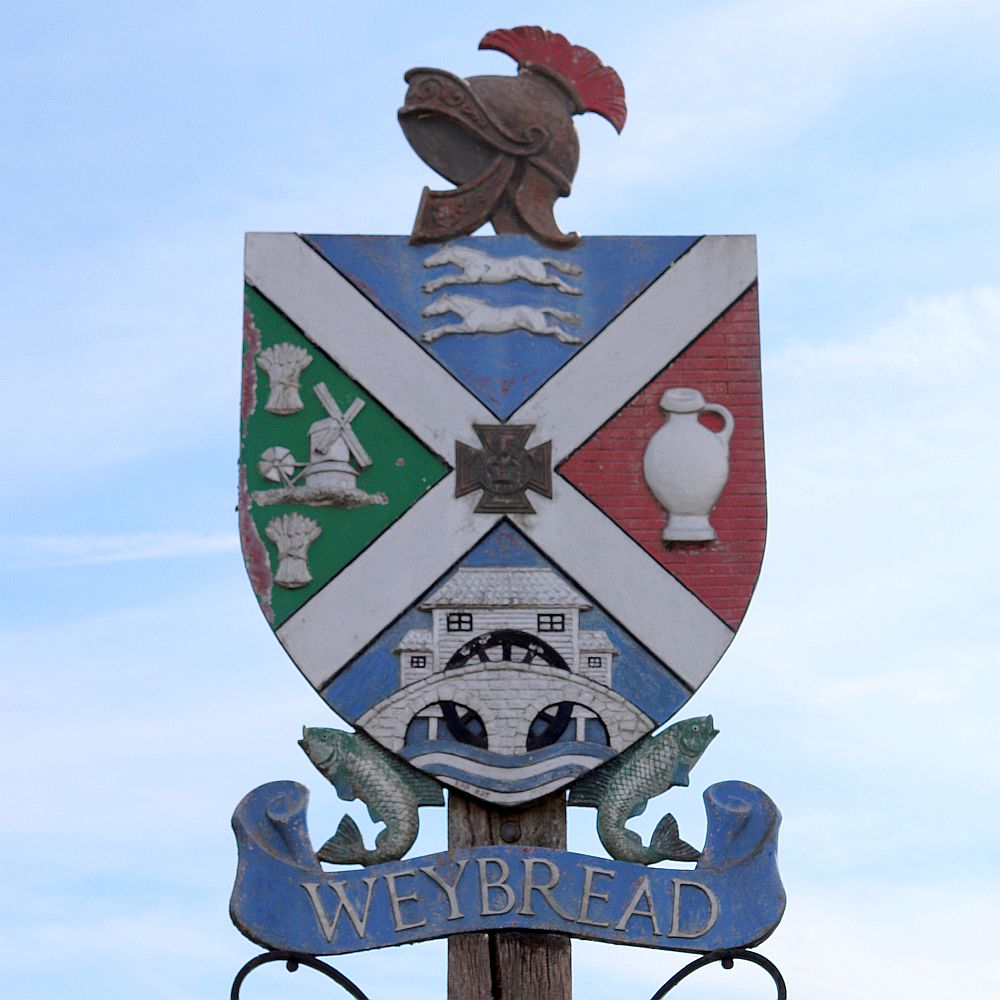
- Weybread village sign

- Location within Suffolk
- Population: 432 (2011 census)
- OS grid reference: TM360695
- Civil parish: Weybread
- District: Mid Suffolk
- Shire county: Suffolk
- Region: East
- Country: England
- Sovereign state: United Kingdom
- Postcode district: IP21
- Dialling code: 01379
- Police: Suffolk
- Fire: Suffolk
- Ambulance: East of England
- UK Parliament: Waveney Valley

Weybread is a village and civil parish in the Mid Suffolk district, in the county of Suffolk, England. It is located on the northern boundary with Norfolk, the River Waveney forming the boundary.

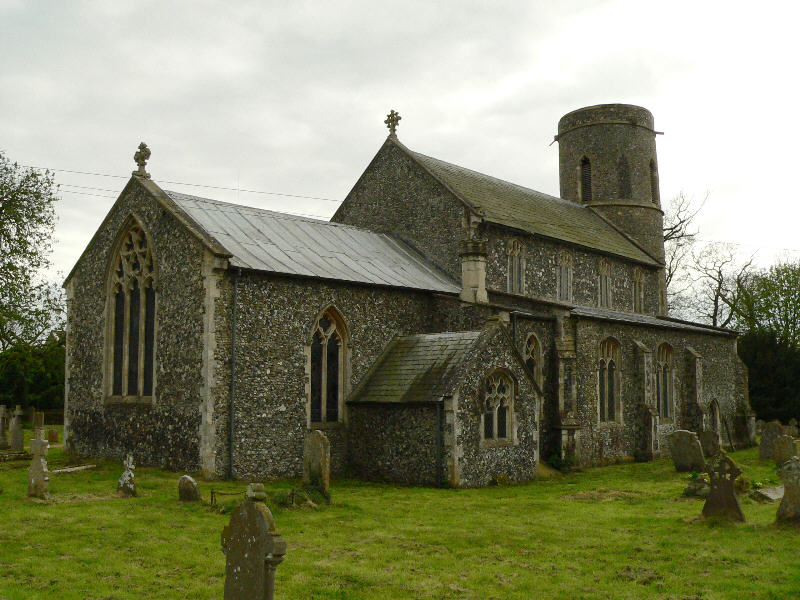
St. Andrew's Church, Weybread

Its church, St. Andrew's, is one of 38 existing round-tower churches in Suffolk. This tower is Norman, but most of the church is from 13th-15th centuries: visible are the gargoyles on the tower and the perpendicular-gothic windows and knapped flint porch.

Weybread formerly had three public houses; the Chequers and the Horseshoe have since closed, leaving only one, the Weybread Crown.

== History ==
In 1086 Weybread was recorded in the Domesday Book as having a population of 65 households, placing it amongst the largest 20% of settlements recorded. Land ownership was divided between William the Conqueror, Robert Malet, Roger of Poitou, William de Beaufeu, Bishop of Thetford, and Bury St Edmunds Abbey. 4 ¾ mills were recorded, 3¾ belonging to Robert Malet and 1 to Roger of Poitou. Clifford Darby has suggested that the other ¼ of a mill was recorded as being in Instead, which has been incorporated into Weybread. Weybread was part of Hoxne Hundred.

== Murders ==
On 3 June 2016 Peter and Sylvia Stuart of Brick Kiln Cottage, Mill Lane were reported missing. The body of Peter Stuart was found the same day in nearby woodland. The body of Sylvia Stuart has never been found. Ali Qazimaj, 42, of Tilbury, Essex, was tried, found guilty, and sentenced to 35 years imprisonment for the double murder.

== Notable people ==
Alfred Ablett VC DCM (3 August 1830 – 12 March 1897), a Crimean War recipient of the Victoria Cross, was born in Weybread and is buried in the churchyard of St. Andrew's. He was the first soldier from Suffolk to be awarded the Victoria Cross
