= Standing on the Rooftop =

Studio album by Madeleine Peyroux
- Released: June 14, 2011
- Recorded: February 2011
- Studios: Sear Sound, New York City
- Genres: Jazz, blues, folk, Americana
- Label: Decca/Universal
- Producer: Craig Street

Madeleine Peyroux chronology
Bare Bones (2009)	Standing on the Rooftop (2011)	The Blue Room (2013)

Standing on the Rooftop is the sixth studio album by American jazz singer Madeleine Peyroux. It was released on June 14, 2011. Peyroux had previously released an EP to promote the album, which included the cover "Martha My Dear" and the new song "The Things I Have Seen Today".

== Recording ==
According to the EPK of the album, Peyroux had made some live demos of the songs and sent them to producer Craig Street, to which he responded well. Having lived in New York City for long periods of time, Peyroux chose to have recording sessions there in February 2011.

This was the first album of Peyroux with Decca and her first with producer Craig Street, interrupting her longtime collaboration with Larry Klein. After Bare Bones, which consisted of only original songs, Standing on the Rooftop featured originals, along with three covers, "Martha My Dear", "I Threw It All Away" and "Love in Vain", plus Marc Ribot's "Lay Your Sleeping Head, My Love", a musical adaptation of a poem by W.H. Auden. It also paired Peyroux with new songwriting partners, like Rolling Stones' bassist Bill Wyman.

== Reception ==
Professional ratings
Review scores
Source	Rating
Allmusic	3.5/5 stars
Paste	(6.3/10)

The album peaked at number three at the Billboard Jazz Albums chart. The album also debuted at number sixty eight on the Canadian Albums Chart.

== Track listing ==
1. "Martha My Dear" (John Lennon, Paul McCartney) – 2:32
2. "The Kind You Can't Afford" (Peyroux, Bill Wyman)– 3:59
3. "Leaving Home Again" (Peyroux, Wyman)– 3:35
4. "The Things I've Seen Today" (Peyroux, Jenny Scheinman)– 3:44
5. "Fickle Dove" (Peyroux, Scheinman)– 3:28
6. "Lay Your Sleeping Head, My Love" (music by Marc Ribot, lyrics by W. H. Auden) – 3:23
7. "Standing on the Rooftop" (David Batteau, Peyroux) – 5:46
8. "I Threw It All Away (Bob Dylan) – 3:15
9. "The Party Oughta Be Comin' Soon" (Peyroux) – 5:00
10. "Superhero" (Jonatha Brooke, Peyroux) – 3:21
11. "Love in Vain" (Robert Johnson) – 3:40
12. "Don't Pick a Fight with a Poet" (Peyroux, Andy Scott Rosen) – 4:28
13. "Meet Me in Rio" (Peyroux) – 3:51
14. "Ophelia" (Batteau, Peyroux) – 5:12
15. "The Way of All Things" (Peyroux) – 4:02

== Personnel ==
- Madeleine Peyroux – vocals
- John Kirby – keyboards
- Glen Patscha – keyboards
- Patrick Warren – keyboards
- Allen Toussaint – piano
- Jenny Scheinman – violin
- Christopher Bruce – guitar
- Marc Ribot – guitar
- Meshell Ndegeocello - bass guitar
- Charley Drayton – drums
- Mauro Refosco – percussion

== Charts ==
=== Weekly charts ===
Weekly chart performance for Standing on the Rooftop
Chart (2011)	Peak position
Australian Jazz & Blues Albums (ARIA)	2
Austrian Albums (Ö3 Austria)	43
Belgian Albums (Ultratop Flanders)	77
Belgian Albums (Ultratop Wallonia)	75
Dutch Albums (Album Top 100)	81
French Albums (SNEP)	61
German Albums (Offizielle Top 100)	64
Greek Albums (IFPI)	25
New Zealand Albums (RMNZ)	35
Scottish Albums (Official Charts)	80
Spanish Albums (Promusicae)	22
Swedish Jazz Albums (Sverigetopplistan)	3
Swiss Albums (Schweizer Hitparade)	57
UK Albums (Official Charts)	56
UK Jazz & Blues Albums (Official Charts)	5
US Top Jazz Albums (Billboard)	3
US Traditional Jazz Albums (Billboard)	3

=== Year-end charts ===
Year-end chart performance for Standing on the Rooftop
Chart (2011)	Position
Australian Jazz & Blues Albums (ARIA)	18
US Top Jazz Albums (Billboard)	29
