= Half the Perfect World =

Studio album by Madeleine Peyroux
- Released: September 12, 2006
- Recorded: April 2006
- Genre: Vocal jazz
- Length: 48:56
- Label: Rounder/Universal
- Producer: Larry Klein

Madeleine Peyroux chronology
Careless Love (2004)	Half the Perfect World (2006)	Bare Bones (2009)

Professional ratings
Review scores
Source	Rating
AllMusic	3.5/5 stars
ARTISTdirect.com	4.5/5 stars
Being There Magazine	3.5/5 stars
The Guardian	4/5 stars
JazzPolice.com	(NR)
Mojo	5/5 stars
musicOMH.com	4/5 stars
Rolling Stone	3/5 stars
inthenews.co.uk	8/10 stars

Half the Perfect World is the fourth studio album by American jazz singer Madeleine Peyroux. It was released on September 12, 2006. It peaked at No. 33 on the Billboard 200 albums chart and had sold 218,000 copies in the United States by December 2008.

The album contains four original songs, all of them co-written by Peyroux, and cover versions of songs by Johnny Mercer, Joni Mitchell, Tom Waits, Charlie Chaplin, Serge Gainsbourg, and Leonard Cohen. "I'm All Right," "A Little Bit" and "Once in a While" were released as singles.

David Dye listed the album at number 10 on World Cafe's list of the top 10 CDs of 2006.

== Track listing ==
1. "I'm All Right" (Walter Becker, Peyroux, Larry Klein) – 3:27
2. "The Summer Wind" (Hans Bradtke, Henry Mayer, Johnny Mercer) – 3:55
3. "Blue Alert" (Leonard Cohen, Anjani Thomas) – 4:10
4. "Everybody's Talkin'" (Fred Neil) – 5:10
5. "River" featuring k.d. lang (Joni Mitchell) – 5:19
6. "A Little Bit" (Jesse Harris, Klein, Peyroux) – 4:02
7. "Once in a While" (Harris, Klein, Peyroux) – 4:00
8. "(Looking for) The Heart of Saturday Night" (Tom Waits) – 3:27
9. "Half the Perfect World" (Cohen, Thomas) – 4:21
10. "La Javanaise" (Serge Gainsbourg) – 4:11
11. "California Rain" (Harris, Klein, Peyroux) – 2:57
12. "Smile" (Charlie Chaplin, Geoffrey Parsons, John Turner) – 3:57

== Personnel ==
- Madeleine Peyroux – vocals, acoustic guitar (tracks 1, 3, 6–8, 10–11)
- Sam Yahel – piano (tracks 2, 4–5, 7, 9–10, 12), Wurlitzer electric piano (1, 3, 6, 8, 11), Hammond organ (1, 3, 6), Estey organ (7, 9–10, 12)
- Larry Goldings – celeste (tracks 3, 10)
- Till Brönner – trumpet (tracks 8, 12)
- Gary Foster – alto saxophone (tracks 2, 9)
- Dean Parks – guitars (exc. track 3; solos on 1, 6), ukulele (1, 11–12)
- Greg Leisz – pedal steel guitar (tracks 8, 11)
- David Piltch – double bass
- Scott Amendola – drums (tracks 2, 5, 9, 12)
- Jay Bellerose – drums (exc. 2, 5, 9, 12), additional cymbals (2, 9)
- String quartet arranged by Mark Orton (tracks 7, 10)

- Carla Kihlstedt – violin
- Graeme Jennings – violin
- Charith Premawardhana – viola
- Sam Bass – cello

== Charts ==
=== Weekly charts ===
Weekly chart performance for Half the Perfect World
Chart (2006)	Peak position
Australian Albums (ARIA)	26
Australian Jazz & Blues Albums (ARIA)	1
Austrian Albums (Ö3 Austria)	42
Belgian Albums (Ultratop Flanders)	41
Belgian Albums (Ultratop Wallonia)	31
Dutch Albums (Album Top 100)	19
French Albums (SNEP)	15
German Albums (Offizielle Top 100)	55
Greek Albums (IFPI)	6
Italian Albums (FIMI)	15
New Zealand Albums (RMNZ)	25
Scottish Albums (OCC)	12
Spanish Albums (PROMUSICAE)	38
Swedish Albums (Sverigetopplistan)	24
Swedish Jazz Albums (Sverigetopplistan)	1
Swiss Albums (Schweizer Hitparade)	41
UK Albums (OCC)	12
UK Jazz & Blues Albums (OCC)	1
US Billboard 200	33
US Top Jazz Albums (Billboard)	1
US Traditional Jazz Albums (Billboard)	1

=== Year-end charts ===
2006 year-end chart performance for Half the Perfect World
Chart (2006)	Position
Australian Jazz & Blues Albums (ARIA)	6
French Albums (SNEP)	151
US Top Jazz Albums (Billboard)	7

2007 year-end chart performance for Half the Perfect World
Chart (2007)	Position
Australian Jazz & Blues Albums (ARIA)	10
US Top Jazz Albums (Billboard)	9

2008 year-end chart performance for Half the Perfect World
Chart (2008)	Position
Australian Jazz & Blues Albums (ARIA)	30

2009 year-end chart performance for Half the Perfect World
Chart (2009)	Position
Australian Jazz & Blues Albums (ARIA)	49

== Certifications ==
Certifications for Half the Perfect World
Region	Certification	Certified units/sales
Brazil (Pro-Música Brasil)	Gold	30,000^{*}
Germany (BVMI)	2× Platinum	40,000^{‡}
New Zealand (RMNZ)	Gold	7,500^{^}
United Kingdom (BPI)	Gold	100,000^{^}
^{*} Sales figures based on certification alone.^{^} Shipments figures based on certification alone.^{‡} Sales+streaming figures based on certification alone.
