= Let's Walk =

Studio album by Madeleine Peyroux
- Released: June 28, 2024
- Recorded: August 13–15 and September 9, 2023
- Studio: The Clubhouse, Rhinebeck, New York
- Genre: Vocal jazz
- Length: 42:13
- Language: English, French ("Et Puis")
- Label: Thirty Tigers
- Producer: Elliot Scheiner, Jon Herington, Madeleine Peyroux

Madeleine Peyroux chronology
Anthem (2018)	Let's Walk (2024)

Let's Walk is a 2024 studio album by American vocal jazz singer Madeleine Peyroux. It has received positive reviews by critics.

== Background ==
Let's Walk centers on the themes of social and political issues.

== Reception ==
Professional ratings
Review scores
Source	Rating
AllMusic	4/5 stars
MusicOMH	4/5 stars
All About Jazz	3.5/5 stars

Editors at AllMusic rated Let's Walk four out of five stars, writing "While Peyroux expertly commands the styles and forms she always has, her wonderful, songwriting elevates Let's Walk to an entirely different level."

MusicOMH writer John Murphy said "American singer-songwriter’s latest offering is a return to form, featuring surprises, diversity and humour."

All About Jazz gave the album a rating score of three and a half out of five.

== Track listing ==
All tracks written by Jon Herington and Madeleine Peyroux

No.	Title	Length
1.	"Find True Love"	4:01
2.	"How I Wish"	4:14
3.	"Let's Walk"	4:52
4.	"Please Come on Inside"	4:52
5.	"Blues for Heaven"	4:17
6.	"Et Puis"	4:02
7.	"Me and the Mosquito"	3:35
8.	"Nothing Personal"	4:12
9.	"Showman Dan"	4:01
10.	"Take Care"	4:03
Total length:		42:09

== Personnel ==
- Madeleine Peyroux – guitar, vocals

Additional musicians

- Guitar, Mandolin, Marimba [Marimba Sample], Synth, Vocals – Jon Herington
- Bass Guitar – Jon Herington (tracks: 6, 7), Paul Frazier
- Clarinet – Stan Harrison (tracks: 8)
- Drums, Percussion – Graham Hawthorne
- Piano, Hammond Organ, Vox Continental Organ, Harmonium, Rhodes Electric Piano, Wurlitzer Organ, Orchestral Bells – Andy Ezrin
- Vocals – Catherine Russell, Cindy Mizelle, Keith Fluitt, Madeleine Peyroux

Technical personnel

- Engineer – Elliot Scheiner, Matthew Scheiner
- Producer – Elliot Scheiner, Jon Herington, Madeleine Peyroux
- Mixing – Elliot Scheiner
- Photography – Ebru Yildiz
