= The Blue Room (Madeleine Peyroux album) =

Studio album by Madeleine Peyroux
- Released: March 5, 2013
- Studio: Market Street, Santa Monica, California, US (strings); The Scoring Stage at Skywalker Sound, Marin County, California, US; The Village Recorder, Los Angeles, California, US
- Genre: Vocal jazz
- Length: 43:01
- Language: English
- Label: Decca/EmArcy
- Producer: Larry Klein

Madeleine Peyroux chronology
Standing on the Rooftop (2011)	The Blue Room (2013)	Keep Me in Your Heart for a While: Best of Madeleine Peyroux (2014)

The Blue Room is a 2013 studio album by American jazz musician Madeleine Peyroux. It has received positive reviews by critics.

== Reception ==
Editors at AllMusic rated this album 4 out of 5 stars, with critic Thom Jurek writing that Peyroux has "the perfect collaborators" on this album, making "a brave experiment, but one that pays off handsomely". In American Songwriter, Hal Horowitz rated this release 3 out of 5 stars, favorably comparing Peyroux's vocals to Billie Holiday, stating that "it’s doubtful there will be a better make-out album released this year" but critiquing that "the effect shifts from sophisticated to just short of snooze inducing as the disc wears on and what starts out as tasty ends up as more of the same when the vibe stays locked in its classy, stylish, chill out groove". In The Independent, Andy Gill praised several tracks, particularly the Ray Charles covers, which "are engaging".

Sam Shepherd of musicOMH rated The Blue Room 3.5 out of 5 stars and stated that "there are a few misses... and it is sometimes a little too languid, but generally Peyroux’s homage to a masterful musician finds the right tones". At PopMatters, Steve Horowitz scored this release a 7 out of 10, praising how producer Larry Klein "keeps everything velvety soft, but the mix of old and new keeps... The Blue Room sounding fresh" but continues that Peyroux's "effort does not break new ground" although "the music itself is quite gorgeous" and results in "excellent results". Slant Magazine's Ted Scheinman stated that "the trancey singularity of pace won’t please everyone" but "the album bears no trace of a dud" and he rated The Blue Room 4 out of 5 stars. In The Washington Post, Jeff Wisser stated that this release "crackles with energy and musical tension, and stands as Peyroux’s most accomplished, mature work to date".

== Track listing ==
1. "Take These Chains from My Heart" (Hy Heath and Fred Rose) – 3:13
2. "Bye Bye Love" (Boudleaux Bryant and Felice Bryant) – 3:28
3. "Changing All Those Changes" (Buddy Holly) – 3:10
4. "Born to Lose" (Frankie Brown) – 4:28
5. "Guilty" (Randy Newman) – 3:51
6. "Bird on the Wire" (Leonard Cohen) – 5:37
7. "I Can't Stop Loving You" (Don Gibson) – 4:18
8. "Gentle on My Mind" (John Hartford) – 6:42
9. "You Don’t Know Me" (Eddy Arnold and Cindy Walker) – 4:02
10. "Desperados Under the Eaves" (Warren Zevon) – 4:19

== Personnel ==
- Madeleine Peyroux – acoustic guitar on "Take These Chains from Me", "Changing All Those Changes", and "I Can’t Stop Loving You"; vocals

Additional musicians

- Jay Bellerose – drums, percussion on "Bye Bye Love", "Changing All Those Changes", "Guilty", and "Gentle on My Mind"
- Larry Goldings – Wurlitzer electric piano on "Take These Chains from Me", "Bye Bye Love", "I Can’t Stop Loving You", and "You Don’t Know Me"; Hammond B-3 organ on "Take These Chains from Me", "Bye Bye Love", "Changing All Those Changes", "Guilty", and "I Can’t Stop Loving You"; piano on "Born to Lose", "Guilty", "Bird on the Wire", "Gentle on My Mind", and "Desperados Under the Eaves"
- Dean Parks – electric guitar; acoustic guitar on "Take These Chains from Me", "Bye Bye Love", "Changing All Those Changes", "Born to Lose", "Bird on the Wire", "I Can’t Stop Loving You", and "You Don’t Know Me"; pedal steel guitar on "Take These Chains from Me", "Born to Lose", "Guilty", "Bird on the Wire", "I Can’t Stop Loving You", "Gentle on My Mind", "You Don’t Know Me", and "Desperados Under the Eaves"; high strung acoustic guitar on "Guilty"
- David Piltch – bass
- John "Scrapper" Sneider – trumpet on "Born to Lose" and "You Don’t Know Me"

Technical personnel

- Michael Cuscuna – liner notes
- Bernie Grundman – audio mastering at Bernie Grundman Mastering
- Helik Hadar – engineering, mixing at Market Street, Santa Monica, California, United States
- Larry Klein – rhythm arrangement, production
- Leslie Ann Jones – audio engineering on strings
- Michael Lau-Robles – graphics
- Mary Maurer – design
- Vince Mendoza – strings arrangement and conducting on "Take These Chains from Me", "Born to Lose", "Guilty", "Bird on the Wire", "Gentle on My Mind", "You Don’t Know Me", and "Desperados Under the Eaves"
- Chris Owens – assistant audio engineering
- Cindi Peters – coordination
- Rocky Schenck – photography
- Dann Thompson – assistant audio engineering on strings

== Chart performance ==
The Blue Room reached 28 on the French charts according to Syndicat National de l'Édition Phonographique.

== Charts ==
Chart performance for The Blue Room
Chart (2013)	Peak position
Austrian Albums (Ö3 Austria)	54
Belgian Albums (Ultratop Flanders)	42
Belgian Albums (Ultratop Wallonia)	50
Dutch Albums (Album Top 100)	67
French Albums (SNEP)	28
German Albums (Offizielle Top 100)	65
Italian Albums (FIMI)	78
Scottish Albums (OCC)	50
Spanish Albums (PROMUSICAE)	31
Swiss Albums (Schweizer Hitparade)	82
UK Albums (OCC)	43
US Billboard 200	62

== See also ==
- 2013 in American music
- List of 2013 albums
- Modern Sounds in Country and Western Music, a 1962 album by Ray Charles with several songs re-recorded on this album
