= Bare Bones (Madeleine Peyroux album) =

Studio album by Madeleine Peyroux
- Released: March 10, 2009
- Recorded: Late 2006-08
- Genre: Jazz
- Label: Rounder/Universal
- Producer: Larry Klein

Madeleine Peyroux chronology
Half the Perfect World (2006)	Bare Bones (2009)	Standing on the Rooftop (2011)

Professional ratings
Review scores
Source	Rating
AllMusic	4/5 stars
The Guardian	4/5 stars
Slant	4/5 stars

Bare Bones is the fifth studio album by American jazz singer Madeleine Peyroux. It was released on March 10, 2009.

The album received both critical and public acclaim. It received favourable reviews and the lyrics were praised. Commercially, it reached number 1 on the Jazz charts and entered on the Billboard 200 at number 71. The album debuted and peaked at number 12 on the Official UK Albums Chart.

All the songs were written or co-written by Peyroux. According to her, the album is an attempt to resume her philosophy of life and she started working on it after the release of Half the Perfect World.

== Song information ==
- The album opens with "Instead", a retro-tune with a positive message ("Instead of feeling bad/be glad/You're not on your own"), which resembled old Depression-Era songs.
- The second track, the title song, supposedly inspired by a passage from a book by Buddhist nun Pema Chödrön, "When Things Fall Apart: Heartfelt Advice for Difficult Times", contains Shakespearian references: "Old Hamlet's done now, dead and gone, and there's no ghost walks/Poor Yorick tells ya everything he knows with no tongue to talk".
- "Damn the Circumstances" is a slow-tempo song, which critics considered to be one of the "most memorable and enchanting songs of the album".
- "River of Tears", written by Peyroux in collaboration with her producer Larry Klein, sings about her father who "could sit and drink the way a monk could pray", while she also seems to invite listeners to listen to some smooth jazz. On this track, Peyroux resembles Joni Mitchell.
- "You Can't Do Me" was the first single of the album, released in February 2009. Although, as of March 25, 2009, it hasn't been released in any EP or video clip. It is an up-tempo, jazz-rock song, with the recognisable help of Walter Becker. The song makes reference to T.S. Eliot's The Love Song of J. Alfred Prufrock.
- The sixth track, "Love and Treachery", was considered by a critic as the "song Leonard Cohen never wrote".
- "Our Lady of Pigalle", a classic song, is the scenario of a woman being propositioned walking around the streets of Paris late at night, referencing her to being a symbol of salvation. A version in French, "Notre Dame de Pigalle", was released as a bonus track in the Japanese Edition.
- In "Homeless Happiness", fans are introduced to the singer's past experiences while she went busking through Europe. It talks about the advantages of living a simple life with "No worries, no hurries".
- "To Love You All Over Again" is just in the right place on the track listing, balancing the sad songs with a more cheery rhythm.
- "I Must Be Saved" is written solely by Peyroux. It is a love song that talks about how someone can lose everything, even the things they never thought they would lose, but they will always be saved. Peyroux dedicated this song to folk singer Odetta, her "spiritual grandmother", who died on December 2, 2008.
- The album closes with "Somethin' Grand", which was written in "support of the new era with Barack Obama".

== Track listing ==
1. "Instead" (Julian Coryell, Madeleine Peyroux) – 5:13
2. "Bare Bones" (Walter Becker, Larry Klein, Peyroux) – 3:26
3. "Damn the Circumstances" (David Batteau, Klein, Peyroux) – 4:37
4. "River of Tears" (Klein, Peyroux) – 5:21
5. "You Can't Do Me" (Becker, Klein, Peyroux) – 5:04
6. "Love and Treachery" (Joe Henry, Klein, Peyroux) – 4:20
7. "Our Lady of Pigalle" (Batteau, Klein, Peyroux) – 5:28
8. "Homeless Happiness" (Coryell, Peyroux) – 3:59
9. "To Love You All Over Again" (Batteau, Peyroux) – 3:59
10. "I Must Be Saved" (Peyroux) – 4:45
11. "Somethin' Grand" (Klein, Sean Wayland, Peyroux) – 3:44

== Personnel ==
- Madeleine Peyroux – vocals, acoustic guitar
- Dean Parks – electric guitar
- Jim Beard – piano
- Larry Goldings – Hammond and Estey organ (on all tracks exc. 6, 8, 9)
- Larry Klein – bass
- Vinnie Colaiuta – drums, percussion
- Carla Kihlstedt – violin (on tracks 4, 5, 7, 9, 11), trumpet and Nyckelharpa (7)
- Luciana Souza and Rebecca Pidgeon – backing vocals (on track 5)

== Charts ==
=== Weekly charts ===
Weekly chart performance for Bare Bones
Chart (2009)	Peak position
Australian Albums (ARIA)	64
Australian Jazz & Blues Albums (ARIA)	1
Austrian Albums (Ö3 Austria)	42
Belgian Albums (Ultratop Flanders)	49
Belgian Albums (Ultratop Wallonia)	40
Dutch Albums (Album Top 100)	33
French Albums (SNEP)	18
German Albums (Offizielle Top 100)	75
Irish Albums (IRMA)	70
Italian Albums (FIMI)	36
New Zealand Albums (RMNZ)	28
Scottish Albums (Official Charts)	15
Spanish Albums (Promusicae)	39
Swedish Jazz Albums (Sverigetopplistan)	1
Swiss Albums (Schweizer Hitparade)	46
UK Albums (Official Charts)	12
UK Jazz & Blues Albums (Official Charts)	1
US Billboard 200	71
US Top Jazz Albums (Billboard)	1
US Indie Store Album Sales (Billboard)	12
US Traditional Jazz Albums (Billboard)	1

=== Year-end charts ===
2009 year-end chart performance for Bare Bones
Chart (2009)	Position
Australian Jazz & Blues Albums (ARIA)	13
French Albums (SNEP)	193
US Top Jazz Albums (Billboard)	15

2010 year-end chart performance for Bare Bones
Chart (2010)	Position
Australian Jazz & Blues Albums (ARIA)	24
