= William Galison =

American harmonica player (born 1958)

William Alexander Galison (born February 19, 1958) is an American harmonica player.

== Early life ==
Galison was born and raised in New York City. As a child, he started to study piano, but at the age of eight he decided to switch to guitar, having been inspired by the Beatles. He developed a love of jazz in high school and attended Berklee College of Music in Boston. He decided to change to the harmonica because "I was one of a million guitarists at Berklee" and it was easy to carry around. He was Berklee's only harmonica player. He toured extensively in Europe with Billy Leadbelly (Bill Gough from Hatfield UK). Among his role models at the time were Toots Thielemans and Stevie Wonder.

After Berklee, he studied at Wesleyan University, then returned to New York City in 1982.

He performed at various New York venues, including The Village Gate, The Blue Note and the Lone Star Cafe with jazz musicians Jaco Pastorius and Jaki Byard. He also played with his own group at Preacher's Cafe in Greenwich Village.

== Collaborations and recordings ==
Galison has worked with Carly Simon, Sting, Barbra Streisand, Peggy Lee, Chaka Khan, Steve Tyrell, and Astrud Gilberto. He performed Gordon Jacob's "Suite for Harmonica and Orchestra" and toured the US in the Broadway musical Big River. He has recorded soundtracks for films, including Academy Award nominees The Untouchables and Bagdad Café. His harmonica is also heard on the Sesame Street theme ("a great honor") and commercials. Other television work includes Oz and Saturday Night Live.

One of his major influences and role models, Toots Thielemans, once described him as "the most original and individual of the new generation of harmonica players".

== Got You On My Mind and Madeleine Peyroux ==
In 2002, Galison met jazz singer and guitarist Madeleine Peyroux in a bar in Greenwich Village. They started to play music together and eventually moved in together.

By the end of the year Peyroux had moved out and the couple had broken up, but they continued playing together and recorded a seven-song CD called Got You on My Mind in February 2003. Peyroux's contract with Rounder Records prohibited her from selling the Got You on My Mind recording, and she stopped performing with Galison. Galison continued to sell the recording and claimed that he was owed payment for canceled performances. After threatened legal action from Peyroux's lawyer, Galison sued Peyroux, the lawyer, and Rounder.

== Discography ==
=== As leader or co-leader ===
- Overjoyed (Polygram, 1988)
- Midnight Sun (Eclipse Collage, 1997)
- Waking Up with You (JVC, 2000)
- Got You on My Mind with Madeleine Peyroux (Wake Up Music, 2004)

=== As sideman ===
- 1990 Music Inside, Joyce
- 1990 There'll Be Another Spring, Peggy Lee
- 1991 Talking Hands, Deborah Henson-Conant
- 1991 Tony Terry, Tony Terry
- 1992 Baby I'm Yours, Maureen McGovern
- 1992 Temporary Road, John Gorka
- 1992 The Woman I Am, Chaka Khan
- 1993 Songs of My Life, Ruth Brown
- 1994 Tropical Escape, Craig Peyton
- 1994 Foot On The Road, Toninho Horta
- 1995 Amor, Jon Secada
- 1995 Thanks, Ivan Neville
- 1995 The Web, Craig Peyton
- 1996 Mortal City, Dar Williams
- 1997 Closer, Mondo Grosso
- 1997 End of the Summer, Dar Williams
- 1997 I Thought About You, Christy Baron
- 1997 Montevideo, Rubén Rada
- 1997 Night in Time: Live, Peter Gallway
- 1997 Ride, Louise Taylor
- 1997 Sing Me a Story, Bob McGrath
- 1998 From Ton to Tom, Toninho Horta
- 2000 Steppin' , Christy Baron
- 2000 Written in Red, Louise Taylor
- 2001 Love Letters, Janet Seidel
- 2002 Cine Passion, Quadro Nuevo
- 2003 Count Your Blessings, Barbara Cook
- 2003 The Movie Album, Barbra Streisand
- 2004 Company, Jeanette MacDonald
- 2004 On the Moon, Peter Cincotti
- 2005 Luna Rossa, Quadro Nuevo
- 2005 Moonlight Serenade, Carly Simon
- 2005 Twilight of the Renegades, Jimmy Webb
- 2007 Fifteen Seconds of Grace, Victoria Clark
- 2008 A Day in the Life of a Mother and Wife, Cat Guthrie
- 2008 Faith Trust and Pixie Dust, Kerry Butler
- 2008 This Kind of Love, Carly Simon
- 2008 To Jobim with Love, Toninho Horta
- 2012 Old LP, Bob Telson
- 2012 Sunken Condos, Donald Fagen
