= Dreamland (Madeleine Peyroux album) =

1996 studio album by Madeleine Peyroux

Studio album by Madeleine Peyroux
- Released: October 1, 1996
- Studio: RPM (New York City) (Note: Tracks 1–3, 5–7, 9, 10 and 12); Unique (New York City) (Note: Tracks 4, 8 and 11); Kampo (New York City) (Note: Additional tracking); EastSide (New York City)
- Genre: Jazz
- Length: 39:41
- Label: Atlantic
- Producer: Yves Beauvais; Greg Cohen

Madeleine Peyroux chronology
Dreamland (1996)	Got You on My Mind (2004)

Dreamland is the debut studio album by American singer Madeleine Peyroux, released on October 1, 1996, by Atlantic Records.

The album debuted at No. 36 on Billboard's Heatseekers Albums chart on February 8, 1997, and fell to No. 46 the following week. As of January 2005, it had sold 200,000 copies worldwide.

== Critical reception ==
Professional ratings
Review scores
Source	Rating
AllMusic	3.5/5 stars
Robert Christgau	(1-star Honorable Mention)
Tom Hull	B+
Orlando Sentinel	4/5 stars

The Orlando Sentinel wrote: "For all its elegance, Peyroux's vocal style doesn't seem fully developed yet. However, on Dreamland, she shows exquisite taste and great promise." Time said that "Peyroux has a bittersweet, brokenhearted alto; she lingers and slides off notes, finding emotion in the slow, sad fade rather than the obvious vocal burst." Tucson Weekly called the album "a staggering mix of blues, folk and jazz styles." City Pages concluded that Peyroux "can make the most exalted and exacting homages reflect the rustlings of her own soul."

In December 2005, the Observer Music Monthly ranked the album at number 48 on their list of top 100 albums.

== Track listing ==
No.	Title	Writer(s)	Length
1.	"Walkin' After Midnight"	Don Hecht; Alan Block	4:49
2.	"Hey Sweet Man"	Madeleine Peyroux	4:03
3.	"I'm Gonna Sit Right Down and Write Myself a Letter"	Joseph Young; Fred Ahlert	3:43
4.	"(Getting Some) Fun Out of Life"	Joseph Burke; Edgar Leslie	3:12
5.	"La Vie en rose"	Louiguy; Édith Piaf	3:22
6.	"Always a Use"	Peyroux	2:42
7.	"A Prayer"	Euston Jones	2:37
8.	"Muddy Water"	Peter de Rose; Harry Richman; Joe Trent	3:31
9.	"Was I?"	Chick Endor; Charlie Farrell	2:47
10.	"Dreamland"	Peyroux	3:31
11.	"Reckless Blues"	Bessie Smith; Jack Gee	3:04
12.	"Lovesick Blues" (cover of "My Sweetie Went Away")	Smith; Irving Mills; Cliff Friend	2:20

Japanese promotional edition bonus track
No.	Title	Writer(s)	Length
10.	"At the Christmas Ball"	Fred Longshaw	3:18

== Personnel ==
=== Musicians ===
- Madeleine Peyroux – vocals (all tracks); guitar (tracks 4, 8, 9, 12)
- Marc Ribot – electric guitar (tracks 1, 3, 10); Dobro (tracks 2, 6); acoustic guitar (track 5); banjo (track 9)
- James Carter – tenor saxophone (tracks 1, 3); bass clarinet (track 8)
- Charlie Giordano – Hammond B3 organ (track 1); harmonium (tracks 2, 7); accordion (tracks 5, 9); harpsichord (tracks 3, 10); Mellotron (track 10)
- Greg Cohen – bass (tracks 1, 9, 10); bass marimba (track 3); bowed bass (track 7); arrangement (tracks 1–3, 5–7, 9, 10, 12)
- Kenny Wollesen – drums (tracks 1, 3, 9, 10); percussion (track 1); parade cymbals, marching bass drum (track 7)
- Marcus Printup – trumpet (tracks 2, 7)
- Cyrus Chestnut – piano (tracks 4, 8, 11)
- Steve Kirby – bass (tracks 4, 8)
- Leon Parker – drums (track 4); cymbal (track 8)
- Regina Carter – violin (tracks 5, 9)
- Vernon Reid – electric guitar (track 8)
- Larry Saltzman – electric guitar (track 10)

=== Technical ===
- Michael Krowiak – engineering (tracks 1–3, 5–7, 9, 10, 12)
- Michael O'Reilly – engineering (tracks 4, 8, 11); mixing (all tracks)
- Ted Jensen – mastering
- Yves Beauvais – production
- Greg Cohen – production
- Rachael Fite – production coordination

=== Artwork ===
- Thomas Bricker – art direction
- Lynn Kowalewski – design
- Daniel Miller – photography

== Charts ==
Chart performance for Dreamland
Chart (1997)	Peak position
US Heatseekers Albums (Billboard)	36
