= Secular Hymns =

Studio album by Madeleine Peyroux
- Released: September 16, 2016
- Recorded: January 12–13, 2016
- Studio: Parish Church of Saint Mary the Virgin, Great Milton, England, UK
- Genre: Vocal jazz
- Length: 33:31
- Language: English
- Label: Impulse!
- Producer: Madeleine Peyroux

Madeleine Peyroux chronology
Keep Me in Your Heart for a While: Best of Madeleine Peyroux (2014)	Secular Hymns (2016)	Anthem (2018)

Secular Hymns is a 2016 studio album by American vocal jazz singer Madeleine Peyroux. It has received positive reviews by critics.

== Reception ==
Editors at AnyDecentMusic? rated this album a 7.2 out of 10, aggregating six scores. According to the review aggregator Metacritic, Secular Hymns received "generally favorable reviews" based on a weighted average score of 79 out of 100 from six critic scores.

Editors at AllMusic rated this album 4 out of 5 stars, with critic Matt Collar writing that this album "finds the vocalist/guitarist delivering a stripped-down, largely acoustic set of warm, eclectic cover tunes... that's a 180-degree turn from her previous effort, 2013's ambitious homage to Ray Charles, The Blue Room. At The Arts Desk, Mark Kidel rated this album 3 out of 5 stars and characterized Peyroux as a "sultry cabaret chanteuse with shades of late-night jazz and the endemic melancholy of the blues" but complains that "this is blues lite, too clean for comfort". DownBeat's J. Poet gave 5 out of 5 stars to Secular Hymns and praised the ensemble on this recording: "Herington’s guitar adds blue, sliding, sustained notes that echo the crying tone of a steel guitar to support Peyroux’s somber vocal". John Fordham of The Guardian praised the combination of "intimate exuberance and classic songs" captured in the live-in-studio setting and rated this release 4 of 5 stars.

In The Irish Times Cormac Larkin rated Secular Hymns 3 out of 5 stars, ending "they’re the sort of songs that can sound hollow and insincere in the wrong hands, but Peyroux delivers every word like her life depends on it". Christopher Loudon of JazzTimes called the blending of blues music, Gospel music, and jazz "a marvelous mélange". The Observer's Dave Gelly scored this release 4 of 5 stars for "the warm intimacy of her voice and the incisive clarity of the arrangements". Writing for PopMatters, Steve Horowitz a 7 out of 10, summing up that "Peyroux offers fine performances, but they are hers and not the originals" and these songs are "mostly well-known classics from the past—they aren’t records meant to be broken but to be replayed again for their own merits".

== Track listing ==
1. "Got You on My Mind" (Howard Biggs and Joe "Cornbread" Thomas) – 4:30
2. "Tango Till They’re Sore" (Thomas Alan Waits) – 3:24
3. "The Highway Kind" (Townes Van Zandt) – 2:47
4. "Everything I Do Gonh Be Funky (From Now On)" (Allen Toussaint) – 3:16
5. "If the Sea Was Whiskey" (Leonard Caston and Willie Dixon) – 3:07
6. "Hard Times Come Again No More" (Stephen Foster) – 4:17
7. "Hello Babe" (Lil Green and Kansas Joe McCoy) – 3:11
8. "More Time" (Linton Kwesi Johnson) – 3:23
9. "Shout Sister Shout" (Bill Doggett, Lucky Millinder, and Sister Rosetta Tharpe) – 2:42
10. "Trampin’" (traditional) – 3:01

== Personnel ==
- Madeleine Peyroux – acoustic guitar, vocals, arrangement on "Trampin'", production, liner notes

Additional musicians

- Jon Herington – electric guitar, vocals, arrangement on "Hard Times Come Again No More"
- Barak Mori – upright bass, vocals

Technical personnel

- Cynthia Herbst – session coordination
- Daniel Herst – session assistance
- Doug Dawson – audio engineering
- Farida Bachir – session coordination
- Francesca Burton – session assistance
- Fred Gillham – session coordination
- Joe Jones – assistant engineering
- Mary Maurer – design at 2310 Design
- Michael Lau Robles – design at 2310 Design
- Shervin Lainez – photography
- Staurt Bruce – audio engineering, mixing, audio mastering at Bruce Audio, Bradford On Avon, England, United Kingdom
- Yves Beauvais – sequencing

== Charts ==
Chart performance for Secular Hymns
Chart (2016)	Peak position
Belgian Albums (Ultratop Flanders)	137
Belgian Albums (Ultratop Wallonia)	53
French Albums (SNEP)	32
German Albums (Offizielle Top 100)	93
Portuguese Albums (AFP)	22
Scottish Albums (OCC)	77
Spanish Albums (PROMUSICAE)	70
Swiss Albums (Schweizer Hitparade)	64
UK Albums (OCC)	96

== See also ==
- 2014 in American music
- List of 2014 albums
