= Anthem (Madeleine Peyroux album) =

Studio album by Madeleine Peyroux
- Released: August 31, 2018
- Studio: Brooklyn Recording, Brooklyn, New&York City, New York, US; Strange Cargo, West Los Angeles, California, US; Sunset Sound, Hollywood, California, US; The Village, Westwood, California, US
- Genre: Vocal jazz
- Length: 59:31
- Language: English, French ("Liberté")
- Label: Decca
- Producer: Larry Klein

Madeleine Peyroux chronology
Secular Hymns (2016)	Anthem (2018)	Let's Walk (2024)

“It’s meant to be blurred and unclear. I took the colours of the American flag and placed them in a way that didn’t represent any particular flag – or any political policy – that I could find. I wanted to evoke a question: where do you stand? I’m questioning what we believe in and what we think democracy means and how we intend to continue to create it.”

— Madeleine Peyroux on making an album cover that does not feature her on the cover and political themes on these songs.

Anthem is a 2018 studio album by American vocal jazz singer Madeleine Peyroux. It has received positive reviews by critics.

== Reception ==
Editors at AllMusic rated this album 3.5 out of 5 stars, with critic Matt Collar writing that "Anthem finds the former busker turned chanteuse collaborating with a team of highly regarded musicians, arrangers, and songwriters" to make songs that "seem to speak to Peyroux's particularly Zen view of the world." Writing for The Arts Desk, Mark Kidel rated Anthem 4 out of 5 stars, telling readers that "if you happen to be feeling blue, this music will speak to you, truly, deeply." In Glide Magazine, Jim Hynes called this album "a stunning example of collaboration producing an uncategorizable, enduring work of art."

== Track listing ==
All songs written by David Baerwald, Larry Klein, Brian Macleod, Madeleine Peyroux, and Patrick Warren, except where noted.

1. "On My Own" – 4:06
2. "Down on Me" – 5:00
3. "Party Tyme" – 4:37
4. "Anthem" (Leonard Cohen) – 5:25
5. "All My Heroes" – 3:59
6. "On a Sunday Afternoon" – 4:17
7. "The Brand New Deal" – 4:57
8. "Lullaby" – 5:22
9. "Honey Party" – 4:01
10. "The Ghosts of Tomorrow" – 4:14
11. "We Might as Well Dance" – 3:17
12. "Liberté" (Paul Eluard) – 4:32
13. "Last Night When We Were Young" – 5:44

== Personnel ==
- Madeleine Peyroux – guitar, vocals, arrangements, artwork

Additional musicians

- David Baerwald – electric guitar, nylon string guitar, shouts
- Jay Bellerose – drums on "We Might as Well Dance", percussion on "We Might as Well Dance"
- Gabe Burch – assistant engineering
- Chris Cheek – baritone saxophone, tenor saxophone
- Jivan Gasparyan – duduk
- Clydene Jackson – backing vocals
- Gabriel Johnson – trumpet
- Larry Klein – bass guitar, guitar, keyboards, percussion, shouts, sounds, arrangements, production
- Pete Kuzma – Hammond organ, shouts
- Brian Macleod – drums, percussion, shouts
- Grégoire Maret – bass harmonica, chromatic harmonica
- Andy Martin – trombone
- Dean Parks – acoustic guitar, electric guitar, hi string guitar, pedal steel, shouts
- John "Scrapper" Sneider – trumpet, shouts
- Luciana Souza – percussion, shaker, tambourine, triangle
- Patrick Warren – dulcitone, harmonium, piano, Wurlitzer piano, shouts, string arrangements
- Julia Waters – backing vocals
- Maxine Waters – backing vocals

Technical personnel

- Tchad Blake – mixing on all tracks except "Liberté"
- Jeffrey Clayton – assistant engineering
- Adam Greenspan – audio engineering
- Bernie Grundman – audio mastering
- Hadidja Mahamoud – project coordination
- Mary Maurer – design
- Geoff Neal – assistant engineering
- Michael Lau Robles – design
- Roderick Shearer – audio engineering, mixing on "Liberté"
- Ivy Skoff – project coordination
- Andy Taub – audio engineering

== Charts ==
Chart performance for Anthem
Chart (2018)	Peak position
Belgian Albums (Ultratop Wallonia)	159
French Albums (SNEP)	142
German Albums (Offizielle Top 100)	88
Portuguese Albums (AFP)	46
Scottish Albums (OCC)	61

== See also ==
- 2018 in American music
- List of 2018 albums
