= Instead, Suffolk =

Coordinates: 52.374°N 1.296°E

Instead
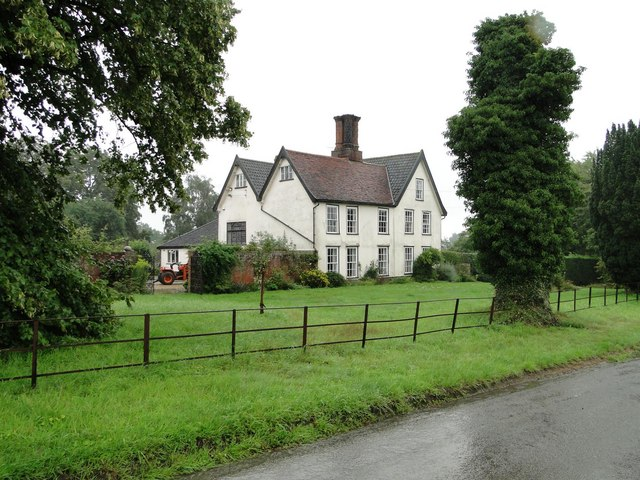
- Instead Manor in 2010

- Location within Suffolk
- OS grid reference: TM223807
- Civil parish: Weybread
- District: Mid Suffolk
- Shire county: Suffolk
- Region: East
- Country: England
- Sovereign state: United Kingdom
- Postcode district: IP21
- Dialling code: 01379
- Police: Suffolk
- Fire: Suffolk
- Ambulance: East of England
- UK Parliament: Waveney Valley

Instead is a settlement in the north west part of Weybread, in the Mid Suffolk district, in Suffolk, England, it was recorded in the Domesday Book of 1086. It is included marshland along the banks of the River Waveney which constituted the border with Needham, Norfolk.

== History ==
With a recorded population of two households, it was amongst the smallest 20% of settlements recorded in the Domesday Book.In 1066 the manor belonged to Æthelmær of Elmham, however he had been removed by 1086 and manor then belonged to William the Conqueror It was in the Hoxne Hundred.
