= Rosie Vela =

American model, actress, singer and songwriter (born 1952)

- Born: Roseanne Vela; December 18, 1952 (age 73); Galveston, Texas, U.S.
- Occupations: Model; actress; singer; songwriter
- Years active: 1975–present
- Modeling information
- Height: 5 ft 8 1/2 in (1.74 m)
- Hair color: Red/blonde
- Eye color: Green

Roseanne Vela (born December 18, 1952) is an American model, actress, singer and songwriter.

== Early life, education and modeling career ==
Roseanne Vela was born on December 18, 1952, in Galveston, Texas. Her family later moved to Arkansas, where she attended the University of Arkansas. While studying art and music, Vela also began modeling. She married the Arkansas-born musician Jimmy Roberts, but he died of cancer shortly after. Following this, Vela moved to New York, where her modeling career took off and she graced the covers of magazines including Vogue and Newsweek from 1975 onwards, and appeared in numerous television commercials.

Vela has also appeared in several films, including Heaven's Gate (as the "beautiful girl" with whom Kris Kristofferson's character falls in love during Harvard's graduation ceremony scene), The Two Jakes with Jack Nicholson and Inside Edge opposite Michael Madsen.

== Music ==
Turning her attention to music, Vela built a home recording studio for herself and signed a recording contract with A&M Records. She released her debut album, Zazu, in 1986. The entire album was written or co-written by Vela and was produced by Gary Katz. It included contributions from both Donald Fagen and Walter Becker (two of Vela's musical heroes) six years after they had disbanded their group Steely Dan. Though the album was critically acclaimed, it went largely unnoticed in the US. It fared better in Europe and a single from the album ("Magic Smile") was a top 30 hit on the UK Singles Chart. The album itself peaked at No. 20 on the UK Albums Chart and was certified silver by the BPI in March 1987. Further singles "Interlude" and "Fool's Paradise" met with less success.

It has been reported that Vela recorded a second album, entitled Sun Upon the Altar, but the album remains unreleased.

Following Zazu, Vela did not release any further recordings but has since become a backing vocalist for other musicians including Electric Light Orchestra on their 2001 album Zoom. Vela also performed a few shows with the band and was in a relationship with ELO's frontman Jeff Lynne for seven years. Vela co-wrote "A Woman Like That" with Lynne for the 1998 film Still Crazy.

== See also ==
- Zoom Tour Live
