= The Lost Wandering Blues and Jazz Band =

US street music group

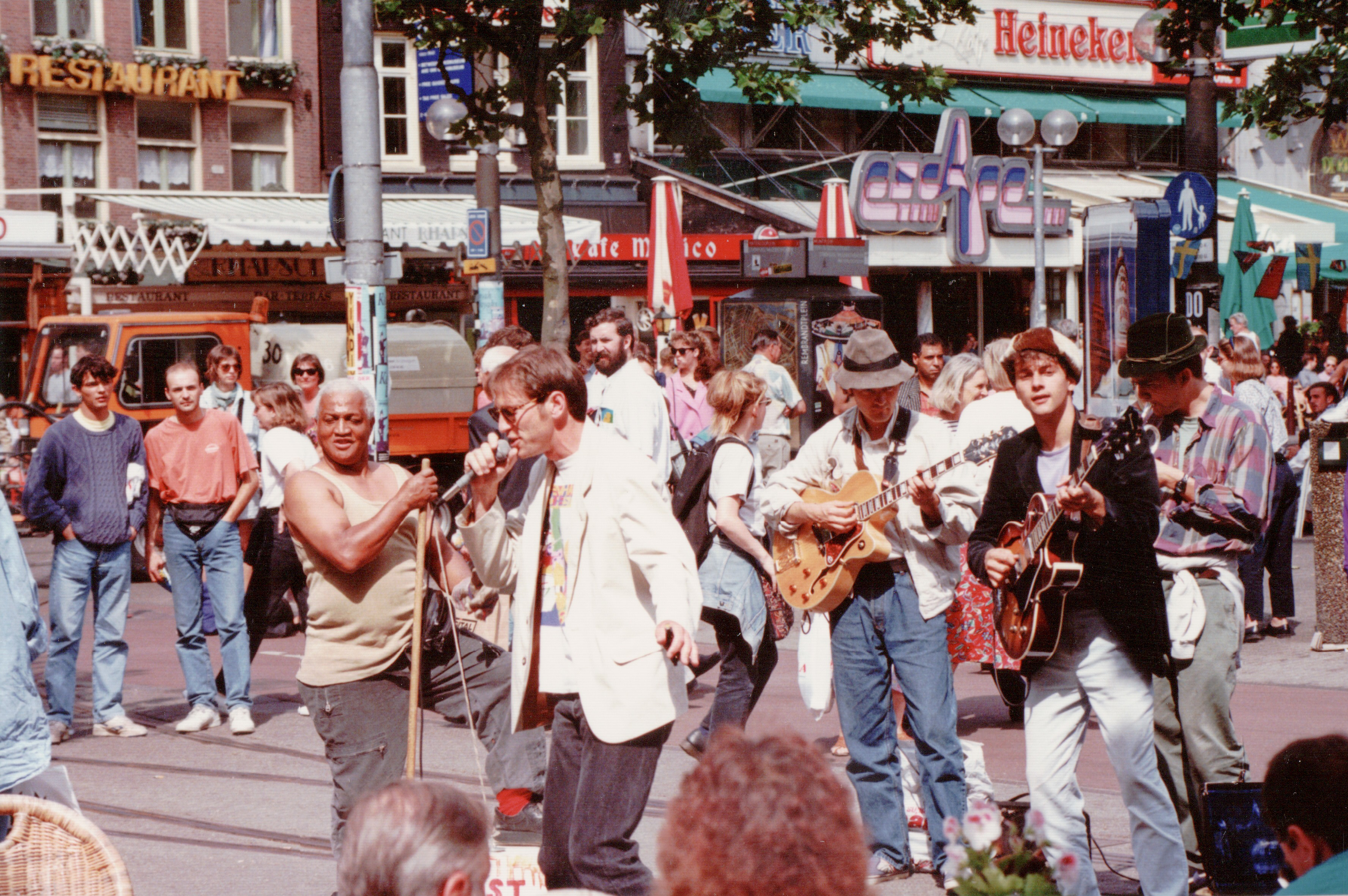
Danny Fitzgerald and The Lost Wandering Blues and Jazz Band in Amsterdam in 1992

The Lost & Wandering Blues and Jazz Band was a group of street musicians playing a variety of musical styles on washtub bass, trumpet, and guitar. The band consisted of Danny Fitzgerald, Eugene Semyon Clarke, David Alexander Shore, Madeleine Peyroux, and Frank Schaap.

== Band members ==
- Danny Fitzgerald (musician) was the band leader. He was born June 10, 1933, in Kingston, New York, US.
- Eugene Semyon Clark was born November 2, 1965, in Chapel Hill, North Carolina, US.
- David Alexander Shore was born August 3, 1979, in Stockholm, Sweden.
- Madeleine Peyroux was the vocalist and was born in 1974 in Athens, Georgia, US.
- Frank Schaap was born May 5, 1952, in New York City, New York, US, and raised from an early age in Kentucky, US.

== Discography ==
- Spreading Rhythm Around
- Best Of
