= Zazu (album) =

Studio album by Rosie Vela
- Released: 1986
- Genre: Pop rock
- Length: 39:23
- Label: A&M
- Producer: Gary Katz

Professional ratings
Review scores
Source	Rating
AllMusic	4/5 stars

Zazu (1986) is the debut (and, to date, only) album released by American model, singer and songwriter Rosie Vela. The album was produced by Gary Katz, best known for his work in that capacity with Steely Dan, and many of the songs feature Steely Dan's Donald Fagen on keyboards and Walter Becker on guitar. Tony Levin plays Chapman Stick on the songs "Tonto" and "Zazu".

Despite receiving positive reviews and the single "Magic Smile" reaching No. 29 on the Billboard Adult Contemporary chart, Zazu was a commercial failure in Vela's native United States. However it was more successful in Europe, notably in the United Kingdom where it reached No. 20 on the national albums chart and earned a Silver disc. The single "Magic Smile" was also a UK Top 30 hit. The CD album has been out of print in North America and Europe since the early 1990s but was rereleased in the UK by Cherry Red Records in 2011.

In addition to "Magic Smile", two other tracks ("Interlude" and "Fool's Paradise") were also released as singles.

== Track listing ==
All tracks are written by Rosie Vela, except where noted.

No.	Title	Length
1.	"Fool's Paradise"	4:00
2.	"Magic Smile"	4:23
3.	"Interlude"	4:04
4.	"Tonto"	5:38
5.	"Sunday"	4:30
6.	"Taxi"	3:25
7.	"2nd Emotion" (Vela, Fritz Doddy, Jeb Guthrie, Jock Guthrie)	4:45
8.	"Boxs"	3:52
9.	"Zazu"	4:46
Total length:		39:23

== Personnel ==
=== Musicians ===
- Rosie Vela – lead vocals (all tracks), synthesizer (1–4), background vocals (2, 7)
- Michael Been – guitar (1, 5–6, 8)
- Walter Becker – lead guitar (3), guitar (9), synthesizer (4)
- Rick Derringer – rhythm guitar (3), guitar (4, 6–8)
- Neil Stubenhaus – bass guitar (1)
- Jimmy Haslip – bass guitar (2–9)
- Donald Fagen – synthesizer (1–6, 9)
- Aaron Zigman – synthesizer (1, 3, 5–6, 8–9)
- Larry Fast – synthesizer (6)
- Jim Keltner – drums (1), additional drums (2, 5–9)
- Jimmy Bralower - drums (2–9), additional drums (1), percussion (1, 7)
- Yogy Horton – additional drums (5)
- Chat Vela – drums (9)
- Joy Askew – background vocals (2, 7)
- Jenny Peters – background vocals (7)
- Tony Levin – Chapman Stick (4, 9)

=== Production ===
- Gary Katz – producer
- Daniel Lazerus, Wayne Yurgelun – engineer [Assistant Mix], technician [digital]
- Mike Cosmai, Tim Hatfield – engineer [assistant]
- Elliot Scheiner – engineer [mix]
- Bob Ludwig – mastering
- Richard Corman – photography

== Singles ==
Single	Year	Formats	Track listing
"Magic Smile"	1986	7-inch, 12-inch	"Magic Smile" (4:26) (7-inch, 12-inch); "2nd Emotion" (4:47) (7-inch, 12-inch); "Boxs" (3:55) (12-inch)
"Interlude"	1986	7-inch, 12-inch	"Interlude" (4:07) (7-inch, 12-inch); "Taxi" (3:27) (7-inch, 12-inch); "Tonto" (5:40) (12-inch)
"Fool's Paradise"	1987	7-inch, 12-inch	"Fool's Paradise" (4:04) (7-inch, 12-inch); "Interlude" (4:07) (7-inch, 12-inch); "Fool's Paradise (New 12" Version)" (4:30) (12-inch)
