= LeRoy W. Henderson, Jr. =

American photographer b. 1936

- Born: 1936 (age 89–90); Richmond, Virginia
- Known for: Photography

LeRoy W. Henderson, Jr. (born 1936, Richmond, Virginia) is an American photographer. He attended the Pratt Institute and the School of Visual Arts. He is known for his documentary photography of the civil rights movement and the anti-war movement.

Henderson's work was included in the 2025 exhibition Photography and the Black Arts Movement, 1955–1985 at the National Gallery of Art. Also in 2025 Henderson was the recipient of a Gordon Parks Foundation Legacy Acquisition Fund grant.

His work is in the collection of the Art Institute of Chicago, and the Brooklyn Museum.
