= Madeleine Peyroux =

American jazz musician (born 1974)

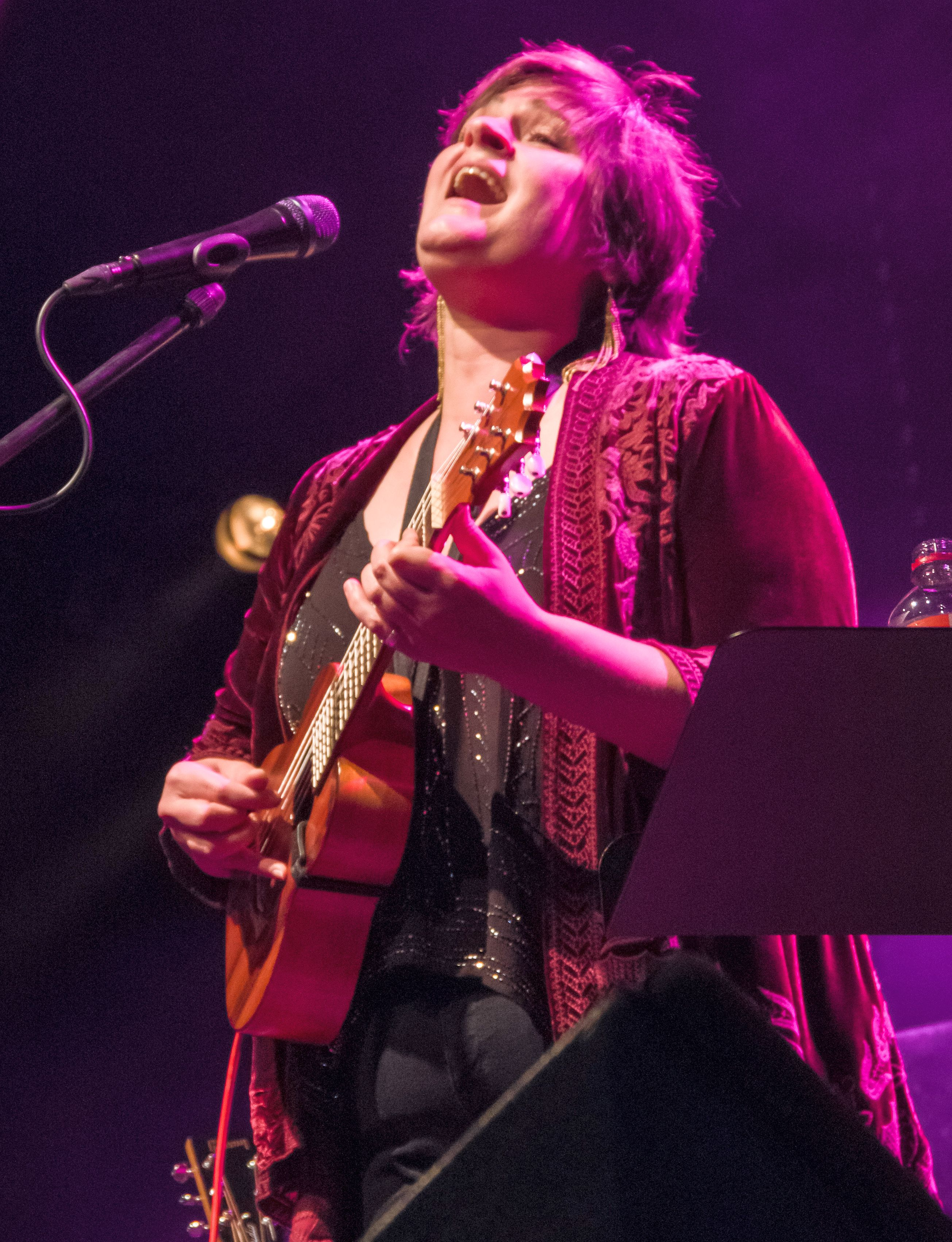
- Peyroux performing in 2019

Background information
- Born: April 19, 1974 (age 52); Athens, Georgia, U.S.
- Genres: Jazz, pop
- Occupation: Singer-songwriter
- Instruments: Guitar
- Years active: 1990s–present
- Labels: Atlantic, Rounder, Decca
- Formerly of: The Lost Wandering Blues and Jazz Band
- Website: madeleinepeyroux.com

Madeleine Peyroux (/pəˈruː/ pə-ROO; born April 19, 1974) is an American jazz singer and songwriter who began her career as a teenager on the streets of Paris. She sang vintage jazz and blues songs before finding mainstream success in 2004 when her album Careless Love sold half a million copies.

== Music career ==
A native of Athens, Georgia, Peyroux grew up in New York and California, before moving to Paris at the age of 11–12. In interviews, she has called her parents "hippies" and "eccentric educators" who helped her pursue a career in music. As a child, she listened to her father's old records and learned to play her mother's ukulele.

When she was thirteen, Peyroux's parents divorced, and she moved with her mother to Paris, France. Two years later she began singing with street musicians in the Latin Quarter. She joined a vintage jazz group called the Riverboat Shufflers, then The Lost Wandering Blues and Jazz Band, with whom she toured Europe.

== Discovery and breakthrough ==
Peyroux was discovered by a talent agent from Atlantic Records, which released her debut album, Dreamland (1996). She recorded cover versions of songs from the 1930s and '40s (Billie Holiday, Bessie Smith, Fats Waller) with a group of seasoned musicians: James Carter, Cyrus Chestnut, Leon Parker, Vernon Reid, and Marc Ribot. A year later she covered the song "Life is Fine" for a Rainer Ptacek tribute album.

In 2004 she released the EP Got You on My Mind with William Galison. Her second full-length album, Careless Love, was released by Rounder Records and produced by Larry Klein. Careless Love was certified gold by the Recording Industry Association of America (RIAA) after having sold half a million copies. It included songs by musicians such as Bob Dylan, Hank Williams, and Leonard Cohen. Klein produced her next album, Half the Perfect World, which was recorded with Jesse Harris, k.d. lang, and Walter Becker. Half the Perfect World reached No. 33 on the Billboard magazine Top 200 albums chart. Klein and Becker returned to work with Peyroux on her album Bare Bones (Rounder, 2009). She wrote all the songs on the album, co-writing some with Klein and Becker and Julian Coryell. Two years later, Standing on the Rooftop was released by Decca Records, produced by Craig Street, and recorded with Christopher Bruce, Charley Drayton, Meshell Ndegeocello, Marc Ribot, Jenny Scheinman, and Allen Toussaint.

In her guitar playing, Peyroux eschews the use of a plectrum or fingerpicks, and uses effects sparingly.

== Later career ==
In 2004, the release of Peyroux's planned second album was delayed because of problems with her vocal cords. These were attributed to over-use of her voice as a result of intensive touring. After discovering a cyst on her vocal cords, she needed surgery, and attempted to recover by re-training her voice. She stated that it took years to rebuild her voice, and she considered giving up singing.

In 2006, she successfully released Half the Perfect World, and in the same year performed a live session at Abbey Road Studios, UK, which was released on the album Live from Abbey Road. During the next year she won Best International Jazz Artist at the BBC Jazz Awards.

== Reception ==
In 2013 a New York Times music writer compared her vocal style to that of Billie Holiday, Ella Fitzgerald, and Edith Piaf. Her song "A Prayer" appeared in the television show Deadwood (2005), and her version of "J'ai deux amours" was included in the film Diplomacy (2014).

== Discography ==
=== Solo ===
Albums and details	Peak positions												Certifications
Albums and details	AUS	AUT	BEL (Fl)	BEL (Wa)	FRA	GER	NED	NZ	SPA	SWI	UK	US	Certifications
Dreamland: Date released: 1996; Record label: Atlantic	—	—	—	—	—	—	—	—	—	—	—	—	
Careless Love: Date released: 2004; Record label: Rounder	26	—	54	33	28	—	18	—	91	—	7	71	ARIA: Gold
Half the Perfect World: Date released: 2006; Record label: Rounder	26	42	41	31	15	55	19	25	38	41	12	33	
Bare Bones: Date released: 2009; Record label: Rounder	64	42	49	40	18	75	33	28	39	46	12	71	
Standing on the Rooftop: Date released: 2011; Record label: EmArcy/Decca	—	43	77	75	61	64	81	35	22	57	56	—	
The Blue Room: Date released: 2013; Record label: EmArcy/Decca	—	54	42	50	28	65	67	—	31	82	43	62	
Keep Me in Your Heart for a While: Best of Madeleine Peyroux: Date released: 2014; Record label: Rounder	—	—	—	—	115	—	—	—	—	—	—	—	
Secular Hymns: Date released: 2016; Record label: Verve	—	—	137	53	53	93	—	—	70	64	96	—	
Anthem: Released: 2018; Label: Pennywell, Decca	—	—	—	—	—	88	—	—	—	—	—	—	
Let's Walk: Released: 2024; Label: Just One Recording	—	—	—	—	—	—	—	—	—	—	—	—	

=== Collaborations and guest appearances ===
With William Galison

- Got You on My Mind (Waking Up, 2004)

With The Lost Wandering Blues and Jazz Band

- Spreading Rhythm Around

With The Sachal Ensemble

- Song of Lahore (Universal, 2016)
