= The Star Maker =

The Star Maker or Starmaker may refer to:

== Film ==
- The Star Maker (1939 film), American musical comedy
- The Star Maker, a 1968 American-German drama starring Wendell Corey
- The Star Maker (1981 film), American drama starring Rock Hudson
- The Star Maker (1995 film), Italian drama; Oscar nominee

== Television ==
- "The Star Maker", 1957 episode of American TV sitcom (List of The George Burns and Gracie Allen Show episodes)
- "Star Maker", British 1974 teleplay; music adapted for Soap Opera (album)
- Star Maker (Sailor Moon), character on 1991–97 Japanese manga series
- Star Academy, also known as Starmaker, a Dutch-developed reality television talent show format launched in 2001
- "Star Maker", 2006 episode of British TV serial Holby City (series 8)
- P. Diddy's Starmaker, an American musical reality MTV series

== Literature ==
- Star Maker, 1937 science fiction novel by English philosopher Olaf Stapledon
- Star Maker, 1959 biography of D. W. Griffith by American author Homer Croy
- Starmaker: Leviathan, British comic created by Adam Hamdy; published in 2009

== Music ==
- Starmaker (album), a compilation album by Tommy Dorsey
- Starmaker (song), a song by Bruce Roberts, and a 1982 single by The Kids from "Fame"
- "Star Maker", 1990 song by Dutch pop artist Diana van Berlo
- "Starmaker", 2012 solo album by American saxophonist Lou Marini

== Businesses ==
- Starmaker (home video distributor), 1990s American entertainment company
