= Pretzel Logic =

Studio album by Steely Dan
- Released: February 20, 1974
- Recorded: October 1973 – January 1974
- Studios: Village Recorder, Los Angeles, California; Cherokee Studios, Chatsworth, Los Angeles
- Genres: Jazz rock; jazz pop; pop rock; jazz blues
- Length: 33:45
- Label: ABC
- Producer: Gary Katz

Steely Dan chronology
Countdown to Ecstasy (1973)	Pretzel Logic (1974)	Katy Lied (1975)

Singles from Pretzel Logic
- 1. "Rikki Don't Lose That Number" Released: April 25, 1974; 2. "Pretzel Logic" Released: October 1974

Pretzel Logic is the third studio album by American rock band Steely Dan, released on February 20, 1974, by ABC Records. It was recorded at the Village Recorder in West Los Angeles, California, with producer Gary Katz. The album was the last to be made and released by the group while it was still an active touring band, and the last to feature the band's full quintet lineup of Walter Becker, Donald Fagen, Denny Dias, Jim Hodder, and Jeff "Skunk" Baxter (who subsequently left to join the Doobie Brothers), though it also features significant contributions from many prominent Los Angeles-based studio musicians, and consequently the five band members all have reduced roles compared to their previous albums. No individual track on Pretzel Logic uses all five members of Steely Dan, and some only use two or three.

A commercial and critical success, the single "Rikki Don't Lose That Number" helped restore Steely Dan's radio presence after the disappointing performance of its predecessor, and became their biggest hit. The tour accompanying Pretzel Logic's release was extremely stressful for Becker and Fagen, who then retired Steely Dan as a touring act and dissolved the original quintet. Pretzel Logic was reissued on CD in 1987, and remastered in 1999, to retrospective acclaim.

== Recording and production ==
Like Steely Dan's previous albums, Pretzel Logic was recorded at the Village Recorder in West Los Angeles, produced by Gary Katz, and written primarily by Walter Becker and Donald Fagen.

The album marked the beginning of Becker's and Fagen's roles as the sole members of Steely Dan; the pair enlisted prominent Los Angeles-based studio musicians to record numerous overdubs. Before production began, Becker and Fagen met with Jim Hodder, Steely Dan's founding drummer, and told him they planned to use session musician Jim Gordon to record the drums for the album. Although Hodder still received financial compensation as a band member, being sidelined deeply upset him, and he would often attend the recording sessions for Pretzel Logic despite not being allowed to play. Becker and Fagen did allow Hodder a shot at playing drums on one track, "Night by Night", but despite numerous takes he was unable to deliver a performance that had what Becker and Fagen wanted, and they decided they needed another drummer. With it now the middle of the night, Denny Dias, one of Steely Dan's two guitarists, suggested nineteen-year-old Jeff Porcaro, who showed up at the session with his friend and frequent keyboardist collaborator, David Paich. Hodder's sole contribution to Pretzel Logic was some background vocals on "Parker's Band".

Becker and Fagen were having difficulty coming up with new songs, so in addition to recording a cover song ("East St. Louis Toodle-Oo") for the only time in Steely Dan's history, they used three older songs, written before Steely Dan was formed: "Barrytown", "Parker's Band", and "Charlie Freak". Though credited jointly to Becker and Fagen, "Barrytown" was written solely by Fagen, and is about Barrytown, New York, a small town near Fagen's alma mater of Bard College. "Parker's Band" has drums by both Porcaro and Gordon, who was one of the young Porcaro's musical heroes. The composition of "Charlie Freak" is unchanged from Becker and Fagen's 1960s demo recording of the song, though the arrangement on the Pretzel Logic recording is more elaborate.

In addition to electric guitar, Jeff Baxter played pedal steel guitar and percussion. The string section-like sounds on "Charlie Freak" were created by Baxter's pedal steel guitar, with distortion applied.

Becker had been playing around with the Duke Ellington tune "East St. Louis Toodle-Oo" for years. For the recording, Becker used an electric guitar with a talk box to imitate Bubber Miley's plunger-muted trumpet part, Baxter used his pedal steel guitar to imitate Tricky Sam Nanton's trombone solo, and Fagen played the clarinet solo on piano.

After costs grew prohibitive at the Village Recorder, the project moved to the new Cherokee Studios in Chatsworth, Los Angeles.

Becker and Fagen wanted the album to have a title connoting the seedy, sexual side of life, but could not come up with anything they liked, so they just named it after one of the songs on the album.

== Music and lyrics ==
Pretzel Logic contains shorter, more concise songs than Steely Dan's previous album, Countdown to Ecstasy (1973), as the group had decided to attempt to produce complete musical statements within the three-minute pop-song format. Music critic Robert Christgau wrote that the album's solos are "functional rather than personal or expressive, locked into the workings of the music".

The music on the album is characterized by harmonies, counter-melodies, and bop phrasing, and often relies on straightforward pop influences. The album employs funk (represented by "Night by Night" and "Monkey in Your Soul") and shuffle (represented by "Pretzel Logic"), two styles previously unexplored by Steely Dan. The syncopated piano line that opens "Rikki Don't Lose That Number" develops into a pop melody, and the title track transitions from a blues song to a jazzy chorus.

Steely Dan often incorporated jazz into its music during the 1970s. "Rikki Don't Lose That Number" appropriates the bass pattern from Horace Silver's 1965 song "Song for My Father", and "Parker's Band" features riffs influenced by Charlie Parker and a lyric paying tribute to his work. Though many fans assumed "Parker's Band" was about a homosexual orgy due to Steely Dan's frequent exploration of outlandish sexual topics and lyrics such as "You won't believe what the boys are blowing" and "We will spend a dizzy weekend smacked into a trance", it is actually an ode to the jazz music experience. The lyrics have numerous references specific to Charlie Parker (of whom Becker and Fagen were fans), including: "Savoy sides" (referring to the label Savoy Records, for which Parker recorded), "Kansas City born and growing" (Parker was born in Kansas City, Kansas and raised in Kansas City, Missouri), the Parker recordings "Groovin' High" and "Relaxin' at Camarillo", and the "dizzy weekend" line, which in fact refers to Parker's heroin addiction.

Baxter's guitar playing drew on jazz and rock and roll influences. Certain songs on the album incorporate additional instrumentation, including exotic percussion, violin sections, bells, and horns. Victor Feldman played a flapamba solo to introduce "Rikki Don't Lose That Number" on the album, but this intro was removed from the single release upon orders from ABC Records.

Fagen described "Through with Buzz" as a "very saccharine sounding track with a very cynical lyric", which he said is about a platonic relationship that comes to an end when one of the participants believes he is being taken advantage of, and becomes paranoid. The narrator's hostility towards Buzz is comically childish; for instance, in the final verse he calls Buzz a "fairy" (a derogatory slur for a homosexual), despite having a few lines earlier accused Buzz of stealing his girlfriend.

Steely Dan biographer Anthony Robustelli opined that "With a Gun" is the most country flavored of any Steely Dan song. The lyrics are the second-person account of a hapless loser who addresses all his problems with murder.

"Charlie Freak" recounts the tale of a vagrant drug-addict who sells his only possession—a gold ring—to the opportunistic narrator for a small sum so he can buy his drug of choice, on which he fatally overdoses. Hearing of this, the narrator goes to the morgue and returns the gold ring to the dead man. Writing for Something Else!, S. Victor Aaron remarked that "Charlie Freak" is unique in the Steely Dan songbook due to the earnest and poignant approach of the music and lyrics, explaining, "[Becker and Fagen] usually resort to ironic humor to get their point across about human failings, but there is no humor in 'Charlie Freak'. Just heavyhearted irony." Robustelli similarly commented that the song's concluding "with a sad yet hopeful sentiment that is neither sarcastic nor cynical shows a rare glimpse into another side of their writing."

== Packaging ==
The idea for the album's cover to feature a photo of a New York pretzel vendor was conceived by Steely Dan's vocalist/keyboardist Donald Fagen and producer Gary Katz. The photo was taken by Raeanne Rubenstein, a photographer of musicians and Hollywood celebrities. She took it on the west side of Fifth Avenue at 79th Street, just above the 79th Street Transverse (the road through Central Park), at the park entrance called "Miners' Gate". The vendor in the photo refused to sign a release, but upon investigation ABC learned the vendor was selling without a license, and concluded that they could publish the photo without fear of his taking legal action.

The inside photo of the band was taken by Ed Caraeff at his house in the hills of Coldwater Canyon. He tilted the photo paper while developing to create the elongated effect.

== Marketing and sales ==
Pretzel Logic was released by ABC Records on February 20, 1974, and sold well. In the United States, it spent 36 weeks on the Billboard 200, topping out at number 8. It became Steely Dan's third album to be certified Gold by the Recording Industry Association of America (RIAA). After the disappointing performance of the singles from Countdown to Ecstasy, the album restored the group's radio presence with the single "Rikki Don't Lose That Number", which became the biggest hit of its career, peaking at number four on the Billboard Hot 100. On September 7, 1993, Pretzel Logic was certified Platinum by the RIAA, recognizing the shipment of one million copies in the U.S.

== Critical reception ==
Retrospective professional reviews
Review scores
Source	Rating
AllMusic	5/5 stars
Chicago Tribune	4/4 stars
Christgau's Record Guide	A+
Encyclopedia of Popular Music	5/5 stars
The Great Rock Discography	9/10
Music Story	5/5 stars
MusicHound Rock	4.5/5
The Rolling Stone Album Guide	5/5 stars
Tom Hull – on the Web	A+
Uncut	5/5 stars

The album was critically praised at the time of its release. Bud Scoppa of Rolling Stone magazine called the album's "wonderfully fluid ensemble sound" unprecedented in popular music, and said the ambiguous lyrics "create an emotionally charged atmosphere, and the best are quite affecting." Down Beat wrote that "there are no better rock recording groups [than Steely Dan] in America, and damn few worldwide." Robert Christgau wrote in Creem that "The music can be called jazzy without implying an insult, and Donald Fagen and Walter Becker are the real world's answer to Robert Hunter and Jerry Garcia [of the Grateful Dead]." In a mixed review, Noel Coppage of Stereo Review was impressed by the album's music but wrote that "the lyrics baffle me; maybe they know what they're talking about, but I can't get a clue."

At the end of 1974, Pretzel Logic was named NME magazine's album of the year. It was also voted the second-best album of 1974 in Pazz & Jop, an annual poll of prominent critics published by The Village Voice. Christgau, who created Pazz & Jop, ranked Pretzel Logic number one on his own year-end list, and later wrote that the album encapsulated Steely Dan's "chewy perversity as aptly as its title", with vocals by Fagen that "seem like the golden mean of pop ensemble singing, stripped of histrionics and displays of technique, almost [...] sincere, modest."

In The All-Music Guide to Rock (1995), Rick Clark gave the album five stars out of five, writing, "On Pretzel Logic Steely Dan most successfully synthesized their love for jazz into their dense pop/rock sound." Allmusic's Stephen Thomas Erlewine called the album Steely Dan's "richest" and wrote that Becker's and Fagen's songwriting was "seamless while remaining idiosyncratic and thrillingly accessible." Patrick McKay of Stylus Magazine called the album "superb" and said it found Becker and Fagen "relying instead on crack studio musicians that could realize their increasingly complex compositions". Rob Sheffield, wrote in The Rolling Stone Album Guide (2004) that, when making Pretzel Logic, "Steely Dan's songwriting and Fagen's singing were at their peak of fluid power: The whole album is flawless".

Pretzel Logic has appeared on retrospective "greatest albums" lists. In 1994, it was voted number 67 in Colin Larkin's book All Time Top 1000 Albums, with Larkin calling the album's mix of jazz, R&B, and pop styles "highly inventive" and "greater than the sum of its parts"; it fell to number 292 in the update of the ranking from the year 2000. In 2003, the album ranked 385th on Rolling Stone's list of the "500 Greatest Albums of All Time"; it dropped to 386th on the 2012 update of the list. The album was also included in the book 1001 Albums You Must Hear Before You Die.

== Tour ==
Steely Dan's tour to support Pretzel Logic went on for 53 U.S. dates and five UK dates (their first appearances outside of the U.S.) from March 1, 1974 until July 5, 1974. The touring band consisted of the five members of Steely Dan, plus Royce Jones (percussion and vocals), Michael McDonald (Wurlitzer electric piano and vocals), and Jeff Porcaro (drums, along with Jim Hodder); Porky and Bucky from Steely Dan's previous tour were dismissed because Becker and Fagen decided that having female backing vocalists was "too showbiz". The performances often used different lead singers than the studio recordings; ordered with songs from Pretzel Logic first, the songs in the setlist were:

- "Rikki Don't Lose that Number" (lead vocal by Fagen)
- "Any Major Dude Will Tell You" (lead vocal by Jones)
- "Barrytown" (lead vocal by Fagen)
- "Pretzel Logic" (lead vocals by Fagen and McDonald)
- "Do It Again" (lead vocal by Fagen)
- "Dirty Work" (lead vocal by Jones)
- "Reelin' in the Years" (lead vocal by Fagen)
- "Brooklyn (Owes the Charmer Under Me)" (lead vocal by Jones)
- "Bodhisattva" (lead vocals by Fagen, Jones, and McDonald)
- "The Boston Rag" (lead vocal by Fagen)
- "Show Biz Kids" (lead vocal by McDonald)
- "My Old School" (lead vocal by Baxter)
- "King of the World" (lead vocal by Fagen)
- "This All Too Mobile Home" (lead vocal by Fagen)

The Pretzel Logic tour was more hectic and grueling than Steely Dan's previous tours, and as their fame built from the success of the album and the single "Rikki Don't Lose that Number", Becker and Fagen became uncomfortable with the intense interest of their fans, who attempted to access the backstage through skylights and fire escapes and in some cases crushed fellow audience members against the front of the stage. Becker and Fagen felt guilty about being the cause of these incidents, and faced additional stresses from financial negotiations between their management and the record label and the lack of any profit from their touring. The UK leg of the tour was scheduled to be 12 dates, but the last 7 dates were cancelled due to Fagen's medical condition, which seemed to be exacerbated by stress. A month later Steely Dan played 8 more U.S. dates, and then Becker and Fagen dissolved the original band and withdrew from touring.

== Track listing ==
All tracks are written by Walter Becker and Donald Fagen, except where noted.

Side one
No.	Title	Writer(s)	Length
1.	"Rikki Don't Lose That Number"		4:32
2.	"Night by Night"		3:38
3.	"Any Major Dude Will Tell You"		3:07
4.	"Barrytown"		3:20
5.	"East St. Louis Toodle-Oo"	Duke Ellington, Bubber Miley	2:47

Side two
No.	Title	Length
6.	"Parker's Band"	2:37
7.	"Through with Buzz"	1:32
8.	"Pretzel Logic"	4:31
9.	"With a Gun"	2:17
10.	"Charlie Freak"	2:44
11.	"Monkey in Your Soul"	2:40
Total length:		33:45

== Personnel ==
Steely Dan

- Donald Fagen – keyboards (including solo on 5), alto saxophone (5), lead and backing vocals
- Walter Becker – bass, guitar (5, 8, including solo on 8), backing vocals
- Jeff "Skunk" Baxter – electric and pedal steel guitars (including solos on 1–3, 5, 11), hand drums
- Denny Dias – electric guitar (including solo on 6)
- Jim Hodder – backing vocals (6)

Additional musicians

- Timothy B. Schmit – backing vocals (1, 4, 8)
- Michael Omartian – piano (1, 10)
- David Paich – clavinet (2)
- Ben Benay – guitar
- Dean Parks – guitar, banjo
- Wilton Felder – bass
- Chuck Rainey – bass (3)
- Plas Johnson, Jerome Richardson, Ernie Watts – saxophone
- Ollie Mitchell – trumpet
- Lew McCreary – trombone
- Jim Gordon – drums (all tracks except 2)
- Jeff Porcaro – drums (2), additional drums (6)
- Victor Feldman – percussion, flapamba (1)
- Roger Nichols – gong (5)

Production

- Gary Katz – producer
- Roger Nichols – engineer
- Jimmie Haskell – orchestration
- Ed Caraeff – art direction and inside photo
- Raeanne Rubenstein – cover photo
- David Larkham – design
- Kudo III – personal management
- Karen Stanley – security

Reissue

- Vartan – art direction
- Michael Diehl – design
- Daniel Levitin – consultant

== Charts ==
=== Album ===
==== Weekly charts ====
Chart (1974)	Peak position
Australian Albums (Kent Music Report)	18
Canada Top Albums/CDs (RPM)	5
New Zealand Albums (RMNZ)	23
UK Albums (Official Charts)	37
US Billboard Top LPs & Tape	8

Chart (2025–2026)	Peak position
Greek Albums (IFPI)	46

==== Year-end charts ====
Chart (1974)	Position
Canada Top Albums/CDs (RPM)	47
US Billboard 200	41

=== Singles ===
Year	Single	Catalogue number	Peak position	Chart
1974	"Rikki Don't Lose That Number" (B-side: "Any Major Dude Will Tell You")	ABC 11439	4	US Billboard Hot 100
1974	"Pretzel Logic" (3:59 edit) (B-side: "Through with Buzz")	ABC 12033	57	US Billboard Hot 100

== Bibliography ==
- English, Timothy (2007). Sounds Like Teen Spirit: Stolen Melodies, Ripped-Off Riffs, and the Secret History of Rock and Roll. iUniverse. ISBN 978-0595906925.
- Morse, Tim (1998). Classic Rock Stories: The Stories Behind the Greatest Songs of All Time. Macmillan. ISBN 1429937505.
- Rees, Dafydd; Crampton, Luke (1991). Rock Movers & Shakers. ABC-CLIO. ISBN 0874366615.
- Robustelli, Anthony (2017). Steely Dan FAQ: All that's Left to Know about this Elusive Band. Milwaukee, WI: Backbeat Books. ISBN 9781495025129.
- Sheffield, Rob; et al. (November 2, 2004). Brackett, Nathan; Hoard, Christian (eds.). The New Rolling Stone Album Guide (4th ed.). Simon & Schuster. ISBN 0-7432-0169-8.
- Uslan, Michael; Clark, Dick; Solomon, Bruce (1981). Dick Clark's The First 25 Years of Rock & Roll. Dell Publishing. ISBN 044051763X.
