= Ellingtonia, Vol. One =

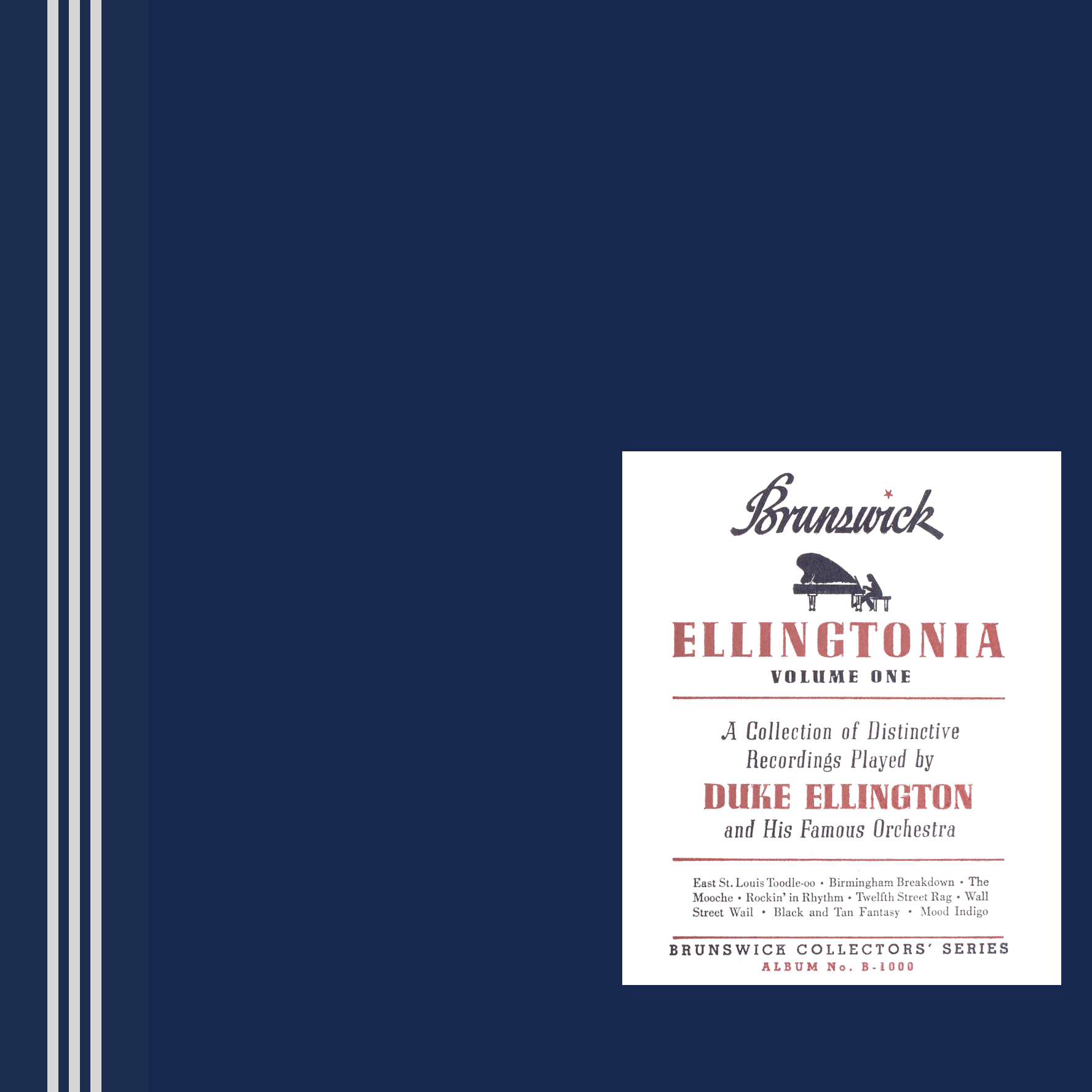

Compilation album by Duke Ellington
- Released: July 1943
- Recorded: 1927–1931
- Genre: Early swing, Ellingtonian jazz
- Label: Brunswick

Duke Ellington chronology
A Duke Ellington Panorama (1943)	Ellingtonia, Vol. One (1943)	Harlem Jazz, 1930 (1943)

Ellingtonia, Vol. One is a compilation album of phonograph records assembled by Brunswick Records during the American Federation of Musicians strike, cataloguing the early, experimental Brunswick and Vocalion recordings of Duke Ellington in the middle of the Harlem Renaissance. During the later Swing era, the recordings were praised for accurately predicting the developments in the Big band genre several years in advance.

== Reception ==
The first in the Brunswick series of reissues after Decca Records purchased their metal master records, the first volume of Ellingtonia was praised in Billboard magazine:

Decca is now developing these old sides in what should eventually prove a goldmine for the waxwork... For a starter, the collectors' series tees off with Ellingtonia (B-1000), a rich assemblage of Duke Ellington sides... from 1927 to 1931, back to the days when the late Bubber Miley's trumpeting made the hot jazz record fans sit up and shout the praises that have carried on thru the years.

The first two discs in the set were straight A-side/B-side reissues of the original recordings: Vocalion 1024 and Brunswick 6038. The new Brunswick reissue labels replaced group names originally accredited instead of or alongside Ellington, such as the/his "Kentucky Club Orchestra", "Washingtonians", "Cotton Club Orchestra", and the used-by-many pseudonym "The Jungle Band" with simply "Duke Ellington and His Orchestra".

According to Joel Whitburn, five of the set's eight songs charted when they were first released: "Mood Indigo" peaked at number 3 for one week, "East St. Louis Toodle-Oo" reached number 10, a different version of "Black and Tan Fantasy" hit number 15, "The Mooche" was a number 16 hit and lastly, "Rockin' in Rhythm" briefly appeared at number 19.

== Track listing ==
These previously issued songs, all Ellington compositions, were featured on a 4-disc, 78 rpm album set, Brunswick Album No. B-1000.

Disc 1: (80000)

1. "East St. Louis Toodle-Oo", recorded March 14, 1927.
2. "Birmingham Breakdown", recorded February 28, 1927.

Disc 2: (80001)

3. "Rockin' in Rhythm", recorded January 14, 1931.
4. "Twelfth Street Rag", recorded January 14, 1931.

Disc 3: (80002)

5. "Black and Tan Fantasy", recorded April 7, 1927.
6. "The Mooche", recorded October 17, 1928.

Disc 4: (80003)

7. "Mood Indigo", recorded October 17, 1930.
8. "Wall Street Wail", recorded December 10, 1929.
