= Any Major Dude Will Tell You =

Song by Steely Dan

from the album Pretzel Logic
- A-side: "Rikki Don't Lose That Number"
- Released: April 25, 1974
- Recorded: 1973
- Genre: Soft rock
- Length: 3:05
- Label: ABC
- Songwriters: Walter Becker, Donald Fagen
- Producer: Gary Katz

Official audio
- "Any Major Dude Will Tell You" on YouTube

"Any Major Dude Will Tell You" is a song written by Donald Fagen and Walter Becker that was first released by Steely Dan on their 1974 album Pretzel Logic. It was also released as the B-side of the first single from that album, "Rikki Don't Lose That Number", and on several of the band's compilation albums.

== Background and composition ==
Fagen said in a 2009 interview, "When we moved out to L.A., people called each other 'dude', which we found funny. We were trying to speak their language."

With most Steely Dan songs Becker and Fagen wrote both the music and the lyrics collaboratively, but "Any Major Dude Will Tell You" is a rare instance where Becker did not contribute musically, collaborating only on the lyrics.

== Lyrics and music ==
Steely Dan FAQ author Anthony Robustelli described "Any Major Dude Will Tell You" as "one of Steely Dan's smoothest-sounding songs and a good example of the California vibe of the '70s" The lyrics attempt to comfort the singer's friend who is going through a difficult time. The editors of Goldmine describe the refrain as beginning "with encouraging lyrics from one friend to another in a time of need, 'Any major dude with half a heart surely will tell you my friend, any minor world that breaks apart falls together again.'" Steely Dan biographer Brian Sweet describes this theme as one of "madness and insecurity." John Totten explains that the friend the singer is addressing has gone mad and is in distress for some undisclosed reason. AllMusic critic Stewart Mason feels that the song works particularly well because the "wise-ass" attitude taken by the singer "put sorrow in perspective without minimizing it."

One of the lines in the song refers to a "squonk's tears." The musicians did not know what a squonk was, and during the recording would ask each other in order to try to find out without revealing their ignorance to Fagen and Becker. A squonk is a mythical creature that when hunted could cry itself into a pool of tears when cornered. Totten believes that the singer is comparing himself to the squonk, and by doing so he humbles himself, giving the comforting message credibility and allowing him to express optimism that things will improve in the future with lines like "Any minor world that breaks apart falls together again".

The instrumentation includes Fagen's keyboards as well as multiple acoustic guitar parts. Fagen sings the lead vocal on the studio recording, but in live shows Royce Jones handled the lead vocal. Denny Dias has a guitar solo that was written by Becker and Jeff Baxter. Part of Dias' repeating guitar line required vibrato, but since Dias does not use vibrato in his playing he handed the guitar to Baxter to play the last five notes where vibrato was needed. Mason describes the music as "simple and utterly lovely."

== Reception ==
AllMusic critic Stephen Thomas Erlewine described "Any Major Dude Will Tell You" as "gorgeous." Stewart Mason described it as one of the group's "most underrated and appealing songs." The Brownsville Herald contributor Bobby Alvarez described it as "a good number" and particularly praised the vocals. Rolling Stone magazine critic Bid Scoppa described it as being at worst a "fine oddball pop [song]...which would make a terrific single." Something Else! critic Victor Aaron also felt that the song would have made a hit single, and noted that it did receive some radio airplay when it was released as the B-side of "Rikki Don't Lose That Number." The song was included on several Steely Dan compilation albums, including Greatest Hits in 1978, Citizen Steely Dan in 1993 and Showbiz Kids: The Steely Dan Story, 1972–1980 in 2000.

American alternative rock band Wilco covered the song for the 2000 movie Me, Myself & Irene. Santa Cruz Sentinel reporter Dave Ferman describes their cover as being loving and faithful. Tom Robinson inserted a verse from "Any Major Dude Will Tell You" into his cover of "Rikki Don't Lose That Number" on his 1984 album Hope and Glory.

== Personnel ==
Steely Dan

- Donald Fagen – vocals, electric piano
- Jeff Baxter – electric guitar
- Denny Dias – electric guitar

Additional musicians

- Dean Parks – acoustic guitar
- David Paich – electric piano
- Chuck Rainey – bass
- Jim Gordon – drums
