= Four Star Favorites =

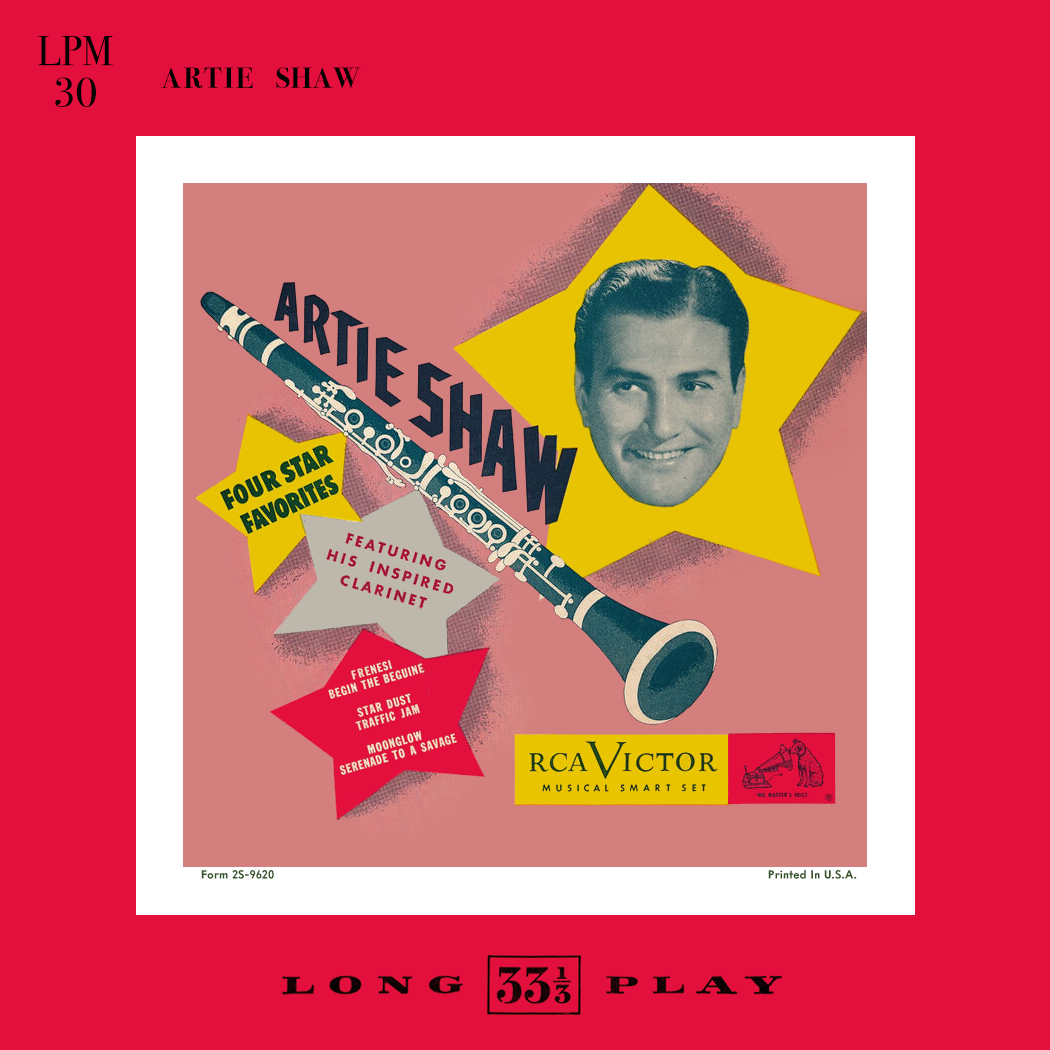
- LP reissue cover, 1951

Compilation album by Artie Shaw
- Released: September 5, 1941
- Recorded: 1938–1941
- Studio: Studio 2, Victor, New York; Victor Studios, Hollywood
- Genre: Dance band, orchestral jazz
- Length: 24:20
- Label: Victor

Artie Shaw chronology
An Album of Popular Music (1939)	Four Star Favorites (1941)	Up Swing (1944)

Four Star Favorites is a compilation album of phonograph records released in 1941 by Artie Shaw and His Orchestra on Victor Records, containing studio recordings by his second, third and fourth orchestras.

During the 1930s and 40s, Shaw's orchestras recorded two main styles of music inside of the jazz genre, danceable pop music following conventions of the time (swing) and a more sophisticated blend of classical music and jazz, aided with a string section (orchestral jazz or early third stream). These styles opposed each other, and during his career Shaw's attempts to make art music oftentimes failed because it was not commercially viable.

Bridging the divide in Shaw's catalog, the compilation appealed to audiences of both swing music and more progressive forms of jazz. Well-reviewed upon release, the album stayed in-print for over a decade.

== Background and reception ==
"Frenesí" – 1940 Victor studio recording
With an arrangement by William Grant Still, the intro to "Frenesí" highlights Artie Shaw's string section.

Acknowledged as the most cerebral of the dance bandleaders, throughout his career, Artie Shaw had an uneasy relationship with popularity. Preferring to record songs for perceived artistic value rather than cater to popular demand, in 1938, his second band (after "Art Shaw and His New Music" in the middle 30s) struck massive success with "Begin the Beguine", a number-one hit for six weeks; From then on, the Shaw outfits were some of the most popular of the swing era. However, critics speculated Shaw never wanted the massive amount of success he received. Frustrated with the way his black musicians such as Billie Holiday were treated, the commercial nature of playing hit songs repetitively, and the music business in general, Shaw disbanded his orchestra in November 1939 and took 2 months off in a brief move to Acapulco, Mexico.

In Acapulco, Shaw first heard the then-new Alberto Domínguez composition "Frenesí". Reforming his band in early 1940 with the addition of a string section, Shaw recorded the song in March, which first appeared on Billboard charts on August 3. In late December, the single jumped from the 7th position to the top of the chart, holding its place for thirteen weeks and proving to be one of the largest hit singles of the 1940s decade. However, by the time the record hit number 1, Shaw had already progressed to his fourth band with largely different personnel. The sides included were representative of all three: tracks 2, 4, 6 and 8 were from Shaw's first successful orchestra and second overall; track 1 Shaw's third; and tracks 3, 5 and 7 his fourth.

Four Star Favorites was well received in music publications. The New Yorker designated it a "perfectly swell album... which includes several of the band's best accomplishments." Radio and Television Mirror briefly recommended it, and while Variety was positive, they noted the potential of fans to disagree with Victor's selections, due to the contrast between Shaw's more orchestral leanings and popular, danceable swing material. The American Music Lover, a publication mainly devoted to classical music, assigned the album four "A"s, their highest rating:

Don't look at the album and think it's re-hash of old stuff... Admit instead that it was a clever stunt on Victor's part to recouple eight sides of Artie's best contributions made during various stages of that mind-changing-about-musicians career of his... Artie, as a musician, shines in each piece... they're all well done.

Professional ratings
Review scores
Source	Rating
The American Music Lover	A A A A
The New Yorker	(favorable)
Variety	(favorable)
Radio and Television Mirror	(recommended)

== Track listing ==
These reissued songs were featured on a 4-disc, 78 rpm album set, Victor P-85.

Disc 1: (27546)

1. "Frenesí", recorded March 3, 1940.
2. "Begin the Beguine", recorded July 24, 1938.

Disc 2: (27547)

3. "Star Dust", recorded October 7, 1940.
4. "Back Bay Shuffle", recorded July 24, 1938.

Disc 3: (27548)

5. "Dancing in the Dark", recorded January 23, 1941.
6. "Traffic Jam", recorded June 12, 1939.

Disc 4: (27549)

7. "Moonglow", recorded January 23, 1941.
8. "Serenade To a Savage", recorded June 22, 1939.

== Release history ==
The original album was issued on four ten-inch 78 rpm records, September 5th, 1941 on Victor Records. Imprints of the album produced after February–March 1946 feature RCA Victor on the cover and labels. In 1949, truncated as six songs, the album was reissued on 45 rpm, WP 85. In 1950, after the format war between vinyl discs subsided, RCA Victor reached a cross-liscening agreement with Columbia to issue their records on LP. The following year, the label reissued the six-track album on a 10" LP, LPM-30.

1949 EP track listing
No.	Title	Writer(s)	Recording date	Length
1.	"Frenesí"	Alberto Domínguez	March 3, 1940	3:01
2.	"Begin the Beguine"	Cole Porter	July 24, 1938	3:14
3.	"Star Dust"	Hoagy Carmichael	October 7, 1940	3:31
4.	"Traffic Jam"	Teddy McRae–Artie Shaw	June 12, 1939	2:13
5.	"Moonglow"	Will Hudson	January 23, 1941	3:33
6.	"Serenade To a Savage"	Joe Garland–Edgar Battle	June 22, 1939	2:33
Total length:				18:05

1951 LP track listing
No.	Title	Writer(s)	Recording date	Length
1.	"Frenesí"	Alberto Domínguez	March 3, 1940	3:01
2.	"Star Dust"	Hoagy Carmichael	October 7, 1940	3:31
3.	"Moonglow"	Will Hudson	January 23, 1941	3:33
4.	"Serenade To a Savage"	Joe Garland–Edgar Battle	June 22, 1939	2:33
5.	"Traffic Jam"	Teddy McRae–Artie Shaw	June 12, 1939	2:13
6.	"Begin the Beguine"	Cole Porter	July 24, 1938	3:14
Total length:				18:05

== Chart performance ==
While Four Star Favorites saw release nearly 3 1/2 years before the first Billboard magazine Best Selling Popular Albums chart appeared, the continued public interest in Shaw's recordings (and those of the swing era in general) kept the album in print for over 10 years. As such, it did chart, peaking at number 4 on July 28, 1945. The 1949 EP configuration also charted, debuting in late 1951 and reappearing at number 8 in early 1952.

Six out of the album's eight tracks charted upon their original release. "Beguine" and "Frenesí" were both number-one hits, as well as the only selections in the album to chart outside the United States. The four other songs all reached the Top 10 in the US.

Sales chart performance for singles from Four Star Favorites
Release date	Single	Peak position (Note: Exponents represent number of weeks at the number ① position.)		
Release date	Single	US	UK	AUS
August 17, 1938	"Begin the Beguine"	①^{6}	–	6
August 24, 1938	"Back Bay Shuffle"	8	–	–
August 21, 1939	"Traffic Jam"	9	–	–
March 29, 1940	"Frenesí"	①^{13}	8	–
December 6, 1940	"Star Dust"	6	–	–
February 14, 1941	"Dancing in the Dark"	9	–	–

Sales chart performance for Four Star Favorites
Peak date	Chart	Peak position
Peak date	Chart	US
July 28, 1945	Billboard Best-Selling Popular Record Albums	4
January 19, 1952	Billboard Best Selling 45 r.p.m.	8

== Personnel ==
Track numbers reference the 78 rpm album configuration. Complete personnel per the Glenn Miller Archive, University of Colorado Boulder.

Woodwinds

- Artie Shaw – clarinet, leader
- Joe Krechter – bass clarinet (1)
- Bud Carlton – alto saxophone (1)
- Blake Reynolds – alto saxophone (1)
- Les Robinson – alto saxophone (2–8)
- Hank Freeman – alto saxophone, baritone saxophone (2, 4, 6, 8)
- Neely Plumb – alto saxophone (3, 5, 7)
- Jack Stacy – tenor saxophone (1)
- Dick Clark – tenor saxophone (1)
- Ronnie Perry – tenor saxophone (2, 4)
- Tony Pastor – tenor saxophone (2, 4, 6, 8)
- Jerry Jerome – tenor saxophone (3, 5, 7)
- Bus Bassey – tenor saxophone (3, 5, 7)
- Phil Nemoli – oboe (1)
- Mort Ruderman – flute (1)

Brass

- Mannie Klein – trumpet (1)
- Charles Margolis – trumpet (1)
- George Thow – trumpet (1)
- Claude Bowen – trumpet (2, 4)
- Chuck Peterson – trumpet (2, 4, 6, 8)
- Johnny Best – trumpet (2, 4, 6, 8)
- Jack Cathcart – trumpet (3)
- Billy Butterfield – trumpet (3, 5, 7)
- George Wendt – trumpet (3, 5, 7)
- Clyde Hurley – trumpet (5, 7)
- Bernie Privin – trumpet (6, 8)
- John Cave – flugelhorn (1)
- Bill Rank – trombone (1)
- Babe Bowman – trombone (1)
- Randall Miller – trombone (1)
- Ted Vesely – trombone (2, 4)
- George Arus – trombone (2, 4, 6, 8)
- Harry Rodgers – trombone (2, 4, 6, 8)
- Vernon Brown – trombone (3, 5, 7)
- Jack Jenney – trombone (3, 5, 7)
- Ray Conniff – trombone (5, 7)
- Les Jenkins – trombone (6, 8)

Strings

- Harry Bluestone – violin (1)
- Robert Barene – violin (1)
- Sid Brokaw – violin (1)
- Dave Cracov – violin (1)
- Peter Eisenberg – violin (1)
- Jerry Joyce – violin (1)
- Alex Law – violin (1)
- Mark Levant – violin (1)
- Alex Beller – violin (3, 5, 7)
- Truman Boardman – violin (3, 5, 7)
- Bill Brower – violin (3, 5, 7)
- Ted Klages – violin (3, 5, 7)
- Eugene Lamas – violin (3, 5, 7)
- Bob Morrow – violin (3, 5, 7)
- Jack Ray – viola (1)
- Stan Spiegelman – viola (1)
- Dave Sturkin – viola (1)
- Keith Collins – viola (3, 5, 7)
- Allan Harshman – viola (3, 5, 7)
- Irv Lipschultz – cello (1)
- Jules Tannenbaum – cello (1)
- Fred Goemer – cello (3, 5, 7)

Rhythm

- Stan Wrightsman – piano (1)
- Les Burness – piano (2, 4)
- Johnny Guarnieri – piano (3, 5, 7)
- Bob Kitsis – piano (6, 8)
- Bobby Sherwood – guitar (1)
- Al Avola – guitar (2, 4, 6, 8)
- Al Hendrickson – guitar (3, 5, 7)
- Jud DeNaut – bass (1, 3, 5, 7)
- Sid Weiss – bass (2, 4, 6, 8)
- Carl Maus – drums (1)
- Cliff "Mr. Time" Leeman – drums (2, 4)
- Nick Fatool – drums (3, 5, 7)
- Buddy Rich – drums (6, 8)

Arrangers

- Artie Shaw
- William Grant Still (1)
- Jerry Gray (2)
- John Bartee (4, possibly)
- Lennie Hayton (5, 7)
- Teddy McRae (6, possibly)
