= Up Swing =

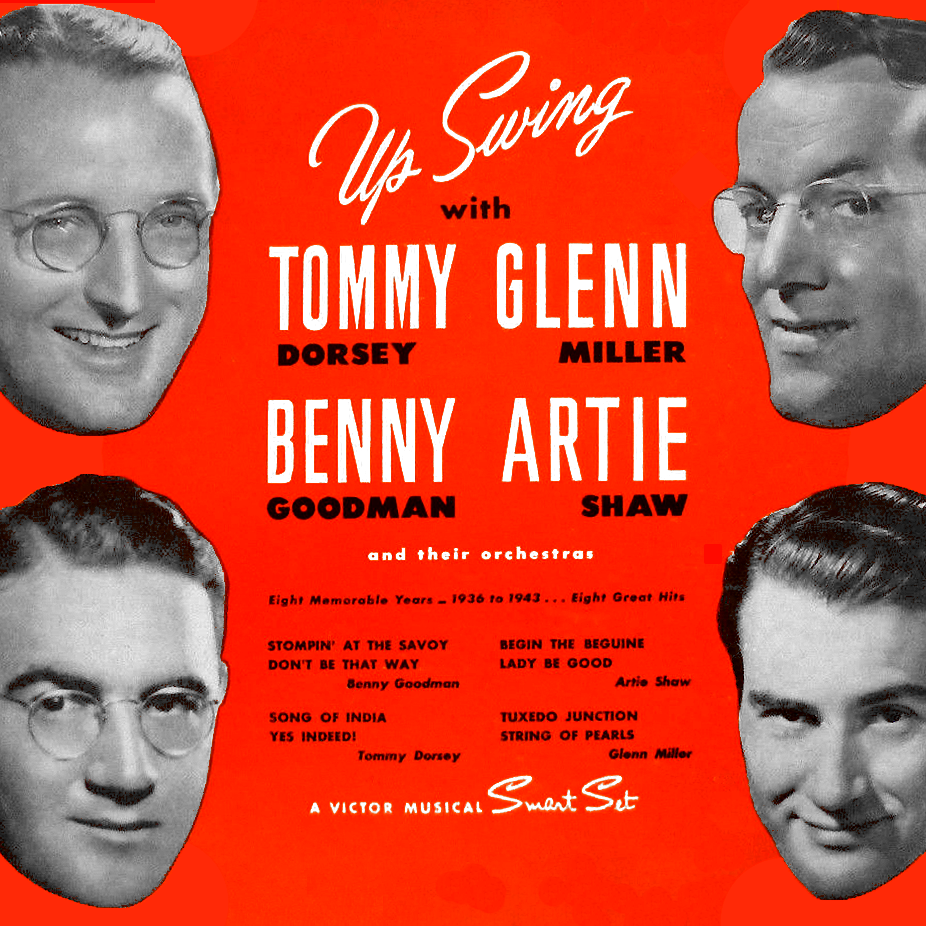

Compilation album by Various
- Released: February 17, 1944
- Recorded: 1936–1941
- Genres: Dance band, swing, jazz
- Label: Victor

Glenn Miller chronology
Chicago Jazz Classics (1943)	Up Swing (1944)	Smoke; Rings (1944)

Benny Goodman chronology
Chicago Jazz Classics (1943)	Up Swing (1944)	Smoke; Rings (1944)

Tommy Dorsey chronology
Getting Sentimental with Tommy Dorsey (1941)	Up Swing (1944)	Smoke; Rings (1944)

Artie Shaw chronology
Four Star Favorites (1941)	Up Swing (1944)	Smoke; Rings (1944)

Up Swing is a compilation album of phonograph records released by bandleaders Tommy Dorsey, Glenn Miller, Benny Goodman, and Artie Shaw in 1944 as a part of the Victor Musical Smart Set series. The set, a progenitor to greatest hits releases, features some of the most popular Dance Band Era recordings by the four bandleaders.

== Reception ==
Released in the middle of the 1942-44 recording ban, the album reached number four on the August 4, 1945 Billboard Best-Selling Popular Record Albums chart, which would soon become the standard. A February 1944 issue of Billboard Magazine highlighted Miller's disc specifically: "Re-issue of this swell tune is one of eight sides comprising Victor's new album, "Up Swing." A close race, but this disk wins. Miller fans, new and old, should eat it up." However, Swing Magazine's Bob Kennedy preferred Shaw's disk and declared the album "an absolute must for collectors."

== Track listing ==
These reissued songs were featured on a 4-disc, 78 rpm album set, Victor P-146.

Disc 1: (20-1549)

1. "Stompin' At The Savoy", recorded January 24, 1936 with Benny Goodman and His Orchestra.
2. "Don't Be That Way", recorded February 16, 1938 with Benny Goodman and His Orchestra.

Disc 2: (20-1550)

3. "Song of India", recorded February 5, 1937 with Tommy Dorsey and His Orchestra. Arranged by Tommy Dorsey and E.W. "Red" Bone.
4. "Yes Indeed!", recorded February 17, 1941 with Tommy Dorsey and His Orchestra.

Disc 3: (20-1551)

5. "Begin the Beguine", recorded July 24, 1938 with Artie Shaw and His Orchestra. Arranged by Jerry Gray.
6. "Oh, Lady Be Good", recorded August 27, 1939 with Artie Shaw and His Orchestra. Arranged by Jerry Gray.

Disc 4: (20-1552)

7. "Tuxedo Junction", recorded February 5, 1940 with Glenn Miller and His Orchestra. Written by Erskine Hawkins, Bill Johnson, Julian Dash and Buddy Feyne. Arranged by Jerry Gray.
8. "A String of Pearls", recorded November 3, 1941 with Glenn Miller and His Orchestra. Arranged by Jerry Gray.

== LP track listing ==
In 1951, RCA Victor reissued the set on 10-inch LP as RCA Victor LPT-12.

Side one
No.	Title	Artist	Length
1.	"Stompin' at The Savoy"	Benny Goodman and His Orchestra	3:14
2.	"Song of India"	Tommy Dorsey and His Orchestra	3:05
3.	"Begin the Beguine"	Artie Shaw and His Orchestra	3:13
4.	"Tuxedo Junction"	Glenn Miller and His Orchestra	3:26

Side two
No.	Title	Artist	Length
5.	"A String of Pearls"	Glenn Miller and His Orchestra	3:13
6.	"Oh, Lady Be Good"	Artie Shaw and His Orchestra	3:07
7.	"Yes Indeed!"	Tommy Dorsey and His Orchestra	3:29
8.	"Don't Be That Way"	Benny Goodman and His Orchestra	3:21
