= Roger Nichols (sound engineer) =

American recording engineer, producer, and inventor (1944–2011)

Roger S. Nichols
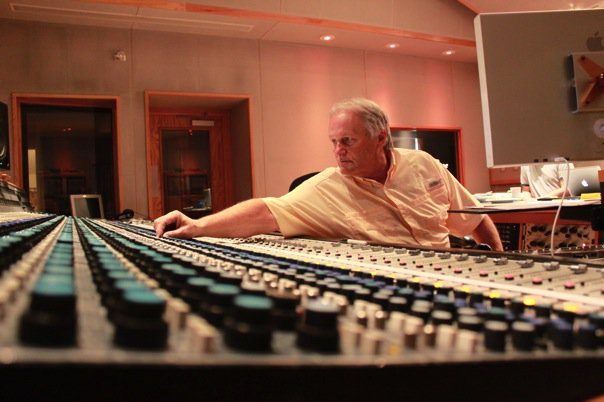

Background information
- Also known as: "The Immortal"
- Born: Roger S. Nichols; September 22, 1944; Oakland, California, U.S.
- Died: April 9, 2011 (aged 66) Burbank, California, U.S.
- Genres: Rock, folk, jazz, country, multiple others
- Occupations: Recording engineer, record producer, inventor
- Years active: 1963–2011
- Website: www.rogernichols.com

Roger Scott Nichols (September 22, 1944 – April 9, 2011) was an American recording engineer, producer, and inventor.

Nichols is best known for his work with the group Steely Dan and John Denver. He was also the audio engineer for numerous major music acts including the Beach Boys, Stevie Wonder, Frank Zappa, Crosby Stills & Nash, Al Di Meola, Rosanne Cash, Roy Orbison, Cass Elliot, Plácido Domingo, Gloria Estefan, Diana Ross, Béla Fleck and the Flecktones, Rickie Lee Jones, Kenny Loggins, Mark Knopfler, Eddie Murphy, Michael McDonald, James Taylor, and Toots Thielemans, among others. On February 11, 2012, Nichols was awarded a Special Merit/Technical Grammy Award, his eighth Grammy overall.

In May 2010 Nichols was diagnosed with stage IV pancreatic cancer. He died from the disease at his home on April 9, 2011. In his subsequent New York Times obituary, Nichols was referred to in the headline as an "Artist Among Sound Engineers."

The Roger Nichols Recording Method, his guide to audio engineering, was released by Alfred Music Publishing on June 17, 2013.

== Early life, family and education ==
Roger Nichols was born in Oakland, California. His father was a U.S. Air Force B-47 pilot. As a result, the Nichols family lived in various spots in the US for the first eleven years of Roger's life. In 1957, the family settled in Cucamonga, California, where Nichols attended high school. One of his classmates was Frank Zappa; Zappa would drop by Nichols' house to "play guitar, and we would do multiple passes of guitars and bounce them together" on Nichols' first recording device, a reel-to-reel tape deck using quarter-inch tape.

Nichols attended Oregon State University where he studied nuclear physics.

== From nuclear operator to recording engineer ==
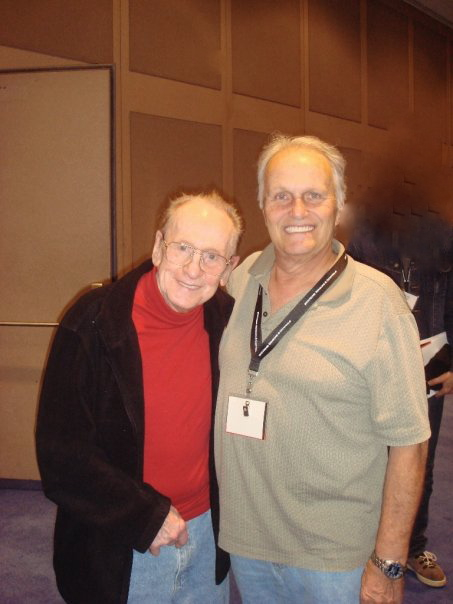
Nichols and electric guitar & multitrack recording inventor Les Paul

From 1965 to 1968, Nichols was a nuclear operator at the San Onofre Nuclear Generating Station (SONGS).

Nichols and some friends created their own recording studio, Quantum Studios, in Torrance, California, in 1965. The facility originally was a four-car garage; it was converted into a four-track studio to record high school bands. A hi-fi supply store, created as a side business by Nichols and his partners, brought in clients and contacts that led to recording commercials. Future stars Karen Carpenter and Larry Carlton performing on some of the spots. Another musician Nichols recorded in this era was the former Mouseketeer Cubby O'Brien, on the drums. Nichols also recorded Kenny Rogers, then with the First Edition; the studio was expanded into a former post office and upgraded to 16 tracks.

Sales of recording equipment and machinery to ABC Records' first recording studio led to a contact with Phil Kaye, who was in charge of the facility. Nichols was hired in 1970 to maintain the equipment and do engineering work with Kaye and Steve Barri. Some of the clients Nichols recorded at this time included John Phillips and Denny Doherty of the Mamas and the Papas, the Grass Roots, and Hamilton, Joe Frank and Reynolds.

== The Steely Dan years ==
=== First meeting ===
In 1971 Nichols met Gary Katz, newly hired at the ABC Dunhill label as a record producer. Walter Becker and Donald Fagen were also working at ABC as song writers; one night Nichols was drafted, when no one else on the staff wanted to be involved, to stay and engineer a demo session that Becker and Fagen were holding to record their tunes for use by other artists. Nichols discovered he had a great deal in common with the then-unknown duo, including sharing a taste for impeccable audio quality. Nichols was asked to engineer their first record album in 1972, and he would wind up working with Katz, Becker and Fagen in recording the first, decade-long incarnation of the band that became known as Steely Dan.

Nichols once ascribed his close professional connection with Steely Dan and Mr. Katz to the obsession they all had with getting the most out of the technology in the recording studio. "We're all perfectionists" Mr. Nichols said. "It wasn't a drag for me to do things over and over until it was perfect." He added: "It would have driven a lot of other engineers up the wall. In my own way, I'm just as crazy as they are."

— Conclusion of Roger Nichols' New York Times obituary by noted music writer Ben Sisario.

=== Engineering the birth of Steely Dan ===
As a result of working with Nichols, Becker and Fagen and producer Katz were determined to have him seated behind the recording console for the 1972 start of studio sessions their first album, Can't Buy a Thrill. This conflicted with Nichols' summer vacation, and the decision was made to postpone recording until Nichols returned, much to ABC president Jay Lasker's annoyance, due to the amount of money advanced to the fledgling band. Once begun, the process was exacting. Nichols later commented:

We finished it in six months, which was quick for them. But even then their acceptance level was way above everyone else's. They never had the attitude of 'It's getting late that's good enough', or 'No-one else will notice'. Everything had to be as near perfect as technically and humanly possible.

The album sold well and yielded two hit singles, ensuring Nichols would be tied to the band's fortunes. Nichols was involved in engineering every Steely Dan album.

=== Nickname: "The Immortal" ===
Interviewed in 1993 for 'Metal Leg, the Steely Dan Magazine', Nichols stated (regarding his nickname that appears on many of his credits):

... they were trying to kill me. I was working on a Johnny Winter session on the weekends, with Steve Barri all day and with Steely Dan all night, so they had me going 24 hours a day. They tried running me into the ground, but it didn't work. Then there was the time when we were working at Cherokee Studios when two of the tape machines were grounded improperly and I touched both of the machines and everything shorted out. The face plate on one of the machines was completely melted but I didn't feel a thing. They figured something weird was going on.

=== Innovations for 'Countdown to Ecstasy' and 'The Hand' ===
When Becker and Fagen expressed frustration during the band's second album Countdown to Ecstasy with the difficulty in acquiring a steady drum tempo, Nichols was forced to improvise. The track "Show Biz Kids" had proved especially challenging in regards to a steady beat. As quoted in Brian Sweet's biography of Steely Dan, Reelin' in the Years, Nichols recalled:

It was just one of those tunes that that was so very difficult to play exactly in tempo, with every instrument in sync. ... There were no drum machines in those days, so we made a 24 track, eight bar tape loop, which at 30 ips was a considerable length of tape, trailed it out through the door into the studio, around a little idler which was set up on a camera tripod, back into the studio and then copied that to a second 24 track machine. Everything was on tape except the lead vocal and the lead guitar. It worked like a dream.

The album's back cover photograph featured a photo of Steely Dan in the recording studio control room, and included Nichols' seemingly disembodied hand on the mixing console while he hid beneath it.

=== Steely Dan's studio-only years ===
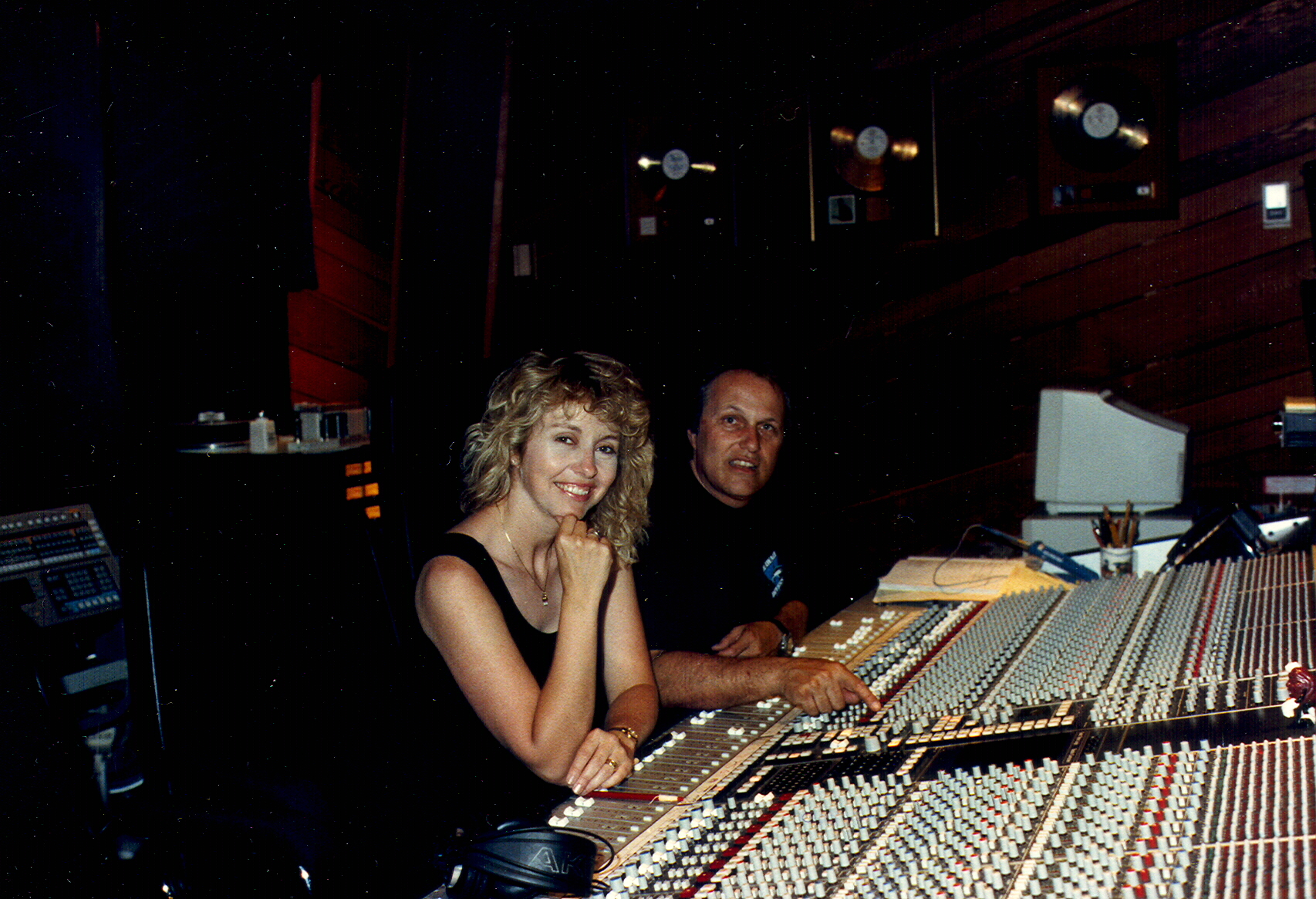
Nichols and Connie Reeder (his wife) in 1988

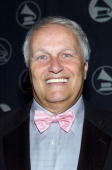
After winning the NARAS Lifetime Achievement Award in 2005

After the third Steely Dan album Pretzel Logic and the tour by the band in support of it, Steely Dan ceased touring and turned into a band that only performed on recordings. Nichols' duties became more diverse, and ranged from diagnosing a flaw on the master tape of the band's biggest selling single, "Rikki Don't Lose That Number," (a workman's gob of mustard on the tape was found by Nichols to be to blame), to helping to recover the sound on their fourth album, Katy Lied, which had been recorded at ABC Recording Studios and had suffered when the master tape was processed through a faulty dbx noise reduction system while mixing.

=== Grammy Awards with Steely Dan ===
Nichols would win his initial three Grammy Awards (Best Engineered Recording — Non-Classical) for his late 1970s-early 80s "meticulous studio work" with Steely Dan on the 1977 album Aja, which was his first Grammy, the hit single "FM (No Static at All)" and then for his engineering contributions to the 1980 release Gaucho. Nichols won three additional Grammys with Steely Dan, including the notable achievement 'Album Of The Year' for his sonic accomplishments on their comeback album, Two Against Nature (2000).

=== Firing by Steely Dan ===
Steely Dan biographer Brian Sweet disclosed in 2018 that Nichols had been fired in early 2002 when recording sessions for Everything Must Go at New York City's River Sound resumed, having been suspended after the 9-11 attacks, without Nichols' participation or knowledge. Sweet's updated revision of his book Reelin' in the Years stated he was "... cut off without any notification or justification. Nichols was devastated to be treated in such a manner by his friends and after 30 years of working together."

== Inventions ==
In 1978, Nichols pioneered the technique of "digital drum replacement" by inventing the Wendel sampling computer, which was used to provide some of the drum and percussion sounds on Steely Dan's album, Gaucho, notably the song "Hey Nineteen." This technology is now commonplace in music production around the world. He invented and produced a rubidium nuclear clock under his company name Digital Atomics. The purpose of the clock was to provide the accuracy of nuclear timekeeping to better synchronize digital recording equipment in the studio, but at a lower cost than the typical cesium clocks such as those used in military and aviation applications.

== As author ==
Nichols was a pro audio columnist and gear reviewer for many years at EQ, a professional audio magazine. He also wrote prose extensively, including material for master classroom use, which he intended to turn into a textbook on recording technique. He did not live to see the final publication of his works, the first of which, The Roger Nichols Recording Method, has been compiled and edited by his wife Conrad Reeder and Mike Lawson for Alfred Music Publishing, under the oversight of its CEO Ron Manus who years earlier had been Nichols' tape op in the studio. In early 2013, Manus stated, "We are so thrilled to have the opportunity to publish Roger's work. I can think of no better way to honor his memory and legacy than by making his unparalleled experience and knowledge available to the world." Reeder envisioned that "a new generation will benefit from Roger's artistry and inventive brilliance in the recording studio by releasing" the book.

== Other activities ==
Nichols lectured before numerous audiences, including as a guest lecturer for the Berklee School of Music, University of Miami, and Recording Workshop.

Nichols was also a scuba diving instructor, an avid photographer, and an airplane pilot. He was close friends and flying buddies with singer/songwriter John Denver. Nichols engineered and produced albums for Denver over a nearly 20-year period, including the 1998 children's railroad train album All Aboard! which earned Denver his first Grammy Award (awarded posthumously). Nichols was on his way to California to fly with Denver in his new experimental Long-EZ plane when he learned of the crash in which Denver was killed.

== Personal life ==
Nichols was married to writer/musician Conrad Reeder with whom he had two daughters, Cimcie and Ashlee.

Nichols was diagnosed with stage 4 pancreatic cancer on May 29, 2010. In early 2011 he was reported to be "fighting for his life." Nichols died on April 9, 2011, aged 66.

== Grammy Awards ==
- 1977 "Best Engineer Non-Classical" Steely Dan Aja
- 1978 "Best Engineer Non-Classical" Steely Dan FM (soundtrack)
- 1981 "Best Engineer Non Classical" Steely Dan Gaucho
- 1997 Producer "Best Children's Album" John Denver All Aboard!
- 2000 "Best Pop Vocal Album" Steely Dan Two Against Nature
- 2000 "Album of the Year" Steely Dan Two Against Nature
- 2000 "Best Engineer Non-Classical" Steely Dan Two Against Nature
- 2012 Special Merit/Technical Grammy Award for "contributions of outstanding technical significance to the recording field."

In 2006 Nichols' work was formally recognized by The Recording Academy (Grammys) Producers and Engineers Wing.
