= Harlem Jazz, 1930 =

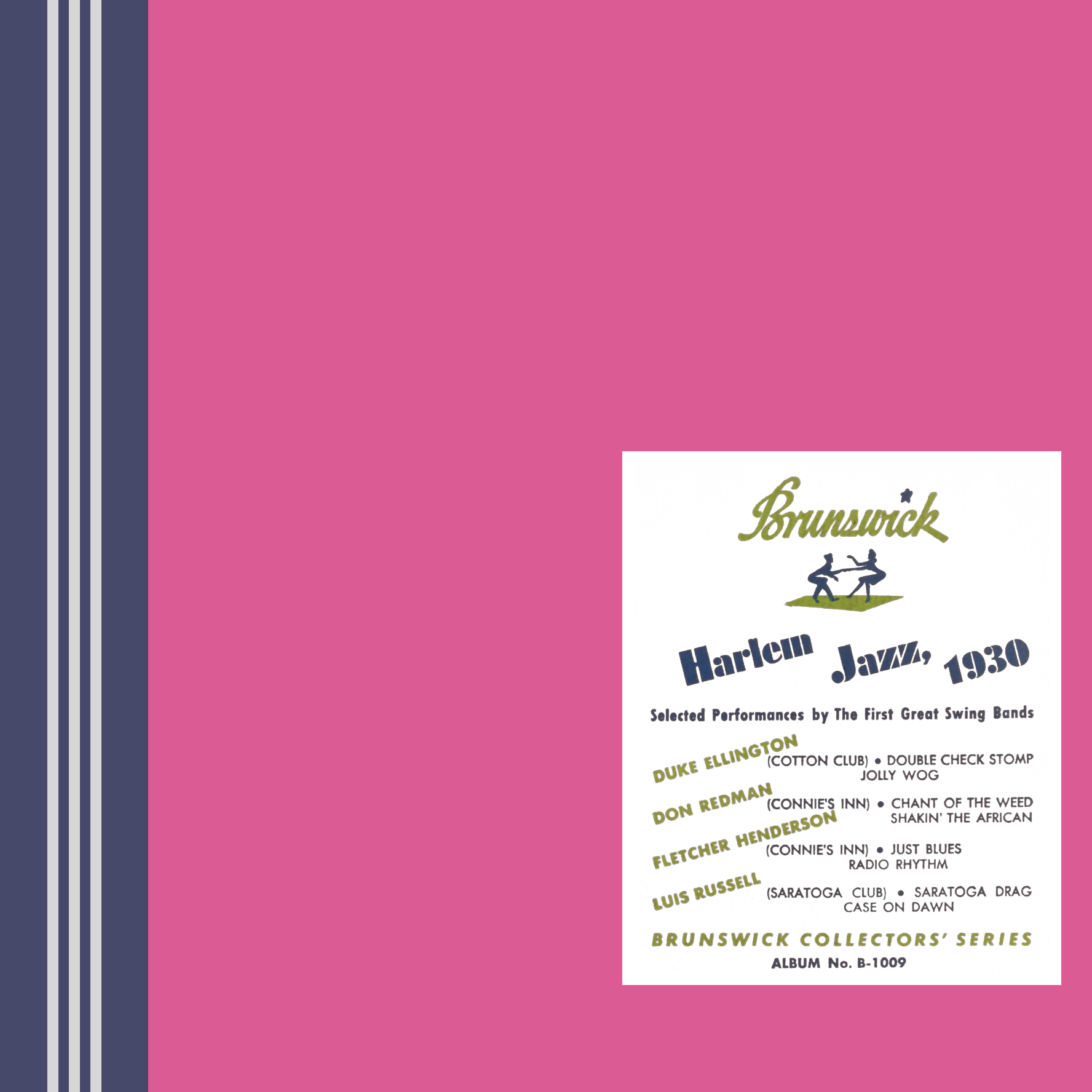

Compilation album by Various
- Released: mid-October 1943
- Recorded: 1929–1931
- Genre: Early swing, Ellingtonian jazz
- Label: Brunswick

Duke Ellington chronology
Ellingtonia, Vol. One (1943)	Harlem Jazz, 1930 (1943)	Smoke; Rings (1944)

Don Redman chronology
Harlem Jazz, 1930 (1943)	A Study in Frustration (1961)

Fletcher Henderson chronology
Gems of Jazz; Vol. 4 (1942)	Harlem Jazz, 1930 (1943)	Asch Records Presents (1945)

Luis Russell chronology
Harlem Jazz, 1930 (1943)	New Orleans Jazz (1946)

Harlem Jazz, 1930 is a compilation album of phonograph records assembled by Brunswick Records during the American Federation of Musicians strike, cataloguing the effect of the Harlem Renaissance on what was known as Dixieland, or "hot" jazz in New York City. The album features venues the orchestras played at the time of the recordings, such as Connie's Inn or The Cotton Club.

== Reception ==
Harlem Jazz, 1930 was welcomed in Billboard:

The spontaneous jazz of the early and turbulent '30s, in the speakeasy era when the New York Harlem sector jumped and Duke Ellington reigned supreme and most rhythmically at the Cotton Club, this package of eight sides represents still another chapter in the history of jazz... the selected sides bring back the memories of the reckless abandon in rhythm that characterized the playing of Don Redman at Connie's Inn, represented here in the Chant of the Weed theme and Shakin' the African, and stemming from the same Harlem hottery, Fletcher Henderson for Radio Rhythm and Just Blues. Completing the session is Luis Russell, then at the Saratoga Club, for Saratoga Swing and Case on Dawn.

According to Joel Whitburn, the only charting song of the set was Redman's "Chant of the Weed", which peaked at number 15 in December 1931.

== Track listing ==
These previously issued songs were featured on a 4-disc, 78 rpm album set, Brunswick Album No. B-1009.

Disc 1: (80035)

1. "Double Check Stomp", recorded April 22, 1930, with Duke Ellington and His Orchestra.
2. "Jolly Wog", recorded September 13, 1929, with Duke Ellington and His Orchestra.

Disc 2: (80036)

3. "Chant of the Weed", recorded September 24, 1931, with Don Redman and His Orchestra.
4. "Shakin' the African", recorded October 15, 1931, with Don Redman and His Orchestra.

Disc 3: (80037)

5. "Just Blues", recorded April 24, 1931, with Fletcher Henderson and His Orchestra.
6. "Radio Rhythm", recorded July 17, 1931, with Fletcher Henderson and His Orchestra.

Disc 4: (80038)

7. "Saratoga Drag", recorded December 17, 1930, with Luis Russell and His Orchestra.
8. "Case On Dawn", recorded December 17, 1930, with Luis Russell and His Orchestra.
