= Conrad Reeder =

American singer-songwriter

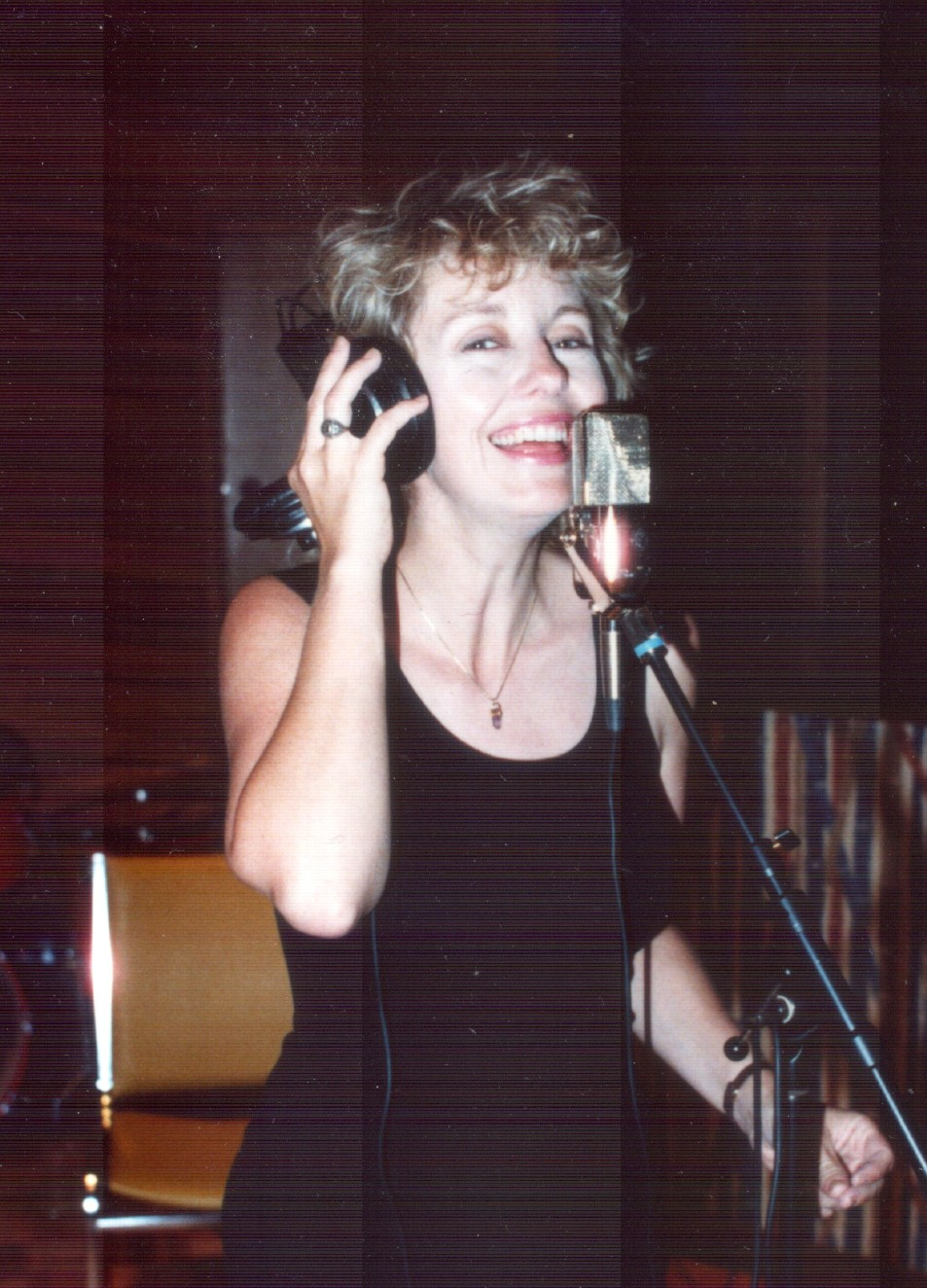
- Reeder in 1988

Background information
- Also known as: Fugitive Blonde
- Born: Connie S. Reeder; 1954 (age 71–72); Columbus, Ohio, US
- Genres: Rock, folk, pop, others
- Occupations: Recording artist, singer, songwriter, playwright, professor
- Years active: 1974–present
- Formerly of: Big Blonde, Fugitive Blonde, John Denver's band
- Spouse: Roger Nichols

Conrad Reeder (born 1954), also known as Connie Reeder Nichols, is an American singer, songwriter, writer and college professor.

== Early life, family and education ==
Reeder was born in Columbus, Ohio, US.

Reeder graduated in 2008 from the University of New Orleans with a Master of Fine Arts degree in Creative Writing/Playwrighting. Her thesis, Jack is ~~Dead~~, was inspired by her friend and fellow musician John Denver's death by plane crash. Reeder was a doctoral candidate at Pacifica Graduate Institute in Santa Barbara, California.

== Career ==
=== Music ===
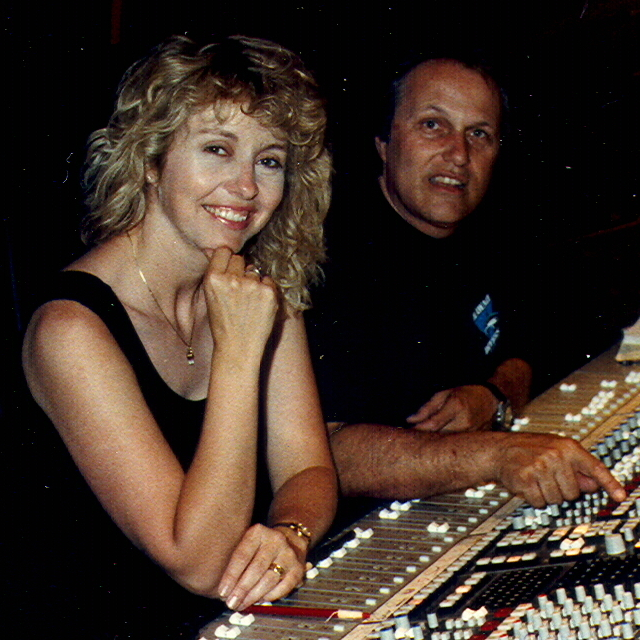
With husband Roger Nichols in the studio in 1988

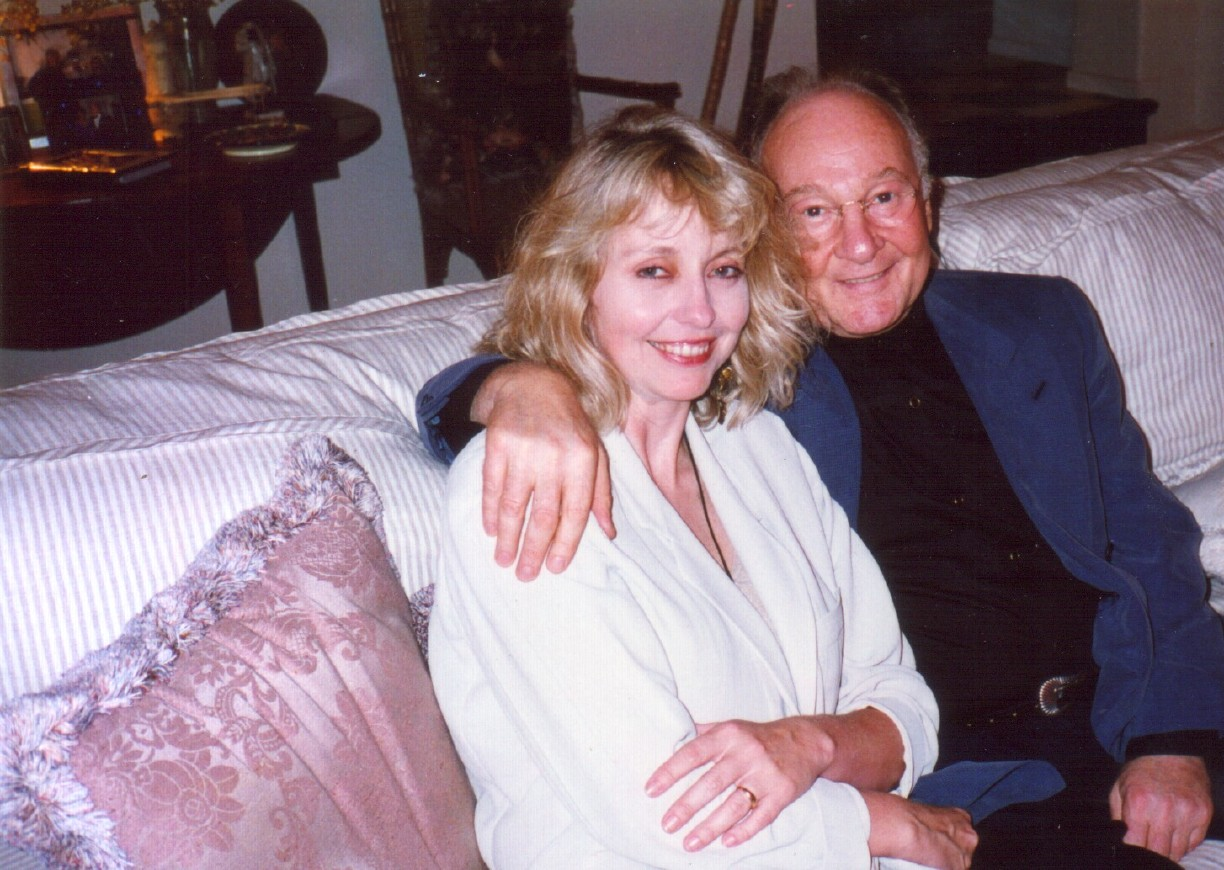
With Paul A. Rothchild in 1994

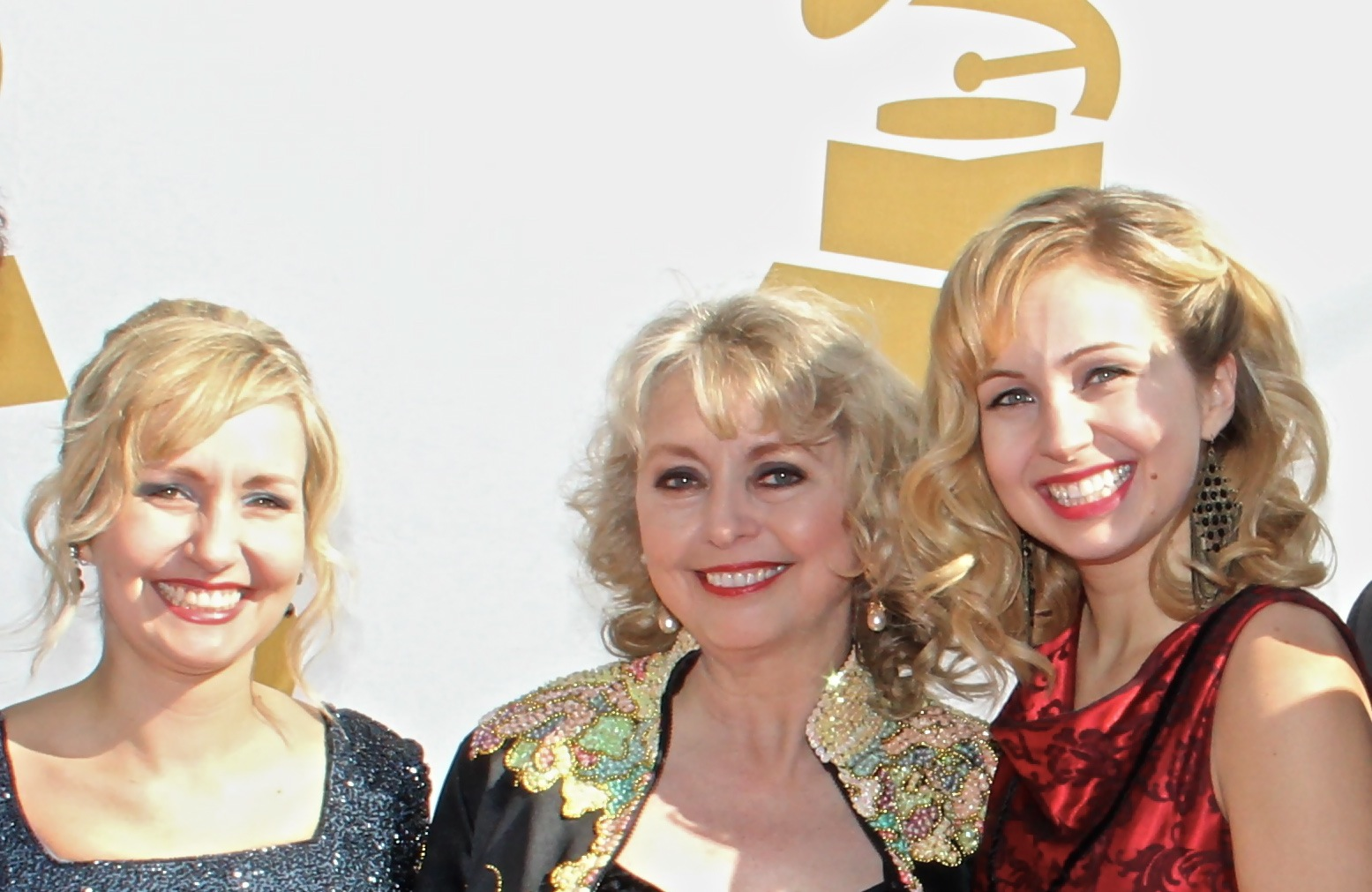
Reeder with daughters Cimcie and Ashlee Nichols at the 54th Grammy Awards in 2012 to accept her husband's Special Merit/Technical Grammy Award.

Reeder sang for fifteen years with John Denver in live concerts, on television and recordings including Dreamland Express and It's About Time. She sang live duets with Denver as well as performing as a background singer. She co-wrote the Denver song "Thanks to You." She remained in contact with Denver's mother after he died in a plane crash.

Reeder is credited as a writer or co-writer on all tracks of her husband's release, The Roger Nichols Project. She was signed to Motown's Morocco Records in the early 1980s, but the label folded before her first album was released. Reeder led her own band Fugitive Blonde in Nashville, Tennessee during the 1980s and 1990s; an earlier Los Angeles version was Big Blonde.

=== Writing ===
Reeder was a featured columnist and article writer at EQ magazine in the 1990s, writing as C. Reeder. The column, The Demo Queen, often lampooned the trials involved in the process of recording demo tapes in quest of a record deal. Her writing has sometimes taken a serious view of life and love, including in her book, Memory Clouds: Good Grief Bad Grief. An e-book she wrote is On the Beach: Poems and Vignettes.

Her plays include Graffiti and the co-written Venus The Love Show. Her plays have been staged in Florida and California.

=== Instructor ===
She has taught as an adjunct professor at Palm Beach State College in Florida. She been a lecturing professor at the Maui campus of the University of Hawaii.

== Personal life ==
She was married to producer and recording engineer Roger Nichols for over 30 years until his death at age 66. Their daughters are Cimcie and Ashlee Nichols.
