= Rikki Don't Lose That Number =

1974 single by Steely Dan

- Side A of the Australian single

Single by Steely Dan

from the album Pretzel Logic
- B-side: "Any Major Dude Will Tell You"
- Released: April 25, 1974
- Recorded: 1973
- Genre: Jazz rock; boogie rock; bolero; bossa nova
- Length: 3:58 (single version); 4:30 (album version)
- Label: ABC
- Songwriters: Walter Becker, Donald Fagen
- Producer: Gary Katz

Steely Dan singles chronology
"My Old School" (1973)	"Rikki Don't Lose That Number" (1974)	"Pretzel Logic" (1974)

Official audio
- "Rikki Don't Lose That Number" on YouTube

"Rikki Don't Lose That Number" is a single released in 1974 by the American rock band Steely Dan and the opening track of their third album Pretzel Logic. It was the most successful single of the group's career, peaking at number 4 on the Billboard Hot 100 in the summer of 1974.

== Recording and content ==
Victor Feldman's flapamba introduction to the song, which opens the album, is cut from the original ABC single version. The MCA single reissue (backed with "Pretzel Logic") includes the flapamba intro but fades out just before the actual end of the track. The introductory riff is an almost direct copy of the intro of Horace Silver's jazz classic "Song for My Father". Fagen has denied the similarity, saying that it is a Brazilian bass line which is common to numerous songs.

The song exemplifies Steely Dan's growing preference for session musicians: Though Jim Hodder was Steely Dan's drummer at the time, the track instead features Jim Gordon on drums (as does the bulk of Pretzel Logic), the piano is played by Michael Omartian instead of Fagen, and despite Steely Dan having two guitarists of their own, the acoustic guitar is played by sessionist Dean Parks. The guitar solo is by Jeff "Skunk" Baxter and was recorded with the guitar plugged directly into the console.

== Lyrics ==
Though fan interpretations have variously described "Rikki Don't Lose That Number" as being about marijuana dealing, an undercover operation, and even a homosexual romance (with the subject of the song given a female name and other feminine traits in order to obfuscate the truth to listeners), it is actually a straightforward song of lost love.

As usual for songs written by them, Becker and Fagen were reluctant to speak about the song's meaning, which was only revealed when writer Rikki Ducornet came forward in 2006 and said she recognized the song as being about her relationship with Fagen, whom she knew when he was a student at Bard College. She elaborated, "I was actually a young faculty wife, I was pregnant, and he thought I was cute. So he gave me his phone number, which I lost." Ducornet was living in France at the time the song was released and did not hear it until ten years later. Fagen has since confirmed that the "Rikki" in the song was a woman he had a crush on in college.

== Reception ==
Billboard described it as a "catchy, almost tango-like tune." Cash Box said that the "strong accent on harmonies with keyboard and percussion dominating the musical end make for a very entertaining track." Record World said that the "salty Latin-ish sound is in an easy vein" and that the song was a "totally nifty number."

During a 1974 interview discussing recent hit songs, John Lennon said, "I liked 'Rikki Don't Lose That Number', that was a good commercial record."

In a retrospective review for AllMusic, Stewart Mason characterized it as "one of the group's most gentle and accessible songs".

== Personnel ==
Personnel per Anthony Robustelli. Pretzel Logic's credits consist of a simple list of the musicians who contributed to the album, with no indication of what instruments they played or which songs they played them on.

Steely Dan

- Donald Fagen – lead and backing vocals
- Jeff Baxter – electric guitar
- Walter Becker – bass

Additional musicians

- Dean Parks – acoustic guitar
- Michael Omartian – piano
- Jim Gordon – drums
- Victor Feldman – percussion, flapamba
- Timothy B. Schmit – backing vocals

Technical

- Gary Katz – producer
- Roger Nichols – engineer

== Chart performance ==
=== Weekly charts ===
Chart (1974)	Peak position
Australian Singles Chart	30
Canada Top Singles (RPM)	3
US Billboard Hot 100	4
US Adult Contemporary (Billboard)	15
US Cash Box Top 100	3

Chart (1979)	Peak position
UK Singles Chart	58

=== Year-end charts ===
Chart (1974)	Rank
Canada	53
US Billboard Hot 100	51
US Cashbox Top 100	46

== Cover versions ==
- 1983 – Kenji Omura recorded a version of the song for his fourth album Gaijin Heaven.
- 1984 – Tom Robinson recorded his version for the album Hope and Glory; the single release of the song matched Steely Dan's original version by peaking at No. 58 in the UK Singles Chart.
- 1992 – Hank Marvin did an instrumental of the song on his album Into the Light.
- 1994 – Far Corporation made a cover of the song for their album Solitude.
- 2007 – Chuck Loeb did an instrumental cover of the song on his album Presence.

== Usage in media ==
The song is featured in the 1989 film Say Anything..., in which the lyrics are sung by actor John Mahoney.
