= Kid Charlemagne =

- The cover of the "Kid Charlemagne" single features Donald Fagen (top) and Walter Becker (bottom)

Single by Steely Dan

from the album The Royal Scam
- B-side: "Green Earrings"
- Released: June 1976
- Genre: Funk; jazz fusion
- Length: 4:38 (album version); 3:56 (single version)
- Label: ABC
- Songwriters: Walter Becker; Donald Fagen
- Producer: Gary Katz

Steely Dan singles chronology
"Bad Sneakers" (1975)	"Kid Charlemagne" (1976)	"The Fez" (1976)

Official audio
- "Kid Charlemagne" on YouTube

"Kid Charlemagne" is a song by American rock band Steely Dan, released in 1976 as the opening track on their album The Royal Scam. An edited version was released as a single, reaching number 82 on the Billboard Hot 100. Larry Carlton's guitar solo on the song was ranked #80 in a 2008 list of the 100 greatest guitar solos by Rolling Stone. The solo was ranked number 8 in the updated 2026 version.

== Lyrics ==
Writers Walter Becker and Donald Fagen have stated that the lyrics of "Kid Charlemagne" were loosely inspired by the rise and fall of the San Francisco-based LSD chemist Owsley Stanley.

The final verse describes Stanley’s 1967 arrest after his car reportedly ran out of gas:

Clean this mess up else we’ll all end up in jail
Those test tubes and the scale
Just get it all out of here
Is there gas in the car?
Yes, there’s gas in the car
I think the people down the hall know who you are

== Guitar solo ==
Larry Carlton's guitar solo starts at 2:18 into the song and ends at 3:08. Pete Prown and HP Newquist described it as consisting of "twisted single-note phrases, bends, and vibrant melody lines"; they called it and Carlton's "joyous, off-the-cuff break" during the song's fade-out "breathtaking." According to Rolling Stone, which ranked "Kid Charlemagne" at #80 in its list of the "100 Greatest Guitar Songs": "In the late seventies, Steely Dan made records by using a revolving crew of great session musicians through take after take, which yielded endless jaw-dropping guitar solos. Larry Carlton's multi-sectioned, cosmic-jazz lead in this cut may be the best of all: It's so complex it's a song in its own right." Nick Hornby, in Songbook, spoke of the solo's "extraordinary and dexterous exuberance", though he questioned its relationship with the "dry ironies of the song's lyrics".

Though the solo is a composite of just two takes, Carlton spent nearly two hours recording takes for the solo that were not used.

Carlton's use of tapping in the solo was cited by Adrian Belew as an early example of what he and Rob Fetters were trying to accomplish at the time when Eddie Van Halen was experimenting with the technique.

When asked if his solo on "Kid Charlemagne" was a high point of his career, Carlton said, "Probably so. I can't think of anything else that I still like to listen to as strongly as that."

In 2021 Vulfpeck guitarist Cory Wong described the solo as his "favorite guitar solo of all time".

== Reception ==
Cash Box said that "the melody and arrangement are complicated, but accessible" and "every note is necessary."

== Personnel ==
Per Robustelli and A Decade of Steely Dan liner notes.

Steely Dan

- Donald Fagen – lead and backing vocals

Additional musicians

- Larry Carlton – electric guitar
- Don Grolnick – Fender Rhodes electric piano
- Paul Griffin – clavinet
- Chuck Rainey – bass guitar
- Bernard Purdie – drums
- Michael McDonald, Venetta Fields, Clydie King, Sherlie Matthews – backing vocals

== Other appearances ==
- American rapper Kanye West sampled "Kid Charlemagne" on the song "Champion" from his 2007 album Graduation. Upon hearing "Champion", Becker and Fagen refused West's request to use the sample, but changed their minds after receiving a letter from West explaining "Champion"'s importance to him.
- American singer-songwriter Jason Isbell references "Kid Charlemagne" on the song "Open and Close" from his 2025 album Foxes in the Snow.
