= Tschaikowsky's Nutcracker Suite In Dance Tempo =

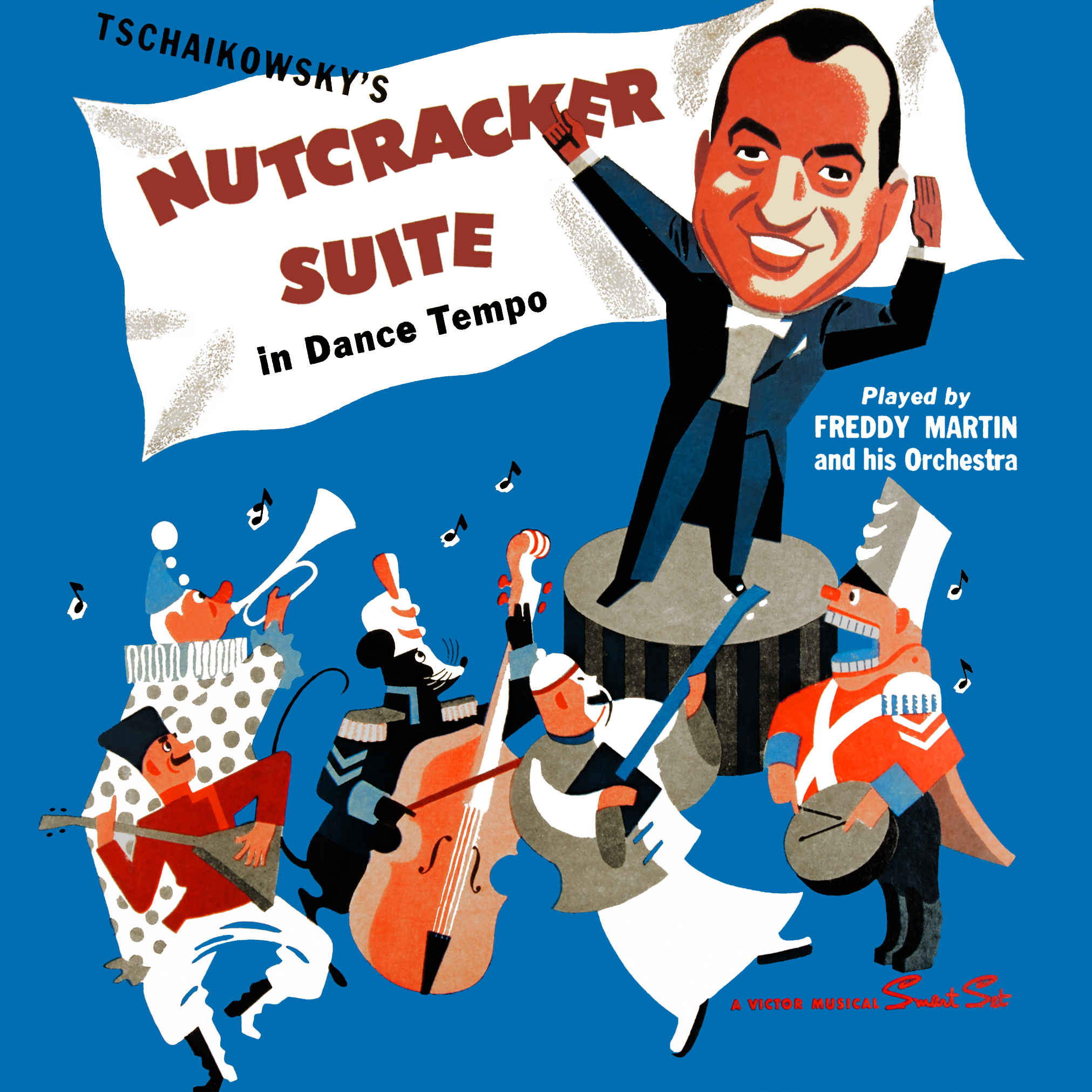

Studio album by Freddy Martin
- Released: July 1942
- Recorded: April 3 and May 15, 1942
- Genre: Dance band, swing, jazz
- Label: Victor

Freddy Martin chronology
| Tschaikowsky's Nutcracker; Suite In Dance Tempo (1942) | Smoke; Rings (1944) |

Tschaikowsky's Nutcracker Suite In Dance Tempo is a studio album of phonograph records released by bandleader Freddy Martin, featuring Ray Austin arrangements of Romantic-era Classical composer Pyotr Ilyich Tchaikovsky's suite from the 1892 ballet The Nutcracker.

== Reception ==
Released a month before the 1942-44 recording ban, the album reached number five on the December 29, 1945 Billboard Best-Selling Popular Record Albums chart, the first of its kind. Billboard Magazine offered a half-hearted review:

Freddy Martin goes on a real Tschaikowsky bender for this classical ballet of dance characterizations... While Martin's men turn in a finished performance, most of the suite's charm and spontaneity are lost. It is highly doubtful whether any of the sides can stand up on their own in the music boxes... In any event, the album makes for a pleasant novelty and certainly for pleasant listening for those not too deeply steeped in the classics.

== Track listing ==
These rearranged titles were featured on a 4-disc, 78 rpm album set, Victor P-124.

Disc 1: (27899)

1. "Overture Miniature", recorded May 15, 1942.
2. "March", recorded May 15, 1942.

Disc 2: (27900)

3. "Dance Of The Sugar-Plum Fairies", recorded May 15, 1942.
4. "Russian Dance", recorded May 15, 1942.

Disc 3: (27901)

5. "Arab Dance", recorded April 3, 1942.
6. "Chinese Dance", recorded April 3, 1942.

Disc 4: (27902)

7. "Dance Of The Reed Flutes", recorded May 15, 1942.
8. "Waltz Of The Flowers", recorded May 15, 1942.

== Reissues ==
In 1949, RCA Victor reissued the set in the same configuration on four 7-inch 45 rpm records as RCA Victor WP-124. In 1952, the album was reissued again on Extended play 45 rpm as RCA Victor EPB 3052, albeit with two 7-inch 45 rpm records, and two songs per side.
