= Smoke Rings (album) =

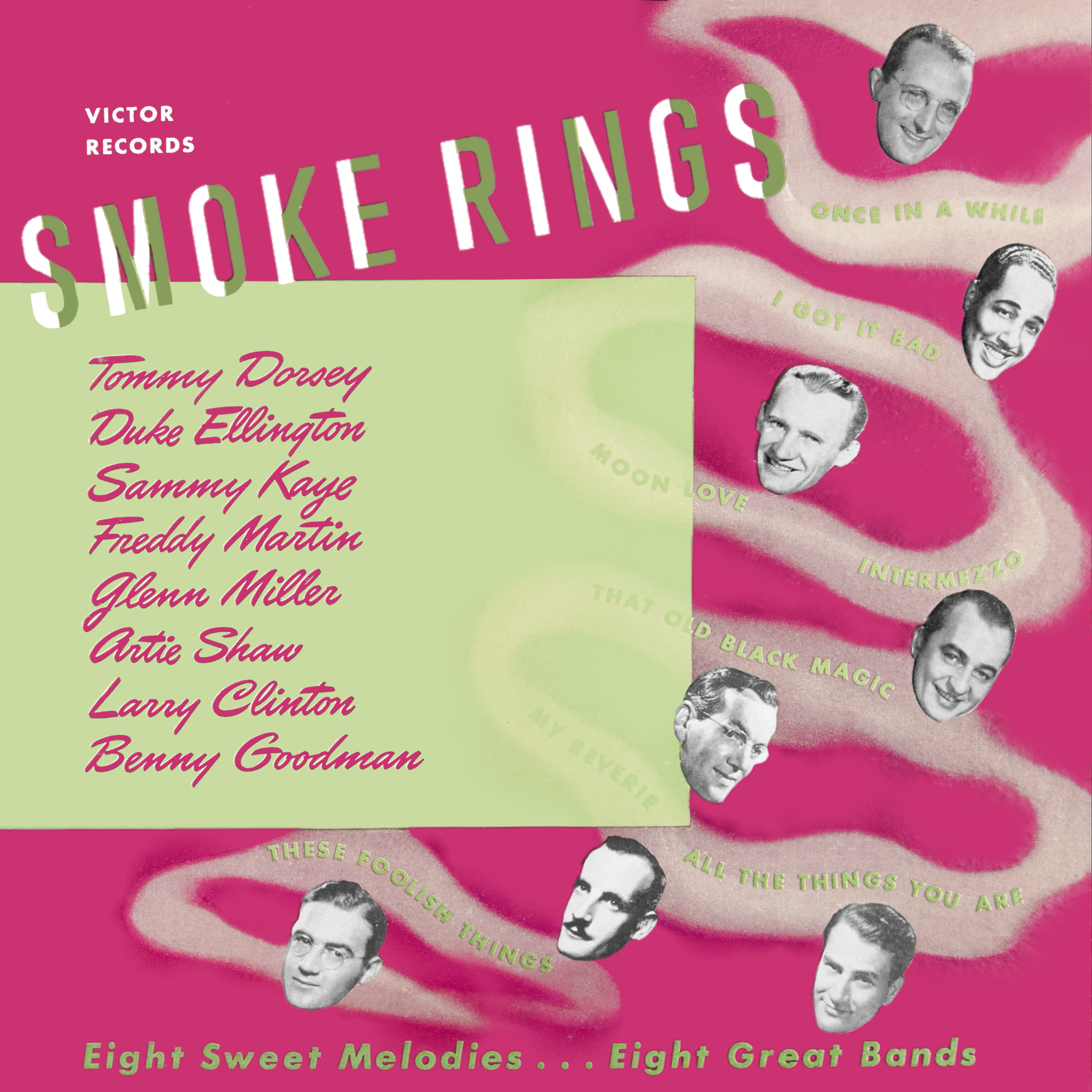

Compilation album by Various
- Released: March 23, 1944
- Recorded: 1936–1942
- Genre: Dance band, swing, jazz
- Label: Victor

Benny Goodman chronology
Up Swing (1944)	Smoke Rings (1944)	Hot Jazz (1945)

Tommy Dorsey chronology
Up Swing (1944)	Smoke Rings (1944)	Starmaker (1944)

Larry Clinton chronology
Smoke Rings (1944)	Show Parade, 1946-47 (1947)

Duke Ellington chronology
Harlem Jazz, 1930 (1943)	Smoke Rings (1944)	Ellingtonia, Vol. Two (1944)

Artie Shaw chronology
Up Swing (1944)	Smoke Rings (1944)	Artie Shaw Plays Cole Porter (1946)

Sing & Sway with Sammy Kaye chronology
Smoke Rings (1944)	Dusty Manuscripts (1948)

Freddy Martin chronology
Tschaikowsky's Nutcracker Suite In Dance Tempo (1942)	Smoke Rings (1944)	Concertos For Dancing (1947)

Glenn Miller chronology
Up Swing (1944)	Smoke Rings (1944)	Glenn Miller (1945)

Smoke Rings is a compilation album of phonograph records released by Victor Records in 1944 featuring Swing-era recordings of eight bandleaders as a part of their Musical Smart Set series. The set was released in conjunction with Up Swing during the American Federation of Musicians strike and features popular recordings by the various artists.

== Reception ==
The album's sides were titled Big Hit of, with the year released after; Smoke Rings features songs from 1936 to 1943. This could be misleading: According to Joel Whitburn, the four songs by bandleaders Benny Goodman, Tommy Dorsey, Larry Clinton and Glenn Miller were all number one hits. Ellington's "I Got It Bad" hit only the 17th position, while Artie Shaw's "All The Things You Are" and Freddy Martin's "Intermezzo" placed inside the top ten, at numbers 8 and 7 respectively. Kaye's version of "Moon Love" did not chart.

Despite the fact sister album Up Swing charted, Smoke Rings did not. Billboard described the album in April 1944 as featuring "sentimental oldies". Both releases may have been to make up for lost sales:

Victor's cancellation of the contracts to Oklahoma and Carmen Jones was a solid sock, as the Oklahoma album has sold almost 300,000 copies, the greatest album sale in the history of the disk biz.

== Track listing ==
These previously issued songs were featured on a 4-disc, 78 rpm album set, Victor P-147.

Disc 1: (20-1557)

1. $Big$ $Hit$ $of$ $1936:$ "These Foolish Things Remind Me of You", recorded June 15, 1936, with Benny Goodman and His Orchestra.
2. $Big$ $Hit$ $of$ $1937:$ "Once in a While", recorded July 21, 1937, with Tommy Dorsey and His Orchestra.

Disc 2: (20-1558)

3. $Big$ $Hit$ $of$ $1938:$ "My Reverie", recorded July 16, 1938, with Larry Clinton and His Orchestra.
4. $Big$ $Hit$ $of$ $1939:$ "Moon Love", recorded May 29, 1939, by Sing and Sway with Sammy Kaye.

Disc 3: (20-1559)

5. $Big$ $Hit$ $of$ $1940:$ "All the Things You Are", recorded October 26, 1939, with Artie Shaw and His Orchestra.
6. $Big$ $Hit$ $of$ $1941:$ "Intermezzo", recorded March 26, 1941, with Freddy Martin and His Orchestra.

Disc 4: (20-1560)

7. $Big$ $Hit$ $of$ $1942:$ "I Got It Bad and That Ain't Good", recorded June 26, 1941, with Duke Ellington and His Orchestra.
8. $Big$ $Hit$ $of$ $1943:$ "That Old Black Magic", recorded July 15, 1942, with Glenn Miller and His Orchestra.
