= Pretzel Logic (song) =

- Cover for the release in France

Single by Steely Dan

from the album Pretzel Logic
- B-side: "Through with Buzz"
- Released: October 1974
- Recorded: October 1973 to January 1974
- Genre: Blues rock; blues; jazz rock
- Length: 3:59 (Single version); 4:28 (Album version)
- Label: ABC / Probe
- Songwriters: Walter Becker, Donald Fagen
- Producer: Gary Katz

Steely Dan singles chronology
"Rikki Don't Lose That Number" (1974)	"Pretzel Logic" (1974)	"Black Friday" (1975)

Official audio
- "Pretzel Logic" on YouTube

"Pretzel Logic" is a song written by Walter Becker and Donald Fagen, released as a single by Steely Dan from their album Pretzel Logic, originally in 1974 by ABC Records. It reached number 57 in the Billboard charts. In Canada it reached number 48.

== Background ==
Steely Dan FAQ author Anthony Robustelli describes "Pretzel Logic" as a bluesy shuffle about time travel. Fagen has stated that the lyrics, including anachronistic references to Napoleon and minstrel shows, are about time travel. According to Robustelli, the "platform" referred to in the song's bridge is the time travel machine. But Something Else! critic Victor Aaron describes the lines "I stepped out on the platform/The man gave me the news/He said, 'You must be joking son/Where did you get those shoes?'” as a memorable putdown. Steely Dan biographer Brian Sweet hypothesizes that the first verse was inspired by the band's distaste for touring, particularly the tours of the American South on which their record label had sent them the previous year. The Brownsville Herald writer Bobby Alvarez felt the song was about Steely Dan's "quest for stardom" and represented their philosophy about themselves—that whatever they have not done or experienced in the past doesn't matter anymore since the past is gone.

== Composition ==
Pretzel Logic is a modified version of a 12-bar blues, a form which contains a turnaround in the last (typically four) bars. This turnaround consists of two sets of dominant 11th chords resolving to the V, and then again, down whole step, to the IV. Fagen and Becker employ 'Mu Major' voicing, which includes the 9th scale degree. The turnaround concludes with a walk-up from the flat sixth to flat seventh, before finally resolving to I at the top of the form.

== Reception ==
Billboard described "Pretzel Logic" as a "bluesy rock hit" and praised the vocals, production, and the "catchy instrumental refrain." CashBox said that "the accent here is on a funkier jazzy melody than 'Rikki.'" Record World called it "a blues construction trimmed with hall-filling harmonies" and said that "The group's ability to meander and yet keep to a hooky home base once again proves their mastery of rock thought processes." Rolling Stone critic Bud Scoppa described "Pretzel Logic" as one of the album's most conventional songs, calling it a "modified blues." Aaron regarded it as Steely Dan's song that remains most faithful to the blues, but acknowledged that a few non-blues chords are incorporated into the refrain. Scoppa particularly praised the electric guitar improvisations for their originality. According to Steely Dan biographer Brian Sweet, Walter Becker played the guitar solo. This is one of the first Steely Dan songs to feature Becker as a lead guitarist. Eduardo Rivadavia cites "Pretzel Logic" as one of several songs on the album on which Steely Dan hones their trademark sound, "as sweetly infectious as it was deceptively intricate, dark and witty." Alvarez rated it one of the best songs on the album.

== Personnel ==
Steely Dan

- Donald Fagen – lead and backing vocals, Wurlitzer electronic piano
- Walter Becker – lead guitar

Additional musicians

- Dean Parks – rhythm guitar
- Plas Johnson – saxophone
- Ollie Mitchell – trumpet
- Lew McCreary – trombone
- Wilton Felder – bass guitar
- Jim Gordon – drums
- Timothy B. Schmit – backing vocals

== Covers ==
In 1987, "Pretzel Logic" was covered by Hiram Bullock on his album Give It What You Got. He performed an electro fusion take on the song.

A live version by INXS, omitting the shuffle of the Steely Dan version, was performed during the Moontan Double J Concert At Manly Vale Hotel, October 1980 show. A recording of it was released in 2002 on the compilation Stay Young 1979–1982.

The New York Rock and Soul Revue covered it in 1991, led by Donald Fagen.

The song was performed by the Warren Haynes Band, the solo project of The Allman Brothers Band and Gov't Mule leader Warren Haynes, which he started in 2010. A staple of the band's live shows, often running over ten minutes in length and featuring multiple solos from band members, it appears in this form on their 2012 album Live at The Moody Theater.
