= Starmaker: Leviathan =

Comic book series by Adam Hamdy

Starmaker: Leviathan is a comic created by Adam Hamdy, with art by David Golding. The first issue was published by Dare Comics in December 2009.

Starmaker: Leviathan poster by Emily Hare.

== Plot ==
No plot details have been released, but creator Adam Hamdy has described Starmaker: Leviathan as a Sci Fi epic.
