= Rock Hudson filmography =

Rock Hudson (born Roy Harold Scherer Jr.; November 17, 1925 – October 2, 1985) was an American actor. One of the most popular film stars of his time, he had a screen career spanning more than three decades, and was a prominent figure in the Golden Age of Hollywood.

Hudson achieved stardom with his role in Magnificent Obsession (1954), followed by All That Heaven Allows (1955), and Giant (1956), for which he received a nomination for the Academy Award for Best Actor. Hudson also found continued success with a string of romantic comedies co-starring Doris Day: Pillow Talk (1959), Lover Come Back (1961), and Send Me No Flowers (1964). During the late 1960s, his films included Seconds (1966), Tobruk (1967), and Ice Station Zebra (1968). Unhappy with the film scripts he was offered, Hudson turned to television and was a hit, starring in the popular mystery series McMillan & Wife (1971–1977). His last role was as a guest star on the fifth season (1984–1985) of the primetime ABC soap opera Dynasty, until an AIDS-related illness made it impossible for him to continue.

== Filmography ==
=== Film ===
| Year | Title | Role | Notes | Ref. |
|---|---|---|---|---|
| 1948 | Fighter Squadron | Pilot | Uncredited | |
| 1949 | Undertow | Detective | Credited as Roc Hudson | |
| 1950 | One Way Street | Truck driver | Uncredited | |
| 1950 | Shakedown | Valet | Uncredited (59 minutes into the movie) | |
| 1950 | Peggy | Johnny "Scat" Mitchell | | |
| 1950 | Winchester '73 | Young Bull | | |
| 1950 | I Was a Shoplifter | Si Swanson - Store Detective | Small part. Two scenes with one line on each. | |
| 1950 | The Desert Hawk | Captain Ras | | |
| 1951 | Tomahawk | Burt Hanna | | |
| 1951 | Air Cadet | Upper classman | | |
| 1951 | The Fat Man | Roy Clark | | |
| 1951 | Bright Victory | Dudek | | |
| 1951 | Iron Man | Tommy "Speed" O'Keefe (Kosco) | | |
| 1952 | Bend of the River | Trey Wilson | | |
| 1952 | Here Come the Nelsons | Charles E. "Charlie" Jones | | |
| 1952 | Scarlet Angel | Frank Truscott (Panama) | | |
| 1952 | Has Anybody Seen My Gal | Dan Stebbins | | |
| 1952 | Horizons West | Neil Hammond | | |
| 1953 | The Lawless Breed | John Wesley Hardin | | |
| 1953 | Seminole | Lance Caldwell | | |
| 1953 | Sea Devils | Gilliatt | | |
| 1953 | The Golden Blade | Harun | | |
| 1953 | Gun Fury | Ben Warren | | |
| 1953 | Back to God's Country | Peter Keith | | |
| 1954 | Taza, Son of Cochise | Taza | | |
| 1954 | Magnificent Obsession | Bob Merrick | | |
| 1954 | Bengal Brigade | Capt. Jeffrey Claybourne | | |
| 1955 | Captain Lightfoot | Michael Martin | | |
| 1955 | One Desire | Clint Saunders | | |
| 1955 | All That Heaven Allows | Ron Kirby | | |
| 1955 | Never Say Goodbye | Dr. Michael Parker | | |
| 1956 | Giant | Jordan "Bick" Benedict Jr. | Nominated – Academy Award for Best Actor | |
| 1956 | Written on the Wind | Mitch Wayne | | |
| 1957 | Battle Hymn | Col. Dean Hess | | |
| 1957 | Something of Value | Peter | | |
| 1957 | The Tarnished Angels | Burke Devlin | | |
| 1957 | A Farewell to Arms | Lt. Frederick Henry | | |
| 1958 | Twilight for the Gods | Captain David Bell | | |
| 1959 | This Earth Is Mine | John Rambeau | | |
| 1959 | Pillow Talk | Brad Allen | | |
| 1961 | The Last Sunset | Dana Stribling | | |
| 1961 | Come September | Robert L. Talbot | also uncredited executive producer via 7 Pictures Corporation | |
| 1961 | Lover Come Back | Jerry Webster | also uncredited executive producer via 7 Pictures Corporation | |
| 1962 | The Spiral Road | Dr. Anton Drager | | |
| 1963 | Marilyn | Narrator | Documentary | |
| 1963 | A Gathering of Eagles | Col. Jim Caldwell | | |
| 1964 | Man's Favorite Sport? | Roger Willoughby | also uncredited executive producer via Gibraltar Productions | |
| 1964 | Send Me No Flowers | George | | |
| 1965 | Strange Bedfellows | Carter Harrison | also uncredited executive producer via Gibraltar Productions | |
| 1965 | A Very Special Favor | Paul Chadwick | also uncredited executive producer via Gibraltar Productions | |
| 1966 | Blindfold | Dr. Bartholomew Snow | also uncredited executive producer via Gibraltar Productions | |
| 1966 | Seconds | Antiochus "Tony" Wilson | also uncredited executive producer via Gibraltar Productions | |
| 1967 | Tobruk | Maj. Donald Craig | also uncredited executive producer via Gibraltar Productions | |
| 1968 | A Fine Pair | Capt. Mike Harmon | | |
| 1968 | Ice Station Zebra | Cdr. James Ferraday | | |
| 1969 | The Undefeated | Col. James Langdon | | |
| 1970 | Darling Lili | Major William Larrabee | | |
| 1970 | Hornets' Nest | Captain Turner | | |
| 1971 | Pretty Maids All in a Row | Michael "Tiger" McDrew | | |
| 1973 | Showdown | Chuck Jarvis | | |
| 1976 | Embryo | Dr. Paul Holliston | | |
| 1978 | Avalanche | David Shelby | | |
| 1980 | The Mirror Crack'd | Jason Rudd | | |
| 1984 | The Ambassador | Frank Stevenson | | |

=== Television ===
| Year | Title | Role | Notes | Ref. |
|---|---|---|---|---|
| 1954–1955 | The Colgate Comedy Hour | Himself | 2 episodes | |
| 1955 | I Love Lucy | Himself | Episode: "In Palm Springs" | |
| 1962 | The Jack Benny Program | Himself | Episode: "Rock Hudson Show" | |
| 1968–1969 | Rowan & Martin's Laugh-In | Himself | 3 episodes | |
| 1970 | The Jim Nabors Hour | Himself | 1 episode | |
| 1971–1977 | McMillan & Wife | Police Commissioner Stewart "Mac" McMillan | 40 episodes | |
| 1975–1977 | The Carol Burnett Show | Himself | 3 episodes | |
| 1978 | Wheels | Adam Trenton | Miniseries | |
| 1980 | The Martian Chronicles | Col. John Wilder | Miniseries | |
| 1980 | The Beatrice Arthur Special | Himself | TV special | |
| 1980 | Superstunt II | | TV movie | |
| 1981 | The Star Maker | Danny Youngblood | TV movie | |
| 1982 | The Devlin Connection | Brian Devlin | 13 episodes | |
| 1982 | World War III | President Thomas McKenna | Miniseries | |
| 1984 | The Vegas Strip War | Neil Chaine | TV Movie | |
| 1984–1985 | Dynasty | Daniel Reece | 9 episodes; Final role | |
