= Starmaker (album) =

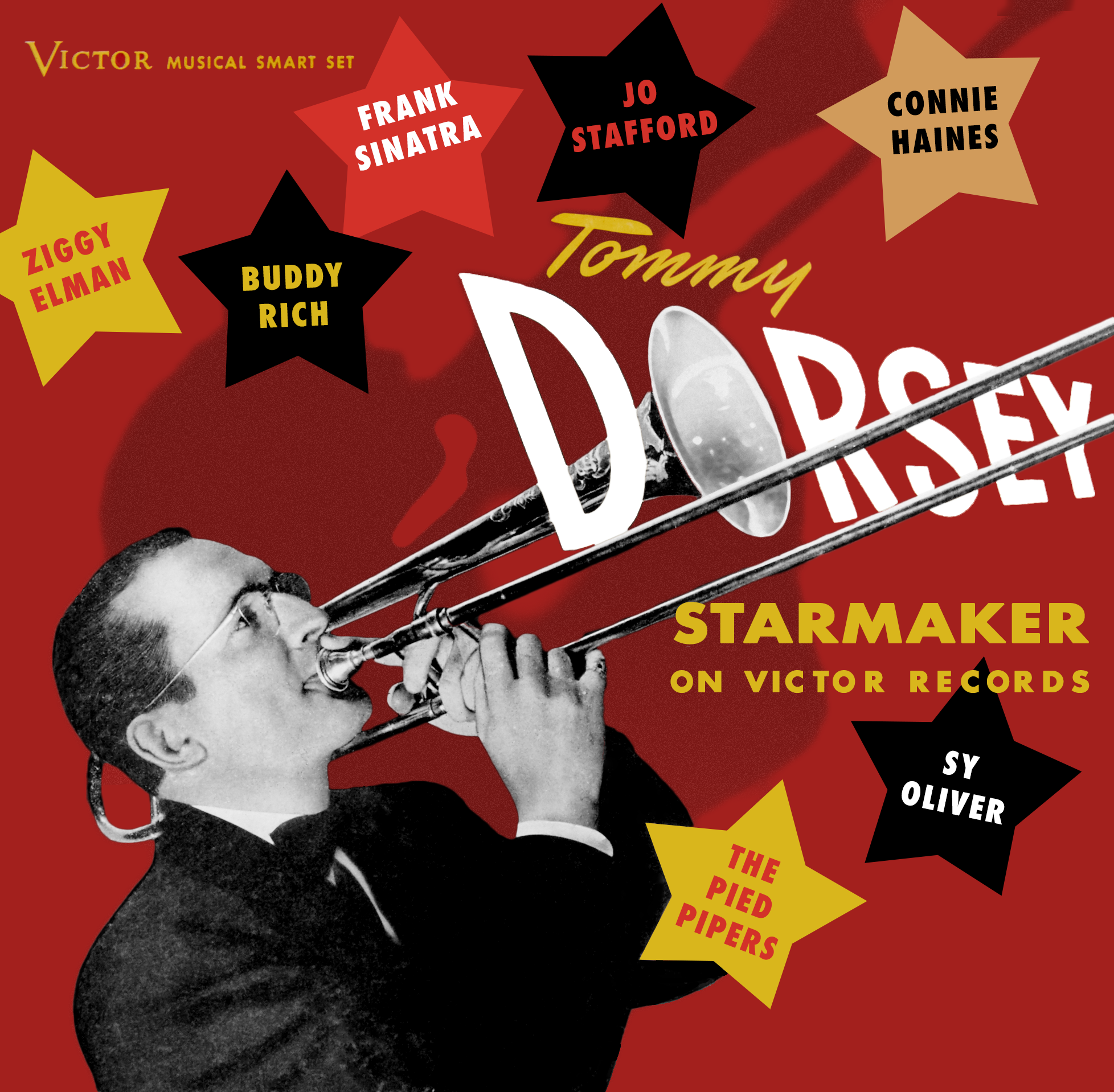

Compilation album by Tommy Dorsey
- Released: July 1944
- Recorded: 1940–1942
- Genre: Dance band, swing, jazz
- Label: Victor

Tommy Dorsey chronology
Smoke; Rings (1944)	Starmaker (1944)	Showboat (1944)

Starmaker is a compilation album of phonograph records by Tommy Dorsey, featuring collaborations between Dorsey and artists his band had a role in making popular. These include musicians such as Buddy Rich, composers and arrangers such as Sy Oliver, and vocalists like Frank Sinatra and Jo Stafford. It was released as a part of the Victor Musical Smart Set series.

== Reception ==
The songs in Starmaker were advertised in Billboard magazine as "some of the swellest songs [the big money stars] ever made with Tommy". According to Joel Whitburn, the highest-charting song of the set was "Oh! Look At Me Now", which stayed at number 2 for six weeks and charted for a total of twelve, peaking in March 1941.

== Track listing ==
These previously issued songs were featured on a 4-disc, 78 rpm album set, Victor P-150.

Disc 1: (20-1576)

1. "None But The Lonely Heart", recorded September 12, 1941 – featuring Tommy Dorsey
2. "Will You Still Be Mine?", recorded February 7, 1941 – featuring Connie Haines

Disc 2: (20-1577)

3. "Everything Happens To Me", recorded February 7, 1941 – featuring Frank Sinatra
4. "Swing High", recorded October 16, 1940 – featuring Ziggy Elman

Disc 3: (20-1578)

5. "Oh! Look At Me Now", recorded January 6, 1941 – featuring Frank Sinatra, Connie Haines, and The Pied Pipers
6. "Little Man With The Candy Cigar", recorded February 7, 1941 – featuring Jo Stafford

Disc 4: (20-1579)

7. "Swingin' On Nothin'", recorded July 15, 1941 – featuring Sy Oliver and Jo Stafford
8. "Not So Quiet, Please", recorded February 19, 1942 – featuring Buddy Rich
