= Raeanne Rubenstein =

American portrait photographer (1945–2019)

- Rubenstein in 1975.
- Born: Rae Anne Rubenstein; September 15, 1945; Staten Island, New York
- Died: November 30, 2019 (aged 74)
- Known for: Photography

Rae Anne "Raeanne" Rubenstein (September 15, 1945 – November 30, 2019) was an American portrait photographer. She was best known for her photographs from the late 1960s art rock scene and subsequently for her photographs of the country music scene.

== Early life and education ==
She was born on September 15, 1945, on Staten Island. Her father, Isidore, owned the Tudor Furniture Company, and her mother, Sylvia (Grossman) Rubenstein, taught elementary school. She attended Curtis High School before moving to the Annenberg School of Communications at the University of Pennsylvania, graduating in 1967.

== Career ==
Rubenstein started her photography career by providing complimentary portraits for the celebrity interviews of her journalist friend Lita Eliscu. This resulted in her introduction to Andy Warhol, who she regularly photographed throughout the 1960s and who also introduced her to many celebrities at his Factory venue. Bonnie Garner arranged for her to have access to the Fillmore East, where she documented many rock acts including Jimi Hendrix, Janis Joplin, Jim Morrison, John Lennon, Yoko Ono, Lou Reed, Pink Floyd and Joe Cocker.

A trip to Nashville in 1975 resulted in a love affair with the personalities of country music, producing a large body of work on celebrities like Lynn Anderson, Johnny Cash, Tammy Wynette, Waylon Jennings and Willie Nelson. This content provided material for multiple books and exhibitions.

She enrolled in 2009 in Watkins College of Art film school and subsequently produced, directed and photographed short movies. Rubenstein died on November 30, 2019, in Nashville, Tennessee.

== Bibliography ==
- Honkytonk Heroes: A Photo Album of Country Music, published by Harper & Row (hardcover 154 pages, 1975, ISBN 0060128925)
- Gone Country: Portraits of New Country Music's Stars, published by Schirmer Trade Books (hardcover 200 pages, 1997, ISBN 0028645944)
