= East St. Louis Toodle-Oo =

- Disc label to the 1927 release on Columbia Records.

Single by Duke Ellington and his Washingtonians
- B-side: "Hop Head"
- Released: 1927
- Recorded: March 1927, New York City, New York
- Genre: Jazz
- Length: 3:03
- Label: Vocalion; Columbia; Brunswick; OKeh
- Songwriter: Duke Ellington/Bubber Miley

"East St. Louis Toodle-Oo" (also "Toodle-O" and "Todolo") is a composition written by Duke Ellington and Bubber Miley and recorded several times by Ellington for various labels from 1926 to 1930 under various titles. This song was in 1927 the first charting single for Duke Ellington and was one of the main examples of his early "jungle music". The composition entered the public domain in the United States on January 1, 2023.

== Recording history ==
Ellington first recorded "Toodle-Oo" in November 1926 for Vocalion Records, which was released as Vo (1064). He recorded the composition twice more in early 1927 for Brunswick Records; the first version was not released at the time, but the second was released as Br (3480). He recorded his hit version in March 1927 for Columbia Records, under the name "the Washingtonians". Along with recording "Toodle-Oo", two other compositions were recorded at the same session, "Hop Head" and "Down in Our Alley Blues", the former of which would be released as the B-side of Columbia 953-D.

- November 29, 1926 E-4110 Vocalion 1064
- February 3, 1927 E-21636 E-21637 E-21538 Brunswick rejected
- March 14, 1927 E-21872 Brunswick 3480, Brunswick 6801, Brunswick 80000, Vocalion 1064 (some later pressings)
- March 22, 1927 W 143705-3 Columbia 953-D
- December 19, 1927 41245-1 Victor 21703
- December 19, 1927 41245-2 Victor 21703, Bluebird B-6430, Montgomery Ward M-4889
- January 19, 1928 W 400032-A OKeh 8638 (as "Harlem Twist", by Lonnie Johnson's Harlem Footwarmers, which features Johnson on guitar)
- March ?, 1928 2944-A and B Cameo 8182, Lincoln 2837, Romeo 612 (as The Washingtonians), and 108079-1 Pathe 36781, Perfect 14962 (as The Whoopee Makers) (identical to one of the takes of 2944)
- April 3, 1930 150167-3 Diva 6046-G, Velvet Tone 7072-V (as Mills' Ten Black Berries)
- February 9, 1932 71812-2 and 3 Victor L-16007 (33 1/3 10" long playing transcription, first part of a 3-song medley)
- March 5, 1937 M-180-1 Master MA-101, Brunswick m7989 (as "The New East St. Louis Toodle-O")
- February 7, 1956 Bethlehem Be BCP-60

== Music ==
"East St. Louis Toodle-Oo" features a growling plunger-muted trumpet part played by co-composer Bubber Miley, one of the first jazz trumpeters to utilize the style. This style was carried on by later Ellington trumpeters Cootie Williams (1937 recording), and Ray Nance (1956 recording).

== Other notable recordings ==
When Steely Dan covered "East St. Louis Toodle-Oo" for their 1974 album Pretzel Logic, listeners widely assumed they did so because it was mentioned in the novel Naked Lunch (which was also the source of the band's name), but band leaders Walter Becker and Donald Fagen both denied that, with Fagen explaining, "Walter and I are such jazz fans and this composition stood up so well, we wanted to hear it with all the expertise of modern hi-fi." Becker played the melody with a talk box in order to imitate Miley's plunger-muted trumpet, while Jeff "Skunk" Baxter used a pedal steel guitar for the trombone part, and Fagen played the clarinet solo on acoustic piano. Fagen sent a copy of the recording to Ellington for his 75th birthday, but there is no record of whether Ellington listened to it before his death less than a month later.

Dave Grusin recorded the song for his 1993 album Homage to Duke.
