= Flapamba =

Wooden keyboard percussion instrument

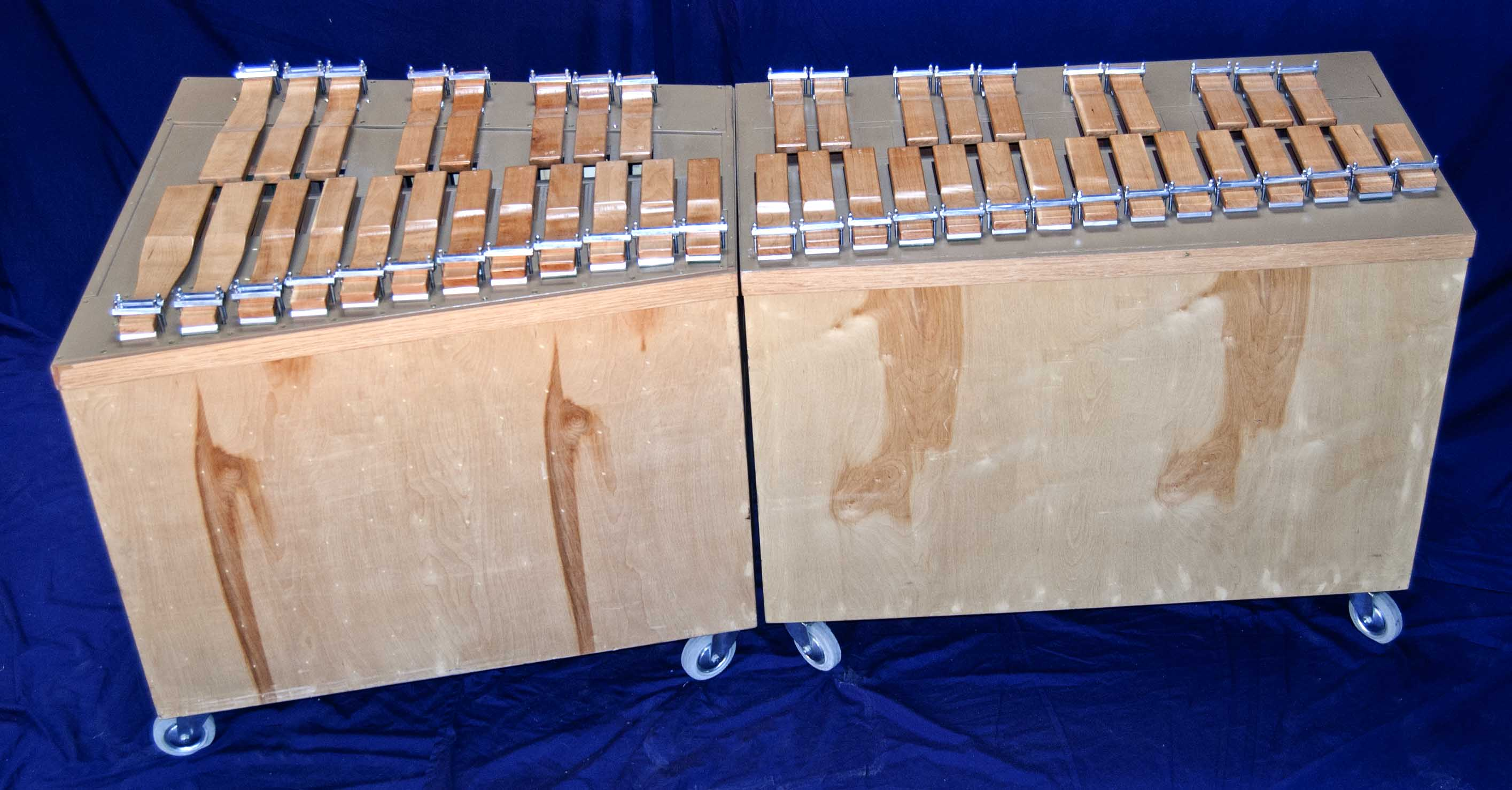
- Flapamba (from the Emil Richards Collection)

Percussion instrument
- Classification: Keyboard percussion
- Hornbostel–Sachs classification: 111.212 (Sets of percussion sticks)
- Inventor: Brent Seawell

Playing range
- F_{2}–C_{4} or C_{4}–C_{6}

The flapamba is a musical instrument in the percussion family. It consists of tuned wooden bars pinched on one side over the node and mounted over resonator boxes. Sliding the bars slightly forward or backward affects their tuning. Unlike the marimba or xylophone, the sound is not as focused tonally. It is a bit more percussive, sounding closer to tuned log drums.

== History ==
The original flapamba was invented in the 1960s by Brent Seawell. Studio percussionist Emil Richards later bought the flapamba from the Professional Drum Shop in Hollywood and added it to his instrument collection. Richards started using it in recording sessions and let other studios rent it out, leading to its inclusion in several film scores. To play it, he used either soft mallets or his fingers to get a warm, resonant sound. This original flapamba had a range from middle C up two full octaves (from C_{4} to C_{6} in scientific pitch notation).

In 2009, Richards decided to extend the lower range of the instrument. Specialty mallet craftsman Chris Banta made new bars spanning F_{2} to C_{4} and dubbed this the "bass flapamba". He also replaced the bars on the original set to create a consistent sound between the two. Both sets combined have a range from F_{2} to C_{6}.

== Use ==
The flapamba can most often be heard in film music, such as on Michael Giacchino's soundtrack for Lost or on the song "Fixer Upper" from Frozen. Composer Elmer Bernstein used it on the soundtrack for McQ. The beginning of the Steely Dan track "Rikki Don't Lose That Number" features Victor Feldman playing the flapamba, although his contribution was cut from the single version.
