= Ambrosia discography =

- Studio albums: 5
- Live albums: 1
- Compilation albums: 3
- Singles: 16

This is the discography of the band Ambrosia.

== Albums ==
=== Studio albums ===
Year	Album details	Chart positions	Certifications
Year	Album details	US	Certifications
1975	Ambrosia: Released: February 1975; Labels: 20th Century; Formats: CD, LP, CS, digital download	22	
1976	Somewhere I've Never Travelled: Released: September 1976; Labels: 20th Century; Formats: CD, LP, CS, digital download	79	
1978	Life Beyond L.A.: Released: August 1978; Labels: Warner Bros.; Formats: CD, LP, CS, digital download	19	
1980	One Eighty: Released: April 1980; Labels: Warner Bros.; Formats: CD, LP, CS, digital download	25	RIAA: Gold
1982	Road Island: Released: June 1982; Labels: Warner Bros.; Formats: CD, LP, CS, digital download	115	

=== Live albums ===
Year	Album details	Chart positions
Year	Album details	US
2002	Live at the Galaxy: Released: May 2002; Labels: Coach House; Formats: CD, LP, digital download	—
2007	Standing Room Only: Released: 2007; Labels: CMG, Sony/BMG; Formats: CD	—
"—" denotes releases that did not chart.

=== Compilation albums ===
Year	Album details	Chart positions
Year	Album details	US
1997	Anthology: Released: May 1997; Labels: Warner Bros.; Formats: CD, LP, digital download	—
2002	The Essentials: Released: June 2002; Labels: Rhino/Warner Bros.; Formats: CD, cassette, digital	—
2003	How Much I Feel and Other Hits: Released: April 2003; Labels: Collectables; Formats: CD, LP, digital download	—
"—" denotes releases that did not chart.

== Singles ==
Year	Title	Chart positions				Certifications	Album
Year	Title	US	US A/C	AUS	CAN	Certifications	Album
1975	"Holdin' on to Yesterday"	17	46	—	37		Ambrosia
1975	"Nice, Nice, Very Nice"	63	—	—	—		Ambrosia
1976	"Magical Mystery Tour"	39	—	—	—		All This and World War II
1976	"Can't Let a Woman"	102	—	—	—		Somewhere I've Never Travelled
1976	"Runnin' Away"	—	—	—	—		Somewhere I've Never Travelled
1978	"How Much I Feel"	3	11	30	2	RIAA: Gold	Life Beyond L.A.
1978	"Life Beyond L.A."	—	—	—	—		Life Beyond L.A.
1978	"If Heaven Could Find Me"	107	—	—	—		Life Beyond L.A.
1980	"Biggest Part of Me"	3	3	—	18	RIAA: Gold	One Eighty
1980	"You're the Only Woman (You & I)"	13	5	—	15	RIAA: Gold	One Eighty
1980	"No Big Deal"	105	—	—	—		One Eighty
1981	"Outside"	102	—	—	—		Inside Moves (soundtrack)
1982	"Feelin' Alive Again"	—	—	—	—		Road Island
1982	"How Can You Love Me"	86	—	—	—		Road Island
1982	"For Openers (Welcome Home)"	—	—	—	—		Road Island
1997	"I Just Can't Let Go"	—	26	—	—		Anthology
2004	"Biggest Part of Me" (remix)	—	31	—	—		Non-album single
"—" denotes releases that did not chart or were not released in that territory.
