= Anthology (Ambrosia album) =

Compilation album by Ambrosia
- Released: May 1997
- Recorded: 1996
- Genre: Progressive rock, soft rock
- Label: Warner Bros.
- Producer: David Pack

Ambrosia chronology
Road Island (1982)	Anthology (1997)	Live at the Galaxy (2002)

Singles from Anthology
- 1. "I Just Can't Let Go" Released: 1997

Anthology is a compilation album by Ambrosia, released in 1997 on Warner Bros. Records. The album includes three new recordings, including a re-recording of the David Pack solo "I Just Can't Let Go", which was released as a single. The two new recorded tracks are "Mama Don't Understand" and "Sky Is Falling".

== Track listing ==
No.	Title	Writer(s)	Length
1.	"Mama Don't Understand"	David Pack, Joe Puerta	4:31
2.	"Biggest Part of Me"	Pack	5:25
3.	"You're the Only Woman"	Pack	4:20
4.	"Nice, Nice, Very Nice"	Burleigh Drummond, Christopher North, Pack, Puerta	5:51
5.	"Life Beyond L.A."	Drummond, Pack	4:45
6.	"Livin' on My Own"	Drummond, Pack, Puerta	4:40
7.	"Holdin' on to Yesterday"	Pack, Puerta	4:16
8.	"Angola"	Pack, Puerta	3:50
9.	"How Much I Feel"	Pack	4:43
10.	"Time Waits for No One"	Drummond, North, Pack, Puerta	4:57
11.	"I Just Can't Let Go"	Pack	5:20
12.	"Heart to Heart"	Pack, Puerta	2:47
13.	"And... Somewhere I've Never Traveled"	Pack, Puerta	5:00
14.	"Sky Is Falling"	Bernie Chiaravalle, Pack, Puerta	6:02
15.	"Still Not Satisfied"	Drummond, Pack, Puerta	3:59
16.	"Cowboy Star"	Drummond, North, Pack, Puerta	5:22

== Personnel ==
Ambrosia

- David Pack – guitar, lead and backing vocals, keyboards
- Chris North – keyboards, backing vocals
- Joe Puerta – bass, lead and backing vocals
- Burleigh Drummond – drums, backing vocals, percussion

Additional musicians

- Colleen Ford – backing vocals ("Mama Don't Understand")
- James Ingram – backing vocals ("I Just Can't Let Go")
- Michael McDonald – backing vocals, bass ("I Just Can't Let Go")

== Charts ==
Singles

Year	Single	Chart	Position
1997	"I Just Can't Let Go"	Billboard Adult Contemporary	26
