= One Eighty (album) =

Studio album by Ambrosia
- Released: April 1, 1980
- Recorded: 1979–1980
- Studios: Location Recording (Burbank); Mama Jo's (North Hollywood); Monterey Recording (Glendale); Warner Bros. (Los Angeles); Sound City (Van Nuys)
- Genres: Soft rock; art rock
- Length: 39:23
- Label: Warner Bros.
- Producers: Ambrosia, Freddie Piro

Ambrosia chronology
Life Beyond L.A. (1978)	One Eighty (1980)	Road Island (1982)

Singles from One Eighty
- 1. "Biggest Part of Me" Released: March 18, 1980; 2. "You're the Only Woman (You & I)" Released: July 1, 1980; 3. "No Big Deal" Released: 1980

One Eighty is the fourth album by Ambrosia, released in 1980 on Warner Bros. Records. The title was believed by fans to signal the group's "180-degree" change in direction.

The album peaked at No. 25 on the Billboard 200, continuing the success of the band. Among the three singles, "Biggest Part of Me" and "You're the Only Woman" were top 20 hits, peaking at No. 3 and No. 13 on the Billboard Hot 100, respectively. The album also earned the band three Grammy nominations, including Best Pop Vocal Group.

Professional ratings
Review scores
Source	Rating
AllMusic	3/5 stars

== Track listing ==
Side one
No.	Title	Writer(s)	Lead vocals	Length
1.	"Ready"	David Pack	Pack	4:25
2.	"Shape I'm In"	Joe Puerta, Pack	Royce Jones	3:29
3.	"Kamikaze"	Puerta, Pack	Puerta	4:01
4.	"You're the Only Woman (You & I)"	Pack	Pack	4:20
5.	"Rock n' a Hard Place"	Puerta, Pack, Jeremy Kronsberg	Puerta	3:59

Side two
No.	Title	Writer(s)	Lead vocals	Length
6.	"Livin' on My Own"	Burleigh Drummond, Puerta, Pack	Jones, Puerta, Pack	4:41
7.	"Cryin' in the Rain"	Drummond	Drummond	4:37
8.	"No Big Deal"	Pack	Pack	4:25
9.	"Biggest Part of Me"	Pack	Pack	5:26

== Personnel ==
=== Ambrosia ===
- David Pack – guitars, lead vocals (1, 4, 6, 8, 9), backing vocals
- Joe Puerta – bass, lead vocals (3, 5, 6), backing vocals
- Burleigh Drummond – drums, percussion, lead vocals (7), backing vocals
- David Cutler Lewis – Rhodes, piano, Prophet, Mini Moog solos
- Christopher North – organ, Chamberlin, clavinet, Mini Moog
- Royce Jones – percussion, lead vocals (2)

==== Additional musicians ====
- Ernie Watts – saxophone (4, 9)
- Daniel Kobialka – violin (5)

=== Technical ===
- Produced by Ambrosia and Freddie Piro
- Associate producer – Bill Pfordresher
- Engineered and mixed by Michael Verdick
- Additional recording – Joe Bellamy and Win Kutz
- Mastered by Doug Sax at The Mastering Lab (Hollywood, California)
- Production coordinator – Teri Piro
- Tech – Robert "Omaha" Toth
- Design – Glen Christensen
- Photography – Norman Seeff

== Charts ==
Album

Year	Chart	Position
1980	Billboard 200	25

Singles

Year	Single	Chart	Position
1980	"Biggest Part of Me"	Billboard Hot 100	3
1980	"Biggest Part of Me"	Billboard Adult Contemporary	3
1980	"Biggest Part of Me"	Billboard Soul	35
1980	"Biggest Part of Me"	Dutch Singles Top 100	30
1980	"You're the Only Woman (You & I)"	Billboard Hot 100	13
1980	"You're the Only Woman (You & I)"	Billboard Adult Contemporary	5

== Certifications ==
Region	Certification	Certified units/sales
United States (RIAA)	Gold	500,000^{‡}
^{‡} Sales+streaming figures based on certification alone.
