= All Your Fault (Big Sean song) =

Song by Big Sean featuring Kanye West

from the album Dark Sky Paradise
- Genre: Hip hop
- Length: 3:44
- Label: Def Jam; GOOD
- Songwriters: Sean Anderson; Kanye West; Welbon Morris, Jr.; Lee Stone; Nashiem Myrick; Emmanuel Nickerson; Noah Goldstein; Terius Nash; David Pack
- Producer: Kanye West

"All Your Fault" is a song recorded by American rapper Big Sean featuring fellow rap artist Kanye West, from Sean's third studio album Dark Sky Paradise. It contains samples from Ambrosia's 1978 song "How Much I Feel" and features additional vocals from Travis Scott. The song was produced by Kanye West, with co-production by OG Webbie, and additional producion by Nashiem Myrick, Mano, and Noah Goldstein.

== Music video ==
On June 24, 2015, a music video was released for the track, although it had not been released as a single. A video for the fellow album track “I Know,” featuring Jhené Aiko released on the same day. Directed by Mark Mayer and Aaron Platt, the video primarily features Sean and West performing alongside several models.

== Commercial performance ==
Upon the release of Dark Sky Paradise, "All Your Fault" charted at number 80 on the US Billboard Hot 100. It peaked at number 28 on the US Hot R&B/Hip-Hop Songs chart in the same week and spent a total of three weeks on the chart.

== Charts ==
Chart (2015)	Peak position
US Billboard Hot 100	80
US Hot R&B/Hip-Hop Songs (Billboard)	28

== Certifications ==
Region	Certification	Certified units/sales
United States (RIAA)	Gold	500,000^{‡}
^{‡} Sales+streaming figures based on certification alone.
