= Anywhere You Go =

Studio album by David Pack
- Released: November 1985
- Studios: Channel Recording (Burbank); Producer's One (Los Angeles); MCA/Whitney Studios (Glendale); Bill Schnee Studio (North Hollywood); James Newton Howard's home studio (Santa Monica)
- Genres: Rock; soft rock
- Length: 46:19
- Label: Warner Bros.
- Producers: David Pack; Michael Verdick; James Newton Howard

David Pack chronology
Anywhere You Go (1985)	Unborn (2004)

Anywhere You Go is the debut solo album by David Pack, former lead singer of Ambrosia. It was released in November 1985 on Warner Bros. Records. The album contains three charting singles. One of the tracks, "Prove Me Wrong", was used in the movie White Nights and was Pack's only solo entry in the US Billboard Hot 100, peaking at number 95. The songs "I Just Can't Let Go" and "That Girl Is Gone" placed in the Top 20 on the US Adult Contemporary chart.

== Track listing ==
All tracks are written by David Pack, with additional writers noted.

Side one
No.	Title	Writer(s)	Length
1.	"Anywhere You Go"	Mike Porcaro; Jai Winding	5:00
2.	"I Just Can't Let Go"		4:54
3.	"Won't Let You Lose Me"	Randy Goodrum; James Newton Howard	3:37
4.	"My Baby"		4:17
5.	"That Girl Is Gone"		4:46

Side one
No.	Title	Writer(s)	Length
6.	"She Don't (Come Around Anymore)"	Michael McDonald; James Ingram	5:26
7.	"Do Ya"	Jamie Bernstein	4:48
8.	"Prove Me Wrong" (from the Columbia motion picture White Nights)	Howard	4:20
9.	"No Direction (No Way Home)"		5:46
10.	"Just Be You"		4:15
Total length:			46:19

== Personnel ==
=== Musicians ===
- David Pack – lead vocals, backing vocals (2), harmony vocals (4, 6, 10), guitar (1–6, 8–10), keyboards (1, 2, 4–9), DMX programming (1, 7, 9), synth bass (2, 4, 6, 9), rhythm guitar (7), Moog bass (7), piano (10), Yamaha DX7 (10), vocal arrangements (2), harmony vocal arrangements (4), arrangements
- Kerry Livgren – keyboards (1), guitar solos (4, 7)
- Jai Winding – keyboards (1), co-arrangements (1)
- James Newton Howard – keyboards (3, 6, 8, 9), co-arrangements (3), synth bass (6, 8, 9), piano (10), Yamaha DX7 (10), string arrangements
- David "Hawk" Wolinski – Emulator programming (7, 8)
- Mike Porcaro – bass (1), co-arrangements (1)
- Joe Puerta – bass (3, 5), harmony vocals (5), backing vocals (5), harmony vocal arrangements (4)
- Will McGregor – bass (6, 10)
- Stanley Clarke – bass (7)
- Prairie Prince – drums (1), co-arrangements (1)
- George Perilli – drums (2–6, 9, 10)
- John Robinson – drums (7)
- Jamie Bernstein – DMX programming (7)
- Jeff Porcaro – drums (8)
- Burleigh Drummond – percussion (2–5), harmony vocals (4), harmony vocal arrangements (4)
- Paulinho da Costa – percussion (5, 7)
- Ernie Watts – saxophone (2)
- Jerry Hey – horn arrangements (4)
- James Ingram – backing vocals (2), vocal arrangements (2)
- Michael McDonald – backing vocals (2), vocal arrangements (2), harmony vocals (6)
- Royce Jones – harmony vocals (4), harmony vocal arrangements (4)
- John Elefante – backing vocals (5)
- Jennifer Holliday – backing vocals (7)
- Lisa Harrison – backing vocals (10)
- Cynthia Rhodes – backing vocals (10)

=== Technical ===
- Executive producers – Lenny Waronker and Michael Ostin
- Produced by David Pack, Michael Verdick (1–7, 9, 10), and James Newton Howard (8)
- Engeineered by Michael Verdick
- Additional engineers – Ben Rodgers (1–7, 9, 10) and Ross Pallone (8)
- String recorded by Allen Sides at Ocean Way Recording (Los Angeles, CA)
- Mixed by Michael Verdick (1, 10), Ian Eales (1, 2, 4, 5, 9), Mick Guzauski (3, 6, 7, 10), Bill Schnee (8), and David Schober (9)
- Assistant mixing engineers – Daren Klein and Richard McKernan (3, 6, 7, 10)
- Mastered by Doug Sax at The Mastering Lab (Hollywood, CA)
- Production coordinator – Ivy Skoff
- Art direction – Norman Moore and Jeffrey Kent Ayeroff
- Design – Norman Moore
- Photography – Jim Shea
- Management – The Fitzgerald/Hartley Company

== Charts ==
=== Singles ===
Title	Release	Peak chart positions		
Title	Release	CAN	US	US AC
"Prove Me Wrong"	1986	—	95	—
"That Girl Is Gone"	1986	93	—	16
"I Just Can't Let Go"	1986	—	—	13
