= Road Island (album) =

Studio album by Ambrosia
- Released: May 3, 1982
- Recorded: 1982
- Studios: Davlen Studios (Los Angeles); Producer's Workshop (Los Angeles); Audio International Studios (London); Konk Studios (London)
- Genres: Progressive rock, pop rock
- Length: 39:01
- Label: Warner Bros.
- Producer: James Guthrie

Ambrosia chronology
One Eighty (1980)	Road Island (1982)	Anthology (1997)

Singles from Road Island
- 1. "Feelin' Alive Again" Released: 1982; 2. "How Can You Love Me" Released: 1982; 3. "For Openers (Welcome Home)" Released: 1982

Professional ratings
Review scores
Source	Rating
AllMusic	3/5 stars

Road Island is the fifth and final album by Ambrosia, released on May 3, 1982 on Warner Bros. Records. Produced by James Guthrie, the album marks the band's return to their progressive rock roots.

Despite positive reviews from critics, the album was a commercial disappointment, peaking at #115 on the Billboard 200. "How Can You Love Me" only managed to reach #86 on the Billboard Hot 100, while "For Openers (Welcome Home)" peaked at #44 on the Mainstream Rock charts.

== Track listing ==
Side one
No.	Title	Writer(s)	Lead vocals	Length
1.	"For Openers (Welcome Home)"	Drummond, Lewis, Pack, Puerta	Pack	5:31
2.	"Still Not Satisfied"	Drummond, Pack, Puerta	Puerta	3:57
3.	"Kid No More"	Puerta, Pack	Pack	2:56
4.	"Feelin' Alive Again"	Pack	Pack	5:46

Side two
No.	Title	Writer(s)	Lead vocals	Length
5.	"How Can You Love Me"	Puerta, Pack	Pack	4:02
6.	"Fool Like Me"	Puerta	Puerta	4:31
7.	"Ice Age"	Drummond, Pack, Bernstein, Puerta	Pack	7:07
8.	"Endings"	Pack	Pack	5:11

== Personnel ==
=== Ambrosia ===
- David Pack – guitar, keyboards, string arrangements (7), lead vocals (1, 3–5, 7, 8), backing vocals
- Joe Puerta – bass, acoustic guitar (6), lead vocals (2, 6), backing vocals
- Burleigh Drummond – drums, percussion, backing vocals
- Christopher North – organ, Clavinet, backing vocals
- David Cutler Lewis – keyboards, synthesizers
- Royce Jones – backing vocals

==== Additional musicians ====
- Jim Horn – saxophone (3)
- Jimmie Haskell – string and horn arrangements (4)
- Andrew Powell – string arrangements (7)

=== Technical ===
- Produced by James Guthrie
- Assistant engineers – Simon Hurrell (Audio International), Ben Rodgers (Producer's Workshop), Ernie Sheesley (Davlen), Damian Korner (Konk)
- Mastered by Doug Sax at The Mastering Lab (Hollywood, California)
- Sound equipment (London) – Phil Taylor
- Album artwork – Ralph Steadman
- Art direction – Christine Sauers
- Management – Bruce Cohn

== Charts ==
=== Album ===
Year	Chart	Position
1982	Billboard 200	115

=== Singles ===
Year	Single	Chart	Position
1982	"How Can You Love Me"	Billboard Hot 100	86
1982	"For Openers (Welcome Home)"	Billboard Top Tracks	44
