= Christopher North (Ambrosia) =

American musician (1951–2026)

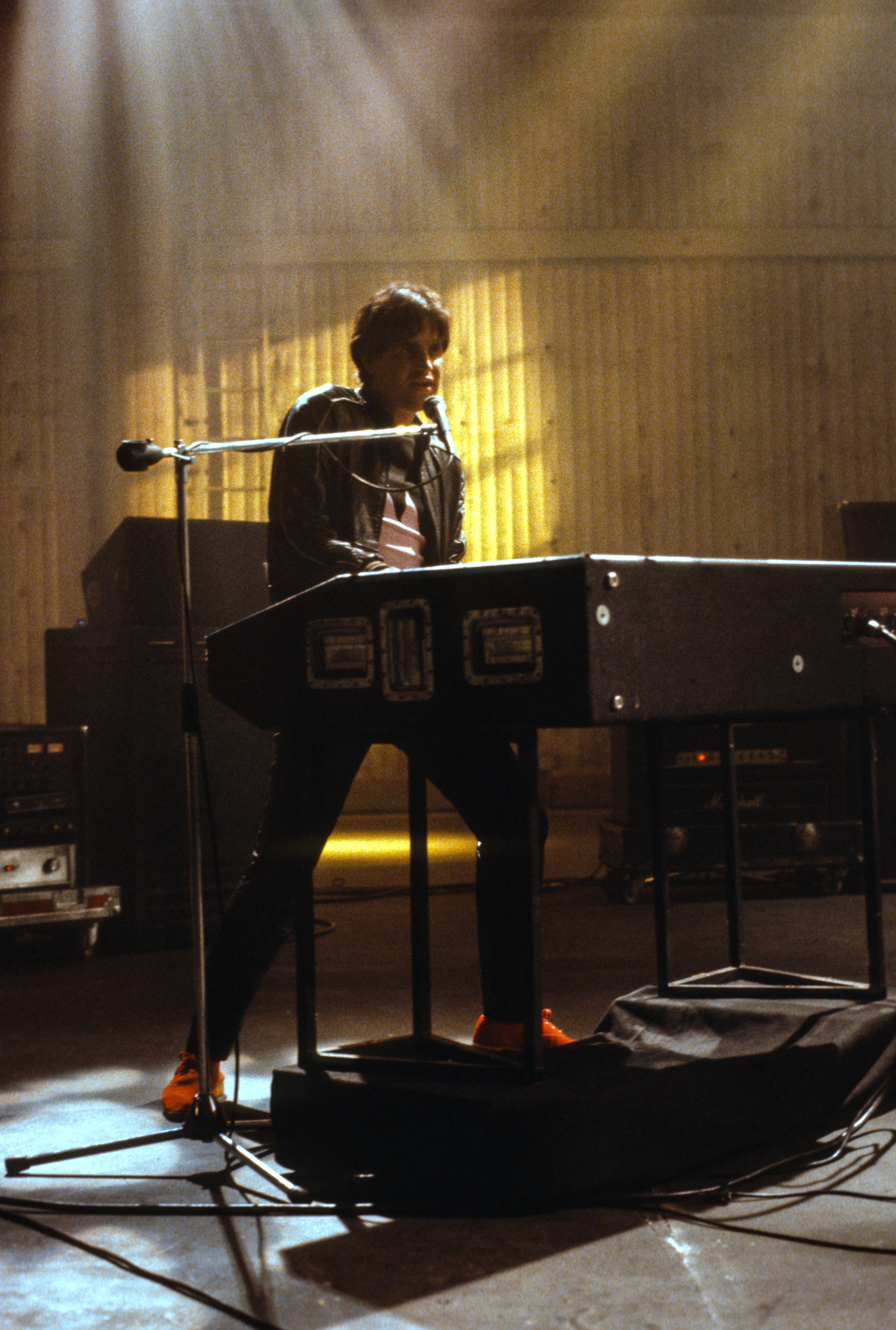
- North in 1982

Background information
- Born: January 26, 1951; San Francisco, California, U.S.
- Died: March 30, 2026 (aged 75) Los Angeles, California, U.S.
- Genres: Soft rock; art rock; progressive rock
- Instruments: Hammond Organ; keyboards; synthesizers; glockenspiel
- Years active: 1964–2026
- Member of: Ambrosia

Christopher Reed North (January 26, 1951 – March 30, 2026) was an American musician. He was the founding keyboardist of the American progressive rock band Ambrosia.

== Early life ==
Christopher Reed North was born in San Francisco on January 26, 1951. He grew up in San Pedro, California, playing in various bands through junior high and high school. Some of the early bands he played with were The Proones, The Livin End, and Thee Exceptions. In 1968 he formed the psychedelic rock band Blue Toad Flax with Tom Trefethen, playing organ and singing lead vocals.

== Career ==
=== Ambrosia ===
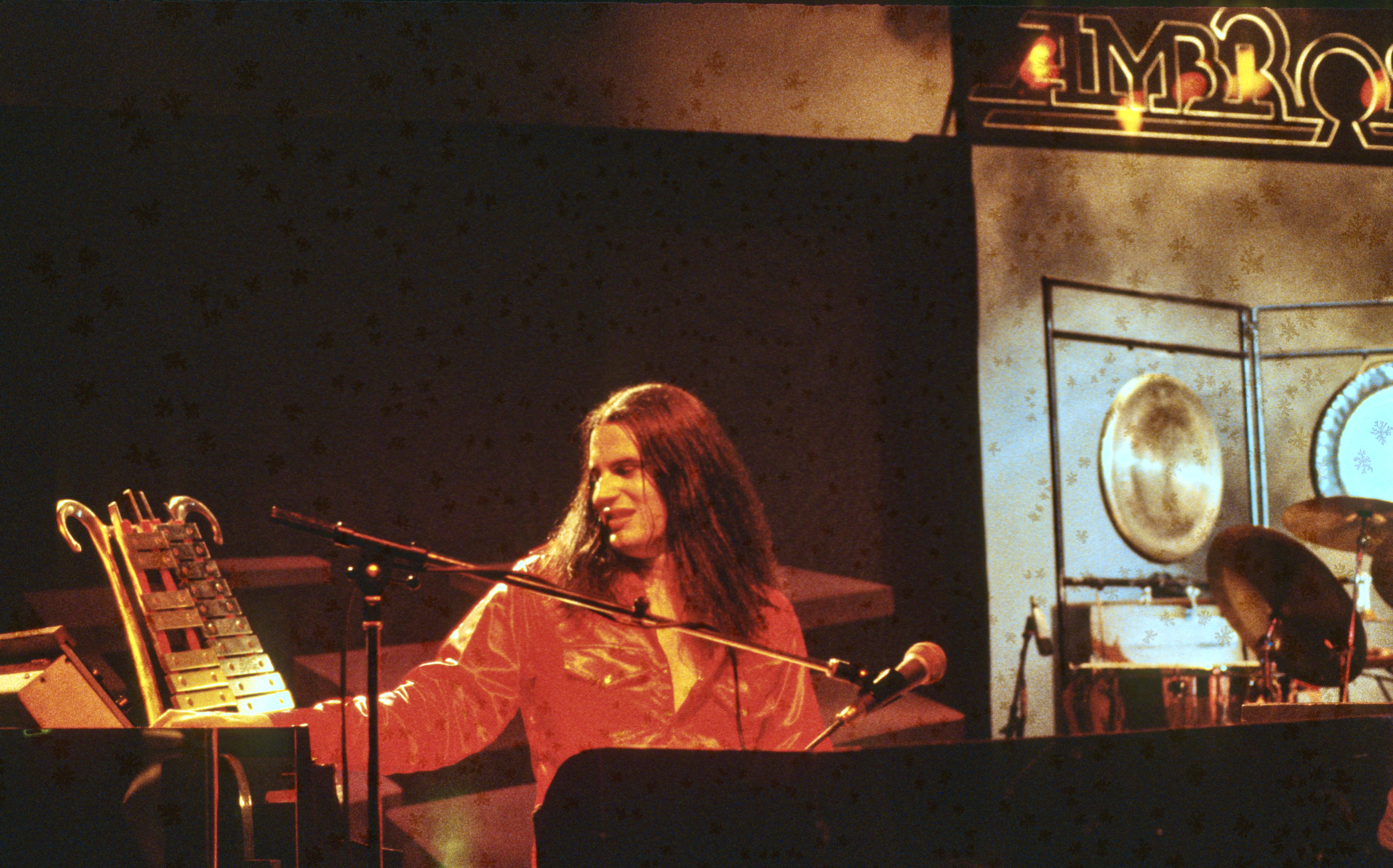
North with Ambrosia

In 1970 he formed the progressive rock band Ambrosia with David Pack, Joe Puerta and Burleigh Drummond. Puerta invited North to join after seeing him perform in a "dimly lit room" one night: "There was a coffin with speakers in it. And at the end of the room, Chris was there, playing the organ with a bottle of wine on the top, smoking a cigarette, and there was a girl massaging his shoulders as he played, so I go, 'We gotta get this guy in the band'".

He was known for his very intense live performances. North and the other members of Ambrosia contributed to the album Tales of Mystery and Imagination by The Alan Parsons Project.

In 1977, while the band was recording their Life Beyond L.A. album, North suffered a breakdown and left the band, only appearing on two tracks on the album. While he was out of the band, they recorded their biggest hit "How Much I Feel". He returned a year later in late 1978 for a tour.

Ambrosia reformed after a few years off in 1989, and North continued to tour with Puerta and Drummond until 2024 averaging around 60 dates a year.

=== Other work ===
North played organ and piano on the hit songs "Galilee" and "Rock 'N' Roll Preacher" from the debut album by Chuck Girard and also on Girard's 1980 album The Stand. North played organ on the John Lennon tribute single "Johnny's Gone Away" written and produced by Tom Trefethen with Alan Parsons as executive producer.

In 2014 North played organ on the song "The Soft Parade" from Light My Fire: A Classic Rock Salute to The Doors, a tribute album to The Doors, with Graham Bonnet on vocals and Steve Hillage on guitar.

== Personal life and death ==
North was diagnosed with throat cancer in 2024. The band announced on their Facebook in October 2025 that his fight with cancer was successful, but he was back in the hospital later the same year after being accidentally struck by a vehicle, an incident that led to him contracting pneumonia, which weakened his health. According to a Facebook post by David Pack, the collision involved North being hit by an "out of control speeding car" while walking to a restaurant. He died in a Los Angeles hospice on March 30, 2026, at the age of 75.

== Reception ==
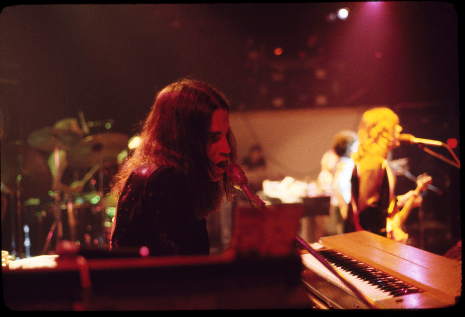
North performing with Ambrosia in 1976

North is listed on the All Time Hammond Pops list three times for his solos on Ambrosia hits “Holdin' on to Yesterday”, “Biggest Part of Me” and “You're the Only Woman (You & I)”. He was also listed from 1976–1981 as one of the top multi-keyboardists by Keyboard Magazine at which time they discontinued the list.

== Discography ==
Ambrosia

- Ambrosia (1975)
- Somewhere I've Never Travelled (1976)
- Life Beyond L.A. (1978)
- One Eighty (1980)
- Road Island (1982)

Other artists

- Chuck Girard — Chuck Girard (1974)
- Tales of Mystery and Imagination — The Alan Parsons Project (1976)
- The Stand — Chuck Girard (1980)
- Real World — Tin Drum (1996)
- Light My Fire: A Classic Rock Salute to The Doors — Various Artists (2014)
