= Douglas Jackson =

Douglas Jackson may refer to:

- Douglas Jackson (author) (born 1956), Scottish novelist
- Douglas Jackson (businessman) (born 1957), United States–based co-founder of e-gold
- Douglas N. Jackson (1929–2004), Canadian psychologist
- Douglas S. Jackson (born 1954), Tennessee politician
- Doug Jackson (ice hockey) (1924–1980), Canadian ice hockey goaltender
- Doug Jackson (musician), American guitarist
- Douglas Jackson (filmmaker) (born 1940), Canadian filmmaker
- Douglas Jackson (rugby union) (1941–2018), Scottish rugby union player

== See also ==
- Charles Douglas Jackson (1902–1964), expert on psychological warfare
