= Fred Beato =

Cuban-American musician

Fred Beato revisits Miami's Freedom Tower, where he was accepted into America in 1962 at age 10.

Fred Beato (born 1952) is a Cuban-American musician known for being one of the participants of Operation Peter Pan, owner of Beato Bags and drummer of Beato Band with former Ambrosia singer David Pack.

== Early life ==
After the Cuban Revolution in January 1959, many Cubans feared that the government would take their children away from them, which caused many Cubans, like Fred’s parents, to send their child to the United States under the US government sponsored program “Operation Peter Pan”.

== Career ==
=== Music ===
==== Symbols of Tyme ====
In high school, Fred formed a rock band with his Torrance High School classmates and former Ambrosia front-man David Pack. They would later win the national Battle of The Bands in 1968, held in Atlantic City, NJ. In 2017,

==== Beato Band ====
In 2016, Fred Beato reunited with David Pack to form Beato Band and recorded an album Beato Band.

==== Fredy Boy ====
Fred Assembled a band Fredy Boy to record the album Tail of the Shark. Musicians on the record include “Tom Croucier, Grammy Winner Raul Pineda, guitar maven Jeff Kollman and the legendary Joe Porcaro, just to name a few. (In addition to all that, while at Capitol Fred worked with renowned engineer/producer and 23 time Grammy Winner, Al Schmitt, who mixed several of the tracks on the record).”

=== Business ===
Fred Beato is the owner of Beato Bags that manufactures and distributes bags to transport musical equipment. Fred also endorses Canopus drums.

== Discography ==
- 2016 - Beato Band
- 2017 - Fredy Boy - Tail of the Shark

== See also ==
- David Pack
- Ambrosia
- Joe Porcaro
- Operation Peter Pan
- Cuban-Americans
