= Ambrosia (album) =

Studio album by Ambrosia
- Released: February 1975
- Recorded: 1974
- Studios: Mama Jo's, North Hollywood
- Genre: Progressive rock
- Length: 40:00
- Label: 20th Century Fox
- Producer: Freddie Piro

Ambrosia chronology
Ambrosia (1975)	Somewhere I've Never Travelled (1976)

Singles from Ambrosia
- 1. "Holdin' on to Yesterday" Released: June 1975; 2. "Nice, Nice, Very Nice" Released: June 1975

Ambrosia is the debut album by Ambrosia. It was released in 1975 on 20th Century Fox Records. It spawned the top 20 chart single "Holdin' on to Yesterday" as well as the minor hit "Nice, Nice, Very Nice". The latter sets to music the lyrics to a poem in Kurt Vonnegut's Cat's Cradle. The album was nominated for a Grammy Award for Best Engineered Recording (other than Classical). Alan Parsons was the mixdown engineer for Ambrosia's first album and the producer for their second.

== Track listing ==
Side one
No.	Title	Writer(s)	Lead vocals	Length
1.	"Nice, Nice, Very Nice"	Kurt Vonnegut, Jr., Christopher North, David Pack, Joe Puerta, Burleigh Drummond (Note: Though the album packaging does not delineate who wrote the music and who wrote the lyrics for most of the songs, in the case of "Nice, Nice, Very Nice" the insert credits as follows: Lyrics - Vonnegut, Puerta; Music - Puerta, Pack, North, Drummond.)	Puerta	5:49
2.	"Time Waits for No One"	Drummond, North, Pack, Puerta	Pack and Puerta	5:01
3.	"Holdin' on to Yesterday"	Puerta, Pack	Pack	4:19
4.	"World Leave Me Alone"	Pack	Pack	3:17

Side two
No.	Title	Writer(s)	Lead vocals	Length
5.	"Make Us All Aware"	Drummond, North, Pack, Puerta	Pack	4:28
6.	"Lover Arrive"	Pack	Pack	3:12
7.	"Mama Frog"	Drummond, North, Pack, Puerta	Puerta	6:06
8.	"Drink of Water"	Drummond, North, Pack, Puerta	Puerta with Pack	6:29

== Personnel ==
=== Ambrosia ===
- David Pack – guitar, keyboards (6), lead vocals (2–6, 8), backing vocals
- Joe Puerta – bass, lead vocals (1, 2, 7, 8), backing vocals
- Burleigh Drummond – drums, percussion, bassoon, backing vocals
- Christopher North – keyboards, backing vocals

==== Additional musicians ====
- Chuck Girard – backing vocals
- Keith Johnson – backing vocals
- Jim West – backing vocals
- Fletch Wiley – arrangements
- Odessa Balalaika Ensemble
  - David Lieberman – Balalaika
  - Peter Rothe – Balalaika
  - Judy Sherman – Balalaika
  - Linda O'Brien – Balalaika
  - Jonathan Rothe – Domra
  - Stephen Wolownik – Domra
- Daniel Kobialka – violin
- Michael Granger – synthesizer programming
- James Newton Howard – synthesizer programming

=== Technical ===
- Produced by Freddie Piro
- Engineered by Chuck Johnson, Billy Taylor, Freddie Piro, and Tom Trefethen
- Mixed by Alan Parsons
- Mastered by Doug Sax at The Mastering Lab (Hollywood, California)
- Cover art – Shusei Nagaoka
- Cover lettering – Michael Manoogian
- Photography – Eddie Douglas

== Charts ==
=== Weekly charts ===
Chart (1975)	Peak position
Canada Top Albums/CDs (RPM)	54
US Billboard 200	22

=== Year-end charts ===
Chart (1975)	Position
US Billboard 200	81

Singles

Year	Single	Chart	Position
1975	"Holdin' on to Yesterday"	Billboard Hot 100	17
1975	"Holdin' on to Yesterday"	Billboard Easy Listening	46
1975	"Holdin' on to Yesterday"	Cash Box Top 100	18
1975	"Holdin' on to Yesterday"	Canada RPM Top Singles	37
1975	"Holdin' on to Yesterday"	Dutch Single Top 100	36
1975	"Nice, Nice, Very Nice"	Billboard Hot 100	63
