= Mary Harris (musician) =

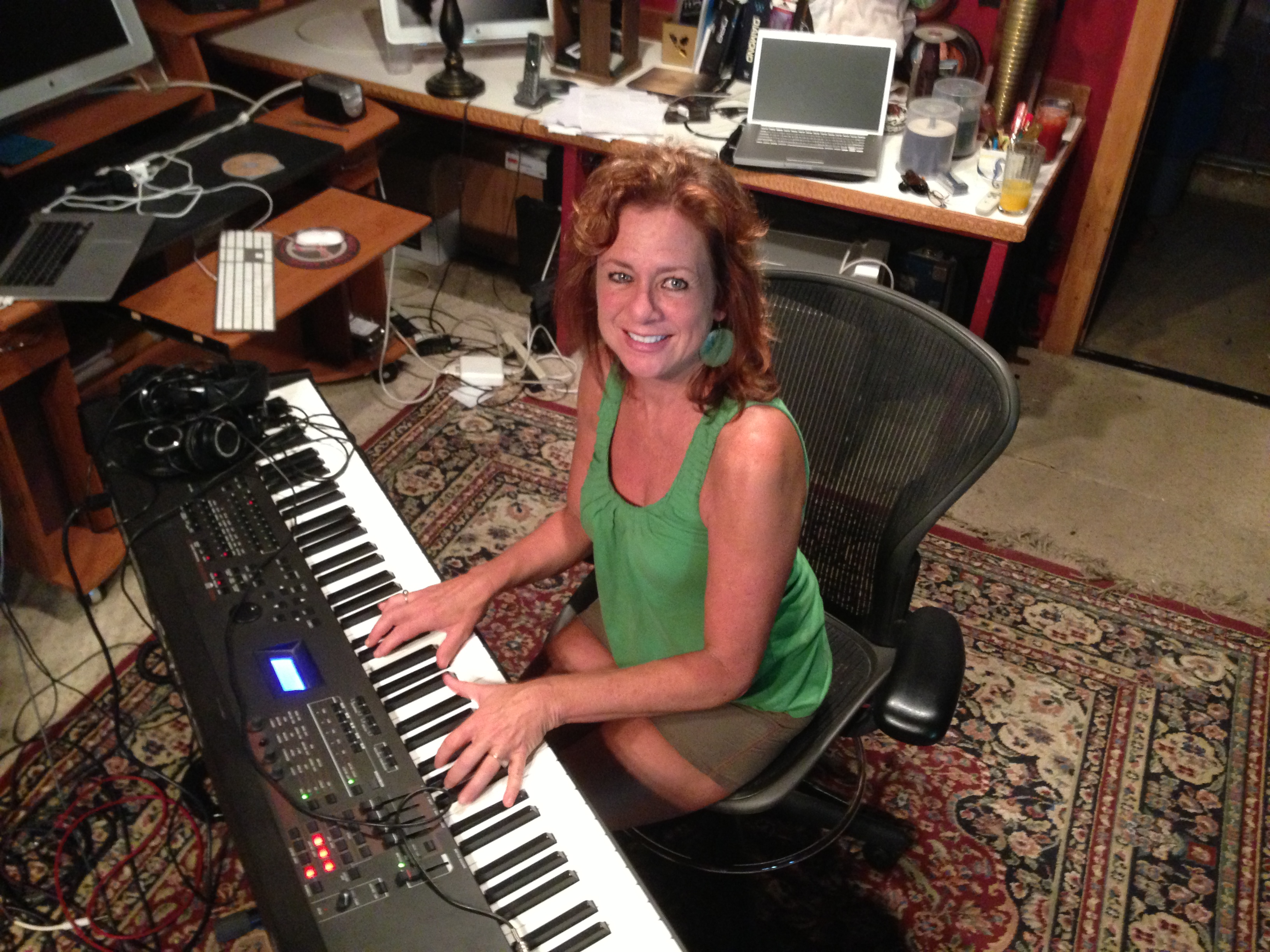
- Harris in 2013

Background information
- Born: Oakland, California, U.S.
- Instruments: Keyboards; vocals
- Years active: 1976–present
- Labels: MCA; Tin Drum Music
- Website: www.tindrummusic.com

Mary Harris is an American keyboardist, singer, songwriter, arranger, and producer. Since 2012 she has performed as a member of the band Ambrosia. As a member of Jimmy Buffett's Coral Reefer Band she arranged vocals and sang on recordings and live performances, and has worked with Stewart Copeland and Stanley Clarke, and recorded for Pink Floyd. She is also a founding member of the group Tin Drum, along with her husband and musical partner Burleigh Drummond, who also performs with her in Ambrosia.

== Early life ==
Harris began playing piano at age four, starting formal lessons at age five. She grew up from early childhood in the town of Three Rivers, California, where she performed from age ten on with family members locally.

== Early music career ==
Harris' first paying music performances were with bands including Oak Grove and Fair Game in Three Rivers in the seventies and early eighties. She moved to Los Angeles, California in 1982.

== Professional career ==
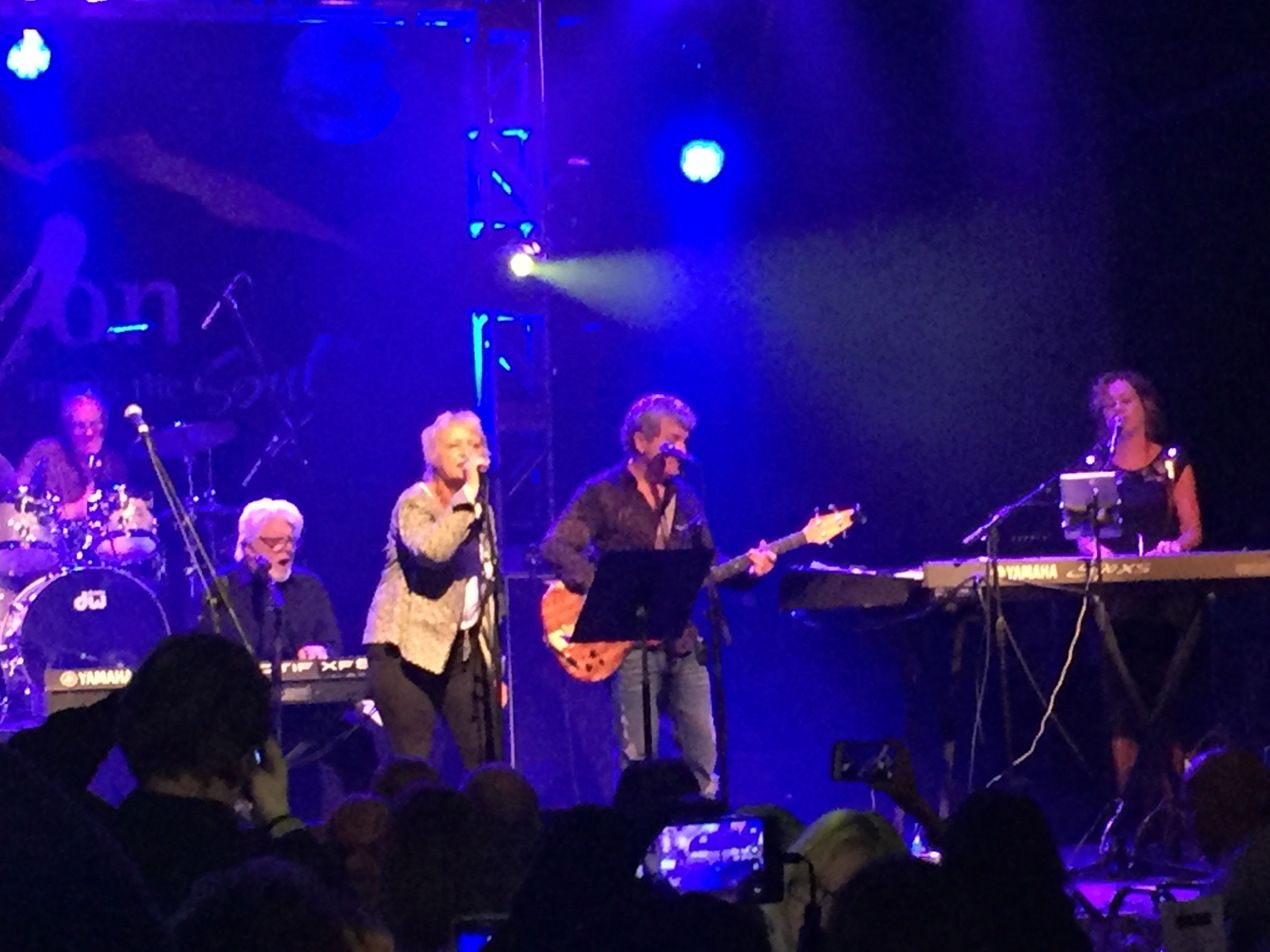
Harris at right, onstage with (from left) Burleigh Drummond, Michael McDonald, Amy Holland, and Joe Puerta on 3-20-16 at the Canyon Club in Agoura Hills, CA in a benefit concert.

Harris became well known for her singing and vocal arranging with Jimmy Buffett as a long-time member of the Coral Reefer Band. She joined Buffett's band on the recommendation of Coral Reefer Band singer Brie Howard. Harris has performed and recorded with numerous notable music acts including Stewart Copeland, and Stanley Clarke in the band Animal Logic

Harris joined the progressive rock group Ambrosia in 2012 as a full-time member, and is currently active in touring, composing and recording with the band, which includes her husband and Ambrosia founding member Burleigh Drummond.

== Tin Drum and Bill Champlin's Wunderground ==
Besides Ambrosia, Harris and Drummond perform together onstage in California with two other groups: their own band Tin Drum, formed in the 1990s, which has released three albums to date, and Bill Champlin's Wunderground, since 2018.
