= Somewhere I've Never Travelled =

Studio album by Ambrosia
- Released: September 11, 1976
- Recorded: 1976
- Studios: Mama Jo's (North Hollywood); Abbey Road (London)
- Genre: Progressive rock
- Label: 20th Century Fox
- Producer: Alan Parsons

Ambrosia chronology
Ambrosia (1975)	Somewhere I've Never Travelled (1976)	Life Beyond L.A. (1978)

Singles from Somewhere I've Never Travelled
- 1. "Can't Let a Woman" Released: 1976; 2. "Runnin' Away" Released: 1976

Somewhere I've Never Travelled is the second album by Ambrosia, and their final album on 20th Century Fox Records, released in 1976. The 1st pressings of the vinyl LP were issued in a custom "pyramid" cover, having 3 fold-out panels that turned the cover into a Pyramid.

The album peaked at #79 on the Billboard 200. None of its singles charted on the Billboard Hot 100.

Professional ratings
Review scores
Source	Rating
AllMusic	4/5 stars
Rolling Stone	(Not Rated)

== Track listing ==
Side one
No.	Title	Writer(s)	Lead vocals	Length
1.	"And..."	Drummond	Drummond	0:47
2.	"Somewhere I've Never Travelled"	Pack, Puerta	Pack, Puerta	4:09
3.	"Cowboy Star"	Drummond, North, Pack, Puerta	Pack, Puerta	6:20
4.	"Runnin' Away"	Pack	Pack	3:27
5.	"Harvey"	Puerta	Puerta	1:27
6.	"I Wanna Know"	Pack, Puerta	Puerta	5:58

Side two
No.	Title	Writer(s)	Lead vocals	Length
7.	"The Brunt"	Drummond, North, Pack, Puerta	Pack, Puerta	5:26
8.	"Danse with Me George (Chopin's Plea)"	Drummond, North, Pack, Puerta	Pack	7:47
9.	"Can't Let a Woman"	Pack	Pack	4:18
10.	"We Need You Too"	Pack, Puerta	Puerta	5:31

== Personnel ==
=== Ambrosia ===
- David Pack – guitars, String Ensemble, Rhodes (8), lead vocals (2–4, 7–9), backing vocals
- Joe Puerta – bass guitar, Moog pedals, guitar (5), lead vocals, backing vocals
- Burleigh Drummond – drums, percussion, bassoon, lead vocals (1), backing vocals
- Christopher North – piano, keyboards, accordion, backing vocals

==== Additional musicians ====
- Ruth Underwood – marimba (8)
- Ian Underwood – saxophone (8)
- Andrew Powell – orchestral arrangements (3, 8, 10)
- Daniel Kobialka – violin

=== Technical ===
- Produced by Alan Parsons
- Executive producer – Freddie Piro
- Engineered by Alan Parsons
- Additional engineering – Tom Trefethen
- Arranged by Ambrosia
- Calligraphy and design – Hogin McMurtrie
- Photography – Ed Caraeff Studio

== Charts ==
Album

Year	Chart	Position
1976	Billboard 200	79
