= Life Beyond L.A. =

Studio album by Ambrosia
- Released: July 26, 1978
- Recorded: 1977–1978
- Studio: Mama Jo's (North Hollywood)
- Genres: Soft rock, art rock, jazz fusion, progressive rock
- Label: Warner Bros. Records
- Producer: Freddie Piro

Ambrosia chronology
Somewhere I've Never Travelled (1976)	Life Beyond L.A. (1978)	One Eighty (1980)

Singles from Life Beyond L.A.
- 1. "How Much I Feel" Released: 1978; 2. "Life Beyond L.A." Released: 1978; 3. "If Heaven Could Find Me" Released: 1978

Professional ratings
Review scores
Source	Rating
AllMusic	2.5/5 stars

Life Beyond L.A. is the third album by Ambrosia, and their first album on Warner Bros. Records, released in 1978. It marked the departure of their progressive rock roots in favor of a more commercial jazz & soft rock sound. "How Much I Feel," "Life Beyond L.A." and "If Heaven Could Find Me" were released as singles. Keyboardist Christopher North briefly left the group during the recording sessions because of personal problems, but rejoined for the tour. Because of this, he is credited as a session musician rather than a member, and did not appear on the album cover.

The album was Ambrosia's most successful, peaking at No. 19 on the Billboard 200. Among the three singles, "How Much I Feel" managed to reach the Top 10, peaking at No. 3 on the Billboard Hot 100, becoming their second Top 40 hit.

== Track listing ==
Side one
No.	Title	Writer(s)	Lead vocals	Length
1.	"Life Beyond L.A."	Drummond, Pack	Pack	4:45
2.	"Art Beware"	Puerta	Puerta	2:15
3.	"Apothecary"	Pack, Puerta	Puerta	4:49
4.	"If Heaven Could Find Me"	Drummond	Puerta	4:28
5.	"How Much I Feel"	Pack	Pack	4:45

Side two
No.	Title	Writer(s)	Lead vocals	Length
6.	"Dancin' by Myself"	Pack	Pack	4:41
7.	"Angola"	Pack, Puerta	Puerta	3:47
8.	"Heart to Heart"	Pack, Puerta	Pack, Puerta	2:46
9.	"Not as You Were"	Drummond, Pack, Puerta	Pack, Puerta	3:49
10.	"Ready for Camarillo"	Puerta	Puerta	4:54

== Personnel ==
=== Ambrosia ===
- David Pack – guitar, piano, keyboards, lead vocals (1, 5, 6, 8, 9), backing vocals, string arrangements (5)
- Joe Puerta – bass, guitars (8), lead vocals (2–4, 7, 10), backing vocals
- Burleigh Drummond – drums, percussion, bassoon, backing vocals

==== Additional musicians ====
- Christopher North – organ (4, 10), piano (10)
- Joe Sample – piano (3, 4)
- David Cutler Lewis – piano (3, 4), Rhodes (6), clavinet (6), Minimoog solo (9)
- Cliff Woolley – harmonica (2)
- Marty Krystall – saxophone (6)
- Daniel Kobialka – violin (8)
- Jimmie Haskell – string arrangements (5)

=== Technical ===
- Produced by Freddie Piro
- Engineered by Tom Trefethen and Stewart Whitmore
- Mixed by Tom Trefethen
- Mix assistant – Stewart Whitmore
- Mastered by Doug Sax at The Mastering Lab (Hollywood, California)
- Arranged by Ambrosia
- Photography and design – Ed Caraeff
- Cover logo – Mike Manoogian
- Modular staging – P.H. Miller

== Charts ==
=== Weekly charts ===
Chart (1978)	Peak position
Canada Top Albums/CDs (RPM)	14
US Billboard 200	19

=== Year-end charts ===
Chart (1978)	Position
Canada Top Albums/CDs (RPM)	97

Singles

Year	Single	Chart	Position
1978	"How Much I Feel"	Billboard Hot 100	3
1978	"How Much I Feel"	Billboard Adult Contemporary	11
1978	"How Much I Feel"	Kent Music Report	30
1978	"How Much I Feel"	Dutch Single Top 100	24
