= Biggest Part of Me =

- Picture sleeve for Italian vinyl single

Single by Ambrosia

from the album One Eighty
- B-side: "Livin' on My Own"
- Released: March 19, 1980
- Genre: Soft rock; yacht rock
- Length: 5:26 (album version); 3:59 (single version)
- Label: Warner Bros.
- Songwriter: David Pack
- Producers: Ambrosia; Freddie Piro

Ambrosia singles chronology
"If Heaven Could Find Me" (1978)	"Biggest Part of Me" (1980)	"You're the Only Woman" (1980)

"Biggest Part of Me" is a song by American band Ambrosia, from the album One Eighty. Released as a single in 1980, the song reached number one on the Radio & Records chart and number 3 on both the US Billboard Hot 100 and Adult Contemporary charts. Cash Box ranked it a notch higher, at #2. It also broke the Top 40 of Billboard's Soul chart. The song was written by band member David Pack.

Pack re-recorded the song for his 2005 album, The Secret of Movin' On.

== Personnel ==
- David Pack – lead vocals, guitars
- Joe Puerta – bass guitar, harmony vocals, backing vocals
- David C. Lewis – Fender Rhodes, acoustic piano, Prophet-5
- Christopher North – Hammond Organ
- Royce Jones – percussion, harmony vocals, backing vocals
- Burleigh Drummond – drums, percussion, harmony vocals, backing vocals
- Ernie Watts – saxophone

== Track listing ==
US 7" single
A. "Biggest Part of Me (edit)" – 3:59
B. "Livin' on My Own" – 4:41

== Chart performance ==
=== Weekly charts ===
Chart (1980)	Peak position
Canadian RPM Top Singles	18
New Zealand (RIANZ)	30
US Billboard Hot 100	3
US Adult Contemporary (Billboard)	3
US Hot R&B/Hip-Hop Songs (Billboard)	35
Radio & Records	1

=== Year-end charts ===
Chart (1980)	Position
US Billboard Hot 100	27
US Cash Box Top 100	25

== Certifications ==
Region	Certification	Certified units/sales
United States (RIAA)	Gold	500,000^{‡}
^{‡} Sales+streaming figures based on certification alone.
