= Ken Stacey =

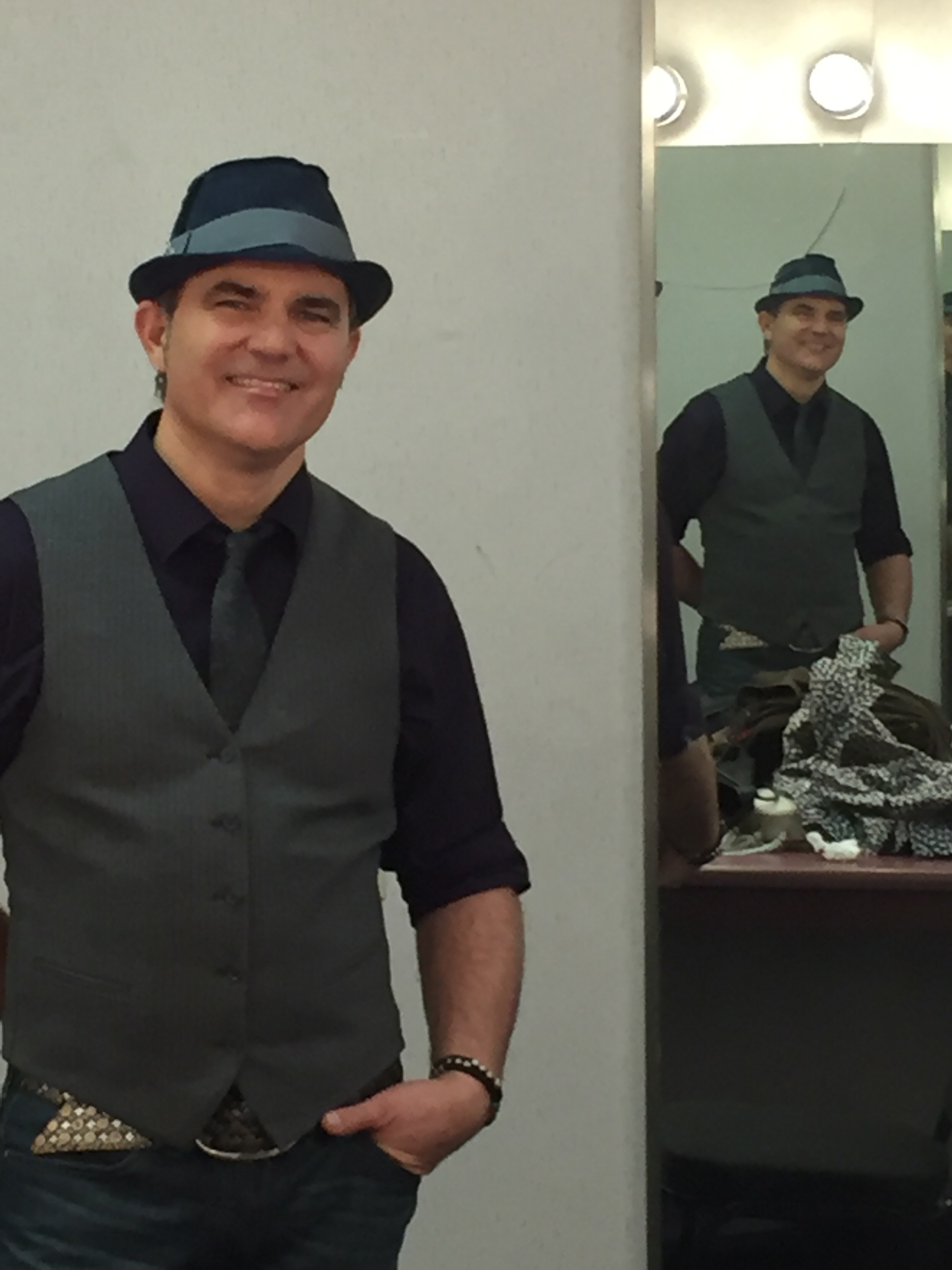
- Stacey backstage in 2016

Background information
- Born: Los Angeles, California, United States
- Genres: Pop; rock; progressive rock
- Occupations: Singer; songwriter; composer; guitarist
- Instruments: Vocals; guitar
- Years active: 1982–present
- Formerly of: Ambrosia
- Website: http://www.kenstacey.com

Ken Stacey (born in Los Angeles, California) is an American singer, guitarist and songwriter.

Stacey has worked with Michael Jackson, Phil Collins, Johnny Hallyday, Natalie Jackson, Richard Marx, and Phil Ramone, among many others. One of his biggest highlights was singing backing vocals and playing acoustic guitar on occasional songs at Elton John's 2000 One Night Only concert in Madison Square Garden, subsequently released as an album. His vocal work has appeared in various commercials for companies including McDonald's, Dodge, Coors, Toyota, and Ralphs. Stacey's singing voice reaches an extreme upper range.

In 2005 Stacey began performing in the rock band Ambrosia, and from 2014 to 2020 was a full-time member, in touring, recording and composing with the group. He left Ambrosia in 2020.

== See also ==
- Ambrosia website
