= I Just Can't Let Go =

Single by David Pack

from the album Anywhere You Go
- B-side: "Do Ya"
- Released: September 1986
- Genre: Soft rock
- Length: 4:39 (Single Version); 4:54 (Album Version)
- Label: Warner Bros.
- Songwriter: David Pack
- Producers: David Pack; Michael Verdick; Lenny Waronker; Michael Ostin

David Pack singles chronology
"Prove Me Wrong" (1986)	"I Just Can't Let Go" (1986)

"I Just Can't Let Go" is a song by David Pack, featuring Michael McDonald and James Ingram. It was released as a single in 1986 and was the third of three charting singles released from Pack's debut solo album, Anywhere You Go.

The song reached No. 13 on the U.S. Billboard Adult Contemporary chart during the fall of 1986. It spent 11 weeks on the chart. The song describes the estrangement of a lying lover to whom the singer had given his "heart and soul," yet still constantly remembering the love they lost, wondering if the guilty one is feeling the same, and leaving the door open for reconciliation.

"I Just Can't Let Go" was re-recorded in 1996 by Pack's band prior to his solo career, Ambrosia (who had reunited - with Pack - in 1989) for their 1997 Anthology compilation. It was released as a single that year and reached No. 26 on the Adult Contemporary chart. This version was re-arranged and produced by Pack, Oliver Leiber, and Shaun LaBelle, as a bonus track. The original vocals were kept, but Pack and McDonald added new vocal improvisation, while the sax solo was added by Everette Harp.

In 2019, Pack re-mixed and re-mastered the original 1985 recording of this song to create a new video. The demo vocals of Ingram, McDonald, and Pack were restored, digitized, and then used as an a cappella intro of the video. The video was made after Pack found out that fans had created hundreds of videos of this song. Pack was inspired then to create his own video, and dedicate it to Ingram.

== Chart performance ==
=== David Pack version ===
Chart (1986)	Peak position
U.S. Billboard Adult Contemporary	13

=== Ambrosia version ===
Chart (1997)	Peak position
U.S. Billboard Adult Contemporary	26

== Other versions ==
- Patti Austin covered the song for her 1991 album Carry On.
- A popular song in the Philippines, it has been covered by several local singers including Jed Madela, Rachelle Ann Go and Jaya.
