= Doug Jackson (musician) =

American guitarist, singer and educator

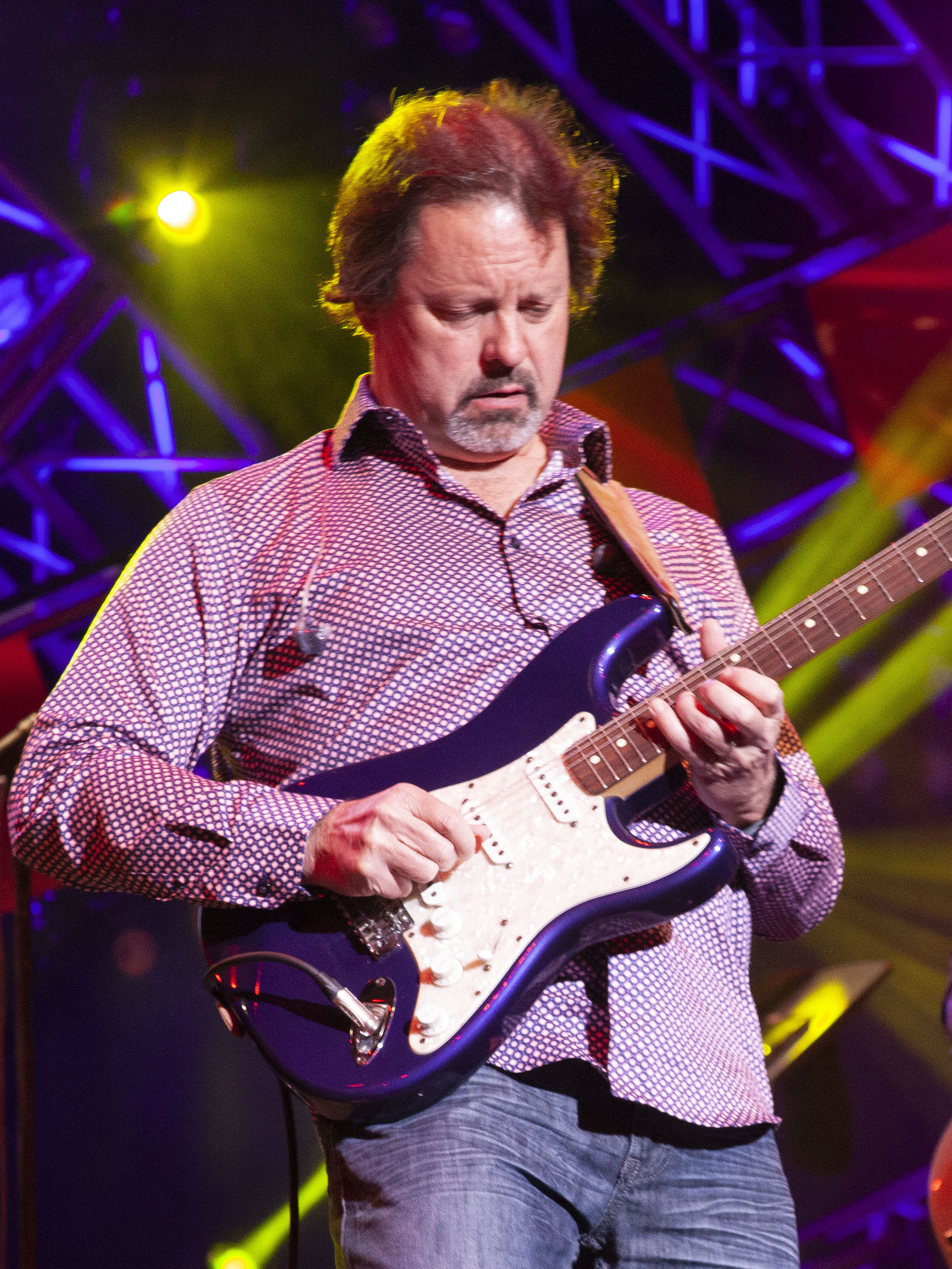
- Jackson in concert with Ambrosia in 2019

Background information
- Born: Dallas, Texas
- Genres: Progressive rock, pop rock
- Instrument: Guitarist
- Years active: 1976–present
- Label: Sony/BMG
- Member of: Ambrosia
- Website: http://www.dougjacksonguitar.com

Doug Jackson is an American musician and educator. He is currently guitarist for the five-time Grammy Award nominated band Ambrosia. Jackson has released two solo albums, most recently in 2016.

== Childhood ==
Born in Texas, Jackson grew up in Evergreen, Colorado. He started playing guitar at age 6. He attended the Berklee College of Music.

== Music career ==
=== As performer ===
Jackson recorded with Roberto Carlos on several recordings in the early 1990s. He released his first solo album, Storm Chaser to good reviews in 1995.

He has performed onstage with numerous notable musicians, including Kenny Loggins, Gary Wright and Al Stewart.

Currently, a member of the band Ambrosia, Jackson tours widely with the group, which he joined in 2000. His second solo album, The Performance, was released in 2016.

=== As educator ===
Doug Jackson is a faculty member of the Conservatory of Music at Biola University in Southern California, having been named to the position in 2002.

=== As endorser ===
Jackson is a current endorser of Reunion Blues music instrument cases and "gig bags." He is a past endorser of Fender Guitars.
