= Holdin' on to Yesterday =

"Holdin' On to Yesterday"

Single by Ambrosia

from the album Ambrosia
- B-side: "Make Us All Aware"
- Released: June 1975
- Recorded: 1974
- Genre: Soft rock; progressive rock; space rock
- Length: 4:19
- Label: 20th Century Fox
- Songwriter(s): David Pack, Joe Puerta
- Producer(s): Freddie Piro

Ambrosia singles chronology
| "Holdin' On to Yesterday" (1975) | "Nice, Nice, Very Nice" (1975) |

"Holdin' On to Yesterday" is the debut single by American rock band Ambrosia. It was written by David Pack and Joe Puerta.

== Chart performance ==
The song was released in the spring of 1975 as the lead single from their eponymous debut album, peaking at No. 17 on the U.S. Billboard Hot 100. It was also a top 40 hit in Canada and New Zealand.

| Chart (1975) | Peak position |
|---|---|
| US Adult Contemporary (Billboard) | 46 |
| US Billboard Hot 100 | 17 |
| US Cash Box Top 100 | 18 |
| Canada RPM Top Singles | 37 |
| New Zealand (RIANZ) | 36 |
| Netherlands (NED) | 36 |

== Personnel ==
- David Pack - lead vocal, guitar
- Christopher North - organ, pianos, backing vocal
- Joe Puerta - bass, backing vocal
- Burleigh Drummond - drums, backing vocal
- Daniel Kobialka - violin
