= Royce Jones =

American singer (born 1954)

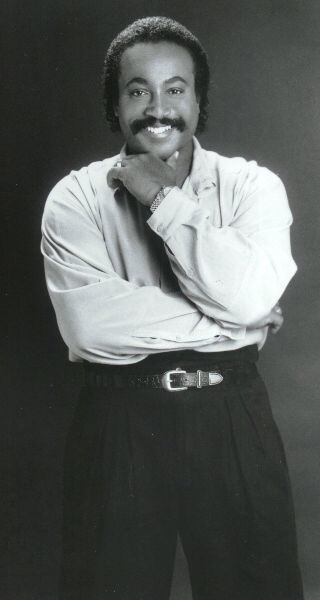
- Jones in the 1970s

Background information
- Born: December 15, 1954 (age 71); Los Angeles, California
- Genres: Rock, R&B
- Instrument: Percussion
- Years active: 1964–present
- Formerly of: Ambrosia, Steely Dan

Royce Jones (born December 15, 1954) is an American musician best known for his work as a backing vocalist with the bands Steely Dan (in 1973) and Ambrosia (from 1978 to 1982). In the studio, Jones contributed vocals to Ambrosia's David Pack's Anywhere You Go, one song on Steely Dan's Countdown to Ecstasy, Bruzer's Round 1 and Stephan Cohn's self-titled release.

Jones also served as a percussionist and lead vocalist for Steely Dan's touring band from 1973 to 1974, singing lead on the songs "Dirty Work", "Brooklyn (Owes the Charmer Under Me)", "Change of the Guard", "Bodhisattva", and "Any Major Dude Will Tell You".

In the summer of 2007, Jones joined a cover band called Screamin Lehman Band. The group's official site says they cover the songs of "Boz Scaggs, The Cars, Steely Dan, Stevie Winwood, and Elvin Bishop".

Royce Jones is now in The Royce Jones band, also formally a member of eight piece horn band called "Stonebridge". He also worked with The Platters. Royce was the lead singer of Odyssey (Motown).

Royce Jones also performed on Richard Simmons' Sweatin To The Oldies 3 & 4 videos.

In 2011 - 2012 he worked with the Tim Weisberg Band, Chuck Alvarez and Paul Turner.
