= How Much I Feel =

Single by Ambrosia

from the album Life Beyond L.A.
- B-side: "Ready for Camarillo"
- Released: August 1978
- Recorded: 1978
- Genre: Soft rock; pop
- Length: 4:46
- Label: Warner Bros. 8640
- Songwriter: David Pack
- Producers: Freddie Piro; Ambrosia

Ambrosia singles chronology
"Magical Mystery Tour" (1977)	"How Much I Feel" (1978)	"Life Beyond L.A." (1978)

Music video
- "How Much I Feel" by Ambrosia on YouTube

"How Much I Feel" is a 1978 song by American rock band Ambrosia. The song, written by the band's guitarist/vocalist David Pack, was released in the summer of 1978 as the lead single from their third album, Life Beyond L.A., peaking at position three on the Billboard Hot 100 chart and number two for three weeks on the Cash Box Top 100.

== Personnel ==
- David Pack – lead and backing vocals, guitars, acoustic piano, synthesizers, string arrangements
- Joe Puerta – bass, backing vocals
- Burleigh Drummond – drums, percussion, backing vocals
- Jimmie Haskell – string arrangements

== Chart performance ==
=== Weekly singles charts ===
Chart (1978–1979)	Peak position
Australia	30
Canada Adult Contemporary (RPM)	6
Canada Top Singles (RPM)	2
Netherlands (NED)	24
New Zealand (RIANZ)	24
US Adult Contemporary (Billboard)	11
US Billboard Hot 100	3
US Cash Box Top 100	2

=== Year-end charts ===
Chart (1978)	Position
Canada	43
US Cash Box	35

Chart (1979)	Position
US Billboard Hot 100	84

== Certifications ==
Region	Certification	Certified units/sales
United States (RIAA)	Gold	500,000^{‡}
^{‡} Sales+streaming figures based on certification alone.

== Covers and sampling ==
"How Much I Feel" was covered by English duo Alibi; it reached No. 58 on the UK Singles Chart in early 1998.

It was sampled in the song "All Your Fault" by Big Sean featuring Kanye West, the third track on the 2015 album Dark Sky Paradise. The song was also featured on Keith Urban's 2026 album, Flow State.
