= Ambrosia (band) =

American rock band

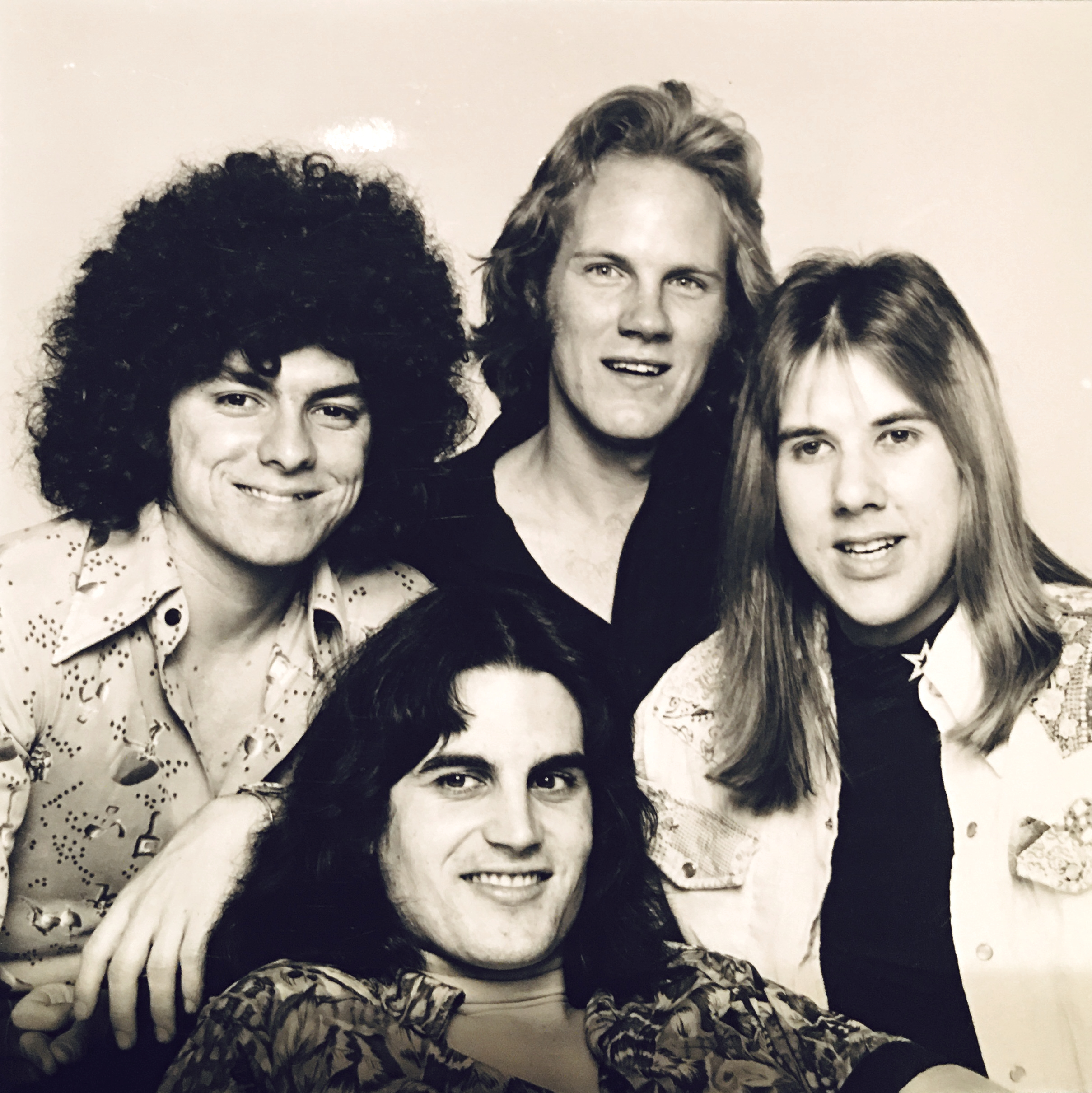
- Founding members of Ambrosia in 1975; From left to right: Joe Puerta, Burleigh Drummond, David Pack. Bottom: Christopher North

Background information
- Also known as: Ambergris, Ambergris Mite
- Origin: Los Angeles, California, U.S.
- Genres: Progressive pop; yacht rock; jazz fusion; blue-eyed soul
- Years active: 1970–1982, 1989–present
- Labels: 20th Century Fox; Warner Bros.; Collectables
- Members: Joe Puerta; Burleigh Drummond; Shem von Schroeck; Doug Jackson; Mary Harris
- Past members: Christopher North; David Pack; Rick Cowling; David C. Lewis; Royce Jones; Bruce Hornsby; Cliff Woolley; Tollak Ollestad; Robert Berry; Ken Stacey; Kipp Lennon
- Website: ambrosialive.net

Ambrosia is an American rock band formed in Los Angeles in 1970. Ambrosia had five top 40 hit singles released between 1975 and 1980, including the top 5 hits "How Much I Feel" and "Biggest Part of Me", and top 20 hits "You're the Only Woman (You & I)" and "Holdin' on to Yesterday". In 1989, the group's original lineup reunited, and following the departure of guitarist and frontman David Pack in 2000, the group has been augmented by various singers and led by fellow founders Joe Puerta (bass/vocals) and drummer Burleigh Drummond. Original keyboardist Christopher North also performed with Ambrosia until his death in 2026.

Ambrosia currently tours internationally and has worked in the past and present with Alan Parsons, Bruce Hornsby, Bill Champlin, Michael McDonald and Peter Beckett, among other notable artists.

== Formation ==
The group was founded as a quartet with guitarist/vocalist David Pack, bassist/vocalist Joe Puerta, keyboardist Christopher North and drummer Burleigh Drummond. According to Joe Puerta, their original name was "Ambergris Mite," but after doing some touring they discovered there was already a band using the name "Ambergris," so they turned to the dictionary and picked the name "Ambrosia" because a name meaning "nectar of the gods" seemed fitting. While Ambrosia had several radio hits in the 1970s, much of the material on their five albums is progressive in nature.

The founding constituents of Ambrosia were reared in Southern California's South Bay, later adopting San Pedro as their hometown. Their initial musical influences, like many of their generation, came from the Beach Boys, Jimmy Reed, King Crimson and the Beatles. Ambrosia fused symphonic art rock with a slickly produced pop sound, resulting in a "melodic prog" style.

Early on, the band was infatuated with Crosby, Stills, Nash, & Young and began to experiment with vocal harmonies.

The musicians, inspired by the music and artists of the progressive rock era, acquired a significant regional admiration. In 1971, a friend who was doing sound for the Hollywood Bowl, invited them to play there on stage to test a new sound system that had been installed. The head engineer in charge at the Bowl was so impressed with the group that he invited them back to attend performances by the Los Angeles Philharmonic. He introduced them to conductor Zubin Mehta, who featured Ambrosia as part of a so-called All-American Dream Concert.

== Rise to fame ==
Ambrosia auditioned for Herb Alpert and A&M Records early in their history, but were signed by 20th Century Fox Records in 1975, who released two albums by the group.

Their first album, Ambrosia, produced by Freddie Piro, was released in February 1975. It spawned the top 20 chart single "Holdin' On to Yesterday", as well as "Nice, Nice, Very Nice". The latter sets to music a poem in Kurt Vonnegut's Cat's Cradle. The album was nominated for a Grammy Award for Best Engineered Recording (other than Classical). Alan Parsons was the engineer for Ambrosia's first album and the producer for their second. All four members of Ambrosia played on the first Alan Parsons Project album, Tales of Mystery and Imagination, which was recorded soon after Ambrosia's first album. David Pack later appeared on the Alan Parsons album Try Anything Once (1993), co-writing, playing, and providing vocals on three songs.

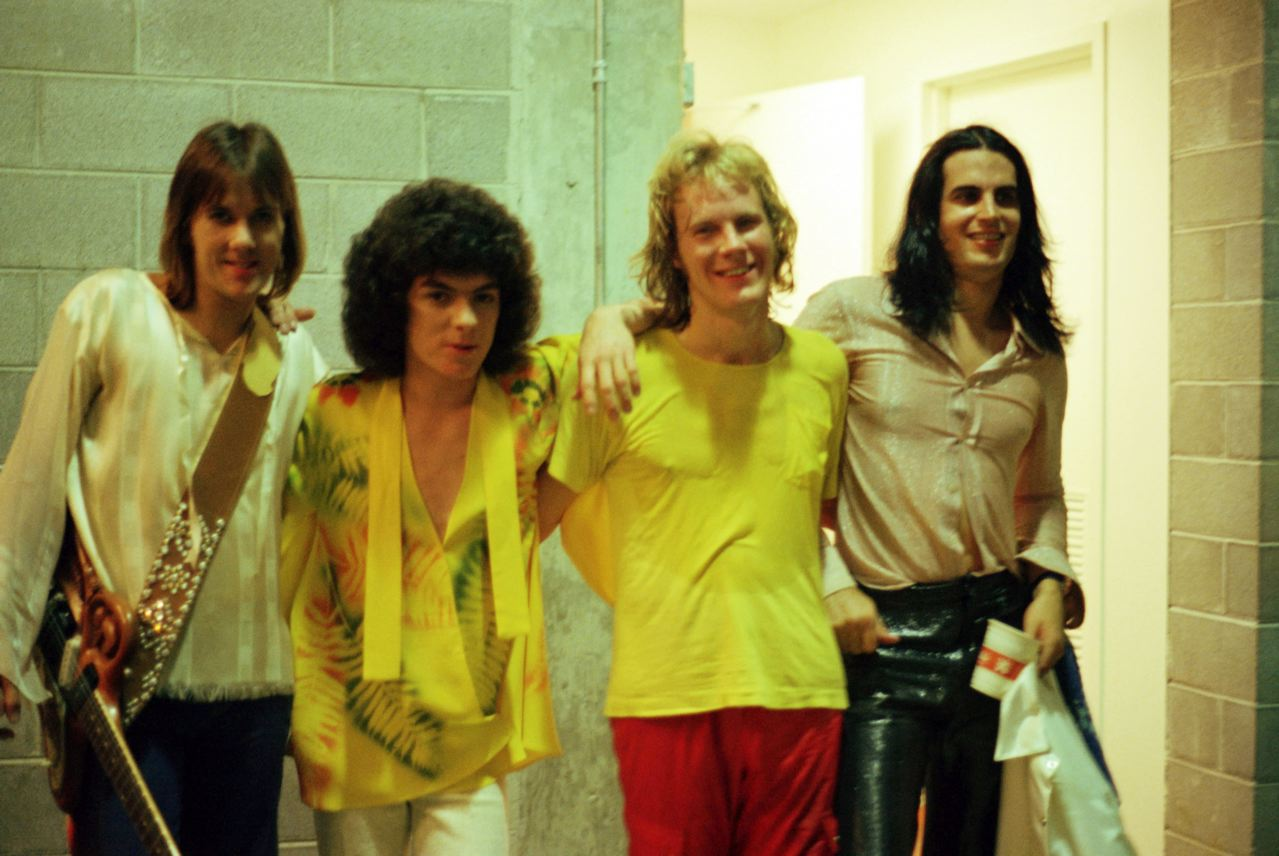
Ambrosia backstage in the 1970s. L to R: David Pack, Joe Puerta, Burleigh Drummond, Christopher North

After lengthy touring, the band recorded Somewhere I've Never Travelled, produced by Alan Parsons and released in September 1976. The album yielded the title song and the single "Can't Let a Woman", which both became FM favorites and feature lush orchestration and vocal arrangements. The record sleeve folded into a large pyramid. Somewhere I've Never Travelled received a Grammy nomination and set the stage for the band's signing to Warner Bros. Records.

In 1976 the group recorded the Beatles song "Magical Mystery Tour", for the transitory musical documentary, All This and World War II (November 1976). The film's soundtrack consisted of different artists providing arrangements of Beatles songs. Their version of "Magical Mystery Tour" scored a top 40 hit, and has since been a staple of their live shows.

In August 1978 Life Beyond L.A. was released. It marked a move away from their lush arrangements and introduced a more raw, aggressive jazz/R&B influence. Christopher North, who had family obligations and was not totally happy with the group's shift away from the sound of the first two albums, had left the group in 1977 during the album's recording.

The year 1978 marked their biggest pop breakthrough with their first Gold single "How Much I Feel" from the album, which was a No. 3 hit on the Billboard Hot 100. Warner Bros advertised the title cut for radio and Life Beyond L.A. started to get significant airplay on radio stations a few months after the album's release. Extensive touring with Fleetwood Mac, Heart and the Doobie Brothers, in addition to major headlining shows, cemented Ambrosia's reputation as a live act.

For the band's 1978-79 tour, North returned and the group added a second keyboardist, David C. Lewis, as well as an additional singer, Royce Jones, who joined in late 1978.

In April 1980 Warner Bros. released One Eighty, which produced two of the year's biggest hits. The first, "Biggest Part of Me", reached number three for three weeks on the Billboard Hot 100, and crossed over to the soul chart, where it peaked at number thirty-five. The second, another blue-eyed soul hit, "You're the Only Woman (You & I)", reached No. 13 on the Billboard Hot 100. One Eighty earned the band three Grammy nominations, including Best Pop Vocal Group. A headlining world tour followed. For the Japanese leg of the tour, the group was joined by their longtime friend Cliff Woolley (formerly of The Association, who had also guested on Life Beyond L.A.) on guitar, harmonica and backup vocals.

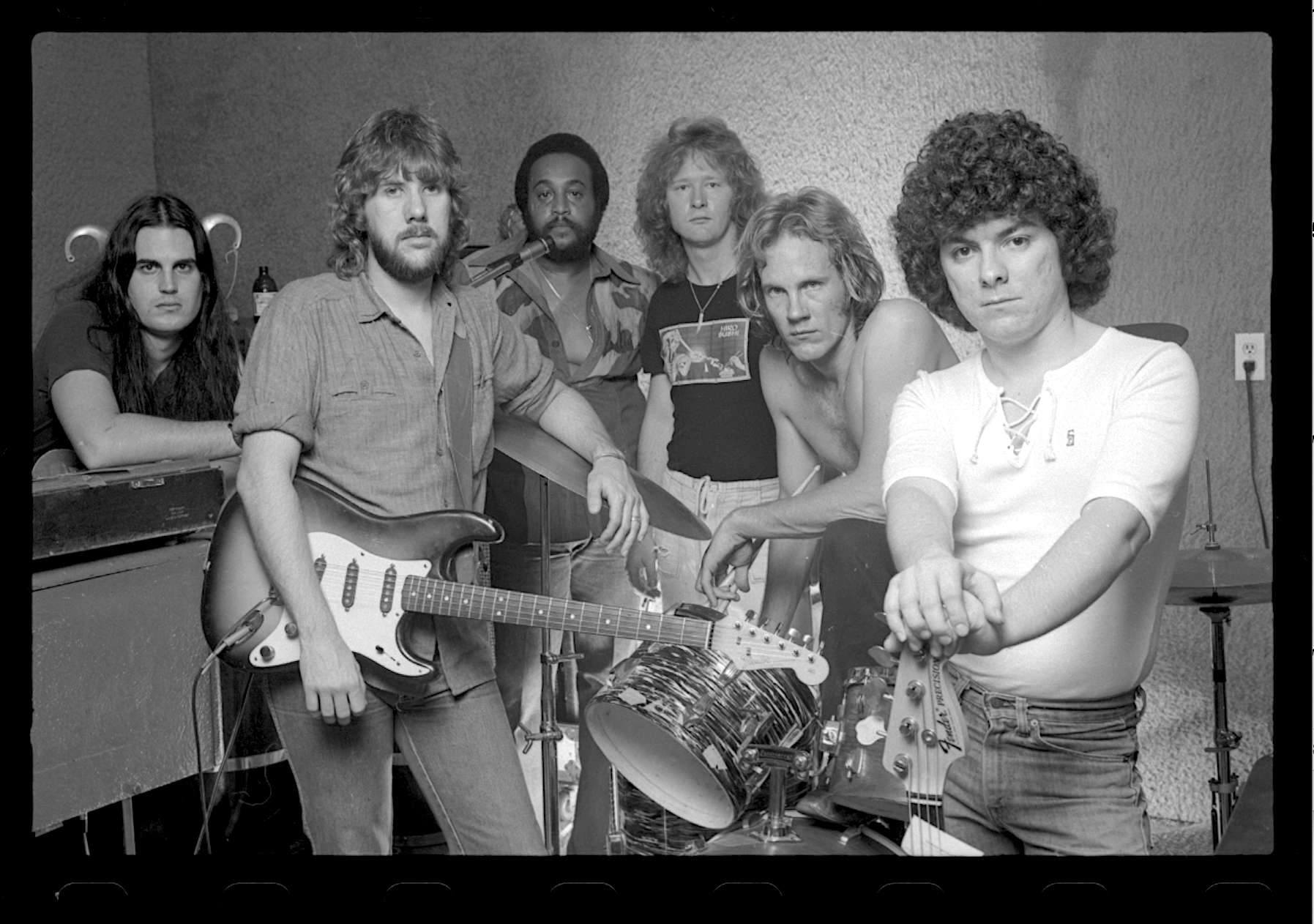
Ambrosia in 1980. L to R: Christopher North, David Pack, Royce Jones, David C. Lewis, Burleigh Drummond, Joe Puerta

The title of the album One Eighty was believed by fans to signal the group's "180-degree" change in direction.

Also in 1980, the band contributed the song "Outside" to the film Inside Moves, and "Feels So Good to Win" appeared in the film Coast to Coast later that same year. The following year they placed another track, "Poor Rich Boy" (written by Burt Bacharach), on the soundtrack of the film, Arthur.

In 1982 David C. Lewis briefly left the touring group to be replaced by Bruce Hornsby, four years before his own rise to stardom. The same year, Ambrosia released their fifth and final studio album, Road Island (May 1982), their first effort without the assistance of Freddie Piro's production company. Produced by James Guthrie, the album consisted of intense, driving hard rock (outside of the soft ballad "Feeling Alive Again" and the progressive rock closer "Endings"). Though it received some airplay with "How Can You Love Me", the album was a commercial disappointment. The band then broke up afterwards, ending their run of chart success.

== Later years ==
After Ambrosia, David Pack pursued a solo career and produced or worked with many top artists. Pack's 1985 solo album, Anywhere You Go, included the song "Prove Me Wrong", which also appeared on the soundtrack of the 1985 film White Nights. Joe Puerta became a founding member of Bruce Hornsby and the Range.

In 1989 Ambrosia reunited with all four original members and began playing live shows again, mostly on the West Coast. They expanded their touring ranks once again with Tollak Ollestad (vocals, keyboards, harmonica) and Shem von Schroeck (vocals, keyboards, percussion, bass, guitar).

In 1995 the band expanded their annual touring schedule. Pack had a conflict and guitarist John DeFaria filled in for him. Bernie Chiaravalle likewise stepped in during the summer of 1997 and Mike Keneally did the honors in 1998 and 2000 for the concerts Pack was unable to play. Brian Stiemke subbed for an ill Burleigh Drummond for a few shows in 1997.

In May 1997 Warner Bros. released Ambrosia's greatest hits CD Anthology, which contained tracks from all five albums plus three new tracks. In addition to Anthology, the entire Ambrosia catalog was remastered and released on CD.

The band launched a 30th anniversary tour in 2000. And early the following year, it was announced that Pack had permanently left the band and he was replaced by Doug Jackson, who had filled in for him for some shows the previous year. Pack's final show with the band was on November 4, 2000, in Chandler, Arizona. Jackson was in place on guitar for their 2001 shows, except for one gig at Stone Mountain Park in Georgia on August 25 where Steve Farris (from Mr. Mister) subbed for him.

Ricky Cosentino filled in for Shem for some concerts in 1998, 1999, 2000 and 2003. Shem then left in 2003 to join Kenny Loggins' band. Robert Berry (vocals, guitars), formerly of 3 and GTR, joined temporarily in 2004–2005, and singer/guitarist Ken Stacey became a member in 2005. Shem then returned and he and Stacey alternated with the group for a while.

Tollak Ollestad left in late 2004 to concentrate on a solo career and relocate to the Netherlands where he has had success. David C. Lewis then returned, after having substituted for Ollestad on some 1999 and 2003 gigs. Ollestad remained on call to sub for various band members and came back to play with Ambrosia's spring 2009 tour in place of Lewis and Shem.

Later in 2009, Rick Cowling (formerly with Kenny Loggins) came in on vocals, guitar and keyboards, though Ollestad still appeared with the band from time to time, most recently in 2010 when Doug Jackson was out playing guitar for Gary Wright, and again while Cowling moved over to lead guitar until Jackson's return later in the year.

== Current era ==
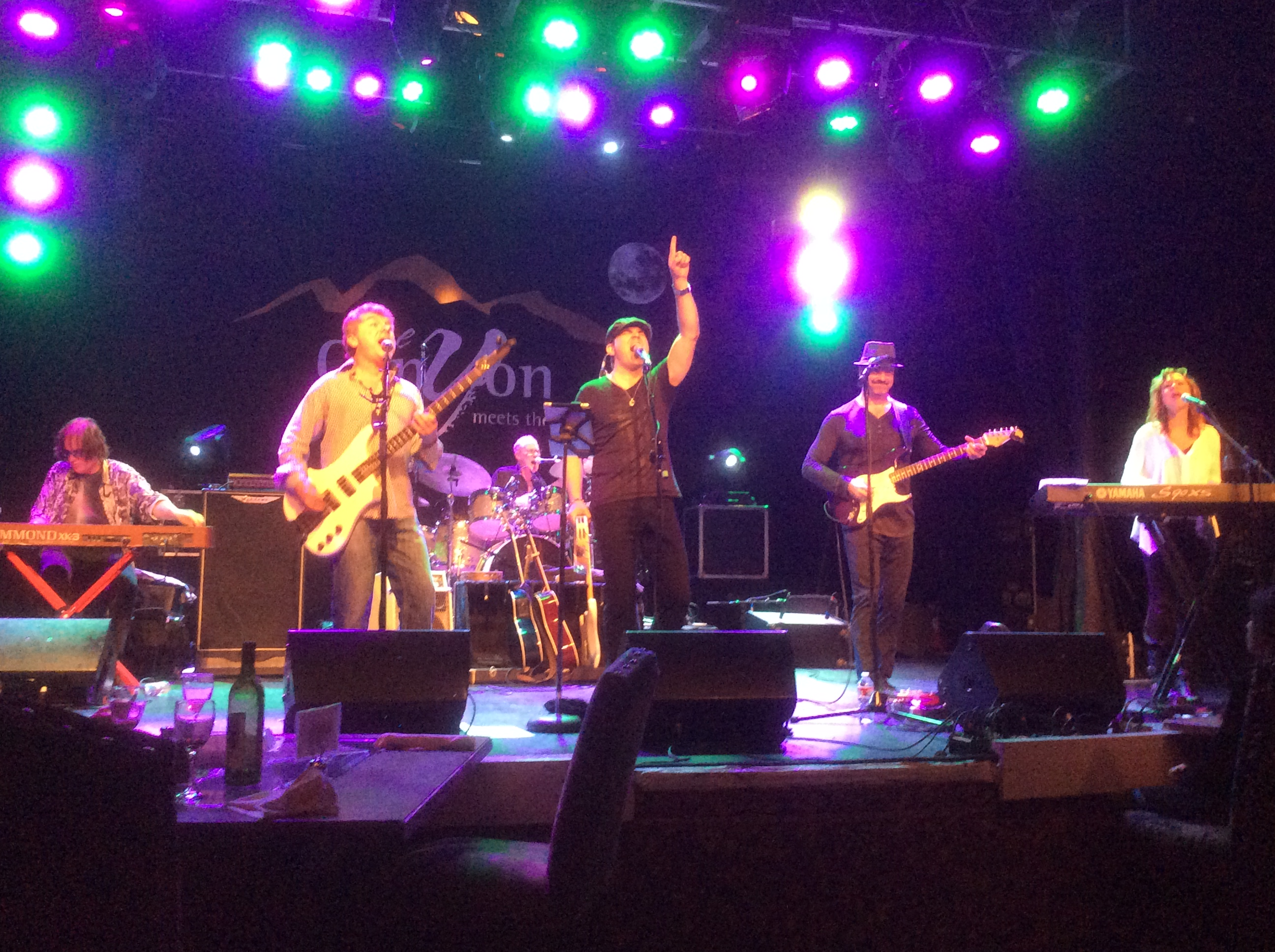
Ambrosia in concert on May 24, 2014. L to R: Christopher North, Joe Puerta, Burleigh Drummond, Ken Stacey, Doug Jackson, and Mary Harris

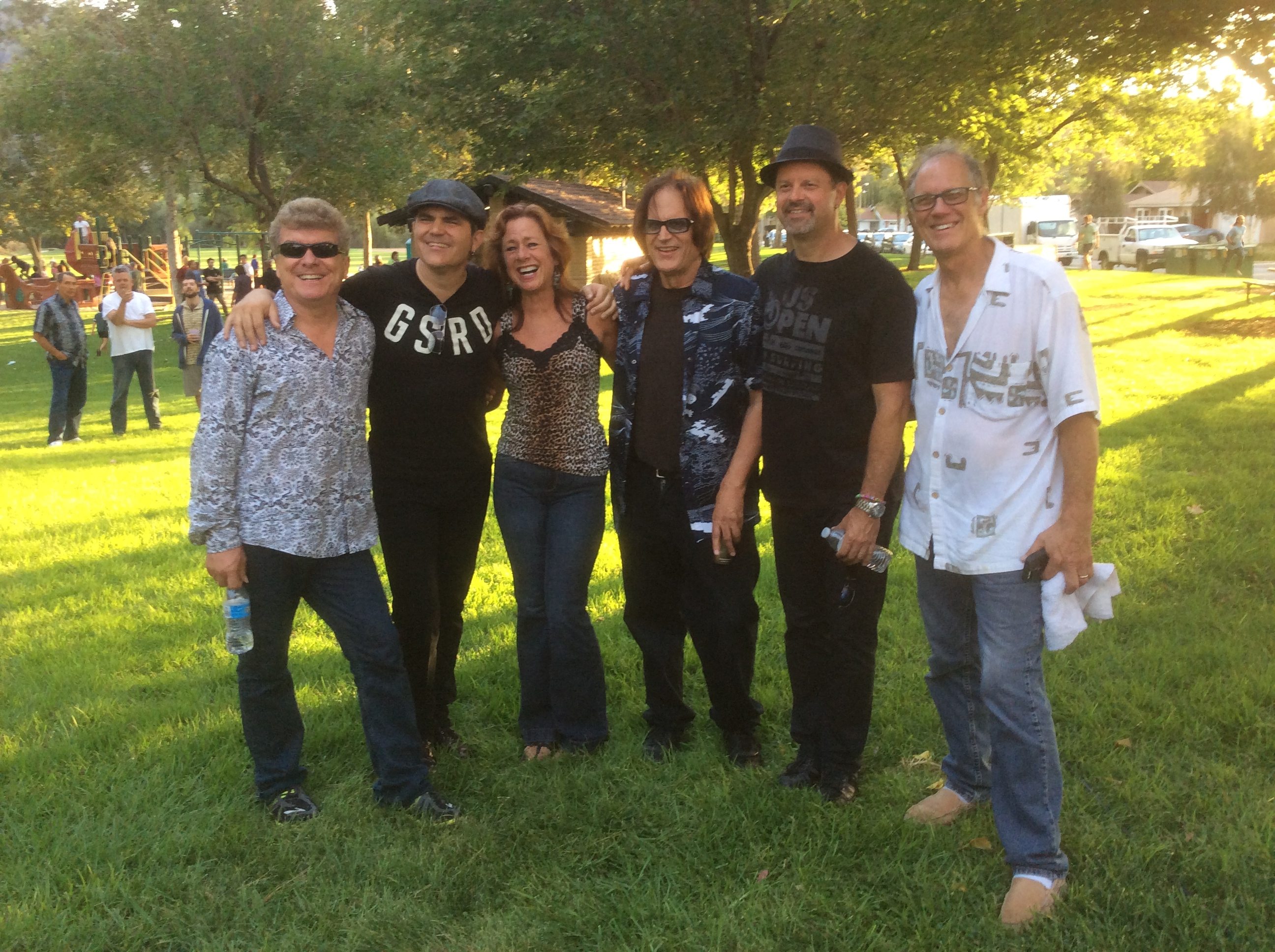
Ambrosia between sets at an outdoor concert in Agoura Hills, California on August 3, 2014. L to R: Joe Puerta, Ken Stacey, Mary Harris, Christopher North, Doug Jackson, Burleigh Drummond

Ambrosia appeared on the May 2, 2011 episode of Late Night with Jimmy Fallon as part of the host's "Yacht Rock 2k11" theme show, performing "Biggest Part of Me" (during the show) and "How Much I Feel" (after the formal taping, but put up on the Fallon website).

In 2012 Burleigh Drummond's wife Mary Harris, after filling in on a show or two since 2000, became a permanent band member on keyboards and vocals. Harris is also a vocal arranger and songwriter, who has co-written new material for Ambrosia performed onstage. She has previously worked in varied capacities with Pink Floyd, XTC, Stanley Clarke and for many years with Jimmy Buffett.

Ken Stacey rejoined in 2014 after Rick Cowling departed. Ambrosia's six-person lineup was then stable for a while and the group continued to tour, sometimes combining their talents with other artists, including Bill Champlin, Peter Beckett, Michael McDonald, Edgar Winter, Dave Mason, Gary Wright, Al Stewart and others.

Ambrosia's live performances showcase both their legacy hit material and more recent songs. Kipp Lennon (from the Venice, California band Venice) joined on lead vocals to start the 2021 tour as the band began their post lockdown era, Ken Stacey having exited during their downtime in 2020.

Former keyboardist for the band, David Cutler Lewis, died of brain cancer on June 7, 2021.

Former member Shem von Schroeck returned in the fall of 2022, this time on drums, to sub for Drummond, who was recovering from back surgery. Shem likewise returned in 2024 to stand in for Christopher North on keyboards as he underwent treatment for throat cancer. After Shem's return, Kipp Lennon returned full-time to his other band Venice.

North, while recovering from his treatment, was accidentally hit by a car outside a deli in Santa Monica in 2025. He died on March 30, 2026 in a hospice after a recurrence of his cancer.

=== Live and alumni albums ===
On September 1, 2001 the band recorded a live album at the Galaxy Theater in Santa Ana, California without David Pack. This album, Live, was released in May 2002. Also, in 2003, Collectables Records released another compilation album, How Much I Feel and Other Hits.

David Pack released two 2005 solo projects: Unborn, a compilation of older unreleased material, and the more up-to-date The Secret of Movin' On featuring collaborations with Timothy B. Schmit of Eagles fame, former Journey vocalist Steve Perry, Heart vocalist Ann Wilson and America co-founder Dewey Bunnell, amongst others. Both albums follow in Pack's later era style of smooth pop-rock.

=== Member solo projects ===
Several members have established careers outside of Ambrosia.

- Joe Puerta has started a studio near his suburban Milwaukee home, The Exchange, where he's produced several artists including Les Lokey, Big Nick & the Cydecos, Alaria Taylor and The Good Luck Joes.
- Burleigh Drummond drummed for roots CCM supergroup Lost Dogs for several albums. He and wife Mary Harris co-founded their own group, Tin Drum, which has released three albums with various backing musicians, and in 2024 the Tin Drum Family Band which includes their daughter Sierra Drummond and son Burleigh Drummond IV. Tin Drum is also a production company with such varied artists on their roster as bluesman Mighty Mo Rodgers and kids-oriented gospel act Kingdom Bound.
- Doug Jackson released his second solo album in 2016.
- David Pack joined childhood friend and former bandmate Fred Beato to form Beato Band.

== Band members ==
=== Current ===
Image	Name	Years active	Instruments	Release contributions
	Joe Puerta	1970–1982; 1989–present	bass; lead and backing vocals; guitar	all releases
	Burleigh Drummond	1970–1982; 1989–present	drums; backing and occasional lead vocals; percussion; bassoon	all releases
	Shem von Schroeck	1989–2003; 2005–2009; 2022; 2024–present	lead and backing vocals; keyboards; percussion; guitar; bass; drums	Live at The Galaxy (2002); Standing Room Only (2007)
	Doug Jackson	2000–present	guitar; backing vocals	Live at The Galaxy (2002); Standing Room Only (2007)
	Mary Harris	2012–present	keyboards; backing and occasional lead vocals	none to date

=== Former ===
Image	Name	Years active	Instruments	Release contributions
	David Pack	1970–1982; 1989–2000	guitars; lead and backing vocals; keyboards	all releases until Anthology (1997)
	Christopher North	1970–1977; 1978–1982; 1989–2026 (until his death)	keyboards; backing vocals	all releases to date
	David C. Lewis	1978–1982; 2005–2009 (died 2021)	keyboards	Life Beyond L.A. (1978); One Eighty (1980); Road Island (1982)
	Royce Jones	1978–1982	backing and lead vocals; percussion	One Eighty (1980); Road Island (1982)
	Bruce Hornsby	1982	keyboards; backing vocals	none
	Tollak Ollestad	1989–2004	keyboards; backing and lead vocals; harmonica	Live at The Galaxy (2002); Standing Room Only (2007)
	Robert Berry	2004–2005	lead and backing vocals; guitar	none
	Ken Stacey	2005–2009; 2014–2020	lead and backing vocals; percussion; guitar	none
	Rick Cowling	2009–2013	lead and backing vocals; keyboards; guitar	none
	Kipp Lennon	2021–2024	lead and backing vocals; percussion	none

== Discography ==
=== Studio albums ===
- Ambrosia (1975)
- Somewhere I've Never Travelled (1976)
- Life Beyond L.A. (1978)
- One Eighty (1980)
- Road Island (1982)
