= You're the Only Woman (You & I) =

Single by Ambrosia

from the album One Eighty
- B-side: "Shape I'm In"
- Released: July 1980
- Genre: Soft rock
- Length: 4:20 (Album and commercial 7" version); 4:05 (Promo 7" edit)
- Label: Warner Bros.
- Songwriter: David Pack
- Producers: Ambrosia, Freddie Piro

Ambrosia singles chronology
"Biggest Part of Me" (1980)	"You're the Only Woman (You & I)" (1980)	"How Can You Love Me" (1982)

"You're the Only Woman (You & I)" is a song by American soft rock band Ambrosia, released in 1980 as the second single from the album One Eighty.

The song was their fifth and final U.S. top 40 hit, peaking at No. 13 on the U.S. Billboard Hot 100 and No. 5 on the Adult Contemporary chart during late summer/early fall of 1980.

== Track listing ==
U.S. 7-inch single
A. "You're the Only Woman (You & I)" - 4:20
B. "Shape I'm In" - 3:29

== Chart performance ==
Chart (1980)	Peak position
Canadian RPM Top Singles	15
Canadian RPM Adult Contemporary	42
US Billboard Hot 100	13
US Adult Contemporary (Billboard)	5
U.S. Cash Box Top 100	17

== Certifications ==
Region	Certification	Certified units/sales
United States (RIAA)	Gold	500,000^{‡}
^{‡} Sales+streaming figures based on certification alone.

== Other versions ==
Brat Pack released a cover version on their 1990 self-titled album, peaking at No. 36 on the Billboard Hot 100, and No. 90 in Canada. Ambrosia band member David Pack, who wrote the song, re-recorded it for his 2005 solo album The Secret of Movin' On.
