= David Pack =

American musician and singer (born 1952)

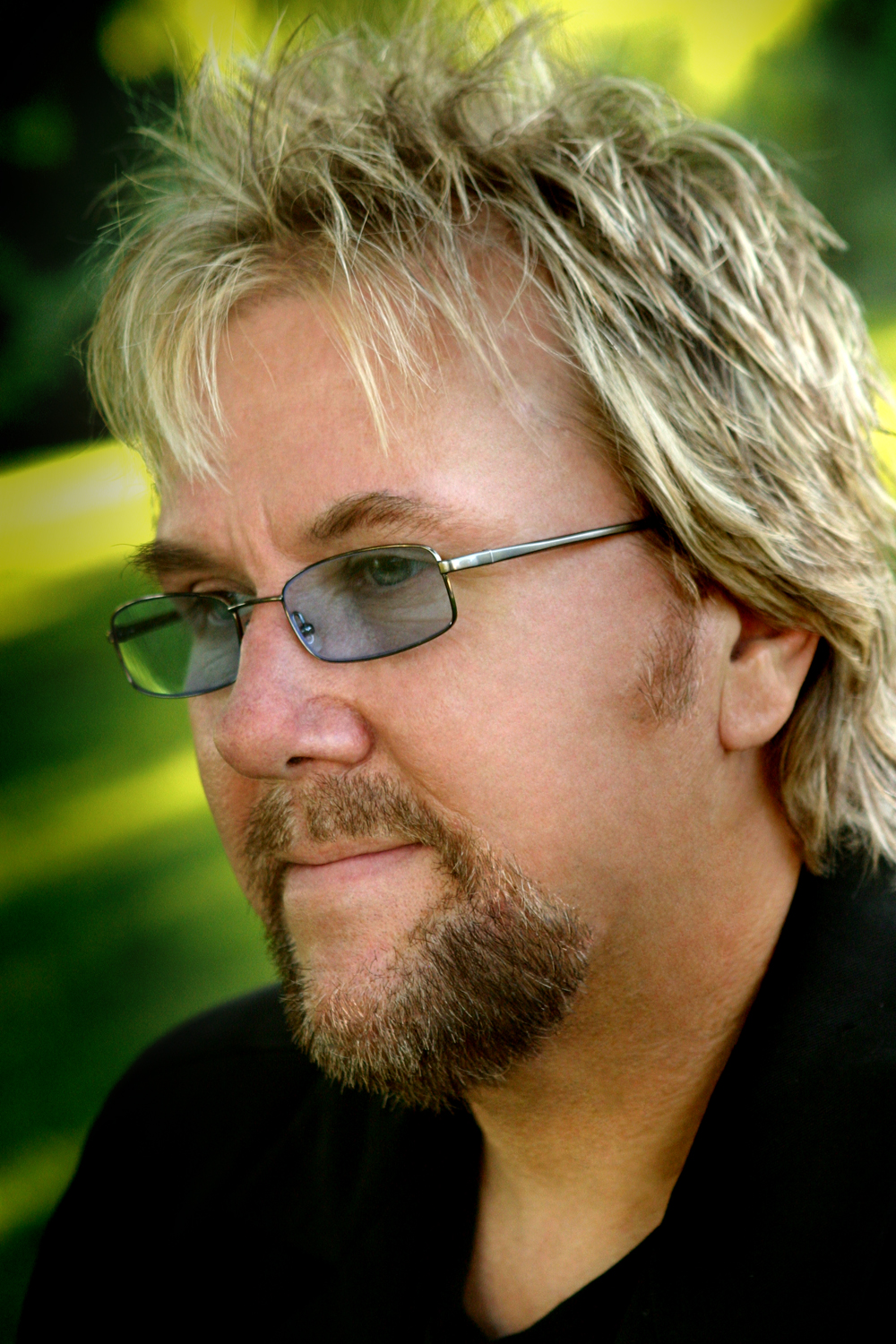
- Pack in 2005

Background information
- Born: David Robert Pack; July 15, 1952 (age 74); Huntington Park, California, U.S.
- Genres: Pop rock; progressive rock; soft rock
- Occupations: Singer; songwriter; record producer
- Instruments: Guitar; keyboards; vocals
- Years active: 1970–present
- Labels: Warner Bros.; 20th Century Fox; Concord
- Formerly of: Ambrosia
- Website: davidpack.com

David Robert Pack (born July 15, 1952) is an American singer, songwriter, who is best known as co-founder, lead vocalist and guitarist of the rock band Ambrosia in the 1970s and 1980s. Pack wrote and sang all of Ambrosia's RIAA certified gold hits including 3x Grammy nominee “Biggest Part of Me”, “How Much I Feel” and “You're the Only Woman (You & I).”

Pack also co-wrote and sang the band’s first top 20 hit, “Holdin’ On To Yesterday,” in 1975 with Joe Puerta, mixed by engineer Alan Parsons and was Grammy nominated.

In the mid-1990s, Pack produced Ambrosia's Anthology CD on Warner Bros. (Best of) along with three new tracks. These included “I Just Can't Let Go” with James Ingram and Michael McDonald remixed from Pack's solo album in 1986 (a top 15 Billboard Adult Contemporary hit).

Pack stopped touring with the band in 2000, after they played a concert in Atlantic City without him while he was on vacation with his family, fraudulently advertising that Pack would be performing.

== Career ==
=== Songwriter: Ambrosia, solo, other artists and special projects ===
Pack wrote and sang Ambrosia's No. 1 hit singles "Biggest Part of Me," (triple Grammy nominated) "How Much I Feel, "You're the Only Woman (You & I)." BMI 5 Million Airplay award winners and RIAA-Certified Gold records in 1980, plus "Holdin' on to Yesterday" (co wrote and sang) Ambrosia's first top 20 single in 1975. Pack wrote and sang title song "Life Beyond L.A." No. 1 FM track for Warner debut album 1978; Ambrosia's "Poor Rich Boy" with J. Puerta for Arthur movie soundtrack with Burt Bacharach.

"That Girl Is Gone" and "I Just Can't Let Go" top 10 AC hits from Pack's Anywhere You Go 1986 Warner solo album, the latter featuring James Ingram and Michael McDonald as a trio.

"Almost a Brand New Start" with Steve Perry for Pack's Secret of Movin On in 2005.

"All I Need" No. 1 RIAA Cert. Gold hit for Jack Wagner (Qwest/Warner Bros. record label, 1984).

"All the Pretty Ponies" for Kenny Loggins' Return to Pooh Corner (Sony Wonder, 1994).

"Wyld Unknown" for Wynonna's Theme Song from The Other Side, RIAA Gold CD (Curb Records, 1997) plus "Why Now" on the same LP.

"Prove Me Wrong" for White Nights film by Taylor Hackford; 2× platinum (Atlantic Records, 1985) with James Newton Howard.

"Through the Test of Time" Patti Austin No. 1 AC hit (GRP, 1990)

"Key to You" David Benoit featuring Pack No. 1 AC hit (GRP, 1986)

"Our Love", "Get the Word Started", and "By Heart" co-written with Michael McDonald, on McDonald's albums and Greatest Hits: Pack & McDonald also wrote "Outside" for Inside Moves movie soundtrack; "Our Love" was featured in the film No Mercy, starring Richard Gere and Kim Basinger.

"A Dream Is a Wish Your Heart Makes" for Disney's Cinderella, featuring Linda Ronstadt in 1986. Pack's writing turned the original 1950 animated 30-second tune into a 3 1/2-minute pop single that included arranging and co-orchestration with David Hamilton. Also collaborating with Leonard Bernstein's daughter Jamie for a Spanish version "Un Precioso Sueno" Ronstadt also sang.

Songs with Alan Parsons: "OH LIFE (There Must Be More) based on a true story; Clive Davis proclaimed Pack's lyrics as one of best ever. Also "I'm Talking to You", "The Three of Me" for Try Anything Once Arista LP and "You Can Run" for Parsons' 2004 A Valid Path LP.

Co-wrote "Where We Begin" with Chicago's Robert Lamm for Chicago 17, added as a bonus track on re-release.

Pack co-wrote and produced "Thank You Billy Graham" with Pat Boone and Billy Dean—the story of Reverend Graham's life in song and video, featuring Bono, TobyMac/DC Talk, Leann Rimes Billy Dean, Andrae Crouch and many others.

"Remember the Magic" Pack wrote for Disney's Music of the Parks LP featuring Bryan McKnight 1996 and produced it. Celebrating 25th Anniversary of Disney World.

For the Manhattan Transfer "A World Apart" with Janis Siegel and Michael McDonald.

For Jennifer Holliday Pack wrote "He Aint Special" with Michael McDonald.

Pack co wrote songs for Goldie Hawn's Wildcats soundtrack for Mavis Staples "Show Me How It Works" plus "Hard to Say" for James Ingram and "Don't Wanna Be Normal" Randy Crawford and "Love Lives Alone" for Tata Vega, with James Newton Howard, Hawk Wolinski, and Pat Leonard.

=== Solo ===
During the 1980s, Pack enjoyed moderate success as a solo artist with the release of his Anywhere You Go LP in 1985. The album generated three charting singles, the greatest of which was "I Just Can't Let Go" (US AC No. 13), a collaboration with Michael McDonald and James Ingram. In 1988, he recorded a duet with Bette Midler titled "I Know You by Heart", which was featured in the film Beaches and on its soundtrack.

=== with Alan Parsons ===
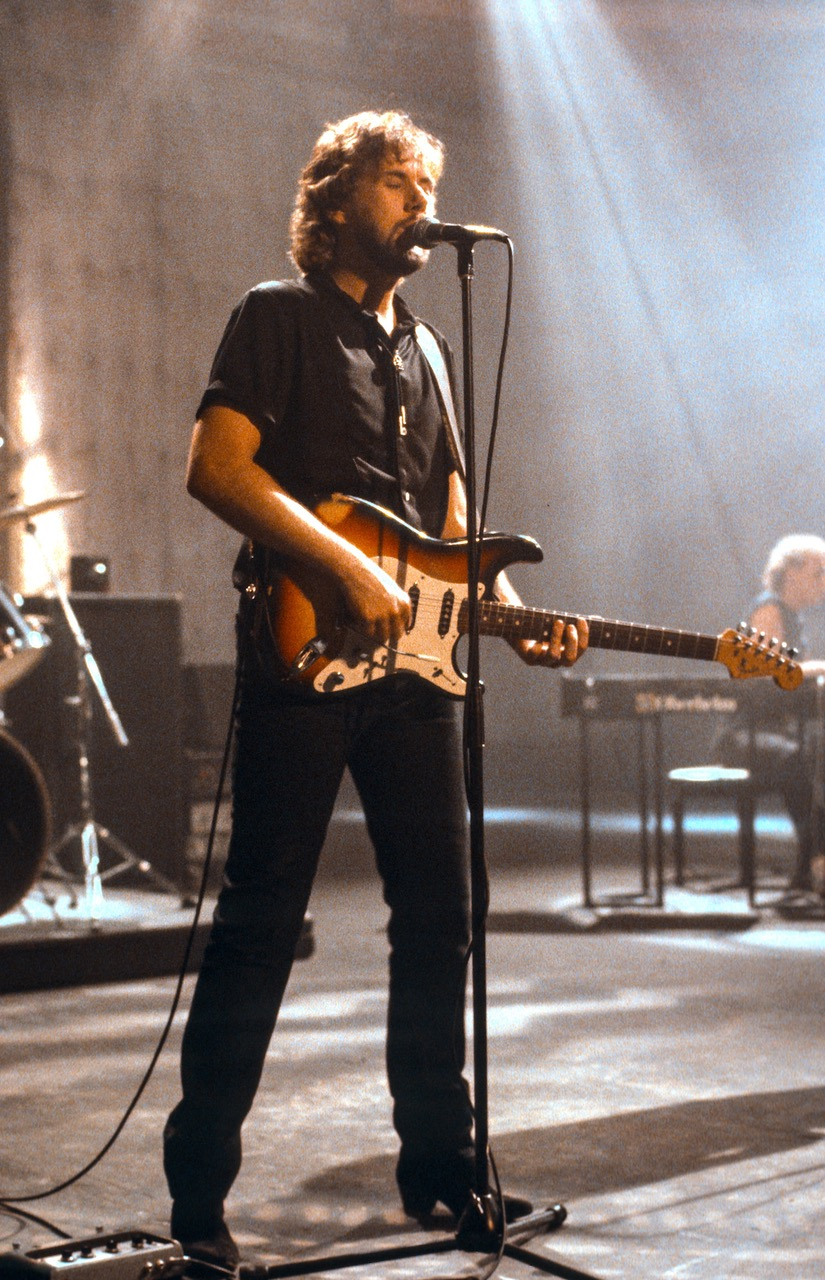
Pack performing with Ambrosia

Pack and artist-engineer Alan Parsons have had a lifelong friendship while making music together since 1975. Parsons mixed Ambrosia's Grammy nominated first LP and hit song "Holdin' on to Yesterday" then produced and engineered the second LP Somewhere I've Never Travelled also Grammy Nominated Best Engineered Record of 1976. Pack then introduced Parsons to 20th Century Fox Records Pres. Russ Regan, persuading him to sign Parsons to make his own album. That record became The Alan Parsons Project Tales of Mystery and Imagination Edgar Allan Poe with Ambrosia playing on "The Raven". Segue to 1993 and Parsons' Arista album Try Anything Once Pack co-wrote and sang three songs: "The Three of Me", "I'm Talkin to You", and "Oh Life (There Must Be More)" also playing guitar. The same year Pack as music director introduced Parsons at the Greek Theater Children of Bosnia benefit singing "Oh Life" for its debut live performance. In 2004 Pack co-wrote and sang "You Can Run" for Parsons' A Valid Path LP. Prior to that he joined Parsons for 2001 Beatles tribute "A Walk Down Abbey Road" tour of America and Japan that included Ann Wilson/Heart, Todd Rundgren, Jon Entwistle/Who. Pack performed triple duty singing Parsons' songs, his own songs and Beatle songs, while playing guitar in spectacular 3-hour tour de force event in major concert venues. Then Pack sang "I Won't Be Led Astray" with Joe Bonamassa on guitar, for Parsons 2022 From the New World LP.

Pack and Parsons continue to support each other with Pack having introduced Parsons to Leonard Bernstein in the 1980s, and Parsons introduced Pack to Sir Paul McCartney in 2023. Currently they are working on an EP of Beatle duets with "If I Fell" being played regularly on SiriusXM Beatles Channel. Pack asked Parsons to return to Abbey Road in Summer 2023, where he engineered orchestra sessions in Studio Two for Pack's upcoming album.

=== Guest appearances ===
Pack guested on lead vocals on the song "Ground Zero" for Kerry Livgren's 1980 solo album, Seeds of Change. He then performed on Kansas' Vinyl Confessions album in 1982. He would later contribute guest lead vocals on the track "Shine On" off of the album It's a Jungle Out There! by Mastedon, one of two Mastedon albums written and produced by former Kansas lead singer John Elefante and his brother Dino Elefante. He also appeared on Chet Atkins & Friends (1987) on Cinemax as guitarist. Pack later sang the part of Jesus on Livgren's 2021 album The Resurrection Of Lazarus: A Cantata.

=== As producer ===
Pack has worked as producer for Phil Collins, Aretha Franklin, Kenny Loggins, and Wynonna Judd. He has also produced music for Chet Atkins, Patti Austin, David Benoit, Natalie Cole, Chick Corea, Andrae Crouch, DC Talk, Amy Grant, Faith Hill, Bruce Hornsby, Jennifer Hudson, James Ingram, Patti LaBelle, Little Richard, Branford Marsalis, Bette Midler, Michael McDonald, Brian McKnight, Olivia Newton-John, The Pointer Sisters, LeAnn Rimes, Linda Ronstadt, Brian Setzer, Mavis Staples, Take 6, Steve Vai, Trisha Yearwood, and CeCe Winans.

Pack produced, conceived & arranged the 1995 BMG/ Sony Tribute to Leonard Bernstein: The Songs of West Side Story benefiting Bernstein Education Through the Arts (BETA) Fund & Grammy's Music in Schools, RIAA Certified Gold album. It featured 27 superstar artists including Aretha Franklin, Phil Collins, Natalie Cole, TLC, Lisa Left Eye Lopes, Brian Setzer, Chick Corea, Toto, David Paich, Sheila E, James Ingram, Michael McDonald, Bruce Hornsby, Patti Austin, Steve Vai, Little Richard, Take 6, Mervyn Warren, Def Jef, Paul Rodriguez, Jerky Boys, All-4-One and the late Selena's final performance featured in the film Selena soundtrack. This project included Broadway legend Stephen Sondheim allowing Pack to add lyric variations and rap improvs to songs "Officer Krupke" and Little Richard's "I Feel Pretty". Sondheim voiced his approval to Bernstein son Alexander in a note saying "To my surprise, I rather enjoyed both 'Krupke' and 'I Feel Pretty'".

Pack served as Music Director & Co Producer of President Clinton's Inaugural Arkansas Ball in 1993 and again in 1997 featuring David Pack's All Star Dream Team band: Michael McDonald, Bruce Hornsby, Kenny Loggins, Patti Austin, Greg Phillinganes, Nathan East, Steve Ferrone and others. Pack got Clinton to play sax on Loggins' "Your Mama Don't Dance" at '93 Inaugural that made headlines around the world. In 1997 Pack music directed "The Presidential Volunteer Summit" in Pa. with Oprah, Colin Powell and all living Presidents. Performing stars included Wynonna Judd, Bela Fleck, John Secada, and John Travolta.

In 2000 Pack co-music directed and performed for Yamaha's Millennium Lifetime Achievement Concert honoring Michael McDonald at Shrine Auditorium hosted by Jeff Bridges. The concert included performances by Ray Charles, Christopher Cross, Patti LaBelle, Kenny Loggins, Boz Scaggs and marked the debut performance of "Maria" by Michael, Pack, and James Ingram from The Songs of West Side Story album. In 2005 Pack produced and music directed the World Aids Day concert at Saddleback Church in Orange County, featuring artists ranging from Wynonna Judd and DC Talk's Michael Tait to country star Jimmy Wayne helping Purpose Driven Life author Pastor Rick Warren. Previous significant events Pack music directed include 1992 Aids Project LA feat. Elton John, Billy Joel, Barbra Streisand, Eddie Van Halen produced by Bernie Taupin; AmFar's Elizabeth Taylor tribute to Madonna; Avon Voices with Fergie, Dianne Warren; California Aids Walk 2010 Greek Theatre feat. Sheila E, Steve Lukather, Alan Parsons, Siedah Garrett.

=== Grammys ===
Pack won a Grammy for producing Patti Austin's "But Who May Abide" on Handel's Messiah: A Soulful Celebration "Best Contemporary Soul Gospel LP 1992" and a second Grammy for producing finale "To God Be the Glory" for Tribute: The Songs of Andrae Crouch "Best Pop/Contemporary Gospel Album 1997".

In addition, Pack has been Grammy nominated for co-producing Kenny Loggins' Return to Pooh Corner 1994 "Best Musical Album for Children". He has received five Grammy nominations for Ambrosia: "Best Pop Vocal Group (for One Eighty)", Best Arrangement for Voices "Biggest Part of Me" (1981), Best Arrangement Accompanying Voices "Biggest Part of Me" (1981), Ambrosia's first album for Best Engineered Recording (non classical), and Ambrosia's Somewhere I've Never Travelled (1976) Best Engineered Album (non Classical) engineered by Alan Parsons.

All told Pack has won two Grammys and been nominated six times.

He also sang on the 34th annual Grammy telecast in 1992 performance of "Hallelujah" from Handel's Messiah: A Soulful Celebration in an all-star choir with Quincy Jones conducting that included: Patti Austin, Daryl Coley (lead vocals), Andraé Crouch, Sandra Crouch, Edwin Hawkins, Tramaine Hawkins, Al Jarreau, Chaka Khan, Gladys Knight, Johnny Mathis, Marilyn McCoo, Stephanie Mills, Jeffrey Osborne, David Pack, Richard Smallwood, Sounds of Blackness, Take 6, Tevin Campbell, Vanessa Williams, and Chris Willis.

== Discography ==
=== Ambrosia ===
- Ambrosia (1975)
- Somewhere I've Never Travelled (1976)
- Life Beyond L.A. (1978)
- One Eighty (1980)
- Road Island (1982)

=== Solo albums ===
Year	Album details	Chart peak positions	Certifications	Notes
Year	Album details	U.S.	Certifications	Notes
1985	Anywhere You Go: Released: November 1985; Labels: Warner Bros.; Formats: CD, LP, CS, digital download	—		
1997	Wynonna LP The Other Side: Released: October 1997; Labels: Curb Records; Formats: CD, LP, CS, digital download	—	RIAA: Gold	Pack produced "The Wyld Unknown" & "Why Now."
2004	Unborn: Released: January 2004; Labels: Formats: CD, LP, CS, digital download	—		
2005	The Secret of Movin On: Released: August 2005; Labels: Peak Records; Formats: CD, LP, CS, digital download	—		
2014	David Pack's NapaCrossroads: Released: April 2014; Labels: Concord Records; Formats: CD, LP, CS, digital download	—		
2018	The Purpose of Christmas: Rick Warren: Released: October 2018; Labels: Wal Mart Exclusive; Formats: CD, LP, digital download	—		Pack Produced & Arranged Benefitting Global P.E.A.C.E.
	A Tribute to Andre Crouch: Released: Labels: Formats: CD, cassette, digital	—		** Grammy Winner Best Contemporary Gospel Album of Year. Pack Produced Finale "To God Be the Glory."
	Cece Winans: His Gift: Released: Labels: Formats: CD, LP, digital download	—		
	Thank You: Billy Graham: Released: Labels: Formats: CD, LP, digital download	—		
	Handel's Messiah: A Soulful Celebration: Released: Labels: Formats: CD, LP, digital download	—		** Grammy Winner Best Contemporary Christian album of year. Pack Produced Patti Austin's "But Who May Abide."
	Wayne Watson: Field of Souls: Released: Labels: Formats: CD, LP, digital download	—		
	Lisa Nevill: Love of Heaven: Released: Labels: Formats: CD, LP, digital download	—		
	Brian Duncan: Released: Labels: Formats: CD, LP, digital download	—		

=== Solo singles ===
Year	Title	Chart positions				Certifications	Album	Notes
Year	Title	US	US AC	AU	CAN	Certifications	Album	Notes
1985	"That Girl Is Gone"	--	16	—	93		Anywhere You Go	
1986	"Prove Me Wrong"	95	—	—	—		White Nights	
1986	"I Just Can't Let Go"	—	13	—	—		Anywhere You Go	
1987	"The Key To You"	—	—	—	—			Duet with David Benoit
2005	"You're The Only Woman" re-make	—	—	—	—		The Secret of Movin On	
2005	"Biggest Part of Me" re-make	—	—	—	—		The Secret of Movin On	

=== Movie soundtracks ===
Year	Album details	Chart peak positions	Certifications
Year	Album details	U.S.	Certifications
1985	White Nights: Released: November 1985; Labels: “Atlantic”; Formats: CD, LP, CS, digital download	—	RIAA: Gold
1986	Wildcats: Released: February 1986; Labels: “Warner Bros”; Formats: CD, LP, CS, digital download	—	
1988	Beaches: Released: December 1988; Labels: “Atlantic”; Formats: CD, LP, CS, digital download	—	RIAA: Platinum 3x
1995	The Music of Cinderella: Released: September 1995; Labels: “Walt Disney; Formats: CD, LP, CS, digital download	—	
1997	Selena: Released: March 1997; Labels: “Warner Bros.”; Formats: CD, LP, CS, digital download	—	RIAA: Platinum
2015	Gallows Road: Released: August 2015; Labels: Provident; Formats: CD, LP, CS, digital download	—	

=== Record producer highlights ===
Year	Title	Artist	Notes
1985	White Nights film Soundtrack	Various	RIAA Platinum (Atlantic)
1990	The Real Me, Patti Austin	Patti Austin	
1991	Carry On	Patti Austin	
1992	Handel's Messiah: A Soulful Celebration	Various	"But Who May Abide the Day of His Coming" - Patti Austin / Grammy Winner
1994	Return To Pooh Corner	Kenny Loggins	RIAA Platinum Grammy-Nominated
1994	Disney's Cinderella feat. Linda Ronstadt & others	Linda Ronstadt + various	Co-writer of "A Dream is a Wish"
1996	The Songs Of West Side Story	Various	Aretha Franklin, Selena, Phil Collins, Trisha Yearwood, Little Richard, Chick Corea, James Ingram, TLC; RIAA Gold
1996	Tribute: Songs of Andrae Crouch	Various	Grammy Best Contemp Gospel Album of Year
1997	The Other Side	Wynonna Judd	RIAA Gold / "Wyld Unknown" "Why Now"
1997	Ambrosia Anthology	Ambrosia	Greatest hits + 3 new songs
1998	His Gift, CeCe Winans	Various	Dove Award-nominated
1998	One Heart At A Time Cystic Fibrosis	Various	Featuring Garth Brooks, Faith Hill, Olivia Newton John
2000	Michael McDonald's Blue Obsession	Michael McDonald	Performer on "Ain't That Peculiar" (track 11)
2002	Psalm 23 project 9/11 Children of Victims NY American Bible Society	Various	
2014	David Pack's Napa Crossroads		Featuring Doors’ Ray Manzarek, Todd Rundgren, Alan Parsons, Bela Fleck, David Benoit, Rooney Robert Schwartzman, others
2014	"Thank You Billy Graham"	Various	Single / featuring Bono, Leann Rimes, TobyMac, Andrae Crouch
	Purpose of Christmas	Various	Featuring Sarah McLachlan, Vince Gill, Rick Warren

=== Film & TV ===
Year	Title	Notes
1980	Inside Moves	“Outside” co written with Michael McDonald
1980	Coast to Coast	
1981	Arthur	“Poor Rich Boy” co-written w/ Burt Bacharach - Movie Soundtrack
1986	No Mercy	Co-writer “Our Love” with Michael McDonald
1986	Wildcats	Four songs with James Newton Howard incl. Mavis Staples “Show Me How It Works” & Randy Crawford “I Don't Wanna Be Normal”
1987	White Nights	Wrote and sang “Prove Me Wrong” for dance sequence for Mikhail Baryshnikov & Gregory Hines; Platinum soundtrack/Atlantic
1987	Chet Atkins & Friends - HBO special	Featuring Chet Atkins, Mark Knopfler, Willie Nelson, Emmylou Harris, Everly Bros.; Pack Guitar duet with Chet “Sunrise”
1988	Beaches	Duet with Bette Midler “I Know You By Heart”; 2× platinum soundtrack
2002—2003	Roseanne	Composed all music
2004	A Gathering of Friends - Michael McDonald PBS TV Special	With McDonald, Pack and James Ingram performing songs as a trio
2007	Knocked Up	
2016	Tammy -Melissa McCarthy	
2017	The Big Sick	
2023	Sometimes When We Touch-The Rein, Ruin & Resurrection of Soft Rock Paramount Plus	
2024	The Last Showgirl	
2024	Yacht Rock Dockumentary	
	Pack -TV Host - Time Life/ Star Vista Greatest Soft Rock Hits 70's & 80's’’	

=== Other projects ===
- Symbols of Tyme
- Beato Band
