= Burleigh Drummond =

American musician (born 1951)

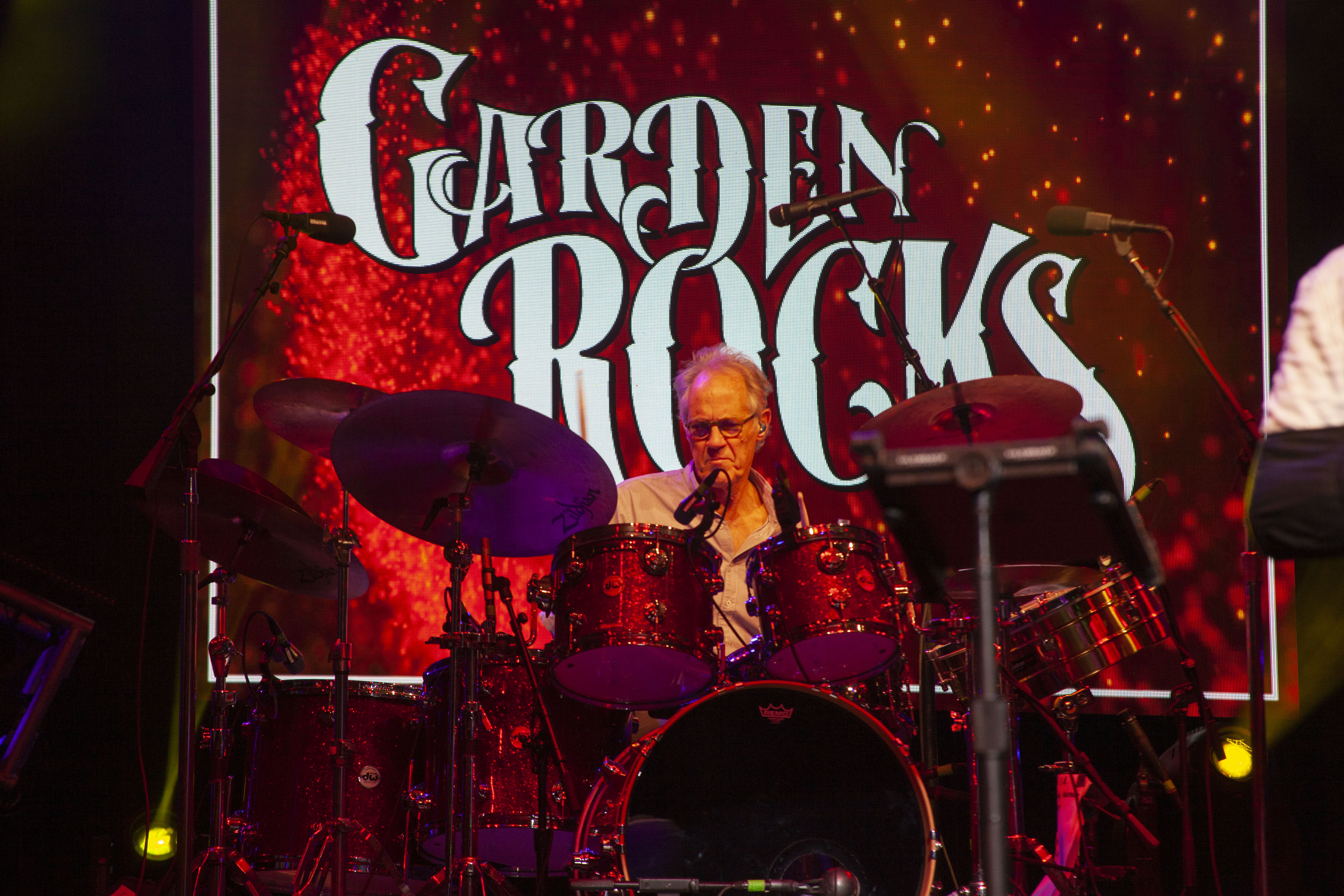
- Drummond on stage in 2019

Background information
- Born: September 25, 1951 (age 75); Fort Leavenworth, Kansas, U.S.
- Instruments: Drums; percussion; vocals; bassoon
- Years active: 1962–present
- Labels: Warner Bros.; Sony/BMG; Tin Drum Music
- Member of: Ambrosia

Burleigh Drummond (born September 25, 1951) is an American drummer, percussionist, producer, songwriter, and singer. He is a founding member and the only drummer/percussionist for the five-time Grammy Award nominated band Ambrosia. He performs onstage in the band with his wife and fellow band member Mary Harris, and the couple are also both active members of Bill Champlin’s Wunderground and their own band Tin Drum.

== Early life ==
A self-described Army brat, Drummond's parents were in the U.S. Army, with his father a full colonel who once wrote a speech for John F. Kennedy and his mother an army nurse. The family moved often and ended up being stationed in Ankara, Turkey. From an early age Drummond realized he would be involved in the percussive arts after seeing Turkish people making cymbals. Drummond was also taught the accordion and guitar. He started taking drum lessons in the fifth grade.

His influences for his drum playing range from "classical to jazz to African and Indian". His influence on being a musician came when he saw The Beatles playing "Twist and Shout" on television.

== Career ==
After playing in various bands, Drummond signed up with a musicians contact service for five dollars, and within a week all three members of what would become the band Ambrosia, David Pack, Joe Puerta and Christopher North, came by his residence and formed the group "before we ever played a note". Drummond has described Ambrosia compositionally as "Joe Puerta and David Pack were like our Lennon and McCartney and I was kind of the George Harrison!"

The band had two singles hit the Top three in the US charts: "How Much I Feel" and "Biggest Part of Me", split up in 1982 and reformed in 1989, and still tour the country. Drummond recorded on every Ambrosia record from 1970 to the present, and toured internationally with the band throughout its history, performing around 60 gigs per year.

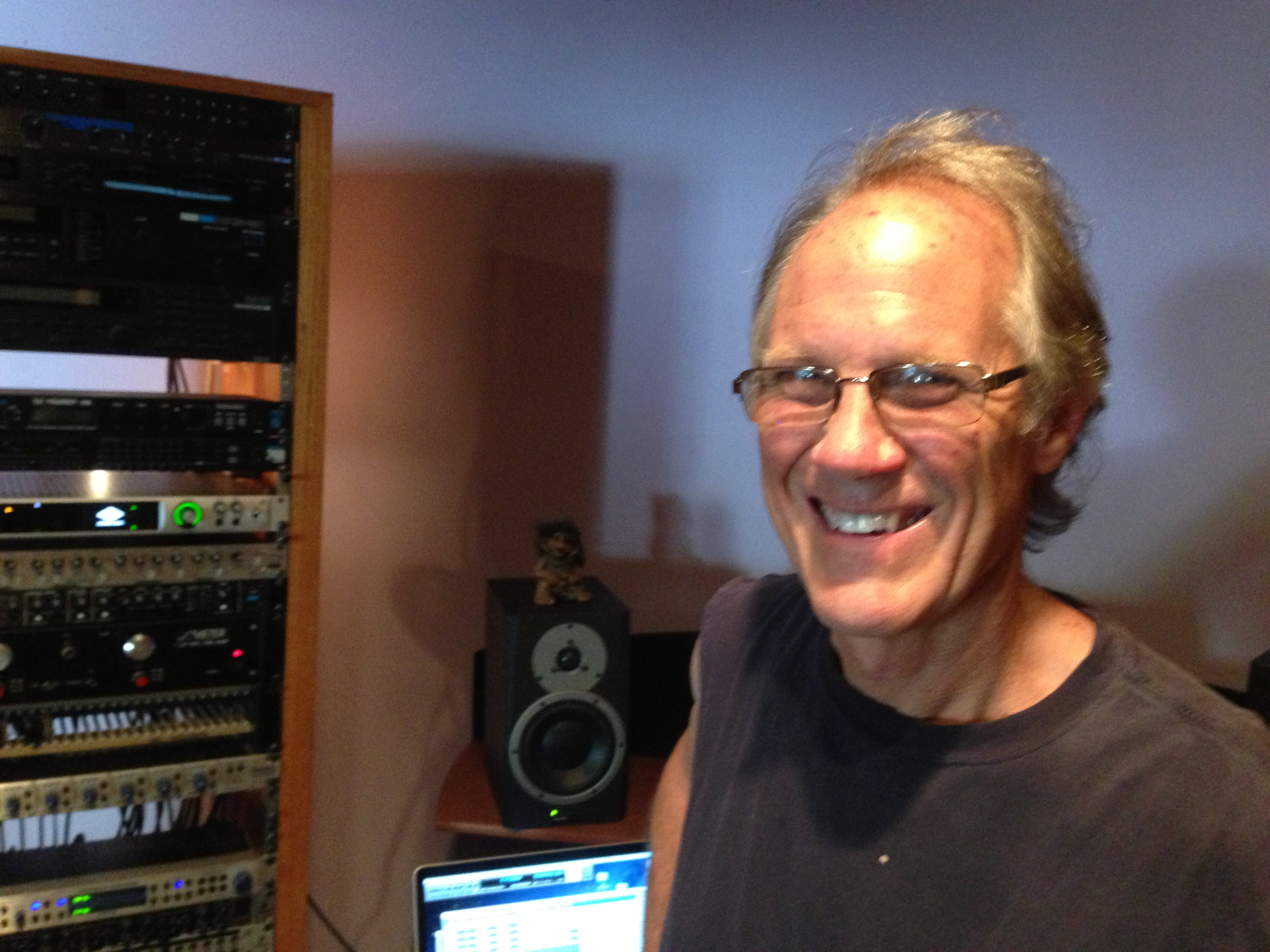
Drummond in his studio in 2013

Drummond and his wife, Mary Harris, formed the band Tin Drum in the 1990s, and have released three albums. Harris and Drummond have performed together onstage with Ambrosia since Harris became a member in 2012, Tin Drum, and since 2018 in Bill Champlin’s Wunderground.

== Personal life ==
Drummond has been married to musician Mary Harris since 1983. Drummond performs Yoga every morning.
