= Joe Puerta =

American musician (born 1951)

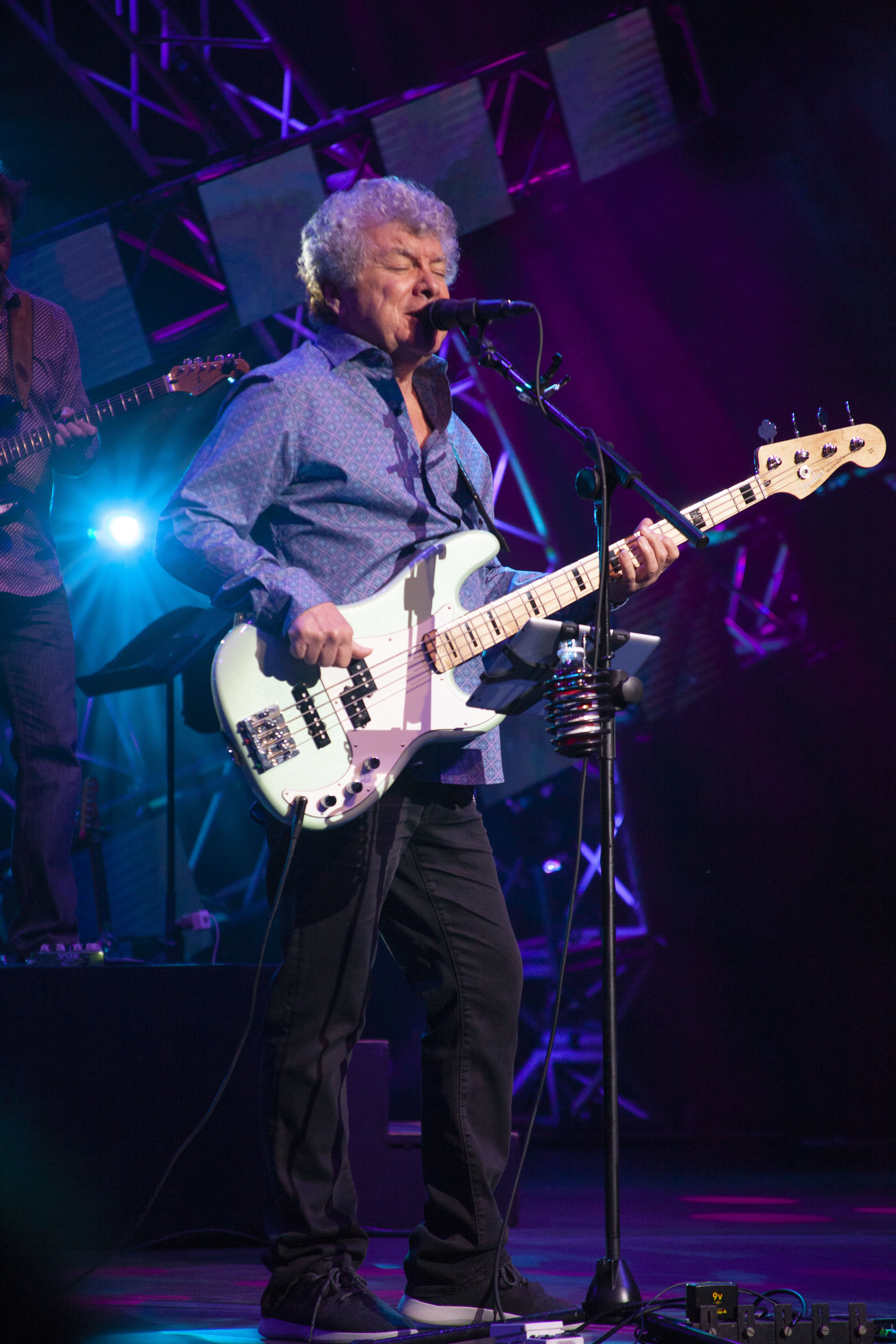
- Puerta performing with Ambrosia in 2019

Background information
- Born: July 2, 1951 (age 75); Lomita, California, US
- Origin: Lomita, California
- Genres: Pop, rock
- Occupations: Singer, musician
- Instruments: Vocals, bass guitar
- Years active: 1970–present

Joe Puerta Jr. (born July 2, 1951) is the bassist/vocalist and founder of the American rock group Ambrosia. He co-wrote one of the band's early hits, "Holdin' On To Yesterday" (1975).

== Early life ==
Puerta was born in California to a family of Spanish background. His father, Joe Puerta Sr., was born in Spain and was a wrestler while at the University of Illinois in the early 1930s. He was mentioned in the New York Times when he was nineteen years old in 1933.

He started playing the bass as a teenager and played in local bands. The first band he saw live was The Yardbirds. When he was fifteen years old, he was in a high school band called The Centuries, and put an ad up for a new guitar, which is how he met David Pack. The two were in and out of different bands for the next few years.

== Career ==
After graduating high school, Puerta formed a new band which Pack joined, this band eventually morphing into Ambrosia. Puerta and Pack formed the classic lineup with Christopher North and Burleigh Drummond. While the band was still in its early years, Joe was a touring member (bass/vocals) of the bands for Chi Coltrane and Laura Branigan. Most of Ambrosia's hit singles were written solely by Pack, however their first hit song and first single released, "Holdin' on to Yesterday", was co-written by Puerta with Pack in 1975.

Puerta worked with Sheena Easton during the 1980s when Ambrosia were on hiatus. He then left Easton in 1984 and became a founding member of Bruce Hornsby and the Range. His association with Bruce Hornsby started when Hornsby was invited to play sessions with Ambrosia on their last album. In 1987, while Puerta was still in The Range, the band won a Grammy award for Best New Artist.

Ambrosia reformed in 1989, but Puerta was unsure if he could rejoin due to his schedule with The Range. Shem von Schroeck was hired as a multi-instrumental member of the band but fortunately Joe's schedule opened and he eventually came back to the band.

== Personal life ==
In 2020, Joe married his tour manager and long-time fan Shannon Marie Killala on Star Vista’s 70’s Rock and Romance Cruise during a unique concert/wedding with his Ambrosia bandmates (Chris North best man, Burleigh Drummond officiating) and friends John Ford Coley, Peter Beckett, and Stephen Bishop. He resides in southern California.
