= Gentlemen Broncos =

- Promotional poster
- Directed by: Jared Hess
- Written by: Jared Hess; Jerusha Hess
- Produced by: Mike White; John J. Kelly
- Starring: Michael Angarano; Jemaine Clement; Jennifer Coolidge; Sam Rockwell
- Cinematography: Munn Powell
- Edited by: Yuka Ruell
- Music by: David Wingo
- Distributed by: Fox Searchlight Pictures
- Release dates: September 24, 2009 (Fantastic Fest); October 30, 2009 (United States)
- Running time: 89 minutes
- Country: United States
- Language: English
- Budget: $10 million
- Box office: $118,192

Gentlemen Broncos is a 2009 American comedy film written by Jared and Jerusha Hess and directed by Jared Hess. The film stars Michael Angarano, Jemaine Clement, Jennifer Coolidge, and Sam Rockwell. The film is about a teenage author whose fantasy story is plagiarized by an established author.

== Plot ==
Benjamin Purvis lives with his single mother Judith, who designs tacky clothes and makes rock-hard popcorn balls. Judith and Benjamin make ends meet by working at a women's retail clothing store. Benjamin spends his spare time writing science fiction stories, and has recently completed Yeast Lords, which centers on a hero named Bronco, modeled after his long-dead father. At various times, portions of Yeast Lords are seen as Benjamin imagines them. Bronco is obliquely masculine, and he valiantly struggles with a villain over yeast production.

While attending a two-day writing camp for aspiring fantasy and science fiction authors, Benjamin attends lectures by his idol, the prolific and pretentious writer Ronald Chevalier. Chevalier announces a contest for the writers, in which the winner's story will be published nationally. After encouragement from fellow camper Tabatha, Benjamin submits Yeast Lords. Tabatha shows the story to her friend Lonnie Donaho who runs an ultra low-budget video production company. Lonnie gives Benjamin a post-dated check for $500 and begins adapting Yeast Lords into a film.

As Chevalier reviews the stories from the campers, he gets a call from his publisher, rejecting his latest manuscript. Panicked, he picks up Benjamin's story, and it sparks his imagination. Chevalier changes Purvis' Bronco into Brutus, an extremely effeminate and comically flamboyant hero, changes the other character names and title, but otherwise leaves the story intact. His publisher loves it, and the novel is rushed into production under the title Brutus and Balzaak. Portions of Chevalier's version are now seen playing out alongside Benjamin's original vision of the story.

At the local premiere of Donaho's version of Yeast Lords, Benjamin is nauseated to see how badly Donaho has adapted his work, and abruptly leaves the film with Tabatha. They go to a bookstore where he discovers Chevalier's plagiarism after reading a paragraph from Brutus and Balzaak. Benjamin confronts Chevalier at a local book signing, and assaults him with some merchandise Chevalier had offered Benjamin in exchange for keeping his theft quiet. Two policeman hustle Benjamin out of the store and he is put in jail.

Judith comes to visit her son in jail to give him his birthday present. She hands him a box of manuscripts, all officially bound by the Writers Guild of America. Judith explains that she has been registering all his stories with them since he was seven years old, thinking they would make a nice keepsake for his children. Yeast Lords is one of the registered stories, allowing Chevalier to be exposed as a fraud. Copies of Brutus and Balzaak are unceremoniously dumped from store shelves and replaced with Yeast Lords. Benjamin uses some of the money from the book's sales to help Judith put on a successful fashion show for her clothing, modeled by Benjamin's friends.

== Cast ==
- Michael Angarano as Benjamin Purvis
- Jennifer Coolidge as Judith Purvis
- Jemaine Clement as Dr. Ronald Chevalier
- Mike White as Dusty
- Hector Jimenez as Lonnie Donaho
- Halley Feiffer as Tabatha Jenkins
- Josh Pais as Todd Keefe
- Sam Rockwell as Bronco/Brutus
- Edgar Oliver as Duncan/Lord Daysius
- Suzanne May as Vanaya/Venonka
- Clive Revill as Cletus

== Production ==
In December 2007, JoBlo.com reported that Jared and Jerusha Hess had signed with Fox Searchlight Pictures to produce Gentlemen Broncos, based on a spec script they had written. The deal called for Jared Hess to direct and Mike White, who co-wrote Nacho Libre with them, to produce. Hess brought Angarano onto the project based on his performance in the film Snow Angels, which also starred Rockwell. Filming began in March 2008 in Utah. Much of the film was shot in Tooele, Utah.

In early August 2008, work on an Internet viral marketing began, which had a video introducing the character of Ronald Chevalier. A second video was released in October 2008. A trailer was released on August 19, 2009. Some of the artwork in the opening credits is by fantasy and science fiction artist David Lee Anderson.

== Release ==
Gentlemen Broncos was intended to be released theatrically on October 30, 2009, but due to poor reviews, the national release was pulled from theaters.

== Reception ==
The film received mostly negative reviews and holds a 20% rating on Rotten Tomatoes based on 79 reviews by critics and the sites consensus reads: "Unselfconsciously juvenile and overwhelmingly quirky, Gentlemen Broncos offers a lot of potty humor but isn't terribly funny". Metacritic gave it a generally unfavorable 28 out of 100 based on 21 reviews. Roger Ebert gave the film 2 out of 4 stars, writing that "Hess invents good characters, but they quickly become lost in a disjointed and meandering story.” However, Richard Brody, writing for The New Yorker, lauded the film, and in 2018 described Gentlemen Broncos as "a truly great film, with no asterisk whatsoever".

== Home media ==
Gentlemen Broncos was released on DVD and Blu-ray on March 2, 2010.

== Soundtrack ==
The following songs appear in the film:

=== Track listing ===
1. "In the Year 2525" – Zager and Evans
2. "Act Naturally" – Buck Owens
3. "What a Town" – David Bromberg
4. "Cedar Dreams" – John Two-Hawks
5. "Twilight" – John Two-Hawks
6. "First Flight" – John Two-Hawks
7. "Winds of Stillness" – John Two-Hawks
8. "John Sebastian's Girl" – Shara Joyce and Rory O'Donoghue
9. "Don Carlo" – Robert Miller
10. "The Oh of Pleasure" – Ray Lynch and Tom Canning
11. "Beautiful Girl" – Patrick Sharp and Mark Stevens
12. "Wind of Change" – Scorpions
13. "New World Anthem" – Jeremy Wall
14. "Moment of Truth" – Dan Graham
15. "Celestial Soda Pop" – Ray Lynch
16. "Tiny Geometries" – Ray Lynch
17. "Just Like Jesse James" – Cher
18. "Paranoid" – Black Sabbath
19. "Carry on Wayward Son" – Kansas
20. "Celtic Voyage" – Joel Bevan
21. "Dust in the Wind" – Kansas
