= Deep Breakfast =

- Original artwork 1984–1986

Studio album by Ray Lynch
- Released: December 12, 1984
- Recorded: September–October 1984
- Studio: Ray Lynch's home studio
- Genres: New-age space music
- Length: 40:20
- Labels: Ray Lynch Productions; Music West (1986 reissue); Windham Hill Records (1992 reissue)
- Producer: Ray Lynch

Ray Lynch chronology
The Sky of Mind (1983)	Deep Breakfast (1984)	No Blue Thing (1989)

Professional ratings
Review scores
Source	Rating
AllMusic	5/5 stars
Encyclopedia of Popular Music	3/5 stars

Deep Breakfast is the second album by American new-age artist Ray Lynch, released on December 12, 1984, on Lynch's own label. After signing with Music West Records, the album was released more widely in March 1986. By October 1986 the album had sold 72,000 copies, becoming Lynch's breakout work. The first track, "Celestial Soda Pop" was used as the theme song of the NPR show Fresh Air, increasing exposure and sales of the album.

Upon its re-release, the album was universally praised for its new-age style melding of electronic and classical sounds. In 1989, the album peaked at number 2 on Billboard's Top New Age Albums chart, behind David Lanz's album Cristofori's Dream. The album was certified Platinum by the Recording Industry Association of America in 1994.

== Concept ==
The album's title and some of the song names were taken from the then-unpublished The Mummery Book by Lynch's spiritual teacher, Adi Da Samraj. The line inspiring the album's name was reprinted on the back of the LP sleeve in 1986: "Evelyn slapped Raymond on the back with a laugh. 'You must be starved, old friend. Come into my apartments, and we'll suffer through a deep breakfast of pure sunlight.'" In an interview with Cymbiosis, Lynch said that "Celestial Soda Pop" was named by a friend of Lynch after hearing that song for the first time.

The artwork used for the album was oil painted by Lynch's friend, Kim Prager.

== Reception ==
Joe Brown of The Washington Post praised the album, calling it an album that is "effective with headphones". Brown particularly praised the song "The Oh of Pleasure", stating that it "uses gradual amplification to give the strange sensation that you're being drawn deeper and deeper into the sound." Bill Henderson of the Orlando Sentinel called the album a "rare surprise", praising its "smoothness and sheer beauty." P. J. Birosik of Yoga Journal called the album "the breakthrough new age pop record". David Stockdale of Sunday Tasmanian labeled the album more than "a modern masterpiece" because "It's an absolute joy to behold." Stockdale also compared some of Lynch's works in the album to Vangelis, especially in "Your Feeling Shoulders". William Ruhlmann of AllMusic gave the album five stars, praising the album's use of "deeply textured melodic structure and a buoyant rhythmic underpinning ". Digital Audio & Compact Disc Review praised the album, believing that it is a "step forward toward maturity for New Age music." Electronic Musician noted that the album is rooted from baroque music, specifically in the way Lynch "constructs neoclassical, melodically beautiful songs of remarkable clarity." The magazine also noted that "Lynch's relationship with synthesizers is a bit different from a keyboardist's" due to his background as a lutist. In an article regarding the artist, Steve Korte of CD Review considered the album a classic.

On June 3, 1989, Cash Box magazine commented that the album became "the only gold album ever by a new age artist on an indie label."

== Track listing ==
Deep Breakfast includes the following tracks. All music is written by Ray Lynch, except where noted.

No.	Title	Writer(s)	Length
1.	"Celestial Soda Pop"		4:37
2.	"The Oh of Pleasure"	Tom Canning, Ray Lynch	5:18
3.	"Falling in the Garden"		2:44
4.	"Your Feeling Shoulders"		7:28
5.	"Rhythm in the Pews"		4:09
6.	"Kathleen's Song"		4:05
7.	"Pastorale"		5:26
8.	"Tiny Geometries"		6:08

== Personnel ==
All music composed, arranged, and produced by Ray Lynch except The Oh of Pleasure which was co-written by Lynch and Tom Canning.

- Ray Lynch – keyboards, piano, guitar
- Tom Canning – keyboards on "The Oh of Pleasure"
- Beverly Jacobs – flute
- Ron Strauss – viola

=== Production ===
- George Horn at Fantasy Studios – mastering

== Charts ==
Chart (1988–1989)	Position
Billboard New Age Albums	2
Cash Box Indie Jazz Albums	26

== Certifications ==
Region	Certification	Certified units/sales
United States (RIAA)	Platinum	1,000,000^{^}
^{^} Shipments figures based on certification alone.
