= Adi Da bibliography =

Cover of the 2007 edition of The Knee Of Listening

Following is a list of works by Adi Da, a spiritual teacher who authored more than 75 books during his life, including those published posthumously. He wrote prolifically about his spiritual philosophy, creating the Dawn Horse Press in 1973 to publish his books. It continues to print many Adi Da-authored titles. Best known among these is his autobiography, The Knee Of Listening.

== 1970s ==
- The Knee Of Listening: The Divine Ordeal of The Avataric Incarnation of Conscious Light, 1st ed. 1972 subtitled "The Early Life and Radical Spiritual Teachings of Franklin Jones", 2nd ed. 1973, 3rd ed. 1978, 4th ed. 1984, standard ed. 1992, new ed. 1995 subtitled "The Early-Life Ordeal and the Radical Spiritual Realization of the Divine World-Teacher, Adi Da (The Da Avatar)", standard ed. 2004: ISBN 1-57097-167-6
- The Method of the Siddhas: Talks with Franklin Jones on the Spiritual Technique of the Saviors of Mankind, 1st ed. 1973, 2nd printing 1973, 3rd ed. 1978, 4th ed. 1987, new ed. 1992, new ed. 1995, new ed. 2005 as My Bright Word: Discourses from The Divine Siddha-Method Of The Ruchira Avatar: ISBN 1-57097-015-7
- Garbage and the Goddess: The Last Miracles and Final Spiritual Instructions of Bubba Free John, 1974: ISBN 0-913922-10-2
- The Spiritual Instructions of Swami Muktananda, Edited with Introduction and Epilogue by Bubba Free John (Franklin Jones), 1974: ISBN 0-913922-02-1
- Conscious Exercise and the Transcendental Sun, 1st ed. 1974, 2nd ed. 1975, 3rd ed. 1977: ISBN 0-913922-30-7
- No Remedy: An Introduction to the Life and Practices of the Spiritual Community of Bubba Free John, 1st ed. 1975, 2nd ed. 1976: ISBN 0-913922-20-X
- The Paradox of Instruction: An Introduction to the Esoteric Spiritual Teaching of Bubba Free John, 1977: ISBN 0-913922-28-5
- Breath and Name: The Initiation And Foundation Practices Of Free Spiritual Life, 1977: ISBN 0-913922-29-3
- The Way That I Teach: Talks on the Intuition of Eternal Life, 1978: ISBN 0-913922-38-2
- The Enlightenment of the Whole Body: A Rational and New Prophetic Revelation of the Truth of Religion, Esoteric Spirituality, and the Divine Destiny of Man, 1978: ISBN 0-913922-35-8
- Love of the Two-Armed Form: The Free and Regenerative Function of Sexuality in Ordinary Life and the Transcendence of Sexuality in True Religious or Spiritual Practice, 1st ed. 1978, 2nd ed. 1985: ISBN 0-913922-37-4
- The Eating Gorilla Comes in Peace: The Transcendental Principle of Life Applied to Diet and the Regenerative Discipline of True Health, 1st ed. 1979, 2nd ed. 1987: ISBN 0-913922-19-6

== 1980s ==
- The Four Fundamental Questions: Talks and Essays About Human Experience and the Actual Practice of an Enlightened Way of Life, 1st ed. 1980, reprinted 1984: ISBN 0-913922-49-8
- Compulsory Dancing: Talks and Essays on the Spiritual and Evolutionary Necessity of Emotional Surrender to the Life-Principle, 1st ed. 1980, reprinted 1983: ISBN 0-913922-50-1
- Bodily Worship of the Living God: The Esoteric Practice of Prayer Taught by Da Free John, 1st ed. 1980, 2nd ed. 1983: ISBN 0-913922-52-8
- Scientific Proof of the Existence of God Will Soon Be Announced By The White House!: Prophetic Wisdom About the Myths and Idols of Mass Culture and Popular Religious Cultism, the New Priesthood of Scientific and Political Materialism, and the Secrets of Enlightenment Hidden in the Body of Man, 1980: ISBN 0-913922-48-X
- The Bodily Sacrifice of Attention: Introductory Talks on Radical Understanding and the Life of Divine Ignorance, 1981: ISBN 0-913922-59-5
- "I" Is the Body of Life: Talks and Essays on the Art and Science of Equanimity and the Self-Transcending Process of Radical Understanding, 1981: ISBN 0-913922-60-9
- The Bodily Location of Happiness: On the Incarnation of the Divine Person and the Transmission of Love-Bliss, 1982: ISBN 0-913922-61-7
- Raw Gorilla: The Principles of Regenerative Raw Diet Applied in True Spiritual Practice as lived by members of The Johannine Daist Communion under the guidance of the Divine Adept Da Free John, 1982: ISBN 0-913922-62-5
- The Yoga of Consideration and The Way That I Teach, 1982: ISBN 0-913922-63-3
- Nirvanasara: Radical Transcendentalism and the Introduction of Advaitayana Buddhism, 1982: ISBN 0-913922-65-X
- I Am Happiness: A Rendering for Children of the Spiritual Adventure of Master Da Free John, 1982: ISBN 0-913922-68-4
- Forehead, Breath, and Smile: An Anthology of Devotional Readings from the Spiritual Teaching of Master Da Free John, 1982: ISBN 0-913922-70-6
- Crazy Da Must Sing, Inclined To His Weaker Side: Confessional Poems of Liberation and Love by the "Western" Adept, Da Free John, 1982: ISBN 0-913922-71-4
- The Fire Gospel: Essays and Talks on Spiritual Baptism, 1982: ISBN 0-913922-78-1
- The God In Every Body Book: Talks and Essays on God-Realization, 1st ed. 1983, 2nd ed. 1983: ISBN 0-913922-78-1
- The Dreaded Gom-Boo (or The Imaginary Disease That Religion Seeks To Cure): A Collection of Essays and Talks on the "Direct" Process of Enlightenment, 1st ed. 1983, 2nd ed. 1983: ISBN 0-913922-74-9
- Enlightenment and the Transformation of Man: Selections From Talks And Essays On The Spiritual Process And God-Realization, 1983: ISBN 0-913922-83-8
- Look At The Sunlight On The Water: Educating Children for a Life of Self-Transcending Love and Happiness, 1st ed. 1983, reprinted 1984, 2nd ed. 1987: ISBN 0913922-84-6
- God Is Not A Gentleman and I Am That One: Ecstatic Talks on Conventional Foolishness versus the Crazy Wisdom of God-Realization, 1983. ISBN 0-913922-85-4
- Do You Know What Anything Is?: Talks and Essays on Divine Ignorance, 1984: ISBN 0-913922-87-0
- The Transmission of Doubt: Talks and Essays on the Transcendence of Scientific Materialism through Radical Understanding, 1984, ISBN 0-913922-77-3
- The Illusion of Relatedness: Essays on True and Free Renunciation and the Radical Transcendence of Conditional Existence, 1986: ISBN 0-918801-01-X
- The Holy Jumping-Off Place: An Introduction to the Way of the Heart, 1986: ISBN 0-913922-94-3
- The Sky Goes On Forever: A Book about Death for Children, 1989: ISBN 0-918801-13-3
- The Da Upanishad: The Short Discourses on Self-Renunciation, God-Realization, and the Illusion of Relatedness, 1989: ISBN 0-918801-16-8
- The Lion Sutra: The "Perfect" Revelation-Book of the Divine World-Teacher and True Heart-Master, Da Avabhasa (The "Bright"). (On Perfect Transcendence Of The Primal Act, Which Is the ego-"I", the self-Contraction, or attention itself, and All The Illusions Of Separateness, Otherness, Relatedness, and Difference), previously published as The Love-Ananda Gita (The Free Song of Love-Bliss), 1st ed. 1986, new ed 1995: ISBN 1-57097-012-2

== 1990s ==
- The Ego-"I" Is The Illusion of Relatedness, 1991: ISBN 0-918801-32-X
- Feeling Without Limitation: Awakening to the Truth Beyond Fear, Sorrow, and Anger, 1991: ISBN 0-918801-28-1
- The Heart's Shout: The Liberating Wisdom of Da Avabhasa, 1st ed. 1993, 2nd ed. 1996: ISBN 1-57097-019-X
- The Incarnation of Love: "Radical" Spiritual Wisdom and Practical Instruction on Self-Transcendending Love and Service in All Relationships by The Divine World-Teacher and True Heart-Master, Da Avabhasa (The "Bright"), 1st ed. 1993, 2nd printing 1994, 3rd printing 1994: ISBN 0-918801-86-9
- Money: The Commitment of Life-Force in the Forms of Efforts and Love. Instructions on Financial Responsibility and the Sacred Use of Money in the Way of the Heart from The Divine World-Teacher and True Heart-Master, Da Avabhasa (The "Bright"), 1993: ISBN 0-918801-88-5
- The Art and Yoga of Sexual Practice: Talks on the Regenerative Sexual Yoga for Beginners in the Way of the Heart, 1994: ISBN 0-918801-97-4
- Ishta: The Way of Devotional Surrender to the Divine Person, 1994: ISBN 0-918801-98-2
- Abide With Me In Faithful Love: The Heart-Word of Adi Da (The Da Avatar) on Sexual Practice and Renunciation in the Way of the Heart, 1995: ISBN 1-57097-020-3
- The Order Of My Free Names: The Self-Revelation of the Incarnate Divine Person, Adi Da, and How to Call Him By Name, 1996: ISBN 1-57097-024-6
- Drifted In The Deeper Land: Talks on Relinquishing the Superficiality of Mortal Existence and Falling by Grace in the Divine Depth That Is Reality Itself, 1997: ISBN 1-57097-037-8
- The Mummery Book: A Parable Of The Divine True Love, Told By Means Of A Self-Illuminated Illustration Of The Totality Of Mind, 2005: ISBN 1-57097-175-7
- Real God Is The Indivisible Oneness Of Unbroken Light: Reality, Truth and The "Non-Creator" God In The True World-Religion Of Adidam. Book One of The Seventeen Companions of The True Dawn Horse. 1999: ISBN 1-57097-055-6
- The Truly Human New World-Culture Of Unbroken Real-God-Man: The Eastern Versus The Western Traditional Cultures Of Mankind and The Unique New Non-Dual Culture Of The True World-Religion of Adidam. Book Two of the Seventeen Companions of the True Dawn Horse. 1999: ISBN 1-57097-056-4

== 2000s ==
- What, Where, When, How, Why, and Who To Remember To Be Happy Book: A Simple Explanation Of The Divine Way Of Adidam (For Children, and Everyone Else). Book Thirteen of the Seventeen Companions of the True Dawn Horse. 2000: ISBN 1-57097-074-2
- I Give You The Gift Of One Another: The Call to ego-Transcending Cooperation and the Creation of Authentic Intimate (Local) and Global Community, 2000: ISBN 1-57097-083-1
- Death Is A Living Process: The Mate Moce Guide to Serving the Dying, 2000: ISBN 1-57097-085-8
- The Only Complete Way To Realize The Unbroken Light Of Real God: An Introductory Overview Of The "Radical" Divine Way Of The True World-Religion Of Adidam. Book Three of the Seventeen Companions of the True Dawn Horse. 2000: ISBN 1-57097-107-2
- Ruchira Avatara Hridaya-Siddha Yoga: The Divine (and Not Merely Cosmic) Spiritual Baptism in The Divine Way Of Adidam. Book Eight of the Seventeen Companions of the True Dawn Horse. 2000: ISBN 1-57097-106-4
- The All-Completing and Final Divine Revelation To Mankind: A Summary Description Of The Supreme Yoga Of The Seventh Stage Of Life In The Divine Way Of Adidam. Book Eleven of the Seventeen Companions of the True Dawn Horse. 2001: ISBN 1-57097-124-2
- Santosha Adidam: The Essential Summary Of The Divine Way Of Adidam. Book Fourteen of the Seventeen Companions of the True Dawn Horse. 2001: ISBN 1-57097-123-4
- He-And-She Is Me: The Invisibility of Consciousness and Light in the Divine Body of the Ruchira Avatar. Book Ten of the Seventeen Companions of the True Dawn Horse. 2000: ISBN 1-57097-108-0
- The Seven Stages Of Life: Transcending The Six Stages Of egoic Life and Realizing The ego-Transcending Seventh Stage Of Life In The Divine Way Of Adidam. Book Ten of the Seventeen Companions of the True Dawn Horse. 2000: ISBN 1-57097-105-6
- The Bright Field: The Photographic Art of Adi Da Samraj, 2001: ISBN 1-57097-130-7
- Aham Da Asmi (Beloved, I Am Da). Book One of The Five Books of The Heart of The Adidam Revelation. 1st ed. 1998, 2nd ed. 2000, 3rd ed. 2003: ISBN 1-57097-163-3
- Da Love-Ananda Gita (The Free Avataric Gift of the Divine Love-Bliss). Book Two of The Five Books of The Heart of The Adidam Revelation. 1st ed. The Love-Ananda Gita 1989, standard ed. The Love-Ananda Gita 1990, standard ed. The Santosha Avatara Gita 1995, standard ed. 1998, standard ed. 2000, standard ed. 2005: ISBN 1-57097-166-8
- Ruchira Avatara Gita (The Avataric Way of the Divine Heart-Master). Book Three of The Five Books of The Heart of The Adidam Revelation. 1st ed. The Hymn of the Master 1982, new ed. The Hymn Of The True Heart-Master 1992, standard ed. The Hymn Of The Tue Heart-Master 1995, standard ed. 1998, standard ed. 2000, standard ed. 2004: ISBN 1-57097-164-1
- Hridaya Rosary (Four Thorns Of Heart-Instruction). Book Four of The Five Books of The Heart of The Adidam Revelation. 1st ed. Four Thorns Of Heart-Instruction 1997, standard ed. 1998, standard ed. 2000, standard ed. 2005: ISBN 1-57097-204-4
- Eleutherios (The Only Truth That Sets The Heart Free). Book Five of The Five Books of The Heart of The Adidam Revelation. 1st ed. [The Liberator (Eleutherios)] 1982, new ed. [The Liberator (Eleutherios)], 1995, standard ed. 1998, standard ed. 2001, standard ed. 2006: ISBN 1-57097-187-0
- The Dawn Horse Testament Of The Ruchira Avatar: The Testament Of Divine Secrets Of The Divine World-Teacher, Ruchira Avatar, Adi Da Samraj, 1st ed. 1985, 2nd ed. 1991, new ed. 2004: ISBN 1-57097-168-4
- Easy Death: Spiritual Wisdom on the Ultimate Transcending of Death and Everything Else, 1st ed. 1983, 2nd ed. 1991, 3rd ed. 2005: ISBN 1-57097-202-8
- Religion and Reality: True Religion Is Not Belief in Any God-Idea but the Direct Experiential Realization of Reality Itself, 2006: ISBN 1-57097-212-5
- The Ancient Reality-Teachings: The Single Transcendental Truth Taught by the Great Sages of Buddhism and Advaitism, 2006: ISBN 1-57097-198-6
- The Liberator: The "Radical" Reality-Teachings of The Avataric Great Sage, Adi Da Samraj, 2006: ISBN 1-57097-211-7
- The Perfect Tradition: The Wisdom-Way of the Ancient Sages and Its Fulfillment in the Way of "Perfect Knowledge", 2006: ISBN 1-57097-197-8
- The Way of Perfect Knowledge: The "Radical" Practice of Transcendental Spirituality in the Way of Adidam, 2006: ISBN 1-57097-213-3
- The Yoga of Right Diet: An Intelligent Approach To Dietary Practice That Supports Communion with the Living Divine Reality, 2006: ISBN 1-57097-193-5
- The Ancient Walk-About Way: The Core Esoteric Process of Real Spirituality and Its Perfect Fulfillment in the Way of Adidam, 2007: ISBN 1-57097-221-4
- "Radical" Transcendentalism: The Non-"Religious", Post-"Scientific", and No-Seeking Reality-Way of Adidam, 2007: ISBN 1-57097-226-5
- Perfect Philosophy: The "Radical" Way of No-Ideas, 2007: ISBN 1-57097-231-1
- The Spectra Suites, 2007: ISBN 1-59962-031-6
- The Complete Yoga of Human Emotional-Sexual Life: The Way Beyond Ego-based Sexuality, 2007: ISBN 978-1-57097-235-5
- The Self-Authenticating Truth: Essays from The Aletheon, 2007: ISBN 1-57097-245-1
- Surrender Self By Sighting Me: Essays from The Aletheon on Right and True Devotion, 2007: ISBN 978-1-57097-237-9
- The Orders Of My True And Free Renunciate Devotees, 2007: ISBN 978-1-57097-244-7
- Reality Itself Is The Way: Essays from The Aletheon, 2007: ISBN 1-57097-238-9
- Aesthetic Ecstasy, 2008: ISBN 1-57097-236-2
- My Final Work of Divine Indifference, 2008: ISBN 1-57097-234-6
- The Seventh Way: New Essays from The Aletheon, 2008: ISBN 1-57097-242-7
- Perfect Abstraction: New Essays written for Transcendental Realism, 2008: ISBN 1-57097-250-8
- The Teaching Manual of Perfect Summaries, 2008: ISBN 1-57097-254-0
- Green Gorilla: The Searchless Raw Diet, 2008: ISBN 1-57097-256-7
- Atma Nadi Shakti Yoga: The Intrinsically egoless Transcendental Spiritual Reality-Way of Adidam Ruchiradam, 2008: ISBN 978-1-57097-255-3
- Reality Is All the God There Is: The Single Transcendental Truth Taught by the Great Sages and the Revelation of Reality Itself, 2008: ISBN 978-1-59477-257-3
- The Boundless Self-Confession: Essays from The Aletheon, 2009: ISBN 978-1-57097-260-7
- The Aletheon: The Divine Avataric Self-Revelation of His Divine Presence, Avatar Adi Da Samraj, 2009: ISBN 978-1-57097-274-4

== 2010s ==
- The Gnosticon: The "Perfect Knowledge" Reality-Teachings of His Divine Presence, Avatar Adi Da Samraj, 2010: ISBN 1-57097-281-8
- The Reality-Way of Adidam: The Divine Process That Outshines All Seeking in the Perfect Freedom of Reality Itself, 2010: ISBN 1-57097-282-6
- Transcendental Realism: The Image-Art of egoless Coincidence With Reality Itself, 1st ed. 2007, 2nd ed. 2010: ISBN 1-57097-285-0
- The Eternal One: The Divine Mahasamadhi of the Divinely Translated Master, Parama-Sapta-Na Adi Da, 2010: ISBN 1-57097-278-8
- Recognition of Me Is Liberation: The Radical Conversion To Intrinsic egolessness In The Divine Reality-Way of Adidam, 2010: ISBN 1-57097-286-9
- The Pneumaton: The Transcendental Spiritual Reality-Teachings of His Divine Presence, Avatar Adi Da Samraj, 2011: ISBN 1-57097-288-5
- Right Life Is Free Participation In Unlimited Radiance: The Functional, Practical, Relational, and Cultural Disciplines In The Divine Reality-Way of Adidam, 2011: ISBN 1-57097-299-0
- The First Three Stages of Life, 2011: ISBN 1-57097-300-8
- The Sacred Space of Finding Me: The Cultural Disciplines Practiced In The Sacred Domain of The Divine Reality-Way of Adidam, 2011: ISBN 978-1-57097-305-5
- The Nine Great Laws of Devotion to Me, 2012: ISBN 1-57-097311-3
- Notice This, 2012: ISBN 978-1-57097-320-8
- Always Enact Fidelity to Me: The Foundation Emotional-Sexual Discipline In The Divine Reality-Way of Adidam, 2012: ISBN 978-1-57097-314-7
- My "Bright" Sight: Discourses from The Divine Siddha-Method Of The Ruchira Avatar, 2014: ISBN 978-1-57097-347-5
- Prior Unity: The Basis for a New Human Civilization, 2015: ISBN 978-1-942789-00-0
- My "Bright" Form: Discourses from The Divine Siddha-Method Of The Ruchira Avatar, 2016: ISBN 978-1-57097-357-4
- Listen to My Testament of Divine Secrets, vol. 1–4, 2018: ISBN 978-1-57097-366-6
- Conductivity Healing: Energy-Healing Practices That Support An Intelligent, Harmonious, and Flowing Re-Integration of The Physical and Etheric Dimensions of The Human Body, 2018: ISBN 1-57-097373-3
- Not-Two Is Peace: The Ordinary People's Way of Global Cooperative Order, 1st ed. 2007, 2nd ed. 2007, 3rd ed. 2009, 4th ed. 2019: ISBN 978-1-942789-05-5
- Vegetable Surrender, or, Happiness Is Not Blue, 1st ed. 1987, 2nd ed. 2020: ISBN 978-1-57097-384-0
