= Ray Lynch =

American musician (1943–2025)

- Lynch in the 1980s
- Born: Raymond Augustus Lynch; July 3, 1943; Salt Lake City, Utah, U.S.
- Died: December 22, 2025 (aged 82); California, U.S.
- Occupations: Musician, composer
- Spouses: Ginny (before 1970s, divorced); Kathleen Bennett (m. 1976)
- Children: 2
- Musical career
- Genres: New-age, instrumental, classical
- Instruments: Guitar, lute, keyboards
- Years active: 1967–1974; 1980–2000
- Labels: Ray Lynch; Music West; Windham Hill
- Website: www.raylynch.com

Raymond Augustus Lynch (July 3, 1943 – December 22, 2025) was an American guitarist, lutenist, keyboardist, and composer known for his new-age releases in the 1980s.

In the late 1960s, Lynch performed on the lute in New York's Renaissance Quartette, but he withdrew to California and began incorporating electronic music elements, as heard in 1983's The Sky of Mind. He vaulted to fame in 1986 with the single "Celestial Soda Pop" and the 1984 album Deep Breakfast, becoming the first independent new-age artist certified Gold for sales of 500,000. His album No Blue Thing topped the Billboard New Age album chart in 1989. Lynch sued his label Music West and joined Windham Hill in 1992 before retiring in 2000.

== Early life ==
Lynch was born on July 3, 1943, in Salt Lake City, Utah. As the second of four children, Lynch was raised in West Texas. Lynch's father was a lawyer; Lynch's mother was a noted watercolorist and an amateur pianist who influenced him to create music as a child. Other early influences included hymns and soundtracks. Lynch began studying the piano at the age of six. At age twelve, he was inspired by Andrés Segovia's classical recordings and decided to pursue a career in music. After attending high school in both St. Stephen's Episcopal School and Austin High School, (Note: In interviews, Lynch says he was raised in West Texas, but he also says that his high schools were in Austin, which is in central Texas.) Lynch went to the Austin campus of the University of Texas. After studying there for a year, he moved to Barcelona with his wife Ginny and his child. Over there, he was apprenticed to Eduardo Sainz de la Maza, a classical guitar teacher. Three years later Lynch returned to the university to study composition with various instruments including guitar, lute, and vihuela. While Lynch went on to become a musician, his siblings ended up becoming lawyers.

== Life and career ==
In 1967, while still in college, Lynch was invited to New York City to join the Renaissance Quartet, performing the lute alongside Robert White (tenor), Barbara Mueser (viol), and Morris Newman (recorder), replacing Joseph Iadone. Lynch also performed with other groups, such as "Festival Winds", as well as collaborative and solo performances. Lynch also taught the guitar, lute, and vihuela in the Mexican city of Taxco in the late 1960s. During his career, Lynch purchased a 125-acre farm in Maine. By 1974, Lynch experienced a "spiritual crisis" that led to his decision to move from Maine to California and give up his musical career. Although he became a carpenter and a purchasing agent in California, Lynch also continued to practice his compositional skills. In an interview with The Arizona Republic, Lynch said that his return to music was prompted by a suggestion from his spiritual teacher, Adi Da, in California.

To prepare for his return to music, Lynch bought an ARP Odyssey with "borrowed money" in 1980; the synthesizer helped him create music in the developing electronic genre. Two years later, Lynch released his first album, Truth Is the Only Profound, which recites the teachings of Adi Da "set to the background of devotional music and songs". Lynch later followed up with an instrumental album, The Sky of Mind. When Lynch released his third album, Deep Breakfast, in 1984 independently, he sold over 72,000 albums out of his small apartment. Lynch was featured on Musical Starstreams in June 1985. Immediately after joining Music West in Winter 1985, he released Deep Breakfast to a wider audience. The track "Celestial Soda Pop" was used in 1986 as bumper music for the NPR program All Things Considered. In January 1989, the album hit number 2 on the Billboard New Age chart, then in April it was certified Gold by the RIAA. In August 1989, No Blue Thing was released, and it became Lynch's first album to hit number 1 on Billboard's "Top New Age Albums" chart, doing so in September. No Blue Thing was also his only album to appear on Billboard's "Top 200 Albums", peaking at number 197. It won Billboard's "Top New Age Album" in 1990, and Lynch also won Billboard's "Top New Age Artist" in both 1989 and 1990. After years of steady sales, Deep Breakfast was certified Platinum in May 1993.

During his time with Music West, Lynch was featured on Good Morning America as well as the Spanish La 1 program "Música N.A.". In 1991, Lynch sued Music West for allegedly not paying him for his work. He left Music West, taking the rights to his music with him, and signed up with Windham Hill Records. Under the new label, Lynch's albums The Sky of Mind and No Blue Thing (but not Deep Breakfast) were re-released in September 1992 with new album covers.

Under the new record company, Lynch followed up with his final album, the classical Nothing Above My Shoulders but the Evening, in 1993. The album featured members of the San Francisco Symphony. Like the preceding album, it hit number 1 on the "Top New Age Albums" chart. In 1998, Lynch released his first and only compilation album, Best Of, Volume One, which included two original tracks and a remix of "Celestial Soda Pop". Lynch left Windham Hill in 2000 and re-released his own catalog of music under his own record company.

In September 2015, Lynch's house was destroyed by the Valley Fire, along with his studio, awards, and the master tapes of his music. As a result, his friend Grant Valdes Huling set up a GoFundMe page, which ultimately raised over $20,000.

Lynch died at his home in California, on December 22, 2025, from complications from a fall, at the age of 82. His death was not publicly announced until February 2026.

== Influences ==
Throughout his career, Lynch did not want his music to be classified as "New Age". In an interview with CD Review in August 1989, Lynch said he did not really mind being labeled as a "new age" artist, but said that he does not like "being grouped with music that I felt is, in general, pretty mediocre and boring". Lynch also said that "'classical' would be the best category for me."

Lynch had been both a student and follower of Adi Da since 1974. In regards to the spiritual nature of his music, Lynch believed that it "has to be judged subjectively by the listener, not the composer." Lynch named several of his songs and albums after the themes found in Da's novel, The Mummery Book. However, in a 1989 Arizona Republic interview, Lynch clarified that he was not trying to promote Da's work through his music. After the death of Adi Da, Lynch performed various songs for Da's tribute album, "May You Ever Dwell In Our Heart", in 2009.

== Personal life ==
Lynch's first wife was Ginny, whom he married and divorced before the 1970s. He was married to his second wife, Kathleen Bennett, in April 1976. He remained married to Kathleen until his death.

== Discography ==
Album	Year	Label	Chart Performance				Reference
Album	Year	Label	US New Age		US Billboard 200		Reference
Album	Year	Label	Weeks	Peak	Weeks	Peak	Reference
Truth Is the Only Profound	1982	Ray Lynch Productions	–	–	–	–	
The Sky of Mind	1983	Ray Lynch Productions; Music West; Windham Hill Records	–	–	–	–	
Deep Breakfast	1984	Ray Lynch Productions; Music West; Windham Hill Records	156	2	–	–	
No Blue Thing	1989	Music West; Windham Hill Records	99	1	2	197	
Nothing Above My Shoulders but the Evening	1993	Windham Hill Records	41	1	–	–	
Best Of, Volume One	1998	Windham Hill Records	8	19	–	–	

== See also ==
- List of ambient music artists
