= Mandy Harvey =

American jazz and pop singer and songwriter

- Born: Amanda Lynn Harvey; January 2, 1988 (age 38); Cincinnati, Ohio, U.S.
- Genres: Jazz, pop
- Occupations: Singer, songwriter
- Instruments: Vocals, ukulele

Amanda Lynn Harvey (born January 2, 1988) is an American jazz and pop singer and songwriter. Profoundly deaf following an illness at the age of eighteen, she was a contestant on the 12th season of America's Got Talent, where she performed original songs during the competition.

== Early life and education ==
Harvey was born in Cincinnati, before moving to St. Cloud, Florida. She had hearing problems, and underwent several surgeries as a child to try to correct them. Her family moved to Colorado when she was a young child. She sang throughout her childhood, and her talent was recognized at Longmont High School, where she graduated in 2006. Harvey gradually lost her hearing, as a result of the connective tissue disease Ehlers-Danlos syndrome. She lost her hearing completely when she was eighteen, while she was majoring in vocal music education at Colorado State University. As a result, she left the university.

== Music career ==
After fully losing her hearing in 2007, Harvey became depressed and quit music. However, with the aid of visual tuners, she learned how to find the correct pitches when singing. In 2008, she met jazz pianist Mark Sloniker, at Jay's Bistro in Fort Collins, Colorado (where she began performing regularly). She later performed at Dazzle Jazz Lounge in Denver, and recorded three studio jazz albums. JazzTimes wrote of her 2009 debut album, Smile, claiming: "The vocals are rich and captivating". Her second album, After You've Gone, was released in 2010. In 2011, Mandy won VSA's International Young Soloist Award. She later returned to perform at the Kennedy Center. Her third album, All of Me, followed in 2014. Her fourth album, Nice to Meet You, was released in 2019. Her fifth album, Paper Cuts, arrived in 2022.

=== America's Got Talent ===
In 2017, Harvey appeared on America's Got Talent during season 12, where she took fourth place. She was given the Golden Buzzer by Simon Cowell, after performing an original song with her ukulele, during the competition.

During the same year, Harvey published a memoir with co-author Mark Atteberry, titled Sensing the Rhythm: Finding My Voice in a World Without Sound. In a November 2017 interview for the BBC, Harvey described how she was accused of promoting oralism when she first took to the stage, and had received death threats from within the deaf community for promoting a "hearing" activity.

In July 2022, Cowell ranked his favorite Top 15 Golden Buzzer moments in AGT history during season 17, in which Harvey placed 5th.

== Personal life ==
Harvey is an ambassador for the nonprofit organization No Barriers, which helps disabled people overcome obstacles.

In May 2022, Harvey announced her pregnancy, something she and her husband initially kept a secret (due to uncertainties surrounding her EDS). In June 2022, Harvey and her husband became parents of a boy named Louis.

== Discography ==
- Smile (2009)
- After You've Gone (2010)
- All of Me (2014)
- Nice to Meet You (2019)
- Paper Cuts (2022)
