= Celestial Soda Pop =

Song by Ray Lynch

from the album Deep Breakfast
- Released: December 12, 1984
- Genre: New-age
- Length: 4:37
- Songwriter: Ray Lynch

Audio sample
- file; help

"Celestial Soda Pop" is a song by American new-age musician Ray Lynch for his second album, Deep Breakfast.

== Composition ==
The song was composed in C♯ minor and features a repetitive progression performed on a synthesizer.

== Reception ==
In reviewing Lynch's album No Blue Thing, Keith Tuber of Orange Coast called "Celestial Soda Pop" "irresistible." Meanwhile, in reviewing Deep Breakfast, P.J. Birosik of Yoga Journal called "Celestial Soda Pop" a "wonderfully memorable little tune". Steve Korte of CD Review referred to the song as "a standard that you've probably heard dozens of times in your local supermarket or dentist's office". However, John Schaefer, author of New Sounds: A Listener's Guide to New Music, referred to the piece as a "vacuous title" and claimed that Lynch possesses "limited ability on the synthesizer".

== Remixes ==
In 1998, Ray Lynch produced a techno remix of "Celestial Soda Pop" for his compilation album, Best Of, Volume One. The song was later remixed by Boreta of the Glitch Mob in 2015.

== In popular culture ==
In 1986, "Celestial Soda Pop" was used as a theme song for the NPR show Fresh Air. The track was also featured in the 1987 documentary film, Downwind/Downstream. On May 26, 1990, Joel Selvin of the San Francisco Chronicle commented that the use of the song by NPR probably caused Deep Breakfast to have a "considerable boost" in sales. In 1991, the Stone Mountain Laser Show near Atlanta began using "Celestial Soda Pop" as one of the tracks in the show, set to animated shapes and colors.
