= Spheeris =

Spheeris is a Greek surname.

People with the last name Spheeris:

- Chris Spheeris, Greek-American new age composer
- Jimmie Spheeris (1949–1984), American singer-songwriter
- Penelope Spheeris (born 1945), American director, producer and screenwriter
