= The Sky of Mind =

Studio album by Ray Lynch
- Released: 1983
- Genre: New-age, instrumental
- Length: 45:24
- Label: Ray Lynch Productions
- Producer: Ray Lynch

Ray Lynch chronology
Truth Is the Only Profound (1982)	The Sky of Mind (1983)	Deep Breakfast (1984)

The Sky of Mind is the first independent album by American new-age musician Ray Lynch, released in 1983.

== Production ==
The album was recorded and produced at Lynch's own home. The album was dedicated to his spiritual teacher, Adi Da Samraj. On the label is a quote from Adi Da's 1978 work, The Enlightenment of the Whole Body, starting with "The mind is like a cave of bats." The titles "Quandra", "Too Wounded", and "Green Is Here" were also taken from works by Adi Da. The album was rearranged for its subsequent re-releases.

== Reception ==
Professional ratings
Review scores
Source	Rating
AllMusic	3/5 stars
Encyclopedia of Popular Music	3/5 stars

Stephen David of New Age Journal described the album as a "suite of meditations", stating that it was "quiet, ethereal, and a little predictable". AllMusic gave the re-release a 3/5, writing "the radiant compositions also make for ideal morning listening". In the appendix of their 1988 book, Healing Music, Andrew Watson and Nevill Drury writes that the album is "a modern interpretation of classical themes", noting the combination of acoustic and synthesized instruments. They also wrote that one of the tracks, "The Temple", "could easily be inspired by Ligeti".

== Track listing ==
All tracks are written by Ray Lynch.

No.	Title	Length
1.	"Quandra"	9:13
2.	"Good News"	6:18
3.	"The Temple"	7:58
4.	"Too Wounded"	8:59
5.	"Pavane"	6:47
6.	"Green Is Here"	5:43

== Personnel ==
- Ray Lynch – synthesizers, piano and guitar
- Van Thanh Nguyen – Tibetan bells
- Beverly Jacobs – flute
- Eric Leber – recorders
- Adam Trombly – tambura
- Julie Feldman – cello
- Rick Concoff – violin
- Ginny Leber, Sylvia Hayden, Antonina Randazzo – vocal effects

Production

- Stephen Hart and Ray Lynch – engineering and mixing
