= Best Of, Volume One =

Greatest hits album by Ray Lynch
- Released: February 10, 1998
- Recorded: Digital remaster by Daniel Ryman
- Genre: Instrumental new-age
- Length: 69:03
- Label: Windham Hill Records
- Producer: Ray Lynch

Ray Lynch chronology
Nothing Above My Shoulders but the Evening (1993)	Best Of, Volume One (1998)

Professional ratings
Review scores
Source	Rating
Allmusic	4.5/5 stars
Encyclopedia of Popular Music	4/5 stars

Best Of, Volume One is American new-age musician Ray Lynch's only compilation album, combining tunes from his independently released material with his later Windham Hill recordings. The compilation also includes three new compositions – "Ralph's Rhapsody", "The Music of What Happens", and a remix of Lynch's first single, "Celestial Soda Pop". The album peaked at number 19 on Billboard's "Top New Age Albums Chart".

== Reception ==
Carmel Carrillo of The Baltimore Sun gave the album two stars out of five, praising Lynch's combination of "synthesized and classical styles" but criticized the three new tracks, commenting that they are "disappointing compared with his better-known works from previous releases." Carrillo especially criticized the "Celestial Soda Pop" remix for being "too techno for many New Age devotees." Meanwhile, Steve Huey of Allmusic gave the album 4.5/5 stars, claiming that the album is "the perfect introduction to Lynch's brand of lush, ambient electronic music."

== Track listing ==
Best Of, Volume One includes the following tracks.

No.	Title	Length
1.	"Ralph's Rhapsody"	4:43
2.	"The Music of What Happens"	4:04
3.	"The Oh of Pleasure"	5:22
4.	"Celestial Soda Pop"	4:40
5.	"Clouds Below Your Knees"	4:54
6.	"The Vanished Gardens of Córdoba"	8:24
7.	"The True Spirit of Mom & Dad"	8:06
8.	"The Temple"	8:03
9.	"Her Knees Deep in Your Mind"	6:18
10.	"Kathleen's Song"	4:08
11.	"Tiny Geometries"	6:06
12.	"Rio Clarifies"	0:06
13.	"Celestial Soda Pop [Remix]"	4:09

== Personnel ==
All music composed, arranged, and produced by Ray Lynch except The Oh of Pleasure which is co–written with Tom Canning.

- Ray Lynch – keyboards
- Mel McMurrin – sampled voices
- John Gregory – violin improvisations
- Tom Canning – Prophet 5 keyboards
- Geraldine Walther – viola
- David Kadarauch – cello
- Julie Ann Giacobassi – oboe and English horn
- Glen Fishthal – trumpet, flugelhorn and piccolo trumpet
- Timothy Day – flute
- David Krehbiel – French horn
- Daniel Kobialka – violin
- Nancy Severance – viola

== Charts ==
Chart (1998)	Position
Billboard New Age Albums	19
