= Nothing Above My Shoulders but the Evening =

Studio album by Ray Lynch
- Released: September 28, 1993
- Recorded: 1989–1993
- Genres: New age, classical
- Length: 44:16
- Label: Windham Hill Records
- Producer: Ray Lynch

Ray Lynch chronology
No Blue Thing (1989)	Nothing Above My Shoulders but the Evening (1993)	Best Of, Volume One (1998)

Professional ratings
Review scores
Source	Rating
Allmusic	4.5/5 stars
Encyclopedia of Popular Music	3/5 stars

Nothing Above My Shoulders but the Evening is American new-age musician Ray Lynch's fourth and final studio album, released on September 28, 1993. It reflects Lynch's classical background and features performances by members of the San Francisco Symphony. The album was released after Lynch signed with Windham Hill Records. It peaked at number 1 on Billboard's "Top New Age Albums" chart.

== Production ==
According to Keyboard, the album was originally slated to be released "during the first quarter" of 1992. In an interview with the Vancouver Sun, Lynch revealed some of the struggles he faced while creating the album, and said that it had taken four years to create. In regards to its delayed production, he said, "That's the problem when you love what you make, if you love what you make and care about it, you're going to struggle with it until it's right." In an interview with Brian, Mind in 1995, Ray Lynch explained that he shifted more closely to acoustic instruments than synthesized instruments. He further explained that he had always wanted to write a "very classical" album.

== Reception ==
Debbie Stover of the St. Louis Post-Dispatch praised the album for its use of instruments to recreate the sound of both the Baroque and Renaissance eras while also "managing to sound fully modern." Stover concluded her review by calling it "easily one of the year's best." Elisabeth Le Guin of The New York Times praised the album for evoking "the highly colored emotions of the classical tradition" and described the album's sound as "pop Dvorak".

== Track listing ==
Nothing Above My Shoulders but the Evening includes the following tracks. All tracks are written by Ray Lynch.

No.	Title	Length
1.	"Over Easy"	4:53
2.	"Her Knees Deep in Your Mind"	6:18
3.	"Passion Song"	5:24
4.	"Ivory"	5:38
5.	"Mesquite"	6:18
6.	"Only an Enjoyment"	7:16
7.	"The Vanished Gardens of Córdoba"	8:22

== Personnel ==
All music composed, arranged and produced by Ray Lynch.

- Ray Lynch – keyboards and guitars
- Timothy Day – flute and alto flute
- Nancy Ellis and Nanci Severance – viola
- Glen Fischthal – trumpet, fluglehorn, and piccolo trumpet
- Julie Ann Giacobassi – oboe and English horn
- David Kadarauch – cello
- Dave Krehbiel – French horn
- Daniel Kobialka – violin
- Marc Shapiro – piano

== Production ==
- Ray Lynch and Daniel Ryman – engineering and mixing
- design and building of Ray Lynch of Studio by Daniel Ryman
- Bernie Grundman Mastering, Hollywood, California – mastering
- Bernie Grundman and Daniel Ryman

== Charts ==
Chart (1993)	Position
Billboard New Age Albums	1
