= Daniel Kobialka =

American musician (1943–2021)

Daniel Kobialka (November 19, 1943 – January 18, 2021) was an American violinist, composer, and music entrepreneur.

== Biography ==
Kobialka studied violin at the Hartt College of Music. Kobialka was the principal second violinist with the San Francisco Symphony Orchestra from September 1975 to September 2008. He was also the founding concertmaster and soloist with San Francisco's Midsummer Mozart Festival Orchestra with George Cleve.

As a composer, Kobialka's Concerto for the Zeta-Polyphonic Electronic Violin premiered in March 1991. With the San Francisco Symphony, he gave both the American premiere of Toru Takemitsu's Far Calls, Coming Far, and the world premiere of Charles Wuorinen's Rhapsody. With the Atlanta Symphony Orchestra under Robert Shaw, he premiered Ben Weber’s Violin Concerto No. 1, dedicated to him. He also served as concertmaster for the premiere of Leonard Bernstein's Mass. In popular music, he played violin on several tracks on the 1975 rock album Ambrosia (by the band of the same name), including the solo on "Holdin' on to Yesterday".

Kobialka taught at Notre Dame University, and also at the University of the Incarnate Word. He was a recipient of the Medium Term Grant to study traditional and contemporary music by the Japanese government. Kobialka also served on Advisory Boards for Beam Foundation, Institute of Holistic Medicine, and Pacific Guqin Association.

Kobialka was commissioned to compose a film score for the "Split Horn" documentary Life of a Hmong Shaman in America, and wrote 10 orchestral and solo violin compositions for various instrumental combinations. His recorded solo artist albums include one for the Advance Recordings, and one for the Desto record label of original works dedicated to him by Lou Harrison, Henry Brant, and Glen Glassow, Donald Martino, and Arnold Franchetti. Over his career, he commissioned over 30 works from composers like Charles Wuorinen, William Bolcom, Wayne Peterson, George Rochberg, Vivian Fine, Arthur Custer, Meyer Kupferman, Marta Ptaszynska, Theodore Antoniou, Fred Fox, and Benjamin Lees.

== Company ==
Kobialka founded LiSem Enterprises Inc., in 1985, and created Wonder of Sound in 2009. His company focuses on new-age and classical instrumental music.

Formerly based in San Francisco, California, LiSem Enterprises Inc. is now headquartered in San Antonio, Texas, and has globally expanded. The LiSem label has produced music in various categories, such as relaxation, yoga, massage, meditation, therapy, energy and eclectic music.

== Discography ==
- Echoes of Secret Silence, b/w Nightmusic by Charles Shere. Oakland Symphony Youth Orchestra, Kent Nagano, musical director. 1750 Arch Records (1982)
- Pathless Journey: A Tribute to Toru Takemitsu
- Celtic Fantasy
- Celtic Quilt
- Rainbows
- When You Wish Upon A Star
- World On A String
- Dreams Beyond The Twilight
- Path of Joy (1982)
- Timeless Motion (1983)
- Fragrances Of A Dream
- Velvet Dreams
- Oh What A Beautiful Morning
- Going Home Again
- The Gift Of Love
- Silk Branches
- Peace: Musical Inspirations Series
- Lullaby
- Afternoon of a Faun
- In Heavenly Peace
- Colors of love
- Best Of, Volume One
- Nothing Above My Shoulders but the Evening
