= Music West Records =

Defunct independent record label

- Founded: December 1985
- Founder: Allan Kaplan
- Defunct: November 1991
- Status: Inactive
- Genre: Acoustic, new age, folk, ambient
- Country of origin: United States
- Location: San Rafael, California

Music West Records was an independent record company founded by Allan Kaplan in December 1985 in San Rafael, California. The company was initially formed to promote Ray Lynch, their first artist. During its run, artists released under the record company included Jim Chappell, Kenneth Nash, Chris Spheeris, and Øystein Sevåg. According to Gary Chappell, the manufacturer for Music West, the artists originated independently, claiming that the company's idea "has a statement that comes directly from the artist with no interference."

In 1991, the company attempted to break away from their "New Age" roots. In an interview with Billboard in April 1991, Kaplan said "I believe the new age category is shrinking rapidly, but the winning titles–maybe about 200 of them–will continue to sell more than ever." The company attempted to expand the company by releasing tracks from Sun Studios in Kaplan's hometown, Memphis, Tennessee. However, after a lawsuit by Ray Lynch for allegedly not paying him, the company was foreclosed by Security Pacific Bank in November 1991 with all of its assets sold by June 1992.

== Artists ==
- James Asher
- Teja Bell
- Jim Chappell
- Kimbal Dykes
- Ekimi
- Ray Lynch
- Kenneth Nash
- Windsor Riley
- Øystein Sevåg
- Mark Sloniker
- Dallas Smith
- Chris Spheeris
- The Telling
- Paul Voudouris
