= Jim Chappell =

American jazz musician (born 1955)

James William Chappell (born 1955 in Michigan), professionally known as Jim Chappell, is an American New Age and jazz pianist. During the late 1980s and early 1990s, Chappell placed five albums in the Top Twenty of Billboard's Top New Age Albums chart, and placed another album in the Top Twenty of their Top Contemporary Jazz Albums chart.

== Recording history ==
Chappell's first album, Tender Ritual, was a collection of piano solos released in 1985 on his own Unspeakable Freedom label. In 1986, Chappell was signed with the newly formed Music West Records. That same year, Chappell released Dusk, another collection of piano solos. It would be the first of Chappell's albums to appear on a Billboard chart, peaking at No. 19 on its Top New Age Albums chart.

With his third album, Chappell's records started to include small-ensemble accompaniment and (on 1990s Saturday's Rhapsody) full orchestration. His three albums in this style—1989's Living in the Northern Summer, Saturday's Rhapsody, and 1991's Nightsongs and Lullabies—all appeared on the Billboard Top New Age Albums chart.

In 1992, Chappell switched to the Real Music label, where his music became more jazz-oriented. There were four such albums—In Search of the Magic (1992), Over the Top (1993), Manila Nights (1994) and The Earthsea Series, Volume 1 (1994). On the latter three, Chappell was backed by HearSay, a jazz quartet. The first of them, 1993's Over the Top, appeared on Billboard's Top Contemporary Jazz Albums chart. This album was also successful in the Philippines, enough such that Chappell booked a three-date concert hall tour of the islands in the summer of 1993 and sold out all of the shows.

Chappell's final album with Real Music was 1994's Laughter at Dawn. It saw Chappell returning to his original style of solo piano and was the last of his albums to appear on a Billboard chart.

Chappell moved to Gallery Records in 1996 and recorded one album there. He released nothing further until 2002, when he began releasing albums on his own Unspeakable Freedom label. None of them have appeared on any Billboard charts.

== Critical reception ==
In his review of Chappell's Nightsongs and Lullabies, Jim Aikin noted that "Chappell's pastel piano meditations ... are the musical equivalent of airbrushed greeting-card watercolors of cute bunny rabbits and fawns." However, he went on to say that Chappell is "a consummate craftsman—a sensitive pianist and gifted melodist who knows some genuinely interesting chords."

In a review of one of Chappell's contemporary jazz albums, Jonathan Widran of AllMusic praised Over the Top for its "energetic live interaction" with fellow performers.

== Personal life ==
Chappell has a brother named Gary Chappell. Gary Chappell worked as a manufacturer for Music West Records.

== Discography ==
Album	Year	Label	Catalog #	Chart Performance				Reference
Album	Year	Label	Catalog #	US New Age		US Cont. Jazz		Reference
Album	Year	Label	Catalog #	Weeks	Peak	Weeks	Peak	Reference
Tender Ritual	1985	Music West	MW-131	–	–	-	–	–
Dusk	1986	Music West	MW-132	21	19	-	-	
Living the Northern Summer	1989	Music West	MW-133	33	5	-	-	
Saturday's Rhapsody	1990	Music West	MW-134	23	10	-	-	
Nightsongs and Lullabies	1991	Music West	MW-135	17	7	-	-	
In Search of the Magic	1992	Real Music	RM-0136	–	–	–	-	–
Over the Top	1993	Real Music	RM-0137	-	-		19	
Manila Nights	1994	Real Music	RM-0138	–	–	–	–	-
The Earthsea Series, Volume 1	1994	Real Music	RM-1160	–	–	–	–	–
Laughter at Dawn	1994	Real Music	RM-0139	5	19	-	-	
Acadia	1996	Gallery	GR-1001	–	–	–	–	–
Serenity Rush	2003	Unspeakable Freedom		–	–	-	–	–
Coming Through	2005	Unspeakable Freedom		–	–	-	–	–
Honey Wind	2007	Unspeakable Freedom		–	–	-	–	–
Sad Music Moods	2008	Unspeakable Freedom		–	–	-	–	–
Comfort Songs	2009	Unspeakable Freedom		–	–	-	–	–
Treasure At Seventeen	2009	Unspeakable Freedom		–	–	-	–	–
Rise	2009	Unspeakable Freedom		–	–	-	–	–
Panorama	2010	Unspeakable Freedom		–	–	-	–	–
Into the Fresh Beyond	2012	Unspeakable Freedom		–	–	-	–	–
Something to Turn To	2014	Unspeakable Freedom		–	–	-	–	–

When originally released on the Unspeakable Freedom label, Tender Ritual had catalog number RB-101.

Real Music re-released all five of the Music West albums. These re-releases have catalog numbers RM-0131 through RM-0135.
