= No Blue Thing =

Studio album by Ray Lynch
- Released: August 15, 1989
- Recorded: 1985–1989
- Studio: Ray Lynch's home studio Different Fur
- Genre: New-age
- Length: 39:21
- Label: Music West; Windham Hill Records (reissue)
- Producer: Ray Lynch

Ray Lynch chronology
| Deep Breakfast (1984) | No Blue Thing (1989) | Nothing Above My Shoulders but the Evening (1993) |

Professional ratings
Review scores
| Source | Rating |
|---|---|
| Allmusic | 3/5 stars |
| Encyclopedia of Popular Music | 3/5 stars |

No Blue Thing is American new-age musician Ray Lynch's third studio album, released on August 15, 1989. It peaked at number 1 on Billboard's "Top New Age Albums" chart as well as number 197 on Billboard's "Top 200 Albums". The album also peaked at number 16 on Gavin Report.

== Production ==
In an interview with Keyboard, Lynch said that he recorded between two and seven versions of the same song. Lynch also told Keyboard that "The True Spirit of Mom and Dad" took him about eight months to complete.

== Reception ==
Keith Tuber of Orange Coast praised the album, commenting that Ray Lynch "has a way with melodies, combining classical, acoustic and synthesized pop elements.". JA of Keyboard noted that some of the album is "more of the same" from Deep Breakfast; JA wrote that the "DX patches have a little more bit this time, but the trick of running staccato patterns through a delay line in triplet rhythm hadn't changed" and that the album, like his previous works, lack percussion instruments. Robert Carlberg of Electronic Musician compared the album to Reed Maidenberg's Unexpected Beauty, praising the album for its combination of electronic and acoustic instruments but criticizing it for having an overreliance of arpeggiations as well as its use of "plodding" time signatures and for its "warm, fuzzy" instrumentation. Carlberg concluded that the album's flaws "rob [both Lynch and Maidenberg] of whatever vitality classical training would bring." John Diliberto of Jazziz Magazine criticized the album, calling it formulaic and concluded that the album "breaks no new ground". Gavin Report wrote that each track on the album is worthy of the listener's attention, especially "The True Spirit of Mom & Dad", which was described as the "climactic final track" of the album.

== Track listing ==
No Blue Thing includes the following tracks.

| No. | Title | Length |
|---|---|---|
| 1. | "No Blue Thing" | 5:37 |
| 2. | "Clouds Below Your Knees" | 4:53 |
| 3. | "Here and Never Found" | 4:46 |
| 4. | "Drifted in a Deeper Land" | 7:27 |
| 5. | "Homeward at Last" | 3:38 |
| 6. | "Evenings, Yes" | 4:52 |
| 7. | "The True Spirit of Mom & Dad" | 8:03 |

== Personnel ==
All music composed, arranged, and produced by Ray Lynch.

- Ray Lynch – keyboards, classical guitar
- Tom Canning – "guitar" keyboards on "Clouds Below Your Knees"
- Timothy Day – flute
- Julie Ann Giacobassi – oboe and English horn
- Amy Hiraga – violin
- David Kadarauch and Peter Wyrick – cello
- Basil Vendryes and Geraldine Walther – viola

=== Production ===
- Mastered by Bernie Grundman and Daniel Ryman at (Bernie Grundman Mastering, Hollywood, California)
- Mixed by Ray Lynch and Daniel Ryman at Ray Lynch Productions studio (designed and built by Daniel Ryman)except for “Evenings, Yes” (Recorded at Different Fur, San Francisco; engineered by Howard Johnston; mixed at Mobius, San Francisco)

== Charts ==
| Chart (1989) | Position |
|---|---|
| Billboard New Age Albums | 1 |
| Billboard 200 | 197 |
