= Edgar Oliver =

American actor and writer

Edgar Oliver (born October 31, 1956) is an American stage and film actor, poet, performance artist and playwright. He is considered a "legend" of the lower Manhattan theater scene and is known for his distinctive accent and diction.

== Early life ==
Edgar Oliver was born in Savannah, Georgia, the son of Edgar Joseph Oliver Jr. and Mary Louise Gibson. His father died of a morphine overdose in Dallas, Texas, before he was born. He and his older sister Helen, now a painter, were raised by their mother, residing on 36th Street. Louise died when he was 27 years old.

Both Oliver siblings attended the 37th Street School and the Cathedral School as elementary students. Later, Edgar studied at Benedictine Military School while Helen was at St. Vincent's Academy for Girls. Both were valedictorians of their classes—1974 and 1973, respectively— at their respective Catholic schools.

At a live The Moth event, recorded on January 25, 2006, Oliver recalled how he and Helen escaped their eccentric mother by running away to Paris using their trust money from their deceased father. Their mother chased them in her car when they tried leaving. They ran away the first summer after they started college at George Washington University.

== Career ==
Oliver first started performing in New York City at the Pyramid Club in the mid-1980s. Notable New York City productions include his roles in Edward II with Cliplight Theater, and numerous productions at the Axis Theatre Company, including A Glance at New York and his autobiographical one-man show East 10th Street: Self Portrait With Empty House, which enjoyed an extended run with Axis.

His film credits include The Jimmy Show and Henry May Long. He appeared in the Jared Hess film Gentlemen Broncos and had the leading role as a futurist performance artist in the comedy feature That's Beautiful Frank. He is also a frequent storyteller for The Moth radio program.

Oliver has written at least a dozen plays, "including The Poetry Killers, The Ghost of Brooklyn, When She Had Blood Lust, The Master of Monstrosity, I Am A Coffin, My Green Hades, and Chop Off Your Ear". These have often been produced at La MaMa ETC; most notably, the 2000 production of his play The Drowning Pages starred Debbie Harry.

Oliver has published two poetry collections: A Portrait of New York by a Wanderer There, Summer, and the novel The Man Who Loved Plants. His style has been "characterized as 19th century romantic".

Oliver has also gained cult fame, appearing on the Science Channel series Oddities and was notable for his line, "Is that a straitjacket?", which was featured in the show's promos. He hosts the spin-off show Odd Folks Home.

On November 26, 2011, Third Man Records released a tricolor 45 RPM single of his "In The Park". Only 150 copies were produced. Fifty were sold at Third Man Records in Nashville, Tennessee, and fifty at Obscura in New York. Fifty copies were mailed at random out to those who ordered the unlimited black vinyl version.

His show East 10th Street: Self Portrait With Empty House won a Fringe First Award at Edinburgh Festival Fringe in 2009, competing against 750 shows.

== Personal life ==
Oliver has lived in the East Village of New York City since 1977. At one point, he lived in an apartment on the top floor of a building with no other occupants but has since relocated.

On April 30, 2011, at another The Moth event, he related further adventures of his, when he, Helen, and a friend Jason traveled to Tangier, Morocco, to meet author Paul Bowles.

== Bibliography ==
=== Critical studies and reviews ===
- Als, Hilton (June 2, 2014). "Cruising : Edgar Oliver's park stories". The Critics. The Theatre. The New Yorker. Vol. 90, no. 15. pp. 80–81.
