= The Knee Of Listening =

1972 book by Adi Da

- Cover of the 2007 edition
- Author: Adi Da
- Language: English
- Subjects: Spirituality
- Publisher: Dawn Horse Press
- Publication date: 1972
- Publication place: United States
- Media type: Print (Hardcover and Paperback)
- Followed by: The Method of the Siddhas: Talks with Franklin Jones on the Spiritual Technique of the Saviors of Mankind

The Knee Of Listening is a "spiritual autobiography" by Adi Da (born Franklin Jones), a spiritual teacher who authored more than 75 books during his life, including those published posthumously. The book was originally published in 1972, when Adi Da was 33, and was subtitled "The Early Life and Radical Spiritual Teachings of Franklin Jones". It includes a foreword by the well-known spiritual philosopher Alan Watts. The book went through numerous editions throughout the life of its author, the latest being published in 2004 with the full title, The Knee Of Listening: The Divine Ordeal of The Avataric Incarnation of Conscious Light.

== History ==
Adi Da wrote prolifically about his spiritual philosophy, creating the Dawn Horse Press in 1973 to publish his books. of which The Knee Of Listening was the best known. First published in 1972, it has been reissued in a number of editions, undergoing extensive revisions and additions.

Adi Da published several expanded editions in 1973, 1978, and 1984. His further revisions were published in 1992, 1995 (subtitled "The Early-Life Ordeal and the Radical Spiritual Realization of the Divine World-Teacher, Adi Da (The Da Avatar))", and in 2004.

== Content ==
=== Forewords ===
The original foreword by Alan Watts has been described as "classic Watts, cautioning against any one definitive process of spiritual illumination and yet locating himself amongst the signposts of both the practices of Theravada Buddhism and esoteric G. I. Gurdjieff". Watts, on studying Adi Da's teachings, had reportedly declared, "It looks like we have an avatar here. I've been waiting for one all my life". In a separate endorsement of The Knee Of Listening, Watts wrote: "It is obvious, from all sorts of subtle details, that he knows what IT's all about… a rare being". The 2004 republication featured a foreword, by South Asian religion scholar Jeffrey J. Kripal, describing Adi Da's total corpus as being "the most doctrinally thorough, the most philosophically sophisticated, the most culturally challenging, and the most creatively original literature currently available in the English language".

=== Text ===
In the book, Adi Da states that he "was born in a state of perfect freedom and awareness of ultimate reality", which he called "the Bright", and that he "sacrificed that reality at the age of two, so that he could completely identify with the limitations and mortality of suffering humanity" in order to discover ways to help others "awaken to the unlimited and deathless happiness of the Heart". He wrote in the book that he had uniquely been born with full awareness of "the Bright," but this knowledge became obscured in childhood, with his subsequent spiritual journey being a quest to recapture this awareness, and share it with others.

The first edition was 271 pages long; the latest is 821, published when Adi Da was 65 years old, and discussing his spiritual process as it unfolded over the 30 years since the first edition.

== Reception ==
In his review of The Knee Of Listening, author and philosopher Michael R. Starks said: "The sticker on the cover of some editions says, 'The most profound spiritual autobiography of all time' and this might well be true. Certainly, it is by far the fullest and clearest account of the process of enlightenment I have ever seen. Even if you have no interest at all in the most fascinating of all human psychological processes, it is an amazing document that reveals a great deal about religion, yoga, and human psychology and probes the depths and limits of human possibilities".

Adi Da heavily edited subsequent editions of the book. Reviewer Scott Lowe asserted that "in later editions, Jones' childhood is presented as utterly exceptional...It is clear that Jones' autobiography might best be understood as a kind of auto-hagiography, since its purpose is to preserve for posterity a sanitized, mythologized, and highly selective account of Jones' life and spiritual adventures". Indologist Georg Feuerstein wrote that "the original published version has the ring of authenticity and can be appreciated as a remarkable mystical document", but found that "[l]ater [editions], regrettably, tend toward mythologization".

Other endorsements provided in the 2004 edition of The Knee Of Listening include Sufi teacher and author Irina Tweedie, who wrote: "I regard Adi Da Samraj as one of the greatest teachers in the Western world today"; and author and publisher Richard Grossinger, who wrote: "Adi Da Samraj has spoken directly to the heart of our human situation—the shocking gravity of our brief and unbidden lives. Through his words, I have experienced a glimmering of eternal life, and view my own existence as timeless and spaceless in a way that I never had before".

Elizabeth Targ, M.D., Director of the Complimentary Medicine Research Institute, University of California, San Francisco, wrote: "Adi Da and his unique body of teaching work offer a rare and extraordinary opportunity for those courageous students who are ready to move beyond ego and take the plunge into deepest communion with the Absolute. Importantly, the teaching is grounded in explicit discussion of necessary psycho-spiritual evolution and guides the student to self-responsibility and self-awareness". Author and host of the national public television series, Thinking Allowed, Jeffrey Mishlove wrote: "I regard the work of Adi Da and his devotees as one of the most penetrating spiritual and social experiments happening on the planet in our era".
