= Gabriel Cousens =

American physician

Gabriel Kenneth Cousens
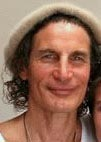
- Cousens in 2007
- Born: Kenneth Gabriel Cousens; May 14, 1943 (age 83); Chicago, Illinois, U.S.
- Education: Amherst College (1965); Columbia Medical School (1969)
- Medical career
- Profession: Homeopath
- Sub-specialties: Homeopathy, raw foodism

Gabriel (born May 14, 1943) is an American homeopath, self-proclaimed rabbi and practitioner of holistic medicine. In 1976, Cousens legally changed his name from Kenneth Gabriel Cousens to Gabriel. Cousens advocates live foods therapy, a nutritional regimen which he says can cure diabetes, depression and other chronic degenerative diseases. He is the founder of the "Essene Order of Light", a spiritual organization based upon teachings from the Jewish Kabbalah, the Torah, and modern interpretations of the Essenes. The Essenes are a mystical group from the second century B.C.E. who lived in community, eschewed materialism and grew their own food. The modern Essene movement was founded by Edmond Bordeaux Szekely, a religious scholar who promoted a simple holistic lifestyle of meditation and raw vegan eating and published several books on the Essenes in the early 20th century. Essene Order of Light is taught by Cousens at "Tree of Life Foundation," an organization directed by Cousens and headquartered at its "Tree of Life Rejuvenation Center" in Patagonia, Arizona. Cousens has authored nine books and tours internationally promoting his ideas on food and his spiritual beliefs.

== Early life and education ==
Cousens grew up in Highland Park, Illinois. As a freshman at Amherst College, he designed a heart lung machine and spent two summers doing leukemia research. He graduated from Amherst College in 1965 with a B.A. in biology, where he was a football lineman/guard/middle linebacker and co-captain of the 1964 football team. That year he received a National Football Foundation National Scholar-Athlete Award. He earned his medical degree from Columbia Medical School in 1969, and he completed his residency in psychiatry in 1973.

Cousens says he switched to a vegetarian diet around age 30, after which he began teaching meditation. In 1974 he went to India to study with the swami Muktananda (1908-1982), staying for seven years. He returned to the United States in 1981 and studied Kabbalah and the Essenes, becoming ordained in 1988.

== Tree of Life Foundation and Rejuvenation Center ==
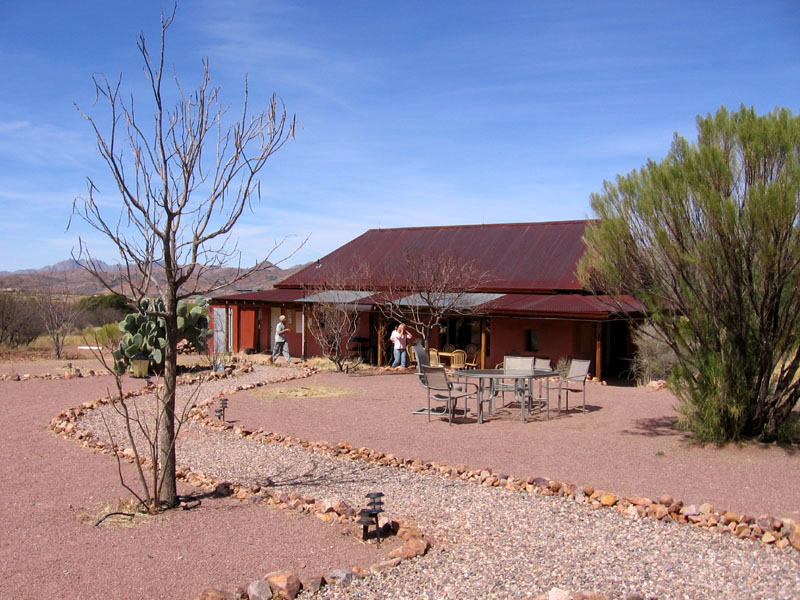
The Tree of Life's restaurant in Patagonia, Arizona

Cousens founded the Essene Order of Light in 1992, and the following year he established the Tree of Life Foundation as a federal tax-exempt religious organization. The Tree of Life Rejuvenation Center, located in Patagonia, Arizona, was founded in 1994 as a health retreat which offers raw food education, fasting, and nutrition. Cousens is an ordained Rabbi and offers workshops on spiritual Judaism. His newest book, Torah as a Guide to Enlightenment, published through North Atlantic Books, is a commentary on the Torah from a Kabbalistic perspective. Cousens founded a not for profit organization called the Essene Order of Light which teaches "modern Essene living". He outlined his philosophy in his book Creating Peace By Being Peace.

Cousens has advocated a raw food diet for babies and children. He instituted a study of the medical history of infants and children and advocates for raw food education. A 2009 documentary, Simply Raw, followed six people with diabetes who go through a thirty-day raw vegan program in an attempt to cure their disease with a raw food diet and without drugs. Surgeon and alternative medicine critic David Gorski said that Cousens and the film both grossly misrepresented the modern medical approach to diabetes. Gorski described Cousens works as promoting vitalism and other discredited principles.

== Legal actions ==
In 1994, California revoked his license to practice for "excessive prescribing", but based on a form of plea bargain this revocation was stayed for three years probation. In consequence of the California decision, New York also required him to return his license. Cousens' license in California was later reinstated, but not in New York. Because of this, he is not eligible for a medical license in Arizona.

In 1998, 57-year-old Charles Levy of New Jersey died after being treated at the center over a five-day period. The cause of death was determined by the Santa Cruz County Medical Examiner, who along with the Arizona Medical Board attributed the death to a gas gangrene infection caused by "bovine adrenal fluid" injections given by Cousens as part of a treatment for fatigue. The autopsy also found that Levy had hepatitis, encephalomyelitis, and coronary atherosclerosis. Levy's son said that his father was healthy, able to run three miles, not overweight, and had no high blood pressure at the time of his visit to the spa, and the family sued for malpractice. Cousens settled the suit for an undisclosed amount paid to the family. The case came up before the Arizona Board of Homeopathic Medical Examiners in 2001. Despite the medical examiner's report and testimony, then Board Chairman Bruce Shelton said he "found no medical fault with Dr. Cousens' care of" Levy and the board found "no violation of homeopathic law" in Cousens' treatment. Cousens argued that the medical examiner had misdiagnosed the cause of death, which he said was toxic shock unrelated to the injections, a claim that the Levy family attorney called "outrageous".

== Works ==
- Conscious Eating. Vision Books International, 1994

2nd edition North Atlantic Books, 2000 OCLC 40311543

- Tachyon Energy: A New Paradigm in Holistic Healing, with David Wagner. North Atlantic Books, 1999 OCLC 45162219
- Depression-Free For Life: An All-Natural, Five-Step Plan to Reclaim Your Zest for Living, with Mark Mayell. William Morrow & Co., 2000 OCLC 46801470
- Rainbow Green Live-Food Cuisine, North Atlantic Books, 2003 OCLC 52377528
- Spiritual Nutrition: Six Foundations for Spiritual Life and the Awakening of Kundalini. North Atlantic Books, 2005.
- Creating Peace by Being Peace: the Essene Sevenfold Path, North Atlantic Books, 2008 OCLC 192109603
- Torah as a Guide to Enlightenment, North Atlantic Books, 2011 OCLC 687655506
- There is a Cure for Diabetes, Revised Edition: The 21-Day+ Holistic Recovery Program, North Atlantic Books, 2013 OCLC 799024775
- Conscious Parenting: The Holistic Guide to Raising and Nourishing Healthy, Happy Children, with Leah Lynn. North Atlantic Books, 2015
