= Cymbiosis =

Music magazine

- Volume 2, Issue 1; 1988
- Editor: Ric Levine
- Categories: Music
- Frequency: Quarterly
- Format: Journal, magazine
- First issue: July/August 1986
- Final issue Number: December 1988; 5
- Country: United States
- Based in: West Covina, CA
- Language: English
- ISSN: 0895-6936

Cymbiosis was a music magazine that lasted from 1986 to 1988. Since the magazine was released with either a cassette or a CD, its tagline was "The marriage of music and magazine".

== History ==
The magazine was conceived by free-lance music journalist Ric Levine in early 1985 while at a restaurant. The magazine contained interviews, reviews, and opinions regarding musicians associated with progressive rock, jazz fusion, and new age, though the magazine would stray to other categories deemed "innovative". The magazine also contained a complimentary cassette that includes the music covered within the magazine. In regards to the Magazine's packing, Levine told Guitar Player that the packing for the first issue "looks like a videocassette box, which caused some confusion" and that the packing was expensive at the time; the subsequent issues featured a blister pack where both the magazine and cassette are visible. Levine, alongside his wife Deborah, attempted to publish the magazine nationwide. At the peak of the magazine's run, Cymbiosis was available in 37 states and in 13 countries. However, in 1988, Levine put the magazine out of the market after four issues to rethink his efforts. In December 1988, Levine reintroduced the magazine format with CDs instead of cassettes, released the magazine as a CD booklet, and increased the length of the magazine from 48 pages to 130 pages; the magazine was also distributed by A&M Records. Only one issue was released under the new format.

== Reception ==
Flipside wrote that the magazine's steep cover price would "appeal only to yuppies who could afford it" and that the magazine features "very few strong hooks". However, Flipside opined that the musicians featured in the magazine are great for their genre.
