= Chris Spheeris =

Greek-American composer

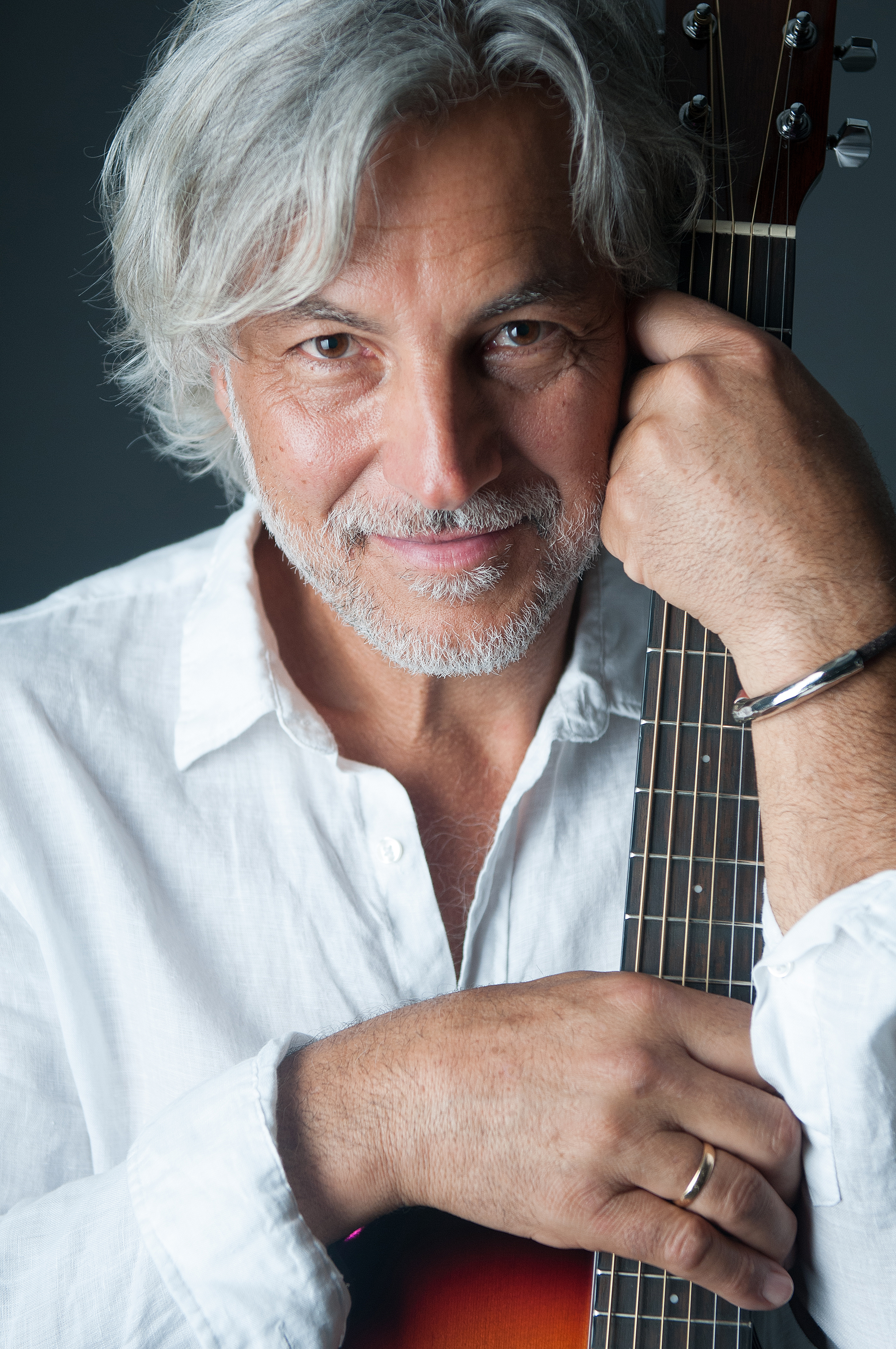
Spheeris in 2016

Chris Spheeris (/ˈsfɪərɪs/; Greek: Χρήστος Σφυρής) is an American composer of instrumental music. He is a producer, vocalist and multi-instrumentalist. Chris is the cousin of Penelope Spheeris and her brother Jimmie Spheeris. Born in Milwaukee, Wisconsin, Chris began writing songs on his guitar as a teenager. In 1985, Chris began composing for film. His work in collaboration with filmmaker Chip Duncan includes the television series Is Anyone Listening, the series Mystic Lands (Discovery Networks), In a Just World (PBS) and the classroom production entitled The Life & Death of Glaciers (Discovery Education).

== Discography ==
=== Albums ===
- 1978 - Spheeris and Voudouris
- 1980 - Points of View
- 1982 - Primal Tech Music
- 1984 – Desires of the heart
- 1988 – Pathways to surrender
- 1990 – Enchantment (with Paul Voudouris)
- 1993 – Culture
- 1994 – Desires
- 1994 – Passage
- 1995 – Europa
- 1996 – Mystic traveller
- 1997 – Eros
- 1999 – Dancing with the Muse
- 2001 – Adagio
- 2001 – Brio
- 2011 – Maya (and the Eight Illusions)
- 2013 – Respect
- 2014 – Across Any Distance
- 2019 - Mujeres al Alba

=== Compilations ===
- 1998 – Crystal Dreams
- 2000 – Platinum 2Cd
- 2001 – Best Dreams Mystic Hits Vol 18
- 2001 – The Best 1990–2000
- 2004 – Mediterranean Cafe
- 2005 – Essentials
- 2009 – Greatest Hits

=== Singles ===
- 2000 – Allura
- 2021 – Hear to Here
