= Mark Sloniker =

American musician

Mark Sloniker is an American new age and jazz musician. He released several albums on Fahrenheit Records in the early 1990s, and his music was played on The Weather Channel. He writes music for nature and religion. His well-known instrumental songs are "Bright Wish" and "Harpo's tune".

== Biography ==
=== Early years ===
Mark Sloniker was born and grew up in Cincinnati, Ohio. His grandfather worked for The Baldwin Piano Company. Mark was so obsessed with playing piano all day and all night that his mother would sometimes call the firefighters to get him off the piano.

Sloniker took piano lessons at an early age. He didn't like reading black music dots and try to hear them and would say "How is it they call this music? I can't hear a thing." He would rather play by ear by listening to the radio or listen to the movie soundtrack.

Later on Sloniker would be inspired by the Hollywood actor Ron Howard and the trombone player Winthrop. He played the Trombone from 5th grade and throughout high school. He still practiced the piano.

=== Career ===
Sloniker later enrolled at the University of Cincinnati and finished his trombone lessons. He went to various colleges. He played at concerts and joined the Jazz fusion group Kinesis. He finally earned his Music Therapy degree. He also married his wife Colleen Crosson and they each made their own music. His first new age, jazz music is "Paths of Heart", released on cassette and CD album made in 1986. Since then his songs were on the billboard chart around the world. Since then he continued to make more New-age music like "True Nature" in 1988. Some of his songs can be heard in The Weather Channel Fall Foliage reports or on the locals. His latest CD album is the 2009 "Miracles and Other Works of Heart" that both he and his wife Colleen Crosson worked on. His songs include "The Cellphone Blues" which talks about how he disliked the distraction of technology and "Oil Can" which focused on his interest in books and movies like The Wizard of Oz and To Kill a Mockingbird. He also talks about Christianity in his songs.

== Discography ==
- Paths of Heart- 1986
- True Nature- 1988
- Perfectly Human- 1991
- Do Watcha Love- 1995
- The Night of Black and White- 2005
- Miracles and other works of heart- 2009
