= CD Review =

Discontinued American monthly magazine

- First issue of CD Review (as Digital Audio), September 1984
- Editor: Larry Canale
- Categories: Music magazine
- Frequency: Monthly
- First issue: September 1984; 41 years ago
- Final issue Number: May 1996; 141
- Company: WGE Pub
- Country: United States
- Based in: Peterborough, NH
- Language: English
- ISSN: 1041-8342

CD Review (formerly known as Digital Audio and Digital Audio and Compact Disc Review) is a discontinued American monthly magazine that specialized in reviewing albums and audio electronics, especially compact discs. The magazine was founded by publisher Wayne Green. The magazine lasted from September 1984 to May 1996.

== History ==
In the first issue of CD Review (as Digital Audio), Ken Pohlmann, columnist for Audio and assistant professor at the University of Miami, introduced the magazine's purpose. Pohlmann wrote, "This monthly column will examine the professional side of digital audio, offering slices of insight and wisdom, as well as gossip from the recording studio and the manufacturers that equip it. In this way, the listening community will understand the sometimes invisible origins of recorded music." Pohlmann also wrote that CD sales would eventually outsell LPs and would eventually become "the dominant medium for home, car, and portable listening." Among the first reviews for the magazine include Abbey Road by the Beatles, Synchronicity by the Police, The Key by Joan Armatrading, and Secret Messages by Electric Light Orchestra, all of which were released on compact discs.
