= Adi Da =

American spiritual teacher (1939–2008)

Adi Da Samraj
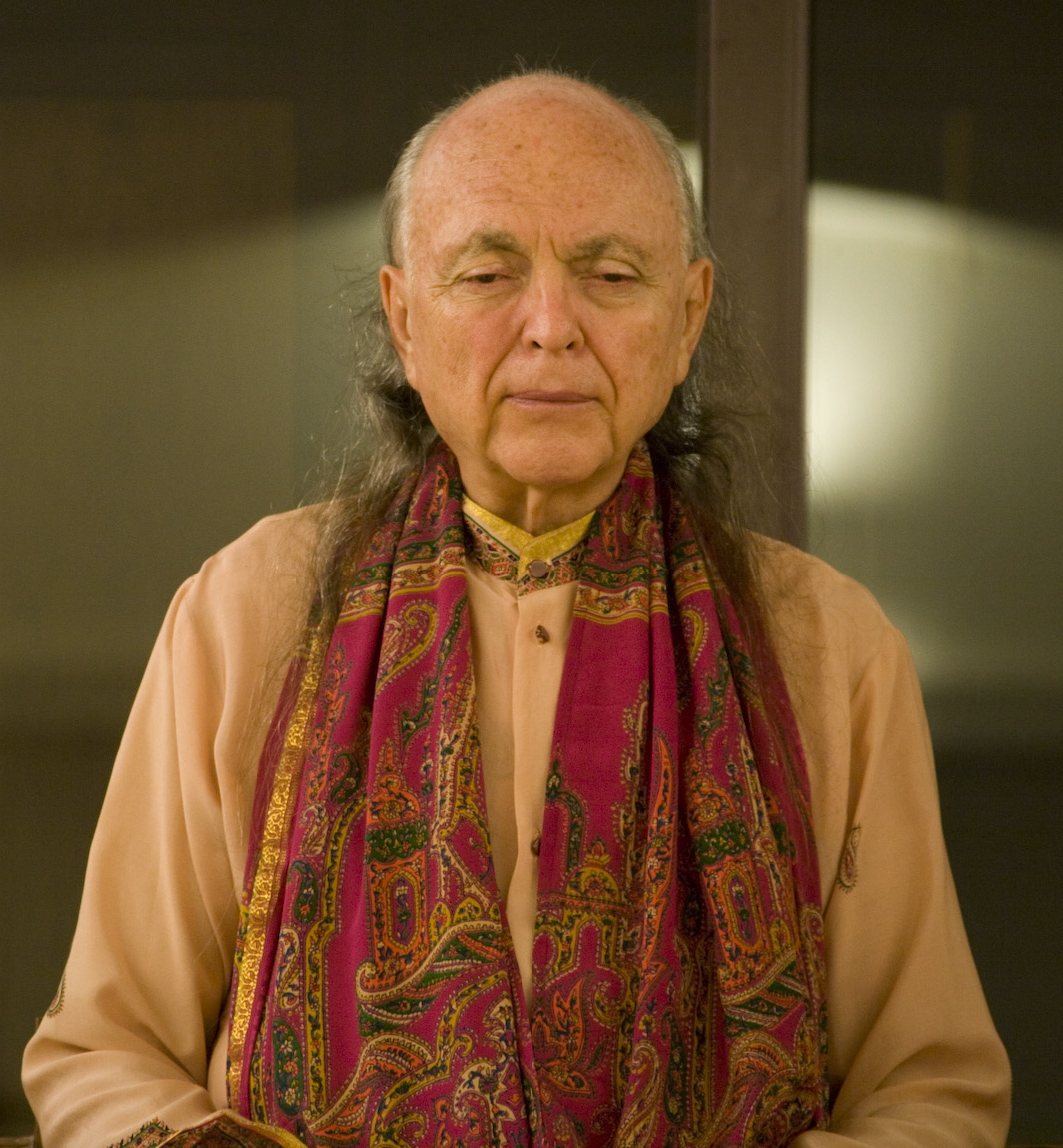
- Photograph of Adi Da Samraj, Nov. 3, 2008.
- Born: Franklin Albert Jones; November 3, 1939; New York, New York, U.S.
- Died: November 27, 2008 (aged 69); Naitauba, Lau Islands, Fiji
- Other names: Bubba Free John, Da Free John, Da Love-Ananda, Da Avabhasa, Adi Da Love-Ananda Samraj
- Education: Columbia University; Stanford University
- Occupations: Spiritual teacher, writer, and artist
- Known for: Founder of Adidam
- Children: Four, including Shawnee Free Jones

Adi Da Samraj (born Franklin Albert Jones; November 3, 1939 – November 27, 2008) was an American-born spiritual teacher, writer and artist. He was the founder of a new religious movement known as Adidam.

Adi Da became known in the spiritual counterculture of the 1970s for his books, public talks, and the activities of his religious community. He authored more than 75 books, including those published posthumously, with key works including an autobiography, The Knee Of Listening, spiritual works such as The Aletheon and The Dawn Horse Testament, and social philosophy such as Not-Two Is Peace.

Adi Da's teaching is closely related to the Indian tradition of nondualism. He taught that the 'ego'—the presumption of a separate self—is an illusion, and that all efforts to "attain" enlightenment or unity with the divine from that point-of-view are necessarily futile. Reality or Truth, he said, is "always already the case": it cannot be found through any form of seeking, it can only be "realized" through transcendence of the illusions of separate self in the devotional relationship to the already-realized being. Distinguishing his teaching from other religious traditions, Adi Da declared that he was a uniquely historic avatar and that the practice of devotional recognition-response to him, in conjunction with most fundamental self-understanding, was the sole means of awakening to seventh stage spiritual enlightenment for others.

Adi Da founded the publishing house Dawn Horse Press to print his books. He was praised by authorities in spirituality, philosophy, sociology, literature, and art, but was also criticized for what were perceived as his isolation and controversial behavior. In 1985, former followers made allegations of misconduct: two lawsuits were filed, to which Adidam responded with threats of counter-litigation. The principal lawsuit was dismissed and the other was settled out of court.

In his later years, Adi Da focused on creating works of art intended to enable viewers to enter into a "space" beyond limited "points of view". He was invited to the 2007 Venice Biennale to participate through a collateral exhibition, and was later invited to exhibit his work in Florence, Italy, in the 15th century Cenacolo di Ognissanti and the Bargello museum. His work was also shown in New York, Los Angeles, Amsterdam, Miami, and London.

== Biography ==
=== Youth and formal education (1939–1964) ===
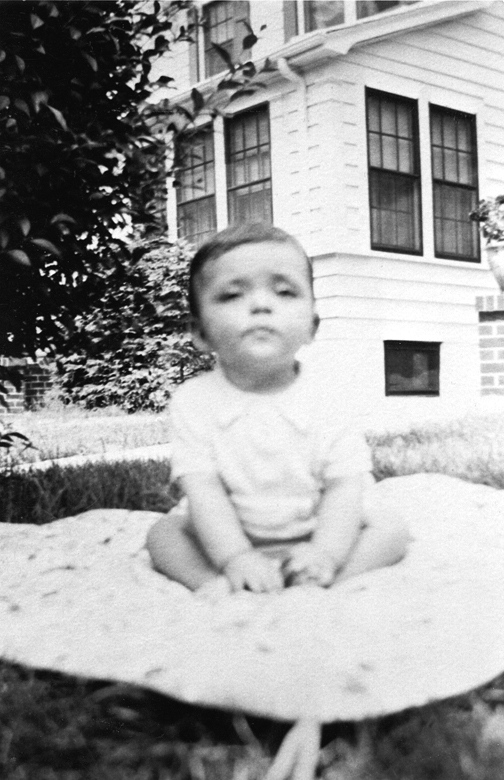
Adi Da as an infant, 1940

Born in Queens, New York and raised on Long Island, his father was a salesman and his mother a housewife. Adi Da claimed in his autobiography, The Knee Of Listening, that he "was born in a state of perfect freedom and awareness of ultimate reality", which he called the "Bright", and that he "sacrificed that reality at the age of two, so that he could completely identify with the limitations and mortality of suffering humanity" in order to discover ways to help others "awaken to the unlimited and deathless happiness of the Heart". A sister, Joanne, was born when he was eight years old. He served as an acolyte in the Lutheran church during his adolescence and aspired to be a minister, but after leaving for college in the autumn of 1957, expressed doubts about the religion to his Lutheran pastor. Adi Da attended Columbia University where he graduated in 1961 with a bachelor's degree in philosophy. He went on to complete a master's degree in English literature at Stanford University in 1963, under the guidance of novelist and historian Wallace Stegner. His master's thesis was "a study of core issues in modernism, focused on Gertrude Stein and the leading painters of the same period".

During and after his postgraduate studies, Adi Da engaged in an experiment of exhaustive writing, a process in which he wrote continuously for eight or more hours daily, as a kind of "yoga" where every movement of conscious awareness, all experiences, internal or external, were monitored and recorded. In this exercise, he felt that he discovered a structure or "myth" that governed all human conscious awareness, a "schism in Reality" that was the "logic (or process) of separation itself, of enclosure and immunity, the source of all presumed self-identity". He understood this to be the same logic hidden in the ancient Greek myth of Narcissus, the adored child of the gods, who was condemned to the contemplation of his own image and suffered the fate of eternal separateness. He concluded that the "death of Narcissus" was required to fulfill what he felt was the guiding purpose of his life, which was to awaken to the "Spiritually 'Bright' Condition of Consciousness Itself" that was prior to Narcissus, and communicate this awakening to others.

In the context of this exploration of consciousness in 1963, Adi Da experimented with various hallucinogenic and other drugs. For 6 weeks he was a paid test subject in drug trials of mescaline, LSD, and psilocybin conducted at a Veterans Administration hospital in California. He wrote later that he found these experiences "self-validating" in that they mimicked ecstatic states of consciousness from his childhood, but problematic as they often resulted in paranoia, anxiety, or disassociation. While living with the support of his girlfriend, Nina Davis, in the hills of Palo Alto, he continued to write, meditated informally, and studied books by C.G. Jung, H.P. Blavatsky, and Edgar Cayce, in order to make sense of his experiences.

=== Spiritual exploration (1964–1970) ===
In June 1964, Adi Da responded to an intuitive impulse to leave California in search of a spiritual teacher in New York City. Settling in Greenwich Village, he became a student of Albert Rudolph, also known as "Rudi", a dealer in Asian art who had been a disciple of the Indian guru Bhagavan Nityananda. When Nityananda died in 1961, Rudi became a student of Siddha Yoga's founder Swami Muktananda, who gave him the name "Swami Rudrananda". Having studied a number of spiritual traditions, including "The Work" of G.I. Gurdjieff and Subud, Rudi taught an eclectic blend of techniques he called "kundalini yoga" (although it was not related to the Indian tradition by that name).

Feeling that Adi Da needed better grounding, Rudi insisted that he marry Nina, find steady employment, improve his physical health, end his drug use, and begin preparatory studies to enter the seminary. As a student at Philadelphia's Lutheran Theological Seminary in 1967, Adi Da described undergoing a terrifying breakdown. Taken to a hospital emergency room, a psychiatrist diagnosed it as an anxiety attack. It was the first of a number of such episodes, each followed by what he described as profound awakenings or insights. He described the episodes as a kind of "death" or release from identity with the presumed separate persona, after which there was only "an Infinite Bliss of Being, an untouched, unborn Sublimity—without separation, without individuation. There was only Reality Itself … the unqualified living condition of the totality of conditionally manifested existence". A comparable pre-awakening process had been described by the renowned Indian sage Ramana Maharshi. Feeling none of his Lutheran professors understood this experience, Adi Da left and briefly attended St. Vladimir's Russian Orthodox Seminary in Tuckahoe, New York. Disillusioned, he moved back to New York City and found employment with Pan American Airlines, hoping this might help him fulfill his desire to visit Swami Muktananda's ashram in India.

Swami Muktananda, a disciple of Bhagavan Nityananda, was a well-known guru who had brought his tradition of Kashmir Shaivism to the West, establishing meditation centers around the world. Adi Da received formal permission to visit the ashram for four days in April 1968. Muktananda encouraged him to end his studies with Rudi and study with himself directly. In his autobiography, Adi Da related how he was granted shaktipat initiation, the awakening of the Kundalini Shakti that is said to reside at the base of the spine, which deepens the practice of Siddha Yoga meditation. Adi Da described experiencing an awakening to the Witness consciousness, beyond identification with the point of view of bodily consciousness. He began to study formally with Swami Muktananda.

After returning to New York, Adi Da and Nina became members and then employees of the Church of Scientology, leaving after a little more than a year of involvement. Adi Da returned to India for a month-long visit in early 1969, during which he received a handwritten (and formally translated) letter from Swami Muktananda, granting him the spiritual names Dhyanananda and Love-Ananda, and authorizing him to initiate others into Siddha Yoga. In May 1970, Adi Da, Nina, and a friend named Pat Morley traveled to India for what they believed would be an indefinite period living at Swami Muktananda's ashram. However, Adi Da was disappointed by his experience there, especially by the institutionalization of the ashram and the large numbers of westerners who had arrived since his previous visit. Three weeks after arriving, he visited the burial place of Bhagavan Nityananda and, by his account, received an immense transmission of the Shakti-Force. According to his autobiography, he began—to his great surprise—to see visions of the Virgin Mary (which he interpreted as a personification of the divine feminine power, or shakti). The vision of Mary directed him to make a pilgrimage to Christian holy sites. After embarking on a two-week pilgrimage to holy places in Europe and the Middle East, he, Nina and Pat returned to New York. In August 1970, they moved to Los Angeles.

=== Becoming a spiritual teacher (1970–1973) ===
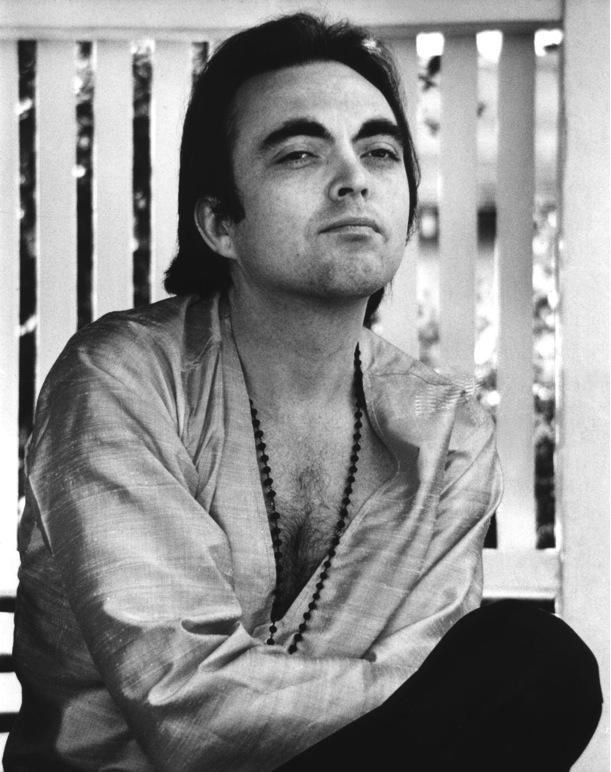
Adi Da in Los Angeles, 1973

Adi Da wrote in his autobiography that in September 1970, while sitting in the Vedanta Society Temple in Hollywood, he awakened fully into the state of perfect spiritual enlightenment that he called "The Bright". He wrote that although he had been born with full awareness of "the Bright", this awareness became obscured in childhood, and his subsequent spiritual journey had been a quest to recapture it, and share it with others. The autobiography, entitled The Knee Of Listening, was published in 1972. It included a foreword by the well-known spiritual philosopher Alan Watts, who on studying Adi Da's teachings had reportedly said, "It looks like we have an avatar here. I've been waiting for such a one all my life". In the foreword, he wrote: "It is obvious, from all sorts of subtle details, that he knows what IT's all about… a rare being".

In The Knee Of Listening and subsequent books, Adi Da spoke of "Consciousness Itself" as the ultimate nature of Reality. This Consciousness is "Transcendent and Radiant", "the Source-Condition of everything that is", "the uncaused immortal Self", "a Conscious Light utterly beyond the limited perspective of any ego, any religion, or any culture." Everything in the physical universe, he claimed, is a modification of this Conscious Light. Expressed in more conventional language, Adi Da's realization was that there is only God, and that everything arises within that One. In later years this was summed up in the three "great sayings" of Adidam:

There is no ultimate "difference" between you and the Divine.

There is only the Divine.

Everything that exists is a "modification" of the One Divine Reality.

When Swami Muktananda stopped in California on a worldwide tour in October 1970, Adi Da visited him and related his experience the previous month of "The Bright". He felt that the swami did not understand or properly acknowledge the full importance of his realization of "Consciousness Itself", prior to visions and yogic phenomena and indeed all experiences in the context of the body-mind. During the visit Adi Da reconciled with Rudi.

In 1972, Adi Da opened Ashram Books (later Dawn Horse Books), a spiritual center and bookshop in Los Angeles. He began with a "simple and traditional" teaching method, sitting formally with a small group in the meditation hall and simply transmitting his state of "perfect Happiness" to them. He began giving discourses, soon attracting a small following due in part to his charismatic speaking style. He taught in a traditional Indian style, speaking from a raised dais surrounded by flowers and oriental carpets, with listeners seated on the floor. He incorporated many elements of the guru-devotee relationship associated with the Kashmir Shaivite and Advaita Vedanta schools of Hinduism, but also expressed original insights and opinions about both spirituality and secular culture. As the gathering grew, he introduced disciplines related to money, food, sex, and community living. He was one of the first westerners to become well known as a teacher of meditation and eastern esoteric traditions at a time when these were of growing interest. Some early participants stated that Adi Da demonstrated an ability to produce alterations in their consciousness, likening the effect to shaktipat of Indian yoga traditions. In 1972, he began to teach "radical understanding", described as "a combination of discriminative self-observation and guru-devotion". With the number of followers increasing, a formal religious community—"The Dawn Horse Communion"—was established.

In 1973, Adi Da traveled to India to meet a final time with Swami Muktananda. They disagreed on a series of questions which Adi Da had prepared, creating a rupture in their relationship. They later criticized each other's approach to spiritual matters. Adi Da nevertheless stated that he continued to appreciate and respect his former guru, and to express his "love and gratitude for the incomparable service" Muktananda had performed for him.

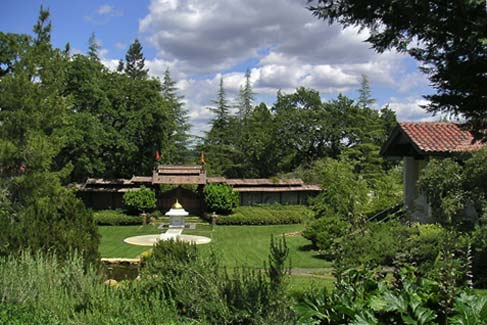
The Mountain of Attention Sanctuary in Lake County, California

Upon returning to Los Angeles, Adi Da (then Franklin Jones) assumed the name "Bubba Free John", based on a nickname meaning "friend" combined with a rendering of "Franklin Jones". He and Nina divorced, although she remained a follower. In January 1974, Adi Da told his followers that he was "the divine lord in human form". Later that year, the church obtained an aging hot springs resort in Lake County, California, renaming it "Persimmon" (it is now known as "The Mountain of Attention"). Adi Da and a group of selected followers moved there and experimented in communal living. Most followers relocated from Los Angeles to San Francisco, where Dawn Horse Books also moved.

=== "Crazy Wisdom" (1973–1983) ===
In 1973, Adi Da began to use more unconventional means of instruction, which he called "crazy wisdom", comparing it to a tradition of yogic adepts who employed seemingly un-spiritual methods to awaken disciples. Some followers reported having profound metaphysical experiences in Adi Da's presence, attributing these phenomena to his spiritual power. Others present remained skeptical, witnessing nothing supernatural.

Adi Da initiated a series of teachings and activities that came to be known as the "Garbage and the Goddess" period, based on the title of his fourth book, Garbage and the Goddess: The Last Miracles and Final Spiritual Instructions of Bubba Free John. The text recounts a four-to-five-month "teaching demonstration" by Adi Da, in which he initiated and freely participated in a cycle of activities of a "celebratory" wild and ecstatic nature – an overturning of previous restrictions and conventional behaviours that was often accompanied by spontaneous displays of "spiritual power". Many of his devotees spoke of experiencing visionary states of consciousness, kundalini phenomena, blissful states and so forth. However, Adi Da constantly reiterated that such experiences were only manifestations of the Goddess and her phenomenal world: they were not spiritually auspicious and had no bearing on the realization of Consciousness itself. The book's central message, that true spiritual life has nothing to do with extraordinary experiences (hence the "garbage" reference in the title), did not stop people from showing up, looking for both such experiences and the extravagant parties and activities portrayed in the book. This was not the message Adi Da wanted to send. Despite the book's commercial success, the community ultimately chose to withdraw it from the market.

Over a period of years, Adi Da entered into what he called "emotional-sexual reality consideration" with his formal devotees. It included "sexual theater", a form of psychodrama that sometimes involved the switching of partners, the making of pornographic movies, orgies and other intensified sexual practices, with the aim of revealing and releasing emotional and sexual neuroses. Adi Da spoke of the cultish and contractual nature of conventional relationships, particularly marriage, as being a form of reinforcement of the ego-personality and an obstacle to spiritual life. Many couples were initially encouraged to switch partners and experiment sexually. Drug and alcohol use were sometimes encouraged, and earlier proscriptions against meat and "junk food" were no longer adhered to for periods of time. Adi Da said that the emotional-sexual consideration was part of a radical overturning of conventional moral values and social contracts, obliging devotees to confront their habitual patterns and emotional attachments. According to his teaching, little of spiritual value can be accomplished until the "emotional-sexual nature of the human being" is understood, incorporated into spiritual practice, and transcended. Human sexuality, he said, always deeply encodes social practices, identity formation, and the most secret and important truths about individuals. He said that his present work in this area could not have been as effective without the earlier cultural and philosophical groundwork laid by Freud's depth psychoanalysis.

After years of consideration about sexuality with students, Adi Da summarized his instruction about sexuality and spiritual practice. Contrary to various tantric practices aimed at the transformation of sexual energy into spiritual energy, Adi Da maintains that sex, like everything to do with the body, is "not causative" relative to spirituality; at most, sex and a disciplined practice of emotional-sexual intimacy, can be made compatible with the spiritual process. The spiritual process, he emphasized, involves transcendence of identification with the body-mind altogether.

In 1979, Adi Da changed his name from "Bubba Free John" to "Da Free John" ("Da" being a Sanskrit syllable meaning "the One Who Gives"), signifying to his devotees the divine nature of his revelation as guru. He also established a second ashram in Hawaii, now called Da Love-Ananda Mahal. Over the next decade, Adi Da changed his name several times, saying it reflected differences or changes in the nature of his message and relationship to followers. Subsequent names included Da Love-Ananda, Dau Loloma, Da Kalki, Hridaya-Samartha Sat-Guru Da, Santosha Da, Da Avadhoota, Da Avabhasa, and from 1994, Adi Da Love-Ananda Samraj, or Adi Da.

=== "Divine Emergence" and final years (1983–2008) ===
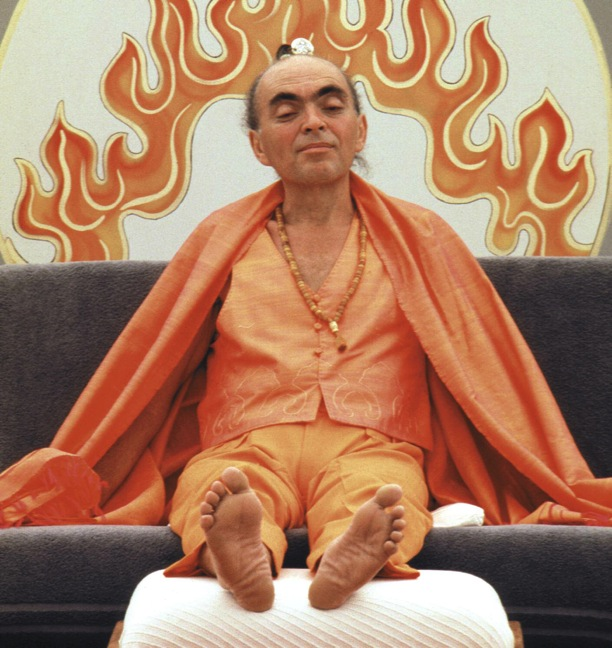
Adi Da at The Mountain of Attention Sanctuary, 1986

Even before Adi Da opened the ashram bookstore in Los Angeles in 1972, he stated that people need holy places where Spiritual Force is alive. In 1983, having established such "empowered" places in Northern California and Hawaii, Adi Da moved with a group of about 40 followers to the Fijian island of Naitauba, purchased by a wealthy follower from the actor Raymond Burr. His intention was to establish a "set-apart" hermitage for his spiritual work in the world. Adi Da Samraj became a citizen of Fiji in 1993. It was his primary residence until the end of his life.

On Naitauba Island on January 11, 1986, while expressing deep distress at what he felt was the futility of his work, Adi Da described the feeling of the life-force leaving his body, before collapsing, going into convulsions and losing consciousness. Doctors found his vital signs to be present, although his breathing was almost imperceptible. They eventually succeeded in resuscitating him. He later described the episode as a "literal death experience" with a special significance for his teaching work. His reassociation with the body was accompanied, he said, by a profound impulse of love and compassion for suffering beings. This impulse initiated a complete descent of the "Bright" into his human body, so that the divine became incarnated in human form in an unprecedented manner. The event became known in the Communion as his "Divine Emergence".

After this event, Adi Da expressed an impulse to enable people everywhere to meditate on his image or body in order to "participate in his enlightened state". He began a period of intensive fasting, before leaving Fiji for California. At The Mountain Of Attention Sanctuary he sat silently with over a thousand people, read from his book The Lion Sutra, and gave discourses calling on devotees to embrace the inherently renunciate, ego-transcending nature of the way he had given. He later traveled to New York City, London, Paris and Amsterdam, silently giving his blessing to all who came visibly into his sphere.

Following the death of spiritual teacher Frederick Lenz (Zen Master Rama) in 1998, some followers of Lenz joined Adidam. Adi Da actively supported Lenz's followers joining his organization; according to religious studies professor Eugene V. Gallagher, Adi Da claimed to have been Swami Vivekananda in a past life, with Lenz having been Vivekenanda's disciple Rama Tirtha.

In the late 1990s Adi Da often spoke of dark forces that were becoming increasingly powerful in the world, telling devotees of his constant engagement with these forces and his unarmoured receptivity to the pain and misery of the countless people suffering. These processes, he said, had a devastating effect on his body, and in April 2000, while traveling in Northern California under the care of devotees, he became almost completely physically incapacitated. On April 12, at Lopez Island, in the presence of a number of devotees, he again experienced a process of disassociation from the physical resembling death. In this event, he said, he became fully established as the "Bright" Itself, in a living demonstration of what he calls "Divine Translation". Only the knowledge that his work in human form had not yet been completed, he said, maintained his connection to the world and drew him back into embodiment. Adidam later acquired the property on Lopez Island where this had taken place, renaming it "Ruchira Dham Hermitage": the event itself, which Adi Da discusses in detail in part 19 of The Aletheon, is referred to as "The Ruchira Dham Event". He wrote that it marked the definitive end of his "active" teaching work: from now on he would simply transmit his state, requiring devotees to become responsible for their reception of that. He nonetheless continued to write books, make art, and give discourses, but with an increased emphasis on what he called "silent Darshan".

In the last years of his life, Adi Da began to exhibit his digital art and photography. Followers reported that he died of cardiac arrest on November 27, 2008, at his home in Fiji, while working on his art.

Adi Da had four children: three biological daughters with three different women, and one adopted daughter.

== Teachings ==
Adi Da's philosophical teachings can be summarized as:

- The true nature of Reality is indivisible Conscious Light.
- The sense of separate self is an illusion, caused by our own activity of "self-contraction".
- Transcending the illusion of an apparently separate self reveals our true identity as Conscious Light, or Reality Itself.

Adi Da maintained that human beings are always demanding an explanation for the existence of the world or the bodily "self". There is a presumption that the world or the self is first. People, therefore, seek to account for these first, and then seek to understand the Divine on that basis. To the dualistic "point of view", these presumptions are the fundamentally necessary starting point to all philosophical or metaphysical considerations.

Conversely, Adi Da affirmed that the proper beginning of philosophy (or what he called the fundamental principle of "Perfect Philosophy") is the intrinsic apprehension of the egoless, indivisible, non-separate, and acausal nature of Reality or Conscious Light. When this prior Reality is understood, he said, the need to account for the world, the body, or the self disappears: they are recognized as dualistic presumptions, not primary realities from which Truth can then be found.

=== "Self-contraction" ===
According to Adi Da's teaching, the human being's apparent inability to live as Conscious Light is a result of the illusion of a separate self. The ego—the "I" with whom each individual identifies—is not an entity, or even an idea or a concept; it is a "chronic and total psycho-physical Activity of self-contraction", locatable in feeling as a subtle but constant anxiety or stress, and recognizable in all manifestations of reactive emotion. It is a mistaken identification with the limitations of the body-mind mechanism, necessarily implying differentiation of 'self' from 'other' beings or 'selves'. Self-contraction is an unnecessary and unnatural limit placed on Energy, or the Inherent Radiance of Transcendental Being, which is always already perfectly free. The act creates a consciousness apparently cut off from its primordial unity, producing the self-obsession and incessant seeking symbolised in the myth of Narcissus. An individual biography is generated from the movement of "desire" – the constant effort to "create a connection, a flow of force, between the contracted identity and everything from which it has differentiated itself." Efforts to reunite with the divine from the position of the separate self are necessarily futile because this self itself is a fundamental illusion. The already present divine, according to Adi Da, can only be realized through releasing the contraction and transcending the illusion of the separate self altogether. Such transcendence, he maintained, is made possible through satsang – the devotional relationship to the Spiritual Master or Satguru who transmits and communicates the Truth.

=== "Seventh stage realization" ===
Adi Da developed a schema called "the seven stages of life," which he says is a precise "mapping" of the potential developmental course of human spiritual experience as it unfolds through the gross, subtle, and causal dimensions of the being. "Gross" means made of material elements and refers to the physical body. The subtle dimension, which is senior to and which pervades the gross dimension, consists of the etheric (or personal life-energy), and includes the lower mental functions (conscious mind, subconscious mind, and unconscious mind) and higher mental functions (discriminative mind and will). The causal dimension is senior to both the subtle and the gross dimensions. It is the root of attention, or the essence of identity with the separate self or ego-"I".

- First Stage—"individuation/physical development"
- Second Stage—"socialization"
- Third Stage—"integration/mental development"
- Fourth Stage—"spiritualization/Divine Communion"
- Fifth Stage—"spiritual ascent"
- Sixth Stage—"abiding in consciousness"
- Seventh Stage—"Divine Enlightenment: awakening from all egoic limitations"

Adi Da categorized the fourth, fifth, and sixth stages of life as the highest respective stages of human development. He characterized those who have reached these stages as "saints", "yogis", and "sages", including other religious figures such as Gautama Buddha and Jesus Christ.

In Adi Da's schema, the sixth stage or horizontal process is "the exclusion of all awareness of the 'outside' world (in both its gross and subtle dimensions), by 'secluding' oneself within the heart—in order to rest in the Divine Self", or Consciousness Itself. As this is "achieved by conditional means—the conditional effort of exclusion", it is non-permanent. Relative to this spectrum, Adi Da stated that while some "yogis, saints, and sages" had occasionally indicated some awareness of a "seventh stage", only he as a unique avatar had ever been born fully invested with the capability to embody it fully; furthermore, as the first "Seventh Stage Adept" only he would ever need to (or be capable of) doing so. He stated that the seventh stage has nothing to do with development and does not come after the sixth stage sequentially. Seventh stage Realization is a permanent, natural state of "open-eyed ecstasy", for which Adi Da employed the Sanskrit term Sahaj Samadhi or Seventh Stage Sahaja Nirvikalpa Samadhi. Adi Da claimed to be in the seventh stage of life, most perfectly realized as Conscious Light Itself, which is absolutely unconditional and is therefore permanent.

Adi Da stated that since he solely embodied seventh-stage realization, the practice of devotional recognition-response to him, in conjunction with fundamental self-understanding, would henceforth be the exclusive means for others to most perfectly transcend "self-contraction", thereby allowing them to "participate in his enlightened state" (i.e., awaken to the seventh stage Realization).

== Adidam ==
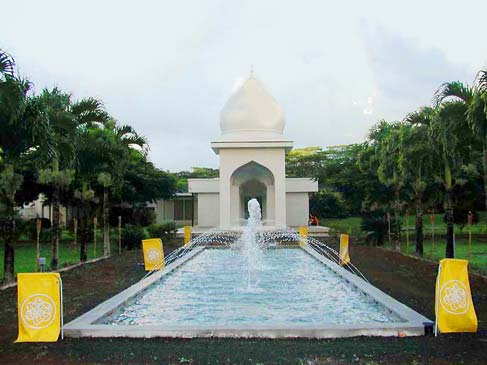
Dome Temple at Da Love-Ananda Mahal in Kauaʻi, Hawaii

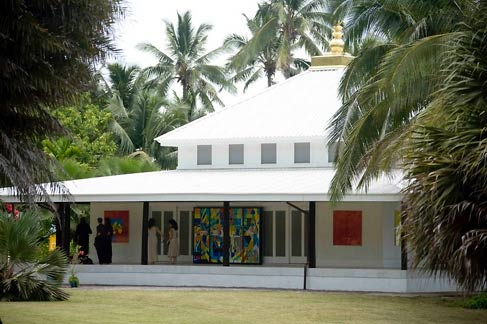
Temple at Adi Da Samrajashram in Naitauba, Fiji

Adidam refers to both the organization of Adi Da's devotees and the religion he taught. The organization, or church, founded initially in 1972, went by many earlier names, including the Dawn Horse Communion, the Free Communion Church, the Laughing Man Institute, the Crazy Wisdom Fellowship, the Way of Divine Ignorance, and the Johannine Daist Communion. Adi Da's devotees recognize him to be a spiritual master who is the avataric incarnation of the "Bright", or Conscious Light itself.

Many aspects of Adidam presuppose an Indian view of divinity, accepting concepts such as karma, reincarnation, chakras, etc. It employs many Sanskrit terms and concepts. God, or the divine, is seen as a principle and energy, a consciousness that predates creation but is not a willful creator itself.

Adidam was also suggested to have increasingly resembled the Hindu tradition of bhakti yoga. The Oxford Handbook of New Religious Movements noted that "[w]hile acknowledging his debts to both Advaita Vedanta and Buddhism, Adi Da asserted the originality of his own religious teaching". The practice of Adidam is defined by its emphasis on a devotional relationship to Adi Da, whom followers see as an enlightened source of transcendental spiritual transmission capable of awakening others to seventh stage divine realization. Adi Da's followers often refer to him simply as "Beloved". While devotion to Adi Da and the study of his teachings are the primary features of Adidam, other specified practices are also prescribed, including the study of other religious texts, physical exercises, regulation of sexuality, and a raw vegan diet. In his book The Aletheon, Adi Da described the mysterious appearance of the Avatar from his childhood in this way: "Something in the super-physics of the universe makes it possible for the divine conscious light to avatarically incarnate as an apparent human individual, for the purpose of bringing others into the sphere of divinely enlightened existence".

Adi Da said that after his death, there would be no further teachings or "revelations," and that his message was complete. His artwork, writings, and the religious hermitages and sanctuaries "empowered" by his presence are to remain as expressions of his teaching and being. He was emphatic that no individual assert themselves as his representative or heir.

While the primary spiritual center of the church is Naitauba Island, Fiji, there are two officially designated ashrams, or "sanctuaries", belonging to Adidam in the United States, with another in Europe, and another in New Zealand. Followers of Adidam have been ambitious and prolific in disseminating Adi Da's books and teachings; however, the church is estimated to have remained approximately 1,000 members worldwide since 1974, with a high rate of turnover among the membership.

== Works ==
Adi Da produced a variety of literary and creative works, primarily the large number of books that he wrote. The Oxford Handbook of New Religious Movements wrote that "[o]n his passing Adi Da Samraj's personal charisma was collapsed into the charisma of the sacred books, and the art and the theatrical works he left behind".

=== Books ===
Cover of the 2007 edition of The Knee Of Listening

Adi Da authored more than 75 books, including those published posthumously, with key works including his autobiography, The Knee Of Listening, spiritual works such as The Aletheon and The Dawn Horse Testament, and literature such as The Orpheum. He wrote prolifically about his spiritual philosophy, creating the Dawn Horse Press in 1973 to publish his books. It continues to print many Adi Da-authored titles. Best known among these is The Knee Of Listening. First published in 1972, it has been reissued in a number of editions, undergoing extensive revisions and additions. The first edition was 271 pages long; the latest is 840. The Oxford Handbook of New Religious Movements quoted a follower of Adi Da as saying:

The words of Adi Da Samraj, as his devotees can confess, carry a potency that is vastly beyond the verbal meaning, a force that activates fundamental transformations in the being. He invests himself spiritually in all of his writing, and that transmission can be received through reading any of his books.

The Aletheon, in particular, was described as "[o]ne of his most important works… on which he put the finishing touches the day he passed".

=== Art ===
Adi Da graduated from Stanford University in 1963. His master's thesis, "a study of core issues in modernism, focused on Gertrude Stein and the leading painters of the same period", demonstrated his interest in art. In the last decade of his life, Adi Da focused on creating works of art intended to enable viewers to enter into a "space" beyond limited "points of view". These works were primarily photographic and digitally produced large works of pigmented inks on paper or canvas, and monumentally sized works of paint on aluminum. He labeled his art "Transcendental Realism". He was invited to the 2007 Venice Biennale to participate through an official collateral exhibition, and was later invited to exhibit his work in Florence, Italy, in the 15th century Cenacolo di Ognissanti and the Bargello Museum. His work has also been shown in New York, Los Angeles, Amsterdam, Miami, and London.

== Reception ==
=== Critique ===
==== Ken Wilber ====
From 1980 to 1990, philosophical theorist and author Ken Wilber wrote a number of enthusiastic endorsements and forewords for Adi Da's books, including The Dawn Horse Testament, The Divine Emergence of the World-Teacher, and Scientific Proof of the Existence of God Will Soon Be Announced by the White House! Wilber also recommended Adi Da as a spiritual teacher to those interested in his own writings.

Later, Wilber alternated between praise and pointed criticism. In his last public statement concerning Adi Da he wrote: "I affirm all of the extremes of my statements about Da: he is one of the greatest spiritual Realizers of all time, in my opinion, and yet other aspects of his personality lag far behind those extraordinary heights. By all means, look to him for utterly profound revelations, unequaled in many ways; yet step into his community at your own risk".

==== Others ====
In 1982, yoga and religion scholar Georg Feuerstein formally became a follower of Adi Da and wrote a number of introductions to Adi Da books. He later renounced this affiliation, becoming publicly critical of Adi Da and the community surrounding him in Fiji. Feuerstein devoted a chapter to Adi Da in his 1991 book Holy Madness: Spirituality, Crazy-Wise Teachers, and Enlightenment. In the introduction to the 2006 edition, Feuerstein describes having edited the sections devoted to Adi Da to reflect these changes in opinion.

Asian-Religions scholar Scott Lowe was an early follower of Adi Da and lived in the community in 1974. In an essay later analyzing what he had witnessed as well as Adi Da's subsequent career, he perceives a pattern of "abusive, manipulative, and self-centered" behavior, saying "does it necessarily follow that the individual who is 'liberated' is free to indulge in what appear to be egocentric, hurtful, and damaging actions in the name of spiritual freedom? I personally think not, while acknowledging the subtlety and complexity of the ongoing debate".

Lowe and others have also criticized Adi Da's claims toward the exclusivity of his realization. In part, critics point to his earlier message, strongly rejecting the necessity for any religious authority or belief, due to "enlightenment" being every individual's natural condition.

Adi Da heavily edited subsequent editions of his books, for which they have been criticized as auto-hagiography and self-mythology.

University of Southern California religion professor Robert Ellwood wrote, "Accounts of life with [Adi Da] in his close-knit spiritual community [describe] extremes of asceticism and indulgence, of authoritarianism and antinomianism… Supporters of the alleged avatar rationalize such eccentricities as shock therapy for the sake of enlightenment".

==== Controversies ====
In 1985, accusations of misbehavior by Adi Da and some of his followers attracted media attention. Adi Da and Adidam (then known as Da Free John and The Johannine Daist Communion) were subjects of almost daily coverage in April of that year in the San Francisco Chronicle, San Francisco Examiner, Mill Valley Record, and other regional media resources. The story gained national attention with a two-part exposé on The Today Show that aired May 9 and 10.

In investigative reports and interviews, some ex-members made numerous specific allegations of Adi Da forcing members to engage in psychologically, sexually, and physically abusive and humiliating behavior, as well as accusing the church of committing tax fraud. Others stated that they never witnessed or were involved in any such activities. None of these accusations were substantiated in a court of law.

The church issued conflicting statements in response to the coverage. A lawyer for the church said that controversial sexual activities had only occurred during the "Garbage and Goddess" period years earlier. Shortly after, an official church spokesman said that "tantra-style encounters" of the kind described in allegations were still occurring, but were mostly confined to an inner circle. This confirmed the stories by former members that such activities had continued up to the time of the lawsuits and interviews in 1985. The church said that no illegal acts had taken place and that the movement had a right to continue experiments in lifestyles.

Two lawsuits were filed against Adi Da and his organization in 1985. The first was brought by Beverly O'Mahoney, then wife of the Adidam president, alleging fraud and assault (among other things); the suit sought $5 million in damages. Adidam threatened to file its own lawsuit against O'Mahoney, as well as five others who had been named in stories and interviews making allegations of abuse (no suit was ever filed). Adidam charged that allegations against the church were part of an extortion plot. The O'Mahoney suit was dismissed by the court the next year. The other lawsuit and two threatened suits in the mid-1980s were settled with payments and confidentiality agreements, negatively impacting member morale. Since the mid-1980s, no lawsuits have been filed against Adi Da or any Adidam organizations.

Jeffrey J. Kripal assessed the charges against Adi Da in the broader context of sexually active gurus, teachers, and Eastern tantric traditions altogether. He noted that many sects experienced scandals due to sexual escapades collapsing "false fronts of celibacy", which contrasted with Adidam's open period of sexual experimentation. Kripal further wrote:

In this historical American-Asian context, it is hardly surprising that serious ethical charges involving sexual abuse and authoritarian manipulation have been leveled at Adi Da and his community for very similar, if far more open and acknowledged, antinomian practices and ideas. Bay Area journalistic reports from a single month in 1985 are especially salacious, and any full treatment of the erotic within Adidam would need to spend dozens of careful pages analyzing both the accuracy of the reports and the community's interpretation and understanding of the same events, the latter framed largely in the logic of "crazy wisdom", that is, the notion that the enlightened master can employ antinomian shock tactics that appear to be immoral or abusive in order to push his disciples into new forms of awareness and freedom. Perhaps what is most remarkable about the case of Adidam is the simple fact that the community has never denied the most basic substance of the charges, that is, that sexual experimentation was indeed used in the ashrams and that some people experienced these as abusive, particularly in the Garbage and the Goddess Period, even if it has also differed consistently and strongly on their proper interpretation and meaning.

=== Endorsements ===
In a foreword to the 2004 edition of Adi Da's autobiography The Knee Of Listening, religious scholar Jeffrey J. Kripal described Adi Da's total corpus as being "the most doctrinally thorough, the most philosophically sophisticated, the most culturally challenging, and the most creatively original literature currently available in the English language".

Physician and homeopath Gabriel Cousens wrote an endorsement for Adi Da's biography The Promised God-Man Is Here, saying, "it has deepened my experience of Him as the Divine Gift established in the cosmic domain". He also mentions Adi Da in his books Spiritual Nutrition and Tachyon Energy. Psychiatrist Elisabeth Kübler-Ross wrote an endorsement for Adi Da's book Easy Death, referring to it as a "masterpiece".

Philosopher Henry Leroy Finch Jr. wrote that "[i]f there is a man today who is God-illumined, that man is Avatar Adi Da Samraj. There exists nowhere in the world, among Christians, Jews, Muslims, Hindus, Buddhists, or any other groups, anyone who has so much to teach. Avatar Adi Da is a force to be reckoned with, a Pole around which the world can get its bearings".

== See also ==
- Advaita Vedanta
- Avatar
- New religious movement
