= Russian Baroque =

Russian artistic style in late 17th and early 18th centuries

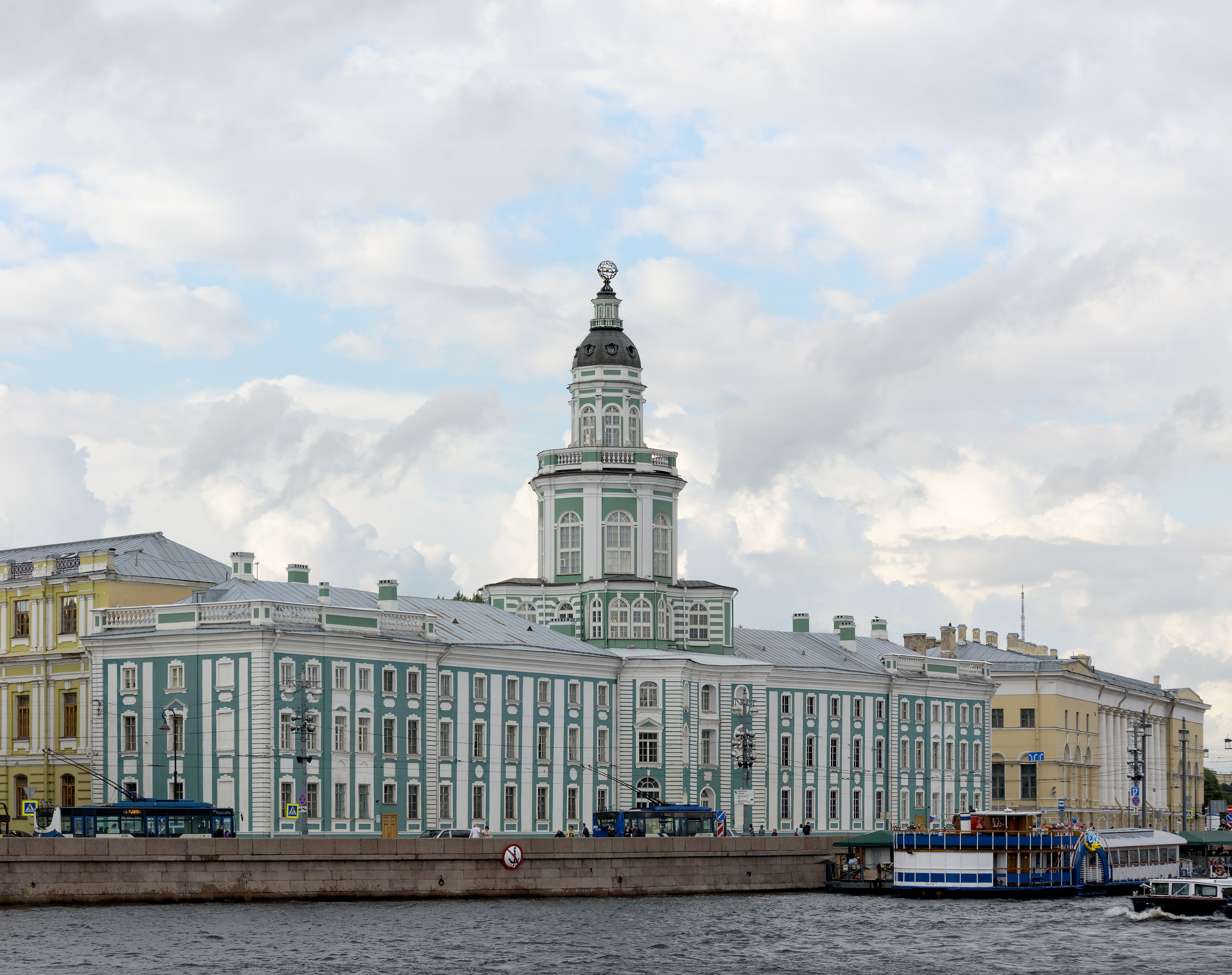
The building of the Kunstkamera in Saint Petersburg. 1719–1758

Russian Baroque is a term used to describe the Baroque artistic style that emerged in the Russian Tsardom and the Russian Empire during the late 17th and early 18th centuries. This style was mainly seen in Saint Petersburg and Moscow during the reigns of Peter the Great and Elizabeth of Russia.

== General definitions ==
Baroque architecture is characterised by the opening of volumes into surrounding space, dynamism, expression of forms, exaggeration of scales, majestic ensembles, and huge building sizes. It features powerful proportions, contrasts of closed and open spaces, twisted columns, and dramatic effects, including light coming from the dome above. Baroque architecture also includes illusions of statues coming to life, an abundance of colour and gilding, and quadratura of paintings with trompe-l'œil effects. In Russia, Baroque art had a number of special features.

In Russia, the Renaissance did not fully develop in the same way as it did in Western Europe, particularly in Italy, due to specific socio-economic conditions. As a result, the personalisation of creativity necessary for the development of art as a history of artistic styles was not achieved until the 18th century. For comparison, during the Renaissance in Italy, the works of Leonardo da Vinci, Raphael, and Michelangelo became major artistic trends that later influenced the development of all Western European classical art. In contrast, during the era of the 'Russian Renaissance' in Russia, the outstanding works of Andrei Rublev and Dionisius had more of a general spiritual significance. The change in world outlook that occurred in Europe during the Italian Renaissance was slower to take hold in Russia, happening throughout the 17th century. As a result, the enlightenment functions of the Renaissance were reflected in the art of the so-called 'Russian Baroque' of the 17th century. Its main significance lies not in being an integral artistic style, but rather as a humanistic, enlightenment ideological movement that introduced Russian culture to the achievements of Western European civilization.

The second crucial difference between the development of Russian art and Western European art is that Russia's distance from the classical art centres of Athens, Rome, Florence, and Paris caused a delay and subsequent 'splicing' of historical artistic styles. These styles were consistently born and developed in the metropolises one after another. The chronology and typology of artistic styles in Russia during the 18th and 19th centuries differ significantly from those in Western Europe.

Natalia Kovalenskaya was the first historian of Russian art of the 18th century to identify the unique 'splicing' of artistic styles in Russia. She wrote that after Peter the Great's reforms in the early 18th century, "many stages, consistently undergone by other European nations, in Russia often appeared as if spliced, compacted...there were sometimes unexpected combinations of very dissimilar phenomena".

In the 1940s Boris Viipper further specified this thesis in his articles: "It is more correct, apparently, to imagine the picture of the development of the artistic outlook in Russia in the sense that, catching up with Europe at an ever more accelerating pace, Russian art simultaneously solved the problems of previous stages of development, and sometimes, on the contrary, unexpectedly leaped ahead of Europe and went out of the framework of a seemingly natural development, thus combining advanced features with backward elements, with traditions deeply conservative during the course of one evolution stage".

Something similar happened in England, where the historical and territorial separation from continental Europe, combined with the unique English psychology, gave rise to a distinctive 'English style'. This style has remained largely unchanged over the centuries and unites local variants that are slightly different from each other, but very different from European, such as English classicism, baroque, and rococo. In Western Europe, the Baroque style, particularly in architecture, was developed by reinterpreting the established classicist forms of architecture and painting that had already been established in Italy at the start of the 16th century. In Russia, a different sequence of artistic styles took place: first, a particular 'Russian Baroque' developed in the late 17th and first half of the 18th century, followed by Classicism in the second half of the 18th and early 19th centuries. In Western Europe, the second half of the 18th century is known as neoclassicism, which was the second or third wave of the classicist movement. Russia, on the other hand, was experiencing this stage for the first time. Therefore, many researchers believe that as much as Western European influences on Russian culture strengthened in the 17th century, they should not be considered the cause of a new style. The increase in influence was more likely a consequence of the peculiarities of pre-Renaissance national development.

During the first half of the 18th century, Baroque art flourished in Russia, reflecting the growth and consolidation of the absolute monarchy. The Russian mature Baroque, especially in architecture, was distinguished from Western European Baroque by its structural clarity and simplicity of planning solutions, as well as the close connection between the structural basis and decorative elements. Another notable characteristic of Russian Baroque is its prominent use of colour, bold colour contrasts, and chiaroscuro, including gilding.

== Main stages of Baroque style formation in Russia ==
- Moscow Baroque (from 1680s to 1700s), also known as Naryshkin Baroque, is a transitional period from Russian patterned (Russian узорчье) to full-fledged Baroque. It preserves many structural and decorative elements of architecture of Kievan Rus', reworked under the influence of the Baroque in the Polish-Lithuanian Commonwealth. This style is characterized by an abundance of chopped decoration, vertical orientation, and tiered composition, such as the octagon on the quadrangle and tetraconch.
- The Stroganov Baroque is a conventional form of Moscow Baroque. Four churches were built in this style: the Stroganov and Smolensk churches in Nizhny Novgorod, the Presentation Cathedral in Solvychegodsk, and the Church of Our Lady of Kazan in Ustyuzhna.
- Golitsyn Baroque is considered the most radical direction within the Moscow Baroque movement. It was heavily influenced by Italian Baroque through travelling artels, particularly Ticin masters.
- Petrine Baroque (from 1700s to 1720s) refers to the individual styles of creativity employed by Western European architects who were invited by Peter the Great to build the new capital, Saint Petersburg, along with their Russian pupils.
- The Elizabethan Baroque style (from 1730s to 1760s) is a peculiar baroque-rocaille style that was most notably exemplified in the grandiose buildings of Francesco Bartolomeo Rastrelli in Saint Petersburg and its suburban palaces.

== Gallery ==
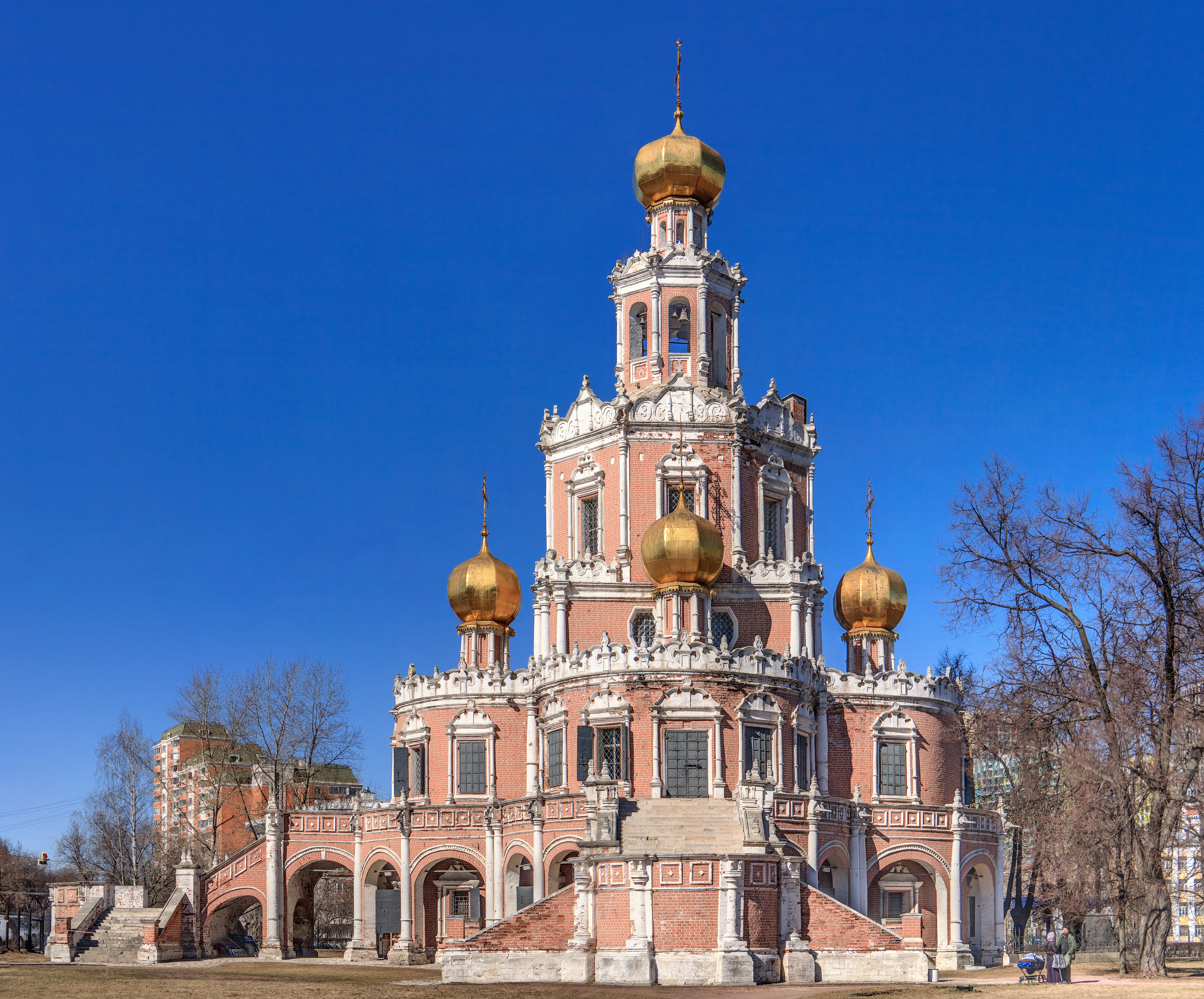
Naryshkin Baroque. Church of the Intercession at Fili near Moscow. 1690–1694

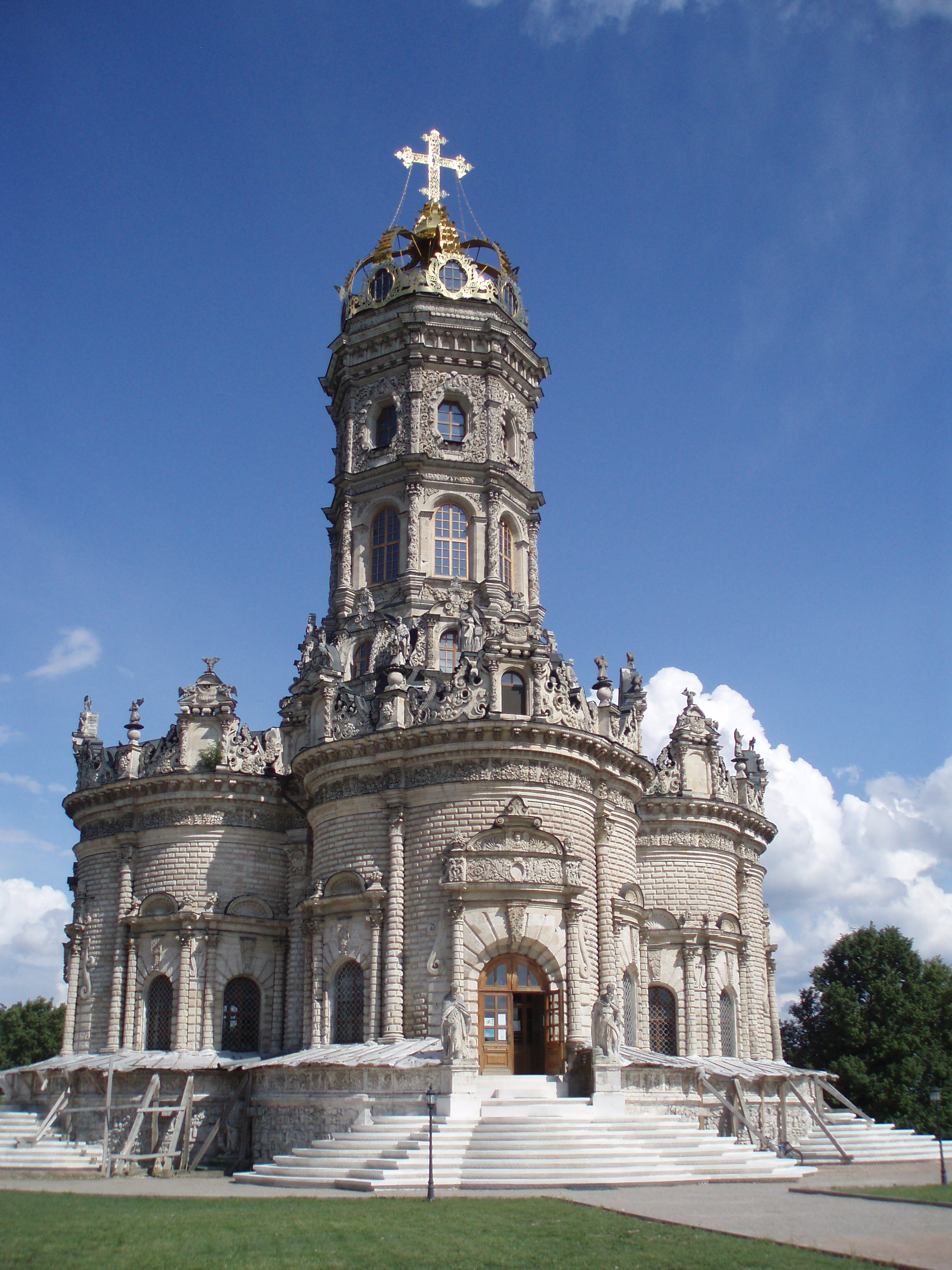
Golitsyn Baroque. Znamenskaya Church (Dubrovitsy). Moscow Region. 1690–1704

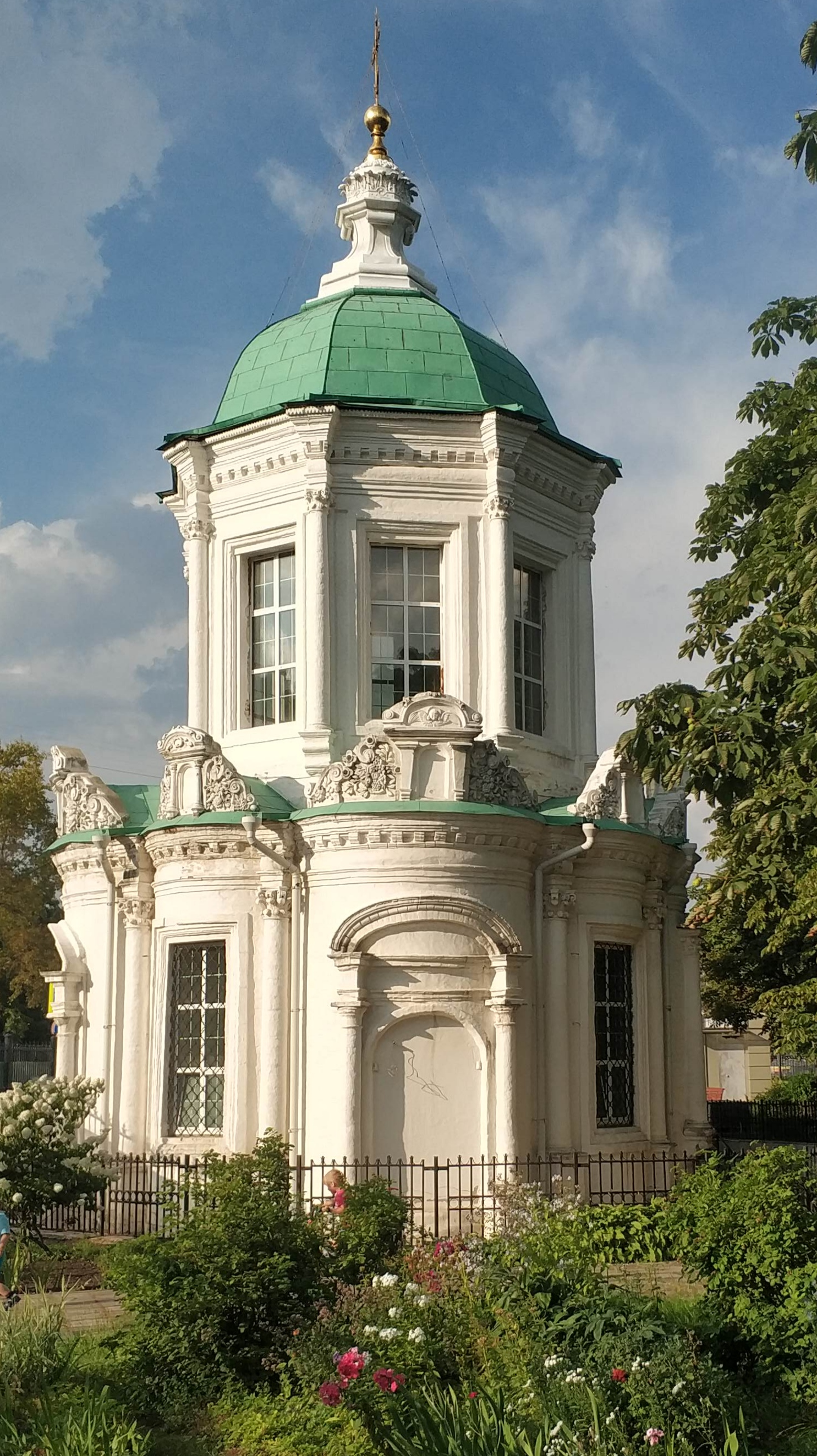
Golitsyn Baroque. Znamenskaya church in Perovo district 1690–1705

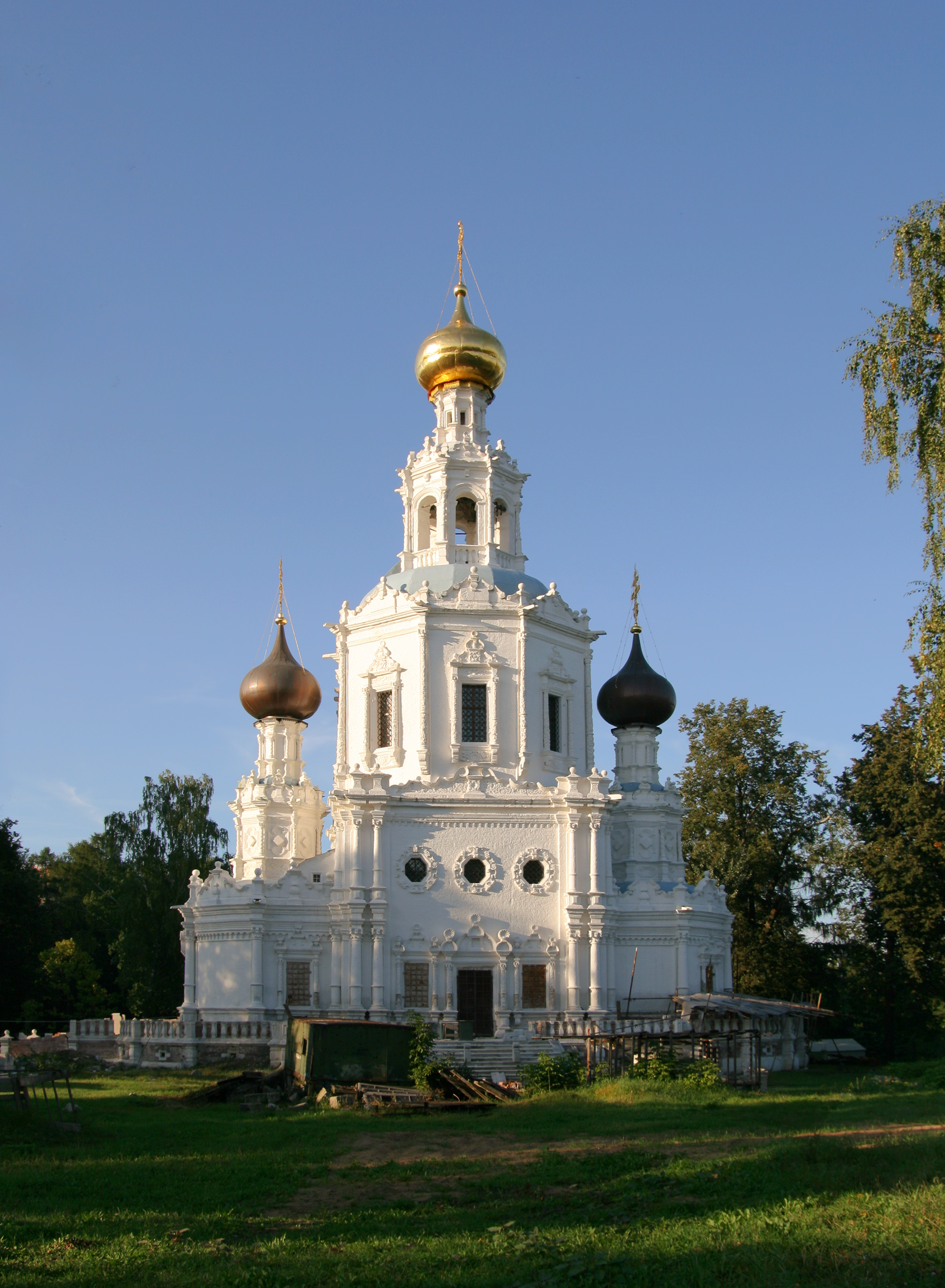
Naryshkin Baroque. The Church of the Life-Giving Trinity in Troitse-Lykovo 1698–1703.

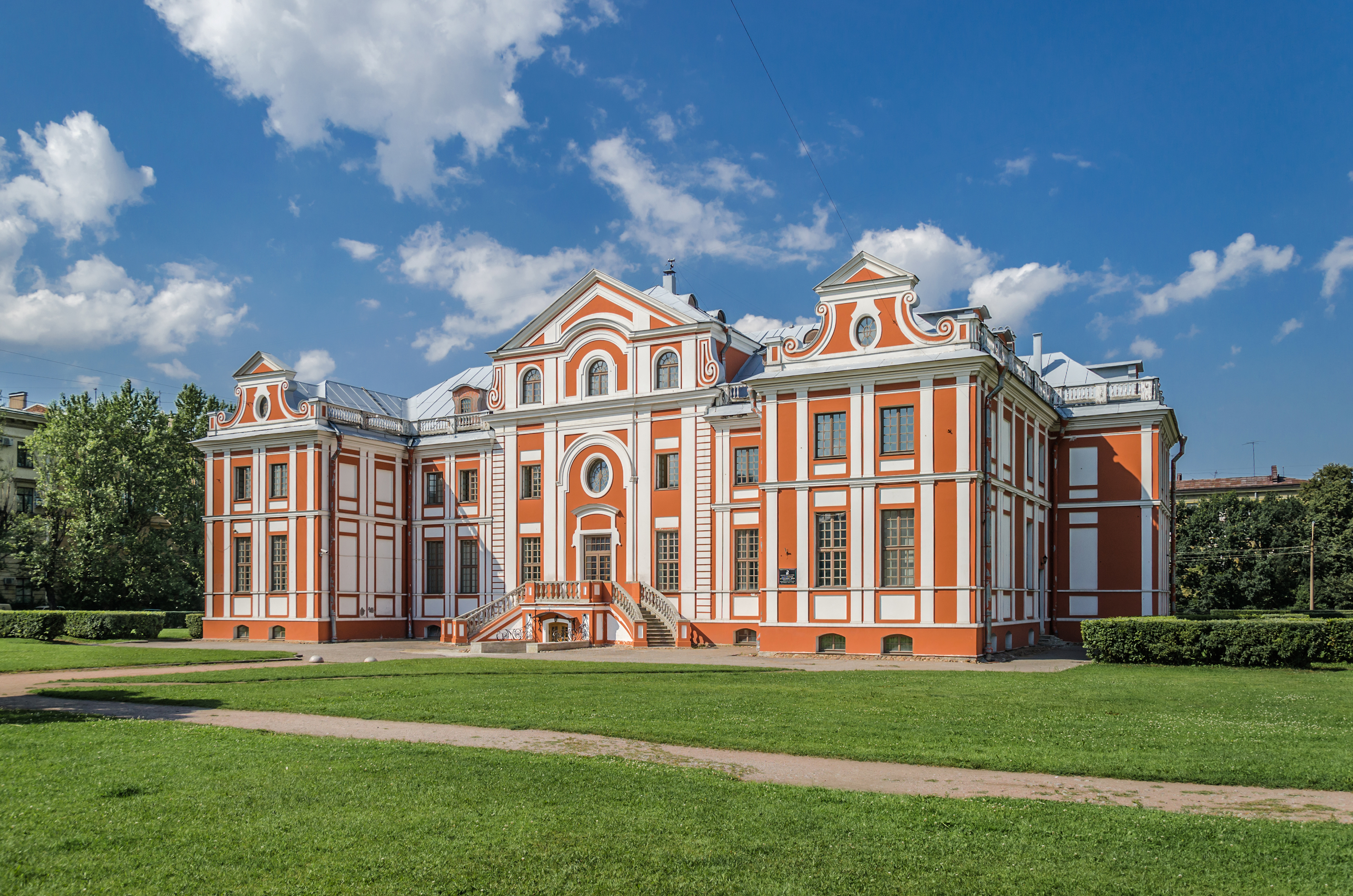
Petrine Baroque. Kikin Hall. St Petersburg. 1714–1718

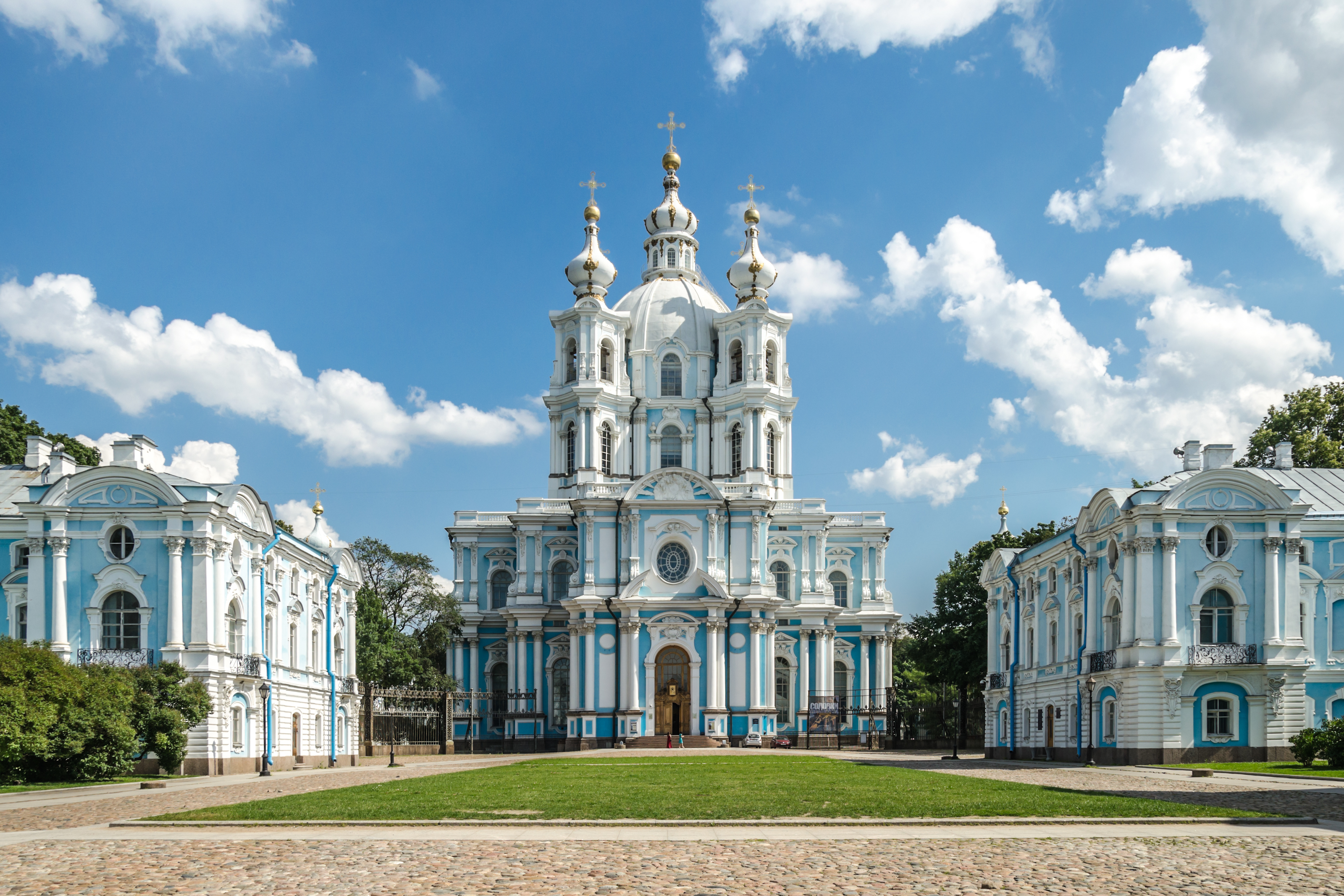
Elizabethan Baroque. Smolny Cathedral. St Petersburg. 1748–1764. Architect Francesco Bartolomeo Rastrelli

== Regional variations ==
The Baroque style in the northern and eastern regions of Russia is characterised by simplified forms and a tendency towards pictorial piling up of successively smaller volumes. According to Anri Kaptikov, there are provincial Baroque schools in Totma, Veliky Ustyug, the Vyatka region, the Ural region (specifically the 'Pokhodashin' churches), and Siberia. The Siberian Baroque is known for its originality, combining the Moscow Baroque style with elements borrowed from the Ukrainian Baroque and decorative additions from the East.

In the western region of the Russian Federation, there are preserved monuments of both Polish Baroque and Cossack Baroque, typical of Slobozhanshchyna. The former is exemplified by the church in Sebezh built in 1625 and the Church of the Saviour in Trubchevsk built in 1640. The latter is characterized by the Cossack cathedral in Starodub built in 1678, the Trinity cathedral in Belgorod, and the three-domed cathedral in Sevsk. Unfortunately, many of these monuments are currently in a deplorable condition.
