= Bochka =

Bochka may be

- an obsolete Russian unit of measurement, literally "barrel"
- Bochka roof
- Aliaksandar Bochka (1926–2015), Apostolic Visitor for Belarusian Greek-Catholic faithful abroad and a notable Belarusian émigré social and religious leader who lived in London after leaving Belarus in 1944
- a subgenre of industrial techno
