= Karp Zolotaryov =

Russian painter

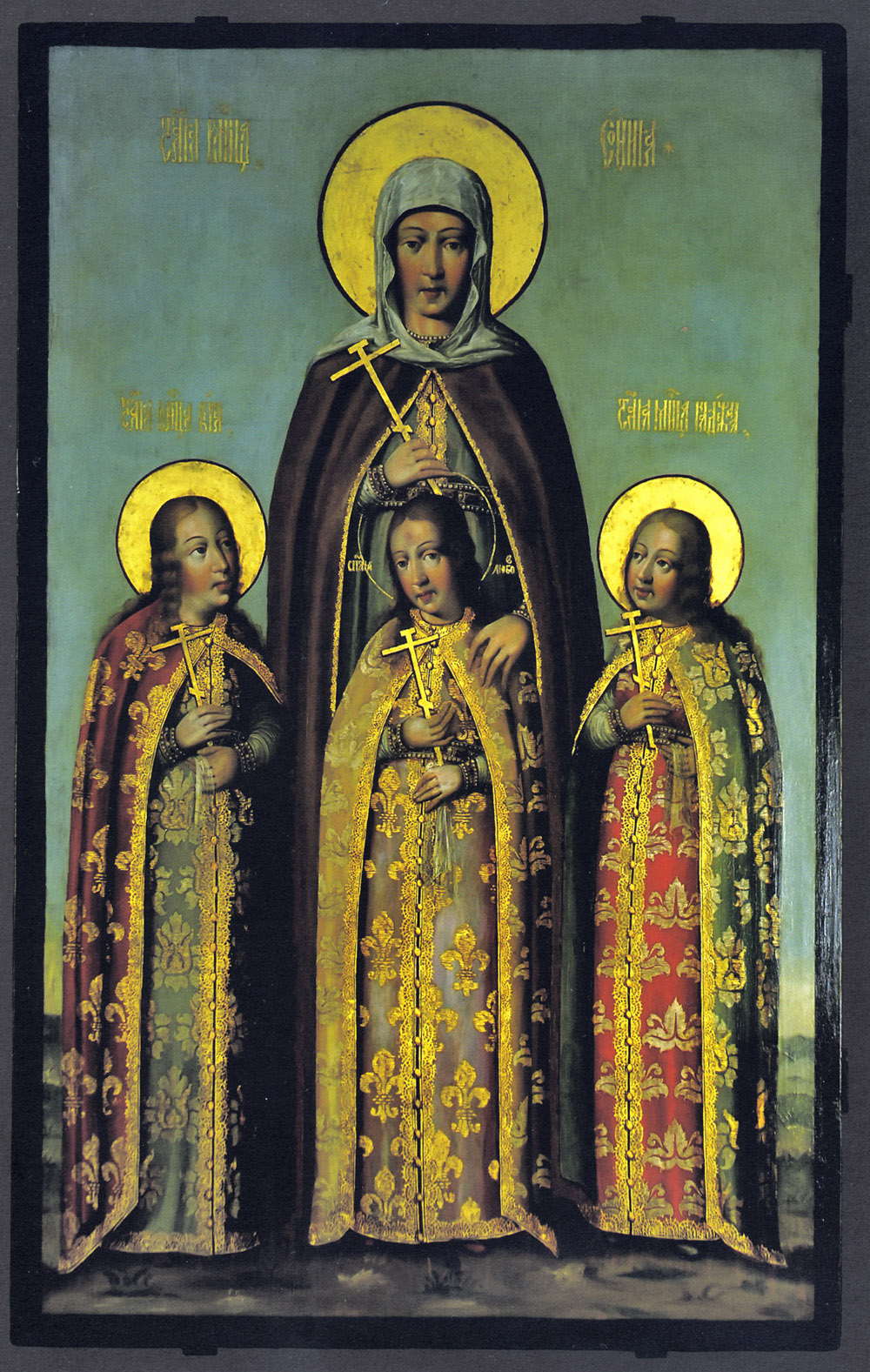
- Holy martyrs Faith, Hope and Charity and their mother Sophia. Novodevichy Convent, 1685
- Born: Russia
- Known for: Icons, carved iconostasis, interior design

Karp Ivanovich Zolotaryov (Russian: Карп Иванович Золотарёв, fl. last quarter of the 17th century) was a Muscovite painter, interior designer and wood carver, employed by Posolsky prikaz and the Kremlin Armoury. Zolotaryov was the author of iconostasis of the Transfiguration church in Novodevichy Convent and the Church of the Intercession at Fili and the icons of Donskoy Monastery. Surviving paintings by Zolotaryov, created in the period directly preceding the reforms of Peter I, form a bridge between traditional Orthodox icon painting and the modern realistic painting introduced in Russia in the 18th century.

== Biography ==
The identity of Karp Zolotaryov was discovered in archives by Ivan Snegiryov and first published in print in 1857. For the next hundred years Zolotaryov was known only through archival evidence: historians knew the sites where he worked and the themes of his icons but could not positively attribute the unsigned icons to the artist. In 1955 Elena Ovchinnikova was the first to attribute an apparently unsigned icon of the Fili church to Zolotaryov. In 1960s this was confirmed by a newly found autograph of Zolotaryov on the iconostasis of the Fili church; more autographs were discovered during restoration of its icons in 1973.

The year of birth and family origins of Zolotaryov are unknown. Official records declared him "a natural born and eternal slave" (Russian: прирождённый и вечный холоп) of the Tsar. In 1667–1672 Zolotaryov was an apprentice to Bogdan Saltanov, an Armenian-born lead painter of the Kremlin Armoury. By 1680 Zolotaryov, still employed by the Armoury, trained his own class of at least five identified apprentices. His 15-year tenure at the Armoury was dedicated primarily to the interiors of the Kremlin and country residences of the Romanovs. Work assignments included designing and carving furniture, painting palace frescoes and church art, realistic parsuna portraits and even a handmade calendar of the celestial movement (1679) for teaching Peter I who was then seven years old. All this artwork was eventually lost with the exception of two carved khorugv stakes.

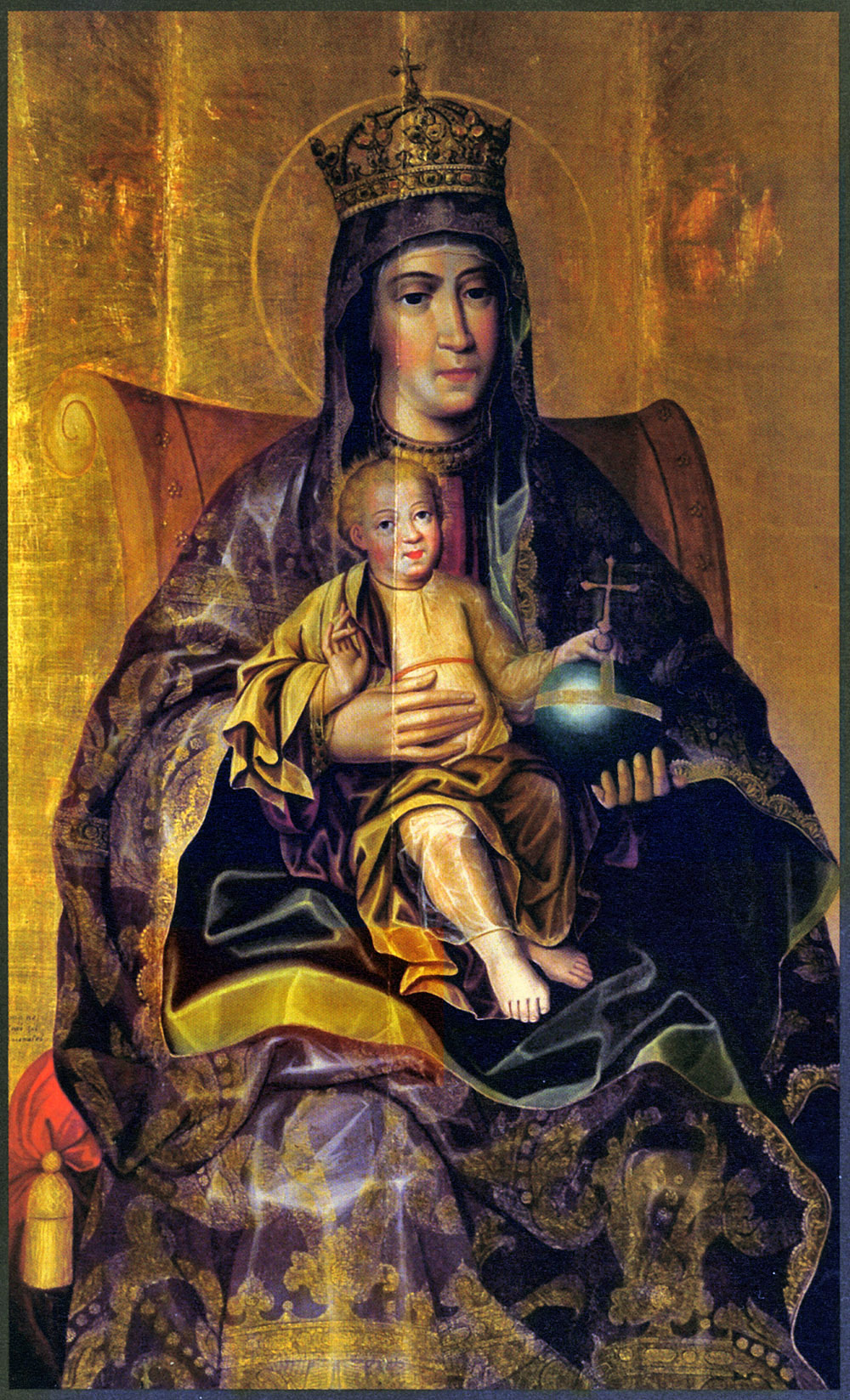
Theotokos and The Child. Andrey Rublyov museum.

In March 1681 Feodor III of Russia sent Zolotaryov to Ukraine to study Ukrainian church architecture. The assignment coincided with Feodor's plans to build a new palace and spiritual center on the Presnya River. In May 1681, immediately upon Zolotaryov's return, Feodor authorized construction of a new church of "previously unknown layout", presumably modeled upon Saint Nicholas cathedral in Nizhyn; the project was abandoned when Feodor died in 1682. In the same year Zolotaryov was transferred to the gold-painting workshop of Posolsky prikaz (equivalent of modern ministries of foreign affairs) and awarded an unusually high salary of 138 roubles annually. The workshop, an extension of the Armory, traditionally produced illuminated manuscripts, however, Zolotaryov was not involved in this function; the only book credited to him was the Book on building mills (1691). Instead, Zolotaryov led interior decoration "department" within the workshop; he designed and personally carved the beds of Ivan V, his sisters Feodosia, Natalia and Ekaterina, and for Vasily Golitsyn. The least expensive of these beds cost more than his annual pay. In 1686 Vasily Golitsyn paid Zolotaryov 126 roubles for painting, presumably, icons and murals of Golitsyn's country church.

In the 1680s Zolotaryov was regularly commissioned to design, carve and erect templa; his work in the Dormition Cathedral, lesser churches of the Kremlin and the church of Izmaylovo Estate has disappeared, but the eight-level Baroque iconostasis of the Transfiguration church of Novodevichy Convent is extant in its original form. Zolotaryov also worked on the iconostasis and icons of the Donskoy Monastery and New Jerusalem Monastery, but these works were severely altered by later renovation and cannot be reliably attributed. Lev Naryshkin, who became chief of the Prikaz in 1689, assigned Zolotaryov to work on the interiors of the Church of Intercession in his Fili estate. The iconostasis and three icons signed by Zolotaryov (1692–1694) are also extant (the icon of Saint Stephan was relocated to Andrey Rublyov museum). More icons attributed to Zolotaryov are preserved in the Museum of Andrey Rublyov and in Novodevichy Convent. Icons attributed to Zolotaryov School are displayed at Ostankino Palace and other museums.

European Baroque influence was common among Moscow artists of the period (Vasily Poznansky, Bogdan Saltanov et al.); Zolotaryov's painting stands out among them for its use of contrasting shadows approaching that of the Italian chiaroscuro school, for its sculpture-like depiction of bodies and for its finely detailed depiction of clothing and crowns. The faces of saints share the same elongated, almond-shaped outline with thin, long noses and small mouths.

Presumably, the artist died or retired in 1698: in that year his name disappeared from known official records; his chair at the workshop passed to Ivan Refusitsky.

== See also ==
- List of Russian artists
