= Yakov Bukhvostov =

Russian architect and serf (fl. 1690s)

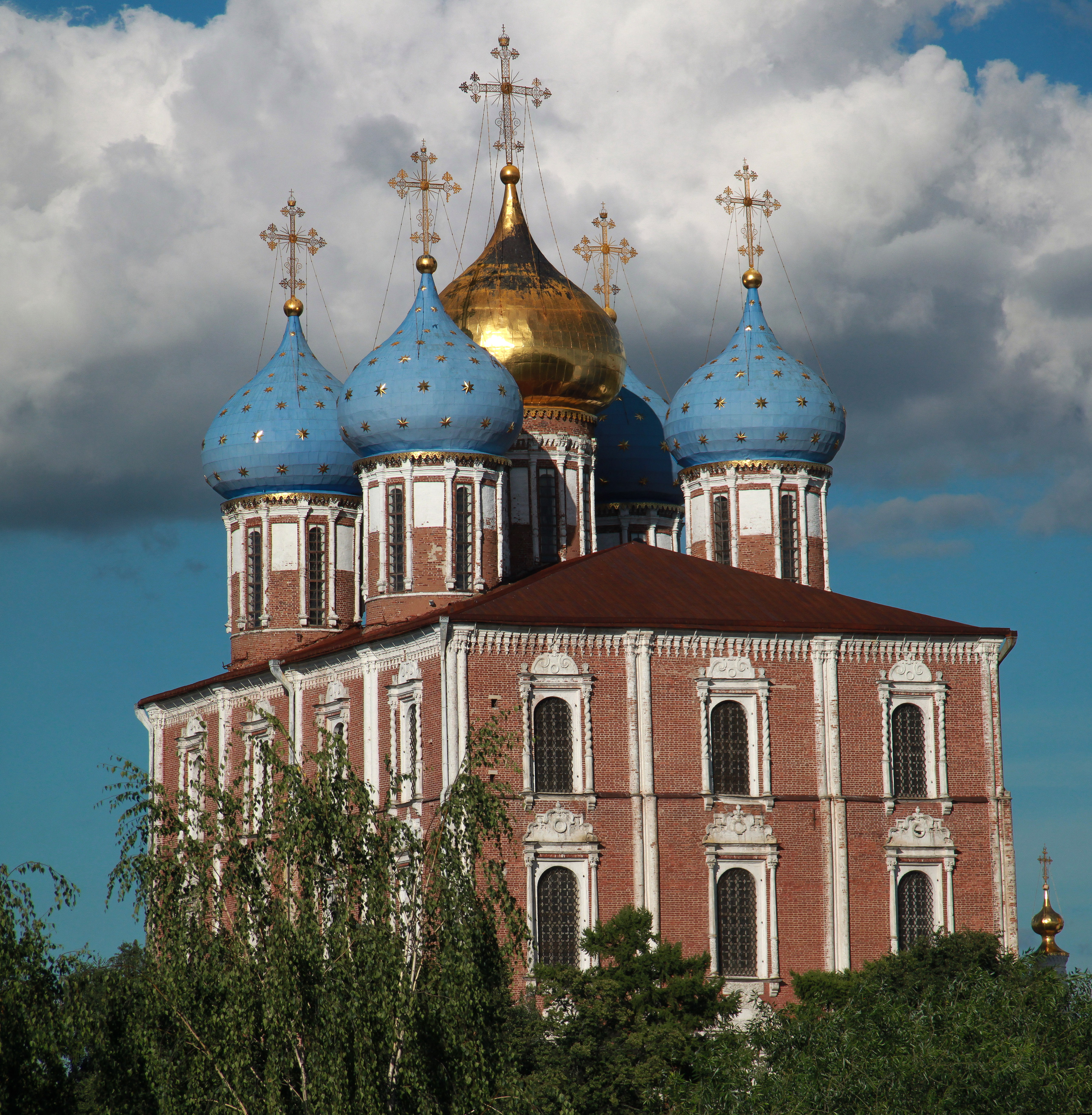
The Dormition Cathedral in Ryazan, built by Bukhvostov between 1693 and 1699

Yakov Grigorievich Bukhvostov (Russian: Яков Григорьевич Бухвостов), a serf of Russian boyar Mikhail Tatishchev, designed the so-called "octagon on cube" churches in the Naryshkin Baroque mode. He was active in the 1690s in Moscow and Ryazan, where he supervised the construction of the new Dormition Cathedral in the kremlin. His tower churches in Ubory and Troitse-Lykovo "may owe something to prototypes in wooden Russian architecture". They are built of brick and decorated with profuse white stone ornamentation. A soaring white tower in front of New Jerusalem Monastery was also built from Bukhvostov's designs. Other buildings attributed to him include the Fili and Zyuzino churches. Some of the attributions are far fetched, since "there is documentary evidence of his being in charge of constructing only a handful of buildings".

== Traditional account of Bukhvostov's activities ==
The biography of Bukhvostov is largely unknown. He was a serf assigned to the village of Nikolskoe-Sverchkovo, close to Dmitrov, which belonged to Tatishchev boyars. He was first mentioned by reliable sources in 1690, when he won a concession to build monk cells in the Moiseev Monastery in Moscow (the monastery was later demolished). After completing the cells Bukhvostov, with his people, started the construction of walls and towers of the New Jerusalem Monastery in present-day Istra. The walls and towers of the monastery bear almost no decoration, something which is not typical for Bukhvostov's style. The only exception is the Church of the Entry to Jerusalem built on the top of one of the gates. This church was apparently started by Bukhvostov, but completed by Filipp Papuga and brothers Leonty and Emelyan Mikhaylov, using Bukhvostov's plans.

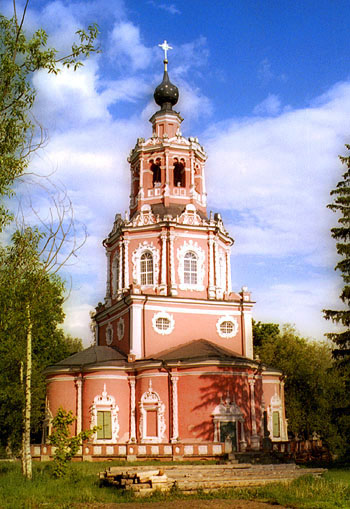
The Church of the Holy Mandylion in Ubory, constructed between 1698 and 1704

In December 1692, when the construction of the New Jerusalem monastery was still under-way, Bukhvostov obtained a concession to build The Assumption (Dormition) cathedral in Ryazan, where the old cathedral had collapsed. Very soon afterwards Bukhvostov got a commission from a boyar, Pyotr Sheremetev, to build the Church of the Holy Mandylion in the village of Ubory, close to Moscow. He failed to complete the church within two years, a requirement of the contract, and Sheremetev asked the authorities to place Bukhvostov under arrest. Under the imminent threat of arrest, Bukhvostov struck a deal with Sheremetev to complete the church in 1696. When he failed to do this either, Sheremetev had him arrested, but then realized that the church would never be completed with Bukhvostov in jail and asked the authorities to release him. The church in Ubory was completed in 1697, although Sheremetev was already dead.

Bukhvostov completed the Assumption cathedral in Ryazan during 1699 and went on to construct a number of churches in the same city. None of these churches have survived into this century. His last documented work (1698 — 1704) is the Trinity Church in Troitse-Lykovo, now within the city limits of Moscow. No details of the architect's later life survived.

== Oeuvres ==
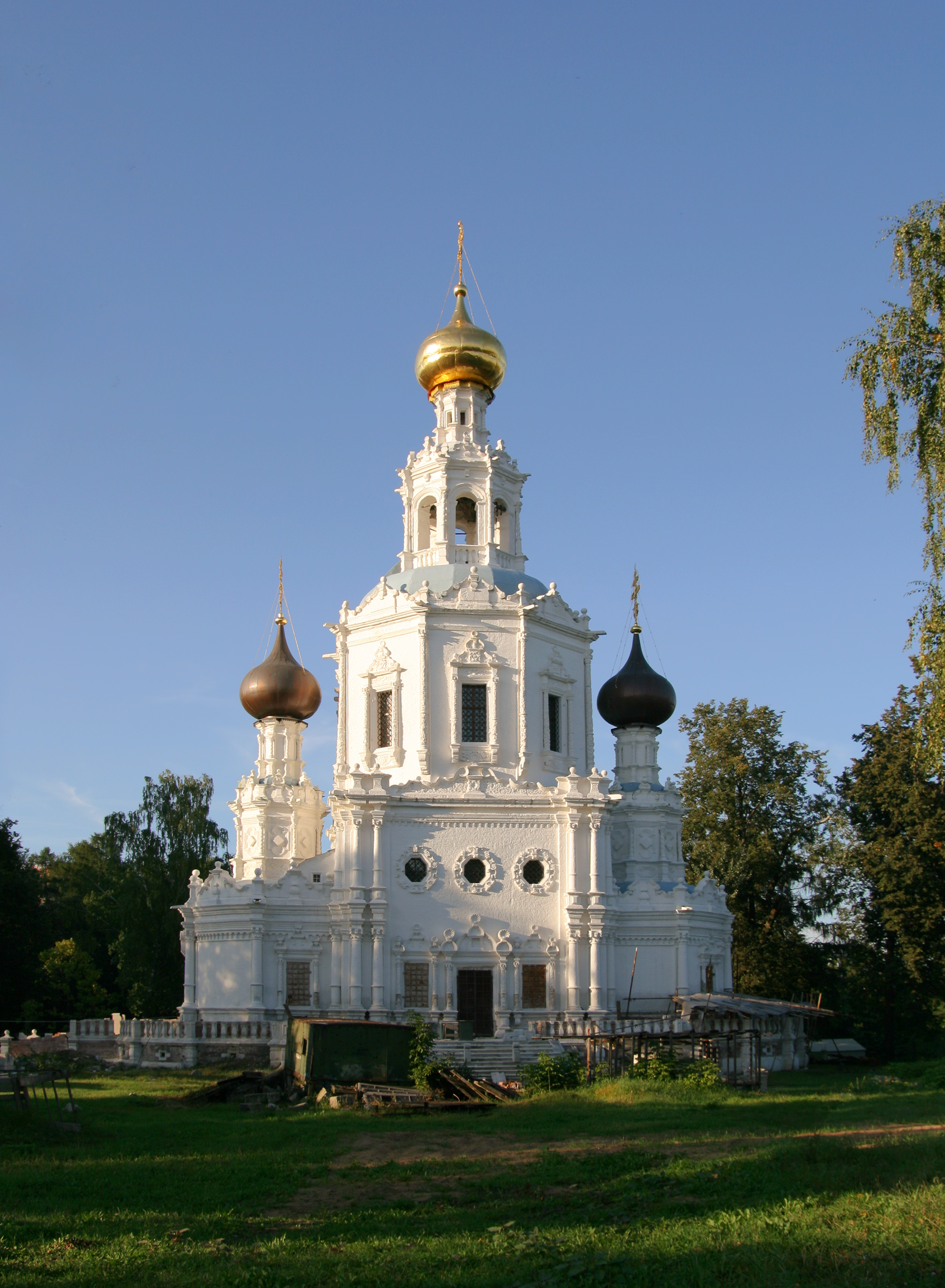
The Holy Trinity Church in Troitse-Lykovo, 1698 — 1704

The following buildings have been documented as having been constructed by Bukhvostov and his associates:

- The walls and towers of the New Jerusalem Monastery, including the Church of the Entry to Jerusalem, 1690 — 1697. Destroyed in World War II, subsequently restored.
- The Church of the Holy Mandylion in Ubory, 1694 — 1697.
- The Assumption (Dormition) Cathedral in Ryazan, 1693 — 1699.
- The Holy Trinity Church in Troitse-Lykovo, 1698 — 1704.

Besides these four, a number of churches somewhat similar in style have been attributed to Bukhvostov in some non-specialist literature, without any documented sources, just on the basis of the comparison of the style. These include:

- John the Baptist and Saint Spirit churches in the Solotcha monastery, close to Ryazan.
- The Church of Saints Boris and Gleb in Zyuzino, now in Moscow.
- The Church of the Intercession at Fili, now in Moscow.

== Bibliography ==
- С.И. Вавилов, ed. (1948). Люди русской науки: Очерки о выдающихся деятелях естествознания и техники (PDF). Moscow, Leningrad: Гос. изд-во техн.- теоретической лит-ры.
- Brumfield, William Craft (1997). Landmarks of Russian architecture: a photographic survey. Gordon and Breach. pp. 3, 137. ISBN 90-5699-536-7.
