= Fili (disambiguation) =

Fili may refer to:

- FILI – Finnish Literature Exchange
- Fili, a member of the class of poets in Ireland
- Fíli, a Dwarf from The Hobbit novel by J. R. R. Tolkien
- Fili (Moscow), a former village near Moscow, now a district in the same city; see also Church of the Intercession at Fili
- Fili (Metro), a subway station in Moscow
- Fyli, a town in Greece
