= Tamara Melenteva =

Russian professor and author

- Education: Moscow State University
- Occupations: professor, author

Tamara Melenteva (Russian: Тамара Ильинична Мелентьева) is a Russian professor and author. Melenteva is currently a professor at Ruslanguage Center for Russian Language Studies in Moscow.

Melenteva graduated from the Philology Department at Moscow State University specializing in teaching Russian as a foreign language and also has a degree in neuropsychology and psychology from Moscow State University.

Melenteva is the author of Обучение иностранным языкам в свете функциональной асимметрии полушарий мозга (Methods of Teaching Foreign Languages in the Light of the Functional Asymmetry of the Hemispheres of the Brain), Use Your Brains Right, The Vitruvius Formula, Отзвуки былых Времен: Из Русской Бытовой Культуры (Echoes of Olden Times), and Непропавшие сюжеты. Пособие по чтению для иностранцев, изучающих русский язык.

Melenteva's latest book, Echoes of Olden Times, published in 2012, covers various topics in Russian history, including the Mongol invasion of Rus', Russian church architecture, and Pushkin.
