= Filyovsky Park District =

Filyovsky Park District район Филёвский парк (Russian)
- District
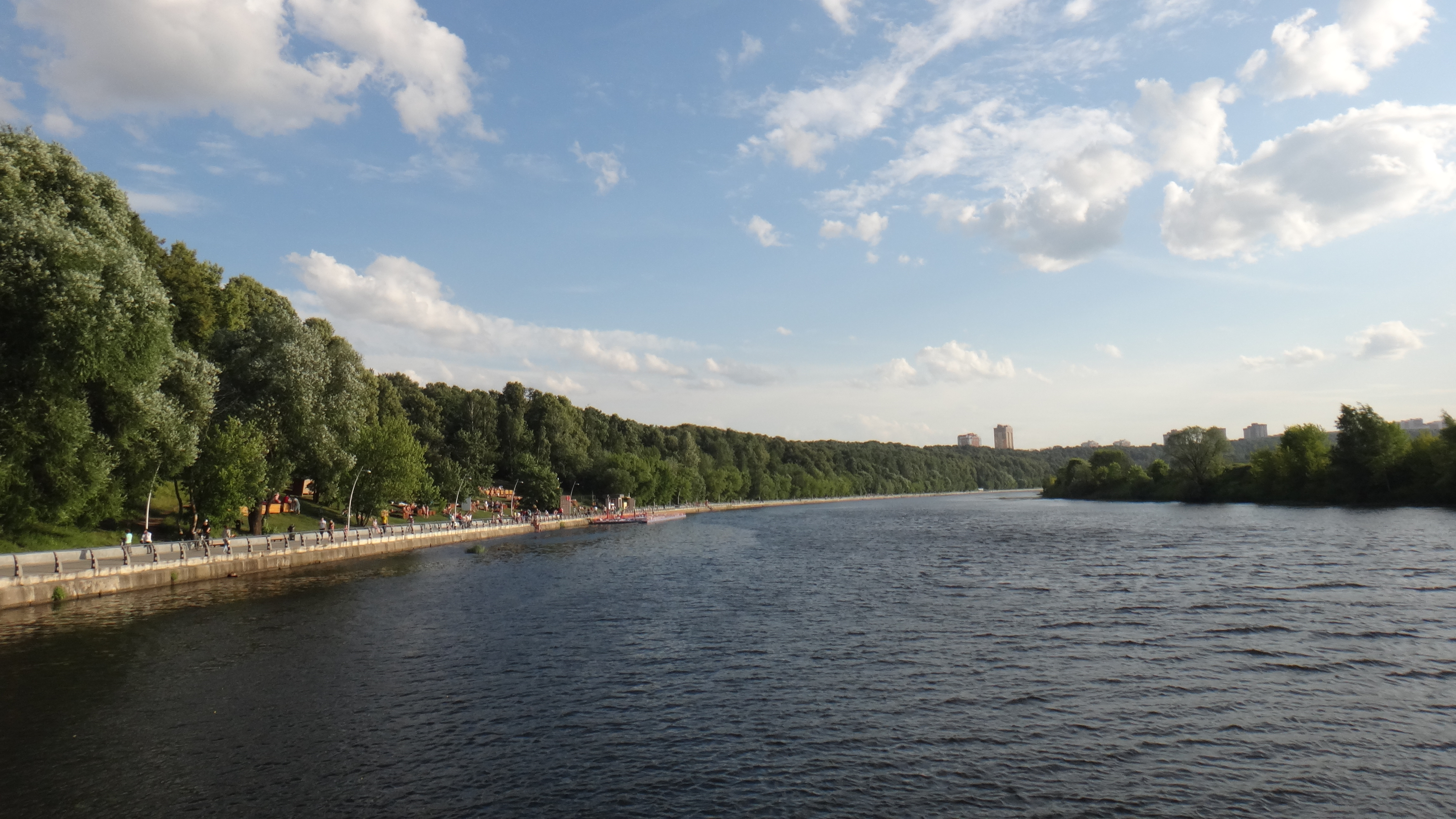
- Promenade on Moscow River, Filyovsky Park District

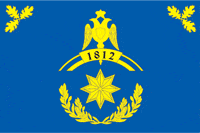
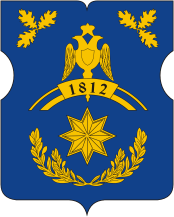
- Flag Coat of arms
- Location of Filyovsky park District in Moscow
- Coordinates: 55°44′58″N 37°30′05″E
- Country: Russia
- Federal subject: Moscow

Population (2010 Census)
  - Total: 89,513
  - Urban: 100%
  - Rural: 0%
- Time zone: UTC+
- OKTMO ID: 45328000
- Website: https://filevsky-park.mos.ru/

Filyovsky Park District (Russian: райо́н Филёвский парк) is a district of Western Administrative Okrug of the federal city of Moscow, Russia. The district is 6.5 km west of the center of the city, and its northern and eastern borders are the Moskva River. Located in the area are the Khrunichev State Research and Production Space Center, Church of the Intercession at Fili, Gorbunov Palace of Culture and Filevsky Park. The area of the district is 9.624 square kilometres (3.716 mi^{2}). Population: 89,513 (2010 census);, 66,775 (2002 census).

== See also ==
- Fili (Moscow)
