= Bogdan Saltanov =

Russian painter (1630s–1703)

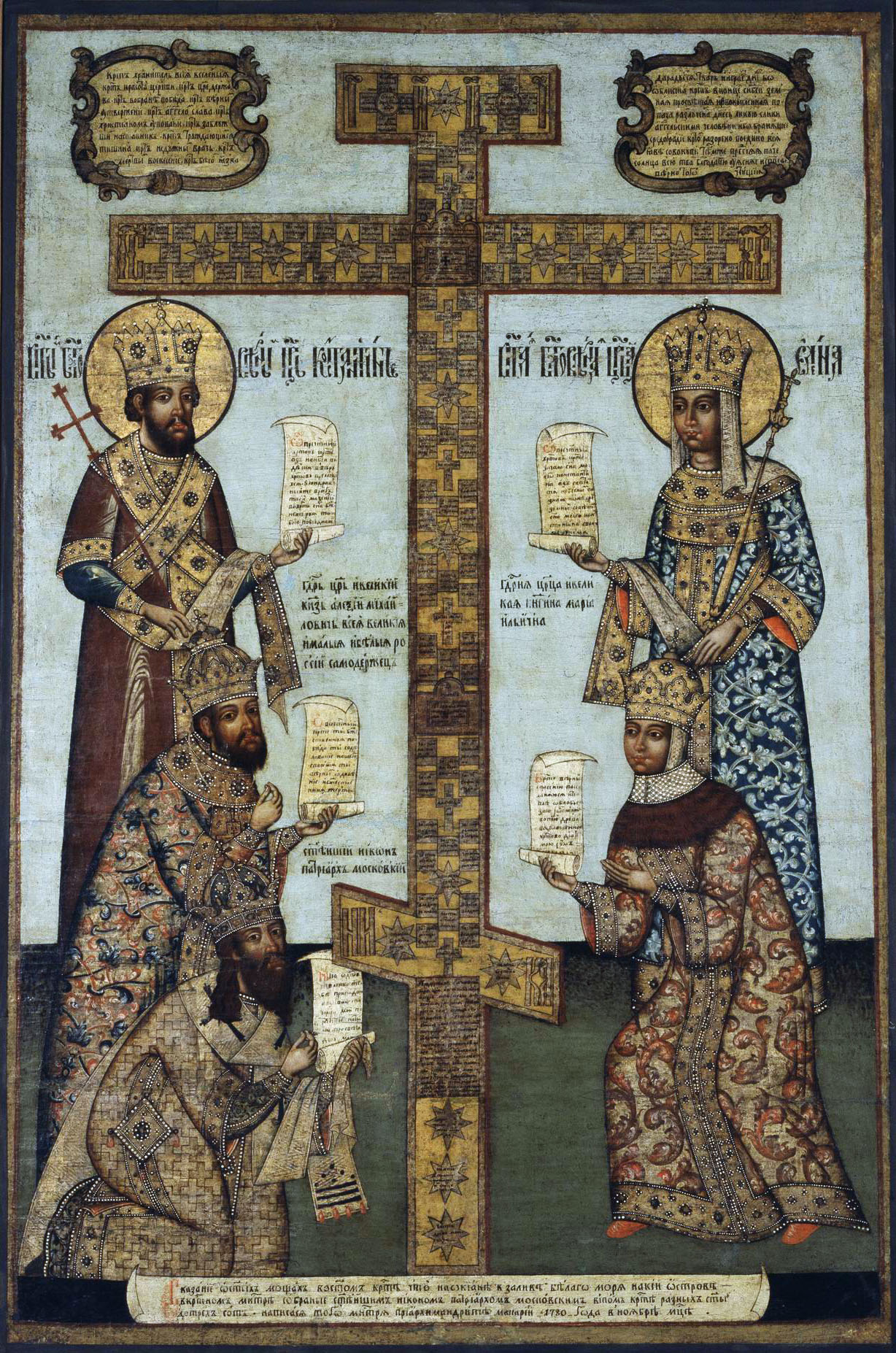
- Cross of Kiy of the Crucifix church in Moscow Kremlin, 1670s
- Born: 1630s New Julfa, Persia
- Died: 1703; Moscow, Russia
- Known for: Icons, engravings, interior decoration
- Patrons: Alexis I of Russia

Bogdan Saltanov (Russian: Богдан Салтанов; 1630s – 1703), also known as Ivan Ievlevich Saltanov, was a Persian-born Armenian painter at the court of Alexis I of Russia and his successors. Saltanov headed the painting workshop of the Kremlin Armoury from 1686. Saltanov's legacy includes Orthodox icons for church and secular use, illuminated manuscripts, secular parsuna portraits including the portraits of Stepan Razin and Feodor III of Russia as a young man (see Attribution problem).

Igor Grabar considered Saltanov and his contemporaries Ivan Bezmin and Vasily Poznansky as the fourth and the last class of Simon Ushakov school, an "extreme left wing in the history of Russian icon art, the Jacobins whose art departed with the last traces of an already evaporated tradition" (Russian: Они являются “крайней левой” в истории русской иконописи ушаковской эпохи — теми якобинцами, в искусстве которых исчезают последние следы и без того уже довольно призрачной традиции). Studies of the 1990s–2000s partially refute this statement, asserting that Saltanov was substantially independent of Ushakov and his legacy.

== Biography ==
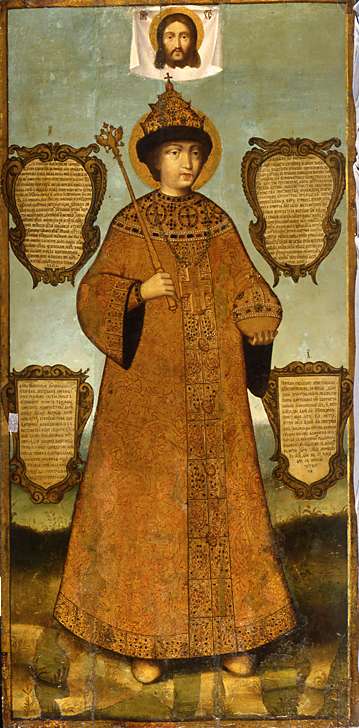
A portrait of Feodor III of Russia, commissioned by Sophia Alekseyevna in 1685, has been attributed either to Saltanov or to Ivan Bezmin

In 1660 Zakar Sagradov, an Armenian trader from New Julfa, serving as an envoy of the Shah of Persia, delivered the Shah's gifts to Tsar Alexis. The package included, among other items, an engraved copper board depicting the Last Supper. The board aroused the interest of the tsar who instructed Sagradov to return to Persia and hire the engraver into the tsar's service. Muscovite artists were only experimenting with engravings on metal, and the tsar needed a professional to set up the new craft. The copper board was, most likely, a Western European product, however, Sagradov responded that he can hire at least an apprentice of the author. Six years later Saltanov, "the apprentice", arrived in Moscow with his brother, joined the staff of the Armoury and received a high salary. He was treated as a foreign noble, an honor rarely issued without reason. The artist converted to Russian Orthodoxy eight years later: conversion was equivalent to an oath of loyalty to the Romanovs and earned him the honors of a Russian noble, but also prevented the artist from ever leaving Russia. His brother, Stepan Saltanov, also became a Russian noble, a treasurer of the Armoury and a founder of the Saltanov family.

Bogdan Saltanov became the last court painter hired before the death of Simon Ushakov, the undisputed leader of Muscovite art school. Ushakov rated Saltanov's skills as mediocre. Saltanov was the fourth foreign artist employed by the Moscow court (after the Swede Johann Deterson, hired in 1643, Pole Stanislaw Loputsky and Dutchman Daniel Wouchters). When Stanislaw Loputsky, chief of the court painters, left Moscow in the 1670s, his job was awarded to Ivan Bezmin with Saltanov second in command; Saltanov took the lead in 1686 following repressions against Bezmin. All the Slavic chiefs of painters' workshop, including Simon Ushakov, were naturally born nobles, and apparently, Saltanov was also recognized as such. Saltanov's earliest attested work was the tafta icons - icons painted on cloth with partial cloth application imitating garments of the saints. Igor Grabar suggested that this new genre of an icon was Saltanov's invention owing to his Oriental roots, but admitted that the painting itself was mediocre. "These strange tafta masters, so non-Russian in spirit, thought and feeling, terminated the history of Russian icon art." (Russian: Этими странными “тафтяными мастерами”, столь нерусскими по всему своему духу, по всем мыслям и чувствам, закончилась история русской иконописи).

Bezmin and Saltanov, as the workshop chiefs, were also teachers and mentors to the next generation of artists; there are 37 known trainees of Bezmin and 23 trainees of Saltanov, including Karp Zolotaryov. Their status at the court was radically different from that of traditional icon painters: Saltanov's primary function was to provide secular art for the court, not the church. Even when the subject of a painting was religious, its treatment was a step away from icon tradition into a "westernized", secular art. The earliest royal commissions of this kind (secular icons on copper and glass base) to Saltanov are attested to 1670 and 1671, and 1679 for Bezmin. As a result of this practice of the 1670s, the professions of court painters and icon painters in Moscow nearly merged, with court painters actively taking over the icon painters' church jobs.

Saltanov died in Moscow in 1703; assumptions that he left the country and returned to his homeland are now deemed incorrect. He was married twice, and his second wife was reported alive in 1716.

== Attribution problem ==
Saltanov remains a controversial figure: his activities in Moscow are extensively documented through extant archive records, but no single piece of art has been indisputably attributed to the artist. Saltanov, unlike Karp Zolotaryov, never signed his works, thus attribution is based on archive records kept by court accountants. All opinions on his artistic style are not more reliable than the underlying attribution of his least questionable works - the tafta icons and the portrait of Feodor III of Russia.

The portrait of Feodor III of Russia was commissioned by Sophia Alekseyevna in 1685 to Simon Ushakov and Ivan Maksimov, but both these icon painters declined the job, and it passed to Saltanov. The absence of records confirming payment for the job to Saltanov led Elena Ovchinnikova to assert in 1956 that it was not Saltanov's work (she attributed it to Bezmin). For the next decades, her opinion prevailed, but authors like M. M. Kazarian (1969) and Komashko (2003) returned the credit to Saltanov.

Attribution of the Cross of Kiy icon from the Crucifix church in Moscow Kremlin and its copies is equally disputed. Tradition starting with the 1907 work by A. I. Uspensky attributes these icons (or at least the original "Cross of Kiy") to Saltanov. Komashko (2003) refutes this attribution: the court records say that Saltanov painted a similar image of a crucifix but not the cross.

== See also ==
- List of Russian artists
- List of Iranian Armenians
