= New Jerusalem Monastery =

Russian monastery in Moscow Oblast

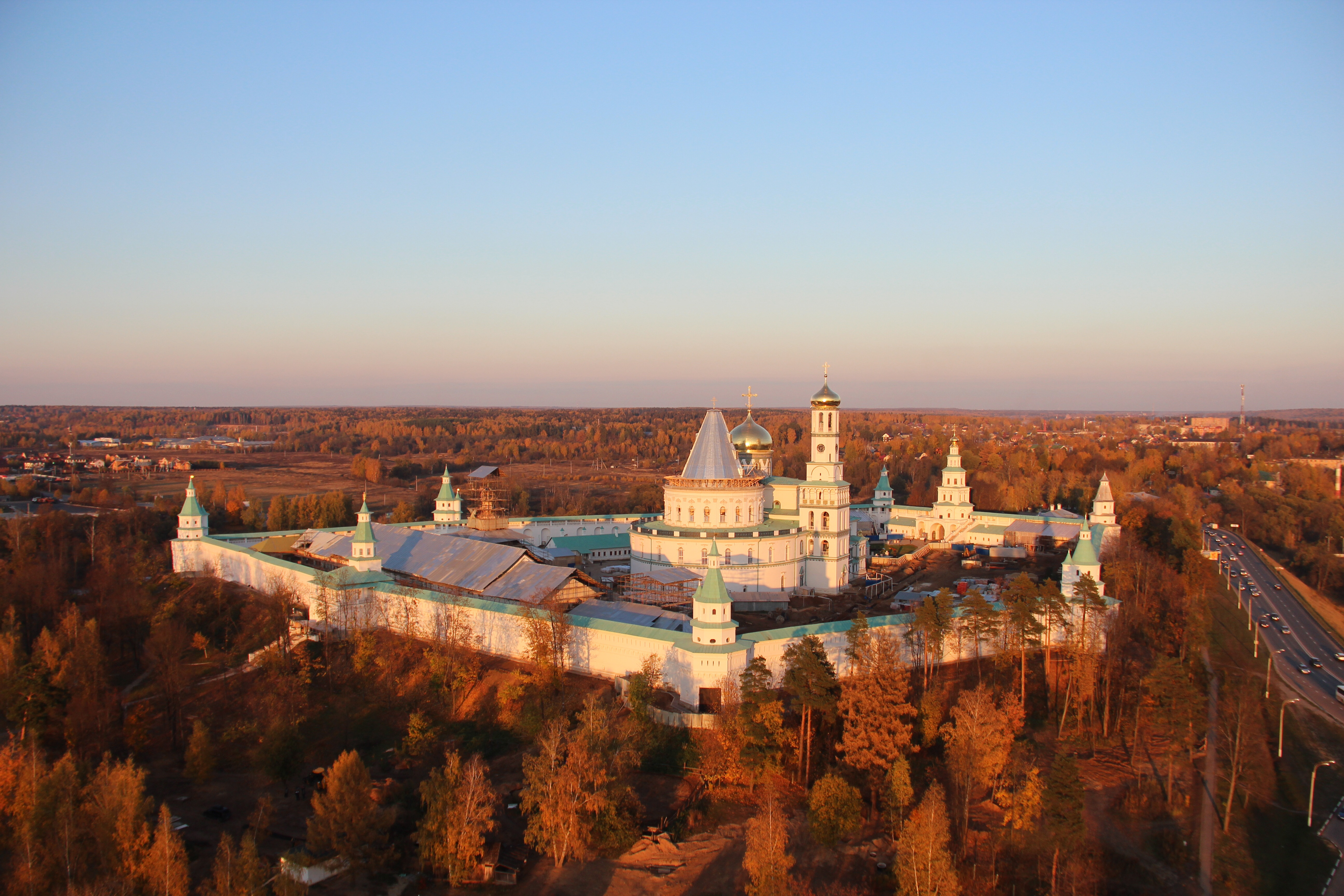
- The monastery under reconstruction (2014)
- Interactive map of New Jerusalem Monastery

Monastery information
- Order: Orthodox
- Established: 1656
- Diocese: Moscow Oblast

People
- Founder: Patriarch Nikon

Site
- Location: Istra, Moscow Oblast, Russia
- Coordinates: 55.9216°N 36.8459°E

The Resurrection Monastery (Russian: Воскресенский монастырь, romanized: Voskresenskiy monastyr') or New Jerusalem Monastery (Russian: Новоиерусалимский монастырь, romanized: Novoierusalimskiy monastyr') is a major monastery of the Russian Orthodox Church in Moscow Oblast, Russia.

The Voskresensky Monastery has given rise to the eponymous village, which has grown into the town of Voskresensk (currently known as Istra).

From 2010 to 2016, a large-scale restoration was carried out.

== History ==
The New Jerusalem Monastery was founded in 1656 by Patriarch Nikon as a patriarchal residence in the vicinity of Moscow. The monastery took its name from the concept of New Jerusalem. This site was chosen for its resemblance to the Holy Land. The River Istra represents the Jordan, and the buildings represent the 'sacral space' or holy places of Jerusalem.

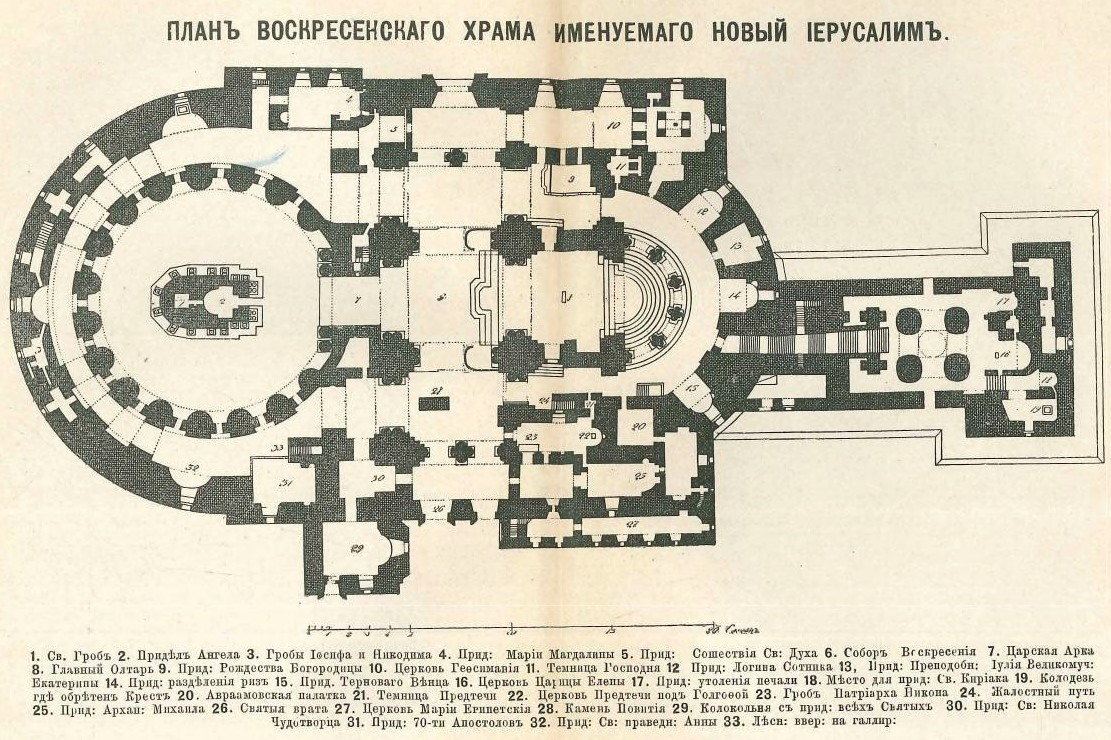
Katholikon of the Resurrection floorplan (1886 book)

In his time, Patriarch Nikon recruited a number of monks of non-Russian origin to populate the monastery, as it was intended to represent the multinational Orthodoxy of the Heavenly Jerusalem. By the patriarch's death in 1681, however, the building remained unfinished. His cleric Ioann Shusherin records that the royal family, in particular Tsarevna Tatyana and Regent Sophia, then oversaw the building work and ensured the buildings completion, finalised with its consecration in 1685. In the 17th century, the New Jerusalem Monastery owned a large library, compiled by Nikon from manuscripts taken from other monasteries. By the time of the secularization of 1764, the monastery possessed some 13,000 volumes.

In 1918, the New Jerusalem Monastery was closed down. In 1920, a museum of history and arts and another of regional studies were established on the premises of the monastery. In 1935, the Moscow Oblast Museum of Regional Studies was opened in one of the monastic buildings. In 1941, the German army ransacked the New Jerusalem Monastery. Before their retreat they blew up its unique great belfry; the towers were demolished; the vaults of the cathedral collapsed and buried its famous iconostasis, among other treasures . In 1959, the museum was re-opened to the public.

== Restoration and buildings ==
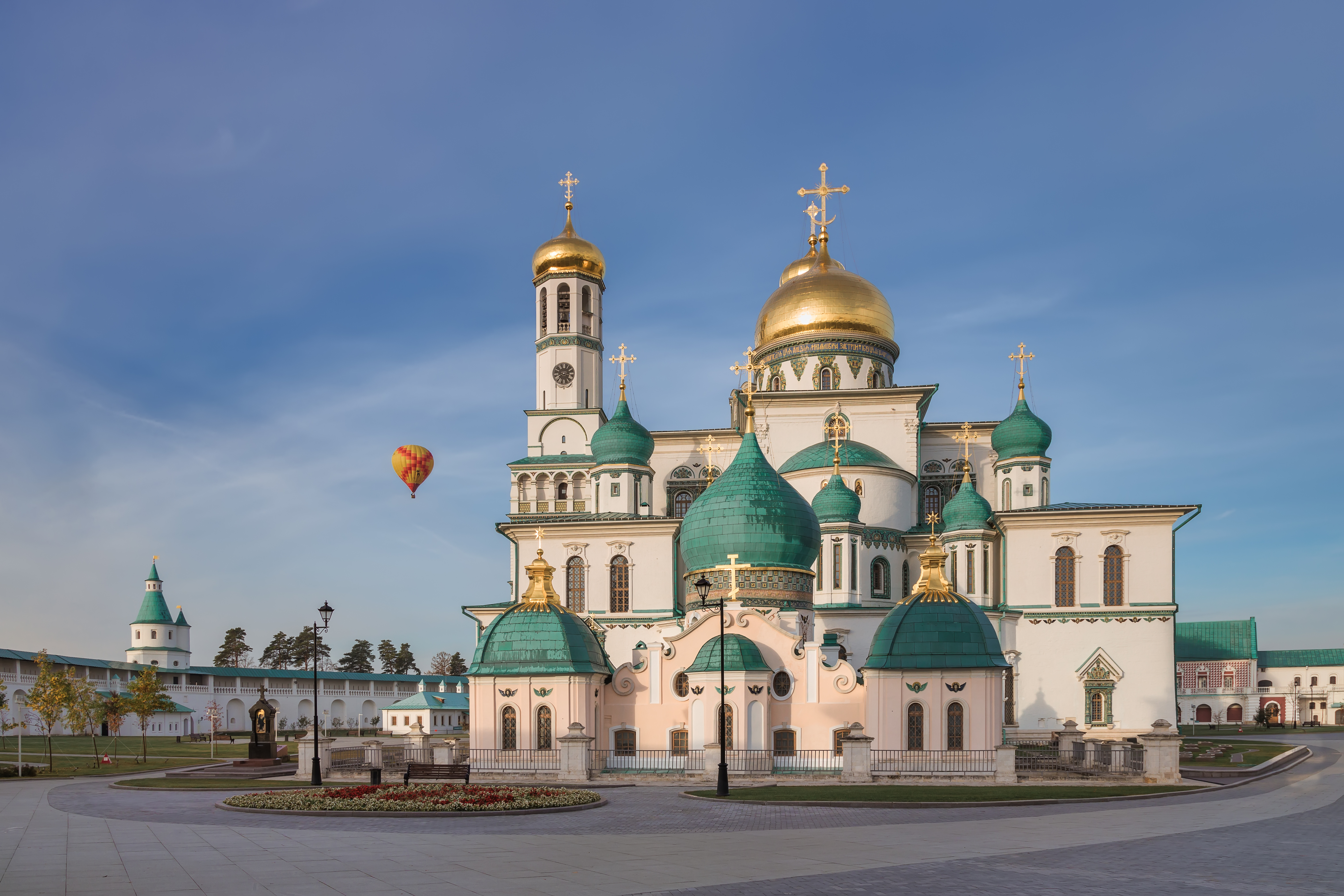
The katholikon is modeled after the Church of the Holy Sepulchre in Jerusalem

The New Jerusalem Monastery was re-established as a religious community only in the 1990s. The main buildings within the walled circuit are the following:

- The katholikon of the Resurrection (1656–1685) is a huge rotunda patterned after the Church of the Holy Sepulchre. The wooden dome and a cluster of neighbouring chapels are of later construction. These were designed by Francesco Bartolomeo Rastrelli, Vincenzo Bernardacci, Karl Blank, Konstantin Thon, and other leading architects of the Russian Empire.
- The 17th-century belltower has 7 stories rising to the height of 58 meters and features 15 bells (the largest weighing some 500 poods). Destroyed in 1941, the structure was not rebuilt until the 2010s.
- Patriarch Nikon's residence (1658)
- The stone wall with towers (1690–1694) was designed by Yakov Bukhvostov, a key proponent of the Naryshkin Baroque.
- Church of the Holy Trinity (1686–1698), like other major buildings, is finished with majolica and stucco moulding.

In March 2009 Russian president Dmitry Medvedev signed a presidential decree on the restoration and renovation of the New Jerusalem Monastery. The federal government was instructed to subsidize the monastery restoration fund from the federal budget from 2009, with deputy prime minister in Putin's cabinet, Viktor Zubkov estimating it will cost about 13–20 billion Russian roubles.

As of June 2016, there has been great restoration done in the main cathedral, with much of the interior reconstructed and readorned. The great belltower was rebuilt to old designs. The monastery is open to visitors and is actively serving again. Many thousands of visitors come each day, especially on holidays.
