= Naryshkin Baroque =

Russian architectural style

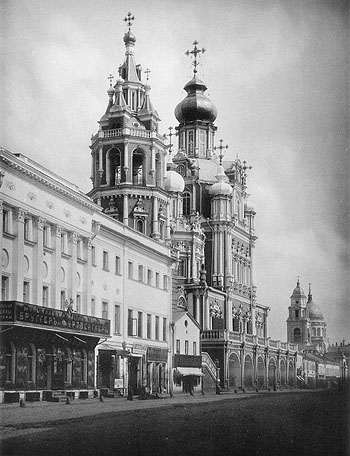
The Assumption Church on Pokrovka Street, Moscow is a notable example of Naryshkin Baroque architecture. This church is no longer standing, as it was demolished in 1936.

Naryshkin Baroque, also referred to as Moscow Baroque or Muscovite Baroque, is a particular style of Baroque architecture and decoration that was fashionable in Moscow from the late 17th century into the early 18th century. In the late 17th century, the Western European Baroque style of architecture combined with traditional Russian architecture to form this unique style. It is called Muscovite Baroque as it was originally only found within Moscow and the surrounding areas. It is more commonly referred to as Naryshkin Baroque, as the first church designed in this style was built on one of the Naryshkin family's estates.

== History ==
The first church built in the Naryshkin Baroque style was the Church of the Intercession of the Holy Virgin in the village of Fili, that was built on the estate of the Naryshkin family, who were Moscow boyars. The member of this family that is most related with this style of architecture is Lev Kirillovich Naryshkin, the uncle of Peter the Great. Lev Naryshkin erected this first church with the help of an architect, who is presumed to be Yakov Bukhvostov. This church became the staple of the Naryshkin Baroque style and inspired the building of other churches in this style within Moscow.

Naryshkin Baroque was contrasted with the Petrine Baroque, which was favored by Peter the Great and used widely in St. Petersburg. The contrast of these two styles are exemplified by the color, form, scale, and the materials used. The St. Peter and Paul Cathedral in St. Petersburg, and the Menshikov Tower in Moscow, are notable examples of the Petrine Baroque style.

== Style ==
The churches designed in the Naryshkin Baroque style were often built in red brick, which differed them from other buildings of the time. They were also thoroughly decorated with details in white limestone. The structure of the building was also different from anything else being built in Russia at the time. This architectural style was classified as "under the bell" or "under the ring" (Ru. под звоном). Churches that are "under the bell" mean that the bell tower is placed on top of the main volume, instead of next to the building as was common in the 17th century.

The bell towers were often built in the shape of an octagon, with the main volume of the building being a quadrangle. This octagon on quadrangle shape was a classic Baroque composition for churches. The window trimmings were decorated, as on all Baroque style temples. Cupolas replaced the tented roof, which was previously widespread in Russian church architecture. These placed upon a high drum created feeling of loftiness and impression of a variety of forms. The design for octagon on quadrangle churches was originally believed to have been taken from Ukrainian Baroque architecture, but further research proved that that wasn't true, as the first church built in this style was in Russia.

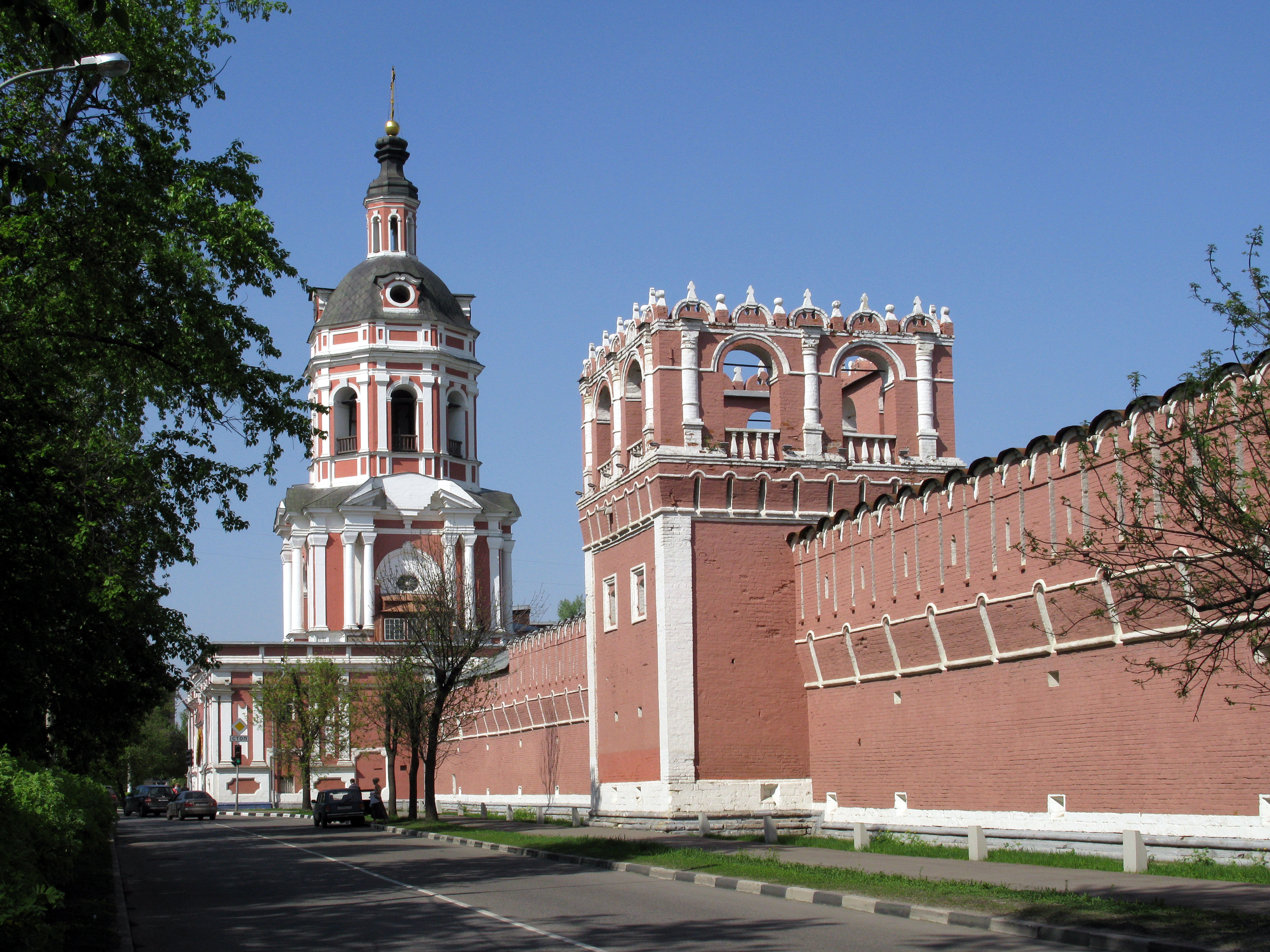
Donskoy Monastery in Moscow

The style spread continually, even to architecture that wasn't religious architecture. Many monasteries remodeled their walls and buildings in this style, as it was the latest fashion. The most notable examples of these monasteries were the Novodevichy Convent and the Donskoy Monastery in Moscow. There are some examples outside of Moscow as well; Krutitsy, Metochion and Solotcha Cloister are near Riazan. Non-religious architecture adopted this style as well, as could be seen in the Sukharev Tower in Moscow.

In the 1730s, the Naryshkin Baroque style ended and it evolved into the Rastrelliesque, or the Elizabethan Baroque style.

== Notable architects ==
The most important architects that worked in the Naryshkin Baroque style were Yakov Bukhvostov and Pyotr Potapov.

=== Yakov Bukhvostov ===
Yakov Grigorievich Buhvostov was born in the mid 17th-century, as a serf to Mikhail Tatishchev. The Tatishchev family were influential Boyars in Nikolskoe. Little is known about the early life of Bukhvostov, only that he was granted his freedom in the 1690s, when he was recognized as a great architect.

The most notable example of his work as an architect is the Church of the Savior in Ubory.

=== Pyotr Potapov ===
Pyotr Potapov is the hypothetical architect of the Church of the Assumption of the Holy Virgin on Pokrovka.

Nothing is known about his life, or if he was even a real person. His name is known exclusively by the inscription on the Assumption Church, which reads "The summer of 7204 (1699) October 25 is the work of human hands, the work of Pyotr Potapov" (Russian: лета 7204 [1699] октября 25 дня дело рук человеческих, делом именем Петрушка Потапов). From this inscription it is unclear whether he was the architect or the stone carver, but it is believed that he was the architect.

== Examples ==
Title	Date	Architect	Photo	Notes
Church of the Intercession of the Holy Virgin in Fili (Russian: Церковь Покрова Пресвятой Богородицы в Филях)	1690–1693	Yakov Bukhvostov (presumed)		
Church of the Savior in Ubory (Russian: Церковь Спаса Нерукотворного Образа в Уборах)	1690–1697	Yakov Bukhvostov		
Saratov Holy Trinity Cathedral (Russian: Свято-Троицкий собор в Саратове)	1689–1695	(?)		
Church of the Sign of the Blessed Virgin on Sheremetev Courtyard (Russian: Церковь Знамения Пресвятой Богородицы на Шереметевом дворе)	1691	(?)		
Church of the Holy Apostles Peter and Paul in Petrovsko-Razumovsky (Russian: Церковь Святых Апостолов Петра и Павла в Петровско-Разумовском)	1691	(?)		The Church of Peter and Paul was demolished in 1934 due to the creation of a railway through its location.
Church of Our Lady of Vladimir at the Vladimirskiye Gates (Russian: Церковь Иконы Божией Матери Владимирская у Владимирских ворот)	1691–1694	(?)		The church was demolished in 1934 during the demolition of Kitay-gorod city wall.
Church of the Trinity in Troitskoye-Lykovo (Russian: Церковь Троицы Живоначальной в Троицком-Лыково)	1694–1697	Yakov Bukhvostov		The dates that this church was built has also been stated as 1690-1695 and 1698-1703.
Epiphany Cathedral (Baptism of the Lord) (Russian: Богоявленский Собор (Крещения Господня))	1693–1696	(?)		
Church of the Assumption of the Holy Virgin on Pokrovka (Russian: Церковь Успения Пресвятой Богородицы на Покровке)	1696–1699	Peter Potapov	19th-century postcard of Pokrovka Street in Moscow	The Church of the Assumption of the Holy Virgin was demolished in 1936, on the pretext of the sidewalk being expanded.
Sukharev Tower (Russian: Сухарева башня)	1692–1701	Mikhail Choglokov	Suharev Tower in Moscow. Postcard, 1927	Suharev Tower was demolished in 1934 by order of Lazar Kaganovich, Secretary of the Moscow City Committee. It took place during reconstruction of the city ordered by Joseph Stalin, that gave birth to Stalinist architecture. It was said that the tower blocked traffic.

== See also ==
- Octagon on Cube
- Siberian Baroque
- Russian architecture
