= Bochka roof =

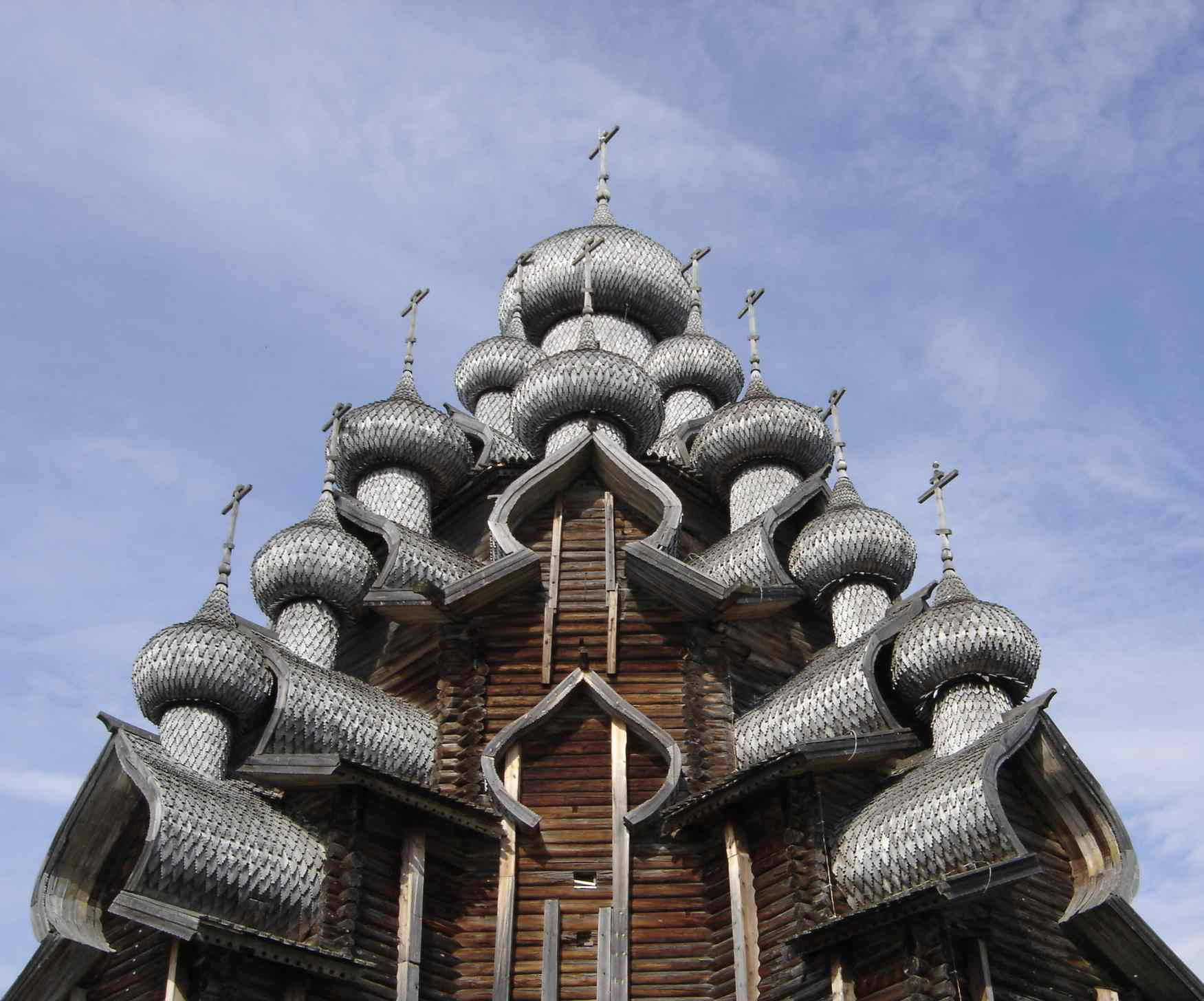
The bochka roofs of the Transfiguration Church in Kizhi, holding onion domes above. 18th century.

A bochka roof or simply bochka (Russian: бочка, barrel) is a type of roof in traditional Russian church architecture that has the form of a half-cylinder with an elevated and pointed upper part, resembling a pointed kokoshnik. In English the term barrel roof is sometimes used, but this may cause confusion since Russian external barrel roofs are simply curved roofs resembling the inside of a cut-away barrel.

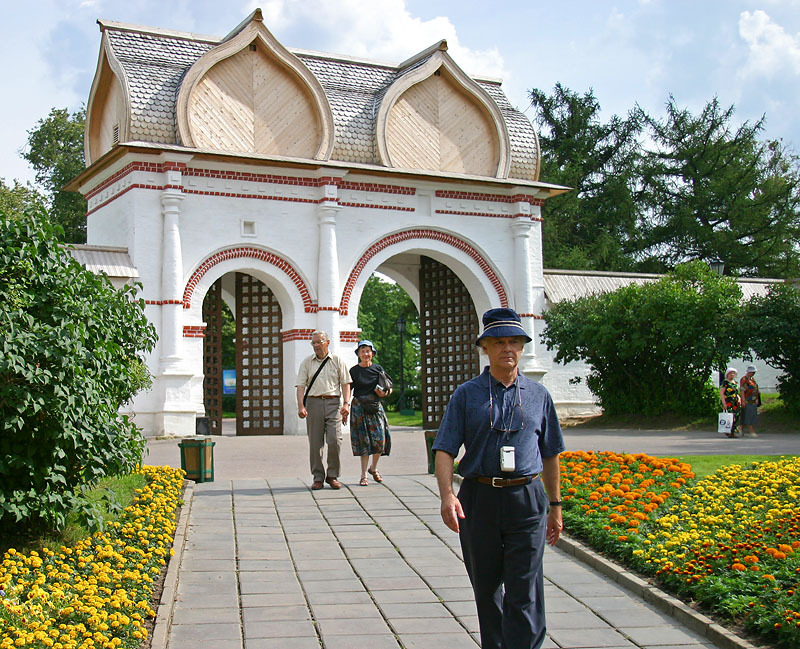
Stone gates in Kolomenskoye, covered with wooden double cross bochka roof. 17th-century.

Typically made of wood, the bochka roof was extensively used both in church and civilian architecture in the 17th to 18th centuries. Later it was sometimes used in Russian Revival style buildings.

The intersection of two bochkas forms a so-called cross bochka (Russian: крещатая бочка), or cube cover (Russian: кубоватое покрытие).

== See also ==
- List of roof shapes
- Kokoshnik (architecture)
