= Russian church architecture =

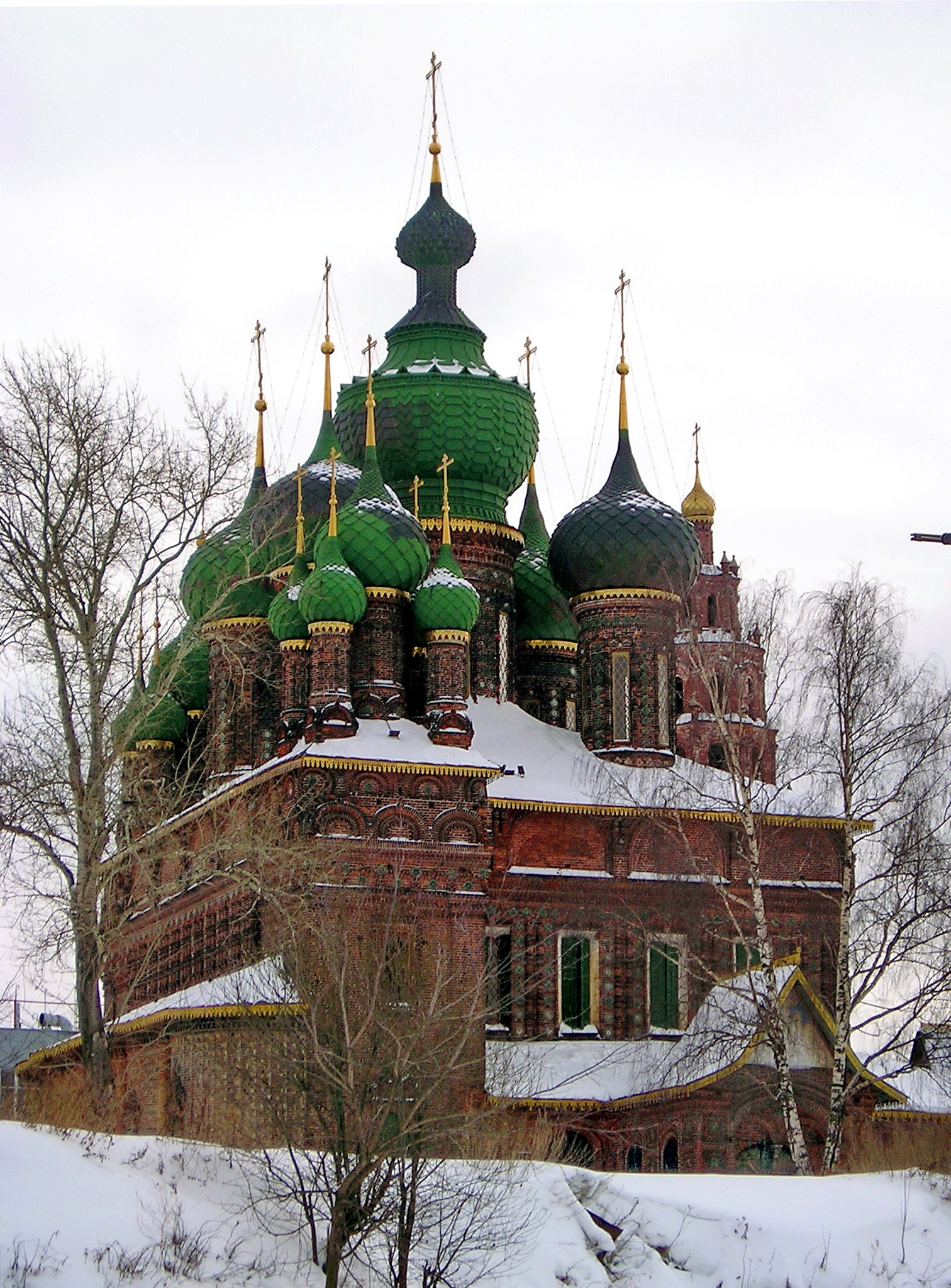
The Tolchkovo Church (1671–1687) is representative of the last phase of medieval Russian architecture. It is characterized by elaborate brick tracery and the vertical ascent of its 15 domes.

Russian churches often have various recurrent elements in their architecture. The onion dome is for example a recurrent and important element in the architecture of Russian churches. Often Russian churches have also multi-colored filigree ornamental elements. Furthermore the colour white plays an important role in the style of Russian churches. In the past, Russian churches were made out of wood. Many Russian Orthodox churches are distinguished by their verticality, bright colors and multiple domes, which provide a striking contrast with the flat Russian landscape, often covered in snow. The first churches in Kievan Rus', such as the 13-domed wooden Cathedral of St. Sophia, Novgorod, differed in this regard from their mainly single-dome Byzantine predecessors. The number of domes was important symbolically. One dome symbolized the single God; three represented the Trinity, and five represented Christ and his four evangelists. At first, the baptistery, narthex, and choir gallery above the narthex were a common feature of Russian churches, but gradually they disappeared. After a century of Byzantine imitations, the Russian masons began to emphasise the verticality in church design.

The late 12th century saw the development of so-called tower churches in Polotsk and Smolensk; this design later spread to other areas such as Kiev and Chernigov. A visual transition between the main cube of the church and the elongated cylinder below the dome was provided by one or several rows of curved corbel arches, known as kokoshniki. They could be spade-shaped, semi-circular, or pointed. In later Muscovite churches, the massed banks of kokoshniki evolved into a distinctive pyramidal shape. After Moscow emerged as the new center of Russia in the 15th century, church forms remained distinctly Russian. The reign of Ivan the Terrible (1533–1584) was marked by the introduction of so-called tented roofs. Churches such as St. Basil's Cathedral were an agglomeration of chapels capped by the steeply pitched conical roofs of fanciful designs.

The architects of Vladimir-Suzdal switched from brick to white limestone ashlar as their main building material, which provided for dramatically effective church silhouettes, but made church construction very costly. The ornamentation combined native carpentry, oriental, Italian Renaissance, and German Gothic motifs. The architects of Novgorod and Pskov constructed their churches of fieldstone and undressed blocks of limestone. As a result, the north-western buildings have highly textured walls, as if hand-moulded of clay. A trefoil façade with pointed gables was a common arrangement in the later Novgorod Republic. The churches of Pskov were tiny and gabled; they developed an enclosed gallery which led to a porch and a simple belfry, or zvonnitsa.

The dominant concern of late medieval Russian architecture was the placement of the belfry. An early solution to the problem was to put the belfry above the main body of the church. Detached belfries with tent roofs are exceedingly common in the 17th century; they are often joined to the church by a gallery or a low elongated narthex. The latter arrangement is known as the "ship design", with the belfry rising above the porch serving as the prow. The Muscovite Baroque churches represent the tiered structure of traditional Russian log churches "in which a pyramidal silhouette ascends in a series of diminishing octahedrons". This type of the church is known as the "octagon on cube" church.

== Aesthetic and spiritual considerations ==
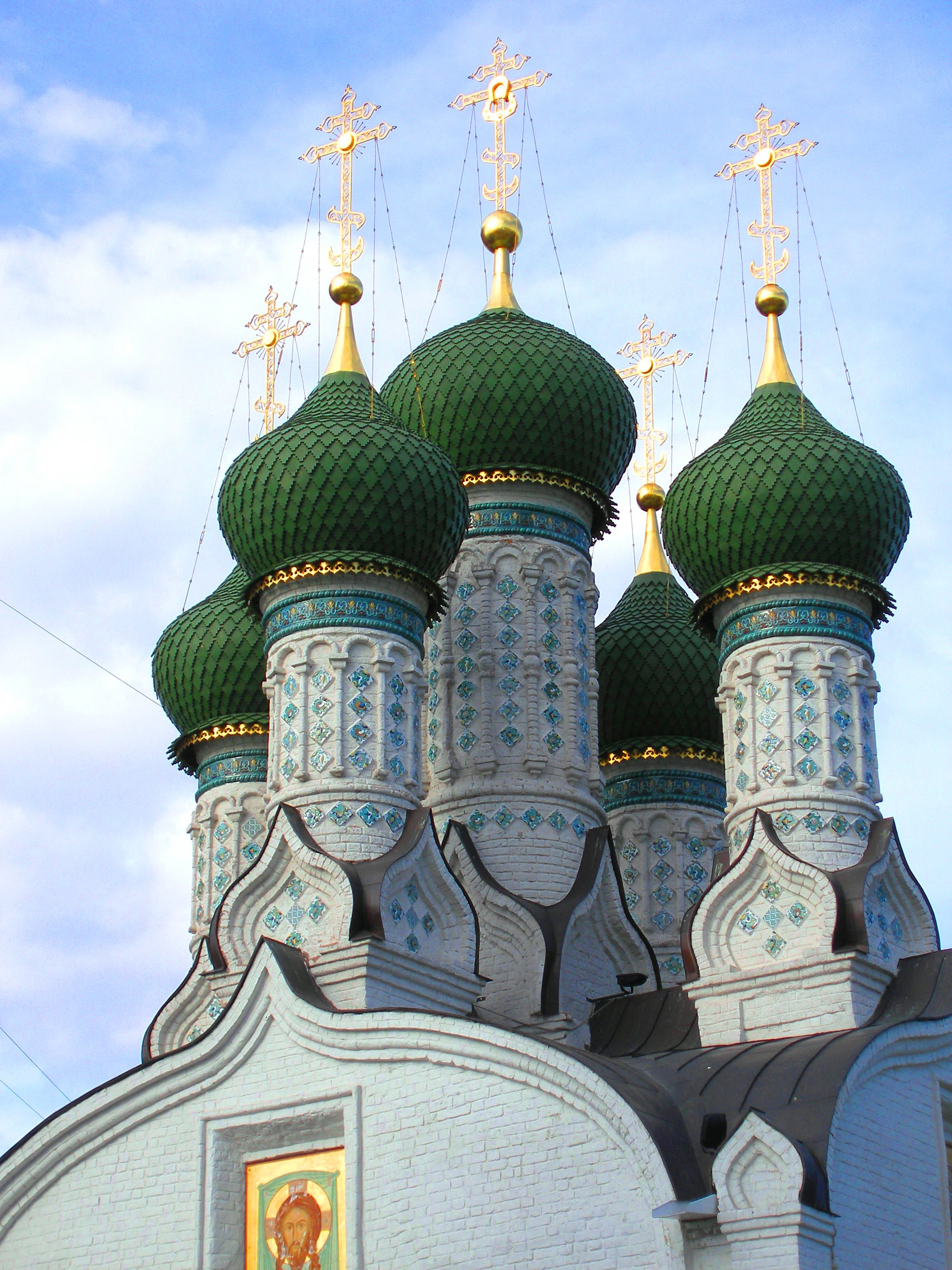
A rare bochka roof church from 1672

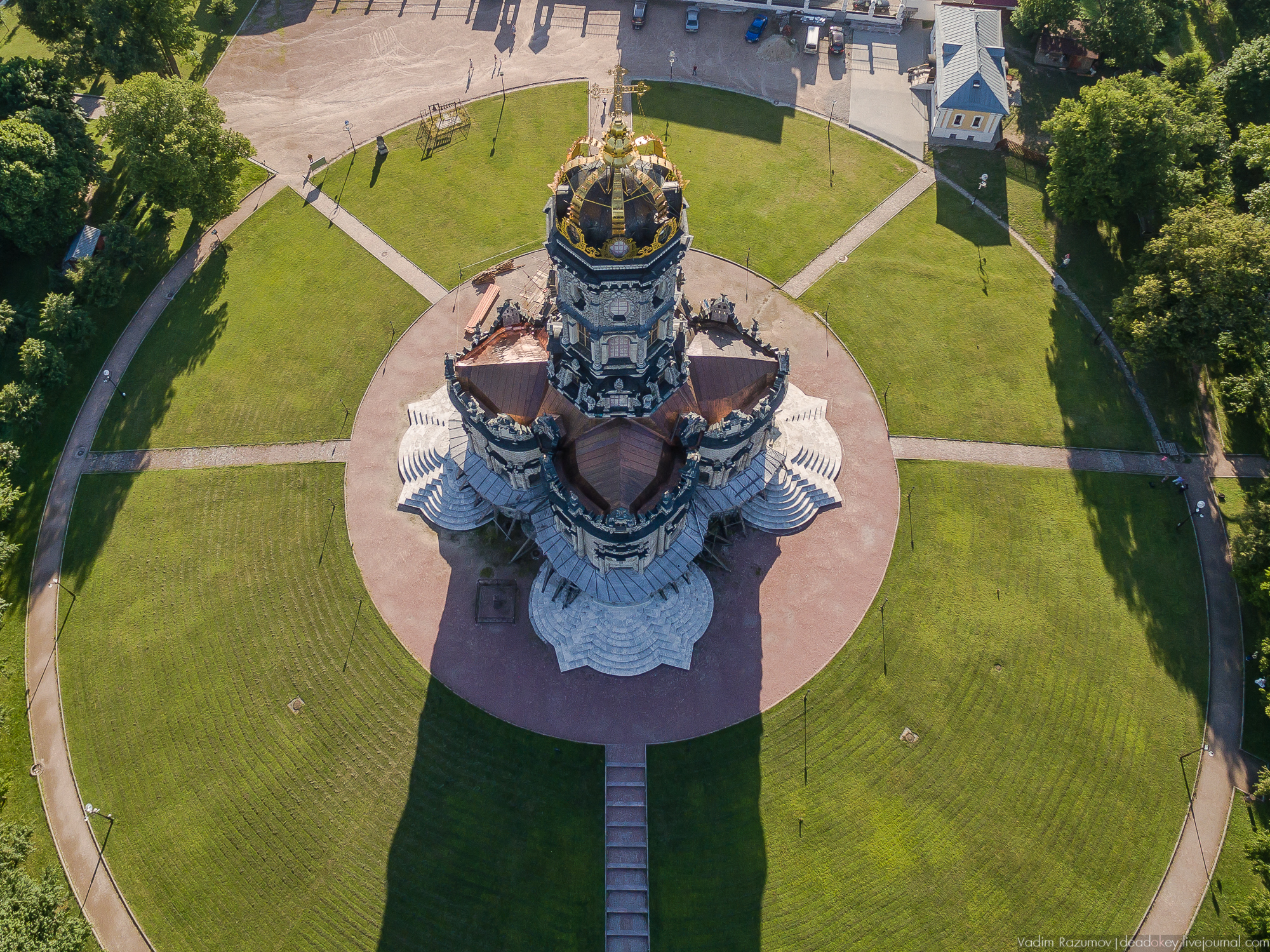
A Westernized "four-petal" church from the 1690s

Aesthetics are a central component of Russian Orthodox worship services; nowhere is this more evident than through the study of the architecture of Russian churches and cathedrals. Services are designed so as to stimulate the five senses, and the structure and layout of the churches themselves regulate the sensory perceptions of the worshipers. The mystic environment cultivated through church services is enhanced through the regulation of light, movement, smoke, and sound. Icons, visual representations of holy figures, are the most ancient and important visual aspect of worship. Icons adorn the space in a multitude of ways and become a part of Orthodox churches’ architecture.

An old Russian chronicle records that Vladimir the Great (c. 1000) was unable to decide which faith to proclaim as his own and his people’s until his envoys reported from Constantinople that they had witnessed magnificent services there: "We knew not whether we were in heaven or on earth," they exclaimed, "for on earth there is no such splendour or such beauty, and we are at a loss to describe it. We know only that God dwells there among men." Intended to induce an awareness of the divine on Earth, the rituals of the Russian Orthodox Church are organized so as to engage all five senses. The church ceremonial combines visual, auditory, tactile, and olfactory phenomena to produce "the highest synthesis of heterogeneous artistic activities", all to be absorbed by both active and passive participants’ senses. Pavel Florensky notes the comprehensive and sensual nature of the aesthetic experiences offered through Russian Orthodox liturgy in his 1922 article "The Church Ritual as a Synthesis of the Arts".

The architecture of Russian Orthodox cathedrals is planned so as to constitute the unifying element for the sensory experience of the Orthodox worship service. Church architecture controls the level of natural light within the spaces of the building, directs the movement of the congregation through the proportions of the space, enhances the acoustics of church song, and defines certain spaces as more holy than others so as to distinguish the space of the clergy (behind the iconostasis) and that of the parishioners (in front of the iconostasis). The architecture of church buildings has a direct effect on the liturgy throughout worship service. Florensky argues:

in a church everything is interlinked: church architecture, for example, takes into account even so apparently minor an effect as the ribbons of bluish incense curling across the frescoes and entwining the pillars of the dome, almost infinitely expanding the architectural spaces of the church with their movement and interlacing, softening the dryness and stiffness of the lines and investing them with movement and life, as if melting them.

Aesthetics are paramount to Orthodox worship. The architectural components of Orthodox churches work so as to emphasize all the sensory aspects of the worship service – down to the smoke emanating from the burning incense – in order to provide worshippers with an experience of the godly. The experience of the Lord, the purpose of worship itself, is achieved through the architectural makeup of the church.

Naturally, it is the interior architecture of cathedrals that provide the most magnificent setting for Orthodox liturgy. Rather than being merely an aesthetic backdrop to the rituals of the clergy, cathedral architecture is planned so as to enhance the experience of worship. A cathedral’s architecture, therefore, becomes an active participant in the sensory experience of the parishioners during Orthodox ritual. Further, the architecture of the church is planned so as to enhance the actions of the clergy; this is related to the strong mystic aspect of the church born out of Orthodoxy’s Byzantine roots. The clergy become a central component of the aesthetic experience of the worship service. The architecture of the surrounding building, evenly distributed light, swirling incense smoke, and resounding sound of the worship service all work together to create the aesthetic experience of the Orthodox form of worship. Church architecture does not constitute a background to the Orthodox service; rather, church architecture is central to the actions of the service itself.

Many have argued the architecture of the Orthodox churches is more important than the icons they hold. Icons themselves serve not only as holy objects but also as architectural components of the churches and cathedrals in which they belong. Russian scholar Evgeny Nikolayevich Trubetskoy describes the importance of church architecture within and around the Orthodox icons. He writes that "the church and its icons form an indivisible whole" and that "every icon has its own special internal architecture" which, though important in and of itself, is ultimately subordinated to the architecture of the church in which the icon resides. The placement of icons within the church is not merely intended to display the divine. Rather, icons are a part of the church itself. They not only channel the divine in and of themselves, but they also play a part in the creation of the entire aesthetic experience of Russian Orthodox worship. Florensky argues iconographic paintings are solely intended for use within churches, and that their purpose is skewed when seen under any other circumstances. Icons, and the sense of divinity that they invoke through their visual beauty, are a part of the architectural structure of Russian Orthodox churches.

Russian Orthodox churches contain many ritualistic components that are inseparable from the architecture of the building. The mosaics, murals, and icons that are installed on the church iconostasis define the wall as a spiritual barrier that can only be crossed by the clergy. The wall and its decorations become inseparable from the architecture of the church—they fulfil both aesthetic and structural functions. The inclusion of mosaics and icons as artistic components of churches has remained central to the architecture of Russian Orthodox churches throughout the history of the religion; icons have been a part of the Russian faith since its adoption of the Byzantine traditions. Florensky refers to "wall-painting" as "that noblest form of fine art" to be found in Russian Orthodox churches. The wall paintings enhance the architecture of the church and contribute to the sensory experience. Visually, the wall art of the church provides a greater sense of immersion with the divine for the parishioners; this is further enhanced through the usage of the iconostasis to protect the mystery of the sacraments. Murals, frescoes, and mosaics work with architecture to enhance and divide the space of Russian Orthodox churches.

== Traditional church designs ==
This is a list of Russian masonry church types as they evolved away from the squat Byzantine models of the 11th century and acquired a pronounced tendency toward the vertical.

Type	Characteristics	Time and place	Examples
Byzantinesque churches supported by piers
Churches with more than six piers	Eight or ten cruciform, octagonal, or round piers support the roof with one, three, or five domes	The major churches of Kievan Rus', 11th century	
Churches with six piers	Six cruciform, octagonal, or round piers support the roof with one, three, or five domes. The three interior bays are delineated by three pilasters on the north and south facades.	All major cathedrals, 11th to 18th centuries	
Churches with four piers	Four cruciform, octagonal, or round piers support the roof with one, three, or five domes. As a result, there's a tripartite facade on each side of the building.	Most common arrangement, 11th to 18th centuries	
Churches with two piers	Two cruciform, octagonal, or round piers support the roof with one, three, or five domes. As a result, there is no clear relation between the interior bays and the design of the facade.	Cathedrals and churches in provincial towns, 16th to 18th centuries	
Evolution of four-piered churches
Gabled churches	Either a trefoil facade with pointed gables or a scalloped-wave cornice beneath the dome	Novgorod and Pskov, 12th to 16th centuries	
Tower churches	The ascent of semicircular or pointed gables (zakomary), culminating in an elongated cylinder under the dome, creates a vertical thrust that is reinforced by the tapering shape of pilasters and the vertical arrangement of apses, porches, and chapels.	Polotsk, Smolensk, Chernigov, late 12th and early 13th century; Vladimir-Suzdal and Moscow until the 15th century	
Bell-tower churches	The church is surmounted by a bell tower, with several rows of curved corbel arches (kokoshniki) serving as a visual transition between the two.	Moscow, 15th and 16th centuries	
Tent-roof churches
Tent-roof pillar churches	The church building is capped by a pitched conical ("tent-like") roof.	All over Russia, from 1530s to 1650s	
Many-chapelled churches	The votive church consists of several interconnected chapels capped by pillar-like and/or tent-like roofs.	Moscow and Staritsa, mid-16th century; extremely rare	
Churches with tent-like domes	The church has two or more domes shaped like tapering towers.	All over Russia from 1620s to 1650s	
Combinations of onion domes and tent-roofs	An archaizing four-piered church on an elevated base with five outsize onion domes is surrounded by an enclosed gallery leading to several chapels, porches, and belfries of various shapes and sizes.	Rostov, Abraham Bogoyavlensky cathedral 1550s, Yaroslavl and Upper Volga region, 1640s to 1680s	
Churches without piers
Pskov parish churches	Tiny single-dome gabled churches lacking in ornamentation. They often have an enclosed gallery leading to a porch and a simple belfry.	Pskov, 14th to 17th centuries	
Godunov-style churches	A cuboid church with no piers is capped by a pyramid of spade-shaped corbel arches (kokoshniki) leading to a single cupola	Moscow, 1590s to 1640s	
Ship-like parish churches	A cuboid, usually five-domed church with no piers and a pyramid of kokoshniki is connected by a covered gallery (refectory or vestibule) to a tent-like bell tower (the prow) over the western porch.	Moscow, from 1650s onward	
Round churches
Rotunda churches	The churches are circular, semicircular or elliptical in plan	Occasional examples from 12th to 17th centuries; extremely rare	
Octagonal bell-tower churches	A low cubic church is encircled by several chapels and surmounted by a succession of diminishing octagonal forms, with the upper level serving as a belfry	Moscow and Moscow region; 1680s to 1710s (see Naryshkin Baroque)	
Octagonal pillar churches	The "octagon on a cube" church morphs into an ornate church tower which bears no similarity to the Byzantine architectural tradition (see Menshikov Tower)	Moscow and Moscow region; 1690s to 1720s	

== See also ==
- Eastern Orthodox church architecture
- List of buildings of pre-Mongol Rus'
- List of tallest Eastern Orthodox church buildings

== Sources ==
- Brumfield, William Craft (2 December 2013) [1997]. Landmarks of Russian Architect. Routledge. ISBN 978-1-317-97325-6.
- Kizenko, Nadieszda (2007). "church architecture, Russian Orthodox". In Smorodinskaya, Tatiana; Evans-Romaine, Karen; Goscilo, Helena (eds.). Encyclopedia of Contemporary Russian Culture. Routledge. pp. 106–107. ISBN 978-0-415-32094-8.
- Rappoport, Pavel. Drevnerusskaya arkhitektura. Stroyizdat, 1993. ISBN 978-5-274-00981-2.
- Shvidkovsky, Dmitry (1 January 2007). Russian Architecture and the West. Yale University Press. ISBN 978-0-300-10912-2.
- Zagraevsky, Sergey. Typological forming and basic classification of Ancient Russian church architecture. Saarbrücken, 2015. ISBN 978-3-659-80841-8
