= Bochka (Music Subgenre) =

Subgenre of industrial techno music

Bochka is a subgenre of industrial techno music that is built around punishing, repetitive kick drums. The name literally translates to "barrel" and the genre began to emerge in the mid-2010s. Tempos can range from 155 bpm to 200 bpm.
