= Peter Potapov =

Hypothetical Russian architect

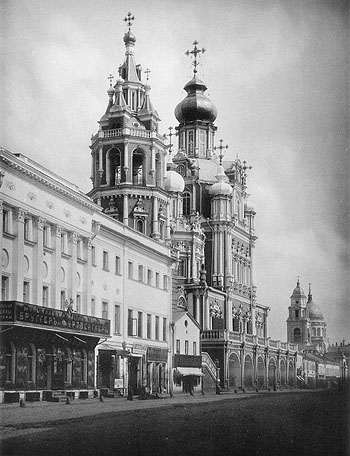
The Church of the Assumption of the Holy Virgin

Pyotr Potapov (Russian: Пётр Потапов, also written as Peter Potapov), is the hypothetical architect of the Church of the Assumption of the Holy Virgin on Pokrovka.

Nothing is known about his life. It is not even known if he was a real person. His name is known exclusively by the inscription on the Assumption Church, which reads "The summer of 7204 (1699) October 25 is the work of human hands, the work of Pytor Potapov." (Russian: лета 7204 [1699] октября 25 дня дело рук человеческих, делом именем Петрушка Потапов). From this inscription it is unclear whether he was the architect or the stone carver, but it is believed that he was the architect.
