= Fili (Moscow) =

Coordinates: 55°45′N 37°30′E

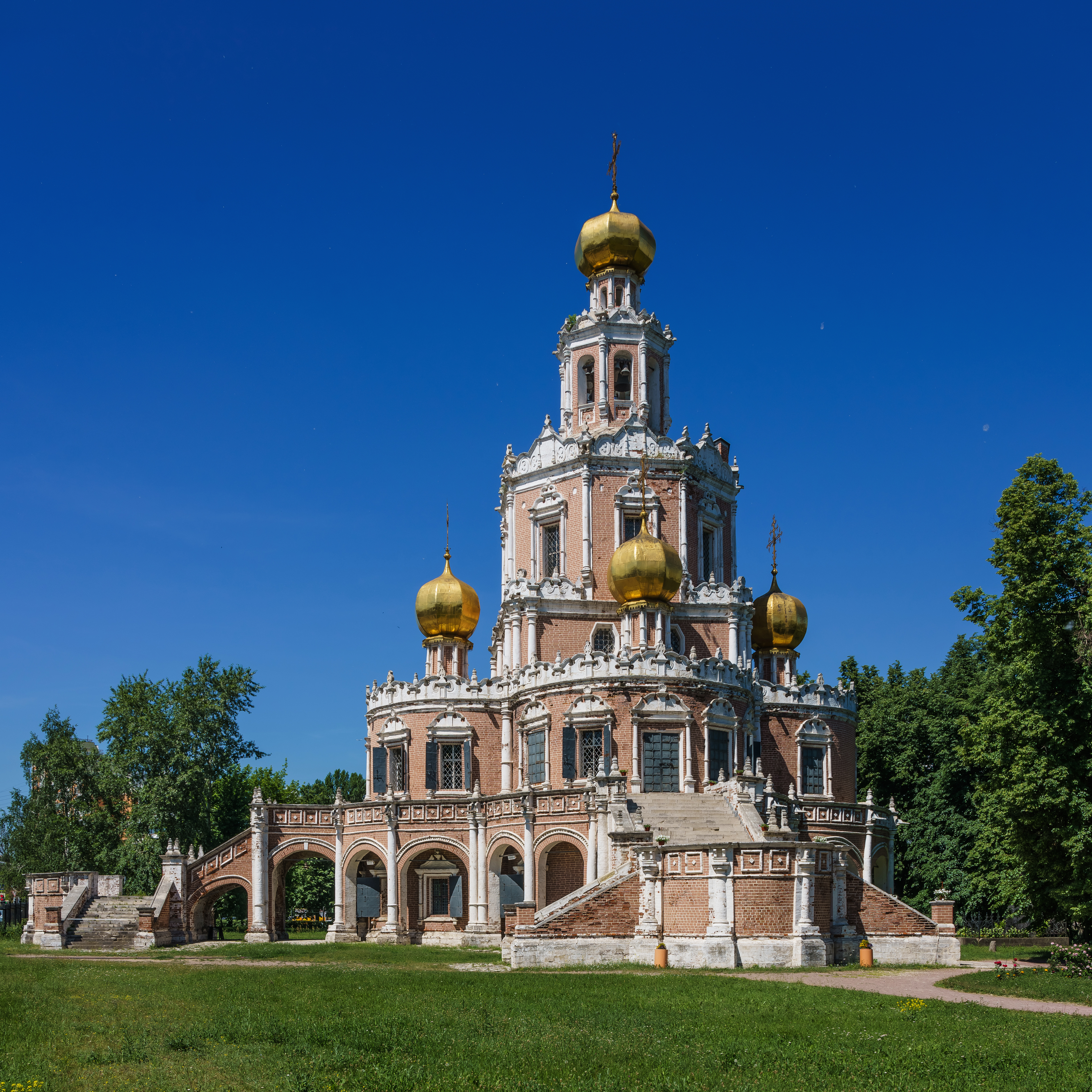
Church of Intercession in Fili

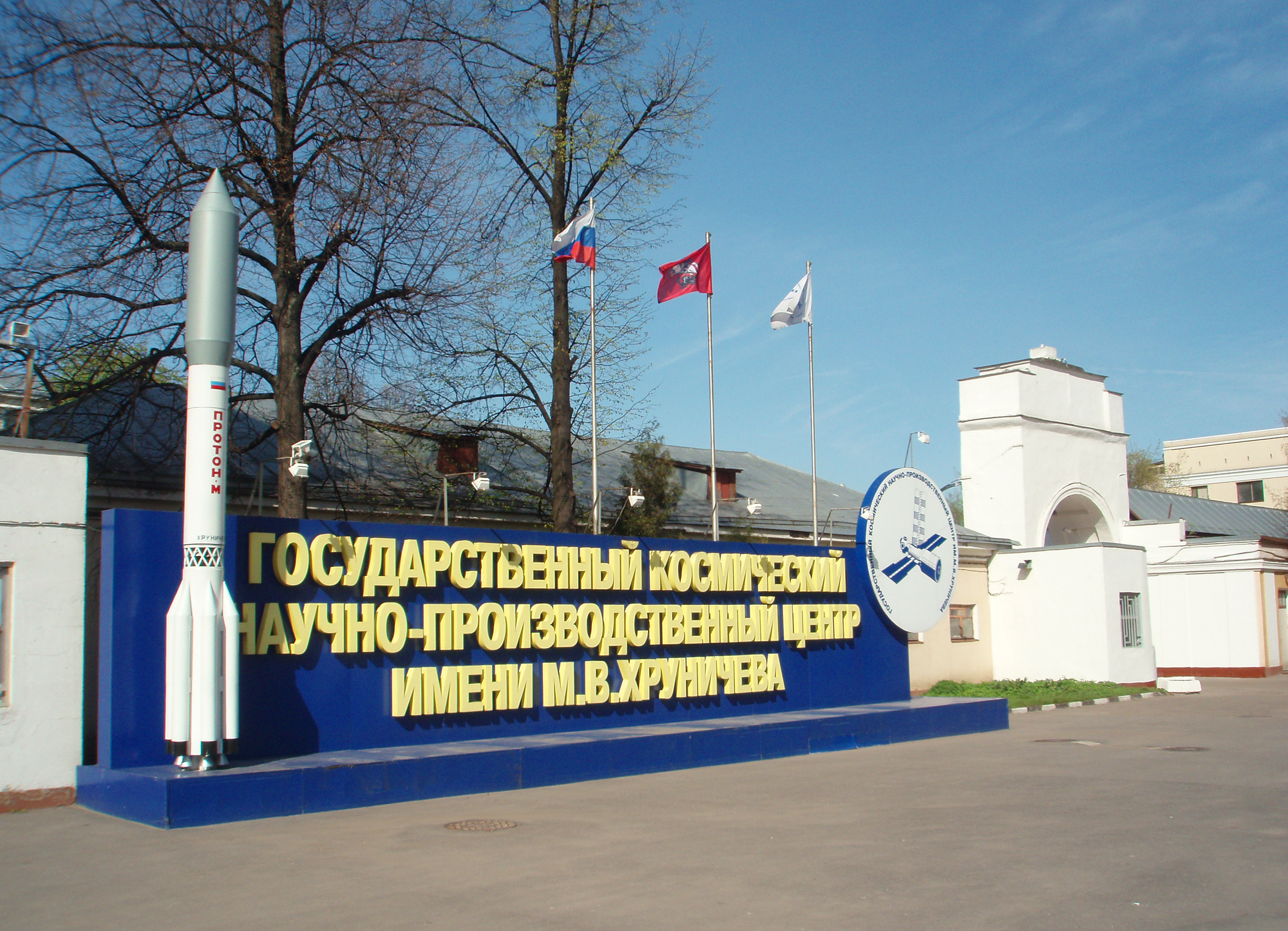
Entrance to Khrunichev aerospace plant in Fili

Fili (Russian: Фили́) is a former suburban village, now a neighborhood in the western section of Moscow, Russia, notable for the events of September 1812, following the Battle of Borodino. The village was located between the Moskva River and Poklonnaya Hill, near the present-day Fili station of Moscow Metro and the extant Church of the Intercession at Fili. The territory is administered by Filyovsky park District (another related territory, Fili-Davydkovo District, lies southwest of historical Fili).

== History ==
The first mention of Fili is dated 1627. From 1689, Fili, Kuntsevo, and adjacent settlements were owned by Lev Naryshkin, brother of tsaritsa Natalia Naryshkina. By 1694, he completed the Intercession Church, with donations by Peter I; its style is now known as Naryshkin Baroque. Naryshkin also established a new Fili village, closer to present-day Kutuzovsky Prospekt; the old Fili was remodelled into his personal estate.

After the Battle of Borodino (September 7, 1812), the Russian army retreated east, and camped near Fili on September 12. A dedicated military council led by General Kutuzov assembled in a wooden hut in Fili; despite objections from younger generals such as Pyotr Konovnitsyn and others, Kutuzov insisted on his plan to abandon Moscow, saving the remains of the Russian army. They marched through Moscow on September 14, followed by Murat's vanguard.

Fili was heavily industrialized between the 1900s and the 1930s, and by 1926 it had 396 households and 1,342 residents; in 1935, the territory was annexed by the City of Moscow. A notable feature of Fili is the Khrunichev aerospace plant; its first stage was built before World War I by Roman Klein. In the 1920s, renamed State Aircraft Plant No. 7, it acquired German technology in a joint venture with Junkers, producing local copies of Junkers K30 bomber, and vastly expanded afterwards. In 1926, this became Zavod 22, where the aircraft of Andrei Tupolev were developed.

== See also ==
- Church of the Intercession at Fili
- French invasion of Russia (1812)
