= Octagon on cube =

Type of architectural composition

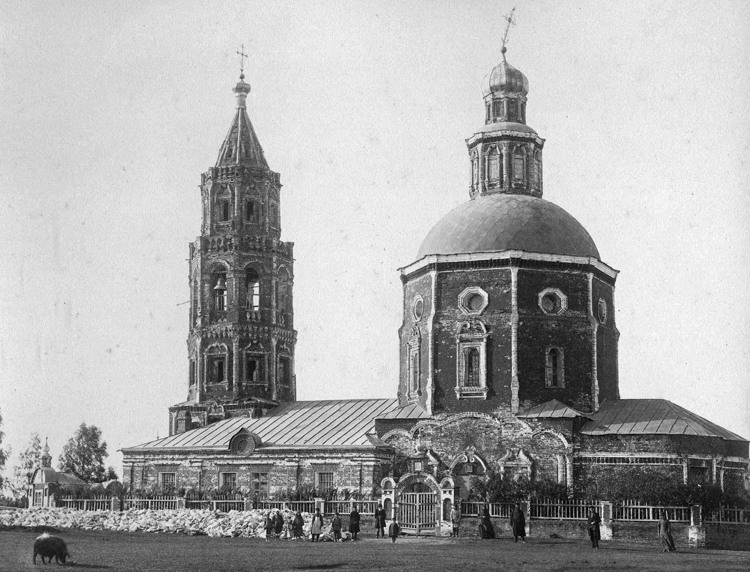
A Naryshkin style church

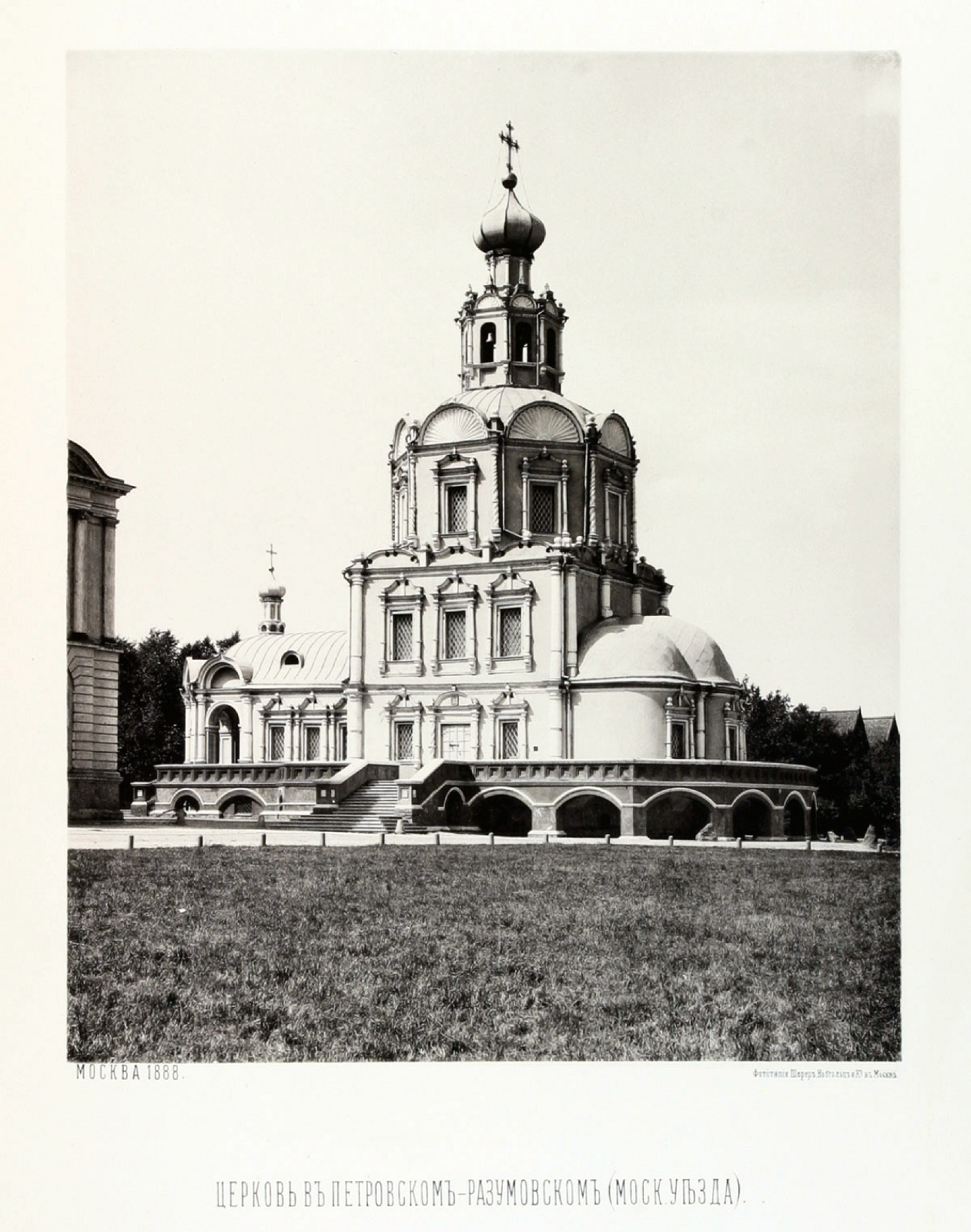
The Church in Petrovsko-Razumovskoe

Octagon on cube (also octagon on the quadrangle) is a type of architectural composition in which a building is designed so as the upper octagon-shaped part is placed on the lower cube-shaped part. This composition has been mainly used to design Russian Orthodox churches.

== History ==
Initially, this architectural solution became widespread in Russian wooden church architecture. At the end of the 17th century, the style firmly established itself among architects of the Moscow Baroque. The combination of contrasting forms of this type of church gives striving upward look as dynamism is a characteristic of the Baroque style. Octagon-on-cube churches continued to be built in Russian provinces until the end of the 18th century.

== Evolution of Moscow Baroque ==
With regard to the Moscow Baroque, there are several different types of octagon-on-cube churches. The main one is a stand-alone, multi-level church, built mainly by the Russian nobility for their suburban estates. The essential attribute of these buildings is a combination of church and bell tower in a single composition. Directly over the octagon level was arranged an open level with eight bells. This type of churches are the starting point for all other versions of the composition.

== See also ==
- Naryshkin Baroque
- Octagon house
- Russian church architecture
