= Church of the Intercession at Fili =

Church in Moscow, Russia

Coordinates: 55°45′2″N 37°30′36″E

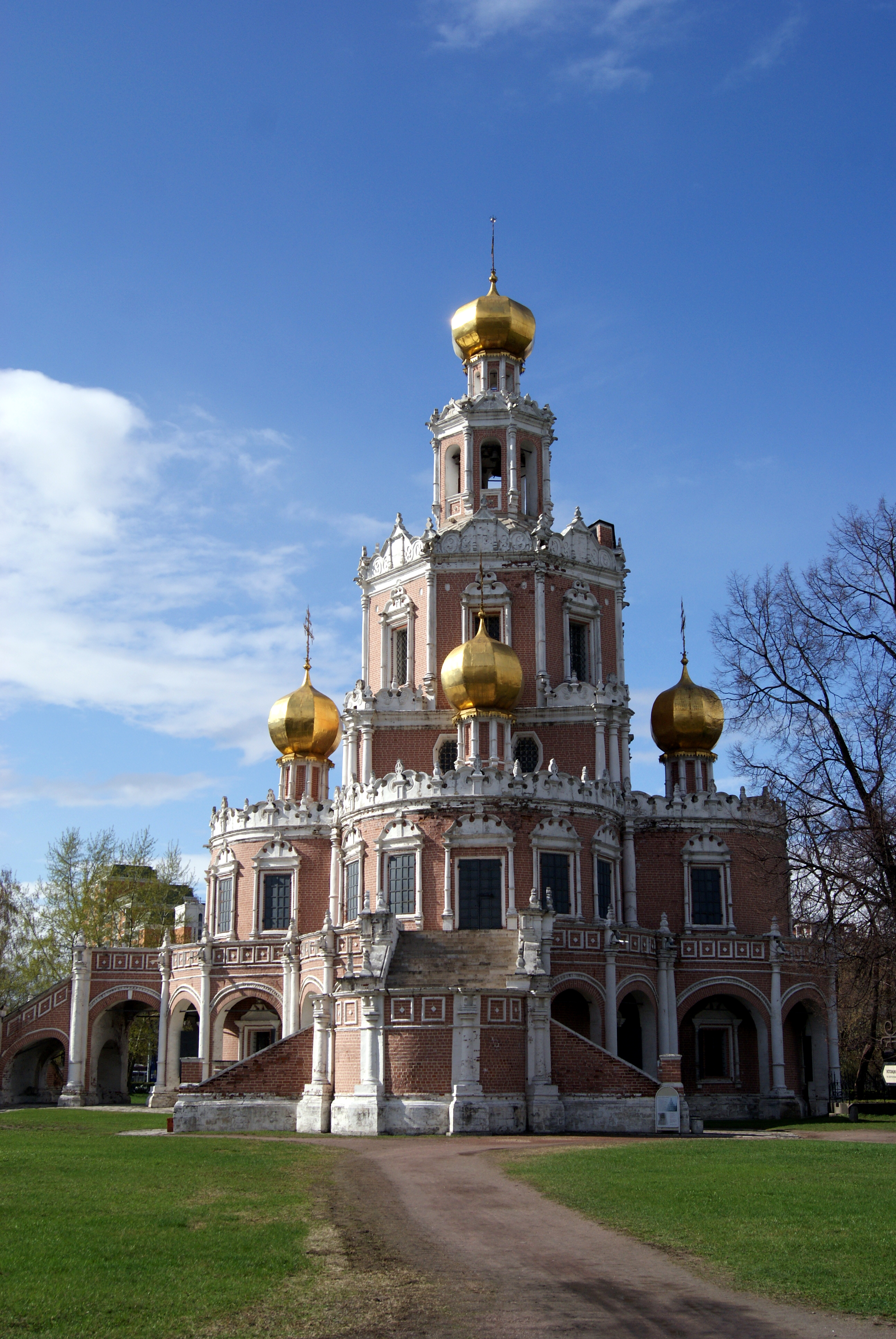
- Church of the Intercession
- Interactive map of the Church of the Intercession at Fili area

General information
- Architectural style: Naryshkin Baroque
- Location: Moscow, Russia
- Construction started: 1689 or later
- Completed: 1694
- Client: Lev Kirillovich Naryshkin

Technical details
- Structural system: Masonry

The Church of the Intercession at Fili (Russian: Це́рковь Покрова́ в Филя́х) is a Naryshkin baroque church commissioned by the boyar Lev Naryshkin in his suburban estate Fili; the territory has belonged to City of Moscow since 1935. It is located at 6, Novozavodskaya Street (near Bolshaya Filyovskaya Street).

The existing church replaced a 1619 wooden church established by Mikhail Romanov, consecrated in the name of the Intercession of the Virgin to commemorate the victory over Polish troops on that day in 1618. In 1689, Fili village was acquired by Lev Naryshkin, brother of Natalia Naryshkina and uncle of Peter I. Naryshkin's two brothers were murdered during the Moscow Uprising of 1682; it is believed that Natalia saved Lev from the same fate and that Lev Naryshkin vowed to dedicate the church to his late brothers.

The church was constructed between 1689 and 1694 in the shape of a Greek cross, with short, rounded annexes. It actually contains two churches: a winter Intercession Church in the basement and a summer, unheated Church of the Saviour Not Made by Hands above it. All construction records were lost in a 1712 fire, thus the exact year of completion is unknown, as well as the names of the architect and contractors (with an exception of icon painters Karp Zolotaryov and Kirill Ulanov). Both Natalia and Peter were frequent guests in Fili and donated money to the church; in the 18th century, it was equipped with a clock taken from Narva.

The church was damaged by French troops in 1812 and even more by the Bolsheviks and World War II. By 1945, it lost all domes, crosses and the upper octagonal layer; the interior had been looted earlier, in 1922. It was restored in 1955-1971 (exterior) and 1971-1980 (interiors) and painted pale red, although the original color scheme remains disputed. The earliest layer of paint uncovered by restoration is pale blue; later layers are either yellow or red.
