= Archaeoacoustics =

Study of sound and its relation to ancient things

Archaeoacoustics is a sub-field of archaeology and acoustics which studies the relationship between people and sound throughout history. It is an interdisciplinary field with methodological contributions from room acoustics, archaeology, and computer simulation, and is broadly related to topics within cultural anthropology such as experimental archaeology and ethnomusicology. Since many cultures have sonic components, applying acoustical methods to the study of archaeological sites and artifacts may reveal new information on the civilizations examined. This is especially relevant for public gatherings like rituals or ceremonies, where understanding how sound traveled was essential. Different acoustic methods have been applied to archaeological sites, revealing details about architectural features and the spatial organization of past civilizations.

== Disciplinary methodology ==
As the study of archaeoacoustics is concerned with a variety of cultural phenomena, the methodologies depend on the subject of inquiry. The majority of archaeoacoustic studies can be grouped into either a study of artefacts (like musical instruments) or places (buildings or sites).

For archaeological or historical sites that still exist in the present day, measurement methods from the realm of architectural acoustics may be used to characterise the behaviour of the site's acoustic field. When sites have been altered from their original state, a mixed-methodology approach may be used where acoustic measurements are combined with virtual reconstructions and simulations. The output of these simulations may be used to listen to the historical state of the site (via Auralization), to aide in an analysis based in the principles of psychoacoustic and for societal contextualization when historically relevant sources are taken into consideration.

For archaeological objects, acoustic measurements and simulations may be used to investigate the possible acoustic behaviour of artifacts found at a site, as in the case of an acoustic jar. In a similar vein, the relationship between cultural uses of a space and artifacts found within it can be examined experimentally, as with lithophones and ringing rocks.

== Notable applications ==
=== Natural formations ===
Iegor Reznikoff and Michel Dauvois studied the prehistoric painted caves of France, and found links between the artworks' positioning and acoustic effects. An AHRC project headed by Rupert Till of Huddersfield University, Chris Scarre of Durham University, and Bruno Fazenda of Salford University studies similar relationships in the prehistoric painted caves in northern Spain.

More recently, archaeologists Margarita Díaz-Andreu, Carlos García Benito and Tommaso Mattioli have undertaken work on rock art landscapes in Italy, France and Spain, paying particular attention to echolocation and augmented audibility of distant sounds that is experienced in some rock art sites.

Steven Waller has also studied the links between rock art and sound. His research is centred around whether the echoes within caves influenced or inspired cave paintings.

=== Structures and buildings ===
==== Stonehenge ====
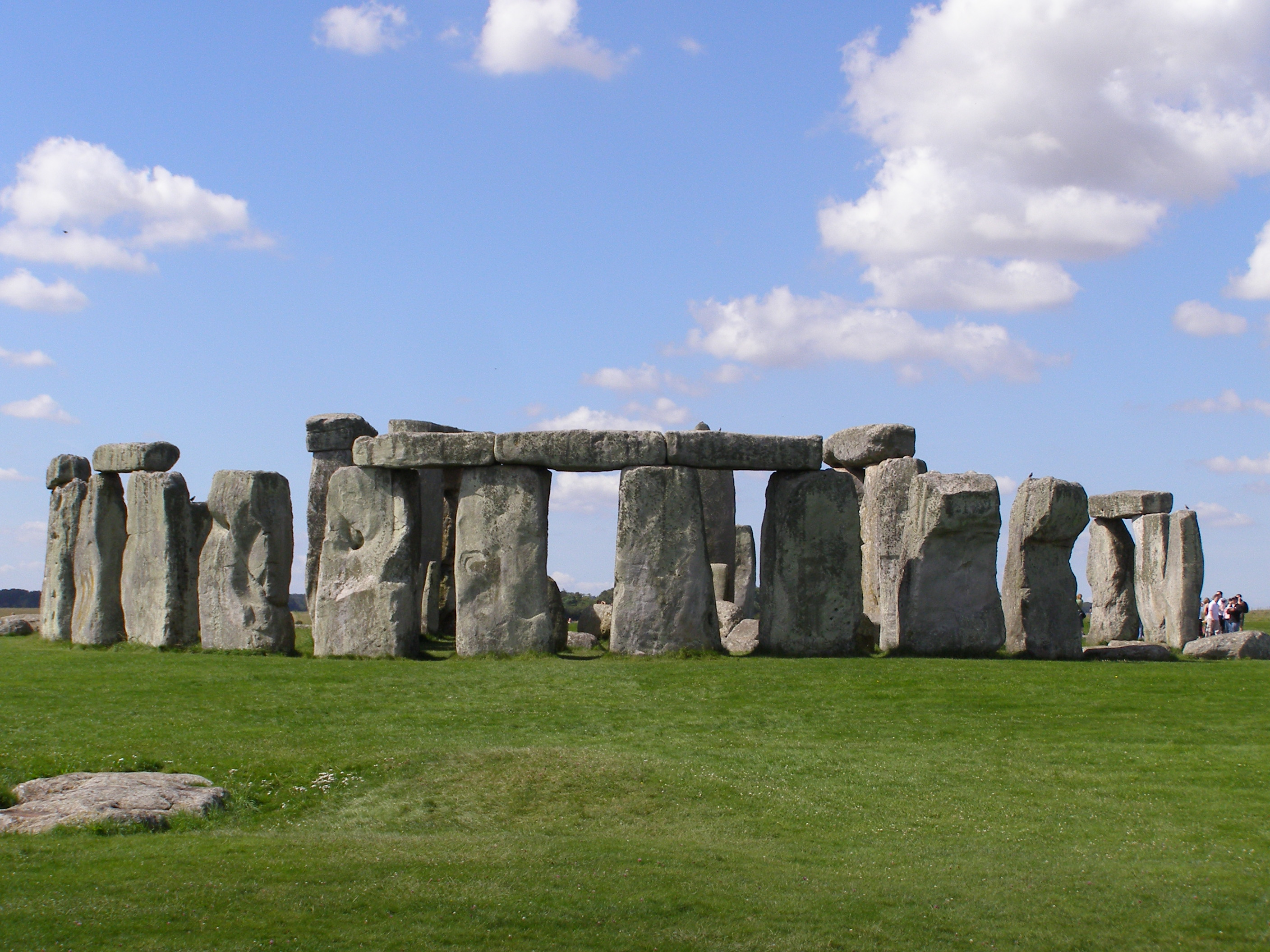
Stonehenge in 2007.

In 1999, Aaron Watson undertook work on the acoustics of numerous archaeological sites, including that of Stonehenge, and investigated numerous chamber tombs and other stone circles. Rupert Till (Huddersfield) and Bruno Fazenda (Salford) also explored Stonehenge's acoustics. At a 2011 conference, Steven Waller argued that acoustics interference patterns were used to design the blueprint of Stonehenge. Almost a decade later, in a detailed study described in a 2020 journal article of the Journal of Archaeological Science, a team led by Trevor Cox and Bruno Fazenda (Salford) employed an acoustic scale model reconstruction of Stonehenge to examine the acoustics within and around the site at different historical stages of the monument, applying sophisticated architectural acoustics methods and knowledge to studies on prehistoric archaeology, offering novel insight into how speech and musical sounds were altered by the acoustics of Stonehenge.

==== Chavín de Huantar ====
Miriam Kolar and colleagues (Stanford) studied various spatial and perceptual attributes of Chavín de Huantar. They identified within the site held the same resonance produced by pututu shells (also used as instruments in the Chavín culture).

==== Chichen Itza ====
Chichen Itza in 2009.

A handclap made near the foot of El Castillo returns as a brief descending frequency sweep, commonly compared with the call of the resplendent quetzal. The regularly stepped staircase has been modelled as an acoustic diffraction grating, with the detailed response depending partly on the spectral content of the initiating sound. Lubman speculated that the staircase had been deliberately designed to produce an echo resembling the quetzal's call, while later research noted that both accidental and intentional explanations had been proposed.

==== Hagia Sophia and the Church of the Acheiropoietos ====
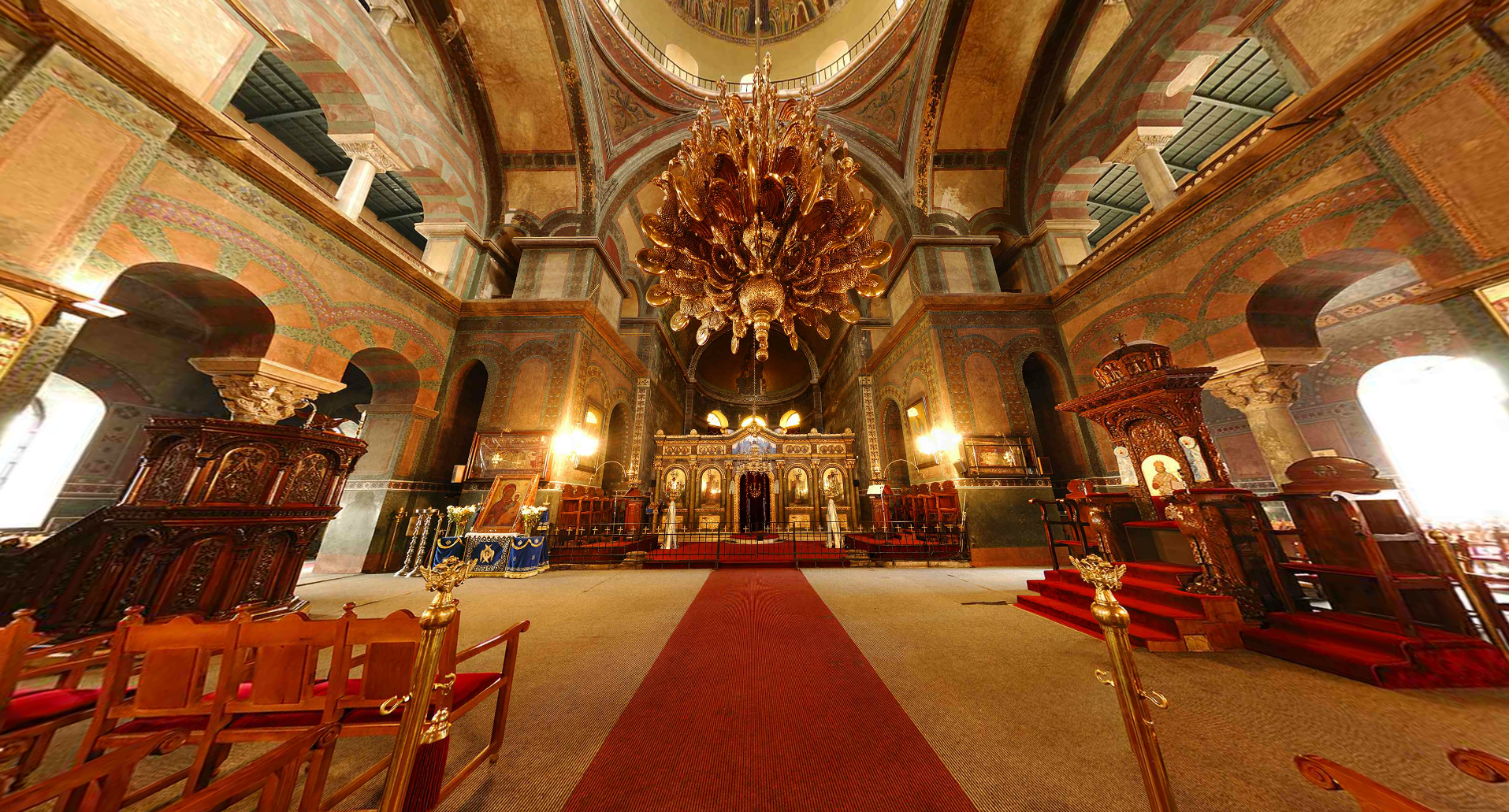
Interior of Hagia Sophia, Thessaloniki.

In 2014, an international team of researchers measured the acoustic properties of eight Byzantine churches in Thessaloniki. A subsequent study focused on Hagia Sophia and the Church of the Acheiropoietos, examining how spoken and chanted sound was produced and received in relation to the churches' architecture, furnishings, decoration, liturgy, music, acoustics, and psychoacoustics. The study also considered connections between the two churches and the streets that linked them.

=== Artifacts ===
Archaeologist Paul Devereux's work (2001) has looked at ringing rocks, Avebury and various other subjects, that he details in his book Stone Age Soundtracks.

Ian Cross of University of Cambridge has explored lithoacoustics, the use of stones as musical instruments.

Archaeologist Cornelia Kleinitz has studied the sound of a rock gongs in Sudan with Rupert Till and Brenda Baker.

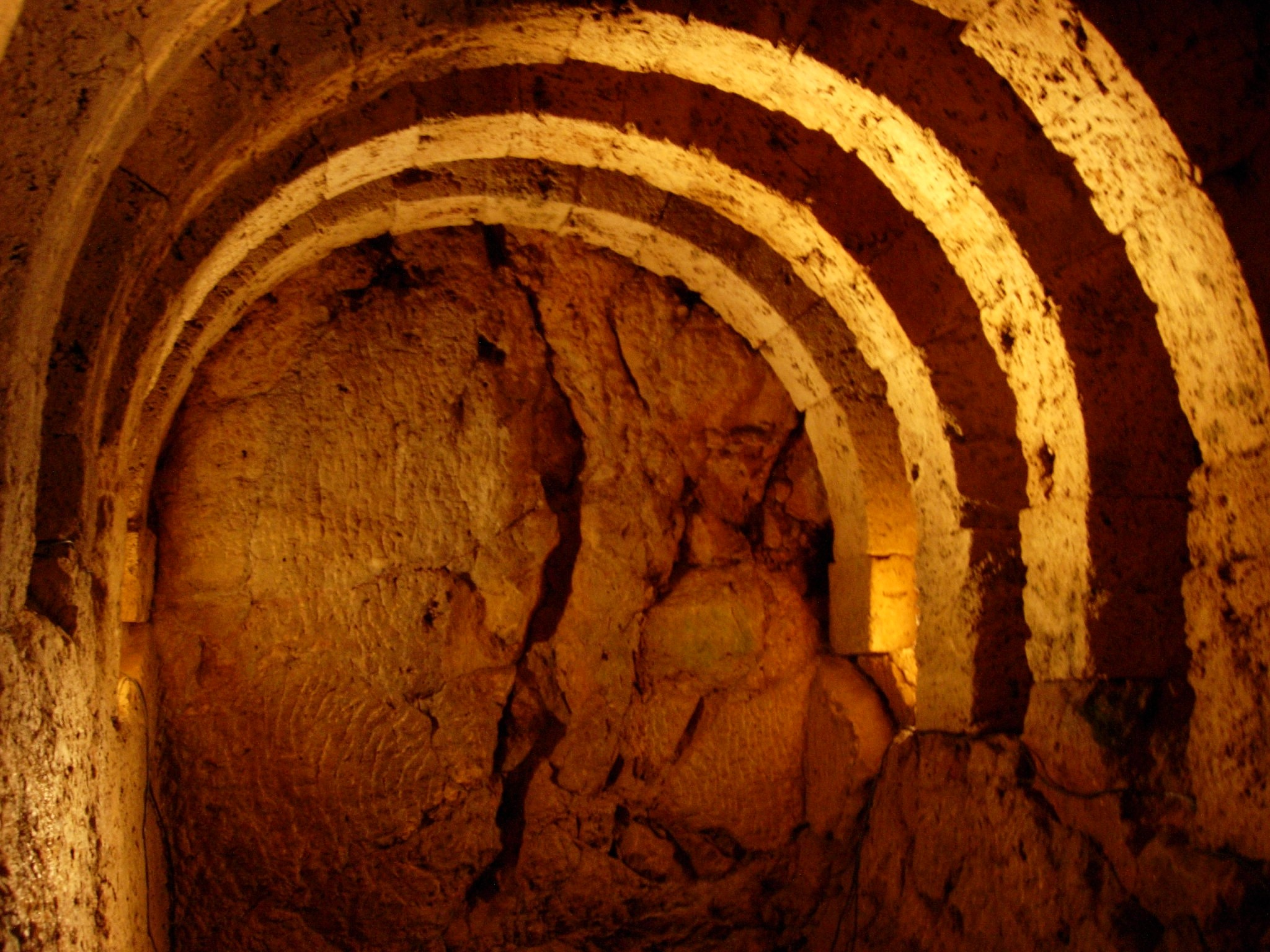
Basement of Necromanteion of Acheron in 2005.

Panagiotis Karampatzakis and Vasilios Zafranas investigated the acoustic properties of the Necromanteion of Acheron, Aristoxenus acoustic vases, and the evolution of acoustics in the ancient Greek and Roman odea.

== Study groups ==
The activity of research groups in the field of archaeoacoustics (sometimes called "acoustic heritage") and the related field of music archaeology is determined by the availability of funding, though some groups maintain a long term presence in the field. In the past twenty years, many researchers have undertaken both seminal work in developing methods to identify, conserve, or recreate aspects of historical acoustic environments, as well as case studies at relevant heritage sites.

The Acoustics and Music of British Prehistory Research Network was funded by the Arts and Humanities Research Council and Engineering and Physical Sciences Research Council, led by Rupert Till and Chris Scarre, as well as Professor Jian Kang of Sheffield University's Department of Architecture. It has a list of researchers working in the field, and links to many other relevant sites. An e-mail list has been discussing the subject since 2002 and was set up as a result of the First Pan-American/Iberian Meeting on Acoustics by Victor Reijs.

Based in the US, the OTS Foundation has conducted several international conferences specifically on archaeoacoustics, with a focus on the human experience of sound in ancient ritual and ceremonial spaces. The published papers represent a broader multidisciplinary study and include input from the realms of archaeology, architecture, acoustic engineering, rock art, and psycho-acoustics, as well as reports of field work from Gobekli Tepe and Southern Turkey, Malta, and elsewhere around the world.

The European Music Archeology Project is a multi-million euro project to recreate ancient instruments and their sounds, and also the environments in which they would have been played.

== Discredited theories ==
Prior to the establishment of archaeoacoustics as a formal area of study, the possibility of unintentionally recorded sound contained in ancient artifacts held great interest for some theorists. Phonograph cylinders store sound as engravings in the surface of the cylinder, which can be played back by a phonograph with the proper settings. It was hypothesized that this process could have been accidentally replicated during the creation of a ceramic pot or vase, and that such artifacts could be sonified to recover the sounds contained within the elastic medium.

In 1902, Charles Sanders Peirce expressed this idea when he wrote: "Give science only a hundred more centuries of increase in geometrical progression, and she may be expected to find that the sound waves of Aristotle's voice have somehow recorded themselves." The concept continued to be of interest throughout the second half of the century, with David E. H. Jones discussing the subject in his "Daedalus" column in the 6 February 1969 issue of New Scientist magazine, writing:

[A] trowel, like any flat plate, must vibrate in response to sound: thus, drawn over the wet surface by the singing plasterer, it must emboss a gramophone-type recording of his song in the plaster. Once the surface is dry, it may be played back.

— Jones, 1982

Jones subsequently received a letter from Richard G. Woodbridge III, claiming to have already been working on the idea and stating that he had sent a paper on the subject to the journal Nature. The paper never appeared in Nature, but the Proceedings of the IEEE printed a letter from Woodbridge entitled "Acoustic Recordings from Antiquity" in its August 1969 edition. In this letter, the author called attention to what he called "Acoustic Archaeology" and described some early experiments in the field. He then described his experiments with making clay pots and oil paintings from which sound could then be replayed, using a conventional record player cartridge connected directly to a set of headphones. He claimed to have extracted the hum of the potter's wheel from the grooves of a pot, and the word "blue" from an analysis of patch of blue colour in a painting.

In 1993, the idea was furthered explored by archeology professor Paul Åström and acoustics professor Mendel Kleiner who reported that they could recover some sounds from pottery, mainly in the upper frequencies.

As discussed in an episode of MythBusters (Episode 62: Killer Cable Snaps, Pottery Record) while some generic acoustic phenomena can be found on pottery, it is unlikely that any discernible sounds (like someone talking) could be recorded on the pots, unless ancient people had the technical knowledge to deliberately put the sounds on the artifacts.

== In popular culture ==
- A 1955 episode of the syndicated U.S. TV series Science Fiction Theatre, called "The Frozen Sound", involves a stone of hardened lava, long kept as a paperweight, that turns out to have recorded the voices of a panicking crowd in Pompeii almost 2000 years before.
- Nigel Kneale's 1972 BBC television play The Stone Tape helped to popularize the term 'stone tape theory'.
- Arthur C. Clarke discussed the idea at a NASA conference on the future of technology in the early 1970s.
- An episode of Mysteryquest on History called Stonehenge featured Rupert Till and Bruno Fazenda conducting acoustic tests at Stonehenge and at the Maryhill Monument, a full-sized replica of Stonehenge in the USA.
- Gregory Benford's 1979 short story "Time Shards" concerns a researcher who recovers thousand-year-old sound from a piece of pottery thrown on a wheel and inscribed with a fine wire as it spun. The sound is then analyzed to reveal conversations between the potter and his assistant in Middle English.
- Rudy Rucker's 1981 short story "Buzz" includes a small section of audio recovered from ancient Egyptian pottery.
- A 2000 episode of The X-Files, "Hollywood A.D.", features "The Lazarus Bowl", a mythical piece of pottery reputed to have recorded on it the words that Jesus Christ spoke when he raised Lazarus from the dead.
- In the 1996 game Amber: Journeys Beyond, this phenomenon is referred to as 'stone tape theory' and a key part of the game's plot.
- CSI: Crime Scene Investigation used this in 2005 episode "Committed", where an inmate's conversation is partially recorded on a clay jar.
- In the first-season episode of Fringe entitled "The Road Not Taken", an electron microscope is used to reproduce sounds captured on a partially melted window.
- In Jurassic Park III, a 3D printed larynx replica is used to communicate with velociraptors.

== See also ==
- International Study Group on Music Archaeology
- Music archaeology
- Ancient music
- Prehistoric music
- Ernst Chladni
- Phonautograph
- Echolocation
- Room acoustics and Architectural acoustics
