= List of manias =

The English suffix -mania denotes an obsession with something; a mania. The suffix is used in some medical terms denoting mental disorders. It has also entered standard English and is affixed to many different words to denote enthusiasm or obsession with that subject. Cambridge Dictionary has defined mania as “a very strong interest in something that fills a person's mind or uses up all their time” Britannica Dictionary defined mania as a mental illness in which a person becomes very emotional or excited.

== Psychological conditions ==
=== A ===
- Aboulomania – indecisiveness (aboulo- (Greek) meaning irresolution or indecision)
- Andromania – human sexual behaviour and desire towards males in females (andro- (Greek) meaning man, men, male or masculine) Can be replaced by hypersexuality, nymphomania, cytheromania, hysteromania or aphrodisiomania.
- Anglomania – England and a passion or obsession with the English (i.e. anglophile) See also anglophobia.
- Arithmomania, arithmomania – numbers and counting (arithmo- (Greek) meaning number)
- Ablutomania - Mania for washing oneself
- Agromania - Intense desire to be in open spaces
- Anthomania - Obsession with flowers

=== B ===
- Bibliomania – books and reading (biblio- (Greek) meaning books)

=== C ===
- Choreomania, choromania – dancing (choreo- (Greek) meaning dance)

=== D ===
- Demonomania – one's own demonic possession (delusional conviction)
- Dermatillomania – picking at the skin
- Dipsomania – alcohol (dipso- (Greek) meaning thirst)
- Drapetomania – running away from home (pseudoscience)
- Dromomania – traveling

=== E ===
- Egomania – obsession with oneself and self-worship (ego- (Latin) meaning I, first person and singular pronoun)
- Ergomania, ergasiomania – work (ergasio- or ergo- (Greek) meaning work)
- Erotomania – sexual desire or sexual attraction from strangers (delusional conviction) (eroto- (Greek) meaning sexual passion or desire)
- Etheromania – addiction to diethyl ether (ethero- (Greek > Latin) meaning upper air or sky)
- Eleutheromania – an intense and irresistible desire for freedom

=== G ===
- Graphomania – writing or making lists (grapho- (Greek) meaning to write)
- Gigantomania - is the production of unusually and superfluously large works.

=== H ===
- Hypermania – severe mania—mental state with high intensity disorientation and often violent behavior, symptomatic of bipolar disorder (hyper- (Greek) meaning abnormal excess)
- Hypomania – mild mania—mental state with persistent and pervasive elevated or irritable mood, symptomatic of bipolar disorder (hypo- (Greek) meaning deficient)

=== K ===
- Kleptomania, klopemania – urge to steal
- Klazomania – screaming

=== L ===
- Logomania – being wordy and talkative i.e. loquacity
- Ludomania – gambling

=== M ===
- Mania – severely elevated mood
- Megalomania – wealth and power
- Micromania – self-deprecation
- Monomania – a single object, type of object, or concept
- Mythomania – compulsive lying
- Melomania – excessive or abnormal love of music

=== N ===
- Nymphomania – an obsolete term for female hypersexuality

=== O ===
- Oniomania – desire to shop
- Onychotillomania – picking at the fingernails

=== P ===
- Plutomania – greed/obsession with money or wealth (ploutos- (Greek) meaning wealth)
- Politicomania - obsession with politics
- Pteridomania – ferns
- Pyromania – fire or starting fires

=== R ===
- Rhinotillexomania – nose picking (rhino- (Greek) meaning nose and tillexis- meaning to pluck, tear, pull or pick at)

=== S ===
- Satyromania – excessive, often uncontrollable sexual desire in and behavior by a man (satyr- (Greek > Latin) meaning a woodland deity, part man and part goat; riotous merriment and lechery)

=== T ===
- Theomania – one's own divinity or one's divine mission
- Toxicomania – poisons
- Trichotillomania – pulling out one's hair
- Typomania – printing one's works

== Pop culture and celebrities ==
The -mania suffix is also used to describe immense appreciations, fandoms and trends that are not necessarily psychological, including popular culture and politics.

- Balloonomania – 18th and 19th century interest in hot-air balloons
- Bartmania – American television series The Simpsons (particularly character Bart Simpson), early 1990s
- Beatlemania – English band the Beatles, 1960s
- Dalekmania – Dalek characters from Doctor Who, c. 1965
- Dianamania – Diana, Princess of Wales, 1980s and 1990s
- Jacksonmania – Michael Jackson and The Jackson 5
- Leo-mania – American actor Leonardo DiCaprio, late 1990s
- Lisztomania – Hungarian composer Franz Liszt, 1840s
- Littlermania - British darts player Luke Littler, and the sport overall, from 2024
- Madonnamania - American singer Madonna, from c. 1985
- Mansell-mania – British racing driver Nigel Mansell, 1980s–1995
- Orchidelirium, also known as orchidomania – orchids in the Victorian period
- Pineapple mania – early 18th century to mid-to-late-19th century fascination with pineapples
- Pokémania - Video game franchise Pokémon, c. 1999 to 2000
- Sinatramania – American singer Frank Sinatra, mid-1940s
- Swiftmania – American singer Taylor Swift, 2020s

== Politics and economics ==
- Corbynmania – British Labour party leader Jeremy Corbyn (2015 to 2020)
- Jacindamania – New Zealand prime minister Jacinda Ardern (2017 to 2023)
- Obama-mania – United States president and senator Barack Obama, late 2000s and early 2010s
- Railway Mania – Stock market bubble in the railway industry in the United Kingdom of Great Britain and Ireland, 1840s
- Trudeaumania – the Canadian politician Pierre Trudeau
- Tulipomania – a metaphor for an economic bubble

== See also ==
- List of phobias
