= Prehistoric music =

Music produced in preliterate cultures (prehistory)

Prehistoric music (previously called primitive music) is a term in the history of music for all music produced in preliterate cultures (prehistory), beginning somewhere in very late geological history. Prehistoric music is followed by ancient music in different parts of the world, but still exists in isolated areas. However, it is more common to refer to the "prehistoric" music which still survives as folk, indigenous or traditional music. Prehistoric music is studied alongside other periods within music archaeology.

Findings from Paleolithic archaeology sites suggest that prehistoric people used carving and piercing tools to create instruments. Archeologists have found Paleolithic flutes carved from bones in which lateral holes have been pierced. The disputed Divje Babe flute, a perforated cave bear femur, is at least 40,000 years old. Instruments such as the seven-holed flute and various types of stringed instruments, such as the Ravanahatha, have been recovered from the Indus Valley civilization archaeological sites.

== Origins of prehistoric instruments ==
Many languages traditionally have terms for music that include dance, religion, or cult. The context in which prehistoric music took place has also become a subject of study and debate, as the sound made by music in prehistory would have been somewhat different depending on the acoustics present. Some cultures include sound mimesis within their music; often, this feature is related to shamanistic beliefs or practice. It may also serve entertainment or practical functions, for example in hunting scenarios.

It is likely that the first musical instrument was the human voice itself, which can make a vast array of sounds, from singing, humming and whistling through to clicking, coughing and yawning. The oldest known Neanderthal hyoid bone with the modern human form has been dated to be 60,000 years old, predating the oldest known Paleolithic bone flute by some 20,000 years, but the true chronology may date back much further.

Theoretically, music may have existed prior to the Paleolithic era. Anthropological and archaeological research suggest that music first arose when stone tools first began to be used by hominins. The noises produced by work, such as pounding seed and roots into a meal, are a likely source of rhythm created by early humans. The first rhythm instruments or percussion instruments most likely involved the clapping of hands, stones hit together, or other things that are useful to create rhythm. There are bone flutes and pipes which are unambiguously Paleolithic. Additionally, pierced phalanges (usually interpreted as "phalangeal whistles"), bullroarers, and rasps have also been discovered. The latter musical finds date back as far as the Paleolithic era, although there is some ambiguity over archaeological finds which can be variously interpreted as either musical or non-musical instruments/tools.

Another possible origin of music is motherese, the vocal-gestural communication between mothers and infants. This form of communication involves melodic, rhythmic and movement patterns as well as the communication of intention and meaning, and in this sense is similar to music.

Geoffrey Miller suggests musical displays play a role in "demonstrating fitness to mate." Based on the ideas of honest signal and the handicap principle, Miller suggested that music and dancing, as energetically costly activities, demonstrated the physical and psychological prowess of the singing and dancing individual. Similarly, communal singing occurs among both sexes in cooperatively breeding songbirds of Australia and Africa, such as magpies and white-browed sparrow-weavers.

== Archaeoacoustic methodology ==
The field of archaeoacoustics uses acoustic techniques to explore prehistoric sounds, soundscapes, and instruments; it has included the study of ringing rocks and lithophones, of the acoustics of ritual sites such as chamber tombs and stone circles, and the exploration of prehistoric instruments using acoustic testing. Such work has included acoustic field tests to capture and analyze the impulse response of archaeological sites; acoustic tests of lithophones or 'rock gongs'; and reconstructions of soundscapes as experimental archaeology.

== Africa ==
=== Egypt ===
In prehistoric Egypt, music and chanting were commonly used in magic and rituals. The ancient Egyptians credited the goddess Bat with the invention of music. The cult of Bat was eventually syncretised into that of Hathor because both were depicted as cows. Hathor's music was believed to have been used by Osiris as part of his effort to civilise the world. The lion-goddess Bastet was also considered a goddess of music. Rhythms during this time were unvaried and music served to create rhythm. Small shells were used as whistles. During the predynastic period of Egyptian history, funerary chants continued to play an important role in Egyptian religion and were accompanied by clappers or a flute. Despite the lack of physical evidence in some cases, Egyptologists theorise that the development of certain instruments known of the Old Kingdom period, such as the end-blown flute, took place during this time.

=== Libya ===
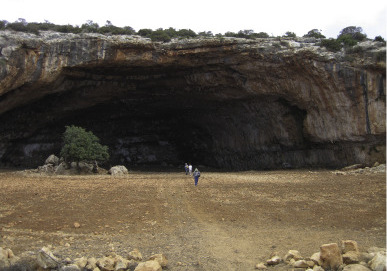
Entrance of Haua Fteah

Excavations in 1969 found a 90-115,000 year old bone flute fragment in the Haua Fteah cave in Libya. It has one manmade punctured hole, which resembles similar bone flutes found in Europe and the Mediterranean. The exact species the bone comes from is unknown, but it seems to have come from a large bird.

=== Southern Africa ===
The peoples of Southern Africa in South Africa, Zimbabwe and Zambia used bone, clay and metal for creating instruments, as idiophones and aerophones were the two types of instruments that were made. Spinning disks, bone tubes and a bullroarer were found in the Southern and Western Capes of South Africa that date back from 2525±85 BP - 1732 AD. There were also many more bone tubes found in the Matjies River which may have been used for flutes, trumpets, whistles, bells and mbira keys. Numerous mbira keys were found in Zimbabwe that date back to 210±90 BP - Later Iron Age.

== Asia ==
=== China ===
In 1986, several gudi (lit. 'bone flutes') were found in Jiahu in Henan Province, China. They date to about 7000 BCE. They have between six and nine holes each and were made from the hollow bones of the red-crowned crane. At the time of discovery, one was found to be still playable. This playable bone flute is capable of using both the five- or seven-note Xia Zhi scale and the six-note Qing Shang scale of the ancient Chinese musical system.

=== India ===
References to Indian classical music (marga) are found in the Vedas, ancient scriptures of the Hindu tradition. Instruments such as the seven-holed flute and various types of stringed instruments have been recovered from the Indus Valley Civilisation archaeological sites.

=== Palestine ===
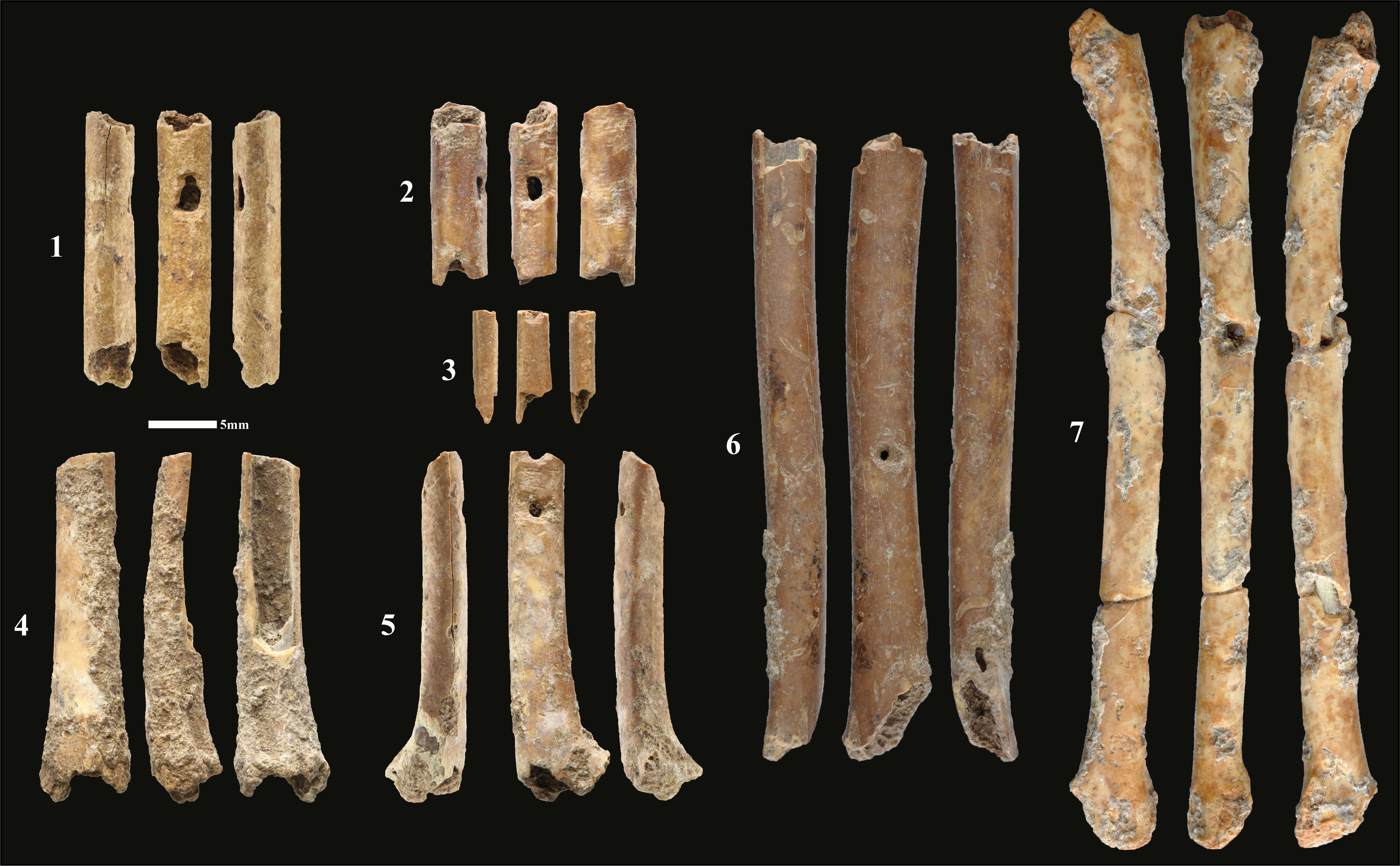
The 7 bone flutes found in Eynan-Mallaha

The peoples of Palestine had prehistoric bones that were specifically aerophones. Several of these bones were excavated at Eynan-Mallaha and date back to 10,730 and 9760 cal BC. Smaller bird bones were preferred to bigger ones due to the difference in sound, although they are more difficult to play as a result of their size. The pitch of the tone the flutes produce are believed to mimic the call of several birds. It is likely that the flute was used for music and dance rather than hunting, since it is limited by the small range of birds imitated. It is common for birds to be used as an inspiration for music such as the Sun Dance of the Plains Indians in which dancers used whistles to mimic eagles, or the Kaluli people who wore rainforest birds' feathers as ornaments.

=== Vietnam ===
Two deer antlers were discovered in the Go O Chua site of southern Vietnam which were used as stringed instruments, they are dated to be at minimum 2,000 years old. One discovered in 1997, and the other in 2008. The instrument has a single string which was attached on both ends of the antler, with the burr of the antler forming a bridge. The instrument is similar in form to a Đàn brố, or a K'ni. These are the first stringed instruments archaeologically discovered in Vietnam.

Several lithophones were also found across the country which would have been laid down on strings with wooden or bamboo frames and struck to make noise.

== Australia ==
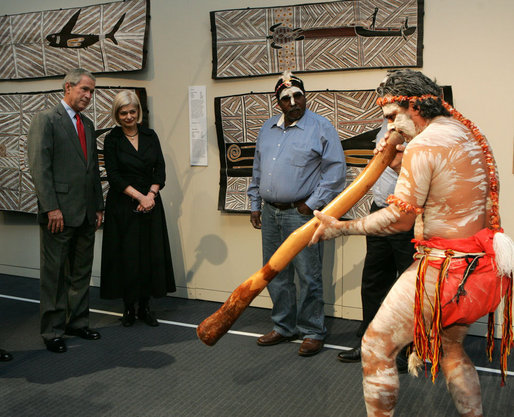
Performance of Aboriginal song and dance in the Australian National Maritime Museum in Sydney

Australian Aboriginal and Torres Strait Islander music includes the music of Aboriginal Australians and Torres Strait Islanders. Music has formed an integral part of the social, cultural and ceremonial observances of these people, down through the millennia of their individual and collective histories to the present day, and has existed for 40,000 years. The traditional forms include many aspects of performance and musical instrumentation which are unique to particular regions or Indigenous Australian groups; there are equally elements of musical tradition which are common or widespread through much of the Australian continent, and even beyond. The culture of the Torres Strait Islanders is related to that of adjacent parts of New Guinea and so their music is also related. Music is a vital part of Indigenous Australians' cultural maintenance.

=== Traditional instruments ===
==== Didgeridoo ====
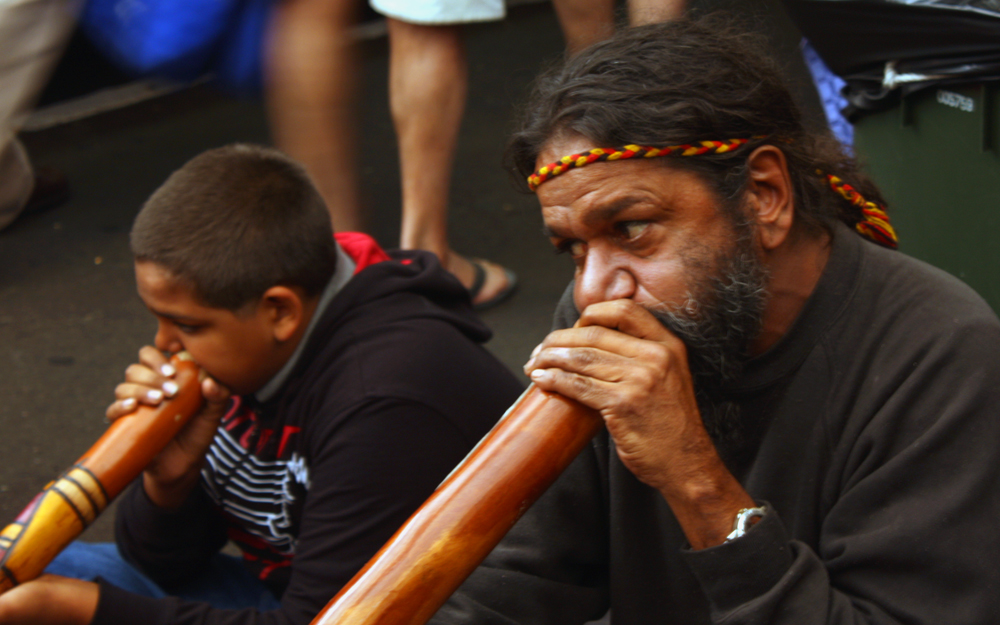
Buskers playing didgeridoos at Fremantle Markets, 2009

A didgeridoo is a type of musical instrument that, according to western musicological classification, falls into the category of aerophone. It is one of the oldest instruments to date. It consists of a long tube, without finger holes, through which the player blows. It is sometimes fitted with a mouthpiece of beeswax. Didgeridoos are traditionally made of eucalyptus, but contemporary materials such as PVC piping are used. In traditional situations it is played only by men, usually as an accompaniment to ceremonial or recreational singing, or, much more rarely, as a solo instrument. Skilled players use the technique of circular breathing to achieve a continuous sound, and also employ techniques for inducing multiple harmonic resonances. Traditionally the instrument was not widespread around the country, but was only used by Aboriginal groups in the most northerly areas.

==== Clapsticks ====
A clapstick is a type of musical instrument that, according to western musicological classification, falls into the category of percussion. Unlike drumsticks, which are generally used to strike a drum, clapsticks are intended for striking one stick on another, and people as well. They are of oval shape with paintings of snakes, lizards, birds and more.

==== Gum leaf ====
Used as a hand-held free reed instrument.

==== Bullroarer ====
A bullroarer consists of a weighted airfoil (a rectangular thin slat of wood about 15 cm (6 in) to 60 cm (24 in) long and about 1.25 cm (0.5 in) to 5 cm (2 in) wide) attached to a long cord. Typically, the wooden slat is trimmed down to a sharp edge around the edges, and serrations along the length of the wooden slat may or may not be used, depending on the cultural traditions of the region in question.

The cord is given a slight initial twist, and the roarer is then swung in a large circle in a horizontal plane, or in a smaller circle in a vertical plane. The aerodynamics of the roarer will keep it spinning about its axis even after the initial twist has unwound. The cord winds fully first in one direction and then the other, alternating.

It makes a characteristic roaring vibrato sound with notable sound modulations occurring from the rotation of the roarer along its longitudinal axis, and the choice of whether a shorter or longer length of cord is used to spin the bullroarer. By modifying the expansiveness of its circuit and the speed given it, and by changing the plane in which the bullroarer is whirled from horizontal to vertical or vice versa, the modulation of the sound produced can be controlled, making the coding of information possible.

- Audio/visual demonstration
- Sound modulation by changing orbital plane.

The low-frequency component of the sound travels extremely long distances, clearly audible over many miles on a quiet night.

The use of bullroarers has also been documented in ancient Greece, Britain, Ireland, Scandinavia, Mali, New Zealand, and the Americas (see Bullroarer). Banks Island Eskimos were still using bullroarers circa 1963 (59-year-old "Susie" being documented scaring off four polar bears armed with only three seal hooks and vocals. Aleut, Eskimo and Inuit used bullroarers occasionally as a children's toy or musical instruments, but preferred drums and rattles.

== Europe ==
=== Austria and Hungary ===
Clay bells were found in Austria and Hungary which date to the early Neolithic period. One is from the Starčevo site in Gellénháza, Hungary, and the other is from the Brunn site located on the outskirts of Vienna which was excavated in 1999. Unlike modern bells these bells lack a clapper. They were suspended by string and most likely struck with wooden sticks or animal bones. Both bells were recreated and played, but neither were loud enough to be used as instruments, which might be why they were destroyed and thrown away.

=== France ===
A one-of-a-kind Upper Paleolithic era Seashell Horn was discovered in the Marsoulas cave in 1931, which is made of a Charonia lampus shell. Dating back to the early Magdalenian period, it was modified to be played as a wind instrument by blowing air through the mouthpiece located at the apex. There are engravings on the inside of the lip, while unclear what the engravings represent, it is clear that they were intentional.

=== Germany ===
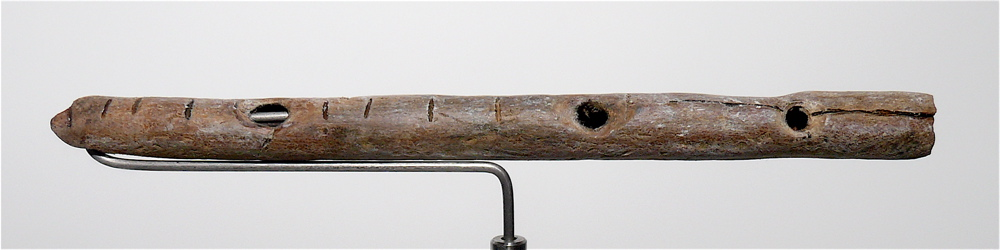
Aurignacian flute made from a vulture bone, Geissenklösterle (Swabia), which is about 35,000 years old

In 2008, archaeologists discovered a bone flute in the Hohle Fels cave near Ulm, Germany. The five-holed flute has a V-shaped mouthpiece and is made from a vulture wing bone. The researchers involved in the discovery officially published their findings in the journal Nature in June 2009. It is one of several similar instruments found in the area, which date to around 42,000 years ago, making this the oldest confirmed finds of any musical instruments in history. The Hohle Fels flute was found next to the Venus of Hohle Fels and a short distance from the oldest known human carving. On announcing the discovery, scientists suggested that the "finds demonstrate the presence of a well-established musical tradition at the time when modern humans colonized Europe". Scientists have also suggested that the discovery of the flute may help to explain why early humans survived, while Neanderthals became extinct.

=== Greece ===
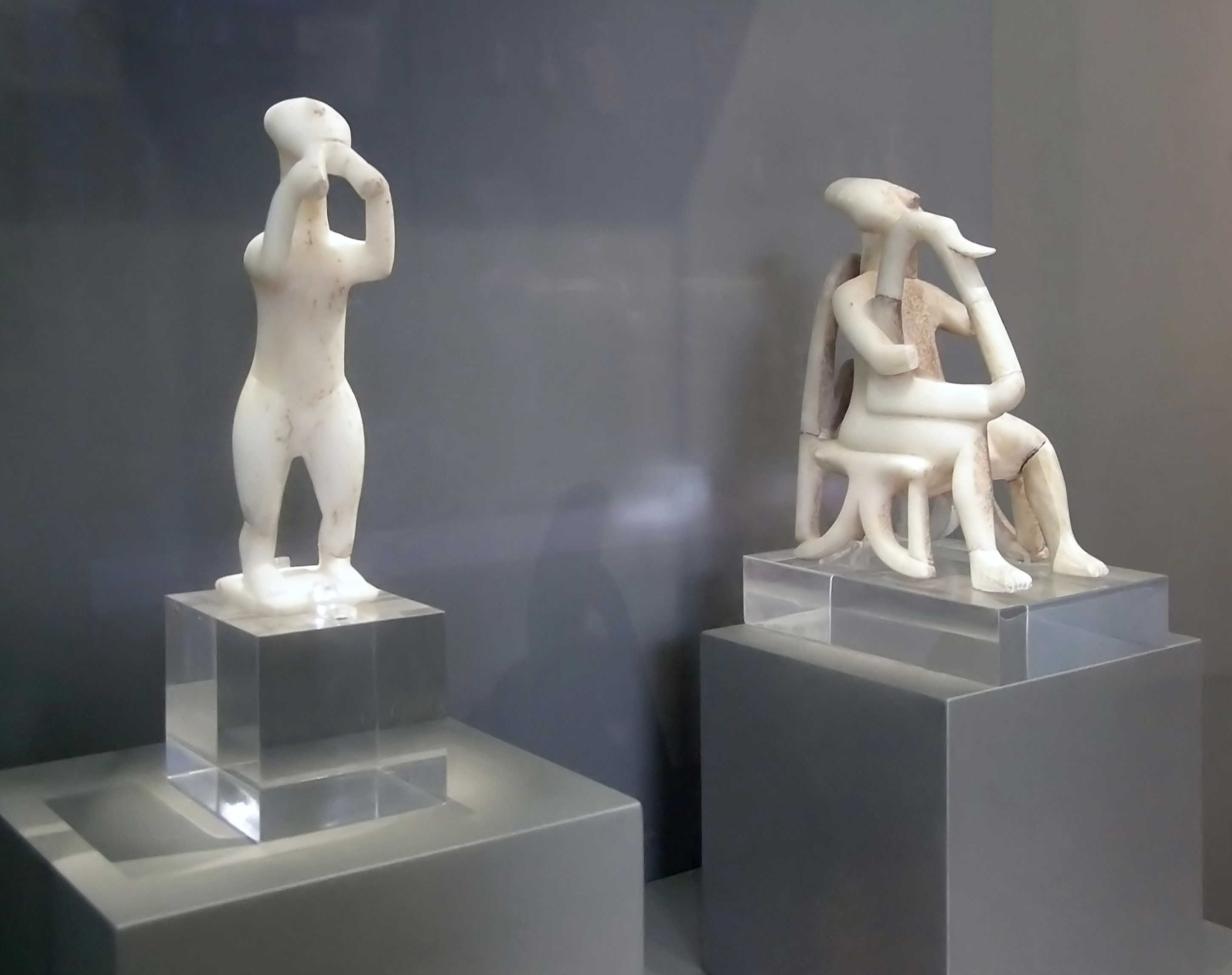
Cycladic statues of a double flute player (foreground) and a harpist (background)

On the island of Keros (Κέρος), two marble statues from the late Neolithic culture called Early Cycladic culture (2900–2000 BCE) were discovered together in a single grave in the 19th century. They depict a standing double flute player and a sitting musician playing a triangular-shaped lyre or harp. The harpist is approximately 23 cm (9 in) high and dates to around 2700–2500 BCE. He expresses concentration and intense feelings and tilts his head up to the light. The meaning of these and many other figures is not known; perhaps they were used to ward off evil spirits, had religious significance, served as toys, or depicted figures from mythology.

=== Ireland ===
The oldest known wooden pipes were discovered in Wicklow, Ireland, in the winter of 2003, carbon-dated at around 2167±30 BCE. A wood-lined pit contained a group of six flutes made from yew wood, between 30 and 50 cm (12 and 20 in) long, tapered at one end, but without any finger holes. They may once have been strapped together.

=== Slovakia ===
A clay egg-shaped rattle, bottle-shaped rattles, and pan pipes made of bone were all discovered in Slovakia. They are dated back to 300-800 AD, during the Migration Period. Music culture in Slovakia had not formed until the 9th century while these instruments go back to 4-6th century AD, so while they cannot be connected to Slovak culture they prove that music had existed in this region at that time. They may have been used for ceremonies, rituals, or cults for dancing and singing to ward off evil spirits or call to the gods for help.

=== Slovenia ===
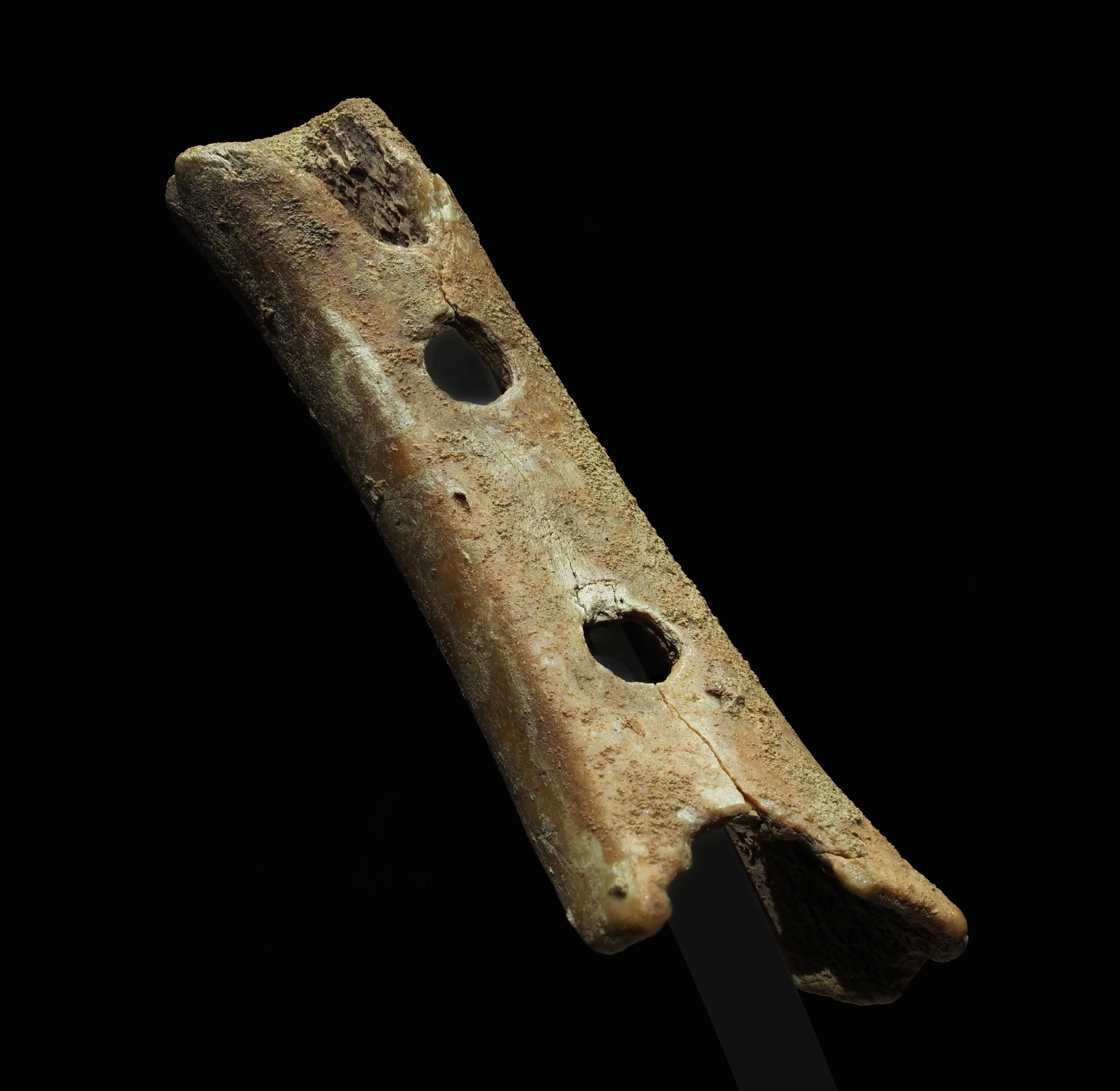
Divje Babe flute

The oldest flute ever discovered may be the so-called Divje Babe flute, found in the Cerkno Hills, Slovenia in 1995, though this is disputed. The item in question is a fragment of the femur of a juvenile cave bear, and has been dated to about 43,000 years ago. However, whether it is truly a musical instrument or simply a carnivore-chewed bone is a matter of ongoing debate. In 2012, some flutes that were discovered years earlier in the Geißenklösterle cave received a new high-resolution carbon-dating examination yielding an age of 42,000 to 43,000 years.

== The Americas ==
=== Canada ===
For thousands of years, Canada has been inhabited by Indigenous Peoples from a variety of different cultures and of several major linguistic groupings. Each of the Indigenous communities had (and have) their own unique musical traditions. Chanting – singing is widely popular, with many of its performers also using a variety of musical instruments. They used the materials at hand to make their instruments for thousands of years before Europeans immigrated to the New World. They made gourds and animal horns into rattles which were elaborately carved and beautifully painted. In woodland areas, they made horns of birchbark along with drumsticks of carved antlers and wood. Drums were generally made of carved wood and animal hides. These musical instruments provide the background for songs and dances.

== See also ==
- Ancient music
- Behavioral modernity
- Neuroscience of music
- Evolutionary musicology
- International Study Group on Music Archaeology
- Onomatopoeia
- Origin of language
- Origins of religion
- Prehistoric art
- Sound symbolism
