= Melomania =

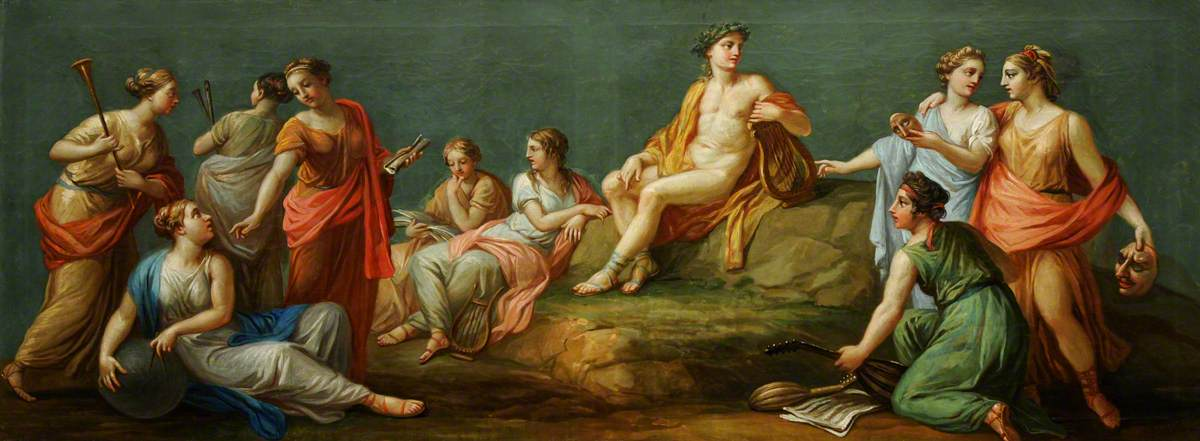
Antonio Zucchi, Apollo and the Muses, 1767.

Melomania is the intense attachment to music experienced by a music lover. Depending on the person, it can lead to exaggerated dependence. This music lover is passionate about music, and it is generally the aspect of their life they are most passionate about.

== Music lovers ==
Music lovers are divided, among others, into two groups:

- There are those who love a specific style of performance or musical genre,
- And those who connect with melodies (whether a cappella, instrumental, or from a complex ensemble) that they find magnificent, of any musical genre; these are, perhaps, the true lovers of music.

== Fusion of audiophilia and melomania ==
Melomania is the passionate attachment to and enjoyment of music, and audiófilia is the passionate pursuit and enjoyment of sound reproduction with the highest possible fidelity. The fusion of audiophilia and melomania occurs when technology becomes a transparent vehicle for emotion, allowing the listener not only to hear, but to experience the artistic intent, nuances, and soul of the music. Essentially, when the two merge, the listener stops worrying about how it sounds and becomes lost in what it sounds like, achieving a higher level of musical enjoyment.

== Musical Hedonia ==
This is a term that describes the brain's ability to experience pleasure through music. There is even musical anhedonia, which refers to people who feel nothing due to a lack of sensitivity to reward or pleasurable responses to music, suggesting that musical hedonia is a strictly neurological process.

== Musical Neuroscience ==
Neuroscience applied to music demonstrates that listening to or playing music activates complex brain areas, including the auditory, motor, and emotional systems. Studies show that music modulates emotions, reduces stress by releasing endorphins, enhances memory, and improves brain plasticity.

== See also ==
- Cognitive neuroscience of music
- Psychoanalysis and music
- Psychology of music
- Music and emotion
