= Psychoanalysis and music =

According to some music therapists, the use of music in the therapeutic environment has an affinity with psychoanalysis in that it addresses obstructions in the mind that might be causing stress, psychic tension, and even physical illness. Music has been used, in conjunction with a psychoanalytic approach, to address symptoms of a variety of mental disorders, as well as forms of emotional distress, such as grief, loss, mourning, and trauma.

== History ==
Sigmund Freud discussed shortly some musical phenomena in his book The Interpretation of Dreams (1900), but he was more interested in other arts, especially literature and the visual arts.

Freud's attitude toward music was ambivalent. He described himself as being "ganz unmusikalisch" (totally unmusical). Despite his much-protested resistance, he could enjoy certain operas such as Don Giovanni and The Marriage of Figaro and he used musical metaphors in the context of theory and therapy.

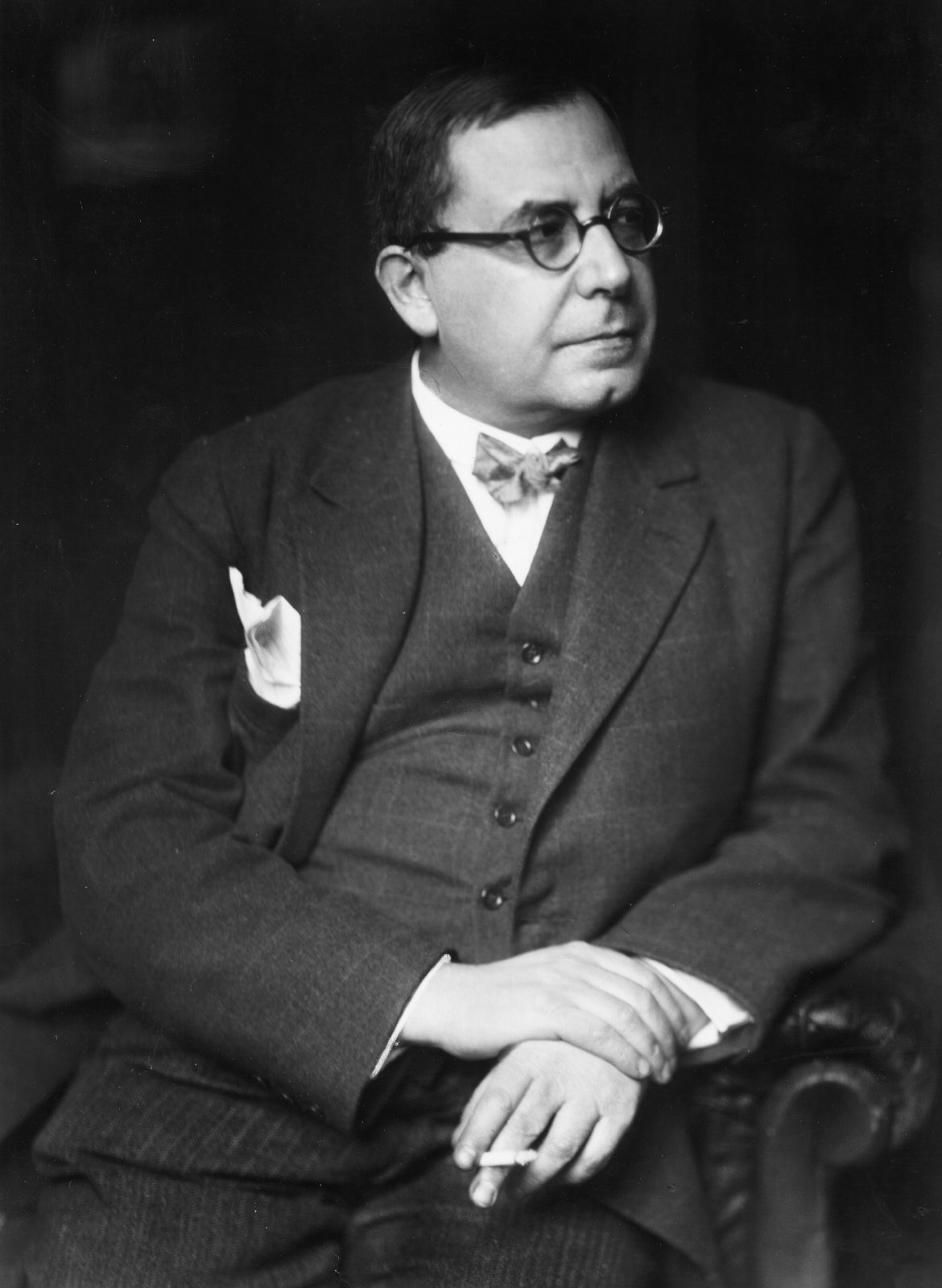
The musicologist Max Graf, a pioneer of psychoanalytic study of music.

Freud seemed to feel uneasy without a guide from the more rational part. To be emotionally moved by something without knowing what was moving him or why (to be more precise, the word used in German in the famous article The Moses of Michelangelo was 'ergreift', as if music could grab or hold) and this was an intrinsically anxious experience. The operas he listened were "conversational" and "narrative" forms of music, which is theorized, provided him with some kind of "cognitive control" over the emotional impact of the musical sounds. Cheshire argued that maybe he was jealous and feared the potential therapeutic power of music as a rival to psychoanalysis. To acknowledge the power of music to grab and to hold (ergreifen) was, no doubt, the first gesture towards a definition of the Unconscious in Music. Freud made an incredible contribution to the field, even without taking notice of it.

It was up to other early psychoanalysts than Freud to initiate a serious psychoanalytic study of musical phenomena. First of them was the musicologist and critic Max Graf (1873–1958) who presented his views in the "Wednesday meetings" in 1905–1912. Among other pioneers was Desiderius (Dezső) Mosonyi (1888–1945) who published his writings in Hungarian and in German.

The early views of music were reductive and romantic: the composer expresses him- or herself directly in a musical composition; the reception of music is regressive.

After 1950, psychoanalytical musicology started to flourish. Within a few years several studies were published by the French André Michel (1951), Ernst Kris (1952), Anton Ehrenzweig (1953), Theodor Reik (1953), and others.

Theodor Reik (1888–1969) was one of Freud's earliest students. Reik took up the theme of the "haunting melody" in Freud's Introductory Lectures on Psychoanalysis (1915–1917) to demonstrate, by contrast to Freud, that musical structure can represent feelings. In Reik's view, melody can convey emotion far better than words.

Reik showed that music is the voice of the “unknown itself” that may become compulsive in its attempt to convey a secret message. Reik speculated that the reason unconscious material sometimes emerges as a melody rather than as mere thoughts may be that melody better indicates moods and unknown feelings. He did demonstrate that songs on the mind could be effectively interacted with in a psychotherapeutic fashion in a way that helped resolve repressed conflict.

The flow of studies and articles from the latter part of the twentieth century was summarised in the two-volume essay collection Psychoanalytic Explorations in Music (1990–1993).

The ideas of Jacques Lacan have become very significant for the field of Psychoanalysis and Music, particularly through the writings of Anzieu and Didier-Weill. The first proposing that the mechanisms of identification originate from a kind of sound mirror originated by the interchanges between child and mother). The second, observing that the acceptance of a music, the yes given to it by a listener, means that the music is able to listen to something inside the listener that he/she is not aware of. The Unconscious in music being related to this inversion.

== Theories and therapeutic techniques ==
Music therapy involves different techniques of improving someone's quality of life. In Oliver Sack's book, Musicophilia he discusses several different ways that music can help people with dementia. Specifically, the perception of music, and the memories that are involved with music enable patients to make improvements in their cognitive powers, emotions, thoughts, feelings of freedom, stability, organization, and focus.

The aspect of emotion is a key element in what brings music and psychoanalysis together; they both involve a way of communicating emotion. In an article, about Music therapy and group work, the authors discuss how music and active listening play an important role in helping someone suffering from a mental illness improve their well-being. For example, in music, attunement, is how listeners are able to connect with others while listening to and making the music.

When a psychoanalytic therapist uses music with his patients, it makes for a more open experience. The patient is more apt to respond positively because they have more time to respond. Unlike most normal conversations and psychoanalytic questioning from a therapist, the music is not as intimidating for a patient to interact with; it allows the patient to free his or her thoughts with more ease.

Another reason music is being used as a method of therapy is due to its relational improvisation. Relational improvisation is a listeners ability to remember certain stories form their past and resonate them to the lyrics and schematic patterns of a song. This helps the patients get out frustrations with day to day challenges without causing any harm to themselves or others.

== Modes of approach ==
From a methodological point of view, there are several approaches visible in the psychoanalytical study of music and psychoanalytically inspired musicology:

1. Introspective studies examine one's musically induced experiences and their relations to the unconscious processes.
2. Biographical studies examine musicians' and composers' (auto)biographies and descriptions of musical experiences.
3. Psychoanalyses of musical patients are discussed.
4. Musical experiences are explained with theories of early personal development.
5. The elements of opera (including the hall, staging, plot, the human voice) have been examined.
6. Study of film music.
7. Analyses of musical compositions, without reference to the personality of the composer.
8. In music therapy, how to lift repressions and work them through.
9. In cultural studies, the beliefs, conceptions, and habits related to music can be analyzed to reveal unconscious meanings and thought patterns

== Case studies and real life experiences ==
Some patients with dementias such as Alzheimer's are able to play songs or musical pieces despite their diseases. One case study in particular, from Anne Cowles and several other authors, shows how a patient that had just been diagnosed with dementia was able to learn a new song to play on the violin.

A patient that was diagnosed with schizophrenia at age 15 went through a series of music therapy sessions. He initially began with a very angry and threatening attitude, but as the sessions continued, the therapist was able to attune with the patient and make progress. She discovered his longing for intimacy and love greatly contributed to his poor behavior. Although the patient was unable to succeed in breaking most of his habits of threatening behavior, the therapist was able to connect better with him because of music

A case study was held involving five children diagnosed with autism. These children where grouped in an interactive play setting that was individually designed according to music therapy principles. The music itself in the experiments proved to provide a comforting sound for the children, but after the music was over they would go back to their poor behavior and throwing temper tantrums.

Paula was involved in a case study to improve her recognition of her true self. Paula was a musical prodigy, who needed to improve her health and spontaneity. Over 14 months of therapy, which included 44 sessions of music therapy, she was able to gain a more healthy sense of identity. The music that was used in her therapy was different from the music she was used to playing and was better targeted to improve her well being and self-worth.

== Future: psychoanalysis, neuroscience and music ==
Recent developments in cognitive neuroscience of music have led to a new way of looking at music and emotion. Neurologist Oliver Sacks states that music occupies more areas of the brain than language does, and that humans are primarily a musical species.

Elaborating on this idea, psychoanalyst Gilbert Rose argues that our responsiveness to music begins with the nonverbal emotional rapport of the earliest infant–parent interplay. Reaching back even further, since the fetus has an active auditory system 3–4 months before birth, the rhythm of the mothers womb and the sound of her heartbeat could be the start of our responsiveness to music. Neuroscientist Antonio Damasio states that when an organism interacts with an object, nonverbal neural images map the organism, the object and the interaction between them. As psychoanalysis gives verbal insight of non-verbal emotional involvement, and recent neurosciences found that music is able to contact this non-verbal emotions, music is stated to help the unison of thinking and feeling.

== Influence of psychoanalysis on music ==
Although psychoanalysis has had some influence on literature and cinema since the early 20th century, it is more difficult to discern whether musical compositions have been actually inspired or influenced by psychoanalysis.

One candidate has been put up by Erik W. Tawaststjerna: in his biography of Jean Sibelius, he repeatedly emphasizes the psychological and even psychoanalytical dimensions of Sibelius's Fourth Symphony (1911). According to Tawaststjerna, the Symphony reflects the psychoanalytical and introspective era when Freud and Henri Bergson stressed the meaning of the unconscious. Even Sibelius himself called his composition "a psychological symphony". His brother, the psychiatrist Christian Sibelius (1869–1922), was one of the first scholars to discuss psychoanalysis in Finland. According to Tawaststjerna, the Fourth Symphony is "one of the most remarkable documents of the psychoanalytical era."

Another speculated candidate for psychoanalytically inspired composition is the monodrama Erwartung, composed by Arnold Schoenberg in Vienna, 1909. It is, however, not known if Schoenberg ever read Freud's writings. Schoenberg was a follower of Karl Kraus, a critic of psychoanalysis, and rejected psychoanalysis accordingly. Still, Freud's ideas were circulating among the general public at that time. In his writings, Schoenberg presented his views on aesthetics: ideally, art is intuitive expression of unconscious sensations.

== See also ==
- Music psychology

== Bibliography ==
- Boyer, L. B. (1992). Roles played by music as revealed during countertransference facilitated transference regression. International Journal of Psychoanalysis, 73, 55–67.
- Brousselle, André. "Un jeu de la Bobine Vicieux et Sublime: La Musique". Des Sublimations I, Revue Française de Psychanalyse, 5-6. Tome XLIII, 1979.
- Cheshire, Neil M. (1996). The empire of the ear: Freud's problem with music. International Journal of Psychoanalysis, 77, 1127–1168.
- Cramer, Alfred (1997). Music for the Future: Sounds of Psychology and Language in Works of Schoenberg, Webern, and Berg, 1909 to the First World War (Ph.D. thesis). University of Pennsylvania.
- Damasio, Antonio (1999). The feeling of what happens. New York: Harcourt Brace.
- Ehrenzweig, Anton (1953). The Psychoanalysis of the Artistic Vision and Hearing. Routledge, London.
- Faber, M. D. (1996). The pleasures of music: a psychoanalytic note. Psychoanalytic Review, 83, 419-433.
- Feder, Stuart – Karmel, Richard L. – Pollock, George H., eds. (1990). Psychoanalytic Explorations in Music. International Universities Press, Madison. ISBN 0-8236-4407-3
- Feder, Stuart – Karmel, Richard L. – Pollock, George H., eds. (1993). Psychoanalytic Explorations in Music. Second series. International Universities Press, Madison. ISBN 0-8236-4408-1
- Freud, Sigmund (1936). Letter to M. Bonaparte, 06.12.36. In Letters of Sigmund Freud, 1873–1939.
- Graf, Max (1947). From Beethoven to Shostakovitch: The Psychology of the Composing Process. Philosophical Library, New York.
- Haesler, Ludwig. "Sprachvertonung in Robert Schumanns Liederzyklus 'Dichterliebe' - 1840. Ein Beitrag zur Psychoanalyse der musikalischen Kreativitaet". Psyche 36, 1982, pp. 908–950.
- Kris, Ernst (1952). Psychoanalytic Explorations in Art. International Universities Press, New York.
- Kurkela, Kari (1993). Mielen maisemat ja musiikki: Musiikin esittämisen ja luovan asenteen psykodynamiikka. Musiikin tutkimuslaitoksen julkaisuja, 11. Sibelius-Academy, Helsinki. ISBN 952-9658-17-6
- Lehtonen, Kimmo (1986). Musiikki psyykkisen työskentelyn edistäjänä. Psykoanalyyttinen tutkimus musiikkiterapian kasvatuksellisista mahdollisuuksista. Turun yliopiston julkaisuja, C 56. [Diss.] University of Turku. ISBN 951-642-778-2
- Lång, Markus (2004). Psykoanalyysi ja sen soveltaminen musiikintutkimukseen. [Finnish: Psychoanalysis and its application to musicology.] Studia musicologica Universitatis Helsingiensis, 11 [12]. [Diss.] University of Helsinki. ISSN 0787-4294 ISBN 952-10-2197-7 Abstract.
- Lima, Paulo Costa. "Música: um paraíso familiar e inacessível", Percurso n. 15, 1995, p. 55-64.
- Lima, Paulo Costa. "Música e Psicanálise: uma possível interface". Análise Musical 8/9, nov. 1995, p. 58-73.
- Lima, Paulo Costa. "Brazilian Musical Libido". Journal for the Psychoanalysis of Culture & Society, Spring 1996, v. 1, n. 1, pp. 140–142.
- McDonald, Marjorie (1970). Transitional tunes and musical development. Psychoanalytical Study of the Child 25, s. 503–520. International Universities Press, New York.
- Michel, André (1951). Psychanalyse de la musique. Presses Universitaires de France, Paris.
- Michel, Andre (1966). L'école freudienne devant la musique. Editions du Scorpion, Paris.
- Michel, André (1991). Psychanalyse du fait musical. Gentilly.
- Montani, Angelo (1945). Psychoanalysis of Music. Psychoanalytical Review 3 (32. vsk.), pp. 225–227.
- Mosonyi, Dezső (1975): Psychologie der Musik. Herausgegeben von Pierre Mosonyi. Tonos, Darmstadt. [A zene lélektana új utakon, 1934.]
- Sacks, Oliver (2007). Musicophilia: Tales of music and the brain. Knopf publishing group.
- Reik, Theodor (1953). The haunting melody: Psychoanalytic experiences in life and music. New York: Farrar, Straus, and Young.
- Roazen, Paul (1975). Freud and his followers. Harmondsworth: Penguin books, 1979.
- Rose, Gilbert J. (2004). Between Couch and Piano: Psychoanalysis, Music, Art and Neuroscience. New York: Brunner-Routledge. ISBN 1-58391-973-2
- Schwarz, David (1997). Listening Subjects: Music, Psychoanalysis, Culture. Duke University Press, Durham. ISBN 0-8223-1922-5
- Sekeff, Maria de Lourdes. "O chiste e a música", ARTE Unesp, 2/4, 1986/88, p. 123-129.
- Sterba, Editha – Sterba, Richard (1964). Ludwig van Beethoven und sein Neffe: Tragödie eines Genies. Eine psychoanalytische Studie. Szczesny, München.
- Tawaststjerna, Erik (1989). Jean Sibelius 3. Helsinki: Otava. ISBN 951-1-10416-0
- Välimäki, Susanna (2005). Subject Strategies in Music: A Psychoanalytic Approach to Musical Signification. Acta Semiotica Fennica, vol. XXII. [Diss. at University of Helsinki.] International Semiotics Institute, Imatra. ISSN 1235-497X ISBN 952-5431-10-X
- Vereecken, C. "La voix, le silence, la musique". Quarto - Revue de l'ecole de la cause freudienne - ACF - en Belgique. Bruxelas, jun., 1994, pp. 88–90.
- Wickes, Lewis (1989). "Schoenberg, Erwartung, and the Reception of Psychoanalysis in Musical Circles in Vienna until 1910/11". Studies in Music. 23: 88–106.
