= Music and emotion =

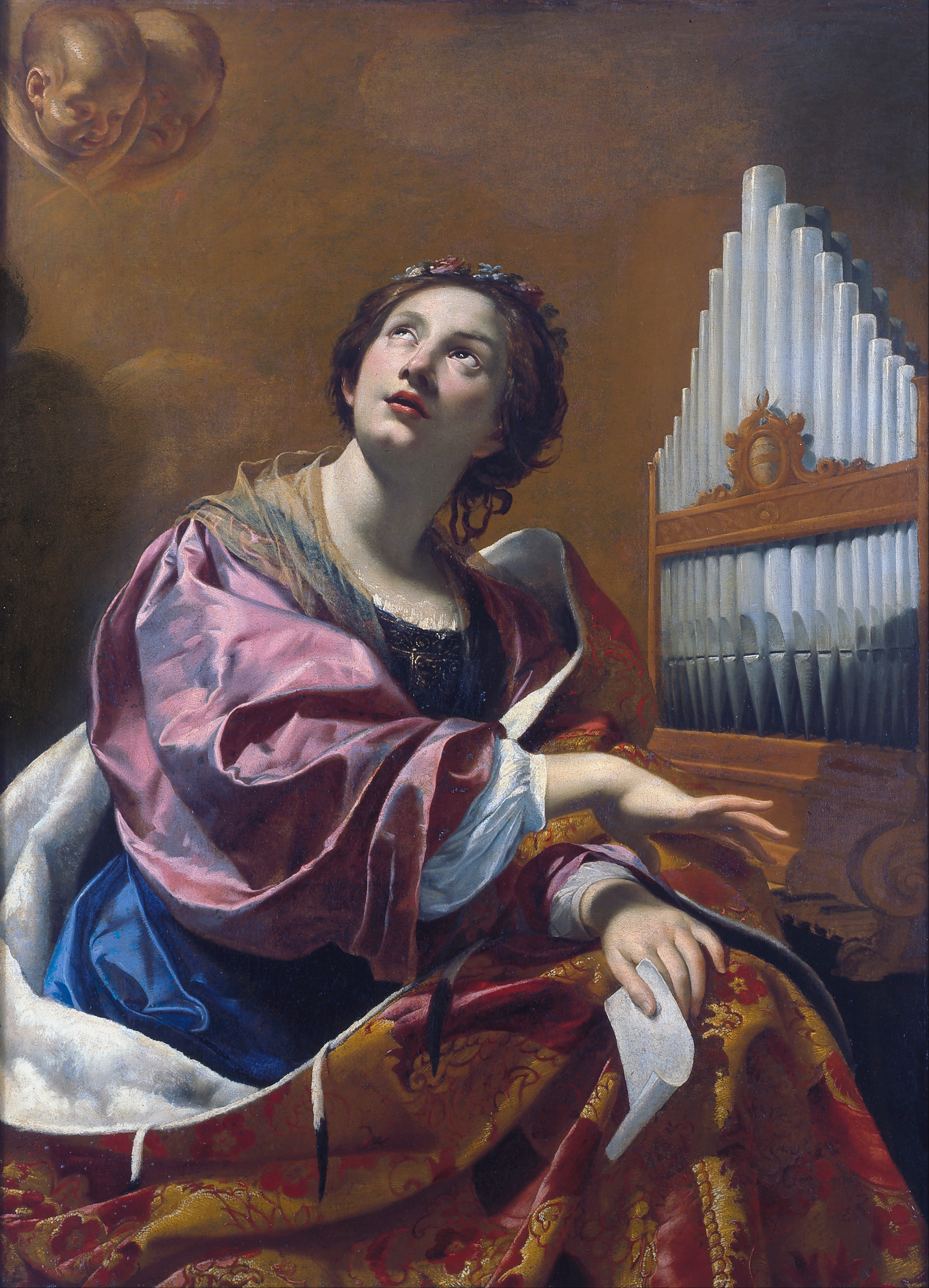
Simon Vouet, Saint Cecilia, c. 1626

Research into music and emotion seeks to understand the psychological relationship between human affect and music. The field, a branch of music psychology, covers numerous areas of study, including the nature of emotional reactions to music, how characteristics of the listener may determine which emotions are felt, and which components of a musical composition or performance may elicit certain reactions.

The research draws upon, and has significant implications for, such areas as philosophy, musicology, music therapy, music theory, and aesthetics, as well as the acts of musical composition and of musical performance like a concert.

== Overview ==
The ability to perceive emotion in music is known to develop early in childhood, and improve significantly through development. The ability to ascribe specific emotions to a piece of music begins in childhood, although there is not a scientific consensus as to the specific age in which this ability develops. By adulthood, humans have measurable physiological responses to music: Listening to music triggers the cerebellum, increases dopamine levels, and decreases cortisol levels in the brain.

The capacity to perceive emotion in music is also subject to cultural influences, and both similarities and differences in emotion perception have been observed in cross-cultural studies. Although perception of basic emotional features is culturally universal, people can more easily perceive emotion, particularly more nuanced emotion, in music from their own culture.

== Development ==
Musical-emotional development begins in infancy, where infants are often exposed to singing and singsongy speech from their parents. Infants tend to prefer positive speech to neutral speech as well as happy music to negative music. Until the age of around four, children are typically unable to differentiate between the emotions found in music, particularly for complex emotions, although babies as young as five months old have been able to discriminate between happy and sad musical excerpts under some conditions. However, children as young as three years old can still identify a musical excerpt as happy or sad based on major or minor mode. Four-and-five-year-old children are typically able to classify musical emotions as "happy" or "sad", but struggle with more complex labels such as "angry" and "afraid".

Musical-emotional associations can be innate, learned, or both. Studies on young children and isolated cultures show innate associations for features similar to a human voice (e.g. low and slow is sad, faster and high is happy). Cross-cultural studies show that associations between major and minor modes and consonance and dissonance are probably learned.

== Approaches ==
=== Appearance emotionalism ===
Some philosophers, such as Stephen Davies, argue that music evokes emotion by resembling human expressions of emotion, a theory that Davies termed "appearance emotionalism". According to the theory, the structure and form of music reflect human behaviors, such as movement and speech patterns, associated with emotional expression, causing the listener to feel these associated emotions while listening to a piece of music. Associations between musical features and emotion differ among individuals. Davies argues that expressiveness is an objective property of music and not subjective in the sense of being projected into the music by the listener. Critics of the theory argue that it is difficult to literally and objectively map musical characteristics to expressive behaviors, and that musical features that tend to provoke specific emotions, such as glissandos and low, dark timbres, do not necessarily resemble human expressive behavior relating to those emotions.

=== Neuroscience of music and emotion ===
Recent neuroscience has clarified how the brain predicts and responds to emotionally meaningful musical events. Research on rhythmic incongruity shows that violations of expected musical patterns trigger strong neural responses in auditory and frontal regions, supporting theories that the brain continuously uses predictive coding to interpret musical structure. These predictive mechanisms are a key component in the emotional power of anticipation and tension within music. Research comparing different forms of musical information processing has shown that pitch perception and vocal memory activate specialized neural systems, with memory advantages for vocal music emerging independently of pitch-processing ability. These findings support models in which emotional responses to music stem from distributed systems that process rhythm, pitch, timbre, and voice in different ways. Physiological studies further show that low-frequency musical components can amplify emotional and neural responses. High-intensity bass frequencies increase physiological arousal, modulate neural activity, and strengthen subjective reports of emotional intensity during listening. The involvement of subcortical pathways in low-frequency processing contributes to the visceral nature of music-induced emotion.

=== Process theory ===
Coined by philosopher Jennifer Robinson, the "emotions as process, music as process" theory (often shortened to just process theory) assumes the existence of a mutual dependence between cognition and elicitation of emotion. Robinson argues that the process of emotional elicitation begins with an "automatic, immediate response that initiates motor and autonomic activity and prepares us for possible action", causing a process of cognition that may enable listeners to name the felt emotion. This series of events cycles with new, incoming information. Robinson argues that emotions may transform into one another, causing blends and conflicts between felt emotions: Rather than a single emotional state, inner feelings are better thought of as the products of multiple emotional streams. When one listens to music, the emotional perceptions of different aspects of the music may reinforce or conflict with each other as new information is processed by the brain, affecting someone's overall perception of the emotion expressed by a piece of music.

=== Theory of musical equilibration ===
The theory of musical equilibration suggests that, rather than inherently having an emotional character, music inspires listeners to identify with messages that are often associated with emotions. For example, a minor chord may convey the message no more, which a listener would then translate to a feeling of sadness.

=== BRECVEM model ===
Juslin and Västfjäll developed a model of seven ways in which music can elicit emotion, called the BRECVEM model

- Brain stem reflex: Emotion is induced by music because one or more fundamental acoustical characteristics of the music is taken by the brain stem to signal a potentially important and urgent event. This is especially applicable to sudden, loud, and dissonant pieces of music that induce arousal.
- Rhythmic entrainment: The rhythm of a piece of music influences an internal bodily rhythm of the listener, such as heart rate, which in turn affects other components of emotion.
- Evaluative conditioning: An emotion is induced by music because the musical stimuli has been repeatedly paired with positive or negative stimuli, conditioning the listener to associate the positive or negative emotion with the music itself.
- Emotional contagion: A listener perceives the emotional expression of a piece of music, causing them to feel the perceived emotion themselves.
- Visual imagery: A listener conjures up visual images inspired by the music, which in turn provokes an emotional response.
- Episodic memory: An emotion is induced by music because the music reminds the listener of an emotional memory. This is sometimes referred to as the 'Darling, they are playing our tune' phenomenon.
- Musical expectancy: Emotion is induced in a listener because a feature of the music, such as rhythm or harmony, violates, delays, or confirms a listener's expectations.

In 2013, Juslin created an additional aspect to the BRECVEM model called aesthetic judgement, a measure of an individual's judgement of a piece of music's aesthetic value. Aesthetic judgement can involve a number of varying personal preferences, such as the message conveyed, skill presented or novelty of style or idea.

=== Framework for Adaptable Musical Emotions ===
Susino and colleagues developed the Framework for Adaptable Musical Emotions (FAME), which explains emotional responses to music through the mechanism of adaptability over time. The framework suggests that emotional responses to music are formed in an adaptive way to accommodate or assimilate a wide range of cues arising from psychophysical, cultural, and personal variables interacting with situational contexts. Emotional adaptability helps to explain and predict the convergence and divergence of emotional responses to music across individuals and cultures over time.

== Specific factors affecting emotion ==
Many different aspects of a piece of music come together to create its overall emotional perception, including structure, performance, listener demographics, and context.

=== Structural features ===
Structural features are specific aspects of a piece of music itself, disregarding how it is played, who is listening, and other contextual cues. There are two types of structural features: Segmental features are the individual sounds or tones that make up the music, such as duration, amplitude, and pitch, while suprasegmental features are the foundational structures of a piece, such as melody, tempo, and rhythm. There are a number of specific musical features that are highly associated with particular emotions. Within the factors affecting emotional expression in music, tempo is typically regarded as the most important, but a number of other factors, such as mode, loudness, and melody, also influence the emotional valence of the piece.

| Structural Feature | Definition | Associated Emotions | Citation |
|---|---|---|---|
| Tempo | The speed or pace of a musical piece | Fast tempo: arousal, valence | |
| Mode | The type of scale | Major tonality: happiness, joy. Minor tonality: sadness | |
| Loudness | The physical strength and amplitude of a sound | Louder music: higher levels of arousal | |
| Harmony | The linear succession and interaction of musical tones and chords | Resolving harmonies: tension and release. Unexpected harmonies: surprise | |
| Style | The style and phrasing of the music | Staccato music: tense, energetic, amusing, surprising. Legato music: cohesive, calm, sad, scary | |

==== Harmony ====
Major-key music is generally perceived with positive emotional valence, while minor-key music is perceived as having negative emotional valence, an association that has existed at least since 1935. The theory of musical equilibration suggests that the quality of their tonic triads, the variability of the minor scale, and the instability of sharps and leading tones in minor keys are factors in the minor key's typically darker sound. Major and minor chords are similar emotively to their respective keys, with major triads tending to elicit higher levels of valence, energy, and happiness and lower levels of melancholy, nostalgia, and tension compared to minor triads. Minor triads are also considered more dissonant by listeners, a feature which tends to elicit negative emotions.

The harmonic movement of a specific piece of music can also impact emotion. For example, a large difference of surprise and uncertainty of the last chord of a four-chord progression compared to the previous three chords is associated with higher levels of physical sensation in the head, indicating a possible emotional response due to the subversion of the expected chord. On the other hand, converging from a tense chord to a more stable one in a progression can produce a tension-and-release effect in listeners.

==== Pitch ====
Music that varies more in pitch is associated with higher levels of arousal in listeners.

==== Tempo and duration ====
Faster music is associated with higher levels of arousal in listeners. It is also associated with slightly higher levels of valence. Pieces of music with a faster tempo also tend to be judged as longer than same-duration pieces of music with a slower tempo.

==== Volume and dynamics ====
Louder music is associated with higher levels of arousal in listeners.

==== Style and rhythm ====
Legato music tends to be perceived as cohesive, calm, sad, and scary compared to staccato music, which is typically perceived as more tense, energetic, amusing, and surprising. In the minor mode, staccato melodies are generally perceived as happier than legato melodies. Many people also feel restless and unable to sit still after hearing specific rhythms.

==== Lyrics ====
Music without lyrics is unlikely to elicit social emotions like anger, shame, and jealousy; it typically only elicits basic emotions, like happiness and sadness.

=== Performance features ===
Performance features refer to the manner in which a piece of music is executed by the performer(s). These are broken into two categories: performer skills, and performer state. Performer skills include the compound ability and appearance of the performer; including physical appearance, reputation, and technical skills. The performer state include the interpretation, motivation, and stage presence of the performer. When emotions are expressed in a performance, the audience can gain a better understanding of what the music represents. Listeners' perceptions of emotions in music also tend to match the emotional expression of the performer, even if it contradicts how they would typically perceive it otherwise: For example, a listener may perceive a typically sad minor-key song as happy if the performer playing it has a happy expression.

=== Listener features ===
Listener features refer to the individual and social identity of the listener(s). This includes their personality, age, gender, knowledge of music, sociocultural background, and motivation to listen to the music. In general, there is little difference between the emotional perceptions of musical novices and musical experts in Western cultures. On the other hand, children tend to prefer more arousing music, while adults tend to prefer more positive music. Among Chinese listeners, men tend to prefer sadder music. One's emotional perception of a piece of music is also largely shifted towards their emotional state at time of listening. Emotional perception is also correlated with personality: More neurotic people tend to have stronger sad reactions, and more agreeable people tend to have stronger emotional reactions in general.

=== Extra-musical features ===
Extra-musical features refer to extra-musical information detached from auditory music signals, such as the genre or style of music.

==== Conflicting cues ====
Oftentimes, emotional factors interact with each other. Mixed-cue music, for example, has two simultaneous musical cues that are associated with contradictory emotions, such as a typically-happy major key paired with a typically-sad slow tempo. Past research has argued that opposing emotions like happiness and sadness fall on a bipolar scale, where both cannot be felt at the same time. More recently, scientists have suggested that happiness and sadness are experienced separately, which implies that they can be felt concurrently. For example, when listening to happy/sad mixed-cue music, listeners tend to feel sad and happy simultaneously, albeit at a lower intensity than non-mixed-cue music.

== Elicitation of emotion ==
Music has the potential to both convey and elicit emotions in its listeners. This view often causes debate because the emotion is produced within the listener, and is consequently hard to measure. Cognitivists argue that music simply displays an emotion, but does not allow for the personal experience of emotion in the listener. Emotivists argue that music elicits real emotional responses in the listener. In spite of controversy, current research suggests that music can elicit emotions in listeners. For example, after listening to happy or sad music, listeners tend to feel happier or sadder respectively. Music can also tap into empathy, inducing emotions that are assumed to be felt by the performer or composer. In addition to affecting felt emotion itself, music may also affect reactional components of emotion, such as physiological responses, motoric expression of emotion, and physical movement.

The context in which music is experienced has been found to play a major role in shaping how people respond. In addition to the structural features of music, like harmony and rhythm, physical and social environments are significant in eliciting emotional reactions. Recent research has shown that live musical performances tend to evoke stronger emotional and bodily responses than recordings of the same songs. In recent research, motion capture technology was used to measure how audience members reacted to live and recorded versions of identical musical performances. Researchers found that audience members moved their heads more actively and in better rhythm with the music during the live shows. Fans of the artist reacted more notably, which suggests that personal connection and crowd participation can make the experience feel more intense.

Music also affects socially-relevant memories, specifically memories produced by nostalgic musical excerpts. Although all familiar music induces stronger emotional responses, musical structures are more strongly interpreted in certain areas of the brain when the music evokes nostalgia, including the interior frontal gyrus, substantia nigra, cerebellum, and the insular cortex. Because music is also processed by the lower, sensory levels of the brain, making it impervious to later memory distortions, a familiar musical excerpt can trigger emotional memories that may have otherwise been hard to access.

=== Measurement ===
==== Self-report ====
The self-report method is a verbal or written report by the listener regarding what they are experiencing. This is the most widely used method for studying emotion and has shown that people identify emotions and personally experience emotions while listening to music. Scales such as the Geneva Emotional Music Scale are frequently used to quantity felt emotion. However, self-report is still subject to biases such as social desirability bias.

==== Physiological responses ====
Emotions are known to create physiological, or bodily, changes in a person, which can be tested experimentally. For example, arousing music is related to increased heart rate and muscle tension, while calming music is connected to decreased heart rate, decreased muscle tension, and increased skin temperature. Researchers test these responses through the use of instruments for physiological measurement, such as recording pulse rate.

Studies using rhythmic and predictive frameworks show that music entrains neural timing mechanisms, influencing attention, expectation, and physiological regulation. These entrainment effects help explain why music can modulate arousal, reduce stress, and restore autonomic balance.

The intensity and spectral properties of music also shape listeners’ physiological responses. Amplified bass has been found to elevate physiological engagement, increase bodily synchronization to rhythm, and heighten subjective emotional experience. These findings indicate that music affects not only emotion but also cardiophysiological and sensorimotor systems.

==== Expressive behavior ====
People are also known to show outward manifestations of their emotional states while listening to music. Studies using facial electromyography (EMG) have found that people react with subliminal facial expressions when listening to expressive music. Changes in harmony can also cause outward physical responses such as shivering or goose bumps, while tears and a lump-in-the-throat sensation are provoked by changes in melody. In addition, music provides a stimulus for expressive behavior in many social contexts, such as concerts, dances, and ceremonies.

=== Strength of effects ===
Elicitation and perception ratings in music are highly correlated, but not identical. Certain musical cues have different effects and different intensities of effects on perceived versus felt emotions.In general, emotions are less often conveyed by music than elicited, but are more intense than elicited emotions when they are conveyed. The strength of perceived and elicited emotions are dependent on the structures of the piece of music: Perceived emotions are stronger than elicited emotions for arousing, positive, and negative music, while elicited emotions are stronger than perceived emotions for pleasant music. Perceived emotions are also more consistent than elicited emotions.

== Music as a therapeutic tool ==
Music therapy as a therapeutic tool has been shown to be an effective treatment for various ailments. Therapeutic techniques involve eliciting emotions by listening to music, composing music or lyrics and performing music.

Music therapy sessions can help drug users who are attempting to break a drug habit by making it easier for them to feel emotions without drugs. It also can serve as an outlet for emotional expression, particularly for autistic people. Music therapy may also help people who are experiencing extended stays in a hospital due to illness.

=== Music and emotion regulation ===
Music is widely used as a tool for emotional self-regulation, especially during periods of stress or psychological challenge. Scholarly analyses report that individuals frequently rely on music to stabilize mood, manage anxiety, and cope with emotionally intense experiences. These effects are observed across both everyday listening and structured therapeutic environments. Sad-sounding or slow-tempo music does not reliably induce sadness; instead, listeners often report feelings of comfort, nostalgia, or emotional release. These experiences are thought to arise from autobiographical reflection and aesthetic appreciation rather than direct emotional contagion. As a result, music can serve as a safe emotional space in which complex emotions can be explored and transformed.

The goal is to transition an individual from being a music lover to entering the realm of melomania, where music is intuitively used to elevate their emotional state. Rather than following rigid rules, this shift is about navigating the melodies and allowing the brain to simply feel, transforming listening into a deep dive, a second, more focused experience that achieves true well-being.

However, we must distinguish this from a state that borders on madness or musomania. While healthy melomania is a journey of natural discovery and freedom, an uncontrollable obsession becomes tied to a forced high, it could be something similar to the effect of drugs. True melomania doesn't pressure the mind; it sets it free.

== See also ==
- Doctrine of the affections – Theory in the aesthetics of painting, music, and theatre, widely used in the Baroque era
- Empfindsamkeit (music) – Style of musical composition and poetry developed in 18th-century Germany
- History of music
- Music
- Music archaeology
- Music history
- Music-specific disorders
- Glossary of music terminology
- List of musicology topics
