= Music-specific disorders =

Disorders relating to the perception of music

Music-specific disorders impede one's ability to comprehend, respond to, and enjoy music; these disorders can be both congenital (present at birth) and acquired. They may interfere with one's ability to perceive elements of music, such as pitch, melody, harmony, and rhythm; the ability to react both emotionally and with bodily movements (e.g. dancing) to music; to form music-related memories; and the ability to create and perform music. While music is traditionally regarded as a purely auditory phenomenon, modern scientific study of music – the musicology – is a interdiscipline between psychology, neuroscience, and cognitive science. Investigating music-specific disorders under these scopes has helped us better understand the psychology and neuroscience of music.

== Background ==
Modern musicology identifies music with a few common, though not mandatory, characteristics: pitch, melody, harmony, timbre, time relations, (both tempo and rhythm), and its ability to evoke an emotional response.

=== Pitch ===
In the physical sense of the term, the word "pitch" refers to the frequency of a sound. Another term that is frequently used by music neuroscientists is "fine-grained pitch processing" which refers to the ability of a person to distinguish minor changes or fluctuations in pitch. Processing pitch is an extremely integral part of music cognition. Recent developments in brain scanning techniques have shown that the posterior secondary cortex plays an extremely important part in the processing of pitch in the brain. In music, "pitch relation" is more important than pitch itself. A subset of five to seven pitches creates a scale. The scale tones are "not equivalent and are organized around a central tone, called the tonic" (Peretz 2005).

=== Time relations ===
Temporal organization of music is commonly referred to as "rhythm". In 1982 the neuroscientist Fraisse claimed that there are mainly two types of time relations that are fundamental to musical temporal organization: (1) "the segmentation of an ongoing sequence into temporal groups" based on the duration values (in musical terms a whole, half, quarter, eighth or sixteenth note), and (2) "extraction of an underlying temporal regularity or beat".

In the brain, it is believed that the right hemisphere better handles meter, while the left hemisphere better handles rhythm. Scientists have studied patients with brain lesions in their right temporal auditory cortex and realized that they were unable to "tap a beat or generate a steady pulse".

=== Timbre ===
"Timbre" refers to the quality of a musical note that enables us to distinguish between different kinds of sound production. It is the characteristic of music that helps us recognize an instrument or source of a particular sound—such as a piano, saxophone, or a flute.

=== Memory ===
Music unfolds over time, and therefore the "auditory cognitive system must depend to a large degree on mechanisms that allow a stimulus to be maintained on-line to be able to relate one element in a sequence to another that occurs later" (Peretz 2005). Research has shown that working memory mechanisms for pitch information over a short period of time may be different from those involved in speech. In addition to the role that auditory cortices play in working memory for music, neuroimaging and lesion studies prove that frontal cortical areas also play an important role.

=== Emotion ===
Music is not merely "limited to perception and memory", but is also closely related to emotion. The mode of music (major or minor), and the tempo of a song (fast or slow) can evoke joy or sorrow in the listener. In the brain, emotional analysis is carried out by "a common cortical relay, suggesting no direct access to subcortical, limbic structures".

== Musical disorders ==
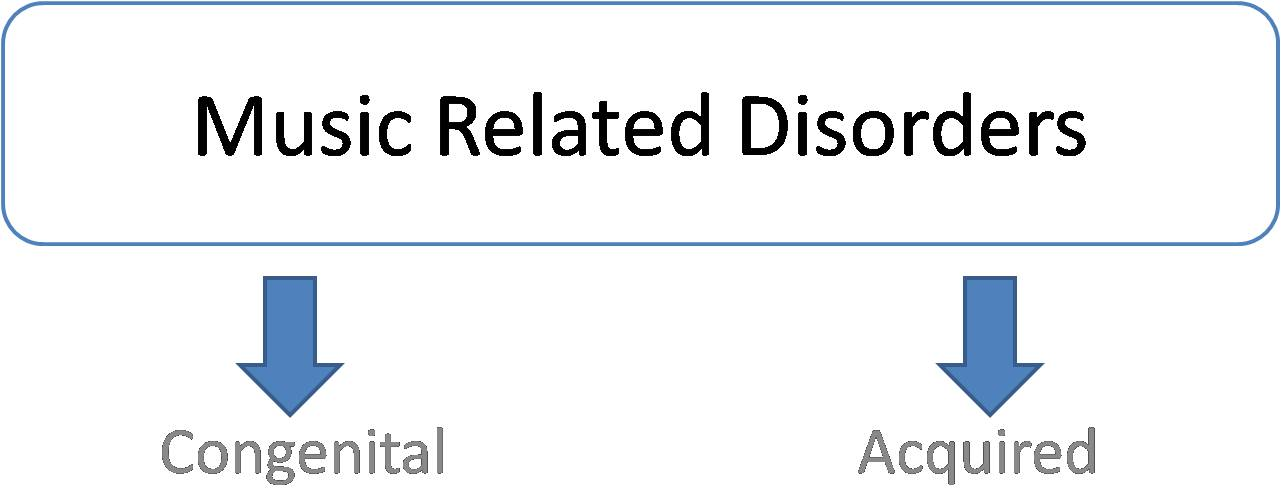
Music-specific disorders may be acquired or congenital

With a growing interest in music cognition amongst neuroscientists, music-specific disorders are becoming more relevant in research and in understanding music processing in the brain. Several music-specific disorders have been identified, with causes ranging from congenital to acquired (specific lesions in the brain).

=== Amusia ===
==== Definition and history ====
Amusia refers to the inability of certain individuals to recognize simple tunes. Amusia is commonly referred to as tone-deafness, tune-deafness, dysmelodia, or dysmusia. The first documented case of congenital amusia was reported in 2002 by music neuroscientists from the Department of Psychology at the University of Montreal, Canada. The case followed the case of a middle-aged woman who "lacks most basic musical abilities". Some of the techniques that are used in studying this disorder are functional magnetic resonance imaging (fMRI), positron emission tomography or PET scans, and anatomical MRI.

==== Symptoms and causes ====
Amusia may be congenital or acquired. Congenital amusia, as the term suggests, occurs as a result of birth or one's genes; while acquired amusia occurs as a result of accidental brain damage, stress, or cognitive deficits. Symptoms of this disease vary from lack of basic melodic discrimination, recognition despite normal audiometry, above average intellectual, memory, as well as language skills (Peretz 2002). Another conspicuous symptom of amusia is the ability of the affected individual to carry out normal speech, however, he or she is unable to sing. Amusic individuals "show a particular deficit in discriminating musical pitch variations and in recognizing familiar melodies". Neuroscientists are now classifying congenital amusia as a "new class of learning disabilities that affect musical abilities" (Ayotte 2002).

=== Acquired music agnosia ===
==== Definition ====
The term "agnosia" refers to a loss of knowledge. Acquired music agnosia is the "inability to recognize music in the absence of sensory, intellectual, verbal, and mnesic impairments". Music agnosia is most commonly acquired; in most cases it is a result of bilateral infarction of the right temporal lobes. In his article, Satoh states "when pure word deafness, auditory sound agnosia, and receptive amusia occur simultaneously, the state is called auditory agnosia" (Satoh 2007). However, one must understand the subtle difference between auditory and music agnosia; the former refers to the inability to recognize environmental sounds while the latter refers to the inability to recognize music.

==== Symptoms and causes ====
The main symptoms of music agnosia range from the inability to recognize pitch, rhythm, chords, and notes to the inability to discriminate and recognize familiar songs, and judge tonality, and reproduce musical phrases. As was previously mentioned the main causes for music agnosia are lesions in the right or bilateral temporal lobes (Satoh 2007) or unilateral strokes.

=== Musical hallucinations ===
==== Definition ====
Musical hallucinations (MH) can be described as perceptions of musical sounds in the absence of external auditory stimuli. Although imagined sounds can be non-musical – such as bells, whistles and sirens – case studies indicate that music "[takes] precedence over all other auditory hallucinations" (Sacks, 2006). Furthermore, MH may often take the form of songs from childhood and may be connected with strong childhood emotions.

==== Symptoms and causes ====
In a literature review by Evers and Ellger (2004), manifestations of MH can also be attributed to psychiatric disorders, brain lesions, epilepsy, and intoxication. Of great interest to researchers are individuals who experience MH with focal lesions and epileptic brain activity. Until recently, neurologists believed in a hemispheric dominance theory of music. Brain scans of subjects with lesions seem to refute this notion. Evers and Ellger (2004) found no significant difference in the hemisphere associated with the lesion as the major cause of MH.

== See also ==
- Auditory processing disorder
- Cognitive neuroscience of music
- Music psychology
- Musical anhedonia
- Music archaeology
- Musicogenic seizure
- Safe listening
- List of musicology topics
- Lists of musicians
