= Geneva Emotional Music Scale =

Rating scale measuring emotions elicited by music

The Geneva Emotional Music Scale (GEMS) is a rating scale for measuring emotion elicited by music. The GEMS groups music-inspired emotions into nine dimensions: wonder, transcendence, nostalgia, tenderness, peacefulness, joyful activation, power, tension, and sadness. The nine dimensions can be further organized into three second-order factors: vitality, consisting of joyful activation and power, unease, consisting of tension and sadness, and sublimity, consisting of transcendence, nostalgia, tenderness, peacefulness, and wonder. Some researchers have suggested additional emotional terms, such as boredom, interest, impetus, humor, and enthusiasm. The scale has high reliability and is more accurate in discriminating emotions experienced by music than other emotion rating scales not designed for music-based emotions, such as the dimensional emotion scale and the discrete emotion scale. Estimates of the emotional effects of musical excerpts based on the GEMS generally stabilize at around 10-20 listeners.

== Creation ==
The GEMS was created by Marcel Zentner, Didier Grandjean and Klaus Scherer to fulfill the need for an empirically-designed rating scale to measure self-reported emotions elicited by music. Zentner, Grandjean and Scherer surveyed college students at the University of Geneva and used factor analysis to categorize emotions perceived when listening to music into nine factors: tender longing, amazement, tranquility, joy, activation, power, sensuality, transcendence, and dysphoria. A tenth factor, sadness, was added due to its conceptual importance in the field of music psychology. After a follow-up study, the factors were adjusted and narrowed down to nine: wonder, transcendence, tenderness, nostalgia, peacefulness, power, joyful activation, tension, and sadness. The initial paper describing the GEMS was the second-most-cited paper in the journal Emotion between 2009 and 2023.

== Versions ==
The original version of the GEMS contains 45 labels for self-rating that align with the nine core factors. Newer versions GEMS-25 and GEMS-9, containing 25 and 9 labels respectively, are designed for quicker response. For example, the GEMS-9 only assesses each dimension with one item. Despite this, it is similar in inter-rater agreement and average ratings for individual excerpts, though it does disagree with the full-length scale depending on how the GEMS-45 score is computed.

Although the GEMS was originally based on French-language emotions, the GEMS also exists in other languages, including English, Polish, and German.
