= Marcel Zentner =

Austrian psychologist

- Occupation: Professor of Psychology

Academic background
- Education: University of Zurich

Academic work
- Discipline: Psychology
- Institutions: University of Innsbruck
- Main interests: Personality development, psychological assessment, music psychology, psychology of mating, psychology of emotion

Marcel Zentner is a Professor of Psychology at the University of Innsbruck most noted for his contributions to music psychology and related assessment tools, particularly the Geneva Emotional Music Scale.

== Education ==
Between 1986 and 1992, Zentner studied psychology, clinical child psychology, and philosophy at the University of Zurich and Harvard University. He received a licentiate diploma in psychology in 1992 from the University of Zurich. In 1996, he got his PhD in psychology, psychopathology, and philosophy from the University of Zurich. He received a habilitation in psychology from the University of Fribourg, Switzerland in 2004.

== Academic positions ==
Zentner worked as a post-doctoral associate for the department of psychology of Harvard University. He worked as a maitre-assistant for the Geneva Emotion Research Group from 1996 to 2001. He held a SNSF professorship at the University of Geneva from 2001 to 2007 and then worked as an associate professor at the University of York from 2008 to 2013. Since 2014, he has been a professor of personality psychology and psychological assessment at the University of Innsbruck.

== Geneva Emotional Music Scale ==
Along with Didier Grandjean and Klaus Scherer, Zentner developed the Geneva Emotional Music Scale, the first self-report scale designed to measure emotions felt by music. The GEMS was initially designed as a 45-item inventory based on a nine-factor model of emotions experienced by music, but 25-item and 9-item versions were later created as well without losing much reliability. The GEMS is more accurate in discriminating emotion experienced by music than other emotional scales not designed for music perception. Zentner gave a TedX Talk describing the GEMS in 2021.

The initial paper describing the GEMS by Zentner, Grandjean and Scherer was the second-most cited article in the journal Emotion between 2009 and 2023.

== Other work ==
In 2012, alongside Lily Law, Zentner developed the Profile of Music Perception Skills (PROMS), an objective test of musical ability. The PROMS has the ability to distinguish between musical ability and musical experience. Two shortened versions, called the Short-PROMS and the Mini-PROMS, were developed in 2017. For the rapid screening of musicality, the Micro-PROMS and the Music-Mindedness Questionnaire were added in 2024 and 2025.

In 2024, Zentner and others developed the Emotion-to-Music Mapping Atlas (EMMA), a database of music tracks rated using the GEMS in an academic setting. As of November 2025, the EMMA has 817 rated musical tracks in its database based on the rating of 867 participants. EMMA served as a basis for a neural network approach to automatically predict emotions evoked by music without requiring human raters.

In addition to music-emotion assessment, Zentner has also studied physiological responses to music, mechanisms underlying music-evoked emotions, and musical development in children. Along with Jerome Kagan, he found that preverbal infants prefer consonant to dissonant melodies. With Tuomas Eerola, he showed that infants have a precocious ability to move in time with music and other rhythmically regular sounds.

He has also studied effects of gender parity on romantic partner preferences and on gender non-conforming individuals. He has contributed research on temperament assessment by providing an integrative model of child temperament and related assessment tools.

In 2015, with Rebecca Shiner, Zentner published Handbook of Temperament, a book about the development of temperament and personality.
