= Musical anhedonia =

Neurological condition

- Specialty: Neurology
- Symptoms: Inability to derive pleasure from music
- Differential diagnosis: Music agnosia

Musical anhedonia (or specific musical anhedonia) is a neurological phenomenon characterized by a lack of sensitivity to reward from or pleasurable responses to music. People with this experience, unlike those suffering from amusia, have no deficiencies in their perception of music, but fail to derive pleasure from music listening while maintaining normal hedonic response to non-musical stimuli. Musical anhedonia has been found to be both acquired, occurring as a result of brain damage, and present in the absence of any neurological damage.

Research has shown that people with this condition have reduced functional connectivity between the cortical regions responsible for processing sound and the subcortical regions related to reward. Musical anhedonia without brain damage has been estimated from studies to be present in 5-10% of the general population while acquired musical anhedonia resulting from focal brain damage likely much rarer in occurrence.

== Symptoms and characterization ==
Symptoms of musical anhedonia primarily involve reduced or non-existent hedonic responses to musical stimuli. Accordingly, individuals with musical anhedonia display affected behavioral responses to music, such as difficulty selecting music or reporting music to be less pleasurable than individuals without musical anhedonia, as well as diminished physiological pleasure responses when listening to music in the form of absent or less intense frisson and significantly reduced heart rate and skin conductance during moments of high pleasure typically experienced by non-musically anhedonic individuals.

Two defining aspects of musical anhedonia that differentiate it from generalized anhedonia is a lack of deficit in musical perception in the affected individual and maintenance of normal hedonic responses to non-musical rewarding stimuli, which gives rise to the term specific musical anhedonia. This was determined through an earlier study assessing musical and monetary reward sensitivity in individuals with musical anhedonia with behavioral tasks and objective markers of emotional arousal (i.e., electrodermal activity and heart rate).

=== Interactions with auditory and aesthetic stimuli ===
Several studies have investigated responses of musically anhedonic individuals to varying aspects of music, auditory stimuli, and aesthetic stimuli.

==== Timbre ====
While research on specific musical anhedonia have primarily focused on musical anhedonic individuals' responses to melodic and rhythmic processing, more recent research suggests that musically anhedonic responses are also modulated by musical timbre. When musically anhedonic and non-musically anhedonic individuals were presented synthesized sounds of varying timbres (sounds of varying timbre with no clear real-world equivalents), individuals affected by musical anhedonia reported "pleasing" sounds as significantly less pleasurable compared to those without musical anhedonia, despite similar responses from both groups to unpleasant sounds.

==== Groove ====
Research suggests that groove is affected by the musically anhedonic condition in a complex manner. When presented drum pattern excerpts of varying complexity, subjects with musical anhedonia reported both significantly lower derived pleasure and want to move from the excerpts compared to normal subjects. However, musically anhedonic subjects demonstrated a relationship between pleasure and movement ratings and stimulus complexity similar to that within non-musically anhedonic subjects, reporting the highest ratings for drum pattern excerpts of intermediate complexity. Additionally, across both groups, pleasure ratings were most strongly related with music reward sensitivity for highly complex stimuli, meaning music reward sensitivity best predicted pleasure ratings for drum pattern excerpts of high complexity regardless of the individual's musical anhedonic status.

==== Non-musical emotional sounds ====
Findings regarding musical anhedonia-affected individuals' responses to non-musical emotional sounds are inconsistent. When exposed to real-world emotional sounds (e.g., baby's laughter, breaking glass), musical anhedonics were found to be no different in behavioral or physiological responses from normal controls in derived pleasure. However, when presented with short, isolated sounds synthesized to be pleasing or displeasing without real-world sources, subjects with musical anhedonia reported receiving substantially less pleasure from sources that subjects without musical anhedonia found pleasing.

==== Visual art ====
Individuals affected by musical anhedonia were found to have normal hedonic responses to visual art. When compared with subjects without musical anhedonia in their responses to visual art in the form of paintings, those affected by musical anhedonia were found to be no different in behavioral measures, as measured through subjective ratings of pleasure, arousal, and familiarity and time spent watching the paintings, as well as physiological measures, with participants' skin conductance response being comparable between musically anhedonic and non-musically anhedonic individuals.

== Diagnosis ==
The diagnosis of musical anhedonia is typically determined through self-report and requires multiple investigative tools, primarily centering around the standard measure of the Barcelona Music Reward Questionnaire (BMRQ). The BMRQ, a 20-item questionnaire which assesses the individual's experience of reward associated with music, represents a range of musical experiences classified into five categories: musical seeking, emotion evocation, mood regulation, sensory-motor, and social reward. Typically, participants of studies identified as being musically anhedonic if they score below a 65 on the BMRQ which roughly corresponds to the lowest 10th percentile of scores on the BMRQ.

In addition to the BMRQ, individuals being identified for having musical anhedonia must complete additional questionnaires to determine the specificity of their anhedonic response to music in the absence of deficits in musical perception. Musically anhedonic individuals must display scores indicating normal hedonic responses to pleasure-eliciting stimuli on a general anhedonia scale such as the Physical Anhedonia Scale (PAS), a 40-item scale which measures an inability to derive pleasure from physical sensations, or the Snaith-Hamilton Pleasure Scale (SHAPS), a 14-item scale which assess hedonic response through the four domains of interests and pastimes, social interaction, sensory experience, and food and drink. Moreover, the individuals in question must also rule out the contribution of deficits in musical perception to affected hedonic response to music through the Montreal Battery for the Evaluation of Amusia which is a widely-used used assessment for amusia, a music-processing disorder which typically affects pitch processing and musical memory and recognition.

=== Classification ===
There are two general classifications of musical anhedonia: musical anhedonia without brain damage and acquired musical anhedonia following brain damage.

==== Musical anhedonia without brain damage ====
Musical anhedonia without brain damage refers to musical anhedonia present in individuals that cannot be explained by prior brain lesions. This disorder affects an approximate 5% to 10% of the population as estimated by prior studies assessing individual differences in musical reward in individuals identifying musically-anhedonic individuals among the study participants.

Research suggests that musical anhedonia without brain damage emerges in individuals due to mixed contributions of genetic factors and environmental influence in development. A genetic study using a similar individual differences approach with twin modeling estimated that genetic effects contribute up to 54% of variability in musical reward sensitivity within individuals, with 70% of these genetic effects independent from general reward sensitivity and music perception abilities. Moreover, the development of an adapted BMRQ for parents' reports of children's music reward sensitivity found substantial variability in music reward sensitivity among children between 3 and 7 years of age, with a subset of child participants displaying low scores on the BMRQ without an associated negative affective processing. These findings support the notion of individual differences in musical reward sensitivity being distinct from global anhedonia and musical perception abilities, as in musical anhedonia, and suggest a congenital or early onset of musical anhedonia in development.

==== Acquired musical anhedonia ====
Acquired musical anhedonia is the presence of musical anhedonia in individuals as a result of brain damage. Acquired musical anhedonia is much rarer than musical anhedonia without brain damage with most work on acquired musical anhedonia consisting of individual case studies. One large group study surveying patients with focal brain damage to identify the frequency and specificity of acquired musical anhedonia found a single possible case of musical anhedonia among 78 patients with focal brain damage, resulting from damage to the right hemisphere putamen and internal capsule.

Various cases of acquired musical anhedonia have revealed changes in individual musical reward to be associated with changes in the connectivity of the auditory and reward systems. Case studies of patients with acquired musical anhedonia have involved lesions to the right temporoparietal area, the left insula and amygdala, the right inferior parietal lobe, the right superior temporal lobe, and the right hemisphere putamen. These patients experiencing acquired musical anhedonia displayed not only a loss of derived pleasure from music listening, but a reduced or absent emotional response to music.

== Neural correlates ==
Neuroimaging studies have found that musical anhedonia may be associated with a reduction or disruption in the structural and functional connections between the auditory cortex and subcortical reward network.

An fMRI study demonstrated that participants with musical anhedonia exhibited a selective reduction of activity for music in the nucleus accumbens (NAcc), as opposed to non-musical reward stimuli, and decreased functional connectivity between the right auditory cortex and ventral striatum, specifically the right superior temporal gyrus (STG) and nucleus accumbens, without any changes in frontotemporal circuits during music listening. This is further supported by an anatomical neuroimaging study into the white matter connectivity of a case study with severe musical anhedonia, with the study showing that individual differences in music reward sensitivity is associated with white matter tract integrity connecting the superior temporal gyrus and nucleus accumbens.

== History ==
Reports of musical anhedonia and its symptoms date back to the first documented case of musical anhedonia in 1993 reporting a patient with a lesion to the right temporoparietal area complaining of a lack of appreciation and emotion in music despite maintaining the ability to assess structural aspects of music, such as identifying rhythm, melody, and harmony.

The term "musical anhedonia" was first used in 2011 to describe the selective loss in emotional responses to music following damage to the brain. It has now come to mean, more generally, a selective lack of pleasurable responses to music in individuals with or without brain damage.

== See also ==
- Music-specific disorders
- Amusia
- Auditory agnosia
- Music and emotion
- Neuroscience of music
