= Cajsa S. Lund =

Swedish music archaeologist and prehistorian (born 1940)

- Born: Cajsa Christina Desirée Stomberg Lund; 23 May 1940 (age 86)
- Occupations: Music archaeologist; prehistorian

Cajsa Christina Desirée Stomberg Lund (born 23 May 1940) is a Swedish music archaeologist and prehistorian, who pioneered the study of sound and music in the archaeological record.

== Biography ==
Lund was born on 23 May 1940 is the daughter of director Sven Stomberg and Ester Ohlson. She studied bassoon and saxophone at the music conservatories in Malmö and Lund from 1960 to 1965. Lund has worked as a bassoonist at the Malmö Symphony Orchestra (1965–1971), as assistant at Stockholm Music Museum's National Inventory (1976–1982), as a research assistant at the Royal Swedish Academy of Music (1983–1986) and was subsequently a music producer at Rikskonserter. She was one of the founders and secretaries of the Study Group for Music Archeology within the International Council for Traditional Music, which was funded by UNESCO. She has held several international assignments as a music archaeological editor, including for Musikgeschichte in Bildern and written about 30 scientific articles in international journals. As of 2021 she was the research lead on the European Music Archaeology Project.

In the 1970s, Lund began to search for and classify what she termed "sound tools"—objects in museum collections which could be used to create sound. She developed a classification system for these objects to determine the likelihood that a particular object was used to create sound. One of her favourite sound-producing objects is the 'buzz bone'. Her work has influenced artists, including Ruth Ewan.

In 1989, she worked on the interpretation of musical finds which were found in the wreck of the Swedish flagship Kronan.

== Selected publications ==
=== Articles ===
- 'Early Ringing Stones in Scandinavia – Finds and Traditions, Questions and Problems' in Studia instrumentorum musicae popularis (2009).
- 'Prehistoric Soundscapes in Scandinavia' in Sounds of History: Reports by the University of Lund (2008).
- 'Bone Flutes in Västergötland, Sweden. Finds and Traditions. A Music-Archaeological Study' in Acta Musicologica (1985).
- 'A Swedish Bone Clarinet' in The Galpin Society Journal (1983).
- 'A Medieval Tongue-(Lip-)and-Duct Flute' in The Galpin Society Journal (1981).
- 'The Archaeomusicology of Scandinavia' in World Archaeology (1981).
- 'Methoden und Probleme der nordischen Musikarchäologie' in Acta Musicologica (1980).

=== Discography ===
- LP: Fornnordiska klanger (1984).

== Awards and honours ==
- In 2019, she was awarded the Medal for the Promotion of Music.
- In 2015 an international conference was held in her honour in Växjö.
- In 2020 a festschrift was published to celebrate her contributions to music archaeology - The Archaeology of Sound, Acoustics and Music: Studies in Honour of Cajsa S. Lund.
