= Egomania =

Psychiatric term

Egomania is a psychiatric term used to describe excessive preoccupation with one's ego, identity or self and applies the same preoccupation to anyone who follows one's own ungoverned impulses, is possessed by delusions of personal greatness & grandeur and feels a lack of appreciation. Someone suffering from this extreme egocentric focus is an egomaniac. Egomania as a condition, while not a classified personality disorder, is considered psychologically abnormal.

The term "egomania" is often used by laypersons in a pejorative fashion to describe an individual who is perceived as intolerably self-centered. Narcissistic personality disorder is the clinical condition that most resembles and is most often associated with this definition and usage of the term, though the two differ vastly according to the individual's responses to others.

== History ==
Egomania was brought into polemical prominence at the end of the 19th century by Max Nordau, one of the first critics who perceived the centrality of the concept of egoism for an understanding of Modernism, with criticism on the ideology of egomania. Nordau distinguished egoism from the egomania. He described egoism as a lack of amiability while maintaining the ability to look after oneself, and egomania as a condition where one does not see things as they are, does not understand the world, and cannot take up a right attitude towards it. Nordau's attack was aimed at the avant-garde of the fin de siècle. He describes the self-proclaimed geniuses as criminals & madmen obsessed with culte du moi (the cult of self).

Over a century later, the term egomania re-appeared with a positive gloss to mark the post-modern quest for success and celebrity. "Self-confidence is the key to all success..." By contrast, reticent personalities may be labelled: it may well be a form of egomania, if you aren't willing to take a chance".

== Substance abuse ==
Egomania has also been linked with alcoholism.

A recovering alcoholic may well look back at the past as "the land of self-loathing, egomania, and decay".

Additionally, addiction can also be significantly influenced by egotism. Unquestionably, the detrimental psychological traits of the substance abusers are a precedent to behaviours such as excessive alcohol and drug use. These individuals turn to alcohol or drugs as a coping mechanism in place of alternate methods of dealing with negative feelings, such as sadness and anxiety.

The danger with the egomaniac is always that 'underneath the apparent over-confidence and bravado lies a fragile personality', driven by "grandiose fantasies of boundless success or power or perfect love" which cannot be fulfilled.

== See also ==
- Egotism
- Mania
- -mania (suffix)
- Narcissism
- Omnipotence
