= Theory of musical equilibration =

The theory of musical equilibration (in German: die strebetendenz-theorie or, literally, the tendency to strive theory) is a psychological theory that argues that music does not elicit emotion directly and that, instead, the listener "identifies with musically-encoded processes of will" and interprets them to produce an emotional effect. The theory is rooted in concepts introduced in music theorist Ernst Kurth's Musikpsychologie, except that it proposes that listeners identify with a desire to avoid the resolution of leading-notes. The theory was first proposed in 1997 by German music theorist, Bernd Willimek, who further developed it with his wife and fellow theorist, Daniela Willimek. Between 1997 and 2012, the pair conducted a series of studies throughout the world in which they asked more than 2000 children and young adults to identify the emotional aspects of certain musical compositions. Results of the study indicated that participants interpreted the link between harmony and emotional effect similarly, with answers matching around 86% of the time.

== Overview ==
Bernd Willimek initially explored the idea of musical equilibration in his 1987 thesis, Das musikalische Raumphänomen (The musical space phenomenon). The thesis was based on concepts introduced in Ernst Kurth's 1931 book, Musikpsychologie. In that book, Kurth hypothesizes that music is first physically experienced and must undergo an "internal translation" before listeners can perceive the frequencies as music. Kurth suggested that listeners can identify the physical potential energy of the music using "pure feeling". Willimek challenged that idea by suggesting that listeners identify with musically encoded processes of the will (or volitional content) in the music rather than physical potential energy. He also noted that listeners identify with a desire to keep leading notes unchanged. This again differs from Kurth's hypothesis, which suggested that there are "pulling forces" between notes that elicit changes in pitch. Willimek first presented the theory during lectures at the Karlsruhe University of Music and the University of Rostock in 1997. The theory was published for the first time in 1998.

Beginning in 1997, Bernd Willimek and his wife and fellow theorist, Daniela Willimek, further developed the theory. The primary idea behind the theory of musical equilibration is that music itself cannot produce an emotional effect but that listeners can identify with the abstract volitional content of the music to derive emotion. Different chords can produce different emotional reactions depending on the volitional content that is present. For instance, a major tonic chord often causes listeners to identify cheerfulness whereas a minor tonic chord might cause them to interpret the tones as sad (when played softly) or angry (when played loudly).

== International studies ==
In 1997, the Willimeks devised a test that they would ultimately administer to over 2,100 schoolchildren and young adults throughout the world over the next 15 years. Known as the "Rocky Test", it asked participants to match musical selections with eight scenes from the fairy tale, Sleeping Beauty and Prince Rocky. Each musical selection used chords meant to convey a particular emotion. These include: astonishment (augmented chord), a feeling of forward motion (dominant), weightlessness (whole tone scale), despair (diminished seventh chord), courage (natural minor), emotional warmth (added sixth in a major subdominant), a wistful farewell (subdominant with a major seventh) and loneliness (added sixth in a minor subdominant). Students from Germany, Austria (including members of the Vienna Boys' Choir), Thailand, Japan, and China participated in the study with results matching 86% of the time. The test was also administered to students at German schools in Sydney, Rio de Janeiro, Helsinki, and Stockholm.

The two researchers also developed a second test known as the "Basic Test" in which they asked schoolchildren to match chords with basic emotional concepts (rather than scenes in a fairy tale). In this test, the answers matched 92% of the time. Results of these studies were published in a 2011 book entitled Music and Emotions: Research on the Theory of Musical Equilibration. The book was translated into English in 2013. An updated German-language version of the book was published in 2019 via Deutscher Wissenschafts-Verlag. This research has also been used in further studies on music and emotional recognition, music therapy, declarative memory, and consciousness (among other topics).
