= Echolocation =

Echolocation is the use of sound as a form of navigation.

== Navigation using sound ==
- Acoustic location, the general use of sound to locate objects.
  - Animal echolocation, non-human animals emitting sound waves and listening to the echo in order to locate objects or navigate.
  - Human echolocation, the use of sound by people to navigate.
  - Sound localization, biological process of locating a sound.
  - Sonar (sound navigation and ranging), the technology that uses sound on water or underwater, to navigate or to locate other watercraft, usually by submarines.
  - Echo sounding, listening to the echo of sound pulses to measure the distance to the bottom of the sea, a special case of Sonar.
  - Medical ultrasonography, the use of ultrasound echoes to look inside the body.

== Other ==
- Echolocation (album), a 2001 album by Fruit Bats
- Echolocation, a 2017 album by Gone Is Gone

== See also ==
- Radar, locating objects by detecting the echo of emitted radio waves
- Lidar, locating objects by detecting the echo of emitted laser beams
- Time to Echolocate, a 2005 album by The Ebb and Flow
