= Micromania =

Micromania may refer to:

- Micromania (video game retailer), a French video game retailer
- Micromanía, a Spanish computer game magazine
- "Micromania", a song by Romina Contiero
- Micromania (moth), a synonym of the moth genus Anthracia
