= International Study Group on Music Archaeology =

- Company type: Study group
- Genre: Music archaeology
- Founded: 1998
- Headquarters: German Archaeological Institute, Berlin, Germany; Ethnological Museum (Berlin), Berlin, Germany
- Number of locations: 2
- Parent: German Archaeological Institute
- Website: http://www.musicarchaeology.org

The International Study Group on Music Archaeology (ISGMA) is a study group of researchers who carry out research in the field of music archaeology.
