= Anton Ehrenzweig =

Anton Ehrenzweig (27 November 1908 – 5 December 1966) was an Austrian-born British theorist on modern art and modern music.

Ehrenzweig was born into an eminent Jewish legal family in Vienna with Czech and Galician roots. He was the son of Emma (née Bachrach) from Neuhaus in Southern Bohemia and Albert Rudolf Ehrenzweig, who was born in Vienna. His paternal grandfather and grandmother were from Lipník nad Bečvou (Leipnik) in Moravia and Lemberg, Galicia (now Lviv, Ukraine), respectively.

He studied law, psychology and art in Austria and became a magistrate in 1936. He fled Austria immediately after the Anschluss with Germany in 1938 and settled in England with his brother (Albert Ehrenzweig) and parents following him later that year. In 1940 he was interned by the British authorities as an enemy alien & transported to Australia. He (along with all other Jewish internees) was released in 1942. He abandoned his law career after returning to London while his brother who left for America in 1939 started an entirely new career there in the Common Law and became an eminent Conflicts of Laws professor at Berkeley California. After working at the Central School of Arts & Crafts in Holborn London Anton Ehrenzweig eventually became a lecturer in Art Education at Goldsmiths College, University of London. He devoted his life's work to the study of the creative mind. Ehrenzweig had an instinct for recognizing upcoming artists when they were unknown and during his career he helped and advised Eduardo Paolozzi, Bridget Riley and Alan Davie among other artists.

Ehrenzweig wrote The Psychoanalysis of Artistic Vision and Hearing (1953) and The Hidden Order of Art (1967). Ehrenzweig also published numerous journal articles. His ideas can be summarized as the discovery of the organizing role of the unconscious mind in any act of creativity and an analysis of the layered structure of the unconscious mind and of the dynamic mental processes which an artist undergoes in the creative act.

The Hidden Order of Art, published posthumously, has been in continuous publication since 1967, and is considered one of the three classics of art psychology, along with Rudolf Arnheim's Art and Visual Perception and Herschel Chipp's Theories of Modern Art.

Ehrenzweig wrote the introduction to the catalogue for an early show by Bridget Riley at London's Gallery One, May 1962. He also reviewed one of her exhibitions for "Art International" in February 1965. He died the following year in Hammersmith, London, of a sudden heart attack.

He was survived by his wife, Gerda Hiller, whom he married in 1942. They had one child Anthony Ehrenzweig born 1945.

Sir Herbert Read commented on Ehrenzweig's contribution following his death:

The Psychoanalysis of Artistic Vision and Hearing ... advanced an original theory of the part played by-unconscious modes of perception in the creation of the work of art. Essentially a merging of Freudian psycho-analysis and Gestalt psychology, this thesis established the importance of the interplay that takes place between our conscious and formal creation of images and our undisciplined perceptive imagination. The book combines a profound knowledge of modern psychology with an equally profound knowledge of all the arts, particularly painting and music. It has had a great influence in the explanation and justification of the extreme types of modern art, and has been a direct inspiration to many artists.

== Literature ==
- Ehrenzweig, Anton (1967). The Hidden Order of Art. University of California Press. ISBN 9780520038455.
- Ehrenzweig, Anton (1999) [1965]. The Psycho-analysis of Artistic Vision and Hearing: An Introduction to a Theory of Unconscious Perception. Psychology Press. ISBN 9780415209564.
