= Music archaeology =

Interdisciplinary study field

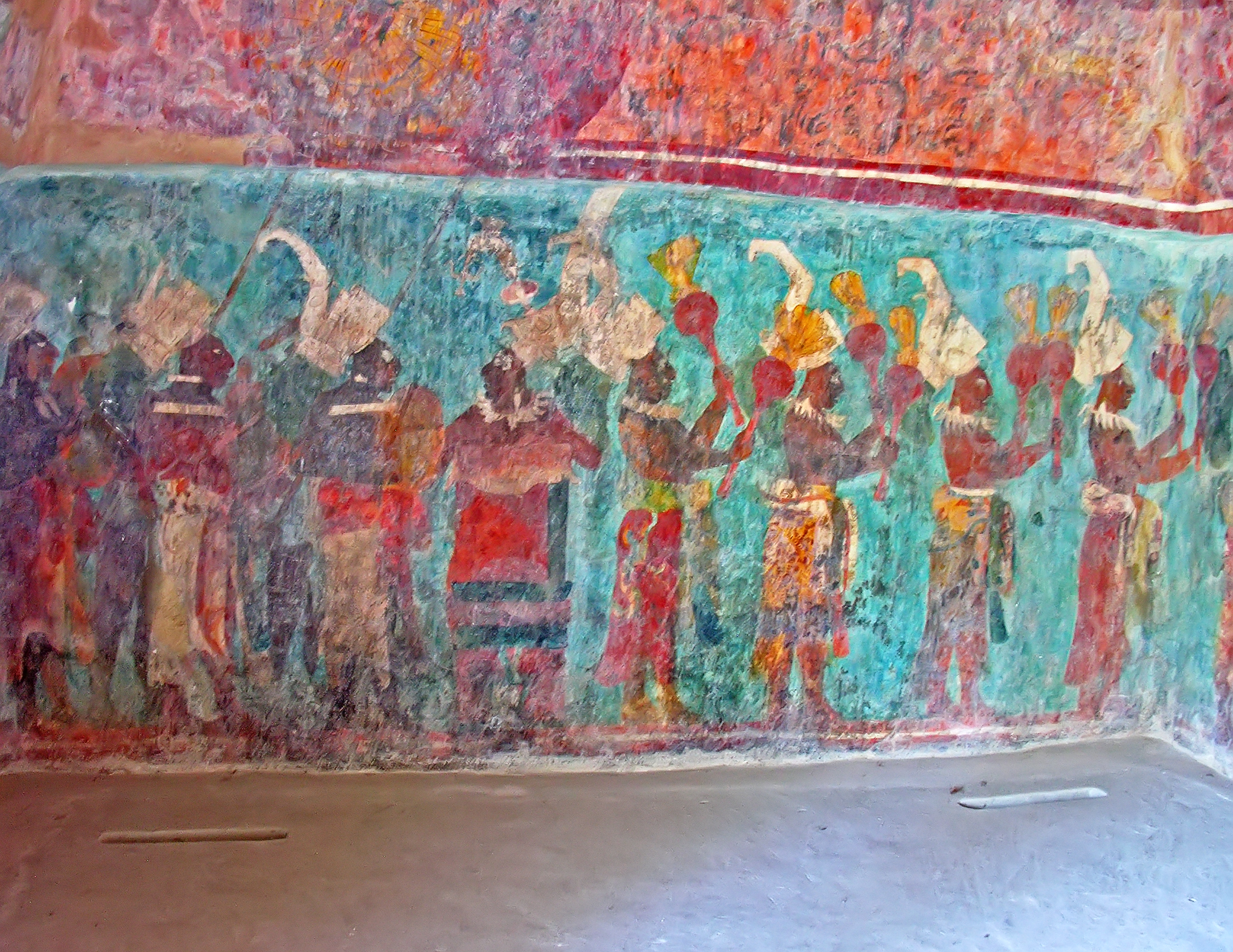
Performers in procession, Bonampak temple room 1.

Music archaeology is an interdisciplinary field of study that combines musicology and archaeology. As it includes the study of music from various cultures, it is often considered to be a subfield of ethnomusicology.

== Definitions ==
According to music archaeologist Adje Both, "In its broadest sense, music archaeology is the study of the phenomenon of past musical behaviours and sounds." Music archaeologists often combine methods from musicology and archaeology. A theoretical and methodological foundation has yet to be established, and remains one of the main areas of interest for the international community of researchers.

Research goals in the field include the study of artifacts relevant to the reconstruction of ancient music, such as sound-producing devices, representations of musical scenes, and textual evidence. The archaeological analysis and documentation of such artifacts, including their dating, description, and analysis of their origin and cultural context, can improve understanding of the usage of an instrument and can sometimes enable reconstruction of functional replicas. Textual study may involve the investigation of early musical notations and literary sources.

The field has also expanded to include neurophysiological, biological, and psychological research examining the prerequisites for music production in humans.

== History ==
One of the first attempts to join the two distinct disciplines of musicology and archaeology took place at the conference of the International Musicological Society at Berkeley in 1977. One of the round tables was designated "Music and Archaeology", to which were invited specialists to discuss the musical remains of ancient cultures: Bathia Bayer (Israel), Charles Boilès (Mexico), Ellen Hickmann (Egypt), David Liang (China), Cajsa S. Lund (Sweden). The main stimulus for this session was the sensational discovery of an ancient Mesopotamian musical system by Anne D. Kilmer, an Assyriologist in Berkeley. On the basis of this discovery, excavated from Ugarit, she was able to advance a decipherment and transcription into Western notation of a late Bronze Age hymn in the Hurrian language, which contained notation based on the Mesopotamian system. Prior to the conference a replica of a Sumerian lyre had been made, with the help of musicologist Richard L. Crocker (Berkeley) and instrument maker Robert Brown, and Kilmer's version of the Hurrian hymn had been recorded and released, accompanied by a carefully prepared commentary, as Sounds from Silence: Recent Discoveries in Ancient Near Eastern Music (LP with information booklet, Bit Enki Publications, Berkeley, 1976). At the round table in Berkeley, Kilmer explained their method of reconstruction and demonstrated the resulting sound. This was the starting point of the ICTM Study Group on Music Archaeology, officially founded within the International Council for Traditional Music (ICTM) in Seoul/Korea in 1981, and recognized by the ICTM in New York in 1983 following its first meeting on current music-archaeological research in Cambridge/UK in 1982.

The ICTM Study Group on Music Archaeology went on to hold international conferences in Stockholm (1984), Hannover/Wolfenbüttel (1986), Saint Germain-en-Laye (1990), Liège (1992), Istanbul (1993), Jerusalem (1994/1995, together with the ICTM-Study Group for Iconography), and Limassol, Cyprus (1996). These meetings resulted in comprehensive conference reports.

The International Study Group on Music Archaeology (ISGMA) has been founded by Ellen Hickmann and Ricardo Eichmann in 1998. The Study Group emerged from the ICTM Study Group on Music Archaeology with the objective to obtain closer cooperation with archaeologists. Since then, the ISGMA has worked continuously with the German Archaeological Institute, Berlin (DAI, Deutsches Archäologisches Institut, Berlin). A new series called "Studien zur Musikarchäologie" was created as a sub-series of "Orient-Archäologie" to present the conference reports of the ISGMA, and to integrate music-archaeological monographs independent of the Study Group's meetings; it is published by the Orient Department of the DAI through the Verlag Marie Leidorf. Between 1998 and 2004, conferences of ISGMA were held every two years at Michaelstein Monastery, Music Academy of Sachsen-Anhalt (Kloster Michaelstein, Landesmusikakademie Sachsen-Anhalt), sponsored by the German Research Foundation (DFG, Deutsche Forschungsgemeinschaft).

In close cooperation with the Department for Ethnomusicology at the Ethnological Museum of Berlin (Ethnologisches Museum Berlin, SMB SPK, Abteilung Musikethnologie, Medien-Technik und Berliner Phonogramm-Archiv), the 5th and 6th Symposium of the ISGMA were held in 2006 respectively in 2008 at the Ethnological Museum of Berlin. In friendly cooperation with the Tianjin Conservatory of Music, the 7th Symposium of the ISGMA was held in Tianjin, China, in 2010. The 8th Symposium of the ISGMA (2012) was also held in China, in Suzhou and Beijing; three more symposiums have been held since then, with Germany and China continuing to alternate as hosts.

The ICTM Study Group on Music Archaeology continued to develop separately and hold its own events, although a number of researchers remained involved in both groups. After a couple of years of inactivity, Julia L. J. Sanchez re-established the Study Group in 2003 on the initiative of Anthony Seeger, beginning with meetings in Los Angeles, California (2003), and Wilmington, North Carolina (2006). These were followed by a joint-conference in New York (2009), the 11th of the Study Group since its foundation in 1981 (also the 12th Conference of the Research Center for Music Iconography). The 12th conference was then held in Valladolid, Spain (2011), which was the largest meeting of the ICTM Study Group to date, followed by the 13th Symposium of the Study Group held in Guatemala in 2013. Also in 2013, a new print series was launched, Publications of the ICTM Study Group on Music Archaeology, published through Ekho Verlag.

On 27 May 2011, a public concert under the banner of Palaeophonics, funded by the Arts and Humanities Research Council (AHRC) Beyond Text programme and the University of Edinburgh Campaign, took place at the George Square Theatre in Edinburgh. The event showcased the outcomes of collaborative research and creative practice by archaeologists, composers, filmmakers, and performers from across Europe and the Americas. Whilst inspired and driven by research in music archaeology, Palaeophonics represents the emergence of a new, possibly significant, development within the field and within musicology which approaches the subject through the production and performance of new sound- and music-based multi-media creative works instead of through direct representation and reproduction. Described by some observers as "experimental" and "avant-garde", the event provoked mixed feedback from a public audience of around 250 people.

In 2013, the European Music Archaeology Project (EMAP) was funded by the EU funding programme EACEA, for a period of five years. The project developed a touring exhibition on ancient music in Europe and an elaborate concert and event program.

== Approaches ==
Music archaeology is an interdisciplinary field with multifaceted approaches, falling under the cross section of experimental archaeology and musicology research. Music archaeology research aims to understand past musical behaviors; this may be done through methods such as recreating past musical performances, or reconstructing musical instruments from the past.

A common research approach for an interdisciplinary field is to develop a collaborative research team with diverse specialists who can offer varying perspectives on data and findings. Music archaeology research teams are frequently composed of musicologists and archaeologists. In addition, specialists such as psychologists, organologists, biologists, chemists, and historians can be key in understanding past musical behaviors. For example, a human physiologist can help provide useful insight on singing and tonal capabilities when analysing excavated human remains. In pursuit of achieving accurate results, it is important that all sources of information and data, regardless of how they are reported or recorded, are treated equally. The information obtained from various scientific approaches can deepen the interpretation of past musical behaviors, sound artefacts, and acoustic spaces. Archaeological researchers date and classify findings from digs to better understand past behaviors; both dating and classifying are equally important when interpreting data.

== Notable music archaeologists ==
- Graeme Lawson
- Ellen Hickmann
- Cajsa Lund
- Bo Lawergren
- Anne D. Kilmer
- Ricardo Eichmann
- Arnd Adje Both
- Stefan Hagel
- Peter Holmes
- John C. Franklin

== Networks ==
The ICTM Study Group on Music Archaeology was founded in the early 1980s. In 2013, the book series Publications of the ICTM Study Group on Music Archaeology was launched.

The International Study Group on Music Archaeology (ISGMA) was founded in 1998. The study group is hosted at the Orient Department of the German Archaeological Institute Berlin (DAI, Deutsches Archäologisches Institut, Orient-Abteilung) and the Department for Ethnomusicology at the Ethnological Museum Berlin (Ethnologisches Museum Berlin, SMB SPK, Abteilung Musikethnologie, Medien-Technik und Berliner Phonogramm-Archiv).

MOISA: The International Society for the Study of Greek and Roman Music and its Cultural Heritage is a non-profit association incorporated in Italy in 2007 for the preservation, interpretation, and valorization of ancient Greek and Roman music and musical theory, as well as its cultural heritage to the present day.

The Acoustics and Music of British Prehistory Research Network was funded by the Arts and Humanities Research Council and Engineering and Physical Sciences Research Council, led by Rupert Till and Chris Scarre, as well as Professor Jian Kang of Sheffield University's Department of Architecture. The network maintains a list of researchers working in the field, as well as links to many other relevant sites.

== Gallery ==
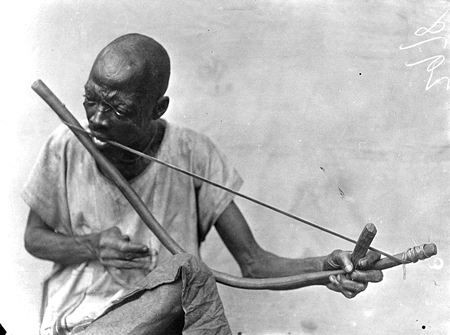
Man playing traditional Music bow. One of the oldest stringed instruments.

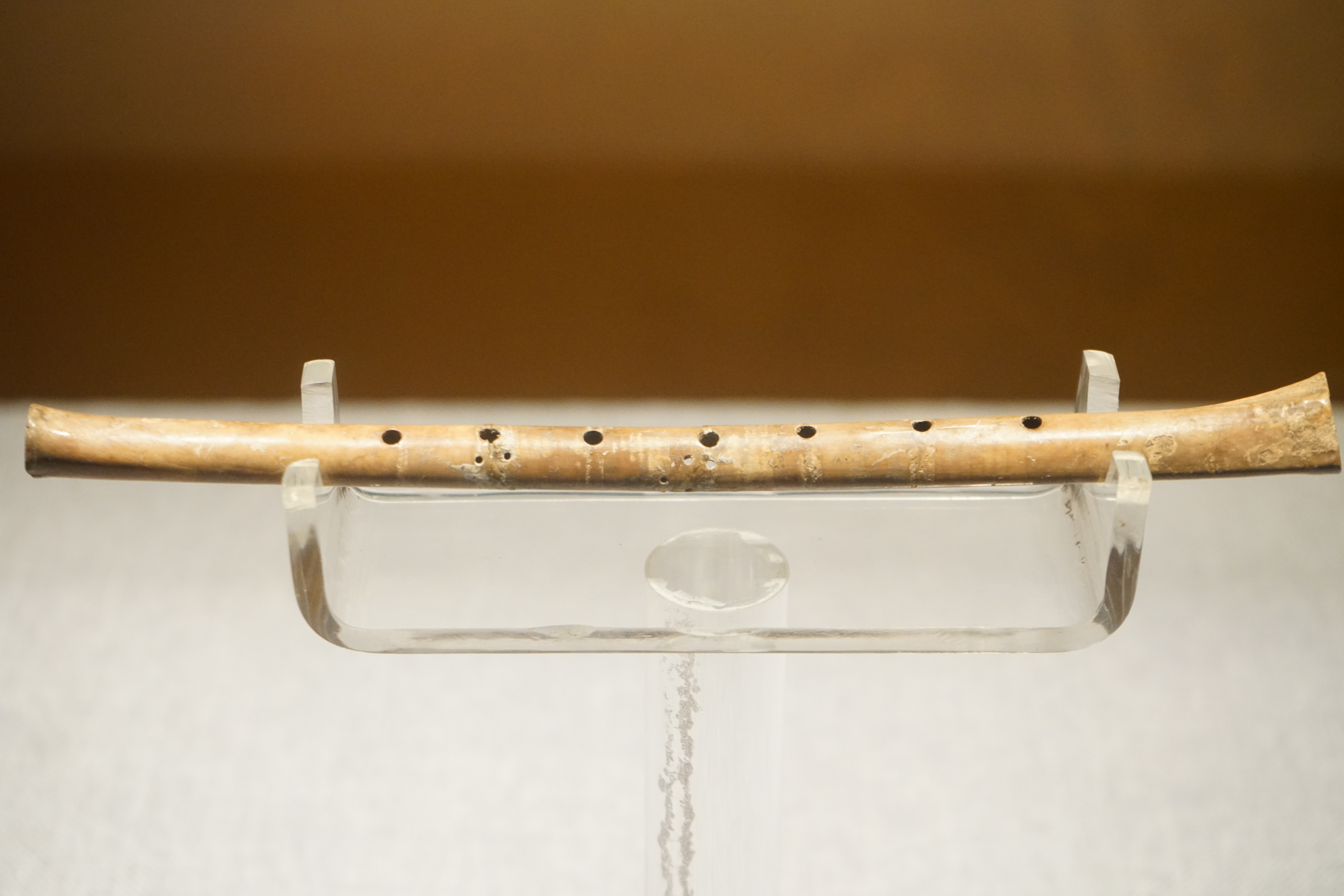
Bone Flutes are some of the oldest remaining musical instruments.

== See also ==
- History of music
- Organology
- Music-specific disorders
- Music history
- List of musicology topics
