= High Renaissance =

Period of the most exceptional artistic production during the Italian Renaissance

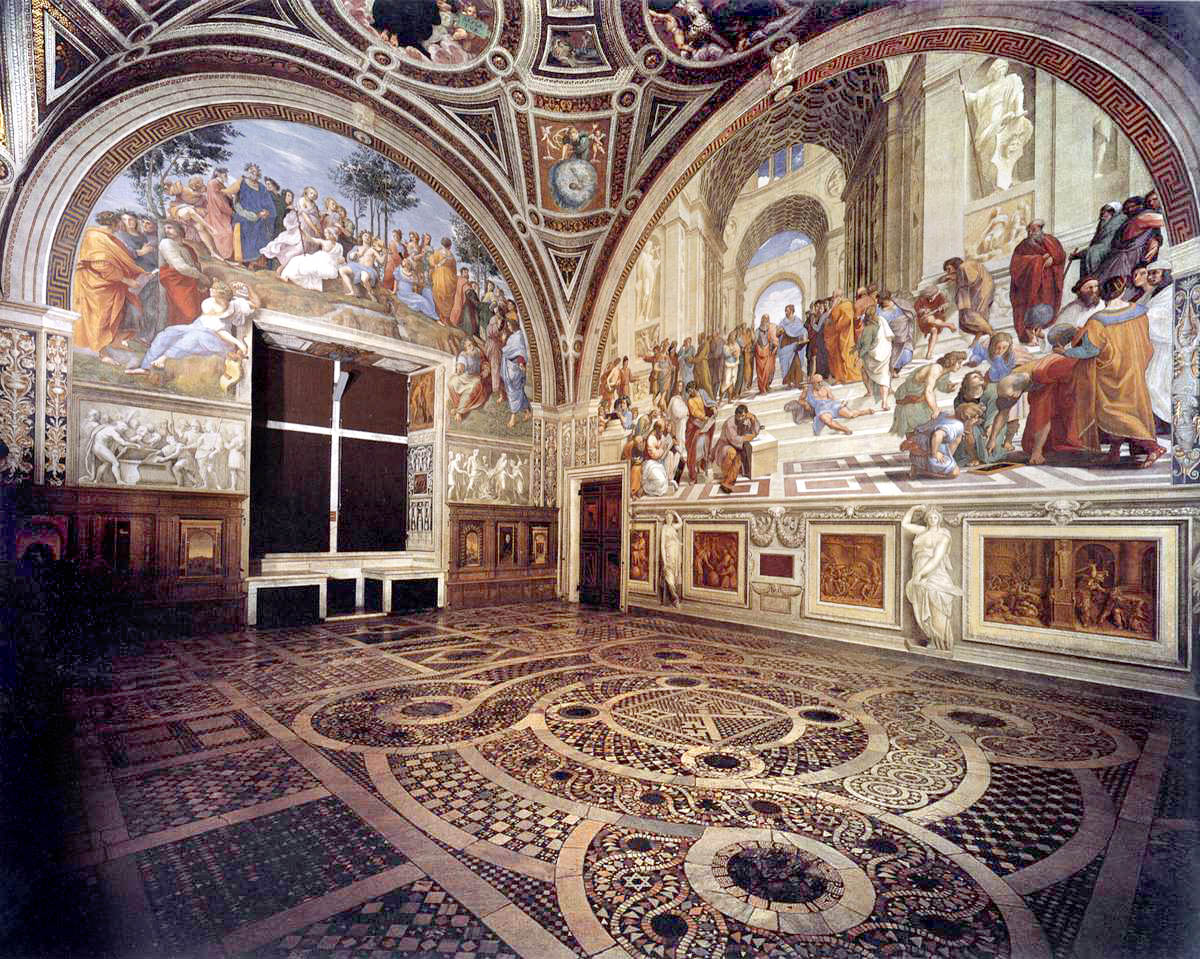
Raphael's frescos in the Raphael Rooms of the Apostolic Palace in the Vatican, commissioned by Pope Julius II.

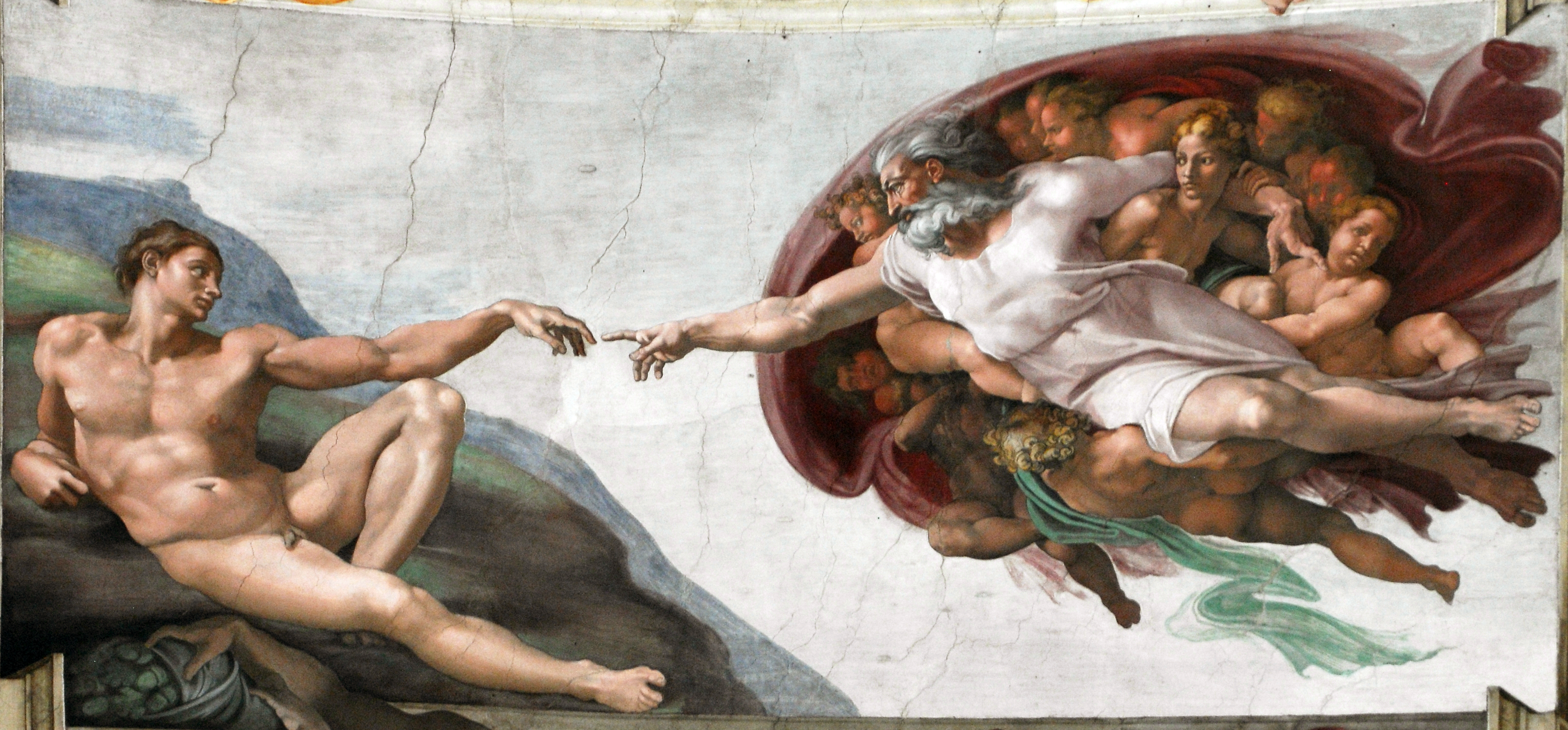
The Creation of Adam, a scene from Michelangelo's Sistine Chapel ceiling (c. 1508–1512), also commissioned by Pope Julius II.

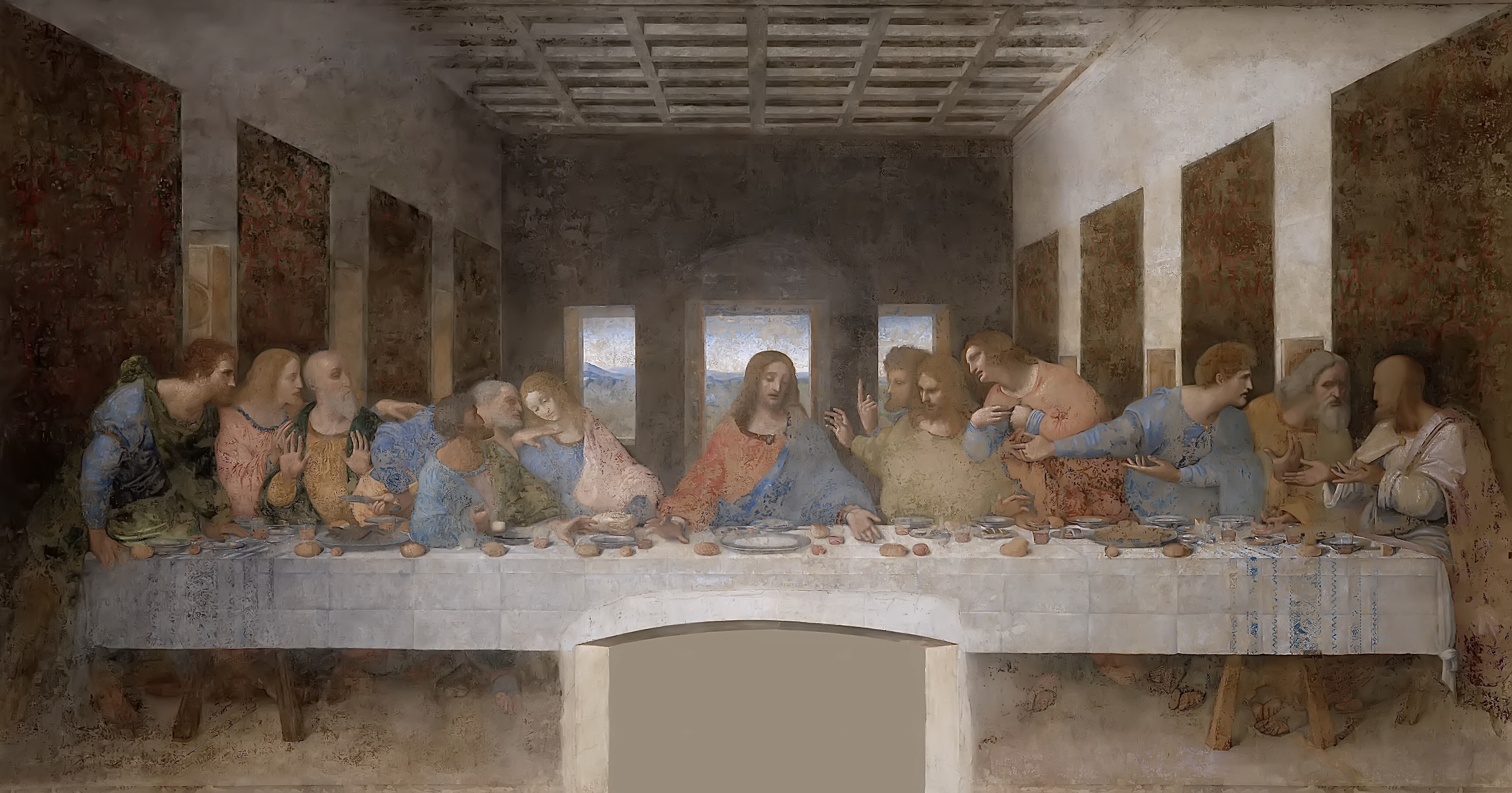
The Last Supper, mural painting by Leonardo da Vinci.

In art history, the High Renaissance was a short period of the most exceptional artistic production in the Italian states, particularly Rome, capital of the Papal States, and in Florence, during the Italian Renaissance. Most art historians state that the High Renaissance started between 1490 and 1500, and ended in 1520 with the death of Raphael, although some say it ended around 1525, in 1527 with the Sack of Rome by the mutinous army of Charles V, Holy Roman Emperor, or around 1530.

The best-known exponents of painting, sculpture, and architecture of the High Renaissance include Leonardo da Vinci, Michelangelo, Raphael, and Bramante. In the 21st century, use of the term has been frequently criticized by some art historians for oversimplifying artistic developments, ignoring historical context, and focusing only on a few iconic works.

== Origin of term ==
The art historian Jill Burke was the first to trace the historical origins of the term High Renaissance. It was first coined in German by Jacob Burckhardt (Hochrenaissance) in 1855 and has its origins in the "High Style" of painting and sculpture of the time period around the early 16th century described by Johann Joachim Winckelmann in 1764. Extending the general rubric of Renaissance culture, the visual arts of the High Renaissance were marked by a renewed emphasis upon the classical tradition, the expansion of networks of patronage, and a gradual attenuation of figural forms into the style later termed Mannerism.

== Time period ==
Most art historians place the start of the High Renaissance in the 1490s or early 1500s. In contrast to most other art historians, Manfred Wundram suggests the High Renaissance was heralded by Leonardo's Adoration of the Magi of 1481, for which only the underpainting was completed. Alexander Rauch suggests it began as early as 1490, while Marilyn Stokstad and Jacob Burckhardt state it began at the close of the 15th century. Franz Kugler, who wrote the first "modern" survey text in 1841, and Hugh Honour and John Fleming suggest it began at the start of the 16th century.

Scholars commonly cite Leonardo's The Last Supper as either one of the first works of the High Renaissance or a precursor to it. Frederick Hartt and Christoph Luitpold Frommel mark the painting of this work, which began in 1495 and concluded in 1498, as the start of the period. Another seminal work, Michelangelo's Pietà, was executed between 1498 and 1499, and subsequently housed in St. Peter's Basilica, Vatican City. Hartt suggests The Last Supper completely broke with the Early Renaissance and therefore created the world in which Michelangelo and Raphael worked.

David Piper says that while The Last Supper announced the High Renaissance and was one of the most influential paintings of the period, the High Renaissance began in earnest just after 1500. Similarly, Frommel adds that while Leonardo's painting began it, the period peaked between 1505 and 1513.

Scholars put the end of the period between 1520 and 1530. Hartt, Frommel, Piper, and Wundram indicate that the High Renaissance ended with the death of Raphael in 1520. Honour and Fleming consider the High Renaissance to span the first quarter of the 16th century, meaning it would have ended around 1525. Stokstad and Luigi Lanzi state that it ended with the Sack of Rome in 1527, when several artists were killed and many others dispersed from Rome. Rauch puts the end of the High Renaissance at 1530. Hartt adds that 1520 to 1530 was a transition period between the High Renaissance and Mannerism. Traditionally, the end of the High Renaissance in Florence is marked by the end of the Republic of Florence and the beginning of the Duchy of Florence in 1532.

== Architecture ==
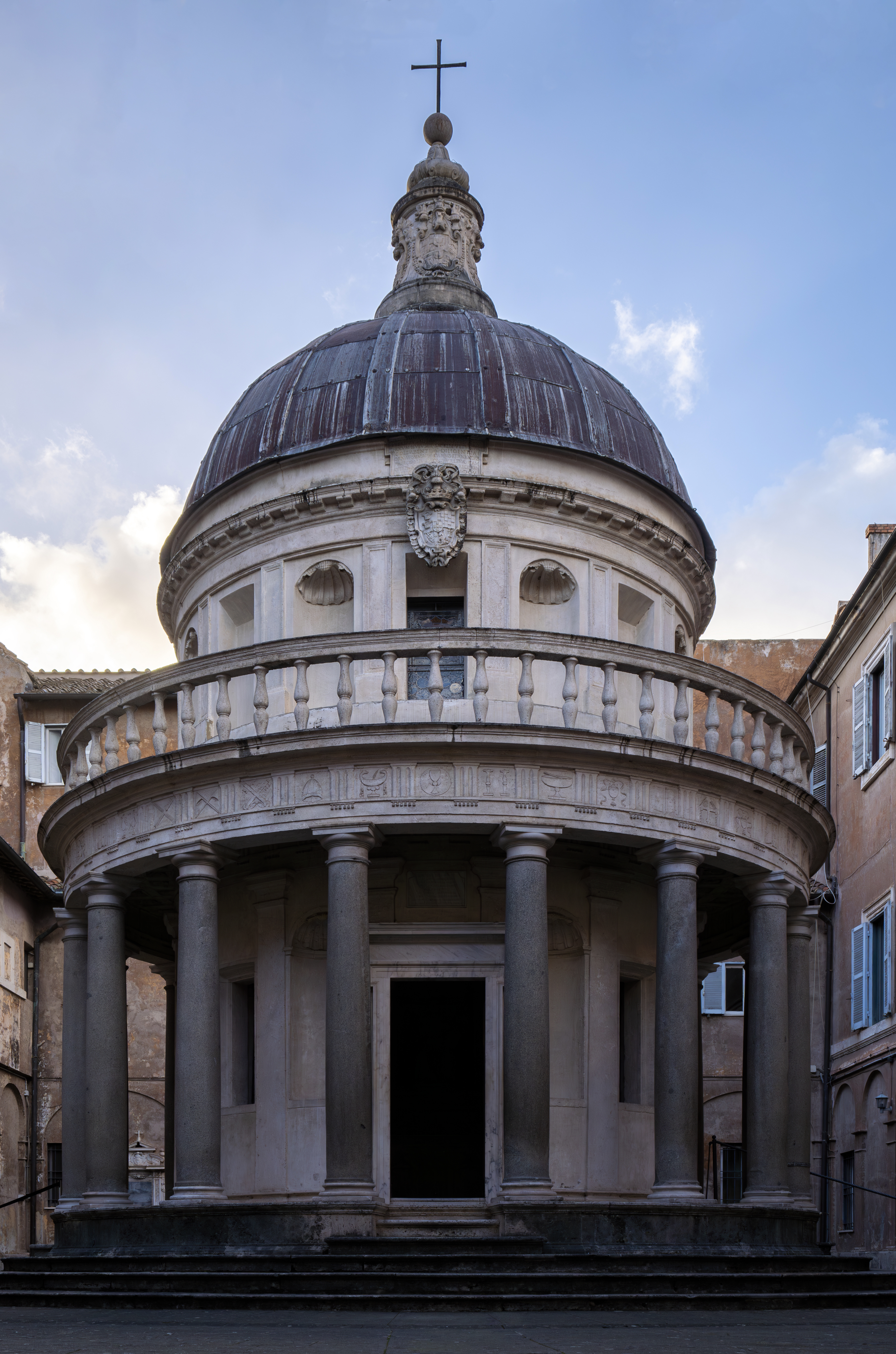
Bramante's Tempietto, designed 1502, San Pietro in Montorio, Rome.

High Renaissance style in architecture conventionally begins with Donato Bramante, whose Tempietto at S. Pietro in Montorio at Rome was begun in 1510. The Tempietto, signifies a full-scale revival of ancient Roman commemorative architecture. David Watkin writes that the Tempietto, like Raphael's works in the Vatican (1509–1511), "is an attempt at reconciling Christian and humanist ideals".

== Painting ==
The High Renaissance of painting was the culmination of the varied means of expression and various advances in painting technique, such as linear perspective, the realistic depiction of both physical and psychological features, and the manipulation of light and darkness, including tone contrast, sfumato (softening the transition between colours) and chiaroscuro (contrast between light and dark), in a single unifying style which expressed total compositional order, balance and harmony. In particular, the individual parts of the painting had a complex but balanced and well-knit relationship to the whole.

Leonardo da Vinci's Mona Lisa or La Gioconda (1503–1505/07) in the Louvre.

Painting of the High Renaissance is considered to be the absolute zenith of western painting and achieved the balancing and reconciliation, in harmony, of contradictory and seemingly mutually exclusive artistic positions, such as real versus ideal, movement versus rest, freedom versus law, space versus plane, and line versus colour. The High Renaissance was traditionally viewed as a great explosion of creative genius, following a model of art history first proposed by the Florentine Giorgio Vasari.

The paintings in the Vatican by Michelangelo and Raphael are said by some scholars such as Sydney J. Freedberg to represent the culmination of High Renaissance style in painting, because of the ambitious scale of these works, coupled with the complexity of their composition, closely observed human figures, and pointed iconographic and decorative references to classical antiquity, can be viewed as emblematic of the High Renaissance.

Even relatively minor painters of the period, such as Fra Bartolomeo and Mariotto Albertinelli, produced works that are still lauded for the harmony of their design and their technique. The elongated proportions and exaggerated poses in the late works of Michelangelo, Andrea del Sarto and Correggio prefigure so-called Mannerism, as the style of the later Renaissance is referred to in art history.

The serene mood and luminous colours of paintings by Giorgione and early Titian exemplify High Renaissance style as practiced in Venice. Other recognizable pieces of this period include Leonardo da Vinci's Mona Lisa and Raphael's The School of Athens. Raphael's fresco, set beneath an arch, is a work of perspective, composition and disegno.

In more recent years, art historians have characterised the High Renaissance as a movement as opposed to a period, one amongst several different experimental attitudes towards art in the late fifteenth and early sixteenth century. This movement is variously characterised as conservative, as reflecting new attitudes towards beauty, a deliberate process of synthesising eclectic models, linked to fashions in literary culture, and reflecting new preoccupations with interpretation and meaning.

== Sculpture ==
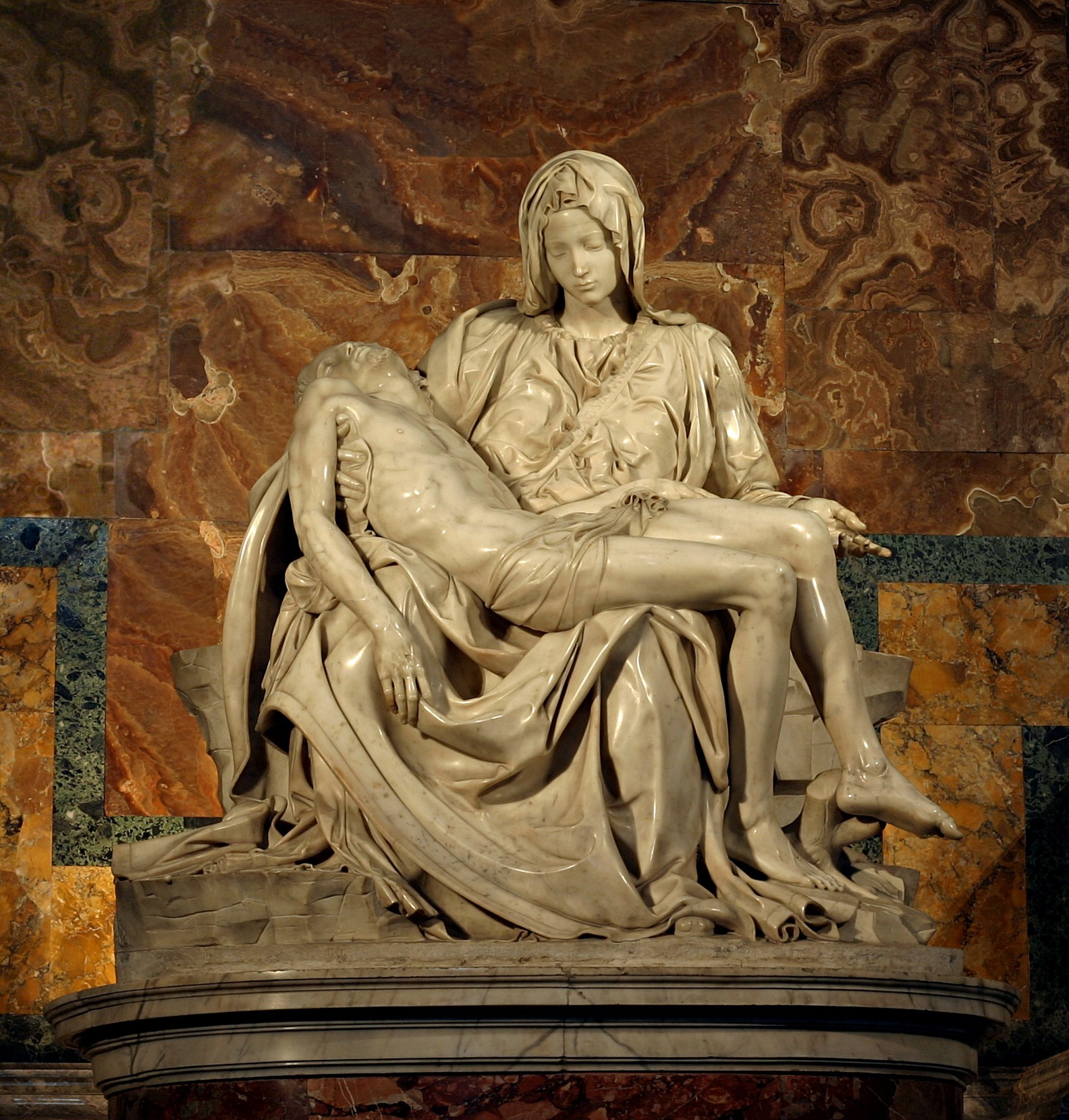
Michelangelo's Pietà, 1498–99.

High Renaissance sculpture, as exemplified by Michelangelo's Pietà sculpture and the iconic David, is characterized by an "ideal" balance between stillness and movement. High Renaissance sculpture was normally commissioned by the public and the state, this becoming more popular for sculpture is an expensive art form. Sculpture was often used to decorate or embellish architecture, normally within courtyards where others were able to study and admire the commissioned art work.

Wealthy individuals like cardinals, rulers, and bankers were the more likely private patrons along with very wealthy families; Pope Julius II also patronized many artists. During the High Renaissance there was the development of small scale statuettes for private patrons, the creation of busts and tombs also developing. The subject matter related to sculpture was mostly religious but also with a significant strand of classical individuals in the form of tomb sculpture and paintings as well as ceilings of cathedrals.
