= Siberian Baroque =

Architectural style

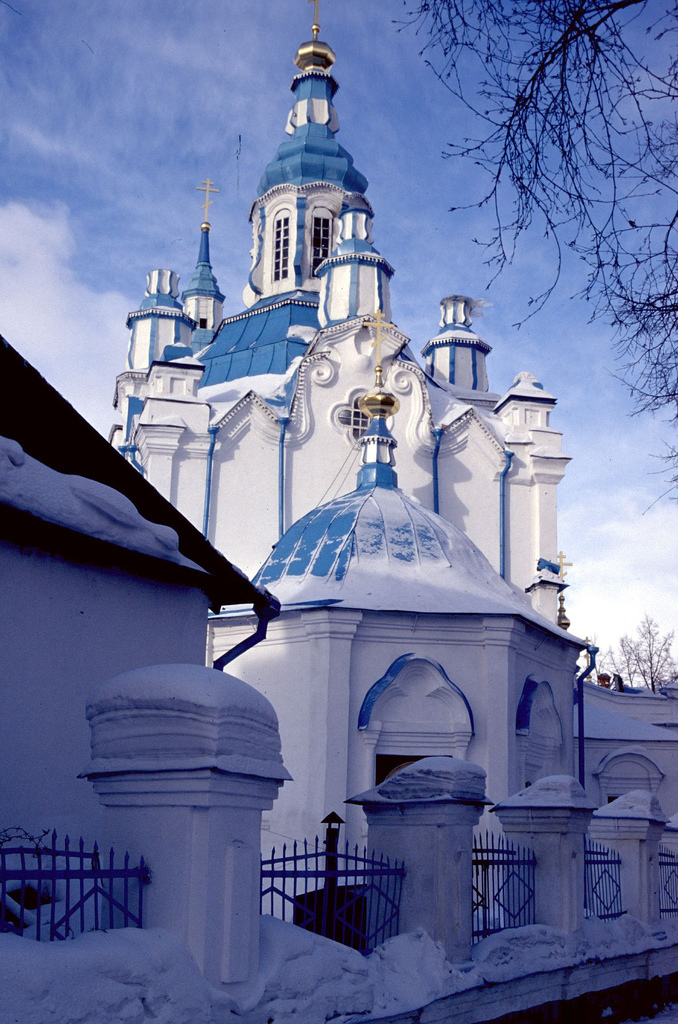
Church of Our Lady of the Sign in Tyumen (1768–86)

Siberian Baroque is an architectural style common for ambitious structures in 18th-century Siberia, where 115 stone churches in Siberia were recorded in 1803, most of which were built in this provincial variant of the Russian Baroque, influenced by the Ukrainian Baroque and in some cases even incorporating lamaist motifs. Most of the buildings were preserved in Irkutsk, Tobolsk and Tomsk. An original interior of a Siberian Baroque structure survives only in the Feast of the Cross Church in Irkutsk.

Siberian churches of the 18th century, like most of Russian and Baroque buildings, are astylar. The refectory and belfries are joined at the western side. Paintings in Siberian Baroque buildings are typically becoming smaller in its dimension (A. Yu. Kaptikov called this technique the "Baroque advanced form"). Decorativelly it features foreign exotic motifs, likely of eastern origin (examples are arrow-shaped and "flaming" cornices, stupa-like forms and dharmacakras).

== History ==
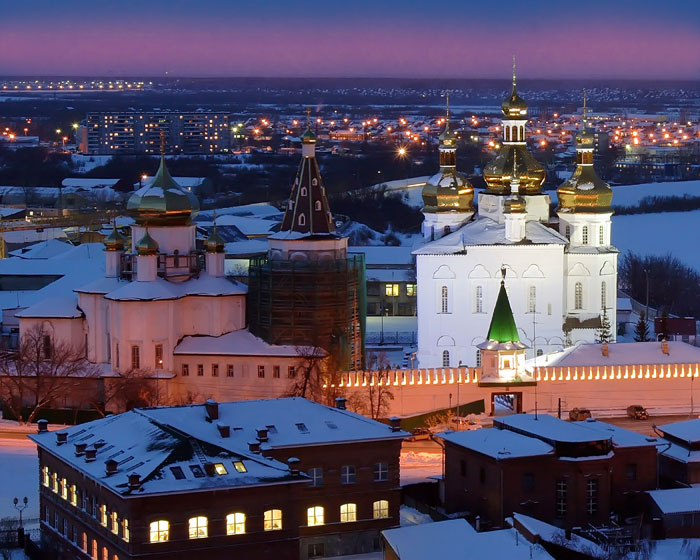
The Holy Trinity monastery in Tyumen is one of the first stone buildings in Siberia.

In the 17th century stone was used in Siberia as a building material only in Tobolsk and Abalak. Those were old Russian buildings with elements of the uzorochye. In the manner of Naryshkin Baroque is the earliest stone building in Tyumen – the Annunciation church (constructed from 1700–04, and destroyed in the Soviet period, it has been under reconstruction). Just thereafter, the Trinity monastery was built mostly in Ukrainian Baroque due likely to the Ukrainian origin of Siberian hierarchs. The next Siberian churches included some remarkable elements of Ukrainian Baroque, for example the vertical-vaulted architecture. Some literature describe the similarity of the earliest Tobolsk monuments with Uralian churches of the very first 18th century, like the Dormition of the Mother of God monastery in Dalmatovo and the cathedral in Verkhoturye (the only one of its type representing Stroganov architecture).

One of the first stone structures on the eastern Siberia includes the Dormition of the Mother of God monastery in Nerchinsk (1712), the Transfiguration of the Saviour in Posolskoye (1718), the church of the Saviour and the Epiphany church, both in Irkutsk, the Epiphany church and the Voyevoda house in Yeniseysk and the Saviour monastery in Yakutsk.

== Research history ==
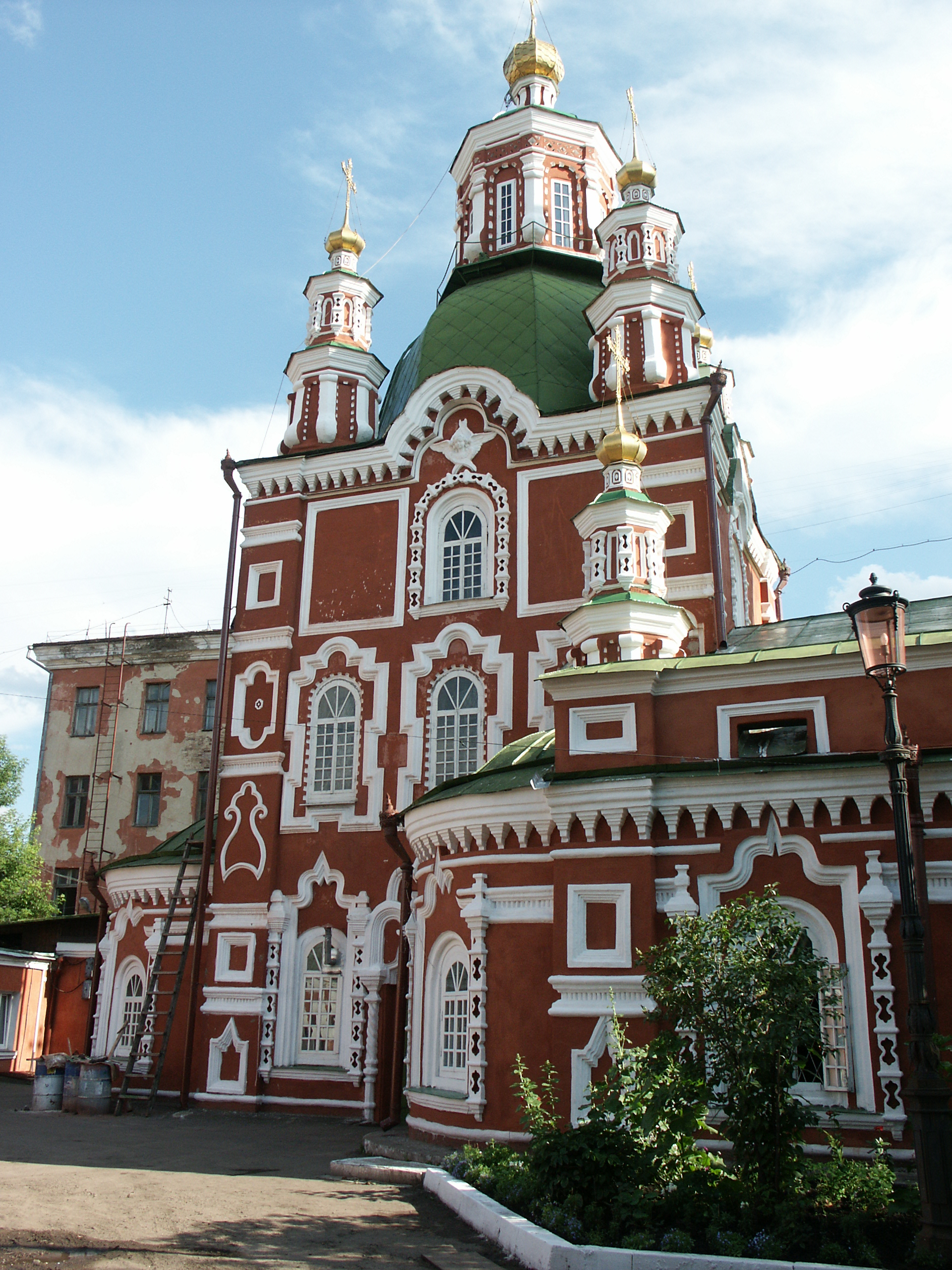
The Intercession church in Krasnoyarsk

The most original monument of Siberian Baroque is the Feast of the Cross church in Irkutsk (1747–1758); "the best example of Siberian Baroque, with its originality in cultural-semantic and ethno-stylistic stratifications". Its Buddhist decors aroused interest under scientists and researchers already in the pre-revolutionary Russia. The unique monument was compared with the pompous stone round churches of Solikamsk and Solvychegodsk. Igor Grabar saw in that church a late provincial resume of the Moscow uzorochya, with its striving for "painting". He wrote that "its naive combination echoes Moscow and Ukraine, which is fancifully weaved into a densely inwrought tapestry, with a peculiar odour of the neighbouring East".

The term "Siberian Baroque" was created by Irkutsk local historian D. A. Boldyrev-Kazarin in 1924, When mentioning the possibility of the participation of Buryat workers, Boldyrev-Kazarin said, that in Siberia "some details of Mongolian and Chinese architecture have well-known forms of kokoshniks", while "Khanty, Tatar and Bukharian" influences determine the special decor of churches in Ishim, Yalutorovsk and Tara.

The issue of the relationships between Eastern and Ukrainian Baroque and Siberian Baroque of the 18th century was also researched in the Soviet times. Some found a "Buryat decor" in Irkutsk churches, and if judging their size and construction, they were built by architects of the Northern Russian cities Totma and Veliky Ustyug. According to T. S. Proskuryakova, early Siberian church architecture divides between two "subregional types": Western Siberian (Tobolsk, Tyumen, the area behind the Ural mountains) and Eastern Siberian (Irkutsk). H. Yu. Kaptikov also uses that sorting system. He sees in Siberian architecture of the 18th century one of the provincial schools in Russian Baroque, along with Totma-Ustyug, Vyatsk and Uralian.

== Examples of Siberian Baroque ==
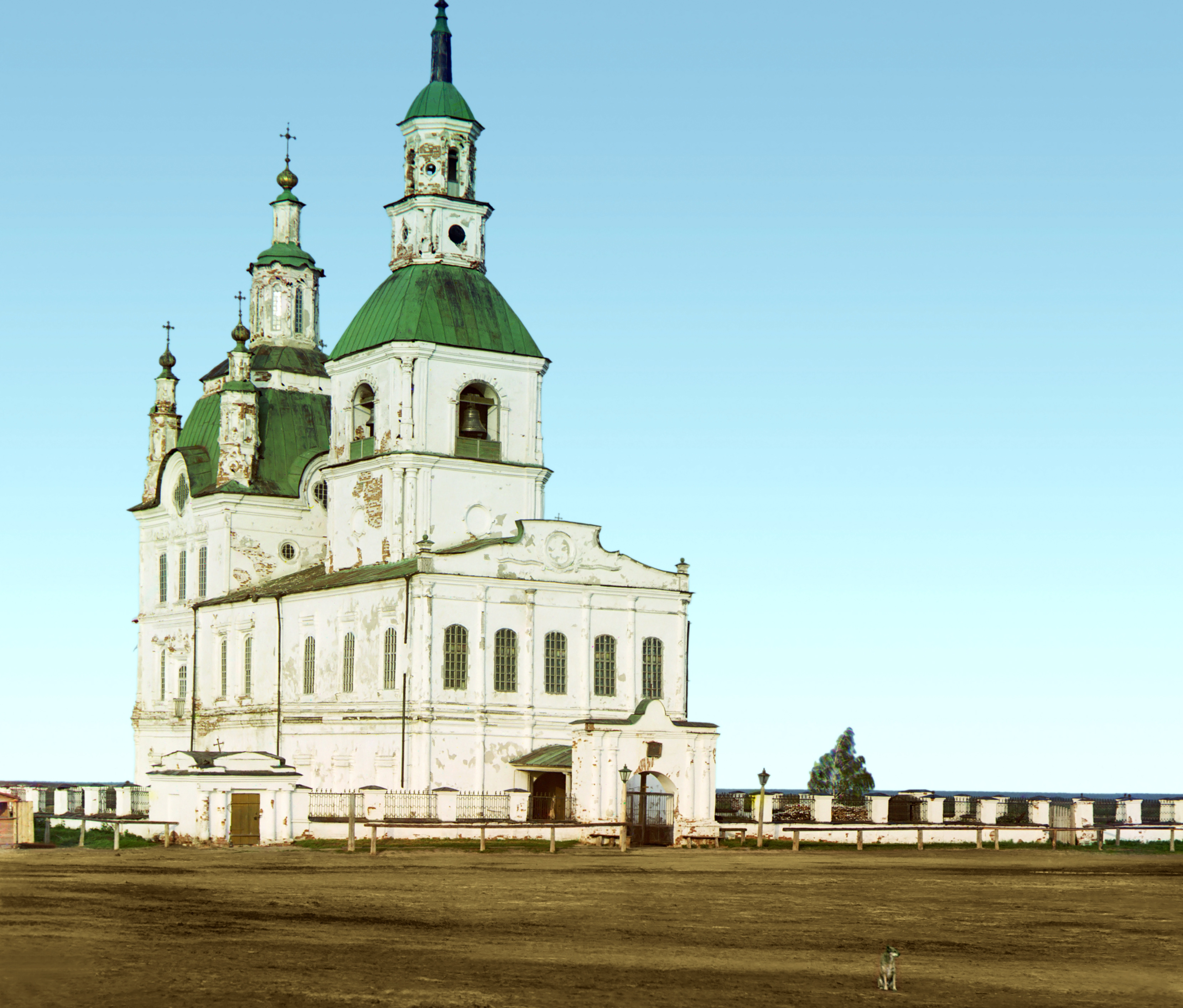
The Trinity cathedral of Yalutorovsk in the early 20th century

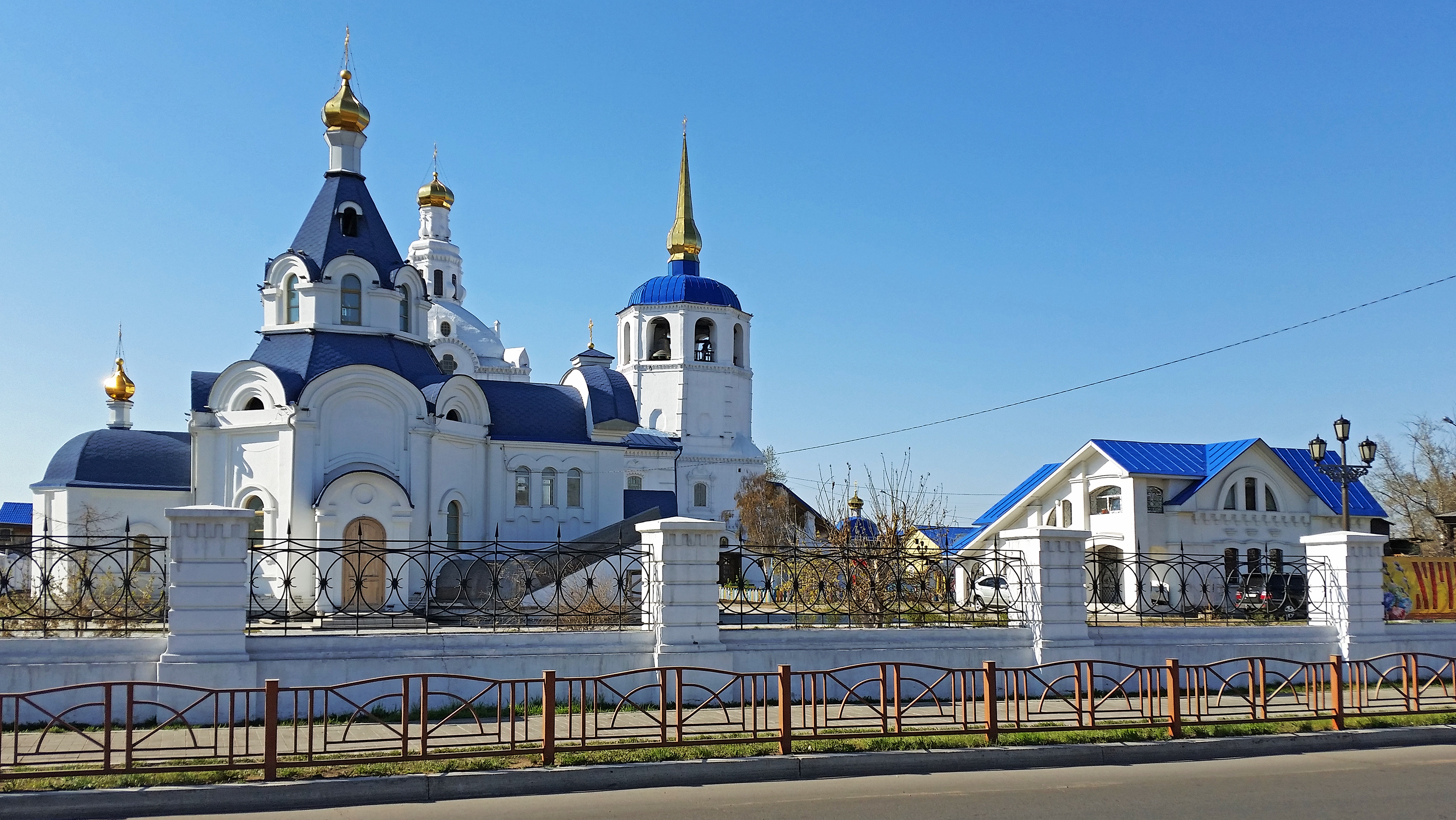
Odigitrievsky Cathedral in Ulan-Ude

=== Irkutsk ===
- Ascension church
- Church of the Transfiguration of the Lord
- Church of Vladimir
- Feast of the Cross church
- Our Lady of the Sign church
- Tikhvin church
- Trinity church
- Wondermaking church

=== Tobolsk ===
- Church of Zachary and Elizabeth
- Feast of the Cross church

=== Tomsk ===
- Epiphany church
- Kazan church of the Theotokos-Alekseyev monastery
- Our Lady of the Sign church
- Resurrection church

=== Tyumen ===
- Church of the Saviour
- Holy Trinity Monastery
- Znamensky Cathedral

=== Other settlements ===
- Assumption Cathedral in Yeniseysk
- Cathedral of the Trinity Monastery in Turukhansk
- Church of the Savior in Minusinsk
- Church of the Savior in Tara
- Church of the Transfiguration of the Lord in Nizhnyaya Sinyachikha
- Epiphany Cathedral in Ishim
- Holy Intercession Cathedral in Krasnoyarsk
- Holy Trinity cathedral in Kansk
- Intercession Church in Khanty-Mansiysk
- Odigitrievsky Cathedral in Ulan-Ude
- Spaso-Preobrazhensky Cathedral in Posolskoye
- Spassky Cathedral in Novoselenginsk
- Sretensky Cathedral in Yalutorovsk
- Transfiguration of the Saviour cathedral in Novokuznetsk

== See also ==
- Petrine Baroque
- Elizabethan Baroque
- Russian architecture
