= Church of the Saviour, Tyumen =

Church in Tyumen Oblast, Russia

Church of the Saviour
- Church of the Image of "The Saviour Not Made by Hands"
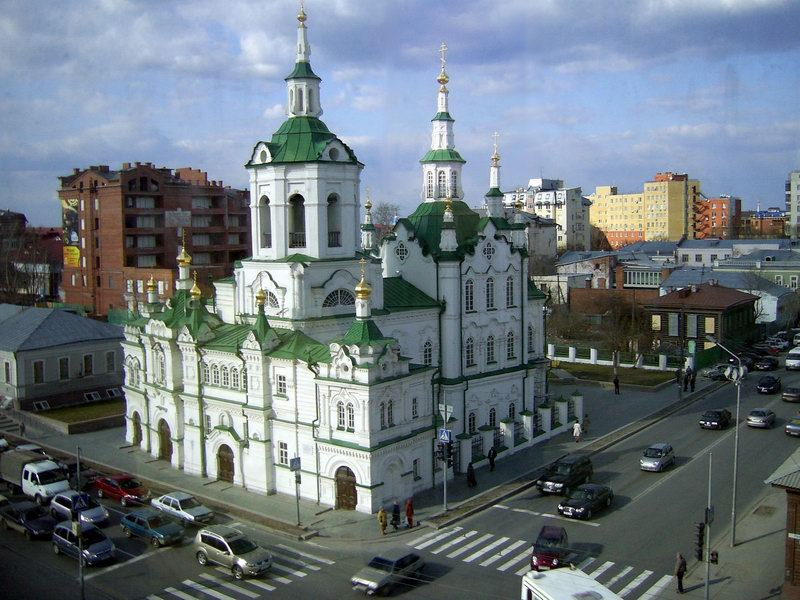
- A view from the Institute of Law and Rights of the Tyumen State University
- Church of the Saviour
- 57°9′21″N 65°31′54″E
- Location: Tyumen, Russia
- Country: Russia
- Denomination: Russian Orthodox

History
- Founder: Hieromonk Iosif
- Events: Closure on 15 January 1930

Architecture
- Designated: 1 July [O.S. 20 June] 1796
- Architectural type: Siberian Baroque
- Completed: 1819

Administration
- Diocese: Tobolsk and Tyumen
- Parish: Tyumen

The Church of the Saviour, also known as the Church of the Image of "The Saviour Not Made by Hands" (Russian: Храм в честь Нерукотворённого О́браза Спа́са, romanized: Khram v chest' Nerukotvoryonogo Obraza Spasa) or shorter Spasskaya Church (Russian: Спасская Церковь, Spasskaya Tserkov), is a church in Tyumen, Tyumen Oblast, Russia, located at Lenin Street, 43, in a crossroad between the Chelyuskintsev Street. Built in a late 18th-century Siberian Baroque and early 20th-century neo russian style, the building is one of the oldest and most expressive churches in Siberia, which is under monument protection.

It is believed that the early wooden church was raised in 1586, which after several fires was reconstructed into a stable stone building in the late 17th century. The Church of the Saviour saw another two re-buildings in the late 19th century. After the 1917 October Revolution, the church was subject of confiscations of its property in 1922, and in 1930 was closed and became a momentary prison. After the failed attempt to destroy the church two years later, it has been used as an archive and a library. Nowadays the building stores material for the Tyumen Local Historical Museum, but is expected to be returned to the local eparchy in 2019.

== History ==
=== The church at the Large Spasskaya Street ===
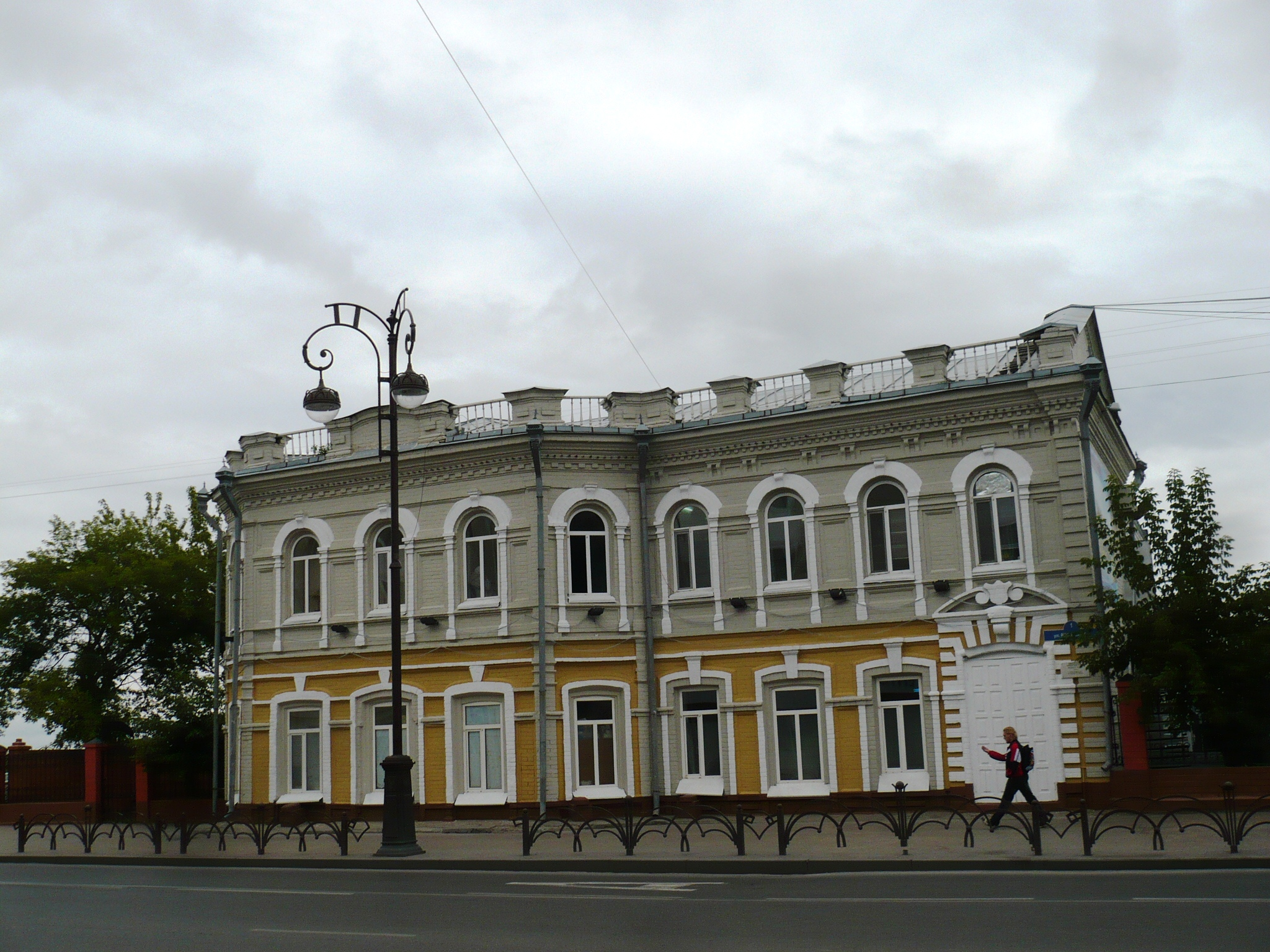
According to A. S. Ivanenko, the Church of the All-Merciful Saviour initially lied somewhere here.

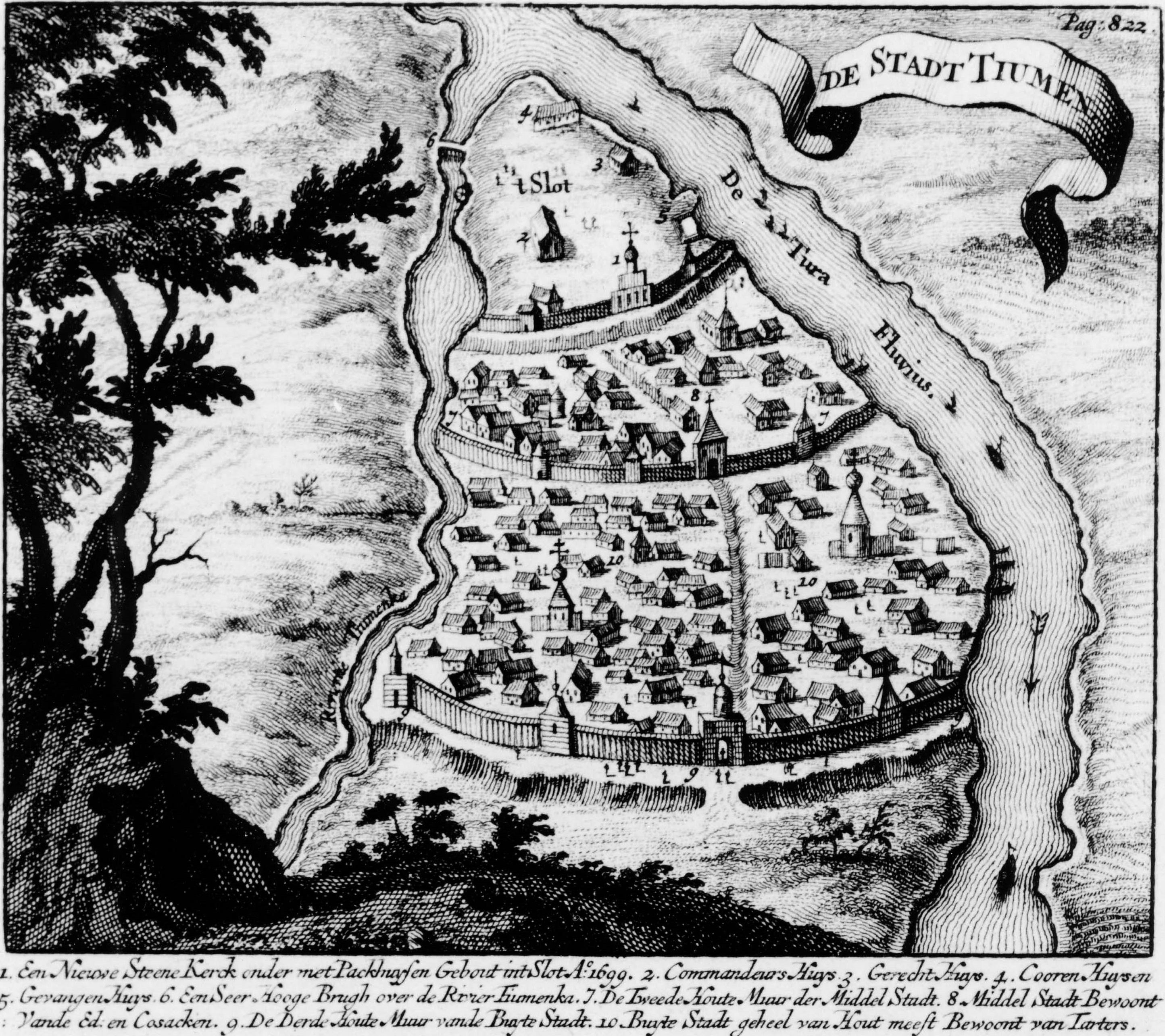
An image of Tyumen between the 1668 and 1695 fires. Print from Nicolaas Witsen's book Northern and Eastern Tartaria.

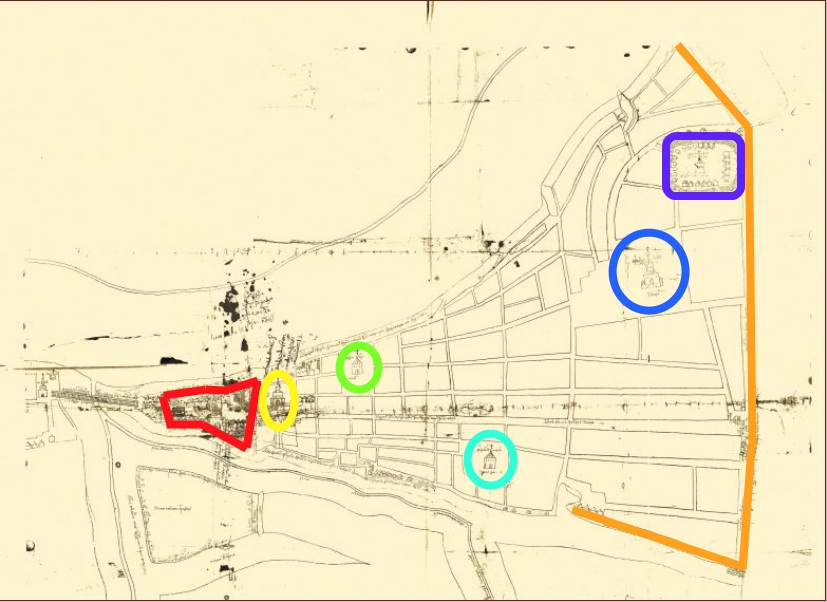
A map of Tyumen, around 1700, from Gerhard Friedrich Müller's portfolio. The Church of the All-Merciful Saviour is emphasized by the yellow contour.

According to the Kungursk Codex (p. 121), the first Church of the Saviour was constructed in 1586 in the Tyumen Kremlin:

on the raised town of Tyumen, July of day 29, which Chingi heareth, the Church of the All-Merciful Saviour was raiseth, the first one in Siberia

The Kazan church historian Ivan Pokrovsky agreed with the codex. However, according to the Esipov Codex, the Siberian ethnographer Nikolay Abramov and Pyotr Butsinsky from Kharkov, the mentioned church was a different one in Tyumen. P. N. Butsinsky names a document, which states that in the 16th century there was no such church with that name in the town.

The first reliable account of the Tyumen Church of the Saviour comes from the 1624 Dozornaya book, which describes a wooden, "cold" All-Merciful Church in a posad. It was located on the Market (Guest) square, near the walls of the Tyumen Kremlin. Local historian Aleksandr Ivanenko assumes that it was named after the Spasskaya gate tower of the Kremlin, from which started the Large Spasskaya Street (now the Republic Street). According to Ivanenko, the church was located a bit to the left of a house at the Republic Street; that place is now swamped by the Tura River.

After a heavy fire in 1668 the walls of the posad were relocated to the east, and consequently the Spasskaya gate tower was moved from the Kremlin to the place of the burnt up Znamenskaya tower of the Ostrog walls; today it would be lying between the crossroad of the Republic and Chelyuskintsev Streets. The new walls of the posad at the future Irkutsk Street (now the Chelyskintsev Street) stood undamaged until another fire erupted in 1766. At the same time on a drawing of Tyumen between 1668 and 1695 from Nicolaas Witsen's book Northern and Eastern Tartaria and on a draft of the town around 1700, found by Golovachov in Gerhard Friedrich Müller's portfolio, the All-Merciful Church is seen in the same area near the Kremlin.

In the Tyumen city catalogue about the fire on 24 April [O.S. 14 April] 1687 there is also standing, that the Church of the Saviour was located near the Kremlin, and the fire sprang up to the Kremlin buildings. The church was also damaged in the fire of 12 October [O.S. 2 October] 1695, after which a decision was made to use stone as building material, but because of needs for the Northern War the plan was not completely realized. Academic Müller remarked that in 1741 the Church of the Image of "The Saviour Not Made by Hands" in Tyumen had a side altar of the Wondermaker Sergius of Radonezh, meaning the church was restored after the fire.

S. P. Zavarikhin and B. A. Zhuchenko claim that the new stone church was built on the side of the wooden Church of the Saviour with the side altar of the Mother of God icon of Tikhvin; as the church was chopped off in 1753, it was moved in the first half of the 18th century to the present place. A. S. Ivanenko's claim that the icon of the Image of "The Saviour Not Made by Hands" was kept in the stone Church of the Saviour with which people went on annual crucessions up to the village of Kamenka since the 1650s, at any rate proofs the presence of both the wooden All-Merciful Church and the stone church. I. V. Belich thinks that after the fire of 1766 the wooden church was not recovered till 1796, the date when the stone church was being built; however, other opinions also exist.

=== Stone church ===
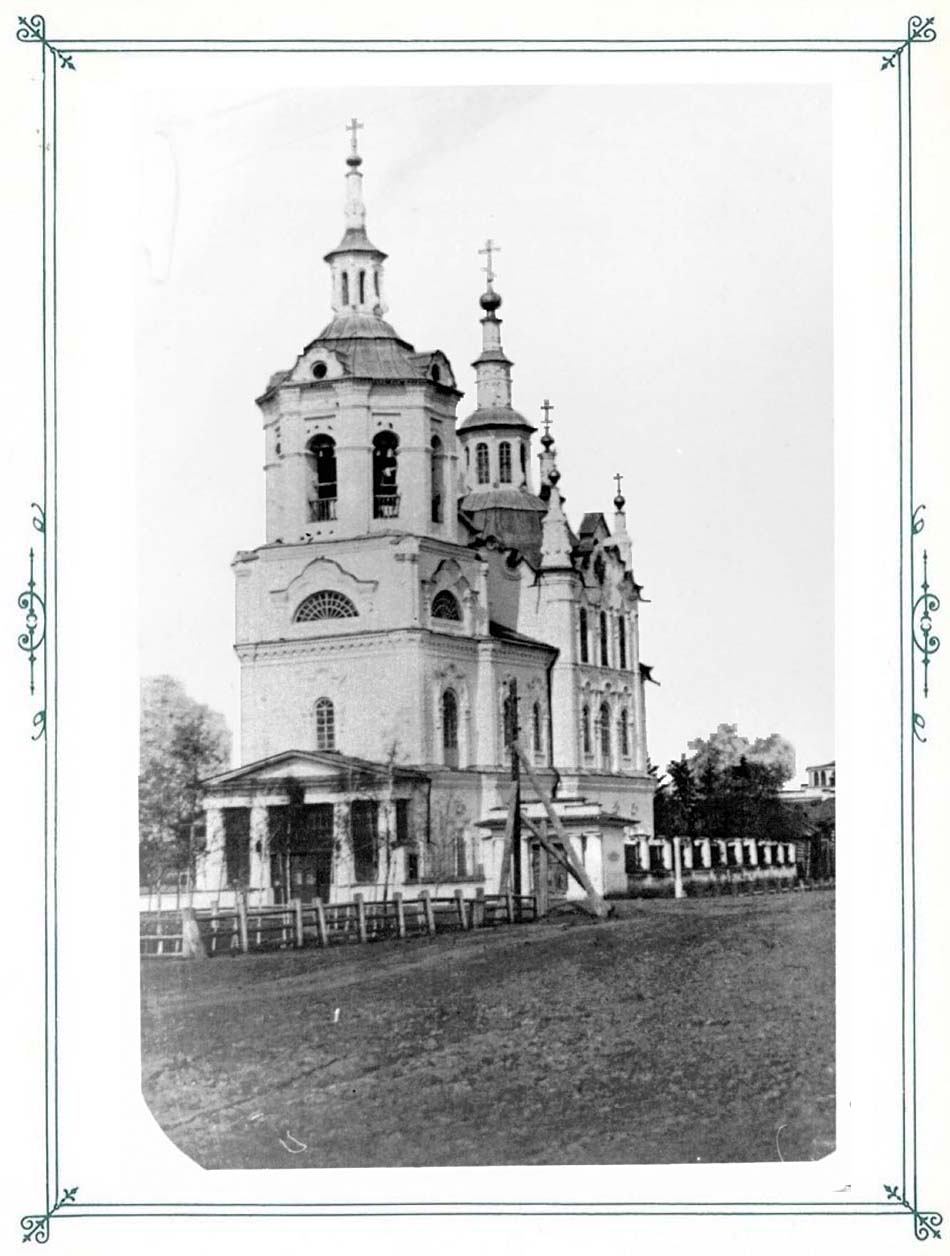
The initial look of the church, western side, by 1887

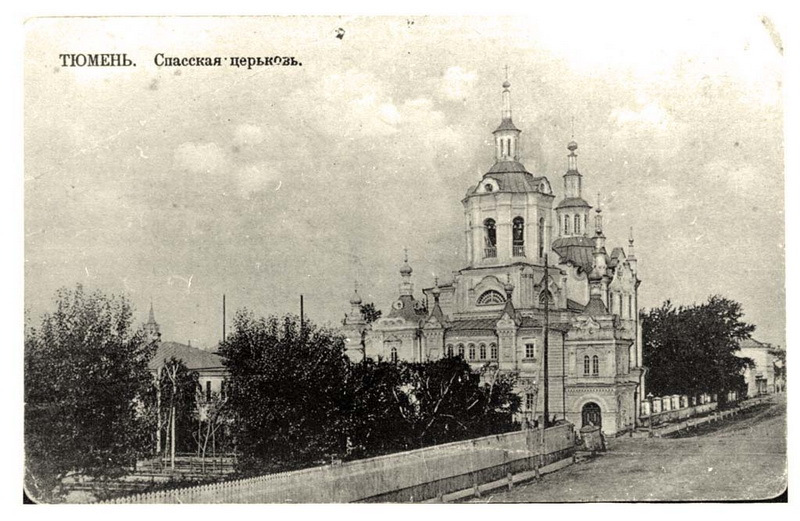
Western side after reconstruction, based on B. B. Tsinke's plan

The foundation of the stone Church of the Saviour and the Church of the Dormition of the Mother of God (1768, destroyed), the Cathedral of Our Lady of the Sign (1768), the Church of the Feast of the Cross (1775), the Church of Archangel Michael (1781) and the Church of the Feast of the Ascension and Saint George (1789) concluded the third construction period in the history of Tyumen. The two floors high stone Church of the Saviour was ground broken on 1 July [O.S. 20 June] 1796 (the memorial desk falsely states the year of 1794). In 1798, the winter (warm) church of the bottom floor was completed and consecrated in honor of the Mother of God icon of Tikhvin. The building of the upper church was finished only in 1819, and subsequently consecrated in honor of the Image of "The Saviour Not Made by Hands". The other name of the church – the Church of the Saviour – was given by its altar. The nearby street was also renamed subsequently.

In the stone church, the builders (ktitors) and the church's oldest ministers were buried in special vaults. The one-year Saviour and Archangel faith school was opened at the church on 18 February [O.S. 6 February] 1893.

Before the revolution, the building was reconstructed two times. The first one was drafted by architect B. B. Tsinke of the Tobolsk and Siberian eparchy in 1887. The westside was fortified by a massive two-floor parvise with cone porches in neo russian style. The new size crossed the red lines and practically enveloped the church. The other reconstruction was proposed by the mayor of Tyumen and the former merchant of the first guild Andrey Tekutyev, the latter of whom for many years, between 1902 and 1916, was churchwarden.

After the death of his wife Evdokia Tekutyeva in 1913, the state architect K. P. Chakin drafted a construction plan of the side altar after the request of the buyer. However, the building was already a cultural property, after which the eparchial consistory had to send the project to the Imperial Archeological Commission, which in November 1913 forbade reconstruction, as those

will cloak very interesting artistic and architectural pieces of the northern facade and destroy beautiful platbands.

With that said, Tekutyev's prohibition was not overturned. K. P. Chakin changed the project, and from 1914 to 1916 the northern side altar was built with the mercenary's means. In the side altar altar stones were placed; on the first floor in honor of the namesake saints of the Tekutyev couple – Andrew of Crete and the venerable martyr Eudokia of Heliopolis, on the second floor in honor of John of Tobolsk and Sergius of Radonezh. Tekutyev and his wife were buried in the burial vault.

The northern side altar almost exactly echoed the original size, having a unique in Siberia "twin" shape. After a few years, the western facade of the initial church and the northern side altar were put together with an outbuilding of a two floors combination of parvise and narthex, built in a neo russian-like style.

=== Post-war era ===
The first wave of religious persecutions in Tyumen took place in 1922. From 8 April to 5 May, four pood (approximately 65,52 kg) and six pounds (approximately 240 g) of property was confiscated from the church. In November, at the 5th anniversary of the October Revolution, 41 town streets were renamed, including the Spasskaya Street (Saviour Street), which took the name of Lenin. Artist A. P. Mitinsky remembers how the remains of A. I. Tekutyev were taken from the church around that time, between 1920 and 1921. Until June 1927 the Church of the Saviour and the Church of All Saints were the town's only churches of the followers of Patriarch Tikhon (other two churches were given to members of the sect "Obnovlenchestvo"). About 1500 churchgoers of the Church of the Saviour were counted.

In 1929 another wave of religious persecution began. One communist newspaper accused protoiereus Aleksey Tobolkin and the dean Ilya Populov of "stealing" church property. The ordinance of the presidium of the Tyumen city council decreed to close on 16 December the two Obnovlenchestvo churches, the Church of Our Lady of the Sign and the Archangel Michael Church, and eventually on 15 January 1930 the Church of the Saviour, for "not paying debts" and "non-fulfillment of obligations for using religious property". Initially the church was used as a momentary prison for criminals who were later exiled to the north for dekulakization. After the decreasing collectivization in 1932 and dekulakization, it was proposed to demolish the church, right after the Dormition of the Mother of God Cathedral, until a circular from 3 August, Nr. 17147, was sent by the Ministry of Education to the city council:

The sector of science informs, that the Church of the Saviour of the city of Tyumen is under accounting and protection of the Narkompros, and therefore any damages and robbery of its outer architecture are impermissible and will be punished for violating the VZIK and SNK decrets about the protection of archaic art monuments...

As a result, only one separately lying belfry was destroyed, and until 1960 the building (and, before that, the Holy Trinity monastery) was used as an archive by the People's Commissariat for Internal Affairs (NKVD), the Ministry for State Security (MGB) and the Ministry of Internal Affairs (MVD), and as the Central State Library (now the Tyumen Scientific Library). From August 1941 to March 1942, 96 boxes of Crimean gold and antique museum valuables evacuated from a Simferopol museum during the Great Patriotic War were preserved there. The valuables were convoyed to Tyumen and guarded by K. Y. Dubinin, father of the former head of the Central Bank of Russia S. K. Dubinin.

After the Council of People's Commissars published ordinances "About the order of opening churches" from 28 November 1943 and "About the order of opening religious beadhouses" from 19 November 1944, believers made a solicitation in 1945 in front of the Tyumen executive committee to return their church, as only one active church in that town existed at that time – the small All-Saints Church; instead, the committee opened entry to the Church of Our Lady of the Sign.

Because of unsatisfactory conditions, the archive was moved in 1959 to Tobolsk, and the library into a new building at the Ordzhonikidze Street, 59. Funds and a scientific library settled in the church house. In an ordinance by the Council of Ministers from 22 May 1948, Nr. 503, the Church of the Saviour along with the Church of Our Lady of the Sign and the Holy Trinity monastery were protected as architectural monuments. The ordinance by the Council of Ministries of RSFSR from 30 August 1960, Nr. 1327, listed it under republican significance. In the mid-1970s began the restoration, but it was interrupted after the restorers were sent to Moscow for the upcoming 1980 Summer Olympic Games. The work was resumed only on 24 March 2004, upon the order of governor of the Tyumen Oblast S. S. Sobyanin, and was finished in autumn 2006.

== The Church of the Saviour today ==
Today the Church of the Saviour is an object of cultural heritage (a landmark) of federal significance (code 7210007000). It is used as a museum depository of the Tyumen Local Historical Museum. Among its exhibits is one of the first printed books in cyrillic, the Triodion by Schweipolt Fiol, published in 1492.

On 15 July 1991 the presidium of the Tyumen City Council of the People's Deputies made a decision to give the church to the Tobolsk and Tyumen eparchy, but because of ongoing construction of the new museum building on the Sovyetskaya Street, 63, the church is expected to be re-opened for worship in 2019.

Since 2006, the Church of the Saviour was taken into a conflict when a new Marriott hotel, and then a housing estate, was planned to be built around it. Picketings, as well as the unrecognition of the area by the court and even an open letter by members of the Council of Writers of Russia (among the authors were V. N. Ganichev and V. N. Rasputin) were the results. The August 2012 adjudgement for members of the public sphere was declined by a cassation on 26 December that year.

== Architecture ==
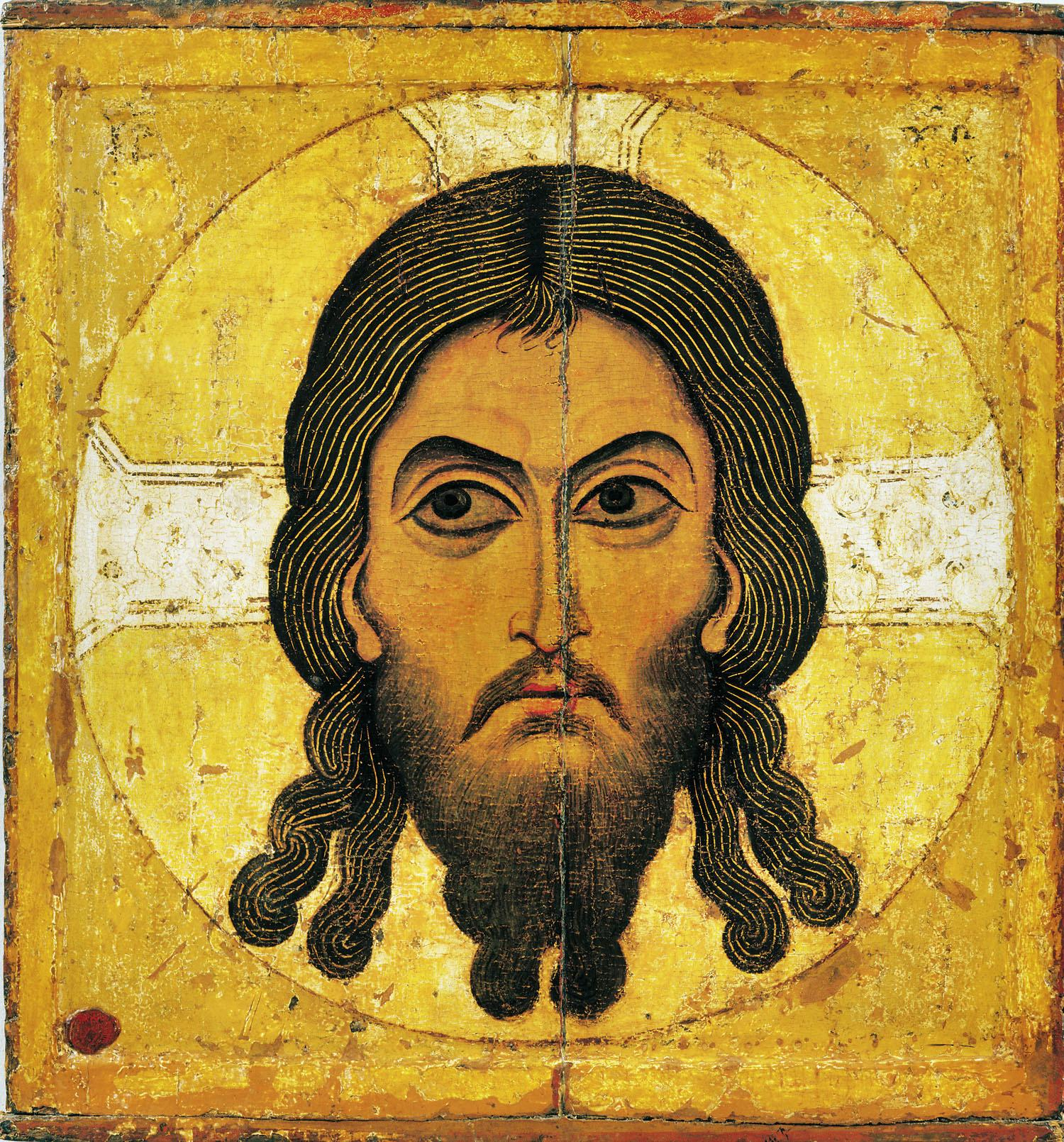
The Saviour Not Made by Hands

The church is oblong and three-parted, which is typical for western-Siberian religious buildings. The plan of the Church of the Saviour reminds the earlier built Ascension and Saint George Church in Tyumen; although even some sizes are similar, the Church of the Saviour is still more originally. Elements of the Siberian Baroque were used, although less traditional as opposed to the Our Lady of the Sign Church.

The church is extended by a nave, and a belfry stands above the refectory, reminding the "octaves on the quartets" in its architecture. It is "doubled" not only in length – as it is based on two main volumes – but also in height by its two floors. The winter services took place in the basement, which was roofed by the nave vault. The facetted vault with eight troughs on the upper floor is more expressive. The platbands are very different by its design. As described by architecture historians, the "Baroque style is noticeable in the church's plastered manufacture with figurical cupola covered by a fracture, broken pediments, and tiered contrastically degressive octades with sculptural volutes".

The motive of the eight cupolas gave the church an original decorative picture. The small size of the corner cupolas and a more complicated stepped construction of the main cupola made the church seen as having only one cupola. The apse is crowning at the height. The church's facades all have different decor. Polished tower-like pilasters are flanking the church's quartets, which, like finials, are crowned with small cupolas.

Architecturally separated from other constructions is the wide, western-orientated parvise, built by B. B. Tsinke in 1887. It represents the neo russian style and differs in its fractional and plastered facades, which feature many kokoshniks, columns, different shirinkis (a type of coffers), "runners", "perspective" portals, tented roofs, among others. Researchers remark that the plaster congestion of the church's facades makes it one of the most decorative in Tyumen; according to S. P. Zavarikhina and V. A. Zhuchenko, "it implies over a unity in architecture" and "no outbuilding is needed".

In that floor in the interior of the summer church are fragments of paintings, probably by a master of a manufactury, P. M. Belkov. There was also the wonder making icon "The Saviour Not Made by Hands". The iconostasis was not found to the present day.

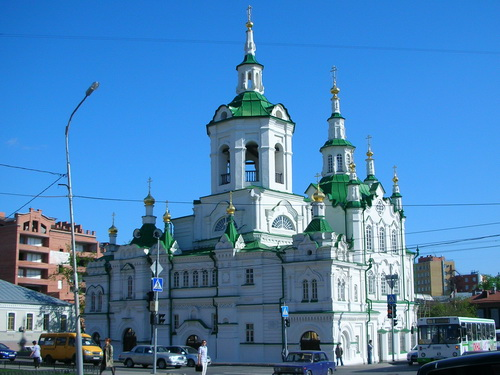
View from the Lenin Street (western side)

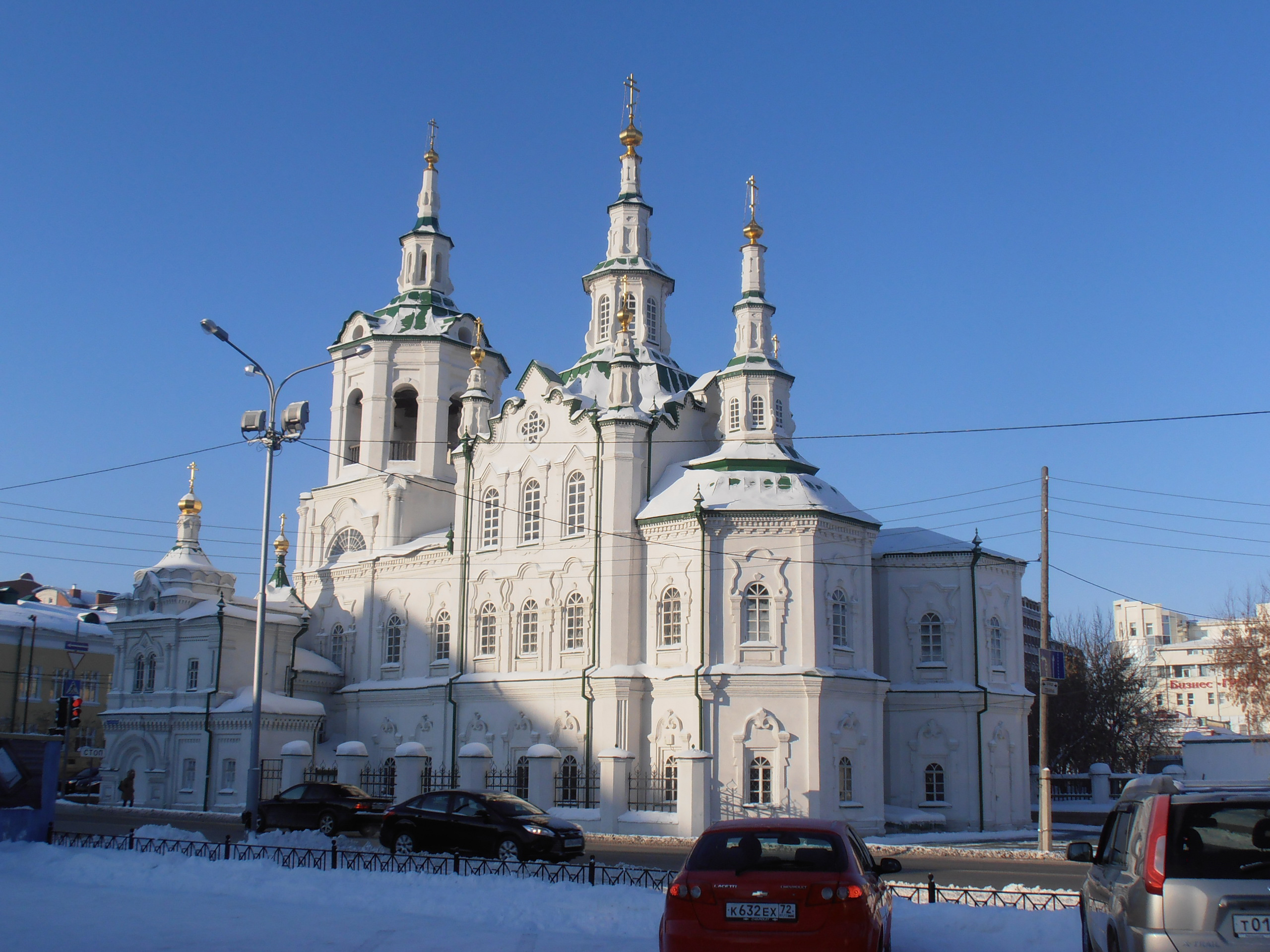
View from the Chelyuskintsev Street (southern side)

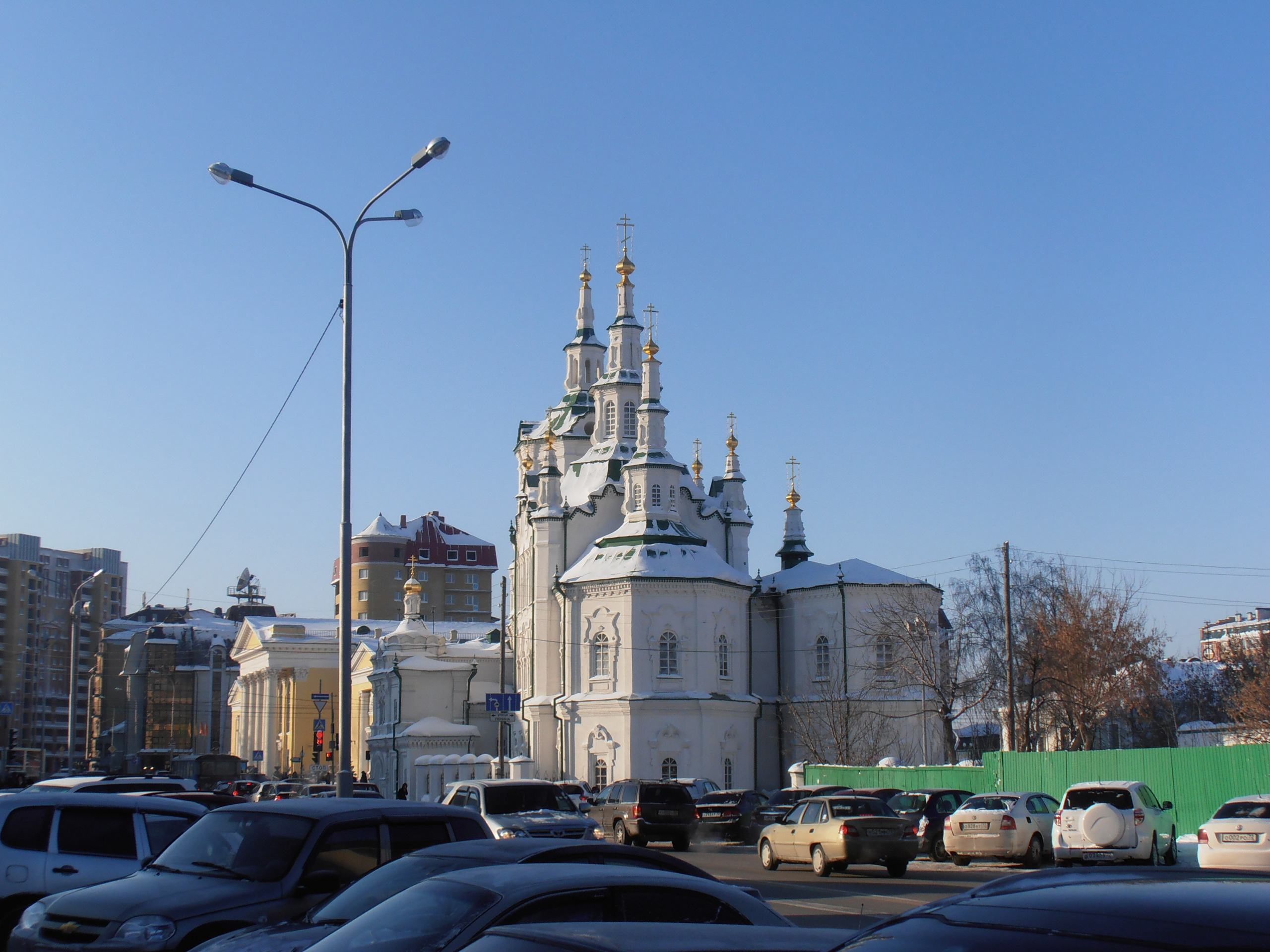
View from the Republic Street (eastern side)

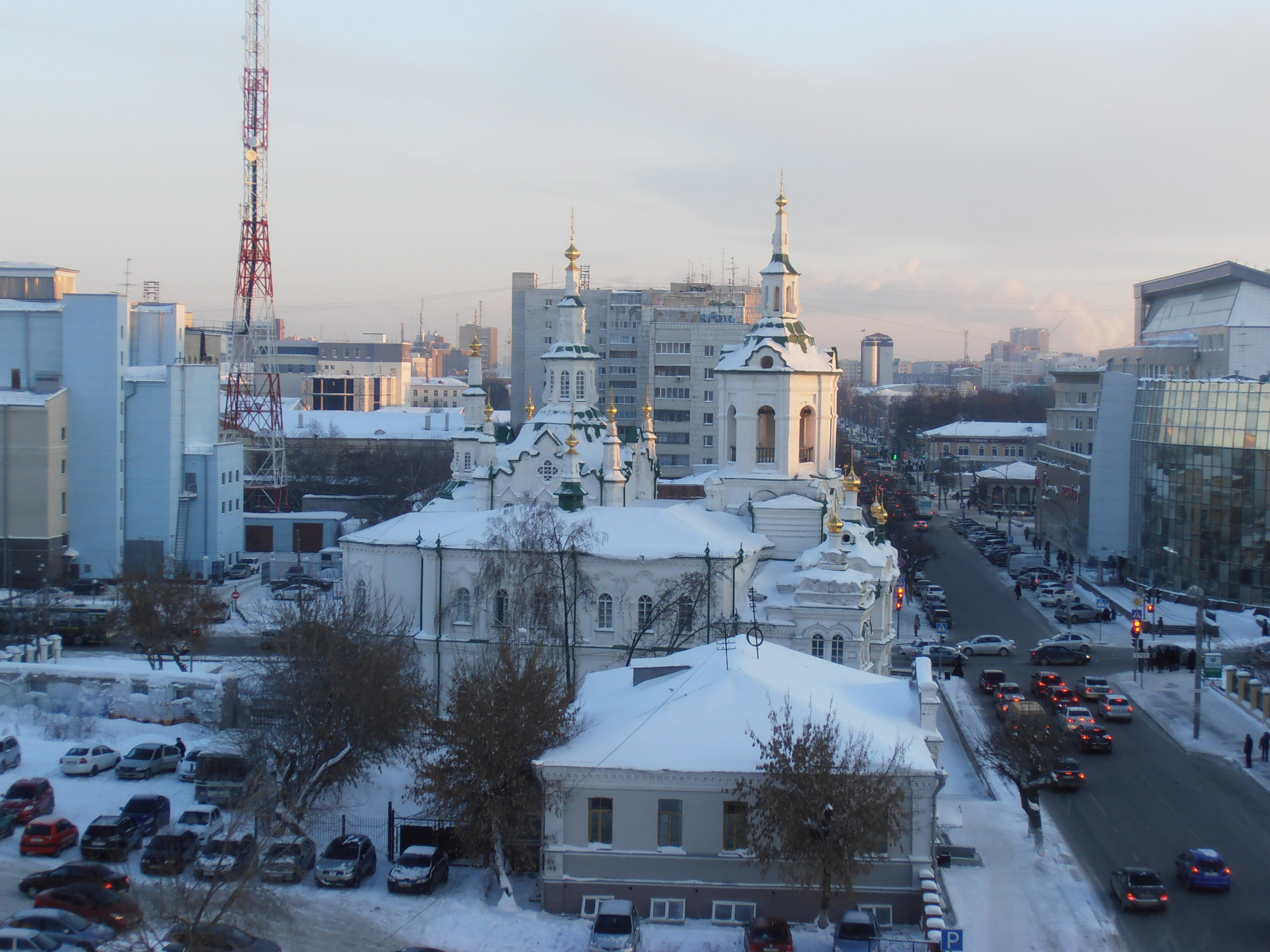
View from the Kirov Street (northern side)

== Footnotes ==
- P. M. Golovachov (1903). Тюмень в XVII столетии [Tyumen in the 18th century] (in Russian) (1st ed.). Moscow: I. N. Kushnerev and Co.
- B. A. Zhuchenko (2011). "New churches". In N. A. Zavitnevich (ed.). Тюмень 425. Моё достояние: историко-краеведческий альманах [Tyumen 425. My achievements: historic and local historic almanac] (in Russian). Vol. I. XI century BC – 1861 (1st ed.). Tyumen: OLMAPRESS. pp. 74–75. ISBN 978-5-904271-03-9.
- S. P. Zavarikhin; B. A. Zhuchenko (2004). Архитектура Тюмени [Architecture of Tyumen] (in Russian) (1st ed.). Tyumen: Raduga-T. pp. 22, 77–80, 128–129. ISBN 5-93544-001-6.
- A. S. Ivanenko (2008). "Street Chelyuskintsev". Новые прогулки по Тюмени: Путеводитель [New promenades through Tyumen: guidebook] (in Russian). Tyumen: Raduga-T. pp. 157–161. ISBN 978-5-93544-006-0.
- E. M. Kozlova-Afanasyeva (2008). "240. The Church of the Saviour (Lenin Street, 43)". Архитектурное наследие Тюменской области: Научный каталог [Architectural heritage of Tyumen Oblast: Scientific catalogue] (in Russian) (1st ed.). Tyumen: Art Publisher. pp. 249–250. ISBN 978-5-9901237-2-4.
- V. A. Kurmachov (2003). "Church of the Image of Christ the Saviour Not Made by Hands (1796–2002)". Храмы города Тюмени: Время. События. Люди. 1700–2003 гг [Churches of Tyumen: Time. Events. People. 1700 – 2003] (in Russian) (1st ed.). Tyumen: RUTRA. pp. 390–438.
- E. Sbitnev (2012). Спасская церковь в Тюмени [Church of the Saviour in Tyumen] (in Russian) (5). Tyumen: Siberian Orthodox Magazine.
