= Parvise =

Forecourt of a church building

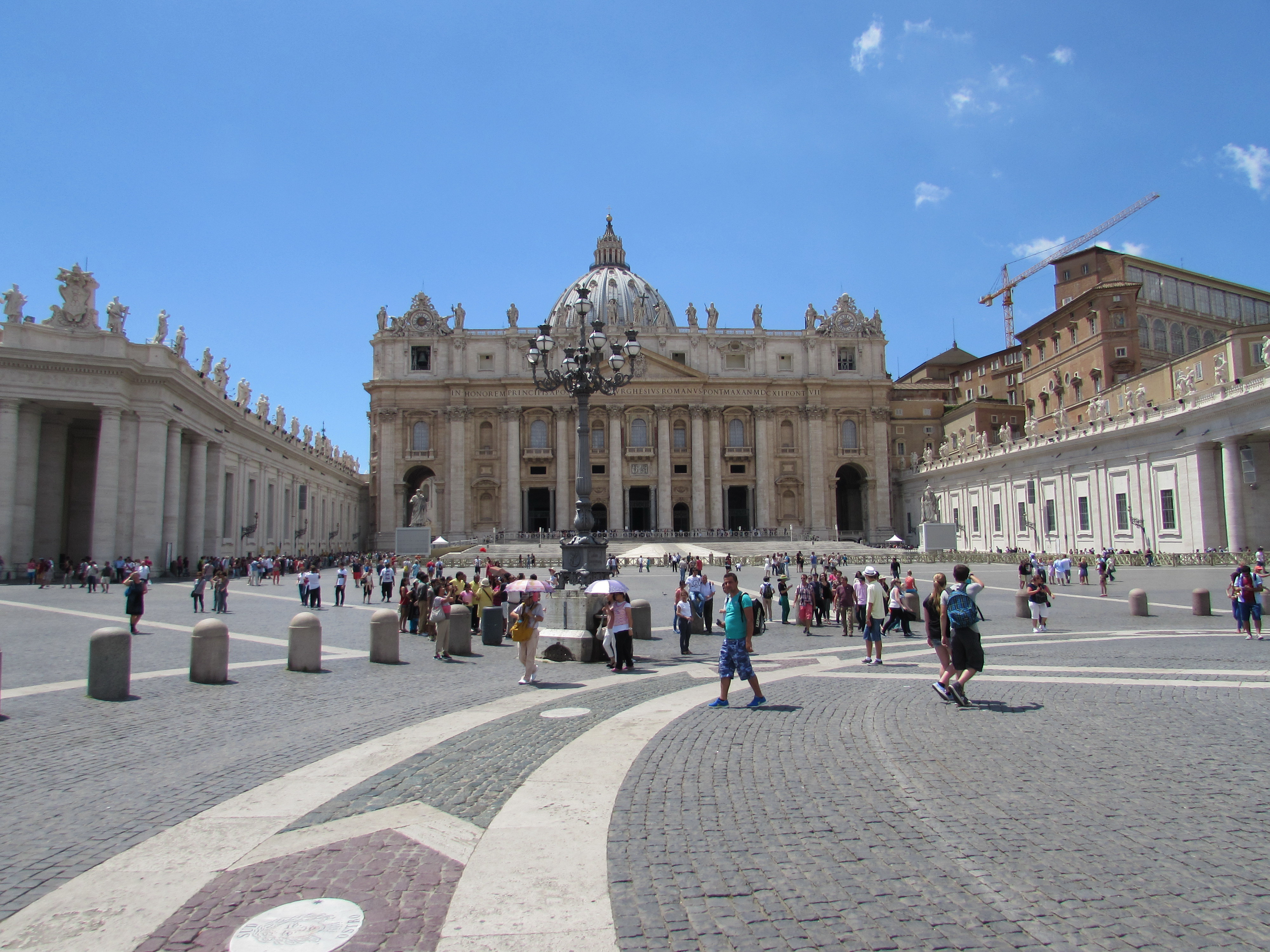
Part of St. Peter's Square in Rome, the parvis of St. Peter's Basilica

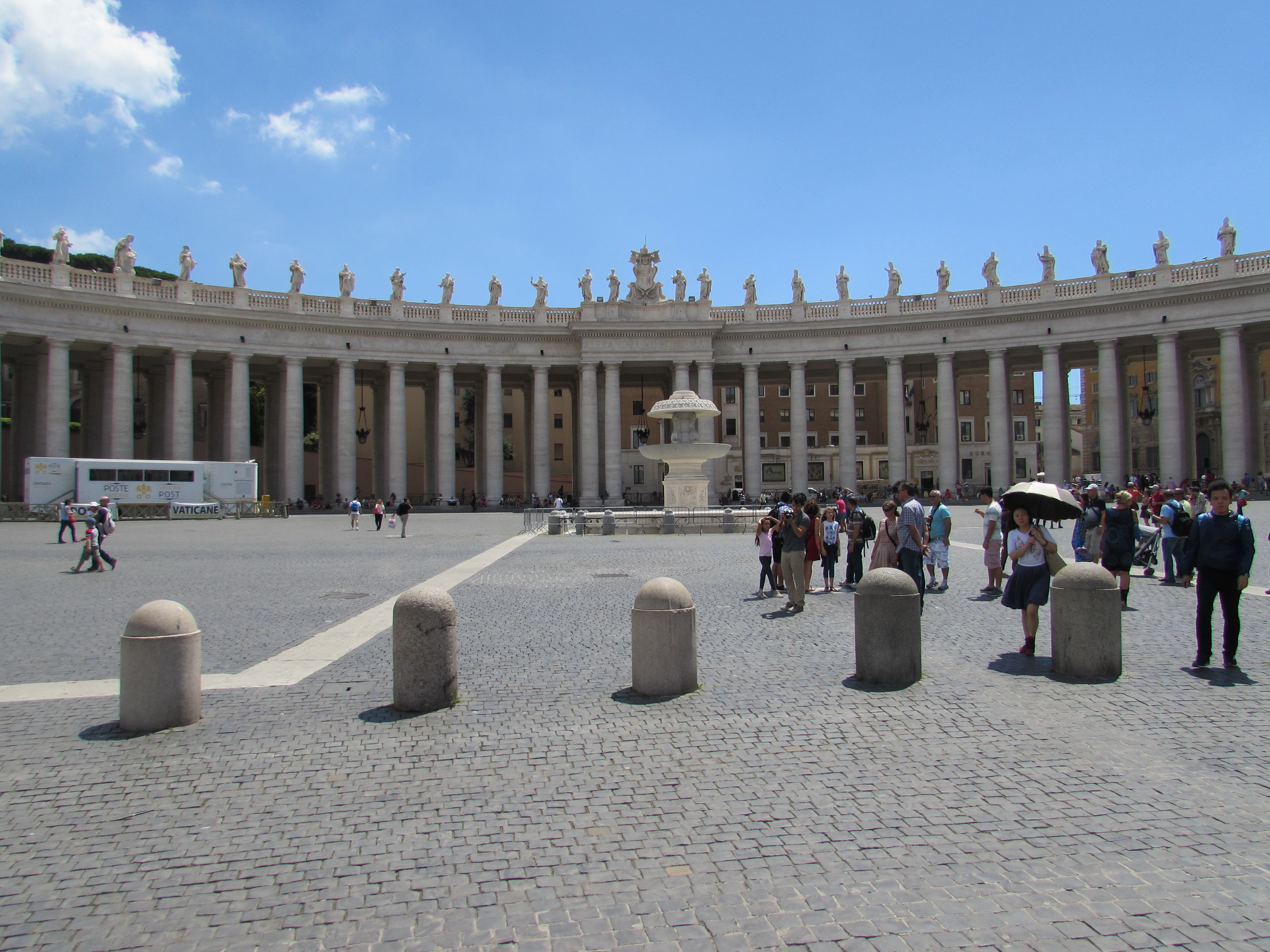
Colonnade of St. Peter's Square

A parvis or parvise is the open space in front of and around a cathedral or church, especially when surrounded by either colonnades or porticoes, as at St. Peter's Basilica in Rome. It is thus a church-specific type of forecourt, front yard or apron.

== Etymology ==
The term derives via Old French from the Latin paradisus meaning "paradise". This in turn came via Ancient Greek from the Indo-European Aryan languages of ancient Iran, where it meant a walled enclosure or garden precinct with heavenly flowers planted by the Clercs (Clerics).

== Parvis of St Paul's Cathedral ==
In London in the Middle Ages the serjeants-at-law practised at the parvis of St Paul's Cathedral, where clients could seek their counsel. In the 14th century Geoffrey Chaucer referred to "A sergeant of the lawe, war and wys / That often hadde been at the Parvys." Later, ecclesiastical courts developed at Doctors' Commons on the same site.

== Late English use ==
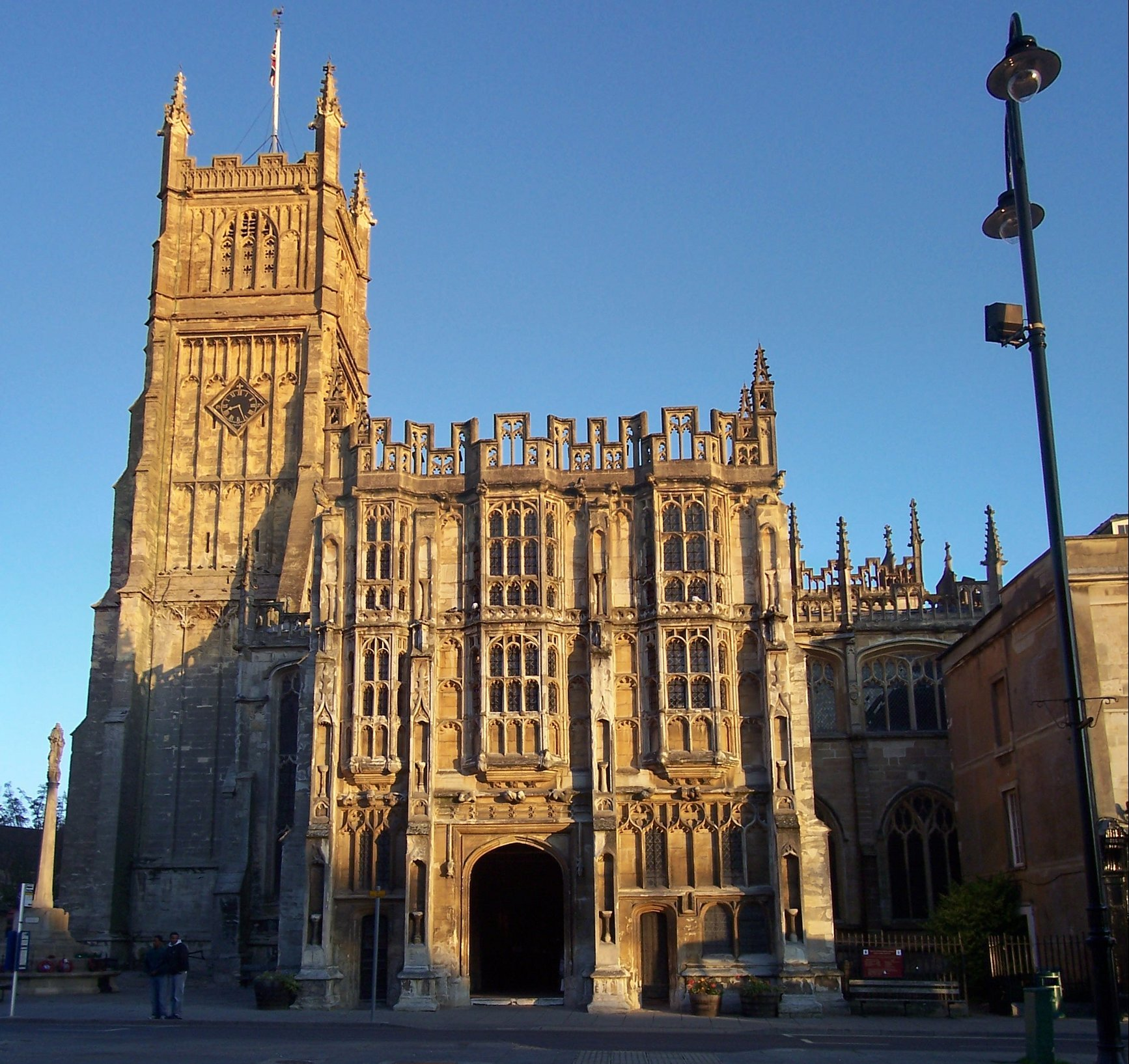
Three-storey Perpendicular Gothic porch of Church of St. John the Baptist, Cirencester: an elaborate example of what in later English usage has been called a parvise

In England the term was much later used to mean a room over the porch of a church. The architectural historians John Fleming, Hugh Honour and Nikolaus Pevsner, and the theologians Frank Cross and Elizabeth Livingstone all say this usage is wrong. The Oxford English Dictionary records this use as being "historical", and current in the middle of the 19th century. It may stem from an earlier misuse in F. Blomefield's book Norfolk, published in 1744.

=== Examples of English parvises ===
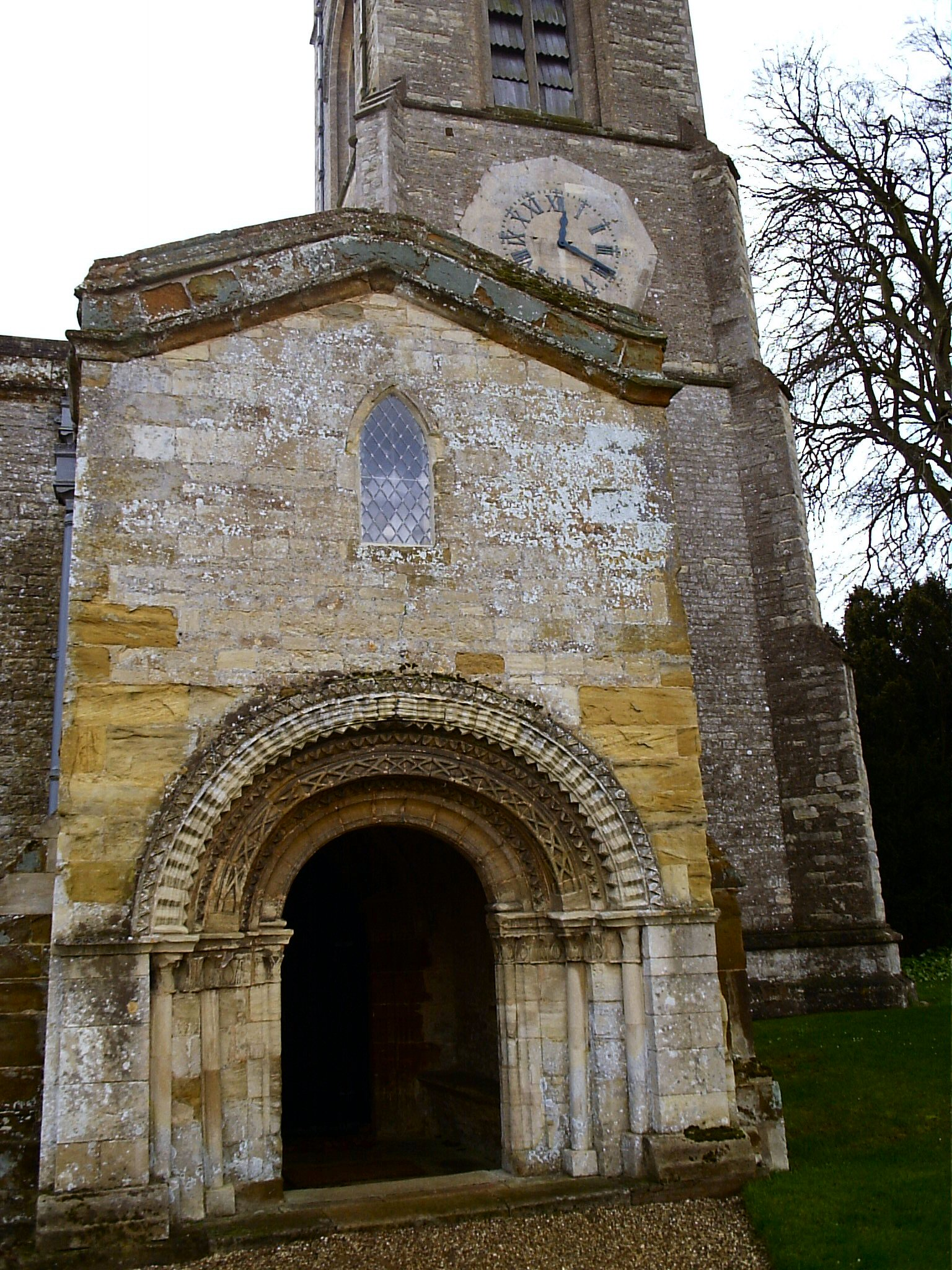
The Parvise at Castle Ashby, Northamptonshire

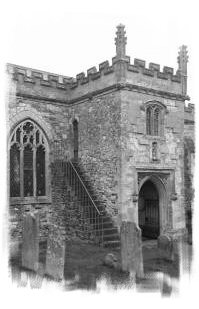
Bletchingley Church Parvise, Surrey

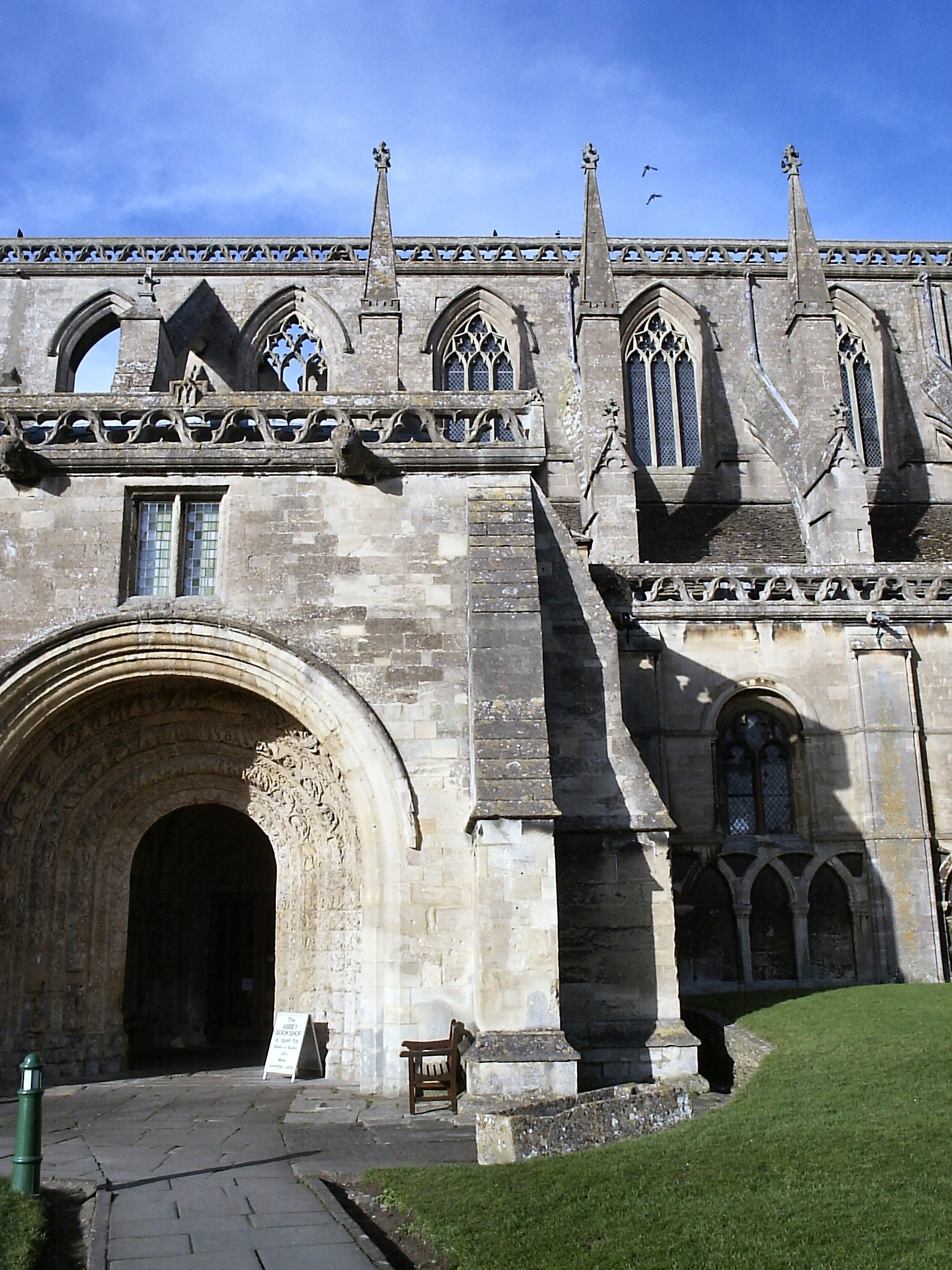
Malmesbury Abbey, Wiltshire

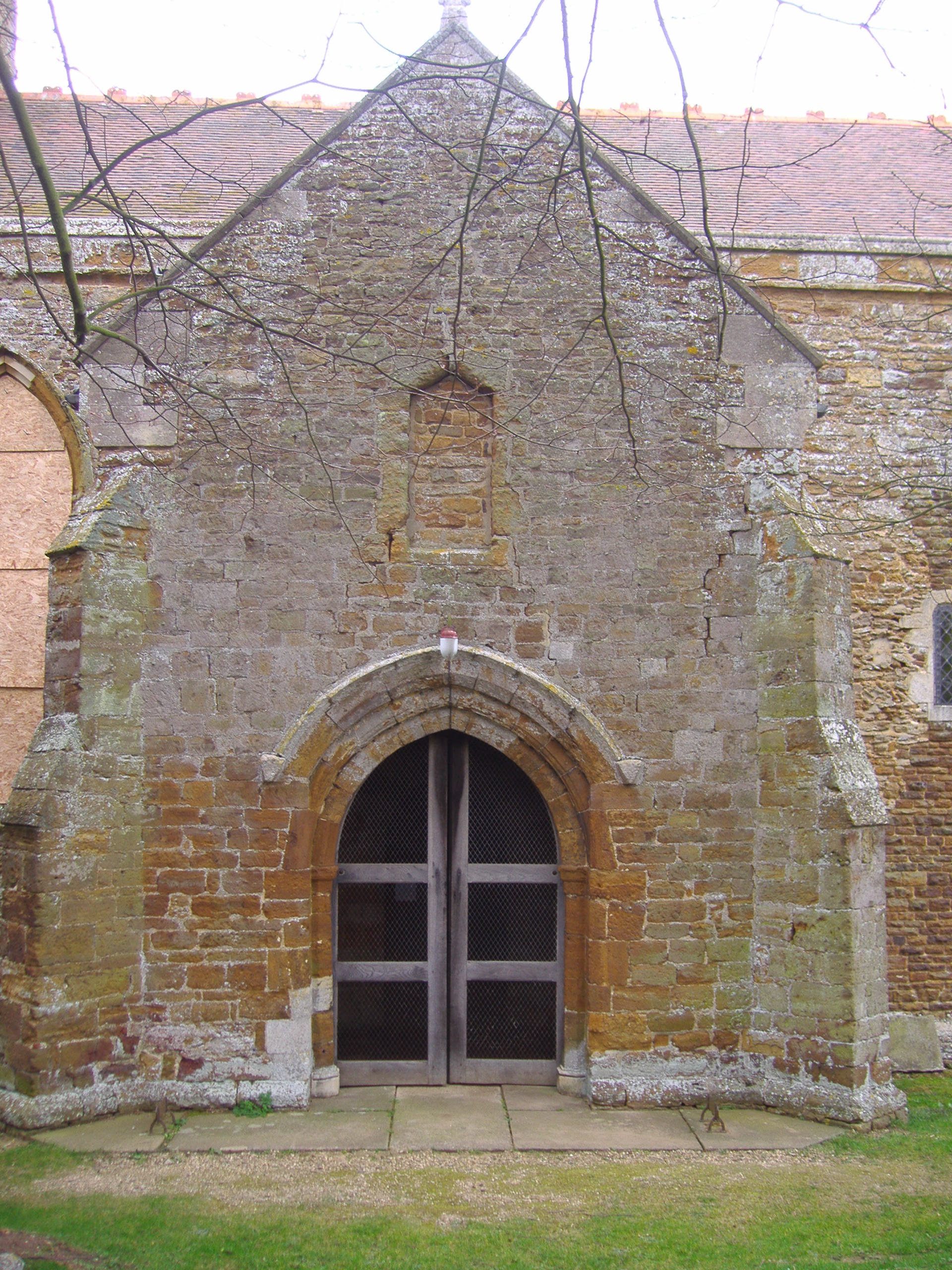
The Parvise at Dodford Parish Church, Northamptonshire

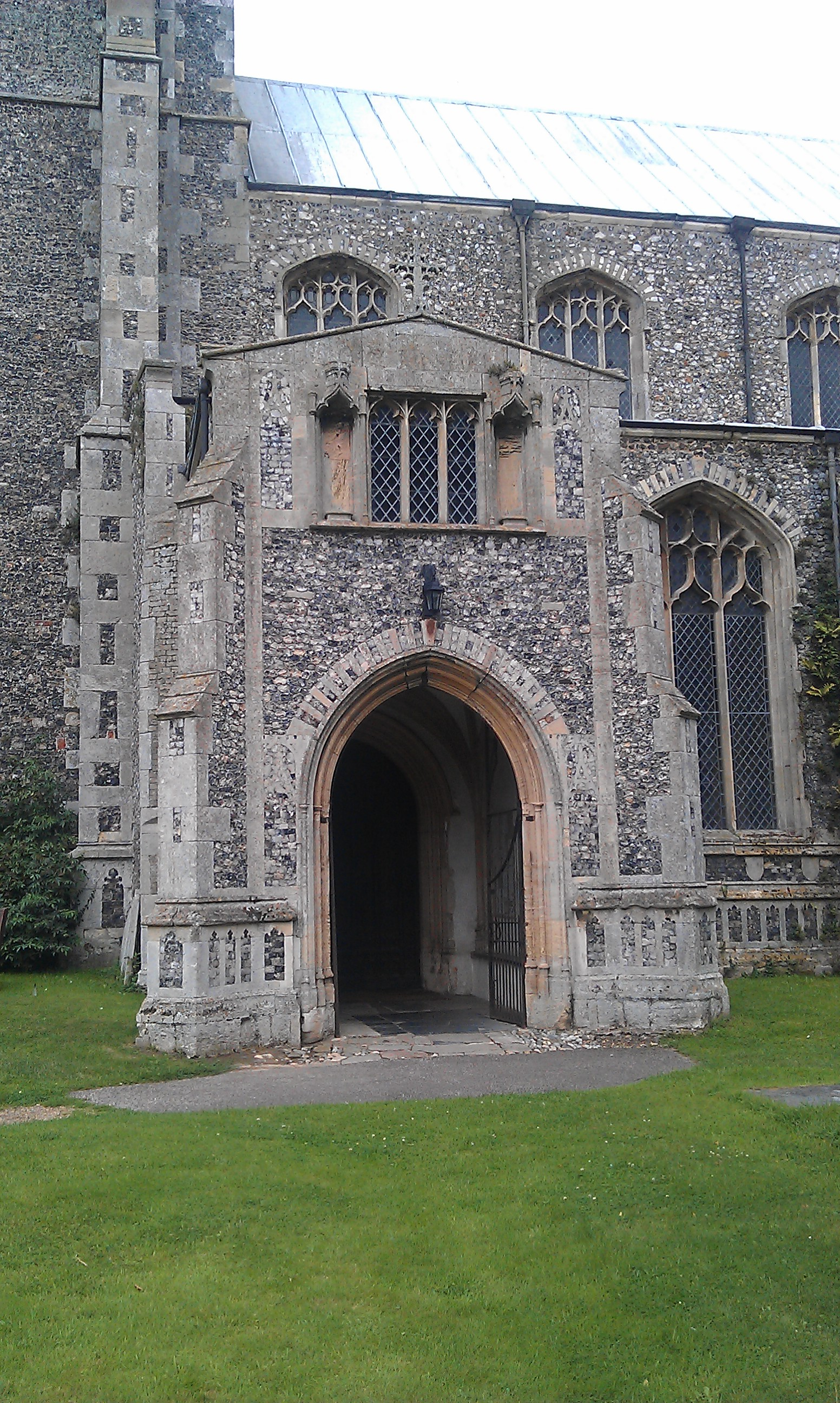
The Parvise at Martham Parish Church, Norfolk

== See also ==
- Church of the Holy Sepulchre
