= Odigitrievsky Cathedral =

- Одигитриевский собор (Russian)
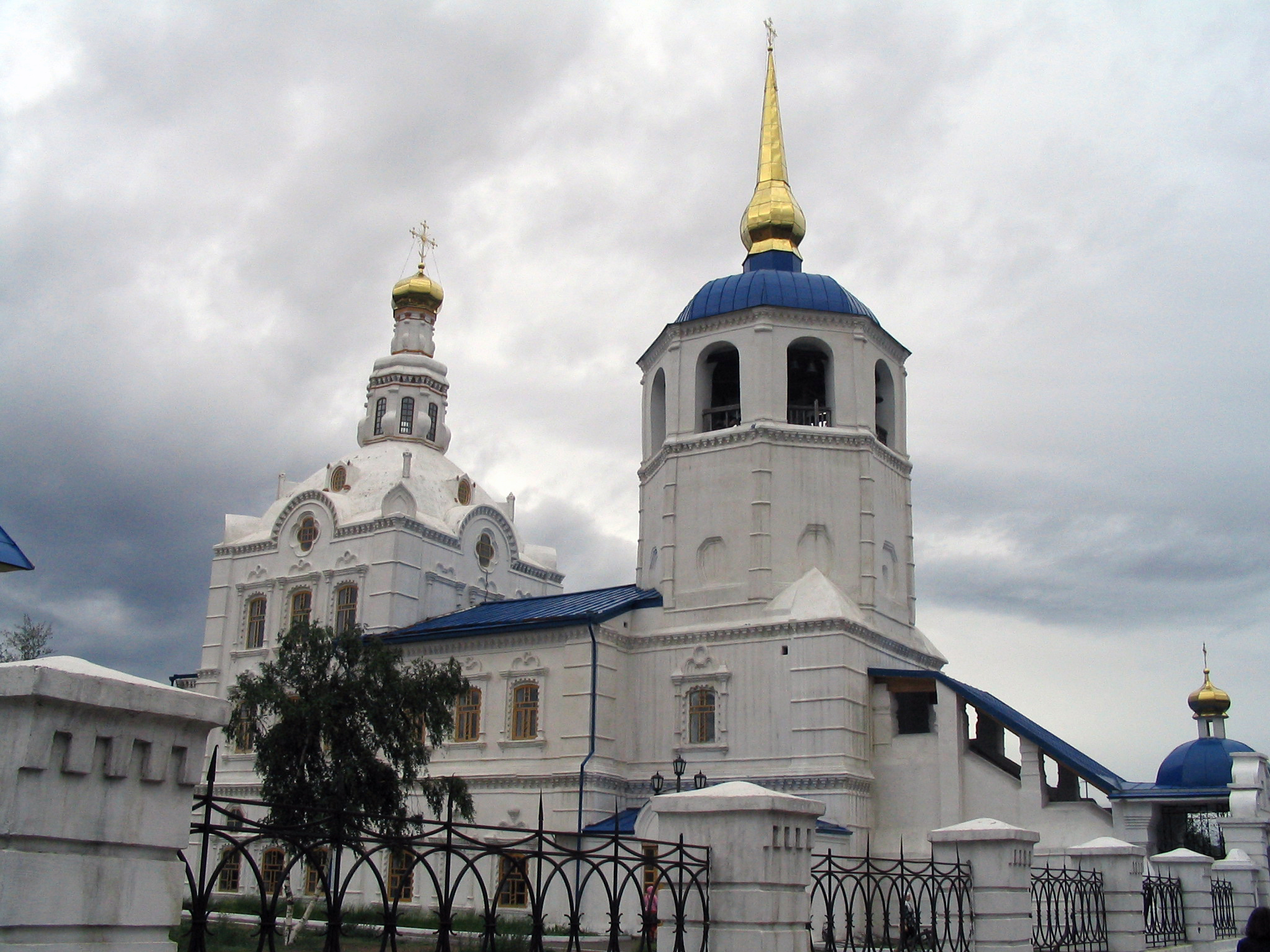

Religion
- Affiliation: Russian Orthodox

Location
- Location: Ulan Ude, Russia
- Interactive map of Odigitrievsky Cathedral
- Coordinates: 51°49′21″N 107°35′05″E

Architecture
- Style: Siberian Baroque
- Completed: 1741-1785

Odigitrievsky Cathedral (Russian: Одигитриевский собор), also known as the Cathedral of the Smolensk Icon of the Mother of God Hodegetria (Russian: Кафедральный собор Смоленской иконы Божией Матери Одигитрии) is an Orthodox church, a monument of architecture of the Siberian Baroque of the middle of the 18th century in Transbaikalia. It was built in 1741–1785 in the city of Verkhneudinsk (since 1934 – Ulan-Ude)

The first stone building of the city, located in the historical center of Ulan-Ude, on the right coast of the Uda river and near its confluence with the Selenga River.

== Architecture ==
The overall composition of the cathedral is three-part, symmetrical, with the components of the building strictly along the longitudinal axis from the west to east. All the objects of the temple, refectory and bell tower are merged and form a dense monolith.

Among them, the central place is occupied by a two-story column with a five-sided apse. The quadrangle is covered with a closed vault, crowned with a high dome without a roof and a light two-tiered lantern. Round pediments with four-petaled lucarnes along the axes of the quadrangle, curly kokoshniks at the corners form the competition of the walls, creating the effect of rounded corners and organically connected with the dome.

From the west, a bell tower of the “eight on four” type adjoins the refectory. A two-tiered octagon is placed above the square tiers. Each edge of the upper tier is cut through with arched openings, giving it expressiveness. The bell tower is completed with a helmet-shaped dome and a spire.

In the architecture of the facades and decorative details of the elements, there is a strong influence of Baroque forms. The decoration of the platbands is interesting by combining traditional Old Russian forms of the previous wooden cult architecture with Baroque elements. Rich plastic processing of facades with well-drawn brick details of window frames and other elements belongs to the traditions of patterned brick architecture of the 17th century, which confirms the influence of the architectural creativity of immigrants of the Russian North.

== History ==
In 1700, a wooden church of the Virgin-Vladimir was built on the site of the cathedral – a small one story cemetery church with a separate bell tower. To the south of the cathedral, on the site where the old church was located, two crosses were subsequently installed.

The construction of the cathedral began in 1741 and lasted 44 years. The builders and the first abbots were Hieromonk John and priest Maxim Fedorov. The temple was built at the expense of Verkhneudinsk and Kyakhta merchants and donations from citizens. Like many Siberian Cathedrals, it was built in two stages. On May 27, 1700, St. Sophrony, Bishop of Irkutsk and Nerchinsk, consecrated the warm lower chapel in the name of Epiphany of the Lord. The upper summer chapel in the name of the Smolensk Icon of the mother of God Odigitria was consecrated on May 3, 1785, by Bishop Mikhail.

In the mid-1860s, the large bell of the cathedral had weight of 105 poods (3,792 pounds or 1,720 kilograms). The oldest book in the library was the church charter of 1700, printed in Moscow. The main artistic and decorative element of the temple were gilded carved iconostases.

In 1818, cracks appeared in the foundation of the cathedral and its vault. There were more cracks after the earthquakes of 1862 and 1885. In 1863, the cathedral was completely renovated. In the 1860s, charitable organizations were opened at the temple.

At the end of the 19th and beginning of the 20th century, parochial schools were opened in 20 villages assigned to the parish of the cathedral.

During the First World War, the parish cared for the wounded soldiers and raised funds. The cathedral at that time owned 4,364 square fathoms of a farmstead in the city of Verkhneudinsk and 50 acres of arable land and lands in its suburbs.

In 1914, the parish had 1,833 male residents and 1,815 female residents.

On September 6, 1929, the Presidium of the Central Executive Committee of the Buryat-Mongolian ASSR issued a decree on the closure of the cathedral due to “the refusal of Odigitrievsk society of Believers to repair the temple”. All the church property was seized, the icons were destroyed and the building was transformed into a warehouse. The last rector of the cathedral, Gavrill Makushev, Archbishop of the Baikal region was executed in 1930. The same year, the bells were removed from the cathedral.

Construction personnel courses were organized in the church building, and since the end of 1935, an Anti-religious museum has been located in the cathedral. The museum was opened to visitors in November 1937. Until 1999, the funds of the museum of the history of Buryatia were stored in the cathedral.
