= Posolskoye =

Posolskoye Посольское
- Selo
- Location within Republic of Buryatia Location within Russia
- Coordinates: 52°01′N 106°11′E
- Country: Russia
- Region: Republic of Buryatia
- District: Kabansky District
- Time zone: UTC+8:00

Posolskoye (Russian: Посольское) is a rural locality (a selo) in Kabansky District, Republic of Buryatia, Russia. The population was 782 as of 2010. There are 9 streets.

== Geography ==
Posolskoye is located 42 km west of Kabansk (the district's administrative centre) by road. Bolshaya Rechka is the nearest rural locality.
