= Jill Burke =

British art historian

Jill Burke FBA
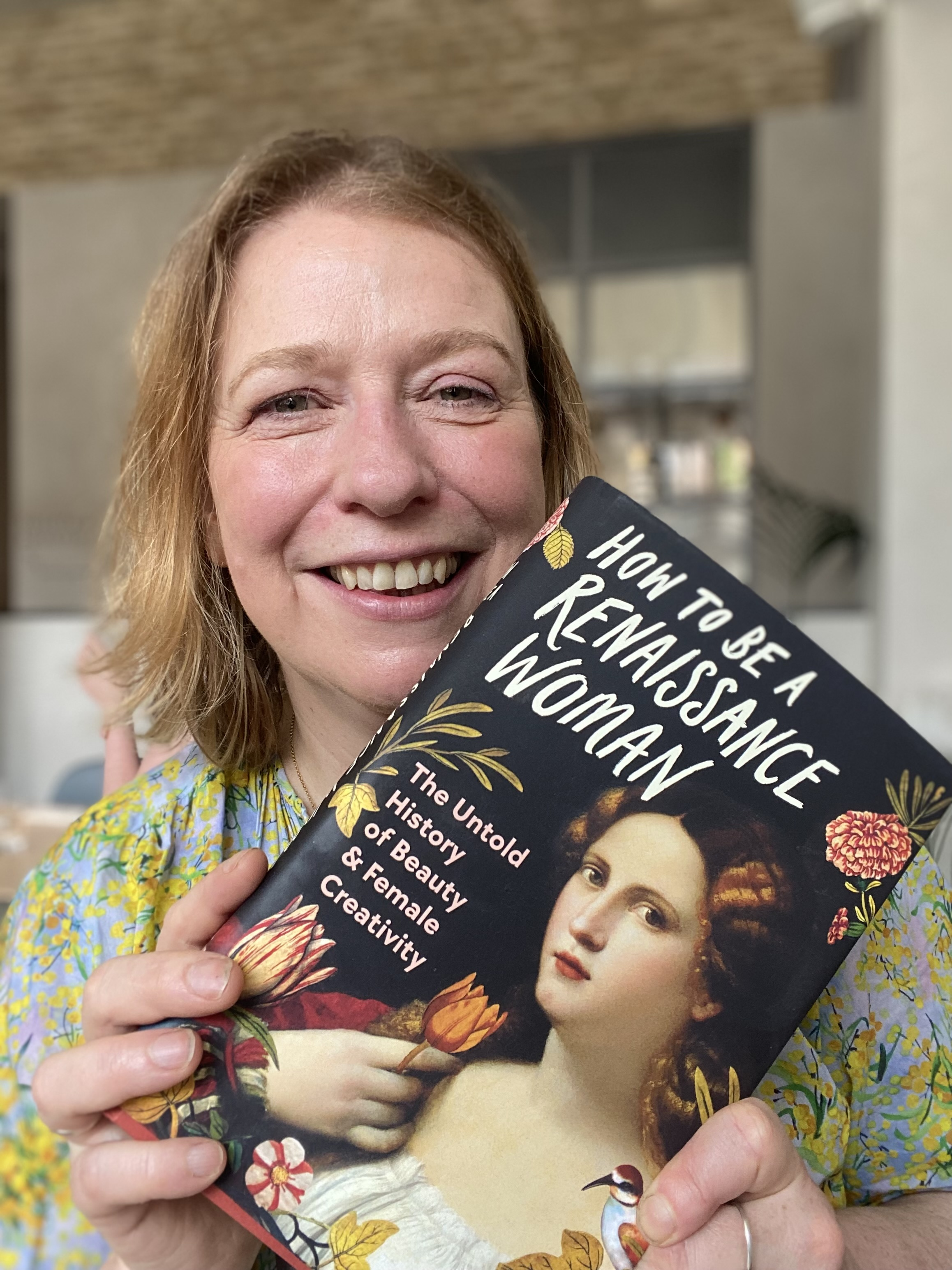
- Jill Burke with her book, How to Be A Renaissance Woman in 2023
- Education: Trinity College Oxford; Courtauld Institute of Art
- Occupations: Historian, writer

Jill Burke FBA is a British historian, art historian and writer best known for her work on the art and culture of Renaissance Italy.

She is Professor of Renaissance Visual and Material Culture in the University of Edinburgh School of History, Classics and Archaeology. Her work has appeared in The Guardian and The Daily Telegraph, and BBC Radio 4.

== Biography ==
Burke was born in Leeds, UK and studied at Benton Park School. She completed her undergraduate studies in Modern History at Trinity College Oxford, then went on to an MA and then PhD at Courtauld Institute of Art.

She was a postdoctoral fellow at Villa I Tatti, the Harvard University Center for Italian Renaissance research 2000–2001 and joined History of Art at the University of Edinburgh as a Research Fellow in 2003, then going on to becoming a lecturer, senior lecturer and chair at Edinburgh College of Art after the 2011 merger between the two institutions. She moved to the History department in 2024.

== Works ==
- Changing Patrons: Social Identity and the Visual Arts in Renaissance Florence, 2004. ISBN 9780271023625
- edited Rethinking the High Renaissance, Routledge, 2012. ISBN 9781409425588
- The Italian Renaissance Nude, Yale University Press, 2018. ISBN 9780300201567
- co-edited The Renaissance Nude, 2018–2019,
- How to Be a Renaissance Woman, 2024 ISBN 9781639365906
