= Hugh Honour =

British art historian

Hugh Honour

Hugh Honour FRSL (26 September 1927 – 19 May 2016) was a British art historian, known for his writing partnership with John Fleming. Their A World History of Art (a.k.a. The Visual Arts: A History), is now in its seventh edition and Honour's Chinoiserie: The Vision of Cathay (1961) first set the phenomenon of chinoiserie in its European cultural context.

== Early life ==
Honour was born in Eastbourne, Sussex, to Herbert and Dorothy (Withers) Honour. After The King's School, Canterbury, he read English at St Catharine's College, Cambridge, graduating with a Bachelor of Arts degree. While at Cambridge, Honour met John Fleming, a solicitor and amateur art historian, who would become Honour's life partner. Honour accepted a position as Assistant director of Leeds City Art Gallery and Temple Newsam House but left after one year to join Fleming in Italy.

== Life in Italy ==
Living in Asolo near Venice, Honour and Fleming began a highly productive writing and publishing partnership, in which Fleming managed the business side of their enterprise and Honour wrote the books. They were commissioned by publisher Allen Lane to edit the Style and Civilisation series (begun 1967), which was published by Penguin Books. Under Honour's editorial guidance, the Style and Civilisation series published in quick succession a group of texts that have attained the status of classics, including John Shearman's Mannerism, George Henderson's Gothic, and Linda Nochlin's Realism. Honour's contribution, the highly regarded Neo-Classicism (1968), single-handedly resuscitated the scholarly reputation of the period, which had been despised or ignored during the modernist ascendancy. Romanticism, Honour's companion to Neo-Classicism, was published in 1979, long after the demise of the series.

Honour and Fleming also supervised the Architect and Society series (begun 1966); and the Art in Context series (begun 1972) for Penguin. In 1966, they revised and completed Nikolaus Pevsner's The Penguin Dictionary of Architecture (2nd edition 1972), and in 1977 they published The Penguin Dictionary of Decorative Arts. The couple's book, A World History of Art (also known as The Visual Arts: A History), was published in 1982, the first survey of global art history, including Western, Asian, African, Pre-Columbian and Native American art. It is now in its 7th edition. Honour wrote Venetian Hours of Henry James, Whistler and Sargent (1991) and edited the writings of the Neoclassical sculptor Antonio Canova (1994).

In 1962, Honour and Fleming moved to Villa Marchiò outside Lucca (a city favoured by British expatriates), where they lived together until Fleming died in 2001 and where Honour lived until his death on 19 May 2016. Honour was elected in 1972 as a Fellow of the Royal Society of Literature.

== Selected publications ==
Books

- Horace Walpole. 1957.
- The Companion Guide to Venice. 1965.
- Romanticism. 1979
- Neo-Classicism (Style and Civilization). 1968.
- Chinoiserie: The Vision of Cathay. 1961.
- The Companion Guide to Venice. 1965. ISBN 1900639246
- Penguin Dictionary of Architecture. 1966. (With Nikolaus Pevsner and John Fleming)
  - -do.-2nd edition, 1972.
- The Penguin Dictionary of Decorative Arts. London: Allen Lane, 1977. (With John Fleming) ISBN 0713909412
- A World History of Art. 1982. (With John Fleming)
- The Venetian Hours of Henry James, Whistler, and Sargent. 1991. (With John Fleming)
- The Visual Arts: a history. 1995. (With John Fleming)
- The Image of the Black in Western Art, Volume 4: From the American Revolution to World War One.
- The New Golden Land: European images of America from the discoveries to the present time. London: Allen Lane, 1976.

Articles

- "Canova and the Anglo-Romans. Part I: The First Visit to Rome. Part II: The First Years in Rome." The Connoisseur, May and December 1959. 227–228.
- "Canova's Studio Practice. I: The Early Years. II: 1792–1822." The Burlington Magazine, CXIV, 1972. 147–159, 214–229.
