= List of museums in Rutland =

This list of museums in Rutland, England contains museums which are defined for this context as institutions (including nonprofit organizations, government entities, and private businesses) that collect and care for objects of cultural, artistic, scientific, or historical interest and make their collections or related exhibits available for public viewing. Also included are non-profit art galleries and university art galleries. Museums that exist only in cyberspace (i.e., virtual museums) are not included.

Name	Image	Town/City	Type	Summary
Lyddington Bede House		Lyddington	Historic house	Operated by English Heritage, late medieval wing of a palace belonging to the Bishops of Lincoln, later an almshouse
Oakham Castle		Oakham	Historic house	12th-century great hall with collection of noble horseshoes, 12th-century sculptures
Rocks by Rail		Cottesmore	Railway	Heritage railway, museum with industrial locomotives and mineral wagons from mines, quarry vehicles
Rutland County Museum		Oakham	Local	Local history, archaeology, rural life, trades, agriculture equipment

== Defunct museums ==
- Normanton Church Museum, Normanton, closed in 1999. Displays featured local history, fossils, and the construction of Rutland Water.

== See also ==
- Category:Tourist attractions in Rutland
