= Dormition Cathedral, Volodymyr =

Dormition Cathedral
- Holy Dormition Cathedral
- Свято-Успенський собор
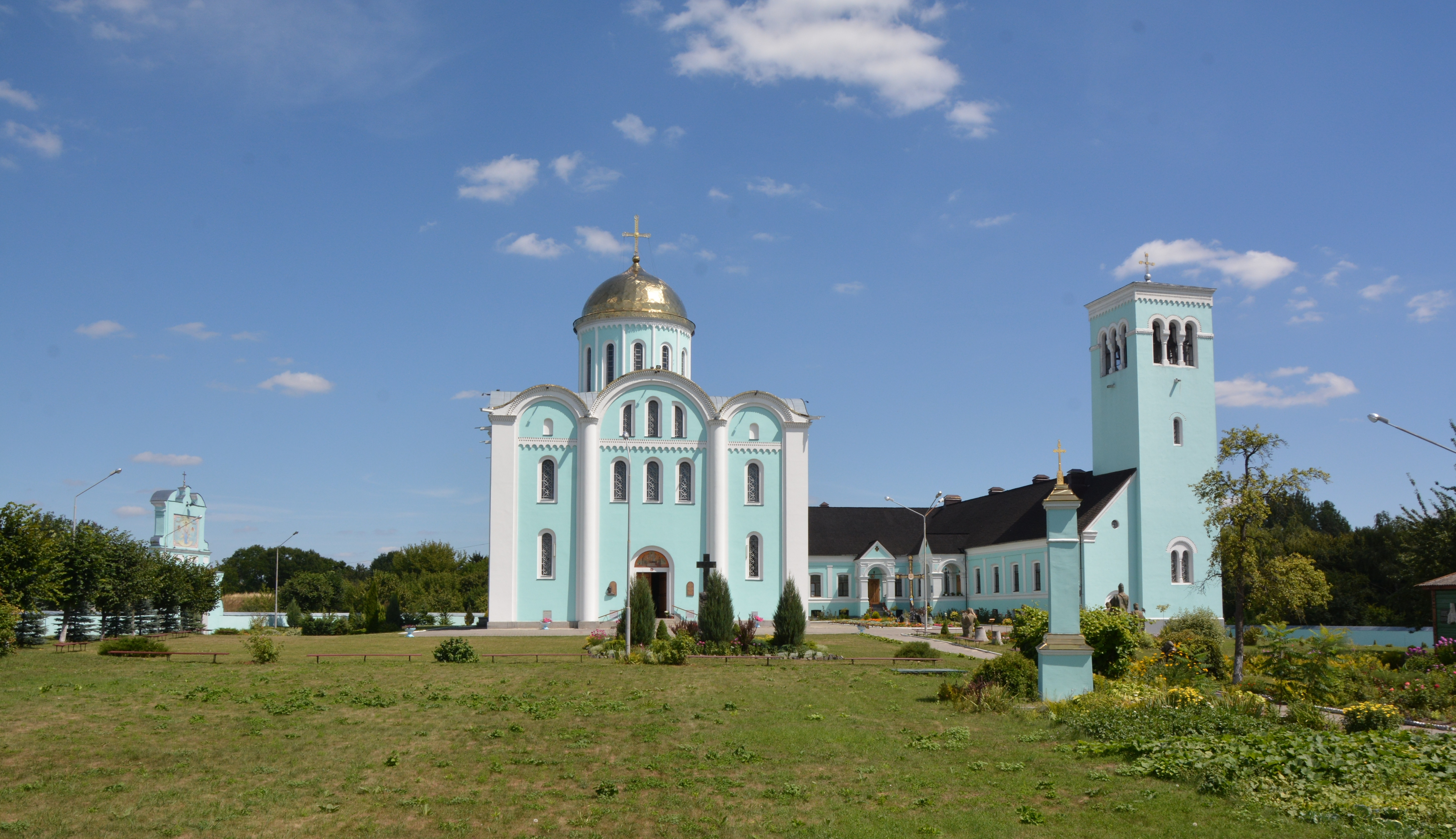
- The Dormition Cathedral and the Bishop's Palace
- Dormition Cathedral
- 50°50′34″N 24°18′54″E
- Location: Volodymyr, Volyn Oblast, Ukraine
- Address: Soborna Street, 25
- Denomination: Orthodox Church of Ukraine

History
- Founder: Mstislav II of Kiev

Architecture
- Groundbreaking: 1156
- Completed: 1160

Specifications
- Height: 18.5 m

Immovable Monument of National Significance of Ukraine
- Official name: Успенський собор (Мстиславів храм) (Dormition Cathedral (Mstislav's Church))
- Type: Architecture
- Reference no.: 030024/1

The Dormition Cathedral is a cathedral and architectural monument in Volodymyr, Ukraine. It is state property, but in service of the Volodymyr-Volynskyi eparchy of the Orthodox Church of Ukraine. Its oldest parts date back to the 12th century, making it the only building of Kievan Rus' in Volyn Oblast.

== History ==
The church was built during the reign of the Volyn prince Mstislav II Izyaslavych in 1160. The walls of the church are divided by arches on half columns and had frescoes. It was rebuilt in the 18th century. The general appearance is static and monumental, despite the controversial reconstruction carried out in 1896–1900 by architects Adrian Prakhov and Grigory Kotov.

In 1156, the great-grandson of Vladimir II Monomakh, Mstislav II Izyaslavych, who was a regional prince in Volodymyr, and later the Grand Prince of Kiev, built a new church in honor of the Dormition of the Blessed Virgin Mary. The consecration of the church was done after its painting in 1160. After the consecration, the church became a cathedral, continuing the history of the first episcopal see of the Volyn Diocese, founded on these lands in 992. In honor of the 1000th anniversary of the Volyn Diocese, a commemorative cross was erected near the cathedral in 1992. The cathedral was the burial place of princes, boyars and bishops. Under the church there are 6 grand princely, 2 episcopal and many noble persons' tombs. Prince Mstislav II, the builder of the church, is also buried here. It was ravaged by the hordes of Batu Khan and restored again. In the first half of the 15th century, it was looted, and rebuilt again at the end of the century through the efforts of Bishop Vasian of Volodymyr.

In 1596, when the Bishop of Volodymyr Hypatius Pociej accepted the Union of Brest, the church became a uniate church. During the fire of 1683, which devastated the entire city, the cathedral suffered greatly and was restored only in 1753. In 1772, the cathedral fell into disrepair, and it was used as a warehouse. By 1829, it had become a complete ruin—the vaults and dome had collapsed. The cathedral owes its revival to the efforts of the St. Volodymyr Brotherhood, opened in December 1887 in Volodymyr, which set itself religious, educational and church-planning tasks. In 1896, a project for the "restoration" of the church by architect Grigory Kotov was adopted. In 1896–1900, the cathedral was rebuilt in the pseudo-Byzantine style. The consecration of the renovated church has become a local holiday.

11 May 2010 marked the 850th anniversary of the cathedral's construction. Celebrations were held in the city, led by the Primate of the Ukrainian Orthodox Church, His Beatitude Metropolitan Volodymyr (Sabodan).

Until October 2025 the cathedral was under the control of the Ukrainian Orthodox Church (Moscow Patriarchate). On 11 October 2025, by a court decision, the building was brought under state ownership. (Note: Ukrainian MP Ihor Huz called this change of ownership "historical justice". He claimed: "The stronghold of the Moscow Patriarchate, which stood for years in the very heart of the ancient city, fell.") Clerics of the Moscow Patriarchate tried to prevent the entry of government official into the cathedral by barricading the central passage with benches.

The (regional) state administration of Volyn Oblast handed the Dormition Cathedral to the Orthodox Church of Ukraine in January 2026.

The Dormition Cathedral is an architectural monument of Ukraine and is inscribed on the State Register of Immovable Monuments of Ukraine and is owned by the state.

== Relics ==
- Bratska Icon of the Virgin Mary;
- Icon of Theotokos from Pochaiv;
- 14th-century Cross-Golgotha
- Ark with a portion of the relics of the Hieromartyr Thaddeus (Uspensky), Archbishop of Tver, Bishop of Volodymyr-Volynskyi

== Architecture ==
The Dormition Cathedral is a large six-columned triapse church. Its narthex is separated from the main building by a wall. The total external length of the building is 34.7 m, width 20.6 m, azimuth 79°. The size of the under-domed space along the church is 8 m, and across is 7.45 m. The thickness of the walls is 1.5–1.7 m. The height of the church to the top of the central narthex is about 18.5 m. The ancient vaults have not been preserved. On the western and eastern facades, the narthexes are not windows, but blind niches; this indicates that the corner cylindrical vaults were turned. There are lofts in the western part of the church. The vaults that supported the lateral divisions of theloft, judging by the preserved medieval parts, were cruciform. The middle division of the loft may have rested on wooden beams. There was no ladder in the cathedral, and the lofts were accessed through the doors of the second floor of the southern facade, apparently, after entering from the palace. The outer corner lesenes of the temple are flat, and the intermediate ones are with powerful half-columns. Three portals lead into the building, with a two-step profile. The windows are narrow, with a semicircular ending, except in the central narthex, where there are 3 windows each, and this shape is only in the middle, while the side ones end in a quarter of a circle. At the base of the zakomaras on three facades, except for the eastern one, there is an arcature belt with a double porebryk.

The walls of the temple are made of bricks in the even-layer masonry technique. The size of the bricks is approximately 4.5×22–23×32.5–35.5; they are well-fired and strong. On some bricks, there are wavy parallel lines on one of the beds, and on several there are large princely signs in the form of a bident. There are trapezoidal bricks and narrow ones with a wedge-shaped end. The thickness of the mortar joints in the masonry is approximately equal to the thickness of the brick. The mortar is made of lime and is pink from the cement. Marks from rotten wood in the walls were located. Acoustic jars used in the masonry of the vaults were also found. The foundations are strip-shaped, 2–3 m deep, made of rubble. Above them is a pavement of several rows of bricks on mortar. The floor of the church was covered with glazed ceramic tiles. The interior is painted with frescoes, some parts of which were still preserved until the time of restoration in the central apse and on the slopes of the windows. The cathedral had arched niches for burials. One of the burials probably contained the remains of Prince Volodymyr Vasylkovych.

== Restorations ==
The construction of the central church of the Principality of Volodymyr — the Dormition Cathedral — attracted the close attention of chroniclers and is therefore reflected in many chronicles. The entry in the Laurentian Chronicle reports the foundation of the cathedral on April 8, 1158. The Avraamka Chronicle indicates a different day of foundation, May 8. The completion of construction is noted in 1160:

Создана бысть церки святая Богородица в Володимери… князем Андреем; и украси ю дивно… и верх ея позлати... приведе ему бог из всех земель мастеры
("The Church of Saint Theotokos was built in Volodymyr... by prince Andrey; and he decorated it wonderfully... and gilded its roof... God brought him masters from all lands")

The painting of the church was carried out in 1161, and was finished in August.

In 1185 the cathedral was badly damaged by fire. After the fire it was restored, and in 1189 the cathedral was consecrated again.

During the great fire in 1193, the church was likely not damaged, but it was whitewashed next year.

In 13th century, several princes of Volodymyr were buried here, and in 1237, some decoration and painting was carried out. In 1238, during the Mongol Invasion, the cathedral was looted and burned. It was not restored until 1280, when Metropolitan Kyrylo covered the domes in tin.

In 1293, the Mongols destroyed the city once again.

Various repairs and reconstructions were carried out in the cathedral in the 14th century, and in 1408 Andrei Rublev and Danylo Chorny painted the church again. Later, the cathedral suffered from robberies and fires several more times, but each time it was repaired. Major repairs were carried out in 1725–1734 and 1888–1891, and during the latter, the architect K. O. Karabut restored the ancient forms of the building. The study of the monument makes it possible to generally imagine the original appearance of the cathedral, built in 1158–1160.

Carved stones were used in the decoration of the facades, some of which survived on the walls of the cathedral in 1185–1189. The zakomaras of the facades were decorated, judging by the chronicle, with gilded images. Fragments of carved drainage holes with traces of their fittings, gilded with copper, have been found. The massive drum of the original cathedral is decorated with 24 columns with carved capitals. The cornice of the drum consists of serrated triangles, a strip of curbstone and a final belt of small arches. The walls between the windows of the drum were covered with gilded copper. The dome of the cathedral was also covered with the same copper. The foundations of the narthex have been uncovered in front of the northern portal of the original cathedral; it can be assumed that the vestibule was in front of all three portals. The question of the entrance to the choirs remains open. Judging by the remains of the foundation discovered north of the northwestern division of the original church, there were passages near the cathedral that directly connected it to the bishop's palace, and therefore it may not have had a special ladder for climbing to the lofts.

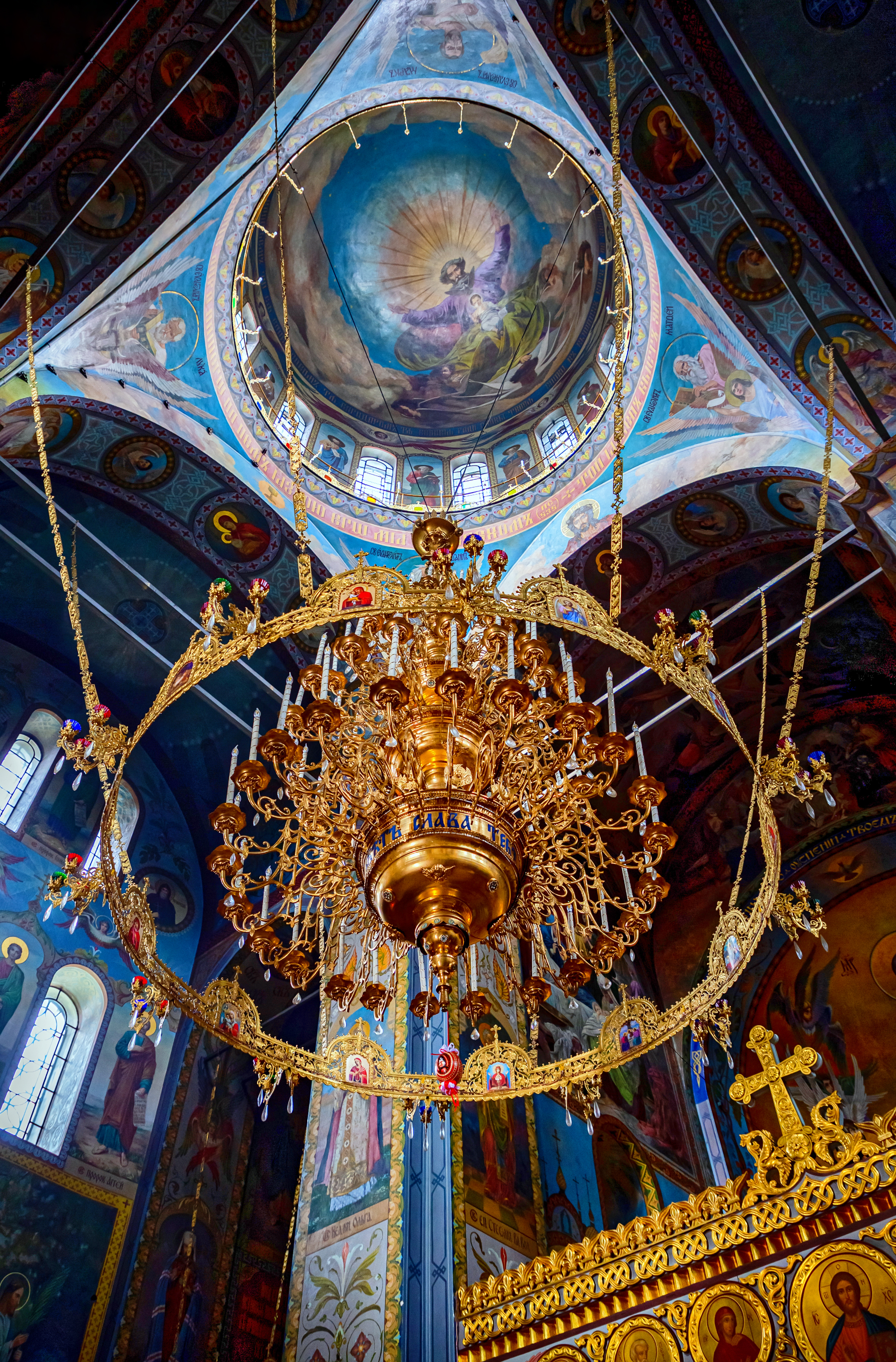
Interior of the cathedral in 2021

During the reconstruction of the cathedral in 1185-1189, the architect built the original building with additional divisions from the north, west and south, placing four new domes at the corners and thus transforming the cathedral into a five-nave, five-dome church. The outer walls of the original building were cut through with wide openings to the entire height of the cathedral, and in the western part, where the lofts were located, two-tiered openings were made — under the lofts and above them. The pillars formed from the walls of the original cathedral were strengthened with pylons, which are connected by arches to the new outer walls. The apses of the original church were broken and new ones were built, pushed much further to the east. After the reconstruction, the width of the cathedral became 31.3 m, and the length (with apses) was 37.8 m. The thickness of the outer walls is 1.7–1.8 m. The attached divisions played the role of galleries-tombs. In their walls were placed arched niches for burials. These galleries were probably painted in 1237.

During the reconstruction of the cathedral, the lofts were extended by one division to the north and south. These divisions are supported by cross vaults. The question of stairs for climbing to the choirs is unclear for the rebuilt building as well. The floors of the side annexes and apses were covered with glazed ceramic tiles. It is not known whether the copper floor of the temple, which is mentioned in the chronicle under 1293 belonged to the original cathedral or to the time of the reconstruction. Externally, the new cathedral generally repeated the forms of the original church. Its walls are divided by two-tiered pilasters with half-columns, and an arcature-columnar belt runs along the middle of the height. The same belt forms the top of the apses. In addition to the three main portals on the western facade, there are 2 more side portals, several smaller ones. All portals of the temple are perspective. The windows of the second tier, and the first (at the level of the arcature-columnar belt) are simple slit-shaped. Stone carvings decorate the portals, the capitals of the columns on the pilasters, the capitals of the columns and the consoles of the arcaded-columned belt. Some carved stones embedded in the wall were probably transferred here from the original building. The arcaded-columned belt was once painted.

The vaults of the attached parts are slightly lower than the vaults of the original building, they do not cover the top of the narthex of this central volume. Therefore, the upper part of the cathedral became stepped. The eastern pair of side chapters is located not above square, but above elongated rectangular rooms, and additional spring arches were introduced here to support the drums. During the repair of the covering of the central dome at the end of the 19th century, it turned out that the copper sheets of the dome are largely ancient; these sheets had serial digital marks. The crosses of the cathedral were made of bar iron and covered with slotted sheets of gilded copper. The cathedral is composed of well-hewn limestone squares with the middle of the walls covered with untreated stones on mortar. The presence of oak ties is noted in the walls. Porous tuff was used in the masonry of the domes.

Excavations carried out in 1951 by A. V. Stoletov in the northern nave of the cathedral made it possible to clarify the arrangement of the foundations. The foundation of the original cathedral turned out to be composed of stones without a binding substance. Above the foundation is a layer of fine limestone on a lime mortar. The mortar from this layer partially spilled into the upper part of the cobblestone foundation; it is very strong, with small pieces of coal. Under the northern wall of the northern narthex, the foundation was about 1.9 m deep, and the remains of oak beds were discovered at its base. The foundation of the cathedral from 1185–1189 was composed of limestone. In the lower part of the foundation, the stones are almost untreated, higher up they are tightly fitted, and cleanly hewn at the uppermost row. The entire foundation is made on a lime mortar; its depth is 1.78 m. There is information that the remains of oak beds were discovered in the northern part of the church under the foundation.

After thorough research of the cathedral, a decision was made to restore it in original forms. Although the exact design of the medieval building was not known, it could be reconstructed based on known samples of buildings of the Kievan Rus' period.

Professor A. V. Prakhov created a reconstruction project. He proposed to leave the later addition from the west. The cathedral, according to his plan, was to be five-domed. The main dome would be made in the form of a mitre, and the rest in the form of a skufia. In an explanatory note, the scientist wrote that he took the Greek–Rus' forms of the 12th century as a basis.

In 1891, the Dormition Cathedral was examined by M. T. Preobrazhensky, and in 1893, the Imperial Archaeological Commission sent academicians G. I. Kotov and V. V. Suslov to Volodymyr-Volynskyi. Kotov and his assistants began working on a reconstruction project, which was much more detailed. He emphasized the need to remove all later additions and layers and provided for the restoration of the original form of the cathedral. The project was approved in 1896 by the archaeological commission. The Holy Synod entrusted the restoration of the church to the academician of architecture Grigory Ivanovich Kotov.

== Gallery ==
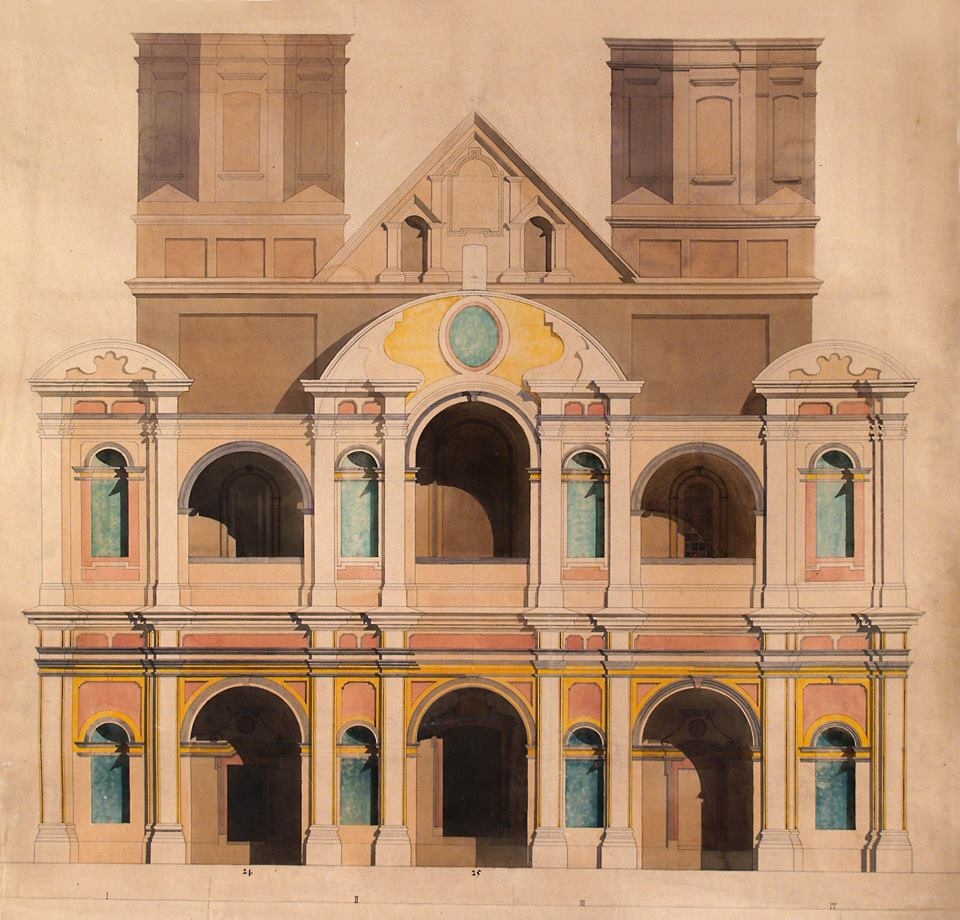
Drawing of the main façade in 1886

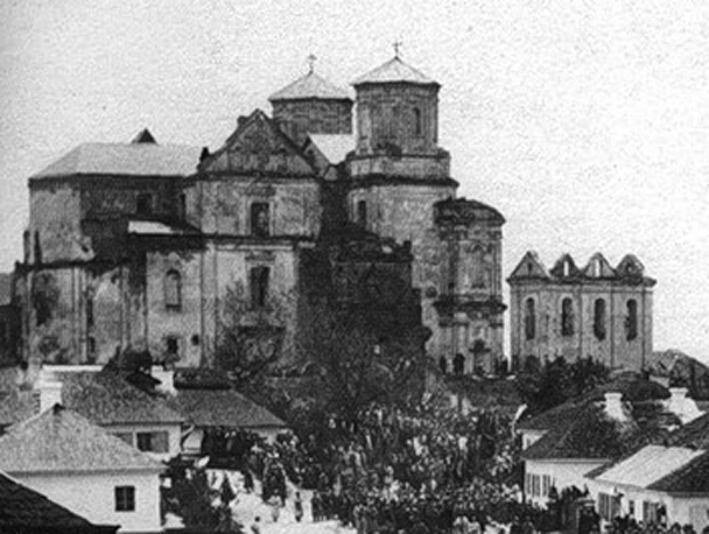
The cathedral in 1892

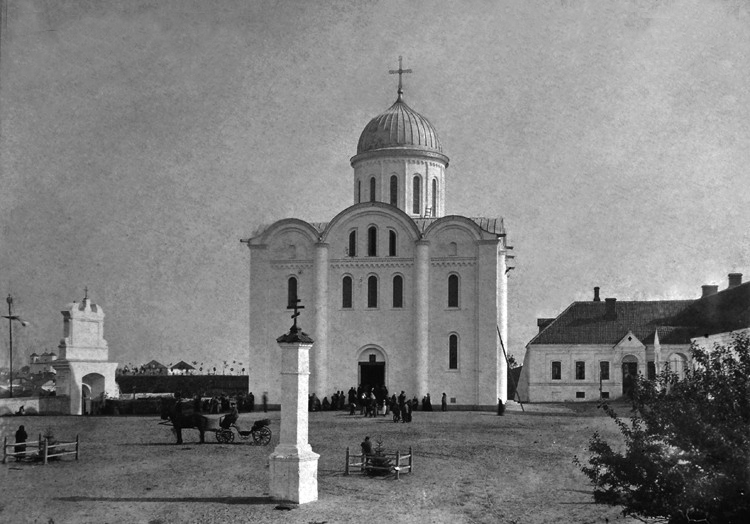
The cathedral after the reconstruction in 1900

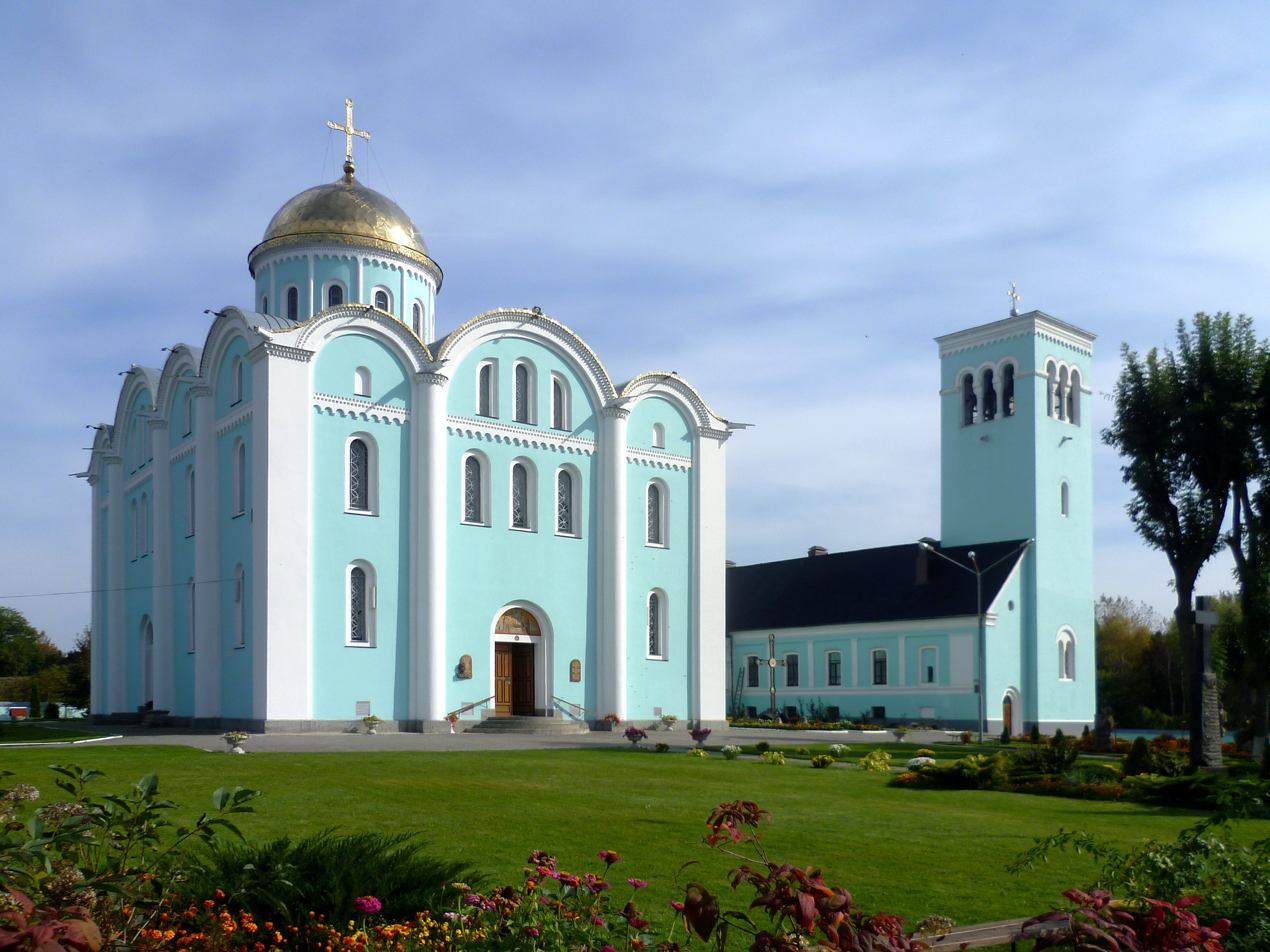
Modern view of the building

== See also ==
- List of buildings of pre-Mongol Rus'
- Dormition Church, Dorohobuzh
- St. Pantaleon Church, Shevchenkove

== Sources and literature ==
- Гаврилюк С. В. Відновлення Успенського собору м. Володимира-Волинського — унікальної пам'ятки Київської Русі: концепція, здійснення, результати.
- Енциклопедія українознавства : Словникова частина : [в 11 т.] / Наукове товариство імені Шевченка ; гол. ред. проф., д-р Володимир Кубійович. — Париж — Нью-Йорк : Молоде життя, 1955—1995. — ISBN 5-7707-4049-3.
- Піскова Е. М. ДАВНЬОСХОВИЩЕ СВЯТО-ВОЛОДИМИРСЬКОГО ПРАВОСЛАВНОГО братства // Енциклопедія історії України : у 10 т. / редкол.: В. А. Смолій (голова) та ін. ; Інститут історії України НАН України. — К. : Наукова думка, 2004. — Т. 2 : Г — Д. — С. 277. — ISBN 966-00-0405-2.
- П. А. Ричков. УСПЕНСЬКИЙ СОБОР, Володимир Волинський // Енциклопедія історії України : у 10 т. / редкол.: В. А. Смолій (голова) та ін. ; Інститут історії України НАН України. — К. : Наукова думка, 2013. — Т. 10 : Т — Я. — С. 249. — ISBN 978-966-00-1359-9.
- Мандзюк Ф. Г. — «Володимир-Волинський Свято-Успенський собор»: історичний нарис. Луцьк: Вісник і К, 2001. — 80 с.
- Раппопорт П.А. Русская архитектура X—XIII вв. Каталог памятников. Л., 1982. (переклад джерела з російської мови)
