= Acoustic jar =

Ceramic vessels found set into the walls of medieval churches

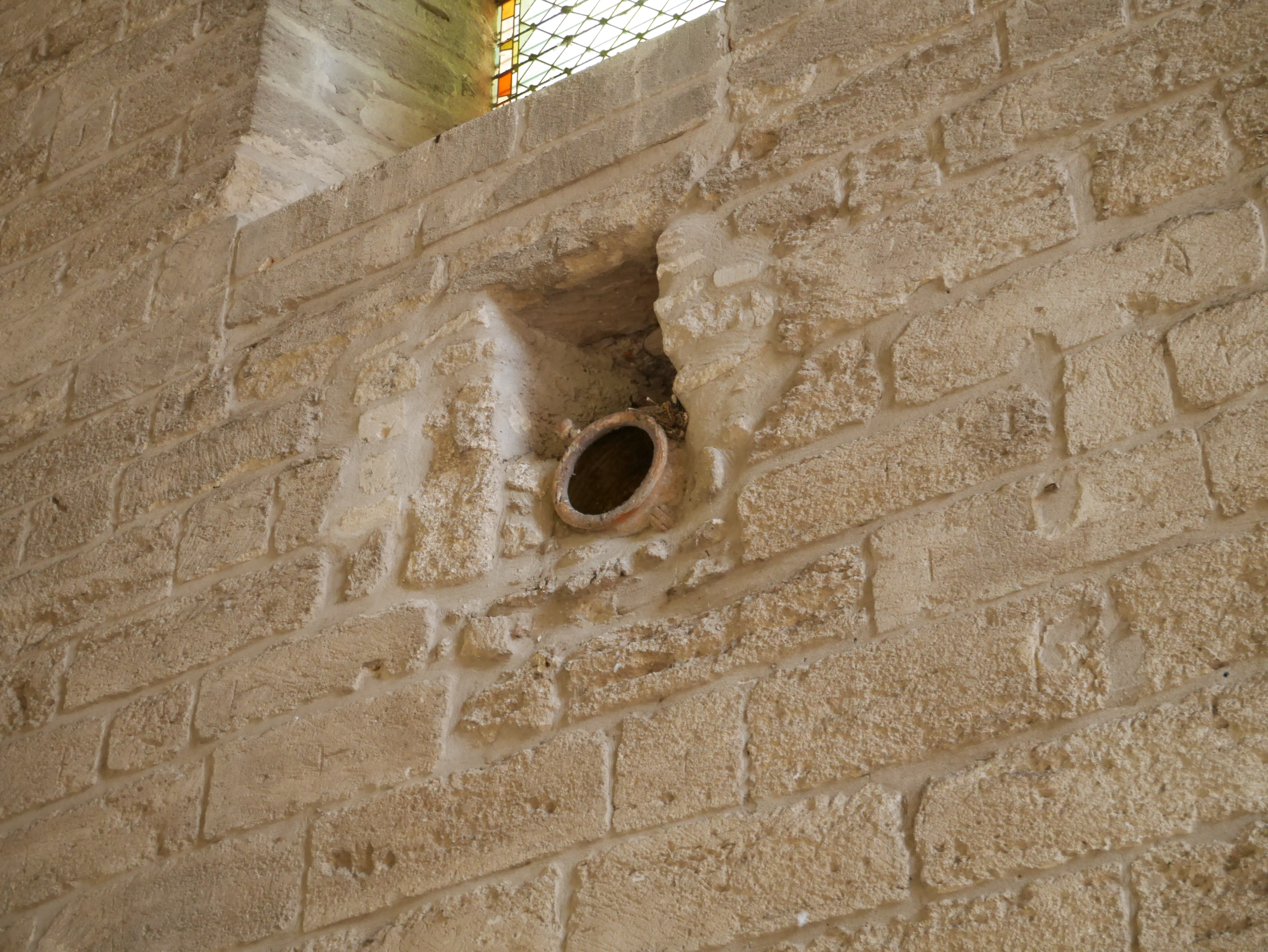
Resonance amphora embedded in the wall of the church of the Chartreuse Notre-Dame-du-Val-de-Bénédiction, Villeneuve-lès-Avignon.

An acoustic jar, also known by the Greek name echea (ηχεία, literally echoers), or sounding vases, are ceramic vessels found set into the walls, ceilings, and sometimes floors, of medieval churches. They are believed to have been intended to improve the sound of singing, and to have been inspired by the theories of the Roman writer Vitruvius, who described their use in Greek and Roman theatres. No examples from the ancient world have survived, but examples from the Middle Ages are found in about 200 churches, about half of them in France.

== Construction ==
The vessels mentioned by Vitruvius in his De architectura are made of bronze and designed specifically for each unique theatre. They were placed in niches between the theatre's seats, specifically so that nothing was touching them. They used mathematical calculations to decide where they should be placed. "They should be set upside down, and be supported on the side facing the stage by wedges not less than half a foot high."

They were typically made of bronze, but could also be made of earthenware.

== History ==
=== Classical Antiquity ===
The use of tuned bronze vases set in niches to modify the acoustics in Greek and Roman theatre is described by the Roman writer Vitruvius. Vitruvius mentions the Roman general Lucius Mummius, who destroyed the city of Corinth and its theatre, and then brought the remains of the building's bronze echeas back to Rome. After selling the fragments, Mummius used the money to make a dedicatory offering at the temple of Luna.

No original examples survive from the ancient world.

=== Middle Ages ===
In the Middle Ages the idea of the acoustic vessel re-emerged. Examples have been found in around 200 churches, about half of them in France. The vessels vary greatly in shape and positioning, but, unlike those described by Vitruvius they are ceramic, and are enclosed within the fabric of building. The function of the jars was established with the discovery of a reference in the Chronicle of the Celestins of Metz. The chronicler recorded that, in 1432:

on the vigil of the Assumption, after brother Odo le Roy, the prior, had returned from the before-mentioned general chapter, it was ordered that pots should be put into the choir of the church of this place, he stating that he had seen such in a church elsewhere thinking that they made the singing better, and resound more, they were put up there in one day, by taking as many workmen as were necessary.

The use of the jars was said to be common in Brittany, and around Clisson, in the Loire Inferieure. In the Clisson area, they were usually found in horizontal rows at a height of about three metres above floor level. In 1859 a correspondent to Archaeologia Cambrensis reported that at Pallet there was "a modern chapel, with earthenware vessels inserted in the walls of the choir, expressly for acoustic purposes". In England, a set of eleven jars survives high in the chancel walls of St Andrew's Church at Lyddington, Rutland.

At St Peter Mancroft in Norwich two L-shaped trenches accommodating a number of acoustic jars were discovered beneath the wooden floor on which the choir stalls had previously stood. The trenches had rubble walls and concrete bottoms, and the surfaces were rendered over. Earthenware jars were built into the walls at intervals of about three feet, with the mouths facing into the trench. The jars were about 9 ½ inches long, and 8 inches across at their widest, narrowing to 6 inches at the mouth. A similar discovery was made at St Peter Parmentergate in the same city. At Fountains Abbey, in Yorkshire several earthenware vessels were discovered mortared into the base of the choir screen, their necks protruding through the stonework.

== Utility ==
Both their use in ancient times and their usefulness have been debated. Thomas Noble Howe wrote in his commentary on Vitruvius' De architectura, "These vessels, bronze or clay, may be another example of Vitruvius singling out a highly technical feature of Greek architecture that was uncommon, but between eight and sixteen potential sites with evidence of echea have been identified. It is debatable whether such vessels amplified or deadened sound." Echea were used with a "due regard to the laws and harmony of physics," according to Vitruvius. There is also the possibility that echea were not used at all. Brill suggests that, "It is possible that Vitruvius, following the teachings on harmony by Aristoxenus, took speculation for reality."

The utility of the medieval jars has also been called into question. The Chronicler of Metz, in the only medieval source on the purpose of the jars, mocks the prior for believing that they might have improved the sound of the choir, and the archaeologist Ralph Merrifield suggested that their use might have owed more to a tradition of votive deposits than to the theories of Vitruvius.

From an acoustical perspective, there is little consensus on the effect of echea, and it is an active area of research for certain archaeoacousticians. Modern experiments have indicated that their effect would have been to absorb the resonance of certain frequencies (acting as a Helmholtz resonator) rather than to amplify sound. However, in 2011, at The Acoustics of Ancient Theatres conference, P. Karampatzakis and V. Zafranas presented evidence that Vitruvius' account of sound amplification was possible, through the construction of a hypothetical model of an ancient acoustic vase.

== Modern uses ==
In a city park in Syracuse, Italy, artist Michele Spanghero built the Echea Aeolica in 2015. This fiberglass and steel sound sculpture is inspired by the ancient echea "to create a connection to the ancient history of the land as if it leads an echo from afar." The permanent installation is interactive, encouraging viewers to use it as a listening device. Due to its location and the context of its outdoor placement, it can also be associated with acoustic mirrors and Aeolian harps.

== See also ==
- Archaeoacoustics
- Helmholtz resonance
- Room acoustics
