= Zakomara =

Architectural element in Eastern Europe

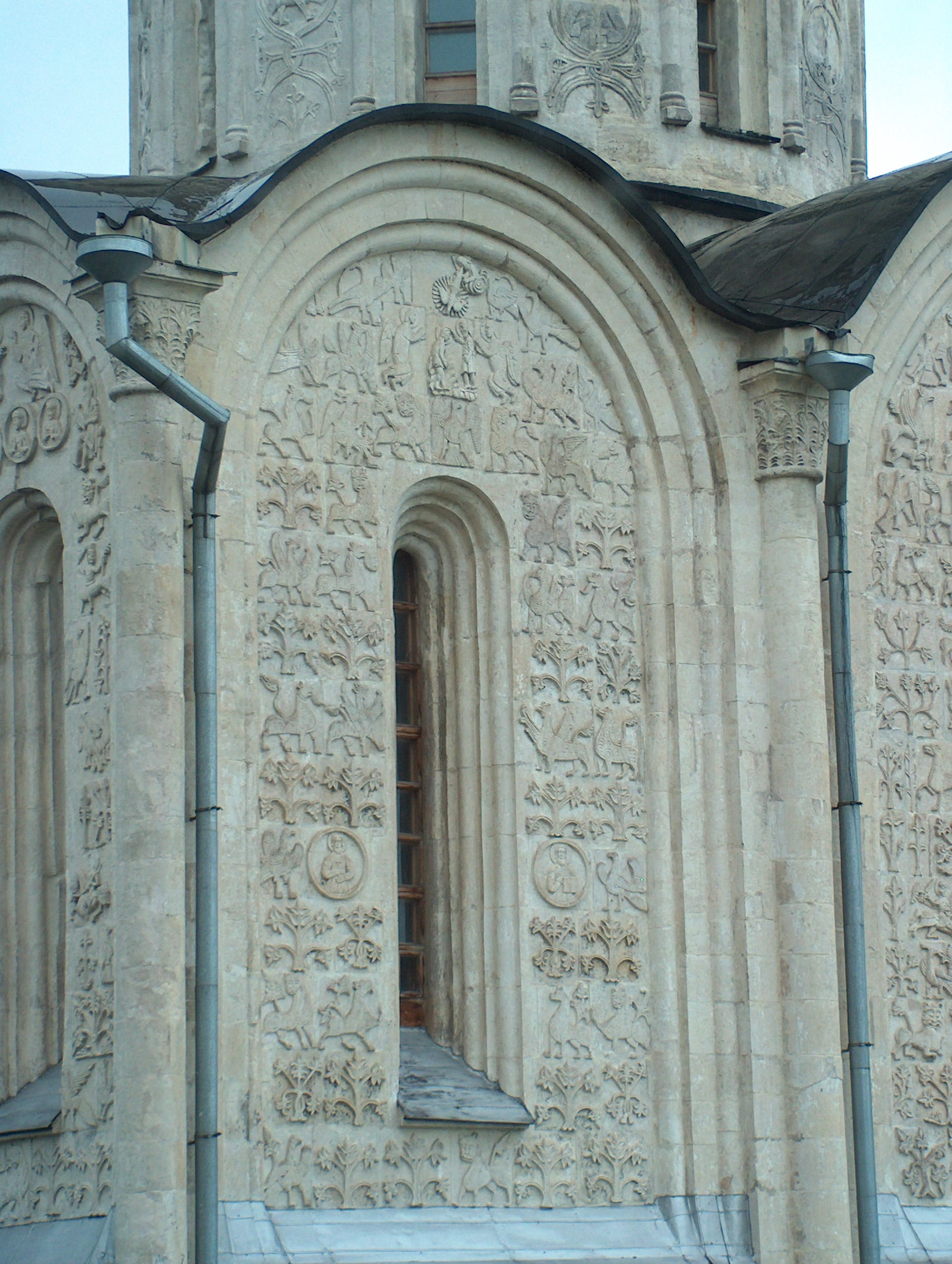
Cathedral of Saint Demetrius, Vladimir, Russia

Zakomara (Russian and Ukrainian: Закомара; Belarusian: Закамара) is a semicircular or keeled completion of a wall (curtain wall) in early Russian church architecture.

It first appeared in Kievan Rus', reproducing the adjacent to the inner cylindrical (convex, crossed) vault. Early examples can also be found in Belarus and Ukraine. After the 12th century, the zakomara, initially influenced by Byzantine architecture, was adapted into a more uniquely Russian style and it became a distinctive feature of Russian churches before the emergence of Russian Baroque.

False zakomara, which is not repeating the inner shapes of the vault, is called the kokoshnik. Kokoshniks were only made as exterior decorative elements. They were placed on the walls, vaults, as well as the shrinking tiers at the base of the tents and reels of chapters in church buildings.

== History ==
Similar features have existed in the Byzantine Empire and early examples of zakomaras are considered to have been borrowed under Byzantine influence. However, some researchers consider zakomaras to be a unique development of architecture in Kievan Rus' and one of the first deviations from the traditional Byzantine style in the region, with the Boris and Gleb Cathedral, now in Chernihiv, Ukraine, being among the first such examples.

The transition to a more uniquely Russian aesthetic began in the 12th century as seen in the Church of the Intercession on the Nerl. From the 12th to the 17th centuries, zakomaras were a typical detail in Russian Orthodox church architecture. Quite often, a combination of zakomaras and kokoshniks was used in the construction of many churches. The Cathedral of the Savior in the Andronikov Monastery (1425–1427), part of the Moscow school, follows the Russian adaptation of this style.

The roof in the zakomara covering was arranged directly on the vaults. Depending on the number of vaults, the facade of the church had the same amount of zakomaras. By the seventeenth century, a significant number of Russian churches had the zakomara covering. But sophisticated curvilinear rooftop was not very practical—the snow and rain accumulated on it, causing leaks. By the end of the seventeenth century, the Baroque era came to the Russian architecture, making the zakomaras and zakomara coverings a thing of the past. In the eighteenth and nineteenth centuries, zakomara coverings were replaced with four-pitched roofs in many churches. Because of the spread of the retrospective trends in the Russian Empire’s architecture, zakomaras reappeared in the church buildings.

At the end of the 20th century, the revival of the zakomara covering has occurred. It was due to the appearance of construction technology, which created rain and snow resistant zakomara coverings. Therefore, the new Uspensky Cathedral in Yaroslavl has the zakomara covering.

== Examples ==
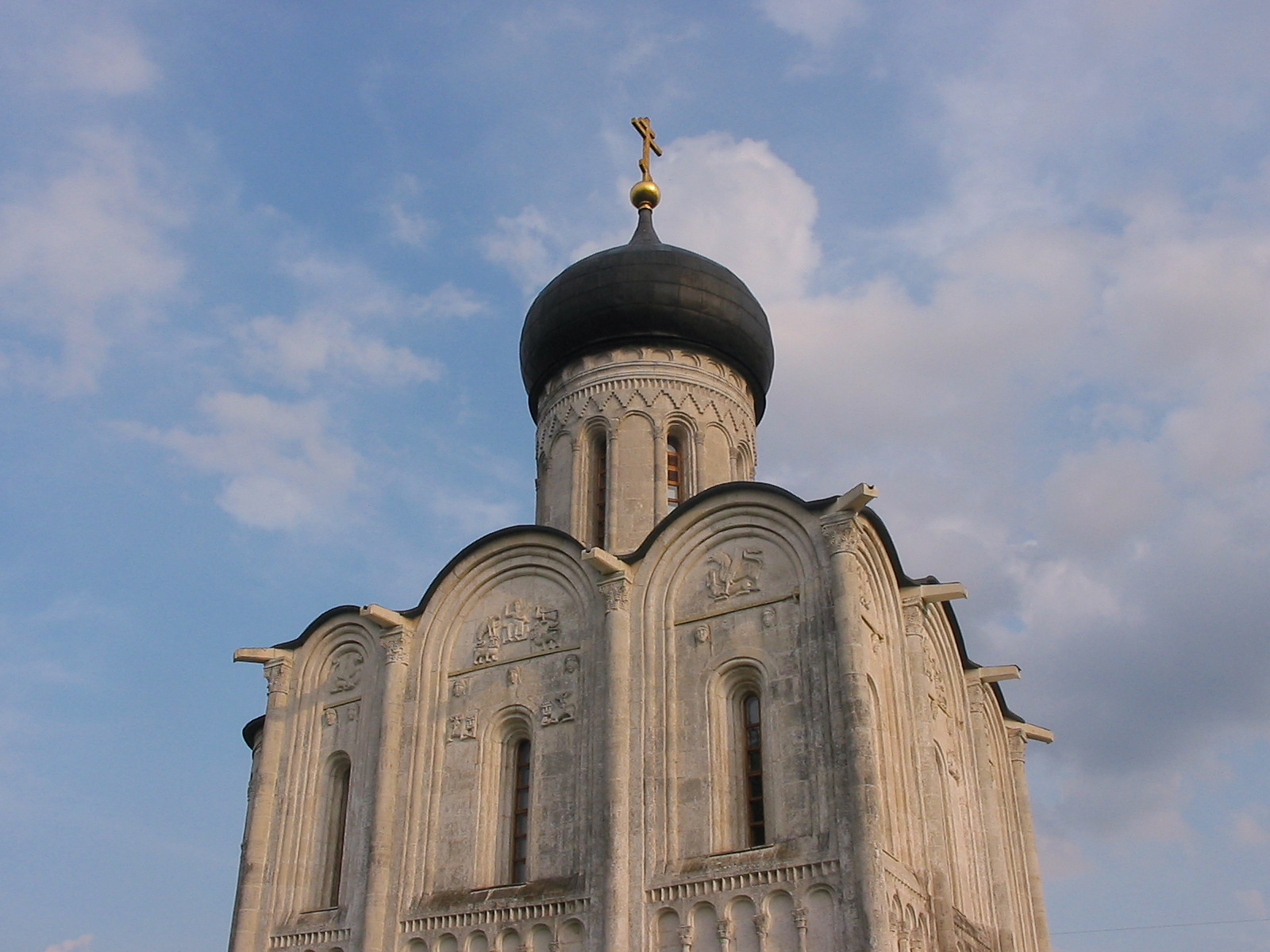
Zakomaras of the Church of the Intercession on the Nerl

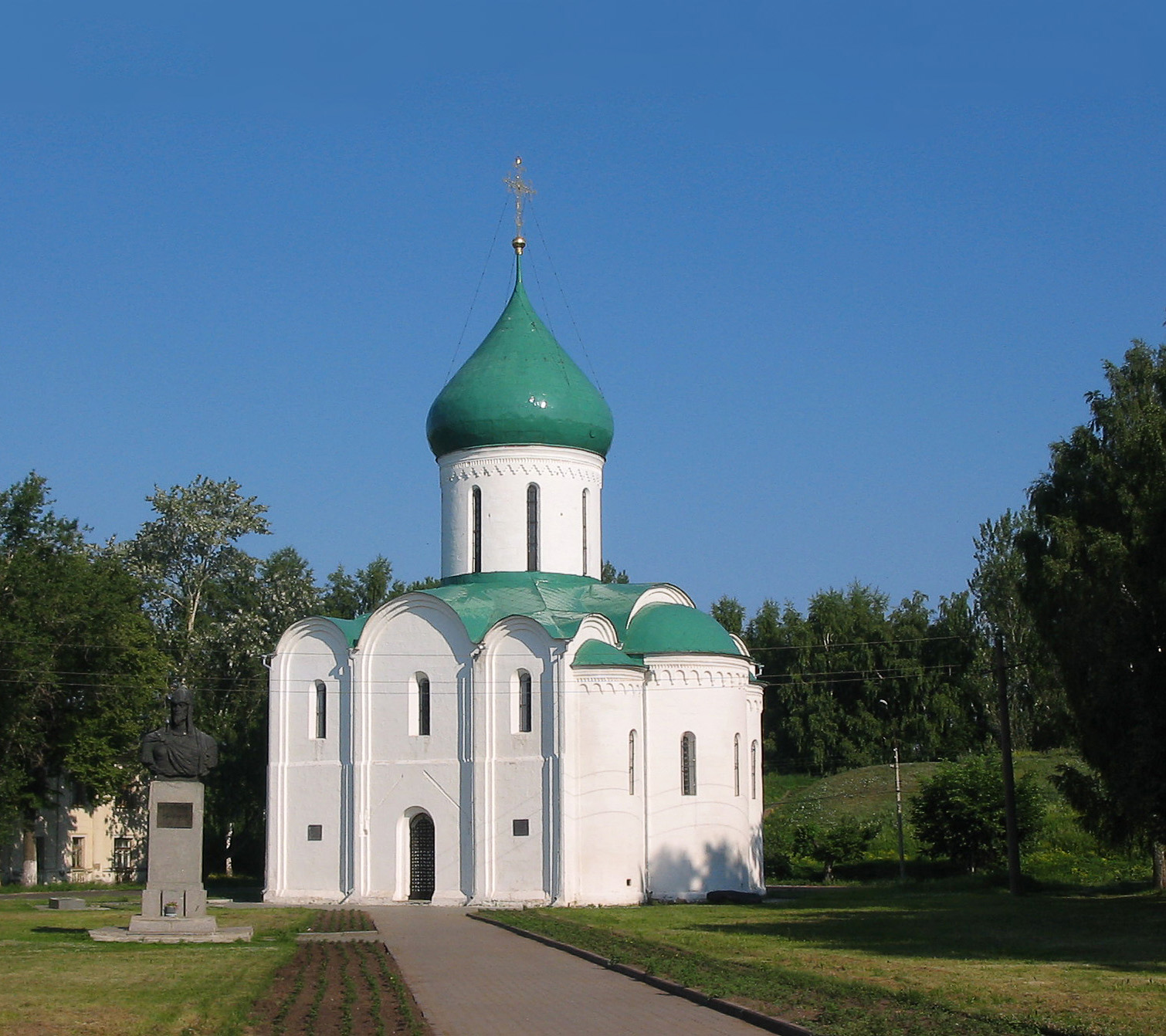
Facades of Transfiguration Cathedral in Pereslavl-Zalessky, with zakomaras

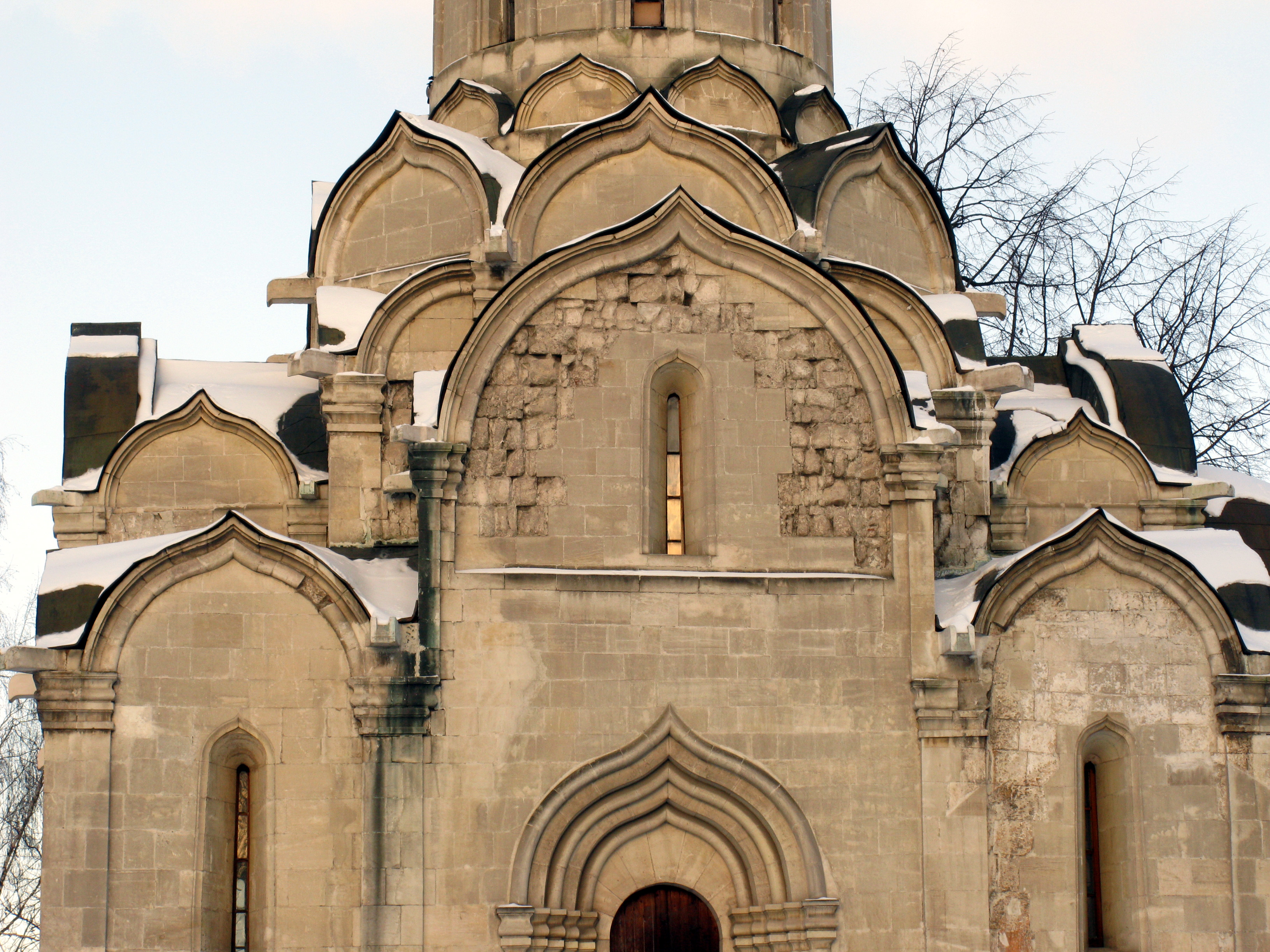
Saviour Cathedral of the Andronikov Monastery, combination of zakomaras and kokoshniks typical for Moscow style

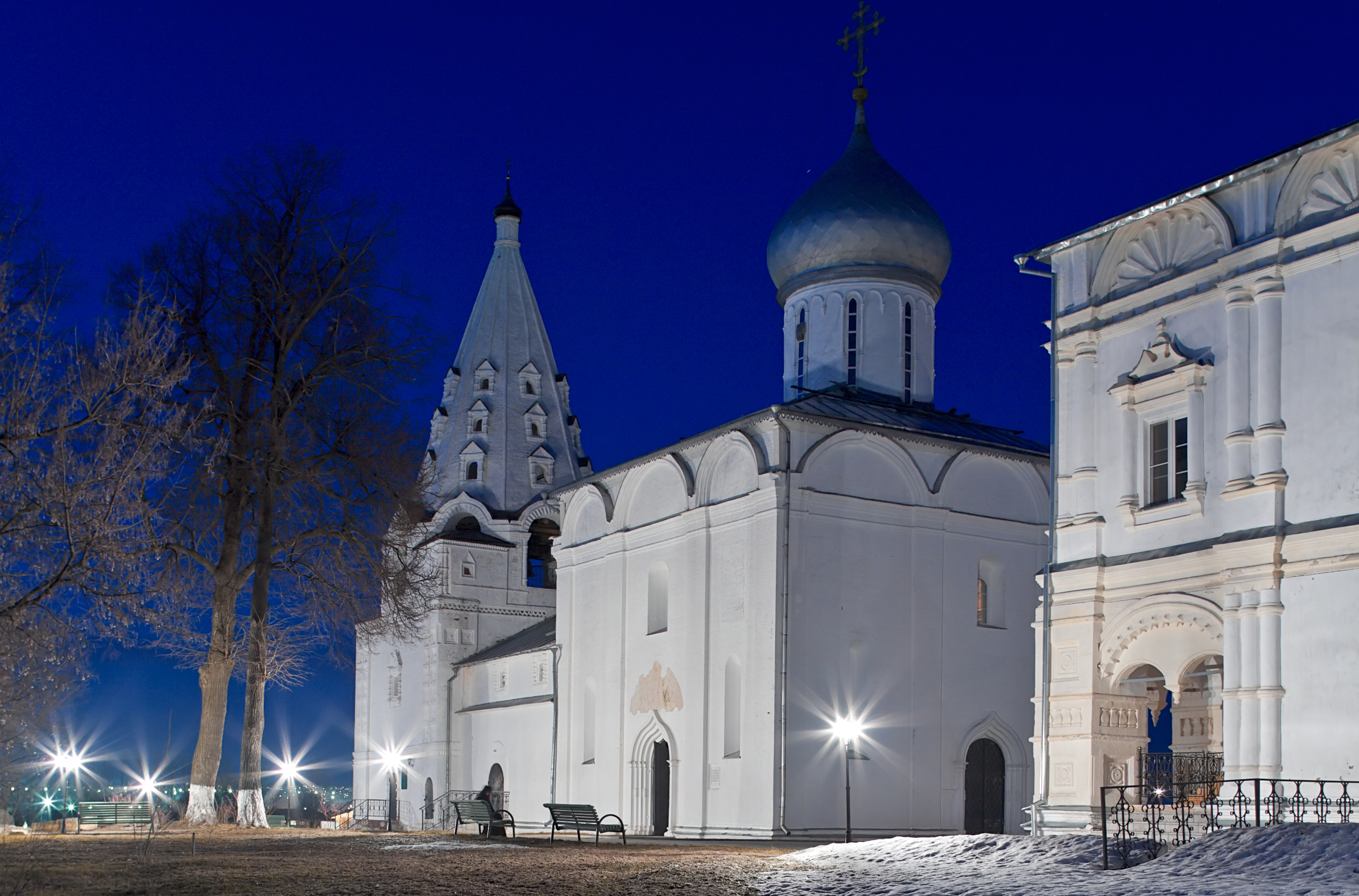
Trinity Cathedral of the Trinity Danilov Monastery in Pereslavl-Zalessky with a roof rebuilt as hipped one

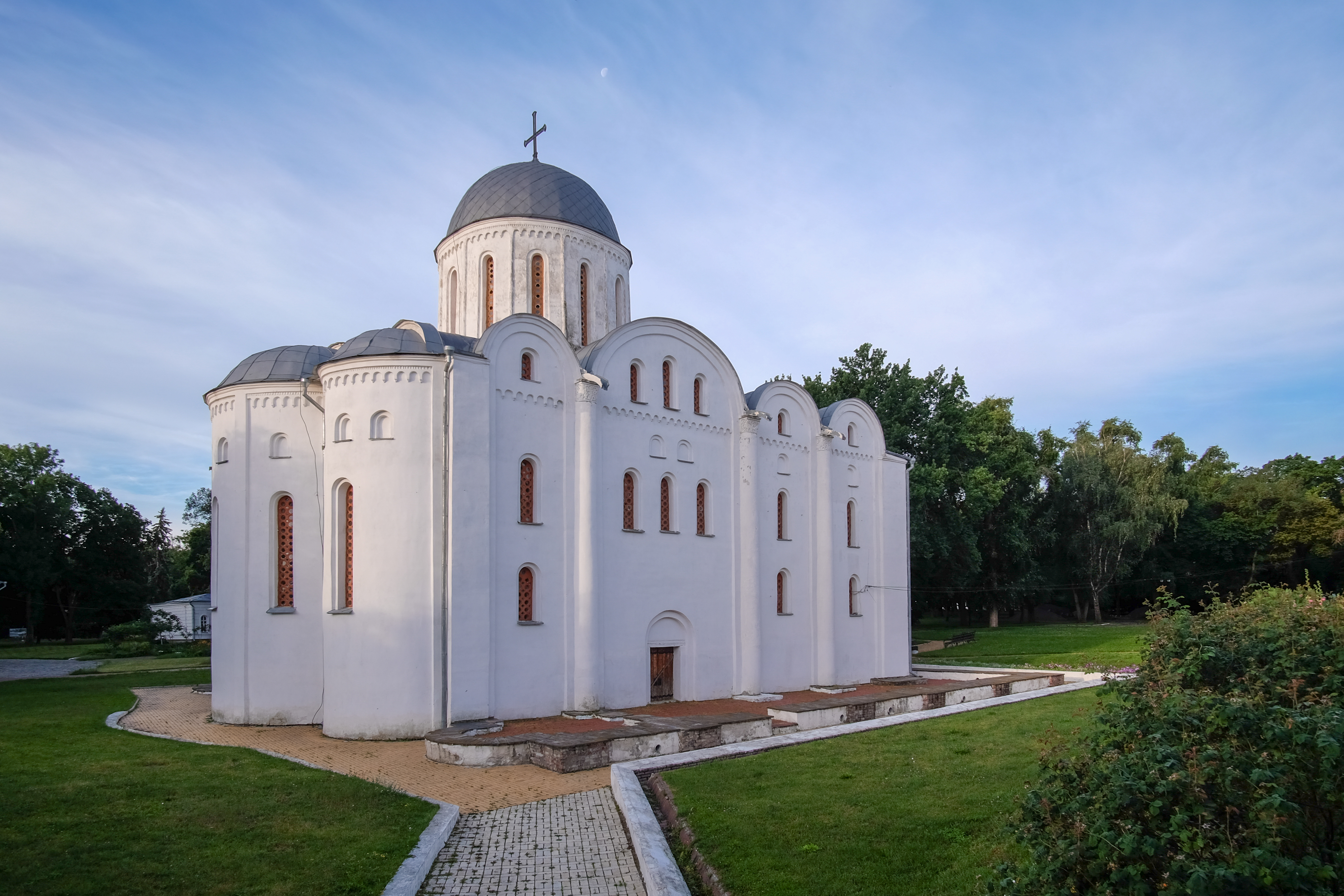
Boris and Gleb Cathedral in Chernihiv with zakomaras

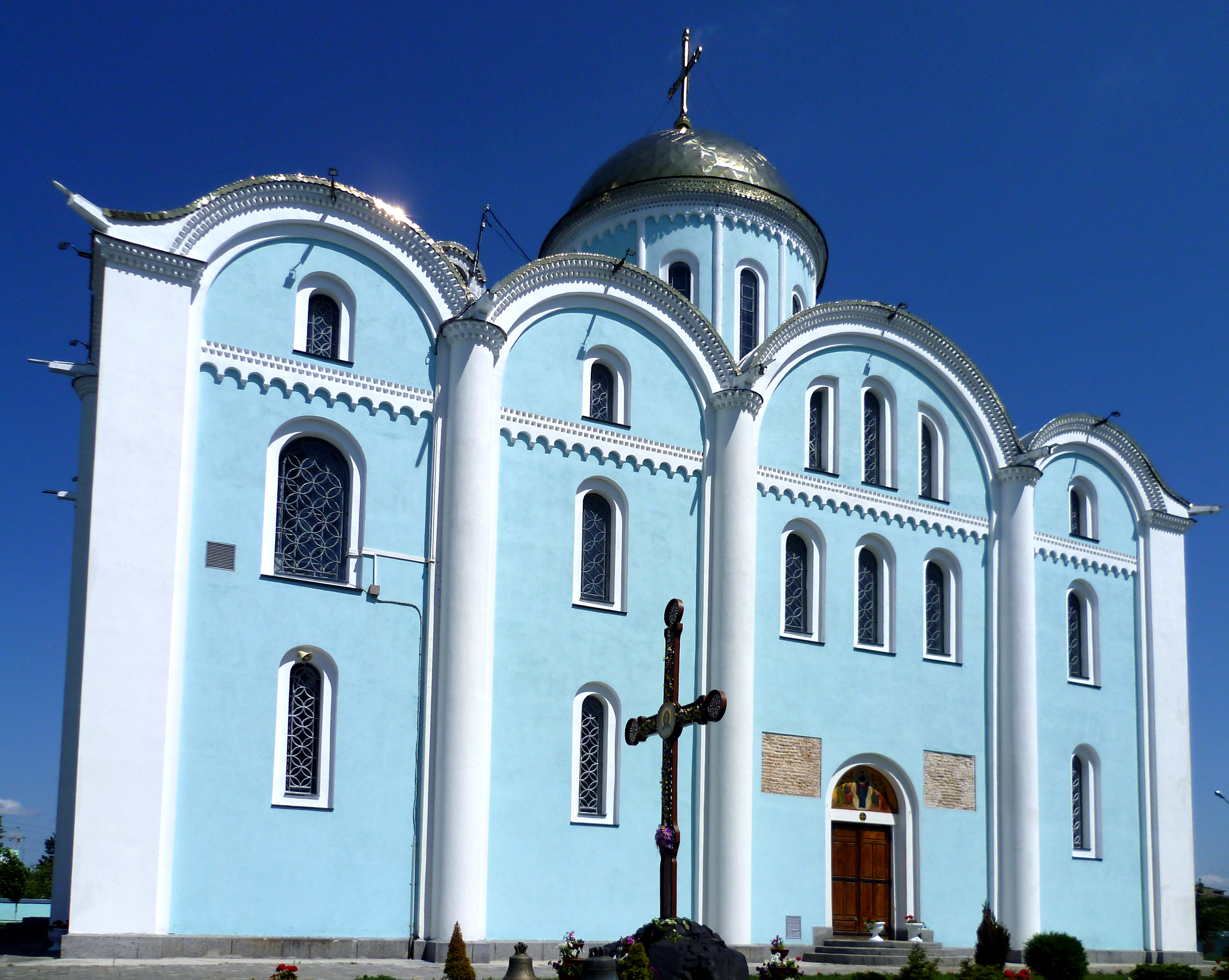
Dormition Cathedral in Volodymyr with zakomaras

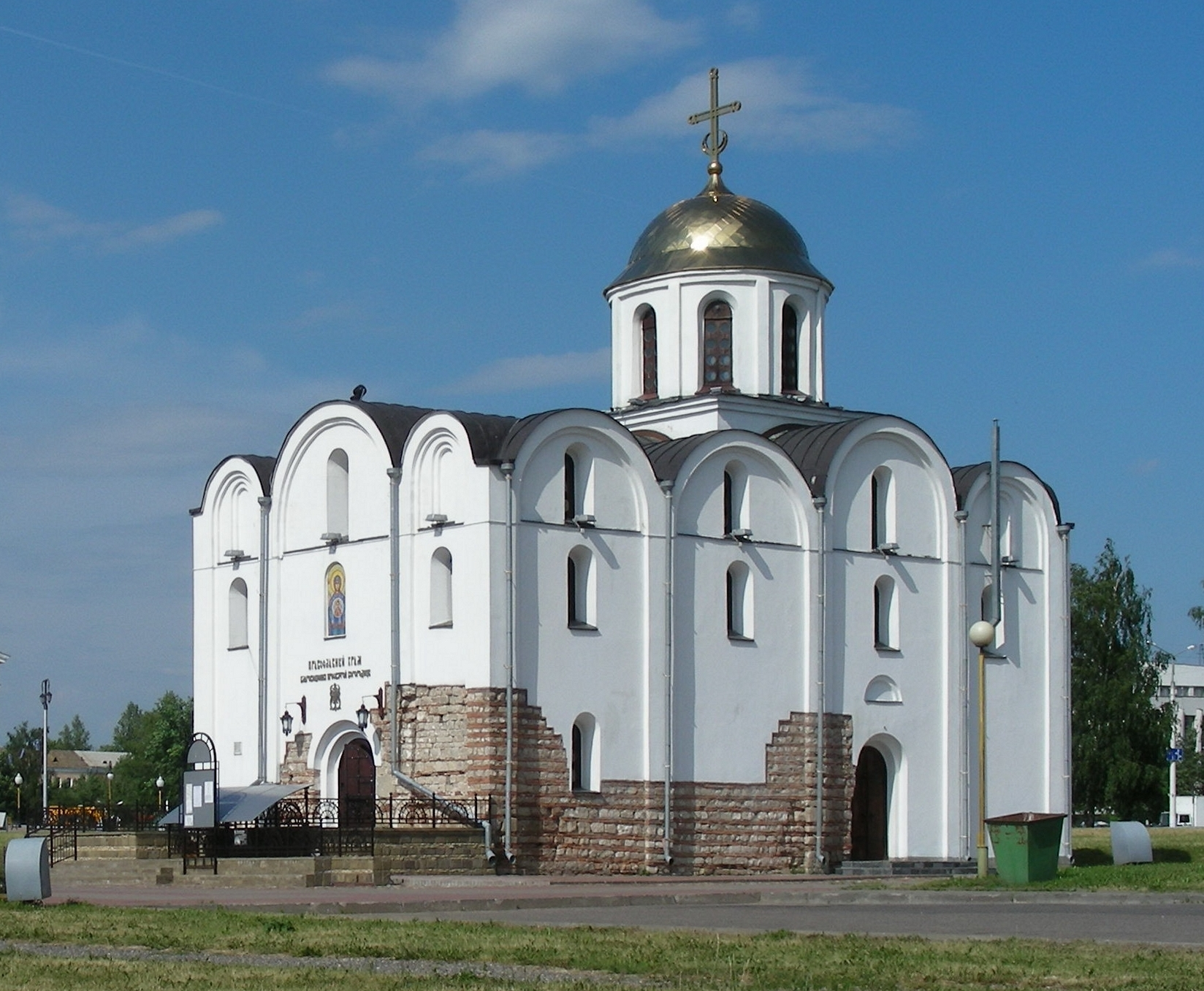
Anunciation Cathedral in Vitebsk with zakomaras
