= Kokoshnik architecture =

Decorative element in Old Russian architecture

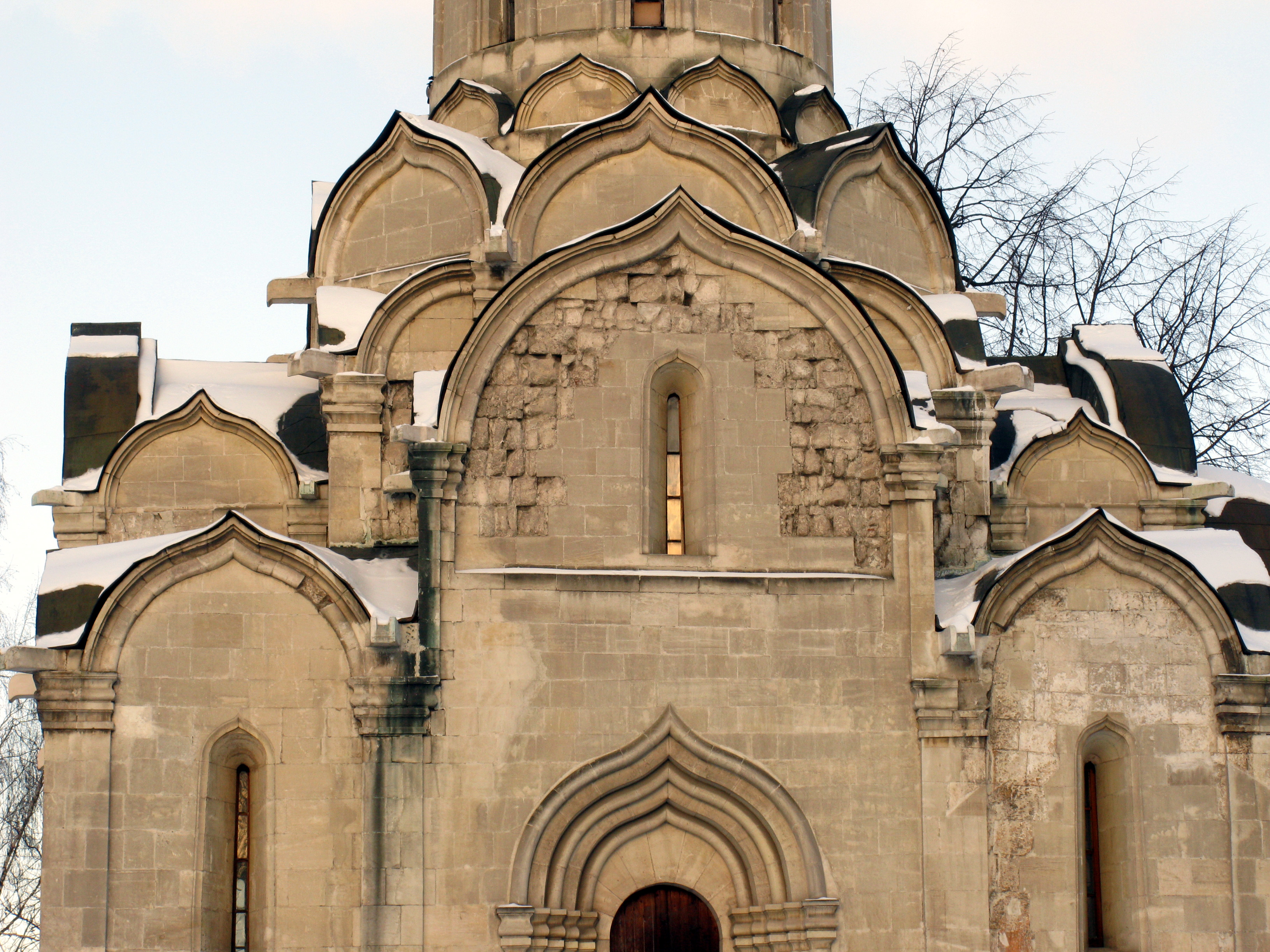
Spassky cathedral of the Andronikov Monastery shows the combination of kokoshniks above and zakomaras below.

Kokoshnik is a semicircular or keel-like exterior decorative element in the Old Russian architecture, a type of corbel zakomara (that is an arch-like semicircular top of the church wall). Unlike zakomara that continues the curvature of the vault behind and carries a part of the vault's weight, kokoshnik is pure decoration and does not carry any weight. Kokoshnik shares its name with the traditional Russian headdress worn by women and girls. The word itself derives from the Old Slavic word kokosh, which refers to a hen or a cockerel.

Kokoshniks were used in the Russian church architecture from the 16th century, and they were especially popular in the 17th century. They were placed on walls, at the basement of tented roofs or tholobates, over the window frames, or in rows above the vaults.

== Examples ==
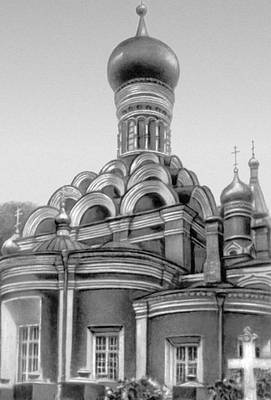
The Smaller Cathedral of Donskoy Monastery with the three rows of large kokoshniks

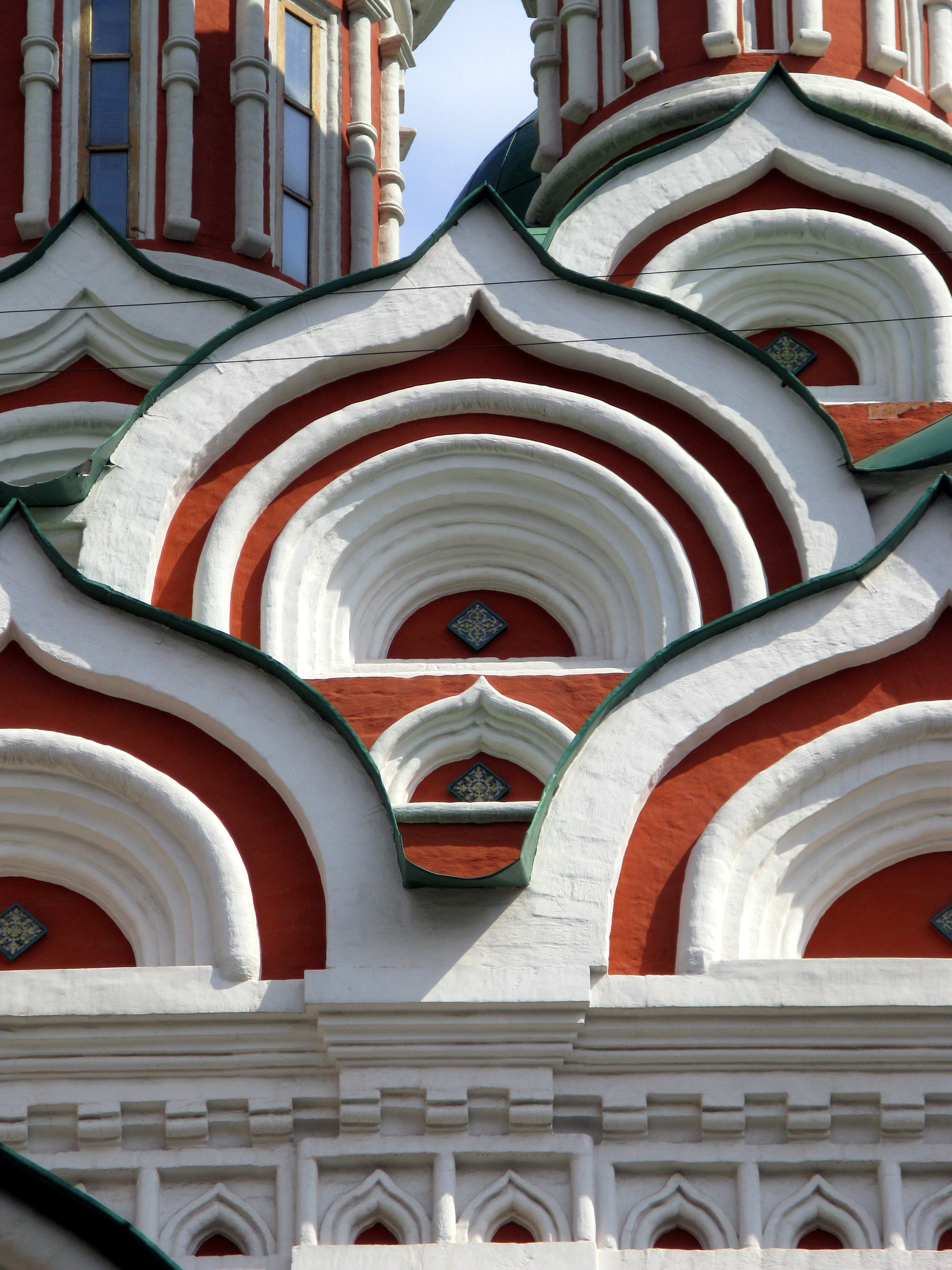
The kokoshniks of the Holy Trinity Church in Nikitinki, Moscow

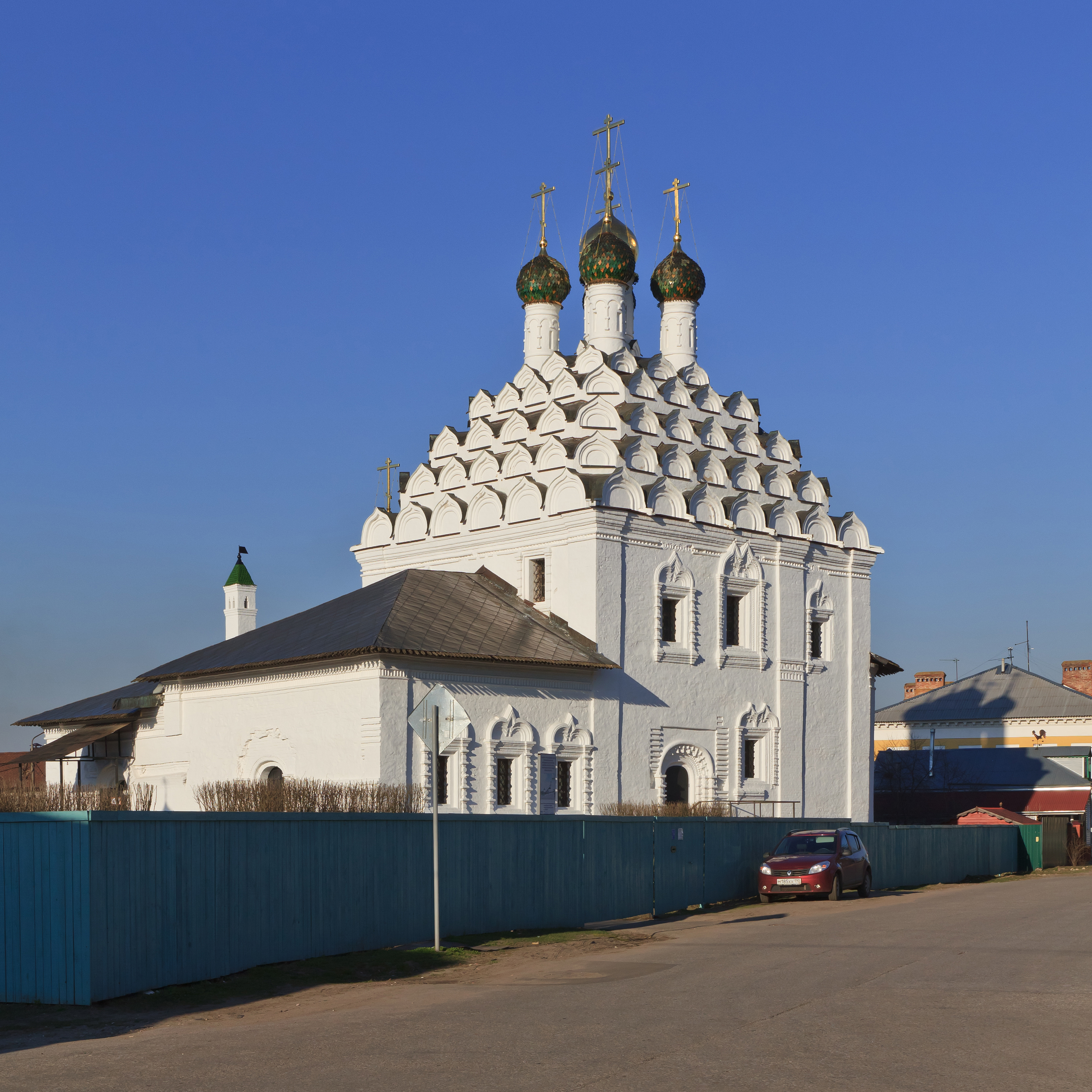
The Church of St. Nicholas in Kolomna. Five rows of kokoshniks completely cover the vaults outside.

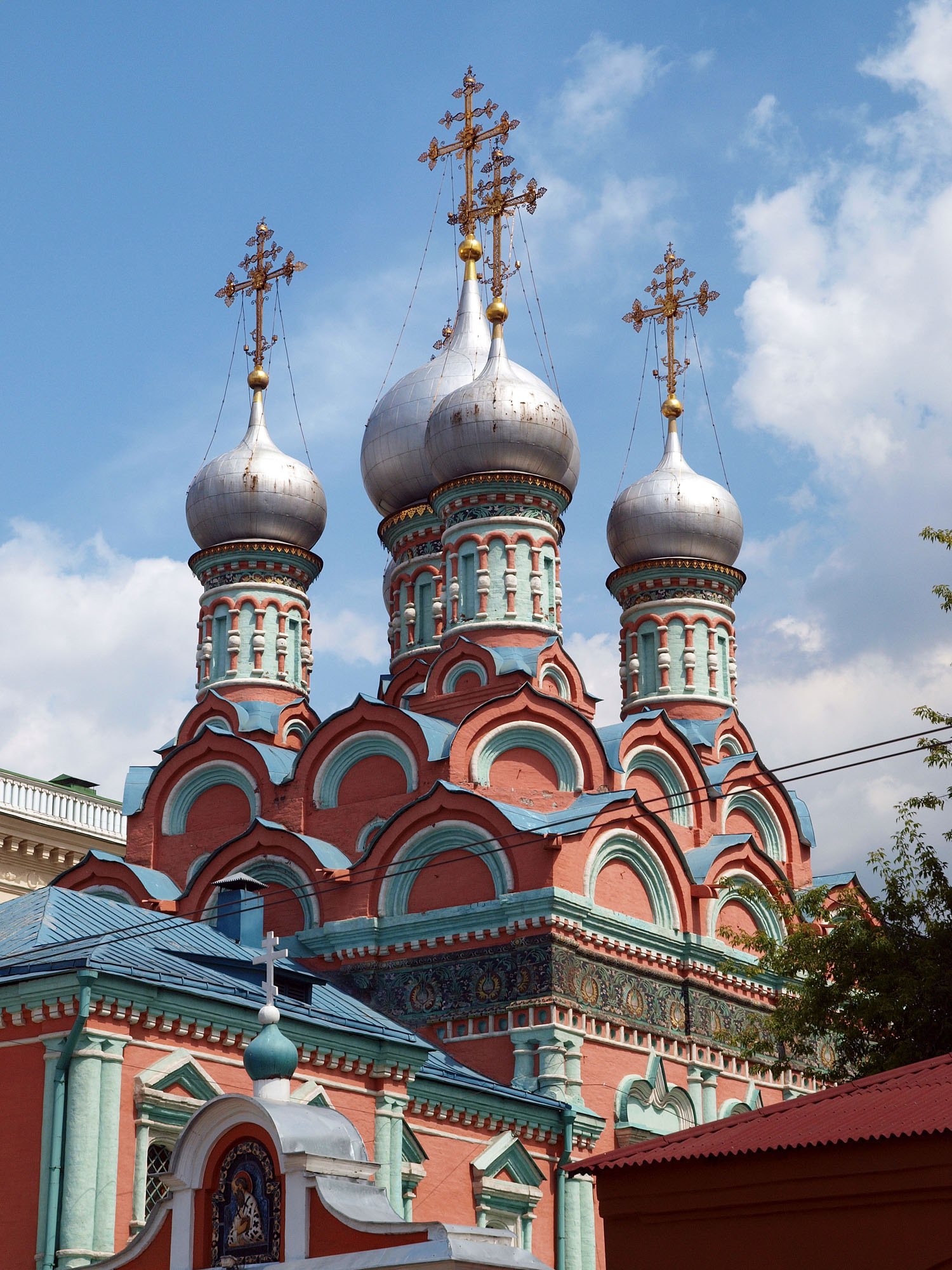
Kokoschniks on the Church of Saint Gregory of Neocaesarea in Polyanka
