= St Andrew's Church, Lyddington =

Church in Lyddington, Rutland

Coordinates: 52°33′50″N 0°42′32″W

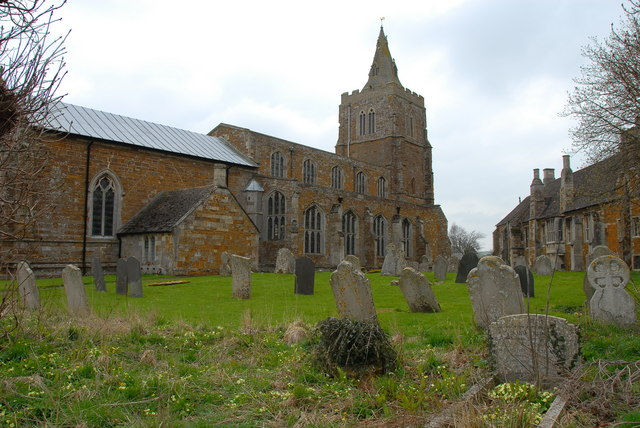
- St Andrew's Church, Lyddington
- Denomination: Church of England

History
- Dedication: St Andrew

Administration
- Diocese: Diocese of Peterborough
- Deanery: Rutland

Clergy
- Vicar: Jane Baxter

St Andrew's Church is a church in Lyddington, Rutland. It is a Grade I listed building.

== History ==
The church is situated next to Lyddington Bede House, the remains of a palace formerly owned by the bishops of Lincoln.

The current church primarily dates to the 14th and 15th centuries. In the western porch there are two carved grave slabs, there is also 15th-century wall paintings, over the chancel arch, nave and pulpit, and a rood screen.

In the walls of the chancel, there are eleven acoustic jars set high into the wall. They were added in the hope to improve the acoustics. Also in the chancel is a communion table surrounded by communion rails. These were added by Puritans in c1635 when they wanted altars to be moved into the church's body, though Archbishop Laud wanted it to be moved to the eastern wall. Though a compromise was agreed, making today's arrangement.

15th-century brasses can be found near the steps of the altar.

== Gallery ==
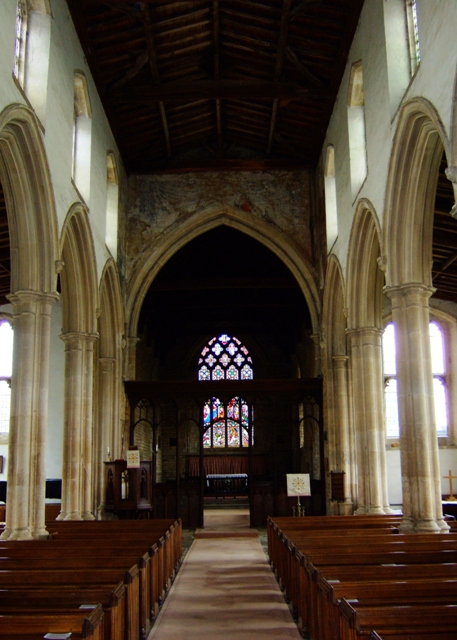
Church interior

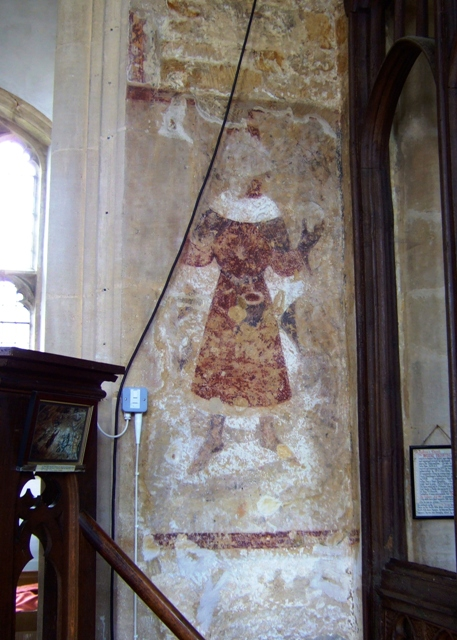
Wall painting
