= Lyddington Bede House =

Historic house in Rutland, England

Coordinates: 52.5639°N 0.7093°W

Lyddington Bishop's Palace and later Lyddington Bedehouse
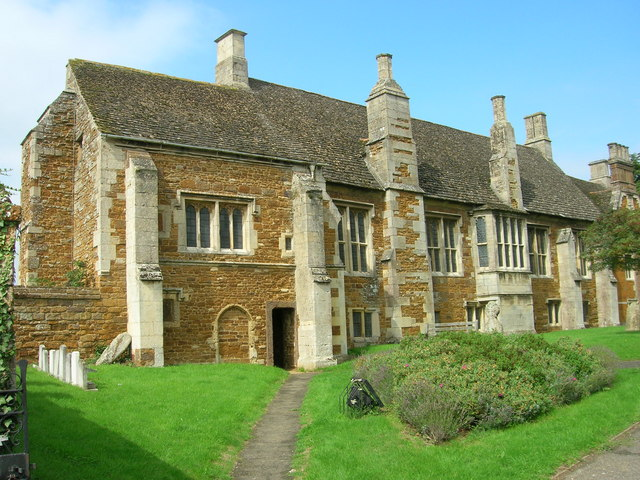
- Lyddington Bede House

- Location in Rutland
- Location: The Bedehouse is adjacent to the parish church.
- OS grid reference: SP8758797005

History
- Founded: 12th Century
- Demolished: Wing of a building, the remainder demolished after 1547

Site notes
- Architectural style: Medieval with later alterations
- Governing body: English Heritage

Listed Building – Grade I
- Official name: The Bede House
- Designated: 10 November 1955
- Reference no.: 1264528

Scheduled monument
- Official name: Lyddington Bedehouse: a medieval bishop's palace and post-medieval almshouse with moat, gardens, fishponds and cultivation remains
- Designated: 11-Sep-1947
- Reference no.: 1013825

Listed Building – Grade I
- Official name: Lyddington Watchtower
- Designated: 10-Nov-1955
- Reference no.: 1236617

Lyddington Bede House (or Lyddington Bedehouse) is a historic house in Rutland, England, owned and opened to the public by English Heritage. The existing Grade I listed building is a part of a former palace of the Bishops of Lincoln, later used as an almshouse. It is next to St Andrew's Church in the village of Lyddington. The watch tower or gazebo is separately listed as Grade I and the boundary walls are Grade II. The site is a scheduled monument.

== History ==
The medieval Diocese of Lincoln was the largest bishopric in England, extending from the River Thames to the Humber Estuary. Lyddington lay on a north–south road and the estate here was a convenient place for the bishop's entourage to stop when traversing the diocese.

After the Reformation, ownership passed to the Cecil family who made it their private house. By 1600 it had passed to Thomas Cecil, 1st Earl of Exeter, son of Lord Burghley, who converted it into an almshouse for twelve poor bedesmen and it continued in this use until 1930. A feature is the former bishop's Great Chamber with its carved ceiling cornice.

The Bede House is a Grade I listed building, and the wider site is a Scheduled monument.

=== Watchtower ===
The Watchtower, or "Bishop's Eye", is a two-storey tower set into the garden wall of the palace. Its purpose is uncertain; although its name suggests a defensive intention, it is considered more likely to have been constructed for leisure. Elizabeth Williamson, in her Lincolnshire and Rutland volume in the Pevsner Buildings of England series, revised and reissued in 2003, describes it as a "summerhouse", and the Historic England listing record refers to it as a gazebo. The tower has its own Grade I listing, while the walls into which it is set are listed at Grade II. The remains of the fishponds of the bishop's palace are nearby.

== Lyddington Bishop's Palace and Bedehouse gallery ==
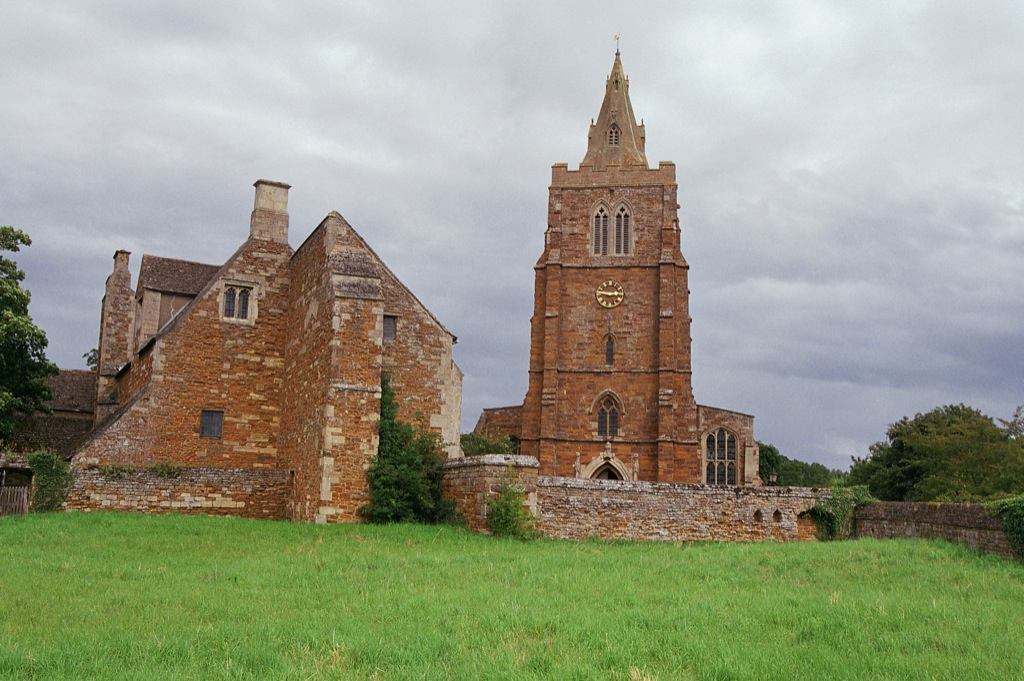
The Bede House and St Andrew's Church from the orchard

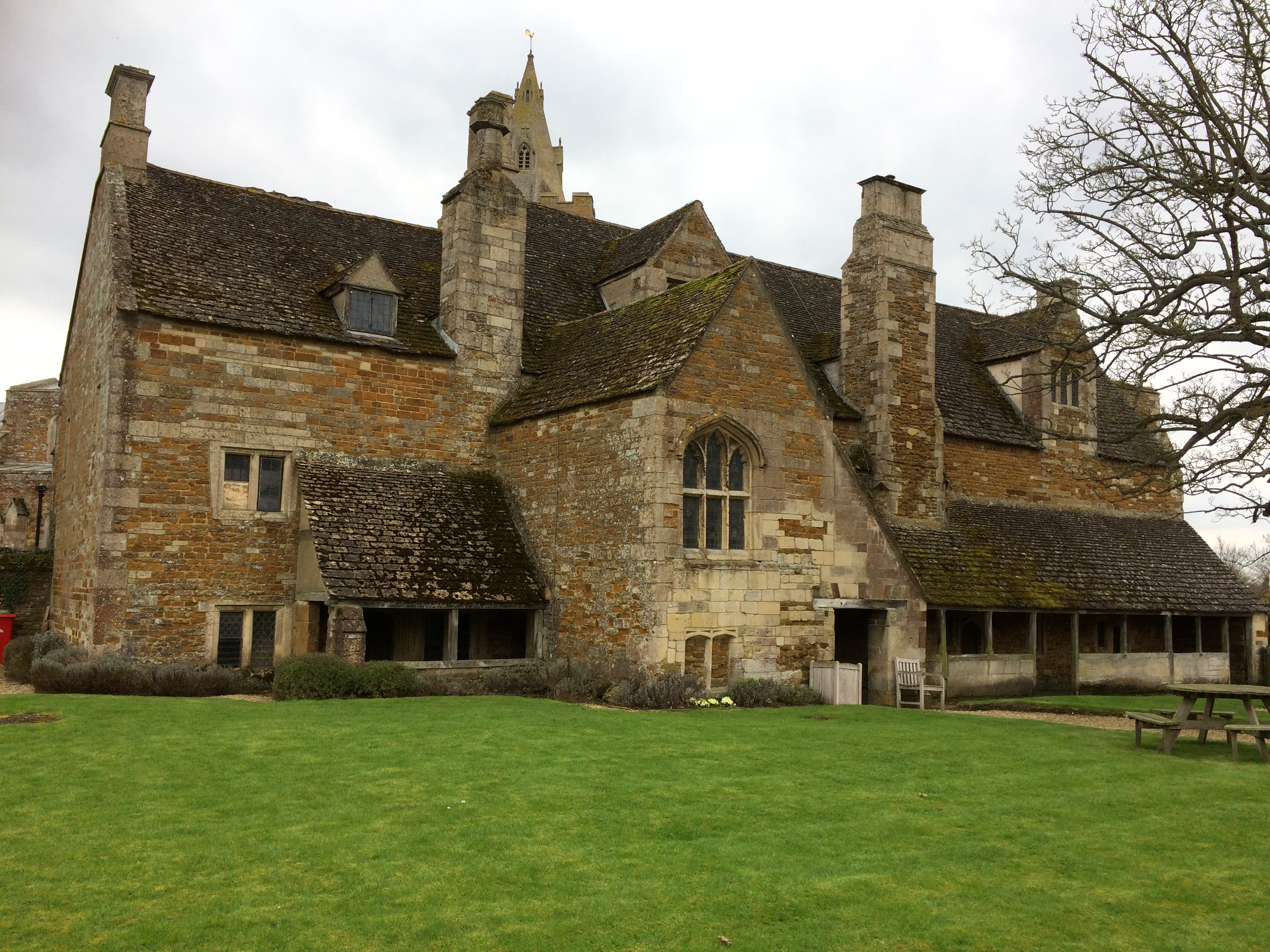
North aspect

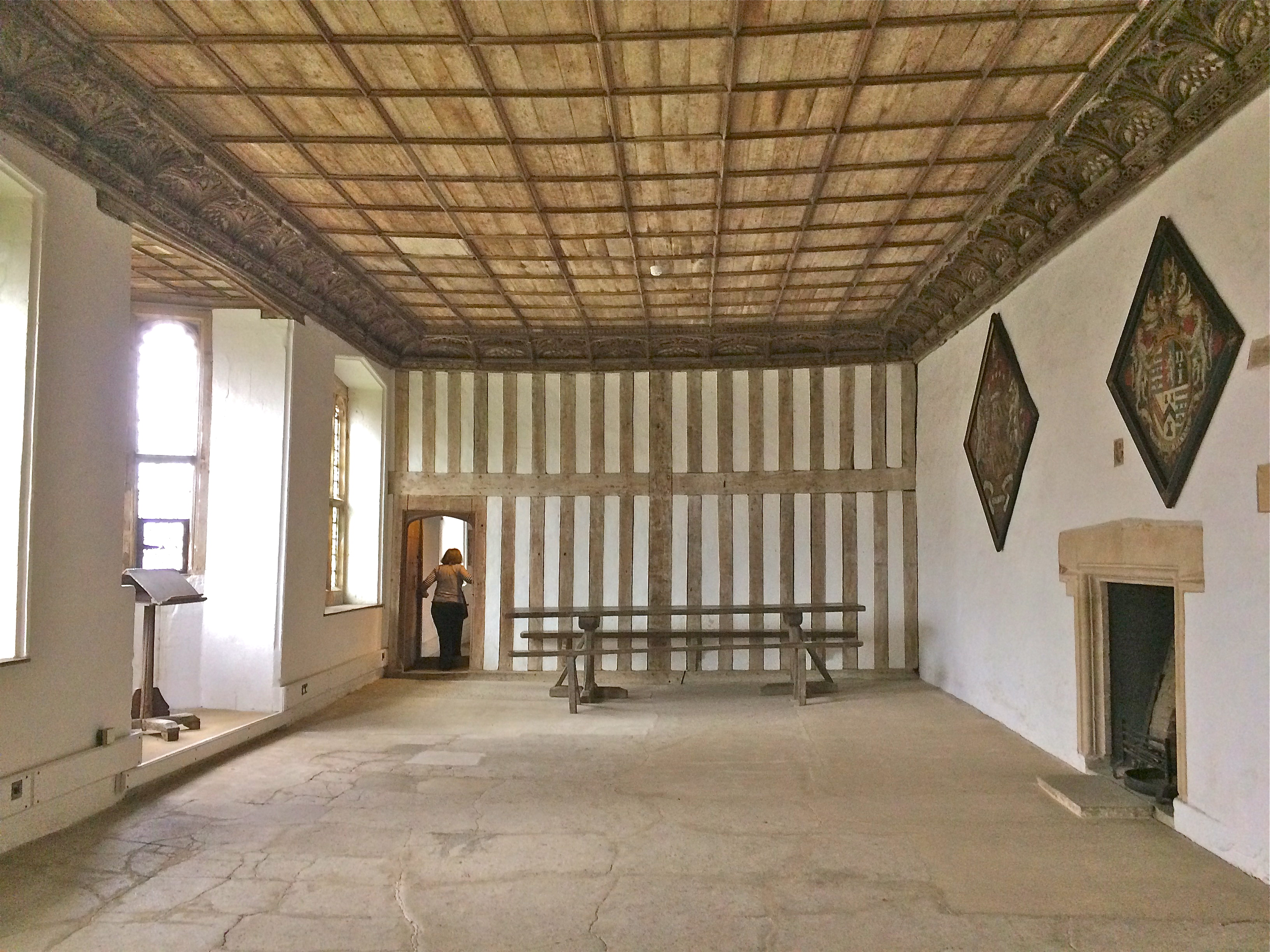
Bede House, hall

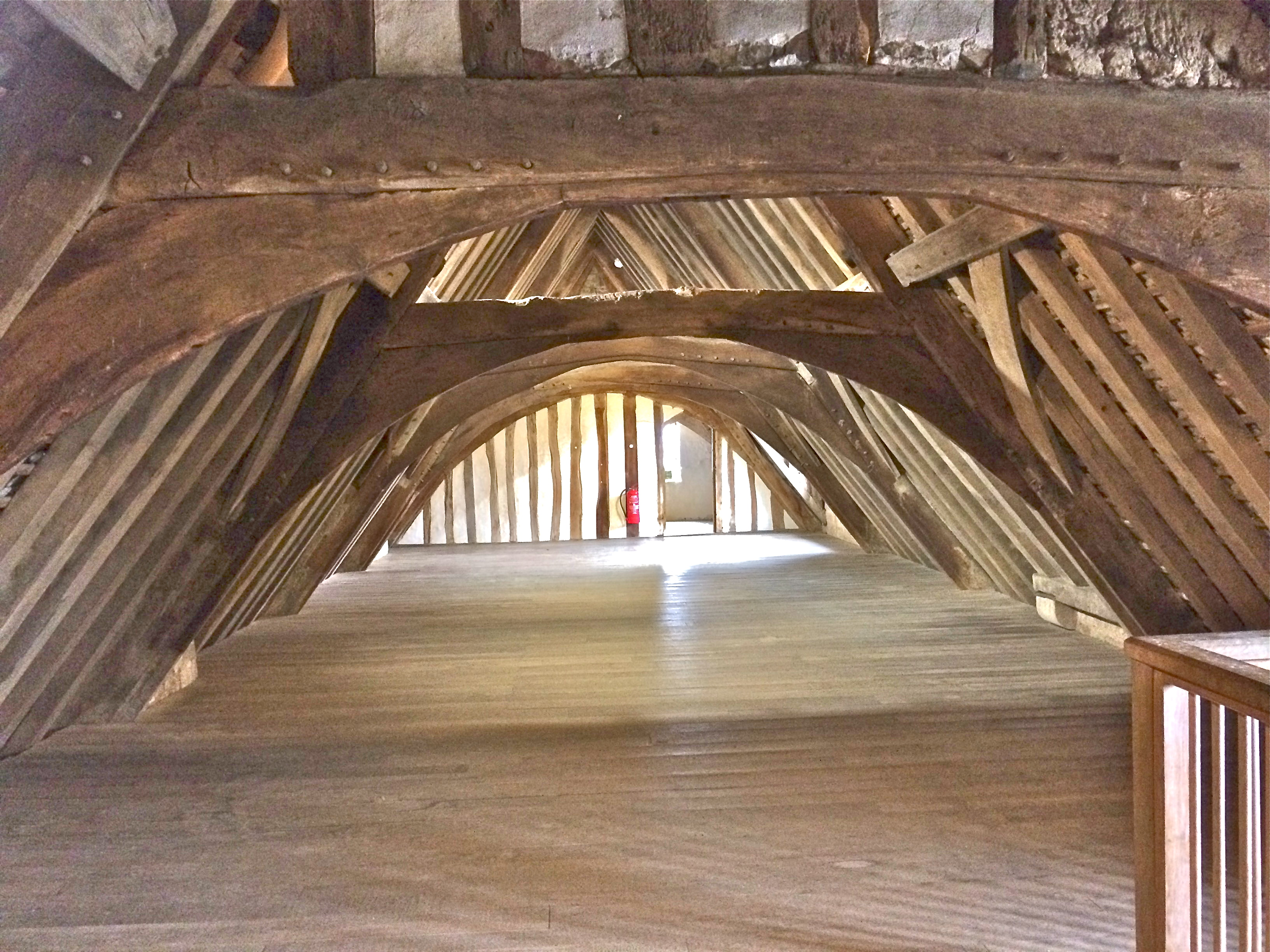
Attic roof structure

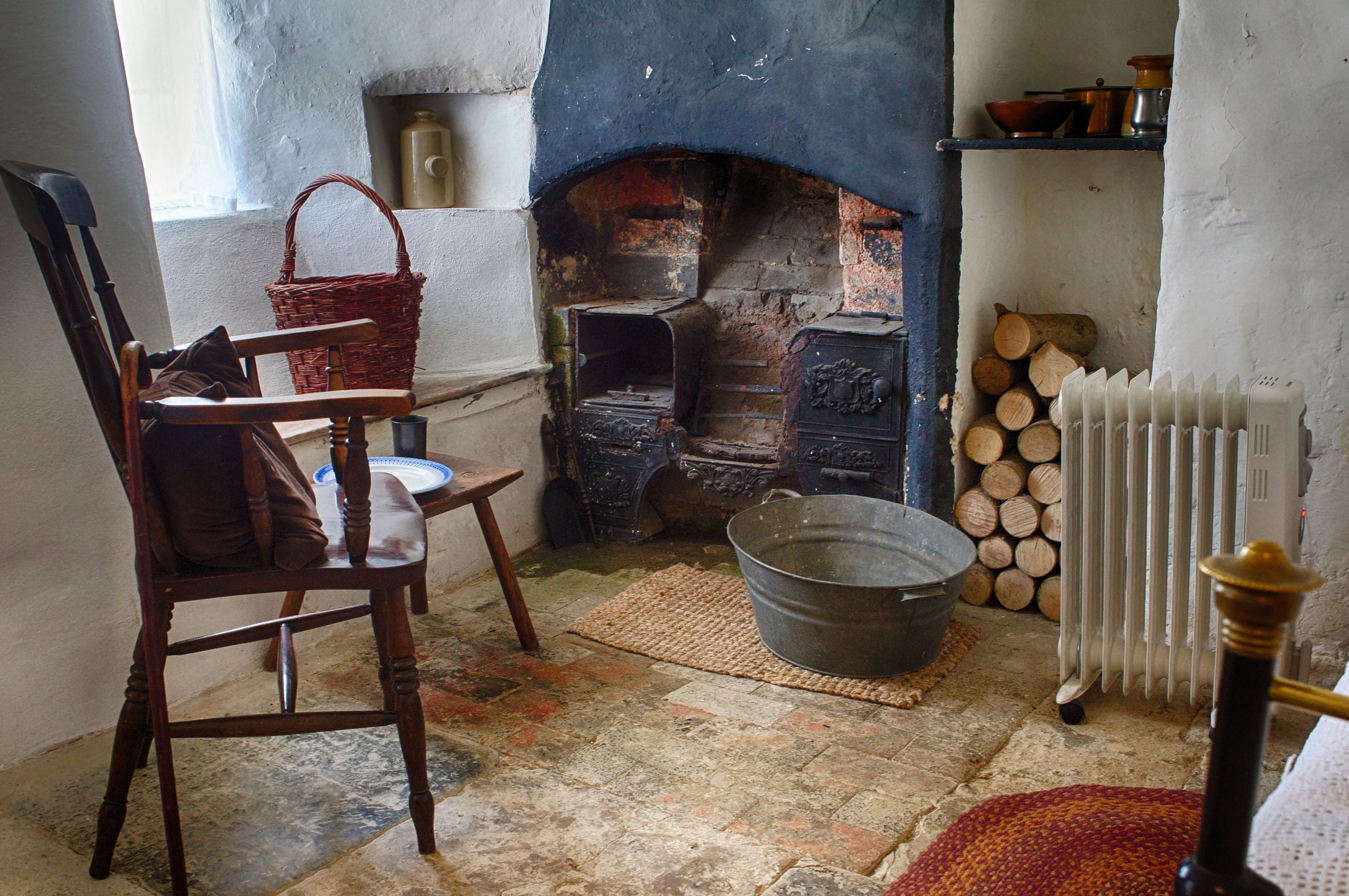
Bedesman's room

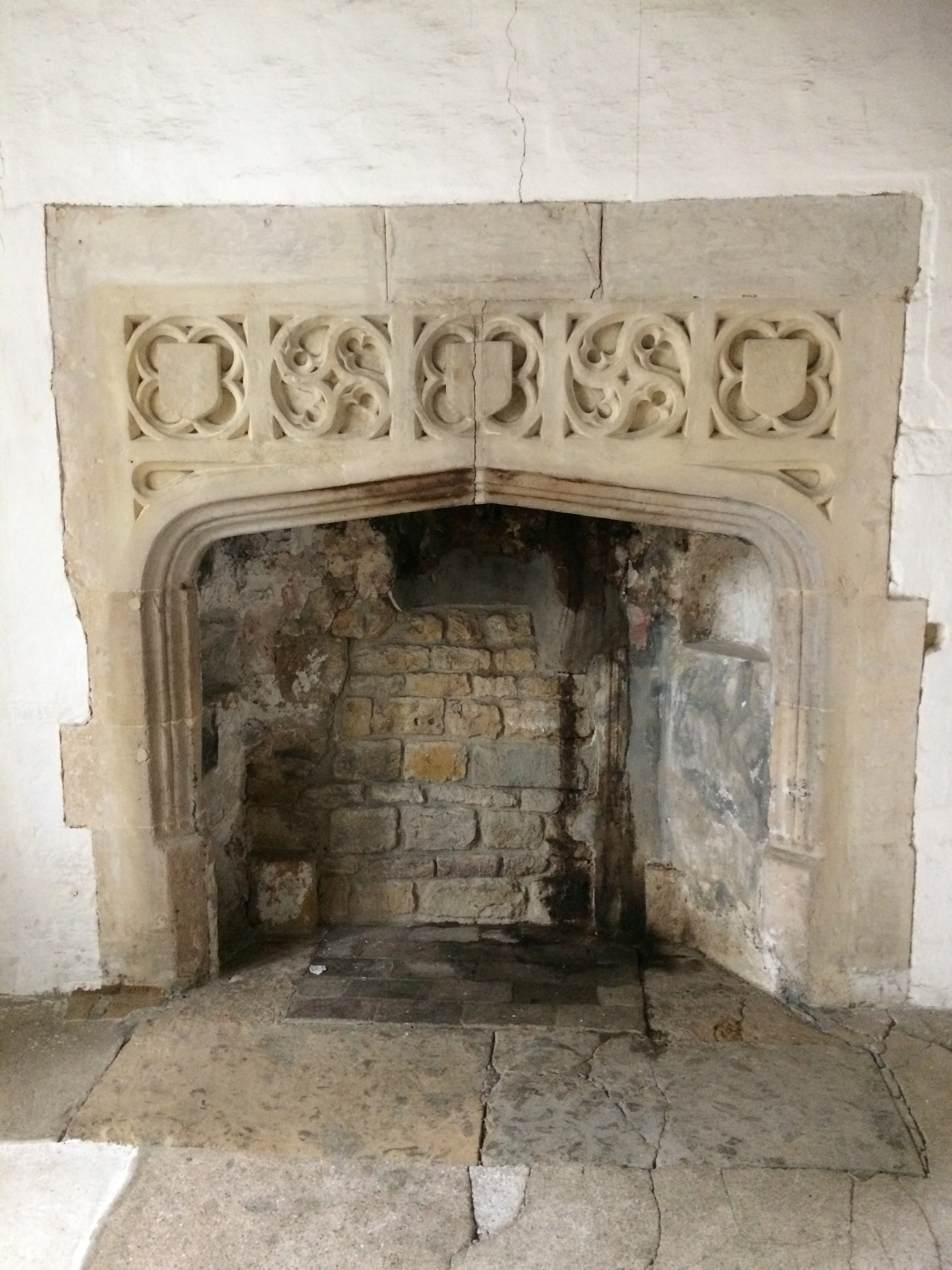
Decorated medieval fireplace

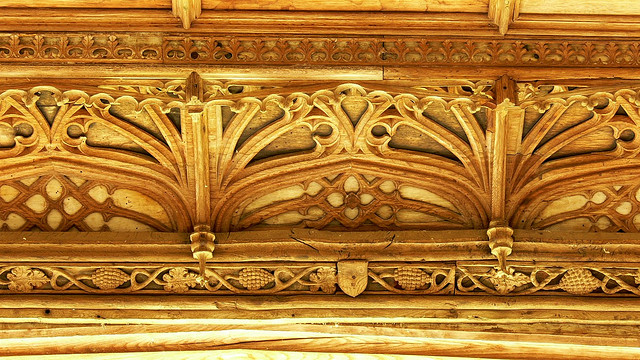
Early 16th-century cornice

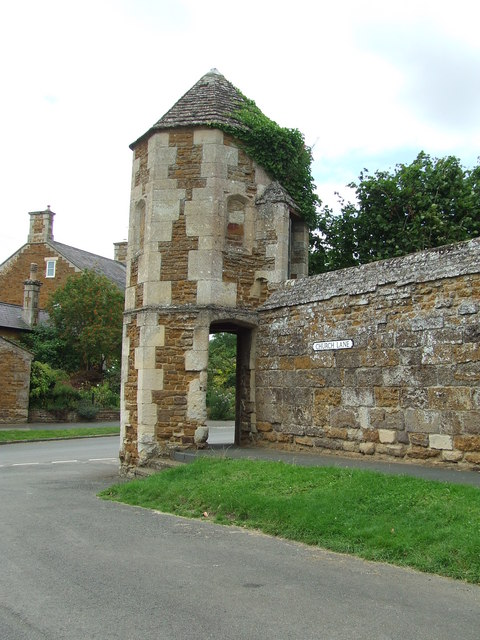
The "Bishop's Eye" watch tower on the corner of Main Street and Church Lane

== Nearby English Heritage attractions ==
- Rushton Triangular Lodge
- Kirby Hall
- Eleanor Cross, Geddington

== See also: other palaces and residences of the Bishop of Lincoln ==
- Biggleswade
- Buckden Palace, Huntingdonshire
- Dorchester on Thames, Oxfordshire
- Fingest, Buckinghamshire.
- Horncastle, Lincolnshire. Bishop's Palace
- Lincoln Medieval Bishop's Palace
- London, Camden, Inn of the Bishop of Lincoln, later Southampton House. Purchased from Templars by Bishop Robert de Chesney (1148–68)
- Louth, Lincolnshire
- Nettleham, Lincolnshire
- Spaldwick, Huntingdonshire, Bury Close
- Stow, Lincolnshire
- Thame, Oxfordshire
- Wooburn, Buckinghamshire. Bishop's Palace

== Sources ==
- Pevsner, Nikolaus; Williamson, Elizabeth (2003). Leicestershire and Rutland. The Buildings of England. New Haven, US and London: Yale University Press. ISBN 978-0-300-09618-7. OCLC 49298894.
