= Lyddington =

Village in Rutland, England

Coordinates: 52.563°N 0.709°W

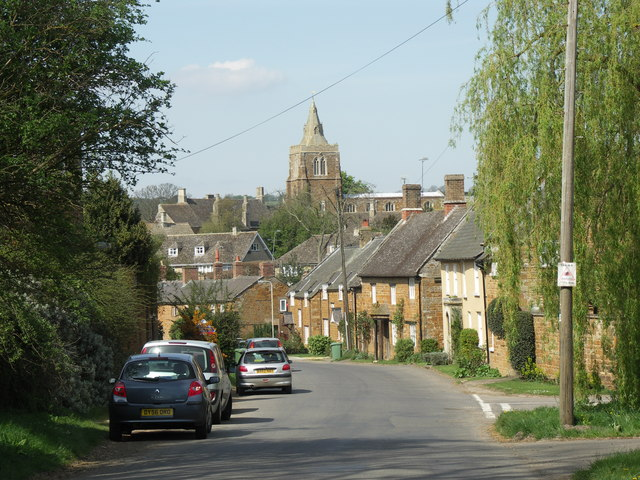
- The road into Lyddington from the south

- Location within Rutland
- Area: 3.32 sq mi (8.6 km^{2})
- Population: 383 (2021 census)
  - Density: 115/sq mi (44/km^{2})
- OS grid reference: SP875969
  - London: 78 miles (126 km) SSE
- Civil parish: Lyddington
- Unitary authority: Rutland
- Ceremonial county: Rutland
- Region: East Midlands
- Country: England
- Sovereign state: United Kingdom
- Post town: Oakham
- Postcode district: LE15
- Dialling code: 01572
- Police: Leicestershire
- Fire: Leicestershire
- Ambulance: East Midlands
- UK Parliament: Rutland and Stamford

Lyddington is a village and civil parish in the county of Rutland in the East Midlands of England. The population of the parish was 383 at the 2021 census.

The village's name origin is uncertain. Perhaps, 'farm/settlement of Hlyda' or 'farm/settlement with a noisy stream'.

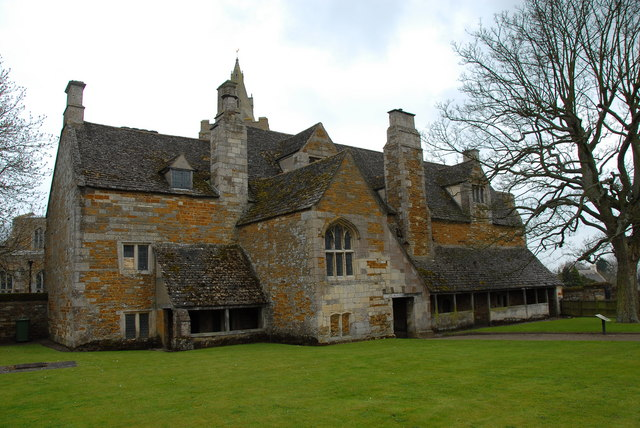
The Bedehouse

Lyddington Bede House, owned by English Heritage, is a Grade I listed building incorporating parts of a medieval bishop's palace. In 1547 it was seized on behalf of the king from the bishops of Lincoln and later passed to Lord Burghley. In 1600 part of the palace was converted into an almshouse and it continued in this use until 1930. The remains of the fishponds of the bishop's palace are nearby.

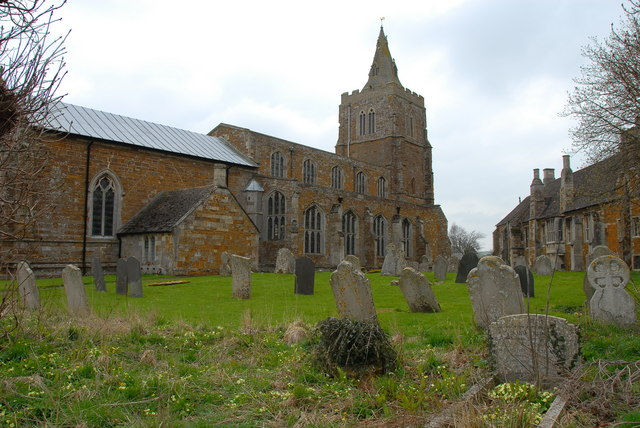
St Andrew's Church, Lyddington

St Andrew's Church is also Grade I listed.

There are two public houses, The Marquess of Exeter and The Old White Hart.

== Broadband connection ==
Residents of Lyddington raised £37,000 to offer 200 homes the super-fast broadband that BT could not deliver. The broadband connection was upgraded in 2010 by Rutland Telecom using a technique called sub-loop unbundling and residents had broadband speeds of up to 25 Mbit/s. This was the first time in the UK that fibre to the cabinet technology was used in a rural village.

== Demographics ==
Census population of Lyddington parish
Census	Population	Female	Male	Households	Source
2001	397	204	193	162	
2011	366	189	177	160	
2021	383	200	183	168	
