= Catchiness =

Quality of a song that refers to ease of remembrance

Catchiness is how easy it is for a song, tune, or phrase to be recalled. It is often taken into account when writing songs, catchphrases, advertising slogans, jingles etc. Alternatively, it can be defined as how difficult it is for one to forget it. Songs that embody high levels of remembrance or catchiness are referred to as "catchy songs" or "earworms". While it is hard to scientifically explain what makes a song catchy, there are many documented techniques that recur throughout catchy music, such as repetition, hooks and alliteration. Selling Sounds: The Commercial Revolution in American Music says that "although there was no definition for what made a song catchy, all the songwriting guides agreed that simplicity and familiarity were vital".

The physical symptoms of listening to a catchy song include "running [it] over in our heads or tapping a foot". According to Todd Tremlin, catchy music "spread[s] because [it] resonates similarly from one mind to the next".

== Analysis ==
In an article written by psychologist Tom Stafford for BBC, the psychology of "earworms" (catchy songs) is discussed. These songs are referred to as earworms due to their parasitic characteristics; their entrance and exit from our mind cannot be controlled and despite our best efforts they may refuse to leave. In that aspect, catchiness, depending on how digestible the music is to the listener, has a level of annoyance unlike anything else. In this article Stafford reviews the work of neurologist Oliver Sacks and the conclusion by Sacks that this catchiness is due to the inherent repetitiveness of popular music, which can affect our ability to remember a song. It is concluded that since memory is powerfully affected by repetition that this could be a significant contributing factor to catchiness, though certainly not the only aspect. A song's catchiness may also be due to the auditory "slave system" of our inner ear, much like the visual slave system of our mind's eye.

Often, a song with few qualities can still become immensely popular due to its catchiness. According to T.C.W. Blanning: "I would sacrifice everything – rhyme, reason, sense, and sentiment to catchiness. There is... a very great art in making rubbish acceptable". A Billboard review explains that "any lack of originality (in the album The Remote Part) is more than made up for by the... catchiness of the musical arrangement"

For example, the 2011 song "Call Me Maybe" by Carly Rae Jepsen has been identified as a catchy song. An article by ABC News listed some of its "catchiness factors." The article explains that it has a chorus which is "melodically easy on the ear, simple enough to stay in your head all day, and is topically appealing to Jepsen’s target pop demographic." It also briefly describes the concept of musical incongruity and its use within the song. In music, incongruity refers to the inclusion of varied or irregular musical and lyrical features, such as mispronounced words or unexpected syllable accentuation. These incongruities are intended to capture the listener's attention and to preserve their level of interest throughout the song, regardless of the simple and otherwise repetitive lyrical content. Songwriter/producer Eve Nelson was quoted saying, "a five-year-old could probably sing this, because it’s just so easy." As well as having lyrical hooks, the music itself can also be considered a hook.

Musicologist Dr. Alison Pawley and psychologist Dr. Daniel Mullensiefen identified the following as factors of a song to incite singing along:

1. Longer and detailed musical phrases.
2. Higher number of pitches in the chorus hook.
3. Male vocalists
4. Higher male voices with noticeable vocal effort

Based on these factors, the researchers listed "We Are the Champions" by the British rock band Queen as the number one "sing-along song" in the UK.

A 2014 study by the University of Amsterdam and the Museum of Science and Industry in Manchester found "Wannabe" by the Spice Girls to be the catchiest pop song of the last 60 years in the UK. The study found that having a simple and relentless melody was the key to a song being "catchy". "We found, much to our surprise, that writing a very surprising and unusual hook is not the recipe for long term memorability,” musicologist Dr John Ashley Burgoyne explained. "Actually, the more conventional your melody in terms of the interval patterns that you use; in terms of the rhythms that you use, the easier the song is to remember over the long term. What makes Wannabe work so well is that it isn’t a difficult song to sing, it has a conventional melody that repeats itself a lot, and it’s just relentless."

Additionally, the book FutureHit DNA by Jay Frank says "Wannabe felt like it should have been a 3 1/2- to 4-minute pop song, just like every other hit at that time. To create that feeling, the producers cut the song at the knees. The last thing heard in the song is the a cappella line, 'If you wannabe my lover,' which is also the first lyric of the chorus. The audience has a natural desire to hear something to its completion. When they expect a song to go somewhere, they will not feel completely settled until that song resolves itself. 'Wannabe' never resolves, and therefore creates a situation where the listener cannot get the song out of his head."

== See also ==
- Levitin effect
- Music psychology
- Rhythm
- Timing (music)
