= A Field Guide to Lies =

2016 book by Daniel J. Levitin

A Field Guide to Lies: Critical Thinking in the Information Age (republished as Weaponized Lies: How to Think Critically in the Post-Truth Era)
- Author: Daniel J. Levitin
- Language: English
- Subjects: Critical thinking, skepticism
- Publisher: Dutton (US), Allen-Lane (Canada), Viking (U.K.)
- Publication date: September 2016
- Media type: Print (Hardcover)
- Pages: 304
- ISBN: 978-0-525-95522-1
- Preceded by: The Organized Mind
- Followed by: Successful Aging (in the UK, The Changing Mind)

A Field Guide to Lies: Critical Thinking in the Information Age is a bestselling book written by Daniel J. Levitin and originally published in 2016 by Dutton (Penguin Random House). It was published in 2017 in paperback with a revised introduction under the new title Weaponized Lies: How to Think Critically in the Post-truth Era; a new edition was published in 2019 under the title A Field Guide to Lies: Critical Thinking With Statistics and the Scientific Method.

It is a non-fiction book that aims to help people learn critical thinking skills, recognize logical fallacies and biases, and better test the veracity of information received through mass media. It won the Mavis Gallant Prize for non-fiction, The National Business Book Award, a Silver Medal from the Axiom Business Book Awards, and was a Donner Prize finalist. It has been published in 10 additional languages: Chinese, Dutch, Estonian, Finnish, Japanese, Korean, Portuguese, Romanian, Russian, and Slovenian.

== About the author ==
Daniel Levitin was, at the time of the publication of A Field Guide to Lies, dean of social sciences at the Minerva Schools at KGI, a faculty member at the Center for Executive Education at the Haas School of Business, UC Berkeley, and professor of psychology and behavioral neuroscience at McGill University. His interest in writing the guide developed in response to the overwhelming amount of information people receive through mass media on a daily basis and a desire to help people develop techniques to distinguish factual information from that which may be distorted, out-of-date, unscientific or in error.

== Overview ==
A Field Guide to Critical Thinking is a handbook for people who want to learn ways to examine the veracity of information that comes to them through a variety of media. Levitin notes that people "have a tendency to apply critical thinking only to things we disagree with". He demonstrates how people can be "fooled and misled by numbers and logic" and offers strategies to recognize cognitive biases, logical fallacies and evaluate the reliability of sites encountered on the Web.

In the book, Levitin discusses the importance of evaluating numbers, something that people fear, he asserts, but can cause people to be misled. He cautions that "statistics are not facts". Numbers, statistics, charts and graphs can (inadvertently or by design) be skewed to fit particular points of view and should not be taken at face value.

Other key concepts outlined in the book include recognizing confirmation bias and belief perseverance, which lead to snap decisions and faulty reasoning, checking the experts (not giving authority to people who speak outside their areas of expertise), assessing the reliability of studies or surveys, and, for science and health news, looking for control groups and avoiding single-study results.

"Critical thinking is not something you do once with an issue and then drop it. It's an active and ongoing process."

— Daniel Levitin

== Reception ==
Reviewers of A Field Guide to Lies have found the book to be an entertaining, timely, useful primer for "critical thinking in the information age". It was listed on bestseller lists in Canada and received the Mavis Gallant Prize for Non-Fiction, presented by the Quebec Writers' Federation in the same year it was published.

Criticisms of the book included the observation that readers may have encountered the topics (e.g. confirmation bias) covered in the book elsewhere, an overemphasis on "sophisticated probability theory that many readers are likely to find more intimidating than numbers", and picking the wrong sources of "expertise" in his discussion of American religious trends.

Samuel Arbesman posited that some readers might find the book "akin to eating your vegetables: something you recognize that you need to be familiar with but only if you are forced to learn it". He goes on to recommend the book and, in his view, the benefits of consuming "healthy information more regularly than the misinformation that is all around us".

"Ultimately, Mr. Levitin appears to be advocating a scientific mind-set in how we approach the world around us and the information within it, constantly querying what we encounter with a skeptical and critical eye."

— Samuel Arbesman

Favorable reviews included that it is "entertaining and engaging".

"The timing could not be better ... for Daniel J. Levitin's new book... a survival manual for the post-factual era...in the struggle against error and ignorance, lies and mistakes, he is both engaging and rewarding." — Literary Review of Canada

The book was endorsed by a large number of prominent scientists and academics, including Charles Wheelan (Dartmouth), Jasper Rine (UC Berkeley), Isabelle Bajeux-Besnainou (CMU), and Janice Stein (University of Toronto).
