= Daniel Levitin =

American psychologist (born 1957)

Daniel J. Levitin
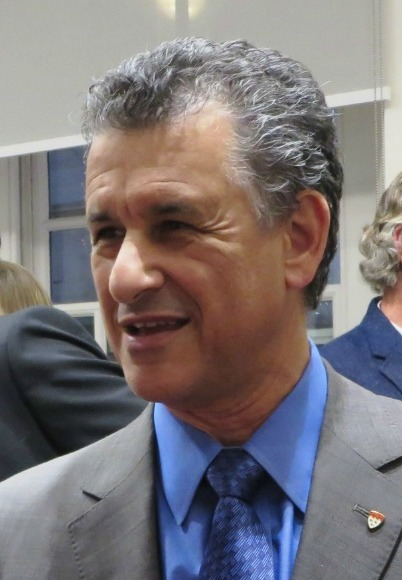
- Levitin in 2015
- Born: December 27, 1957 (age 68); San Francisco, California, U.S.
- Education: Massachusetts Institute of Technology; Berklee College of Music; Stanford University (B.A., 1992); University of Oregon (MSc, 1993; PhD, 1996).
- Known for: Levitin effect, This Is Your Brain on Music, The World in Six Songs, The Organized Mind, A Field Guide to Lies, Successful Aging (published as The Changing Mind in the U.K.), I Heard There Was A Secret Chord (published as Music As Medicine in the U.K.)
- Awards: See "Awards" section
- Scientific career
- Fields: Music cognition, cognitive neuroscience of music, cognitive psychology
- Workplaces: McGill University; Stanford University; Dartmouth College; University of California at Berkeley; Minerva University; Interval Research Corporation
- Academic advisors: Roger Shepard, Michael Posner, Douglas Hintzman, John R. Pierce, Stephen Palmer
- Notable students: Regina Nuzzo, Susan Rogers
- Website: daniellevitin.com levitinlab.com

Daniel Joseph Levitin, FRSC (born December 27, 1957) is an American-Canadian polymath, cognitive psychologist, neuroscientist, writer, musician, and record producer. He is the author of four New York Times best-selling books, including This Is Your Brain on Music: The Science of a Human Obsession, (Dutton/Penguin 2006; Plume/Penguin 2007) which has sold more than 1.5 million copies.

Levitin is the James McGill Professor Emeritus of psychology, behavioral neuroscience and music at McGill University in Montreal, Quebec, Canada; Founding Dean of Arts & Humanities at Minerva University; and a Distinguished Faculty Fellow at the Haas School of Business, University of California at Berkeley. He is the Director of the Laboratory for Music Perception, Cognition, and Expertise at McGill. He is a former member of the Board of Governors of the Grammys, a consultant to the Rock and Roll Hall of Fame, an elected fellow of the American Association for the Advancement of Science, a fellow of the Association for Psychological Science, a fellow of the Psychonomic Society, and a fellow of the Royal Society of Canada (FRSC). He has appeared frequently as a guest commentator on NPR and CBC. He has published scientific articles on absolute pitch, music cognition, neuroanatomy, and directional statistics.

His six books have all been international bestsellers, and collectively have sold more than 3 million copies worldwide: This Is Your Brain on Music: The Science of a Human Obsession (2006), The World in Six Songs: How the Musical Brain Created Human Nature (2008), The Organized Mind: Thinking Straight in the Age of Information Overload (2014), A Field Guide to Lies: Critical Thinking in the Information Age (2016) and Successful Aging (2020). I Heard There Was A Secret Chord: Music As Medicine was released in August 2024 by W. W. Norton, receiving advance praise from Paul McCartney, Neil DeGrasse Tyson, Bob Weir, Michael Connelly and others.

Levitin also worked as a music consultant, producer and sound designer on albums by Blue Öyster Cult, Chris Isaak, and Joe Satriani among others; produced punk bands including MDC and The Afflicted; and served as a consultant on albums by artists including Steely Dan, Stevie Wonder, and Michael Brook; and as a recording engineer for Santana, Jonathan Richman, O.J. Ekemode and the Nigerian Allstars, and The Grateful Dead. Records and CDs to which he has contributed have sold more than 30 million copies.

== Biography and education ==
Daniel Levitin was born in San Francisco, the son of Lloyd Levitin, a businessman and professor, and Sonia Levitin, a novelist. He was raised in Daly City, Moraga, and Palos Verdes, all in California. He graduated after his junior year at Palos Verdes High School to attend the Massachusetts Institute of Technology where he studied applied mathematics; he later enrolled at the Berklee College of Music before dropping out of college to join a succession of bands, work as a record producer, and help found a record label, 415 Records. He returned to school in his thirties, studying cognitive psychology/cognitive science first at Stanford University where he received a BA degree in 1992 (with honors and highest university distinction) and then at the University of Oregon where he received an MSc degree in 1993 and a PhD degree in 1996. He completed post-doctoral fellowships at Paul Allen's Silicon Valley think-tank Interval Research, at Stanford University Medical School, and at the University of California, Berkeley. His early influences include Susan Carey, Merrill Garrett, and Molly Potter and his scientific mentors include Roger Shepard, Karl H. Pribram, Michael Posner, Douglas Hintzman, John R. Pierce, and Stephen Palmer. He has been a visiting professor at the University of California, Berkeley, Stanford University, Dartmouth College, and Oregon Health Sciences University.

As a cognitive neuroscientist specializing in music perception and cognition, he is credited for fundamentally changing the way that scientists think about auditory memory, showing through the Levitin Effect, that long-term memory preserves many of the details of musical experience that previous theorists regarded as lost during the encoding process. He is also known for drawing attention to the role of cerebellum in music listening, including tracking the beat and distinguishing familiar from unfamiliar music.

Outside of his academic pursuits Levitin has worked on and off as a stand-up comedian and joke writer, performing at the Democratic National Convention in San Francisco with Robin Williams in 1984, and at comedy clubs in California; he placed second in the National Lampoon stand-up comedy competition regionals in San Francisco in 1989, and has contributed jokes for Jay Leno and Arsenio Hall, as well as the nationally syndicated comic strip Bizarro. Some comics were included in the 2006 compilation Bizarro and Other Strange Manifestations of the Art of Dan Piraro (Andrews McMeel).

In his twenties, an encounter with orthodox Jews offering tefillin at the Western Wall prompted Levitin to study Judaism more deeply. He later learned Jewish prayer, tefillin practice, synagogue service leadership, and the Amidah, and he and his wife study Torah together.

== Music ==
Levitin began playing piano at age 4. He took up clarinet at age 8, and bass clarinet and saxophone at age 12. He played saxophone (tenor and baritone) in high school; at age 17 he performed on baritone with the big band backing up Mel Tormé at the Santa Monica Civic Auditorium. He began playing guitar at age 20 and has been a member of bands including The Alsea River Band (lead guitar), The Mortals (bass), Judy Garland [band] (bass), The Shingles (lead guitar), Slings & Arrows (bass), JD Buhl (bass and guitar). He also played on recording sessions for Blue Öyster Cult, True West, and the soundtrack to Repo Man.

He continues to perform regularly and has played saxophone with Sting, Ben Sidran, and Bobby McFerrin, played guitar with Rosanne Cash, Blue Öyster Cult, Rodney Crowell, Michael Brook, Gary Lucas, Victor Wooten, Steve Bailey, Peter Case, Peter Himmelman, Lenny Kaye, Jessie Farrell, and David Byrne; and appeared on vocals with Renée Fleming, Neil Young and Rosanne Cash. In the fall of 2017 he toured the West Coast with singer-songwriter Tom Brosseau.

He began writing songs at age 17. His songwriting has been praised by a number of top songwriters including Diane Warren, and Joni Mitchell, who said, "Dan is really good at what he does, and creates rich images with his words and music."

He released his first album of original songs, Turnaround, in January 2020 with a performance with his own band at the Rockwood Music Hall in New York City, followed by seven shows with Victor Wooten's Bass Extremes band in Los Angeles, Oakland, and Phoenix, and a performance of one of the album's songs "Just A Memory" with Renée Fleming, Victor Wooten and Hardy Hemphill sponsored by John F. Kennedy Center for the Performing Arts.

== Music producing and engineering ==
Daniel Levitin
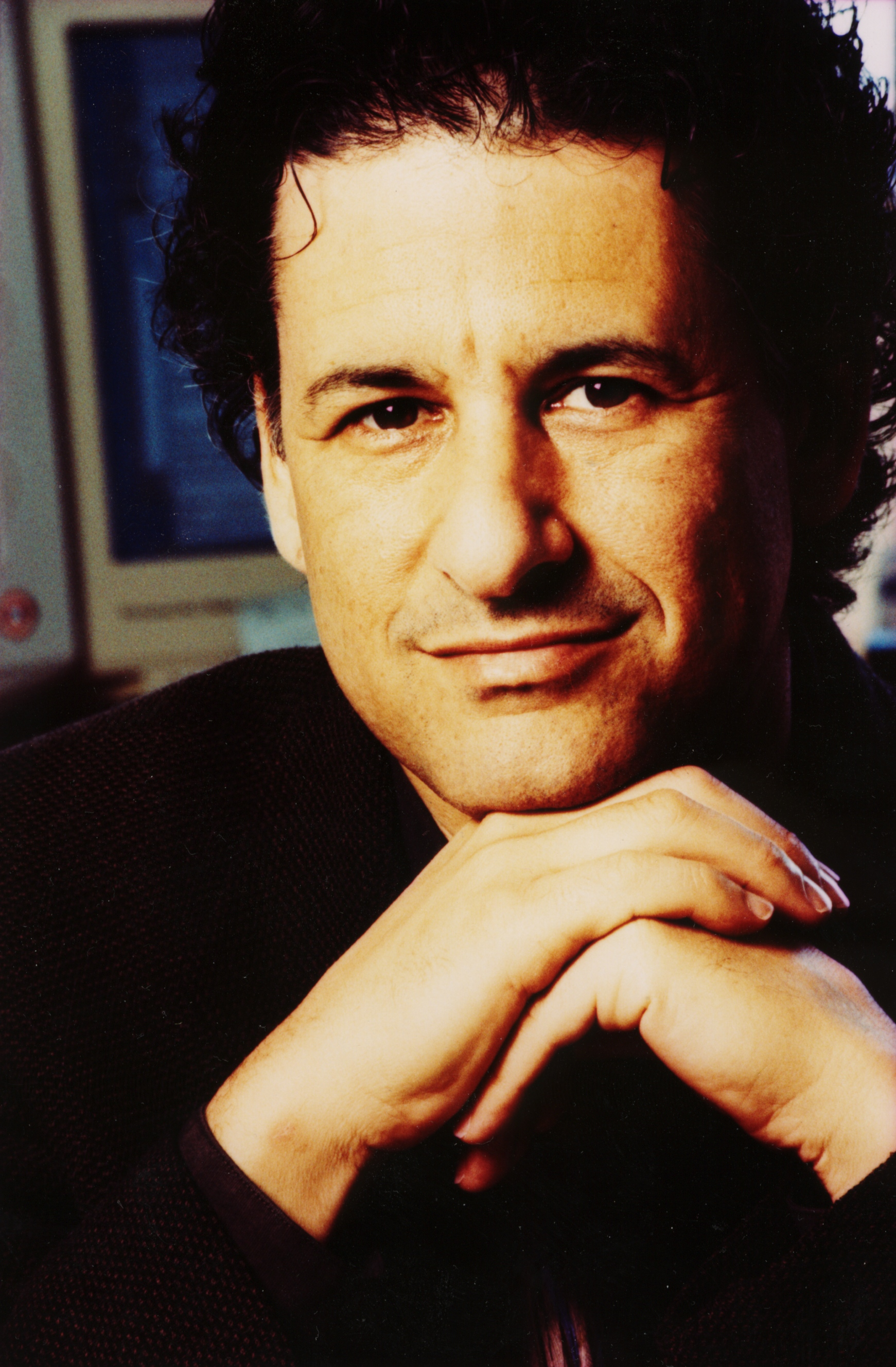

Background information
- Born: Daniel Joseph Levitin; December 27, 1957 (age 68)
- Origin: San Francisco
- Genres: Rock, new wave, punk, jazz, folk rock, country
- Occupations: Producer, Engineer, Musician
- Instruments: Tenor saxophone, guitar, bass, vocals
- Years active: 1980 to present
- Labels: 415 Records, Columbia Records, Sony Music, Warner Bros. Records, Infrasonic Records, TwinTone Records

In the late 1970s, Levitin consulted for M&K Sound (Jonas Miller and Ken Kreisel, Beverly Hills) as an expert listener assisting in the design of the first commercial satellite and subwoofer loudspeaker systems, an early version of which was used by Steely Dan for mixing their album Pretzel Logic (1974). After that he worked at A Broun Sound (John Harrison, in Terra Linda, San Rafael, California), re-coning speakers for The Grateful Dead for whom he later worked as a consulting record producer. Levitin was one of the golden ears used in the first Dolby AC audio compression tests, a precursor to MP3 audio compression. From 1984 to 1988, he worked as the director, then vice president of A&R for 415 Records in San Francisco, becoming the president of the label in 1989 before the label was sold to Sony Music. Notable achievements during that time included producing the punk classic Here Come the Cops by The Afflicted (named among the Top 10 records of 1985 by GQ magazine); engineering records by Jonathan Richman and the Modern Lovers, Santana, and the Grateful Dead; and producing tracks for Blue Öyster Cult, the soundtrack to Repo Man (1984), and others. Two highlights of his tenure in A&R were discovering the band The Big Race (which later became the well-known soundtrack band Pray for Rain), and he had the opportunity to sign M.C. Hammer but passed.

After 415 was sold, he formed his own production and business consulting company, with a list of clients including AT&T, several venture capital firms, and every major record label. As a consultant for Warner Bros. Records he planned the marketing campaigns for such albums as Eric Clapton's Unplugged (1992) and k.d. lang's Ingénue (1992). He was a music consultant on feature films such as Good Will Hunting (1997) and The Crow: City of Angels (1996), and served as a compilation consultant to Stevie Wonder's Song Review: A Greatest Hits Collection (1996), and to As Time Goes By (2003) and Interpretations: A 25th Anniversary Celebration (1995; updated and released as a DVD in 2003) by The Carpenters. Levitin returned to the studio in 2002, producing three albums for Quebec blues musician Dale Boyle: String Slinger Blues (2002), A Dog Day for the Purists (2004), and In My Rearview Mirror: A Story From A Small Gaspé Town (2005), the latter two of which won the annual Lys Blues Award for best Blues album. He helped Joni Mitchell with the production of her three most recent albums, Shine, Love Has Many Faces: A Quartet, A Ballet, Waiting to Be Danced, and Starbucks' Artist's Choice: Joni Mitchell.

In 1998, Levitin helped to found MoodLogic.com (and its sister companies, Emotioneering.com and jaboom.com), the first Internet music recommendation company, sold in 2006 to Allmusic group. He has also consulted for the United States Navy on underwater sound source separation, for Philips Electronics, and AT&T. He was an occasional script consultant to The Mentalist from 2007 to 2009.

== Writing career ==
Levitin began writing articles in 1988 for music industry magazines Billboard, Grammy, EQ, Mix, Music Connection, and Electronic Musician, and was named contributing writer to Billboard′s Reviews section from 1992 to 1997. He has contributed to The New York Times, The Wall Street Journal, The Washington Post, The New Yorker, and The Atlantic.

Levitin is the author of This Is Your Brain on Music: The Science of a Human Obsession, (Dutton/Penguin 2006; Plume/Penguin 2007) which spent more than 12 months on the New York Times and the Globe and Mail bestseller lists. In that book, he shares observations related to all sorts of music listeners, telling for instance that, today, teenagers listen to more music in one month than their peers living during the 1700s during their entire existence. The book was nominated for two awards (The Los Angeles Times Book Prize for Outstanding Science & Technology Writing and the Quill Award for the Best Debut Author of 2006), named one of the top books of the year by Canada's The Globe and Mail and by The Independent and The Guardian, and has been translated into 20 languages. The World in Six Songs: How the Musical Brain Created Human Nature (Dutton/Penguin 2008) debuted on the Canadian and the New York Times bestseller lists, and was named by the Boston Herald and by Seed Magazine as one of the best books of 2008. It was also nominated for the World Technology Awards.

The Organized Mind was published by Dutton/Penguin Random House in 2014, debuting at #2 on the New York Times Bestseller List and reaching #1 on the Canadian best-seller lists. A Field Guide to Lies was published by Dutton/Penguin Random House in 2016, and released in paperback in March 2017 under the revised title Weaponized Lies. It appeared on numerous best-seller lists in the U.S., Canada and the U.K., and is the most acclaimed of Levitin's four books, receiving the National Business Book Award, the Mavis Gallant Prize for Non-Fiction, the Axiom Business Book Award, and was a finalist for the Donner Prize.

Successful Aging: A Neuroscientist Explores the Power and Potential of Our Lives was published by Dutton/Penguin Random House in January 2020 and debuted at #10 on the New York Times bestseller list in its first week of release, and at #2 on the Canadian bestseller list, and stayed on the Canadian bestseller lists for more than six months. It was named an Apple Books book-of-the-month and Next Big Idea Club selection. It was published by Penguin Life in the U.K. as The Changing Mind: A Neuroscientist's Guide to Ageing Well; it debuted at #5 on the Sunday Times Bestseller List. It was named by the Sunday Times as one of the best books of 2020.

== In popular culture ==
In The Listener TV series, actor Colm Feore says his performance of the character Ray is based on Daniel Levitin.

Levitin consulted on the legal strategy used by Jimmy Page and Led Zeppelin to defend copyright infringement claim against his song Stairway To Heaven.

== Media appearances ==
From September 2006 to April 2007 Levitin served as a weekly commentator on the CBC Radio One show Freestyle. Two documentary films were based on This Is Your Brain on Music: The Music Instinct (2009, PBS), which he co-hosted with Bobby McFerrin, and The Musical Brain (2009, CTV/National Geographic Television) which he co-hosted with Sting. Levitin appeared in Artifact, a 2012 documentary directed by Jared Leto. His television and film appearances have reached more than 50 million viewers worldwide.

Levitin had a cameo appearance in The Big Bang Theory at the invitation of the producers, in Season 8, Episode 5, "The Focus Attenuation". He appeared in the opening scene, sitting at a table in the Caltech cafeteria over Sheldon's right shoulder. In January 2015 he was a guest on BBC Radio 4's Start the Week program alongside cognitive scientist Margaret Boden.

In 2019–2020 he was a script consultant and on-air guest for Season 8 of National Geographic's Brain Games. In 2020, he appeared in Stewart Copeland's Adventures in Music series on BBC Four, discussing the evolutionary basis of music and the neuroscience of music.

== Awards ==
- Finalist, Donner Prize (2017), A Field Guide to Lies.
- Winner, National Business Book Award (2017), A Field Guide to Lies.
- Silver Medal, Axiom Business Book Awards, Ethics category (2017), A Field Guide to Lies.
- Winner, Mavis Gallant Prize for Non-Fiction (2016), A Field Guide to Lies.
- Finalist, Los Angeles Times Book Prize (2006), This Is Your Brain on Music, Best Book on Science and Technology.
- Cine Special Jury Prize for Arts & Culture, The Music Instinct (Daniel Levitin, co-host, co-writer and chief scientific consultant), 2010, Washington, D.C.
- Banff World Television Festival, Rockie Award Nominee, The Music Instinct (Daniel Levitin, co-host, co-writer and chief scientific consultant), 2010.
- First place, Pariscience Film Festival, The Music Instinct (Daniel Levitin, co-host, co-writer and chief scientific consultant), 2009.
- Winner, Gemini Award, Best Sound in an Information/Documentary Program or Series, The Musical Brain (Daniel Levitin, host and scientific consultant), 2009.
- Hugo Television Award, Science/Nature Documentary, 45th Chicago International Film Festival, The Musical Brain (Daniel Levitin, host and scientific consultant), 2009.
- European Acoustics Association (EAA) Award for Outstanding Scientific Results Published in Acta Acustica United With Acustica (with co-recipients C. Guastavino, J-D Pollack, D. Dubois and B. Katz), 2008.
- Nominee, Quill Award, Best Debut Author (2006), This Is Your Brain on Music.
- Awarded sixteen RIAA gold and platinum records.
  - Stevie Wonder, Song Review: A Greatest Hits Collection
  - Eric Clapton, Unplugged
  - Steely Dan, Can't Buy A Thrill
  - Steely Dan, Countdown to Ecstasy
  - Steely Dan, Pretzel Logic
  - Steely Dan, Katy Lied
  - Steely Dan, The Royal Scam
  - Steely Dan, Aja
  - Steely Dan, Gaucho
  - Steely Dan, Two Against Nature
  - Steely Dan, Gold (Steely Dan album), expanded edition
  - Steely Dan, A Decade of Steely Dan
  - K.d. lang, Ingenue
  - Midnight Oil, Diesel and Dust
  - Chris Isaak, Heart Shaped World
  - The Crow: City of Angels (soundtrack)
- Best Film Soundtrack award, Sundance Film Festival, 1985, for Architects of Victory
- Gold Medal, Venice Film Festival, 1985, Film Soundtrack Production, for Architects of Victory
- Lys Award, Best Blues Album, 2005, Dale Boyle: In My Rearview Mirror: A Story From A Small Gaspé Town
- Lys Award, Best Blues Album 2004, Dale Boyle and the Barburners: A Dog Day for Purists
- "Top 100 Papers in Cognitive Science" by the Millennium Project for "Absolute Memory for Musical Pitch," Perception and Psychophysics, 1994.

== Selected publications ==
=== Books ===
- The Billboard Encyclopedia of Record Producers (1999). New York: Watson-Guptill Publications, E. Olsen, C. Wolff, P. Verna, Editors; D. J. Levitin, associate editor.
- Foundations of Cognitive Psychology: Core Readings (2002), Cambridge, MA: M.I.T. Press
- Foundations of Cognitive Psychology: Core Readings, Second Edition (2010), Boston: Allyn & Bacon/Pearson Publishing
- This Is Your Brain on Music: The Science of a Human Obsession, (2006), New York: Dutton/Penguin. (released in the U.K. and Commonwealth territories by Atlantic, 2007). (appeared on the New York Times Bestseller List both in hardcover and paperback)
- The World in Six Songs: How the Musical Brain Created Human Nature (2008), New York: Dutton/Penguin and Toronto: Viking/Penguin. (New York Times bestseller)
- The Organized Mind: Thinking Straight in the Age of Information Overload (2014), New York: Dutton/Penguin Random House and Toronto: Allen Lane/Penguin Random House and London: Viking/Penguin Random House.
- A Field Guide to Lies: Critical Thinking in the Information Age (2016), New York: Dutton/Penguin Random House; Toronto: Allen Lane/Penguin Random House; London: Viking/Penguin Random House
- Successful Aging: A Neuroscientist Explores the Power and Potential of Our Lives (2020), New York: Dutton/Penguin Random House; Toronto: Allen Lane/Penguin Random House; London: Penguin Life.
- I Heard There Was A Secret Chord: Music as Medicine (2024), New York: W.W. Norton & Company.

=== Scientific articles (selected) ===
- Levitin, D. J.; Grafton, S. T. (2016). "Measuring the representational space of music with fMRI: a case study with Sting". Neurocase. 22 (6): 548–567. doi:10.1080/13554794.2016.1216572. PMID 27687156. S2CID 3985554.
- Chanda, M. L.; Levitin, D. J. (2013). "The neurochemistry of music". Trends in Cognitive Sciences. 17 (4): 179–193. doi:10.1016/j.tics.2013.02.007. PMID 23541122. S2CID 14608078.
- Sridharan, D.; Levitin, D. J.; Menon, V. (2008). "A critical role for the right fronto-insular cortex in switching between central-executive and default-mode networks". Proceedings of the National Academy of Sciences. 105 (34): 12569–12574. Bibcode:2008PNAS..10512569S. doi:10.1073/pnas.0800005105. PMC 2527952. PMID 18723676.
- Langford, D. J.; Crager, S. E.; Shehzad, Z.; Smith, S. B.; Sotocinal, S. G.; Levenstadt, J. S.; Chanda, M. L.; Levitin, D. J.; Mogil, J. S. (2006). "Social Modulation of Pain as Evidence for Empathy in Mice". Science. 312 (5782): 1967–1970. Bibcode:2006Sci...312.1967L. doi:10.1126/science.1128322. PMID 16809545. S2CID 26027821.
- Levitin, D. J.; Cook, P. R. (1996). "Absolute memory for musical tempo: Additional evidence that auditory memory is absolute". Perception & Psychophysics. 58 (6): 927–935. doi:10.3758/bf03205494. PMID 8768187.

=== Discography ===
- J.D. Buhl, Remind Me. Driving Records/CD Baby, 2015. (Producer and Engineer).
- Diane Nalini, Songs of Sweet Fire. 2006. (Mixing Engineer, Production Consultant).
- Dale Boyle, In My Rearview Mirror: A Story From A Small Gaspé Town. 2005. (Production Consultant)
- Dale Boyle and the Barburners, A Dog Day for the Purists. 2004. (Producer).
- Dale Boyle and the Barburners, String Slinger Blues. 2002. (Producer).
- The Carpenters. As Time Goes By. A&M Records/Universal, 2000. (Consultant on song selection, liner notes writer.)
- Various Artists. Original motion picture soundtrack, Good Will Hunting. Hollywood/Miramax Records, 1998. (A&R Consultant. )
- Stevie Wonder discographyStevie Wonder. Stevie Wonder Song Review: A Greatest Hits Collection. Motown, 1996. (Consultant on song selection. Liner notes writer.)
- Steely Dan, Gold, Decade, Gaucho, Aja, The Royal Scam, Katy Lied, Pretzel Logic, Countdown to Ecstasy, Can't Buy A Thrill, MCA, 1992. (Consultant on CD Remastering.) [source?]
- kd lang, Ingénue, Reprise, 1992. (Consultant.)
- Eric Clapton, Unplugged, Reprise, 1992. (Consultant.)
- Chris Isaak, Heart Shaped World, Warner Brothers, 1989. (Engineering (Asst), Sound Design (Soundscape)).
- Jonathan Richman and the Modern Lovers, Rockin' and Romance, Twin/Tone (U.S), Sire (U.K.), 1986. (Engineer).
- The Furies, Fun Around The World, Infrasonic, 1986
- Rhythm Riot, Rhythm Riot, EP, Infrasonic, 1987*True West, Drifters, Passport/JEM Records, 1985. (co-producer).
- The Big Race, "Happy Animals," from the Soundtrack of the Paramount Film Repo Man, 1985. (Producer, Engineer)
- The Afflicted, Good News About Mental Health, Infrasonic, 1984. (Producer)
- International P.E.A.C.E. Benefit Compilation, R Radical Records, 1984 (Producer of tracks by The Afflicted and MDC), reissued 1997 New Red Archives/Lumberjack Mordam Music Group

== Filmography ==
Film
Year	Film	Role	Notes
1984	Repo Man	Self, musician	
1997	Close To You: Remembering the Carpenters	Self, Consultant to the producers	PBS
1998	The Carpenters: Harmony and Heartbreak	Consultant to the Producers	A&E Biography
2009	The Music Instinct	Self, writer, consultant	PBS Nova
2009	The Musical Brain	Self, Writer; Consultant	CTV/National Geographic
2012	Artifact	Self	
2012	What Makes a Masterpiece	Self	BBC 4

== See also ==
- John P. D'Arcy
