= Psychology of music =

Branch of both psychology and musicology

The psychology of music, or music psychology, is a branch of psychology, cognitive science, neuroscience, and/or musicology. It aims to explain and understand musical behaviour and experience, including the processes through which music is perceived, created, responded to, and incorporated into everyday life. Modern work in the psychology of music is primarily empirical; its knowledge tends to advance on the basis of interpretations of data collected by systematic observation of and interaction with human participants. In addition to its basic-science role in the cognitive sciences, the field has practical relevance for many areas, including music performance, composition, education, criticism, and therapy; investigations of human attitude, skill, performance, intelligence, creativity, and social behavior; and links between music and health.

The psychology of music can shed light on non-psychological aspects of musicology and musical practice. For example, it contributes to music theory through investigations of the perception and computational modelling of musical structures such as melody, harmony, tonality, rhythm, meter, and form. Research in music history can benefit from systematic study of the history of musical syntax, or from psychological analyses of composers and compositions in relation to perceptual, affective, and social responses to their music.

== History ==
=== Early history (pre-1850) ===
The study of sound and musical phenomena prior to the 19th century was focused primarily on the mathematical modelling of pitch and tone. The earliest recorded experiments date from the 6th century BCE, most notably in the work of Pythagoras and his establishment of the simple string length ratios that formed the consonances of the octave. This view that sound and music could be understood from a purely physical standpoint was echoed by such theorists as Anaxagoras and Boethius. An important early dissenter was Aristoxenus, who foreshadowed the modern psychology of music in his view that music could only be understood through human perception and its relation to human memory. Despite his views, the majority of musical education through the Middle Ages and Renaissance remained rooted in the Pythagorean tradition, particularly through the quadrivium of astronomy, geometry, arithmetic, and music.

Research by Vincenzo Galilei (father of Galileo) demonstrated that, when string length was held constant, varying its tension, thickness, or composition could alter perceived pitch. From this, he argued that simple ratios were not enough to account for musical phenomenon and that a perceptual approach was necessary. He also claimed that the differences between various tuning systems were not perceivable, thus the disputes were unnecessary. Study of topics including vibration, consonance, the harmonic series, and resonance were furthered through the Scientific Revolution, including work by Galileo, Kepler, Mersenne, and Descartes. This included further speculation concerning the nature of the sense organs and higher-order processes, particularly by Savart, Helmholtz, and Koenig.

=== Rise of empirical study (1860–1960) ===
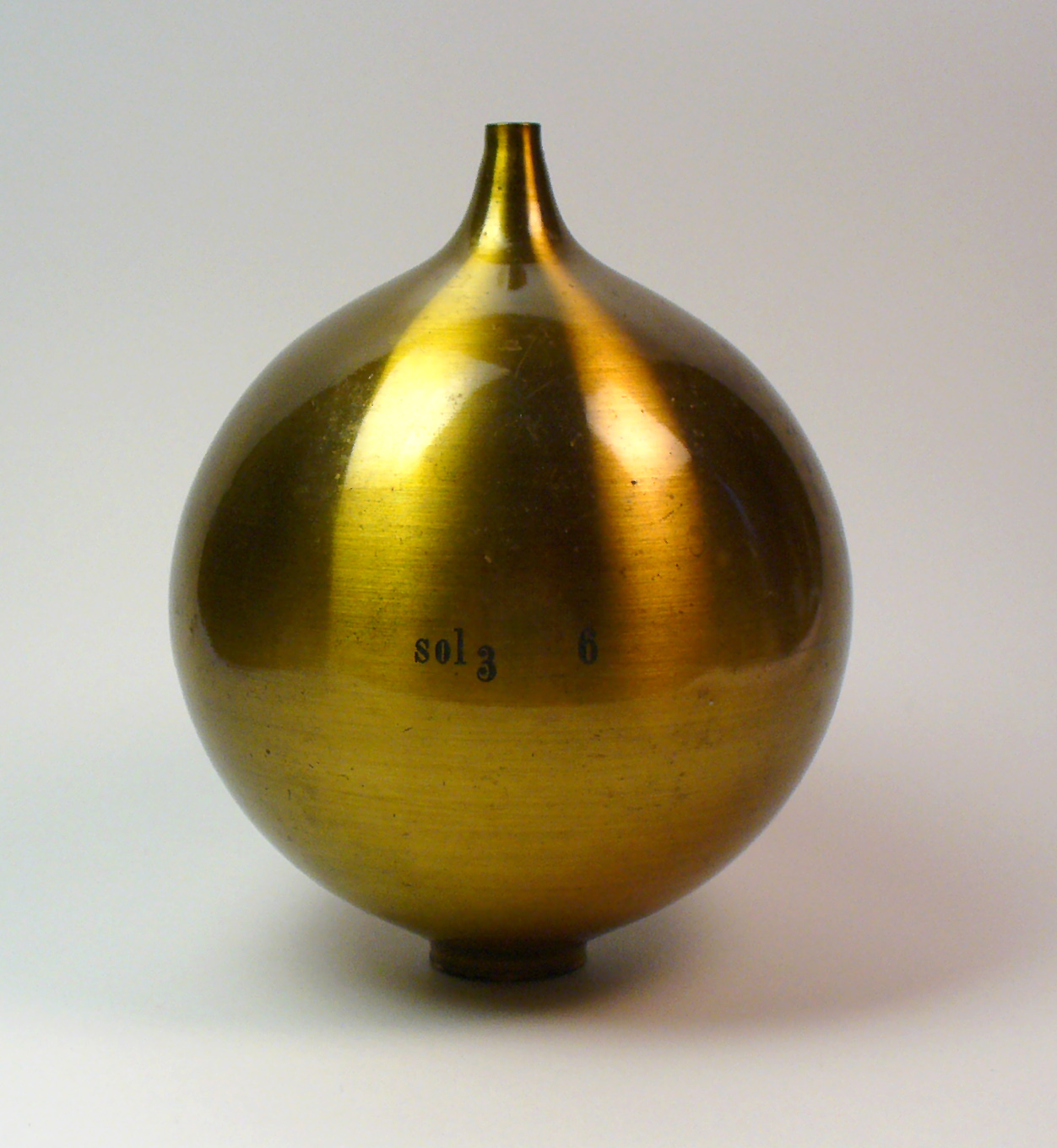
A brass, spherical Helmholtz resonator based on his original design, circa 1890–1900

The latter 19th century saw the development of the psychology of music alongside the emergence of a general empirical psychology, one which passed through similar stages of development. The first was structuralist psychology, led by Wilhelm Wundt, which sought to break down experience into its smallest definable parts. This expanded upon previous centuries of acoustic study, and included Helmholtz developing the resonator to isolate and understand pure and complex tones and their perception, the philosopher Carl Stumpf using church organs and his own musical experience to explore timbre and absolute pitch, and Wundt himself associating the experience of rhythm with kinesthetic tension and relaxation.

As structuralism gave way to Gestalt psychology and behaviorism at the turn of the century, the psychology of music moved beyond the study of isolated tones and elements to the perception of their inter-relationships and human reactions to them, though work languished behind that of visual perception. In Europe Géza Révész and Albert Wellek developed a more complex understanding of musical pitch, and in the US the focus shifted to that of music education and the training and development of musical skill. Carl Seashore led this work, producing his The Measurement of Musical Talents and The Psychology of Musical Talent. Seashore used bespoke equipment and standardized tests to measure how performance deviated from indicated markings and how musical aptitude differed between students.

European musicology was found in Greek. They were focused on the philosophy, and the concepts of any relations with music. Greek's several theories rose later to Arab and the Christians theories. Although their theories survived, they were also corrupted along the way, in the Middle Ages of Europe.

=== Modern (1960–present) ===
The psychology of music in the second half of the 20th century has expanded to cover a wide array of theoretical and applied areas. From the 1960s the field grew along with cognitive science, including such research areas as music perception (particularly of pitch, rhythm, harmony, and melody), musical development and aptitude, music performance, and affective responses to music.

This period has also seen the founding of journals, societies, conferences, research groups, centers, and degrees that each are specific to the psychology of music. This trend has brought research toward specific applications for music education, performance, and therapy. While the techniques of cognitive psychology allowed for more objective examinations of musical behavior and experience, the theoretical and technological advancements of neuroscience have greatly shaped the direction of the field into the 21st century.

While the majority of research in the psychology of music has focused on music in a Western context, the field has expanded along with ethnomusicology to examine how the perception and practice of music differs between cultures. It has also emerged into the public sphere. In recent years several bestselling popular science books have helped bring the field into public discussion, notably Daniel Levitin's This Is Your Brain On Music (2006) and The World in Six Songs (2008), Oliver Sacks' Musicophilia (2007), and Gary Marcus' Guitar Zero (2012). In addition, the controversial "Mozart effect" sparked lengthy debate among researchers, educators, politicians, and the public regarding the relationship between classical music listening, education, and intelligence.

== Research areas ==
=== Perception and cognition ===
Much work within the psychology of music seeks to understand the cognitive processes that support musical behaviors, including perception, comprehension, memory, attention, and performance. Originally arising in fields of psychoacoustics and sensation, cognitive theories of how people understand music more recently encompass neuroscience, cognitive science, music theory, music therapy, computer science, psychology, philosophy, and linguistics.

==== Affective response ====
Music has been shown to consistently elicit emotional responses in its listeners, and this relationship between human affect and music has been studied in depth. This includes isolating which specific features of a musical work or performance convey or elicit certain reactions, the nature of the reactions themselves, and how characteristics of the listener may determine which emotions are felt. The field draws upon and has significant implications for such areas as philosophy, musicology, and aesthetics, as well the acts of musical composition and performance. The implications for casual listeners are also great; research has shown that the pleasurable feelings associated with emotional music are the result of dopamine release in the striatum—the same anatomical areas that underpin the anticipatory and rewarding aspects of drug addiction. According to research, listening to music has been found to affect the mood of an individual. The main factors in whether it will affect that individual positively or negatively are based on the musics tempo and style. In addition, listening to music also increases cognitive functions, creativity, and decreases feelings of fatigue. All of these factors lead to better workflow and a more optimal result in the activity done while listening to music. This leads to the conclusion that listening to music while performing an activity is an excellent way of increasing productivity and the overall experience. It has been proposed that the ability to understand the emotional meaning of music might rely on the existence of a common neural system for processing the affective meaning of voices/vocalizations and musical sounds. In addition to emotional responses, music has influenced the lifestyles of individuals and changed people's perceptions of what "sexy" is. Although music cannot resolve all human beings needs, it is heavily relied on to alter the feelings and emotions.

=== Neuropsychology ===
A significant amount of research concerns brain-based mechanisms involved in the cognitive processes underlying music perception and bodily performance. These behaviours include music listening, performing, composing, reading, writing, and ancillary activities. It also is increasingly concerned with the brain basis for musical aesthetics and musical emotion. Scientists working in this field may have training in cognitive neuroscience, neurology, neuroanatomy, psychology, music theory, computer science, and other allied fields, and use such techniques as functional magnetic resonance imaging (fMRI), transcranial magnetic stimulation (TMS), magnetoencephalography (MEG), electroencephalography (EEG), and positron emission tomography (PET).

The cognitive process of performing music requires the interaction of neural mechanisms in both motor and auditory systems. Since every action expressed in a performance produces a sound that influences subsequent expression, this leads to impressive sensorimotor interplay.

==== Processing pitch ====
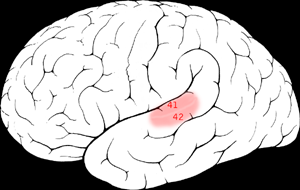
The primary auditory cortex is one of the main areas associated with superior pitch resolution.

Perceived pitch typically depends on the fundamental frequency, though the dependence could be mediated solely by the presence of harmonics corresponding to that fundamental frequency. The perception of a pitch without the corresponding fundamental frequency in the physical stimulus is called the pitch of the missing fundamental. Neurons lateral to A1 in marmoset monkeys were found to be sensitive specifically to the fundamental frequency of a complex tone, suggesting that pitch constancy may be enabled by such a neural mechanism.

Pitch constancy refers to the ability to perceive pitch identity across changes in acoustical properties, such as loudness, temporal envelope, or timbre. The importance of cortical regions lateral to A1 for pitch coding is also supported by studies of human cortical lesions and functional magnetic resonance imaging (fMRI) of the brain. These data suggest a hierarchical system for pitch processing, with more abstract properties of sound stimulus processed further along the processing pathways.

===== Absolute pitch =====
Absolute pitch (AP) is the ability to identify the pitch of a musical tone or to produce a musical tone at a given pitch without the use of an external reference pitch. Researchers estimate the occurrence of AP to be 1 in 10,000 people. The extent to which this ability is innate or learned is debated, with evidence for both a genetic basis and for a "critical period" in which the ability can be learned, especially in conjunction with early musical training.

==== Processing rhythm ====
Behavioural studies demonstrate that rhythm and pitch can be perceived separately, but that they also interact in creating a musical perception. Studies of auditory rhythm discrimination and reproduction in patients with brain injury have linked these functions to the auditory regions of the temporal lobe, but have shown no consistent localization or lateralization. Neuropsychological and neuroimaging studies have shown that the motor regions of the brain contribute to both perception and production of rhythms.

Even in studies where subjects only listen to rhythms, the basal ganglia, cerebellum, dorsal premotor cortex (dPMC) and supplementary motor area (SMA) are often implicated. The analysis of rhythm may depend on interactions between the auditory and motor systems.

==== Dynamics ====
Dynamics in music refers to the volume of the music, or how loud the music is. 25% of American adults have some form of hearing loss from exposure to loud noise excessively. Loud volume can cause hearing loss that can occur with one singular loud noise, or consistently listening to loud noises. High sound levels can damage the hairs in the inner ear that receive sound, which can cause permanent hearing loss.

Listening to music at lower volumes has been associated with reduced anxiety and blood pressure, as well as improvements in mood, alertness, and memory. Moderate listening levels may maximize these benefits while minimizing the risk of hearing damage, as excessively loud sound exposure can harm the delicate structures of the ear.

==== Neural correlates of musical training ====
Although auditory–motor interactions can be observed in people without formal musical training, musicians are an excellent population to study because of their long-established and rich associations between auditory and motor systems. Musicians have been shown to have anatomical adaptations that correlate with their training. Some neuroimaging studies have observed that musicians show lower levels of activity in motor regions than non-musicians during the performance of simple motor tasks, which may suggest a more efficient pattern of neural recruitment. Other studies have shown that early musical training may positively affect word reading, by promoting the specialization of an extra right-sided "note visual area" to process spatially relevant visual information (i.e., pentagram, bars, etc.) This neuroplastic effect might help prevent surface dyslexia. Music learning also involves the formation of novel audio visuomotor associations, which results in the ability to detect an incorrect association between sounds and the corresponding musical gestures, also allowing to learn how to play a musical instrument.

==== Motor imagery ====
Previous neuroimaging studies have consistently reported activity in the SMA and premotor areas, as well as in auditory cortices, when non-musicians imagine hearing musical excerpts. Recruitment of the SMA and premotor areas is also reported when musicians are asked to imagine performing.

=== Psychoacoustics ===
Psychoacoustics is the scientific study of sound perception. More specifically, it is the branch of science studying the psychological and physiological responses associated with sound (including speech and music). Topics of study include perception of the pitch, timbre, loudness and duration of musical sounds and the relevance of such studies for music cognition or the perceived structure of music; and auditory illusions and how humans localize sound, which can have relevance for musical composition and the design of venues for music performance. Psychoacoustics is a branch of psychophysics.

=== Cognitive musicology ===
Cognitive musicology is a branch of cognitive science concerned with computationally modeling musical knowledge with the goal of understanding both music and cognition.

Cognitive musicology can be differentiated from the fields of music cognition and cognitive neuroscience of music by a difference in methodological emphasis. Cognitive musicology uses computer modeling to study music-related knowledge representation and has roots in artificial intelligence and cognitive science. The use of computer models provides an exacting, interactive medium in which to formulate and test theories.

This interdisciplinary field investigates topics such as the parallels between language and music in the brain. Biologically inspired models of computation are often included in research, such as neural networks and evolutionary programs. This field seeks to model how musical knowledge is represented, stored, perceived, performed, and generated. By using a well-structured computer environment, the systematic structures of these cognitive phenomena can be investigated.

=== Evolutionary musicology ===
Evolutionary musicology concerns the "origin of music, the question of animal song, selection pressures underlying music evolution", and "music evolution and human evolution". It seeks to understand music perception and activity in the context of evolutionary theory. Charles Darwin speculated that music may have held an adaptive advantage and functioned as a protolanguage, a view which has spawned several competing theories of music evolution. An alternate view sees music as a by-product of linguistic evolution; a type of "auditory cheesecake" that pleases the senses without providing any adaptive function. This view has been directly countered by numerous music researchers.

=== Cultural differences ===
An individual's culture or ethnicity plays a role in their music cognition, including their preferences, emotional reaction, and musical memory. Musical preferences are biased toward culturally familiar musical traditions beginning in infancy, and adults' classification of the emotion of a musical piece depends on both culturally specific and universal structural features. Additionally, individuals' musical memory abilities are greater for culturally familiar music than for culturally unfamiliar music.

== Applied research areas ==
Some areas of research in the psychology of music focus on the application of music in everyday (XXI century obviously) life as well as the practices and experiences of the amateur and professional musician. Each topic may utilize knowledge and techniques derived from one or more of the areas described above. Such areas include:

=== Music in society ===
Including:

- everyday music listening
- musical rituals and gatherings (e.g. religious, festive, sporting, political, etc.)
- the role of music in forming personal and group identities
- the relation between music and dancing
- social influences on musical preference (peers, family, experts, social background, etc.)

==== Musical preference ====
Consumers' choices in music have been studied as they relate to the Big Five personality traits: openness to experience, agreeableness, extraversion, neuroticism, and conscientiousness. In general, the plasticity traits (openness to experience and extraversion) affect music preference more than the stability traits (agreeableness, neuroticism, and conscientiousness). Gender has been shown to influence preference, with men choosing music for primarily cognitive reasons and women for emotional reasons. Relationships with music preference have also been found with mood and nostalgic association.

==== Background music ====
The study of background music focuses on the impact of music with non-musical tasks, including changes in behavior in the presence of different types, settings, or styles of music. In laboratory settings, music can affect performance on cognitive tasks (memory, attention, and comprehension), both positively and negatively. Used extensively as an advertising aid, music may also affect marketing strategies, ad comprehension, and consumer choices. Background music can influence learning, working memory and recall, performance while working on tests, and attention in cognitive monitoring tasks. Background music can also be used as a way to relieve boredom, create positive moods, and maintain a private space. Background music has been shown to put a restless mind at ease by presenting the listener with various melodies and tones. It has been shown that listening to different types of music may modulate differently psychological mood and physiological responses associated with the induced emotions. For example, listening to atonal music might result in reduced heart rate (fear bradycardia) and increased blood pressure (both diastolic and systolic), possibly reflecting an increase in alertness and attention, psychological tension, and anxiety.

==== Music in marketing ====
In both radio and television advertisements, music plays an integral role in content recall, intentions to buy the product, and attitudes toward the advertisement and brand itself. Music's effect on marketing has been studied in radio ads, TV ads, and physical retail settings.

One of the most important aspects of an advertisement's music is the "musical fit", or the degree of congruity between cues in the ad and song content. Advertisements and music can be congruous or incongruous for both lyrical and instrumental music. The timbre, tempo, lyrics, genre, mood, as well as any positive or negative associations elicited by certain music should fit the nature of the advertisement and product.

==== Music and productivity ====
Several studies have recognized that listening to music while working affects the productivity of people performing complex cognitive tasks. One study suggested that listening to one's preferred genre of music can enhance productivity in the workplace, though other research has found that listening to music while working can be a source of distraction, with loudness and lyrical content possibly playing a role. Other factors proposed to affect the relationship between music listening and productivity include musical structure, task complexity, and degree of control over the choice and use of music.

=== Music education ===
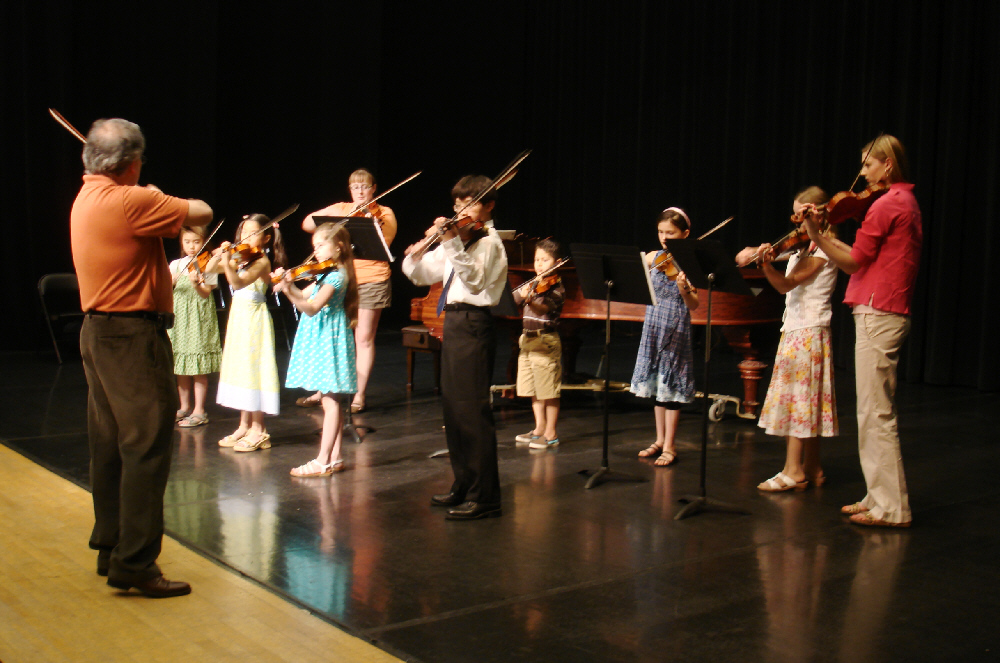
One primary focus of the psychology of music concerns how best to teach music and the effects this has on childhood development.

Including:

- optimizing music education
- development of musical behaviors and abilities throughout the lifespan
- the specific skills and processes involved in learning a musical instrument or singing
- activities and practices within a music school
- individual versus group learning of a musical instrument
- the effects of musical education on intelligence
- optimizing practice

==== Musical aptitude ====
Musical aptitude refers to a person's innate ability to acquire skills and knowledge required for musical activity, and may influence the speed at which learning can take place and the level that may be achieved. Study in this area focuses on whether aptitude can be broken into subsets or represented as a single construct, whether aptitude can be measured prior to significant achievement, whether high aptitude can predict achievement, to what extent aptitude is inherited, and what implications questions of aptitude have on educational principles.

It is an issue closely related to that of intelligence and IQ, and was pioneered by the work of Carl Seashore. While early tests of aptitude, such as Seashore's The Measurement of Musical Talent, sought to measure innate musical talent through discrimination tests of pitch, interval, rhythm, consonance, memory, etc., later research found these approaches to have little predictive power and to be influenced greatly by the test-taker's mood, motivation, confidence, fatigue, and boredom when taking the test.

=== Music performance ===
Including:

- the physiology of performance
- music reading and sight-reading, including eye movement
- performing from memory and music-related memory
- acts of improvisation and composition
- flow experiences
- the interpersonal/social aspects of group performance
- music performance quality evaluation by an audience or evaluator(s) (e.g. audition or competition), including the influence of musical and non-musical factors
- audio engineering

=== Music and health ===
==== Health benefits ====
Scientific studies suggest that singing can have positive effects on people's health. A preliminary study based on self-reported data from a survey of students participating in choral singing found perceived benefits including increased lung capacity, improved mood, stress reduction, as well as perceived social and spiritual benefits. However, one much older study of lung capacity compared those with professional vocal training to those without, and failed to back up the claims of increased lung capacity. Singing may positively influence the immune system through the reduction of stress. One study found that both singing and listening to choral music reduces the level of stress hormones and increases immune function.

A multinational collaboration to study the connection between singing and health was established in 2009, called Advancing Interdisciplinary Research in Singing (AIRS). Singing provides physical, cognitive, and emotional benefits to participants. When they step on stage, many singers forget their worries and focus solely on the song. Singing is becoming a more widely known method of increasing an individual's overall health and wellness, in turn helping them to battle diseases such as cancer more effectively due to decreased stress, releasing of endorphins, and increased lung capacity.

===== Effect on the brain =====
John Daniel Scott, among others, have cited that "people who sing are more likely to be happy". This is because "singing elevates the levels of neurotransmitters which are associated with pleasure and well being". Humans have a long prehistory of music, especially singing; it is speculated that music was even used as an early form of social bonding. As stated by Savage et al. (2020), Songs were also used to identify a socio-cultural connection between individuals, as songs typically vary. If two people knew the same song, they likely had a connection from previous generations (7), because song is often more memorable. Savage et al. continues by presenting evidence that music or singing may have evolved in humans even before language. Furthermore, Levitin, in his This is Your Brain on Music, argues that "music may be the activity that prepared our pre-human ancestors for speech communication" and that "singing ... might have helped our species to refine motor skills, paving the way for the development of the exquisitely fine muscle control required for vocal ... speech" (260). On the other hand, he cites Pinker, who "argued that language is an adaptation and music is its Spandrel ... an evolutionary accident piggybacking on language" (248).

Studies have found evidence suggesting the mental, as well as physical, benefits of singing. When conducting a study with 21 members of a choir at three different points over one year, three themes suggested three areas of benefits; the social impact (connectedness with others), personal impact (positive emotions, self-perception, etc.), and functional outcomes (health benefits of being in the choir). Findings showed that a sense of well-being is associated with singing, by uplifting the mood of the participants and releasing endorphins in the brain. Many singers also reported that singing helped them regulate stress and relax, allowing them to deal better with their daily lives. From a social perspective, approval from the audience, and interaction with other choir members in a positive manner is also beneficial.

Singing is beneficial for pregnant mothers. By giving them another medium of communication with their newborns, mothers in one study reported feelings of love and affection when singing to their unborn children. They also reported feeling more relaxed than ever before during their stressful pregnancy. A song can have nostalgic significance by reminding a singer of the past, and momentarily transport them, allowing them to focus on singing and embrace the activity as an escape from their daily lives and problems.

===== Effect on body =====
A recent study by Tenovus Cancer Care found that singing in a choir for just one hour boosts levels of immune proteins in cancer patients and has a positive overall effect on the health of patients. The study explores the possibility that singing could help put patients in the best mental and physical shape to receive the treatment they need, by reducing stress hormones, and increasing quantities of cytokines—proteins of the immune system that can increase the body's ability to fight disease. "Singing gives you physical benefits like breath control and muscle movement and enunciation, as well as the learning benefits of processing information" says a musical director and accompanist in the study. The enunciation and speech benefits tie into the language benefits detailed below.

Some have advocated, as in a 2011 article in the Toronto Star, that everyone sing, even if they are not musically talented, because of its health benefits. Singing lowers blood pressure by releasing pent up emotions, boosting relaxation, and reminding them of happy times. It also allows singers to breathe more easily. Patients with lung disease and chronic pulmonary disease experience relief from their symptoms from singing just two times a week. In addition to breathing related illness, singing also has numerous benefits for stroke victims when it comes to relearning the ability to speak and communicate by singing their thoughts. Singing activates the right side of the brain when the left side cannot function (the left side is the area of the brain responsible for speech), so it is easy to see how singing can be an excellent alternative to speech while the victim heals.

===== Physical benefits =====
1. Works the lungs, tones up the intercostals and diaphragm
2. Improves sleep
3. Benefits cardio function by improving aerobic capacity
4. Relaxes overall muscle tension
5. Improves posture
6. Opens up sinuses and respiratory tubes
7. With training, it could help decrease snoring
8. Boosts immune system
9. Helps patients manage pain
10. Helps improve physical balance in people affected by illnesses such as Parkinson's disease =====

==== Psychological benefits ====
1. Reduces cortisol and stress
2. Reduces blood pressure
3. Releases endorphins
4. Improves mood through release of dopamine and serotonin
5. Eases anxiety of upcoming challenges =====

==== Other concepts ====
Including:

- the effectiveness of music in healthcare and therapeutic settings
- music-specific disorders
- musicians' physical and mental health and well-being
- music performance anxiety (MPA, or stage fright)
- motivation, burnout, and depression among musicians
- noise-induced hearing loss among musicians
- Sleep onset and maintenance insomnia

== See also ==
- Cognitive musicology
- Cognitive neuroscience of music
- Performance science
- Psychoacoustics
- Psychoanalysis and music
- Music and emotion
- Music-specific disorders
- Music therapy
