= Nuzzo =

Nuzzo is an Italian surname. Notable people with the surname include:

- John Ken Nuzzo (born 1966), Japanese-born Italian opera singer
- Letizia Nuzzo (born 1976), Italian synchronized swimmer
- Madre Teresa Nuzzo (1851–1923), Maltese Roman Catholic nun
- Raffaele Nuzzo (born 1973), Italian footballer
- Ralph Nuzzo (born 1954), American chemist
- Regina Nuzzo, American statistician
