= The Organized Mind =

2014 book by Daniel J. Levitin

The Organized Mind: Thinking Straight in the Age of Information Overload
- Author: Daniel J. Levitin
- Cover artist: Pete Garceau
- Language: English
- Subject: Business, Psychology, Cognitive Neuroscience, Technology, Leadership
- Publisher: Dutton Penguin
- Publication date: August 19, 2014
- Media type: book
- Pages: 512
- ISBN: 978-0525954187
- OCLC: 861478878
- Dewey Decimal: 53.4/2
- LC Class: BF323.D5L49 2014
- Preceded by: The World in Six Songs
- Followed by: A Field Guide to Lies: Critical Thinking in the Information Age

The Organized Mind: Thinking Straight in the Age of Information Overload is a bestselling popular science book written by the McGill University neuroscientist Daniel J. Levitin, PhD, and first published by Dutton Penguin in the United States and Canada in 2014. It is Levitin's 3rd consecutive best-seller, debuting at #2 on the New York Times Best Seller List, #1 on the Canadian best-seller lists, #1 on Amazon, and #5 on The London Times bestseller list.

In The Organized Mind, Levitin demonstrates how the Information Age is drowning us with an unprecedented deluge of data, and uses the latest brain science to explain how the brain can organize this flood of information. The book is divided in three parts. The first part focuses on attention. Levitin argues that attention is the most essential mental resource for any organism and describes how the brain's attentional system works: it determines which aspects of the environment an individual will deal with, and what gets passed through to that individual's conscious awareness. The attentional awareness system is the reason one can safely drive or walk to work without noticing most of the buildings or cars one passes by.

Additionally, Levitin states that the phrase "paying attention" is scientifically true. Multitasking comes at an actual metabolic cost: switching back and forth between tasks burns a lot more oxygenated glucose (the fuel the brain runs on) than focusing on one task does, and can lead quickly to mental exhaustion. The second and third parts of the book show how readers can use their attentional and memory systems for better organization, from the classroom to the boardroom, from home lives to interactions with friends, doctors, and business associates.
