= MoodLogic =

MoodLogic was a software company founded in 1998 by Tom Sulzer, Christian Pirkner, Elion Chin and Andreas Weigend, and was one of the first online music recommendation systems. The company obtained ratings on over 1 million songs by over 50,000 distinct listeners as part of its proprietary method for modeling user preference space.

== Software ==
In addition to their web presence, the company created a software application that uses a central database to allow users to collaboratively profile music by mood. Each user has a certain number of "credits" they can use to identify song profiles. Credits could be obtained by either paying for them or profiling songs.

This software allowed the user to generate "mood" based playlists based on the mood of the user. The program could also mix a playlist based on a selected song. This would return a playlist with songs of similar tempo, mood, genre, etc. The software was also capable of organizing a music collection based on a "fingerprint" of the song. Moodlogic would generate this fingerprint of the song, upload it to the server and wait for a response. This process could take anywhere from a few seconds to a few minutes depending on computer power, internet connection speed and server load. Once the corrected tag information had been downloaded, the ID3 tag was updated and written to the file. This meant a user could have a collection of incorrectly tagged mp3's and the software would be able to correctly identify, tag, and even organize the songs into folders based on artist.

== Patents ==
Chief Scientist Rehan Khan and his team filed a number of patents, 2 of which have currently been granted: US Patent 6539395 "Method for creating a database for comparing music" and US Patent 7277766 "Method and system for analyzing digital audio files." The latter patented a system for audio fingerprinting that was fast, compact and robust.

== 2006 buy-out ==
Despite a high-profile launch, and apparently active community, the website was short-lived. The last release of the software was on November 13, 2003, with version 2.7.1. The last official traffic on the forums was in late 2004. Repeated forum posts by users after that time resulted in no response, and inquiries from subscribers ceased to be answered, although the software database seemed to continue operating.

Moodlogic was bought by All Media Guide, the company that runs allmusic.com, in May 2006. It is not yet clear whether All Media intends to resume development and reactivate the community. Prominent employees and consultants to the company included musicologist Dr. Robert Gjerdingen, psychologist Daniel Levitin and record producer/e-music.com co-founder Sandy Pearlman.

== 2008 move to Macrovision ==
The MoodLogic site resolves to Macrovision's site with this message:

"Effective March 3, 2008, Macrovision announces the end of life (EOL) of the Moodlogic music management and recommendation software. Service will be discontinued due to intensive operational and infrastructure resources are required to sustain the application. Macrovision’s efforts in music recommendation will continue through the AMG Data Services Tapestry business-to-business product."

== 2009 renaming to Rovi Corporation ==
On July 15, 2009, Macrovision Solutions Corporation was renamed Rovi Corporation. According to the company's website, "Rovi Corporation is focused on revolutionizing the digital entertainment landscape by delivering solutions that enable consumers to intuitively discover new entertainment from many sources and locations. The company also provides extensive entertainment discovery solutions for television, movies, music and photos to its customers in the consumer electronics, cable and satellite, entertainment and online distribution markets. These solutions, complemented by industry leading entertainment data, create the connections between people and technology, and enable them to discover and manage entertainment in its most enjoyable form.

Rovi holds over 4,000 issued or pending patents and patent applications worldwide [including those by MoodLogic], and is headquartered in Santa Clara, California, with numerous offices across the United States and around the world including Japan, Hong Kong, Luxembourg, and the United Kingdom."
