= Guitar Zero =

Book by Gary Marcus

Guitar Zero: The New Musician and the Science of Learning
- First edition cover
- Author: Gary Marcus
- Language: English
- Genre: Non-fiction
- Publisher: Penguin Books
- Publication date: 2012-01-19
- Publication place: United Kingdom
- Media type: Print, e-book
- Pages: 288
- ISBN: 978-0143122784
- Preceded by: Kluge: The Haphazard Construction of the Human Mind (2008)

Guitar Zero: The New Musician and the Science of Learning is a 2012 popular science book by research psychologist Gary Marcus. It documents the author's process of learning the guitar while discussing aspects of music cognition and the role of critical periods in learning a musical ability. The book was released on January 19, 2012 and published by Penguin Books, and in December 2012 was released as a paperback under the title Guitar Zero: The Science of Becoming Musical at Any Age.

== Reception ==
The book reached 24th on the New York Times Best Seller list for hardcover nonfiction during the week of February 19, 2012. Maria Popova on Brainpickings.org named the book among "The Best Music Books of 2012." In a review for The Wall Street Journal, Norman Doidge wrote ""Guitar Zero" is a refreshing alternation between the nitty-gritty details of learning rock-guitar licks and Mr. Marcus's survey of the relevant scientific literature on learning and the brain."
