= Psychology of music preference =

The psychology of music preference is the study of the psychological factors behind peoples' different music preferences. One study found that after researching through studies from the past 50 years, there are more than 500 functions for music. Music is heard by people daily in many parts of the world, and affects people in various ways from emotional regulation to cognitive development, along with providing a means for self-expression. Music training has been shown to help improve intellectual development and ability, though minimal connection has been found as to how it affects emotion regulation. Numerous studies have been conducted to show that individual personality can have an effect on music preference, though a recent meta-analysis has shown that personality in itself explains little variance in music preferences. These studies are not limited to American culture, as they have been conducted with significant results in countries all over the world, including Japan, Germany, Spain, and Brazil.

== Personality and music preference ==
=== Personality ===
The relationship between musical preference and personality has remained a long-standing topic of contention for researchers due to the variability in results and the low-predictive power that personality has demonstrated on music preferences. A meta-analysis conducted by Schäfer and Mehlorn, (2017) of previous studies trying to determine if experience seeking or any of the Big-Five personality traits predicted musical preferences, revealed that the correlation coefficient between music genre and personality traits possessed a magnitude greater than 0.1 in only 6 out of the 30 studies they reviewed. Openness to experience was found to have the strongest correlation with a preference for three musical styles; however, this correlation was still relatively minor. The vast majority of the correlation coefficients were almost zero.

Recent research has used data from music streaming sites instead of self-reported data to show that music genres and the user's listening habits can be used to predict the Big Five personality traits. In a study conducted in 2020, researchers analyzed data from Spotify users and mapped the Big Five personality traits to different genres, moods, and derived metrics such as the number of playlists, diversity in song choice, and repetition of listening habits. Results showed an increase in correlation. Openness had a positive correlation with atmospheric, reggae, and folk music, while conscientiousness had a negative correlation with rock and "Energizing" songs such as "Happy" by Pharrell Williams. In terms of derived metrics, emotional stability had a negative correlation with the listener's skip rate, and openness had a positive correlation with their song discovery rate.

One shortcoming in attempting to establish a predictive relationship between music and personality is likely a result of researchers' tendency to utilize overly homogenized musical genres, failing to account for the variance within musical genres. In a study conducted by Brisson and Bianchi (2021), participants were provided a musical taste inventory and asked to rate their musical genre and sub-genre preferences. For example, electronic music is considered a genre and house music is a sub-genre of electronic music. Results indicated a high degree of variance between participant genre and sub-genre preferences. Enjoying one genre or sub-genre within a broader genre category often failed to consistently predict ratings for related genres and sub-genres with another related genre or sub-genre. Ultimately, only two consistent associations between genres and sub-genres were found, calling into question the reliability of musical genres in research. However, the investigation into this relationship between the influence of personality on music preference remains ongoing despite these genre-based limitations in methodology and past discrepancies in research results.

Various questionnaires have been created to both measure the big five personality traits and musical preferences. The majority of studies attempting to find the correlation between personality and musical preferences administered questionnaires to measure both traits. Others used questionnaires to determine personality traits, and then asked participants to rate musical excerpts on scales such as liking, perceived complexity, emotions felt, and more.

In general, the plasticity traits (openness to experience and extraversion) affect music preference more than the stability traits (agreeableness, neuroticism, and conscientiousness), but each trait is still worth discussing. The personality traits have also been shown to correlate significantly with the emotional effect music has on people. Individual personality differences can help predict the emotional intensity and valence derived from music.

=== Big Five personality traits ===
==== Openness to experience ====
Of all the traits, openness to experience has been shown to have the greatest effect upon genre preference. In general, those rated high in openness to experience prefer music categorized as more complex and novel, such as classical, jazz, and eclecticism, as well as intense and rebellious music. In the study, reflective and complex genres included classical, blues, jazz, and folk music, while intense and rebellious genres included rock, alternative, and heavy metal music. One of the facets of openness to experience is aesthetic appreciation, which is how researchers generally explain the high positive correlation between openness and liking complex music.

One study looking at how personality traits affect music-induced emotion found that, of all the traits, openness to experience was the best predictor of higher emotionally intense reactions to sad and slow music. The most common feelings described from sad music were nostalgia, peacefulness, and wonder, and openness to experience correlated positively with all these feelings. Sad music has also been theorized to allow for greater experience of aesthetic experiences and beauty. Furthermore, individuals scoring high on openness to experience show a preference for diverse musical styles, but do not prefer popular forms of contemporary music, indicating that there are limits to this openness. However, this is only true up to a certain point, as another study looked at music's ability to produce "chills" in the listeners. Although this study found that openness was the best predictor of genre preference, there is no way to use openness to experience to predict whether one will get chills from music or not. Instead, the only measure for that was frequency of listening to music and the self-designated value of the importance of music in one's life.

Another study examined how openness to experience and frequency of listening are related and how they affect music preference. While listening to classical music excerpts, those rated high in openness tended to decrease in liking music faster during repeated listenings, as opposed to those scoring low in openness, who tended to like music more with repeated plays. This suggests novelty in music is an important quality for people high in openness to experience.

One study had people take a personality test before and after listening to classical music with and without written lyrics in front of them. Music both with and without lyrics showed some effect on people's self-reported personality traits, most significantly in terms of openness to experience, which showed a significant increase. Instead of personality affecting music preference, here classical music altered the assessment of their own personalities and made people assess themselves as more open to experience.

Openness to experience is also positively correlated with frequency of intellectual or cognitive use of music, such as analyzing complex musical compositions. Furthermore, individuals more open to experience prefer a greater number of melodic themes in a work of music.

==== Conscientiousness ====
Conscientiousness is negatively correlated with intense and rebellious music, such as rock and heavy metal music. While previous studies have found an association between conscientiousness and emotional regulation, these results do not apply cross-culturally—specifically, researchers did not find this association in Malaysia.

==== Extroversion ====
Extroversion is another good predictor of music genre preference and music use. Energetic extroverts have been linked to preferences in happy, upbeat and conventional music, as well as energetic and rhythmic music, such as rap, hip hop, soul, electronic, and dance music. Additionally, extroverts tend to listen to music more and have background music present in their lives more often. One study compared introverts and extroverts to see who would be more easily distracted by background music with and without lyrics. It was assumed that since extroverts listen to background music more they would be able to tune it out better, but that was proved untrue. No matter how much music people listen to they are still equally affected and distracted by music with lyrics. Another study found that extroverts liked more types of music compared to those who are introverts. It was found that extroverted individuals preferred popular/rock music compared to introverted individuals. Cheerful music with fast tempos, many melodic themes, and vocals are also preferred by extroverts. They are more likely than others to listen to music in the background while doing other activities, such as running, being with friends, or studying. This group also tends to use music to counter the monotony of everyday tasks, such as ironing. In a Turkish study, researchers found that extroverts preferred rock, pop, and rap because these genres facilitated dance and movement.

Another study examined music teachers and music therapists, assuming that people who like and study music would be more extroverted. The results showed that music teachers were definitely higher in extroversion than the general public. Music therapists were also higher on extroversion than introversion, though they scored significantly lower than the teachers. Differences can probably be attributed to teaching being a profession more dependent on extroversion.

==== Agreeableness ====
Agreeable individuals preferred upbeat and conventional music. Agreeableness has also been shown to correlate with more easy-going, relaxed music preferences. Additionally, listeners with high agreeableness displayed an intense emotional response to music which they had never before listened to. Agreeableness is also a good predictor of the emotional intensity experienced from all types of music, both positive and negative. Those scoring high in agreeableness tend to have more intense emotional reactions to all types of music.

==== Neuroticism ====
The more neurotic a person is, the more likely they are to listen to intense and rebellious music (such as alternative, rock and heavy metal). Additionally, neuroticism is positively correlated with emotional use of music. Those who scored high in neuroticism were more likely to report use of music for emotional regulation and experience higher intensity of emotional affect, especially negative emotion.

== Individual and situational influences on musical preferences ==
Situations have been shown to influence individual's preferences for certain types of music. Participants in a study from 1996 provided information about what music they would prefer to listen to in given situations, and indicated that the situation greatly determined their musical preferences. For example, melancholic situations called for sad and moody music, while an arousal situation would call for loud, strong rhythm, invigorating music.

=== Gender ===
Women are more likely than men to respond to music in a more emotional way. Furthermore, women prefer popular music more than men. In a study of personality and gender in preference for exaggerated bass in music, researchers found that men demonstrated more of a preference for bassy music than women. This preference for bassy music is also correlated with antisocial and borderline personalities.

=== Culture ===
Research has shown culture can influence musical preferences. Humans tend to enjoy culturally similar music more than culturally atypical music. In a study conducted by McDermott and Schultz (2016), participants from three regions in Bolivia (La Paz, San Borja, and Santa Maria) and the United States were evaluated for differences in music preferences. The participants from the United States were divided into two groups, with one group possessing at least two years of experience playing an instrument and the other group having a maximum of one year of experience. Participants from Bolivia were divided into groups based on their region, with each region having experienced varying levels of exposure to Western culture. The group of participants from Santa Maria, the Tsimane, were of specific interest due to the substantial differences between their music and Western music in addition to their relative isolation from Western cultural influences. The participants were exposed to traditionally consonant and dissonant sounds from Western music and asked to rate how pleasant they found the sound. Results indicated that Americans, particularly trained musicians, demonstrated the strongest preference for consonances in their music. The groups from La Paz and San Borja also demonstrated some preference for consonance. However, the Tsimane enjoyed both consonant and dissonant chords equally, suggesting that consonance preferences in music are developed through cultural exposure and humans have no innate preferences for certain harmonies or chords.

Culture changes how music is perceived by an individual, and alters affective response to music, particularly in a social context. People feel more connected with one another when listening to culturally typical music than when they listen to culturally atypical music. Previous research has suggested that listening to familiar music might also aid in establishing more significant movement predictability, which can result in more movement synchronicity between individuals, further amplifying feelings of group connection and enjoyment of music. Culture also affects a person's ability to remember music. A study on cross-cultural music memory was conducted by Demorest and Morrison (2016). In the study, Western participants were played six musical excerpts. Three of the excerpts were from Turkish classical music, and the other three were from Western classical music. The music was presented in three different musical contexts (original, monophonic and isochronous).Once all of the excerpts were played, participants received a memory test. The memory test results indicate that participant memory was consistently better at recalling in-cultural music than unfamiliar music.

=== Age ===
Age is a strong factor in determining music preference. There is also evidence that preferences and opinions toward music can change with age. In a Canadian study concerning how adolescent music preferences relate to personality, researchers found that adolescents who preferred heavy music demonstrated low self-esteem, higher levels of discomfort within the family, and tended to feel rejected by others. Adolescents who preferred light music were preoccupied with doing the proper thing, and had difficulty balancing independence with dependence. Adolescents who had eclectic music preferences had less difficulty negotiating adolescence, and were flexible using music according to mood and particular needs at the time.

=== Self views ===
Music preferences can also be influenced by how the individual wants to be perceived, especially in males. Music preferences could be used to make self-directed identity claims. Individuals might select styles of music that reinforce their self-views. For examples, individuals with a conservative self-view preferred conventional styles of music, while individuals with an athletic self view preferred vigorous music. Individuals will unconsciously push perceptions into their environments, music makes this evident. In a 1953 study, Cattell and Anderson began the process of determining musical preference through unconscious traits. While their findings were inconclusive, it created a research basis for later cases. Music is a way similar to diet and physique to outwardly express internal characteristics. Rentfrow and Gosling found through their study of the seven domains that for many, music was placed quite high in the rankings.

=== Mood ===
Active mood is another factor that affects music preference. Generally whether people are in a good or bad mood when they hear music affects how they feel about the type of music and also their emotional response. On that line of thinking, aggression has been shown to improve creativity and emotional intensity derived from music. People with aggressive disorders find music to be a powerful emotional outlet. Depression also impacts perceptions and emotional responses generated from music. Depressed individuals rate their music-associated episodic memories lower than non-depressed individuals. Additionally, the value people put on music and frequency of listening affects their reactions to it. If people listen to a certain type of music and add emotional experience to songs or a genre in general, this increases the likelihood of enjoying the music and being emotionally affected by it. This helps explain why many people might have strong reactions to music their parents listened to frequently when they were children.

=== Movement ===
Research suggests that body movement may play a role in determining musical tastes. Body movement can create either positive or negative feelings towards music depending on if the movement is associated with a positive or negative affective state. A study conducted by Weigelt and Walther (2011) demonstrated that performing a positive physical movement while listening to a song led to an increased preference rating for that song compared to a negative physical movement. Movements associated with smiling muscles (both positive or negative) were found to have the largest effect on musical preference.

=== Productiveness ===
If someone is listening to music with the ultimate goal of completing a task, their musical preference is greatly increased. The more a genre of music increases one's productiveness, the more the individual will gravitate toward that genre to complete future tasks.

In turn, music can increase focus in some. It can help the brain interpret information and understand new things more easily. Music can engage the brain in many different ways, such as increasing attention and concentration.

According to a 2017 study, soft, fast music was concluded to have a positive effect on productiveness. Songs with lyrics are potentially more distracting than instrumental melodies and music with other modes or tempos could possibly evoke obstructive emotions for learning. Music can improve one's mood, create a positive mindset, reduce stress etc., this can directly correlate to learning improvements.

=== Season of the year ===
Season of the year can also affect preferences. After reflecting upon fall or winter seasons, participants preferred reflective and complex music, whereas after reflecting upon summer or spring, participants preferred energetic and rhythmic music. In the same study, it was found that meaningful songs were preferred in the colder seasons (fall and winter) whereas dance songs are preferred in the warmer (spring and summer) seasons. However, "pop" music seems to have a universal appeal, despite the season.

=== Familiarity ===
Familiarity and complexity both have interesting effects on musical preferences. As seen in other types of artistic media, an inverted U relationship is apparent when relating subjective complexity on liking music excerpts. Individuals like complexity to a certain degree, then begin to dislike the music when complexity gets too high. Furthermore, there is a clear positive monotonic relationship between familiarity and liking of music.

== See also ==
- Big Five personality traits
- Culture in music cognition
- Music psychology
