= Gary Marcus =

American cognitive scientist (born 1970)

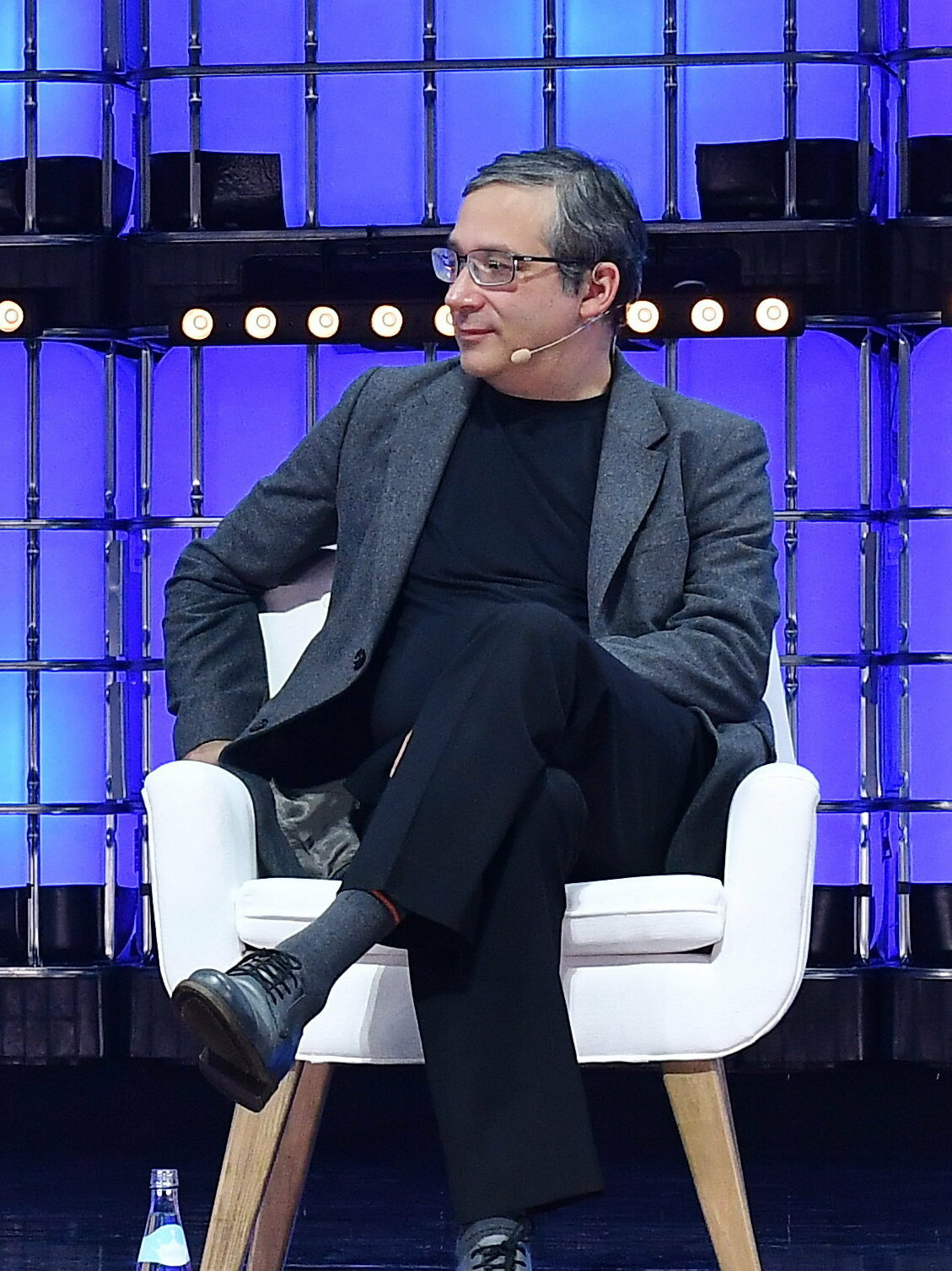
- Marcus in 2022
- Born: Gary Fred Marcus; 1970 (age 55–56); Baltimore, Maryland, US
- Education: Center for Talented Youth
- Alma mater: Hampshire College (BS); Massachusetts Institute of Technology (MS, PhD)
- Scientific career
- Fields: Cognitive psychology, artificial intelligence
- Workplaces: New York University
- Thesis: On rules and exceptions : an investigation of inflectional morphology (1993)
- Doctoral advisor: Steven Pinker
- Website: garymarcus.com

Gary Fred Marcus (born 1970) is an American psychologist, cognitive scientist, and author, known for his research on the intersection of cognitive psychology, neuroscience, and artificial intelligence (AI).

Marcus is professor emeritus of psychology and neural science at New York University. In 2014 he founded Geometric Intelligence, a machine learning company later acquired by Uber.

His books include The Algebraic Mind, Kluge, The Birth of the Mind, and the New York Times Bestseller Guitar Zero.

== Early life and education ==
Marcus was born into a family in Baltimore, Maryland. He developed an early fascination with artificial intelligence and began coding at a young age.

Marcus majored in cognitive science at Hampshire College. He continued on to graduate school at the Massachusetts Institute of Technology (MIT), where he conducted research on negative evidence in language acquisition and regularization (and over-regularization) in children's acquisition of grammatical morphology.

During his PhD studies at MIT, he was mentored by Steven Pinker.

== Career ==
In 2015 Marcus co-founded a machine-learning startup, Geometric Intelligence. When Geometric Intelligence was acquired by Uber in December 2016, he became the director of Uber's AI efforts, but left the company in March 2017.

In 2019 Marcus launched a new startup, Robust.AI, with Rodney Brooks, iRobot co-founder and co-inventor of the Roomba. Robust.AI aims to build an "off-the-shelf" machine-learning platform for adoption in autonomous robots, similar to the way video-game engines can be adopted by third-party game developers.

== Research ==
Marcus's early work focused on why children produce over-regularizations, such as "breaked" and "goed", as a test case for the nature of mental rules.

In his first book, The Algebraic Mind (2001), Marcus challenged the idea that the mind might consist of largely undifferentiated neural networks. He argued that understanding the mind would require integrating connectionism with classical ideas about symbol-manipulation.

Marcus's book, Guitar Zero (2012), explores the process of taking up a musical instrument as an adult.

Marcus edited The Norton Psychology Reader (2005), including selections by cognitive scientists on modern science of the human mind.

With Jeremy Freeman he co-edited The Future of the Brain: Essays by the World's Leading Neuroscientists (2014).

=== Language and mind ===
Marcus belongs to the school of thought of psychological nativism. One of his books, The Birth of the Mind (2004), describes from a nativist perspective the ways that genes can influence cognitive development, and aims to reconcile nativism with common anti-nativist arguments advanced by other academics. He discusses how a small number of genes account for the intricate human brain, common false impressions of genes, and the problems these false impressions may cause for the future of genetic engineering.

In a review, Mameli and Papineau argue that the theory expounded in the book is "more sophisticated than any version of nativism on the market", but that in attempting to rebut anti-nativist arguments, Marcus "ends up reconfiguring the nativist position out of existence", prompting Mameli and Papineau to conclude that the nativist-anti-nativist framing should "be abandoned".

=== Artificial intelligence ===
Marcus is a critic of the "hype" surrounding artificial intelligence. He has called for regulation of AI, increased AI literacy among the public, and "well-funded public thinktanks" to consider potential AI risks. He has also argued that AI is currently being deployed prematurely, particularly in situations that involve a risk of real-world harm resulting from bias, as with facial recognition or résumé parsing, since current deep-learning techniques are not amenable to formal verification for correctness.

Marcus has described current large language models as "approximations to [...] language use rather than language understanding". After the release of GPT-5 in 2025 he said "Adding more data to large language models [...] helps them improve only to a degree. Even significantly scaled, they still don’t fully understand the concepts they are exposed to".

On 29 March 2023, Marcus and other researchers signed an open letter calling for a 6-month moratorium on "the training of AI systems more powerful than GPT-4" until proper safeguards can be implemented, primarily citing the short-term risks of "mediocre AI that is unreliable [...] but widely deployed". In 2024 he published his latest book urging public action to regulate generative AI.

== Personal life ==
As of 2012, Marcus was married, and learning to play guitar.

== Bibliography ==
=== Books ===
- Marcus, G. F. (2024). Taming Silicon Valley: How We Can Ensure That AI Works for Us. MIT Press.
- Marcus, G.; Davis, E. (2019). Rebooting AI: Building Artificial Intelligence We Can Trust. Pantheon/Random House.
- Marcus, G.; Freeman, J. (ed.) (2014). The Future of the Brain: Essays by the World's Leading Neuroscientists. Princeton University Press.
- Marcus, G. F. (2012). Guitar Zero: The New Musician and the Science of Learning. The Penguin Press.
- Marcus, G. F. (2008). Kluge: The Haphazard Construction of the Human Mind. Houghton Mifflin.
- Marcus, G. F. (ed.) (2006). The Norton Psychology Reader. W. W. Norton.
- Marcus, G. F. (2004). The Birth of The Mind: How a Tiny Number of Genes Creates the Complexities of Human Thought. Basic Books.
- Marcus, G. F. (2001). The Algebraic Mind: Integrating Connectionism and Cognitive Science. MIT Press.

=== Selected publications ===
- Marcus, Gary, "Artificial Confidence: Even the newest, buzziest systems of artificial general intelligence are stymied by the same old problems", Scientific American, vol. 327, no. 4 (October 2022), pp. 42–45.
- Marcus, Gary, "Am I Human?: Researchers need new ways to distinguish artificial intelligence from the natural kind", Scientific American, vol. 316, no. 3 (March 2017), pp. 58–63. Marcus points out a so far insuperable stumbling block to artificial intelligence: an incapacity for reliable disambiguation. "[V]irtually every sentence [that people generate] is ambiguous, often in multiple ways. Our brain is so good at comprehending language that we do not usually notice." A prominent example is the "pronoun disambiguation problem" ("PDP"): a machine has no way of determining to whom or what a pronoun in a sentence—such as "he", "she" or "it"—refers.
- Marcus, G. F., & Davis, E. (2013). How robust are probabilistic models of higher-level cognition? Psychological Science, 24(12), 2351–2360.
- Marcus, G. F., Fernandes, K. J., & Johnson, S. P. (2007). Infant rule learning facilitated by speech. Psychological Science, 18(5), 387–391.
- Marcus, G. F. (2006). Cognitive architecture and descent with modification. Cognition, 101(2), 443–465.
- Marcus, G. F., & Fisher, S. E. (2003). FOXP2 in focus: what can genes tell us about speech and language? Trends in Cognitive Sciences, 7(6), 257–262.
- Marcus, G. F., Vijayan, S., Bandi Rao, S., & Vishton, P. M. (1999). Rule learning by seven-month-old infants. Science, 283(5398), 77–80.
- Marcus, G. F. (1998). Rethinking eliminative connectionism. Cognitive Psychology, 37(3), 243–282.
- Marcus, G. F., Brinkmann, U., Clahsen, H., Wiese, R., & Pinker, S. (1995). German inflection: The exception that proves the rule. Cognitive Psychology, 29(3), 189–256.
- Marcus, G. F., Pinker, S., Ullman, M., Hollander, M., Rosen, T. J., Xu, F., & Clahsen, H. (1992). Overregularization in language acquisition. Monographs of the Society for Research in Child Development, 57(4), i-178.
