= Quebec Writers' Federation =

Canadian not-for-profit registered charitable organization

Quebec Writers' Federation (QWF)
- Industry: Not-for-profit registered charitable organization
- Founded: 1998 (as Quebec Writers' Federation) Canada
- Headquarters: Westmount (Montreal), Quebec, Canada
- Website: The Quebec Writers’ Federation. Official website

The Quebec Writers’ Federation (QWF) is a not-for-profit registered charitable organization representing and serving the English-language literary community in the province of Quebec, Canada.

QWF is a literary arts presenter, provides professional development to established and emerging writers, runs community literary education programs, administers the Quebec Writers’ Federation Awards annually, and publishes the not-for-profit literary journal carte blanche.

The QWF also curates the QWF Literary Database of Quebec English-language authors, a searchable online compendium that represents the physical QWF collection of over 2,180 books by Quebec English-language authors, housed at the Atwater Library and Computer Centre.

The QWF is based in Westmount (Montreal), Canada.

== History ==
QWF was founded in 1998 from two predecessor organizations, the Quebec Society for the Promotion of English-Language Literature (QSPELL) and the Federation of English-language Writers of Quebec (FEWQ).

In 2013, the QWF celebrated its fifteenth anniversary, with a gala at the Virgin Mobile Corona Theatre.

== See also ==
- List of writers from Quebec
