= This Is Your Brain on Music =

2008 non-fiction book by Daniel Levitin

This Is Your Brain on Music: The Science of a Human Obsession
- Author: Daniel J. Levitin
- Language: English
- Subject: music theory, cognitive psychology, neuroscience, popular music, memoir
- Publisher: Dutton Penguin
- Publication date: 2006
- Publication place: United States and Canada
- English publication date: August 2008
- Media type: Print (paperback)
- Pages: 314
- ISBN: 0-525-94969-0
- OCLC: 196370454
- Dewey Decimal: 781.11
- LC Class: ML3830
- Followed by: The World in Six Songs

This Is Your Brain on Music: The Science of a Human Obsession is a popular science book written by the McGill University neuroscientist Daniel J. Levitin, and first published by Dutton Penguin in the U.S. and Canada in 2006, and updated and released in paperback by Plume/Penguin in 2007. It has been translated into 18 languages and spent more than a year on The New York Times, The Globe and Mail, and other bestseller lists, and sold more than one million copies.

== Overview ==
The aim of This Is Your Brain on Music was to make recent findings in neuroscience of music accessible to the educated layperson. Characteristics and theoretical parameters of music are explained alongside scientific findings about how the brain interprets and processes these characteristics. The neuroanatomy of musical expectation, emotion, listening and performance is discussed.

This Is Your Brain on Music describes the components of music, such as timbre, rhythm, pitch, and harmony and ties them to neuroanatomy, neurochemistry, cognitive psychology, and evolution, while also making these topics accessible to nonexpert readers by avoiding the use of scientific jargon. One particular focus of the book is on cognitive models of categorization and expectation, and how music exploits these cognitive processes. The book challenges Steven Pinker's "auditory cheesecake" assertion that music was an incidental by-product of evolution, arguing instead that music served as an indicator of cognitive, emotional and physical health, and was evolutionarily advantageous as a force that led to social bonding and increased fitness, citing the arguments of Charles Darwin, Geoffrey Miller and others.

This Is Your Brain on Music was a finalist for the Los Angeles Times Book Award in 2006–2007 for best in the Science and Engineering category, and a Quill Award for best debut author of 2006–2007. It was named one of the best books of the year by The Globe and Mail, The Independent and The Guardian. A long list of prominent scientists and musicians have praised it, including Oliver Sacks, Francis Crick, Brian Greene, David Byrne, George Martin, Yoko Ono, Neil Peart, Victor Wooten, Pete Townshend and Keith Lockhart, and it has been adopted for course use in both science and literature classes at dozens of universities including MIT, Dartmouth College, UC Berkeley, Stanford, Kenyon College, the University of Wisconsin. Two documentary films were based on the book: The Musical Brain (2009) featuring Levitin as host, along with appearances by Sting, Michael Bublé, Feist, and former Fugees leader Wyclef Jean; and The Music Instinct (2009) with Levitin and Bobby McFerrin as co-hosts, with appearances by Yo Yo Ma, Jarvis Cocker, Daniel Barenboim, Oliver Sacks and others. In 2009, Harvard University announced This Is Your Brain on Music would be required reading in its Freshman Core Program in General Education. In 2011–2012, the Physics Department at the California Institute of Technology adopted it as a textbook.

== Current editions ==
=== English ===
- This Is Your Brain on Music: The Science of a Human Obsession. New York: Plume (Penguin), 2007, paperback, ISBN 978-0-452-28852-2.
- This Is Your Brain on Music: Understanding a Human Obsession. London: Grove/Atlantic, 2007, hardcover, ISBN 978-1-84354-715-0
- This Is Your Brain on Music: Understanding a Human Obsession. London: Grove/Atlantic, 2008, paperback, ISBN 978-1-84354-716-7

=== Other languages ===
- Ons muzikale brein. Altas Contact, Amsterdam, 2013, ISBN 9789045024561, vertaling Robert Vernooy, paperback 320 p.
- De la note au cerveau. Les Éditions de l'Homme/Sogides, Montreal, Quebec, Canada, 2010, ISBN 978-2-7619-2679-9
- De la note au cerveau. France: Editions Heloise d'Ormesson, 2010. ISBN 2-35087-129-0
- Der Musik-Instinkt: Die Wissenschaft einer menschlichen Leidenschaft. Heidelberg, Germany: Spektrum, 2009, ISBN 978-3-8274-2078-7
- Fatti di musica: La scienza di un'ossessione umana. 2008, Torino, Italy: Codice, 2008, paperback, ISBN 978-88-7578-098-2
- Musiikki ja aivot: Ihmisen erään pakkomielteen tiedettä. (Translated into Finnish by Timo Paukku.) Helsinki: Terra Cognita 2010. ISBN 978-952-5697-22-3
- This Is Your Brain on Music. (Portuguese). Brazil: Distribuidora Record, 2009.
- This Is Your Brain on Music. Croatia: Vukovic & Runjic.
- This Is Your Brain on Music. Greece: Psihopolis, due 2010.
- This Is Your Brain on Music. Japan: Hakuyosha Publishing, due 2010.
- This Is Your Brain on Music. Romania: SC Humanitas, due 2010.
- This Is Your Brain on Music. Turkey: Pegasus Yayincilik, 2010.
- Tu cerebro y la música. Spain: RBA Libros. ISBN 978-84-9867-336-4, 2008.
- Uma Paixão Humana: O seu Cérebro e a Música. Lisbon, Portugal: EditorialBizâncio, 2007, paperback, ISBN 978-972-53-0363-4
- 뇌의 왈츠 - 세상에서 가장 아름다운 강박 (This Is Your Brain on Music.) Korea: Mati. ISBN 978-89-92053-16-7, 2008.
- Ова е вашиотмозок за музика (This Is Your Brain on Music.) Macedonia: Kosta Abras Ad Ohrid, 2009. ISBN 978-9989-843-48-8
