= The World in Six Songs =

2008 book by Daniel J. Levitin

- Author: Daniel J. Levitin
- Language: English
- Subject: music, cognitive neuroscience, anthropology, evolution, memoir
- Publisher: Dutton/Penguin Books
- Publication date: 2008
- Publication place: U.S.A.
- Pages: 368
- ISBN: 978-0452295483
- OCLC: 757065811
- Dewey Decimal: 781/.11
- LC Class: ML3838.L48 2008
- Preceded by: This Is Your Brain on Music
- Followed by: The Organized Mind

The World in Six Songs: How the Musical Brain Created Human Nature is a popular science book written by the McGill University neuroscientist Daniel J. Levitin, first published by Dutton Penguin in the U.S. and Canada in 2008. It was updated and released in paperback by Plume in 2009 and translated into six languages. Levitin's second New York Times bestseller, following the publication of This Is Your Brain on Music, received praise from a wide variety of readers including Sir George Martin, Sting, Elizabeth Gilbert, and Adam Gopnik. The Los Angeles Times called it "masterful". The New York Times wrote: "A lively, ambitious new book whose combined elements can induce feelings of enlightenment and euphoria. Will leave you awestruck." The Times wrote "Levitin is such an enthusiastic anthropologist, such an exuberant song and dance man, such a natural-born associative thinker, that you gotta love the guy." It was named one of the best books of 2008 by the Boston Herald and by Seed Magazine.

The World in Six Songs combines science and art to reveal how music shaped humanity across cultures and throughout history. This book leans more heavily on anthropology and evolutionary biology than did This Is Your Brain On Music, which skewed more toward findings in psychoacoustics and neuroscience.

Levitin identifies six fundamental song functions or types (friendship, joy, comfort, religion, knowledge, and love) then shows how each in its own way has enabled the social bonding necessary for human culture and society to evolve. He shows, in effect, how these six song types function in our brains to preserve the emotional and literal history of our lives and species. Levitin illuminates, through songs, how music has been instrumental in the evolution of language, thought and culture. Musical examples ranging from Beethoven to The Beatles, Busta Rhymes to Bach, are used to support the book's propositions.

The book includes scientific research from the author's music cognition lab at McGill University, his experiences in the music business, and interviews with musicians such as Sting and David Byrne as well as conductors, anthropologists, and evolutionary biologists. It is a work of literary nonfiction.
