= Levitin effect =

Phenomenon regarding memory of musical keys

The Levitin effect is a phenomenon whereby people, even those without musical training, tend to remember songs in the correct key. The finding stands in contrast to the large body of laboratory literature suggesting that such details of perceptual experience are lost during the process of memory encoding, so that people would remember melodies with relative pitch, rather than absolute pitch.

The effect was first documented by Daniel J. Levitin in 1994 and was regarded as a significant result in cognitive psychology. In 2012, the effect was replicated for the first time. There are theories as to the possible development of this effect and a strong differentiation between a person's ability to distinguish relative pitch versus absolute pitch. Cognitive disorders can affect a person's ability to experience the Levitin effect.

== Scientific studies ==
Levitin's original study consisted of 46 volunteer students from Stanford University. Upon arrival, the students filled out a background questionnaire and selected two songs from 56 previously chosen CDs. Volunteers then attempted to sing a part of their songs. The study's results showed that 40% of the participants could sing a correct pitch in at least one of their songs. 12% hit the right pitch on both trials, and 44% hit the pitch within two semitones.

The second study was conducted in 2012 and completed in six European labs. This study was a competitive replication of Levitin's original study. This showed that 25% of participants could sing the correct pitch in at least one of their songs; 4% sang the correct pitches in both songs. These studies demonstrate that people can typically remember songs in a way that is similar to how they heard them, even without a reference to the music. When compared to Levitin's original study, the replication showed a lower trend in the data, indicating that a smaller percentage of the population was able to recall the relative pitch.

More data is needed to understand how much of the population can accurately recall the relative pitch of a selected song.

== Possible explanations ==
Levitin offers possible explanations for this phenomenon, by describing how even young children have this ability to a certain degree, so this ability to recognize musical patterns could be located in the cerebellum of the brain. The cerebellum helps to control balance and coordination, but when listening to music, the cerebellum helps the body interpret rhythm. Researchers Lawrence Parsons and Peter T. Fox of University of Texas Health Science Center ran brain scans on conductors, and saw an increase of blood flow to the cerebellum when they were following along to sheet music and listening to it at the same time. The scans showed that as the rhythm changed, the amount of blood flow in the cerebellum changed as well.

There are several theories that attempt to explain this occurrence. One theory states that early humans needed to synchronize their steps to avoid making more noise than necessary while hunting. Another theory suggests that those early humans who were able to distinguish rudimentary rhythms may have been more able to hear and interpret different footsteps, making them more attuned to the environment around them and giving them better survival instincts.

== Absolute vs. relative pitch ==
Absolute pitch, also referred to as perfect pitch, is the ability to correctly identify or recreate a sound or pitch without needing a reference. This ability is rare among humans, but there has been shown to be a correlation between those who were exposed to music while they were babies and those who possess this ability. There is also evidence that this can be genetic, meaning that those who have a family member with absolute pitch are more likely to have it as well.

Musicians generally consider perfect pitch helpful, but many successful musicians possess only relative pitch, which is the ability to identify changes in pitch and timbre in music. Relative pitch is far more common in the population, and unlike perfect pitch, it is not believed to be based on any musical training or exposure. In fact, this was what Levitin was attempting to show in his experiments. While most humans have an innate ability to distinguish musical intervals, musicians of many backgrounds find extensive ear training, to formalize their understanding, essential. While most of the human population has some general understanding of pitch, there exist people who are truly "tone-deaf." This inability to process and understand changes in pitch, known as amusia, can be congenital or acquired.

== Cognitive disorders ==
There are certain disorders in the brain that can prevent someone from having the ability to perceive relative pitch. These disorders can be congenital or developed. Amusia is a term used to describe someone who has difficulty differentiating pitch or identifying music. Congenital amusia is often referred to as being tone-deaf. Those with congenital amusia can process speech, differences in people's voices, and environmental sounds, but most cannot identify patterns in music.

There are varying degrees of amusia. Some people can distinguish different songs and "hear" the music while others have absolutely no understanding of music. Amusia can also be developed through traumatic brain injuries or lesions and tumours on the brain. Sometimes this condition is reversible, but there is not a way to know if the person will be able to distinguish pitches again. The reason for this condition is not fully known, but research and brain scans indicate that it may be caused by dysfunctions in the frontal cortex of the brain.
