= Regina Nuzzo =

Science writer

Academic background
- Education: University of South Florida (BS); Stanford University (PhD)
- Thesis: Stochastic models for lipid biochemistry (2002)
- Doctoral advisor: Richard A. Olshen

Academic work
- Discipline: Statistician
- Institutions: Gallaudet University
- Website: www.reginanuzzo.com

Regina Nuzzo is a professor of statistics at Gallaudet University in Washington D.C., a liberal arts school for deaf and hard-of-hearing students. She also writes articles about the importance of statistical and science communication and is an advocate for people with disabilities in the science and technology field.

== Education ==
Nuzzo graduated from the University of South Florida with a bachelor's degree in industrial engineering and went on to obtain her Ph.D in statistics from Stanford University in 2004, supervised by Richard A. Olshen. Her dissertation was written on the usage of stochastic models in biochemistry.

Nuzzo also graduated from the University of California Santa Cruz's science writing program.

== Career ==
Nuzzo has been a faculty member at Gallaudet University since 2006. She has written multiple articles for publication in major magazines, including WIRED magazine, the New York Times, Los Angeles Times, as well as Reader's Digest. In addition to teaching, she gives seminars about statistics, which have been hosted at the University of Washington, the University of Maryland, and Harvard University.

In 2019, Nuzzo was appointed the Senior Advisor for Statistics Communication and Media Innovation for the American Statistical Association.

== Awards ==
In 2014, Nuzzo was awarded the Excellence in Statistical Reporting Award (ESRA) by the American Statistical Association for her article in Nature about statistical p-values.

== Notable popular press work ==
- "Standing Strong", Cancer Today - 2013
- "The Future of Election Forecasting", Scientific American - 2014
- "Regrown nerves boost bionic ears", Nature - 2014
- "How scientists fool themselves - and how they can stop", Nature - 2015
- "What Happens When Scientists Experiment on Themselves?" - Reader's Digest - 2016
- "When courtroom science goes wrong - and how stats can fix it", Knowable Magazine - 2018

== Notable academic journal articles ==
- "Intracellular reduction of selenite into glutathione peroxidase... " - US National Library of Medicine - 2000
- "Vestibular Dysfunction in DFNB1 Deafness" - US National Library of Medicine - 2011
