= Definition of music =

A definition of music endeavors to give an accurate and concise explanation of music's basic attributes or essential nature and it involves a process of defining what is meant by the term music. Many authorities have suggested definitions, but defining music turns out to be more difficult than might first be imagined, and there is ongoing debate. A number of explanations start with the notion of music as organized sound, but they also highlight that this is perhaps too broad a definition and cite examples of organized sound that are not defined as music, such as human speech and sounds found in both natural and industrial environments. The problem of defining music is further complicated by the influence of culture in music cognition.

The Concise Oxford Dictionary defines music as "the art of combining vocal or instrumental sounds (or both) to produce beauty of form, harmony, and expression of emotion". However, some music genres, such as noise music and musique concrète, challenge these ideas by using sounds not widely considered as musical, beautiful or harmonious, like randomly produced electronic distortion, feedback, static, cacophony, and sounds produced using compositional processes which utilize indeterminacy.

An often-cited example of the dilemma in defining music is the work 4′33″ (1952) by the American composer John Cage (1912–1992). The written score has three movements and directs the performer(s) to appear on stage, indicated by gesture or other means when the piece begins, then make no sound throughout the duration of the piece, marking sections and the end by gesture. The audience hears only whatever ambient sounds may occur in the room. Some argue that 4′33″ is not music because, among other reasons, it contains no sounds that are conventionally considered "musical" and the composer and performer(s) exert no control over the organization of the sounds heard. Others argue it is music because the conventional definitions of musical sounds are unnecessarily and arbitrarily limited, and control over the organization of the sounds is achieved by the composer and performer(s) through their gestures that divide what is heard into specific sections and a comprehensible form.

== Concepts of music ==
Because of differing fundamental concepts of music, the languages of many cultures do not contain a word that can be accurately translated as "music" as that word is generally understood by Western cultures. Inuit and most North American Indian languages do not have a general term for music. Among the Aztecs, the ancient Mexican theory of rhetoric, poetry, dance, and instrumental music used the Nahuatl term In xochitl-in kwikatl to refer to a complex mix of music and other poetic verbal and non-verbal elements, and reserved the word Kwikakayotl (or cuicacayotl) only for the sung expressions. There is no term for music in Nigerian languages Tiv, Yoruba, Igbo, Efik, Birom, Hausa, Idoma, Eggon or Jarawa. Many other languages have terms which only partly cover what Western culture typically means by the term music. The Mapuche of Argentina do not have a word for music, but they do have words for instrumental versus improvised forms (kantun), European and non-Mapuche music (kantun winka), ceremonial songs (öl), and tayil.

While some languages in West Africa have no term for music, some West African languages accept the general concepts of music. Musiqi is the Persian word for the science and art of music, muzik being the sound and performance of music, though some things European-influenced listeners would include, such as religious chanting, are excluded.

== Music vs. noise ==
Ben Watson points out that Ludwig van Beethoven's Große Fuge (1825) "sounded like noise" to his audience at the time. Indeed, Beethoven's publishers persuaded him to remove it from its original setting as the last movement of a string quartet. He did so, replacing it with a sparkling Allegro. They subsequently published it separately. Musicologist Jean-Jacques Nattiez considers the difference between noise and music nebulous, explaining that "The border between music and noise is always culturally defined—which implies that, even within a single society, this border does not always pass through the same place; in short, there is rarely a consensus ... By all accounts there is no single and intercultural universal concept defining what music might be".

New York punk band The Mad had a song which states "I hate music, we love noise."

== Definitions ==
=== Organized sound ===
An often-cited definition of music is that it is "organized sound", a term originally coined by modernist composer Edgard Varèse in reference to his own musical aesthetic. Varèse's concept of music as "organized sound" fits into his vision of "sound as living matter" and of "musical space as open rather than bounded". He conceived the elements of his music in terms of "sound-masses", likening their organization to the natural phenomenon of crystallization. Varèse thought that "to stubbornly conditioned ears, anything new in music has always been called noise", and he posed the question, "what is music but organized noises?"

The fifteenth edition of the Encyclopædia Britannica states that "while there are no sounds that can be described as inherently unmusical, musicians in each culture have tended to restrict the range of sounds they will admit." A human organizing element is often felt to be implicit in music (sounds produced by non-human agents, such as waterfalls or birds, are often described as "musical", but perhaps less often as "music"). The composer R. Murray states that the sound of classical music "has decays; it is granular; it has attacks; it fluctuates, swollen with impurities—and all this creates a musicality that comes before any 'cultural' musicality." However, in the view of semiologist Jean-Jacques Nattiez, "just as music is whatever people choose to recognize as such, noise is whatever is recognized as disturbing, unpleasant, or both". (See "music as social construct" below.)

==== Language ====
Levi R. Bryant defines music not as a language, but as a mark-based, problem-solving method, comparable to mathematics.

=== Musical universals ===
Most definitions of music include a reference to sound and a list of universals of music can be generated by stating the elements (or aspects) of sound: pitch, timbre, loudness, duration, spatial location and texture. However, in terms more specifically relating to music, following Wittgenstein, cognitive psychologist Eleanor Rosch proposes that categories are not clean cut but that something may be more or less a member of a category. As such the search for musical universals would fail and would not provide one with a valid definition. This is primarily because other cultures have different understandings in relation to the sounds that English-language writers refer to as music.

=== Social construct ===
Many people do, however, share a general idea of music. The Websters definition of music is a typical example: "the science or art of ordering tones or sounds in succession, in combination, and in temporal relationships to produce a composition having unity and continuity" (Webster's Collegiate Dictionary, online edition).

=== Subjective experience ===
This approach to the definition focuses not on the construction but on the experience of music. An extreme statement of the position has been articulated by the Italian composer Luciano Berio: "Music is everything that one listens to with the intention of listening to music". This approach permits the boundary between music and noise to change over time as the conventions of musical interpretation evolve within a culture, to be different in different cultures at any given moment, and to vary from person to person according to their experience and proclivities. It is further consistent with the subjective reality that even what would commonly be considered music is experienced as non-music if the mind is concentrating on other matters and thus not perceiving the sound's essence as music.

== Specific definitions ==
=== Clifton ===
In his 1983 book, Music as Heard, which sets out from the phenomenological position of Husserl, Merleau-Ponty, and Ricœur, Thomas Clifton defines music as "an ordered arrangement of sounds and silences whose meaning is presentative rather than denotative ... This definition distinguishes music, as an end in itself, from compositional technique, and from sounds as purely physical objects." More precisely, "music is the actualization of the possibility of any sound whatever to present to some human being a meaning which he experiences with his body—that is to say, with his mind, his feelings, his senses, his will, and his metabolism". It is therefore "a certain reciprocal relation established between a person, his behavior, and a sounding object".

Clifton accordingly differentiates music from non-music on the basis of the human behavior involved, rather than on either the nature of compositional technique or of sounds as purely physical objects. Consequently, the distinction becomes a question of what is meant by musical behavior: "a musically behaving person is one whose very being is absorbed in the significance of the sounds being experienced." However, "It is not altogether accurate to say that this person is listening to the sounds. First, the person is doing more than listening: he is perceiving, interpreting, judging, and feeling. Second, the preposition 'to' puts too much stress on the sounds as such. Thus, the musically behaving person experiences musical significance by means of, or through, the sounds".

In this framework, Clifton finds that there are two things that separate music from non-music: (1) musical meaning is presentative, and (2) music and non-music are distinguished in the idea of personal involvement. "It is the notion of personal involvement which lends significance to the word ordered in this definition of music". This is not to be understood, however, as a sanctification of extreme relativism, since "it is precisely the 'subjective' aspect of experience which lured many writers earlier in this century down the path of sheer opinion-mongering. Later on this trend was reversed by a renewed interest in 'objective,' scientific, or otherwise non-introspective musical analysis. But we have good reason to believe that a musical experience is not a purely private thing, like seeing pink elephants, and that reporting about such an experience need not be subjective in the sense of it being a mere matter of opinion".

Clifton's task, then, is to describe musical experience and the objects of this experience which, together, are called "phenomena", and the activity of describing phenomena is called "phenomenology". It is important to stress that this definition of music says nothing about aesthetic standards.

Music is not a fact or a thing in the world, but a meaning constituted by human beings. ... To talk about such experience in a meaningful way demands several things. First, we have to be willing to let the composition speak to us, to let it reveal its own order and significance. ... Second, we have to be willing to question our assumptions about the nature and role of musical materials. ... Last, and perhaps most important, we have to be ready to admit that describing a meaningful experience is itself meaningful.

=== Nattiez ===
"Music, often an art/entertainment, is a total social fact whose definitions vary according to era and culture", according to Jean Molino. It is often contrasted with noise. According to musicologist Jean-Jacques Nattiez: "The border between music and noise is always culturally defined—which implies that, even within a single society, this border does not always pass through the same place; in short, there is rarely a consensus ... By all accounts there is no single and intercultural universal concept defining what music might be". Given the above demonstration that "there is no limit to the number or the genre of variables that might intervene in a definition of the musical", an organization of definitions and elements is necessary.

Nattiez (1990, 17) describes definitions according to a tripartite semiological scheme similar to the following:

Poietic Process			Esthesic Process
Composer (Producer)	→	Sound (Trace)	←	Listener (Receiver)

There are three levels of description, the poietic, the neutral, and the esthesic:

- "By 'poietic' I understand describing the link among the composer's intentions, his creative procedures, his mental schemas, and the result of this collection of strategies; that is, the components that go into the work's material embodiment. Poietic description thus also deals with a quite special form of hearing (Varese called it 'the interior ear'): what the composer hears while imagining the work's sonorous results, or while experimenting at the piano, or with tape."
- "By 'esthesic' I understand not merely the artificially attentive hearing of a musicologist, but the description of perceptive behaviors within a given population of listeners; that is how this or that aspect of sonorous reality is captured by their perceptive strategies".
- The neutral level is that of the physical "trace", (Saussere's sound-image, a sonority, a score), created and interpreted by the esthesic level (which corresponds to a perceptive definition; the perceptive and/or "social" construction definitions below) and the poietic level (which corresponds to a creative, as in compositional, definition; the organizational and social construction definitions below).

Table describing types of definitions of music:

	poietic level (choice of the composer)	neutral level (physical definition)	esthesic level (perceptive judgment)
music	musical sound	sound of the harmonic spectrum	agreeable sound
non-music	noise (nonmusical)	noise (complex sound)	disagreeable noise

Because of this range of definitions, the study of music comes in a wide variety of forms. There is the study of sound and vibration or acoustics, the cognitive study of music, the study of music theory and performance practice or music theory and ethnomusicology and the study of the reception and history of music, generally called musicology.

=== Xenakis ===
Composer Iannis Xenakis in "Towards a Metamusic" (chapter 7 of Formalized Music) defined music in the following way:

1. It is a sort of comportment necessary for whoever thinks it and makes it.
2. It is an individual pleroma, a realization.
3. It is a fixing in sound of imagined virtualities (cosmological, philosophical, ..., arguments)
4. It is normative, that is, unconsciously it is a model for being or for doing by sympathetic drive.
5. It is catalytic: its mere presence permits internal psychic or mental transformations in the same way as the crystal ball of the hypnotist.
6. It is the gratuitous play of a child.
7. It is a mystical (but atheistic) asceticism. Consequently, expressions of sadness, joy, love and dramatic situations are only very limited particular instances.

== See also ==
- Zoomusicology
- Sound art
