= Presentationism =

Philosophical term deriving from the term presentation

Presentationism (from Latin prae-esse, praesens, present) is a philosophical term used in various senses deriving from the general sense of the term presentation. In philosophy, presentationism means the theory that objects are identical with our perceptions of them.

According to G. F. Stout (cf. Manual of Psychology, i. 57), presentations are whatever constituents or our total experience at any moment directly determine the nature of the object as it is perceived or thought of at that moment. In Baldwin's Dictionary of Philosophy and Psychology, vol. ii., a presentation is an object in the special form under which it is cognized at any given moment of perceptual or ideational process. This, the widest definition of the term, due largely to Professor James Ward, thus includes both perceptual and ideational processes. The term has, indeed, been narrowed so as to include ideation, the correlative representation being utilized for ideal presentation, but in general the wider use is preferred.

When the mind is cognizing an object, the object presents itself to the senses or to thought in one of a number of different forms (e.g. a picture is a work of art, a saleable commodity, a representation of a house, etc.). Presentation is thus essentially a cognitive process. Hence the most important use of the term presentationism, which is defined by Ward, in Mind, N.S. (1893), ii. 58, as a doctrine the gist of which is that all the elements of psychical life are primarily and ultimately cognitive elements. This use takes precedence of two others: (1) that of Hamilton, for presentative as opposed to representative theories of knowledge, and (2) that of some later writers who took it as equivalent to phenomenon. Ward traces the doctrine in his sense to David Hume, to whom the mind is a kind of theatre in which perceptions appear and vanish continually (see Green and Grose edition of A Treatise of Human Nature, p. 534). The main problem is as to whether psychic activity is presented or not. Ward holds that it is not presented or presentable save indirectly.
