= Irène Deliège =

Belgian cognitive scientist (1933–2024)

- Born: 15 January 1933; Flanders, Belgium
- Died: 11 May 2024 (aged 91); Brussels, Belgium
- Education: University of Liège
- Known for: Co-Founder and First Permanent Secretary of ESCOM
- Spouse: Célestin Deliège
- Scientific career
- Fields: Music Theory, Music Psychology
- Workplaces: IRCAM, University of Liège
- Doctoral advisor: Prof. Marc Richelle

Irène Deliège (15 January 1933 – 11 May 2024) was a Belgian musician and cognitive scientist. She was born in January 1933 in Flanders, but spent most of her life in French-speaking Brussels and Liège, Belgium. She was noted for her theory of Cue Abstraction, and for her work in establishing the European Society for the Cognitive Sciences of Music. She died on 11 May 2024 in Brussels.

== Biography ==
Irène Deliège was a cognitive scientist, specialising in music cognition. She was born in January 1933 in Flanders, Belgium.

She was educated at [details] and the Royal Conservatory of Brussels from where she obtained a diploma in music. For 25 years, she worked as a classroom music teacher in the Belgian public (state-funded) school system.

Shortly after graduating she began to attend the courses in composition and harmony given by Profressor Andre Souris at the Royal Conservatory of Brussels, and as a result was invited to attend the Summer School for New Music in Darmstadt (Darmstädter Ferienkurse), where she met the Belgian musicologist Célestin Deliège, whom she married in 1954.

In 1979 she returned to study and earned a bachelor's degree in psychology from the Free University of Brussels (Université libre de Bruxelles), graduating in 1984. She was then invited by Professor Marc Richelle, head of the Psychology Department at the University of Liège, to establish a Unit for Research in Psychology of Music, in association with the Royal Conservatory of Brussels and the Centre de Recherche et de la Formation musicales de Wallonie (CRFMW) founded by the composer Henri Pousseur. The unit existed from 1986 until her retirement in 199?

Simultaneously with establishing the unit, she embarked on PhD studies at Liège and was awarded her PhD in 1991. Her dissertation was L'organisation psychologique de l'écoute de la musique. Des marques de sédimentation indice, empreinte dans la représentation mentale de l'oeuvre (The psychological organisation of musical listening).

Deliège died on 11 May 2026, at the age of 91.

== The European Society for the Cognitive Sciences of Music ==
In 1991, she was elected the first permanent secretary of the newly founded European Society for the Cognitive Sciences of Music (ESCOM). This organisation, whose foundation she led, was in part a response to the earlier formation of the North American Society for Music Perception and Cognition (SMPC). In 1989 SMPC collaborated with the Japanese Society of Music Perception and Cognition to host the first International Conference of Music Perception and Cognition (ICMPC), held in Kyoto, Japan. At the second ICMPC, held in Los Angeles in 1992, Irène Deliège proposed that the third conference should be held in Europe, and that a biennial rotation between North America, Europe, and the Far East and Australasia should thereafter be maintained. Her proposals were accepted as the long-term structure for ICMPC, which recently held its 12th conference attended by over 500 delegates. ESCOM has been the European host for four ICMCPs to date (Liège 1994; Keele, UK 2000; Bologna, Italy 2006; Thessaloniki, Greece 2012).

Alongside the ICMPC, Deliège also took a leading role in the stimulation and organisation of European scientific meetings, and the editing of multi-author volumes dedicated to specialist topics within the field of music cognition. 2012 saw the first publication in a new series of Classic European Music Science Monographs, a project to commission and publish English translations of seminal historic European treatises on systematic and scientific musicology from 20th and earlier centuries. Translations are funded from a special "Irène Deliège Translation Fund" endowed to ESCOM in 2010.

In 1997, ESCOM founded a new scholarly journal, Musicæ Scientiæ. Its first editor was Irène Deliège, who held this position, as well as that of general secretary of ESCOM, until 2009. The journal has a unique remit, covering empirical science, artificial intelligence, education, systematic musicology, and philosophy. The publisher Sage took on the journal in 2009, and its impact factor in 2012 was 0.729.

== Scientific contribution ==
Deliège's scientific work involved some of the first, and certainly some of the most influential, attempts to empirically test major predictions of the work of Fred Lerdahl and Ray Jackendoff as laid out in their groundbreaking Generative Theory of Tonal Music (1983). This work involved novel methods for measuring perception of medium- to large-scale structure, up to and including entire works; going substantially beyond most scientific work of the time which concentrated (and, to a large extent does still) on perception of small, disembodied musical fragments. Another important aspect of her work was a courageous exploration of these issues as applied to contemporary classical music, including atonal works, another challenge largely neglected in the wider field. She also made important contributions to the understanding of the development of musical perception through infancy and childhood.

== Bibliography ==
- 1985. Perception des formations élémentaires de la Musique. Voies de recherche de la psychologie cognitive. Analyse Musicale 1, Paris, 20-28.
- 1987. Le Parallélisme, support d'une analyse auditive de la musique : vers un modèle des parcours cognitifs de l'information musicale. Analyse Musicale 6, Paris, 73-79.
- 1987. La Création d'une Unité de Recherche en Psychologie de la Musique à l'Université de Liège. Marsyas 1, Paris, Institut de Pédagogie Musicale.
- 1987. Grouping conditions in Listening to Music. An approach to Lerdahl and Jackendoff's grouping preference rules. Music Perception 4, vol. 4, University of California, 325-359.
- 1989. Mécanismes d'extraction d'indices dans le groupement. Une étude de perception sur la Sequenza VI pour alto solo de Luciano Berio. In Actes du symposium « Composition et Perception musicales », 1987. Université de Genève, Contrechamp 10, 85-104. (Co-auteur A. El Ahmadi.)
- 1989. Approche perceptive d'oeuvres musicales contemporaines. In « La Musique et les Sciences cognitives », (co-edited with S. McAdams). Bruxelles, Pierre Mardaga, coll. Psychologie et Sciences humaines, 305-326.
- 1989. Perceptive approach of contemporary musical forms. In "Music and Cognitive Sciences", (co-edited with S. McAdams). London, Gordon & Breach, Contemporary Music Review, 4, 213-230.
- 1990. Mechanisms of cue extraction in musical groupings. A study of perception on Berio's Sequenza VI for viola solo. Psychology of Music, 18, 1, 18-44. London (co-auteur : A. El Ahmadi)
- 1991. Dictionnaire de psychologie, articles : Psychologie de la musique, Tonie, Ton, Timbre, Tonalité, Tempo. Paris, Presses Universitaires de France.
- 1991. Indices et empreintes dans l'écoute de la musique. In Actes du 1er Congrès Européen d'Analyse Musicale, Colmar (France), Analyse Musicale, numéro spécial, 135-139.
- 1991. La perception de l'opposition Invariant / Variant. Etude expérimentale à partir de l'œuvre de Steve REICH, Four Organs, pour quatre orgues électriques et maracas. Psychologica Belgica, 31, n° 2, 239-263.
- 1992. Paramètres psychologiques et processus de segmentation dans l'écoute de la musique. In Actes du 2e Congrès Européen d'Analyse Musicale, octobre 1991, Trento (Italy), 83-90.
- 1992. De l'activité perceptive à la représentation mentale de l'oeuvre musicale. L'extration d'indices : un parallèle entre les processus de compréhension de textes et l'écoute de la musique. Analyse Musicale, 28, 29-36.
- 1992. Recognition of the Wagnerian Leitmotiv. Experimental Study based on an excerpt from « Das Reingold ». Jahrbuch für Muzikpsychologie, 9, 25-54.
- 1992. Analyse musicale et Perception : points de rencontre. Analyse Musicale, 26, 7-14.
- 1993. Mechanisms of cue extraction in memory for musical time. Proceedings of the 2d symposium « Music and the Cognitive Sciences », Cambridge, septembre 1990. Contemporary Music Review, 9, 191-207.
- 1994. Extraction d'indices et catégorisation dans l'écoute de la musique chez l'enfant. In I. Deliège (ed), Proceedings of the 3rd ICMPC (International Conference for Music Perception and Cognition), pp. 287–288, Liège, ESCOM; co-auteur, Myriam Dupont
- 1994. Musical schemata in real time listening. In I. Deliège (ed), Proceedings of the 3rd ICMPC (International Conference for Music Perception and Cognition), pp. 271–272, Liège, ESCOM; co-authors, Marc Mélen, Ian Cross & Diana Stammers
- 1995. Aspects théoriques du concept de représentation mentale appliqué à l'écoute de la musique. In Actes del Premio Convegno Internazionale di Studi Musicale « Tendenze e metodi nella ricerca musocologica », Latina (Italy) septembre 1990.
- 1995. Extraction of cues or underlying harmonic structure: Which guide recognition of familiar melodies? European Journal of Cognitive Psychology; co-author, Marc Mélen
- 1995. The two steps of the categorization process. In R. Steinberg (ed), Music and the Mind Machine, Psychophysiology and Psychopathology of the Sense of Music, pp. 63–73. Springer, Heidelberg.
- 1995. Audition musicale et expérience émotionnelle. In H. Lejeune, F. Macar et V. Pouthas (eds), Des animaux et des hommes. Hommage à Marc Richelle. Paris, P.U.F., pp. 215–238.
- 1995. Cue abstraction in the schematization of the musical form. Scientific Contributions to General Psychology, 11-28.
- 1996. Cue abstraction as a component of categorisation processes in music listening. Psychology of Music, 24 (2), 131-156.
- 1996. Musical pitch cognition in development : effects of training and education. In B. Pennycook and E. Costa-Giomi (eds), Proceedings of the 4th ICMPC, Montréal Mc Gill University, pp. 287–290; co-authors, Daisy Bertrand, Alex Lamont, Ian Cross.
- 1996. The cognitive representation of tonal musical structure. In B. Pennycook and E. Costa-Giomi (eds), Proceedings of the 4th ICMPC, Montréal, Mc Gill University, pp. 59–63; co-authors, Marc Mélen, Ian Cross & Diana Stammers.
- 1996. Musical schemata in real time listening to Music. Music Perception, 14(2), 117-160; co-authors, Marc Mélen, Ian Cross & Diana Stammers.
- 1997. Cue abstraction in listening to music. In I. Deliège & J.A. Sloboda (eds), Perception and cognition of Music, Psychology Press, Hove, UK, 387-412.
- 1997. Tristan's « Alte Weise », an experimental approach. In A. Gabrielsson (ed), Proceedings of the 3rd Triennal Conference of ESCOM, Uppsala University, Sweden, 1997, pp. 48–54.
- 1997. The development of Pitch relations in adulthood : Effects of Training and Education. In A. Gabrielsson (ed) Proceedings of the 3rd Triennal Conference of ESCOM, Uppsala University, Sweden, pp. 407–411; co-auteurs, D. Bertrand, A. Lamont & Ian Cross.
- 1997. Similarity in processes of categorisation: Imprint formation as a prototype effect in music listening. In M. Ramscar, U. Hahn, E. Cambouropolos & H. Pain (eds), Proceedings of SimCat 1997: an Interdisciplinary Workshop on Similarity and Categorization. University of Edinburgh, pp. 59–66.
- 1997. Perception and Cognition of Music, general introduction. In D. Fallows (ed), Proceedings of the 16th Conference of the International Sty of Musicology, London, Oxford University Press.
- 1997. Development of grouping processes in listening to music : an integrative view. Polish Quarterly of Developmental Psychology, vol. 3 (1), 21-42; co-authors, Daisy Bertrand, Marc Mélen.
- 1998. Wagner "Alte Weise" : Une approche perceptive. Musicae Scientiae, numéro spécial, 63-90.
- 1998. Music listening and emotional experience. In Psicologia cognitiva e composizione musicale. Intersezioni e prospettive comuni. Roma, Kappa, pp. 47–67 (invited paper).
- 1998. The perception of the opposition Invariant / Variant. Experimental study on Steve REICH, Four Organs. In Commemorative publication (Festschrift) for the 60th anniversary of Mrs Helga de la Motte-Haber. Verlag Königshausen & Neumannn, pp. 105–126 (invited paper ).
- 1998. Perceiving Similarities and Differences in Listening to a Piece of Music. A re-reading of a real-time listening model in relation to Anticipation. In D. Dubois (ed), Proceedings CASYS Conference. International Journal of Computing Anticipatory Systems, vol. 4, 1999, 179-189.
- 1999. Psychologie de la Musique : Fondements, théoriques et orientations actuelles. Scientific Contributions to General Psychology, 3/4. Roma, Italy (invited paper).
- 2000. Listening to a piece of music. A schematizating process based on abstracted surface cues. In D. Greer (ed), Musicology and Sister Disciplines: Past, Present, Future. Proceedings of the 16th International Congress of the International Musicological Society, London, 1997, pp. 71–87. Oxford, Oxford University Press.
- 2002. The role of Similarity in the cue abstraction model: Implicit or explicit in listening ? Proceedings of the Conference ISMIR, IRCAM, Paris.
- 2002. Orchestral or solo motifs : which is easiest for recognition. In I. Deliège, Musical Creativity. Proceedings of the 10th anniversary Conference of ESCOM (Cdrom). Liège, April 2002 (co-author, Marc Mélen).
- 2002. Using neuroimaging to study neural correlates of music over wide spatial and temporal scales. In C. Stevens, D. Burnham, G. McPherson, E. Schubert & J. Renwick (eds), Proceedings of the 7th ICMPC (CDrom). Sydney, July 2002 (co-authors A. Ioannidès, M. Popescu, A. Otsuka, A. Abrahamyan).
- 2002. La perceptione della musica. In J.J. Nattiez (ed), Enciclopedia della musica (in quattro volume), pp. 305–334. Torino, Giulio Enaudi (invited paper).
- 2005. La perception de la musique. In Encyclopédie de la musique en quatre volumes. Traduction française. Editions Actes-Sud, pp. 359–389.
- 2005. Analogie : support créatif dans l’éducation de l’écoute musicale. In Proceedings of the Convegno internazionale su Educazione musicale e Formazione (CDrom). Bologna (Italy).
- 2005. Constantes psicollogicas en la percepcion de la obra musical : herencias teoricas elaboraciones recientes. Eufonia, 34, Special issue Didatica della Musica, 33-43.
- 2006. Emergence, Anticipation and Schematization Processes in Listening to a Piece of Music. A re-reading of the cue abstraction model. In P. Locher, C. Martindale & L. Dorfman (eds), pp. 153–174. New directions in aesthetics, creativity, and the arts. New York, Baywood.
- 2006. Analogy, creative support to elaborate a model of music listening. In I. Deliège & G.Wiggins (eds), Musical creativity. Multidisciplinary research in theory and practice. pp. 63–77. Hove, Psychology Press, Taylor & Francis group.
- 2007. Similarity relations in listening to music: How do they come into play ? Musicæ Scientiæ, Discussion Forum 4a, 9-37.
- 2010. Parallelism and auditory analysis of music. In R. Bader, C. Neuhaus & U. Morgenstern (eds). Concepts, experiments, and Fieldwork : Studies in systematic musicology and ethnomusicology, pp. 217–232. Frankfurt/Main, Peter Lang.
