= Aniruddh D. Patel =

Cognitive psychologist

- Occupation: Professor of Psychology
- Awards: Deems Taylor Award (ASCAP); Music Has Power Award (IMNF); Guggenheim Fellowship

Academic background
- Education: University of Virginia; Harvard University

Aniruddh (Ani) D. Patel is a cognitive psychologist known for his research on music cognition and the cognitive neuroscience of music. He is Professor of Psychology at Tufts University, Massachusetts. From a background in evolutionary biology, his work includes empirical research, theoretical studies, brain imaging techniques, and acoustical analysis applied to areas such as cognitive musicology (how humans process music), parallel relationships between music and language, and evolutionary musicology (cross-species comparisons). Patel received a Guggenheim Fellowship in 2018 to support his work on the evolution of musical cognition.

== Music, Language, and the Brain ==
Patel received the Deems Taylor Award from the American Society of Composers, Authors and Publishers, and the Music Has Power Award from the Institute for Music and Neurologic Function for his 2008 book, Music, Language and the Brain. Oliver Sacks considered Music, Language, and the Brain "a major synthesis that will be indispensable to neuroscientists." Josh McDermott, head of MIT's Laboratory for Computational Audition, found Patel's focus on the syntax of music and language with its potential for revelations into similarities in their underlying mechanical operations especially significant. Ray Jackendoff, co-author with Fred Lerdahl of A Generative Theory of Tonal Music, suggested a cautious approach in distinguishing parallels between music and language without accounting for other cognitive domains that may share such capacities.

== Education ==
Patel received his B.A. in biology from the University of Virginia in 1987. He attended graduate school at Harvard University where he earned an MA and subsequently a PhD in Organismic and Evolutionary Biology in 1996. In a New York Times interview, Patel explained that from childhood his passions had always been science and music. In college, he concentrated mostly on cell biology until his senior year, when his interest was ignited by courses in animal behavior and evolution, and he thought he might study music as a biologist. Patel's Harvard graduate studies took place under Edward O. Wilson's supervision. Before he found his footing and established the direction of his future research, he acquired laboratory and fieldwork experience in ant behavior both in Wilson's laboratory and in the Australian outback. His thesis, A Biological Study of the Relationship Between Language and Music, was mentored by Wilson and Evan Balaban. Patel also obtained support from speech and language researchers and specialists at other institutions.

== Professional career ==
Following graduate school, Patel joined The Neurosciences Institute in San Diego, CA, under the direction of Gerald Edelman. In 2005, he was appointed the Esther J. Burnham Senior Fellow, and he remained at the Institute until 2012 when he joined Tufts University as an associate professor in the Department of Psychology. At Tufts, he is a participating member of the Stibel Dennett Consortium, a faculty group that encourages teaching initiatives and scholarship relating to the brain and cognition. In addition to research and academic activities, Patel is being active in a number of related organizations. From 2009 to 2011, he was president of the Society for Music Perception and Cognition (SMPC), an organization dedicated to the study of musical cognition.

Patel is a Fellow at the Canadian Institute for Advanced Research (CIFAR), a global research organization that recognizes and supports international, innovative, high-impact research. He was named a Fellow of the Radcliffe Institute for Advanced Studies (Social Sciences) for 2018-2019 and was a visiting scholar in the Department of Human Evolutionary Biology at Harvard University.

== Research ==
Since Patel's initial research forays into the neuroscience of music, the field has gained definition and expanded both by the number of disciplines conducting research in the area and the intensity of attention paid to certain topics. He remains focused on the areas outlined in Music, Language, and the Brain: sound elements: pitch and timbre; rhythm; syntax; meaning; and evolution. Patel finds greater parallels in the mechanical/syntactical structural elements than in the semantics (meaning, content) of music and language. His work takes advantage of advances in neuroscience that enable the mapping of parallel processing of brain activity in music and language applications. For example, he found additional support for his shared syntactic integration resource hypothesis in a 2003 study that explored the idea that the syntactical elements of both music and language draw upon the same area, one that provides limited processing resources. This was seen as an opportunity to further explore the brain's processing abilities with regard to hierarchical, syntactical structures.

A 2018 collaboration between Ola Ozernov-Palchik and Patel examines rhythmic processing in music to see if beat-based musical processing may have any effect on reading abilities and, if so, what significance this may have on the reading abilities of young children. Patel's OPERA hypothesis suggests that adaptive plasticity for specific neural areas beneficial to speech processing can be derived from musical training when five conditions are met: O - Overlap; P - Precision; E - Emotion; R - Repetition; and A - Attention. A drop-down effect is suggested from the greater precision demanded by musical training to the language acquisition areas shared by the neural networks. Thus it may be possible to discover ways in which musical training can be used to enhance language skills. A continuing interest is the exploration of stress patterns in spoken languages and the potential parallels with music composed by native speakers of those languages. (See Video Appearances.)

With John Iversen and others, Patel has explored how brain mechanisms perceive and process rhythm as well as the relationship of music and language processing. A 2021 study with J.J. Cannon focuses on how beat anticipation is neurally implemented by processes occurring in the supplementary motor area and the dorsal striatum.

A significant area of interest for Patel concerns communications among and across species, and the evolutionary roots of human language and music. His search for the origins of rhythm (beat) and melody have led to explorations of the vocal and rhythmic behavior of monkeys, birds, and parrots. After failing to find anticipated rhythmic correlational correspondences in chimpanzees, Patel was surprised to learn about Snowball, a cockatoo with a fine sense of rhythm. By 2019, he had not only studied the cockatoo's timing but also the creativity involved in its various moves.

== Video appearances ==
Patel shares his research with audiences across many different venues, and a number of video appearances are available on YouTube. In 2008, at the Library of Congress, he spoke about "The Music of Language and the Language of Music." At the 2015 Conference of Chorus America, he shared research on how brain function may be positively affected through singing. In January, 2017, he appeared on a panel with experts gathered by the National Institutes of Health and the John F. Kennedy Center for the Performing Arts to discuss current research on music and the brain and its implications for human health. In 2017 at Columbia University, Patel presented results from research seeking cross-species competencies in three areas common to human perception: a) ability to recognize transposed melodies or pitch patterns, b) ability to predict beats, and c) ability to respond emotionally to music. A major outreach initiative for people interested in the field is his 18-part program "Music and the Brain" for Great Courses.

An especially informative video episode is part of a MathScienceMusic series from New York University. Patel provides the Normalized Pairwise Variability Index (nPVI) equation long used by linguists to compare patterns in speech. After establishing stylistic contrasts in stress patterns in French and English spoken language, he applies the formula to musical compositions by native composers of both countries. While strong contrasts are found in the language examples, similar although weaker contrasts are found in the musical excerpts. The strength of this comparison is particularly important because the musical contrasts do not rely on beat, pulse or other characteristic aspects of music that are not found in language. Rather they demonstrate a parallel with the prevalent characteristics of the stressed and unstressed syllables of the spoken language.

== Book ==
- Patel, A. D. (2008). Music, Language, and the Brain. Oxford University Press, Inc. .

== Representative papers ==
- Patel, A. D. (2003). Language, music, syntax and the brain. Nature Neuroscience, 6(7), 674–681.
- Patel, A. D. (2011). Why would musical training benefit the neural encoding of speech? The OPERA hypothesis. Frontiers in Psychology, 2, 142.
- Patel, A.D. (2014). Can nonlinguistic musical training change the way the brain processes speech? The expanded OPERA hypothesis. Hearing Research, 308, 98–108.
- Patel, A.D. (2019). Evolutionary music cognition: Cross-species studies. In: P. J. Rentfrow & D. Levitin (Eds.) Foundations in Music Psychology: Theory and Research. (459–501). Cambridge, MA: MIT Press
- Patel, A.D. and Daniele, J.R. (2003). An empirical comparison of rhythm in language and music. Cognition 87(1), B35-B45.
- Patel, A. D., Gibson, E., Ratner, J., Besson, M., & Holcomb, P. J. (1998). Processing syntactic relations in language and music: An event-related potential study. Journal of Cognitive Neuroscience, 10(6), 717-733.
- Patel A.D., Peretz, I., Tramo, M., Labrecque, R. (1998). Processing prosodic and musical patterns: a neuropsychological investigation. Brain and Language, 61, 123–144.
