= Cognitive musicology =

Branch of cognitive science

Cognitive musicology is a branch of cognitive science concerned with computationally modeling musical knowledge with the goal of understanding both music and cognition.

Cognitive musicology can be differentiated from other branches of music psychology via its methodological emphasis, using computer modeling to study music-related knowledge representation with roots in artificial intelligence and cognitive science. The use of computer models provides an exacting, interactive medium in which to formulate and test theories.

This interdisciplinary field investigates topics such as the parallels between language and music in the brain. Biologically inspired models of computation are often included in research, such as neural networks and evolutionary programs. This field seeks to model how musical knowledge is represented, stored, perceived, performed, and generated. By using a well-structured computer environment, the systematic structures of these cognitive phenomena can be investigated.

Even while enjoying the simplest of melodies there are multiple brain processes that are synchronizing to comprehend what is going on. After the stimulus enters and undergoes the processes of the ear, it enters the auditory cortex, part of the temporal lobe, which begins processing the sound by assessing its pitch and volume. From here, brain functioning differs amongst the analysis of different aspects of music. For instance, the rhythm is processed and regulated by the left frontal cortex, the left parietal cortex and the right cerebellum standardly. Tonality, the building of musical structure around a central chord, is assessed by the prefrontal cortex and cerebellum (Abram, 2015). Music is able to access many different brain functions that play an integral role in other higher brain functions such as motor control, memory, language, reading and emotion. Research has shown that music can be used as an alternative method to access these functions that may be unavailable through non-musical stimulus due to a disorder. Musicology explores the use of music and how it can provide alternative transmission routes for information processing in the brain for diseases such as Parkinson's and dyslexia as well.

== Notable researchers ==
The polymath Christopher Longuet-Higgins, who coined the term "cognitive science", is one of the pioneers of cognitive musicology. Among other things, he is noted for the computational implementation of an early key-finding algorithm. Key finding is an essential element of tonal music, and the key-finding problem has attracted considerable attention in the psychology of music over the past several decades. Carol Krumhansl and Mark Schmuckler proposed an empirically grounded key-finding algorithm which bears their names. Their approach is based on key-profiles which were painstakingly determined by what has come to be known as the probe-tone technique. This algorithm has successfully been able to model the perception of musical key in short excerpts of music, as well as to track listeners' changing sense of key movement throughout an entire piece of music. David Temperley, whose early work within the field of cognitive musicology applied dynamic programming to aspects of music cognition, has suggested a number of refinements to the Krumhansl-Schmuckler Key-Finding Algorithm.

Otto Laske was a champion of cognitive musicology. A collection of papers that he co-edited served to heighten the visibility of cognitive musicology and to strengthen its association with AI and music. The foreword of this book reprints a free-wheeling interview with Marvin Minsky, one of the founding fathers of AI, in which he discusses some of his early writings on music and the mind. AI researcher turned cognitive scientist Douglas Hofstadter has also contributed a number of ideas pertaining to music from an AI perspective. Musician Steve Larson, who worked for a time in Hofstadter's lab, formulated a theory of "musical forces" derived by analogy with physical forces. Hofstadter also weighed in on David Cope's experiments in musical intelligence, which take the form of a computer program called EMI which produces music in the form of, say, Bach, or Chopin, or Cope.

Cope's programs are written in Lisp, which turns out to be a popular language for research in cognitive musicology. Desain and Honing have exploited Lisp in their efforts to tap the potential of microworld methodology in cognitive musicology research. Also working in Lisp, Heinrich Taube has explored computer composition from a wide variety of perspectives. There are, of course, researchers who chose to use languages other than Lisp for their research into the computational modeling of musical processes. Robert Rowe, for example, explores "machine musicianship" through C++ programming. A rather different computational methodology for researching musical phenomena is the toolkit approach advocated by David Huron. At a higher level of abstraction, Geraint Wiggins has investigated general properties of music knowledge representations such as structural generality and expressive completeness.

Although a great deal of cognitive musicology research features symbolic computation, notable contributions have been made from the biologically inspired computational paradigms. For example, Jamshed Bharucha and Peter Todd have modeled music perception in tonal music with neural networks. Al Biles has applied genetic algorithms to the composition of jazz solos. Numerous researchers have explored algorithmic composition grounded in a wide range of mathematical formalisms.

Within cognitive psychology, among the most prominent researchers is Diana Deutsch, who has engaged in a wide variety of work ranging from studies of absolute pitch and musical illusions to the formulation of musical knowledge representations to relationships between music and language. Equally important is Aniruddh D. Patel, whose work combines traditional methodologies of cognitive psychology with neuroscience. Patel is also the author of a comprehensive survey of cognitive science research on music.

The AI approach to music perception and cognition based on finding structures in data without knowing the structures — similarly to segregating objects in abstract painting without assigning meaningful labels to them — was pioneered by Andranik Tangian. The idea is to find the least complex data representations in the sense of Kolmogorov, i.e. requiring the least memory storage, which can be regarded as saving the brain energy. The illustration that perception is data representation rather than "physical" recognition is the effect of polyphonic voices produced by a loudspeaker — a single physical body, and the effect of a single tone produced by several physical bodies — organ register pipes tuned as a chord and activated by a single key. This data representation approach enables the recognition of interval relations in chords and tracing polyphonic voices with no reference to pitch (thereby explaining the predominance of interval hearing over absolute hearing) and to break the rhythm-tempo vicious circle while rhythm recognition under variable tempo.

Perhaps the most significant contribution to viewing music from a linguistic perspective is the Generative Theory of Tonal Music (GTTM) proposed by Fred Lerdahl and Ray Jackendoff. Although GTTM is presented at the algorithmic level of abstraction rather than the implementational level, their ideas have found computational manifestations in a number of computational projects, in particular, to structuralize musical performance and to adjust meaningful performance timing.

For the German-speaking area, Laske's conception of cognitive musicology has been advanced by Uwe Seifert in his book Systematische Musiktheorie und Kognitionswissenschaft. Zur Grundlegung der kognitiven Musikwissenschaft ("Systematic music theory and cognitive science. The foundation of cognitive musicology") and subsequent publications.

== Music and language acquisition skills ==
Both music and speech rely on sound processing and require interpretation of several sound features such as timbre, pitch, duration, and their interactions (Elzbieta, 2015). A fMRI study revealed that the Broca's and Wernicke's areas, two areas that are known to be activated during speech and language processing, were found activated while the subject was listening to unexpected musical chords (Elzbieta, 2015). This relation between language and music may explain why, it has been found that exposure to music has produced an acceleration in the development of behaviors related to the acquisition of language. The Suzuki music education which is very widely known, emphasizes learning music by ear over reading musical notation and preferably begins with formal lessons between the ages of 3 and 5 years. One fundamental reasoning in favor of this education points to a parallelism between natural speech acquisition and purely auditory based musical training as opposed to musical training due to visual cues. There is evidence that children who take music classes have obtained skills to help them in language acquisition and learning (Oechslin, 2015), an ability that relies heavily on the dorsal pathway. Other studies show an overall enhancement of verbal intelligence in children taking music classes. Since both activities tap into several integrated brain functions and have shared brain pathways it is understandable why strength in music acquisition might also correlate with strength in language acquisition.

== Music and pre-natal development ==
Extensive prenatal exposure to a melody has been shown to induce neural representations that last for several months. In a study done by Partanen in 2013, mothers in the learning group listened to the 'Twinkle twinkle little star' melody 5 times per week during their last trimester. After birth and again at the age of 4 months, they played the infants in the control and learning group a modified melody in which some of the notes were changed. Both at birth and at the age of 4 months, infants in the learning group had stronger event related potentials to the unchanged notes than the control group. Since listening to music at a young age can already map out neural representations that are lasting, exposure to music could help strengthen brain plasticity in areas of the brain that are involved in language and speech processing.

== Music therapy effect on cognitive disorders ==
If neural pathways can be stimulated with entertainment there is a higher chance that it will be more easily accessible. This illustrates why music is so powerful and can be used in such a myriad of different therapies. Music that is enjoyable to a person elicit an interesting response that we are all aware of. Listening to music is not perceived as a chore because it is enjoyable, however our brain is still learning and utilizing the same brain functions as it would when speaking or acquiring language. Music has the capability to be a very productive form of therapy mostly because it is stimulating, entertaining, and appears rewarding. Using fMRI, Menon and Levitin found for the first time that listening to music strongly modulates activity in a network of mesolimbic structures involved in reward processing. This included the nucleus accumbens and the ventral tegmental area (VTA), as well as the hypothalamus, and insula, which are all thought to be involved in regulating autonomic and physiological responses to rewarding and emotional stimuli (Gold, 2013).

Pitch perception was positively correlated with phonemic awareness and reading abilities in children (Flaugnacco, 2014). Likewise, the ability to tap to a rhythmic beat correlated with performance on reading and attention tests (Flaugnacco, 2014). These are only a fraction of the studies that have linked reading skills with rhythmic perception, which is shown in a meta-analysis of 25 cross-sectional studies that found a significant association between music training and reading skills (Butzlaff, 2000). Since the correlation is so extensive it is natural that researchers have tried to see if music could serve as an alternative pathway to strengthen reading abilities in people with developmental disorders such as dyslexia. Dyslexia is a disorder characterized by a long lasting difficulty in reading acquisition, specifically text decoding. Reading results have been shown to be slow and inaccurate, despite adequate intelligence and instruction. The difficulties have been shown to stem from a phonological core deficit that impacts reading comprehension, memory and prediction abilities (Flaugnacco, 2014). It was shown that music training modified reading and phonological abilities even when these skills are severely impaired. By improving temporal processing and rhythm abilities, through training, phonological awareness and reading skills in children with dyslexia were improved. The OPERA hypothesis proposed by Patel (2011), states that since music places higher demands on the process than speech it brings adaptive brain plasticity of the same neural network involved in language processing.

Parkinson's disease is a complex neurological disorder that negatively impacts both motor and non-motor functions caused by the degeneration of dopaminergic (DA) neurons in the substantia nigra (Ashoori, 2015). This in turn leads to a DA deficiency in the basal ganglia. The deficiencies of dopamine in these areas of the brain have shown to cause symptoms such as tremors at rest, rigidity, akinesia, and postural instability. They are also associated with impairments of internal timing of an individual (Ashoori, 2015). Rhythm is a powerful sensory cue that has shown to help regulate motor timing and coordination when there is a deficient internal timing system in the brain. Some studies have shown that musically cued gait training significantly improves multiple deficits of Parkinson's, including in gait, motor timing, and perceptual timing. Ashoori's study consisted of 15 non-demented patients with idiopathic Parkinson's who had no prior musical training and maintained their dopamine therapy during the trials. There were three 30-min training sessions per week for 1 month where the participants walked to the beats of German folk music without explicit instructions to synchronize their footsteps to the beat. Compared to pre-training gait performance, the Parkinson's patients showed significant improvement in gait velocity and stride length during the training sessions. The gait improvement was sustained for 1 month after training, which indicates a lasting therapeutic effect. Even though this was uncued it shows how the gait of these Parkinson's patients was automatically synchronized with the rhythm of the music. The lasting therapeutic effect also shows that this might have affected the internal timing of the individual in a way that could not be accessed by other means.

== See also ==
- Cognitive neuroscience of music
- Music psychology
- Psychoacoustics
- Music therapy
