= Cognitive Constraints on Compositional Systems =

Essay by Fred Lerdahl

"Cognitive Constraints on Compositional Systems" is an essay by Fred Lerdahl that cites Pierre Boulez's Le Marteau sans maître (1955) as an example of "a huge gap between compositional system and cognized result," though he "could have illustrated just as well with works by Milton Babbitt, Elliott Carter, Luigi Nono, Karlheinz Stockhausen, or Iannis Xenakis". (In semiological terms, this is a gap between the esthesic and poietic processes.) To explain this gap, and in hopes of bridging it, Lerdahl proposes the concept of a musical grammar, "a limited set of rules that can generate indefinitely large sets of musical events and/or their structural descriptions". He divides this further into compositional grammar and listening grammar, the latter being one "more or less unconsciously employed by auditors, that generates mental representations of the music". He divides the former into natural and artificial compositional grammars. While the two have historically been fruitfully mixed, a natural grammar arises spontaneously in a culture while an artificial one is a conscious invention of an individual or group in a culture; the gap can arise only between listening grammar and artificial grammars. To begin to understand the listening grammar, Lerdahl and Ray Jackendoff created a theory of musical cognition, A Generative Theory of Tonal Music (1983; ISBN 0-262-62107-X). That theory is outlined in the essay.

== Constraints ==
Lerdahl's constraints on artificial compositional grammars are:

=== Event sequences ===
- Constraint 1: The musical surface must be capable of being parsed into a sequence of discrete events.
  - [counterexample: Ligeti, computer music]
- Constraint 2: The musical surface must be available for hierarchical structuring by the listening grammar.
  - [through grouping structure, metrical structure, time-span reduction, and prolongational reduction. "Associational" factors such as motivic development and timbral relations are ignored, but for "Timbral Hierarchies" see Lerdahl 1987]
- Constraint 3: The establishment of local grouping boundaries requires the presence of salient distinctive transitions at the musical surface.
  - [counterexample: minimal music]
- Constraint 4: Projections of groups, especially at larger levels, depends on symmetry and on the establishment of musical parallelisms.
- Constraint 5: The establishment of a metrical structure requires a degree of regularity in the placement of phenomenal accents.
- Constraint 6: A complex time-span segmentation depends on the projection of complex grouping and metrical structures.
- Constraint 7: The projection of a time-span tree depends on a complex time-span segmentation in conjunction with a set of stability conditions.
- Constraint 8: The projection of a prolongational tree depends on a corresponding time-span tree in conjunction with a set of stability conditions.

=== Underlying materials ===
- Constraint 9: Stability conditions must operate on a fixed collection of elements.
  - [usually pitches or rather fundamentals with harmonic partials]
- Constraint 10: Intervals between elements of a collection arranged along a scale should fall within a certain range of magnitude.
- Constraint 11: A pitch collection should recur at the octave to produce pitch classes.
  - [octave equivalency]
- Constraint 12: There must be a strong psychoacoustic basis for stability conditions. For pitch collections, that requires intervals that proceed gradually from very small to comparatively large frequency ratios.
  - [just intonation]
- Constraint 13: Division of the octave into equal parts facilitates transposition and reduces memory load.
  - [equal temperament]
- Constraint 14: Assume pitch sets of n-fold equal divisions of the octave. Then subsets that satisfy uniqueness, coherence, and simplicity will facilitate location within the overall pitch space.
  - [only certain divisions of the octave, 12 and 20 included, allow uniqueness, coherence, and transpositional simplicity, and only the diatonic and pentatonic subsets of the 12-tone chromatic set follow these constraints (Balzano, 1980, 1982)]

=== Pitch space ===
- Constraint 15: Any but the most primitive stability conditions must be susceptible to multidimensional representation, where spatial distance correlates with cognitive distance.
- Constraint 16: Levels of pitch space must be sufficiently available from musical surfaces to be internalized.
- Constraint 17: A reductionally organized pitch space is needed to express the steps and skips by which cognitive distance is measured and to express degrees of melodic completeness.
  - [completedness resembles implication-realization theory (Meyer, 1973 and Narmour, 1977), the Zug, Urlinie, and Bassbrechung (Schenker).]

He concludes, "Some of these constraints seem to me binding, others optional. Constraints 9–12 are essential for the very existence of stability conditions. Constraints 13–17, on the other hand, can be variously jettisoned." Examples given are South Indian music, which doesn't modulate and isn't equally tempered (13 & 14), and music such as that of Claude Debussy, Béla Bartók, and others who "have developed consonance-dissonance patterns directly from the total chromatic" (14–17).

== Comprehensibility and value ==
- Aesthetic Claim 1: The best music utilizes the full potential of our cognitive resources.
- Aesthetic Claim 2: The best music arises from an alliance of a compositional grammar with the listening grammar.

To these ends he proposes the use of the terms "complexity" and "complicatedness", complexity being hierarchical structural richness, and complicatedness being "numerous non-redundant events per unit time." On Lerdahl's view complexity has aesthetic value, while complicatedness is neutral. He writes, "All sorts of music satisfy these criteria—for example, Indian raga, Japanese koto, jazz, and most Western art music. Rock music fails on grounds of insufficient complexity. Much contemporary music pursues complicatedness as compensation for a lack of complexity. In short, these criteria allow for infinite variety but only along certain lines."

"I find this conclusion both exciting and—initially at least—alarming...the constraints are tighter than I bargained for."

"My second aesthetic claim in effect rejects this ['progressivist'] attitude in favor of the older view that music-making should be based on 'nature.' For the ancients, nature may have resided in the music of the spheres, but for us it lies in the musical mind."

== Reception ==
Lerdahl's paper has elicited many responses.

Roger Scruton praised it, calling it "hard-hitting".

Nicholas Cook wrote, "The idea that music is a process of communication in which listeners decode structures that composers have encoded... is... based on several disputable assumptions: that people choose to listen grammatically; that there is, or ought to be, an equivalence between compositional and listening grammars; and, most fundamentally, that there is such a thing as musical grammar". He writes that Lerdahl

assume[s] that there should be a more or less linear relationship between the manner in which a composer conceives a composition and the manner in which a listener perceives it. ...Lerdahl's aim is to specify the conditions that must be fulfilled if there is to be conformity between "compositional grammar" and "listening grammar". And... he ends up by measuring existing music against the stipulations of his theory, using this as a basis for aesthetic evaluation. The result is to write off not only the Darmstadt avant-garde and minimalism, but also huge swathes of non-Western and popular music.

He asks:

What... does an article like Lerdahl's "Cognitive Constraints on Compositional Systems" actually do? By subordinating the production and reception of music to theoretically defined criteria of communicative success, it creates a charmed hermeneutic circle that excludes everything from critical musicology to social psychology. It slips imperceptibly from description to prescription, so reinforcing the hegemony of theory. In this way, while the literary genre of Lerdahl's article is the scientific paper – a genre predicated on the transparent representation of an external reality – its substance lies at least equally in its illocutionary force.

Morag Josephine Grant wrote, "The paradox of Lerdahl's argument... is that while it is perfectly acceptable to adopt the composer's own system when dealing with compositional-technical analysis, it seems equally acceptable to revert to musical thinking of a quite different type when the aural result comes to be analysed". She continued, "Lerdahl's argument that musical language, like spoken language, is generative in structure excludes the possibility of other, non-hierarchical methods of achieving musical coherence... Lerdahl's concentration on the audibility of the row... blinds or deafens him to the simple fact that the use of the row is itself a constraint, not just on the composer, but in the aid of comprehensibility as well".

John Croft's master's degree thesis examines Lerdahl's essay in depth. In his conclusion, he wrote:

we have plenty of music that does not conform to Lerdahl's grammar: what, then, are people who claim to find it as interesting as tonal-metrical music actually doing? Either they are deluding themselves, or they are lying, or they have non-human brains. None of these answers seems entirely satisfactory. But if we do not like any of these answers, then we must admit that it is a matter of exposure and acquired understanding after all, in which case we are certainly a far cry from innate psychological universals [...] Vague language and tacit assumptions can be brought into the service of conservatism and aesthetic authoritarianism. It points to the misguided nature of attempts to turn the question of the dissemination of post-tonal music from an aesthetic, political, and indeed economic issue into a cognitive-scientific one. In this age when words like "accessibility" and "communication" are used too frequently and with too little understanding, it is of some significance that at least one major attempt to give scientific respectability to the conservative side of the debate fails.

For additional opinions and discussion, see Boros (1995), Boros (1996), Denham (2009), Dibben (1996), Heinemann (1993), Heinemann (1998), and Mosch (2004).
