= Biomusicology =

Field of Musical Study

Biomusicology is the study of music from a biological point of view. The term was coined by Nils L. Wallin in 1991 to encompass several branches of music psychology and musicology, including evolutionary musicology, neuromusicology, and comparative musicology.

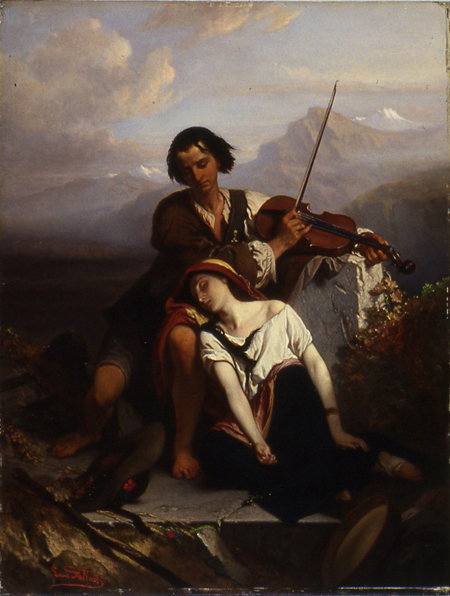
Power of Music by Louis Gallait. A brother and sister resting before an old tomb. The brother is attempting to comfort his sibling by playing the violin, and she has fallen into a deep sleep, "oblivious of all grief, mental and physical"

Evolutionary musicology studies the "origins of music, the question of animal song, selection pressures underlying music evolution", and "music evolution and human evolution". Neuromusicology studies the "brain areas involved in music processing, neural and cognitive processes of musical processing", and "ontogeny of musical capacity and musical skill". Comparative musicology studies the "functions and uses of music, advantages and costs of music making", and "universal features of musical systems and musical behavior".

Applied biomusicology "attempts to provide biological insight into such things as the therapeutic uses of music in medical and psychological treatment; widespread use of music in the audiovisual media such as film and television; the ubiquitous presence of music in public places and its role in influencing mass behavior; and the potential use of music to function as a general enhancer of learning."

Whereas biomusicology refers to music among humans, zoomusicology extends the field to other species.

== See also ==
- Biogenetic structuralism
- Biolinguistics
- Biophony
- Bird song
- Chronobiology
- Cognitive musicology
- Cognitive neuroscience of music
- Culture in music cognition
- Entrainment (biomusicology)
- Evolutionary musicology
- Music psychology
- Music therapy
- Psychoacoustics
- Sociocultural evolution
- Zoomusicology
