= Lola Cuddy =

Canadian psychologist

Lola L. Cuddy
- Born: 1939 (age 86–87); Winnipeg, Manitoba

Academic background
- Education: University of Winnipeg; University of Toronto
- Doctoral advisor: Endel Tulving

Academic work
- Discipline: Psychology
- Sub-discipline: Music psychology
- Institutions: Queen's University

Lola L. Cuddy (born 1939) is a Canadian psychologist recognized for her contributions to the field of music psychology. She is a professor emerita in the Department of Psychology at Queen's University in Kingston, Ontario.

== Biography ==
Cuddy was born in 1939 and grew up in a musical family in Winnipeg, Manitoba. A trained pianist, she completed an undergraduate degree in psychology at United College (now the University of Winnipeg) in 1959, while also earning a diploma in music. She earned a master's degree (1961) and a PhD (1965) in psychology from the University of Toronto, under the supervision of Endel Tulving. In 1965, Cuddy and her husband, Mel Wiebe (a scholar of Victorian literature), left Toronto to accept positions at Queen's University.

In 1969, Cuddy established the Music Cognition Lab at Queen's University, the first music psychology laboratory in Canada and one of the first in the world. Her research program has examined a wide range of topics within music psychology, including melodic expectation, absolute pitch, and effects of musical training. A recent line of research explored music processing among individuals with Alzheimer's disease. This work garnered media attention for the finding that patients with memory loss associated with dementia may be able to maintain musical memories.

Cuddy served as editor of the journal Music Perception from 2002 to 2017, and as a consulting editor to the journals Musicae Scientiae and Psychomusicology. She was the president of the Society for Music Perception and Cognition from 2001 to 2002.

== Honours and awards ==
- 1987: Fellow, Canadian Psychological Association
- 2005: David Horrobin Prize for Medical Theory
- 2011: Lifetime Achievement Award, Society for Music Perception and Cognition
- 2011: Fellow, Association for Psychological Science
- 2017: Fellow, Canadian Society for Brain, Behaviour, and Cognitive Science

== Selected works ==
- Cuddy, Lola L.; Cohen, Annabel J.; Miller, Janet (1979). "Melody recognition: The experimental application of musical rules". Canadian Journal of Psychology. 33 (3): 148–157. doi:10.1037/h0081713. PMID 519545.
- Cuddy, Lola L.; Cohen, Annabel J.; Mewhort, D. J. K. (1981). "Perception of structure in short melodic sequences". Journal of Experimental Psychology: Human Perception and Performance. 7 (4): 869–883. doi:10.1037/0096-1523.7.4.869.
- Cuddy, Lola L.; Badertscher, Betsy (1987). "Recovery of the tonal hierarchy: Some comparisons across age and levels of musical experience". Perception & Psychophysics. 41 (6): 609–620. doi:10.3758/BF03210493. PMID 3615155.
- Cuddy, Lola L.; Lunney, Carole A. (1995). "Expectancies generated by melodic intervals: Perceptual judgments of melodic continuity". Perception & Psychophysics. 57 (4): 451–462. doi:10.3758/BF03213071. PMID 7596743.
- Jakobson, Lorna S.; Cuddy, Lola L.; Kilgour, Andrea R. (2003). "Time Tagging: A Key to Musicians' Superior Memory". Music Perception. 20 (3): 307–313. doi:10.1525/mp.2003.20.3.307.
- "Memory for Melodies and Lyrics in Alzheimer's Disease". Music Perception. 29 (5): 479–491. 2012. doi:10.1525/mp.2012.29.5.479.
- Cuddy, Lola L.; Duffin, Jacalyn (2005). "Music, memory, and Alzheimer's disease: Is music recognition spared in dementia, and how can it be assessed?". Medical Hypotheses. 64 (2): 229–235. doi:10.1016/j.mehy.2004.09.005. PMID 15607545.
- Cuddy, Lola L. (2018). "Long-Term Memory for Music". Springer Handbook of Systematic Musicology. Springer Handbooks. pp. 453–459. doi:10.1007/978-3-662-55004-5_23. ISBN 978-3-662-55002-1.
