= European Society for the Cognitive Sciences of Music =

Non-profit society

The European Society for the Cognitive Sciences of Music (ESCOM) is an international non-profit learned society which aims to support theoretical, experimental, and applied research in the cognitive sciences of music. The society disseminates knowledge of music perception and cognition, and encourages European and international cooperation within the field of cognitive sciences of music.

ESCOM was established in 1991. To support its activities the Society publishes the journal Musicae Scientiae. Its first issue was published in 1997. The impact factor in 2014 was 1.4, and in 2018 it was 1.250. Irène Deliège was the founding editor of the journal and the first General Secretary of the Society. The current editor is Jane Ginsborg (Royal Northern College of Music). The journal publishes empirical, theoretical, and critical articles directed at increasing understanding of how music is perceived, represented, and generated. The journal deals with a wide range of topics, such as developmental psychology of music, musical creativity, similarity perception, music and evolution, music and emotion, and music performance. Musicæ Scientiæ appears four times in a year and is published from 2011 onwards by SAGE Publications.

In addition to publication activities, ESCOM organizes triennial conferences as well as seminars, educational programs, and summer schools. The first ESCOM conference was organized in Trieste, Italy (1991). In every six years ESCOM has a joint conference with the International Conference on Music Perception and Cognition.

Membership in ESCOM consists of Full Members, Student Members, Sustaining Members, and Honorary Members. Richard Parncutt (University of Graz) was president during 2015-2018; the current president is Renee Timmers (University of Sheffield).
