= Proto-language (disambiguation) =

A proto-language is a hypothetical or reconstructed language from which a number of known languages are believed to have descended in historical linguistics.

Proto-language may also refer to:

- Proto-language (glottogony), primitive language-like systems or forms of communication posited in theories of the origin of language
- Proto-human language, a hypothetical ancestor of all the world's languages
- Musical protolanguage, a theory of the origins of music and vocal communication

== See also ==
- Category:Proto-languages
