= Entrainment (biomusicology) =

Coordination of organisms towards sounds

A female California sea lion bobbing her head to an external beat.

Entrainment in the biomusicological sense refers to the synchronization (e.g., foot tapping) of organisms to an external perceived rhythm such as human music and dance. There are no species for which all individuals experience entrainment, although there are documented examples of entrained nonhuman individuals.

== Beat induction ==
Beat induction is the process in which a regular isochronous pulse is activated while one listens to music (i.e., the beat to which one would tap one's foot). It was thought that the cognitive mechanism that allows us to infer a beat from a sound pattern, and to synchronize or dance to it, was uniquely human. No primate tested so far can dance or collaboratively clap to the beat of the music. Humans know when to start, when to stop, when to speed up or to slow down, in synchronizing with their fellow dancers or musicians. Although primates do not appear to display beat induction, some parrots do. The most famous example, an Eleonora cockatoo named Snowball, was shown to display genuine dance, including changing his movements to a change in tempo (Patel et al., 2009)

Beat induction can be seen as a fundamental cognitive skill that allows for music (e.g., Patel, 2008; Honing, 2007; 2012). We can hear a pulse in a rhythmic pattern while it might not even be explicitly in there: The pulse is being induced (hence the name) while listening—like a perspective can be induced by looking at an arrangement of objects in a picture.

Neuroscientist Ani Patel proposes beat induction—referring to it as "beat-based rhythm processing"—as a key area in music-language research, suggesting beat induction "a fundamental aspect of music cognition that is not a byproduct of cognitive mechanisms that also serve other, more clearly adaptive, domains (e.g., auditory scene analysis or language)" (Patel, 2008).

== Evolutionary function ==
Joseph Jordania recently suggested that the human ability to be entrained was developed by the forces of natural selection as an important part of achieving the specific altered state of consciousness, battle trance. Achieving this state, in which humans lose their individuality, do not feel fear and pain, are united in a shared collective identity, and act in the best interests of the group, was crucial for the physical survival of their ancestors against the big African predators, after hominids descended from the safer trees to the dangerous ground and became terrestrial.

== Biological neuron model ==
Rapid motion of the fingers up and down together in phase (top), and finger motion that is out of phase (bottom.)

In addition to transmitting signals to other parts of the brain, neurons can modify the rules which neighboring neurons to in a process called biological synchronization. The figure to the right illustrates entrainment between finger motion of the left and right hands, but only if the motion of both hands are moving in the same direction. To illustrate this, begin by slowly moving the index fingers in an anti-phase manner, as shown in the bottom portion of the figure. Then, gradually increase the frequency to make the motion as rapid as possible. Eventually your fingers will be moving in phase, as shown in the top portion of the figure. It has been proposed that this behavior resembles the process by which neurons create a phase-locked loop that permits recognition of consonant musical intervals.

== See also ==
- Choir
- Evolutionary musicology
- Music therapy
- Unison
- Zoomusicology
- Restless legs syndrome
