= Ronan (sea lion) =

Sea lion known for dancing

- Species: Zalophus californianus
- Sex: Female
- Born: 2008 (age 17–18)
- Known for: Synchronizing to rhythms

Ronan is a sea lion who is known for being able to "dance" to music by moving her head and synchronizing her moves.

== Life ==
Ronan was born in the wild in 2008, but was deemed unreleasable in 2009 after becoming stranded thrice and suffering from malnutrition. She was adopted by the Pinniped Lab at the University of California, Santa Cruz in 2010. She initially served as a control subject in the research of graduate student Peter Cook, who was studying "the cognitive effects of a neurotoxin produced by certain algae found along the California coast"; many affected sea lions had been taken in by the program.

Starting in July 2011, at age three, she began training to bop her head to a metronome, inspired by similar studies on cockatoos and African gray parrots. She later began to do so to music as well, including rhythms she has not heard before. She has been trained in over 2,000 sessions. A 2025 study of Ronan found her ability to keep a beat to rival that of humans.

== See also ==
- Snowball (cockatoo)
