= Arches (Lerdahl) =

Arches (2010) is a musical composition by Fred Lerdahl for solo cello and large chamber ensemble commissioned by the Fromm Music Foundation for the cellist Anssi Karttunen. A finalist for the Pulitzer Prize for Music in 2011, it was premiered on November 19, 2010, at Miller Theatre, Columbia University, by Karttunen and the Argento Chamber Ensemble.

A dialogue between soloist and ensemble rather than a traditional concerto, the piece is "informed by the structure of Gothic cathedrals"; "the entire piece consisted of arches within arches, tracing individual phrases and across the entire piece." The piece is an example of Lerdahl's spiral form, "in which a simple and stable musical idea is expanded on," paired with Renaissance cantus firmus technique, the title "Arches" referring both to the characteristic rising and falling melodic contour and to "arcs of formal expansion and contraction."

== See also ==
- Arch form
