= Neil Cohn =

American cognitive scientist and comics theorist

- Born: January 11, 1980 (age 46)
- Education: Tufts; University of Chicago; UC Berkeley
- Known for: Visual language theory Contributions to comics theory and emoji theory
- Scientific career
- Fields: Cognitive science, linguistics, comics studies
- Workplaces: Tilburg University
- Doctoral advisor: Ray Jackendoff, Gina Kuperberg, Phillip Holcomb
- Other academic advisors: Marta Kutas, Jeff Elman

Neil Cohn (/koʊn/; born 1980) is an American cognitive scientist and comics theorist. His research focuses on the cognition of understanding comics, and uses an interdisciplinary approach combining aspects of theoretical and corpus linguistics with cognitive psychology and cognitive neuroscience.

Cohn’s work argues that common cognitive capacities underlie the processing of various expressive domains, especially verbal and signed languages and what he calls “visual language”—the structure and cognition of drawings and visual narratives, particularly those found in comics. His 2020 book, Who Understands Comics? explored the proficiency required to understand visual narratives, and was nominated for a 2021 Eisner Award for Best Academic/Scholarly Work. His theories on visual language provided the foundation for the creation of automatically generated news comics for the BBC.

Cohn's research has also examined the comprehension and linguistic status of emoji. He has also helped propose and design several emoji, and his work has been credited as the inspiration for Android’s Emoji Kitchen.

== Biography ==
Cohn began developing his theories as an undergraduate at UC Berkeley where he graduated in 2002. He then spent several years as an independent scholar before studying under linguist Ray Jackendoff and psychologists Gina Kuperberg and Phillip Holcomb at Tufts University where he received his PhD in psychology in 2012. He then did a postdoctoral fellowship at UC San Diego working with Marta Kutas and Jeff Elman. In 2016, he joined the faculty of the Tilburg center for Cognition and Communication at Tilburg University. He is the son of Leigh Cohn and Lindsey Hall.

== Visual language theory ==
Cohn’s work challenges many of the existing conceptions of both language and drawing. He argues that language involves an interaction between an expressive modality, meaning, and a grammar. Just as sign languages differ from gestures in that they use a vocabulary and grammar, “visual languages” differ from individual drawings because they have a vocabulary of patterned graphic representations and a grammar constraining the coherence of sequential images. Full visual languages primarily appear alongside written languages in comics of the world, though they also appear outside of comics, such as in sand drawings used by Australian Aboriginals. Just as spoken languages differ, so do visual languages: manga styled works are written in “Japanese Visual Language” while superhero styled comics are written in “American Visual Language.” In addition, Cohn has argued that the development of visual languages may follow similar constraints as learning spoken and signed languages, and that most people do not learn how to draw proficiently because they do not acquire visual vocabularies within a critical period.

Cohn's primary research program with visual language theory emphasizes that a narrative structure operates as a “grammar” to sequential images analogously to syntactic structure in sentences. While narrative grammar uses a discourse level of information, its function and structure is similar to syntax in that it organizes categorical roles in hierarchic constituents in order to express meaning. Cohn’s work in cognitive neuroscience has suggested that manipulation of this narrative grammar elicits similar brain responses as manipulations of syntax in language (i.e. N400, P600, and Left Anterior Negativity effects).

In 2020, Cohn was awarded a Starting Grant from the European Research Council for his "TINTIN Project" to study diversity in the structures of the visual languages used in comics around the world by building a multicultural corpus of annotated global comics, and to examine the relationship of those structures to those in spoken languages. In 2025, Cohn was then awarded a Consolidator Grant from the European Research Council for his “PICTREE Project” to study the hierarchic structure of single pictures and sequential images, and to explore whether grammars in language, music, and visual narratives share similar processing in the brain.

== Comic authorship ==
Cohn began working in the comic industry at age 14 by helping to run convention booths for Image Comics and Todd McFarlane Productions throughout his teenage years. Beyond illustrating his academic books, Cohn’s creative work appears in several graphic novels, like We the People: A Call to Take Back America (2004) with Thom Hartmann, and illustrations for academic works, including Ray Jackendoff’s A User’s Guide to Thought and Meaning (2012), and the comic strip “Chinese Room” with philosopher Daniel Dennett. His Speaking in Pictures (2026) combines his experience as a comic author and academic to present his research on language, cognition, and visual communication as a graphic novel.

=== Selected works ===
- Cohn, Neil (2003). Early Writings on Visual Language. Carlsbad, CA: Emaki Productions. p. 120. ISBN 978-0-615-19346-5.
- Hartmann, Thom & Cohn, Neil (2004). We the People: A Call to Take Back America. Portland, OR: CoreWay Media. pp. 220. ISBN 978-1882109388.
- Cohn, Neil (2013). The Visual Language of Comics: Introduction to the Structure and Cognition of Sequential Images. London, UK: Bloomsbury. p. 240. ISBN 9781441181459.
- Cohn, Neil, ed. (2016). The Visual Narrative Reader. London, UK: Bloomsbury. p. 320. ISBN 9781472585592.
- Cohn, Neil (2020). Who Understands Comics?: Questioning the Universality of Visual Language Comprehension. London, UK: Bloomsbury. p. 256. ISBN 978-1350156043.
- Cohn, Neil; Schilperoord, Joost (2024). A Multimodal Language Faculty: A Framework for Human Communication. London, UK: Bloomsbury. p. 352. ISBN 9781350402416.
- Cohn, Neil (2026). Speaking in Pictures: A Vision of Language. London, UK: Bloomsbury. p. 328. ISBN 9781350402188.
