= Snowball (cockatoo) =

Cockatoo capable of dancing

- Species: Eleonora cockatoo (Cacatua galerita eleonora)
- Sex: Male
- Hatched: 1996 (age 29–30)
- Nationality: United States
- Known for: Beat perception and synchronization
- Owner: Irena Schulz

Snowball (hatched c. 1996) is a male Eleonora cockatoo, noted as being the first non-human animal conclusively demonstrated to be capable of beat induction: perceiving music and synchronizing his body movements to the beat (i.e. dancing). He currently holds the Guinness World Record for most dance moves by a bird.

== Background ==
Snowball's abilities first became apparent after being acquired from a bird show at the age of six by his previous owner. He was observed bobbing his head in time to the Backstreet Boys song, "Everybody (Backstreet's Back)". The owner and his children encouraged this behavior and observed Snowball developing rhythmic foot-lifting gestures, perhaps in imitation of his human companions' arm-lifting gestures.

In August 2007, Snowball was relinquished by his previous owner (at least his third) to the Bird Lovers Only bird shelter of Duncan, South Carolina, after the cockatoo became "difficult to manage", following his daughter's departure to college. Shelter owner Irena Schulz was informed of the cockatoo's unusual ability and, after confirming this behavior at first hand, uploaded a video of Snowball's dancing, swaying, and head bobbing to her website. Some time later the video was uploaded to YouTube. The video became an Internet phenomenon, with over 200,000 views in one week and was featured on the television programs Inside Edition and The Morning Show with Mike and Juliet.

Snowball has also appeared in TV commercials, advertising Loka brand bottled water in Sweden in 2008 and in a Taco Bell advertisement in 2009, dancing to Rupert Holmes' "Escape (The Piña Colada Song)".

== Accomplishments ==
In 2008, the YouTube clip featuring Snowball was brought to the attention of Drs. Aniruddh D. Patel and John R. Iversen of the Neurosciences Institute in La Jolla, California. In an interview with The New York Times, Dr. Patel stated that his "jaw hit the floor" upon seeing the video, comparing the unlikely and contrary-to-accepted-wisdom nature of a cockatoo dancing to human music to that of a "dog reading a newspaper out loud". Between January and May 2008, Patel led research to determine whether or not Snowball was in fact truly synchronizing his body movements to the music (as opposed to simply mimicking or responding to visual clues from humans present in the room at the same time). Snowball's favorite piece of music was played to him at several different tempos and his reactions recorded on video for later analysis. The results, published in the paper "Investigating the human-specificity of synchronization to music" showed that Snowball was capable of spontaneously dancing to human music and also that he could adjust his movements to match the tempo of the music (albeit to a limited extent), a behavior previously thought only to occur in humans. This ability is believed to be unrelated to the male Eleonora cockatoo's natural courtship display, which is described as "simple and brief" and involves strutting towards the female with crest raised, whilst bobbing and swishing his head in a figure-eight movement and "uttering soft, chattering notes all the while".

Adena Schachner and other scientists at Harvard University have also studied Snowball and reached conclusions which, broadly, endorse those of Dr. Patel. Schachner also identified that Alex, a grey parrot famed for his intelligent use of language may have also shared the ability to dance, in addition to 33 other clips on YouTube showing animals moving in time to music. Patel has suggested that the capability of both humans and cockatoos to move synchronously to a rhythmic beat may be a "byproduct of a link between the auditory and motor parts of the brain" as a result of both species' ability to learn and mimic sounds.

In May 2009, Patel and Schulz announced the beginning of a new study, using the Billy Idol song "Dancing with Myself", which was intended to explore what role human interaction plays in Snowball's ability to dance.

In 2019, Patel published further research which indicated that Snowball demonstrated 14 different dance moves, some of which may have been copied from the humans around him and some spontaneously improvised. The paper concluded that Snowball most likely dances to the music for social reasons and is not motivated by food or mating behaviour.

== See also ==
- Bird intelligence
- List of individual birds
- Ronan (sea lion)
