= Mentalist postulate =

Semantics concept

The mentalist postulate is the thesis that meaning in natural language is an information structure that is mentally encoded by human beings. It is a basic premise of some branches of cognitive semantics. Semantic theories implicitly or explicitly incorporating the mentalist postulate include force dynamics and conceptual semantics.

Two implications of the mentalist postulate are: first, that research on the nature of mental representations can serve to constrain or enrich semantic theories; and secondly, that results of semantic theories bear directly on the nature of human conceptualization.
