= Center for Cognitive Studies =

Research unit at Tufts University

The Center for Cognitive Studies at Tufts University is a research unit for various research projects in cognitive studies. Daniel Dennett and Ray Jackendoff were Co-Directors.
