= Huck Hodge =

American classical composer

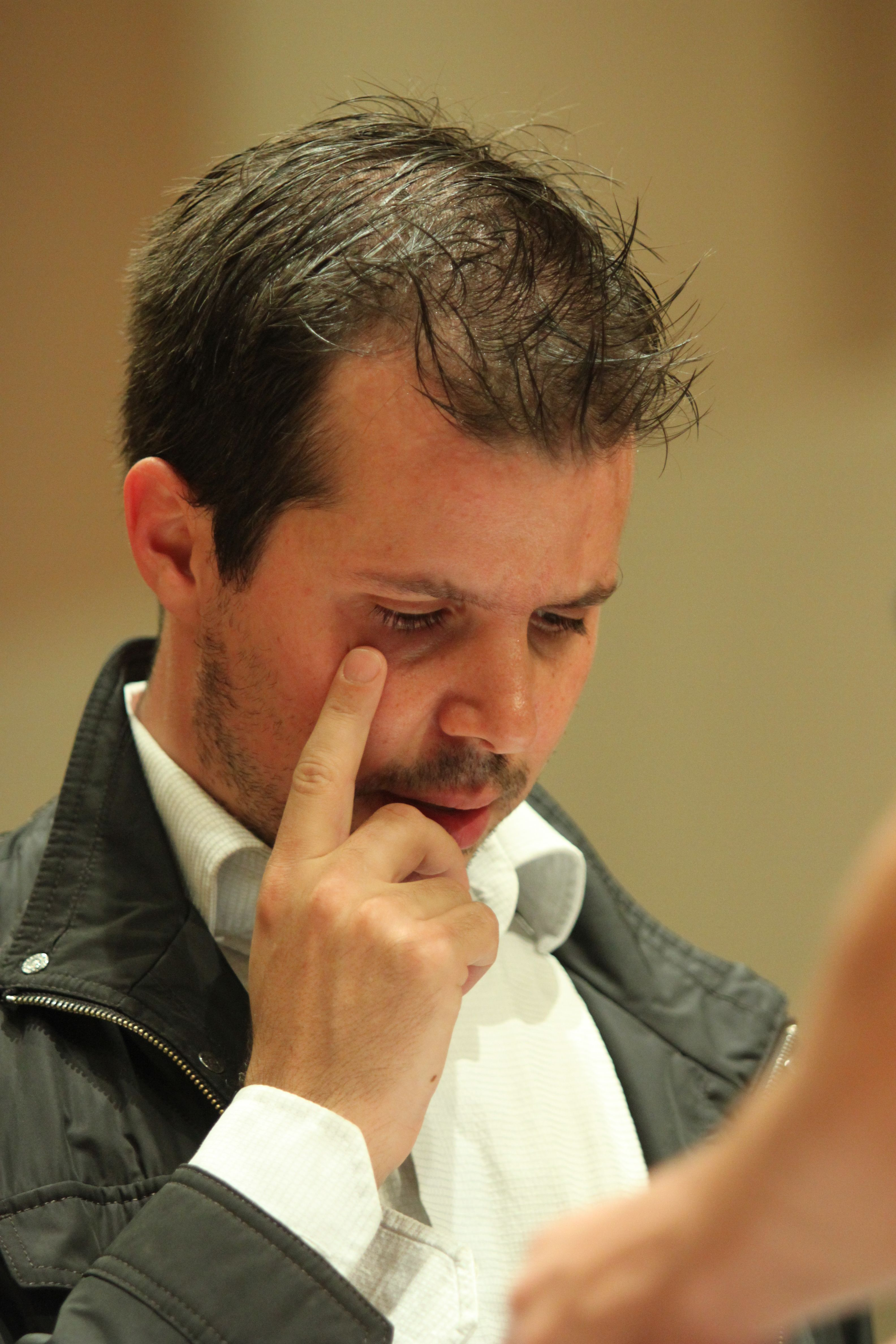
- Huck Hodge at the Gaudeamus Muziekweek
- Born: July 14, 1977 (age 48); Gainesville, Florida, U.S.
- Era: Contemporary

Huck Hodge (born July 14, 1977) is an American composer of contemporary classical music.

Hodge's first musical training took place in Oregon. In 1999, he began a course of study in Germany at the Staatliche Hochschule für Musik und Darstellende Kunst in Stuttgart with funding from the Deutscher Akademischer Austauschdienst. Between 2002 and 2008, he was an Andrew W. Mellon Foundation Fellow at Columbia University where he studied composition under Tristan Murail and Fred Lerdahl. Hodge graduated with MA and DMA degrees from Columbia.

Hodge is the winner of the Charles Ives Living, awarded by the American Academy of Arts and Letters in 2018, a 2012 Guggenheim Fellowship, the 2010–11 Rome Prize, the 2008 Gaudeamus Prize, commissions from the Fromm and Koussevitzky Music Foundations, and the Aaron Copland Residency Award from the Aaron Copland House. He is professor and chair of music composition at the University of Washington, Seattle.

== Compositional style ==
Two salient elements in Hodge's music are the incorporation of timbre as an integral form-bearing compositional device and an approach to musical structure that emphasizes gradual change over time. As such, his music bears traces of American Minimalism and Franco-European Spectralism, though Jonathan Bernard questions this ascription, pointing out that his music is somewhat iconoclastic in its reliance on philosophical ideas as the impetus and justification for its materials and structures.

His music is also characterized by its incorporation of techniques drawn from electroacoustic composition, its response to light patterns found in nature, and its approach to dialogue with the music of previous centuries.

== Catalog of works ==
- Toccata for piano solo (1998)
- Concerto for Cello and Chamber Orchestra (1999)
- Widerspiegelung | Mirror Image (2000): for tenor saxophone and piano.
- Zeremonie (2001): for computerized sound
- AntEroica (2001): for piano, live electronics and video projection.
- Kandinsky Studies (2001): for computer-synthesized sound (programmed in C Sound).
- String Quintet (2001)
- Zeremonie (2002): version for large ensemble, computerized sound and dance. In collaboration with the NYU New Music and Dance Ensemble.
- The Awakeneing (2002): for full orchestra.
- De Nativitate (2003): for piano quintet.
- Between Light and Shade (2003): for flute, cello and percussion trio.
- Seeds of Fire (2003): for piano and computerized sound.
- Early Lyrics (2004): for chamber ensemble (Sop, Fl, Cl/Bcl, Vln, Vcl, Pno and Electronics).
- Psalm XIII (2004): for SSAATTB choir.
- . . .como un respiro (2005): for solo cello and eleven strings.
- Parallaxes (2005): for Chamber Orchestra.
- Out of a Dark Sea (2006): for chamber ensemble (Fl/Alto Fl, Cl/Bcl, Hrn, Perc, Harp, Pno, Vln, Vcl and Electronics). Commissioned by The Stony Brook Contemporary Chamber Players, ((Gilbert Kalish)), Director, as part of the
  19th Annual World Premieres Commission Series
- Phantasie (2006): for amplified cello. Commissioned by Musik der Jahrhunderte for cellist Adrian Fung as part of the ISCM World New Music Festival, 2006.
- Remix-Asyla (2006): for large ensemble. In collaboration with members of Ensemble Modern and the Berlin Philharmonic.
- A Distant Mirror (2006): for bass clarinet/clarinet and piano.
- Efflux (2007): for clarinet and violin.
- In Lumine (2007): for SATB choir.
- Two Preludes (2007): for harp solo.
- Apparent Motion (2008) for 2 pianos and 2 percussion.
- String Quartet (2008): commissioned by the American Composers Forum with funding from the Jerome Foundation.
- Transfigured Etudes (2009): for piano solo; written for the 2010 ISCM World New Music Days, Sydney, Australia.
- Alêtheia (2010/11): for large chamber ensemble. Commissioned Muziek Centrum Nederland for the Ensemble Aleph and Ensemble Insomnio as part of the Laboratoire Instrumental Europeén.
- from the language of shadows (2010/11): for symphonic wind ensemble, 2 amplified pianos, 3 amplified Contrabasses and silent film. 24-member CBDNA consortium commission.
- I think that the Root of the Wind is Water (2011): for computer-realized sound. Commissioned by the American Academy in Rome.
- pools of shadow from an older sky (2011): for live-processed bent Piano, computer-realized sound and video projection in collaboration with video artist Karen Yasinsky. Commissioned by the American Academy in Rome.
- Départ (2011): for violin solo. Written as part of a musical Festschrift for Tristan Murail.
- Tetzahuitl (2012): for chamber orchestra. Written for the Talea Ensemble / Contempuls Festival (Prague).
- re((f)use) (2012): for live-processed melodica, amplified string quartet and electronics. Commissioned by Music at the Anthology.
- Time is the substance I am made of (2013): for 32 singers, computer-realized sound, video, choreography and lighting design; commissioned by the National Concert Hall of Taiwan for the Taipei Chamber Singers.
- Apophenia (2014): for large mixed chamber ensemble and dancers. Commissioned by the Barlow Endowment and the Rondó Festival with funding from the Ernst von Siemens Musikstiftung.
- Unicinium (2014): for microtonal (19-division) trumpet, written for Stephen Altoft.
- pulse – cut – seethe – blur (2015): for chamber orchestra; commissioned by the Seattle Symphony, premiere October 23, 2015.
- The Topography of Desire (2016): for string quartet; commissioned by Harvard's Fromm Foundation, premiere April 29, 2016 by the Daedalus Quartet at University of Washington, Meany Hall.
- At dawn I chant my own weird hymn (2017): for solo offstage trumpet, symphonic wind and percussion ensemble, 2 amplified harps, 2 amplified pianos, and 3 amplified contrabasses.
- mi'ma'amakin (2018): for organ.
- Innigkeit (nach außen) (2018): for clarinet solo.
- Fracture (2019): for percussion and piano.
- Time is the substance I am made of (2019): for large mixed chorus and electronics.
- The Shape of the Wind, the Shadow of Time (2020): concerto for percussion soloist, tape recorders, sheet metal, styrofoam and sinfonietta; commissioned by the Koussevitzky Music Foundation at the Library of Congress.
- The simple and unvarying geometry of breaths (2020): for chamber ensemble (Vln, Alto Sax, Piano, 2 guitars and contrabass).
- Time and its arbitrary measurements (2020): for mixed chamber ensemble (Fl, Cl, Hrp, Pno, Perc, Vln, Vcl)
