= Levels of adequacy =

In his work Aspects of the Theory of Syntax (1965), Noam Chomsky introduces a hierarchy of levels of adequacy for evaluating grammars (theories of specific languages) and metagrammars (theories of grammars).

These levels constitute a taxonomy of theories (a grammar of a natural language being an example of such a theory) according to validation. This taxonomy might be extended to scientific theories in general, and from there even stretched into the field of the aesthetics of art. This present article's use of the phrase as a terminus technicus should not be confused with its everyday language uses.

== Motivation ==
The "potency" criterion alluded to in the preceding section is somewhat ill-defined, but may include "exhaustiveness", "effectiveness', and an affective component as well. (Arguably, the taxonomy is also motivated by considerations of "elegance". This should not be confused with the application of the taxonomy in the field of aesthetics). As a metatheory, or "theory of theories", it becomes a concept of epistemology in the philosophy of science, rather than a mere tool or methodology of scientific linguistics. As Chomsky put it in an earlier work:

The theory of linguistic structure must be distinguished clearly from a manual of helpful procedures for the discovery of grammars.

== The levels ==
1. Observational adequacy
  - The theory achieves an exhaustive and discrete enumeration of the data points.
  - There is a pigeonhole for each observation.
2. Descriptive adequacy
  - The theory formally specifies rules accounting for all observed arrangements of the data.
  - The rules produce all and only the well-formed constructs (relations) of the protocol space.
  ...the grammar gives a correct account of the linguistic intuition of the native speaker, and specifies the observed data (in particular) in terms of significant generalizations that express underlying regularities in the language.
3. Explanatory adequacy
  - The theory provides a principled choice between competing descriptions.
  - It deals with the uttermost underlying structure.
  - It has predictive power.
  A linguistic theory that aims for explanatory adequacy is concerned with the internal structure of the device [i.e. grammar]; that is, it aims to provide a principled basis, independent of any particular language, for the selection of the descriptively adequate grammar of each language.

Theories which do not achieve the third level of adequacy are said to "account for the observations", rather than to "explain the observations."

The second and third levels include the assumption of Ockhamist parsimony. This is related to the Minimalist requirement, which is elaborated as a corollary of the levels, but which is actually employed as an axiom.

== Precursors in the philosophy of science ==
It is suggested that the system of levels proposed by Chomsky in Aspects of the Theory of Syntax has its antecedents in the works of Descartes, Kant, Carnap, Quine, and others. Certainly the criterion of adequacy found in rationalism, specifically, rational empiricism, bear some resemblance to Chomsky's formulation.

Since one of the key issues which Chomsky treats in Aspects is a supposition of a congenital endowment of the language faculty in humans, the topic ramifies into questions of innateness and a priori knowledge, since it is by reference to those questions that the third level of adequacy is to be sought.

== Note ==
This concept should not be confused with the "causal adequacy principle," which refers to Descartes' version of the ontological argument for the existence of God in his Meditations on First Philosophy.

== Bibliography ==
- Chomsky, Noam. 1957. Syntactic Structures. The Hague: Mouton.
- Chomsky, Noam. 1964. "Current Issues in Linguistic Theory", in Fodor, J. A. and J. J. Katz (eds.), The Structure of Language: Readings in the Philosophy of Language, Englewood Cliffs, Prentice Hall: 50-118.
- Chomsky, Noam. 1965. Aspects of the Theory of Syntax. Cambridge, Massachusetts MIT Press.
- Chomsky, Noam. 1995. The Minimalist Program. Cambridge, Massachusetts: MIT Press.
- Chomsky, Noam. 2000. New Horizons in the Study of Language and Mind. Cambridge: Cambridge University Press.
