= Richard Parncutt =

Australian-born academic (born 1957)

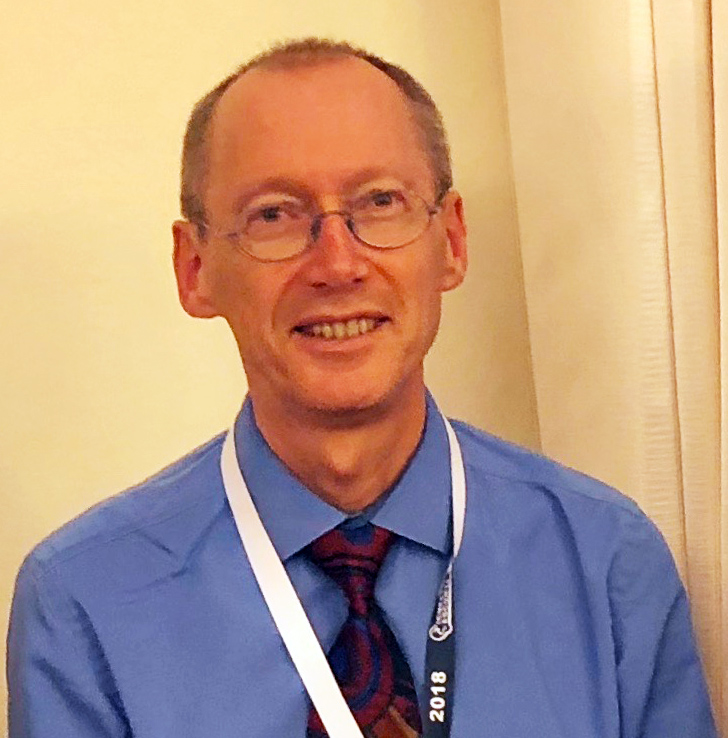
- Parncutt in 2018
- Born: 24 October 1957 (age 68); Melbourne, Australia
- Known for: research on music psychology

Richard Parncutt (born 24 October 1957) is an Australian academic. He has been professor of systematic musicology at Karl Franzens University Graz in Austria since 1998.

== Education ==
Parncutt studied music and physics at the University of Melbourne, and physics at the University of New England, Australia. In 1987 he was awarded a PhD from the University of New England. From 1996 to 1998 he held a position as a lecturer in psychology at Keele University, UK.

== Research ==
Parncutt's research addresses the perception of musical structure (pitch, consonance, harmony, tonality, tension, rhythm, metre, accent), the psychology of music performance (especially piano performance), and the psychological origins of tonality. He has been publishing research since 1984. He proposed the "psychoacoustic model of harmony" in 1989.

His 2002 edited volume with Gary E. McPherson was called a "great service to the profession... not only an inspiration for daily teaching, but it is also a concise resource for information on nearly every aspect of music research." His 2024 book on major–minor tonality was favourably reviewed in Empirical Musicology Review, which said he "addresses broader cultural and philosophical issues, thus offering a novel approach to understanding the universality and specificity of MmT."

=== Interdisciplinarity ===
Since 2008 Parncutt has directed the Centre for Systematic Musicology at the University of Graz. In 2004 he founded the series Conference in Interdisciplinary Musicology, and in 2008 he became founding academic editor of the Journal of Interdisciplinary Music Studies. Parncutt established the antiracist series Conference on Applied Interculturality Research in 2010. The conference is inspired by the Conference on Interdisciplinary Musicology and is organised on similar lines.

== Publications ==
- Parncutt, Richard (2024). Psychoacoustic Foundations of Major-Minor Tonality. MIT Press. ISBN 9780262377362.
- Parncutt, Richard; McPherson, Gary, eds. (18 April 2002). The Science and Psychology of Music Performance: Creative Strategies for Teaching and Learning. Oxford University Press. ISBN 9780199849291.
- Parncutt, Richard (1989). Harmony: A Psychoacoustical Approach. Berlin: Springer Verlag. ISBN 978-3-642-74833-2.
