= Music Perception =

- Discipline: Music, Psychology
- Language: English
- Edited by: Catherine (Kate) J. Stevens

Publication details
- History: 1983-present
- Publisher: University of California Press (United States)
- Frequency: 5/year
- Impact factor: 1.152 (2018)

Standard abbreviations
- ISO 4: Music Percept.

Indexing
- ISSN: 0730-7829 (print); 1533-8312 (web)
- LCCN: 84644031
- JSTOR: 07307829
- OCLC no.: 645293324

Links
- Journal homepage

Music Perception: An Interdisciplinary Journal is a peer-reviewed academic journal published by University of California Press five times a year. It was founded by Diana Deutsch.

According to the Journal Citation Reports, the journal has a 2018 impact factor of 1.152.

== Succession of editors ==
- Diana Deutsch, Founding Editor
- Jamshed Bharucha
- Robert Gjerdingen
- Lola Cuddy
- Catherine (Kate) J. Stevens
