= Music acquisition =

Music acquisition is the process by which people acquire an understanding of music. Research shows that the definition or attributes used for expression through language can also be used for expression through music or musical instruments

The study of music acquisition is heavily related to the concept of language acquisition, gaining the ability to perceive and comprehend a language over time. Language acquisition also includes the use and production of language as a form of expression.
