= Musicae Scientiae (journal) =

- Discipline: Music psychology
- Language: English
- Edited by: Jane Ginsborg

Publication details
- History: 1997–present
- Publisher: SAGE Publications on behalf of the European Society for the Cognitive Sciences of Music
- Frequency: Quarterly
- Impact factor: 1.93 (2020)

Standard abbreviations
- ISO 4: Music. Sci.

Indexing
- ISSN: 1029-8649 (print); 2045-4147 (web)
- LCCN: sn98052141
- OCLC no.: 463081059

Links
- Journal homepage; Online access; Online archive

Musicæ Scientiæ is a quarterly peer-reviewed academic journal covering the field of music psychology. The editor-in-chief is Jane Ginsborg (Royal Northern College of Music). It was established 1997 and is published by SAGE Publications on behalf of the European Society for the Cognitive Sciences of Music.

== Abstracting and indexing ==
The journal is abstracted and indexed in the Arts and Humanities Citation Index, Current Contents/Arts & Humanities, Current Contents/Social & Behavioral Sciences, and the Social Sciences Citation Index. According to the Journal Citation Reports, the journal has a 2018 impact factor of 1.25
