= Fred Lerdahl =

American music theorist and composer (born 1943)

Alfred Whitford (Fred) Lerdahl (born March 10, 1943) is an American music theorist and composer. Best known for his work on musical grammar, cognition, rhythmic theory, and pitch space, he and the linguist Ray Jackendoff developed the Chomsky-inspired generative theory of tonal music.

Lerdahl has written numerous orchestral and chamber works, three of which were finalists for the Pulitzer Prize for Music: Time after Time in 2001, String Quartet No. 3 in 2010, and Arches in 2011. He is a Professor Emeritus of Musical Composition at Columbia University.

== Life ==
Alfred Whitford "Fred" Lerdahl was born on March 10, 1943, in Madison, Wisconsin. His maternal uncle was the astronomer Albert Whitford.

Lerdahl studied with James Ming at Lawrence University, where he earned his BMus in 1965, and with Milton Babbitt, Edward T. Cone, and Earl Kim at Princeton University, where he earned his MFA in 1967. At Tanglewood he studied with Arthur Berger in 1964 and Roger Sessions in 1966. He then studied with Wolfgang Fortner at the Hochschule für Musik in Freiburg/Breisgau in 1968–69, on a Fulbright Scholarship. From 1991 to 2018 Lerdahl was Fritz Reiner Professor of Musical Composition at Columbia University; before that, he taught at the University of Michigan, Harvard University, and the University of California at Berkeley. Lerdahl was awarded an honorary doctorate from Lawrence University in 1999. He is a member of the American Academy of Arts and Letters.

Example of Lerdahl and Jackendoff's tree structure analysis of tonal hierarchy (theme of Mozart's Sonata in A major K. 331)

Lerdahl has written three books: A Generative Theory of Tonal Music (1983, second edition 1996, with linguist Ray Jackendoff, MIT Press), Tonal Pitch Space (2001, Oxford University Press), and Composition and Cognition (2019, University of California Press). He has also written numerous articles on music theory, music cognition, computer-assisted composition, and other topics.

Lerdahl's music is published by Schott, and Bridge Records is producing an ongoing series of recordings of it. Lerdahl's students include composers Christopher Buchenholz, Zosha Di Castri, R. Luke DuBois, John Halle, Huck Hodge, Arthur Kampela, Alex Mincek, Paul Moravec, Matthew Ricketts, Allen Shearer, Kate Soper, Tyshawn Sorey, Christopher Trapani, Carl Voss, Wang Lu, Eric Wubbels, and Nina C. Young; and music theorists Elizabeth Margulis and David Temperley.

== Music ==
Lerdahl's influences include the German classics, Sibelius, Schoenberg, Bartók, Stravinsky, Carter, Messiaen, and Ligeti. He has said he "always sought musical forms of [his] own invention", and to discover the appropriate form for the intended expression. In Fanfare, Robert Carl wrote: "Lerdahl is a profoundly musical composer, engaged in all his work in a rigorous and respectful dialogue with tradition, eager to imbue his pieces with the maximum of both information and clarity." Of Lerdahl's composition Waves, Phillip Scott wrote, "Waves is an orchestral scherzo. It conjures up (rather than depicts) the motion and the sense of waves, not merely of the oceanic variety but also those found on graphs: sound waves, heartbeats, and so on. It begins with a surge of activity and never lets up in its cascading scales and rapid figuration. Unlike Debussy's La mer, whose deep-sea swells it recalls only fleetingly, it has no moments of repose."

== List of compositions ==
=== Orchestral ===
- Chords, large orchestra (12 winds, 11 brass, harp, piano, percussion, violas, cellos, double basses), 1974–83
- Cross-Currents, large orchestra (12 winds, 10 brass, harp, piano, percussion, strings), 1987
- Waves, small orchestra (8 winds, 2 French horns, strings), 1988
- Without Fanfare, small orchestra (12 winds, 11 brass, 3 percussion), 1994
- Quiet Music, large orchestra (12 winds, 11 brass, harp, piano, percussion, strings), 1994 (also version for 2 pianos)
- Spirals, orchestra (8 winds, 2 French horns, 2 trumpets, piano, percussion, strings), 2006
- Arches, cello, small orchestra (22 players), 2011
- Time and Again, small orchestra, 2014

=== Chamber music ===
- String Trio, violin, viola, cello, 1966
- Imitations, flute, harp, viola, 1977, revised 2001
- String Quartet No. 1, 1978, revised 2008
- Waltzes, violin, viola, cello, double bass, 1981
- Episodes and Refrains, flute, oboe, clarinet, French horn, bassoon, 1982
- Fantasy Etudes, flute, clarinet, violin, cello, piano, percussion, 1985
- Marches, clarinet, violin, cello, piano, 1992
- Time after Time, flute, clarinet, violin, cello, piano, percussion, 2000
- Imbrications, flute, clarinet, violin, cello, piano, percussion, 2001
- Oboe Quartet, oboe, violin, viola, cello, 2002
- Duo, violin, piano, 2005
- String Quartet No. 2, 1982–2010
- String Quartet No. 3, 2008
- Arches, cello, ensemble (flute, oboe, clarinet, bassoon, French horn, trumpet, trombone, harp, 2 violins, viola, double bass, piano, 2 percussion), 2010 (also version for cello, small orchestra [22 players])
- There and Back Again, cello, 2010
- Times 3, violin, cello, piano, 2012
- Give and Take, violin, cello, 2014
- String Quartet no. 4 "Chaconne", 2016
- Three Bagatelles, violin, guitar, 2016
- Duo, cello, piano, 2017
- Chords, version for 13 instruments, 2018
- Cyclic Descent, piano and large ensemble, 2018
- Reflection, flute, clarinet, piano, 2020

=== Choral ===
- Cornstalks (text by Richard Wilbur), 16 mixed voices, 2012

=== Vocal ===
- Wake (text by James Joyce), soprano, harp, violin, viola, cello, 3 percussion, 1967–68
- Aftermath (dramatic cantata, text by the composer), soprano, alto, baritone, 2 flutes, 2 oboes, 2 clarinets, 2 bassoons, harp, 2 violins, viola, cello, double bass), 1973
- Eros (text by Ezra Pound), mezzo-soprano, alto flute, harp, electric guitar, viola, bass guitar, piano, 2 percussion, 1975
- Beyond the Realm of Bird (text by Emily Dickinson), soprano, orchestra (8 winds, French horn, trumpet, trombone, harp, piano, percussion, strings), 1984
- The First Voices (text by Jean-Jacques Rousseau, translated by John H. Moran and Alexander Gode), soprano, mezzo-soprano, alto, 8 percussion, 2007
- Fire and Ice (text by Robert Frost), high soprano, double bass, 2015

=== Piano ===
- Piano Fantasy, 1964
- Quiet Music, two pianos, 2001 (version of orchestral work)
- Three Diatonic Studies, 2004–09
- Inner Life, two pianos, 2022

== Discography ==
- String Quartet No. 1 (original version). Juilliard String Quartet (Composers Recordings, Inc.: CRI 551, 1987 [reissued as New World Records: NWCR551, 2007])
- Waltzes; Fantasy Etudes; Eros; Wake. Bethany Beardslee, soprano; Beverly Morgan, mezzo-soprano; Rolf Schulte, violin; Scott Nickrenz, viola; Fred Sherry, cello; Donald Palma, double bass; Robert Beaser/Musical Elements; David Epstein/Boston Symphony Chamber Players; Fred Lerdahl/Collage (Composers Recordings, Inc.: CRI 580, 1991 [reissued as New World Records: NWCR580, 2007; Bridge Records: 9269; Bridge Records: 9391; and New World Records: NWCRL378])
- Waves. Orpheus Chamber Orchestra (Deutsche Grammophon: 435 389–2, 1992, reissued as Bridge Records: 9191)
- Fantasy Etudes. eighth blackbird (eighth blackbird, 1999)
- Time after Time; Marches; Oboe Quartet; Waves. Antares; La Fenice; Jeffrey Milarsky/Columbia Sinfonietta; Orpheus Chamber Orchestra (Bridge Records: 9191, 2006, reissue of Deutsche Grammophon: 435 389-2)
- Cross-Currents; Waltzes; Duo; Quiet Music (original version). Rolf Schulte, violin; Scott Nickrenz, viola; Fred Sherry, cello; Donald Palma, double bass; James Winn, piano; Paul Mann/Odense Symphony (Bridge Records: 9269, 2008 [partial reissue of Composers Recordings, Inc.: CRI 580, New World Records: NWCR580])
- String Trio; Piano Fantasy. Robert Miller, piano; members of The Composers Quartet (New World Records: NWCRL319, c. 2009)
- String Quartets Nos. 1–3. Daedalus Quartet (Bridge Records: 9352, 2011)
- The First Voices. Frank Epstein/New England Conservatory Percussion Ensemble (Naxos Records: 8.559684, 2011)
- Eros. Beverly Morgan, mezzo-soprano; Fred Lerdahl/Collage (New World Records: NWCRL378, 2011, reissue of Composers Recordings, Inc.: CRI 580)
- Spirals; Three Diatonic Studies; Imbrications; Wake; Fantasy Etudes. Bethany Beardslee, soprano; Mirka Viitala, piano; eighth blackbird; Michel Galante/Argento Ensemble; David Epstein/Boston Symphony Chamber Players; Scott Yoo/Odense Symphony (Bridge Records: 9391, 2013, reissue of Composers Recordings, Inc.: CRI 580, New World Records: NWCR580)
- There and Back Again. Anssi Karttunen, cello (Toccata Classics: TOCC0171, 2013)
- There and Back Again, String Quartet no. 4 "Chaconne", Fire and Ice, Three Bagatelles, Arches (orchestral version). (Bridge Records: 9522, 2020)

== Awards ==
- 1966, Koussevitzky Composition Prize
- 1967, MacDowell Colony Fellowship
- 1971, 1988 Composer Award from the American Academy of Arts and Letters
- 1974, Guggenheim Fellowship
- 1977, Naumburg Recording Award
- 1982, Martha Baird Rockefeller Recording Award
- 1991, National Endowment for the Humanities Fellowship
- 1999, Doctor of Fine Arts (honorary degree), Lawrence University
- 2001, Finalist, Pulitzer Prize for Music (for Time after Time)
- 2002, ASCAP-Deems Taylor Special Recognition Award (for Tonal Pitch Space)
- 2003, Wallace Berry Distinguished Book Award (for Tonal Pitch Space)
- 2010, Finalist, Pulitzer Prize for Music (for String Quartet No. 3)
- 2010, Member, American Academy for Arts and Letters
- 2011, Finalist, Pulitzer Prize for Music (for Arches)

== Bibliography ==
- Lerdahl, Fred (1992). Cognitive Constraints on Compositional Systems, Contemporary Music Review 6 (2), pp. 97–121.
- Lerdahl, Fred and Jackendoff, Ray (1983). A Generative Theory of Tonal Music. MIT Press. ISBN 0-262-62107-X.
- Lerdahl, Fred (2001). Tonal Pitch Space. Oxford University Press. ISBN 0-19-505834-8
- Lerdahl, Fred (2019). Composition and Cognition: Reflections on Contemporary Music and the Musical Mind. University of California Press. ISBN 978-0-520-30510-6

== See also ==
- Music cognition
- Generative theory of tonal music
