= Ray Jackendoff =

American linguist and philosopher (born 1945)

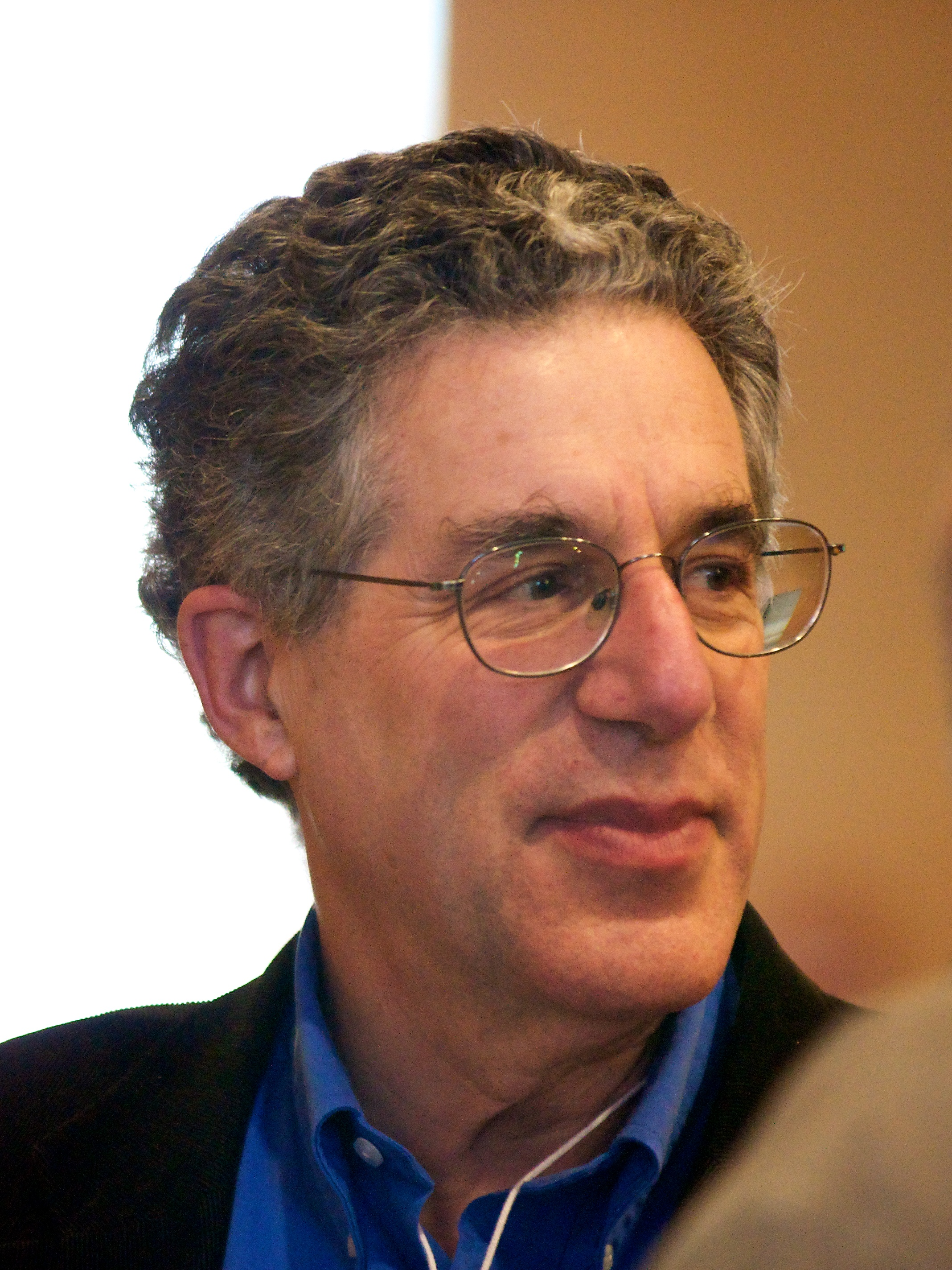
- Born: January 23, 1945 (age 81)
- Education: MIT, Swarthmore
- Awards: Fellow of the AAAS; Jean Nicod Prize (2003); Rumelhart Prize (2014)
- Scientific career
- Fields: Generative grammar, cognitive science, music cognition
- Workplaces: Tufts, Brandeis
- Doctoral advisor: Noam Chomsky
- Notable students: Neil Cohn

Ray Jackendoff (born January 23, 1945) is an American linguist. He is professor of philosophy, Seth Merrin Chair in the Humanities and was, with Daniel Dennett, co-director of the Center for Cognitive Studies at Tufts University. His work straddles the boundary between generative linguistics and cognitive linguistics, committed to both the existence of an innate universal grammar (an important thesis of generative linguistics) and to giving an account of language that is consistent with the current understanding of the human mind and cognition (the main purpose of cognitive linguistics).

Jackendoff's research deals with the semantics of natural language, its bearing on the formal structure of cognition, and its lexical and syntactic expression. He has conducted extensive research on the relationship between conscious awareness and the computational theory of mind, on syntactic theory, and, with Fred Lerdahl, on musical cognition, culminating in their generative theory of tonal music. His theory of conceptual semantics developed into a comprehensive theory on the foundations of language, which indeed is the title of a monograph (2002): Foundations of Language. Brain, Meaning, Grammar, Evolution. In his 1983 Semantics and Cognition, he was one of the first linguists to integrate the visual faculty into his account of meaning and human language.

Jackendoff studied under linguists Noam Chomsky and Morris Halle at the Massachusetts Institute of Technology, where he received his PhD in linguistics in 1969. Before moving to Tufts in 2005, Jackendoff was professor of linguistics and chair of the linguistics program at Brandeis University from 1971 to 2005. During the 2009 spring semester, he was an external professor at the Santa Fe Institute. Jackendoff was awarded the Jean Nicod Prize in 2003. He received the 2014 David E. Rumelhart Prize. He has also been granted honorary degrees by the Université du Québec à Montréal (2010), the National Music University of Bucharest (2011), the Music Academy of Cluj-Napoca (2011), the Ohio State University (2012), and Tel Aviv University (2013).

== Interfaces and generative grammar ==
Jackendoff argues against a syntax-centered view of generative grammar (which he calls syntactocentrism), at variance with earlier models such as the standard theory (1968), the extended standard theory (1972), the revised extended standard theory (1975), the government and binding theory (1981), and the minimalist program (1993), in which syntax is the sole generative component in the language. Jackendoff takes syntax, semantics, and phonology all to be generative, interconnected via interface components. The task of his theory is to formalize the proper interface rules.

While rejecting mainstream generative grammar due to its syntactocentrism, the cognitive semantics school has offered an insight that Jackendoff would sympathize with, namely, that meaning is a separate combinatorial system not entirely dependent upon syntax. Unlike many of the cognitive semantics approaches, he contends that neither syntax alone should determine semantics, nor vice versa. Syntax need only interface with semantics to the degree necessary to produce properly ordered phonological output (see Jackendoff 1996, 2002; Culicover & Jackendoff 2005).

== Contribution to musical cognition ==
Jackendoff, together with Fred Lerdahl, has been interested in the human capacity for music and its relationship to the human capacity for language. In particular, music has structure as well as a "grammar" (a means by which sounds are combined into structures). When a listener hears music in an idiom he or she is familiar with, the music is not merely heard as a stream of sounds; rather, the listener constructs an unconscious understanding of the music and is able to understand pieces of music never heard previously. Jackendoff is interested in what cognitive structures or "mental representations" this understanding consists of in the listener's mind, how a listener comes to acquire the musical grammar necessary to understand a particular musical idiom, what innate resources in the human mind make this acquisition possible and, finally, what parts of the human music capacity are governed by general cognitive functions and what parts result from specialized functions geared specifically for music (Jackendoff & Lerdahl, 1983; Lerdahl, 2001). Similar questions have also been raised regarding human language, although there are differences. For instance, it is more likely that humans evolved a specialized language module than having evolved one for music, since even the specialized aspects of music comprehension are tied to more general cognitive functions.

== Selected works ==
- Jackendoff, Ray (1972). Semantic Interpretation in Generative Grammar. Cambridge, Massachusetts: MIT Press. pp. 400. ISBN 0-262-10013-4.
- Jackendoff, Ray (1977). X-Bar Syntax: A Study of Phrase Structure. Cambridge, Massachusetts: MIT Press. pp. 248. ISBN 0-262-10018-5.
- Jackendoff, Ray (1983). Semantics and Cognition. Cambridge, Massachusetts: MIT Press. pp. 283. ISBN 0-262-10027-4.
- Lerdahl, Fred; Ray Jackendoff (1983). A Generative Theory of Tonal Music. Cambridge, Massachusetts: MIT Press. pp. 369. ISBN 0-262-12094-1.
- Jackendoff, Ray (1987). Consciousness and the Computational Mind. Cambridge, Massachusetts: MIT Press. pp. 356. ISBN 0-262-10037-1.
- Jackendoff, Ray (1990). Semantic Structures. Cambridge, Massachusetts: MIT Press. pp. 322. ISBN 0-262-10043-6.
- Jackendoff, Ray (1992). Languages of the Mind: Essays on Mental Representation. Cambridge, Massachusetts: MIT Press. p. 200. ISBN 0-262-10047-9.
- Jackendoff, Ray (1993). Patterns in the Mind: Language and Human Nature. New York, NY: Harvester Wheatsheaf. p. 243. ISBN 0-7450-0962-X.
- Jackendoff, Ray (1997). The Architecture of the Language Faculty. Cambridge, Massachusetts: MIT Press. pp. 262. ISBN 0-262-10059-2.
- Jackendoff, Ray (2002). Foundations of Language: Brain, Meaning, Grammar, Evolution. Oxford: Oxford University Press. p. 477. ISBN 0-19-827012-7.
- Culicover, Peter W.; Ray Jackendoff (2005). Simpler syntax. Oxford: Oxford University Press. p. 589. ISBN 0-19-927108-9.
- Jackendoff, Ray (2007). Language, Consciousness, Culture: Essays on Mental Structure (Jean Nicod Lectures). Cambridge, Massachusetts: MIT Press. pp. 403. ISBN 978-0-262-10119-6.
- Jackendoff, Ray (2010). Meaning and the Lexicon: The Parallel Architecture 1975–2010. Oxford: Oxford University Press. p. 504. ISBN 978-0-19-956888-8.
- Jackendoff, Ray (2012). A User's Guide to Thought and Meaning. Oxford: Oxford University Press. p. 274. ISBN 978-0-19-969320-7.

== See also ==
- Conceptual semantics
- Mentalist postulate
- List of Jean Nicod Prize laureates
- X-bar theory
