= HCS =

HCS may refer to:

== Education ==
Various countries

- Heritage Christian School (disambiguation)
- Holy Cross School (disambiguation)

Australia

- Hallett Cove School, in Adelaide, South Australia
- Heritage College Sydney, in New South Wales

India

- Hooghly Collegiate School, in West Bengal

United Kingdom

- Hereford Cathedral School, in England
- Hull Collegiate School, in England

United States

- Hackensack Christian School, in New Jersey
- Hampshire Country School, in New Hampshire
- Hampton Christian Schools, in Virginia
- Hardin County Schools, in Kentucky
- Harrisburg Christian School, in Pennsylvania
- Hawkins County Schools in Tennessee
- Highland Catholic School, in Minnesota
- Hilltop Christian School, in North Carolina
- Hinsdale Central School, in New York
- Holland Christian Schools, in Michigan
- Horry County Schools, in South Carolina

== Biology and medicine ==
- Hajdu–Cheney syndrome
- High-content screening
- Human chorionic somatomammotropin
- Hydrocortisone

== Science and mathematics ==
- HCS clustering algorithm
- Heliospheric current sheet
- Hierarchical constraint satisfaction
- Hummocky cross-stratification

== Technology ==
- Hard-clad silica optical fiber
- Header check sequence
- Hierarchical cell structure (telecommunications)
- Hub-center steering

== Other uses ==
- Halifax Choral Society
- Halo Championship Series
- Harlem Children Society
- Henry Christian Spencer
- High Council of State (disambiguation)
- The Histochemical Society
- Hollywood Center Studios
- Honoris Crux Silver, a military decoration of South Africa
- Honourable Company's Service or Honourable Company's Ship, used to prefix the names of East India Company ships
- HUMINT Control System, an aspect of the Sensitive compartmented information protocol
- Hyderabad Civil Service, India
- Healthcare scientist
- Hull classification symbol
