= Religious hierarchy =

Religious hierarchy may refer to:

- Hierarchical organization, hierarchical structure as applied to all organizations, including some religions
- Religious stratification, the stratification of society based on religious beliefs or other faith-based considerations

== See also ==
- Hierarchy
