= Internet checksum =

Mechanism to detect corruption in the header of an IPv4 packet

The Internet checksum, also called the IPv4 header checksum is a checksum used in version 4 of the Internet Protocol (IPv4) to detect corruption in the header of IPv4 packets. It is carried in the IPv4 packet header, and represents the 16-bit result of the summation of the header words.

The IPv6 protocol does not use header checksums. Its designers considered that the whole-packet link layer checksumming provided in protocols, such as PPP and Ethernet, combined with the use of checksums in upper-layer protocols such as TCP and UDP, is sufficient. Thus, IPv6 routers are relieved of the task of recomputing the checksum whenever the packet changes, for instance by the lowering of the hop limit counter on every hop.

The Internet checksum is mandatory to detect errors in IPv6 UDP packets (including data payload).

The Internet checksum is used to detect errors in ICMP packets (including data payload).

== Computation ==
The checksum calculation is defined as follows:

The checksum field is the 16 bit one's complement of the one's complement sum of all 16 bit words in the header. For purposes of computing the checksum, the value of the checksum field is zero.

If there is no corruption, the result of summing the entire IP header, including checksum, and then taking its one's complement should be zero. At each hop, the checksum is verified. Packets with a checksum mismatch are discarded. The router must adjust the checksum if it changes the IP header (such as when decrementing the TTL).

The procedure is explained in detail in RFC 1071 "Computing the Internet Checksum". Optimizations are presented in RFC 1624 "Computation of the Internet Checksum via Incremental Update", to cover the case in routers that need to recompute the header checksum during packet forwarding when only a single field has changed.

== Algorithm ==
The internet checksum algorithm by the RFC is:

int checksum(int count, void* addr){

    /* Compute Internet Checksum for "count" bytes
    *         beginning at location "addr".
    */
    
    long sum = 0;
    
    while( count > 1 ){
        sum += * (unsigned short) addr++;
        count -= 2;
    }
    
    /* Add the left-over byte, if any */
    if( count > 0 ){
        sum += * (unsigned char *) addr;
    }
    
    /* Fold 32-bit sum to 16 bits */
    while( sum >> 16 ){
        sum = (sum & 0xffff) + (sum >> 16);
    }
    
    long checksum = ~sum;
}

== Examples ==
=== Calculating the IPv4 header checksum ===
Take the following truncated excerpt of an IPv4 packet. The header is shown in bold and the checksum is underlined.

4500 0073 0000 4000 4011 b861 c0a8 0001
c0a8 00c7 0035 e97c 005f 279f 1e4b 8180

For ones' complement addition, each time a carry occurs, we must add a 1 to the sum. A carry check and correction can be performed with each addition or as a post-process after all additions. If another carry is generated by the correction, another 1 is added to the sum.

To calculate the checksum, we can first calculate the sum of each 16-bit value within the header, skipping only the checksum field itself. Note that these values are in hexadecimal notation.

Initial addition: 4500 + 0073 + 0000 + 4000 + 4011 + 0000 (Note: 0000 is the initial checksum value before the calculation and is also included in the calculation steps.) + c0a8 + 0001 + c0a8 + 00c7 = 2479c

Carry addition is then made by adding the fifth hexadecimal digit to the first 4 digits: 2 + 479c = 479e

The checksum is then the ones' complement (bitwise NOT) of this result: NOT 479e = b861

This checksum value is shown as underlined in the original IP packet header above.

=== Verifying the IPv4 header checksum ===
When verifying a checksum, the same procedure is used as above, except that the original header checksum is not omitted.
4500 + 0073 + 0000 + 4000 + 4011 + b861 + c0a8 + 0001 + c0a8 + 00c7 = 2fffd
Add the carry bits:
fffd + 2 = ffff
Taking the ones' complement (flipping every bit) yields 0000, which indicates that no error is detected. IP header checksum does not check for the correct order of 16-bit values within the header.

== See also ==
- Frame check sequence
- Header check sequence
