= Religious segregation =

Separation of people according to their religion

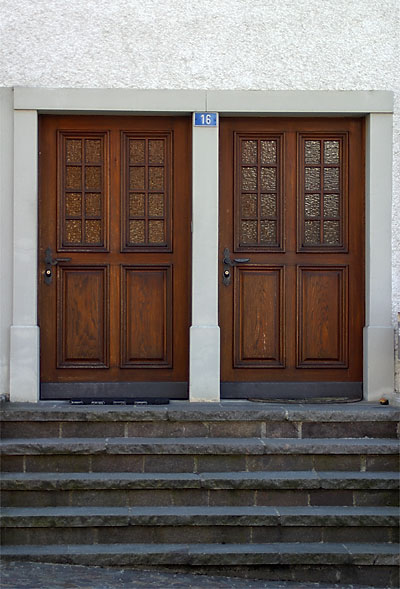
Two separate doors (one for Jews, and one for Christians) on a house in the town of Endingen, Switzerland

Religious segregation is the separation of people according to their religion. The term has been applied to cases of religious-based segregation which occurs as a social phenomenon, as well as segregation which arises from laws, whether they are explicit or implicit.

The similar term, religious apartheid has also been used for situations where people are segregated based on their religion, including sociological phenomena.

== Bosnia and Herzegovina ==
Religious segregation has been practiced in Bosnia and Herzegovina since the 12th century. Being historically a multi-ethnic and multi-religious nation, ethnicity and religion are interchangeable within the nation: Croatians are largely Catholic, Bosniaks are largely Muslim, and Serbs are largely Orthodox. These ethnoreligious linkages have influenced political and cultural dynamics, especially during periods of political dominance under foreign dominance where in one group would hold power over the others. Bosniak Muslims held more political influence and power under the Ottoman Empire than any other group, the Catholic Croats held power under the Austro-Hungarian Empire, and the Serbs held major political influence during the Kingdom of Yugoslavia.

Schooling in Bosnia and Herzegovina has been segregated by religion with educational services being provided by religious groups and organizations, this practice finds its roots as far back as the Vidovdan Constitution of 1921. Religious segregation in schooling continued during Communist Yugoslavia with government intervention proving ineffective. Since 1995 with the implementation of the Dayton Agreement, the Bosnian government has agreed and maintained upon a “two schools under one roof policy”, allowing religious schooling to continue as a form of cultural protection. In 2014, Herzegovina-Neretva became the first canton to ban religious schooling.

== India ==
The debate over the ban on non-Hindus entering Hindu temples began around 30 years ago when singer Yesudas, who planned to take part in a music program, was stopped at the Guruvayur Temple gate. He finally had to sing bhajans outside the temple wall. Though several temples in Kerala have signs saying non-Hindus are barred entry, few of them enforce it as strictly as Guruvayur Temple, which insists on following its distinct traditions. 'Only Orthodox Hindus are allowed’, reads a signboard hanging from the Lion's Gate of the Sri Jagannath Temple in Puri. The issue has triggered many a controversy in the past and continues to arouse strong feelings even today.

In the past a number of dignitaries, including former prime minister Indira Gandhi, had not been allowed to enter the 12th century shrine; she was married to a Parsi, Feroze Gandhi. In 2005, Princess Mahachakri Sirindhorn of Thailand was not allowed inside the temple as she is a Buddhist.

In 2006, the shrine did not allow a citizen of Switzerland named Elizabeth Jigler, who had donated 17.8 million Indian rupees to the temple, because she is a Christian. Kashi Vishvanath Varanasi in Varanasi, the temple stands on the western bank of the holy river Ganga, and is one of the 12 Jyotirlingas, the holiest of Shiva temples. The most famous of the many temples in Varanasi is the one dedicated to Vishveswara—Shiva as Lord of the Universe. Non-Hindus are not allowed inside the temple, although this is not always enforced. On the northern side of Vishwanath Temple is the Gyan Kupor Well. Non-Hindus are also strictly forbidden entry here.

== Partition of British India ==
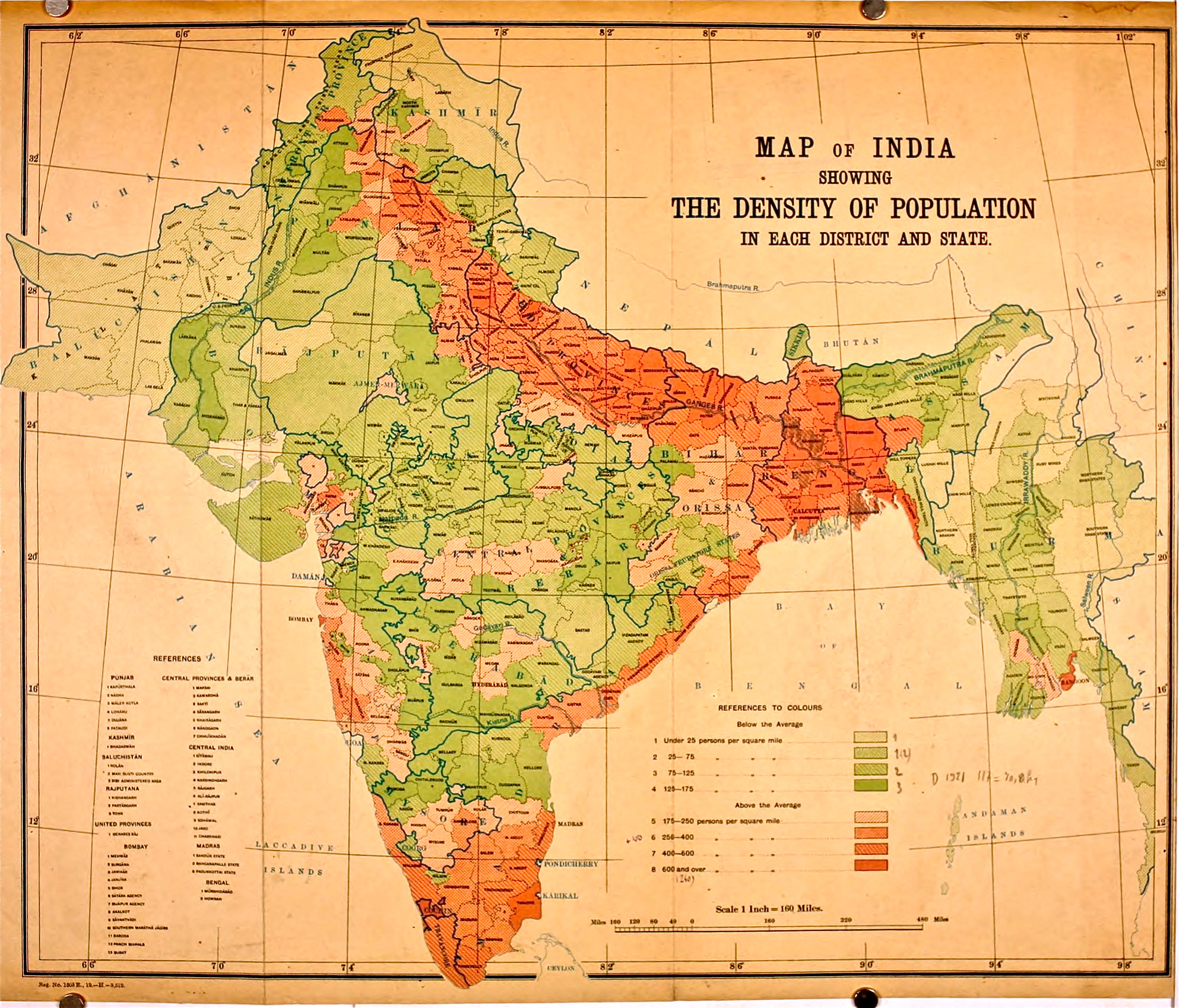
Map of colonial India, which was partitioned to create Pakistan as a homeland for Indian Muslims

The partition of India entailed creating two countries - India and Pakistan - on the basis of religion, as demanded by Muhammad Ali Jinnah and the All India Muslim League, though not without significant opposition.

In the colonial Indian province of Sind, the historian Ayesha Jalal describes the actions that the All India Muslim League used in order to undermine the government of Allah Bakhsh Soomro, which stood for a united India:

Even before the 'Pakistan' demand was articulated, the dispute over the Sukkur Manzilgah had been fabricated by provincial Leaguers to unsettle Allah Bakhsh Soomro's ministry which was dependent on support from the Congress and Independent Party. Intended as a way station for Mughal troops on the move, the Manzilgah included a small mosque which had been subsequently abandoned. On a small island in the near distance was the temple of Saad Bela, sacred space for the large number of Hindus settled on the banks of the Indus at Sukkur. The symbolic convergence of the identity and sovereignty over a forgotten mosque provided ammunition for those seeking office at the provincial level. Making an issue out of a non-issue, the Sind Muslim League in early June 1939 formally reclaimed the mosque. Once its deadline of 1 October 1939 for the restoration of the mosque to Muslims had passed, the League started an agitation.

In the few years before the partition, the Muslim League "monetarily subsidized" mobs that engaged in communal violence against Hindus and Sikhs in the areas of Multan, Rawalpindi, Campbellpur, Jhelum and Sargodha, as well as in the Hazara District. The Muslim League paid assassins money for every Hindu and Sikh they murdered. As such, leaders of the pro-separatist Muslim League, including Muhammad Ali Jinnah, issued no condemnation of the violence against Hindus and Sikhs in the Punjab.

Amid a terrible slaughter in which all main communities were both aggressors and victims, somewhere between half a million and a million people were killed. Tens of thousands of women were abducted, usually by men of a different religion. In Punjab in particular, where Hindus, Muslims and Sikhs had lived together for generations and spoke the same language, a stark segregation was brought about as Muslims headed west to Pakistan and Hindus and Sikhs fled east to India. —British Broadcasting Corporation

== Iran ==
Shi'a Islam has been the state religion of Iran since the Iranian Revolution in 1979. While Judaism, Christianity, and Zoroastrianism are officially recognized and legally protected religious minorities, they are not allowed to evangelize or allow Muslim Iranians to convert to other faiths.

Other religious minorities, such as those of the Baháʼí Faith, are not recognized by the government and thus do not have any legal protections nor the constitutional right to practice their religion. The Muslim Network for Baháʼí Rights has reported cases of Baháʼí students being expelled from university due to their religion. According to the Times Higher Education, Baháʼí educators are required to renounce their faith in order to teach in Iranian universities. Due to its heterodox beliefs, the Baháʼí faith is officially considered a heretical movement because of the Baháʼí belief that Bahá'u'lláh is a divinely ordained prophet in contradiction of the Qur'an, which asserts that Muhammad is the last and final messenger sent to mankind.

== Malaysia ==
In 2015, Malaysian human rights activist Shafiqah Othman Hamzah noted that the practice of apartheid policies against different religions in Malaysia is institutionalised and widespread, adding that "What we are living in Malaysia is almost no different from apartheid."

== Myanmar ==
The 2012 Rakhine State riots are a series of ongoing conflicts between Rohingya Muslims and ethnic Rakhine in northern Rakhine State, Myanmar. The riots broke out after weeks of sectarian disputes and they have been condemned by most people on both sides of the conflict. The immediate cause of the riots is unclear, with many commentators citing the killing of ten Burmese Muslims by ethnic Rakhine after the gang rape and murder of a Rakhine woman as the main cause.

Whole villages have been "decimated". Over three hundred houses and a number of public buildings have been razed. According to Tun Khin, the President of the Burmese Rohingya Organisation UK (BROUK), as of 28 June 650 Rohingyas have been killed, 1,200 are missing, and more than 80,000 have been displaced. According to the Myanmar authorities, the violence, between ethnic Rakhine Buddhists and Rohingya Muslims, left 78 people dead, 87 injured, and thousands of homes destroyed. It also displaced more than 52,000 people.

The government has responded by imposing curfews and by deploying troops in the region. On 10 June 2012, a state of emergency was declared in Rakhine, allowing the military to participate in the administration of the region. The Burmese army and police have been accused of targeting Rohingya Muslims through mass arrests and arbitrary violence. A number of monks' organisations that played a vital role in Burma's struggle for democracy have taken measures to block any humanitarian assistance to the Rohingya community. In July 2012, the Myanmar Government did not include the Rohingya minority group–-classified as stateless Bengali Muslims from Bangladesh. Myanmar immigration law was amended in 1982 declared 135 indigenous ethnic races of Myanmar without the Rohingya and therefore they are not granted the indigenous rights and only small part of the people can claim Myanmar citizenship per the law.

According to Amnesty International, the Muslim Rohingya people have continued to suffer from human rights violations under the Burmese junta since 1978, and many have fled to neighbouring Bangladesh as a result.

As of 2005, the UNHCR (United Nations High Commissioner for Refugees) had been assisting with the repatriation of Rohingya from Bangladesh, but allegations of human rights abuses in the refugee camps have threatened this effort.

Despite earlier efforts by the UN, the vast majority of Rohingya refugees have remained in Bangladesh, unable to return because of the regime in Myanmar. Now they face problems in Bangladesh where they do not receive support from the government. In February 2009, many Rohingya refugees were helped by Acehnese sailors in the Strait of Malacca, after 21 days at sea.

Over the years thousands of Rohingya also have fled to Thailand. There are roughly 111,000 refugees housed in nine camps along the Thai-Myanmar border. There have been charges that groups of them have been shipped and towed out to open sea from Thailand, and left there. In February 2009, there was evidence of the Thai army towing a boatload of 190 Rohingya refugees out to sea. A group of refugees rescued by Indonesian authorities also in February 2009 told harrowing stories of being captured and beaten by the Thai military, and then abandoned at open sea. By the end of February, there were reports that of a group of five boats were towed out to open sea, of which four boats sank in a storm, and one washed up on the shore. On 12 February 2009, Thailand's prime minister Abhisit Vejjajiva said there were "some instances" in which Rohingya people were pushed out to sea.

"There are attempts, I think, to let these people drift to other shores. [...] when these practices do occur, it is done on the understanding that there is enough food and water supplied. [...] It's not clear whose work it is [...] but if I have the evidence who exactly did this I will bring them to account."

== Nepal ==
On the banks of the Bagmati River in Kathmandu, Nepal is a Pashupatinath Temple dedicated to Pashupatinath. This temple complex which is on the UNESCO World Heritage Sites's list since 1979 was erected anew in the 15th century by King kirat Yalamber.

Entry into the inner courtyard is strictly monitored by the temple security, which is selective of who is allowed inside. Only practicing Hindus and Buddhists of Indian and Tibetan descendant are allowed into temple courtyard. Practicing Hindus and Buddhists of other than Nepali, Indian, Tibetan descent are not allowed into the temple complex along with other non Hindu visitors. Others can look at the main temple from adjacent side of the river.

== Northern Ireland ==
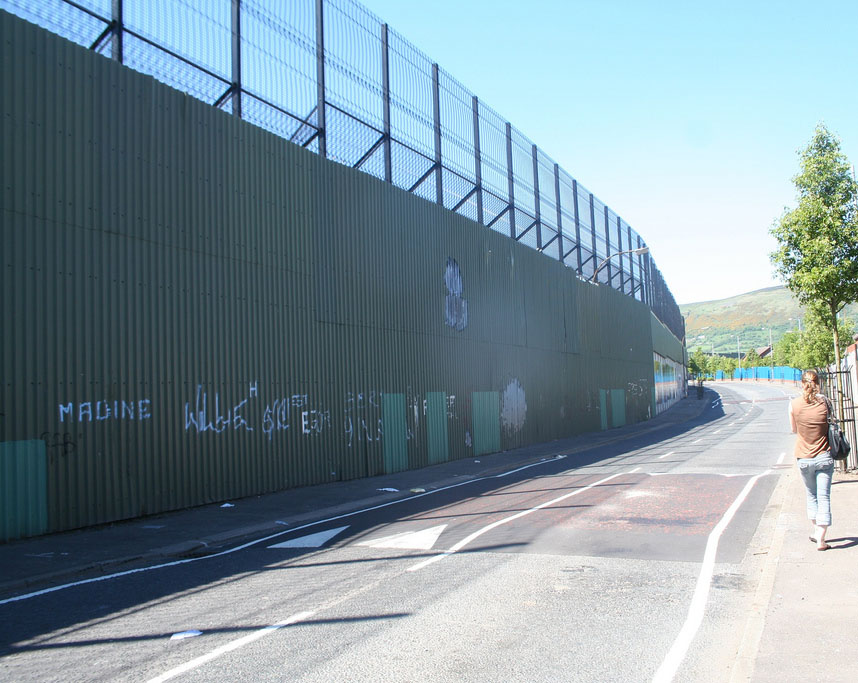
A "peace line" in Belfast, Northern Ireland, 2010

In Northern Ireland religious segregation has been a phenomenon which increased in many areas, particularly in the capital city of Belfast and Derry. This trend increased since the Troubles, a protracted series of conflicts and tensions between Roman Catholics and Protestants from the late 1960s to the late 2000s. Segregation does not occur everywhere. State schools are non-denominational, but many Roman Catholics send their children to Roman Catholic Maintained Schools.

In government housing, most people will choose to be housed within their own communities. This form of segregation is most common among lower income people who live in larger towns and cities, and areas where there have been heightened levels of violence.

In 2012 Foreign Policy reported:

The number of "peacewalls," physical barriers separating Catholic and Protestant communities, has increased sharply since the first ceasefires in 1994. Most people in the region cannot envisage the barriers being removed, according to a recent survey conducted by the University of Ulster. In housing and education, Northern Ireland remains one of the most segregated tracts of land anywhere on the planet—less than one in 10 children attends a school that is integrated between Catholics and Protestant. This figure has remained stubbornly low despite the cessation of violence.

== Pakistan ==
Today, Pakistan is officially an Islamic country and defines who is and who is not a Muslim. Under these conditions, Ahmadi Muslims are declared non-Muslim by law of the land and cannot claim to be Muslim. They are not permitted to call their mosques as mosques, or meet with people with the Islamic greeting of Peace. Ahmadi Muslims are excluded from government and any other high-profile positions within Pakistan unless they sign a covenant stating themselves to be non-Muslim. There have been cases when the Ahmadi Muslims have been expelled from schools, colleges and universities, for being Ahmadi Muslim. Once the entire population of Rabwah, the Pakistani headquarters of Ahmadi Muslims was charged under Anti-Ahmadiyya laws.

Pakistan also houses some holy sites for Sikhism. Due to security concerns, Muslims are not allowed in the Samadhi of Ranjit Singh at Lahore fort.

== Saudi Arabia ==
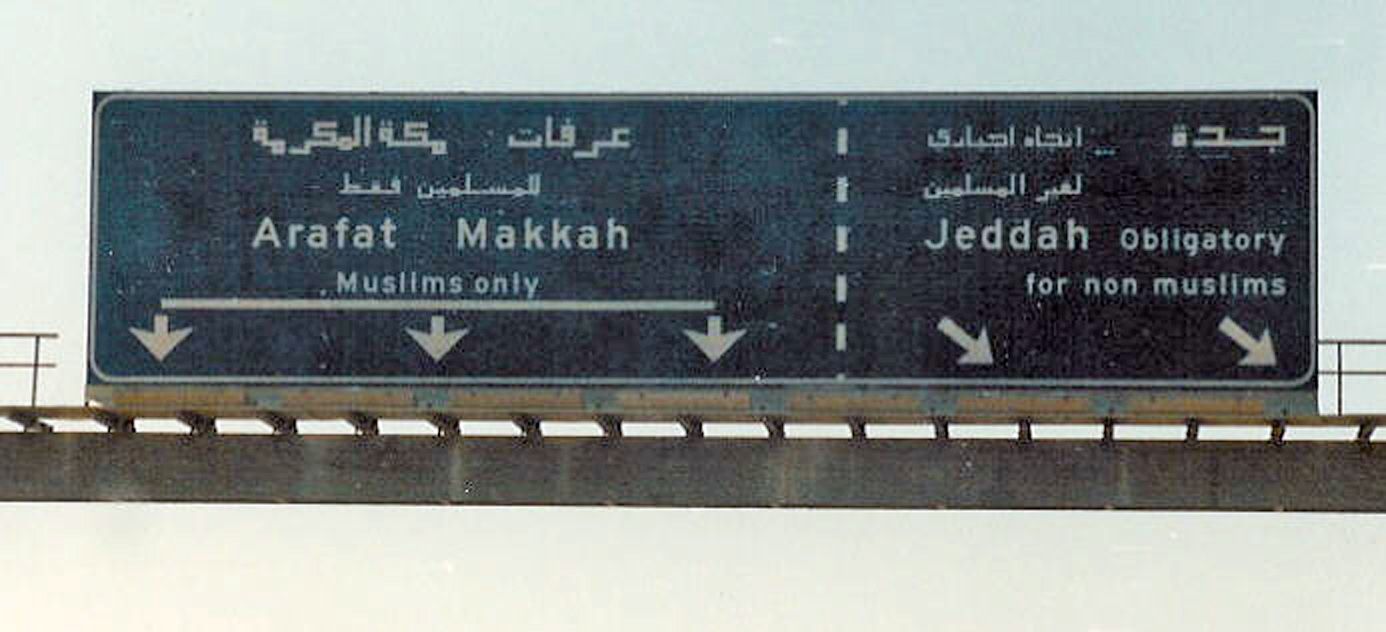
Road sign on a highway into Mecca, stating that one direction is "Muslims only" while another direction is "obligatory for non-Muslims". Religious police are stationed beyond the turnoff on the main road to prevent non-Muslims from entering Mecca. Non-Muslims may enter Medina, but must keep distance from the Al-Masjid al-Nabawi.

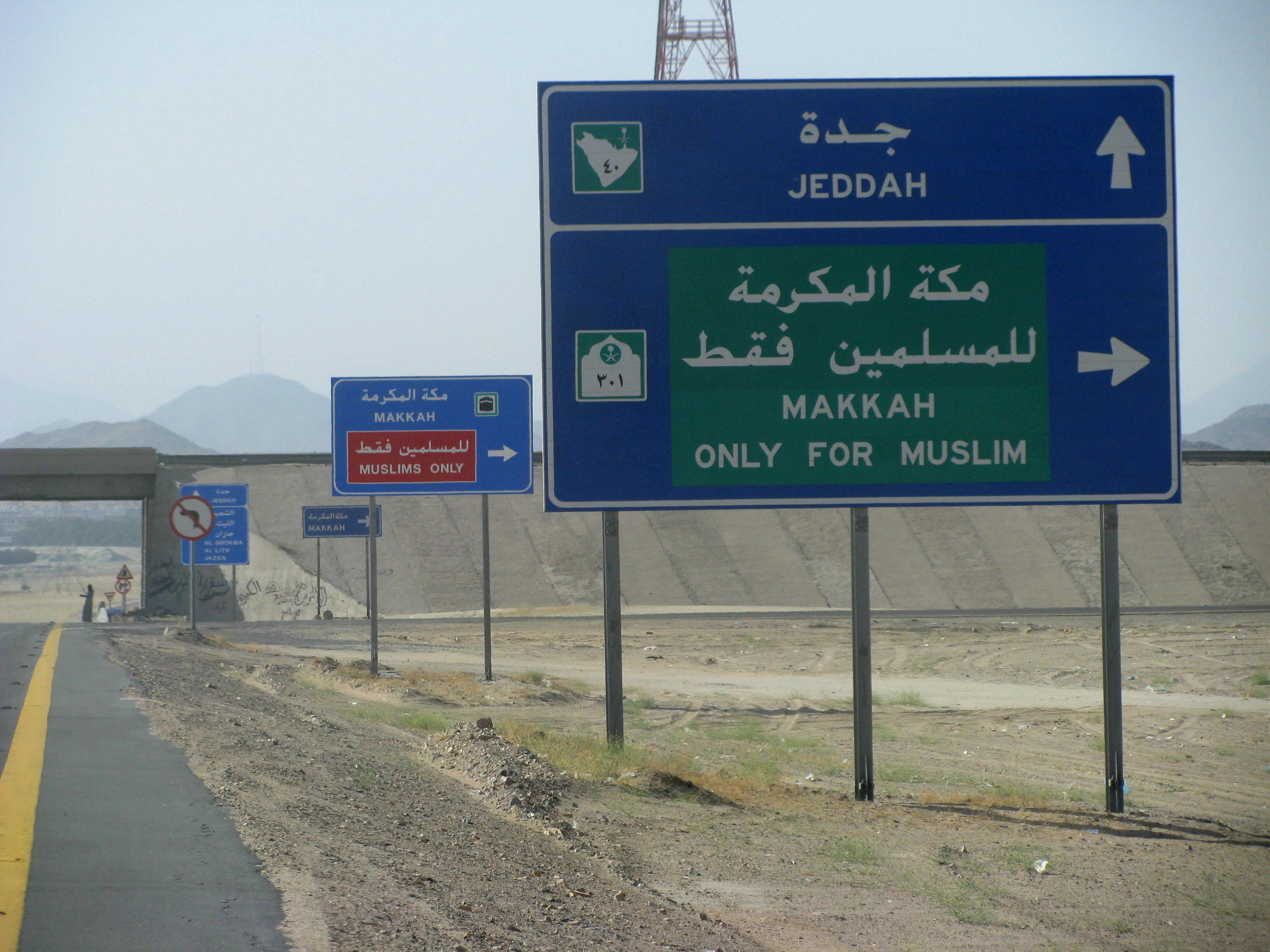
Road signs to Mecca, displaying segregated traffic.

Prior to 1 March 2004, the official Saudi government website stated that Jews were forbidden from entering the country; however, this practice was not enforced.

In Mecca, only Muslims are allowed, while non-Muslims may not enter or pass through. Attempting to enter Mecca as a non-Muslim can result in penalties such as a fine; being in Mecca as a non-Muslim can result in deportation.

In Medina, non-Muslims are not allowed to enter Nabawi Square, where the Al-Masjid Al-Nabawi is located.

== See also ==
- Apartheid
- Badge of shame
- Caste
- Devshirme
- Dhimmi laws
- Ghetto
- Jim Crow laws
- Jewish hat
- Mellah
- Millet
- Minority religion
- Nuremberg laws
- Pillarization
- Racial segregation
- Racial segregation in U.S. churches
- Religious stratification
- Second-class citizen
- Yellow badge
