= Jake Cave =

American baseball player (born 1992)

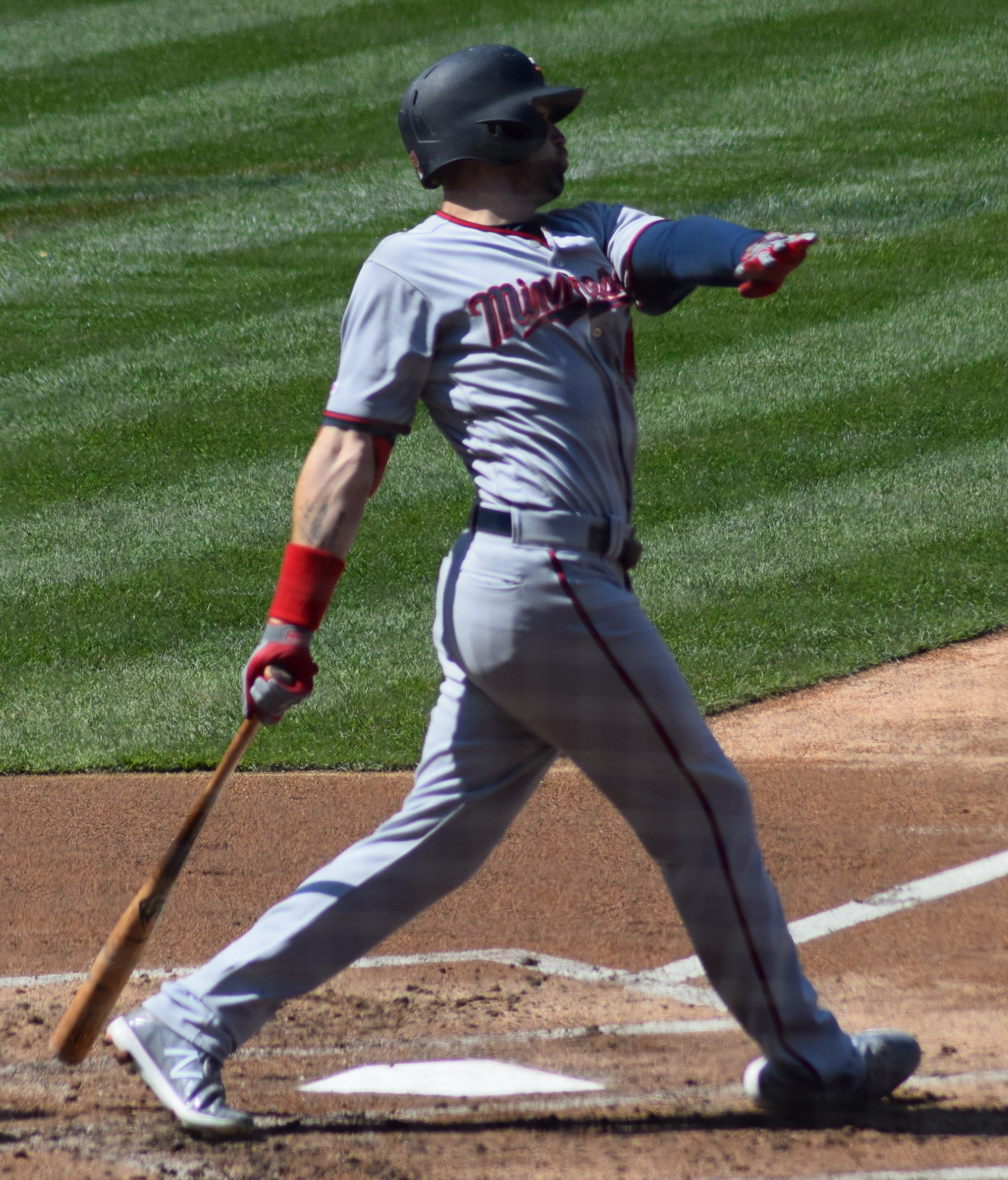
- Cave with the Minnesota Twins in 2019

Free agent
- Outfielder
- Born: December 4, 1992 (age 33); Hampton, Virginia, U.S.
- Bats: Left Throws: Left

Professional debut
- MLB: May 19, 2018, for the Minnesota Twins
- KBO: March 22, 2025, for the Doosan Bears

MLB statistics (through 2024 season)
- Batting average: .236
- Home runs: 45
- Runs batted in: 176

KBO statistics (through 2025 season)
- Batting average: .299
- Home runs: 16
- Runs batted in: 87
- Stats at Baseball Reference

Teams
- Minnesota Twins (2018–2022); Philadelphia Phillies (2023); Colorado Rockies (2024); Doosan Bears (2025)

Andrew Jacob Cave (born December 4, 1992) is an American professional baseball outfielder who is a free agent. He has previously played in Major League Baseball (MLB) for the Minnesota Twins, Philadelphia Phillies, and Colorado Rockies, and in the KBO League for the Doosan Bears. He was drafted by the New York Yankees in the 6th round of the 2011 MLB draft. He made his MLB debut in 2018.

== Amateur career ==
Cave attended Hampton Christian High School in Hampton, Virginia. As a pitcher for the school's baseball team in his sophomore year, Cave had a 10–0 win–loss record and a 1.23 earned run average with 109 strikeouts in 61 innings pitched. He also demonstrated his hitting ability winning the World Wooden Bat Association Under-16 national title. He committed to attend Louisiana State University on a college baseball scholarship. Before his junior year, he transferred to Kecoughtan High School. He also played basketball in high school. In 2011, his senior year at Kecoughtan, he had a .609 batting average. Cave was named the Peninsula District and Daily Press Player of the Year. He spent the summer after graduating from Kecoughtan playing for the Peninsula Pilots of the Coastal Plain League.

== Professional career ==
=== New York Yankees ===
The New York Yankees selected Cave in the sixth round, with the 209th overall selection, of the 2011 MLB draft. He signed with the Yankees, receiving a $825,000 signing bonus. He made his professional debut that season for the Gulf Coast Yankees. In his first game, he fractured his kneecap in a collision at home plate. The injury caused him to miss the rest of the season as well as the entire 2012 season.

In 2013, Cave played 113 games for the Charleston RiverDogs of the Single–A South Atlantic League. He finished the year hitting .282/.347/.401 with two home runs and 31 RBI. Cave started the 2014 season with the Tampa Yankees of the High–A Florida State League. After hitting .304/.354/.395 with three home runs and 24 RBI in 90 games with Tampa, he was promoted to the Trenton Thunder of the Double–A Eastern League in July, where he finished the season batting .273 with four home runs and 18 RBI in 42 games.

Cave spent most of the 2015 season in Trenton, where he hit .269/.330/.345 in 125 games and was a Mid-Season All-Star. He was promoted to the Scranton/Wilkes-Barre RailRiders of the Triple–A International League for the last week of the season. He was selected by the Cincinnati Reds in the 2015 Rule 5 draft. Cave did not make the Reds' Opening Day roster, and he was returned to the Yankees on April 5, 2016. He started the season back in Trenton but was promoted to Scranton/Wilkes-Barre in May. In the month of July, he led the league in batting average, hits, runs scored, and total bases to win International League Player of the Month. He hit .268/.331/.427 with eight home runs and 56 RBI between both levels that year.

In 2017, he returned to both the Thunder and RailRiders, batting a combined .305 with 20 home runs and 56 RBIs. The Yankees added Cave to their 40-man roster after the season. He was designated for assignment on March 12, 2018, following the Yankees signing of Neil Walker.

=== Minnesota Twins ===
The Minnesota Twins acquired Cave on March 16, 2018, for minor league pitcher Luis Gil. He began the season with the Rochester Red Wings of the International League, and was called up to the majors on May 19. He started in center field for the Twins that day and got his first major league hit, a two-run home run. After three games with the big league club, Cave was optioned back to Triple-A but returned June 9. He was again sent down on June 14 before returning on June 26. On the season, Cave hit .265/.313/.473 with 13 home runs and 45 RBI in 91 games. He led all Major League Baseball hitters in average distance per home run, at 421 feet.

Cave made the Twins opening day roster as a fourth outfielder. On the season, Cave hit .258 with eight home runs and 25 RBI. He was added to the playoff roster for the 2019 postseason. In 2020, Cave hit .221 with four home runs and 15 RBI during the COVID-19 shortened season.

On May 15, 2021, Cave was placed on the 60-day injured list after suffering a fracture in his back. Cave was activated off of the injured list on July 24. On November 25, 2021, the Twins outrighted Cave to the St. Paul Saints. He was invited to spring training before the 2022 season. Cave had his contract selected on August 1, 2022.

=== Philadelphia Phillies ===
The Baltimore Orioles claimed Cave off of waivers on October 12, 2022. On November 4, the Orioles and Cave agreed to a split contract to avoid salary arbitration for the 2023 season.

The Philadelphia Phillies claimed Cave off waivers from the Orioles on December 2. Cave made the Phillies' Opening Day roster in 2023. He was optioned to Triple-A on May 2 when Bryce Harper returned from Tommy John surgery. After hitting .400/.500/.798 during a 21-game hit streak, Cave was named International League Player of the Week for the month of May. He was recalled to the majors on July 21 and remained on the roster through the rest of the season and postseason. In 65 games for Philadelphia, Cave batted .212/.272/.348 with five home runs and 21 RBI. After the season, he re-signed with the Phillies.

=== Colorado Rockies ===
On March 24, 2024, four days before the first regular season game, the Phillies traded Cave to the Colorado Rockies in exchange for cash considerations. He played in a career–high 123 games for Colorado, slashing .251/.290/.396 with seven home runs and 37 RBI. On October 18, Cave was removed from the 40–man roster and sent outright to the Triple–A Albuquerque Isotopes, but rejected the assignment and elected free agency.

=== Doosan Bears ===
On November 26, 2024, Cave signed a one-year, $1 million contract with the Doosan Bears of the KBO League. He made 136 appearances for Doosan in 2025, slashing .299/.351/.463 with 16 home runs, 87 RBI, and 17 stolen bases. Cave became a free agent following the season.

On February 20, 2026, Cave signed with the Tecolotes de los Dos Laredos of the Mexican Baseball League. However, he failed to make the Opening Day roster and was released by the team prior to the start of the season on April 14.

=== El Águila de Veracruz ===
On April 29, 2026, Cave signed with El Águila de Veracruz of the Mexican League. In 47 appearances for Veracruz, Cave batted .309/.340/.474 with four home runs and 24 RBI.

=== Tampa Bay Rays ===
On June 23, 2026, Cave signed a minor league contract with the Tampa Bay Rays. He made 36 appearances for the Triple–A Durham Bulls, slashing .245/.339/.373 with three home runs, 15 RBI, and eight stolen bases.

=== Chicago White Sox ===
On August 31, 2026, Cave was traded to the Chicago White Sox in exchange for cash considerations. In 13 games with Triple-A Charlotte Knights he batted .191/.255/.468 with 3 home runs and 7 RBIs. He elected free agency on November 2.

== Personal life ==
Cave's father, Bryan, played baseball at Kecoughtan and became the head coach of The Apprentice School. Both of Cave's sisters played softball and were named All-District.
