= Highland Catholic School =

Location
- 2017 Bohland Avenue; Saint Paul, Minnesota 55116; United States
- Coordinates: 44°54′59″N 93°11′7″W

Information
- Type: Private, Coeducational
- Religious affiliation: Roman Catholic
- Established: 1971
- Oversight: Archdiocese of Saint Paul and Minneapolis
- Principal: Jane Schmidt
- Grades: Preschool-8
- Campus type: Urban
- Colors: Blue, Green, and Red
- Team name: Hornets
- Website: highlandcatholic.org

Highland Catholic School, is a private, co-educational Catholic grade school in Saint Paul, Minnesota, United States. It services grades Preschool through Eighth Grade. Highland Catholic School is the official school of Lumen Christi Catholic Community (LCCC). The church is connected to the school and students monthly go to mass during the school year.

== History ==
HCS used to be named St. Leo, the official school of the church that is now the site of LCCC. In 1971, the parishes of St. Leo and St. Therese merged and though keeping their own churches, the St. Therese school moved into the St. Leo school and was renamed Highland Catholic School. In 1979, the St. Gregory parish merged with the St. Leo/St. Therese parish and St. Gregory's school also merged with HCS. With the addition of the St. Gregory school, HCS had become the largest and oldest school in the archdiocese of Minneapolis and St. Paul.

In 1991, an effort was made to revitalize the school. Gains were made in curriculum design, teacher benefits, professional development, security, and facility upgrade. A Spanish program was added for K-8 and a Performing Arts program was also added for Middle School students.

In 2006, the churches of St. Leo, St. Gregory, and St. Therese decided to all move into the St. Leo church, renaming it Lumen Christi. Construction to improve the new Lumen Christi included connecting the school and the church.

== Swing ==
Swing is the school's annual fund raiser in the form of an auction. Formed in 1999, parents attend to bid in the silent auction, the live auction, and, recently added, the online auction. The title of each year's swing contains regular phrases that have the word swing in them and that year's name is usually the topic of that year's Swing. For example, "Swing for the Fences" would mean that Swing that year would be baseball themed. In 2010, Swing raised over $100,000.

=== Swing Daddys ===
In 2004, a group of fathers created a band to play at Swing that they named "The Swing Daddys." Later, a few mothers and a former female teacher joined, but the name remained the same. The Swing Daddys have also played at Highland Fest.
