= Hallett Cove School =

Coordinates: 35°4′38.48″S 138°30′37.59″E

- Adelaide, South Australia; Australia

Information
- Type: Public
- Motto: Honour Commitment Success
- Established: February 1987
- Principal: Tony Hall
- Enrolment: 1230 (Term 3 2021)
- Campus: Urban
- Colours: Navy, light blue and white
- Website: http://www.hcs.sa.edu.au/

Hallett Cove School (HCS) is a Reception to Year 12 public school located in the southern coastal suburb of Hallett Cove in Adelaide, South Australia. It was founded in 1987 to cater for years Reception to 10, expanding to cater for years 11 and 12 in 1996. The current principal is Tony Hall, succeeding retired principal Mary Asikas.

The school is separated into three levels: the Junior School (R–6), Middle School (7–9) and Senior School (10–12). The school offers co-curricular activities for students to learn leadership and teamwork skills, namely school representative council, year level management groups, zone sport and music. The senior school (Year 10) takes part in an annual skiing trip and the Rock Eisteddfod, in which the school won in 2000.

== Brief history ==
Late in 1984 the Southern Area Education Office commenced a program of consultation with the Hallett Cove community with the objective of establishing an R–10 school. In March 1985 a Parents' Reference Group was formed and in September of that year established itself as an Interim School Council.

Hallett Cove School opened in February 1987 as the only R–10 school in metropolitan Adelaide. Susan Monks was the school’s first Principal and there were 300 students from Reception to Year 7 on the first day of school. The school grew rapidly and classroom accommodation shortages and zoning issues were topics of conversation throughout 1988–89.

Peter Jackson was the second Principal of the school and commenced duties mid-way through the 1990 school year. For the first time in its short history the school had all of its solid buildings available and all of its levels, R–10, in place.

An opening ceremony for the school occurred on 17 May 1991 with the Hon. Greg Crafter, Minister of Education attending. During 1991 a reference group recommended to the Minister of Education that Hallett Cove School provide Years 11 and 12 education. The decision to add senior secondary education to the school was made in 1992.

The school had its third principal, Jim Davies, appointed in 1993. Year 11 studies commenced in 1995 and Year 12 in 1996, making Hallett Cove School metropolitan Adelaide’s third R–12 school. A major building project occurred throughout 1995–97 to cater for the addition of the senior secondary curriculum.

The School celebrated their 25th anniversary in

== School logo ==
In 1988 the Principal Susan Monks, in conjunction with the School Council, initiated a search for a school logo. The brief was to have a simple symbol which reflected some aspect of Hallett Cove and the school. After a number of weeks and a large variety of ideas, the staff and parent bodies finally settled on our current design. It was designed by Art teacher, Dave Smith. The horizontal lines represent both the sea and the geological strata of the Hallett Cove Conservation Park and the sun as a symbolic reference to youthful aspirations as well as the visual beauty of our ocean view in the late afternoon.

== Notable alumni ==
Matthew Golding - Adelaide Crows, AFL. Adam Crabb - Adelaide Giants, baseball. Craig Fleer - AFL Umpire.
