= HOOD method =

HOOD (Hierarchic Object-Oriented Design) is a detailed software design method. It is based on hierarchical decomposition of a software problem. It comprises textual and graphical representations of the design.

HOOD was initially created for the European Space Agency (1987) and is used in such varied domains as aerospace (Eurofighter Typhoon, Helios 2 Earth Observation ground control, Ariane 5 on-board computer), ground transportation, and nuclear plants.

HOOD main target languages are Ada, Fortran and C.
