= High Council of State =

High Council of State can refer to

- High Council of State (Algeria)
- High Council of State (Libya)
- High Council of State (Mauritania)
- High Council of State (Netherlands)
