= Hierarchical epistemology =

Theory of knowledge

Hierarchical epistemology is a theory of knowledge which posits that beings have different access to reality depending on their ontological rank.
