= Hampton Christian Schools =

School in Virginia, United States

Coordinates: 37°3′14.3″N 76°22′41.6″W

Hampton Christian Academy (HCA) is a private pre-K to grade 12 Christian school located in Hampton, Virginia, United States. The school has an elementary school campus and a high school campus.

== Extracurricular activities ==
Hampton Christian offers a wide range of sports, including baseball, softball, cheerleading, volleyball, basketball, soccer, and track and field. Extracurricular activities include the Journalism Club, the Creative Writing & Literature Club, the Poetry Club and an honors society (Beta Club).

== Notable students and alumni ==
- Jake Cave - baseball player
- Phillip Jones (politician) - Mayor of Newport News (2023–present)
