= Harrisburg Christian School =

Private school in Pennsylvania, U.S.

Coordinates: 40.351°N 76.806°W

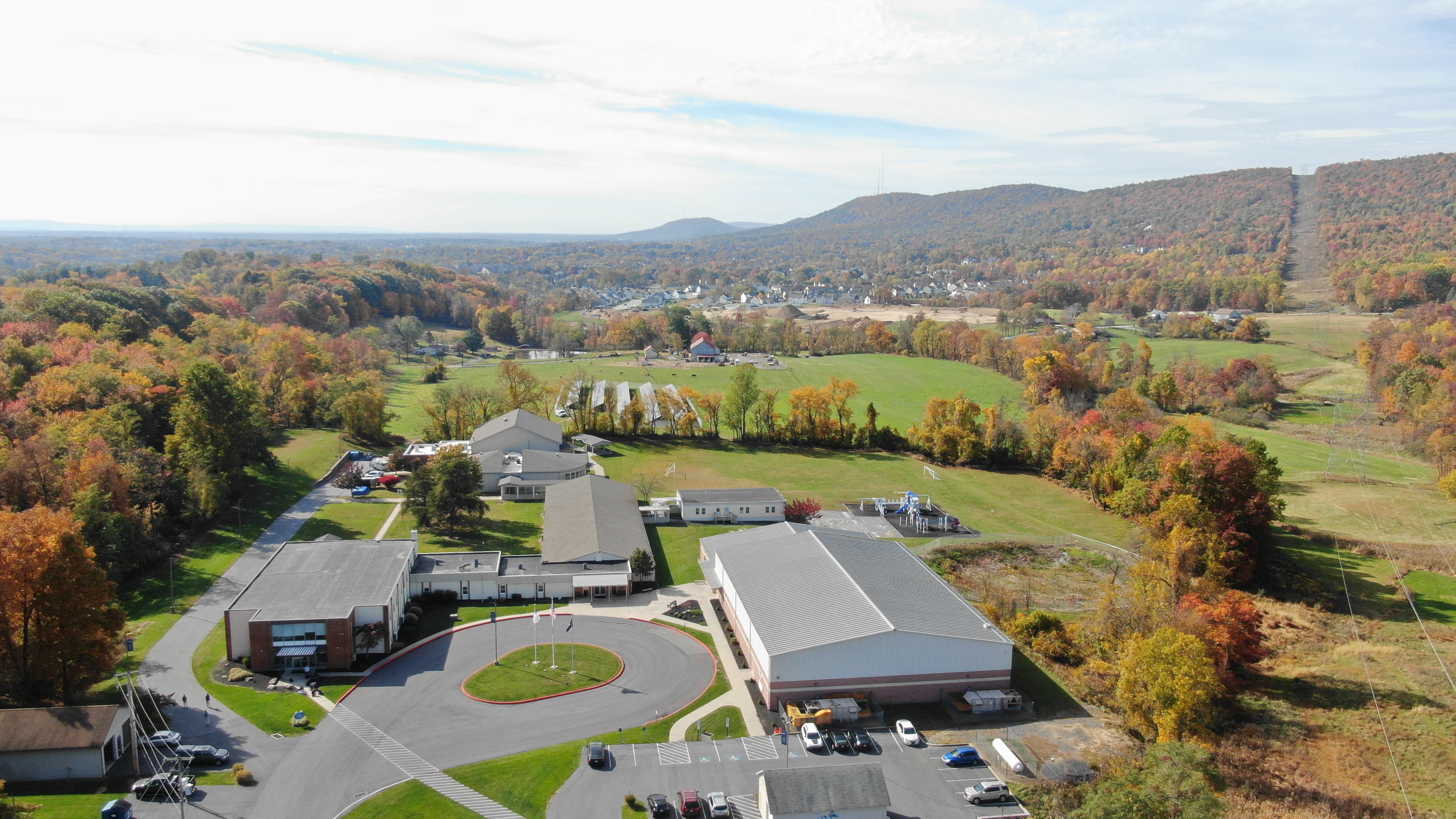

Location
- 2000 Blue Mountain Parkway; Harrisburg, Pennsylvania, 17112

Information
- Type: Christian highschool private elementary school middle school
- Established: September 13, 1955
- Staff: 60
- Enrollment: 353 (2025–2026)
- Membership: Association of Christian Schools International, Middle States Association Accreditation
- Website: https://hcs.csagh.org/

Harrisburg Christian School is a private, coeducational Christian elementary, middle school and high school, located on the north side of the greater Harrisburg, Pennsylvania area in the village of Linglestown, Pennsylvania. The school was founded in 1955 by parents who believed "responsibility for the educational instruction of their children according to Scripture was theirs, not the states". Harrisburg Christian School is not operated by a local church, but has independent status, being “owned” by The Christian School Association of Greater Harrisburg. Harrisburg Christian School and West Shore Christian Academy merged to form a new Christian school district overseen by the Christian School Association of Greater Harrisburg (CSAGH) on January 1, 2017.

The school was located in as many as five different rented locations around the greater Harrisburg area between 1955 and 1965 before building its own elementary school building on its current location at 2000 Blue Mountain Parkway in Harrisburg, Pennsylvania

Over the next fifty years the school has constructed additions to the original building, including the Arts and Athletics Center, the Knight Cafe, and improvements to the school grounds. Situated on Blue Mountain one mile from downtown Linglestown, Harrisburg Christian School resides on 38 acres of fields, woods, and wetlands. Approximately eleven acres of the campus have been developed as athletic fields.

Harrisburg Christian School offers an educational program that integrates the historic Christian Faith into a college-preparatory academic program of instruction. HCS employs 36 full and part-time teachers with a total employee base of 60. The student enrollment for the 2025-2026 school year is 353. HCS’s teacher-student ratio is 1:11.
