= Hierarchical constraint satisfaction =

In artificial intelligence and operations research, hierarchical constraint satisfaction (HCS) is a method of handling constraint satisfaction problems where the variables have large domains by exploiting their internal structure.

For many real-world problems the domain elements cluster together into sets with common properties and relations. This structure can be represented as a hierarchy and is partially ordered on the subset of a relation. The expectation is that the domains are structured so that the elements of a set frequently share consistency properties permitting them to be retained or eliminated as a unit. Thus, if some elements of a set satisfy a constraint, but not all, the subsets of the set are considered. In this way, if no elements of a set can satisfy the constraint the whole set can be discarded. Thus, structuring the domain helps in considering sets of elements all at a time and hence helps in pruning the search space more quickly.
