= Hierarchical cell structure (telecommunications) =

Splitting of cells in mobile telecommunication

For telephone services to mobile phones, hierarchical cell structure (HCS) used in mobile telecommunication means the splitting of cells. This type of cell structure allows the network to effectively use the geographical area and serve an increasing population.

== Mechanism ==
The large cell (called a "macro cell") is rearranged to include small cells in it called micro and pico cells. The cricket stadium/exhibition ground can be a micro cell and a multi storied building can be a pico cell within the large cell. The micro/pico cell is allocated the radio spectrum to serve the increased population. The User Equipments (UEs) going out of the pico/micro cells are allowed to reselect the larger cell.

The HCS cells are given priorities from 0-7 where 0 is the lowest priority and 7 the highest. The cells close to the serving cell are given highest priority. The mobiles in high mobility prioritise to reselect to the lower priority cells to avoid continuous reselections.

Microcells can add localized capacity within Macro cell.
