= Religious stratification =

Division of a society into hierarchical layers on the basis of religion

Religious stratification is the division of a society into hierarchical layers on the basis of religious beliefs, affiliation, or faith practices.

According to Kingsley Davis and Wilbert E. Moore, "[t]he reason why religion is necessary is apparently to be found in the fact that human society achieves its unity primarily through the possession by its members of certain ultimate values and ends in common". Furthermore, Davis and Moore contend that it is "the role of religious belief and ritual to supply and reinforce this appearance of reality" that these "certain ultimate values" have. This is one possible explanation for why religion is one of the underlying factors which links various forms of inequality into a chain of stratification.

== Critical overview ==
Broadly defined, social stratification is constituted by the division of a society into hierarchical layers of wealth, power, and prestige. These layers, or strata, have been related to a variety of social categories, such as:

- Race
- Class
- Gender
- Ethnicity
- Religion

Sociologists have paid attention to stratification based on race, class, gender, and ethnicity. Religion is closely tied to ethnic affiliation. Research suggests that religious stratification deserves more attention than it usually gets. It is a common development in religiously diverse societies. Once it becomes embedded in societies' laws, customs, and ideologies, it tends to persist. It also has societal consequences. Thus, it is important in its own right, but also in relation to other forms of stratification.

== In the United States ==
Sociologists James D. Davidson and Ralph E. Pyle (2011) argue that religious stratification emerged during America's colonial period, as a result of religious ethnocentrism, religious competition, and unequal resources. They show that Anglicans, Congregationalists, and Presbyterians were over-represented among the economic, political, and educational elites. Other Protestant groups, Catholics, Jews, and people with no religious preference ranked much lower in status.

The ranking of religious groups has changed in some ways over the course of U.S. history (Davidson and Pyle 2011, Pyle 1996). Most notably, Jews have risen into the upper stratum, while Catholics have climbed into the upper-middle stratum. However, religious stratification persists. For example, Anglicans (now Episcopalians), Congregationalists (now United Church of Christ), and Presbyterians remain in the upper stratum, and other Protestants groups such as Baptists (who ranked low in the colonial period) still have not experienced much upward mobility.

These developments are linked to inter-religious power struggles related to membership size, organizational capacity, and resources. The struggles affect societal laws, ideologies, and customs. In the colonial period, religious stratification was justified by law: Congregationalists were the "established" church in New England colonies; Anglicans were the "established" church in southern colonies. The First and Fourteenth Amendments, along with other civil rights laws, have knocked the legal foundation out from under religious stratification. The pro-Protestant ideology that emerged in the colonial period has been tempered somewhat by multiculturalism, but it remains an integral part of American culture. Religious groups that have adapted most to this ideology have experienced more mobility than other groups. Colonial elites also have developed a number of customs, such as church-sponsored preparatory schools, private colleges, universities, and legacy admissions that have perpetuated their prominence (Coe and Davidson 2011). Another custom has been the tendency to appoint other religious elites to political office (Davidson, Kraus, and Morrissey 2005). Jews and Catholics have developed customs of their own, such as parochial schools and business ownership, that have contributed to improvements in their social status.

Contrary to Davis and Moore's argument that stratification is functional for society, Davidson and Pyle (2011) argue that religious stratification destabilizes society. It produces social problems, like religious hate crimes, that would not otherwise exist.

== Stratification as the result of the social implications of religion ==
According to Evelyn L. Lehrer religion has a significant impact on marital stability, the choice of marital partner, fertility, women's work at home and in the labor market, education, wages and wealth, and the timing of entry into first union and the choice of whether to cohabit. In her research there are many instances in which stratification is the byproduct of religious faith practices. Stratification based on religion is evident specifically in the realm of economics.

One case in point is the presence of women in the work force. Lehrer explains "The Mormon and conservative Protestant faiths make a sharp distinction between male and female social and economic roles, encouraging the traditional division of labor within the household when young children are present" (713). Depending on the socioeconomic class of the family, the expectation of the woman to adhere to these traditional social roles could be a factor by which the economic advancement of the family is limited.

Cited within Lehrer's book are studies which examine levels of education, wages, and wealth among different religious faiths. Lehrer writes in her book, "A conservative Protestant upbringing may be associated with an authoritarian approach to knowledge and a rejection of critical inquiry and unconventional modes of thinking, implying lower levels of certain types of home investments in child quality" (716). This was derived from the work of Sherkat and Darnell published in 1999. Also based on the work of Sherkat and Darnell published in 1997, is Lehrer's assertion that conservative Protestant parents "often discourage their children from taking college preparatory courses, out of a concern that such courses may be harmful to them" (716). Lehrer, as a result, contends that children raised by conservative Protestant parents "often acquire less human capital in their formative years and may thus be less able to benefit from college" (716). So, as the topic is quite well developed, educational inequality is well researched and there is much evidence concerning the impact that an individual's level of education can have in terms of the hierarchy of stratification. It seems however that there can be seen another factor which should be allowed for in terms of determining the lines of stratification. Perhaps the significant impact that education plays in inequality can be even better understood when religion is controlled for.

Other works which have investigated religious stratification include that of Gaetano Mosca whose research was published in his The Ruling Class. Although this work was published in the late 1930s the concept that is brought forth is interesting to note and is perhaps still quite relevant in contemporary times. Mosca states that "In societies in which religious beliefs are strong and ministers of the faith form a special class a priestly aristocracy almost always arises and gains possession of a more or less important share of the wealth and the political power."

== See also ==
- Religious discrimination
- Religious persecution
- Religious segregation
- Wealth inequality in the United States
